= 2020 European Men's Handball Championship qualification =

This article describes the qualification for the 2020 European Men's Handball Championship and inaugural EHF Euro Cup.

== Qualification system ==
Teams competed for 20 places at the final tournament in two distinct Qualification Phases. In each phase, the teams were divided into several pots according to their positions in the EHF National Team Ranking.

== Qualification Phase 1 ==
=== Seeding ===
The draw for the qualification round was held on 24 June 2016 in Vienna, Austria. The group winners advance to the Phase 2.

Pot 1	Pot 2	Pot 3
Turkey; Greece; Italy	Estonia; Luxembourg; Cyprus	Georgia; Faroe Islands; Kosovo

=== Groups ===
==== Group 1 ====
The tournament was played in a tournament format.

Pos	Team	Pld	W	D	L	GF	GA	GD	Pts	Qualification
1	Greece	2	2	0	0	50	41	+9	4	Qualification Phase 2
2	Cyprus	2	1	0	1	37	43	−6	2	
3	Faroe Islands (H)	2	0	0	2	43	46	−3	0	

Source: Eurohandball
Rules for classification: 1) points; 2) head-to-head points; 3) head-to-head goal difference; 4) head-to-head number of goals scored; 5) goal difference.
(H) Hosts

13 January 2017; 20:00	Cyprus	20–19	Faroe Islands	Høllin á Hálsi, Tórshavn; Attendance: 450; Referees: Jaškins, Žabko (LAT)
13 January 2017; 20:00	J. Argyrou 8	(8–9)	Nielsen, Sigurbjørnsson 5	Høllin á Hálsi, Tórshavn; Attendance: 450; Referees: Jaškins, Žabko (LAT)
13 January 2017; 20:00	2× (yellow card) 7× (suspension)	Report	2× (yellow card) 2× (suspension)	Høllin á Hálsi, Tórshavn; Attendance: 450; Referees: Jaškins, Žabko (LAT)

14 January 2017; 18:00	Greece	24–17	Cyprus	Høllin á Hálsi, Tórshavn; Attendance: 100; Referees: Jaškins, Žabko (LAT)
14 January 2017; 18:00	Papadopoulos 6	(13–6)	J. Argyrou 4	Høllin á Hálsi, Tórshavn; Attendance: 100; Referees: Jaškins, Žabko (LAT)
14 January 2017; 18:00	3× (yellow card) 3× (suspension)	Report	2× (yellow card) 4× (suspension)	Høllin á Hálsi, Tórshavn; Attendance: 100; Referees: Jaškins, Žabko (LAT)

15 January 2017; 16:00	Faroe Islands	24–26	Greece	Høllin á Hálsi, Tórshavn; Attendance: 400; Referees: Jaškins, Žabko (LAT)
15 January 2017; 16:00	Olsen 5	(11–13)	Papadopoulos 6	Høllin á Hálsi, Tórshavn; Attendance: 400; Referees: Jaškins, Žabko (LAT)
15 January 2017; 16:00	2× (yellow card) 1× (suspension)	Report	2× (yellow card) 4× (suspension)	Høllin á Hálsi, Tórshavn; Attendance: 400; Referees: Jaškins, Žabko (LAT)

==== Group 2 ====
Pos	Team	Pld	W	D	L	GF	GA	GD	Pts	Qualification
1	Estonia	4	3	0	1	96	86	+10	6	Qualification Phase 2
2	Turkey	4	2	1	1	96	84	+12	5	
3	Kosovo	4	0	1	3	86	108	−22	1	

Source: Eurohandball
Rules for classification: 1) points; 2) head-to-head points; 3) head-to-head goal difference; 4) head-to-head number of goals scored; 5) goal difference.

2 November 2016; 19:00	Turkey	26–22	Kosovo	THF Sport Hall, Ankara; Attendance: 750; Referees: Cindrić, Gonzurek (CRO)
2 November 2016; 19:00	Çelik 6	(13–8)	Dedaj 5	THF Sport Hall, Ankara; Attendance: 750; Referees: Cindrić, Gonzurek (CRO)
2 November 2016; 19:00	3× (yellow card) 3× (suspension)	Report	3× (yellow card) 3× (suspension)	THF Sport Hall, Ankara; Attendance: 750; Referees: Cindrić, Gonzurek (CRO)

6 November 2016; 19:30	Kosovo	24–24	Turkey	Palace of Youth and Sports, Pristina; Attendance: 1,300; Referees: Frieser, Kavulič (CZE)
6 November 2016; 19:30	Quni 6	(11–12)	Çelik, Ersin 7	Palace of Youth and Sports, Pristina; Attendance: 1,300; Referees: Frieser, Kavulič (CZE)
6 November 2016; 19:30	3× (yellow card) 2× (suspension)	Report	2× (yellow card) 5× (suspension)	Palace of Youth and Sports, Pristina; Attendance: 1,300; Referees: Frieser, Kavulič (CZE)

4 January 2017; 19:30	Kosovo	17–31	Estonia	Palace of Youth and Sports, Pristina; Attendance: 1,500; Referees: Hofer, Schmidhuber (AUT)
4 January 2017; 19:30	Dedaj 5	(7–13)	Rooba 8	Palace of Youth and Sports, Pristina; Attendance: 1,500; Referees: Hofer, Schmidhuber (AUT)
4 January 2017; 19:30	1× (yellow card) 5× (suspension)	Report	2× (yellow card) 5× (suspension)	Palace of Youth and Sports, Pristina; Attendance: 1,500; Referees: Hofer, Schmidhuber (AUT)

8 January 2017; 19:30	Estonia	27–23	Kosovo	Põlva Mesikäpa Hall, Põlva; Attendance: 784; Referees: Geraets, Geraets (NED)
8 January 2017; 19:30	Rooba 7	(14–10)	Terziqi 6	Põlva Mesikäpa Hall, Põlva; Attendance: 784; Referees: Geraets, Geraets (NED)
8 January 2017; 19:30	3× (yellow card) 3× (suspension)	Report	3× (yellow card) 5× (suspension)	Põlva Mesikäpa Hall, Põlva; Attendance: 784; Referees: Geraets, Geraets (NED)

11 January 2017; 19:30	Estonia	18–28	Turkey	Põlva Mesikäpa Hall, Põlva; Attendance: 801; Referees: Thomassen, Schmack (BEL)
11 January 2017; 19:30	Lees 4	(9–11)	Örnek 6	Põlva Mesikäpa Hall, Põlva; Attendance: 801; Referees: Thomassen, Schmack (BEL)
11 January 2017; 19:30	3× (yellow card) 1× (suspension)	Report	3× (yellow card) 7× (suspension)	Põlva Mesikäpa Hall, Põlva; Attendance: 801; Referees: Thomassen, Schmack (BEL)

15 January 2017; 16:00	Turkey	18–20	Estonia	THF Sport Hall, Ankara; Attendance: 1,100; Referees: Stokes, Bartlett (GBR)
15 January 2017; 16:00	Pektaş 5	(10–8)	Voika 5	THF Sport Hall, Ankara; Attendance: 1,100; Referees: Stokes, Bartlett (GBR)
15 January 2017; 16:00	1× (yellow card) 3× (suspension) 1× (red card)	Report	2× (yellow card) 3× (suspension)	THF Sport Hall, Ankara; Attendance: 1,100; Referees: Stokes, Bartlett (GBR)

==== Group 3 ====
Pos	Team	Pld	W	D	L	GF	GA	GD	Pts	Qualification
1	Italy	4	3	0	1	103	92	+11	6 (Note: Italy 49–48 Luxembourg)	Qualification Phase 2
2	Luxembourg	4	3	0	1	114	102	+12	6	
3	Georgia	4	0	0	4	97	120	−23	0	

Source: Eurohandball
Rules for classification: 1) points; 2) head-to-head points; 3) head-to-head goal difference; 4) head-to-head number of goals scored; 5) goal difference.
Notes:

2 November 2016; 17:30	Italy	26–19	Georgia	Palasport Concetto Lo Bello, Siracusa; Attendance: 2,100; Referees: Manea, Iliescu (ROU)
2 November 2016; 17:30	Turkovic 10	(11–10)	Chanturia 6	Palasport Concetto Lo Bello, Siracusa; Attendance: 2,100; Referees: Manea, Iliescu (ROU)
2 November 2016; 17:30	3× (yellow card) 2× (suspension)	Report	3× (yellow card) 3× (suspension) 1× (red card)	Palasport Concetto Lo Bello, Siracusa; Attendance: 2,100; Referees: Manea, Iliescu (ROU)

6 November 2016; 18:00	Georgia	25–28	Italy	Olympic Handball Arena, Tbilisi; Attendance: 1,500; Referees: Jerlecki, Labun (POL)
6 November 2016; 18:00	Chikovani 11	(13–13)	Turkovic 7	Olympic Handball Arena, Tbilisi; Attendance: 1,500; Referees: Jerlecki, Labun (POL)
6 November 2016; 18:00	2× (yellow card) 2× (suspension)	Report	2× (yellow card) 4× (suspension)	Olympic Handball Arena, Tbilisi; Attendance: 1,500; Referees: Jerlecki, Labun (POL)

4 January 2017; 18:00	Georgia	24–31	Luxembourg	Olympic Handball Arena, Tbilisi; Attendance: 300; Referees: Sirbu, Suponicov (MDA)
4 January 2017; 18:00	Chikovani 8	(12—11)	Muller 7	Olympic Handball Arena, Tbilisi; Attendance: 300; Referees: Sirbu, Suponicov (MDA)
4 January 2017; 18:00	3× (yellow card) 4× (suspension)	Report	2× (yellow card) 2× (suspension)	Olympic Handball Arena, Tbilisi; Attendance: 300; Referees: Sirbu, Suponicov (MDA)

7 January 2017; 18:00	Luxembourg	35–29	Georgia	d'Coque, Luxembourg City; Attendance: 800; Referees: Lillepea, Kull (EST)
7 January 2017; 18:00	Kohl, Schröder 7	(18–13)	Chanturia 7	d'Coque, Luxembourg City; Attendance: 800; Referees: Lillepea, Kull (EST)
7 January 2017; 18:00	2× (yellow card) 5× (suspension) 1× (red card)	Report	2× (yellow card) 2× (suspension)	d'Coque, Luxembourg City; Attendance: 800; Referees: Lillepea, Kull (EST)

11 January 2017; 19:30	Luxembourg	24–23	Italy	d'Coque, Luxembourg City; Attendance: 1,200; Referees: Kékes, Kékes (HUN)
11 January 2017; 19:30	Muller 6	(13–10)	Turkovic 7	d'Coque, Luxembourg City; Attendance: 1,200; Referees: Kékes, Kékes (HUN)
11 January 2017; 19:30	3× (yellow card) 7× (suspension)	Report	2× (yellow card) 5× (suspension)	d'Coque, Luxembourg City; Attendance: 1,200; Referees: Kékes, Kékes (HUN)

15 January 2017; 16:30	Italy	26–24	Luxembourg	Palasport Concetto Lo Bello, Siracusa; Attendance: 1,500; Referees: Hájek, Macho (CZE)
15 January 2017; 16:30	Turkovic 10	(12–9)	Y. Hoffmann 9	Palasport Concetto Lo Bello, Siracusa; Attendance: 1,500; Referees: Hájek, Macho (CZE)
15 January 2017; 16:30	2× (yellow card) 7× (suspension)	Report	3× (yellow card) 7× (suspension) 1× (red card)	Palasport Concetto Lo Bello, Siracusa; Attendance: 1,500; Referees: Hájek, Macho (CZE)

== IHF Emerging Nations Championship ==
The three best placed European teams of this tournament qualified to the Phase 2.

Rank	Team
Gold medal	Faroe Islands
Silver medal	Turkey
Bronze medal	Kosovo
4	Cyprus
5	Bulgaria
6	Luxembourg
7	Georgia
8	Moldova
9	Azerbaijan
10	Great Britain
11	Ireland
12	Malta
13	Andorra
14	Albania
15	Armenia

- Note: China finished in sixth place but is not a European nation.

== Qualification Phase 2 ==
Twenty-six pre-qualified teams joined the six qualified teams from previous rounds. Those 32 teams were split into eight groups, with the winners and runner-ups qualifying for the final tournament, as well as the four best third-placed teams. The draw for the qualification round was held on 12 April 2018 in Trondheim, Norway.

Pot 1	Pot 2	Pot 3	Pot 4
France; Croatia; Germany; Denmark; Slovenia; Belarus; Hungary; North Macedonia	Russia; Czech Republic; Poland; Iceland; Serbia; Montenegro; Netherlands; Portugal	Latvia; Lithuania; Switzerland; Slovakia; Ukraine; Israel; Turkey; Bosnia and Herzegovina	Finland; Belgium; Estonia; Greece; Romania; Italy; Kosovo; Faroe Islands

As Bosnia and Herzegovina, the Netherlands and Portugal had the same points in the national team ranking, an extra draw was held just before the actual draw in which the two first teams drawn were placed in pot 2, while the third went into pot 3. Netherlands and Portugal were drawn to be in pot 2. Furthermore, for political reasons, Serbia and Kosovo could not be drawn into the same group.

=== Group 1 ===
Pos	Team	Pld	W	D	L	GF	GA	GD	Pts	Qualification
1	Germany	6	6	0	0	190	119	+71	12	Final tournament
2	Poland	6	2	1	3	152	139	+13	5	Final tournament
3	Israel	6	2	0	4	148	178	−30	4	
4	Kosovo	6	1	1	4	118	172	−54	3	

Source: Eurohandball
Rules for classification: 1) points; 2) head-to-head points; 3) head-to-head goal difference; 4) head-to-head number of goals scored; 5) goal difference.

24 October 2018; 18:00	Poland	37–13	Kosovo	Hala KSZO, Ostrowiec; Attendance: 2,500; Referees: Butskevich, Butskevich (BLR)
24 October 2018; 18:00	Paczkowski 6	(15–5)	Terziqi 4	Hala KSZO, Ostrowiec; Attendance: 2,500; Referees: Butskevich, Butskevich (BLR)
24 October 2018; 18:00	2× (yellow card) 3× (suspension)	Report	2× (yellow card) 5× (suspension)	Hala KSZO, Ostrowiec; Attendance: 2,500; Referees: Butskevich, Butskevich (BLR)

24 October 2018; 19:00	Germany	37–21	Israel	Rittal Arena Wetzlar, Wetzlar; Attendance: 4,347; Referees: Gasmi, Gasmi (FRA)
24 October 2018; 19:00	Gensheimer, Reichmann 7	(19–9)	Pomeranz 5	Rittal Arena Wetzlar, Wetzlar; Attendance: 4,347; Referees: Gasmi, Gasmi (FRA)
24 October 2018; 19:00	1× (yellow card) 3× (suspension)	Report	2× (yellow card) 3× (suspension)	Rittal Arena Wetzlar, Wetzlar; Attendance: 4,347; Referees: Gasmi, Gasmi (FRA)

28 October 2018; 18:45	Israel	25–24	Poland	Drive in Arena, Tel Aviv; Attendance: 1,300; Referees: Argyridis, Mouttas (CYP)
28 October 2018; 18:45	Levy, Stelman 6	(12–12)	Moryto 6	Drive in Arena, Tel Aviv; Attendance: 1,300; Referees: Argyridis, Mouttas (CYP)
28 October 2018; 18:45	2× (yellow card) 6× (suspension)	Report	2× (yellow card) 4× (suspension)	Drive in Arena, Tel Aviv; Attendance: 1,300; Referees: Argyridis, Mouttas (CYP)

28 October 2018; 19:30	Kosovo	14–30	Germany	Pallati i Rinisë dhe Sporteve, Pristina; Attendance: 2,000; Referees: Leandersson, Lindroos (FIN)
28 October 2018; 19:30	Terziqi 5	(5–15)	Gensheimer, Semper 4	Pallati i Rinisë dhe Sporteve, Pristina; Attendance: 2,000; Referees: Leandersson, Lindroos (FIN)
28 October 2018; 19:30	2× (yellow card) 3× (suspension)	Report	1× (yellow card)	Pallati i Rinisë dhe Sporteve, Pristina; Attendance: 2,000; Referees: Leandersson, Lindroos (FIN)

10 April 2019; 18:00	Poland	18–26	Germany	Gliwice Arena, Gliwice; Attendance: 9,550; Referees: Brunovský, Canda (SVK)
10 April 2019; 18:00	Jarosiewicz 5	(10–13)	Gensheimer 9	Gliwice Arena, Gliwice; Attendance: 9,550; Referees: Brunovský, Canda (SVK)
10 April 2019; 18:00	2× (yellow card) 2× (suspension)	Report	2× (yellow card) 2× (suspension)	Gliwice Arena, Gliwice; Attendance: 9,550; Referees: Brunovský, Canda (SVK)

10 April 2019; 19:15	Kosovo	27–24	Israel	Pallati i Rinisë dhe Sporteve, Pristina; Attendance: 1,500; Referees: Di Domenico, Fornasier (ITA)
10 April 2019; 19:15	Dedaj 10	(12–8)	Hamami 6	Pallati i Rinisë dhe Sporteve, Pristina; Attendance: 1,500; Referees: Di Domenico, Fornasier (ITA)
10 April 2019; 19:15	3× (yellow card) 7× (suspension)	Report	4× (yellow card) 4× (suspension)	Pallati i Rinisë dhe Sporteve, Pristina; Attendance: 1,500; Referees: Di Domenico, Fornasier (ITA)

13 April 2019; 14:00	Germany	29–24	Poland	Gerry Weber Stadion, Halle; Attendance: 10,400; Referees: Nikolov, Nachevski (MKD)
13 April 2019; 14:00	Gensheimer 10	(16–16)	Daszek 6	Gerry Weber Stadion, Halle; Attendance: 10,400; Referees: Nikolov, Nachevski (MKD)
13 April 2019; 14:00	2× (yellow card) 4× (suspension)	Report	2× (yellow card) 2× (suspension)	Gerry Weber Stadion, Halle; Attendance: 10,400; Referees: Nikolov, Nachevski (MKD)

14 April 2019; 18:00	Israel	30–24	Kosovo	Drive in Arena, Tel Aviv; Attendance: 800; Referees: Pârvu, Potîrniche (ROU)
14 April 2019; 18:00	Pomeranz 6	(11–9)	Abdullahi, Ahmeti 4	Drive in Arena, Tel Aviv; Attendance: 800; Referees: Pârvu, Potîrniche (ROU)
14 April 2019; 18:00	2× (yellow card) 4× (suspension) 1× (red card)	Report	3× (yellow card) 6× (suspension)	Drive in Arena, Tel Aviv; Attendance: 800; Referees: Pârvu, Potîrniche (ROU)

12 June 2019; 19:45	Israel	25–40	Germany	Drive in Arena, Tel Aviv; Attendance: 1,700; Referees: Andorka, Hucker (HUN)
12 June 2019; 19:45	Mosindi 6	(14–19)	Kastening 9	Drive in Arena, Tel Aviv; Attendance: 1,700; Referees: Andorka, Hucker (HUN)
12 June 2019; 19:45	2× (yellow card) 2× (suspension)	Report	3× (yellow card) 6× (suspension)	Drive in Arena, Tel Aviv; Attendance: 1,700; Referees: Andorka, Hucker (HUN)

12 June 2019; 20:00	Kosovo	23–23	Poland	Pallati i Rinisë dhe Sporteve, Pristina; Attendance: 1,300; Referees: Smailagic, Smailagic (SWE)
12 June 2019; 20:00	Dedaj, Kabashi 5	(14–13)	Potoczny 5	Pallati i Rinisë dhe Sporteve, Pristina; Attendance: 1,300; Referees: Smailagic, Smailagic (SWE)
12 June 2019; 20:00	2× (yellow card) 4× (suspension)	Report	1× (yellow card) 2× (suspension)	Pallati i Rinisë dhe Sporteve, Pristina; Attendance: 1,300; Referees: Smailagic, Smailagic (SWE)

16 June 2019; 18:00	Germany	28–17	Kosovo	Nuremberg Arena, Nuremberg; Attendance: 7,187; Referees: Hofer, Schmidhuber (AUT)
16 June 2019; 18:00	Golla 6	(16–5)	Terziqi 8	Nuremberg Arena, Nuremberg; Attendance: 7,187; Referees: Hofer, Schmidhuber (AUT)
16 June 2019; 18:00	1× (yellow card) 3× (suspension)	Report	2× (yellow card) 4× (suspension) 1× (red card)	Nuremberg Arena, Nuremberg; Attendance: 7,187; Referees: Hofer, Schmidhuber (AUT)

16 June 2019; 18:00	Poland	26–23	Israel	Orlen Arena, Płock; Attendance: 2,560; Referees: Konjičanin, Konjičanin (BIH)
16 June 2019; 18:00	Moryto 8	(10–11)	Hershkowitz 5	Orlen Arena, Płock; Attendance: 2,560; Referees: Konjičanin, Konjičanin (BIH)
16 June 2019; 18:00	3× (yellow card) 5× (suspension)	Report	3× (yellow card) 4× (suspension)	Orlen Arena, Płock; Attendance: 2,560; Referees: Konjičanin, Konjičanin (BIH)

=== Group 2 ===
Pos	Team	Pld	W	D	L	GF	GA	GD	Pts	Qualification
1	Croatia	6	5	1	0	174	148	+26	11	Final tournament
2	Switzerland	6	3	0	3	180	167	+13	6 (Note: Switzerland 60–56 Serbia)	Final tournament
3	Serbia	6	2	2	2	168	165	+3	6	Final tournament
4	Belgium	6	0	1	5	144	186	−42	1	

Source: Eurohandball
Rules for classification: 1) points; 2) head-to-head points; 3) head-to-head goal difference; 4) head-to-head number of goals scored; 5) goal difference.
Notes:

24 October 2018; 18:00	Serbia	27–27	Belgium	Crystal Hall, Zrenjanin; Attendance: 2,500; Referees: Madsen, Mortensen (DEN)
24 October 2018; 18:00	Kukić 6	(15–14)	D.Kedziora 7	Crystal Hall, Zrenjanin; Attendance: 2,500; Referees: Madsen, Mortensen (DEN)
24 October 2018; 18:00	3× (yellow card) 3× (suspension)	Report	1× (yellow card) 4× (suspension)	Crystal Hall, Zrenjanin; Attendance: 2,500; Referees: Madsen, Mortensen (DEN)

25 October 2018; 20:15	Croatia	31–28	Switzerland	Gradski vrt Hall, Osijek; Attendance: 3,538; Referees: Nabokau, Kulik (BLR)
25 October 2018; 20:15	Cindrić, Stepančić 6	(15–16)	Schmid 8	Gradski vrt Hall, Osijek; Attendance: 3,538; Referees: Nabokau, Kulik (BLR)
25 October 2018; 20:15	2× (yellow card) 2× (suspension)	Report	2× (yellow card) 2× (suspension) 1× (red card)	Gradski vrt Hall, Osijek; Attendance: 3,538; Referees: Nabokau, Kulik (BLR)

28 October 2018; 13:15	Switzerland	29–24	Serbia	Bossard Arena, Zug; Attendance: 4,176; Referees: Baranowski, Lemanowicz (POL)
28 October 2018; 13:15	Schmid 10	(12–11)	Ilić 8	Bossard Arena, Zug; Attendance: 4,176; Referees: Baranowski, Lemanowicz (POL)
28 October 2018; 13:15	3× (yellow card) 3× (suspension)	Report	3× (yellow card) 4× (suspension)	Bossard Arena, Zug; Attendance: 4,176; Referees: Baranowski, Lemanowicz (POL)

28 October 2018; 15:45	Belgium	25–30	Croatia	Sportoase Philipssite, Leuven; Attendance: 2,500; Referees: Santos, Fonseca (POR)
28 October 2018; 15:45	Bolaers 4	(12–18)	Horvat 8	Sportoase Philipssite, Leuven; Attendance: 2,500; Referees: Santos, Fonseca (POR)
28 October 2018; 15:45	2× (yellow card) 6× (suspension)	Report	2× (yellow card) 5× (suspension)	Sportoase Philipssite, Leuven; Attendance: 2,500; Referees: Santos, Fonseca (POR)

10 April 2019; 20:10	Belgium	25–28	Switzerland	Sportoase Philipssite, Leuven; Attendance: 2,115; Referees: Horváth, Marton (HUN)
10 April 2019; 20:10	D.Kedziora 6	(10–16)	Schmid 7	Sportoase Philipssite, Leuven; Attendance: 2,115; Referees: Horváth, Marton (HUN)
10 April 2019; 20:10	2× (yellow card) 5× (suspension)	Report	2× (yellow card) 2× (suspension)	Sportoase Philipssite, Leuven; Attendance: 2,115; Referees: Horváth, Marton (HUN)

11 April 2019; 18:00	Serbia	25–25	Croatia	Štark Arena, Belgrade; Attendance: 7,959; Referees: Zotin, Volodkov (RUS)
11 April 2019; 18:00	three players 4	(13–13)	Duvnjak 6	Štark Arena, Belgrade; Attendance: 7,959; Referees: Zotin, Volodkov (RUS)
11 April 2019; 18:00	2× (yellow card) 4× (suspension)	Report	3× (yellow card) 4× (suspension)	Štark Arena, Belgrade; Attendance: 7,959; Referees: Zotin, Volodkov (RUS)

14 April 2019; 14:00	Switzerland	36–22	Belgium	BBC-Arena, Schaffhausen; Attendance: 3,500; Referees: Opava, Valek (CZE)
14 April 2019; 14:00	Lier 9	(16–11)	B.Kedziora 8	BBC-Arena, Schaffhausen; Attendance: 3,500; Referees: Opava, Valek (CZE)
14 April 2019; 14:00	2× (yellow card) 2× (suspension)	Report	2× (yellow card) 5× (suspension)	BBC-Arena, Schaffhausen; Attendance: 3,500; Referees: Opava, Valek (CZE)

14 April 2019; 20:30	Croatia	27–23	Serbia	Krešimir Ćosić Hall, Zadar; Attendance: 6,500; Referees: Brunovský, Canda (SVK)
14 April 2019; 20:30	Štrlek 8	(17–11)	four players 3	Krešimir Ćosić Hall, Zadar; Attendance: 6,500; Referees: Brunovský, Canda (SVK)
14 April 2019; 20:30	2× (yellow card) 4× (suspension)	Report	2× (yellow card) 2× (suspension)	Krešimir Ćosić Hall, Zadar; Attendance: 6,500; Referees: Brunovský, Canda (SVK)

12 June 2019; 18:15	Switzerland	28–33	Croatia	Bossard Arena, Zug; Attendance: 6,135; Referees: López, Ramírez (ESP)
12 June 2019; 18:15	Schmid 15	(13–17)	Stepančić 8	Bossard Arena, Zug; Attendance: 6,135; Referees: López, Ramírez (ESP)
12 June 2019; 18:15	3× (yellow card) 4× (suspension)	Report	2× (yellow card) 4× (suspension)	Bossard Arena, Zug; Attendance: 6,135; Referees: López, Ramírez (ESP)

12 June 2019; 20:00	Belgium	26–37	Serbia	Sportoase Philipssite, Leuven; Attendance: 1,100; Referees: Elíasson, Pálsson (ISL)
12 June 2019; 20:00	D.Kedziora 7	(10–20)	Radivojević 8	Sportoase Philipssite, Leuven; Attendance: 1,100; Referees: Elíasson, Pálsson (ISL)
12 June 2019; 20:00	3× (yellow card) 3× (suspension)	Report	2× (yellow card) 4× (suspension) 2× (red card)	Sportoase Philipssite, Leuven; Attendance: 1,100; Referees: Elíasson, Pálsson (ISL)

16 June 2019; 18:00	Croatia	28–19	Belgium	Žatika Sport Centre, Poreč; Attendance: 2,800; Referees: Harabagiu, Stănescu (ROU)
16 June 2019; 18:00	Mandić, Mrakovčić 5	(15–9)	B.Kedziora 4	Žatika Sport Centre, Poreč; Attendance: 2,800; Referees: Harabagiu, Stănescu (ROU)
16 June 2019; 18:00	2× (yellow card) 3× (suspension)	Report	3× (yellow card) 5× (suspension)	Žatika Sport Centre, Poreč; Attendance: 2,800; Referees: Harabagiu, Stănescu (ROU)

16 June 2019; 18:00	Serbia	32–31	Switzerland	SPENS, Novi Sad; Attendance: 6,000; Referees: Sondors, Līcis (LAT)
16 June 2019; 18:00	Radivojević 8	(19–17)	Tynowski, Schmid 6	SPENS, Novi Sad; Attendance: 6,000; Referees: Sondors, Līcis (LAT)
16 June 2019; 18:00	3× (yellow card) 3× (suspension)	Report	1× (yellow card) 7× (suspension)	SPENS, Novi Sad; Attendance: 6,000; Referees: Sondors, Līcis (LAT)

=== Group 3 ===
Pos	Team	Pld	W	D	L	GF	GA	GD	Pts	Qualification
1	North Macedonia	6	4	1	1	168	160	+8	9	Final tournament
2	Iceland	6	3	2	1	185	151	+34	8	Final tournament
3	Turkey	6	2	0	4	148	167	−19	4	
4	Greece	6	1	1	4	145	168	−23	3	

Source: Eurohandball
Rules for classification: 1) points; 2) head-to-head points; 3) head-to-head goal difference; 4) head-to-head number of goals scored; 5) goal difference.

24 October 2018; 21:45	Iceland	35–21	Greece	Laugardalshöll, Reykjavík; Attendance: 1,450; Referees: Pavićević, Ražnatović (MNE)
24 October 2018; 21:45	Elísson 6	(17–13)	three players 4	Laugardalshöll, Reykjavík; Attendance: 1,450; Referees: Pavićević, Ražnatović (MNE)
24 October 2018; 21:45	5× (suspension) 1× (red card)	Report	1× (yellow card) 9× (suspension) 1× (red card)	Laugardalshöll, Reykjavík; Attendance: 1,450; Referees: Pavićević, Ražnatović (MNE)

25 October 2018; 20:15	North Macedonia	31–27	Turkey	Sports Hall Mladost, Bitola; Attendance: 4,100; Referees: Herczeg, Südi (HUN)
25 October 2018; 20:15	Lazarov 8	(17–13)	Biçer 6	Sports Hall Mladost, Bitola; Attendance: 4,100; Referees: Herczeg, Südi (HUN)
25 October 2018; 20:15	2× (yellow card) 1× (suspension)	Report	3× (yellow card) 2× (suspension)	Sports Hall Mladost, Bitola; Attendance: 4,100; Referees: Herczeg, Südi (HUN)

28 October 2018; 14:00	Turkey	22–33	Iceland	THF Sport Hall, Ankara; Attendance: 1,570; Referees: Caçador, Nicolau (POR)
28 October 2018; 14:00	Ersin 5	(13–16)	Jónsson 9	THF Sport Hall, Ankara; Attendance: 1,570; Referees: Caçador, Nicolau (POR)
28 October 2018; 14:00	3× (yellow card) 6× (suspension)	Report	2× (yellow card) 5× (suspension)	THF Sport Hall, Ankara; Attendance: 1,570; Referees: Caçador, Nicolau (POR)

28 October 2018; 16:00	Greece	28–26	North Macedonia	Lefkovrisi Sports Center, Kozani; Attendance: 605; Referees: Baumgart, Wild (GER)
28 October 2018; 16:00	Mallios 9	(12–13)	K. Lazarov 8	Lefkovrisi Sports Center, Kozani; Attendance: 605; Referees: Baumgart, Wild (GER)
28 October 2018; 16:00	3× (yellow card) 4× (suspension)	Report	2× (yellow card) 4× (suspension)	Lefkovrisi Sports Center, Kozani; Attendance: 605; Referees: Baumgart, Wild (GER)

10 April 2019; 17:00	Greece	22–26	Turkey	Lefkovrisi Sports Center, Kozani; Attendance: 2,000; Referees: Lah, Sok (SLO)
10 April 2019; 17:00	Mylonas 7	(11–11)	Biçer 7	Lefkovrisi Sports Center, Kozani; Attendance: 2,000; Referees: Lah, Sok (SLO)
10 April 2019; 17:00	1× (yellow card) 3× (suspension)	Report	3× (yellow card) 5× (suspension)	Lefkovrisi Sports Center, Kozani; Attendance: 2,000; Referees: Lah, Sok (SLO)

10 April 2019; 21:45	Iceland	33–34	North Macedonia	Laugardalshöll, Reykjavík; Attendance: 1,973; Referees: Gasmi, Gasmi (FRA)
10 April 2019; 21:45	Pálmarsson 12	(17–17)	Georgievski, Manaskov 8	Laugardalshöll, Reykjavík; Attendance: 1,973; Referees: Gasmi, Gasmi (FRA)
10 April 2019; 21:45	2× (yellow card) 3× (suspension) 1× (red card)	Report	2× (yellow card) 7× (suspension)	Laugardalshöll, Reykjavík; Attendance: 1,973; Referees: Gasmi, Gasmi (FRA)

14 April 2019; 16:00	Turkey	26–23	Greece	Porsuk Spor Salonu, Eskişehir; Attendance: 2,200; Referees: Kurtagic, Wetterwik (SWE)
14 April 2019; 16:00	Biçer 6	(12–9)	Tziras 12	Porsuk Spor Salonu, Eskişehir; Attendance: 2,200; Referees: Kurtagic, Wetterwik (SWE)
14 April 2019; 16:00	3× (yellow card) 5× (suspension)	Report	1× (yellow card) 3× (suspension)	Porsuk Spor Salonu, Eskişehir; Attendance: 2,200; Referees: Kurtagic, Wetterwik (SWE)

14 April 2019; 20:00	North Macedonia	24–24	Iceland	Boris Trajkovski Sports Center, Skopje; Attendance: 6,963; Referees: Sondors, Līcis (LAT)
14 April 2019; 20:00	Lazarov 8	(10–11)	Magnússon 8	Boris Trajkovski Sports Center, Skopje; Attendance: 6,963; Referees: Sondors, Līcis (LAT)
14 April 2019; 20:00	2× (yellow card) 1× (suspension)	Report	2× (yellow card) 2× (suspension)	Boris Trajkovski Sports Center, Skopje; Attendance: 6,963; Referees: Sondors, Līcis (LAT)

12 June 2019; 19:00	Turkey	25–26	North Macedonia	Porsuk Spor Salonu, Eskişehir; Attendance: 1,850; Referees: Zotin, Volodkov (RUS)
12 June 2019; 19:00	Pehlivan 10	(13–11)	K. Lazarov 7	Porsuk Spor Salonu, Eskişehir; Attendance: 1,850; Referees: Zotin, Volodkov (RUS)
12 June 2019; 19:00	3× (yellow card) 3× (suspension)	Report	2× (yellow card) 1× (suspension)	Porsuk Spor Salonu, Eskişehir; Attendance: 1,850; Referees: Zotin, Volodkov (RUS)

12 June 2019; 20:00	Greece	28–28	Iceland	Lefkovrisi Sports Center, Kozani; Attendance: 600; Referees: Pandžić, Šatordžija (BIH)
12 June 2019; 20:00	Tziras 9	(12–15)	Gunnarsson 9	Lefkovrisi Sports Center, Kozani; Attendance: 600; Referees: Pandžić, Šatordžija (BIH)
12 June 2019; 20:00	3× (yellow card) 4× (suspension)	Report	3× (yellow card) 1× (suspension)	Lefkovrisi Sports Center, Kozani; Attendance: 600; Referees: Pandžić, Šatordžija (BIH)

16 June 2019; 16:00	Iceland	32–22	Turkey	Laugardalshöll, Reykjavík; Attendance: 2,100; Referees: Čerņavskis, Bogdanovs (LAT)
16 June 2019; 16:00	Elísson 11	(12–9)	Öztürk, Pehlivan 5	Laugardalshöll, Reykjavík; Attendance: 2,100; Referees: Čerņavskis, Bogdanovs (LAT)
16 June 2019; 16:00	2× (yellow card) 2× (suspension)	Report	2× (yellow card) 4× (suspension)	Laugardalshöll, Reykjavík; Attendance: 2,100; Referees: Čerņavskis, Bogdanovs (LAT)

16 June 2019; 18:00	North Macedonia	27–23	Greece	Park Sports Hall, Strumica; Attendance: 2,300; Referees: Brkic, Jusufhodzic (AUT)
16 June 2019; 18:00	Lazarov 6	(13–11)	Tziras 6	Park Sports Hall, Strumica; Attendance: 2,300; Referees: Brkic, Jusufhodzic (AUT)
16 June 2019; 18:00	1× (yellow card) 5× (suspension)	Report	3× (yellow card) 3× (suspension)	Park Sports Hall, Strumica; Attendance: 2,300; Referees: Brkic, Jusufhodzic (AUT)

=== Group 4 ===
Pos	Team	Pld	W	D	L	GF	GA	GD	Pts	Qualification
1	Slovenia	6	5	0	1	171	143	+28	10	Final tournament
2	Latvia	6	4	0	2	150	143	+7	8	Final tournament
3	Netherlands	6	3	0	3	167	159	+8	6	Final tournament
4	Estonia	6	0	0	6	142	185	−43	0	

Source: Eurohandball
Rules for classification: 1) points; 2) head-to-head points; 3) head-to-head goal difference; 4) head-to-head number of goals scored; 5) goal difference.

24 October 2018; 20:15	Slovenia	27–21	Latvia	Ljudski vrt Sports Hall, Maribor; Attendance: 2,300; Referees: Jørum, Kleven (NOR)
24 October 2018; 20:15	Janc, Šoštarič 5	(14–7)	Veršakovs 6	Ljudski vrt Sports Hall, Maribor; Attendance: 2,300; Referees: Jørum, Kleven (NOR)
24 October 2018; 20:15	6× (suspension) 1× (red card)	Report	1× (yellow card) 4× (suspension) 2× (red card)	Ljudski vrt Sports Hall, Maribor; Attendance: 2,300; Referees: Jørum, Kleven (NOR)

25 October 2018; 19:30	Netherlands	35–25	Estonia	Fitland XL, Sittard; Attendance: 1,500; Referees: Mata, López (ESP)
25 October 2018; 19:30	Adams 6	(17–10)	Toom 7	Fitland XL, Sittard; Attendance: 1,500; Referees: Mata, López (ESP)
25 October 2018; 19:30	2× (yellow card) 4× (suspension)	Report	2× (yellow card) 2× (suspension)	Fitland XL, Sittard; Attendance: 1,500; Referees: Mata, López (ESP)

28 October 2018; 14:10	Latvia	29–25	Netherlands	Vidzemes Olympic Centre, Valmiera; Attendance: 1,100; Referees: Brunovský, Čanda (SVK)
28 October 2018; 14:10	Veršakovs 11	(17–11)	Schagen 5	Vidzemes Olympic Centre, Valmiera; Attendance: 1,100; Referees: Brunovský, Čanda (SVK)
28 October 2018; 14:10	1× (yellow card) 4× (suspension)	Report	3× (yellow card) 3× (suspension)	Vidzemes Olympic Centre, Valmiera; Attendance: 1,100; Referees: Brunovský, Čanda (SVK)

28 October 2018; 18:30	Estonia	20–31	Slovenia	Kalev Sports Hall, Tallinn; Attendance: 920; Referees: Schulze, Tönnies (GER)
28 October 2018; 18:30	four players 3	(11–16)	Cingesar 7	Kalev Sports Hall, Tallinn; Attendance: 920; Referees: Schulze, Tönnies (GER)
28 October 2018; 18:30	2× (yellow card) 6× (suspension)	Report	3× (yellow card) 3× (suspension)	Kalev Sports Hall, Tallinn; Attendance: 920; Referees: Schulze, Tönnies (GER)

11 April 2019; 18:30	Estonia	18–24	Latvia	Kalev Sports Hall, Tallinn; Attendance: 600; Referees: Konjičanin, Konjičanin (BIH)
11 April 2019; 18:30	Jaanimaa, Toom 4	(11–10)	Strazdins 5	Kalev Sports Hall, Tallinn; Attendance: 600; Referees: Konjičanin, Konjičanin (BIH)
11 April 2019; 18:30	1× (yellow card) 5× (suspension)	Report	3× (yellow card) 6× (suspension)	Kalev Sports Hall, Tallinn; Attendance: 600; Referees: Konjičanin, Konjičanin (BIH)

11 April 2019; 19:30	Netherlands	26–27	Slovenia	Topsportcentrum, Almere; Attendance: 1,400; Referees: Bonifert, Oláh (HUN)
11 April 2019; 19:30	Boomhouwer 8	(12–11)	Janc 9	Topsportcentrum, Almere; Attendance: 1,400; Referees: Bonifert, Oláh (HUN)
11 April 2019; 19:30	2× (yellow card) 3× (suspension)	Report	2× (yellow card) 5× (suspension)	Topsportcentrum, Almere; Attendance: 1,400; Referees: Bonifert, Oláh (HUN)

14 April 2019; 14:10	Latvia	30–24	Estonia	Vidzemes Olympic Centre, Valmiera; Attendance: 1,450; Referees: Gousko, Repkin (BLR)
14 April 2019; 14:10	Politers 5	(17–12)	Sillaste, Timmo 4	Vidzemes Olympic Centre, Valmiera; Attendance: 1,450; Referees: Gousko, Repkin (BLR)
14 April 2019; 14:10	1× (yellow card) 5× (suspension)	Report	3× (yellow card) 2× (suspension)	Vidzemes Olympic Centre, Valmiera; Attendance: 1,450; Referees: Gousko, Repkin (BLR)

14 April 2019; 17:00	Slovenia	30–23	Netherlands	Dvorana Zlatorog, Celje; Attendance: 4,100; Referees: Brunner, Salah (SUI)
14 April 2019; 17:00	Zarabec 5	(16–11)	three players 4	Dvorana Zlatorog, Celje; Attendance: 4,100; Referees: Brunner, Salah (SUI)
14 April 2019; 17:00	1× (yellow card) 5× (suspension)	Report	3× (yellow card) 5× (suspension)	Dvorana Zlatorog, Celje; Attendance: 4,100; Referees: Brunner, Salah (SUI)

12 June 2019; 19:40	Latvia	25–24	Slovenia	Vidzemes Olympic Centre, Valmiera; Attendance: 1,450; Referees: Gjeding, Hansen (DEN)
12 June 2019; 19:40	Krištopāns 13	(14–10)	Dolenec 8	Vidzemes Olympic Centre, Valmiera; Attendance: 1,450; Referees: Gjeding, Hansen (DEN)
12 June 2019; 19:40	1× (yellow card) 1× (suspension)	Report	1× (yellow card) 1× (suspension)	Vidzemes Olympic Centre, Valmiera; Attendance: 1,450; Referees: Gjeding, Hansen (DEN)

13 June 2019; 18:30	Estonia	27–33	Netherlands	Kalev Sports Hall, Tallinn; Attendance: 400; Referees: Lindenbaum, Laron (ISR)
13 June 2019; 18:30	three players 6	(13–16)	four players 4	Kalev Sports Hall, Tallinn; Attendance: 400; Referees: Lindenbaum, Laron (ISR)
13 June 2019; 18:30	2× (yellow card) 4× (suspension)	Report	2× (yellow card) 6× (suspension)	Kalev Sports Hall, Tallinn; Attendance: 400; Referees: Lindenbaum, Laron (ISR)

16 June 2019; 18:00	Slovenia	32–28	Estonia	Arena Bonifika, Koper; Attendance: 1,800; Referees: Chaskis, Tsakonas (GRE)
16 June 2019; 18:00	Marguč 7	(19–11)	Toom 8	Arena Bonifika, Koper; Attendance: 1,800; Referees: Chaskis, Tsakonas (GRE)
16 June 2019; 18:00	3× (yellow card) 4× (suspension)	Report	3× (yellow card) 5× (suspension)	Arena Bonifika, Koper; Attendance: 1,800; Referees: Chaskis, Tsakonas (GRE)

16 June 2019; 18:00	Netherlands	25–21	Latvia	Topsportcentrum, Almere; Attendance: 1,600; Referees: Leszczyński, Piechota (POL)
16 June 2019; 18:00	Schagen, Steins 4	(13–11)	Veršakovs 5	Topsportcentrum, Almere; Attendance: 1,600; Referees: Leszczyński, Piechota (POL)
16 June 2019; 18:00	3× (yellow card) 3× (suspension)	Report	3× (yellow card) 4× (suspension)	Topsportcentrum, Almere; Attendance: 1,600; Referees: Leszczyński, Piechota (POL)

=== Group 5 ===
Pos	Team	Pld	W	D	L	GF	GA	GD	Pts	Qualification
1	Czech Republic	6	4	0	2	161	150	+11	8 (Note: Czech Republic 4 Pts, +5 GD; Belarus 4 Pts, +4 GD; Bosnia and Herzegovina 4 Pts, −9 GD)	Final tournament
2	Belarus	6	4	0	2	182	146	+36	8	Final tournament
3	Bosnia and Herzegovina	6	4	0	2	160	153	+7	8	Final tournament
4	Finland	6	0	0	6	131	185	−54	0	

Source: Eurohandball
Rules for classification: 1) points; 2) head-to-head points; 3) head-to-head goal difference; 4) head-to-head number of goals scored; 5) goal difference.
Notes:

24 October 2018; 18:00	Czech Republic	31–27	Finland	Městská sportovní hala, Plzeň; Attendance: 1,300; Referees: Nikolić, Stojković (SRB)
24 October 2018; 18:00	Babák 7	(15–12)	Tamminen 10	Městská sportovní hala, Plzeň; Attendance: 1,300; Referees: Nikolić, Stojković (SRB)
24 October 2018; 18:00	3× (yellow card) 2× (suspension)	Report	3× (yellow card) 4× (suspension)	Městská sportovní hala, Plzeň; Attendance: 1,300; Referees: Nikolić, Stojković (SRB)

25 October 2018; 18:00	Belarus	29–30	Bosnia and Herzegovina	Sport Palace Uruchje, Minsk; Attendance: 2,600; Referees: Leszczyński, Piechota (POL)
25 October 2018; 18:00	Vailupau 6	(16–12)	Nuić 7	Sport Palace Uruchje, Minsk; Attendance: 2,600; Referees: Leszczyński, Piechota (POL)
25 October 2018; 18:00	3× (yellow card) 3× (suspension) 1× (red card)	Report	3× (yellow card) 1× (suspension)	Sport Palace Uruchje, Minsk; Attendance: 2,600; Referees: Leszczyński, Piechota (POL)

27 October 2018; 16:00	Finland	20–27	Belarus	Energia Areena, Vantaa; Attendance: 1,150; Referees: Canbro, Kliko (SWE)
27 October 2018; 16:00	Tamminen 5	(8–15)	Shynkel 7	Energia Areena, Vantaa; Attendance: 1,150; Referees: Canbro, Kliko (SWE)
27 October 2018; 16:00	3× (yellow card) 2× (suspension)	Report	3× (yellow card) 3× (suspension)	Energia Areena, Vantaa; Attendance: 1,150; Referees: Canbro, Kliko (SWE)

27 October 2018; 20:00	Bosnia and Herzegovina	20–25	Czech Republic	KSPC Mejdan, Tuzla; Attendance: 4,000; Referees: Sondors, Līcis (LAT)
27 October 2018; 20:00	Panić 5	(10–12)	Hrstka 7	KSPC Mejdan, Tuzla; Attendance: 4,000; Referees: Sondors, Līcis (LAT)
27 October 2018; 20:00	2× (yellow card) 2× (suspension)	Report	2× (yellow card) 4× (suspension)	KSPC Mejdan, Tuzla; Attendance: 4,000; Referees: Sondors, Līcis (LAT)

10 April 2019; 18:10	Czech Republic	30–31	Belarus	Městská sportovní hala, Plzeň; Attendance: 1,600; Referees: Santos, Fonseca (POR)
10 April 2019; 18:10	Babák 8	(12–14)	three players 5	Městská sportovní hala, Plzeň; Attendance: 1,600; Referees: Santos, Fonseca (POR)
10 April 2019; 18:10	1× (yellow card) 4× (suspension) 1× (red card)	Report	2× (yellow card) 7× (suspension) 1× (red card)	Městská sportovní hala, Plzeň; Attendance: 1,600; Referees: Santos, Fonseca (POR)

11 April 2019; 17:30	Finland	26–30	Bosnia and Herzegovina	Energia Areena, Vantaa; Attendance: 1,200; Referees: Katsikis, Michailidis (GRE)
11 April 2019; 17:30	three players 5	(13–15)	Prce 10	Energia Areena, Vantaa; Attendance: 1,200; Referees: Katsikis, Michailidis (GRE)
11 April 2019; 17:30	3× (yellow card) 2× (suspension)	Report	1× (yellow card) 1× (suspension)	Energia Areena, Vantaa; Attendance: 1,200; Referees: Katsikis, Michailidis (GRE)

14 April 2019; 16:00	Belarus	24–26	Czech Republic	Sport Palace Uruchje, Minsk; Attendance: 2,700; Referees: Andorka, Hucker (HUN)
14 April 2019; 16:00	Baranau 5	(12–13)	Kašpárek 8	Sport Palace Uruchje, Minsk; Attendance: 2,700; Referees: Andorka, Hucker (HUN)
14 April 2019; 16:00	2× (yellow card) 2× (suspension)	Report	2× (yellow card) 3× (suspension)	Sport Palace Uruchje, Minsk; Attendance: 2,700; Referees: Andorka, Hucker (HUN)

14 April 2019; 17:00	Bosnia and Herzegovina	31–19	Finland	KSPC Mejdan, Tuzla; Attendance: 3,100; Referees: Erdoğan, Özdeni (TUR)
14 April 2019; 17:00	Hamidović, Malinović 5	(16–10)	Tamminen 4	KSPC Mejdan, Tuzla; Attendance: 3,100; Referees: Erdoğan, Özdeni (TUR)
14 April 2019; 17:00	2× (yellow card) 4× (suspension)	Report	3× (yellow card) 3× (suspension)	KSPC Mejdan, Tuzla; Attendance: 3,100; Referees: Erdoğan, Özdeni (TUR)

12 June 2019; 18:05	Finland	24–26	Czech Republic	Energia Areena, Vantaa; Attendance: 600; Referees: Pavićević, Ražnatović (MNE)
12 June 2019; 18:05	Granlund 6	(12–17)	Babák 6	Energia Areena, Vantaa; Attendance: 600; Referees: Pavićević, Ražnatović (MNE)
12 June 2019; 18:05	2× (yellow card) 4× (suspension)	Report	1× (yellow card) 3× (suspension)	Energia Areena, Vantaa; Attendance: 600; Referees: Pavićević, Ražnatović (MNE)

12 June 2019; 20:00	Bosnia and Herzegovina	25–31	Belarus	KSPC Mejdan, Tuzla; Attendance: 3,000; Referees: Mažeika, Gatelis (LTU)
12 June 2019; 20:00	Terzić 6	(12–17)	Kulesh, Shylovich 7	KSPC Mejdan, Tuzla; Attendance: 3,000; Referees: Mažeika, Gatelis (LTU)
12 June 2019; 20:00	3× (yellow card) 2× (suspension)	Report	3× (yellow card) 3× (suspension)	KSPC Mejdan, Tuzla; Attendance: 3,000; Referees: Mažeika, Gatelis (LTU)

16 June 2019; 18:00	Czech Republic	23–24	Bosnia and Herzegovina	Ostravar Aréna, Ostrava; Attendance: 5,521; Referees: Baumgart, Wild (GER)
16 June 2019; 18:00	Petrovský 7	(10–11)	Prce 9	Ostravar Aréna, Ostrava; Attendance: 5,521; Referees: Baumgart, Wild (GER)
16 June 2019; 18:00	1× (yellow card) 6× (suspension) 1× (red card)	Report	2× (yellow card) 4× (suspension)	Ostravar Aréna, Ostrava; Attendance: 5,521; Referees: Baumgart, Wild (GER)

16 June 2019; 19:00	Belarus	40–15	Finland	Sportshall Victoria, Brest; Attendance: 2,800; Referees: Lah, Sok (SLO)
16 June 2019; 19:00	five players 5	(20–8)	Sundberg 4	Sportshall Victoria, Brest; Attendance: 2,800; Referees: Lah, Sok (SLO)
16 June 2019; 19:00	1× (yellow card) 3× (suspension)	Report	2× (yellow card) 3× (suspension)	Sportshall Victoria, Brest; Attendance: 2,800; Referees: Lah, Sok (SLO)

=== Group 6 ===
Pos	Team	Pld	W	D	L	GF	GA	GD	Pts	Qualification
1	France	6	5	0	1	204	147	+57	10	Final tournament
2	Portugal	6	4	1	1	154	143	+11	9	Final tournament
3	Lithuania	6	1	1	4	142	182	−40	3	
4	Romania	6	1	0	5	129	157	−28	2	

Source: Eurohandball
Rules for classification: 1) points; 2) head-to-head points; 3) head-to-head goal difference; 4) head-to-head number of goals scored; 5) goal difference.

24 October 2018; 21:00	Portugal	21–13	Romania	Pavilhão Municipal, Santo Tirso; Attendance: 1,900; Referees: Konjičanin, Konjičanin (BIH)
24 October 2018; 21:00	Moreira, Rocha 3	(10–7)	Rotaru 5	Pavilhão Municipal, Santo Tirso; Attendance: 1,900; Referees: Konjičanin, Konjičanin (BIH)
24 October 2018; 21:00	3× (yellow card) 4× (suspension)	Report	2× (yellow card) 4× (suspension)	Pavilhão Municipal, Santo Tirso; Attendance: 1,900; Referees: Konjičanin, Konjičanin (BIH)

25 October 2018; 20:30	France	42–27	Lithuania	Arena du Pays d'Aix, Aix-en-Provence; Attendance: 6,000; Referees: Brunner, Salah (SUI)
25 October 2018; 20:30	Caucheteux 9	(21–10)	Dumčius 7	Arena du Pays d'Aix, Aix-en-Provence; Attendance: 6,000; Referees: Brunner, Salah (SUI)
25 October 2018; 20:30	1× (yellow card) 2× (suspension)	Report	3× (yellow card) 4× (suspension)	Arena du Pays d'Aix, Aix-en-Provence; Attendance: 6,000; Referees: Brunner, Salah (SUI)

28 October 2018; 15:30	Lithuania	23–24	Portugal	Švyturys Arena, Klaipėda; Attendance: 1,800; Referees: Kurtagic, Wetterwik (SWE)
28 October 2018; 15:30	Malašinskas 9	(10–12)	Duarte 7	Švyturys Arena, Klaipėda; Attendance: 1,800; Referees: Kurtagic, Wetterwik (SWE)
28 October 2018; 15:30	2× (yellow card) 2× (suspension)	Report	2× (yellow card) 4× (suspension)	Švyturys Arena, Klaipėda; Attendance: 1,800; Referees: Kurtagic, Wetterwik (SWE)

28 October 2018; 17:00	Romania	21–31	France	BT Arena, Cluj-Napoca; Attendance: 4,500; Referees: Lah, Sok (SLO)
28 October 2018; 17:00	Humet 5	(9–12)	Caucheteux, Remili 6	BT Arena, Cluj-Napoca; Attendance: 4,500; Referees: Lah, Sok (SLO)
28 October 2018; 17:00	2× (yellow card) 6× (suspension)	Report	1× (yellow card) 6× (suspension)	BT Arena, Cluj-Napoca; Attendance: 4,500; Referees: Lah, Sok (SLO)

11 April 2019; 17:00	Romania	28–23	Lithuania	Targoviste Sports Hall, Târgoviște; Attendance: 2,000; Referees: Brkic, Jusufhodzic (AUT)
11 April 2019; 17:00	Grigoraș 8	(16–13)	three players 3	Targoviste Sports Hall, Târgoviște; Attendance: 2,000; Referees: Brkic, Jusufhodzic (AUT)
11 April 2019; 17:00	2× (yellow card) 4× (suspension)	Report	2× (yellow card) 5× (suspension)	Targoviste Sports Hall, Târgoviște; Attendance: 2,000; Referees: Brkic, Jusufhodzic (AUT)

11 April 2019; 21:00	Portugal	33–27	France	Multusios de Guimarães, Guimarães; Attendance: 3,842; Referees: Gubica, Milošević (CRO)
11 April 2019; 21:00	Areia 6	(17–13)	Remili 7	Multusios de Guimarães, Guimarães; Attendance: 3,842; Referees: Gubica, Milošević (CRO)
11 April 2019; 21:00	3× (yellow card) 5× (suspension)	Report	1× (yellow card) 3× (suspension)	Multusios de Guimarães, Guimarães; Attendance: 3,842; Referees: Gubica, Milošević (CRO)

14 April 2019; 15:30	Lithuania	24–23	Romania	Švyturys Arena, Klaipėda; Attendance: 1,200; Referees: Schulze, Tönnies (GER)
14 April 2019; 15:30	P. Babarskas 5	(12–11)	Grigoraș 6	Švyturys Arena, Klaipėda; Attendance: 1,200; Referees: Schulze, Tönnies (GER)
14 April 2019; 15:30	4× (yellow card) 2× (suspension)	Report	2× (yellow card) 4× (suspension)	Švyturys Arena, Klaipėda; Attendance: 1,200; Referees: Schulze, Tönnies (GER)

14 April 2019; 17:30	France	33–24	Portugal	Rhénus Sport, Strasbourg; Attendance: 6,660; Referees: Mata, López (ESP)
14 April 2019; 17:30	Remili 7	(16–15)	Duarte 4	Rhénus Sport, Strasbourg; Attendance: 6,660; Referees: Mata, López (ESP)
14 April 2019; 17:30	2× (yellow card) 3× (suspension)	Report	2× (yellow card) 5× (suspension) 1× (red card)	Rhénus Sport, Strasbourg; Attendance: 6,660; Referees: Mata, López (ESP)

13 June 2019; 17:00	Romania	19–24	Portugal	Dinamo Polyvalent Hall, Bucharest; Attendance: 800; Referees: Opava, Valek (CZE)
13 June 2019; 17:00	Șimicu 6	(12–11)	Portela 7	Dinamo Polyvalent Hall, Bucharest; Attendance: 800; Referees: Opava, Valek (CZE)
13 June 2019; 17:00	2× (yellow card) 3× (suspension)	Report	2× (yellow card) 6× (suspension)	Dinamo Polyvalent Hall, Bucharest; Attendance: 800; Referees: Opava, Valek (CZE)

13 June 2019; 18:00	Lithuania	17–37	France	Švyturys Arena, Klaipėda; Attendance: 1,500; Referees: Leandersson, Lindroos (FIN)
13 June 2019; 18:00	G. Babarskas, Dumčius 5	(9–19)	Remili 8	Švyturys Arena, Klaipėda; Attendance: 1,500; Referees: Leandersson, Lindroos (FIN)
13 June 2019; 18:00	3× (yellow card) 6× (suspension)	Report	2× (yellow card) 5× (suspension)	Švyturys Arena, Klaipėda; Attendance: 1,500; Referees: Leandersson, Lindroos (FIN)

16 June 2019; 17:00	Portugal	28–28	Lithuania	Centro de Desportos e Congresso de Matosinhos, Matosinhos; Attendance: 3,525; Referees: Nikolov, Nachevski (MKD)
16 June 2019; 17:00	seven players 3	(16–13)	Dumčius 9	Centro de Desportos e Congresso de Matosinhos, Matosinhos; Attendance: 3,525; Referees: Nikolov, Nachevski (MKD)
16 June 2019; 17:00	2× (yellow card) 4× (suspension)	Report	2× (yellow card) 3× (suspension)	Centro de Desportos e Congresso de Matosinhos, Matosinhos; Attendance: 3,525; Referees: Nikolov, Nachevski (MKD)

16 June 2019; 18:00	France	34–25	Romania	Palais des Sports de Beaulieu, Nantes; Attendance: 5,422; Referees: Baranowski, Lemanowicz (POL)
16 June 2019; 18:00	Porte, Remili 6	(19–14)	Buzle, Mănescu 5	Palais des Sports de Beaulieu, Nantes; Attendance: 5,422; Referees: Baranowski, Lemanowicz (POL)
16 June 2019; 18:00	2× (yellow card) 1× (suspension)	Report	3× (yellow card) 3× (suspension)	Palais des Sports de Beaulieu, Nantes; Attendance: 5,422; Referees: Baranowski, Lemanowicz (POL)

=== Group 7 ===
Pos	Team	Pld	W	D	L	GF	GA	GD	Pts	Qualification
1	Hungary	6	5	1	0	161	135	+26	11	Final tournament
2	Russia	6	4	1	1	158	132	+26	9	Final tournament
3	Italy	6	2	0	4	146	172	−26	4	
4	Slovakia	6	0	0	6	129	155	−26	0	

Source: Eurohandball
Rules for classification: 1) points; 2) head-to-head points; 3) head-to-head goal difference; 4) head-to-head number of goals scored; 5) goal difference.

24 October 2018; 18:30	Hungary	30–22	Slovakia	Érd Aréna, Érd; Attendance: 2,000; Referees: Mažeika, Gatelis (LTU)
24 October 2018; 18:30	Bánhidi 6	(16–9)	Straňovský 7	Érd Aréna, Érd; Attendance: 2,000; Referees: Mažeika, Gatelis (LTU)
24 October 2018; 18:30	3× (yellow card) 4× (suspension)	Report	1× (yellow card) 3× (suspension)	Érd Aréna, Érd; Attendance: 2,000; Referees: Mažeika, Gatelis (LTU)

24 October 2018; 19:30	Russia	34–20	Italy	Alexander Gomelsky Universal Sports Hall CSKA, Moscow; Attendance: 1,500; Referees: Hájek, Macho (CZE)
24 October 2018; 19:30	Kiselev, Kuretkov 5	(18–7)	Parisini 5	Alexander Gomelsky Universal Sports Hall CSKA, Moscow; Attendance: 1,500; Referees: Hájek, Macho (CZE)
24 October 2018; 19:30	3× (yellow card) 2× (suspension)	Report	1× (yellow card) 2× (suspension)	Alexander Gomelsky Universal Sports Hall CSKA, Moscow; Attendance: 1,500; Referees: Hájek, Macho (CZE)

27 October 2018; 18:00	Slovakia	21–22	Russia	Tatran Handball Arena, Prešov; Attendance: 3,500; Referees: Nikolov, Nachevski (MKD)
27 October 2018; 18:00	Rábek 6	(12–10)	Shishkaryov 13	Tatran Handball Arena, Prešov; Attendance: 3,500; Referees: Nikolov, Nachevski (MKD)
27 October 2018; 18:00	3× (yellow card) 7× (suspension)	Report	3× (yellow card) 5× (suspension)	Tatran Handball Arena, Prešov; Attendance: 3,500; Referees: Nikolov, Nachevski (MKD)

27 October 2018; 19:00	Italy	22–30	Hungary	Kioene Arena, Padua; Attendance: 3,000; Referees: Harabagiu, Stănescu (ROU)
27 October 2018; 19:00	Parisini 5	(10–15)	Balogh, Hornyák 6	Kioene Arena, Padua; Attendance: 3,000; Referees: Harabagiu, Stănescu (ROU)
27 October 2018; 19:00	3× (yellow card) 2× (suspension)	Report	3× (yellow card) 2× (suspension)	Kioene Arena, Padua; Attendance: 3,000; Referees: Harabagiu, Stănescu (ROU)

10 April 2019; 18:45	Italy	26–23	Slovakia	Palasport Cattani, Faenza; Attendance: 4,000; Referees: Canbro, Kliko (SWE)
10 April 2019; 18:45	Sonnerer 7	(12–9)	J. Mikita 6	Palasport Cattani, Faenza; Attendance: 4,000; Referees: Canbro, Kliko (SWE)
10 April 2019; 18:45	3× (yellow card) 3× (suspension)	Report	3× (yellow card) 5× (suspension)	Palasport Cattani, Faenza; Attendance: 4,000; Referees: Canbro, Kliko (SWE)

11 April 2019; 17:30	Russia	19–25	Hungary	Sportcomplex Zvezdniy, Astrakhan; Attendance: 5,000; Referees: Leszczyński, Piechota (POL)
11 April 2019; 17:30	Dibirov 5	(10–15)	Balogh, Bánhidi 5	Sportcomplex Zvezdniy, Astrakhan; Attendance: 5,000; Referees: Leszczyński, Piechota (POL)
11 April 2019; 17:30	3× (yellow card) 1× (suspension)	Report	3× (yellow card) 4× (suspension)	Sportcomplex Zvezdniy, Astrakhan; Attendance: 5,000; Referees: Leszczyński, Piechota (POL)

14 April 2019; 16:00	Hungary	23–23	Russia	Érd Aréna, Érd; Attendance: 2,200; Referees: Gjeding, Hansen (DEN)
14 April 2019; 16:00	Lékai 6	(11–15)	Dibirov, Kalarash 6	Érd Aréna, Érd; Attendance: 2,200; Referees: Gjeding, Hansen (DEN)
14 April 2019; 16:00	3× (yellow card) 3× (suspension)	Report	3× (yellow card) 5× (suspension)	Érd Aréna, Érd; Attendance: 2,200; Referees: Gjeding, Hansen (DEN)

14 April 2019; 17:00	Slovakia	23–26	Italy	Sporting Hall MSK, Považská Bystrica; Attendance: 1,400; Referees: Pandžić, Šatordžija (BIH)
14 April 2019; 17:00	J. Mikita 7	(11–12)	Bulzamini, Parisini 5	Sporting Hall MSK, Považská Bystrica; Attendance: 1,400; Referees: Pandžić, Šatordžija (BIH)
14 April 2019; 17:00	3× (yellow card) 3× (suspension)	Report	4× (yellow card) 3× (suspension)	Sporting Hall MSK, Považská Bystrica; Attendance: 1,400; Referees: Pandžić, Šatordžija (BIH)

12 June 2019; 18:00	Slovakia	20–21	Hungary	Mestská športová hala, Šaľa; Attendance: 1,500; Referees: Bounouara, Sami (FRA)
12 June 2019; 18:00	Machác, Prokop 4	(8–9)	Ancsin, Máthé 4	Mestská športová hala, Šaľa; Attendance: 1,500; Referees: Bounouara, Sami (FRA)
12 June 2019; 18:00	2× (yellow card) 4× (suspension)	Report	1× (yellow card) 3× (suspension)	Mestská športová hala, Šaľa; Attendance: 1,500; Referees: Bounouara, Sami (FRA)

13 June 2019; 18:45	Italy	23–30	Russia	Pala Yamamay, Busto Arsizio; Attendance: 3,250; Referees: Argyridis, Mouttas (CYP)
13 June 2019; 18:45	Parisini 6	(10–14)	Kiselev 8	Pala Yamamay, Busto Arsizio; Attendance: 3,250; Referees: Argyridis, Mouttas (CYP)
13 June 2019; 18:45	2× (yellow card) 2× (suspension)	Report	2× (yellow card) 3× (suspension)	Pala Yamamay, Busto Arsizio; Attendance: 3,250; Referees: Argyridis, Mouttas (CYP)

16 June 2019; 18:00	Hungary	32–29	Italy	Messzi István Sportcsarnok, Kecskemét; Attendance: 1,900; Referees: Novikov, Rozhkov (UKR)
16 June 2019; 18:00	three players 5	(16–14)	Bulzamini, Sonnerer 7	Messzi István Sportcsarnok, Kecskemét; Attendance: 1,900; Referees: Novikov, Rozhkov (UKR)
16 June 2019; 18:00	1× (yellow card) 4× (suspension)	Report	2× (yellow card) 1× (suspension)	Messzi István Sportcsarnok, Kecskemét; Attendance: 1,900; Referees: Novikov, Rozhkov (UKR)

16 June 2019; 19:00	Russia	30–20	Slovakia	Sibur Arena, Saint Petersburg; Attendance: 3,500; Referees: Jović, Arnautović (BIH)
16 June 2019; 19:00	Soroka 5	(17–8)	Briatka 6	Sibur Arena, Saint Petersburg; Attendance: 3,500; Referees: Jović, Arnautović (BIH)
16 June 2019; 19:00	2× (yellow card) 2× (suspension)	Report	4× (yellow card) 2× (suspension)	Sibur Arena, Saint Petersburg; Attendance: 3,500; Referees: Jović, Arnautović (BIH)

=== Group 8 ===
Pos	Team	Pld	W	D	L	GF	GA	GD	Pts	Qualification
1	Denmark	6	5	0	1	197	153	+44	10	Final tournament
2	Montenegro	6	3	1	2	157	163	−6	7	Final tournament
3	Ukraine	6	3	0	3	161	159	+2	6	Final tournament
4	Faroe Islands	6	0	1	5	131	171	−40	1	

Source: Eurohandball
Rules for classification: 1) points; 2) head-to-head points; 3) head-to-head goal difference; 4) head-to-head number of goals scored; 5) goal difference.

24 October 2018; 17:30	Montenegro	24–24	Faroe Islands	Verde Complex, Podgorica; Attendance: 800; Referees: Bolic, Hurich (AUT)
24 October 2018; 17:30	Božović 5	(10–15)	Gunnarsson, Hansen 6	Verde Complex, Podgorica; Attendance: 800; Referees: Bolic, Hurich (AUT)
24 October 2018; 17:30	3× (yellow card) 4× (suspension)	Report	2× (yellow card) 3× (suspension)	Verde Complex, Podgorica; Attendance: 800; Referees: Bolic, Hurich (AUT)

24 October 2018; 21:00	Denmark	30–24	Ukraine	Ceres Park & Arena, Aarhus; Attendance: 3,677; Referees: Gubica, Milošević (CRO)
24 October 2018; 21:00	Markussen 5	(12–12)	Onufriyenko 5	Ceres Park & Arena, Aarhus; Attendance: 3,677; Referees: Gubica, Milošević (CRO)
24 October 2018; 21:00	3× (yellow card) 2× (suspension)	Report	1× (yellow card) 3× (suspension)	Ceres Park & Arena, Aarhus; Attendance: 3,677; Referees: Gubica, Milošević (CRO)

27 October 2018; 16:10	Faroe Islands	17–35	Denmark	Skjern Bank Arena, Skjern; Attendance: 2,178; Referees: Smailagic, Smailagic (SWE)
27 October 2018; 16:10	Selvig 4	(8–17)	M. Hansen 9	Skjern Bank Arena, Skjern; Attendance: 2,178; Referees: Smailagic, Smailagic (SWE)
27 October 2018; 16:10	3× (yellow card) 2× (suspension)	Report	1× (yellow card) 1× (suspension)	Skjern Bank Arena, Skjern; Attendance: 2,178; Referees: Smailagic, Smailagic (SWE)

28 October 2018; 17:30	Ukraine	29–24	Montenegro	Sport Manezh of Sumy State University, Sumy; Attendance: 1,430; Referees: Erdoğan, Özdeniz (TUR)
28 October 2018; 17:30	Ostroushko 7	(15–12)	Vujović 7	Sport Manezh of Sumy State University, Sumy; Attendance: 1,430; Referees: Erdoğan, Özdeniz (TUR)
28 October 2018; 17:30	1× (yellow card) 8× (suspension)	Report	2× (yellow card) 6× (suspension)	Sport Manezh of Sumy State University, Sumy; Attendance: 1,430; Referees: Erdoğan, Özdeniz (TUR)

10 April 2019; 18:00	Ukraine	30–19	Faroe Islands	Palace of Sports, Kyiv; Attendance: 3,300; Referees: Covalciuc, Covalciuc (MDA)
10 April 2019; 18:00	Onufriyenko 6	(17–12)	Gunnarsson, Selvig 5	Palace of Sports, Kyiv; Attendance: 3,300; Referees: Covalciuc, Covalciuc (MDA)
10 April 2019; 18:00	2× (yellow card) 4× (suspension)	Report	1× (yellow card) 3× (suspension)	Palace of Sports, Kyiv; Attendance: 3,300; Referees: Covalciuc, Covalciuc (MDA)

10 April 2019; 21:00	Montenegro	32–31	Denmark	Morača Sports Center, Podgorica; Attendance: 4,365; Referees: Pichon, Reveret (FRA)
10 April 2019; 21:00	Lasica 7	(16–17)	M. Hansen 8	Morača Sports Center, Podgorica; Attendance: 4,365; Referees: Pichon, Reveret (FRA)
10 April 2019; 21:00	3× (yellow card) 5× (suspension)	Report	2× (yellow card) 2× (suspension)	Morača Sports Center, Podgorica; Attendance: 4,365; Referees: Pichon, Reveret (FRA)

13 April 2019; 17:45	Faroe Islands	26–27	Ukraine	Royal Arena, Copenhagen; Attendance: 8,835; Referees: Tzaferopoulos, Bethmann (GRE)
13 April 2019; 17:45	Johansen 7	(14–15)	Ostroushko 9	Royal Arena, Copenhagen; Attendance: 8,835; Referees: Tzaferopoulos, Bethmann (GRE)
13 April 2019; 17:45	2× (yellow card) 2× (suspension)	Report	3× (yellow card) 1× (suspension)	Royal Arena, Copenhagen; Attendance: 8,835; Referees: Tzaferopoulos, Bethmann (GRE)

13 April 2019; 20:15	Denmark	37–26	Montenegro	Royal Arena, Copenhagen; Attendance: 11,835; Referees: Baumgart, Wild (GER)
13 April 2019; 20:15	Svan, Zachariassen 8	(14–11)	Lipovina, Vujović 6	Royal Arena, Copenhagen; Attendance: 11,835; Referees: Baumgart, Wild (GER)
13 April 2019; 20:15	3× (yellow card) 2× (suspension)	Report	1× (yellow card) 7× (suspension)	Royal Arena, Copenhagen; Attendance: 11,835; Referees: Baumgart, Wild (GER)

12 June 2019; 19:00	Ukraine	30–33	Denmark	Palace of Sports, Kyiv; Attendance: 3,800; Referees: Santos, Fonseca (POR)
12 June 2019; 19:00	Zhukov 6	(15–14)	M. Hansen, Schmidt 7	Palace of Sports, Kyiv; Attendance: 3,800; Referees: Santos, Fonseca (POR)
12 June 2019; 19:00	2× (yellow card) 4× (suspension)	Report	2× (yellow card) 4× (suspension)	Palace of Sports, Kyiv; Attendance: 3,800; Referees: Santos, Fonseca (POR)

13 June 2019; 19:30	Faroe Islands	21–24	Montenegro	Farum Arena, Farum; Attendance: 950; Referees: Mitrevski, Todorovski (MKD)
13 June 2019; 19:30	Gunnarsson 6	(9–11)	Vujović 11	Farum Arena, Farum; Attendance: 950; Referees: Mitrevski, Todorovski (MKD)
13 June 2019; 19:30	3× (yellow card) 8× (suspension) 1× (red card)	Report	2× (yellow card) 4× (suspension) 1× (red card)	Farum Arena, Farum; Attendance: 950; Referees: Mitrevski, Todorovski (MKD)

16 June 2019; 18:00	Denmark	31–24	Faroe Islands	Jutlander Bank Arena, Aalborg; Attendance: 4,591; Referees: Šniūrevičius, Grigalionis (LTU)
16 June 2019; 18:00	Andersson, Holm 7	(17–13)	Johansen 7	Jutlander Bank Arena, Aalborg; Attendance: 4,591; Referees: Šniūrevičius, Grigalionis (LTU)
16 June 2019; 18:00	2× (yellow card) 2× (suspension)	Report	2× (yellow card) 4× (suspension)	Jutlander Bank Arena, Aalborg; Attendance: 4,591; Referees: Šniūrevičius, Grigalionis (LTU)

16 June 2019; 18:00	Montenegro	27–21	Ukraine	Morača Sports Center, Podgorica; Attendance: 4,000; Referees: Bonifert, Oláh (HUN)
16 June 2019; 18:00	Čavor 5	(15–7)	Akimenko 6	Morača Sports Center, Podgorica; Attendance: 4,000; Referees: Bonifert, Oláh (HUN)
16 June 2019; 18:00	3× (yellow card) 3× (suspension)	Report	1× (yellow card) 6× (suspension)	Morača Sports Center, Podgorica; Attendance: 4,000; Referees: Bonifert, Oláh (HUN)

=== Ranking of third-placed teams ===
The four highest ranked third-placed teams from the groups directly qualify for the tournament. Matches against the fourth placed teams in each group will be discarded.

Pos	Grp	Team	Pld	W	D	L	GF	GA	GD	Pts	Qualification
1	5	Bosnia and Herzegovina	4	2	0	2	99	108	−9	4	Final tournament
2	2	Serbia	4	1	1	2	104	112	−8	3	Final tournament
3	4	Netherlands	4	1	0	3	99	107	−8	2	Final tournament
4	8	Ukraine	4	1	0	3	104	114	−10	2	Final tournament
5	1	Israel	4	1	0	3	94	127	−33	2	
6	6	Lithuania	4	0	1	3	95	131	−36	1	
7	3	Turkey	4	0	0	4	96	122	−26	0	
8	7	Italy	4	0	0	4	94	126	−32	0	

Source: Eurohandball
Rules for classification: 1) points; 2) goal difference; 3) number of goals scored.

=== Ranking of fourth-placed teams ===
The three lowest ranked fourth-placed teams not selected as hosts of 2022 European Men's Handball Championship will play in its Relegation round.

Pos	Grp	Team	Pld	W	D	L	GF	GA	GD	Pts	Promotion, qualification or relegation
1	3	Greece	6	1	1	4	145	168	−23	3	Qualification Phase 2
2	1	Kosovo	6	1	1	4	118	172	−54	3	Qualification Phase 2
3	6	Romania	6	1	0	5	129	157	−28	2	Qualification Phase 2
4	8	Faroe Islands	6	0	1	5	131	171	−40	1	Qualification Phase 2
5	2	Belgium	6	0	1	5	144	186	−42	1	Relegation Round
6	7	Slovakia	6	0	0	6	129	155	−26	0	Final tournament (co-host)
7	4	Estonia	6	0	0	6	142	185	−43	0	Relegation Round
8	5	Finland	6	0	0	6	131	185	−54	0	Relegation Round

Source: Eurohandball
Rules for classification: 1) points; 2) goal difference; 3) number of goals scored.

== EHF Euro Cup ==
For the first time ever, the EHF Euro Cup was played. The inaugural edition was between the 2020 co-hosts, Sweden, Austria and Norway, plus the champions of the 2018 Handball Euro, Spain. The first champions were Spain.

Pos	Team	Pld	W	D	L	GF	GA	GD	Pts
1	Spain (C)	6	5	0	1	186	170	+16	10
2	Norway	6	4	0	2	202	173	+29	8
3	Sweden	6	2	0	4	173	193	−20	4
4	Austria	6	1	0	5	182	207	−25	2

Source: EHF
Rules for classification: 1) points; 2) head-to-head points; 3) head-to-head goal difference; 4) head-to-head number of goals scored; 5) goal difference.
(C) Champions

24 October 2018; 18:15	Norway	43–31	Austria	Stjordalshallen, Stjordal; Attendance: 3,075; Referees: Boričić, Marković (SRB)
24 October 2018; 18:15	Sagosen 12	(18–10)	Hermann, Božović 6	Stjordalshallen, Stjordal; Attendance: 3,075; Referees: Boričić, Marković (SRB)
24 October 2018; 18:15	2× (yellow card) 3× (suspension)	Report	1× (yellow card) 4× (suspension)	Stjordalshallen, Stjordal; Attendance: 3,075; Referees: Boričić, Marković (SRB)

24 October 2018; 19:15	Sweden	28–29	Spain	Malmö Arena, Malmö; Attendance: 5,554; Referees: Bounouara, Sami (FRA)
24 October 2018; 19:15	Wanne 6	(12–15)	Solé 7	Malmö Arena, Malmö; Attendance: 5,554; Referees: Bounouara, Sami (FRA)
24 October 2018; 19:15	2× (yellow card) 3× (suspension)	Report	2× (yellow card) 6× (suspension)	Malmö Arena, Malmö; Attendance: 5,554; Referees: Bounouara, Sami (FRA)

28 October 2018; 16:30	Austria	31–34	Sweden	Raiffeisen Sportpark, Graz; Attendance: 3,000; Referees: Mandák, Rudinský (SVK)
28 October 2018; 16:30	Bozovic 8	(16–16)	Tollbring 7	Raiffeisen Sportpark, Graz; Attendance: 3,000; Referees: Mandák, Rudinský (SVK)
28 October 2018; 16:30	3× (yellow card) 1× (suspension)	Report	2× (yellow card) 4× (suspension)	Raiffeisen Sportpark, Graz; Attendance: 3,000; Referees: Mandák, Rudinský (SVK)

28 October 2018; 19:30	Spain	30–27	Norway	Polideportivo Huerta del Rey, Valladolid; Attendance: 2,900; Referees: Biró, Kiss (HUN)
28 October 2018; 19:30	A. Dujshebaev 6	(18–10)	Tangen 8	Polideportivo Huerta del Rey, Valladolid; Attendance: 2,900; Referees: Biró, Kiss (HUN)
28 October 2018; 19:30	2× (yellow card) 3× (suspension)	Report	1× (yellow card) 4× (suspension)	Polideportivo Huerta del Rey, Valladolid; Attendance: 2,900; Referees: Biró, Kiss (HUN)

11 April 2019; 18:20	Norway	35–26	Sweden	Sör Arena, Arendal; Attendance: 2,356; Referees: Cindrić, Gonzurek (CRO)
11 April 2019; 18:20	Jøndal 11	(15–16)	Gottfridsson 5	Sör Arena, Arendal; Attendance: 2,356; Referees: Cindrić, Gonzurek (CRO)
11 April 2019; 18:20	1× (yellow card) 1× (suspension)	Report	2× (yellow card) 1× (suspension)	Sör Arena, Arendal; Attendance: 2,356; Referees: Cindrić, Gonzurek (CRO)

11 April 2019; 20:25	Austria	29–28	Spain	Eishalle Messestadion, Dornbirn; Attendance: 3,600; Referees: Manea, Iliescu (ROU)
11 April 2019; 20:25	Weber 10	(14–11)	Figueras, Solé 5	Eishalle Messestadion, Dornbirn; Attendance: 3,600; Referees: Manea, Iliescu (ROU)
11 April 2019; 20:25	3× (yellow card) 1× (suspension)	Report	2× (yellow card) 3× (suspension)	Eishalle Messestadion, Dornbirn; Attendance: 3,600; Referees: Manea, Iliescu (ROU)

13 April 2019; 15:30	Sweden	27–33	Norway	Partille Arena, Partille; Attendance: 2,904; Referees: Mitrevski, Todorovski (MKD)
13 April 2019; 15:30	Chrintz 6	(11–21)	Gulliksen 7	Partille Arena, Partille; Attendance: 2,904; Referees: Mitrevski, Todorovski (MKD)
13 April 2019; 15:30	3× (yellow card) 3× (suspension)	Report	3× (yellow card) 6× (suspension)	Partille Arena, Partille; Attendance: 2,904; Referees: Mitrevski, Todorovski (MKD)

14 April 2019; 18:00	Spain	35–31	Austria	Pabellón Javier Imbroda Ortiz, Melilla; Attendance: 1,712; Referees: Martins, Martins (POR)
14 April 2019; 18:00	Balaguer 8	(18–15)	Pratschner 8	Pabellón Javier Imbroda Ortiz, Melilla; Attendance: 1,712; Referees: Martins, Martins (POR)
14 April 2019; 18:00	2× (yellow card) 4× (suspension)	Report	2× (yellow card) 4× (suspension)	Pabellón Javier Imbroda Ortiz, Melilla; Attendance: 1,712; Referees: Martins, Martins (POR)

12 June 2019; 21:00	Spain	33–25	Sweden	Mediterranean Sports Palace, Almería; Attendance: 4,100; Referees: Mertinian, Syrepisios (GRE)
12 June 2019; 21:00	Entrerríos, Figueras 6	(19–12)	Pettersson 7	Mediterranean Sports Palace, Almería; Attendance: 4,100; Referees: Mertinian, Syrepisios (GRE)
12 June 2019; 21:00	3× (yellow card) 2× (suspension)	Report	3× (yellow card) 1× (suspension)	Mediterranean Sports Palace, Almería; Attendance: 4,100; Referees: Mertinian, Syrepisios (GRE)

13 June 2019; 18:25	Austria	28–34	Norway	Sportpark Klagenfurt, Klagenfurt; Attendance: 1,100; Referees: Doychinov, Goretsov (BUL)
13 June 2019; 18:25	Wagner 6	(16–18)	Jøndal 6	Sportpark Klagenfurt, Klagenfurt; Attendance: 1,100; Referees: Doychinov, Goretsov (BUL)
13 June 2019; 18:25	2× (yellow card)	Report	1× (yellow card) 3× (suspension)	Sportpark Klagenfurt, Klagenfurt; Attendance: 1,100; Referees: Doychinov, Goretsov (BUL)

15 June 2019; 19:15	Norway	30–31	Spain	Bodo Spektrum, Bodø; Attendance: 2,163; Referees: Geraets, Geraets (NED)
15 June 2019; 19:15	Myrhol 10	(15–15)	Maqueda 7	Bodo Spektrum, Bodø; Attendance: 2,163; Referees: Geraets, Geraets (NED)
15 June 2019; 19:15	2× (yellow card) 2× (suspension)	Report	1× (yellow card) 1× (suspension)	Bodo Spektrum, Bodø; Attendance: 2,163; Referees: Geraets, Geraets (NED)

16 June 2019; 17:00	Sweden	33–32	Austria	Globe Arena, Stockholm; Attendance: 5,321; Referees: Ivanović, Vujisić (MNE)
16 June 2019; 17:00	Gottfridsson, Wanne 6	(18–15)	Bilyk 10	Globe Arena, Stockholm; Attendance: 5,321; Referees: Ivanović, Vujisić (MNE)
16 June 2019; 17:00	2× (yellow card) 2× (suspension)	Report	1× (yellow card) 3× (suspension)	Globe Arena, Stockholm; Attendance: 5,321; Referees: Ivanović, Vujisić (MNE)
