= 2020 European Men's Handball Championship =

14th edition of the European Men's Handball Championship

2020 EHF European Men's Handball Championship
Europamästerskapet i handboll för herrar 2020 (in Swedish) Handball-Europameisterschaft der Männer 2020 (in German) Håndball-EM 2020 for menn (in Norwegian)

Tournament details
- Host countries: Austria; Norway; Sweden
- Venues: 6 (in 6 host cities)
- Dates: 9–26 January
- Teams: 24 (from 1 confederation)

Final positions
- Champions: Spain (2nd title)
- Runners-up: Croatia
- Third place: Norway
- Fourth place: Slovenia

Tournament statistics
- Matches played: 65
- Goals scored: 3,532 (54.34 per match)
- Attendance: 492,628 (7,579 per match)
- Top scorers: (Norway) Sander Sagosen (65 goals)

Awards
- Best player: (Croatia) Domagoj Duvnjak

The 2020 EHF European Men's Handball Championship was the 14th edition of the tournament and the first to feature 24 national teams. It was co-hosted for the first time in three countries – Austria, Norway and Sweden – from 9 to 26 January 2020.

Spain won their second consecutive title by defeating Croatia 22–20 in the final, while co-hosts Norway won the bronze match against Slovenia. Other hosts Austria finished 8th and Sweden 7th.

Sander Sagosen's 65 goals was at the time a record for a single player at any European Championship, until Mathias Gidsel's 68 goals at the 2026 European Men's Handball Championship.

== Bidding process ==
The interested nations were as follows:

- Austria
- Norway
- Sweden

In December 2013, these were announced as the bids:

- Austria
- Norway
- Norway and Sweden
- Sweden

After further negotiations, between the three bids and the European Handball Federation, it was decided to merge the three individual bids into one big bid. Due to the decision to merge the bids, the EHF decided to bring forward the expansion of the tournament to 24 teams, which was originally going to start in 2022. On 20 September 2014, at the EHF Congress in Dublin, Austria, Norway and Sweden were all given the hosting rights.

== Venues ==
Stockholm, Sweden	Malmö, Sweden	Gothenburg, Sweden
Tele2 Arena; Capacity: 19,000	Malmö Arena; Capacity: 13,000	Scandinavium; Capacity: 12,000
2020 European Men's Handball Championship is located in Europe
Vienna, Austria	Graz, Austria	Trondheim, Norway
Wiener Stadthalle; Capacity: 12,000	Graz Messe Arena; Capacity: 6,000	Trondheim Spektrum; Capacity: 8,600

== Qualification ==
=== Qualified teams ===
Country	Qualified as	Qualified on	Previous appearances in tournament
Austria	Co-host	20 September 2014	3 (2010, 2014, 2018)
Norway	Co-host	20 September 2014	8 (2000, 2006, 2008, 2010, 2012, 2014, 2016, 2018)
Sweden	Co-host	20 September 2014	12 (**1994**, 1996, **1998**, **2000**, **2002**, 2004, 2008, 2010, 2012, 2014, 2016, 2018)
Spain	Defending champion	26 January 2018	13 (1994, 1996, 1998, 2000, 2002, 2004, 2006, 2008, 2010, 2012, 2014, 2016, **2018**)
Germany	Group 1 winner	13 April 2019	12 (1994, 1996, 1998, 2000, 2002, **2004**, 2006, 2008, 2010, 2012, **2016**, 2018)
Slovenia	Group 4 winner	14 April 2019	11 (1994, 1996, 2000, 2002, 2004, 2006, 2008, 2010, 2012, 2016, 2018)
Croatia	Group 2 winner	14 April 2019	13 (1994, 1996, 1998, 2000, 2002, 2004, 2006, 2008, 2010, 2012, 2014, 2016, 2018)
North Macedonia	Group 3 winner	12 June 2019	5 (1998, 2012, 2014, 2016, 2018)
Denmark	Group 8 winner	12 June 2019	12 (1994, 1996, 2000, 2002, 2004, 2006, **2008**, 2010, **2012**, 2014, 2016, 2018)
Hungary	Group 7 winner	12 June 2019	11 (1994, 1996, 1998, 2004, 2006, 2008, 2010, 2012, 2014, 2016, 2018)
Latvia	Group 4 runner-up	12 June 2019	0 (debut)
Portugal	Group 6 runner-up	13 June 2019	5 (1994, 2000, 2002, 2004, 2006)
France	Group 6 winner	13 June 2019	13 (1994, 1996, 1998, 2000, 2002, 2004, **2006**, 2008, **2010**, 2012, **2014**, 2016, 2018)
Russia	Group 7 runner-up	13 June 2019	12 (1994, **1996**, 1998, 2000, 2002, 2004, 2006, 2008, 2010, 2012, 2014, 2016)
Czech Republic	Group 5 winner	13 June 2019	9 (1996, 1998, 2002, 2004, 2008, 2010, 2012, 2014, 2018)
Belarus	Group 5 runner-up	13 June 2019	5 (1994, 2008, 2014, 2016, 2018)
Poland	Group 1 runner-up	16 June 2019	8 (2002, 2004, 2006, 2008, 2010, 2012, 2014, 2016)
Switzerland	Group 2 runner-up	16 June 2019	3 (2002, 2004, 2006)
Iceland	Group 3 runner-up	16 June 2019	10 (2000, 2002, 2004, 2006, 2008, 2010, 2012, 2014, 2016, 2018)
Montenegro	Group 8 runner-up	16 June 2019	4 (2008, 2014, 2016, 2018)
Bosnia and Herzegovina	Group 5 third place	16 June 2019	0 (debut)
Serbia	Group 2 third place	16 June 2019	5 (2010, 2012, 2014, 2016, 2018)
Netherlands	Group 4 third place	16 June 2019	0 (debut)
Ukraine	Group 8 third place	16 June 2019	5 (2000, 2002, 2004, 2006, 2010)

Note: Bold indicates champion for that year. Italic indicates host for that year.

== Marketing ==
The official anthem of the competition is "All for us", made and performed by Swedish DJ and producer Wahlstedt.

== Draw ==
The draw was held at the Erste Bank Campus in Vienna on 28 June 2019.

=== Seeding ===
The seedings were announced on 17 June 2019.

Pot 1	Pot 2	Pot 3	Pot 4
Spain; Sweden (assigned to F1); France; Denmark (assigned to E1); Croatia (assigned to A1); Czech Republic	Norway (assigned to D2); Slovenia; Germany (assigned to C2); North Macedonia; Hungary; Belarus	Austria (assigned to B3); Iceland; Montenegro; Portugal; Switzerland; Latvia	Poland; Russia; Serbia; Ukraine; Bosnia and Herzegovina; Netherlands

== Match officials ==
On 21 August 2019, 23 couples were announced. On 27 December 2019, EHF replaced the Serbian referee pair Nenad Nikolić and Dušan Stojković with the Latvian referee pair Zigmārs Sondors and Renārs Līcis, due to an injury and late recovery of Nikolić in late October.

Preliminary round
Country	Referees
Austria	Radojko Brkić; Andrej Jusufhodžić
Croatia	Dalibor Jurinović; Marko Mrvica
Denmark	Jesper Madsen; Henrik Mortensen
France	Charlotte Bonaventura; Julie Bonaventura
Germany	Robert Schulze; Tobias Tönnies
Iceland	Jónas Elíasson; Anton Pálsson
Norway	Lars Jørum; Håvard Kleven
Latvia	Zigmārs Sondors; Renārs Līcis
Slovakia	Michal Baďura; Jaroslav Ondogrecula
Slovenia	Bojan Lah; David Sok
Spain	Andreu Marín; Ignacio García

Preliminary and main round
Country	Referees
Czech Republic	Václav Horáček; Jiří Novotný
Lithuania	Vaidas Mažeika; Mindaugas Gatelis
Montenegro	Ivan Pavićević; Miloš Ražnatović
North Macedonia	Gjorgi Nachevski; Slave Nikolov
Portugal	Duarte Santos; Ricardo Fonseca
Sweden	Mirza Kurtagic; Mattias Wetterwik
Switzerland	Arthur Brunner; Morad Salah

Main round
Country	Referees
Croatia	Matija Gubica; Boris Milošević
Denmark	Martin Gjeding; Mads Hansen
France	Stevann Pichon; Laurent Reveret
Germany	Lars Geipel; Marcus Helbig
Spain	Óscar Raluy; Ángel Sabroso

== Preliminary round ==
All times are local (UTC+1).

=== Group A ===
Pos	Team	Pld	W	D	L	GF	GA	GD	Pts	Qualification
1	Croatia	3	3	0	0	82	65	+17	6	Main round
2	Belarus	3	2	0	1	94	88	+6	4	Main round
3	Montenegro	3	1	0	2	70	84	−14	2	
4	Serbia	3	0	0	3	72	81	−9	0	

Source: EHF
Rules for classification: 1) points; 2) head-to-head points; 3) head-to-head goal difference; 4) head-to-head number of goals scored; 5) goal difference.

9 January 2020; 18:15	Belarus	35–30	Serbia	Stadthalle Graz, Graz; Attendance: 3,806; Referees: Santos, Fonseca (POR)
9 January 2020; 18:15	Karalek 9	(16–15)	Radivojević 6	Stadthalle Graz, Graz; Attendance: 3,806; Referees: Santos, Fonseca (POR)
9 January 2020; 18:15	1× (yellow card) 9× (suspension)	Report	2× (yellow card) 3× (suspension)	Stadthalle Graz, Graz; Attendance: 3,806; Referees: Santos, Fonseca (POR)

9 January 2020; 20:30	Croatia	27–21	Montenegro	Stadthalle Graz, Graz; Attendance: 5,630; Referees: Brunner, Salah (SUI)
9 January 2020; 20:30	Cindrić 6	(12–13)	Grbović 6	Stadthalle Graz, Graz; Attendance: 5,630; Referees: Brunner, Salah (SUI)
9 January 2020; 20:30	2× (yellow card) 2× (suspension)	Report	3× (yellow card) 7× (suspension)	Stadthalle Graz, Graz; Attendance: 5,630; Referees: Brunner, Salah (SUI)

11 January 2020; 16:00	Croatia	31–23	Belarus	Stadthalle Graz, Graz; Attendance: 6,000; Referees: Bonaventura, Bonaventura (FRA)
11 January 2020; 16:00	Karačić 6	(15–10)	Vailupau 8	Stadthalle Graz, Graz; Attendance: 6,000; Referees: Bonaventura, Bonaventura (FRA)
11 January 2020; 16:00	4× (suspension)	Report	1× (yellow card) 5× (suspension)	Stadthalle Graz, Graz; Attendance: 6,000; Referees: Bonaventura, Bonaventura (FRA)

11 January 2020; 18:15	Montenegro	22–21	Serbia	Stadthalle Graz, Graz; Attendance: 5,500; Referees: Madsen, Mortensen (DEN)
11 January 2020; 18:15	Grbović 5	(11–10)	Kukić 6	Stadthalle Graz, Graz; Attendance: 5,500; Referees: Madsen, Mortensen (DEN)
11 January 2020; 18:15	2× (yellow card) 7× (suspension)	Report	1× (yellow card) 4× (suspension)	Stadthalle Graz, Graz; Attendance: 5,500; Referees: Madsen, Mortensen (DEN)

13 January 2020; 18:15	Montenegro	27–36	Belarus	Stadthalle Graz, Graz; Attendance: 5,000; Referees: Jørum, Kleven (NOR)
13 January 2020; 18:15	Lipovina 5	(11–17)	Vailupau 7	Stadthalle Graz, Graz; Attendance: 5,000; Referees: Jørum, Kleven (NOR)
13 January 2020; 18:15	1× (yellow card) 2× (suspension)	Report	1× (yellow card) 3× (suspension)	Stadthalle Graz, Graz; Attendance: 5,000; Referees: Jørum, Kleven (NOR)

13 January 2020; 20:30	Serbia	21–24	Croatia	Stadthalle Graz, Graz; Attendance: 6,500; Referees: Kurtagic, Wetterwik (SWE)
13 January 2020; 20:30	Kukić, Radivojević 4	(10–8)	Duvnjak, Stepančić 5	Stadthalle Graz, Graz; Attendance: 6,500; Referees: Kurtagic, Wetterwik (SWE)
13 January 2020; 20:30	4× (suspension) 1× (red card)	Report	2× (yellow card) 5× (suspension)	Stadthalle Graz, Graz; Attendance: 6,500; Referees: Kurtagic, Wetterwik (SWE)

=== Group B ===
Pos	Team	Pld	W	D	L	GF	GA	GD	Pts	Qualification
1	Austria (H)	3	3	0	0	98	87	+11	6	Main round
2	Czech Republic	3	2	0	1	79	76	+3	4	Main round
3	North Macedonia	3	1	0	2	79	84	−5	2	
4	Ukraine	3	0	0	3	74	83	−9	0	

Source: EHF
Rules for classification: 1) points; 2) head-to-head points; 3) head-to-head goal difference; 4) head-to-head number of goals scored; 5) goal difference.
(H) Hosts

10 January 2020; 18:15	Czech Republic	29–32	Austria	Wiener Stadthalle, Vienna; Attendance: 7,070; Referees: Elíasson, Pálsson (ISL)
10 January 2020; 18:15	Hrstka 6	(14–13)	Bilyk 12	Wiener Stadthalle, Vienna; Attendance: 7,070; Referees: Elíasson, Pálsson (ISL)
10 January 2020; 18:15	3× (suspension)	Report	1× (yellow card) 5× (suspension)	Wiener Stadthalle, Vienna; Attendance: 7,070; Referees: Elíasson, Pálsson (ISL)

10 January 2020; 20:30	North Macedonia	26–25	Ukraine	Wiener Stadthalle, Vienna; Attendance: 7,070; Referees: Jørum, Kleven (NOR)
10 January 2020; 20:30	Lazarov 8	(13–10)	Ostroushko 5	Wiener Stadthalle, Vienna; Attendance: 7,070; Referees: Jørum, Kleven (NOR)
10 January 2020; 20:30	1× (yellow card) 3× (suspension)	Report	1× (yellow card) 7× (suspension)	Wiener Stadthalle, Vienna; Attendance: 7,070; Referees: Jørum, Kleven (NOR)

12 January 2020; 16:00	Czech Republic	27–25	North Macedonia	Wiener Stadthalle, Vienna; Attendance: 6,642; Referees: Kurtagic, Wetterwik (SWE)
12 January 2020; 16:00	Kašpárek 7	(9–11)	Lazarov 11	Wiener Stadthalle, Vienna; Attendance: 6,642; Referees: Kurtagic, Wetterwik (SWE)
12 January 2020; 16:00	1× (yellow card) 6× (suspension)	Report	1× (yellow card) 3× (suspension)	Wiener Stadthalle, Vienna; Attendance: 6,642; Referees: Kurtagic, Wetterwik (SWE)

12 January 2020; 18:15	Austria	34–30	Ukraine	Wiener Stadthalle, Vienna; Attendance: 7,078; Referees: Bonaventura, Bonaventura (FRA)
12 January 2020; 18:15	Bilyk 10	(18–17)	Kozakevych 7	Wiener Stadthalle, Vienna; Attendance: 7,078; Referees: Bonaventura, Bonaventura (FRA)
12 January 2020; 18:15	1× (yellow card) 3× (suspension)	Report	4× (suspension)	Wiener Stadthalle, Vienna; Attendance: 7,078; Referees: Bonaventura, Bonaventura (FRA)

14 January 2020; 18:15	Austria	32–28	North Macedonia	Wiener Stadthalle, Vienna; Attendance: 7,623; Referees: Lah, Sok (SLO)
14 January 2020; 18:15	Weber 7	(18–12)	Stoilov 5	Wiener Stadthalle, Vienna; Attendance: 7,623; Referees: Lah, Sok (SLO)
14 January 2020; 18:15	2× (yellow card) 4× (suspension)	Report	3× (yellow card) 3× (suspension)	Wiener Stadthalle, Vienna; Attendance: 7,623; Referees: Lah, Sok (SLO)

14 January 2020; 20:30	Ukraine	19–23	Czech Republic	Wiener Stadthalle, Vienna; Attendance: 4,097; Referees: Santos, Fonseca (POR)
14 January 2020; 20:30	Kozakevych 4	(10–9)	Babák 6	Wiener Stadthalle, Vienna; Attendance: 4,097; Referees: Santos, Fonseca (POR)
14 January 2020; 20:30	1× (yellow card) 5× (suspension)	Report	1× (yellow card) 3× (suspension)	Wiener Stadthalle, Vienna; Attendance: 4,097; Referees: Santos, Fonseca (POR)

=== Group C ===
Pos	Team	Pld	W	D	L	GF	GA	GD	Pts	Qualification
1	Spain	3	3	0	0	102	73	+29	6	Main round
2	Germany	3	2	0	1	88	83	+5	4	Main round
3	Netherlands	3	1	0	2	80	94	−14	2	
4	Latvia	3	0	0	3	73	93	−20	0	

Source: EHF
Rules for classification: 1) points; 2) head-to-head points; 3) head-to-head goal difference; 4) head-to-head number of goals scored; 5) goal difference.

9 January 2020; 18:15	Germany	34–23	Netherlands	Trondheim Spektrum, Trondheim; Attendance: 4,057; Referees: Lah, Sok (SLO)
9 January 2020; 18:15	Häfner, Kohlbacher 5	(15–13)	Smits 7	Trondheim Spektrum, Trondheim; Attendance: 4,057; Referees: Lah, Sok (SLO)
9 January 2020; 18:15	2× (yellow card) 5× (suspension) 1× (red card)	Report	2× (yellow card) 4× (suspension)	Trondheim Spektrum, Trondheim; Attendance: 4,057; Referees: Lah, Sok (SLO)

9 January 2020; 20:30	Spain	33–22	Latvia	Trondheim Spektrum, Trondheim; Attendance: 4,524; Referees: Madsen, Mortensen (DEN)
9 January 2020; 20:30	Fernández Pérez 5	(14–11)	Krištopāns 7	Trondheim Spektrum, Trondheim; Attendance: 4,524; Referees: Madsen, Mortensen (DEN)
9 January 2020; 20:30	1× (yellow card) 2× (red card)	Report	1× (yellow card) 5× (suspension)	Trondheim Spektrum, Trondheim; Attendance: 4,524; Referees: Madsen, Mortensen (DEN)

11 January 2020; 16:00	Latvia	24–32	Netherlands	Trondheim Spektrum, Trondheim; Attendance: 5,942; Referees: Baďura, Ondogrecula (SVK)
11 January 2020; 16:00	Krištopāns 7	(10–16)	Smits 7	Trondheim Spektrum, Trondheim; Attendance: 5,942; Referees: Baďura, Ondogrecula (SVK)
11 January 2020; 16:00	1× (yellow card) 3× (suspension)	Report	1× (yellow card) 5× (suspension) 1× (red card)	Trondheim Spektrum, Trondheim; Attendance: 5,942; Referees: Baďura, Ondogrecula (SVK)

11 January 2020; 18:15	Spain	33–26	Germany	Trondheim Spektrum, Trondheim; Attendance: 6,558; Referees: Brunner, Salah (SUI)
11 January 2020; 18:15	A. Dujshebaev 7	(14–11)	Pekeler 5	Trondheim Spektrum, Trondheim; Attendance: 6,558; Referees: Brunner, Salah (SUI)
11 January 2020; 18:15	2× (yellow card) 4× (suspension)	Report	2× (yellow card) 4× (suspension)	Trondheim Spektrum, Trondheim; Attendance: 6,558; Referees: Brunner, Salah (SUI)

13 January 2020; 18:15	Latvia	27–28	Germany	Trondheim Spektrum, Trondheim; Attendance: 3,540; Referees: Elíasson, Pálsson (ISL)
13 January 2020; 18:15	Krištopāns 7	(11–16)	Kühn 8	Trondheim Spektrum, Trondheim; Attendance: 3,540; Referees: Elíasson, Pálsson (ISL)
13 January 2020; 18:15	1× (yellow card) 6× (suspension)	Report	2× (yellow card) 6× (suspension)	Trondheim Spektrum, Trondheim; Attendance: 3,540; Referees: Elíasson, Pálsson (ISL)

13 January 2020; 20:30	Netherlands	25–36	Spain	Trondheim Spektrum, Trondheim; Attendance: 3,809; Referees: Mažeika, Gatelis (LTU)
13 January 2020; 20:30	Smits 8	(13–17)	Maqueda 6	Trondheim Spektrum, Trondheim; Attendance: 3,809; Referees: Mažeika, Gatelis (LTU)
13 January 2020; 20:30	2× (yellow card) 8× (suspension)	Report	2× (yellow card) 2× (suspension)	Trondheim Spektrum, Trondheim; Attendance: 3,809; Referees: Mažeika, Gatelis (LTU)

=== Group D ===
Pos	Team	Pld	W	D	L	GF	GA	GD	Pts	Qualification
1	Norway (H)	3	3	0	0	94	80	+14	6	Main round
2	Portugal	3	2	0	1	83	83	0	4	Main round
3	France	3	1	0	2	82	79	+3	2	
4	Bosnia and Herzegovina	3	0	0	3	73	90	−17	0	

Source: EHF
Rules for classification: 1) points; 2) head-to-head points; 3) head-to-head goal difference; 4) head-to-head number of goals scored; 5) goal difference.
(H) Hosts

10 January 2020; 18:15	France	25–28	Portugal	Trondheim Spektrum, Trondheim; Attendance: 7,507; Referees: Sondors, Līcis (LAT)
10 January 2020; 18:15	Mem 5	(11–12)	Branquinho 5	Trondheim Spektrum, Trondheim; Attendance: 7,507; Referees: Sondors, Līcis (LAT)
10 January 2020; 18:15	2× (yellow card) 3× (suspension)	Report	1× (yellow card) 4× (suspension)	Trondheim Spektrum, Trondheim; Attendance: 7,507; Referees: Sondors, Līcis (LAT)

10 January 2020; 20:30	Norway	32–26	Bosnia and Herzegovina	Trondheim Spektrum, Trondheim; Attendance: 8,232; Referees: Schulze, Tönnies (GER)
10 January 2020; 20:30	Sagosen 12	(17–12)	Prce 7	Trondheim Spektrum, Trondheim; Attendance: 8,232; Referees: Schulze, Tönnies (GER)
10 January 2020; 20:30	1× (yellow card) 4× (suspension)	Report	1× (yellow card) 6× (suspension)	Trondheim Spektrum, Trondheim; Attendance: 8,232; Referees: Schulze, Tönnies (GER)

12 January 2020; 16:00	Portugal	27–24	Bosnia and Herzegovina	Trondheim Spektrum, Trondheim; Attendance: 7,936; Referees: Mažeika, Gatelis (LTU)
12 January 2020; 16:00	Portela 10	(12–11)	Prce 5	Trondheim Spektrum, Trondheim; Attendance: 7,936; Referees: Mažeika, Gatelis (LTU)
12 January 2020; 16:00	1× (yellow card) 3× (suspension)	Report	2× (yellow card) 4× (suspension)	Trondheim Spektrum, Trondheim; Attendance: 7,936; Referees: Mažeika, Gatelis (LTU)

12 January 2020; 18:15	France	26–28	Norway	Trondheim Spektrum, Trondheim; Attendance: 8,932; Referees: Horáček, Novotný (CZE)
12 January 2020; 18:15	Fabregas 8	(15–14)	Sagosen 10	Trondheim Spektrum, Trondheim; Attendance: 8,932; Referees: Horáček, Novotný (CZE)
12 January 2020; 18:15	1× (yellow card) 5× (suspension)	Report	3× (yellow card) 2× (suspension)	Trondheim Spektrum, Trondheim; Attendance: 8,932; Referees: Horáček, Novotný (CZE)

14 January 2020; 18:15	Bosnia and Herzegovina	23–31	France	Trondheim Spektrum, Trondheim; Attendance: 7,937; Referees: Jurinović, Mrvica (CRO)
14 January 2020; 18:15	Panić 9	(13–14)	Porte 7	Trondheim Spektrum, Trondheim; Attendance: 7,937; Referees: Jurinović, Mrvica (CRO)
14 January 2020; 18:15	4× (yellow card)	Report	2× (yellow card) 2× (suspension)	Trondheim Spektrum, Trondheim; Attendance: 7,937; Referees: Jurinović, Mrvica (CRO)

14 January 2020; 20:30	Portugal	28–34	Norway	Trondheim Spektrum, Trondheim; Attendance: 9,069; Referees: Baďura, Ondogrecula (SVK)
14 January 2020; 20:30	Areia 5	(14–16)	Jøndal 7	Trondheim Spektrum, Trondheim; Attendance: 9,069; Referees: Baďura, Ondogrecula (SVK)
14 January 2020; 20:30	2× (yellow card) 6× (suspension)	Report	3× (yellow card) 5× (suspension)	Trondheim Spektrum, Trondheim; Attendance: 9,069; Referees: Baďura, Ondogrecula (SVK)

=== Group E ===
Pos	Team	Pld	W	D	L	GF	GA	GD	Pts	Qualification
1	Hungary	3	2	1	0	74	67	+7	5	Main round
2	Iceland	3	2	0	1	83	77	+6	4	Main round
3	Denmark	3	1	1	1	85	83	+2	3	
4	Russia	3	0	0	3	76	91	−15	0	

Source: EHF
Rules for classification: 1) points; 2) head-to-head points; 3) head-to-head goal difference; 4) head-to-head number of goals scored; 5) goal difference.

11 January 2020; 16:00	Hungary	26–25	Russia	Malmö Arena, Malmö; Attendance: 9,202; Referees: Jurinović, Mrvica (CRO)
11 January 2020; 16:00	Balogh 7	(14–13)	Santalov 5	Malmö Arena, Malmö; Attendance: 9,202; Referees: Jurinović, Mrvica (CRO)
11 January 2020; 16:00	2× (yellow card) 3× (suspension)	Report	2× (yellow card)	Malmö Arena, Malmö; Attendance: 9,202; Referees: Jurinović, Mrvica (CRO)

11 January 2020; 18:15	Denmark	30–31	Iceland	Malmö Arena, Malmö; Attendance: 10,593; Referees: Pavićević, Ražnatović (MNE)
11 January 2020; 18:15	M. Hansen 9	(15–15)	Pálmarsson 10	Malmö Arena, Malmö; Attendance: 10,593; Referees: Pavićević, Ražnatović (MNE)
11 January 2020; 18:15	1× (yellow card) 3× (suspension) 1× (red card)	Report	2× (yellow card) 4× (suspension) 1× (red card)	Malmö Arena, Malmö; Attendance: 10,593; Referees: Pavićević, Ražnatović (MNE)

13 January 2020; 18:15	Iceland	34–23	Russia	Malmö Arena, Malmö; Attendance: 7,099; Referees: Nachevski, Nikolov (MKD)
13 January 2020; 18:15	three players 6	(18–11)	Kalarash 6	Malmö Arena, Malmö; Attendance: 7,099; Referees: Nachevski, Nikolov (MKD)
13 January 2020; 18:15	2× (yellow card) 4× (suspension)	Report	3× (yellow card) 4× (suspension)	Malmö Arena, Malmö; Attendance: 7,099; Referees: Nachevski, Nikolov (MKD)

13 January 2020; 20:30	Denmark	24–24	Hungary	Malmö Arena, Malmö; Attendance: 8,377; Referees: Sondors, Līcis (LAT)
13 January 2020; 20:30	Bramming 6	(11–13)	Balogh 7	Malmö Arena, Malmö; Attendance: 8,377; Referees: Sondors, Līcis (LAT)
13 January 2020; 20:30	3× (yellow card) 2× (suspension)	Report	3× (yellow card) 4× (suspension)	Malmö Arena, Malmö; Attendance: 8,377; Referees: Sondors, Līcis (LAT)

15 January 2020; 18:15	Iceland	18–24	Hungary	Malmö Arena, Malmö; Attendance: 7,587; Referees: Marín, García (ESP)
15 January 2020; 18:15	Pálmarsson, Sigurðsson 4	(12–9)	Bánhidi 8	Malmö Arena, Malmö; Attendance: 7,587; Referees: Marín, García (ESP)
15 January 2020; 18:15	1× (yellow card) 4× (suspension)	Report	2× (yellow card) 4× (suspension)	Malmö Arena, Malmö; Attendance: 7,587; Referees: Marín, García (ESP)

15 January 2020; 20:30	Russia	28–31	Denmark	Malmö Arena, Malmö; Attendance: 8,978; Referees: Brkić, Jusufhodžić (AUT)
15 January 2020; 20:30	Soroka 6	(15–12)	M. Hansen 7	Malmö Arena, Malmö; Attendance: 8,978; Referees: Brkić, Jusufhodžić (AUT)
15 January 2020; 20:30	3× (yellow card) 3× (suspension)	Report	1× (yellow card) 2× (suspension)	Malmö Arena, Malmö; Attendance: 8,978; Referees: Brkić, Jusufhodžić (AUT)

=== Group F ===
Pos	Team	Pld	W	D	L	GF	GA	GD	Pts	Qualification
1	Slovenia	3	3	0	0	76	67	+9	6	Main round
2	Sweden (H)	3	2	0	1	81	68	+13	4	Main round
3	Switzerland	3	1	0	2	77	87	−10	2	
4	Poland	3	0	0	3	73	85	−12	0	

Source: EHF
Rules for classification: 1) points; 2) head-to-head points; 3) head-to-head goal difference; 4) head-to-head number of goals scored; 5) goal difference.
(H) Hosts

10 January 2020; 18:15	Slovenia	26–23	Poland	Scandinavium, Gothenburg; Attendance: 7,276; Referees: Horáček, Novotný (CZE)
10 January 2020; 18:15	Blagotinšek, Mačkovšek 5	(13–11)	Moryto 8	Scandinavium, Gothenburg; Attendance: 7,276; Referees: Horáček, Novotný (CZE)
10 January 2020; 18:15	1× (yellow card) 5× (suspension)	Report	5× (suspension)	Scandinavium, Gothenburg; Attendance: 7,276; Referees: Horáček, Novotný (CZE)

10 January 2020; 20:30	Sweden	34–21	Switzerland	Scandinavium, Gothenburg; Attendance: 11,644; Referees: Marín, García (ESP)
10 January 2020; 20:30	three players 6	(20–13)	Schmid 4	Scandinavium, Gothenburg; Attendance: 11,644; Referees: Marín, García (ESP)
10 January 2020; 20:30	4× (suspension)	Report	1× (suspension)	Scandinavium, Gothenburg; Attendance: 11,644; Referees: Marín, García (ESP)

12 January 2020; 16:00	Switzerland	31–24	Poland	Scandinavium, Gothenburg; Attendance: 8,061; Referees: Brkić, Jusufhodžić (AUT)
12 January 2020; 16:00	Schmid 15	(14–12)	Sićko 5	Scandinavium, Gothenburg; Attendance: 8,061; Referees: Brkić, Jusufhodžić (AUT)
12 January 2020; 16:00	2× (yellow card) 5× (suspension)	Report	2× (yellow card) 4× (suspension)	Scandinavium, Gothenburg; Attendance: 8,061; Referees: Brkić, Jusufhodžić (AUT)

12 January 2020; 18:15	Sweden	19–21	Slovenia	Scandinavium, Gothenburg; Attendance: 11,896; Referees: Schulze, Tönnies (GER)
12 January 2020; 18:15	Gottfridsson 5	(9–10)	Dolenec 7	Scandinavium, Gothenburg; Attendance: 11,896; Referees: Schulze, Tönnies (GER)
12 January 2020; 18:15	1× (yellow card) 5× (suspension)	Report	2× (yellow card) 3× (suspension)	Scandinavium, Gothenburg; Attendance: 11,896; Referees: Schulze, Tönnies (GER)

14 January 2020; 18:15	Switzerland	25–29	Slovenia	Scandinavium, Gothenburg; Attendance: 6,731; Referees: Pavićević, Ražnatović (MNE)
14 January 2020; 18:15	Schmid 8	(10–16)	Zarabec 6	Scandinavium, Gothenburg; Attendance: 6,731; Referees: Pavićević, Ražnatović (MNE)
14 January 2020; 18:15	2× (yellow card) 3× (suspension)	Report	2× (yellow card) 2× (suspension)	Scandinavium, Gothenburg; Attendance: 6,731; Referees: Pavićević, Ražnatović (MNE)

14 January 2020; 20:30	Poland	26–28	Sweden	Scandinavium, Gothenburg; Attendance: 11,061; Referees: Nachevski, Nikolov (MKD)
14 January 2020; 20:30	Sićko 8	(13–14)	four players 5	Scandinavium, Gothenburg; Attendance: 11,061; Referees: Nachevski, Nikolov (MKD)
14 January 2020; 20:30	2× (yellow card) 3× (suspension)	Report	2× (yellow card) 3× (suspension)	Scandinavium, Gothenburg; Attendance: 11,061; Referees: Nachevski, Nikolov (MKD)

== Main round ==
Points and goals gained in the preliminary group against teams that advance were transferred to the main round.

=== Group I ===
Pos	Team	Pld	W	D	L	GF	GA	GD	Pts	Qualification
1	Spain	5	4	1	0	153	127	+26	9 (Note: Croatia 22–22 Spain)	Semi-finals
2	Croatia	5	4	1	0	127	113	+14	9	Semi-finals
3	Germany	5	3	0	2	141	125	+16	6	Fifth place game
4	Austria (H)	5	1	1	3	139	156	−17	3 (Note: Belarus 36–36 Austria)	
5	Belarus	5	1	1	3	138	160	−22	3	
6	Czech Republic	5	0	0	5	122	139	−17	0	

Source: EHF
Rules for classification: 1) points; 2) head-to-head points; 3) head-to-head goal difference; 4) head-to-head number of goals scored; 5) goal difference.
(H) Hosts
Notes:

16 January 2020; 16:00	Spain	31–25	Czech Republic	Wiener Stadthalle, Vienna; Attendance: 3,986; Referees: Brunner, Salah (SUI)
16 January 2020; 16:00	A. Dujshebaev, Fernández Pérez 5	(14–9)	Zdráhala 8	Wiener Stadthalle, Vienna; Attendance: 3,986; Referees: Brunner, Salah (SUI)
16 January 2020; 16:00	1× (yellow card) 4× (suspension)	Report	2× (yellow card) 6× (suspension)	Wiener Stadthalle, Vienna; Attendance: 3,986; Referees: Brunner, Salah (SUI)

16 January 2020; 18:15	Croatia	27–23	Austria	Wiener Stadthalle, Vienna; Attendance: 8,217; Referees: Pichon, Reveret (FRA)
16 January 2020; 18:15	Horvat 6	(13–8)	Weber 6	Wiener Stadthalle, Vienna; Attendance: 8,217; Referees: Pichon, Reveret (FRA)
16 January 2020; 18:15	1× (yellow card) 1× (suspension)	Report	1× (yellow card) 5× (suspension)	Wiener Stadthalle, Vienna; Attendance: 8,217; Referees: Pichon, Reveret (FRA)

16 January 2020; 20:30	Belarus	23–31	Germany	Wiener Stadthalle, Vienna; Attendance: 5,267; Referees: Kurtagic, Wetterwik (SWE)
16 January 2020; 20:30	Kulesh 6	(11–18)	Kastening 6	Wiener Stadthalle, Vienna; Attendance: 5,267; Referees: Kurtagic, Wetterwik (SWE)
16 January 2020; 20:30	1× (yellow card) 4× (suspension)	Report	1× (yellow card) 5× (suspension)	Wiener Stadthalle, Vienna; Attendance: 5,267; Referees: Kurtagic, Wetterwik (SWE)

18 January 2020; 16:00	Belarus	28–25	Czech Republic	Wiener Stadthalle, Vienna; Attendance: 6,007; Referees: Mažeika, Gatelis (LTU)
18 January 2020; 16:00	Vailupau 6	(13–11)	Zdráhala 7	Wiener Stadthalle, Vienna; Attendance: 6,007; Referees: Mažeika, Gatelis (LTU)
18 January 2020; 16:00	2× (yellow card) 5× (suspension)	Report	1× (yellow card) 6× (suspension)	Wiener Stadthalle, Vienna; Attendance: 6,007; Referees: Mažeika, Gatelis (LTU)

18 January 2020; 18:15	Spain	30–26	Austria	Wiener Stadthalle, Vienna; Attendance: 9,232; Referees: Gjeding, Hansen (DEN)
18 January 2020; 18:15	Maqueda 6	(17–16)	Božović 5	Wiener Stadthalle, Vienna; Attendance: 9,232; Referees: Gjeding, Hansen (DEN)
18 January 2020; 18:15	3× (suspension)	Report	1× (yellow card) 2× (suspension) 1× (red card)	Wiener Stadthalle, Vienna; Attendance: 9,232; Referees: Gjeding, Hansen (DEN)

18 January 2020; 20:30	Croatia	25–24	Germany	Wiener Stadthalle, Vienna; Attendance: 9,307; Referees: Santos, Fonseca (POR)
18 January 2020; 20:30	Karačić 7	(11–14)	four players 4	Wiener Stadthalle, Vienna; Attendance: 9,307; Referees: Santos, Fonseca (POR)
18 January 2020; 20:30	2× (yellow card) 4× (suspension)	Report	2× (yellow card) 8× (suspension)	Wiener Stadthalle, Vienna; Attendance: 9,307; Referees: Santos, Fonseca (POR)

20 January 2020; 16:00	Croatia	22–21	Czech Republic	Wiener Stadthalle, Vienna; Attendance: 6,862; Referees: Kurtagic, Wetterwik (SWE)
20 January 2020; 16:00	Mamić 5	(11–9)	Zdráhala 7	Wiener Stadthalle, Vienna; Attendance: 6,862; Referees: Kurtagic, Wetterwik (SWE)
20 January 2020; 16:00	1× (yellow card) 4× (suspension)	Report	1× (yellow card) 3× (suspension)	Wiener Stadthalle, Vienna; Attendance: 6,862; Referees: Kurtagic, Wetterwik (SWE)

20 January 2020; 18:15	Belarus	28–37	Spain	Wiener Stadthalle, Vienna; Attendance: 6,149; Referees: Santos, Fonseca (POR)
20 January 2020; 18:15	Vailupau 8	(16–17)	Fernández Pérez, Solé 7	Wiener Stadthalle, Vienna; Attendance: 6,149; Referees: Santos, Fonseca (POR)
20 January 2020; 18:15	1× (yellow card) 5× (suspension) 1× (red card)	Report	1× (yellow card) 3× (suspension)	Wiener Stadthalle, Vienna; Attendance: 6,149; Referees: Santos, Fonseca (POR)

20 January 2020; 20:30	Austria	22–34	Germany	Wiener Stadthalle, Vienna; Attendance: 9,037; Referees: Nachevski, Nikolov (MKD)
20 January 2020; 20:30	Bilyk 5	(13–16)	Kastening 6	Wiener Stadthalle, Vienna; Attendance: 9,037; Referees: Nachevski, Nikolov (MKD)
20 January 2020; 20:30	2× (yellow card) 4× (suspension)	Report	2× (yellow card) 2× (suspension)	Wiener Stadthalle, Vienna; Attendance: 9,037; Referees: Nachevski, Nikolov (MKD)

22 January 2020; 16:00	Croatia	22–22	Spain	Wiener Stadthalle, Vienna; Attendance: 7,891; Referees: Mažeika, Gatelis (LTU)
22 January 2020; 16:00	Karačić 10	(11–12)	A. Dujshebaev 6	Wiener Stadthalle, Vienna; Attendance: 7,891; Referees: Mažeika, Gatelis (LTU)
22 January 2020; 16:00	4× (yellow card) 4× (suspension)	Report	5× (suspension)	Wiener Stadthalle, Vienna; Attendance: 7,891; Referees: Mažeika, Gatelis (LTU)

22 January 2020; 18:15	Belarus	36–36	Austria	Wiener Stadthalle, Vienna; Attendance: 6,897; Referees: Brunner, Salah (SUI)
22 January 2020; 18:15	Vailupau 12	(19–17)	Bilyk 7	Wiener Stadthalle, Vienna; Attendance: 6,897; Referees: Brunner, Salah (SUI)
22 January 2020; 18:15	3× (yellow card) 3× (suspension)	Report	1× (yellow card) 4× (suspension)	Wiener Stadthalle, Vienna; Attendance: 6,897; Referees: Brunner, Salah (SUI)

22 January 2020; 20:30	Czech Republic	22–26	Germany	Wiener Stadthalle, Vienna; Attendance: 5,000; Referees: Pavićević, Ražnatović (MNE)
22 January 2020; 20:30	Babák 5	(10–13)	Weber 5	Wiener Stadthalle, Vienna; Attendance: 5,000; Referees: Pavićević, Ražnatović (MNE)
22 January 2020; 20:30	8× (suspension)	Report	1× (yellow card) 6× (suspension) 1× (red card)	Wiener Stadthalle, Vienna; Attendance: 5,000; Referees: Pavićević, Ražnatović (MNE)

=== Group II ===
Pos	Team	Pld	W	D	L	GF	GA	GD	Pts	Qualification
1	Norway (H)	5	5	0	0	157	135	+22	10	Semi-finals
2	Slovenia	5	3	0	2	138	132	+6	6	Semi-finals
3	Portugal	5	2	0	3	146	142	+4	4 (Note: Portugal 4 Pts, +18 GD; Sweden 2 Pts, −4 GD; Hungary 0 Pts, −14 GD)	Fifth place game
4	Sweden (H)	5	2	0	3	120	122	−2	4	
5	Hungary	5	2	0	3	126	140	−14	4	
6	Iceland	5	1	0	4	126	142	−16	2	

Source: EHF
Rules for classification: 1) points; 2) head-to-head points; 3) head-to-head goal difference; 4) head-to-head number of goals scored; 5) goal difference.
(H) Hosts
Notes:

17 January 2020; 16:00	Slovenia	30–27	Iceland	Malmö Arena, Malmö; Attendance: 6,026; Referees: Nachevski, Nikolov (MKD)
17 January 2020; 16:00	Bombač 9	(15–14)	Elísson 6	Malmö Arena, Malmö; Attendance: 6,026; Referees: Nachevski, Nikolov (MKD)
17 January 2020; 16:00	1× (yellow card) 4× (suspension)	Report	2× (yellow card) 4× (suspension)	Malmö Arena, Malmö; Attendance: 6,026; Referees: Nachevski, Nikolov (MKD)

17 January 2020; 18:15	Norway	36–29	Hungary	Malmö Arena, Malmö; Attendance: 8,078; Referees: Pavićević, Ražnatović (MNE)
17 January 2020; 18:15	Sagosen 7	(20–12)	Ligetvári, Nagy 5	Malmö Arena, Malmö; Attendance: 8,078; Referees: Pavićević, Ražnatović (MNE)
17 January 2020; 18:15	3× (yellow card) 4× (suspension)	Report	3× (yellow card) 4× (suspension) 1× (red card)	Malmö Arena, Malmö; Attendance: 8,078; Referees: Pavićević, Ražnatović (MNE)

17 January 2020; 20:30	Portugal	35–25	Sweden	Malmö Arena, Malmö; Attendance: 10,135; Referees: Gubica, Milošević (CRO)
17 January 2020; 20:30	three players 6	(15–12)	Nilsson, Pettersson 4	Malmö Arena, Malmö; Attendance: 10,135; Referees: Gubica, Milošević (CRO)
17 January 2020; 20:30	1× (yellow card) 5× (suspension)	Report	1× (yellow card) 2× (suspension)	Malmö Arena, Malmö; Attendance: 10,135; Referees: Gubica, Milošević (CRO)

19 January 2020; 14:00	Portugal	25–28	Iceland	Malmö Arena, Malmö; Attendance: 6,199; Referees: Horáček, Novotný (CZE)
19 January 2020; 14:00	Areia, Martins 4	(12–14)	Smárason 8	Malmö Arena, Malmö; Attendance: 6,199; Referees: Horáček, Novotný (CZE)
19 January 2020; 14:00	2× (yellow card) 4× (suspension)	Report	3× (yellow card) 4× (suspension)	Malmö Arena, Malmö; Attendance: 6,199; Referees: Horáček, Novotný (CZE)

19 January 2020; 16:15	Slovenia	28–29	Hungary	Malmö Arena, Malmö; Attendance: 8,304; Referees: Raluy, Sabroso (ESP)
19 January 2020; 16:15	Dolenec 8	(16–13)	Bánhidi 9	Malmö Arena, Malmö; Attendance: 8,304; Referees: Raluy, Sabroso (ESP)
19 January 2020; 16:15	2× (yellow card) 5× (suspension)	Report	2× (yellow card) 5× (suspension)	Malmö Arena, Malmö; Attendance: 8,304; Referees: Raluy, Sabroso (ESP)

19 January 2020; 18:30	Norway	23–20	Sweden	Malmö Arena, Malmö; Attendance: 10,141; Referees: Geipel, Helbig (GER)
19 January 2020; 18:30	Sagosen 8	(12–8)	Pellas 5	Malmö Arena, Malmö; Attendance: 10,141; Referees: Geipel, Helbig (GER)
19 January 2020; 18:30	2× (yellow card) 5× (suspension)	Report	2× (yellow card) 1× (suspension)	Malmö Arena, Malmö; Attendance: 10,141; Referees: Geipel, Helbig (GER)

21 January 2020; 16:00	Portugal	24–29	Slovenia	Malmö Arena, Malmö; Attendance: 3,001; Referees: Gjeding, Hansen (DEN)
21 January 2020; 16:00	Gomes 6	(15–14)	Janc 7	Malmö Arena, Malmö; Attendance: 3,001; Referees: Gjeding, Hansen (DEN)
21 January 2020; 16:00	1× (yellow card) 5× (suspension)	Report	2× (yellow card) 4× (suspension)	Malmö Arena, Malmö; Attendance: 3,001; Referees: Gjeding, Hansen (DEN)

21 January 2020; 18:15	Norway	31–28	Iceland	Malmö Arena, Malmö; Attendance: 4,725; Referees: Raluy, Sabroso (ESP)
21 January 2020; 18:15	Sagosen 9	(19–12)	Guðmundsson 6	Malmö Arena, Malmö; Attendance: 4,725; Referees: Raluy, Sabroso (ESP)
21 January 2020; 18:15	2× (yellow card) 6× (suspension)	Report	1× (yellow card) 4× (suspension)	Malmö Arena, Malmö; Attendance: 4,725; Referees: Raluy, Sabroso (ESP)

21 January 2020; 20:30	Hungary	18–24	Sweden	Malmö Arena, Malmö; Attendance: 6,977; Referees: Horáček, Novotný (CZE)
21 January 2020; 20:30	Szita 4	(9–10)	Gottfridsson, Pellas 5	Malmö Arena, Malmö; Attendance: 6,977; Referees: Horáček, Novotný (CZE)
21 January 2020; 20:30	3× (suspension)	Report	1× (yellow card)	Malmö Arena, Malmö; Attendance: 6,977; Referees: Horáček, Novotný (CZE)

22 January 2020; 16:00	Portugal	34–26	Hungary	Malmö Arena, Malmö; Attendance: 2,930; Referees: Geipel, Helbig (GER)
22 January 2020; 16:00	Moreira 7	(16–14)	Balogh, Bánhidi 5	Malmö Arena, Malmö; Attendance: 2,930; Referees: Geipel, Helbig (GER)
22 January 2020; 16:00	3× (yellow card) 3× (suspension)	Report	2× (yellow card) 2× (suspension)	Malmö Arena, Malmö; Attendance: 2,930; Referees: Geipel, Helbig (GER)

22 January 2020; 18:15	Norway	33–30	Slovenia	Malmö Arena, Malmö; Attendance: 4,824; Referees: Pichon, Reveret (FRA)
22 January 2020; 18:15	Gulliksen 7	(14–13)	Cehte, Kodrin 5	Malmö Arena, Malmö; Attendance: 4,824; Referees: Pichon, Reveret (FRA)
22 January 2020; 18:15	1× (yellow card) 3× (suspension)	Report	1× (yellow card) 3× (suspension)	Malmö Arena, Malmö; Attendance: 4,824; Referees: Pichon, Reveret (FRA)

22 January 2020; 20:30	Iceland	25–32	Sweden	Malmö Arena, Malmö; Attendance: 7,153; Referees: Gubica, Milošević (CRO)
22 January 2020; 20:30	Elísson, Kristjánsson 5	(11–18)	Nilsson 7	Malmö Arena, Malmö; Attendance: 7,153; Referees: Gubica, Milošević (CRO)
22 January 2020; 20:30	2× (yellow card)	Report	1× (yellow card) 4× (suspension)	Malmö Arena, Malmö; Attendance: 7,153; Referees: Gubica, Milošević (CRO)

== Knockout stage ==
=== Bracket ===
Semi-finals
24 January
Spain	34
Slovenia	32
24 January
Norway	28
Croatia (ET)	29

Final
26 January
Spain	22
Croatia	20
Third place
25 January
Slovenia	20
Norway	28

=== Semi-finals ===
24 January 2020
18:00
Norway
28–29 (ET)
Croatia
Tele2 Arena, Stockholm
Attendance: 16,573
Referees: Raluy, Sabroso (ESP)
Sagosen 10
(10–12)
Duvnjak 8
3× (yellow card) 4× (suspension)
Report
2× (yellow card) 6× (suspension)

FT: 23–23 ET: 3–3, 2–3

24 January 2020; 20:30	Spain	34–32	Slovenia	Tele2 Arena, Stockholm; Attendance: 16,573; Referees: Horáček, Novotný (CZE)
24 January 2020; 20:30	three players 6	(20–15)	Dolenec 7	Tele2 Arena, Stockholm; Attendance: 16,573; Referees: Horáček, Novotný (CZE)
24 January 2020; 20:30	3× (suspension)	Report	2× (yellow card) 4× (suspension)	Tele2 Arena, Stockholm; Attendance: 16,573; Referees: Horáček, Novotný (CZE)

=== Fifth place game ===
25 January 2020; 16:00	Germany	29–27	Portugal	Tele2 Arena, Stockholm; Attendance: 7,710; Referees: Kurtagic, Wetterwik (SWE)
25 January 2020; 16:00	Kühn 6	(14–13)	Borges, Ferraz 4	Tele2 Arena, Stockholm; Attendance: 7,710; Referees: Kurtagic, Wetterwik (SWE)
25 January 2020; 16:00	1× (yellow card) 3× (suspension)	Report	1× (yellow card) 4× (suspension)	Tele2 Arena, Stockholm; Attendance: 7,710; Referees: Kurtagic, Wetterwik (SWE)

=== Third place game ===
25 January 2020; 18:30	Slovenia	20–28	Norway	Tele2 Arena, Stockholm; Attendance: 13,094; Referees: Geipel, Helbig (GER)
25 January 2020; 18:30	Bombač 5	(9–12)	Jøndal 7	Tele2 Arena, Stockholm; Attendance: 13,094; Referees: Geipel, Helbig (GER)
25 January 2020; 18:30	3× (yellow card) 4× (suspension)	Report	1× (yellow card) 5× (suspension)	Tele2 Arena, Stockholm; Attendance: 13,094; Referees: Geipel, Helbig (GER)

=== Final ===
26 January 2020; 16:30	Spain	22–20	Croatia	Tele2 Arena, Stockholm; Attendance: 17,769; Referees: Nachevski, Nikolov (MKD)
26 January 2020; 16:30	Gómez 5	(12–11)	Duvnjak 5	Tele2 Arena, Stockholm; Attendance: 17,769; Referees: Nachevski, Nikolov (MKD)
26 January 2020; 16:30	2× (yellow card) 2× (suspension)	Report	2× (yellow card) 2× (suspension)	Tele2 Arena, Stockholm; Attendance: 17,769; Referees: Nachevski, Nikolov (MKD)

== Ranking and statistics ==
=== Final ranking ===
The teams ranked fourth in each group after the completion of the preliminary round matches were ranked 18 to 24, while teams ranked third in each group after the completion of the preliminary round matches were ranked 13 to 18 according to the number of points won in the preliminary round. Places seven or eight were attributed to the two teams ranked fourth in the groups, places nine and ten were attributed to the two teams ranked fifth in the groups, places eleven and twelve were attributed to the two teams ranked sixth in the group according to the number of points won by the respective teams after completion of the main round matches. Places one to six were decided by play–off or knock–out.

Rank	Team
1st place, gold medalist(s)	Spain
2nd place, silver medalist(s)	Croatia (Note: Qualified for the Olympic Qualification Tournament as one of the teams ranked 2nd through 7th at the 2019 World Men's Handball Championship)
3rd place, bronze medalist(s)	Norway
4	Slovenia
5	Germany
6	Portugal
7	Sweden
8	Austria
9	Hungary
10	Belarus
11	Iceland
12	Czech Republic
13	Denmark (Note: Qualified for the 2021 World Men's Handball Championship and the 2020 Summer Olympics as winners of the 2019 World Men's Handball Championship)
14	France
15	North Macedonia
16	Switzerland
17	Netherlands
18	Montenegro
19	Ukraine
20	Serbia
21	Poland
22	Russia
23	Bosnia and Herzegovina
24	Latvia

Team qualified for the 2021 World Men's Handball Championship and the 2020 Summer Olympics
Team qualified for the 2021 World Men's Handball Championship and the Olympic Qualification Tournament
Team qualified for the Olympic Qualification Tournament

2020 Men's European Champions

Spain
Second title

Team roster: Gonzalo Pérez de Vargas, Jorge Maqueda, Ángel Fernández Pérez, Raúl Entrerríos, Alex Dujshebaev, Daniel Sarmiento Melián, Rodrigo Corrales, Julen Aguinagalde, Ferran Solé, Iosu Goñi Leoz, Adrià Figueras, Joan Cañellas, Viran Morros, Aleix Gómez, Aitor Ariño, Gedeón Guardiola, Daniel Dujshebaev.
Head coach: Jordi Ribera.

=== All-Star Team ===
The all-star team and awards were announced on 26 January 2020.

Position	Player
Goalkeeper	Gonzalo Pérez de Vargas (ESP)
Right wing	Blaž Janc (SLO)
Right back	Jorge Maqueda (ESP)
Centre back	Igor Karačić (CRO)
Left back	Sander Sagosen (NOR)
Left wing	Magnus Jøndal (NOR)
Pivot	Bence Bánhidi (HUN)

=== Awards ===
Award	Player
Most Valuable Player	Domagoj Duvnjak (CRO)
Best Defence Player	Hendrik Pekeler (GER)
Topscorer	Sander Sagosen (NOR) (65 goals)

=== Statistics ===
==== Top goalscorers ====
Rank	Name	Goals	Shots	%
1	(Norway) Sander Sagosen	65	104	63
2	(Belarus) Mikita Vailupau	47	63	75
3	(Austria) Nikola Bilyk	46	64	72
4	(Slovenia) Jure Dolenec	42	66	64
5	(Spain) Alex Dujshebaev	37	59	63
5	(Belarus) Artsem Karalek	37	50	74
5	(Czech Republic) Ondřej Zdráhala	37	59	63
8	(Croatia) Domagoj Duvnjak	36	54	67
8	(Norway) Magnus Jøndal	36	50	72
10	(Austria) Robert Weber	35	48	73

Source: Sportresult

==== Top goalkeepers ====
Rank	Name	%	Saves	Shots
1	(Bosnia and Herzegovina) Nebojša Grahovac	40	12	30
2	(Germany) Johannes Bitter	35	43	123
2	(Denmark) Niklas Landin Jacobsen	35	34	98
4	(Norway) Torbjørn Bergerud	34	90	265
4	(Sweden) Andreas Palicka	34	44	128
6	(Sweden) Mikael Appelgren	33	39	117
6	(Spain) Gonzalo Pérez de Vargas	33	66	199
8	(Spain) Rodrigo Corrales	32	41	130
8	(Slovenia) Klemen Ferlin	32	86	272
10	(France) Vincent Gérard	31	24	77
10	(Poland) Adam Morawski	31	26	83
10	(Portugal) Alfredo Quintana	31	84	271
10	(Montenegro) Nebojša Simić	31	32	103

Source: Sportresult
