= António Areia =

Portuguese handball player (born 1990)

Personal information
- Full name: António Antunes Baeta Rodrigues Areia
- Nationality: Portuguese
- Born: 21 June 1990 (age 36) Lisbon, Portugal
- Height: 1.90 m (6 ft 3 in)

Sport
- Sport: Handball
- Position: Right wing
- Current club: FC Porto
- Number: 25

Senior clubs
- Years: Team
- 2008–2010: Belenenses
- 2010–2015: S.L. Benfica
- 2015–2024: FC Porto
- 2024–: Tremblay Handball
National team
Years	Team	Apps	(Gls)
–	Portugal	112	(334)
- Updated on 14 January 2026

António Antunes Baeta Rodrigues Areia (pronounced [ɐ̋ˈtonju ɐˈɾɐjɐ]; born 21 June 1990) is a Portuguese handball player for FC Porto and the Portuguese national team.

He represented Portugal at the 2020 European Men's Handball Championship. In 2025 he was part of the Portugal team that reached the semifinals of the World Championship for the first time in history. They lost the semifinals to Denmark and the third place playoff to France. In the last seconds of the match he missed the shot, that would put Portugal level and take the match to extra time. At the 2026 European Men's Handball Championship he was part of the Portugal team that got 5th place, their best ever finish at a European Championship.
