= Jorge Maqueda =

Spanish handball player (born 1988)

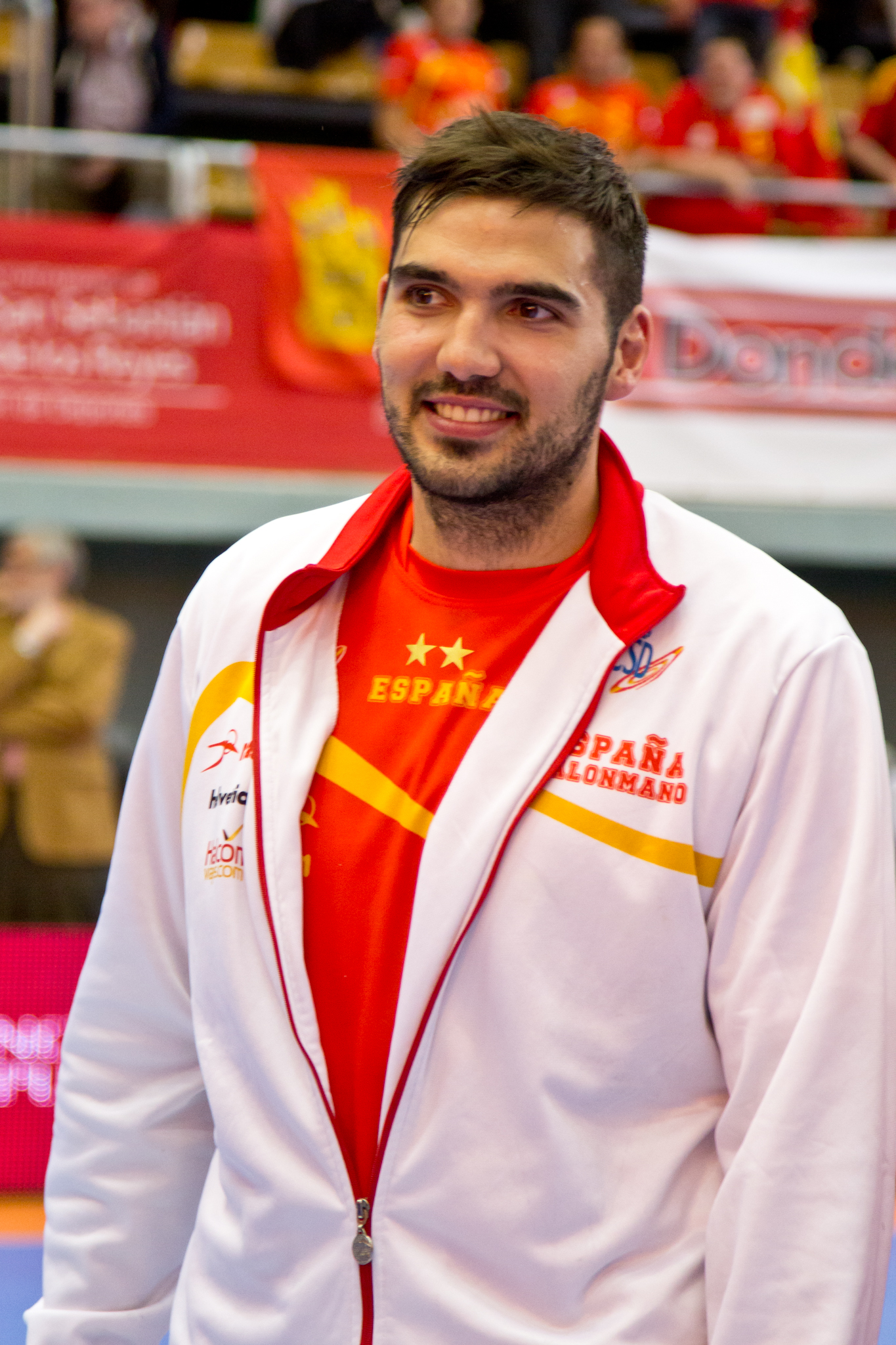
- Maqueda in 2013

Personal information
- Full name: Jorge Maqueda Peño
- Born: 6 February 1988 (age 38) Toledo, Spain
- Height: 1.97 m (6 ft 6 in)

Sport
- Sport: Handball
- Position: Right back
- Current club: Industria Kielce
- Number: 15

Senior clubs
- Years: Team
- 2005–2007: FC Barcelona
- 2007–2009: BM Alcobendas
- 2009–2012: BM Aragón
- 2012–2015: HBC Nantes
- 2015–2018: RK Vardar
- 2018–2020: SC Pick Szeged
- 2020–2022: Telekom Veszprém
- 2022–2024: HBC Nantes
- 2024–: Industria Kielce
National team
| Years | Team | Apps | (Gls) |
| 2010–2024 | Spain | 213 | (512) |
Medal record
Olympic Games
| Bronze medal – third place | 2020 Tokyo | Team |
| Bronze medal – third place | 2024 Paris | Team |
World Championship
| Gold medal – first place | 2013 Spain |
| Bronze medal – third place | 2011 Sweden |
| Bronze medal – third place | 2021 Egypt |
| Bronze medal – third place | 2023 Poland/Sweden |
European Championship
| Gold medal – first place | 2020 Sweden/Austria/Norway |
| Silver medal – second place | 2016 Poland |
| Silver medal – second place | 2022 Hungary/Slovakia |
| Bronze medal – third place | 2014 Denmark |
- Updated on 2024

Jorge Maqueda Peño (born 6 February 1988) is a Spanish handball player for Industria Kielce. He was on the Spanish team that won the 2013 World Championship.

== Career ==
Maqueda's first professional club was FC Barcelona, where he played from 2005 to 2007. In 2009 he joined BM Aragón, where he played until 2012. He then joined French team HBC Nantes. In 2015 he joined Macedonian team RK Vardar Skopje. Here he won the 2016 and 2017 North Macedonian cup and league double. He also won the 2016-17 EHF Champions League with the club.

In 2018 he joined Hungarian team Pick Szeged. Here he won the 2019 Hungarian Cup. In 2020 he joined league rivals KC Veszprém. With Veszprém he won the 2021 and 2022 Hungarian cup and the 2021 SEHA League.

In 2022 he returned to French handball and HBC Nantes. Here he won the Trophée des Champions in the 2022-23 season and the Coupe de France in the 2022-23 and 2023-24 season.

In 2024 he joined Polish team KS Kielce.

=== National team ===
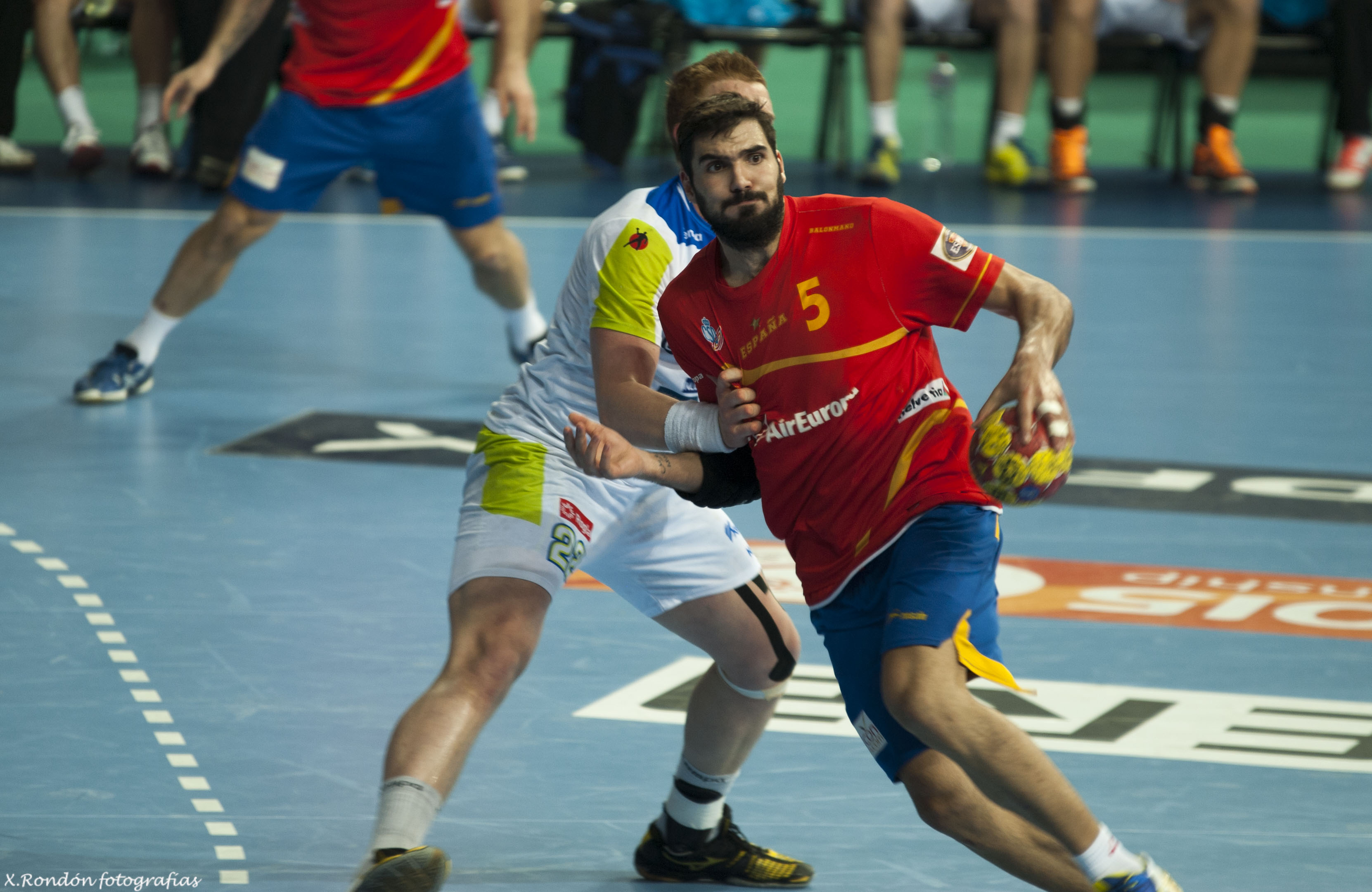
Jorge Maqueda at the 2013 World Championship

Maqueda played 47 games for the Spanish youth national teams, scoring 222 goals and 47 games for the Junior national team, scoring 165 gaols.

He debuted for the Spanish national team on 15 June 2007. His first major international tournament was the 2011 World Championship.

He competed for Spain in the 2012 Summer Olympics, where Spain finished 7th. and the 2020 Summer Olympics.

== Honours and awards ==
=== Vardar Skopje ===
- EHF Champions League Winner: 2016–17
- Macedonian Handball Super League: 2015–16, 2016–17, 2017–18
- Macedonian Handball Cup: 2016, 2017, 2018

=== MOL-Pick Szeged ===
- Magyar Kézilabdakupa: 2018–2019

=== Individual ===
- SEHA League All-Star Team Best Right Back: 2019–20
