= 2024 European Men's Handball Championship bidding process =

The 2024 European Men's Handball Championship bidding process entails the bids for the 2024 European Men's Handball Championship. The winners were Germany.

== Bidding timeline ==
The bidding timeline is as follows:

- 1 May 2017: Bidding nations to provide official expression of interest in the hosting of the tournament
- 1 July 2017: Bidding manuals sent to all bidding federations
- 1 November 2017: Deadline for completed bidding and application documentation to be provided to the EHF office
- 15 December 2017: Applications to be approved at the EHF executive committee in Hamburg
- 20 June 2018: Appointment of host(s) of EHF Euro 2024 at the 14th ordinary EHF Congress in Glasgow, Scotland

== Bids ==
On 4 May 2017, it was announced that the following countries had sent in an official expression of interest:

- Czech Republic, Hungary & Slovakia
- Denmark & Switzerland
- Germany
- (North Macedonia) Macedonia (potentially with Slovenia)
- Lithuania

However, when the deadline for submitting the final bids expired, the following applications had been received:

- Denmark & Switzerland
- Hungary & Slovakia (withdrew after receiving the 2022 hosting rights)
- Germany

=== Denmark and Switzerland ===
Denmark arena map
Switzerland arena map

Denmark and Switzerland decided to bid together, under the slogan Perfect Partnership. They were originally going to bid alongside Germany for 2022, but the Germans decided to shift away from the project to focus on a solo bid for 2024. Their project was designed to show small nations can host big tournaments sustainably. The bid had full backing from the Danish and Swiss governments. In June 2018, Denmark and Switzerland both played a friendly to further promote their bid. The chairman of the Danish federation, Per Bertelsen, said the bid had a good chance of winning.

The main rounds would be in Zürich and Herning, while the final weekend would be in Herning.

Proposed venues
(Denmark) Herning	(Denmark) Copenhagen
Jyske Bank Boxen	Royal Arena
Capacity: 15,000	Capacity: 13,000
(Denmark) Aarhus	(Switzerland) Zürich
Ceres Arena	Hallenstadion
Capacity: 5,000	Capacity: 11,200

=== Germany ===
After stepping away from the bid with the Danes and Swiss a week before the deadline, the Germans formed a solo bid for 2024. Great sport, great engagement” is the slogan. In January 2018, EHF president, Michael Wiederer confessed that a he supported a possible European Championship in Germany.

The opening game will be held in Esprit Arena in Düsseldorf and is aiming to break the world record for number of spectators during a handball game and the final weekend will be held at the Lanxess Arena in Cologne.

These are the proposed venues:

Düsseldorf	Cologne	Berlin
Esprit Arena	Lanxess Arena	Mercedes-Benz Arena
Capacity: 50,000	Capacity: 19,603	Capacity: 14,800
Hamburg	2024 European Men's Handball Championship bidding process is located in Germany	
Barclaycard Arena	2024 European Men's Handball Championship bidding process is located in Germany	
Capacity: 13 300	2024 European Men's Handball Championship bidding process is located in Germany	
Mannheim	2024 European Men's Handball Championship bidding process is located in Germany	
SAP Arena	2024 European Men's Handball Championship bidding process is located in Germany	
Capacity: 13 200	2024 European Men's Handball Championship bidding process is located in Germany	
Munich	Hanover	
Olympiahalle	TUI Arena	
Capacity: 12,500	Capacity: 10,000	

== Withdrawn bids ==
=== Hungary and Slovakia ===
Hungary arena map
Slovakia arena map

Hungary and Slovakia both submitted a joint application for the event. The slogan is Watch games see more, which is meant to reference the short distances between venues. The bid had government support from both sides.

The main round would be in Bratislava and Budapest, while the final weekend would be held at the new Budapest Arena.

They withdrew shortly before the vote because they had won the hosting rights for the 2022 European Men's Handball Championship.

Proposed venues
(Hungary) Budapest	(Hungary) Veszprém	(Slovakia) Bratislava
MVM Dome	Veszprém Aréna	Ondrej Nepela Arena
Capacity: 20,022	Capacity: 8,469	Capacity: 10,000
(Hungary) Szeged	(Hungary) Debrecen	(Slovakia) Košice
Pick Aréna	Főnix Arena	Steel Aréna
Capacity: 8,143	Capacity: 6,500	Capacity: 7,900

== Host selection ==
On 20 June 2018 at the 14th ordinary EHF Congress held in Glasgow, Germany was selected to host the competition.

Voting results
Country
Country	Votes
Germany	27
Denmark & Switzerland	19
Hungary & Slovakia	-
Total	46
