= 2022 European Men's Handball Championship bidding process =

The 2022 European Men's Handball Championship bidding process entails the bids for the 2022 European Men's Handball Championship. The winners were Hungary and Slovakia.

== Bidding timeline ==
The bidding timeline was as follows:

- 1 May 2017: Bidding nations to provide official expression of interest in the hosting of the tournament
- 1 July 2017: Bidding manuals sent to all bidding federations
- 1 November 2017: Deadline for completed bidding and application documentation to be provided to the EHF office
- 15 December 2017: Applications to be approved at the EHF executive committee in Hamburg
- 20 June 2018: appointment of host(s) of EHF Euro 2022 at the 14th ordinary EHF Congress in Glasgow, Scotland

== Bids ==
On 4 May 2017 it was announced that the following nations had sent in an official expression of interest:

- Belgium, Spain & France
- Czech Republic, Hungary & Slovakia
- Denmark, Germany & Switzerland
- (North Macedonia) Macedonia (potentially with Slovenia)
- Russia & Belarus
- Lithuania

However, when the deadline for submitting the final bids was over, the following applications had been received:

- Belgium, Spain & France
- Denmark & Switzerland (withdrew shortly before the vote)
- Hungary & Slovakia

=== Belgium, France and Spain ===
Belgium arena map
France arena map
Spain arena map

On 18 November 2016, news broke out of a possible joint bid between Belgium, France and Spain. All three parties had a meeting about the bid in Brussels, Belgium. Their bid was one of the three bids hoping to win the 2022 hosting rights. Their slogan is Relay. On 1 November 2017, they officially confirmed their proposed cities and venues.

The preliminary round groups would take place in Antwerp, Montpellier, Nantes, Strasbourg, Madrid (who replaced León as a host city due to them not meeting all the requirements) and Santander. The venue in Antwerp was considered too small but was given an exception due to Belgium being a smaller handball nation. The main round would be in Nantes and Bilbao, with the final weekend in Paris.

Proposed venues
(France) Paris	(Spain) Madrid
AccorHotels Arena	WiZink Center
Capacity: 15,800	Capacity: 12,500
(France) Nantes	(Spain) Bilbao
Hall XXL	Palacio des Deportes
Capacity: 10,000	Capacity: 8,500
(France) Montpellier	(France) Strasbourg
Sud de France Arena	Rhénus Sport
Capacity: 8,276	Capacity: 8,000
(Spain) Santander	(Belgium) Antwerp
Palacio de Deportes de Santander	Lotto Arena
Capacity: 5,400	Capacity: 5,000

=== Hungary and Slovakia ===
Hungary arena map
Slovakia arena map

Hungary and Slovakia both submitted a joint application for the event. The slogan is Watch games see more, which is meant to reference the short distances between venues. The bid had government support from both sides.

The main round would be in Bratislava and Budapest, while the final weekend would be held at the new Budapest Arena.

Proposed venues
(Hungary) Budapest	(Hungary) Veszprém	(Slovakia) Bratislava
MVM Dome	Veszprém Aréna	Ondrej Nepela Arena
Capacity: 20,022	Capacity: 8,469	Capacity: 10,000
(Hungary) Szeged	(Hungary) Debrecen	(Slovakia) Košice
Pick Aréna	Főnix Arena	Steel Aréna
Capacity: 8,143	Capacity: 6,500	Capacity: 7,900

== Withdrawn bids ==
=== Denmark and Switzerland ===
Denmark arena map
Switzerland arena map

Denmark and Switzerland decided to bid together, under the slogan Perfect Partnership. They were originally going to bid alongside Germany for 2022, but the Germans decided to shift away from the project to focus on a solo bid for 2024. Their project was designed to show small nations can host big tournaments sustainably. The bid had full backing from the Danish and Swiss governments. In June 2018, Denmark and Switzerland both played a friendly to further promote their bid. The chairman of the Danish federation, Per Bertelsen, said the bid had a good chance of winning.

The main rounds would be in Zürich and Herning, while the final weekend would be in Herning.

However, shortly before the vote, they withdrew their bid for 2022 for unknown reasons.

Proposed venues
(Denmark) Herning	(Denmark) Copenhagen
Jyske Bank Boxen	Royal Arena
Capacity: 15,000	Capacity: 13,000
(Denmark) Aarhus	(Switzerland) Zürich
Ceres Arena	Hallenstadion
Capacity: 5,000	Capacity: 11,200

=== Belarus and Russia ===
In late 2016, Belarus and Russia was reported to have a meeting together talking about a possible bid. Potential hosts cities consisted of Brest, Gomel and Minsk from Belarus, and Moscow and Saint Petersburg from Russia. However, this bid never materialised.

== Host selection ==
On 20 June at the 14th ordinary EHF Congress held in Glasgow, Hungary and Slovakia were selected to host the competition.

Voting results
Country
Country	Votes
Hungary & Slovakia	32
Belgium, Spain & France	14
Denmark & Switzerland	–
Total	46
