= List of concerts at NDK, Sofia =

The National Palace of Culture (short NDK) is one of the major music venues in Sofia, Bulgaria. The main Hall 1 with its more than 3500 comfortable seats has hosted many famous performers and hit spectacles.

Below is a list of some of the events that have been held there.

== Hall 1 ==
=== Rock, pop and jazz performers ===
==== Bands ====
Year	Date	Band	Tour
1998	December 6	Uriah Heep & Nazareth	Sonic Origami and Boogaloo albums support
1999	March 19	Electric Light Orchestra II (ELO)	
1999	June 25	Apocalyptica	Inquisition Symphony album support
2000	August 15	Toto	Mindfields Tour
2002	June 11	B.T.R. with guest performer Glenn Hughes	The Game album support
2002	July 3	Dream Theater	World Tourbulence Tour
2002	July 13	The Manhattan Transfer	The Spirit of St. Louis album support
2002	August 13	Smokie	
2003	September 12	Placebo	Sleeping with Ghosts album support
2003	October 11	Moloko	Statues album support
2004	May 29	Jethro Tull	The Jethro Tull Christmas Album support
2006	September 18	Level 42	Retroglide album support
2006	September 23	Chambao	
2006	October 24	Lubeh	
2006	November 13	Earth, Wind & Fire	Illumination album support
2007	April 17	Blackmore's Night	The Village Lanterne album support
2008	June 23	Kansas	Playlist: The Very Best of Kansas album support
2008	October 3	Thin Lizzy	
2008	December 4	Signal	anniversary show
2008	December 12	Shturcite	
2009	March 22	Asia	Phoenix album support
2010	March 10	Mashina Vremeni	
2010	December 13	FSB	
2011	May 14	Omega	
2011	June 20	Kansas	
2012	October 18	Status Quo	

==== Solo artists ====
Year	Date	Artist	Tour
1993		James Brown	
1994		Joe Cocker	
1995		Georgi Minchev	
1996	May 19	Sting	Mercury Falling Tour
1996	October 21	John McLaughlin & Paco de Lucía & Al Di Meola	
2000	April 16	Steve Vai & Eric Sardinas	The Ultra Zone album support
2001	May 21	Yngwie Malmsteen	War to End All Wars album support
2002	July 1	Joe Satriani	Strange Beautiful Tour
2004	October 18	Jerry Lee Lewis	
2005	October 5	Fish	Return to Childhood, 20th Anniversary Tour
2005	November 16	Steve Vai & Eric Sardinas	European Tour - Real Illusions: Reflections album support
2006	October 28	Al Di Meola	Consequence of Chaos album support
2007	July 23	Chuck Berry	
2007	September 8	Gary Moore	Old New Ballads Blues album support
2007	September 28	Glenn Hughes	Music for the Divine album support
2007	October 25	Robin Gibb	
2007	November 6	Chick Corea & Béla Fleck	The Enchantment album support
2008	June 11	Mark Knopfler	Kill to Get Crimson Tour
2008	July 21	Bobby McFerrin	
2009	February 22	James Blunt	
2009	June 30	Michael Bolton	
2009	September 9	Macy Gray	
2009	October 6	Lili Ivanova	
2009	October 14	Todor Kolev	a gala concert
2009	October 28	Sylvie Vartan	Tournée d'automne
2010	March 4	Alla Pugacheva	
2010	June 3	Bob Dylan	Europe Summer Tour
2010	October 30	Jon Lord	Concerto for Group and Orchestra
2011	April 11	Mariza	
2011	November 4	Paul Anka	
2012	May 30	Zaz	
2012	October 31	Steve Vai	
2013	March 22	Chris Norman	
2013	March 30	Tarja Turunen	Beauty and the Beat World Tour
2013	April 29	Mark Knopfler	Privateering Tour

=== Classical music performers and other spectacles ===
Year	Date	Artist	Notes
2000	September 16	Montserrat Caballé	
2006	May 21	Andrea Bocelli	
2007	June 23	Wadaiko Yamato	
2009	June 15	Nigel Kennedy	
2010	April 11	Wadaiko Yamato	
2010	April 14	Richard Clayderman	
2011	November 2	Lord of the Dance musical	
2012	December 10	José Carreras	
