= Oscar Bergendahl =

Swedish handball player (born 1995)

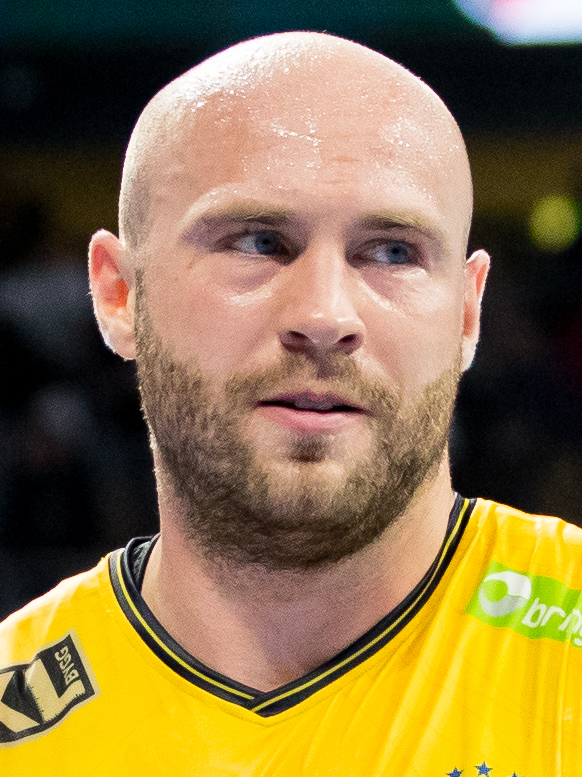
- Bergendahl in 2022

Personal information
- Nationality: Swedish
- Born: 8 March 1995 (age 31) Kungsbacka, Sweden
- Height: 192 cm (76 in)

Sport
- Sport: Handball
- Position: Pivot
- Current club: SC Magdeburg
- Number: 54

Youth career
- Years: Team
- –: HK Aranäs

Senior clubs
- Years: Team
- 2014–2018: Alingsås HK
- 2018–2022: GOG Håndbold
- 2022–2023: TVB Stuttgart
- 2023–: SC Magdeburg
National team
Years	Team	Apps	(Gls)
2017–	Sweden	65	(102)
Medal record
World Championship
Silver medal – second place	2021 Egypt
European Championship
Gold medal – first place	2022 Hungary/Slovakia
Bronze medal – third place	2024 Germany
- Updated on 14 January 2026

Oscar Bergendahl (born 8 March 1995) is a Swedish handball player for SC Magdeburg and the Swedish national team.

He represented Sweden at the 2021 World Men's Handball Championship in Egypt.

At the 2022 European Championship he won gold medals with Sweden.

== Honours ==
=== Club ===
- EHF Champions League:
  - Gold: 2023, 2025
- IHF Super Globe:
  - Gold: 2023
- Handball-Bundesliga:
  - Gold: 2024
- Danish Men's Handball League:
  - Gold: 2022
- DHB-Pokal:
  - Gold: 2024
  - Silver: 2023

=== International ===
- World Men's Handball Championship:
  - Silver: 2021
- European Men's Handball Championship:
  - Gold: 2022
  - Bronze: 2024

=== Individual ===
- Best defender of the European Championship: 2022
- All-Star Team as Best pivot Danish League 2021–22
