= 2029 IIHF World Championship =

2029 edition of the IIHF World Championship

Tournament details
- Host country: Slovakia
- Venues: 2 (in 2 host cities)
- Dates: 11–27 May
- Teams: 16

The 2029 IIHF World Championship will be hosted in Bratislava and Košice, Slovakia from 11 to 27 May 2029. The two host cities previously hosted the world championship in 2011 and 2019. Additionally, Bratislava co-hosted the championships of 1959 and 1992 as a part of Czechoslovakia.

== Participants ==
Qualified as hosts

- Slovakia

Automatic qualifier after a top 14 placement at the 2028 IIHF World Championship

- (N/A) TBD
- (N/A) TBD
- (N/A) TBD
- (N/A) TBD
- (N/A) TBD
- (N/A) TBD
- (N/A) TBD
- (N/A) TBD
- (N/A) TBD
- (N/A) TBD
- (N/A) TBD
- (N/A) TBD
- (N/A) TBD

Qualified through winning a promotion at the 2028 IIHF World Championship Division I

- (N/A) TBD

== Venues ==
Bratislava	2029 IIHF World Championship is located in Slovakia	Košice
Tipos aréna	2029 IIHF World Championship is located in Slovakia	Steel Arena
Capacity: 10,055	2029 IIHF World Championship is located in Slovakia	Capacity: 8,343
