= MVM Dome =

Sports facility in Budapest, Hungary

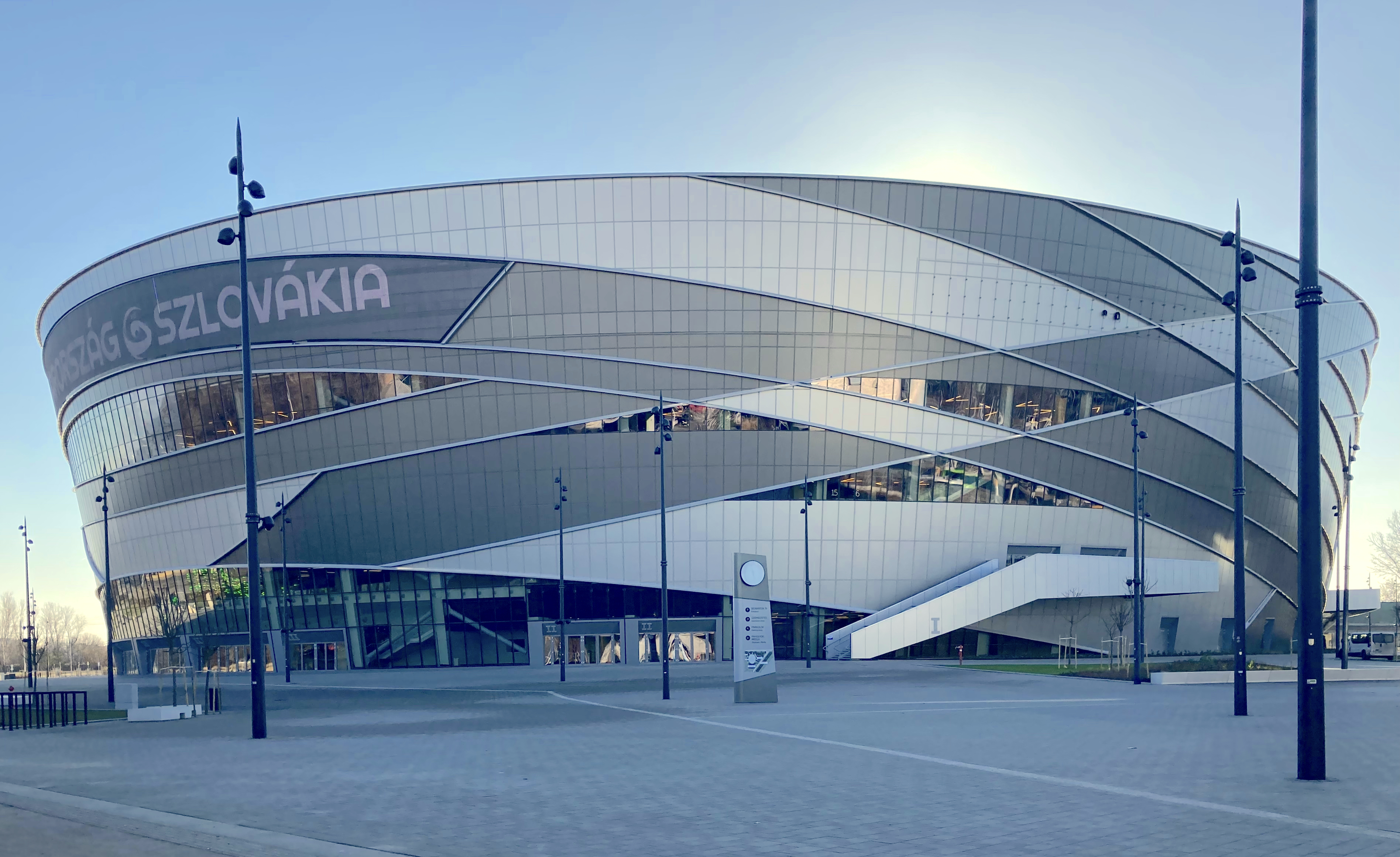
- Exterior as seen in mid-December 2021
- Interactive map of MVM Dome
- Former names: Budapest Multifunctional Arena (2021)
- Location: Budapest, Hungary
- Coordinates: 47°28′23.42″N 19°6′7.45″E
- Capacity: 20,028 (handball)

Construction
- Groundbreaking: September 2019
- Opened: 16 December 2021
- Cost: 78,717 billion HUF (230 million euros)
- Architect: György Skardelli
- Main contractor: Market Építő Zrt.

Tenants
- Hungary men's national handball team Hungary women's national handball team

Website
- https://www.mvm-dome.hu/

The MVM Dome, sometimes known as the Budapest Handball Sports Hall (Hungarian: Budapesti Kézilabda Sportcsarnok) and formally known as Budapest Multifunctional Arena, named after MVM Group, is Europe's largest handball arena located in Budapest, the capital city of Hungary.

Opened in December 2021, it hosted the 2022 European Men's Handball Championship and the 2024 European Women's Handball Championship. It will host the 2027 World Women's Handball Championship, and the Final Four of the Women's EHF Champions League from 2022 onwards.

== History ==
In June 2018, when Hungary and Slovakia were awarded the right to host the 2022 European Men's Handball Championship, László Papp Budapest Sports Arena was still the chosen venue in Budapest. The possibility of a new sports arena for the event was first mentioned in February 2019. The venue, the site of a former barracks, was officially proposed in April. The construction of the project was estimated at HUF 116 billion at the time of the tender, and the contract was signed for a net amount of HUF 78.7 billion, not including the HUF 13.6 billion paid for the purchase of the land and the additional HUF 1.7 billion spent on preparations.

Construction started on 29 November 2019. By June 2020, the 8 staircases were roughly completed and the construction of the grandstand structure began. In October 2020, construction of the roof structure started. In January 2021, ticket sales for the 2022 European Handball Championship started. At this time, the installation of the outer covering of the new arena began. The inauguration ceremony of the then still unnamed venue took place in 2021. The event concluded with a Punnany Massif concert and a 2×15 minute Hungary-Hungary gala match featuring some of the biggest names of recent history.

On 4 January 2022, it was announced that the name of the facility will be MVM Dome, based on the cooperation between MVM Zrt. and BMSK Zrt.

From 15 February 2022, the trustee of the sports arena is Ferencváros TC. From February 2022, the arena will be operated by Sportfive Hungary Kft. for ten years.

== Gallery ==
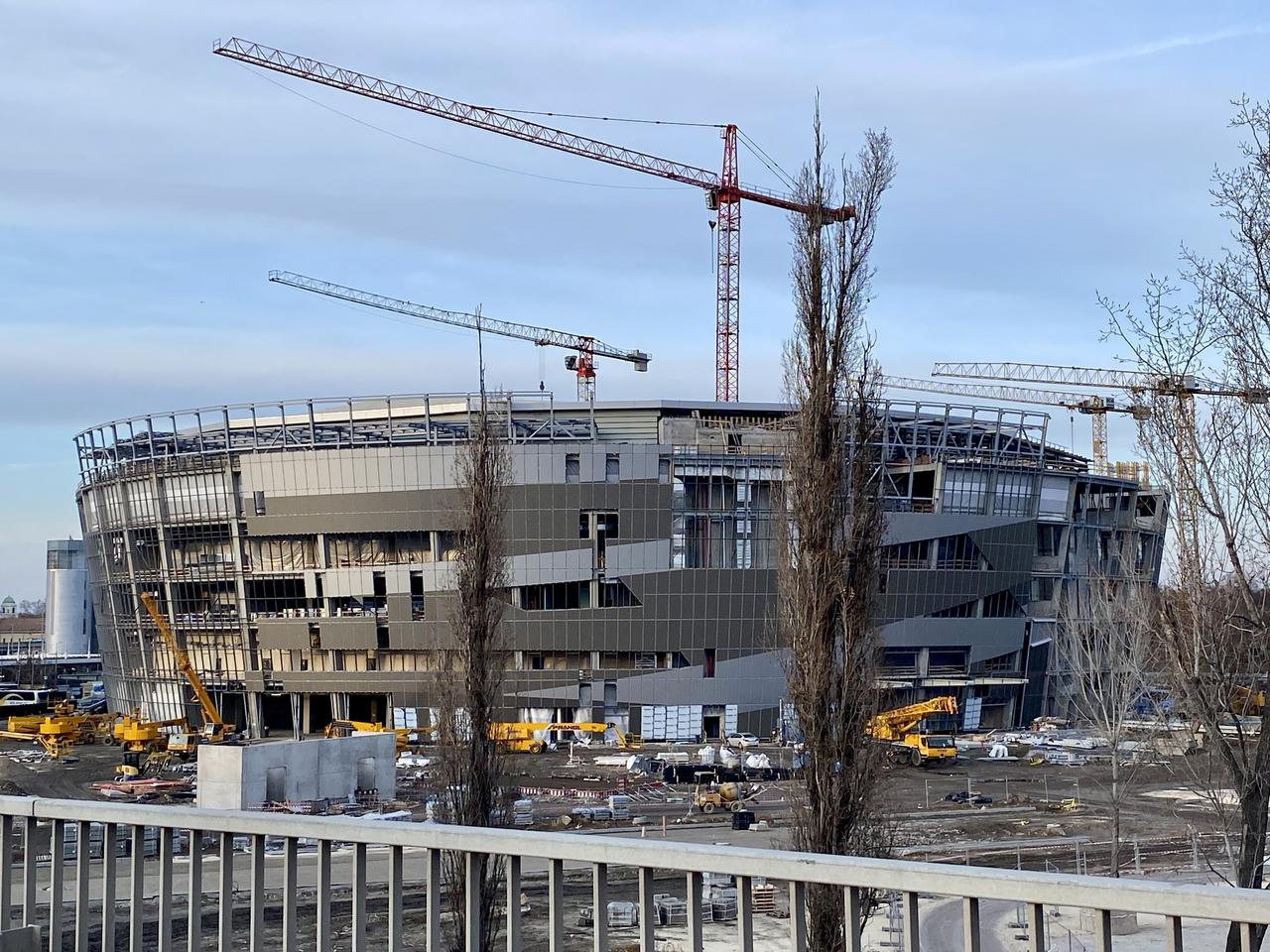

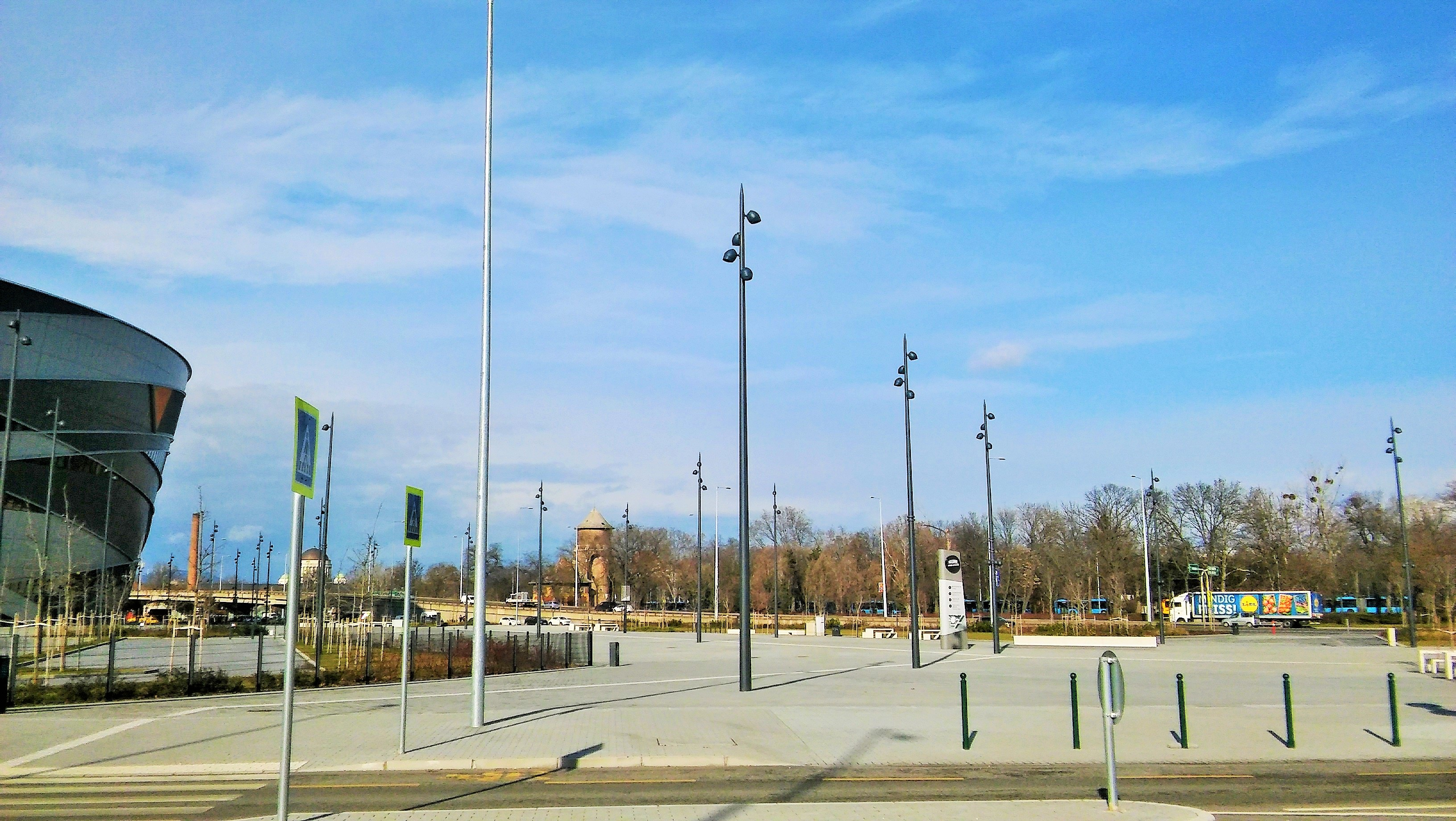

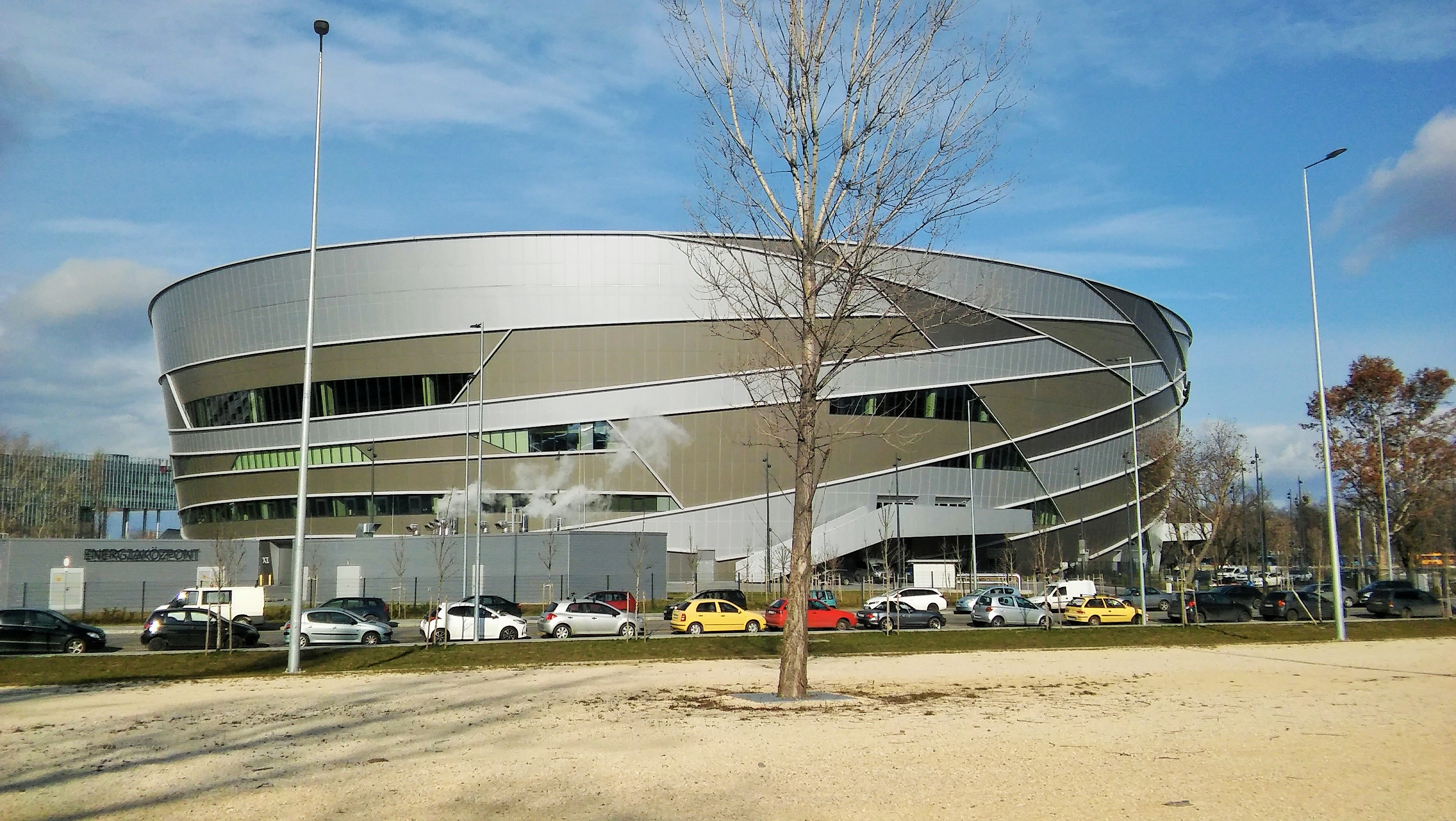

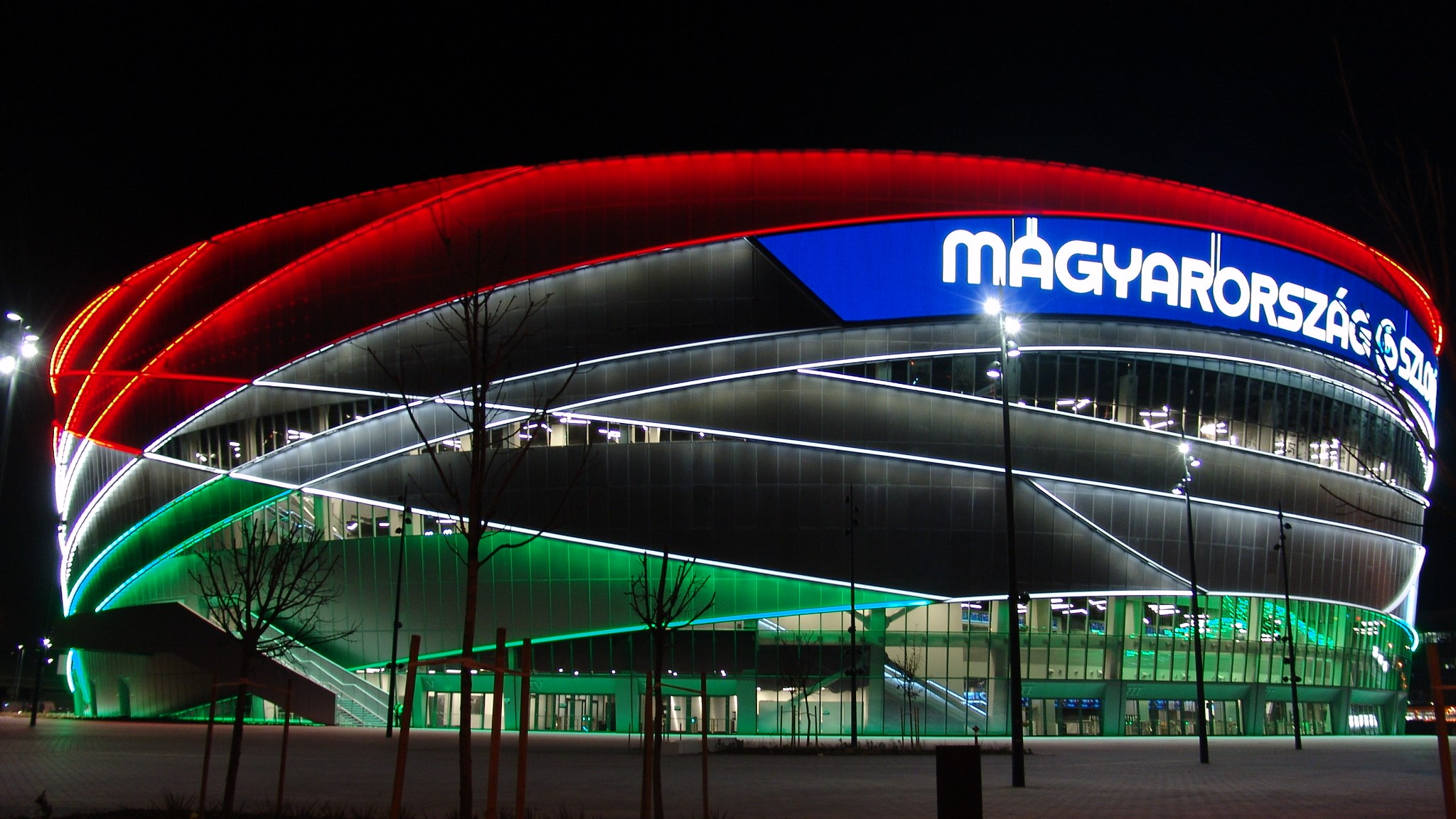

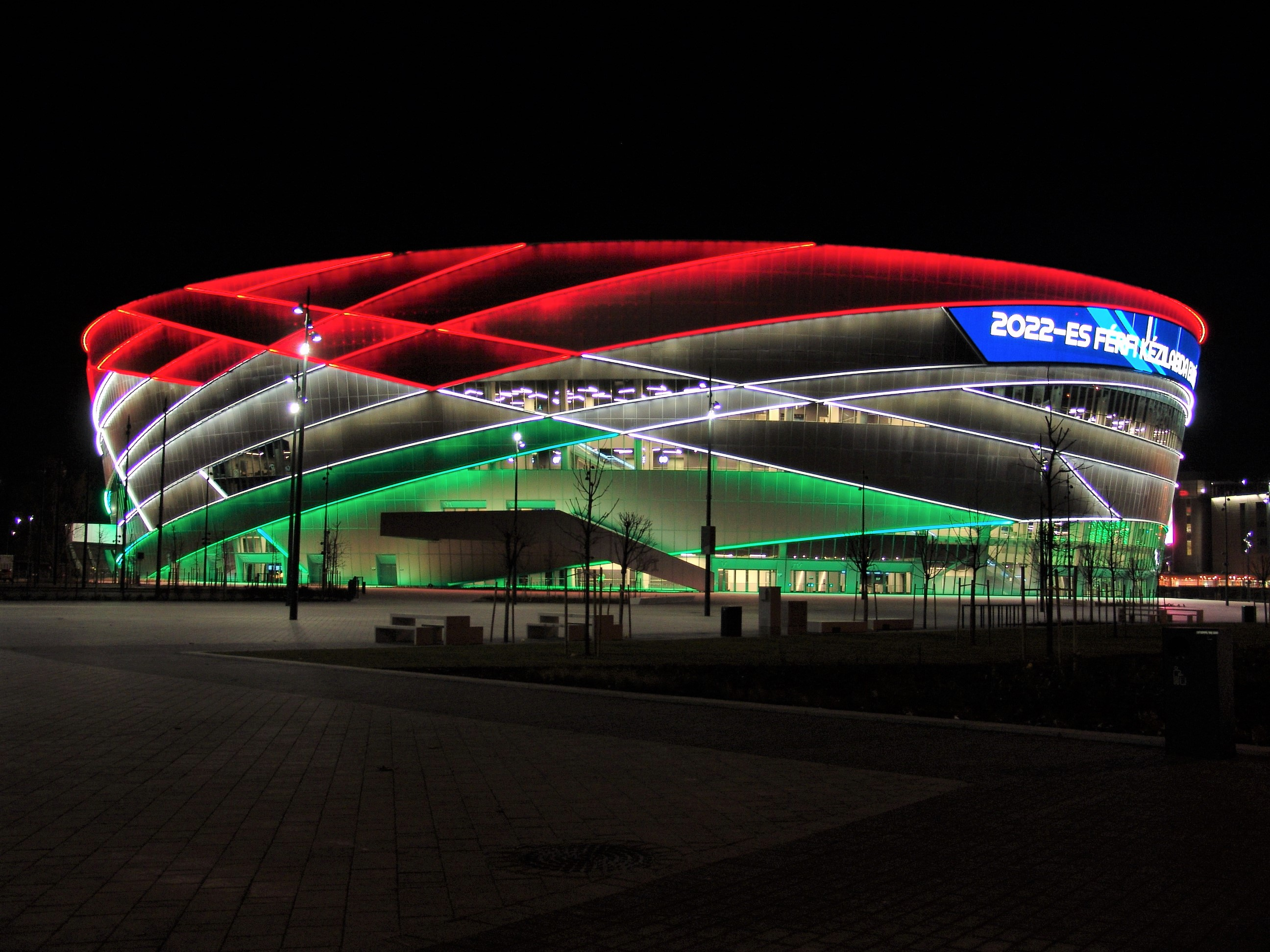

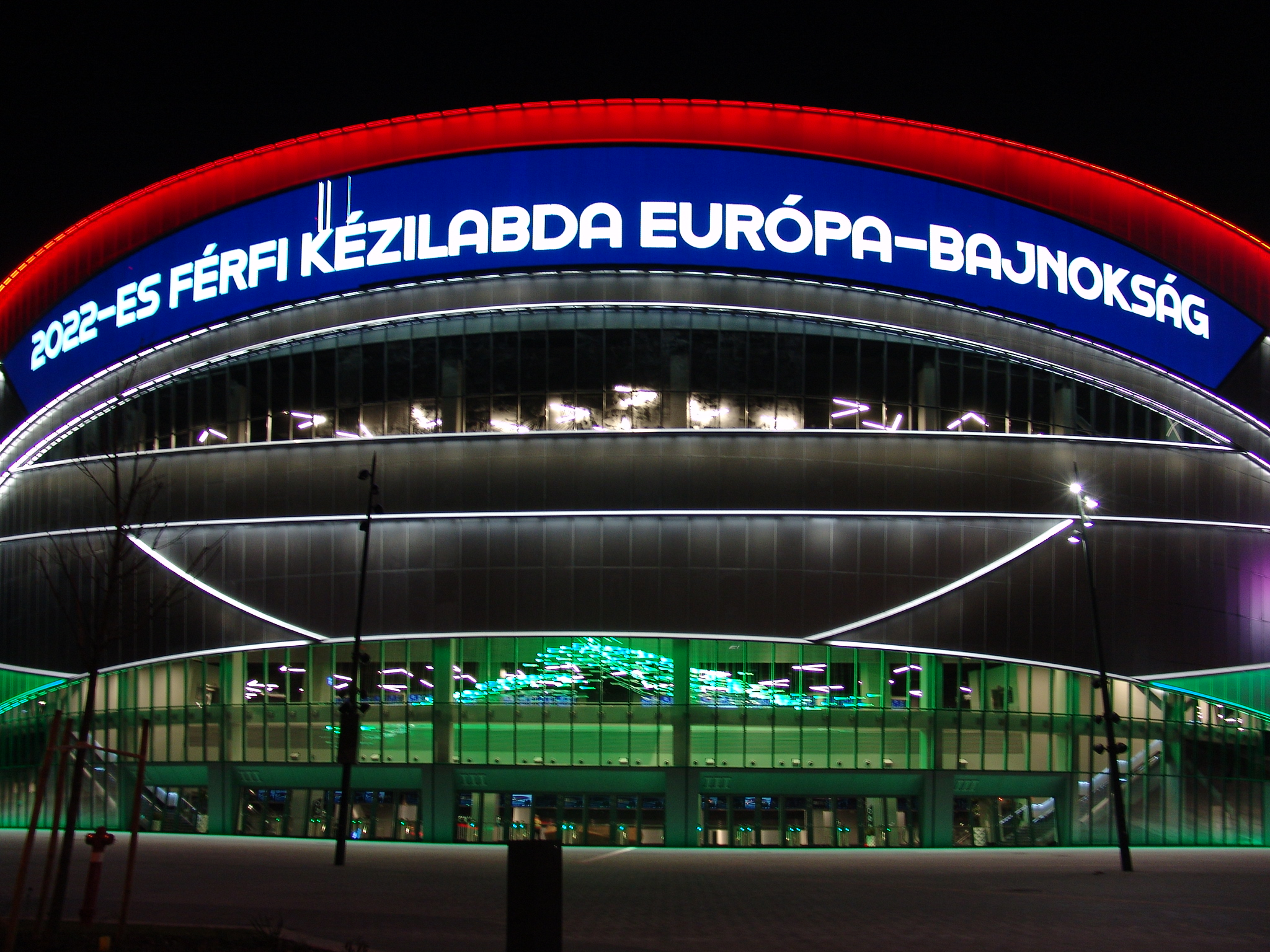

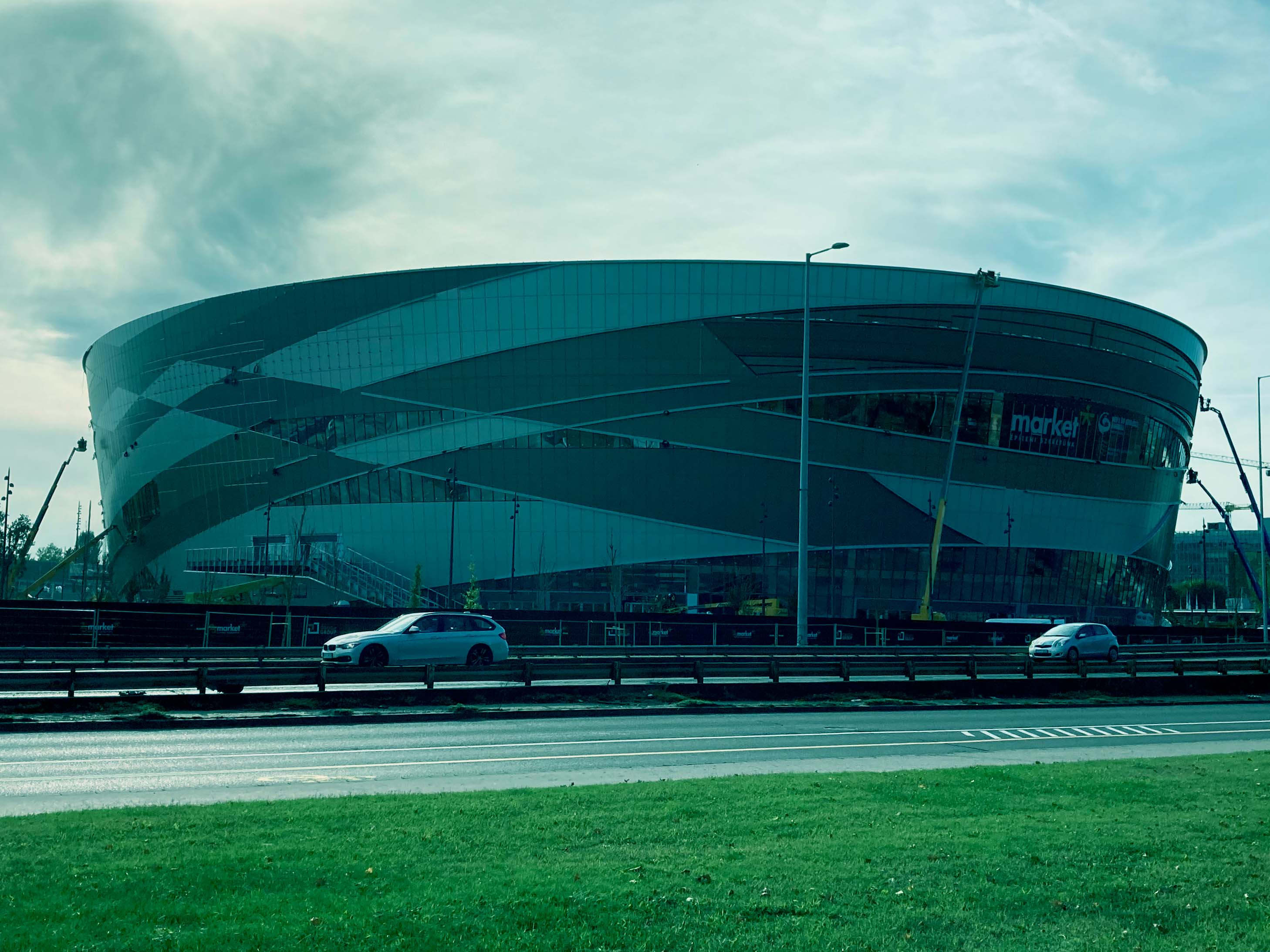

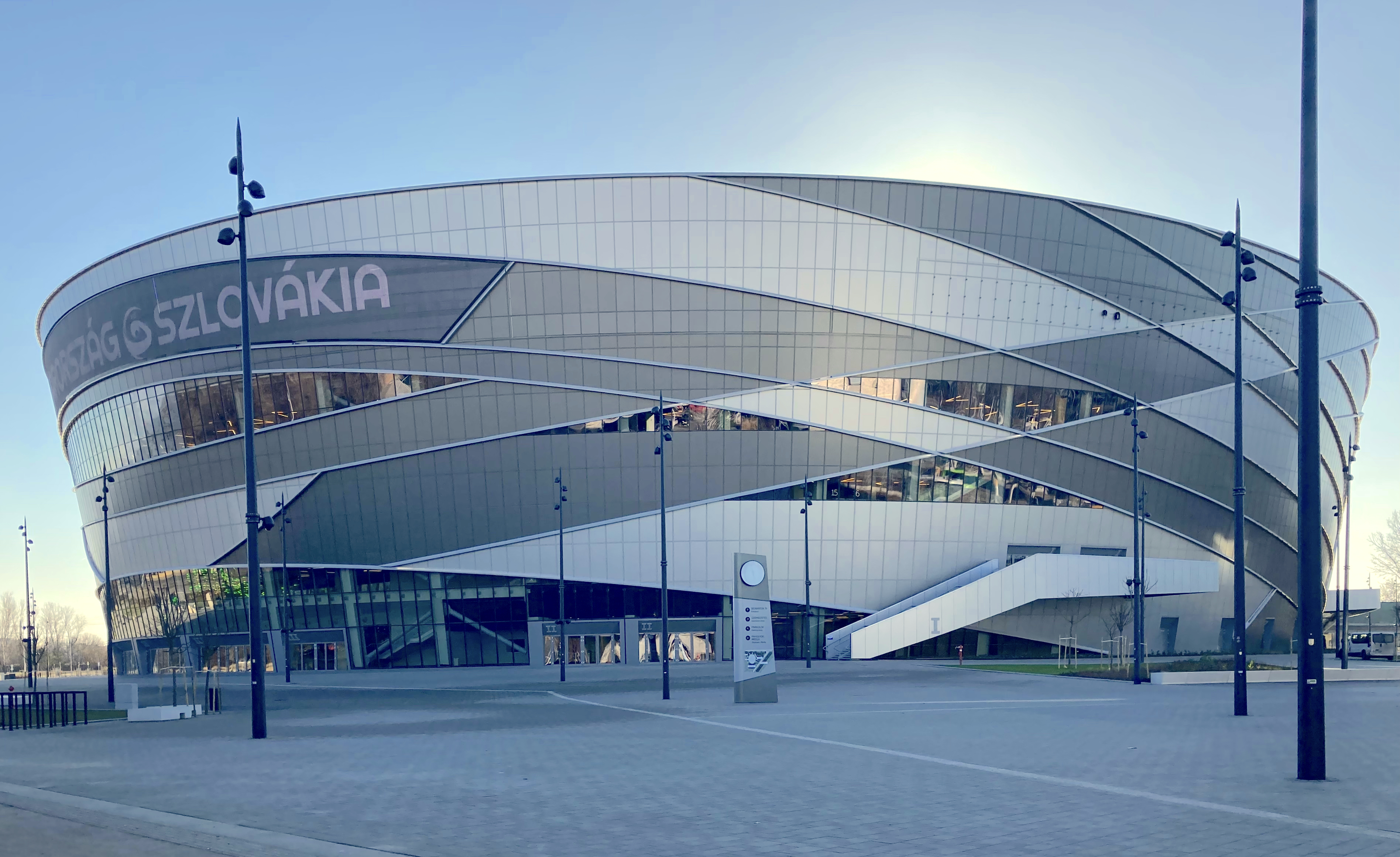

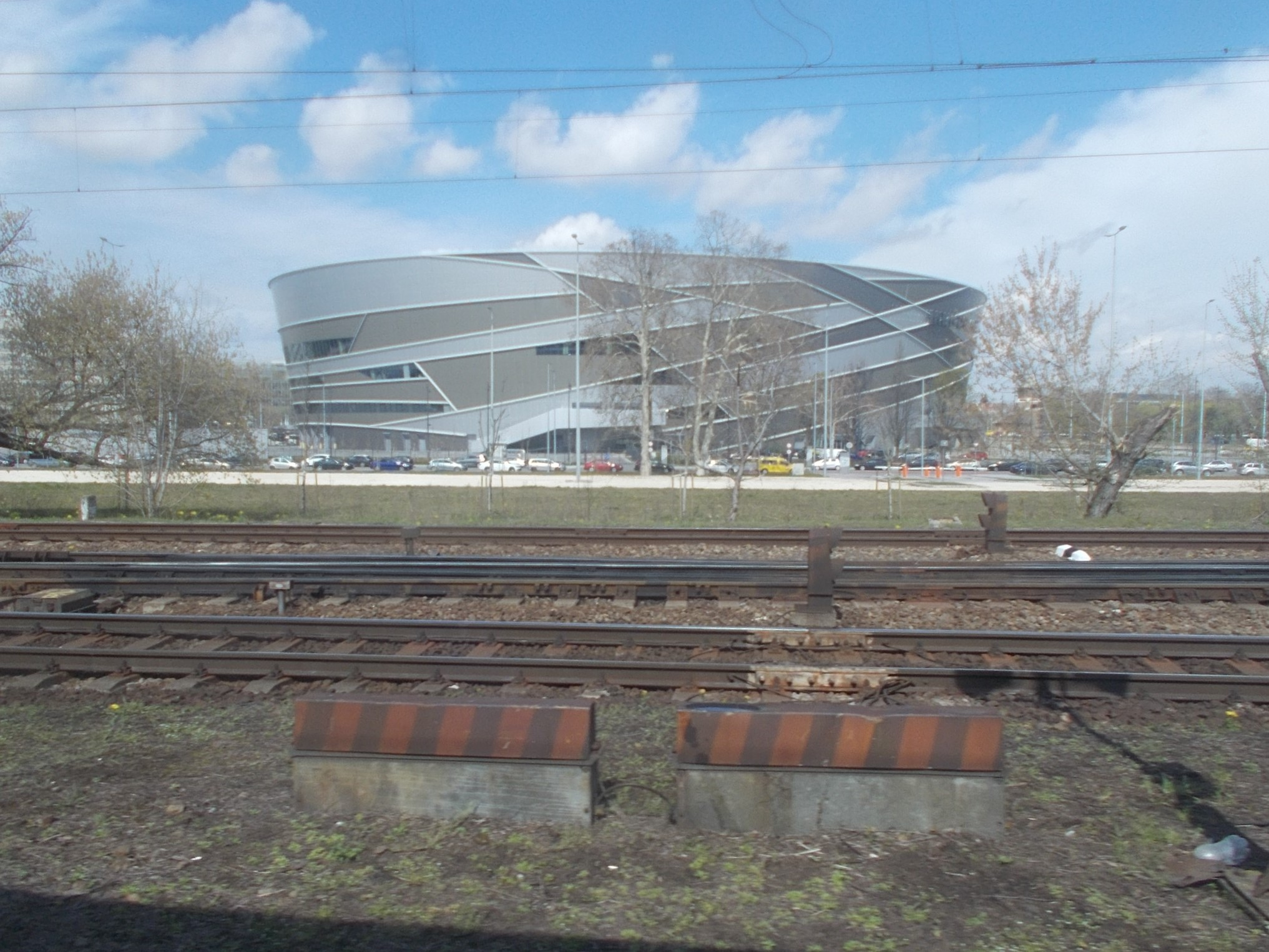

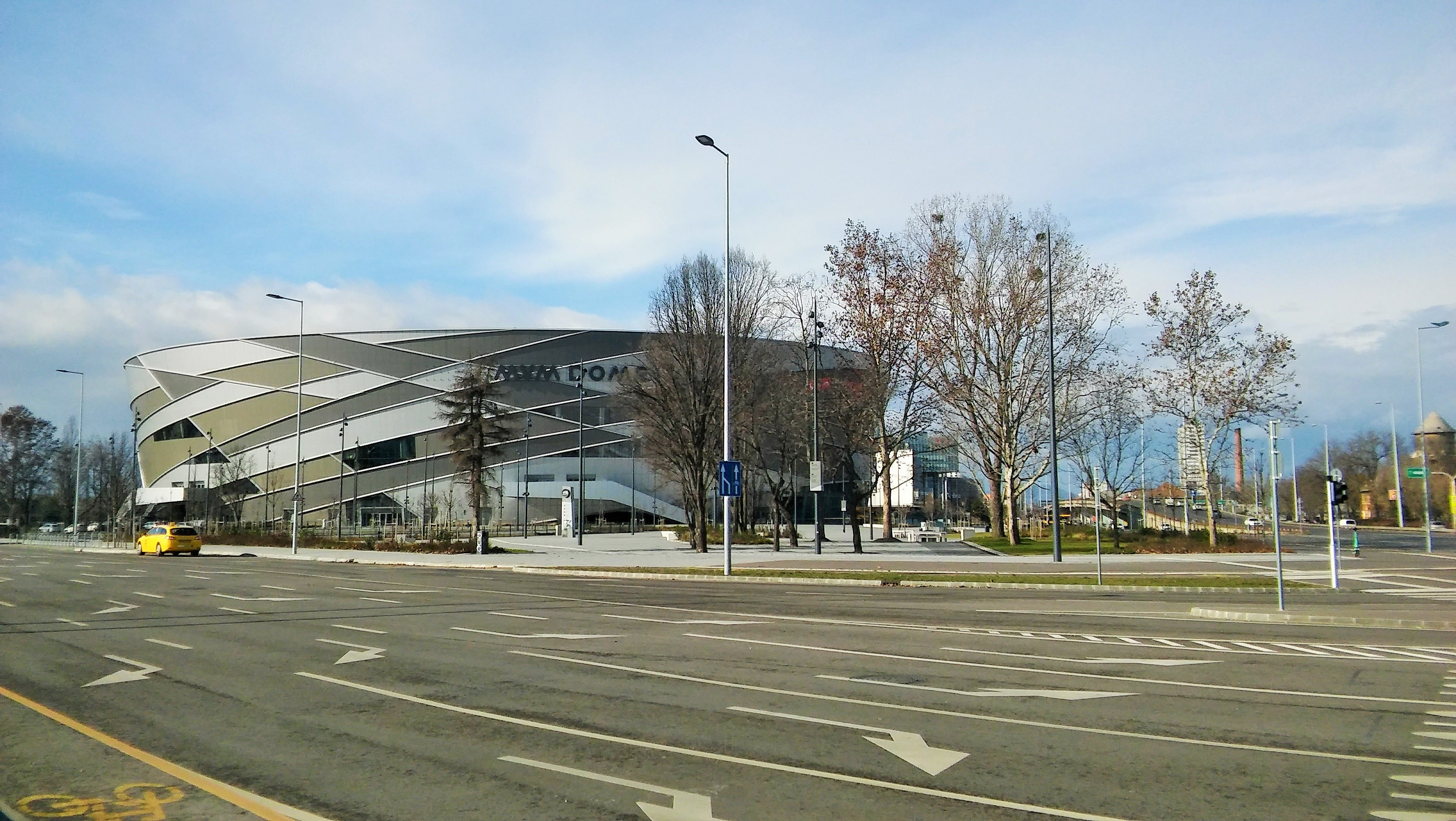

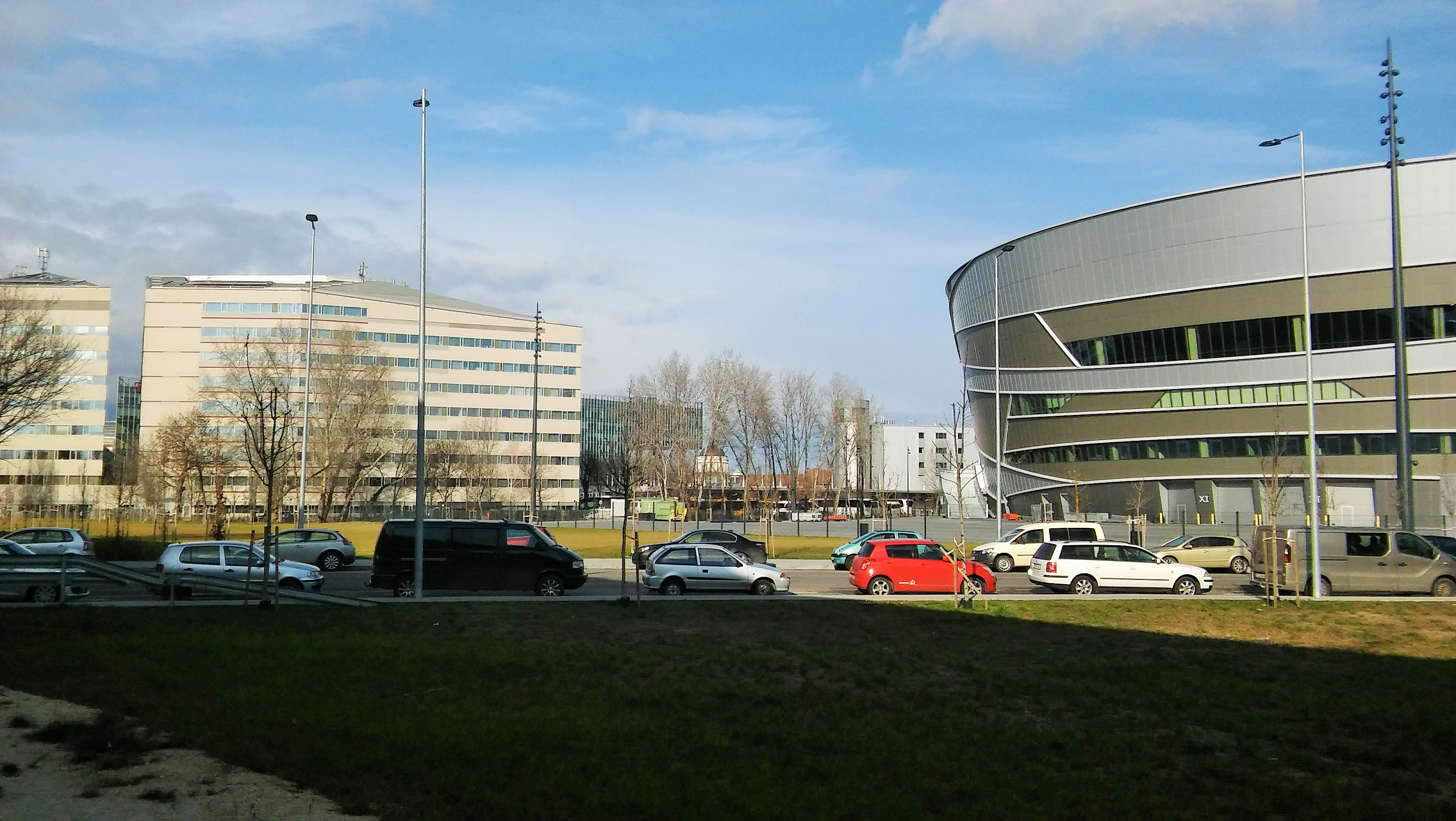

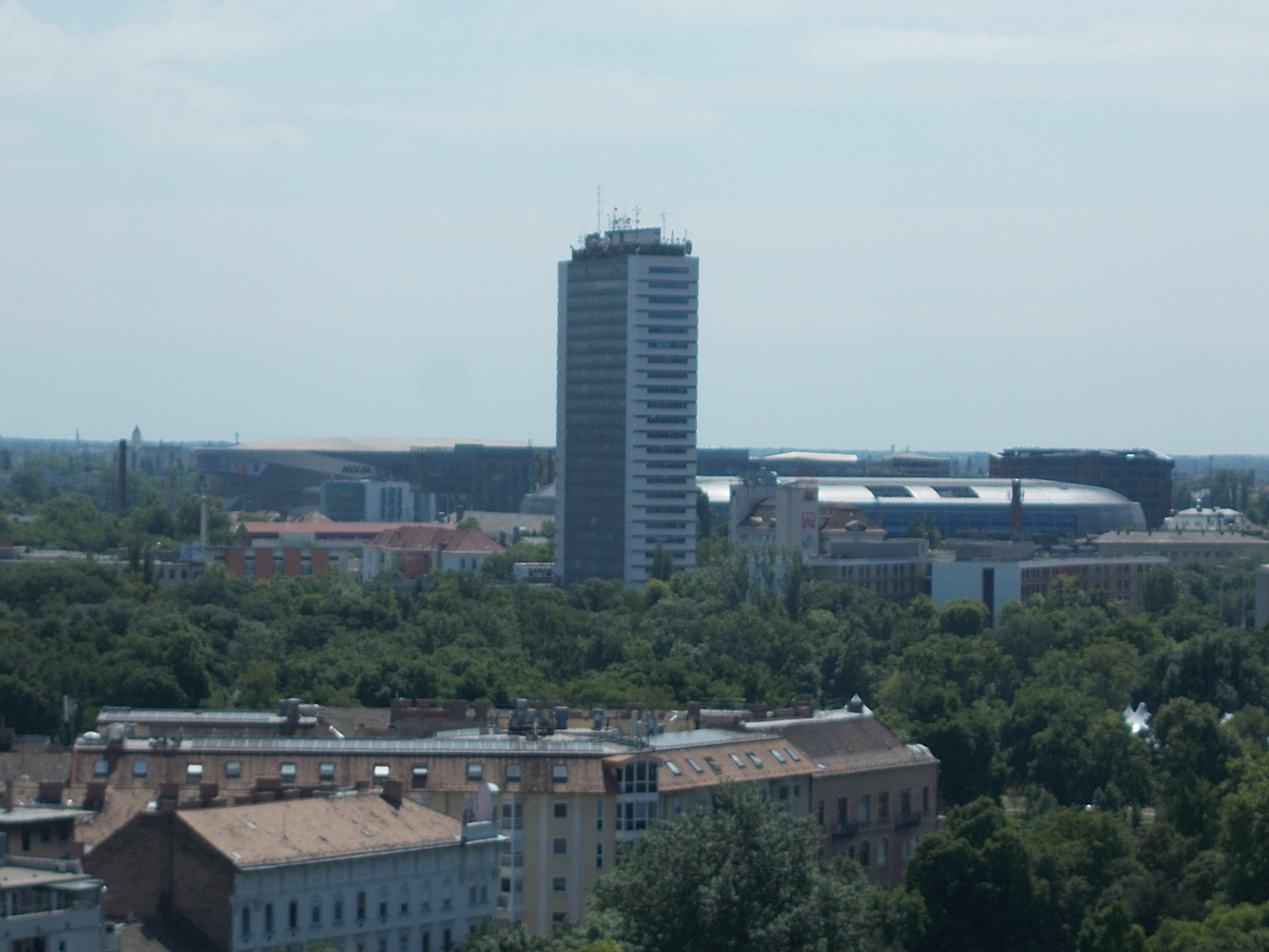

== Entertainment events ==
Concerts and other events at MVM Dome
Date	Artists	Event
2022
12 June	Enrique Iglesias	
5 November	Volbeat	
2023
8 February	Michael Bublé	Higher Tour
4 March	Plácido Domingo	
23 March	$uicideboy$	Grey Day Europe Tour
23 April	Roger Waters	This Is Not a Drill
26 May	Peter Bence	
29 May	Mötley Crüe & Def Leppard	The World Tour
1 July	Tom Jones	Ages & Stages Tour
17 October	Postmodern Jukebox	Life in the Past Lane Tour
2024
3 February	Superenduro GP of Hungary	FIM Superenduro World Championship
8–10 February	Cirque de Soleil	OVO
5 March	James Blunt	Who We Used To Be Tour
6 March	Harlem Globetrotters	World Tour
26 March	Depeche Mode	Memento Mori World Tour
13 April	Beton.Hofi	
30 April	Lara Fabian	
16 May	Thirty Seconds to Mars	Seasons Tour
22 June	Rod Stewart	One Last Time
10 October	Il Volo	
11 October	Lindsey Stirling	
14 October	Bryan Adams	So Happy It Hurts
22 October	Powerwolf	Wolfsnächte Tour
7 November	Hans Zimmer	A New Dimension
9 November	André Rieu	
13 November	Sleep Token	
17 November	Kygo	World Tour
23–24 November	Andrea Bocelli	
7 December	Peter Bence	Pianosphere
2025
27-28 May	Iron Maiden	Run for Your Lives World Tour
11 June	Santana	Oneness Tour
28 June	Tom Jones	
17 July	Lionel Richie	Say Hello to the Hits
20 July	Jennifer Lopez	Up All Night: Live in 2025
12 September	Robbie Williams	Britpop Tour
25 October	Calum Scott	The Avenoir Tour
27 October	Katy Perry	The Lifetimes Tour
31 October	The Offspring	
28–29 November	André Rieu	
11-14 December	StarLadder	Budapest CS2 Major 2025
16 December	Big Time Rush	In Real Life Worldwide

== See also ==
- List of indoor arenas in Hungary
