= Peter Bence =

Hungarian pianist

- Born: 5 September 1991 (age 35)
- Origin: Hungary
- Occupation: Pianist
- Instrument: Piano
- Years active: 1998–present
- Website: peterbence.com

Peter Bence (Hungarian: Péter Bence; born 5 September 1991) is a Hungarian pianist, composer and music producer. He has gained considerable popularity with his piano arrangements of "Despacito", Michael Jackson, Queen and Sia collecting over 500 million video hits and a popular following on his YouTube channel and Facebook page. His most viewed video of all time is his lively rendition of "Despacito."

Bence holds a Master of Arts in Film Scoring and Electronic Production & Design from the Berklee College of Music (2010-2015). Between January 2012 and March 2017 he held the world record for most piano key hits in one minute (765) according to the Guinness book of records.

== Life ==
Peter Bence started playing the piano at an early age and finished his first original composition, at age 7, which was heavily influenced by the music of Mozart and Chopin. In 2002, at 11 he published his first solo piano album of his early compositions called Green Music. In 2008 he released his second album, Nightfall. The sheet music for his composition Piano Piece Based on Fibonacci Sequence, an audition piece performed in 2009, was requested by many pianists. He was considered a musical prodigy by teachers and peers, and was already accepted at Franz Liszt University of Music in Debrecen, while he was still enrolled at elementary school.

In his teens, Peter started to show great interest in film music, especially the music of John Williams, which has opened up a new world for him and made him further explore himself musically.

After his training in classical piano and composition in Hungary, he continued his studies as a scholar at Berklee College of Music in the United States as a film scoring and piano major. Even though he was taking in every genre of music possible, he found his biggest influence in Michael Jackson.

In January 2012 he attained the Guinness World Record for the "most piano key hits in one minute" with 765 key hits, which he held until March 2017.

Peter began uploading videos to YouTube while at Berklee and in 2015 with his arrangement of Michael Jackson's "Bad" he quickly rose to fame, collecting 10 million views over a few days. He now has over 500+ million cumulative video views on Facebook and YouTube combined. In the past two years, he has performed for tens of thousands throughout 40 countries, opened BBC's Proms in the Park 2017, in Hyde Park, London for 50,000 people, and was featured on the Ellen DeGeneres Show's website, BBC, Buzzfeed, 9GAG, Classic FM, iHeart Radio and Billboard. He is currently finishing his debut album, which will feature some covers and solo piano compositions.

He won the 1st Prize InterArtia 2015 international competition in the category Pop Piano by the International Art Society in Volos, Greece.

== Discography ==
- 2002: Green Music
- 2008: Nightfall
- 2020: The Awesome Piano
- 2023: PianoSphere
