= Steel Arena (arena) =

Sports venue in Košice, Slovakia

Steel aréna
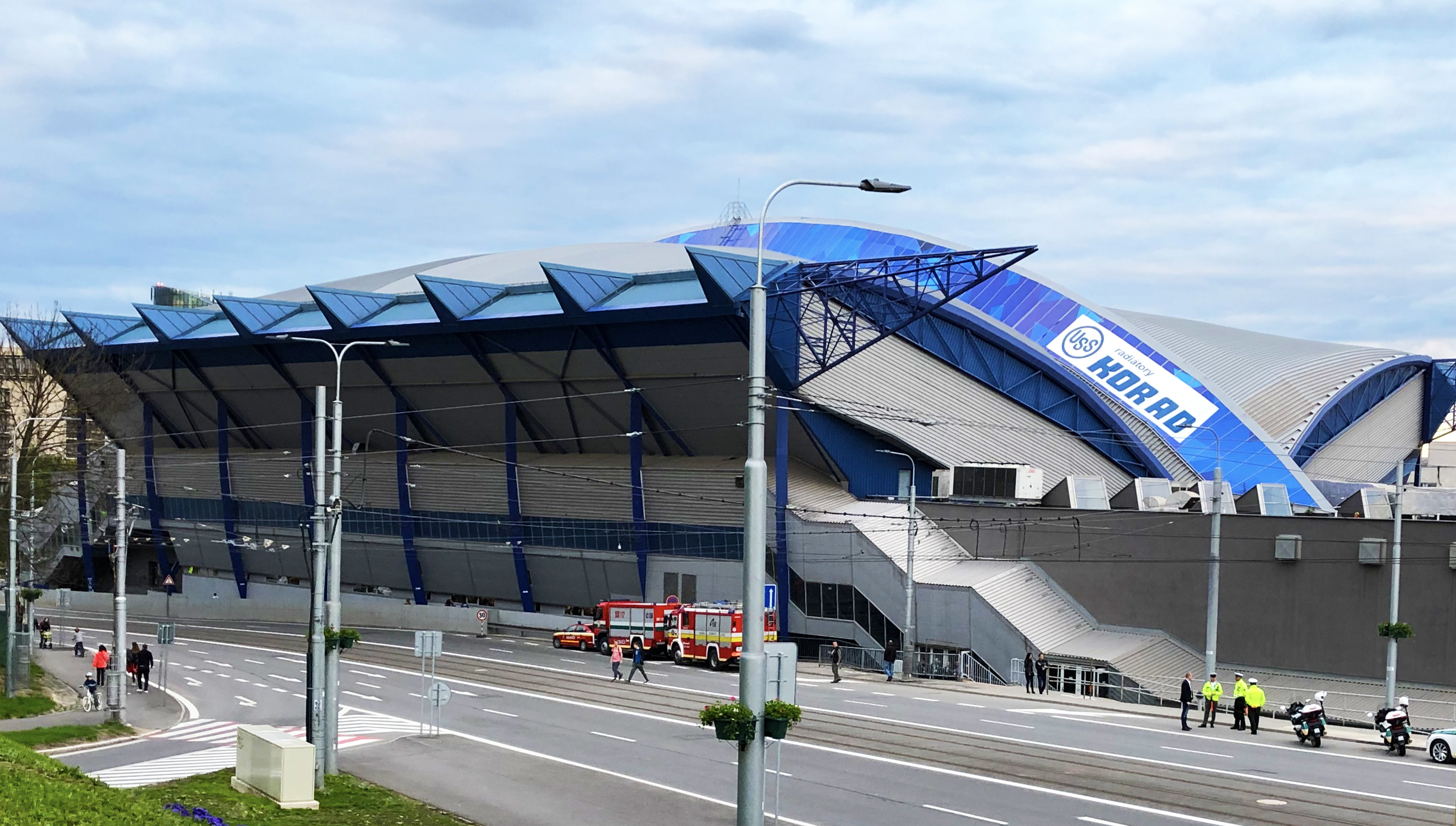
- Interactive map of Steel aréna
- Location: Nerudova 12; 040 01 Košice, Slovakia
- Coordinates: 48°42′53″N 21°14′53″E
- Owner: OZ Steel Arena (civic association)
- Capacity: 8,378

Construction
- Opened: February 24, 2006
- Cost: SKK 730 million ($17.6 million in 2006 dollars, $28.2 million in 2025 dollars)

Tenants
- HC Košice (2006–present); Slovakia men's national ice hockey team (2006–present)

Steel Arena – Ladislav Troják Stadium in Košice (Slovak: Steel aréna – Košický štadión L. Trojáka) is the home arena of the ice hockey club HC Košice. Its capacity is 8,343.

The arena opened on February 24, 2006, and was named in honor of the general sponsor of the club, U. S. Steel Košice (a member of the United States Steel Corporation) and also in honor of Ladislav Troják, a Košice-born hockey player who was the first Slovak to win the World Championship with the Czechoslovakia national team.

== Notable events ==
=== Sport ===
An overview of some sport events:

2007

- 2007 The nine-pin bowling World Championships

2008

- 2008 European Junior Wrestling Championships

2009

- 2009 World Championship in Bodybuilding

2011

- 2011 IIHF World Championship

2019

- 2019 IIHF World Championship
- 2019 ISBHF Ball Hockey World Championship

2021

- 2021 JGP Slovakia

2022

- 2022 European Men's Handball Championship
- 2029 IIHF World Championship

=== Music ===
An overview of some musical events from 2006 onward
Date	Artists
2006
October 7	Deep Purple
2007
March 23	Kim Wilde
November 6	Joe Cocker
2008
February 21	Wadaiko Yamato
May 7	Andrea Bocelli
October 23	Vanessa Mae
November 22	Seal
November 29	Jean Michel Jarre
2009
February 11	Buena Vista Social Club
April 23	Scorpions
May 20	Enrique Iglesias
June 17	Lenny Kravitz
June 20	Tiesto
October 29	Kool & the Gang
2010
February 27	Eros Ramazzotti
March 2	50 Cent
June 22	Elton John
October 28	Faithless
2011
May 11	David Guetta
June 6	Roxette
August 20	Tiësto
December 8	José Carreras
2012
February 23	Wadaiko Yamato
October 31	Armin Van Buuren
November 17	Sting
November 23	Piotr Rubik
2013
January 20	Jamiroquai
2014
May 16	Paul Van Dyk
June 27	Bob Dylan
November 8	Piotr Rubik
2015
September 30	Eros Ramazzotti
2016
March 2	Scorpions
October 10	Bryan Adams
December 10	Omega
2017
December 16	Omega
2018
October 27	Piotr Rubik
2019
March 1	Dire Straits
October 19	Vanessa Mae
2022
March 13	Sting

== Transport ==
Steel Arena is located near the historical center of Košice, near Štúrova Street.

Service	Stop	Line
Bus	Krajský súd	10, 11, 20, 21, 23, 25, 32, 52, 56, 71, 72
Tram	Krajský súd	6, R1

The arena includes a parking deck with space for 496 cars. An additional 524 parking spaces are available at the OC Galeria shopping center, approximately 500 m away.

== Gallery ==
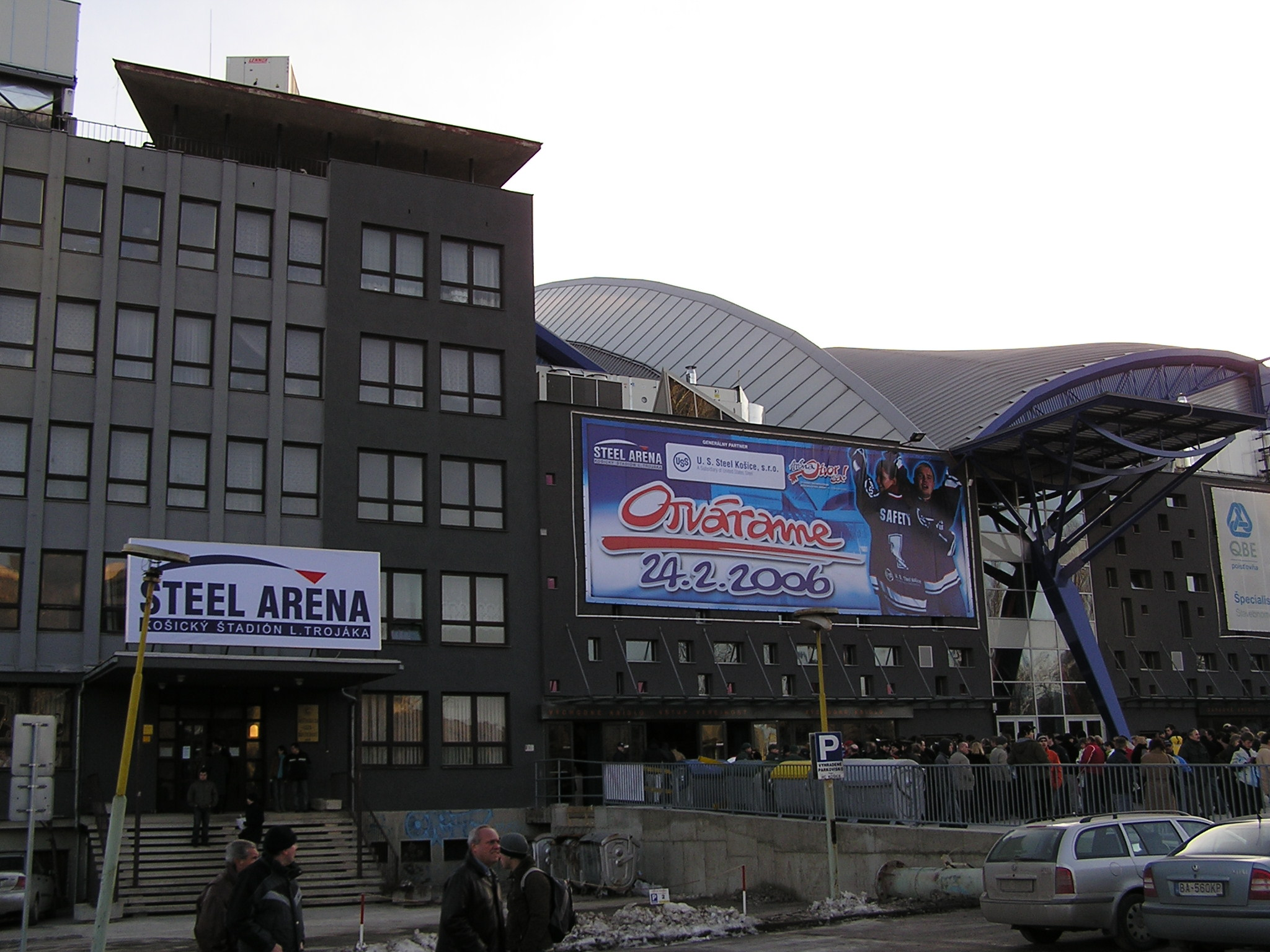
Steel Arena opening (February 24, 2006)

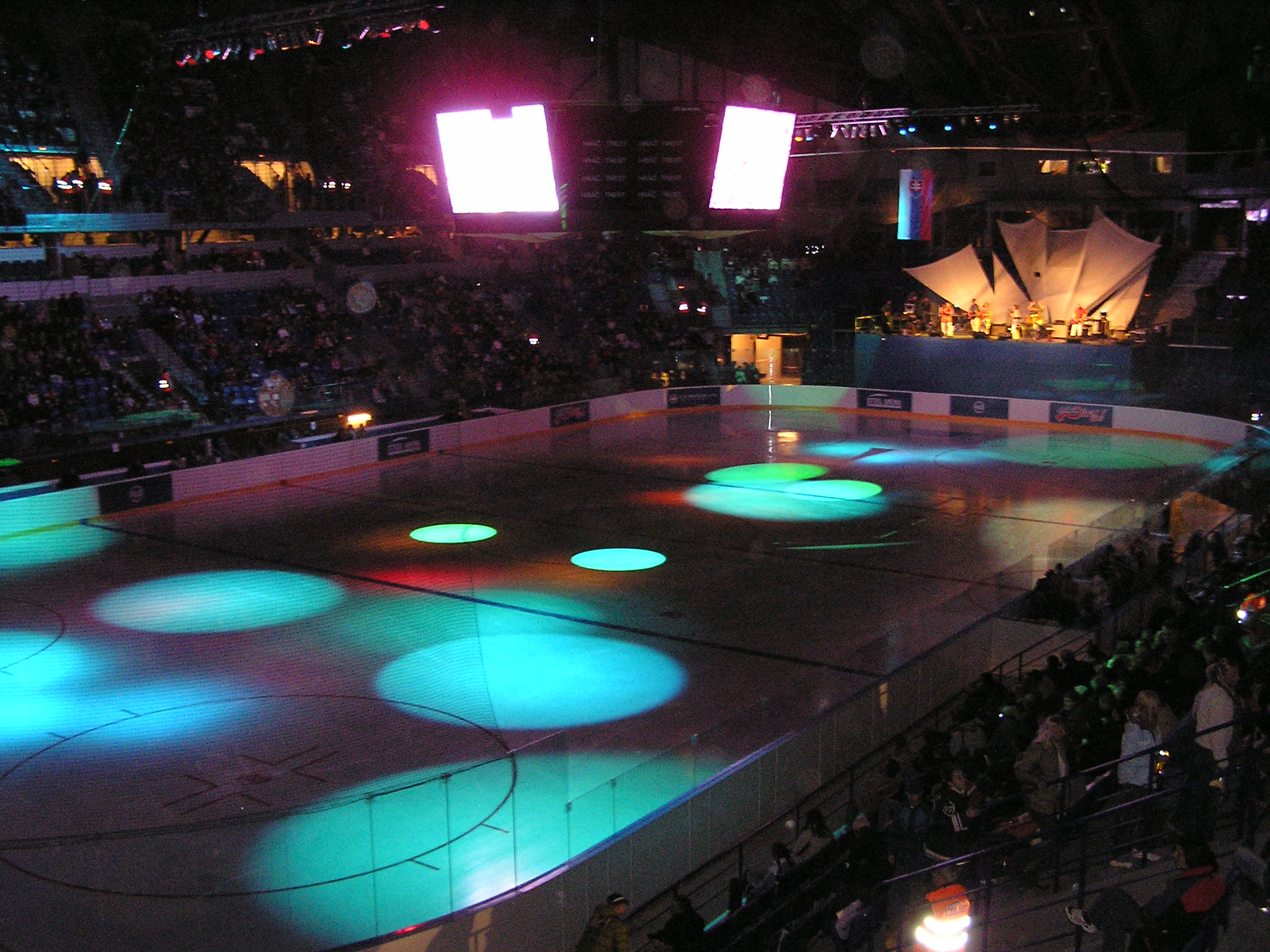
Grand opening ceremony

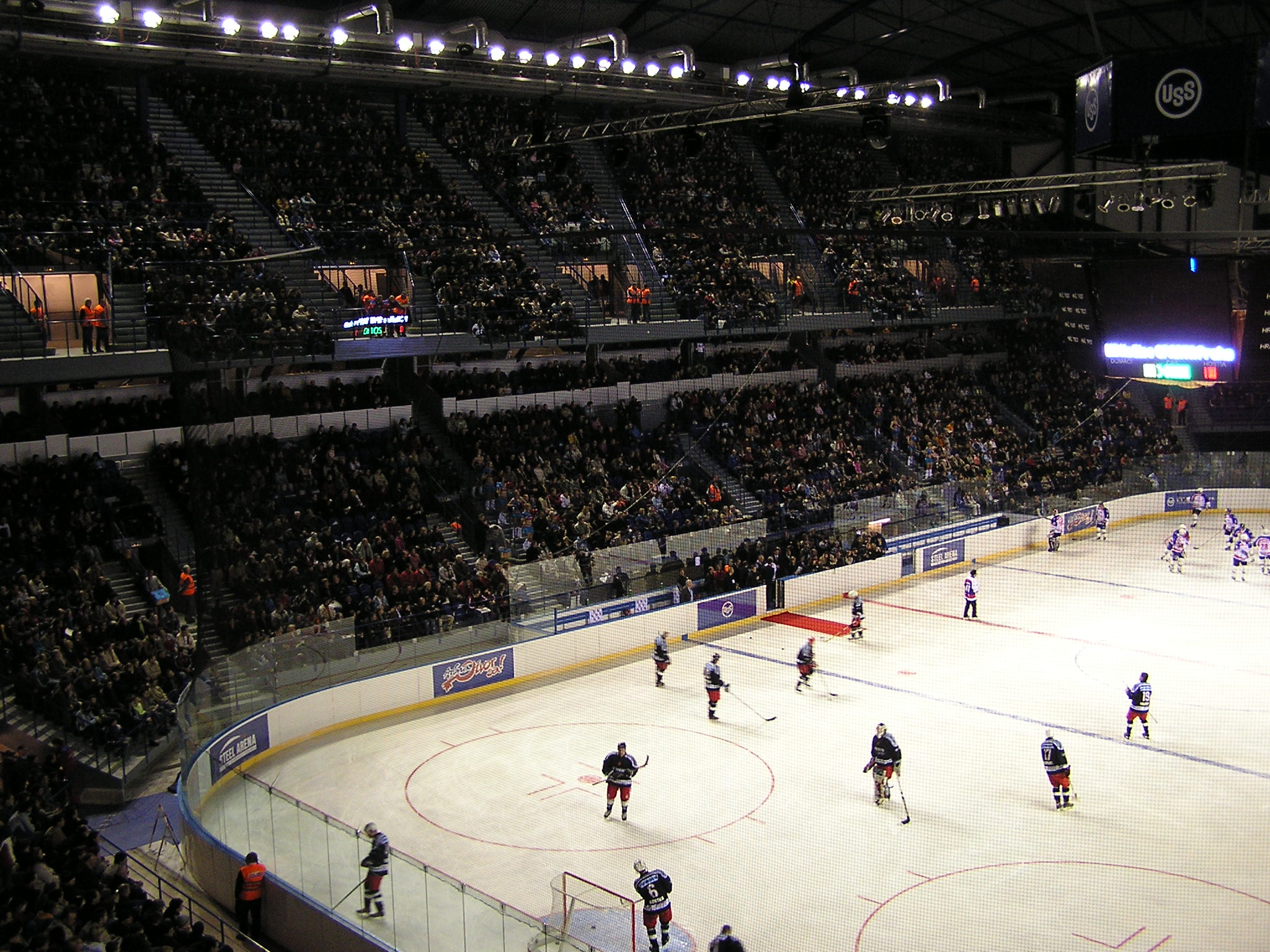
The first ice hockey game at the Steel Arena – "Old Boys" HC Sparta Prague vs "Old Boys" HC Košice

== See also ==
- List of indoor arenas in Slovakia
