= 2022 European Men's Handball Championship =

2022 edition of the European Men's Handball Championship

2022 EHF European Men's Handball Championship
2022-es férfi kézilabda-Európa-bajnokság (in Hungarian) Majstrovstvá Európy v hádzanej mužov 2022 (in Slovak)

Tournament details
- Host countries: Hungary; Slovakia
- Venues: 5 (in 5 host cities)
- Dates: 13–30 January
- Teams: 24 (from 1 confederation)

Final positions
- Champions: Sweden (5th title)
- Runners-up: Spain
- Third place: Denmark
- Fourth place: France

Tournament statistics
- Matches played: 65
- Goals scored: 3,633 (55.89 per match)
- Attendance: 312,892 (4,814 per match)
- Top scorers: (Iceland) Ómar Ingi Magnússon (59 goals)

Awards
- Best player: (Sweden) Jim Gottfridsson

The 2022 EHF European Men's Handball Championship was the 15th edition of the tournament and the second to feature 24 national teams. It was co-hosted in two countries – Hungary and Slovakia – from 13 to 30 January 2022. For the matches in Slovakia the spectator capacity was only 25% due to the COVID-19 pandemic. In Hungary the capacity was 100%.

Sweden won their first title in 20 years after defeating defending champions Spain in the final. Denmark captured the bronze medal after defeating France. Hosts Hungary and Slovakia finished 15th and 18th.

== Bidding process ==
=== Bids ===
On 4 May 2017 it was announced that the following nations had made an official expression of interest:

- Belgium, Spain & France
- Czech Republic, Hungary & Slovakia
- Denmark, Germany & Switzerland
- (North Macedonia) Macedonia (potentially with Slovenia)
- Russia & Belarus
- Lithuania

When the deadline for submitting the final bids was over, the following applications had been received:

- Belgium, Spain & France
- Denmark & Switzerland (withdrew shortly before the vote)
- Hungary & Slovakia

=== Host selection ===
On 20 June, at the 14th ordinary EHF Congress held in Glasgow, Hungary and Slovakia were selected to host the competition.

Voting results
Country
Country	Votes
Hungary & Slovakia	32
Belgium, Spain & France	14
Denmark & Switzerland	–
Total	46

== Venues ==
Following is a list of all venues and host cities which were used.

Hungary			Slovakia	
Budapest	Debrecen	Szeged	Bratislava	Košice
MVM Dome	Főnix Arena	Pick Aréna	Ondrej Nepela Arena	Steel Aréna
Capacity: 20,022	Capacity: 6,500	Capacity: 8,143	Capacity: 10,000	Capacity: 7,900
2022 European Men's Handball Championship is located in Hungary		Slovakia (in orange) is north of Hungary (in green).	2022 European Men's Handball Championship is located in Slovakia	

== Qualification ==
The qualification for the final tournament took place between January 2019 and May 2021. The two host teams, Hungary and Slovakia, and the two best placed teams from the previous championship, Spain and Croatia, qualified automatically, leaving a total of 40 national teams to compete for the remaining 20 places in the final tournament.

The competition consisted of three rounds: two qualification phases and a relegation round. The first qualification phase involved teams that did not participate in the second round of the 2020 qualification tournament. The two best teams advanced to a relegation round, where they were joined by the best European team from the 2019 IHF Emerging Nations Championship and the three worst ranked fourth-placed teams from the second round of the 2020 qualification. The three winners of the two-legged relegation round matches advanced to the second and last qualifying phase, joining the remaining 21 teams that participated in the 2020 championship and the remaining eight teams that were eliminated in the second round of the 2020 qualification. Those 32 teams were divided into eight groups by four teams, with top two teams and four best ranked third-teams qualifying.

=== Qualified teams ===
Country	Qualified as	Date qualification was secured	Previous appearances in tournament
Hungary	Co-host	20 June 2018	12 (1994, 1996, 1998, 2004, 2006, 2008, 2010, 2012, 2014, 2016, 2018, 2020)
Slovakia	Co-host	20 June 2018	3 (2006, 2008, 2012)
Spain	Winner of 2020 European Championship	24 January 2020	14 (1994, 1996, 1998, 2000, 2002, 2004, 2006, 2008, 2010, 2012, 2014, 2016, **2018**, **2020**)
Croatia	Runner-up of 2020 European Championship	24 January 2020	14 (1994, 1996, 1998, 2000, 2002, 2004, 2006, 2008, 2010, 2012, 2014, 2016, 2018, 2020)
Germany	Group 2 winner	10 January 2021	13 (1994, 1996, 1998, 2000, 2002, **2004**, 2006, 2008, 2010, 2012, **2016**, 2018, 2020)
Serbia	Group 1 winner	8 February 2021	6 (2010, 2012, 2014, 2016, 2018, 2020)
Sweden	Group 8 winner	28 April 2021	13 (**1994**, 1996, **1998**, **2000**, **2002**, 2004, 2008, 2010, 2012, 2014, 2016, 2018, 2020)
Russia	Group 3 winner	28 April 2021	13 (1994, **1996**, 1998, 2000, 2002, 2004, 2006, 2008, 2010, 2012, 2014, 2016, 2020)
North Macedonia	Group 7 runner-up	28 April 2021	6 (1998, 2012, 2014, 2016, 2018, 2020)
Denmark	Group 7 winner	28 April 2021	13 (1994, 1996, 2000, 2002, 2004, 2006, **2008**, 2010, **2012**, 2014, 2016, 2018, 2020)
France	Group 1 runner-up	29 April 2021	14 (1994, 1996, 1998, 2000, 2002, 2004, **2006**, 2008, **2010**, 2012, **2014**, 2016, 2018, 2020)
Norway	Group 6 winner	29 April 2021	9 (2000, 2006, 2008, 2010, 2012, 2014, 2016, 2018, 2020)
Iceland	Group 4 runner-up	29 April 2021	11 (2000, 2002, 2004, 2006, 2008, 2010, 2012, 2014, 2016, 2018, 2020)
Portugal	Group 4 winner	29 April 2021	6 (1994, 2000, 2002, 2004, 2006, 2020)
Belarus	Group 6 runner-up	29 April 2021	6 (1994, 2008, 2014, 2016, 2018, 2020)
Slovenia	Group 5 winner	29 April 2021	12 (1994, 1996, 2000, 2002, 2004, 2006, 2008, 2010, 2012, 2016, 2018, 2020)
Netherlands	Group 5 runner-up	29 April 2021	1 (2020)
Austria	Group 2 runner-up	2 May 2021	4 (2010, 2014, 2018, 2020)
Czech Republic	Group 3 runner-up	2 May 2021	10 (1996, 1998, 2002, 2004, 2008, 2010, 2012, 2014, 2018, 2020)
Montenegro	Group 8 runner-up	2 May 2021	5 (2008, 2014, 2016, 2018, 2020)
Bosnia and Herzegovina	Top 4 ranked of third-placed teams	2 May 2021	1 (2020)
Poland	Top 4 ranked of third-placed teams	2 May 2021	9 (2002, 2004, 2006, 2008, 2010, 2012, 2014, 2016, 2020)
Ukraine	Top 4 ranked of third-placed teams	2 May 2021	6 (2000, 2002, 2004, 2006, 2010, 2020)
Lithuania	Top 4 ranked of third-placed teams	2 May 2021	1 (1998)

Note: Bold indicates champion for that year. Italic indicates host for that year.

== Marketing ==
The official logo and slogan was unveiled on 25 January 2020 at the EHF Extraordinary Congress in Stockholm. The logo included the national colours of both host nations – red, green, white and blue, forming the handball and an eye. This relates to the event's motto "Watch Games, See More", highlighting opportunities for fans around the six venues.

== Draw ==
The draw took place in Budapest on 6 May 2021.

=== Seeding ===
The seedings were announced on 3 May 2021. The organizing countries had the right to allocate one team to each of the groups they were hosting due to potential spectators' interest. Hungary (assigned to group B) selected Croatia (assigned to group C) and Slovenia (assigned to group A), while Slovakia (assigned to group F) selected Germany (assigned to group D) and the Czech Republic (assigned to group E).

Pot 1	Pot 2	Pot 3	Pot 4
Spain; Croatia (assigned to C); Norway; Slovenia (assigned to A); Germany (assigned to D); Portugal	Sweden; Hungary (assigned to B); Russia; Denmark; Serbia; Austria	Slovakia (assigned to F); Belarus; Iceland; Czech Republic (assigned to E); France; North Macedonia	Netherlands; Montenegro; Ukraine; Poland; Bosnia and Herzegovina; Lithuania

== Referees ==
The referee pairs were selected on 10 September 2021. Two more pairs were selected on 10 January 2022.

Referees
Austria	Radojko Brkić; Andrei Jusufhodžić
Croatia	Matija Gubica; Boris Milošević
Czech Republic	Václav Horáček; Jiří Novotný
Denmark	Mads Hansen; Jesper Madsen
France	Charlotte Bonaventura; Julie Bonaventura
Germany	Robert Schulze; Tobias Tönnies
Hungary	Ádám Bíró; Olivér Kiss
Iceland	Jónas Elíasson; Anton Pálsson
Lithuania	Vaidas Mažeika; Mindaugas Gatelis
Montenegro	Ivan Pavićević; Miloš Ražnatović

Referees
North Macedonia	Slave Nikolov; Gjorgji Nachevski
Norway	Lars Jørum; Håvard Kleven
Portugal	Duarte Santos; Ricardo Fonseca
Romania	Bogdan Stark; Romeo Ştefan
Serbia	Nenad Nikolić; Dušan Stojković
Slovakia	Boris Mandák; Mário Rudinský
Slovenia	Bojan Lah; David Sok
Spain	Andreu Marín; Ignacio García
Sweden	Mirza Kurtagic; Mattias Wetterwik
Switzerland	Arthur Brunner; Morad Salah

== Squads ==
Each team consists of up to 20 players, of whom 16 may be fielded for each match.

== Preliminary round ==
All times are local (UTC).

=== Group A ===
Pos	Team	Pld	W	D	L	GF	GA	GD	Pts	Qualification
1	Denmark	3	3	0	0	95	65	+30	6	Main round
2	Montenegro	3	2	0	1	82	86	−4	4	Main round
3	Slovenia	3	1	0	2	82	92	−10	2	
4	North Macedonia	3	0	0	3	70	86	−16	0	

Source: EHF
Rules for classification: 1) points; 2) head-to-head points; 3) head-to-head goal difference; 4) head-to-head number of goals scored; 5) goal difference.

13 January 2022; 18:00	Slovenia	27–25	North Macedonia	Főnix Hall, Debrecen; Attendance: 2,034; Referees: Brkić, Jusufhodžić (AUT)
13 January 2022; 18:00	Dolenec 5	(13–10)	C. Kuzmanoski 8	Főnix Hall, Debrecen; Attendance: 2,034; Referees: Brkić, Jusufhodžić (AUT)
13 January 2022; 18:00	1× (yellow card) 6× (suspension) 1× (red card)	Report	1× (yellow card) 2× (suspension)	Főnix Hall, Debrecen; Attendance: 2,034; Referees: Brkić, Jusufhodžić (AUT)

13 January 2022; 20:30	Denmark	30–21	Montenegro	Főnix Hall, Debrecen; Attendance: 2,142; Referees: Stark, Ştefan (ROU)
13 January 2022; 20:30	M. Hansen 10	(18–10)	B. Vujović 7	Főnix Hall, Debrecen; Attendance: 2,142; Referees: Stark, Ştefan (ROU)
13 January 2022; 20:30	4× (suspension)	Report	2× (yellow card) 5× (suspension)	Főnix Hall, Debrecen; Attendance: 2,142; Referees: Stark, Ştefan (ROU)

15 January 2022; 18:00	North Macedonia	24–28	Montenegro	Főnix Hall, Debrecen; Attendance: 2,625; Referees: Gatelis, Mažeika (LTU)
15 January 2022; 18:00	Velkovski 6	(16–17)	Anđelić, M. Vujović 6	Főnix Hall, Debrecen; Attendance: 2,625; Referees: Gatelis, Mažeika (LTU)
15 January 2022; 18:00	1× (yellow card) 2× (suspension)	Report	3× (yellow card) 5× (suspension)	Főnix Hall, Debrecen; Attendance: 2,625; Referees: Gatelis, Mažeika (LTU)

15 January 2022; 20:30	Slovenia	23–34	Denmark	Főnix Hall, Debrecen; Attendance: 3,812; Referees: Marín, García (ESP)
15 January 2022; 20:30	Mačkovšek 6	(14–16)	M. Hansen 8	Főnix Hall, Debrecen; Attendance: 3,812; Referees: Marín, García (ESP)
15 January 2022; 20:30	5× (suspension)	Report	1× (yellow card) 4× (suspension)	Főnix Hall, Debrecen; Attendance: 3,812; Referees: Marín, García (ESP)

17 January 2022; 18:00	Montenegro	33–32	Slovenia	Főnix Hall, Debrecen; Attendance: 1,203; Referees: Kurtagic, Wetterwik (SWE)
17 January 2022; 18:00	B. Vujović 9	(16–19)	Dolenec, Kodrin 6	Főnix Hall, Debrecen; Attendance: 1,203; Referees: Kurtagic, Wetterwik (SWE)
17 January 2022; 18:00	1× (yellow card) 7× (suspension) 1× (red card)	Report	1× (yellow card) 5× (suspension)	Főnix Hall, Debrecen; Attendance: 1,203; Referees: Kurtagic, Wetterwik (SWE)

17 January 2022; 20:30	North Macedonia	21–31	Denmark	Főnix Hall, Debrecen; Attendance: 1,561; Referees: Mandák, Rudinský (SVK)
17 January 2022; 20:30	Peševski 6	(11–15)	Kirkeløkke 9	Főnix Hall, Debrecen; Attendance: 1,561; Referees: Mandák, Rudinský (SVK)
17 January 2022; 20:30	3× (suspension)	Report	1× (yellow card) 2× (suspension)	Főnix Hall, Debrecen; Attendance: 1,561; Referees: Mandák, Rudinský (SVK)

=== Group B ===
Pos	Team	Pld	W	D	L	GF	GA	GD	Pts	Qualification
1	Iceland	3	3	0	0	88	82	+6	6	Main round
2	Netherlands	3	2	0	1	91	88	+3	4	Main round
3	Hungary (H)	3	1	0	2	89	92	−3	2	
4	Portugal	3	0	0	3	85	91	−6	0	

Source: EHF
Rules for classification: 1) points; 2) head-to-head points; 3) head-to-head goal difference; 4) head-to-head number of goals scored; 5) goal difference.
(H) Hosts

13 January 2022; 20:30	Hungary	28–31	Netherlands	MVM Dome, Budapest; Attendance: 20,022; Referees: Kurtagic, Wetterwik (SWE)
13 January 2022; 20:30	Lékai 8	(10–13)	Smits 11	MVM Dome, Budapest; Attendance: 20,022; Referees: Kurtagic, Wetterwik (SWE)
13 January 2022; 20:30	1× (yellow card) 5× (suspension)	Report	1× (yellow card) 5× (suspension) 1× (red card)	MVM Dome, Budapest; Attendance: 20,022; Referees: Kurtagic, Wetterwik (SWE)

14 January 2022; 20:30	Portugal	24–28	Iceland	MVM Dome, Budapest; Attendance: 6,205; Referees: Schulze, Tönnies (GER)
14 January 2022; 20:30	Iturriza, Silva 4	(10–14)	Guðjónsson 5	MVM Dome, Budapest; Attendance: 6,205; Referees: Schulze, Tönnies (GER)
14 January 2022; 20:30	2× (yellow card) 4× (suspension)	Report	1× (yellow card) 4× (suspension)	MVM Dome, Budapest; Attendance: 6,205; Referees: Schulze, Tönnies (GER)

16 January 2022; 18:00	Portugal	30–31	Hungary	MVM Dome, Budapest; Attendance: 20,022; Referees: Horáček, Novotný (CZE)
16 January 2022; 18:00	three players 5	(15–14)	Máthé 8	MVM Dome, Budapest; Attendance: 20,022; Referees: Horáček, Novotný (CZE)
16 January 2022; 18:00	1× (yellow card) 6× (suspension) 1× (red card)	Report	6× (suspension)	MVM Dome, Budapest; Attendance: 20,022; Referees: Horáček, Novotný (CZE)

16 January 2022; 20:30	Iceland	29–28	Netherlands	MVM Dome, Budapest; Attendance: 14,587; Referees: Brkić, Jusufhodžić (AUT)
16 January 2022; 20:30	Guðjónsson 8	(15–13)	Smits 13	MVM Dome, Budapest; Attendance: 14,587; Referees: Brkić, Jusufhodžić (AUT)
16 January 2022; 20:30	1× (yellow card) 7× (suspension)	Report	6× (suspension)	MVM Dome, Budapest; Attendance: 14,587; Referees: Brkić, Jusufhodžić (AUT)

18 January 2022; 18:00	Iceland	31–30	Hungary	MVM Dome, Budapest; Attendance: 20,022; Referees: Marín, García (ESP)
18 January 2022; 18:00	Elísson 9	(17–17)	Bánhidi 6	MVM Dome, Budapest; Attendance: 20,022; Referees: Marín, García (ESP)
18 January 2022; 18:00	6× (suspension) 1× (red card)	Report	2× (yellow card) 6× (suspension) 1× (red card)	MVM Dome, Budapest; Attendance: 20,022; Referees: Marín, García (ESP)

18 January 2022; 20:30	Netherlands	32–31	Portugal	MVM Dome, Budapest; Attendance: 11,287; Referees: Jørum, Kleven (NOR)
18 January 2022; 20:30	Smits 8	(17–13)	Iturriza 7	MVM Dome, Budapest; Attendance: 11,287; Referees: Jørum, Kleven (NOR)
18 January 2022; 20:30	1× (yellow card) 5× (suspension)	Report	1× (yellow card) 7× (suspension)	MVM Dome, Budapest; Attendance: 11,287; Referees: Jørum, Kleven (NOR)

=== Group C ===
Pos	Team	Pld	W	D	L	GF	GA	GD	Pts	Qualification
1	France	3	3	0	0	92	70	+22	6	Main round
2	Croatia	3	2	0	1	83	72	+11	4	Main round
3	Serbia	3	1	0	2	76	75	+1	2	
4	Ukraine	3	0	0	3	71	105	−34	0	

Source: EHF
Rules for classification: 1) points; 2) head-to-head points; 3) head-to-head goal difference; 4) head-to-head number of goals scored; 5) goal difference.

13 January 2022; 18:00	Serbia	31–23	Ukraine	Pick Aréna, Szeged; Attendance: 4,658; Referees: Jørum, Kleven (NOR)
13 January 2022; 18:00	Kukić 7	(17–11)	Horiha 6	Pick Aréna, Szeged; Attendance: 4,658; Referees: Jørum, Kleven (NOR)
13 January 2022; 18:00	1× (yellow card) 3× (suspension)	Report	1× (yellow card) 6× (suspension)	Pick Aréna, Szeged; Attendance: 4,658; Referees: Jørum, Kleven (NOR)

13 January 2022; 20:30	Croatia	22–27	France	Pick Aréna, Szeged; Attendance: 5,422; Referees: Horáček, Novotný (CZE)
13 January 2022; 20:30	Čupić 6	(11–13)	Descat 7	Pick Aréna, Szeged; Attendance: 5,422; Referees: Horáček, Novotný (CZE)
13 January 2022; 20:30	2× (yellow card) 3× (suspension) 1×	Report	1× (yellow card) 1× (suspension)	Pick Aréna, Szeged; Attendance: 5,422; Referees: Horáček, Novotný (CZE)

David Mandić received a blue card in the 47th minute for a punch against the head of Kentin Mahé. He received a one game suspension from the EHF and he missed the next game against Serbia.

15 January 2022; 18:00	France	36–23	Ukraine	Pick Aréna, Szeged; Attendance: 8,143; Referees: Mandák, Rudinský (SVK)
15 January 2022; 18:00	Nahi 5	(17–11)	Horiha 7	Pick Aréna, Szeged; Attendance: 8,143; Referees: Mandák, Rudinský (SVK)
15 January 2022; 18:00	1× (yellow card) 4× (suspension)	Report	3× (yellow card) 2× (suspension) 1× (red card)	Pick Aréna, Szeged; Attendance: 8,143; Referees: Mandák, Rudinský (SVK)

15 January 2022; 20:30	Croatia	23–20	Serbia	Pick Aréna, Szeged; Attendance: 8,143; Referees: Schulze, Tönnies (GER)
15 January 2022; 20:30	Čupić, Martinović 6	(11–9)	Radivojević 5	Pick Aréna, Szeged; Attendance: 8,143; Referees: Schulze, Tönnies (GER)
15 January 2022; 20:30	1× (yellow card) 6× (suspension)	Report	1× (yellow card) 4× (suspension)	Pick Aréna, Szeged; Attendance: 8,143; Referees: Schulze, Tönnies (GER)

17 January 2022; 18:00	Ukraine	25–38	Croatia	Pick Aréna, Szeged; Attendance: 4,038; Referees: Stark, Ştefan (ROU)
17 January 2022; 18:00	Artemenko 5	(13–18)	Martinović, Šipić 7	Pick Aréna, Szeged; Attendance: 4,038; Referees: Stark, Ştefan (ROU)
17 January 2022; 18:00	1× (yellow card) 5× (suspension)	Report	1× (yellow card) 5× (suspension)	Pick Aréna, Szeged; Attendance: 4,038; Referees: Stark, Ştefan (ROU)

17 January 2022; 20:30	France	29–25	Serbia	Pick Aréna, Szeged; Attendance: 4,038; Referees: Gatelis, Mažeika (LTU)
17 January 2022; 20:30	Mahé 6	(16–7)	Radivojević 7	Pick Aréna, Szeged; Attendance: 4,038; Referees: Gatelis, Mažeika (LTU)
17 January 2022; 20:30	1× (yellow card) 5× (suspension)	Report	2× (yellow card) 4× (suspension)	Pick Aréna, Szeged; Attendance: 4,038; Referees: Gatelis, Mažeika (LTU)

=== Group D ===
Pos	Team	Pld	W	D	L	GF	GA	GD	Pts	Qualification
1	Germany	3	3	0	0	97	81	+16	6	Main round
2	Poland	3	2	0	1	88	81	+7	4	Main round
3	Belarus	3	1	0	2	78	88	−10	2	
4	Austria	3	0	0	3	86	99	−13	0	

Source: EHF
Rules for classification: 1) points; 2) head-to-head points; 3) head-to-head goal difference; 4) head-to-head number of goals scored; 5) goal difference.

14 January 2022; 18:00	Germany	33–29	Belarus	Ondrej Nepela Arena, Bratislava; Attendance: 1,271; Referees: Lah, Sok (SLO)
14 January 2022; 18:00	Häfner, Schiller 8	(17–18)	Kulesh, Vailupau 7	Ondrej Nepela Arena, Bratislava; Attendance: 1,271; Referees: Lah, Sok (SLO)
14 January 2022; 18:00	1× (yellow card) 5× (suspension) 1× (red card)	Report	1× (yellow card) 5× (suspension) 1× (red card)	Ondrej Nepela Arena, Bratislava; Attendance: 1,271; Referees: Lah, Sok (SLO)

14 January 2022; 20:30	Austria	31–36	Poland	Ondrej Nepela Arena, Bratislava; Attendance: 1,530; Referees: Hansen, Madsen (DEN)
14 January 2022; 20:30	Frimmel 8	(14–17)	Moryto 9	Ondrej Nepela Arena, Bratislava; Attendance: 1,530; Referees: Hansen, Madsen (DEN)
14 January 2022; 20:30	5× (suspension)	Report	2× (suspension) 1× (red card)	Ondrej Nepela Arena, Bratislava; Attendance: 1,530; Referees: Hansen, Madsen (DEN)

16 January 2022; 18:00	Germany	34–29	Austria	Ondrej Nepela Arena, Bratislava; Attendance: 1,485; Referees: Gubica, Milošević (CRO)
16 January 2022; 18:00	Kastening 9	(15–16)	Frimmel 9	Ondrej Nepela Arena, Bratislava; Attendance: 1,485; Referees: Gubica, Milošević (CRO)
16 January 2022; 18:00	4× (suspension)	Report	4× (suspension)	Ondrej Nepela Arena, Bratislava; Attendance: 1,485; Referees: Gubica, Milošević (CRO)

16 January 2022; 20:30	Belarus	20–29	Poland	Ondrej Nepela Arena, Bratislava; Attendance: 2,500; Referees: Bonaventura, Bonaventura (FRA)
16 January 2022; 20:30	Vailupau 5	(11–14)	Krajewski 7	Ondrej Nepela Arena, Bratislava; Attendance: 2,500; Referees: Bonaventura, Bonaventura (FRA)
16 January 2022; 20:30	4× (suspension) 1×	Report	1× (yellow card) 1× (suspension)	Ondrej Nepela Arena, Bratislava; Attendance: 2,500; Referees: Bonaventura, Bonaventura (FRA)

18 January 2022; 18:00	Poland	23–30	Germany	Ondrej Nepela Arena, Bratislava; Attendance: 1,076; Referees: Nikolov, Nachevski (MKD)
18 January 2022; 18:00	Moryto 7	(12–15)	Steinert 9	Ondrej Nepela Arena, Bratislava; Attendance: 1,076; Referees: Nikolov, Nachevski (MKD)
18 January 2022; 18:00	1× (yellow card) 5× (suspension)	Report	1× (yellow card) 6× (suspension)	Ondrej Nepela Arena, Bratislava; Attendance: 1,076; Referees: Nikolov, Nachevski (MKD)

18 January 2022; 20:30	Belarus	29–26	Austria	Ondrej Nepela Arena, Bratislava; Attendance: 835; Referees: Mandák, Rudinský (SVK)
18 January 2022; 20:30	Vailupau 8	(16–16)	Bozovic 7	Ondrej Nepela Arena, Bratislava; Attendance: 835; Referees: Mandák, Rudinský (SVK)
18 January 2022; 20:30	1× (yellow card) 2× (suspension)	Report	1× (yellow card) 5× (suspension)	Ondrej Nepela Arena, Bratislava; Attendance: 835; Referees: Mandák, Rudinský (SVK)

=== Group E ===
Pos	Team	Pld	W	D	L	GF	GA	GD	Pts	Qualification
1	Spain	3	3	0	0	88	78	+10	6	Main round
2	Sweden	3	1	1	1	85	77	+8	3 (Note: Czech Republic 27–27 Sweden)	Main round
3	Czech Republic	3	1	1	1	80	74	+6	3	
4	Bosnia and Herzegovina	3	0	0	3	61	85	−24	0	

Source: EHF
Rules for classification: 1) points; 2) head-to-head points; 3) head-to-head goal difference; 4) head-to-head number of goals scored; 5) goal difference.
Notes:

13 January 2022; 18:00	Spain	28–26	Czech Republic	Ondrej Nepela Arena, Bratislava; Attendance: 1,173; Referees: Pavićević, Ražnatović (MNE)
13 January 2022; 18:00	Gurbindo 6	(14–11)	Hrstka 6	Ondrej Nepela Arena, Bratislava; Attendance: 1,173; Referees: Pavićević, Ražnatović (MNE)
13 January 2022; 18:00	1× (yellow card) 2× (suspension)	Report	2× (yellow card) 7× (suspension)	Ondrej Nepela Arena, Bratislava; Attendance: 1,173; Referees: Pavićević, Ražnatović (MNE)

13 January 2022; 20:30	Sweden	30–18	Bosnia and Herzegovina	Ondrej Nepela Arena, Bratislava; Attendance: 1,268; Referees: Bíró, Kiss (HUN)
13 January 2022; 20:30	Wanne 6	(17–11)	S. Burić 4	Ondrej Nepela Arena, Bratislava; Attendance: 1,268; Referees: Bíró, Kiss (HUN)
13 January 2022; 20:30	1× (suspension)	Report	1× (yellow card) 4× (suspension)	Ondrej Nepela Arena, Bratislava; Attendance: 1,268; Referees: Bíró, Kiss (HUN)

15 January 2022; 18:00	Czech Republic	27–19	Bosnia and Herzegovina	Ondrej Nepela Arena, Bratislava; Attendance: 1,994; Referees: Bonaventura, Bonaventura (FRA)
15 January 2022; 18:00	Klíma 8	(12–9)	Hamidović 5	Ondrej Nepela Arena, Bratislava; Attendance: 1,994; Referees: Bonaventura, Bonaventura (FRA)
15 January 2022; 18:00	1× (yellow card) 4× (suspension)	Report	1× (yellow card) 5× (suspension)	Ondrej Nepela Arena, Bratislava; Attendance: 1,994; Referees: Bonaventura, Bonaventura (FRA)

15 January 2022; 20:30	Spain	32–28	Sweden	Ondrej Nepela Arena, Bratislava; Attendance: 2,159; Referees: Brunner, Salah (SUI)
15 January 2022; 20:30	Fernández 8	(17–14)	Wanne 8	Ondrej Nepela Arena, Bratislava; Attendance: 2,159; Referees: Brunner, Salah (SUI)
15 January 2022; 20:30	4× (suspension)	Report	1× (yellow card) 3× (suspension)	Ondrej Nepela Arena, Bratislava; Attendance: 2,159; Referees: Brunner, Salah (SUI)

17 January 2022; 18:00	Bosnia and Herzegovina	24–28	Spain	Ondrej Nepela Arena, Bratislava; Attendance: 1,162; Referees: Lah, Sok (SLO)
17 January 2022; 18:00	Karačić 6	(14–12)	Casado 7	Ondrej Nepela Arena, Bratislava; Attendance: 1,162; Referees: Lah, Sok (SLO)
17 January 2022; 18:00	6× (suspension)	Report	2× (yellow card) 2× (suspension)	Ondrej Nepela Arena, Bratislava; Attendance: 1,162; Referees: Lah, Sok (SLO)

17 January 2022; 20:30	Czech Republic	27–27	Sweden	Ondrej Nepela Arena, Bratislava; Attendance: 1,368; Referees: Gubica, Milošević (CRO)
17 January 2022; 20:30	Babák, Piroch 5	(11–12)	Sandell, Wanne 5	Ondrej Nepela Arena, Bratislava; Attendance: 1,368; Referees: Gubica, Milošević (CRO)
17 January 2022; 20:30	1× (yellow card) 4× (suspension)	Report	1× (yellow card) 3× (suspension)	Ondrej Nepela Arena, Bratislava; Attendance: 1,368; Referees: Gubica, Milošević (CRO)

=== Group F ===
Pos	Team	Pld	W	D	L	GF	GA	GD	Pts	Qualification
1	Russia	3	3	0	0	88	76	+12	6	Main round
2	Norway	3	2	0	1	92	77	+15	4	Main round
3	Slovakia (H)	3	1	0	2	83	97	−14	2	
4	Lithuania	3	0	0	3	82	95	−13	0	

Source: EHF
Rules for classification: 1) points; 2) head-to-head points; 3) head-to-head goal difference; 4) head-to-head number of goals scored; 5) goal difference.
(H) Hosts

13 January 2022; 18:00	Russia	29–27	Lithuania	Steel Aréna, Košice; Attendance: 902; Referees: Elíasson, Pálsson (ISL)
13 January 2022; 18:00	Kosorotov 9	(14–9)	Malašinskas 5	Steel Aréna, Košice; Attendance: 902; Referees: Elíasson, Pálsson (ISL)
13 January 2022; 18:00	1× (yellow card) 6× (suspension)	Report	1× (yellow card) 3× (suspension)	Steel Aréna, Košice; Attendance: 902; Referees: Elíasson, Pálsson (ISL)

13 January 2022; 20:30	Norway	35–25	Slovakia	Steel Aréna, Košice; Attendance: 1,568; Referees: Brunner, Salah (SUI)
13 January 2022; 20:30	Toft 5	(15–11)	Urban 6	Steel Aréna, Košice; Attendance: 1,568; Referees: Brunner, Salah (SUI)
13 January 2022; 20:30	1× (yellow card) 5× (suspension)	Report	1× (yellow card) 2× (suspension)	Steel Aréna, Košice; Attendance: 1,568; Referees: Brunner, Salah (SUI)

15 January 2022; 18:00	Slovakia	31–26	Lithuania	Steel Aréna, Košice; Attendance: 1,504; Referees: Nikolov, Nachevski (MKD)
15 January 2022; 18:00	Urban 7	(15–8)	Malašinskas 8	Steel Aréna, Košice; Attendance: 1,504; Referees: Nikolov, Nachevski (MKD)
15 January 2022; 18:00	1× (yellow card) 8× (suspension) 1× (red card)	Report	4× (suspension)	Steel Aréna, Košice; Attendance: 1,504; Referees: Nikolov, Nachevski (MKD)

15 January 2022; 20:30	Norway	22–23	Russia	Steel Aréna, Košice; Attendance: 1,967; Referees: Pavićević, Ražnatović (MNE)
15 January 2022; 20:30	Barthold 7	(12–14)	Zhitnikov 7	Steel Aréna, Košice; Attendance: 1,967; Referees: Pavićević, Ražnatović (MNE)
15 January 2022; 20:30	3× (yellow card) 4× (suspension)	Report	1× (yellow card) 4× (suspension)	Steel Aréna, Košice; Attendance: 1,967; Referees: Pavićević, Ražnatović (MNE)

17 January 2022; 18:00	Slovakia	27–36	Russia	Steel Aréna, Košice; Attendance: 1,290; Referees: Hansen, Madsen (DEN)
17 January 2022; 18:00	Prokop 8	(9–19)	Kosorotov 7	Steel Aréna, Košice; Attendance: 1,290; Referees: Hansen, Madsen (DEN)
17 January 2022; 18:00	4× (suspension)	Report		Steel Aréna, Košice; Attendance: 1,290; Referees: Hansen, Madsen (DEN)

17 January 2022; 20:30	Lithuania	29–35	Norway	Steel Aréna, Košice; Attendance: 1,705; Referees: Bíró, Kiss (HUN)
17 January 2022; 20:30	Malašinskas 8	(16–16)	Barthold, Sagosen 7	Steel Aréna, Košice; Attendance: 1,705; Referees: Bíró, Kiss (HUN)
17 January 2022; 20:30	5× (suspension)	Report	2× (suspension)	Steel Aréna, Košice; Attendance: 1,705; Referees: Bíró, Kiss (HUN)

== Main round ==
Points and goals gained in the preliminary group against teams that advanced were transferred to the main round.

=== Group I ===
Pos	Team	Pld	W	D	L	GF	GA	GD	Pts	Qualification
1	France	5	4	0	1	148	131	+17	8 (Note: Denmark 29–30 France)	Semifinals
2	Denmark	5	4	0	1	149	123	+26	8	Semifinals
3	Iceland	5	3	0	2	138	124	+14	6	Fifth place game
4	Croatia	5	1	1	3	124	136	−12	3 (Note: Netherlands 28–28 Croatia, goal difference: Croatia −12 and Netherlands −19)	
5	Netherlands	5	1	1	3	137	156	−19	3	
6	Montenegro	5	1	0	4	134	160	−26	2	

Updated to match(es) played on 26 January 2022. Source: EHF
Rules for classification: 1) points; 2) head-to-head points; 3) head-to-head goal difference; 4) head-to-head number of goals scored; 5) goal difference.
Notes:

20 January 2022; 15:30	Montenegro	32–26	Croatia	MVM Dome, Budapest; Attendance: 5,037; Referees: Jørum, Kleven (NOR)
20 January 2022; 15:30	B. Vujović, M. Vujović 7	(15–9)	Čupić 7	MVM Dome, Budapest; Attendance: 5,037; Referees: Jørum, Kleven (NOR)
20 January 2022; 15:30	6× (suspension)	Report	3× (suspension)	MVM Dome, Budapest; Attendance: 5,037; Referees: Jørum, Kleven (NOR)

20 January 2022; 18:00	France	34–24	Netherlands	MVM Dome, Budapest; Attendance: 5,055; Referees: Schulze, Tönnies (GER)
20 January 2022; 18:00	Minne 8	(15–12)	Baijens, Smits 4	MVM Dome, Budapest; Attendance: 5,055; Referees: Schulze, Tönnies (GER)
20 January 2022; 18:00	1× (yellow card) 6× (suspension)	Report	1× (yellow card) 4× (suspension)	MVM Dome, Budapest; Attendance: 5,055; Referees: Schulze, Tönnies (GER)

20 January 2022; 20:30	Denmark	28–24	Iceland	MVM Dome, Budapest; Attendance: 5,060; Referees: Kurtagic, Wetterwik (SWE)
20 January 2022; 20:30	Gidsel 9	(17–14)	Magnússon 8	MVM Dome, Budapest; Attendance: 5,060; Referees: Kurtagic, Wetterwik (SWE)
20 January 2022; 20:30	1× (yellow card) 4× (suspension)	Report	1× (yellow card) 6× (suspension)	MVM Dome, Budapest; Attendance: 5,060; Referees: Kurtagic, Wetterwik (SWE)

22 January 2022; 15:30	Montenegro	30–34	Netherlands	MVM Dome, Budapest; Attendance: 11,360; Referees: Horáček, Novotný (CZE)
22 January 2022; 15:30	Čepić, B. Vujović 6	(16–18)	Smits 9	MVM Dome, Budapest; Attendance: 11,360; Referees: Horáček, Novotný (CZE)
22 January 2022; 15:30	3× (suspension)	Report	5× (suspension)	MVM Dome, Budapest; Attendance: 11,360; Referees: Horáček, Novotný (CZE)

22 January 2022; 18:00	France	21–29	Iceland	MVM Dome, Budapest; Attendance: 11,394; Referees: Nikolov, Nachevski (MKD)
22 January 2022; 18:00	three players 5	(10–17)	Magnússon 10	MVM Dome, Budapest; Attendance: 11,394; Referees: Nikolov, Nachevski (MKD)
22 January 2022; 18:00	1× (yellow card) 4× (suspension)	Report	1× (yellow card) 3× (suspension)	MVM Dome, Budapest; Attendance: 11,394; Referees: Nikolov, Nachevski (MKD)

22 January 2022; 20:30	Denmark	27–25	Croatia	MVM Dome, Budapest; Attendance: 11,412; Referees: Marín, García (ESP)
22 January 2022; 20:30	M. Hansen 8	(12–11)	Marić 8	MVM Dome, Budapest; Attendance: 11,412; Referees: Marín, García (ESP)
22 January 2022; 20:30	1× (suspension)	Report	2× (yellow card) 4× (suspension)	MVM Dome, Budapest; Attendance: 11,412; Referees: Marín, García (ESP)

24 January 2022; 15:30	Iceland	22–23	Croatia	MVM Dome, Budapest; Attendance: 4,522; Referees: Schulze, Tönnies (GER)
24 January 2022; 15:30	Thorkelsson 6	(12–10)	Lučin 6	MVM Dome, Budapest; Attendance: 4,522; Referees: Schulze, Tönnies (GER)
24 January 2022; 15:30	1× (yellow card) 2× (suspension)	Report	1× (yellow card) 3× (suspension)	MVM Dome, Budapest; Attendance: 4,522; Referees: Schulze, Tönnies (GER)

24 January 2022; 18:00	Denmark	35–23	Netherlands	MVM Dome, Budapest; Attendance: 4,557; Referees: Nikolov, Nachevski (MKD)
24 January 2022; 18:00	Gidsel 9	(21–12)	Baijens 6	MVM Dome, Budapest; Attendance: 4,557; Referees: Nikolov, Nachevski (MKD)
24 January 2022; 18:00	1× (yellow card) 1× (suspension)	Report	3× (suspension)	MVM Dome, Budapest; Attendance: 4,557; Referees: Nikolov, Nachevski (MKD)

24 January 2022; 20:30	Montenegro	27–36	France	MVM Dome, Budapest; Attendance: 4,582; Referees: Kurtagic, Wetterwik (SWE)
24 January 2022; 20:30	M. Vujović 7	(12–16)	Mem 7	MVM Dome, Budapest; Attendance: 4,582; Referees: Kurtagic, Wetterwik (SWE)
24 January 2022; 20:30	1× (suspension) 1× (red card)	Report	1× (yellow card) 3× (suspension) 1× (red card)	MVM Dome, Budapest; Attendance: 4,582; Referees: Kurtagic, Wetterwik (SWE)

26 January 2022; 15:30	Montenegro	24–34	Iceland	MVM Dome, Budapest; Attendance: 5,200; Referees: Marín, García (ESP)
26 January 2022; 15:30	M. Vujović 11	(8–17)	Magnússon 11	MVM Dome, Budapest; Attendance: 5,200; Referees: Marín, García (ESP)
26 January 2022; 15:30	4× (suspension)	Report	1× (yellow card) 2× (suspension)	MVM Dome, Budapest; Attendance: 5,200; Referees: Marín, García (ESP)

26 January 2022; 18:00	Netherlands	28–28	Croatia	MVM Dome, Budapest; Attendance: 5,275; Referees: Kurtagic, Wetterwik (SWE)
26 January 2022; 18:00	Steins 6	(15–13)	Martinović 12	MVM Dome, Budapest; Attendance: 5,275; Referees: Kurtagic, Wetterwik (SWE)
26 January 2022; 18:00	3× (suspension)	Report	1× (yellow card) 3× (suspension) 1× (red card)	MVM Dome, Budapest; Attendance: 5,275; Referees: Kurtagic, Wetterwik (SWE)

26 January 2022; 20:30	Denmark	29–30	France	MVM Dome, Budapest; Attendance: 5,315; Referees: Horáček, Novotný (CZE)
26 January 2022; 20:30	Kirkeløkke 10	(17–12)	Descat, Mem 8	MVM Dome, Budapest; Attendance: 5,315; Referees: Horáček, Novotný (CZE)
26 January 2022; 20:30	3× (suspension)	Report	4× (suspension) 1× (red card)	MVM Dome, Budapest; Attendance: 5,315; Referees: Horáček, Novotný (CZE)

=== Group II ===
Pos	Team	Pld	W	D	L	GF	GA	GD	Pts	Qualification
1	Spain	5	4	0	1	138	130	+8	8 (Note: Spain 32–28 Sweden)	Semifinals
2	Sweden	5	4	0	1	134	117	+17	8	Semifinals
3	Norway	5	3	0	2	142	124	+18	6	Fifth place game
4	Germany	5	2	0	3	127	134	−7	4	
5	Russia	5	1	1	3	129	136	−7	3	
6	Poland	5	0	1	4	128	157	−29	1	

Source: EHF
Rules for classification: 1) points; 2) head-to-head points; 3) head-to-head goal difference; 4) head-to-head number of goals scored; 5) goal difference.
Notes:

20 January 2022; 15:30	Russia	23–29	Sweden	Ondrej Nepela Arena, Bratislava; Attendance: 1,667; Referees: Lah, Sok (SLO)
20 January 2022; 15:30	Ermakov 5	(13–16)	Wanne 9	Ondrej Nepela Arena, Bratislava; Attendance: 1,667; Referees: Lah, Sok (SLO)
20 January 2022; 15:30	1× (yellow card) 3× (suspension)	Report	1× (suspension)	Ondrej Nepela Arena, Bratislava; Attendance: 1,667; Referees: Lah, Sok (SLO)

20 January 2022; 18:00	Germany	23–29	Spain	Ondrej Nepela Arena, Bratislava; Attendance: 1,683; Referees: Bonaventura, Bonaventura (FRA)
20 January 2022; 18:00	Golla, Zieker 4	(12–14)	Maqueda 6	Ondrej Nepela Arena, Bratislava; Attendance: 1,683; Referees: Bonaventura, Bonaventura (FRA)
20 January 2022; 18:00	1× (suspension)	Report		Ondrej Nepela Arena, Bratislava; Attendance: 1,683; Referees: Bonaventura, Bonaventura (FRA)

20 January 2022; 20:30	Poland	31–42	Norway	Ondrej Nepela Arena, Bratislava; Attendance: 1,682; Referees: Brunner, Salah (SUI)
20 January 2022; 20:30	Moryto 10	(15–21)	Barthold 10	Ondrej Nepela Arena, Bratislava; Attendance: 1,682; Referees: Brunner, Salah (SUI)
20 January 2022; 20:30	1× (yellow card) 3× (suspension)	Report	1× (yellow card) 6× (suspension)	Ondrej Nepela Arena, Bratislava; Attendance: 1,682; Referees: Brunner, Salah (SUI)

21 January 2022; 15:30	Russia	25–26	Spain	Ondrej Nepela Arena, Bratislava; Attendance: 2,021; Referees: Hansen, Madsen (DEN)
21 January 2022; 15:30	Santalov 6	(11–12)	Casado 7	Ondrej Nepela Arena, Bratislava; Attendance: 2,021; Referees: Hansen, Madsen (DEN)
21 January 2022; 15:30	1× (suspension)	Report		Ondrej Nepela Arena, Bratislava; Attendance: 2,021; Referees: Hansen, Madsen (DEN)

21 January 2022; 18:00	Poland	18–28	Sweden	Ondrej Nepela Arena, Bratislava; Attendance: 2,021; Referees: Pavićević, Ražnatović (MNE)
21 January 2022; 18:00	Krajewski, Moryto 5	(6–14)	three players 4	Ondrej Nepela Arena, Bratislava; Attendance: 2,021; Referees: Pavićević, Ražnatović (MNE)
21 January 2022; 18:00	3× (suspension)	Report	1× (yellow card) 2× (suspension)	Ondrej Nepela Arena, Bratislava; Attendance: 2,021; Referees: Pavićević, Ražnatović (MNE)

21 January 2022; 20:30	Germany	23–28	Norway	Ondrej Nepela Arena, Bratislava; Attendance: 2,021; Referees: Lah, Sok (SLO)
21 January 2022; 20:30	Golla 4	(12–14)	Toft 7	Ondrej Nepela Arena, Bratislava; Attendance: 2,021; Referees: Lah, Sok (SLO)
21 January 2022; 20:30	1× (yellow card) 2× (suspension)	Report	3× (suspension)	Ondrej Nepela Arena, Bratislava; Attendance: 2,021; Referees: Lah, Sok (SLO)

23 January 2022; 15:30	Poland	29–29	Russia	Ondrej Nepela Arena, Bratislava; Attendance: 1,984; Referees: Bonaventura, Bonaventura (FRA)
23 January 2022; 15:30	Sićko 8	(13–12)	Kosorotov 8	Ondrej Nepela Arena, Bratislava; Attendance: 1,984; Referees: Bonaventura, Bonaventura (FRA)
23 January 2022; 15:30	1× (yellow card) 5× (suspension)	Report	1× (yellow card) 5× (suspension) 1× (red card)	Ondrej Nepela Arena, Bratislava; Attendance: 1,984; Referees: Bonaventura, Bonaventura (FRA)

23 January 2022; 18:00	Germany	21–25	Sweden	Ondrej Nepela Arena, Bratislava; Attendance: 1,992; Referees: Brunner, Salah (SUI)
23 January 2022; 18:00	Köster 4	(10–12)	Wanne 6	Ondrej Nepela Arena, Bratislava; Attendance: 1,992; Referees: Brunner, Salah (SUI)
23 January 2022; 18:00	2× (suspension)	Report	2× (suspension)	Ondrej Nepela Arena, Bratislava; Attendance: 1,992; Referees: Brunner, Salah (SUI)

23 January 2022; 20:30	Spain	23–27	Norway	Ondrej Nepela Arena, Bratislava; Attendance: 1,992; Referees: Pavićević, Ražnatović (MNE)
23 January 2022; 20:30	Maqueda 6	(11–14)	Barthold 6	Ondrej Nepela Arena, Bratislava; Attendance: 1,992; Referees: Pavićević, Ražnatović (MNE)
23 January 2022; 20:30	2× (suspension)	Report	6× (suspension) 1× (red card)	Ondrej Nepela Arena, Bratislava; Attendance: 1,992; Referees: Pavićević, Ražnatović (MNE)

25 January 2022; 15:30	Poland	27–28	Spain	Ondrej Nepela Arena, Bratislava; Attendance: 1,432; Referees: Lah, Sok (SLO)
25 January 2022; 15:30	Moryto 6	(13–14)	three players 4	Ondrej Nepela Arena, Bratislava; Attendance: 1,432; Referees: Lah, Sok (SLO)
25 January 2022; 15:30	2× (yellow card) 1× (suspension)	Report	1× (suspension)	Ondrej Nepela Arena, Bratislava; Attendance: 1,432; Referees: Lah, Sok (SLO)

25 January 2022; 18:00	Germany	30–29	Russia	Ondrej Nepela Arena, Bratislava; Attendance: 1,443; Referees: Pavićević, Ražnatović (MNE)
25 January 2022; 18:00	three players 5	(16–12)	Kosorotov 8	Ondrej Nepela Arena, Bratislava; Attendance: 1,443; Referees: Pavićević, Ražnatović (MNE)
25 January 2022; 18:00	1× (yellow card) 2× (suspension)	Report	3× (suspension)	Ondrej Nepela Arena, Bratislava; Attendance: 1,443; Referees: Pavićević, Ražnatović (MNE)

25 January 2022; 20:30	Sweden	24–23	Norway	Ondrej Nepela Arena, Bratislava; Attendance: 1,448; Referees: Hansen, Madsen (DEN)
25 January 2022; 20:30	Chrintz 6	(9–14)	Reinkind 6	Ondrej Nepela Arena, Bratislava; Attendance: 1,448; Referees: Hansen, Madsen (DEN)
25 January 2022; 20:30	3× (suspension)	Report	4× (suspension)	Ondrej Nepela Arena, Bratislava; Attendance: 1,448; Referees: Hansen, Madsen (DEN)

== Knockout stage ==
=== Bracket ===
Semi-finals
28 January
France	33
Sweden	34
28 January
Spain	29
Denmark	25

Final
30 January
Sweden	27
Spain	26
Third place
30 January
France	32
Denmark (ET)	35

=== Fifth place game ===
28 January 2022
15:30
Iceland
33–34 (ET)
Norway
MVM Dome, Budapest
Attendance: 7,165
Referees: Marín, García (ESP)
Magnússon 10
(12–16)
Sagosen 8
2× (yellow card) 4× (suspension)
Report
4× (suspension) 1× (red card)

FT: 27–27 ET: 6–7

=== Semifinals ===
28 January 2022; 18:15	Spain	29–25	Denmark	MVM Dome, Budapest; Attendance: 7,286; Referees: Nikolov, Nachevski (MKD)
28 January 2022; 18:15	Gómez 11	(13–14)	M. Hansen 8	MVM Dome, Budapest; Attendance: 7,286; Referees: Nikolov, Nachevski (MKD)
28 January 2022; 18:15	1× (yellow card) 4× (suspension)	Report	1× (yellow card) 3× (suspension)	MVM Dome, Budapest; Attendance: 7,286; Referees: Nikolov, Nachevski (MKD)

28 January 2022; 20:45	France	33–34	Sweden	MVM Dome, Budapest; Attendance: 7,306; Referees: Lah, Sok (SLO)
28 January 2022; 20:45	Descat, Minne 8	(14–17)	Gottfridsson 9	MVM Dome, Budapest; Attendance: 7,306; Referees: Lah, Sok (SLO)
28 January 2022; 20:45	1× (yellow card) 3× (suspension) 1× (red card)	Report	1× (yellow card) 4× (suspension)	MVM Dome, Budapest; Attendance: 7,306; Referees: Lah, Sok (SLO)

=== Third place game ===
30 January 2022
15:30
France
32–35 (ET)
Denmark
MVM Dome, Budapest
Attendance: 10,021
Referees: Horáček, Novotný (CZE)
Mahé 8
(14–13)
Holm 10
1× (yellow card) 4× (suspension)
Report
2× (suspension)

FT: 29–29 ET: 3–6

=== Final ===
30 January 2022; 18:15	Sweden	27–26	Spain	MVM Dome, Budapest; Attendance: 14,238; Referees: Schulze, Tönnies (GER)
30 January 2022; 18:15	Bergendahl, Ekberg 5	(12–13)	Figueras, Gómez 6	MVM Dome, Budapest; Attendance: 14,238; Referees: Schulze, Tönnies (GER)
30 January 2022; 18:15	2× (yellow card) 3× (suspension)	Report	4× (suspension)	MVM Dome, Budapest; Attendance: 14,238; Referees: Schulze, Tönnies (GER)

== Ranking and statistics ==
=== Final ranking ===
The teams ranked fourth in each group after the completion of the preliminary round matches were ranked 19 to 24, while teams ranked third in each group after the completion of the preliminary round matches were ranked 13 to 18 according to the number of points won in the preliminary round. Places seven and eight were attributed to the two teams ranked fourth in the groups, places nine and ten to the two teams ranked fifth in the groups and places eleven and twelve to the two teams ranked sixth in the group according to the number of points won by the respective teams after completion of the main round matches. Places five and six were decided by a play-off, and the top four places by knock-out.

Rank	Team	Qualification	
Rank	Team	WC	EC
1st place, gold medalist(s)	Sweden	Q	Q
2nd place, silver medalist(s)	Spain	Q	Q
3rd place, bronze medalist(s)	Denmark	Q	Q
4	France	Q	
5	Norway	Q	
6	Iceland	q2	
7	Germany	q2	Q
8	Croatia	q2	
9	Russia	q2	
10	Netherlands	q2	
11	Montenegro	q2	
12	Poland	Q	
13	Czech Republic	q2	
14	Serbia	q2	
15	Hungary	q2	
16	Slovenia	q1	
17	Belarus	q1	
18	Slovakia	q1	
19	Portugal	q1	
20	Austria	q1	
21	Lithuania	q1	
22	North Macedonia	q1	
23	Bosnia and Herzegovina	q1	
24	Ukraine	q1	

Entry stages

Q	Qualified directly to a main tournament
q2	Enters part 2 of qualification phase 2 (applied only for 2023 World Championship)
q1	Enters part 1 of qualification phase 2 (applied only for 2023 World Championship)

Method of qualification

Qualified for the phase indicated based on this tournament
Qualified for the tournament as a host nation
Qualified for the World Championship as defending title holder
Qualified for the 2023 World Championship as co-Host

=== All-Star team ===
The All-Star team and most valuable player were announced on 30 January 2022.

Position	Player
Most valuable player	(Sweden) Jim Gottfridsson
Best defender	(Sweden) Oscar Bergendahl
Goalkeeper	(Iceland) Viktor Gísli Hallgrímsson
Right wing	(Spain) Aleix Gómez
Right back	(Denmark) Mathias Gidsel
Centre back	(Netherlands) Luc Steins
Left back	(Denmark) Mikkel Hansen
Left wing	(Montenegro) Miloš Vujović
Pivot	(Germany) Johannes Golla

=== Statistics ===
==== Top goalscorers ====
Rank	Name	Goals	Shots	%
1	(Iceland) Ómar Ingi Magnússon	59	80	74
2	(Denmark) Mikkel Hansen	48	69	70
3	(Poland) Arkadiusz Moryto	47	62	76
4	(Netherlands) Kay Smits	45	62	73
4	(Sweden) Hampus Wanne	45	56	80
6	(France) Hugo Descat	44	58	76
7	(Norway) Sander Sagosen	43	71	61
8	(Norway) Sebastian Barthold	42	54	78
9	(Spain) Aleix Gómez	41	54	76
9	(Montenegro) Miloš Vujović	41	57	72

==== Top goalkeepers ====
Rank	Name	%	Saves	Shots
1	(Denmark) Kevin Møller	40	42	104
2	(Serbia) Milan Bomastar	39	9	23
3	(Serbia) Vladimir Cupara	34	24	70
3	(Russia) Viktor Kireyev	34	73	216
3	(Czech Republic) Tomáš Mrkva	34	36	106
6	(Denmark) Niklas Landin Jacobsen	33	76	232
6	(North Macedonia) Nikola Mitrevski	33	16	48
8	(Norway) Torbjørn Bergerud	32	36	111
8	(France) Vincent Gérard	32	79	248
8	(Spain) Gonzalo Pérez de Vargas	32	60	186
8	(Belarus) Ilya Usik	32	16	50
