= Wadaiko Yamato =

Japanese taiko drummer group

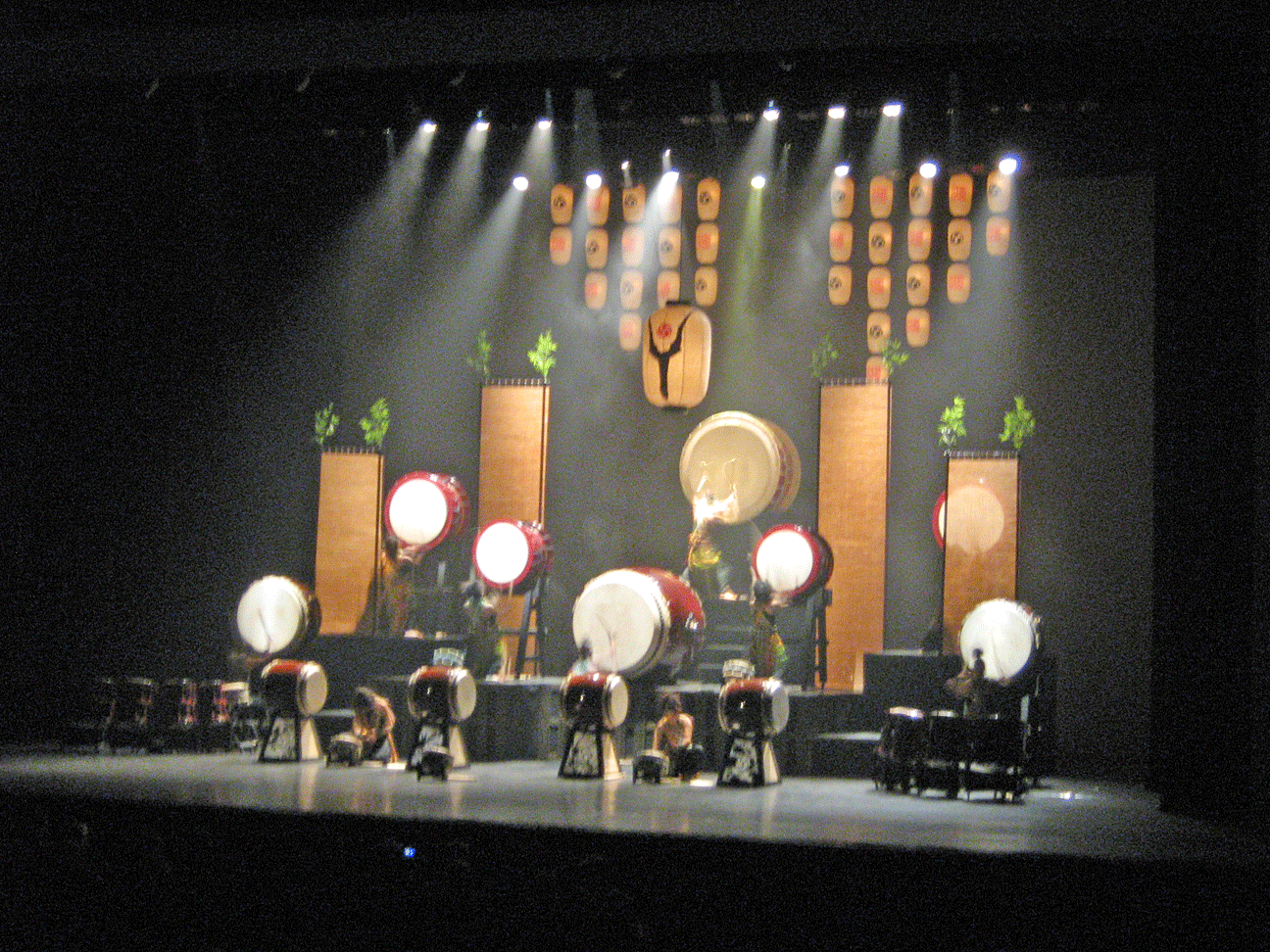
- Wadaiko Yamato live at Sava Centar in 2010. Yamato Matsuri Fiesta

Background information
- Also known as: Yamato
- Origin: Asuka, Nara, Japan
- Genre: Taiko
- Years active: 1993–present
- Website: www.yamato.jp

Wadaiko Yamato 和太鼓倭, sometimes known as Yamato Drummers, is a Japanese musical ensemble of taiko drummers founded in 1993 by Masa Ogawa. In Japanese, the word 和太鼓 (wadaiko) translates as "Japanese drum" and Yamato was the former name of the city of Nara, where the group was founded.

== History ==
Wadaiko Yamato was first formed in 1993 and has featured a slowly evolving lineup of drummers and percussionists over the years, with up to 20 members at any time playing taiko drums in a variety of sizes. The drums range in size from small handheld specimens to some that are up to two meters in diameter. Some compositions are accompanied by traditional Japanese flutes and guitars.

Founder Masa Ogawa had played the taiko drum since discovering one in a shrine as a child. Their performances are enhanced with martial arts-inspired choreography, along with traditional Japanese fashions and stage designs. Performances also include drum battles between individual members of the ensemble.

The group began touring internationally in 1998 and has played more than 4,000 concerts in more than 50 countries. In 1998 they won the "Spirit of the Fringe" award at Edinburgh Festival Fringe in Scotland. They have also released several live concert recordings. The group continues to tour internationally into the 2020s.
