= 2022–23 EHF Champions League group stage =

The 2022–23 EHF Champions League group stage was played between 14 September 2022 and 2 March 2023 to determine the twelve teams advancing to the knockout stage of the 2022–23 EHF Champions League.

== Draw ==
The draw was held on 1 July 2022 in Vienna, Austria.

=== Seeding ===
The composition of the seeding pots for the group stage draw was announced on 28 June 2022. From each pot, two teams were drawn into Group A and the other two in Group B. Teams from the same national association will not drawn into the same group.

Pot 1	Pot 2	Pot 3	Pot 4
(Spain) Barça (Germany) SC Magdeburg (France) Paris Saint-Germain (Hungary) OTP Bank - Pick Szeged	(Denmark) GOG Håndbold (Poland) Barlinek Industria Kielce (Portugal) FC Porto (Slovenia) Celje Pivovarna Laško	(Romania) Dinamo București (Germany) THW Kiel (France) HBC Nantes (Hungary) Telekom Veszprém	(Norway) Elverum Håndball (Croatia) PPD Zagreb (Denmark) Aalborg Håndbold (Poland) Orlen Wisła Płock

== Format ==
In each group, teams played against each other in a double round-robin format, with home and away matches.

== Tiebreakers ==
In the group stage, teams were ranked according to points (2 points for a win, 1 point for a draw, 0 points for a loss). After completion of the group stage, if two or more teams have the same number of points, the ranking was determined as follows:

1. Highest number of points in matches between the teams directly involved;
2. Superior goal difference in matches between the teams directly involved;
3. Highest number of goals scored in matches between the teams directly involved;
4. Superior goal difference in all matches of the group;
5. Highest number of plus goals in all matches of the group;

If the ranking of one of these teams is determined, the above criteria are consecutively followed until the ranking of all teams is determined. If no ranking can be determined, a decision shall be obtained by EHF through drawing of lots.

== Groups ==
The matchdays were 14–15 September, 21–22 September, 28–29 September, 5–6 October, 26–27 October, 2–3 November, 23–24 November, 30 November – 1 December, 7–8 December, 14–15 December 2022, 8–9 February, 15–16 February, 22–23 February, and 1–2 March 2023.

Times until 29 October 2022 are UTC+2, from 30 October 2022 on UTC+1.

=== Group A ===
Pos	Team	Pld	W	D	L	GF	GA	GD	Pts	Qualification
1	(France) Paris Saint-Germain	14	12	0	2	492	439	+53	24	Quarterfinals
2	(Germany) SC Magdeburg	14	9	2	3	453	419	+34	20	Quarterfinals
3	(Hungary) Telekom Veszprém	14	8	2	4	449	429	+20	18	Playoffs
4	(Denmark) GOG Håndbold	14	7	1	6	459	454	+5	15	Playoffs
5	(Romania) Dinamo București	14	5	3	6	416	429	−13	13	Playoffs
6	(Poland) Orlen Wisła Płock	14	4	1	9	374	412	−38	9	Playoffs
7	(Croatia) PPD Zagreb	14	3	2	9	390	420	−30	8	
8	(Portugal) FC Porto	14	2	1	11	407	438	−31	5	

Source: EHF
Rules for classification: Tiebreakers

14 September 2022; 20:45	PPD Zagreb (Croatia)	27–31	(Denmark) GOG Håndbold	Arena Zagreb, Zagreb; Attendance: 450; Referees: Brunner, Salah (SUI)
14 September 2022; 20:45	Čupić, Leimeter 5	(12–18)	Jørgensen, Tollbring 5	Arena Zagreb, Zagreb; Attendance: 450; Referees: Brunner, Salah (SUI)
14 September 2022; 20:45	2× (suspension)	Report	4× (suspension)	Arena Zagreb, Zagreb; Attendance: 450; Referees: Brunner, Salah (SUI)

15 September 2022; 18:45	Dinamo București (Romania)	28–30	(Germany) SC Magdeburg	Polyvalent Hall, Bucharest; Attendance: 3,500; Referees: Santos, Fonseca (POR)
15 September 2022; 18:45	Kuduz 6	(16–16)	Magnússon 6	Polyvalent Hall, Bucharest; Attendance: 3,500; Referees: Santos, Fonseca (POR)
15 September 2022; 18:45	3× (suspension)	Report	2× (suspension)	Polyvalent Hall, Bucharest; Attendance: 3,500; Referees: Santos, Fonseca (POR)

15 September 2022; 18:45	Telekom Veszprém (Hungary)	36–34	(France) Paris Saint-Germain	Veszprém Aréna, Veszprém; Attendance: 5,140; Referees: Marín, García (ESP)
15 September 2022; 18:45	Lauge 11	(17–17)	Krištopāns 7	Veszprém Aréna, Veszprém; Attendance: 5,140; Referees: Marín, García (ESP)
15 September 2022; 18:45	1× (yellow card) 5× (suspension)	Report	1× (yellow card) 2× (suspension)	Veszprém Aréna, Veszprém; Attendance: 5,140; Referees: Marín, García (ESP)

15 September 2022; 20:45	Orlen Wisła Płock (Poland)	27–23	(Portugal) FC Porto	Orlen Arena, Płock; Attendance: 3,000; Referees: Schulze, Tönnies (GER)
15 September 2022; 20:45	Pérez Arce 7	(14–10)	Oliveira 5	Orlen Arena, Płock; Attendance: 3,000; Referees: Schulze, Tönnies (GER)
15 September 2022; 20:45	1× (yellow card) 4× (suspension)	Report	2× (yellow card) 5× (suspension) 1× (red card)	Orlen Arena, Płock; Attendance: 3,000; Referees: Schulze, Tönnies (GER)

21 September 2022; 20:45	Paris Saint-Germain (France)	37–33	(Poland) Orlen Wisła Płock	Stade Pierre de Coubertin, Paris; Attendance: 2,400; Referees: Hansen, Madsen (DEN)
21 September 2022; 20:45	Syprzak 9	(18–16)	Kosorotov 8	Stade Pierre de Coubertin, Paris; Attendance: 2,400; Referees: Hansen, Madsen (DEN)
21 September 2022; 20:45	1× (yellow card) 4× (suspension)	Report	1× (suspension)	Stade Pierre de Coubertin, Paris; Attendance: 2,400; Referees: Hansen, Madsen (DEN)

21 September 2022; 20:45	FC Porto (Portugal)	28–35	(Hungary) Telekom Veszprém	Dragão Arena, Porto; Attendance: 1,100; Referees: Bonaventura, Bonaventura (FRA)
21 September 2022; 20:45	Thurin 6	(12–16)	Nenadić 7	Dragão Arena, Porto; Attendance: 1,100; Referees: Bonaventura, Bonaventura (FRA)
21 September 2022; 20:45	1× (yellow card) 3× (suspension) 1× (red card)	Report	2× (suspension)	Dragão Arena, Porto; Attendance: 1,100; Referees: Bonaventura, Bonaventura (FRA)

22 September 2022; 18:45	GOG Håndbold (Denmark)	38–38	(Romania) Dinamo București	Arena Fyn, Odense; Attendance: 4,000; Referees: Gasmi, Gasmi (FRA)
22 September 2022; 18:45	Madsen 10	(21–20)	Akimenko 7	Arena Fyn, Odense; Attendance: 4,000; Referees: Gasmi, Gasmi (FRA)
22 September 2022; 18:45	1× (yellow card) 3× (suspension)	Report	1× (yellow card) 2× (suspension)	Arena Fyn, Odense; Attendance: 4,000; Referees: Gasmi, Gasmi (FRA)

22 September 2022; 20:45	SC Magdeburg (Germany)	35–25	(Croatia) PPD Zagreb	GETEC Arena, Magdeburg; Attendance: 3,582; Referees: Jørum, Kleven (NOR)
22 September 2022; 20:45	Hornke 11	(17–12)	Leimeter 5	GETEC Arena, Magdeburg; Attendance: 3,582; Referees: Jørum, Kleven (NOR)
22 September 2022; 20:45	5× (suspension)	Report	5× (suspension)	GETEC Arena, Magdeburg; Attendance: 3,582; Referees: Jørum, Kleven (NOR)

28 September 2022; 18:45	Telekom Veszprém (Hungary)	33–30	(Romania) Dinamo București	Veszprém Aréna, Veszprém; Attendance: 4,100; Referees: Brunner, Salah (SUI)
28 September 2022; 18:45	three players 5	(15–17)	Akimenko, Kašpárek 7	Veszprém Aréna, Veszprém; Attendance: 4,100; Referees: Brunner, Salah (SUI)
28 September 2022; 18:45	1× (yellow card) 3× (suspension)	Report	2× (yellow card) 4× (suspension)	Veszprém Aréna, Veszprém; Attendance: 4,100; Referees: Brunner, Salah (SUI)

28 September 2022; 18:45	PPD Zagreb (Croatia)	29–23	(Portugal) FC Porto	Arena Zagreb, Zagreb; Attendance: 1,300; Referees: Horáček, Novotný (CZE)
28 September 2022; 18:45	Dibirov 10	(16–15)	four players 3	Arena Zagreb, Zagreb; Attendance: 1,300; Referees: Horáček, Novotný (CZE)
28 September 2022; 18:45	5× (suspension)	Report	1× (yellow card) 3× (suspension)	Arena Zagreb, Zagreb; Attendance: 1,300; Referees: Horáček, Novotný (CZE)

28 September 2022; 20:45	SC Magdeburg (Germany)	22–29	(France) Paris Saint-Germain	GETEC Arena, Magdeburg; Attendance: 6,012; Referees: Lah, Sok (SLO)
28 September 2022; 20:45	Weber 7	(10–18)	four players 5	GETEC Arena, Magdeburg; Attendance: 6,012; Referees: Lah, Sok (SLO)
28 September 2022; 20:45	2× (yellow card) 3× (suspension)	Report	1× (yellow card) 5× (suspension)	GETEC Arena, Magdeburg; Attendance: 6,012; Referees: Lah, Sok (SLO)

29 September 2022; 18:45	Orlen Wisła Płock (Poland)	31–27	(Denmark) GOG Håndbold	Orlen Arena, Płock; Attendance: 2,600; Referees: Marín, García (ESP)
29 September 2022; 18:45	Lučin 7	(17–14)	Tollbring 7	Orlen Arena, Płock; Attendance: 2,600; Referees: Marín, García (ESP)
29 September 2022; 18:45	1× (yellow card) 6× (suspension)	Report	2× (yellow card) 4× (suspension)	Orlen Arena, Płock; Attendance: 2,600; Referees: Marín, García (ESP)

5 October 2022; 18:45	Dinamo București (Romania)	32–27	(Portugal) FC Porto	Polyvalent Hall, Bucharest; Attendance: 4,000; Referees: Hansen, Madsen (DEN)
5 October 2022; 18:45	Zein 10	(13–12)	Thurin 8	Polyvalent Hall, Bucharest; Attendance: 4,000; Referees: Hansen, Madsen (DEN)
5 October 2022; 18:45	1× (suspension)	Report	4× (suspension)	Polyvalent Hall, Bucharest; Attendance: 4,000; Referees: Hansen, Madsen (DEN)

5 October 2022; 20:45	GOG Håndbold (Denmark)	30–31	(Hungary) Telekom Veszprém	Arena Fyn, Odense; Attendance: 3,120; Referees: Mažeika, Gatelis (LTU)
5 October 2022; 20:45	Olsen 7	(14–16)	Mahé 8	Arena Fyn, Odense; Attendance: 3,120; Referees: Mažeika, Gatelis (LTU)
5 October 2022; 20:45	2× (yellow card) 2× (suspension)	Report	2× (yellow card) 4× (suspension) 1× (red card)	Arena Fyn, Odense; Attendance: 3,120; Referees: Mažeika, Gatelis (LTU)

6 October 2022; 18:45	SC Magdeburg (Germany)	33–27	(Poland) Orlen Wisła Płock	GETEC Arena, Magdeburg; Attendance: 3,935; Referees: Nikolov, Nachevski (MKD)
6 October 2022; 18:45	Kristjánsson, Smits 8	(17–16)	Mihić 8	GETEC Arena, Magdeburg; Attendance: 3,935; Referees: Nikolov, Nachevski (MKD)
6 October 2022; 18:45	2× (suspension)	Report	1× (yellow card) 2× (suspension)	GETEC Arena, Magdeburg; Attendance: 3,935; Referees: Nikolov, Nachevski (MKD)

6 October 2022; 20:45	Paris Saint-Germain (France)	40–31	(Croatia) PPD Zagreb	Stade Pierre de Coubertin, Paris; Attendance: 1,998; Referees: Kurtagic, Wetterwik (SWE)
6 October 2022; 20:45	Syprzak 9	(22–14)	three players 4	Stade Pierre de Coubertin, Paris; Attendance: 1,998; Referees: Kurtagic, Wetterwik (SWE)
6 October 2022; 20:45	3× (suspension)	Report	4× (suspension)	Stade Pierre de Coubertin, Paris; Attendance: 1,998; Referees: Kurtagic, Wetterwik (SWE)

26 October 2022; 18:45	Dinamo București (Romania)	29–36	(France) Paris Saint-Germain	Polyvalent Hall, Bucharest; Attendance: 5,000; Referees: Jørum, Kleven (NOR)
26 October 2022; 18:45	Akimenko 8	(16–22)	Prandi 9	Polyvalent Hall, Bucharest; Attendance: 5,000; Referees: Jørum, Kleven (NOR)
26 October 2022; 18:45	1× (suspension)	Report	4× (suspension)	Polyvalent Hall, Bucharest; Attendance: 5,000; Referees: Jørum, Kleven (NOR)

26 October 2022; 18:45	PPD Zagreb (Croatia)	26–26	(Poland) Orlen Wisła Płock	Varaždin Arena, Varaždin; Attendance: 2,500; Referees: Mažeika, Gatelis (LTU)
26 October 2022; 18:45	Dibirov 6	(14–15)	Serdio 6	Varaždin Arena, Varaždin; Attendance: 2,500; Referees: Mažeika, Gatelis (LTU)
26 October 2022; 18:45	5× (suspension)	Report	1× (yellow card) 5× (suspension)	Varaždin Arena, Varaždin; Attendance: 2,500; Referees: Mažeika, Gatelis (LTU)

27 October 2022; 18:45	Telekom Veszprém (Hungary)	35–35	(Germany) SC Magdeburg	Veszprém Aréna, Veszprém; Attendance: 5,500; Referees: Pavićević, Ražnatović (MNE)
27 October 2022; 18:45	Lauge 8	(16–16)	Magnússon 8	Veszprém Aréna, Veszprém; Attendance: 5,500; Referees: Pavićević, Ražnatović (MNE)
27 October 2022; 18:45	8× (suspension) 1× (red card)	Report	1× (suspension)	Veszprém Aréna, Veszprém; Attendance: 5,500; Referees: Pavićević, Ražnatović (MNE)

27 October 2022; 20:45	FC Porto (Portugal)	26–33	(Denmark) GOG Håndbold	Dragão Arena, Porto; Attendance: 1,218; Referees: Erdoğan, Özdeniz (TUR)
27 October 2022; 20:45	Thurin 5	(10–15)	Tollbring 9	Dragão Arena, Porto; Attendance: 1,218; Referees: Erdoğan, Özdeniz (TUR)
27 October 2022; 20:45	6× (suspension)	Report	2× (yellow card) 5× (suspension)	Dragão Arena, Porto; Attendance: 1,218; Referees: Erdoğan, Özdeniz (TUR)

2 November 2022; 18:45	PPD Zagreb (Croatia)	28–29	(Romania) Dinamo București	Arena Zagreb, Zagreb; Attendance: 650; Referees: Elíasson, Pálsson (ISL)
2 November 2022; 18:45	Dibirov, Srna 8	(16–15)	Negru 7	Arena Zagreb, Zagreb; Attendance: 650; Referees: Elíasson, Pálsson (ISL)
2 November 2022; 18:45	1× (yellow card) 9× (suspension) 1× (red card)	Report	1× (yellow card) 4× (suspension)	Arena Zagreb, Zagreb; Attendance: 650; Referees: Elíasson, Pálsson (ISL)

3 November 2022; 18:45	Orlen Wisła Płock (Poland)	26–30	(Hungary) Telekom Veszprém	Orlen Arena, Płock; Attendance: 4,000; Referees: Lah, Sok (SLO)
3 November 2022; 18:45	Pérez Arce 5	(14–15)	Lauge 11	Orlen Arena, Płock; Attendance: 4,000; Referees: Lah, Sok (SLO)
3 November 2022; 18:45	1× (yellow card) 2× (suspension)	Report	6× (suspension) 1× (red card)	Orlen Arena, Płock; Attendance: 4,000; Referees: Lah, Sok (SLO)

3 November 2022; 18:45	Paris Saint-Germain (France)	32–30	(Portugal) FC Porto	Stade Pierre de Coubertin, Paris; Attendance: 3,000; Referees: Konjičanin, Konjičanin (BIH)
3 November 2022; 18:45	Prandi 11	(17–15)	Thurin 6	Stade Pierre de Coubertin, Paris; Attendance: 3,000; Referees: Konjičanin, Konjičanin (BIH)
3 November 2022; 18:45	2× (suspension)	Report	2× (suspension)	Stade Pierre de Coubertin, Paris; Attendance: 3,000; Referees: Konjičanin, Konjičanin (BIH)

3 November 2022; 20:45	GOG Håndbold (Denmark)	33–32	(Germany) SC Magdeburg	Arena Fyn, Odense; Attendance: 3,378; Referees: Kurtagic, Wetterwik (SWE)
3 November 2022; 20:45	Madsen 8	(13–16)	Smits 10	Arena Fyn, Odense; Attendance: 3,378; Referees: Kurtagic, Wetterwik (SWE)
3 November 2022; 20:45	2× (yellow card)	Report	1× (yellow card) 1× (suspension)	Arena Fyn, Odense; Attendance: 3,378; Referees: Kurtagic, Wetterwik (SWE)

23 November 2022; 20:45	Paris Saint-Germain (France)	41–36	(Denmark) GOG Håndbold	Stade Pierre de Coubertin, Paris; Attendance: 2,708; Referees: Schulze, Tönnies (GER)
23 November 2022; 20:45	three players 7	(16–16)	Jørgensen 9	Stade Pierre de Coubertin, Paris; Attendance: 2,708; Referees: Schulze, Tönnies (GER)
23 November 2022; 20:45	2× (suspension)	Report	1× (yellow card) 3× (suspension)	Stade Pierre de Coubertin, Paris; Attendance: 2,708; Referees: Schulze, Tönnies (GER)

24 November 2022; 18:45	Dinamo București (Romania)	32–27	(Poland) Orlen Wisła Płock	Polyvalent Hall, Bucharest; Attendance: 3,500; Referees: Horváth, Marton (HUN)
24 November 2022; 18:45	Kukić 7	(15–14)	Lučin 8	Polyvalent Hall, Bucharest; Attendance: 3,500; Referees: Horváth, Marton (HUN)
24 November 2022; 18:45	2× (yellow card) 3× (suspension) 1× (red card)	Report	2× (yellow card) 5× (suspension)	Polyvalent Hall, Bucharest; Attendance: 3,500; Referees: Horváth, Marton (HUN)

24 November 2022; 18:45	Telekom Veszprém (Hungary)	32–28	(Croatia) PPD Zagreb	Veszprém Aréna, Veszprém; Attendance: 4,625; Referees: Erdoğan, Özdeniz (TUR)
24 November 2022; 18:45	Nenadić 6	(16–15)	Musa 6	Veszprém Aréna, Veszprém; Attendance: 4,625; Referees: Erdoğan, Özdeniz (TUR)
24 November 2022; 18:45	1× (yellow card) 2× (suspension) 1× (red card)	Report	3× (yellow card) 5× (suspension) 1× (red card)	Veszprém Aréna, Veszprém; Attendance: 4,625; Referees: Erdoğan, Özdeniz (TUR)

24 November 2022; 20:45	SC Magdeburg (Germany)	41–36	(Portugal) FC Porto	GETEC Arena, Magdeburg; Attendance: 4,312; Referees: Brkic, Jusufhodzic (AUT)
24 November 2022; 20:45	Magnússon, Musche 10	(22–17)	Iturriza 7	GETEC Arena, Magdeburg; Attendance: 4,312; Referees: Brkic, Jusufhodzic (AUT)
24 November 2022; 20:45	1× (yellow card) 2× (suspension)	Report	4× (suspension)	GETEC Arena, Magdeburg; Attendance: 4,312; Referees: Brkic, Jusufhodzic (AUT)

30 November 2022; 20:45	GOG Håndbold (Denmark)	35–40	(France) Paris Saint-Germain	Arena Fyn, Odense; Attendance: 3,952; Referees: Santos, Fonseca (POR)
30 November 2022; 20:45	Olsen 12	(19–22)	Syprzak 10	Arena Fyn, Odense; Attendance: 3,952; Referees: Santos, Fonseca (POR)
30 November 2022; 20:45	2× (yellow card) 2× (suspension)	Report	2× (yellow card) 4× (suspension)	Arena Fyn, Odense; Attendance: 3,952; Referees: Santos, Fonseca (POR)

30 November 2022; 20:45	PPD Zagreb (Croatia)	29–26	(Hungary) Telekom Veszprém	Arena Zagreb, Zagreb; Attendance: 1,300; Referees: Madsen, Mortensen (DEN)
30 November 2022; 20:45	Sirotić 6	(12–14)	Nilsson, Omar 7	Arena Zagreb, Zagreb; Attendance: 1,300; Referees: Madsen, Mortensen (DEN)
30 November 2022; 20:45	2× (yellow card) 5× (suspension)	Report	2× (yellow card) 5× (suspension) 1× (red card)	Arena Zagreb, Zagreb; Attendance: 1,300; Referees: Madsen, Mortensen (DEN)

1 December 2022; 18:45	Orlen Wisła Płock (Poland)	26–28	(Romania) Dinamo București	Orlen Arena, Płock; Attendance: 2,350; Referees: Horáček, Novotný (CZE)
1 December 2022; 18:45	Lučin 10	(12–12)	Shebib, Zein 5	Orlen Arena, Płock; Attendance: 2,350; Referees: Horáček, Novotný (CZE)
1 December 2022; 18:45	4× (suspension)	Report	5× (suspension)	Orlen Arena, Płock; Attendance: 2,350; Referees: Horáček, Novotný (CZE)

1 December 2022; 20:45	FC Porto (Portugal)	31–31	(Germany) SC Magdeburg	Dragão Arena, Porto; Attendance: 1,011; Referees: Marín, García (ESP)
1 December 2022; 20:45	Iturriza 7	(12–16)	Magnússon 7	Dragão Arena, Porto; Attendance: 1,011; Referees: Marín, García (ESP)
1 December 2022; 20:45	2× (yellow card) 2× (suspension)	Report	2× (suspension)	Dragão Arena, Porto; Attendance: 1,011; Referees: Marín, García (ESP)

7 December 2022; 20:45	SC Magdeburg (Germany)	36–34	(Denmark) GOG Håndbold	GETEC Arena, Magdeburg; Attendance: 3,984; Referees: Bíró, Kiss (HUN)
7 December 2022; 20:45	Magnússon 11	(21–18)	Madsen 10	GETEC Arena, Magdeburg; Attendance: 3,984; Referees: Bíró, Kiss (HUN)
7 December 2022; 20:45	3× (suspension)	Report	1× (suspension)	GETEC Arena, Magdeburg; Attendance: 3,984; Referees: Bíró, Kiss (HUN)

7 December 2022; 20:45	FC Porto (Portugal)	33–35	(France) Paris Saint-Germain	Dragão Arena, Porto; Attendance: 1,407; Referees: Merz, Kuttler (GER)
7 December 2022; 20:45	Iturriza 8	(17–16)	Syprzak 9	Dragão Arena, Porto; Attendance: 1,407; Referees: Merz, Kuttler (GER)
7 December 2022; 20:45	3× (suspension)	Report	2× (yellow card)	Dragão Arena, Porto; Attendance: 1,407; Referees: Merz, Kuttler (GER)

8 December 2022; 18:45	Dinamo București (Romania)	27–27	(Croatia) PPD Zagreb	Polyvalent Hall, Bucharest; Attendance: 3,229; Referees: Nikolov, Nachevski (MKD)
8 December 2022; 18:45	Akimenko 6	(14–13)	Dibirov 7	Polyvalent Hall, Bucharest; Attendance: 3,229; Referees: Nikolov, Nachevski (MKD)
8 December 2022; 18:45	3× (suspension)	Report	2× (yellow card) 5× (suspension)	Polyvalent Hall, Bucharest; Attendance: 3,229; Referees: Nikolov, Nachevski (MKD)

8 December 2022; 18:45	Telekom Veszprém (Hungary)	32–22	(Poland) Orlen Wisła Płock	Veszprém Aréna, Veszprém; Attendance: 5,019; Referees: Jørum, Kleven (NOR)
8 December 2022; 18:45	Nenadić 9	(17–9)	Kosorotov 7	Veszprém Aréna, Veszprém; Attendance: 5,019; Referees: Jørum, Kleven (NOR)
8 December 2022; 18:45	4× (suspension)	Report	1× (yellow card) 9× (suspension) 1× (red card)	Veszprém Aréna, Veszprém; Attendance: 5,019; Referees: Jørum, Kleven (NOR)

14 December 2022; 18:45	Paris Saint-Germain (France)	33–37	(Germany) SC Magdeburg	Stade Pierre de Coubertin, Paris; Attendance: 1,327; Referees: Horáček, Novotný (CZE)
14 December 2022; 18:45	Krištopāns 7	(19–15)	Magnússon 12	Stade Pierre de Coubertin, Paris; Attendance: 1,327; Referees: Horáček, Novotný (CZE)
14 December 2022; 18:45	3× (suspension)	Report	1× (yellow card) 4× (suspension)	Stade Pierre de Coubertin, Paris; Attendance: 1,327; Referees: Horáček, Novotný (CZE)

14 December 2022; 20:45	GOG Håndbold (Denmark)	34–33	(Portugal) FC Porto	Arena Fyn, Odense; Attendance: 3,037; Referees: Lah, Sok (SLO)
14 December 2022; 20:45	Olsen 10	(15–13)	Fernandes 6	Arena Fyn, Odense; Attendance: 3,037; Referees: Lah, Sok (SLO)
14 December 2022; 20:45	1× (yellow card) 3× (suspension)	Report	1× (yellow card) 2× (suspension) 1× (red card)	Arena Fyn, Odense; Attendance: 3,037; Referees: Lah, Sok (SLO)

15 December 2022; 18:45	Dinamo București (Romania)	31–31	(Hungary) Telekom Veszprém	Polyvalent Hall, Bucharest; Attendance: 3,700; Referees: Marín, García (ESP)
15 December 2022; 18:45	Akimenko 7	(13–16)	Nenadić, Vailupau 7	Polyvalent Hall, Bucharest; Attendance: 3,700; Referees: Marín, García (ESP)
15 December 2022; 18:45	1× (yellow card) 1× (suspension)	Report	2× (yellow card) 3× (suspension)	Polyvalent Hall, Bucharest; Attendance: 3,700; Referees: Marín, García (ESP)

15 December 2022; 20:45	Orlen Wisła Płock (Poland)	26–30	(Croatia) PPD Zagreb	Orlen Arena, Płock; Attendance: 2,100; Referees: Baumgart, Wild (GER)
15 December 2022; 20:45	Daszek 8	(13–14)	four players 4	Orlen Arena, Płock; Attendance: 2,100; Referees: Baumgart, Wild (GER)
15 December 2022; 20:45	1× (yellow card) 2× (suspension)	Report	1× (yellow card) 7× (suspension)	Orlen Arena, Płock; Attendance: 2,100; Referees: Baumgart, Wild (GER)

8 February 2023; 18:45	Telekom Veszprém (Hungary)	36–37	(Denmark) GOG Håndbold	Veszprém Aréna, Veszprém; Attendance: 5,000; Referees: Martins, Martins (POR)
8 February 2023; 18:45	Nenadić 8	(21–19)	Madsen, Tollbring 8	Veszprém Aréna, Veszprém; Attendance: 5,000; Referees: Martins, Martins (POR)
8 February 2023; 18:45	2× (suspension)	Report	1× (yellow card) 4× (suspension)	Veszprém Aréna, Veszprém; Attendance: 5,000; Referees: Martins, Martins (POR)

8 February 2023; 18:45	PPD Zagreb (Croatia)	30–33	(France) Paris Saint-Germain	Arena Zagreb, Zagreb; Attendance: 5,300; Referees: Jørum, Kleven (NOR)
8 February 2023; 18:45	Dibirov 10	(14–17)	Solé 12	Arena Zagreb, Zagreb; Attendance: 5,300; Referees: Jørum, Kleven (NOR)
8 February 2023; 18:45	1× (yellow card) 4× (suspension)	Report	3× (suspension)	Arena Zagreb, Zagreb; Attendance: 5,300; Referees: Jørum, Kleven (NOR)

8 February 2023; 20:45	FC Porto (Portugal)	32–23	(Romania) Dinamo București	Dragão Arena, Porto; Attendance: 1,124; Referees: Pavićević, Ražnatović (MNE)
8 February 2023; 20:45	Læsø, Thurin 7	(14–13)	Akimenko, Kuduz 6	Dragão Arena, Porto; Attendance: 1,124; Referees: Pavićević, Ražnatović (MNE)
8 February 2023; 20:45	3× (suspension)	Report	4× (suspension)	Dragão Arena, Porto; Attendance: 1,124; Referees: Pavićević, Ražnatović (MNE)

9 February 2023; 20:45	Orlen Wisła Płock (Poland)	25–24	(Germany) SC Magdeburg	Orlen Arena, Płock; Attendance: 2,300; Referees: Álvarez, Bustamante (ESP)
9 February 2023; 20:45	Lučin 6	(14–10)	Kristjánsson 7	Orlen Arena, Płock; Attendance: 2,300; Referees: Álvarez, Bustamante (ESP)
9 February 2023; 20:45	1× (yellow card) 4× (suspension)	Report	2× (yellow card) 1× (suspension)	Orlen Arena, Płock; Attendance: 2,300; Referees: Álvarez, Bustamante (ESP)

15 February 2023; 20:45	GOG Håndbold (Denmark)	31–24	(Poland) Orlen Wisła Płock	Phønix Tag Arena, Gudme; Attendance: 1,742; Referees: Bonaventura, Bonaventura (FRA)
15 February 2023; 20:45	Madsen 7	(18–11)	Lučin 7	Phønix Tag Arena, Gudme; Attendance: 1,742; Referees: Bonaventura, Bonaventura (FRA)
15 February 2023; 20:45		Report	1× (yellow card) 7× (suspension)	Phønix Tag Arena, Gudme; Attendance: 1,742; Referees: Bonaventura, Bonaventura (FRA)

16 February 2023; 20:45	SC Magdeburg (Germany)	32–25	(Hungary) Telekom Veszprém	GETEC Arena, Magdeburg; Attendance: 5,500; Referees: Brunner, Salah (SUI)
16 February 2023; 20:45	Smits, Weber 9	(16–15)	three players 5	GETEC Arena, Magdeburg; Attendance: 5,500; Referees: Brunner, Salah (SUI)
16 February 2023; 20:45	3× (suspension)	Report	6× (suspension) 1× (red card)	GETEC Arena, Magdeburg; Attendance: 5,500; Referees: Brunner, Salah (SUI)

16 February 2023; 20:45	Paris Saint-Germain (France)	33–26	(Romania) Dinamo București	Stade Pierre de Coubertin, Paris; Attendance: 2,740; Referees: Lah, Sok (SLO)
16 February 2023; 20:45	Prandi 6	(17–14)	Humet 7	Stade Pierre de Coubertin, Paris; Attendance: 2,740; Referees: Lah, Sok (SLO)
16 February 2023; 20:45	2× (suspension)	Report	3× (suspension)	Stade Pierre de Coubertin, Paris; Attendance: 2,740; Referees: Lah, Sok (SLO)

22 February 2023; 20:45	PPD Zagreb (Croatia)	25–31	(Germany) SC Magdeburg	Arena Zagreb, Zagreb; Attendance: 2,700; Referees: Lah, Sok (SLO)
22 February 2023; 20:45	Čupić 6	(14–16)	Smits 9	Arena Zagreb, Zagreb; Attendance: 2,700; Referees: Lah, Sok (SLO)
22 February 2023; 20:45	1× (yellow card) 3× (suspension)	Report	5× (suspension)	Arena Zagreb, Zagreb; Attendance: 2,700; Referees: Lah, Sok (SLO)

23 February 2023; 18:45	Orlen Wisła Płock (Poland)	26–32	(France) Paris Saint-Germain	Orlen Arena, Płock; Attendance: 4,500; Referees: Pavićević, Ražnatović (MNE)
23 February 2023; 18:45	Zhitnikov 8	(14–15)	Syprzak 6	Orlen Arena, Płock; Attendance: 4,500; Referees: Pavićević, Ražnatović (MNE)
23 February 2023; 18:45	3× (suspension)	Report	1× (suspension)	Orlen Arena, Płock; Attendance: 4,500; Referees: Pavićević, Ražnatović (MNE)

23 February 2023; 18:45	Telekom Veszprém (Hungary)	32–30	(Portugal) FC Porto	Veszprém Aréna, Veszprém; Attendance: 5,000; Referees: Konjičanin, Konjičanin (BIH)
23 February 2023; 18:45	El-Deraa 12	(15–14)	Areia 6	Veszprém Aréna, Veszprém; Attendance: 5,000; Referees: Konjičanin, Konjičanin (BIH)
23 February 2023; 18:45	2× (suspension)	Report	4× (suspension)	Veszprém Aréna, Veszprém; Attendance: 5,000; Referees: Konjičanin, Konjičanin (BIH)

23 February 2023; 18:45	Dinamo București (Romania)	30–27	(Denmark) GOG Håndbold	Polyvalent Hall, Bucharest; Attendance: 4,250; Referees: Mažeika, Gatelis (LTU)
23 February 2023; 18:45	Kuduz 9	(14–13)	Nygaard Pedersen 6	Polyvalent Hall, Bucharest; Attendance: 4,250; Referees: Mažeika, Gatelis (LTU)
23 February 2023; 18:45	4× (suspension)	Report	1× (yellow card) 5× (suspension)	Polyvalent Hall, Bucharest; Attendance: 4,250; Referees: Mažeika, Gatelis (LTU)

26 February 2023 (Note: The match, originally scheduled for 16 February 2023, was postponed due to travel issues for the team from Zagreb.); 18:45	FC Porto (Portugal)	28–26	(Croatia) PPD Zagreb	Dragão Arena, Porto; Attendance: 1,174; Referees: Schulze, Tönnies (GER)
26 February 2023; 18:45	Valdés 6	(12–11)	Dibirov 10	Dragão Arena, Porto; Attendance: 1,174; Referees: Schulze, Tönnies (GER)
26 February 2023; 18:45	2× (suspension)	Report	1× (suspension)	Dragão Arena, Porto; Attendance: 1,174; Referees: Schulze, Tönnies (GER)

1 March 2023; 20:45	GOG Håndbold (Denmark)	33–29	(Croatia) PPD Zagreb	Arena Fyn, Odense; Attendance: 3,862; Referees: Horáček, Novotný (CZE)
1 March 2023; 20:45	Pytlick, Tollbring 5	(20–12)	Dibirov 8	Arena Fyn, Odense; Attendance: 3,862; Referees: Horáček, Novotný (CZE)
1 March 2023; 20:45	2× (yellow card) 4× (suspension)	Report	6× (suspension)	Arena Fyn, Odense; Attendance: 3,862; Referees: Horáček, Novotný (CZE)

1 March 2023; 20:45	Paris Saint-Germain (France)	37–35	(Hungary) Telekom Veszprém	Stade Pierre de Coubertin, Paris; Attendance: 3,116; Referees: Gubica, Milošević (CRO)
1 March 2023; 20:45	Máthé, Prandi 7	(19–24)	Pechmalbech 8	Stade Pierre de Coubertin, Paris; Attendance: 3,116; Referees: Gubica, Milošević (CRO)
1 March 2023; 20:45	1× (suspension)	Report	1× (suspension)	Stade Pierre de Coubertin, Paris; Attendance: 3,116; Referees: Gubica, Milošević (CRO)

2 March 2023; 20:45	SC Magdeburg (Germany)	34–33	(Romania) Dinamo București	GETEC Arena, Magdeburg; Attendance: 5,195; Referees: Elíasson, Pálsson (ISL)
2 March 2023; 20:45	Hornke 10	(19–17)	Pascual Garcia, Silva 5	GETEC Arena, Magdeburg; Attendance: 5,195; Referees: Elíasson, Pálsson (ISL)
2 March 2023; 20:45	2× (yellow card) 2× (suspension)	Report	1× (yellow card) 3× (suspension) 1× (red card)	GETEC Arena, Magdeburg; Attendance: 5,195; Referees: Elíasson, Pálsson (ISL)

2 March 2023; 20:45	FC Porto (Portugal)	27–28	(Poland) Orlen Wisła Płock	Dragão Arena, Porto; Attendance: 715; Referees: Brunner, Salah (SUI)
2 March 2023; 20:45	Areia, Thurin 6	(13–15)	Lučin 9	Dragão Arena, Porto; Attendance: 715; Referees: Brunner, Salah (SUI)
2 March 2023; 20:45	6× (suspension)	Report	3× (suspension)	Dragão Arena, Porto; Attendance: 715; Referees: Brunner, Salah (SUI)

=== Group B ===
Pos	Team	Pld	W	D	L	GF	GA	GD	Pts	Qualification
1	(Spain) Barça	14	13	1	0	484	404	+80	27	Quarterfinals
2	(Poland) Barlinek Industria Kielce	14	11	0	3	465	427	+38	22	Quarterfinals
3	(France) HBC Nantes	14	7	1	6	478	451	+27	15 (Note: Nantes 71–67 Kiel)	Playoffs
4	(Germany) THW Kiel	14	6	3	5	460	440	+20	15	Playoffs
5	(Denmark) Aalborg Håndbold	14	6	1	7	445	438	+7	13	Playoffs
6	(Hungary) OTP Bank - Pick Szeged	14	5	1	8	426	452	−26	11	Playoffs
7	(Slovenia) Celje Pivovarna Laško	14	3	0	11	412	475	−63	6	
8	(Norway) Elverum Håndball	14	1	1	12	398	481	−83	3	

Source: EHF
Rules for classification: Tiebreakers
Notes:

14 September 2022; 18:45	OTP Bank - Pick Szeged (Hungary)	28–35	(Spain) Barça	Pick Aréna, Szeged; Attendance: 8,000; Referees: Lah, Sok (SLO)
14 September 2022; 18:45	Bodó 5	(15–14)	Fabregas, Mem 7	Pick Aréna, Szeged; Attendance: 8,000; Referees: Lah, Sok (SLO)
14 September 2022; 18:45	1× (yellow card) 1× (suspension)	Report	5× (suspension)	Pick Aréna, Szeged; Attendance: 8,000; Referees: Lah, Sok (SLO)

14 September 2022; 18:45	THW Kiel (Germany)	36–26	(Norway) Elverum Håndball	Wunderino Arena, Kiel; Attendance: 5,021; Referees: Konjičanin, Konjičanin (BIH)
14 September 2022; 18:45	Reinkind 6	(17–13)	Borzaš 6	Wunderino Arena, Kiel; Attendance: 5,021; Referees: Konjičanin, Konjičanin (BIH)
14 September 2022; 18:45	1× (yellow card) 5× (suspension)	Report	1× (yellow card) 4× (suspension)	Wunderino Arena, Kiel; Attendance: 5,021; Referees: Konjičanin, Konjičanin (BIH)

14 September 2022; 20:45	Barlinek Industria Kielce (Poland)	40–33	(France) HBC Nantes	Hala Legionów, Kielce; Attendance: 4,100; Referees: Horáček, Novotný (CZE)
14 September 2022; 20:45	five players 5	(23–18)	Minne 9	Hala Legionów, Kielce; Attendance: 4,100; Referees: Horáček, Novotný (CZE)
14 September 2022; 20:45	2× (suspension)	Report	5× (suspension)	Hala Legionów, Kielce; Attendance: 4,100; Referees: Horáček, Novotný (CZE)

15 September 2022; 18:45	Aalborg Håndbold (Denmark)	36–32	(Slovenia) Celje Pivovarna Laško	Gigantium, Aalborg; Attendance: 4,717; Referees: Bíró, Kiss (HUN)
15 September 2022; 18:45	Hansen 10	(20–17)	Marguč 8	Gigantium, Aalborg; Attendance: 4,717; Referees: Bíró, Kiss (HUN)
15 September 2022; 18:45	2× (suspension)	Report	1× (yellow card) 5× (suspension)	Gigantium, Aalborg; Attendance: 4,717; Referees: Bíró, Kiss (HUN)

21 September 2022; 18:45	Celje Pivovarna Laško (Slovenia)	38–36	(Germany) THW Kiel	Zlatorog Arena, Celje; Attendance: 2,100; Referees: Madsen, Mortensen (DEN)
21 September 2022; 18:45	Vlah 10	(17–14)	Wiencek 10	Zlatorog Arena, Celje; Attendance: 2,100; Referees: Madsen, Mortensen (DEN)
21 September 2022; 18:45	1× (yellow card) 5× (suspension) 1× (red card)	Report	1× (yellow card) 2× (suspension)	Zlatorog Arena, Celje; Attendance: 2,100; Referees: Madsen, Mortensen (DEN)

21 September 2022; 18:45	Elverum Håndball (Norway)	25–33	(Denmark) Aalborg Håndbold	Terningen Arena, Elverum; Attendance: 1,920; Referees: Nikolov, Nachevski (MKD)
21 September 2022; 18:45	Moen Nilsen 5	(14–17)	Hoxer Hangaard 7	Terningen Arena, Elverum; Attendance: 1,920; Referees: Nikolov, Nachevski (MKD)
21 September 2022; 18:45	1× (suspension) 1× (red card)	Report	5× (suspension)	Terningen Arena, Elverum; Attendance: 1,920; Referees: Nikolov, Nachevski (MKD)

22 September 2022; 18:45	HBC Nantes (France)	35–30	(Hungary) OTP Bank - Pick Szeged	H Arena, Nantes; Attendance: 5,629; Referees: Gubica, Milošević (CRO)
22 September 2022; 18:45	Rivera 10	(17–15)	Radivojević 9	H Arena, Nantes; Attendance: 5,629; Referees: Gubica, Milošević (CRO)
22 September 2022; 18:45	1× (yellow card) 5× (suspension)	Report	2× (suspension)	H Arena, Nantes; Attendance: 5,629; Referees: Gubica, Milošević (CRO)

22 September 2022; 20:45	Barça (Spain)	32–28	(Poland) Barlinek Industria Kielce	Palau Blaugrana, Barcelona; Attendance: 3,504; Referees: Kurtagic, Wetterwik (SWE)
22 September 2022; 20:45	Fabregas 6	(18–13)	Moryto 6	Palau Blaugrana, Barcelona; Attendance: 3,504; Referees: Kurtagic, Wetterwik (SWE)
22 September 2022; 20:45	5× (suspension) 1× (red card)	Report	5× (suspension)	Palau Blaugrana, Barcelona; Attendance: 3,504; Referees: Kurtagic, Wetterwik (SWE)

28 September 2022; 20:45	Aalborg Håndbold (Denmark)	28–30	(Poland) Barlinek Industria Kielce	Gigantium, Aalborg; Attendance: 4,752; Referees: Schulze, Tönnies (GER)
28 September 2022; 20:45	Barthold, Sandell 5	(15–17)	Moryto 6	Gigantium, Aalborg; Attendance: 4,752; Referees: Schulze, Tönnies (GER)
28 September 2022; 20:45	1× (yellow card) 3× (suspension)	Report	3× (suspension)	Gigantium, Aalborg; Attendance: 4,752; Referees: Schulze, Tönnies (GER)

29 September 2022; 18:45	THW Kiel (Germany)	34–29	(Hungary) OTP Bank - Pick Szeged	Wunderino Arena, Kiel; Attendance: 5,316; Referees: Brkic, Jusufhodzic (AUT)
29 September 2022; 18:45	Ekberg 6	(15–14)	Rosta 5	Wunderino Arena, Kiel; Attendance: 5,316; Referees: Brkic, Jusufhodzic (AUT)
29 September 2022; 18:45	4× (suspension)	Report	1× (yellow card) 3× (suspension)	Wunderino Arena, Kiel; Attendance: 5,316; Referees: Brkic, Jusufhodzic (AUT)

29 September 2022; 20:45	Barça (Spain)	38–30	(Slovenia) Celje Pivovarna Laško	Palau Blaugrana, Barcelona; Attendance: 1,508; Referees: Erdoğan, Özdeniz (TUR)
29 September 2022; 20:45	Mem 10	(19–15)	Vlah 7	Palau Blaugrana, Barcelona; Attendance: 1,508; Referees: Erdoğan, Özdeniz (TUR)
29 September 2022; 20:45	3× (suspension)	Report	2× (yellow card) 4× (suspension) 1× (red card)	Palau Blaugrana, Barcelona; Attendance: 1,508; Referees: Erdoğan, Özdeniz (TUR)

29 September 2022; 20:45	HBC Nantes (France)	41–30	(Norway) Elverum Håndball	H Arena, Nantes; Attendance: 5,632; Referees: Baumgart, Wild (GER)
29 September 2022; 20:45	Minne 7	(20–14)	Awad 8	H Arena, Nantes; Attendance: 5,632; Referees: Baumgart, Wild (GER)
29 September 2022; 20:45	1× (yellow card) 4× (suspension) 1× (red card)	Report	1× (yellow card) 5× (suspension)	H Arena, Nantes; Attendance: 5,632; Referees: Baumgart, Wild (GER)

5 October 2022; 18:45	Celje Pivovarna Laško (Slovenia)	24–35	(France) HBC Nantes	Zlatorog Arena, Celje; Attendance: 2,200; Referees: Pavićević, Ražnatović (MNE)
5 October 2022; 18:45	Vlah 9	(14–20)	Minne 8	Zlatorog Arena, Celje; Attendance: 2,200; Referees: Pavićević, Ražnatović (MNE)
5 October 2022; 18:45	1× (yellow card) 4× (suspension)	Report	3× (suspension)	Zlatorog Arena, Celje; Attendance: 2,200; Referees: Pavićević, Ražnatović (MNE)

6 October 2022; 18:45	OTP Bank - Pick Szeged (Hungary)	29–41	(Denmark) Aalborg Håndbold	Pick Aréna, Szeged; Attendance: 3,000; Referees: Bonaventura, Bonaventura (FRA)
6 October 2022; 18:45	Šoštarič 6	(15–17)	Hansen 11	Pick Aréna, Szeged; Attendance: 3,000; Referees: Bonaventura, Bonaventura (FRA)
6 October 2022; 18:45	1× (yellow card) 5× (suspension)	Report	2× (suspension)	Pick Aréna, Szeged; Attendance: 3,000; Referees: Bonaventura, Bonaventura (FRA)

6 October 2022; 18:45	Elverum Håndball (Norway)	30–46	(Spain) Barça	Håkons Hall, Lillehammer; Attendance: 6,742; Referees: Madsen, Mortensen (DEN)
6 October 2022; 18:45	Moen Nilsen 7	(15–23)	N'Guessan 8	Håkons Hall, Lillehammer; Attendance: 6,742; Referees: Madsen, Mortensen (DEN)
6 October 2022; 18:45	2× (yellow card) 5× (suspension)	Report	1× (suspension)	Håkons Hall, Lillehammer; Attendance: 6,742; Referees: Madsen, Mortensen (DEN)

6 October 2022; 20:45	Barlinek Industria Kielce (Poland)	40–37	(Germany) THW Kiel	Hala Legionów, Kielce; Attendance: 4,200; Referees: Gubica, Milošević (CRO)
6 October 2022; 20:45	A. Dujshebaev, Sićko 7	(19–19)	Johansson 9	Hala Legionów, Kielce; Attendance: 4,200; Referees: Gubica, Milošević (CRO)
6 October 2022; 20:45	1× (yellow card) 2× (suspension)	Report	4× (suspension)	Hala Legionów, Kielce; Attendance: 4,200; Referees: Gubica, Milošević (CRO)

26 October 2022; 18:45	OTP Bank - Pick Szeged (Hungary)	30–23	(Norway) Elverum Håndball	Pick Aréna, Szeged; Attendance: 4,000; Referees: Martins, Martins (POR)
26 October 2022; 18:45	Rosta, Tønnesen 6	(16–10)	Blomgren 4	Pick Aréna, Szeged; Attendance: 4,000; Referees: Martins, Martins (POR)
26 October 2022; 18:45	1× (yellow card) 4× (suspension)	Report	3× (suspension)	Pick Aréna, Szeged; Attendance: 4,000; Referees: Martins, Martins (POR)

26 October 2022; 20:45	Aalborg Håndbold (Denmark)	33–39	(Spain) Barça	Gigantium, Aalborg; Attendance: 5,020; Referees: Jurinović, Mrvica (CRO)
26 October 2022; 20:45	Sandell 8	(19–19)	Gómez 11	Gigantium, Aalborg; Attendance: 5,020; Referees: Jurinović, Mrvica (CRO)
26 October 2022; 20:45	1× (yellow card) 1× (suspension)	Report	2× (suspension)	Gigantium, Aalborg; Attendance: 5,020; Referees: Jurinović, Mrvica (CRO)

27 October 2022; 18:45	Celje Pivovarna Laško (Slovenia)	30–33	(Poland) Barlinek Industria Kielce	Zlatorog Arena, Celje; Attendance: 2,750; Referees: Bonaventura, Bonaventura (FRA)
27 October 2022; 18:45	Vlah 8	(16–17)	Sićko 8	Zlatorog Arena, Celje; Attendance: 2,750; Referees: Bonaventura, Bonaventura (FRA)
27 October 2022; 18:45	2× (yellow card) 5× (suspension)	Report	2× (suspension)	Zlatorog Arena, Celje; Attendance: 2,750; Referees: Bonaventura, Bonaventura (FRA)

27 October 2022; 20:45	HBC Nantes (France)	38–30	(Germany) THW Kiel	H Arena, Nantes; Attendance: 5,902; Referees: Nikolov, Nachevski (MKD)
27 October 2022; 20:45	Odriozola 7	(20–15)	Wallinius 6	H Arena, Nantes; Attendance: 5,902; Referees: Nikolov, Nachevski (MKD)
27 October 2022; 20:45	1× (yellow card) 3× (suspension)	Report	1× (yellow card) 4× (suspension)	H Arena, Nantes; Attendance: 5,902; Referees: Nikolov, Nachevski (MKD)

2 November 2022; 18:45	Elverum Håndball (Norway)	31–29	(Slovenia) Celje Pivovarna Laško	Terningen Arena, Elverum; Attendance: 1,432; Referees: Marín, García (ESP)
2 November 2022; 18:45	Grøndahl 8	(17–14)	Žabić 8	Terningen Arena, Elverum; Attendance: 1,432; Referees: Marín, García (ESP)
2 November 2022; 18:45	1× (yellow card) 4× (suspension)	Report	2× (yellow card) 4× (suspension) 1× (red card)	Terningen Arena, Elverum; Attendance: 1,432; Referees: Marín, García (ESP)

2 November 2022; 20:45	THW Kiel (Germany)	36–36	(Denmark) Aalborg Håndbold	Wunderino Arena, Kiel; Attendance: 6,727; Referees: Horáček, Novotný (CZE)
2 November 2022; 20:45	Johansson 9	(17–16)	Hansen 7	Wunderino Arena, Kiel; Attendance: 6,727; Referees: Horáček, Novotný (CZE)
2 November 2022; 20:45	1× (suspension)	Report	1× (yellow card) 3× (suspension)	Wunderino Arena, Kiel; Attendance: 6,727; Referees: Horáček, Novotný (CZE)

3 November 2022; 20:45	Barça (Spain)	34–29	(France) HBC Nantes	Palau Blaugrana, Barcelona; Attendance: 3,119; Referees: Santos, Fonseca (POR)
3 November 2022; 20:45	Fabregas 6	(16–17)	Briet 8	Palau Blaugrana, Barcelona; Attendance: 3,119; Referees: Santos, Fonseca (POR)
3 November 2022; 20:45	1× (suspension)	Report	2× (suspension)	Palau Blaugrana, Barcelona; Attendance: 3,119; Referees: Santos, Fonseca (POR)

3 November 2022; 20:45	Barlinek Industria Kielce (Poland)	37–30	(Hungary) OTP Bank - Pick Szeged	Hala Legionów, Kielce; Attendance: 4,200; Referees: Hansen, Madsen (DEN)
3 November 2022; 20:45	Moryto, Sićko 7	(22–14)	three players 5	Hala Legionów, Kielce; Attendance: 4,200; Referees: Hansen, Madsen (DEN)
3 November 2022; 20:45	4× (suspension)	Report	4× (suspension)	Hala Legionów, Kielce; Attendance: 4,200; Referees: Hansen, Madsen (DEN)

23 November 2022; 18:45	OTP Bank - Pick Szeged (Hungary)	36–27	(Slovenia) Celje Pivovarna Laško	Pick Aréna, Szeged; Attendance: 4,000; Referees: Nikolov, Nachevski (MKD)
23 November 2022; 18:45	three players 6	(18–12)	Martinović 5	Pick Aréna, Szeged; Attendance: 4,000; Referees: Nikolov, Nachevski (MKD)
23 November 2022; 18:45	1× (yellow card) 5× (suspension)	Report	1× (yellow card) 8× (suspension) 1× (red card)	Pick Aréna, Szeged; Attendance: 4,000; Referees: Nikolov, Nachevski (MKD)

23 November 2022; 18:45	Aalborg Håndbold (Denmark)	33–34	(France) HBC Nantes	Gigantium, Aalborg; Attendance: 5,020; Referees: Gubica, Milošević (CRO)
23 November 2022; 18:45	Barthold 7	(17–20)	Rivera Folch 8	Gigantium, Aalborg; Attendance: 5,020; Referees: Gubica, Milošević (CRO)
23 November 2022; 18:45	2× (suspension)	Report	1× (yellow card) 4× (suspension)	Gigantium, Aalborg; Attendance: 5,020; Referees: Gubica, Milošević (CRO)

24 November 2022; 18:45	THW Kiel (Germany)	30–30	(Spain) Barça	Wunderino Arena, Kiel; Attendance: 9,421; Referees: Mažeika, Gatelis (LTU)
24 November 2022; 18:45	Ekberg 9	(14–18)	Janc, N'Guessan 5	Wunderino Arena, Kiel; Attendance: 9,421; Referees: Mažeika, Gatelis (LTU)
24 November 2022; 18:45	2× (yellow card) 3× (suspension)	Report	1× (yellow card) 2× (suspension)	Wunderino Arena, Kiel; Attendance: 9,421; Referees: Mažeika, Gatelis (LTU)

24 November 2022; 20:45	Barlinek Industria Kielce (Poland)	37–33	(Norway) Elverum Håndball	Hala Legionów, Kielce; Attendance: 4,000; Referees: Sekulić, Jovandić (SRB)
24 November 2022; 20:45	Karalek 10	(21–17)	Borzaš 6	Hala Legionów, Kielce; Attendance: 4,000; Referees: Sekulić, Jovandić (SRB)
24 November 2022; 20:45	1× (yellow card) 3× (suspension)	Report	1× (yellow card) 2× (suspension)	Hala Legionów, Kielce; Attendance: 4,000; Referees: Sekulić, Jovandić (SRB)

30 November 2022; 18:45	Celje Pivovarna Laško (Slovenia)	28–36	(Hungary) OTP Bank - Pick Szeged	Zlatorog Arena, Celje; Attendance: 2,000; Referees: Elíasson, Pálsson (ISL)
30 November 2022; 18:45	Cokan, Strmljan 5	(13–20)	Bodó, Frimmel 6	Zlatorog Arena, Celje; Attendance: 2,000; Referees: Elíasson, Pálsson (ISL)
30 November 2022; 18:45	2× (yellow card) 7× (suspension)	Report	1× (yellow card) 5× (suspension)	Zlatorog Arena, Celje; Attendance: 2,000; Referees: Elíasson, Pálsson (ISL)

30 November 2022; 18:45	Elverum Håndball (Norway)	26–27	(Poland) Barlinek Industria Kielce	Terningen Arena, Elverum; Attendance: 1,610; Referees: Pavićević, Ražnatović (MNE)
30 November 2022; 18:45	Borzaš 6	(13–14)	A. Dujshebaev 6	Terningen Arena, Elverum; Attendance: 1,610; Referees: Pavićević, Ražnatović (MNE)
30 November 2022; 18:45	4× (suspension)	Report	1× (suspension)	Terningen Arena, Elverum; Attendance: 1,610; Referees: Pavićević, Ražnatović (MNE)

30 November 2022; 20:45	Barça (Spain)	26–24	(Germany) THW Kiel	Palau Blaugrana, Barcelona; Attendance: 4,636; Referees: Bonaventura, Bonaventura (FRA)
30 November 2022; 20:45	Makuc 6	(13–13)	Ekberg 5	Palau Blaugrana, Barcelona; Attendance: 4,636; Referees: Bonaventura, Bonaventura (FRA)
30 November 2022; 20:45	2× (suspension)	Report	7× (suspension) 1× (red card)	Palau Blaugrana, Barcelona; Attendance: 4,636; Referees: Bonaventura, Bonaventura (FRA)

1 December 2022; 20:45	HBC Nantes (France)	35–28	(Denmark) Aalborg Håndbold	H Arena, Nantes; Attendance: 5,902; Referees: Lah, Sok (SLO)
1 December 2022; 20:45	Cavalcanti 6	(18–12)	Hangaard 5	H Arena, Nantes; Attendance: 5,902; Referees: Lah, Sok (SLO)
1 December 2022; 20:45	1× (yellow card) 4× (suspension)	Report	2× (suspension) 1× (red card)	H Arena, Nantes; Attendance: 5,902; Referees: Lah, Sok (SLO)

7 December 2022; 18:45	OTP Bank - Pick Szeged (Hungary)	28–31	(Poland) Barlinek Industria Kielce	Pick Aréna, Szeged; Attendance: 6,500; Referees: Erdoğan, Özdeniz (TUR)
7 December 2022; 18:45	Bombač 6	(13–16)	Moryto 8	Pick Aréna, Szeged; Attendance: 6,500; Referees: Erdoğan, Özdeniz (TUR)
7 December 2022; 18:45	1× (yellow card) 1× (suspension)	Report	2× (yellow card) 4× (suspension)	Pick Aréna, Szeged; Attendance: 6,500; Referees: Erdoğan, Özdeniz (TUR)

7 December 2022; 18:45	Celje Pivovarna Laško (Slovenia)	29–26	(Norway) Elverum Håndball	Zlatorog Arena, Celje; Attendance: 1,350; Referees: Gubica, Milošević (CRO)
7 December 2022; 18:45	Vlah 11	(15–13)	Blomgren 6	Zlatorog Arena, Celje; Attendance: 1,350; Referees: Gubica, Milošević (CRO)
7 December 2022; 18:45	1× (yellow card) 4× (suspension)	Report	4× (suspension)	Zlatorog Arena, Celje; Attendance: 1,350; Referees: Gubica, Milošević (CRO)

8 December 2022; 18:45	THW Kiel (Germany)	37–33	(France) HBC Nantes	Wunderino Arena, Kiel; Attendance: 6,204; Referees: Kurtagic, Wetterwik (SWE)
8 December 2022; 18:45	Bilyk 10	(20–18)	Briet 6	Wunderino Arena, Kiel; Attendance: 6,204; Referees: Kurtagic, Wetterwik (SWE)
8 December 2022; 18:45	1× (yellow card) 5× (suspension)	Report	1× (yellow card) 4× (suspension)	Wunderino Arena, Kiel; Attendance: 6,204; Referees: Kurtagic, Wetterwik (SWE)

8 December 2022; 20:45	Barça (Spain)	32–26	(Denmark) Aalborg Håndbold	Palau Blaugrana, Barcelona; Attendance: 3,646; Referees: Brunner, Salah (SUI)
8 December 2022; 20:45	Mem 9	(15–16)	Claar 6	Palau Blaugrana, Barcelona; Attendance: 3,646; Referees: Brunner, Salah (SUI)
8 December 2022; 20:45	2× (suspension)	Report	3× (suspension)	Palau Blaugrana, Barcelona; Attendance: 3,646; Referees: Brunner, Salah (SUI)

14 December 2022; 18:45	Elverum Håndball (Norway)	32–34	(Hungary) OTP Bank - Pick Szeged	Terningen Arena, Elverum; Attendance: 1,626; Referees: Gasmi, Gasmi (FRA)
14 December 2022; 18:45	Anderson 7	(14–19)	Frimmel, Šoštarič 6	Terningen Arena, Elverum; Attendance: 1,626; Referees: Gasmi, Gasmi (FRA)
14 December 2022; 18:45	1× (yellow card) 3× (suspension)	Report	1× (suspension)	Terningen Arena, Elverum; Attendance: 1,626; Referees: Gasmi, Gasmi (FRA)

15 December 2022; 18:45	Barlinek Industria Kielce (Poland)	36–28	(Slovenia) Celje Pivovarna Laško	Hala Legionów, Kielce; Attendance: 4,200; Referees: Martins, Martins (POR)
15 December 2022; 18:45	Moryto 8	(18–15)	Ivanković 9	Hala Legionów, Kielce; Attendance: 4,200; Referees: Martins, Martins (POR)
15 December 2022; 18:45	3× (suspension)	Report	1× (yellow card) 6× (suspension)	Hala Legionów, Kielce; Attendance: 4,200; Referees: Martins, Martins (POR)

15 December 2022; 20:45	HBC Nantes (France)	33–37	(Spain) Barça	Hall XXL, Nantes; Attendance: 10,322; Referees: Schulze, Tönnies (GER)
15 December 2022; 20:45	Rivera Folch 5	(16–22)	Fabregas 8	Hall XXL, Nantes; Attendance: 10,322; Referees: Schulze, Tönnies (GER)
15 December 2022; 20:45	1× (yellow card) 3× (suspension)	Report	1× (yellow card) 1× (suspension)	Hall XXL, Nantes; Attendance: 10,322; Referees: Schulze, Tönnies (GER)

15 December 2022; 20:45	Aalborg Håndbold (Denmark)	26–30	(Germany) THW Kiel	Gigantium, Aalborg; Attendance: 5,020; Referees: Santos, Fonseca (POR)
15 December 2022; 20:45	Bjørnsen 8	(14–16)	Sagosen 6	Gigantium, Aalborg; Attendance: 5,020; Referees: Santos, Fonseca (POR)
15 December 2022; 20:45	2× (suspension)	Report	5× (suspension)	Gigantium, Aalborg; Attendance: 5,020; Referees: Santos, Fonseca (POR)

9 February 2023; 18:45	THW Kiel (Germany)	32–29	(Poland) Barlinek Industria Kielce	Wunderino Arena, Kiel; Attendance: 7,774; Referees: Elíasson, Pálsson (ISL)
9 February 2023; 18:45	Ekberg 8	(22–13)	Nahi 6	Wunderino Arena, Kiel; Attendance: 7,774; Referees: Elíasson, Pálsson (ISL)
9 February 2023; 18:45	1× (yellow card) 4× (suspension)	Report	2× (yellow card) 1× (suspension)	Wunderino Arena, Kiel; Attendance: 7,774; Referees: Elíasson, Pálsson (ISL)

9 February 2023; 18:45	Aalborg Håndbold (Denmark)	33–27	(Hungary) OTP Bank - Pick Szeged	Gigantium, Aalborg; Attendance: 4,685; Referees: Mažeika, Gatelis (LTU)
9 February 2023; 18:45	Barthold 8	(15–11)	Frimmel 6	Gigantium, Aalborg; Attendance: 4,685; Referees: Mažeika, Gatelis (LTU)
9 February 2023; 18:45	2× (yellow card) 4× (suspension)	Report	1× (yellow card) 4× (suspension)	Gigantium, Aalborg; Attendance: 4,685; Referees: Mažeika, Gatelis (LTU)

9 February 2023; 20:45	Barça (Spain)	40–30	(Norway) Elverum Håndball	Palau Blaugrana, Barcelona; Attendance: 1,872; Referees: Merz, Kuttler (GER)
9 February 2023; 20:45	Frade 7	(19–12)	three players 5	Palau Blaugrana, Barcelona; Attendance: 1,872; Referees: Merz, Kuttler (GER)
9 February 2023; 20:45	2× (suspension)	Report	3× (suspension)	Palau Blaugrana, Barcelona; Attendance: 1,872; Referees: Merz, Kuttler (GER)

9 February 2023; 20:45	HBC Nantes (France)	31–32	(Slovenia) Celje Pivovarna Laško	H Arena, Nantes; Attendance: 5,902; Referees: Covalciuc, Covalciuc (MDA)
9 February 2023; 20:45	Minne 8	(15–17)	Vlah 7	H Arena, Nantes; Attendance: 5,902; Referees: Covalciuc, Covalciuc (MDA)
9 February 2023; 20:45	5× (suspension)	Report	6× (suspension)	H Arena, Nantes; Attendance: 5,902; Referees: Covalciuc, Covalciuc (MDA)

15 February 2023; 18:45	Elverum Håndball (Norway)	36–42	(France) HBC Nantes	Terningen Arena, Elverum; Attendance: 1,553; Referees: Hansen, Madsen (DEN)
15 February 2023; 18:45	Grøndahl 9	(18–21)	Cavalcanti, Marchán 7	Terningen Arena, Elverum; Attendance: 1,553; Referees: Hansen, Madsen (DEN)
15 February 2023; 18:45	3× (suspension)	Report	3× (suspension) 1× (red card)	Terningen Arena, Elverum; Attendance: 1,553; Referees: Hansen, Madsen (DEN)

15 February 2023; 18:45	Celje Pivovarna Laško (Slovenia)	27–28	(Spain) Barça	Zlatorog Arena, Celje; Attendance: 5,207; Referees: Brkic, Jusufhodzic (AUT)
15 February 2023; 18:45	Marguč 8	(15–12)	Mem, Wanne 5	Zlatorog Arena, Celje; Attendance: 5,207; Referees: Brkic, Jusufhodzic (AUT)
15 February 2023; 18:45	1× (yellow card) 6× (suspension)	Report	1× (yellow card) 5× (suspension)	Zlatorog Arena, Celje; Attendance: 5,207; Referees: Brkic, Jusufhodzic (AUT)

15 February 2023; 18:45	Barlinek Industria Kielce (Poland)	33–28	(Denmark) Aalborg Håndbold	Hala Legionów, Kielce; Attendance: 4,200; Referees: Nikolov, Nachevski (MKD)
15 February 2023; 18:45	Moryto 6	(15–15)	Barthold, Sandell 6	Hala Legionów, Kielce; Attendance: 4,200; Referees: Nikolov, Nachevski (MKD)
15 February 2023; 18:45	1× (suspension)	Report	2× (suspension)	Hala Legionów, Kielce; Attendance: 4,200; Referees: Nikolov, Nachevski (MKD)

16 February 2023; 18:45	OTP Bank - Pick Szeged (Hungary)	36–33	(Germany) THW Kiel	Pick Aréna, Szeged; Attendance: 7,135; Referees: Marín, García (ESP)
16 February 2023; 18:45	Garciandia 6	(14–17)	Sagosen 7	Pick Aréna, Szeged; Attendance: 7,135; Referees: Marín, García (ESP)
16 February 2023; 18:45	1× (yellow card) 5× (suspension) 1× (red card)	Report	5× (suspension)	Pick Aréna, Szeged; Attendance: 7,135; Referees: Marín, García (ESP)

22 February 2023; 18:45	Aalborg Håndbold (Denmark)	31–24	(Norway) Elverum Håndball	Gigantium, Aalborg; Attendance: 4,830; Referees: Álvarez, Bustamante (ESP)
22 February 2023; 18:45	Claar 6	(17–12)	Blomgren 6	Gigantium, Aalborg; Attendance: 4,830; Referees: Álvarez, Bustamante (ESP)
22 February 2023; 18:45	1× (yellow card) 3× (suspension)	Report	1× (yellow card) 3× (suspension)	Gigantium, Aalborg; Attendance: 4,830; Referees: Álvarez, Bustamante (ESP)

22 February 2023; 18:45	THW Kiel (Germany)	39–27	(Slovenia) Celje Pivovarna Laško	Wunderino Arena, Kiel; Attendance: 7,803; Referees: Stark, Ştefan (ROU)
22 February 2023; 18:45	M. Landin 9	(17–15)	three players 5	Wunderino Arena, Kiel; Attendance: 7,803; Referees: Stark, Ştefan (ROU)
22 February 2023; 18:45	2× (suspension)	Report	1× (yellow card) 6× (suspension)	Wunderino Arena, Kiel; Attendance: 7,803; Referees: Stark, Ştefan (ROU)

22 February 2023; 20:45	Barça (Spain)	35–25	(Hungary) OTP Bank - Pick Szeged	Palau Blaugrana, Barcelona; Attendance: 2,480; Referees: Horáček, Novotný (CZE)
22 February 2023; 20:45	three players 5	(20–10)	Rosta 5	Palau Blaugrana, Barcelona; Attendance: 2,480; Referees: Horáček, Novotný (CZE)
22 February 2023; 20:45	1× (suspension)	Report		Palau Blaugrana, Barcelona; Attendance: 2,480; Referees: Horáček, Novotný (CZE)

23 February 2023; 20:45	HBC Nantes (France)	30–33	(Poland) Barlinek Industria Kielce	H Arena, Nantes; Attendance: 5,902; Referees: Caçador, Nicolau (POR)
23 February 2023; 20:45	Rivera Folch 7	(14–17)	Moryto, Sićko 6	H Arena, Nantes; Attendance: 5,902; Referees: Caçador, Nicolau (POR)
23 February 2023; 20:45	4× (suspension)	Report	5× (suspension)	H Arena, Nantes; Attendance: 5,902; Referees: Caçador, Nicolau (POR)

1 March 2023; 18:45	OTP Bank - Pick Szeged (Hungary)	28–28	(France) HBC Nantes	Pick Aréna, Szeged; Attendance: 5,042; Referees: Jørum, Kleven (NOR)
1 March 2023; 18:45	Rosta 7	(13–15)	Portela 5	Pick Aréna, Szeged; Attendance: 5,042; Referees: Jørum, Kleven (NOR)
1 March 2023; 18:45	3× (suspension)	Report	3× (suspension)	Pick Aréna, Szeged; Attendance: 5,042; Referees: Jørum, Kleven (NOR)

1 March 2023; 18:45	Elverum Håndball (Norway)	26–26	(Germany) THW Kiel	Terningen Arena, Elverum; Attendance: 2,130; Referees: Martins, Martins (POR)
1 March 2023; 18:45	Grøndahl 6	(11–12)	five players 3	Terningen Arena, Elverum; Attendance: 2,130; Referees: Martins, Martins (POR)
1 March 2023; 18:45	3× (suspension)	Report	1× (yellow card) 4× (suspension)	Terningen Arena, Elverum; Attendance: 2,130; Referees: Martins, Martins (POR)

1 March 2023; 18:45	Celje Pivovarna Laško (Slovenia)	31–34	(Denmark) Aalborg Håndbold	Zlatorog Arena, Celje; Attendance: 2,000; Referees: Gasmi, Gasmi (FRA)
1 March 2023; 18:45	three players 5	(15–19)	Pálmarsson 10	Zlatorog Arena, Celje; Attendance: 2,000; Referees: Gasmi, Gasmi (FRA)
1 March 2023; 18:45	1× (yellow card) 1× (suspension)	Report	1× (suspension)	Zlatorog Arena, Celje; Attendance: 2,000; Referees: Gasmi, Gasmi (FRA)

2 March 2023; 18:45	Barlinek Industria Kielce (Poland)	31–32	(Spain) Barça	Hala Legionów, Kielce; Attendance: 4,200; Referees: Bíró, Kiss (HUN)
2 March 2023; 18:45	Moryto 8	(12–13)	N'Guessan 6	Hala Legionów, Kielce; Attendance: 4,200; Referees: Bíró, Kiss (HUN)
2 March 2023; 18:45	1× (yellow card) 1× (suspension)	Report	2× (suspension)	Hala Legionów, Kielce; Attendance: 4,200; Referees: Bíró, Kiss (HUN)
