= 2022–23 SC Pick Szeged season =

Pick Szeged
2022–23 season
- President: Dr. Ernő Péter Szűcs
- Head coach: (Spain) Juan Carlos Pastor
- Nemzeti Bajnokság I: 1st
- Hungarian Cup: Pre-season
- EHF Champions League: Group stage
- Highest home attendance: 8,000 vs Barça (14 September 2022)
- Lowest home attendance: 1,000 vs Budakalász (2 September 2022)
Home colours	Away colours
- All statistics correct as of 29 September 2022.

The 2022–23 season was the 61st season in the history of SC Pick Szeged and their 47th consecutive season in the top flight. The club will participate in Nemzeti Bajnokság I, the Magyar Kupa and the EHF Champions League.

== Players ==
=== Squad information ===
Squad for the 2022–23 season.
As of 2 September 2022

Goalkeepers

- 16 (Hungary) Roland Mikler
- 32 (Croatia) Mirko Alilović

Left Wingers

- 25 (Austria) Sebastian Frimmel
- 71 (Norway) Alexander Blonz

Right Wingers

- 17 (Serbia) Bogdan Radivojević
- 24 (Slovenia) Mario Šoštarič

Line players

- 22 (Slovenia) Matej Gaber
- 27 (Hungary) Bence Bánhidi (c)
- 45 (Hungary) Miklós Rosta

Left Backs

- 9 (Hungary) Richárd Bodó
- 21 (Hungary) Zoltán Szita
- 51 (Slovenia) Borut Mačkovšek

Central Backs

- 10 (Portugal) Miguel Martins
- 44 (Slovenia) Dean Bombač

Right Backs

- 5 (Norway) Kent Robin Tønnesen
- 7 (Croatia) Luka Stepančić
- 41 (Spain) Imanol Garciandia

=== Transfers ===
Source: Rajt a K&H férfi ligában

IN

- (Hungary) Zoltán Szita (from (Poland) Wisła Płock)

OUT

- (Slovenia) Nik Henigman (to (France) Saint-Raphaël)
- (Hungary) Benjamin Szilágyi (loan to (Hungary) NEKA)
- (Hungary) Tibor Nagy (loan to (Hungary) Dabas)
- (Hungary) Bence Vetési (to (Hungary) Veszprém KKFT)

=== Staff members ===
Source: Staff (Szakmai stáb) - Pick Szeged 2022/2023

- Head Coach: (Spain) Juan Carlos Pastor
- Assistant Coach: (Serbia) Marko Krivokapić
- Goalkeeping Coach: (Serbia) Nenad Damjanović
- Fitness Coach: (Serbia) Slobodan Acimov
- Club Doctor: István Szabó MD
- Masseur: (Serbia) Đorđe Ignjatović

== Club ==
=== Management ===
Source: Management (Munkatársak)

Position	Staff member
The club
President	Dr. Ernő Péter Szűcs
Co-member	Attila Fülöp
Co-member	Sándor Fasimon
Co-member	Gábor Kolics
Senior team
Sports director	(Spain) Juan Carlos Pastor
Technical director	Iván Dobozi
Press chief	Róbert Süli
Secretary - General	Julianna Szilágyi
Director of marketing communication	Máté H. Nagy
Team manager	Ádám Ollár
Video analyst	Ferenc Szabó
International relations	Robin Borsos
International relations	Bettina Békefi
Company manager	Bence Kiss
Financial director	József Farkas
Youth team
Director	Vladan Jordović
Secretary	Éva Szanka
Technical director of PICK Academy	Krisztián Kárpáti

=== Uniform ===
- Supplier: Adidas
- Shirt sponsor (front): Pick / tippmix / OTP Bank / SMP Solutions
- Shirt sponsor (back): Groupama Biztosító / Lexus Szeged
- Shorts sponsor: Groupama Biztosító / OTP Bank / Lexus Szeged / Hajós Építész Iroda

== Pre-season ==
=== Friendly matches ===
10 August 2022	Pick Szeged	37–26	Balatonfüredi KSE	Pick Aréna - Ludányi Márton Sportcsarnok, Szeged; Attendance: 1,400
10 August 2022	Frimmel 6	(18–14)	Szűcs 8	Pick Aréna - Ludányi Márton Sportcsarnok, Szeged; Attendance: 1,400
10 August 2022		Report		Pick Aréna - Ludányi Márton Sportcsarnok, Szeged; Attendance: 1,400

12 August 2022	Pick Szeged	38–27	HE-DO B. Braun Gyöngyös	Pick Aréna - Ludányi Márton Sportcsarnok, Szeged; Attendance: 1,300
12 August 2022	Radivojević 8	(18–14)	Potisk 5	Pick Aréna - Ludányi Márton Sportcsarnok, Szeged; Attendance: 1,300
12 August 2022		Report		Pick Aréna - Ludányi Márton Sportcsarnok, Szeged; Attendance: 1,300

19 August 2022	Crvena zvezda (Serbia)	20–38	Pick Szeged	Sânnicolau Mare; Attendance: 600
19 August 2022		(10–19)	Frimmel 6	Sânnicolau Mare; Attendance: 600
19 August 2022		Report		Sânnicolau Mare; Attendance: 600

20 August 2022	Minaur Baia Mare (Romania)	26–31	Pick Szeged	Sânnicolau Mare; Attendance: 600
20 August 2022		(12–17)	Rosta 7	Sânnicolau Mare; Attendance: 600
20 August 2022		Report		Sânnicolau Mare; Attendance: 600

== Competitions ==
Times up to 30 October 2022 and from 26 March 2023 are CEST (UTC+2). Times from 30 October 2022 to 26 March 2023 are CET (UTC+1).

Win Draw Loss

=== Overview ===
Competition	First match	Last match	Starting round	Final position	Record							
Competition	First match	Last match	Starting round	Final position	Pld	W	D	L	GF	GA	GD	Win %
Nemzeti Bajnokság I	3 September 2022	-	Matchday 1	-	2	2	0	0	79	50	+29	100.00
Magyar Kupa	-	-	Fifth round	-	0	0	0	0	0	0	+0	—
EHF Champions League	15 September 2022	-	Group stage	-	0	0	0	0	0	0	+0	—
Total					2	2	0	0	79	50	+29	100.00

Last updated: 8 September 2022
Source: Flashscore

=== Nemzeti Bajnokság I ===
==== Regular season ====
===== Results by round =====
Round	1	2	3	4	5	6	7	8	9	10	11	12	13	14	15	16	17	18	19	20	21	22	23	24	25	26
Ground	H	H	H	A	H	A	H	H	A	H	A	H	A	A	A	A	H	A	A	A	H	H	A	H	A	H
Result	W	W	W	W	W	L	W	W																		

Updated to match(es) played on 8 September 2022. Source: Matches
A = Away; H = Home; W = Win; D = Draw; L = Loss; C = Cancelled

===== Matches =====
The league fixtures were announced on 5 July 2022.

Round 1; 3 September 2022; 18:00	Pick Szeged	40–25	CYEB-Budakalász	Pick Aréna, Szeged; Attendance: 1,000; Referees: Nagy, Túróczy
Round 1; 3 September 2022; 18:00	Rosta 7	(19–14)	Varjú 7	Pick Aréna, Szeged; Attendance: 1,000; Referees: Nagy, Túróczy
Round 1; 3 September 2022; 18:00	1× (yellow card) 3× (suspension)	Report	1× (yellow card) 4× (suspension)	Pick Aréna, Szeged; Attendance: 1,000; Referees: Nagy, Túróczy

Round 2; 8 September 2022; 18:00	Pick Szeged	39–25	HÉP-Cegléd	Pick Aréna, Szeged; Attendance: 2,000; Referees: G. Kiu, T. Kiu
Round 2; 8 September 2022; 18:00	Blonz 7	(21–10)	Kállai 6	Pick Aréna, Szeged; Attendance: 2,000; Referees: G. Kiu, T. Kiu
Round 2; 8 September 2022; 18:00	2× (yellow card) 1× (suspension)	Report	4× (yellow card) 1× (suspension)	Pick Aréna, Szeged; Attendance: 2,000; Referees: G. Kiu, T. Kiu

Round 3; 17 September 2022; 19:00	Pick Szeged	37–28	Balatonfüredi KSE	Pick Aréna, Szeged; Attendance: 1,500; Referees: Fekete, Tóth
Round 3; 17 September 2022; 19:00	three players 6	(20–12)	Szmetán 6	Pick Aréna, Szeged; Attendance: 1,500; Referees: Fekete, Tóth
Round 3; 17 September 2022; 19:00	3× (suspension)	Report	1× (yellow card) 3× (suspension)	Pick Aréna, Szeged; Attendance: 1,500; Referees: Fekete, Tóth

Round 4; 24 September 2022; 18:00	Dabas KC	26–37	Pick Szeged	OBO Aréna, Dabas; Attendance: 700; Referees: Héjja, Kónya
Round 4; 24 September 2022; 18:00	Horvat 6	(17–17)	Blonz 7	OBO Aréna, Dabas; Attendance: 700; Referees: Héjja, Kónya
Round 4; 24 September 2022; 18:00	1× (yellow card) 3× (suspension)	Report	1× (yellow card) 3× (suspension)	OBO Aréna, Dabas; Attendance: 700; Referees: Héjja, Kónya

Round 5; 1 October 2022; 19:30	Pick Szeged	39–33	Ferencvárosi TC	Pick Aréna, Szeged; Attendance: 2,000; Referees: Sándor, Szikszay
Round 5; 1 October 2022; 19:30	Rosta 13	(20–13)	Füzi, Prainer 6	Pick Aréna, Szeged; Attendance: 2,000; Referees: Sándor, Szikszay
Round 5; 1 October 2022; 19:30	2× (yellow card) 5× (suspension)	Report	2× (yellow card) 4× (suspension)	Pick Aréna, Szeged; Attendance: 2,000; Referees: Sándor, Szikszay

Round 6; 22 October 2022; 16:00	Telekom Veszprém	31–26	Pick Szeged	Veszprém Aréna, Veszprém; Attendance: 5,000; Referees: Andorka, Hucker
Round 6; 22 October 2022; 16:00	Vailupau 5	(16–10)	Blonz 7	Veszprém Aréna, Veszprém; Attendance: 5,000; Referees: Andorka, Hucker
Round 6; 22 October 2022; 16:00	1× (yellow card) 2× (suspension) 1× (red card)	Report	1× (yellow card) 1× (suspension) 1× (red card)	Veszprém Aréna, Veszprém; Attendance: 5,000; Referees: Andorka, Hucker

Round 7; 29 October 2022; 20:05	Pick Szeged	32–24	HE-DO B. Braun Gyöngyös	Pick Aréna, Szeged; Attendance: 1,600; Referees: G. Kiu, T. Kiu
Round 7; 29 October 2022; 20:05	Garciandia 8	(17–13)	Potisk 6	Pick Aréna, Szeged; Attendance: 1,600; Referees: G. Kiu, T. Kiu
Round 7; 29 October 2022; 20:05	1× (yellow card) 1× (suspension)	Report	1× (yellow card) 1× (suspension)	Pick Aréna, Szeged; Attendance: 1,600; Referees: G. Kiu, T. Kiu

Round 8; 6 November 2022; 16:00	Pick Szeged	32–30	MOL Tatabánya KC	Pick Aréna, Szeged; Attendance: 3,500; Referees: Nagy, Túróczy
Round 8; 6 November 2022; 16:00	Radivojević 8	(16–15)	Győri, Ancsin 6	Pick Aréna, Szeged; Attendance: 3,500; Referees: Nagy, Túróczy
Round 8; 6 November 2022; 16:00	2× (yellow card) 7× (suspension)	Report	1× (yellow card) 2× (suspension)	Pick Aréna, Szeged; Attendance: 3,500; Referees: Nagy, Túróczy

Round 9; 12 November 2022; 18:00	Fejér-B.Á.L. Veszprém	–	Pick Szeged	Városi Sportcsarnok, Veszprém; Referees: Hajdu, Halász
Round 9; 12 November 2022; 18:00		(–)		Városi Sportcsarnok, Veszprém; Referees: Hajdu, Halász
Round 9; 12 November 2022; 18:00		Report		Városi Sportcsarnok, Veszprém; Referees: Hajdu, Halász

Round 10; 26 November 2022; 16:00	Pick Szeged	–	HSA-NEKA	Pick Aréna, Szeged
Round 10; 26 November 2022; 16:00		(–)		Pick Aréna, Szeged
Round 10; 26 November 2022; 16:00		Report		Pick Aréna, Szeged

Round 11; 3 December 2022; 16:15	Budai Farkasok-Rév Group	–	Pick Szeged	Városi Uszoda és Sportcsarnok, Budaörs
Round 11; 3 December 2022; 16:15		(–)		Városi Uszoda és Sportcsarnok, Budaörs
Round 11; 3 December 2022; 16:15		Report		Városi Uszoda és Sportcsarnok, Budaörs

===== Results overview =====
Opposition	Home score	Away score	Double
Balatonfüredi KSE	37–28	25 Feb	-
Budai Farkasok-Rév Group	19 Nov	3 Dec	-
CYEB-Budakalász	40–25	11 Feb	-
HÉP-Cegléd	39–25	3 Feb	-
Csurgói KK	10 Dec	21 May	-
Dabas KK	4 Mar	26–37	-
Ferencvárosi TC	39–33	18 Mar	-
HE-DO B. Braun Gyöngyös	32–24	2 Apr	-
Sport36-Komló	26 May	17 Dec	-
HSA-NEKA	26 Nov	5 May	-
MOL Tatabánya KC	32–30	25 May	-
Telekom Veszprém	15 Apr	31–26	-
Fejér-B.Á.L. Veszprém	22 Apr	12 Nov	-

=== Magyar Kupa ===
Szeged entered the tournament in the fifth round.

=== EHF Champions League ===
==== Group stage ====
The draw was held on 1 July 2022 in Vienna, Austria.

Pos	Team	Pld	W	D	L	GF	GA	GD	Pts	Qualification	BAR	KIE	NAN	THW	AAL	SZE	CEL	ELV
1	(Spain) Barça	14	13	1	0	484	404	+80	27	Quarterfinals	—	32–28	34–29	26–24	32–26	35–25	38–30	40–30
2	(Poland) Barlinek Industria Kielce	14	11	0	3	465	427	+38	22	Quarterfinals	31–32	—	40–33	40–37	33–28	37–30	36–28	37–33
3	(France) HBC Nantes	14	7	1	6	478	451	+27	15 (Note: Nantes 71–67 Kiel)	Playoffs	33–37	30–33	—	38–30	35–28	35–30	31–32	41–30
4	(Germany) THW Kiel	14	6	3	5	460	440	+20	15	Playoffs	30–30	32–29	37–33	—	36–36	34–29	39–27	36–26
5	(Denmark) Aalborg Håndbold	14	6	1	7	445	438	+7	13	Playoffs	33–39	28–30	33–34	26–30	—	33–27	36–32	31–24
6	(Hungary) OTP Bank - Pick Szeged	14	5	1	8	426	452	−26	11	Playoffs	28–35	28–31	28–28	36–33	29–41	—	36–27	30–23
7	(Slovenia) Celje Pivovarna Laško	14	3	0	11	412	475	−63	6		27–28	30–33	24–35	38–36	31–34	28–36	—	29–26
8	(Norway) Elverum Håndball	14	1	1	12	398	481	−83	3		30–46	26–27	36–42	26–26	25–33	32–34	31–29	—

Source: EHF
Rules for classification: Tiebreakers
Notes:

14 September 2022; 18:45	Pick Szeged	28–35	(Spain) Barça	Pick Aréna, Szeged; Attendance: 8,000; Referees: Lah, Sok (SLO)
14 September 2022; 18:45	Bodó 5	(15–14)	Fabregas, Mem 7	Pick Aréna, Szeged; Attendance: 8,000; Referees: Lah, Sok (SLO)
14 September 2022; 18:45	1× (yellow card) 1× (suspension)	Report	5× (suspension)	Pick Aréna, Szeged; Attendance: 8,000; Referees: Lah, Sok (SLO)

22 September 2022; 18:45	HBC Nantes (France)	35–30	Pick Szeged	H Arena, Nantes; Attendance: 5,629; Referees: Gubica, Milošević (CRO)
22 September 2022; 18:45	Rivera 10	(17–15)	Radivojević 9	H Arena, Nantes; Attendance: 5,629; Referees: Gubica, Milošević (CRO)
22 September 2022; 18:45	1× (yellow card) 5× (suspension)	Report	2× (suspension)	H Arena, Nantes; Attendance: 5,629; Referees: Gubica, Milošević (CRO)

29 September 2022; 18:45	THW Kiel (Germany)	34–29	Pick Szeged	Wunderino Arena, Kiel; Attendance: 5,316; Referees: Santos, Fonseca (POR)
29 September 2022; 18:45	Ekberg 6	(15–14)	Rosta 5	Wunderino Arena, Kiel; Attendance: 5,316; Referees: Santos, Fonseca (POR)
29 September 2022; 18:45	4× (suspension)	Report	1× (yellow card) 3× (suspension)	Wunderino Arena, Kiel; Attendance: 5,316; Referees: Santos, Fonseca (POR)

6 October 2022; 18:45	Pick Szeged	29–41	(Denmark) Aalborg Håndbold	Pick Aréna, Szeged; Attendance: 3,000; Referees: Bonaventura, Bonaventura (FRA)
6 October 2022; 18:45	Šoštarič 6	(15–17)	Hansen 11	Pick Aréna, Szeged; Attendance: 3,000; Referees: Bonaventura, Bonaventura (FRA)
6 October 2022; 18:45	1× (yellow card) 5× (suspension)	Report	2× (suspension)	Pick Aréna, Szeged; Attendance: 3,000; Referees: Bonaventura, Bonaventura (FRA)

26 October 2022; 18:45	Pick Szeged	30–23	(Norway) Elverum	Pick Aréna, Szeged; Attendance: 4,000; Referees: Martins, Martins (POR)
26 October 2022; 18:45	Rosta, Tønnesen 6	(16–10)	Blomgren 4	Pick Aréna, Szeged; Attendance: 4,000; Referees: Martins, Martins (POR)
26 October 2022; 18:45	1× (yellow card) 4× (suspension)	Report	3× (suspension)	Pick Aréna, Szeged; Attendance: 4,000; Referees: Martins, Martins (POR)

3 November 2022; 20:45	Łomża Industria Kielce (Poland)	37–30	Pick Szeged	Hala Legionów, Kielce; Attendance: 4,200; Referees: Hansen, Madsen (DEN)
3 November 2022; 20:45	Moryto, Sićko 7	(22–14)	three players 5	Hala Legionów, Kielce; Attendance: 4,200; Referees: Hansen, Madsen (DEN)
3 November 2022; 20:45	4× (suspension)	Report	4× (suspension)	Hala Legionów, Kielce; Attendance: 4,200; Referees: Hansen, Madsen (DEN)

===== Results overview =====
Opposition	Home score	Away score	Double
(Spain) Barça	28–35	22 Feb	-
(Slovenia) Celje Pivovarna Laško	23 Nov	30 Nov	-
(Poland) Łomża Industria Kielce	7 Dec	37–30	-
(Germany) THW Kiel	15 Feb	34–29	-
(France) HBC Nantes	1 Mar	35–30	-
(Norway) Elverum	30–23	14 Dec	-
(Denmark) Aalborg Håndbold	29–41	8 Feb	-

== Statistics ==
=== Top scorers ===
Includes all competitive matches. The list is sorted by shirt number when total goals are equal. Last updated on 8 September 2022.

Position	Nation	No.	Name	Hungarian League	Hungarian Cup	Champions League	Total
1	(Austria)	25	Sebastian Frimmel	10	0	0	10
2	(Hungary)	45	Miklós Rosta	9	0	0	9
3	(Norway)	71	Alexander Blonz	8	0	0	8
4	(Norway)	5	Kent Robin Tønnesen	6	0	0	6
5	(Hungary)	9	Richárd Bodó	6	0	0	6
6	(Portugal)	10	Miguel Martins	6	0	0	6
7	(Hungary)	21	Zoltán Szita	6	0	0	6
8	(Slovenia)	24	Mario Šoštarić	6	0	0	6
9	(Hungary)	27	Bence Bánhidi	5	0	0	5
10	(Spain)	41	Imanol Garciandia	5	0	0	5
11	(Hungary)	16	Roland Mikler	3	0	0	3
12	(Serbia)	17	Bogdan Radivojević	3	0	0	3
13	(Slovenia)	44	Dean Bombač	2	0	0	2
14	(Slovenia)	51	Borut Mačkovšek	2	0	0	2
15	(Hungary)	29	Marcell Ludmán	1	0	0	1
16	(Hungary)	55	Levente Tisza	1	0	0	1
			TOTALS	79	0	0	79

=== Attendances ===
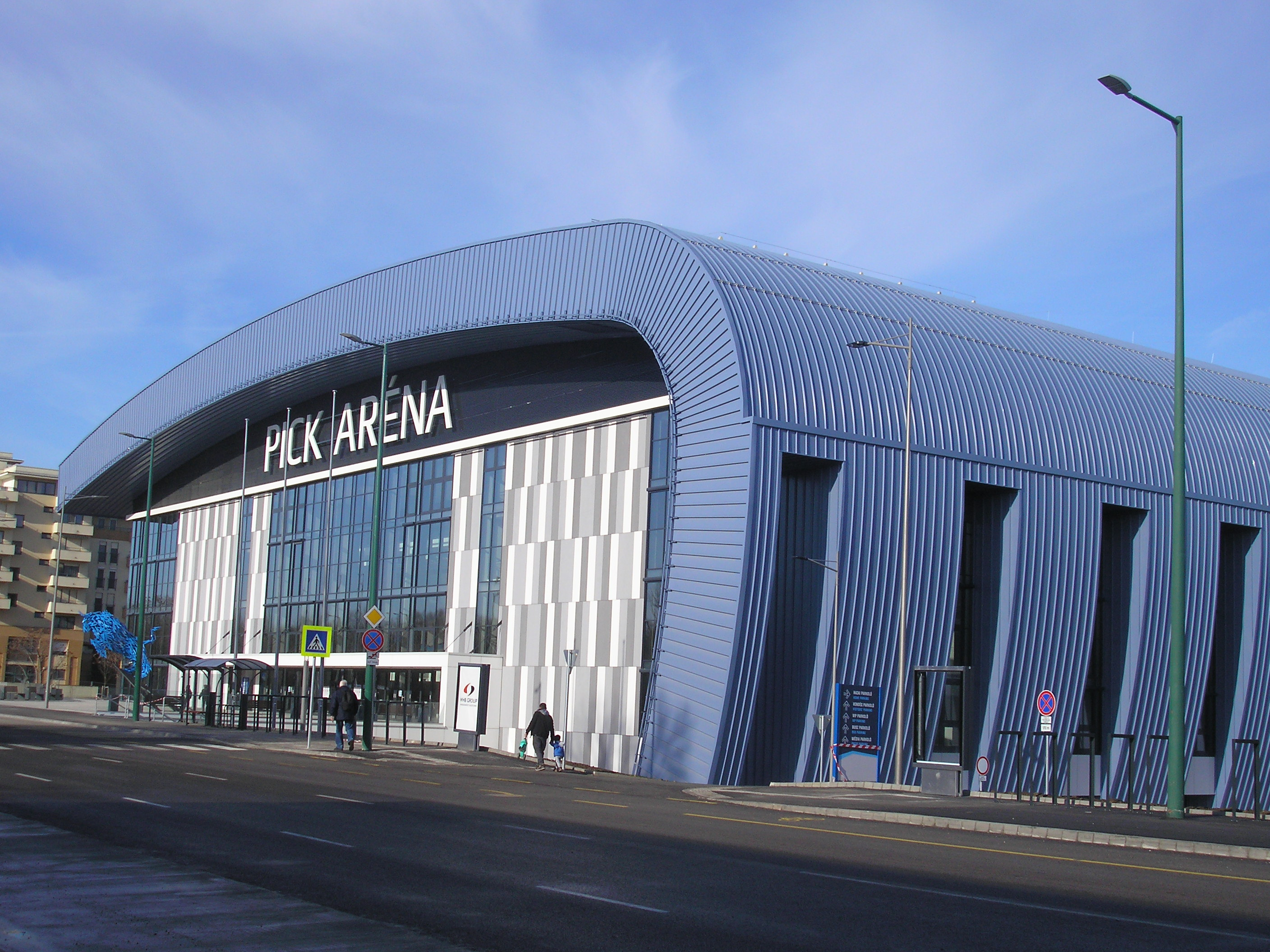
Home hall: Pick Aréna

List of the home matches:

Round	Against	Attadance	Capatility	Date
NB I – 1.	CYEB-Budakalász	1,000	12.3%	September 1, 2022
NB I – 2.	HÉP-Cegléd	2,000	24.6%	September 1, 2022
CL – (GS) 1.	(Spain) Barça	8,000	96.4%	September 15, 2022
NB I – 3.	Balatonfüredi KSE	1,500	18.4%	September 17, 2022
NB I – 5.	Ferencvárosi TC	2,000	24.6%	October 1, 2022
CL – (GS) 4.	(Denmark) Aalborg Håndbold	3,000	36.1%	October 6, 2022
CL – (GS) 5.	(Norway) Elverum	4,000	48.2%	October 26, 2022
NB I – 7.	HE-DO B. Braun Gyöngyös	1,600	19.6%	October 29, 2022
NB I – 8.	MOL Tatabánya KC	3,500	43.0%	November 6, 2022
NB I – 24.	Budai Farkasok-Rév Group			November 19, 2022
CL – (GS) 7.	(Slovenia) Celje Pivovarna Laško			November 23, 2022
NB I – 10.	HSA-NEKA			November 26, 2022
CL – (GS) 9.	(Poland) Łomża Industria Kielce			December 7, 2022
NB I – 12.	Csurgói KK			December 10, 2022
