= 2022–23 EHF Champions League knockout stage =

The 2022–23 EHF Champions League knockout stage began on 22 March with the playoffs and ended on 18 June 2023 with the final at the Lanxess Arena in Cologne, Germany, to decide the winners of the 2022–23 EHF Champions League. A total of twelve teams competed in the knockout phase.

== Format ==
In the playoffs, the eight teams ranked 3rd–6th in Groups A and B played against each other in two-legged home-and-away matches. The four winning teams advanced to the quarterfinals, where they were joined by the top-two teams of Groups A and B for another round of two-legged home-and-away matches. The four quarterfinal winners qualified for the final four tournament at the Lanxess Arena in Cologne, Germany.

== Qualified teams ==
The top six teams from Groups A and B qualified for the knockout stage.

Group	Qualified for quarterfinals		Qualified for playoffs			
Group	First place	Second place	Third place	Fourth place	Fifth place	Sixth place
A	(France) Paris Saint-Germain	(Germany) SC Magdeburg	(Hungary) Telekom Veszprém	(Denmark) GOG Håndbold	(Romania) Dinamo București	(Poland) Orlen Wisła Płock
B	(Spain) Barça	(Poland) Barlinek Industria Kielce	(France) HBC Nantes	(Germany) THW Kiel	(Denmark) Aalborg Håndbold	(Hungary) OTP Bank - Pick Szeged

All times are UTC+2 (matches on 22 and 23 March are UTC+1).

== Playoffs ==
=== Overview ===
Team 1	Agg.	Team 2	1st leg	2nd leg
OTP Bank - Pick Szeged (Hungary)	56–74	(Hungary) Telekom Veszprém	23–36	33–38
Orlen Wisła Płock (Poland)	57–57; 5–4 (p)	(France) HBC Nantes	32–32	25–25
Aalborg Håndbold (Denmark)	54–60	(Denmark) GOG Håndbold	30–28	24–32
Dinamo București (Romania)	60–72	(Germany) THW Kiel	28–41	32–31

==== Matches ====
22 March 2023; 18:45	OTP Bank - Pick Szeged (Hungary)	23–36	(Hungary) Telekom Veszprém	Pick Aréna, Szeged; Attendance: 7,700; Referees: Elíasson, Pálsson (ISL)
22 March 2023; 18:45	Radivojević 6	(7–20)	Marguč 11	Pick Aréna, Szeged; Attendance: 7,700; Referees: Elíasson, Pálsson (ISL)
22 March 2023; 18:45	1× (yellow card) 2× (suspension)	Report	1× (yellow card) 4× (suspension) 1× (red card)	Pick Aréna, Szeged; Attendance: 7,700; Referees: Elíasson, Pálsson (ISL)

30 March 2023; 18:45	Telekom Veszprém (Hungary)	38–33	(Hungary) OTP Bank - Pick Szeged	Veszprém Aréna, Veszprém; Attendance: 5,000; Referees: Bonaventura, Bonaventura (FRA)
30 March 2023; 18:45	Lauge 9	(17–16)	Garciandia 10	Veszprém Aréna, Veszprém; Attendance: 5,000; Referees: Bonaventura, Bonaventura (FRA)
30 March 2023; 18:45	3× (suspension)	Report	1× (yellow card) 4× (suspension)	Veszprém Aréna, Veszprém; Attendance: 5,000; Referees: Bonaventura, Bonaventura (FRA)

Telekom Veszprém won 74–56 on aggregate.

22 March 2023; 20:45	Orlen Wisła Płock (Poland)	32–32	(France) HBC Nantes	Orlen Arena, Płock; Attendance: 4,500; Referees: Nikolov, Nachevski (MKD)
22 March 2023; 20:45	Lučin, Zhitnikov 6	(14–18)	Rivera Folch 10	Orlen Arena, Płock; Attendance: 4,500; Referees: Nikolov, Nachevski (MKD)
22 March 2023; 20:45	1× (yellow card) 3× (suspension)	Report	3× (suspension)	Orlen Arena, Płock; Attendance: 4,500; Referees: Nikolov, Nachevski (MKD)

29 March 2023
20:45
HBC Nantes (France)
29–30
(Poland) Orlen Wisła Płock
H Arena, Nantes
Attendance: 5,902
Referees: Kurtagic, Wetterwik (SWE)
Minne 9
(14–11)
Kosorotov, Lučin 5
1× (yellow card) 5× (suspension)
Report
1× (yellow card) 4× (suspension)

FT: 25–25 Pen: 4–5

57–57 on aggregate. Orlen Wisła Płock won 5–4 on penalties.

23 March 2023; 18:45	Aalborg Håndbold (Denmark)	30–28	(Denmark) GOG Håndbold	Gigantium, Aalborg; Attendance: 5,020; Referees: Konjičanin, Konjičanin (BIH)
23 March 2023; 18:45	Munk 6	(16–12)	Madsen 9	Gigantium, Aalborg; Attendance: 5,020; Referees: Konjičanin, Konjičanin (BIH)
23 March 2023; 18:45	3× (suspension)	Report	2× (suspension)	Gigantium, Aalborg; Attendance: 5,020; Referees: Konjičanin, Konjičanin (BIH)

30 March 2023; 20:45	GOG Håndbold (Denmark)	32–24	(Denmark) Aalborg Håndbold	Arena Fyn, Odense; Attendance: 4,000; Referees: Jørum, Kleven (NOR)
30 March 2023; 20:45	Pytlick 8	(15–11)	Claar 7	Arena Fyn, Odense; Attendance: 4,000; Referees: Jørum, Kleven (NOR)
30 March 2023; 20:45	3× (suspension) 1× (red card)	Report	1× (yellow card) 6× (suspension) 1× (red card)	Arena Fyn, Odense; Attendance: 4,000; Referees: Jørum, Kleven (NOR)

GOG Håndbold won 60–54 on aggregate.

22 March 2023; 18:45	Dinamo București (Romania)	28–41	(Germany) THW Kiel	Polyvalent Hall, Bucharest; Attendance: 4,503; Referees: Horáček, Novotný (CZE)
22 March 2023; 18:45	Kašpárek, Kuduz 6	(11–19)	three players 6	Polyvalent Hall, Bucharest; Attendance: 4,503; Referees: Horáček, Novotný (CZE)
22 March 2023; 18:45	1× (suspension)	Report	3× (suspension)	Polyvalent Hall, Bucharest; Attendance: 4,503; Referees: Horáček, Novotný (CZE)

29 March 2023; 18:45	THW Kiel (Germany)	31–32	(Romania) Dinamo București	Wunderino Arena, Kiel; Attendance: 5,621; Referees: Jurinović, Mrvica (CRO)
29 March 2023; 18:45	Ekberg 9	(16–17)	Kuduz 5	Wunderino Arena, Kiel; Attendance: 5,621; Referees: Jurinović, Mrvica (CRO)
29 March 2023; 18:45	1× (suspension)	Report	1× (suspension)	Wunderino Arena, Kiel; Attendance: 5,621; Referees: Jurinović, Mrvica (CRO)

THW Kiel won 72–60 on aggregate.

== Quarterfinals ==
=== Overview ===
Team 1	Agg.	Team 2	1st leg	2nd leg
THW Kiel (Germany)	56–63	(France) Paris Saint-Germain	27–31	29–32
GOG Håndbold (Denmark)	61–73	(Spain) Barça	30–37	31–36
Orlen Wisła Płock (Poland)	50–52	(Germany) SC Magdeburg	22–22	28–30
Telekom Veszprém (Hungary)	56–60	(Poland) Barlinek Industria Kielce	29–29	27–31

==== Matches ====
10 May 2023; 20:45	THW Kiel (Germany)	27–31	(France) Paris Saint-Germain	Wunderino Arena, Kiel; Attendance: 9,821; Referees: Mažeika, Gatelis (LTU)
10 May 2023; 20:45	Sagosen 9	(12–13)	four players 6	Wunderino Arena, Kiel; Attendance: 9,821; Referees: Mažeika, Gatelis (LTU)
10 May 2023; 20:45	2× (yellow card) 5× (suspension) 1× (red card)	Report	1× (yellow card) 6× (suspension) 1× (red card)	Wunderino Arena, Kiel; Attendance: 9,821; Referees: Mažeika, Gatelis (LTU)

17 May 2023; 20:45	Paris Saint-Germain (France)	32–29	(Germany) THW Kiel	Stade Pierre de Coubertin, Paris; Attendance: 3,185; Referees: Hansen, Madsen (DEN)
17 May 2023; 20:45	Krištopāns 6	(17–15)	Ekberg, Øverby 5	Stade Pierre de Coubertin, Paris; Attendance: 3,185; Referees: Hansen, Madsen (DEN)
17 May 2023; 20:45	4× (suspension)	Report	3× (suspension)	Stade Pierre de Coubertin, Paris; Attendance: 3,185; Referees: Hansen, Madsen (DEN)

Paris Saint-Germain won 63–56 on aggregate.

11 May 2023; 20:45	GOG Håndbold (Denmark)	30–37	(Spain) Barça	Arena Fyn, Odense; Attendance: 4,000; Referees: Brunner, Salah (SUI)
11 May 2023; 20:45	Madsen 9	(15–19)	Cindrić 9	Arena Fyn, Odense; Attendance: 4,000; Referees: Brunner, Salah (SUI)
11 May 2023; 20:45	2× (yellow card) 3× (suspension)	Report	2× (suspension)	Arena Fyn, Odense; Attendance: 4,000; Referees: Brunner, Salah (SUI)

18 May 2023; 20:45	Barça (Spain)	36–31	(Denmark) GOG Håndbold	Palau Blaugrana, Barcelona; Attendance: 4,000; Referees: Schulze, Tönnies (GER)
18 May 2023; 20:45	Frade 6	(20–13)	Madsen 5	Palau Blaugrana, Barcelona; Attendance: 4,000; Referees: Schulze, Tönnies (GER)
18 May 2023; 20:45		Report	1× (yellow card) 2× (suspension)	Palau Blaugrana, Barcelona; Attendance: 4,000; Referees: Schulze, Tönnies (GER)

Barça won 73–61 on aggregate.

10 May 2023; 18:45	Orlen Wisła Płock (Poland)	22–22	(Germany) SC Magdeburg	Orlen Arena, Płock; Attendance: 5,460; Referees: Gubica, Milošević (CRO)
10 May 2023; 18:45	Kosorotov, Mihić 4	(9–12)	Damgaard 8	Orlen Arena, Płock; Attendance: 5,460; Referees: Gubica, Milošević (CRO)
10 May 2023; 18:45	3× (suspension)	Report	1× (yellow card) 3× (suspension)	Orlen Arena, Płock; Attendance: 5,460; Referees: Gubica, Milošević (CRO)

17 May 2023; 18:45	SC Magdeburg (Germany)	30–28	(Poland) Orlen Wisła Płock	GETEC Arena, Magdeburg; Attendance: 6,300; Referees: Pavićević, Ražnatović (MNE)
17 May 2023; 18:45	Smits 14	(13–13)	Kosorotov 8	GETEC Arena, Magdeburg; Attendance: 6,300; Referees: Pavićević, Ražnatović (MNE)
17 May 2023; 18:45	1× (yellow card) 5× (suspension)	Report	3× (suspension)	GETEC Arena, Magdeburg; Attendance: 6,300; Referees: Pavićević, Ražnatović (MNE)

SC Magdeburg won 52–50 on aggregate.

11 May 2023; 18:45	Telekom Veszprém (Hungary)	29–29	(Poland) Barlinek Industria Kielce	Veszprém Aréna, Veszprém; Attendance: 5,221; Referees: Marín, García (ESP)
11 May 2023; 18:45	El-Deraa, Štrlek 6	(13–16)	A. Dujshebaev 6	Veszprém Aréna, Veszprém; Attendance: 5,221; Referees: Marín, García (ESP)
11 May 2023; 18:45	5× (suspension)	Report	1× (yellow card) 2× (suspension)	Veszprém Aréna, Veszprém; Attendance: 5,221; Referees: Marín, García (ESP)

18 May 2023; 18:45	Barlinek Industria Kielce (Poland)	31–27	(Hungary) Telekom Veszprém	Hala Legionów, Kielce; Attendance: 4,200; Referees: Lah, Sok (SLO)
18 May 2023; 18:45	A. Dujshebaev, Sićko 6	(18–12)	Remili 7	Hala Legionów, Kielce; Attendance: 4,200; Referees: Lah, Sok (SLO)
18 May 2023; 18:45	4× (suspension)	Report	1× (yellow card) 5× (suspension) 1× (red card)	Hala Legionów, Kielce; Attendance: 4,200; Referees: Lah, Sok (SLO)

Barlinek Industria Kielce won 60–56 on aggregate.

== Final four ==
The final four was held at the Lanxess Arena in Cologne, Germany on 17 and 18 June 2023. The draw took place on 23 May 2023.

=== Bracket ===
Semi-finals
17 June
(Germany) SC Magdeburg (pen.)	38 (2)
(Spain) Barça	38 (1)
17 June
(France) Paris Saint-Germain	24
(Poland) Barlinek Industria Kielce	25

Final
18 June
(Germany) SC Magdeburg (ET)	30
(Poland) Barlinek Industria Kielce	29
Third place
18 June
(Spain) Barça	37
(France) Paris Saint-Germain	31

=== Semifinals ===
17 June 2023
15:15
SC Magdeburg (Germany)
40–39 (ET)
(Spain) Barça
Lanxess Arena, Cologne
Attendance: 19,450
Referees: Elíasson, Pálsson (ISL)
Smits 12
(16–18)
N'Guessan 9
2× (yellow card) 7× (suspension) 1× (red card)
Report
1× (yellow card) 3× (suspension)

FT: 31–31 ET: 7–7 Pen: 2–1

17 June 2023; 18:00	Paris Saint-Germain (France)	24–25	(Poland) Barlinek Industria Kielce	Lanxess Arena, Cologne; Attendance: 19,750; Referees: Horáček, Novotný (CZE)
17 June 2023; 18:00	Steins 6	(14–16)	A. Dujshebaev 6	Lanxess Arena, Cologne; Attendance: 19,750; Referees: Horáček, Novotný (CZE)
17 June 2023; 18:00	3× (suspension)	Report	3× (suspension)	Lanxess Arena, Cologne; Attendance: 19,750; Referees: Horáček, Novotný (CZE)

=== Third place game ===
18 June 2023; 15:15	Barça (Spain)	37–31	(France) Paris Saint-Germain	Lanxess Arena, Cologne; Attendance: 19,450; Referees: Jørum, Kleven (NOR)
18 June 2023; 15:15	Janc 7	(22–13)	N'Tanzi, Syprzak 7	Lanxess Arena, Cologne; Attendance: 19,450; Referees: Jørum, Kleven (NOR)
18 June 2023; 15:15		Report		Lanxess Arena, Cologne; Attendance: 19,450; Referees: Jørum, Kleven (NOR)

=== Final ===
18 June 2023
18:00
SC Magdeburg (Germany)
30–29 (ET)
(Poland) Barlinek Industria Kielce
Lanxess Arena, Cologne
Attendance: 19,750
Referees: Lah, Sok (SLO)
Smits 8
(13–15)
A. Dujshebaev 8
2× (yellow card) 5× (suspension) 1× (red card)
Report
1× (yellow card) 4× (suspension)

FT: 26–26 ET: 4–3
