= Alexandre Cavalcanti =

Portuguese handball player (born 1996)

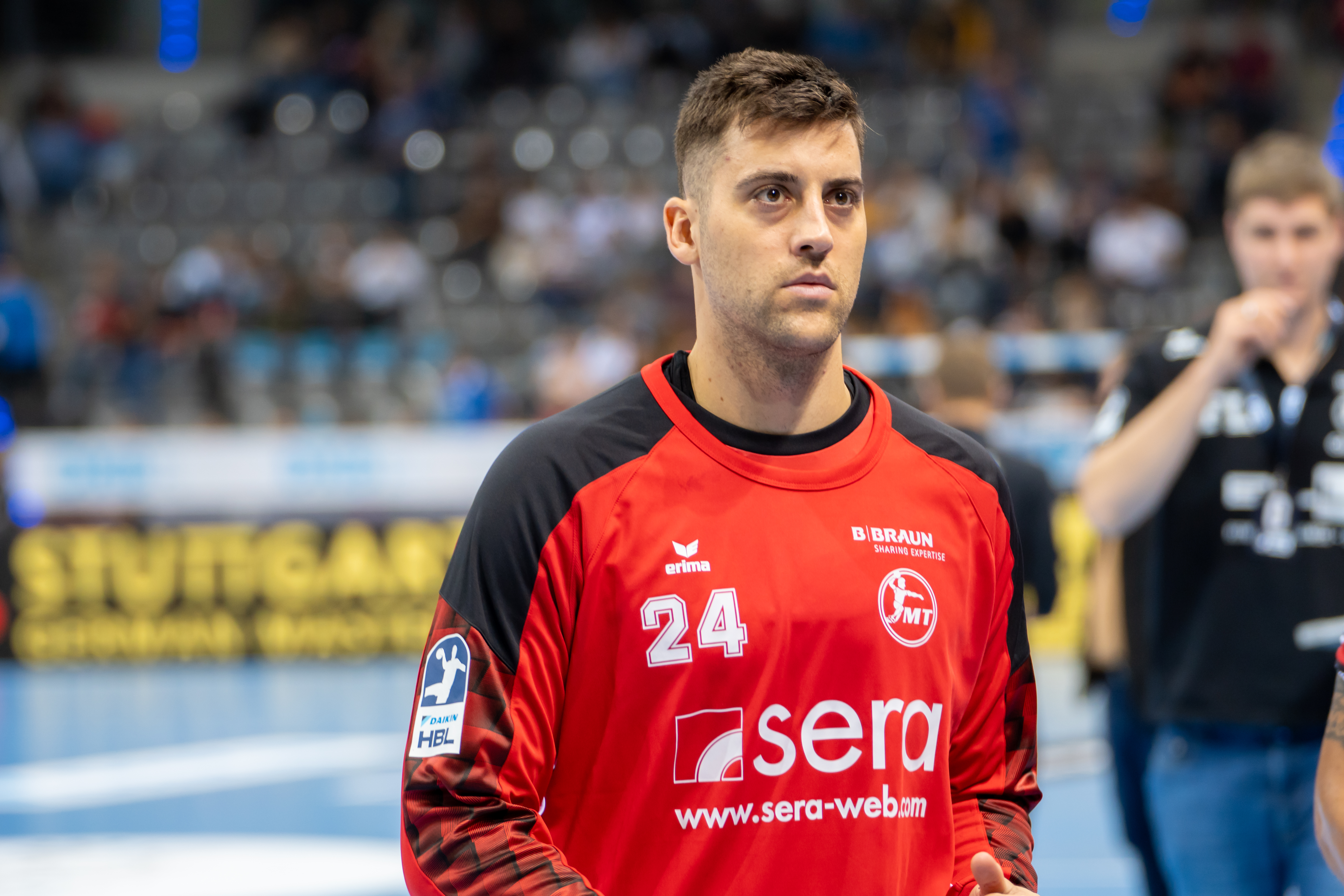

Personal information
- Full name: Alexandre de Oliveira Cavalcanti
- Nationality: Portuguese
- Born: 27 December 1996 (age 29) Almada, Portugal
- Height: 2.03 m (6 ft 8 in)

Sport
- Sport: Handball
- Position: Left back
- Current club: MT Melsungen
- Number: 24

Youth career
- Years: Team
- 2013–2015: S.L. Benfica

Senior clubs
- Years: Team
- 2013–2015: S.L. Benfica B
- 2014–2019: S.L. Benfica
- 2019–2024: HBC Nantes
- 2024–2026: MT Melsungen
National team
Years	Team	Apps	(Gls)
2016–	Portugal	74	(95)
- Updated on 5 July 2024

Alexandre de Oliveira Cavalcanti (born 27 December 1996) is a Portuguese handballer for MT Melsungen and the Portuguese national team.

He represented Portugal at the 2020 European Men's Handball Championship. In 2025 he was part of the Portugal team that reached the semifinals of the World Championship for the first time in history. They lost the semifinals to Denmark and the third place playoff to France. At the 2026 European Men's Handball Championship he was part of the Portugal team that got 5th place, their best ever finish at a European Championship.

== Honours ==
Benfica

- Portuguese Cup: 2015–16, 2017–18
- Portuguese Super Cup: 2016–17, 2018–19

Nantes

- Coupe de France: 2022–23
- Coupe de la Ligue: 2021–22

Melsungen

- EHF European League Champion 2025-2026
