= Jack Thurin =

Swedish handball player (born 1999)

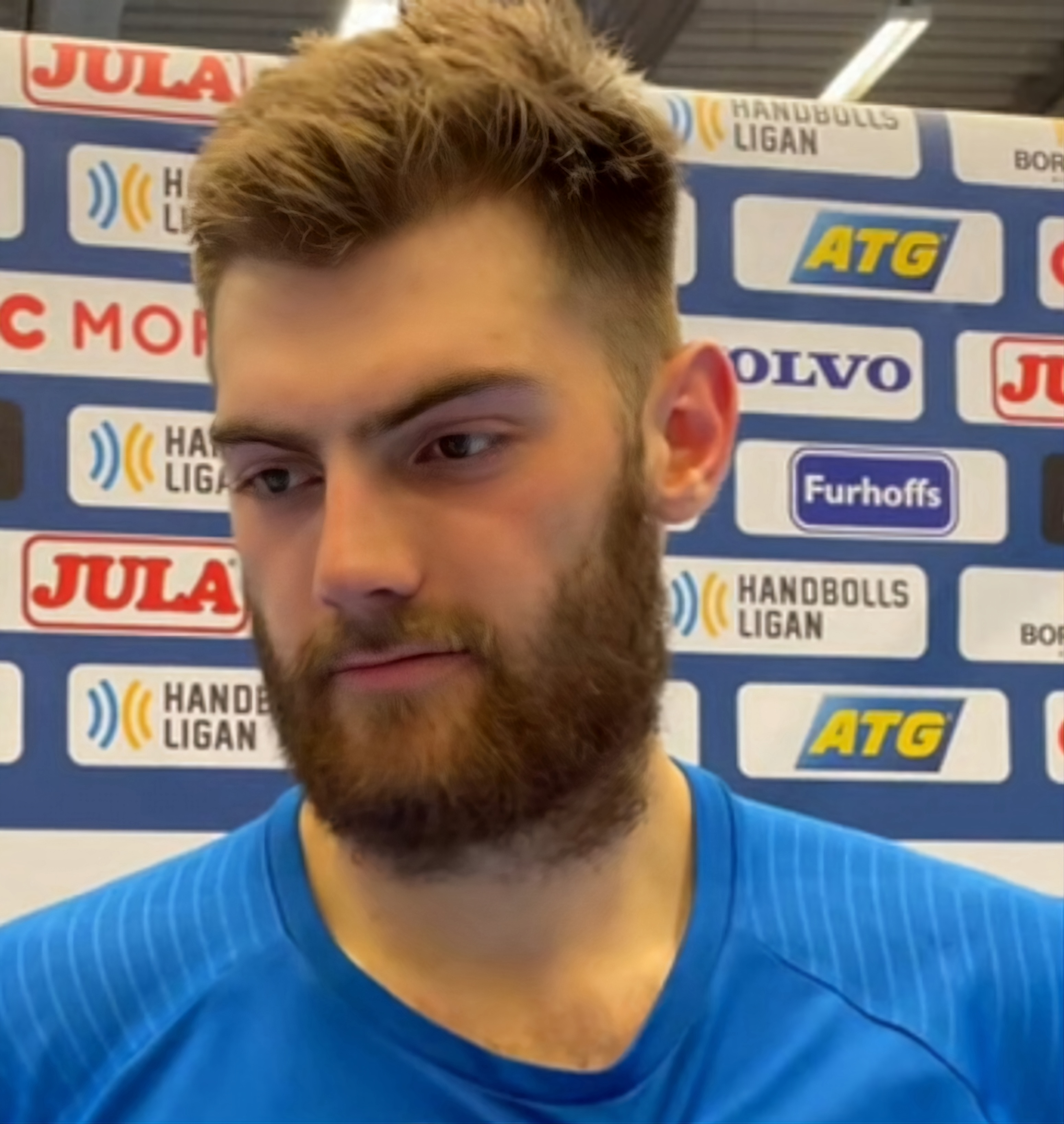

Personal information
- Nationality: Swedish
- Born: 9 June 1999 (age 27) Skövde, Sweden
- Height: 1.99 m (6 ft 6 in)

Sport
- Sport: Handball
- Position: Right back
- Current club: Montpellier Handball
- Number: 15

Senior clubs
- Years: Team
- –2022: IFK Skövde
- 2022–2023: FC Porto
- 2023–2025: Aalborg Håndbold
- 2025–: Montpellier Handball
National team
Years	Team	Apps	(Gls)
2019–	Sweden	11	(17)
Medal record
World Championship
Silver medal – second place	2021 Egypt

Jack Thurin (born 9 June 1999) is a Swedish handball player for Montpellier Handball and the Swedish national team.

He made his international debut on the Swedish national team in March 2019.

He participated at the 2020 European Men's Handball Championship in Sweden.

In 2025 he won the Danish Cup with Aalborg Håndbold, beating Bjerringbro-Silkeborg in the final. Later the same season he won the Danish championship.

== Honours ==
- Portuguese League:
  - Gold: 2023
- EHF Champions League:
  - Silver: 2024
- Danish League:
  - Gold: 2025
- Danish Cup
  - Gold: 2025

=== Individual awards ===
- All-Star Team Swedish League 2021/2022
