= 2022–23 EHF Champions League =

Handball tournament

EHF Champions League
- 2022–23

Tournament information
- Sport: Handball
- Location: Lanxess Arena (FINAL4)
- Dates: 14 September 2022–18 June 2023
- Teams: 16
- Website: ehfcl.com

Final positions
- Champions: (Germany) SC Magdeburg
- Runner-up: (Poland) Barlinek Industria Kielce

Tournament statistics
- Matches played: 132
- Goals scored: 8230 (62.35 per match)
- Attendance: 587,183 (4,448 per match)
- Top scorer(s): (Denmark) Emil Wernsdorf Madsen (107 goals)

The 2022–23 EHF Champions League was the 63rd edition of Europe's premier club handball tournament and the 30th edition under the current EHF Champions League format. It ran from 14 September 2022 to 18 June 2023.

SC Magdeburg defeated Barlinek Industria Kielce 30–29 in the final to capture their fourth title.

== Format ==
The tournament used the same format as the previous two seasons. The competition began with a group stage featuring sixteen teams divided into two groups. Matches were played in a double round-robin system with home-and-away fixtures, fourteen in total for each team. In Groups A and B, the top two teams automatically qualified for the quarter-finals, with teams ranked 3rd to 6th entered the playoff round.

The knockout stage included four rounds: the playoffs, quarter-finals, and a final-four tournament comprising two semifinals and the final. In the playoffs, eight teams were paired against each other in two-legged home-and-away matches (third-placed in group A plays sixth-placed group B; fourth-placed group A plays fifth-placed group B, etc.). The four aggregate winners of the playoffs advanced to the quarterfinals, joining the top-two teams of Groups A and B. The eight quarterfinalist teams were paired against each other in two-legged home-and-away matches, with the four aggregate winners qualifying to the final-four tournament.

In the final four tournament, the semifinals and the final were played as single matches at a pre-selected host venue. For this tournament, it was the Lanxess Arena.

== Teams ==
Location of teams of the 2022–23 EHF Champions League group stage.
Red: Group A; Blue: Group B.

There were ten guaranteed places, with the six additional spots being awarded as wildcards by the EHF. The league winners of Germany, France, Spain, Hungary, Denmark, North Macedonia, Poland, Portugal and Romania qualified for the group stage automatically. 22 teams applied for a place. Teams which have qualified for the 2022–23 EHF European League will have the opportunity to apply for an upgrade to the EHF Champions League. The final list was announced in June 2022.

Participating teams
(Germany) SC Magdeburg (1st)	(Spain) Barça (1st)	(France) Paris Saint-Germain (1st)	(Hungary) OTP Bank - Pick Szeged (1st)
(Denmark) GOG Håndbold (1st)	(Poland) Barlinek Industria Kielce (1st)	(Portugal) FC Porto (1st)	(Romania) Dinamo București (1st)
(Germany) THW Kiel (2nd)	(France) HBC Nantes (WC)	(Hungary) Telekom Veszprém (WC)	(Denmark) Aalborg Håndbold (WC)
(Poland) Orlen Wisła Płock (WC)	(Croatia) PPD Zagreb (WC)	(Slovenia) Celje Pivovarna Laško (WC)	(Norway) Elverum Håndball (WC)

- RK Vardar, who were originally to qualify as winners of the 2021–22 Macedonian Handball Super League, were removed from EHF competitions for this season due to financial issues.

Wildcard rejection
(Spain) BM Granollers	(Portugal) Sporting CP	(Romania) CS Minaur Baia Mare	(Switzerland) Kadetten Schaffhausen
(Sweden) Ystads IF	(Ukraine) HC Motor Zaporizhzhia		

== Group stage ==
The draw for the group stage was held on 1 July 2022. The 16 teams were drawn into four groups of four. From each pot, two teams were drawn into Group A and the other two in Group B. Teams from the same national association will not drawn into the same group.

A total of 11 national associations were represented in the group stage.

=== Group A ===
Pos	Team	Pld	W	D	L	GF	GA	GD	Pts	Qualification	PAR	MAG	VES	GOG	BUC	PLO	ZAG	POR
1	(France) Paris Saint-Germain	14	12	0	2	492	439	+53	24	Quarterfinals	—	33–37	37–35	41–36	33–26	37–33	40–31	32–30
2	(Germany) SC Magdeburg	14	9	2	3	453	419	+34	20	Quarterfinals	22–29	—	32–25	36–34	34–33	33–27	35–25	41–36
3	(Hungary) Telekom Veszprém	14	8	2	4	449	429	+20	18	Playoffs	36–35	35–35	—	36–37	33–30	32–22	32–28	32–30
4	(Denmark) GOG Håndbold	14	7	1	6	459	454	+5	15	Playoffs	30–35	33–32	30–31	—	38–38	31–24	33–29	34–33
5	(Romania) Dinamo București	14	5	3	6	416	429	−13	13	Playoffs	29–36	28–30	31–31	30–27	—	32–27	27–27	32–27
6	(Poland) Orlen Wisła Płock	14	4	1	9	374	412	−38	9	Playoffs	26–32	25–24	26–30	31–27	26–28	—	26–30	27–23
7	(Croatia) PPD Zagreb	14	3	2	9	390	420	−30	8		30–33	25–31	29–26	27–31	28–29	26–26	—	29–23
8	(Portugal) FC Porto	14	2	1	11	407	438	−31	5		33–35	31–31	28–35	26–33	32–23	27–28	28–26	—

Source: EHF
Rules for classification: Tiebreakers

=== Group B ===
Pos	Team	Pld	W	D	L	GF	GA	GD	Pts	Qualification	BAR	KIE	NAN	THW	AAL	SZE	CEL	ELV
1	(Spain) Barça	14	13	1	0	484	404	+80	27	Quarterfinals	—	32–28	34–29	26–24	32–26	35–25	38–30	40–30
2	(Poland) Barlinek Industria Kielce	14	11	0	3	465	427	+38	22	Quarterfinals	31–32	—	40–33	40–37	33–28	37–30	36–28	37–33
3	(France) HBC Nantes	14	7	1	6	478	451	+27	15 (Note: Nantes 71–67 Kiel)	Playoffs	33–37	30–33	—	38–30	35–28	35–30	31–32	41–30
4	(Germany) THW Kiel	14	6	3	5	460	440	+20	15	Playoffs	30–30	32–29	37–33	—	36–36	34–29	39–27	36–26
5	(Denmark) Aalborg Håndbold	14	6	1	7	445	438	+7	13	Playoffs	33–39	28–30	33–34	26–30	—	33–27	36–32	31–24
6	(Hungary) OTP Bank - Pick Szeged	14	5	1	8	426	452	−26	11	Playoffs	28–35	28–31	28–28	36–33	29–41	—	36–27	30–23
7	(Slovenia) Celje Pivovarna Laško	14	3	0	11	412	475	−63	6		27–28	30–33	24–35	38–36	31–34	28–36	—	29–26
8	(Norway) Elverum Håndball	14	1	1	12	398	481	−83	3		30–46	26–27	36–42	26–26	25–33	32–34	31–29	—

Source: EHF
Rules for classification: Tiebreakers

== Knockout stage ==
=== Playoffs ===
Team 1	Agg.	Team 2	1st leg	2nd leg
OTP Bank - Pick Szeged (Hungary)	56–74	(Hungary) Telekom Veszprém	23–36	33–38
Orlen Wisła Płock (Poland)	57–57; 5–4 (p)	(France) HBC Nantes	32–32	25–25
Aalborg Håndbold (Denmark)	54–60	(Denmark) GOG Håndbold	30–28	24–32
Dinamo București (Romania)	60–72	(Germany) THW Kiel	28–41	32–31

=== Quarterfinals ===
Team 1	Agg.	Team 2	1st leg	2nd leg
THW Kiel (Germany)	56–63	(France) Paris Saint-Germain	27–31	29–32
GOG Håndbold (Denmark)	61–73	(Spain) Barça	30–37	31–36
Orlen Wisła Płock (Poland)	50–52	(Germany) SC Magdeburg	22–22	28–30
Telekom Veszprém (Hungary)	56–60	(Poland) Barlinek Industria Kielce	29–29	27–31

=== Final four ===
The final four was held at the Lanxess Arena in Cologne, Germany on 17 and 18 June 2023.

==== Bracket ====
Semi-finals
17 June
(Germany) SC Magdeburg (pen.)	38 (2)
(Spain) Barça	38 (1)
17 June
(France) Paris Saint-Germain	24
(Poland) Barlinek Industria Kielce	25

Final
18 June
(Germany) SC Magdeburg (ET)	30
(Poland) Barlinek Industria Kielce	29
Third place
18 June
(Spain) Barça	37
(France) Paris Saint-Germain	31

==== Final ====
18 June 2023
18:00
SC Magdeburg (Germany)
30–29 (ET)
(Poland) Barlinek Industria Kielce
Lanxess Arena, Cologne
Attendance: 19,750
Referees: Lah, Sok (SLO)
Smits 8
(13–15)
A. Dujshebaev 8
2× (yellow card) 5× (suspension) 1× (red card)
Report
1× (yellow card) 4× (suspension)

FT: 26–26 ET: 4–3

== Top goalscorers ==
Rank	Player	Club	Goals
1	(Denmark) Emil Wernsdorf Madsen	(Denmark) GOG Håndbold	107
2	(Poland) Kamil Syprzak	(France) Paris Saint-Germain	103
3	(Poland) Arkadiusz Moryto	(Poland) Barlinek Industria Kielce	100
4	(Netherlands) Kay Smits	(Germany) SC Magdeburg	98
5	(Denmark) Simon Pytlick	(Denmark) GOG Håndbold	94
6	(Slovenia) Aleks Vlah	(Slovenia) Celje Pivovarna Laško	88
7	(Iceland) Gísli Þorgeir Kristjánsson	(Germany) SC Magdeburg	87
7	(France) Dika Mem	(Spain) Barça	87
9	(France) Elohim Prandi	(France) Paris Saint-Germain	86
10	(Denmark) Lukas Jørgensen	(Denmark) GOG Håndbold	84
10	(Latvia) Dainis Krištopāns	(France) Paris Saint-Germain	84
10	(Denmark) Rasmus Lauge	(Hungary) Telekom Veszprém	84
