= Andrii Akimenko =

Ukrainian handball player

Personal information
- Nationality: Ukrainian
- Born: 12 June 1994 (age 32) Zaporizhzhia, Ukraine
- Height: 1.90 m (6 ft 3 in)

Sport
- Sport: Handball
- Position: Right wing
- Current club: CS Dinamo București
- Number: 55

Senior clubs
- Years: Team
- 2014-2020: ZTR Zaporozhye
- 2020-2022: KS Azoty-Puławy
- 2022-: CS Dinamo București
National team
Years	Team	Apps	(Gls)
–	Ukraine	35	(73)

Andrii Akimenko (born 12 June 1994) is a Ukrainian handball player for CS Dinamo București and the Ukrainian national team.

He represented Ukraine at the 2020 European Men's Handball Championship.
