= Tin Lučin =

Croatian handball player (born 1999)

Personal information
- Nationality: Croatian
- Born: 16 August 1999 (age 27) Rijeka, Croatia
- Height: 1.96 m (6 ft 5 in)

Sport
- Sport: Handball
- Position: Left back
- Current club: RK Nexe Našice
- Number: 41

Youth career
- Years: Team
- –: RK Zamet
- –2015: Kozala

Senior clubs
- Years: Team
- 2015–2016: Kozala
- 2016–2017: RK Zamet
- 2017–2018: RK Zagreb
- 2018–2019: RK Zamet
- 2019–2021: Abanca Ademar León
- 2021–2024: Wisła Płock
- 2024–: RK Nexe Našice
National team
Years	Team	Apps	(Gls)
2021–	Croatia	63	(175)
Medal record
Representing Croatia
Men's handball
World Championship
Silver medal – second place	2025 Croatia/Denmark/Norway
European Championship
Bronze medal – third place	2026 Denmark/Norway/Sweden
European U-18 Championship
Silver medal – second place	2016 Croatia
- Updated on 2 February 2026

Tin Lučin (born 16 August 1999) is a Croatian handball player who plays for RK Nexe Našice and the Croatian national team.

Lučin started his senior career playing for Kozala then Zamet in Croatian Premier Handball League and EHF Cup matches. After one season with Zamet he joined PPD Zagreb where he also stayed for one season due to lack of playing time.

== Honours ==
Zagreb

- Premier League: 2017–18
- Croatian Cup: 2018

Wisła Płock

- Polish Cup: 2022, 2023, 2024
- EHF European League bronze medalist: 2022
