= Sergei Kosorotov (handballer) =

Russian handball player

Personal information
- Full name: Sergei Mark Kosorotov
- Nationality: Russian
- Born: 16 June 1999 (age 27) Moscow, Russia
- Height: 2.00 m (6 ft 7 in)

Sport
- Sport: Handball
- Position: Left back
- Current club: ONE Veszprém
- Number: 99

Senior clubs
- Years: Team
- 2017–2021: Chekhovskiye Medvedi
- 2021–2023: Wisła Płock
- 2023–2025: ONE Veszprém
- 2025–: Wisła Płock
National team
Years	Team	Apps	(Gls)
2017–	Russia	48	(47)
- Updated on 1 October 2022

Sergei Mark Kosorotov (born 16 June 1999) is a Russian handball player for ONE Veszprém and the Russian national team.

He represented Russia at the 2019 and 2021 World Men's Handball Championship.

== Honours ==
- Polish Cup: 2022, 2023
- Russian Handball Super League: 2018, 2019, 2020, 2021
- Russian Cup: 2018, 2019, 2020, 2021
- EHF European League: Bronze medalist 2022
- Hungarian Cup: 2024
