= Kent Robin Tønnesen =

Norwegian handball player (born 1991)

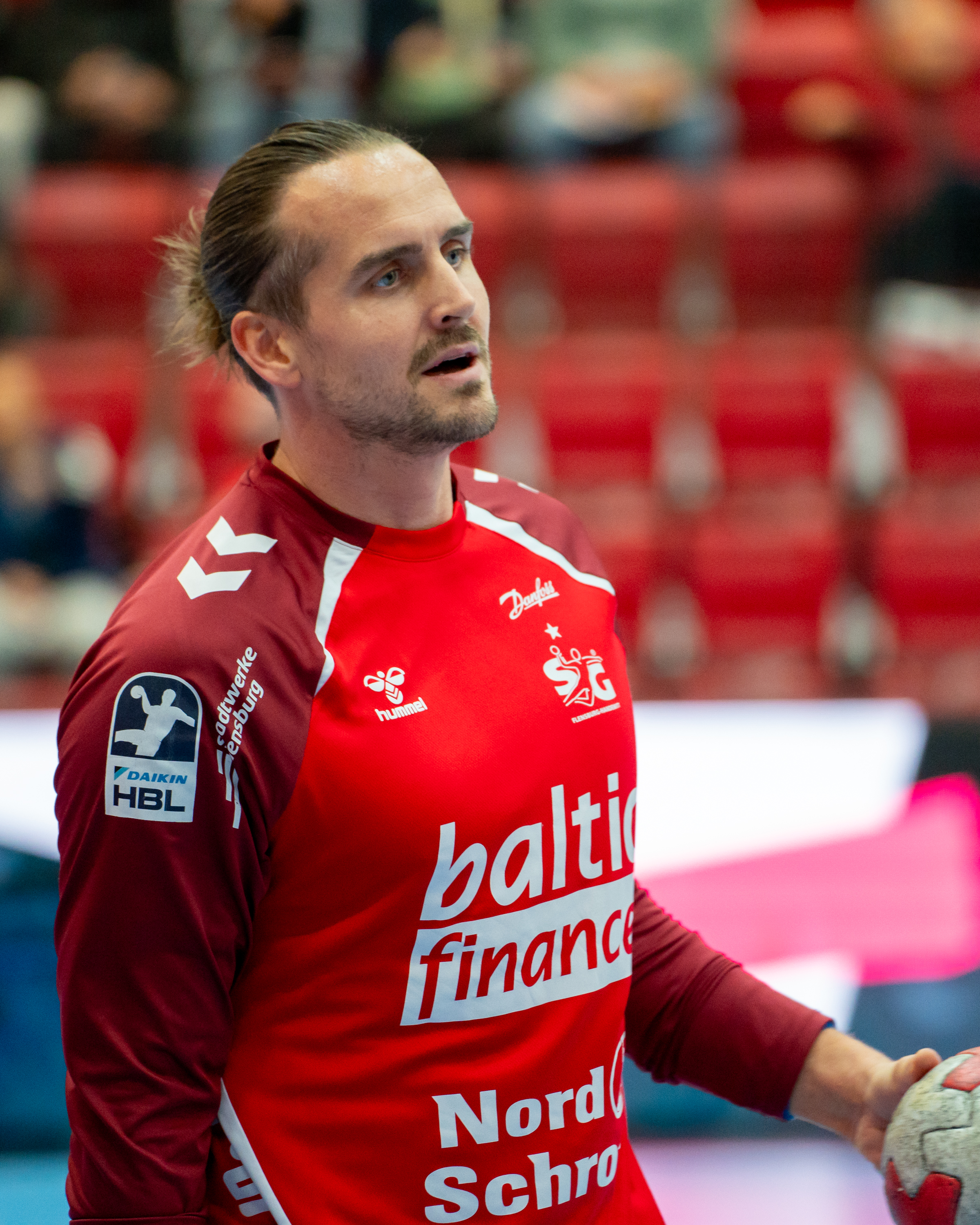

Personal information
- Nationality: Norwegian
- Born: 5 June 1991 (age 35) Partille, Sweden
- Height: 1.95 m (6 ft 5 in)

Sport
- Sport: Handball
- Position: Right back
- Current club: SG Flensburg-Handewitt
- Number: 23

Senior clubs
- Years: Team
- –: Fjellhammer IL
- –2012: Haslum HK
- 2012–2013: IK Sävehof
- 2013–2015: HSG Wetzlar
- 2015–2017: Füchse Berlin
- 2017–2021: Telekom Veszprém
- 2021–2023: SC Pick Szeged
- 2023–2025: Paris Saint-Germain
- 2025–: SG Flensburg-Handewitt
National team
| Years | Team | Apps | (Gls) |
| 2010–2025 | Norway | 148 | (360) |
Medal record
World Championship
| Silver medal – second place | 2017 France |

Kent Robin Tønnesen (born 5 June 1991) is a Norwegian handball player for SG Flensburg-Handewitt and the Norwegian national team.

== Honours ==
- World Championship:
  - Silver: 2017
