= Bogdan Radivojević =

Serbian handball player (born 1993)

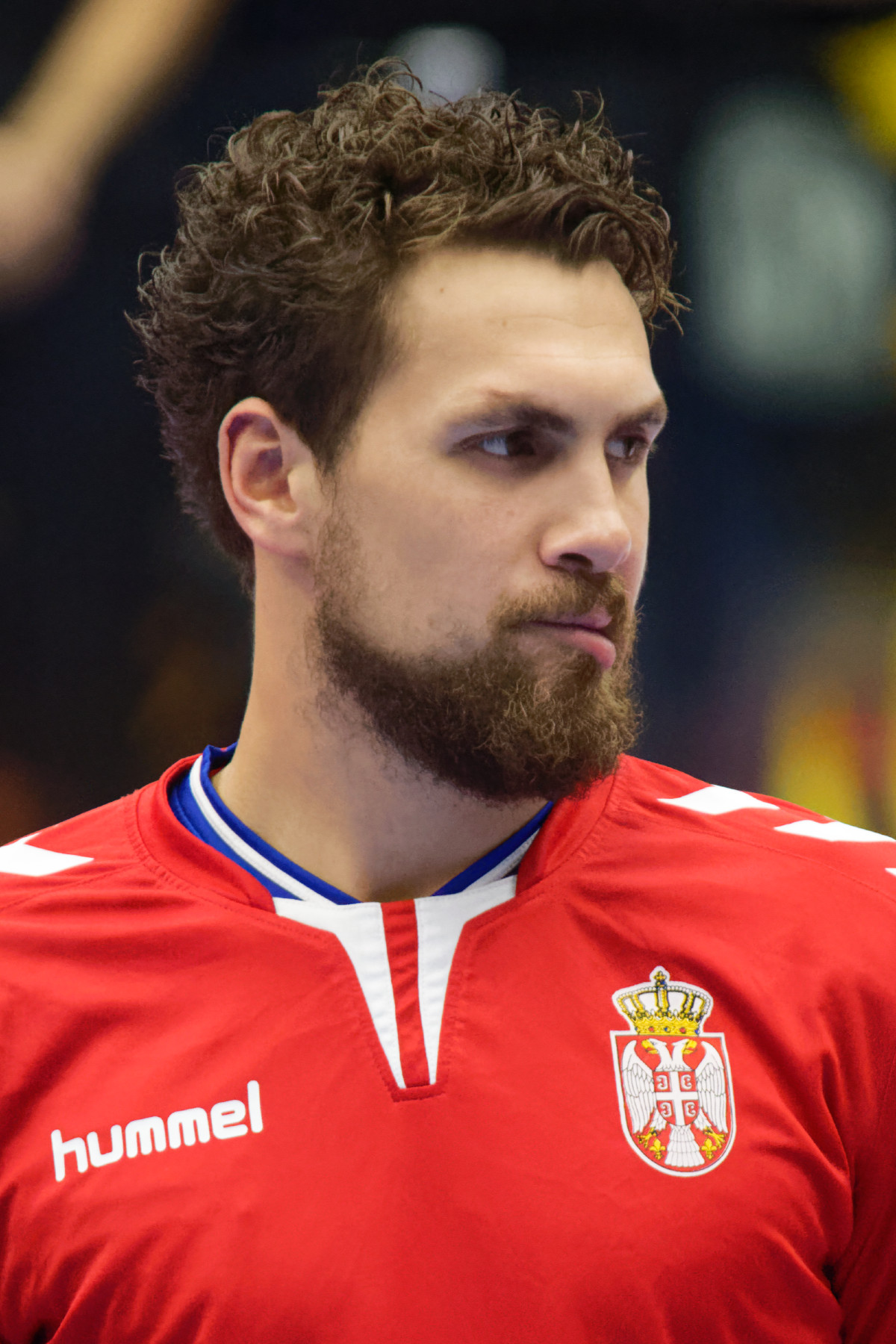
- Radivojević in 2017

Personal information
- Nationality: Serbian
- Born: 2 March 1993 (age 33) Smederevska Palanka, Serbia, FR Yugoslavia
- Height: 1.92 m (6 ft 4 in)

Sport
- Sport: Handball
- Position: Right wing
- Current club: Beşiktaş
- Number: 17

Youth career
- Years: Team
- –: Sinđelić Beograd
- –: Partizan

Senior clubs
- Years: Team
- 2010–2013: Partizan
- 2013–2017: Flensburg-Handewitt
- 2017–2019: Rhein-Neckar Löwen
- 2019–2023: Pick Szeged
- 2023–2026: Eurofarm Pelister
- 2026–present: Beşiktaş
National team
Years	Team	Apps	(Gls)
2012–present	Serbia	82	(233)
- Updated on 17 December 2023

Bogdan Radivojević (Serbian Cyrillic: Богдан Радивојевић; born 2 March 1993) is a Serbian handball player for Beşiktaş. He also represents the Serbian national team.

== Club career ==
Radivojević made his senior debut for Partizan in the 2010–11 season, as the team won the league title. He later moved abroad to Germany and signed with SG Flensburg-Handewitt, helping the club win the 2013–14 EHF Champions League.

== International career ==
A Serbia international since 2012, Radivojević participated in two World Championships (2013 and 2019) and three European Championships (2014, 2018 and 2020).

== Personal life ==
His partner is Jelena Despotović, who is also a handball player. Their daughter was born in August 2022.

== Honours ==
Partizan

- Handball League of Serbia: 2010–11, 2011–12

SG Flensburg-Handewitt

- DHB-Pokal: 2014–15
- DHB-Supercup: 2013
- EHF Champions League: 2013–14

Rhein-Neckar Löwen

- DHB-Pokal: 2017–18
- DHB-Supercup: 2017, 2018

RK Eurofarm Pelister (North Macedonia)

- Macedonian Handball Super League

Winner Gold:2024, 2025
