= Merkur Ostseehalle =

Multi-purpose arena in Kiel, Germany

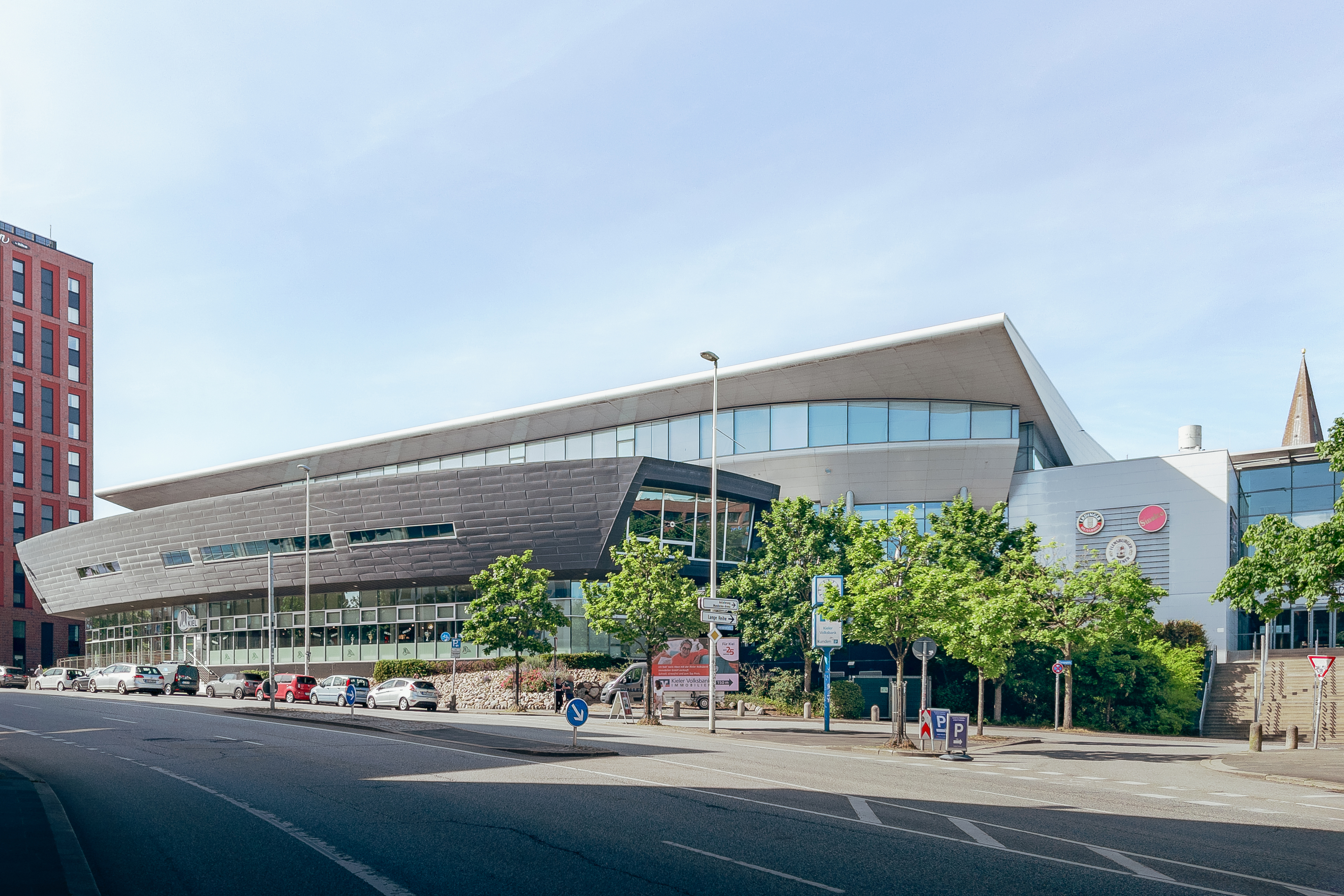
- South view of venue (2026)
- Interactive map of Merkur Ostseehalle
- Full name: Merkur Ostseehalle
- Former names: Ostseehalle (1951–2007), Sparkassen-Arena (2008–2020), Wunderino Arena (2020–2026)
- Address: Europapl. 1; 24103 Kiel, Germany
- Location: Vorstadt
- Coordinates: 54°19′14″N 10°07′50″E
- Owner: Kieler Nachrichten; Citti Handelsgesellschaft
- Operator: Konzert- und Veranstaltungsgesellschaft mbH & Co. KG Kiel
- Capacity: 13,500 (concerts); 10,250 (handball)

Construction
- Groundbreaking: 10 November 1950
- Opened: 17 June 1951
- Renovated: 2001
- Architects: Wilhelm Neveling; Büro Schnittger (renovation)

Tenant
- THW Kiel (HBL)

The Merkur Ostseehalle is an indoor arena, in Kiel, Germany. It is primarily used by THW Kiel (team handball) and as a venue for rock/pop concerts. It holds up to 13,500 people.

== History ==
Construction was determined in 1950 by the Kiel council meeting. The Osteseehalle was initiated on 17 June 1951, during the Kiel Week and was eventually finished in 1952. For this purpose, the steel construction of a retired airplane hangar, from an airbase on the island Sylt, was dismantled and brought to Kiel.

Over the course of decades, the arena was constantly redeveloped, and since renovations finished in September 2001, it is now "prepared for the next 50 years", according to the operators. On 1 January 2008, the Sparkassen-Finanzgruppe purchased the naming rights. On 1 July 2020, the name changed to Wunderino Arena. In April 2026, the naming rights were acquired by the Merkur Group and the arena was renamed to the Merkur Ostseehalle.

On 16 April 2002, Irish vocal pop band Westlife held a concert for their World of Our Own Tour supporting their album World of Our Own.

== See also ==
- List of indoor arenas in Germany
