= 2020–21 EHF Champions League group stage =

The 2020–21 EHF Champions League group stage began on 16 September 2020 and concluded on 4 March 2021.

== Draw ==
The draw was held on 1 July 2020 in Vienna, Austria.

=== Seeding ===
The composition of the seeding pots for the group stage draw was announced on 22 June 2020. From each pot, two teams were drawn into Group A and the other two in Group B. Teams from the same national association were not drawn into the same group.

Seeding pots for Groups A and B
Pot 1	Pot 2	Pot 3	Pot 4
(France) Paris Saint-Germain (North Macedonia) Vardar 1961 (Spain) Barça (Hungary) Telekom Veszprém	(Poland) Łomża Vive Kielce (Denmark) Aalborg Håndbold (Portugal) FC Porto (Germany) THW Kiel	(Hungary) MOL-Pick Szeged (Ukraine) Motor (Belarus) Meshkov Brest (France) HBC Nantes	(Slovenia) Celje Pivovarna Laško (Croatia) PPD Zagreb (Norway) Elverum Håndball (Germany) SG Flensburg-Handewitt

== Format ==
In each group, teams played against each other in a double round-robin format, with home and away matches.

== Tiebreakers ==
In the group stage, teams were ranked according to points (2 points for a win, 1 point for a draw, 0 points for a loss). After completion of the group stage, if two or more teams have the same number of points, the ranking is determined as follows:

1. Highest number of points in matches between the teams directly involved;
2. Superior goal difference in matches between the teams directly involved;
3. Highest number of goals scored in matches between the teams directly involved (or in the away match in case of a two-team tie);
4. Superior goal difference in all matches of the group;
5. Highest number of plus goals in all matches of the group;

If the ranking of one of these teams is determined, the above criteria are consecutively followed until the ranking of all teams is determined. If no ranking can be determined, a decision shall be obtained by EHF through drawing of lots.

== Groups ==
The matchdays were 16–17 September, 23–24 September, 30 September–1 October, 14–15 October, 21–22 October, 28–29 October, 18–19 November, 25–26 November, 2–3 December, 9–10 December 2020, 10–11 February, 17–18 February, 24–25 February, 3–4 March 2021.

Times until 25 October 2020 are UTC+2, from 26 October 2020 on times are UTC+1.

Due to the COVID-19 pandemic, each local health department allows a different number of spectators.

On 10 February 2021, after a decision by the EHF Executive Committee, it was announced that all 16 teams advance to the knockout stage.

The matches which could not be played were assessed.

=== Group A ===
Pos	Team	Pld	W	D	L	GF	GA	GD	Pts	Qualification
1	(Germany) SG Flensburg-Handewitt	14	10	1	3	341	336	+5	21	Play-offs
2	(France) Paris Saint-Germain	14	9	1	4	388	327	+61	19 (Note: Paris 70–61 Kielce)	Play-offs
3	(Poland) Łomża Vive Kielce	14	9	1	4	442	414	+28	19	Play-offs
4	(Belarus) Meshkov Brest	14	7	1	6	383	380	+3	15	Play-offs
5	(Portugal) FC Porto	14	5	2	7	361	352	+9	12 (Note: Porto 56–54 Pick Szeged)	Play-offs
6	(Hungary) MOL-Pick Szeged	14	6	0	8	318	329	−11	12	Play-offs
7	(North Macedonia) Vardar 1961	14	3	3	8	335	350	−15	9	Play-offs
8	(Norway) Elverum Håndball	14	2	1	11	387	457	−70	5	Play-offs

Source: EHF
Rules for classification: Tiebreakers
Notes:

16 September 2020; 18:45	Meshkov Brest (Belarus)	24–22	(North Macedonia) Vardar 1961	Universal Sports Complex Victoria, Brest; Attendance: 1,350; Referees: Volodkov, Zotin (RUS)
16 September 2020; 18:45	Panić 7	(12–10)	Vujin 6	Universal Sports Complex Victoria, Brest; Attendance: 1,350; Referees: Volodkov, Zotin (RUS)
16 September 2020; 18:45	3× (yellow card)	Report	2× (yellow card) 5× (suspension)	Universal Sports Complex Victoria, Brest; Attendance: 1,350; Referees: Volodkov, Zotin (RUS)

16 September 2020; 20:45	SG Flensburg-Handewitt (Germany)	31–30	(Poland) Łomża Vive Kielce	Flens-Arena, Flensburg; Attendance: 0 (Note: The match was played behind closed doors due to the COVID-19 pandemic.); Referees: Kurtagic, Wetterwik (SWE)
16 September 2020; 20:45	Rød 6	(14–14)	Karalek 7	Flens-Arena, Flensburg; Attendance: 0 Referees: Kurtagic, Wetterwik (SWE)
16 September 2020; 20:45	1× (yellow card) 2× (suspension)	Report	1× (suspension)	Flens-Arena, Flensburg; Attendance: 0 Referees: Kurtagic, Wetterwik (SWE)

17 September 2020; 20:45	FC Porto (Portugal)	28–30	(Norway) Elverum Håndball	Dragão Arena, Porto; Attendance: 0 Referees: Pichon, Reveret (FRA)
17 September 2020; 20:45	three players 5	(16–12)	Blonz 10	Dragão Arena, Porto; Attendance: 0 Referees: Pichon, Reveret (FRA)
17 September 2020; 20:45	3× (yellow card) 9× (suspension) 1× (red card)	Report	1× (yellow card) 5× (suspension)	Dragão Arena, Porto; Attendance: 0 Referees: Pichon, Reveret (FRA)

23 September 2020; 18:45	Łomża Vive Kielce (Poland)	26–23	(Hungary) MOL-Pick Szeged	Hala Legionów, Kielce; Attendance: 1,800; Referees: Mortensen, Madsen (DEN)
23 September 2020; 18:45	A. Dujshebaev 8	(12–7)	Cañellas 11	Hala Legionów, Kielce; Attendance: 1,800; Referees: Mortensen, Madsen (DEN)
23 September 2020; 18:45	4× (suspension)	Report	1× (yellow card) 5× (suspension)	Hala Legionów, Kielce; Attendance: 1,800; Referees: Mortensen, Madsen (DEN)

23 September 2020; 20:45	Paris Saint-Germain (France)	28–29	(Germany) SG Flensburg-Handewitt	Stade Pierre de Coubertin, Paris; Attendance: 954; Referees: López, Ramírez (ESP)
23 September 2020; 20:45	L. Karabatic 5	(18–14)	Wanne 8	Stade Pierre de Coubertin, Paris; Attendance: 954; Referees: López, Ramírez (ESP)
23 September 2020; 20:45	1× (yellow card) 4× (suspension)	Report	1× (yellow card) 3× (suspension) 1× (red card)	Stade Pierre de Coubertin, Paris; Attendance: 954; Referees: López, Ramírez (ESP)

23 September 2020; 20:45	FC Porto (Portugal)	27–25	(Belarus) Meshkov Brest	Dragão Arena, Porto; Attendance: 17; Referees: Marìn, García (ESP)
23 September 2020; 20:45	Areia 5	(12–9)	Panić 8	Dragão Arena, Porto; Attendance: 17; Referees: Marìn, García (ESP)
23 September 2020; 20:45	3× (yellow card) 6× (suspension)	Report	1× (yellow card) 5× (suspension)	Dragão Arena, Porto; Attendance: 17; Referees: Marìn, García (ESP)

30 September 2020; 18:45	Meshkov Brest (Belarus)	32–31	(France) Paris Saint-Germain	Universal Sports Complex Victoria, Brest; Attendance: 2,650; Referees: Pavićević, Ražnatović (MNE)
30 September 2020; 18:45	Vailupau 7	(19–14)	Krištopāns 7	Universal Sports Complex Victoria, Brest; Attendance: 2,650; Referees: Pavićević, Ražnatović (MNE)
30 September 2020; 18:45	3× (yellow card) 5× (suspension)	Report	3× (yellow card) 7× (suspension)	Universal Sports Complex Victoria, Brest; Attendance: 2,650; Referees: Pavićević, Ražnatović (MNE)

30 September 2020; 20:45	SG Flensburg-Handewitt (Germany)	36–29	(Portugal) FC Porto	Flens-Arena, Flensburg; Attendance: 722; Referees: Mortensen, Madsen (DEN)
30 September 2020; 20:45	Møller 7	(15–15)	Gomes, Salina 5	Flens-Arena, Flensburg; Attendance: 722; Referees: Mortensen, Madsen (DEN)
30 September 2020; 20:45	3× (suspension)	Report	2× (yellow card) 6× (suspension)	Flens-Arena, Flensburg; Attendance: 722; Referees: Mortensen, Madsen (DEN)

1 October 2020; 20:45	Elverum Håndball (Norway)	22–31	(Poland) Łomża Vive Kielce	Terningen Arena, Elverum; Attendance: 200; Referees: Līcis, Sondors (LAT)
1 October 2020; 20:45	Máthé, Pujol 5	(11–18)	Tournat 5	Terningen Arena, Elverum; Attendance: 200; Referees: Līcis, Sondors (LAT)
1 October 2020; 20:45	1× (yellow card) 2× (suspension)	Report	2× (yellow card) 3× (suspension)	Terningen Arena, Elverum; Attendance: 200; Referees: Līcis, Sondors (LAT)

14 October 2020; 18:45	Łomża Vive Kielce (Poland)	34–27	(Belarus) Meshkov Brest	Hala Legionów, Kielce; Attendance: 0 Referees: Lah, Sok (SLO)
14 October 2020; 18:45	five players 4	(18–11)	Shumak 6	Hala Legionów, Kielce; Attendance: 0 Referees: Lah, Sok (SLO)
14 October 2020; 18:45	4× (suspension)	Report	3× (yellow card) 5× (suspension)	Hala Legionów, Kielce; Attendance: 0 Referees: Lah, Sok (SLO)

15 October 2020; 20:45	Vardar 1961 (North Macedonia)	31–26	(Germany) SG Flensburg-Handewitt	Jane Sandanski Arena, Skopje; Attendance: 0 Referees: Pavićević, Ražnatović (MNE)
15 October 2020; 20:45	Stoilov 8	(17–15)	Johannessen 7	Jane Sandanski Arena, Skopje; Attendance: 0 Referees: Pavićević, Ražnatović (MNE)
15 October 2020; 20:45	3× (yellow card) 3× (suspension) 1× (red card)	Report	2× (yellow card) 7× (suspension) 1× (red card)	Jane Sandanski Arena, Skopje; Attendance: 0 Referees: Pavićević, Ražnatović (MNE)

15 October 2020; 20:45	Paris Saint-Germain (France)	35–29	(Norway) Elverum Håndball	Stade Pierre de Coubertin, Paris; Attendance: 957; Referees: Mošorinski, Pandžić (SRB)
15 October 2020; 20:45	Hansen 8	(17–13)	Pujol 7	Stade Pierre de Coubertin, Paris; Attendance: 957; Referees: Mošorinski, Pandžić (SRB)
15 October 2020; 20:45	2× (yellow card)	Report	3× (yellow card) 3× (suspension)	Stade Pierre de Coubertin, Paris; Attendance: 957; Referees: Mošorinski, Pandžić (SRB)

15 October 2020; 20:45	FC Porto (Portugal)	25–19	(Hungary) MOL-Pick Szeged	Dragão Arena, Porto; Attendance: 15; Referees: Brunner, Salah (SUI)
15 October 2020; 20:45	Martins 5	(15–10)	Cañellas 7	Dragão Arena, Porto; Attendance: 15; Referees: Brunner, Salah (SUI)
15 October 2020; 20:45	1× (yellow card) 2× (suspension)	Report	2× (yellow card) 1× (suspension)	Dragão Arena, Porto; Attendance: 15; Referees: Brunner, Salah (SUI)

22 October 2020; 18:45	Meshkov Brest (Belarus)	26–24	(Hungary) MOL-Pick Szeged	Universal Sports Complex Victoria, Brest; Attendance: 2,070; Referees: Nikolić, Stojković (SRB)
22 October 2020; 18:45	Malus 7	(11–12)	Šoštarič 9	Universal Sports Complex Victoria, Brest; Attendance: 2,070; Referees: Nikolić, Stojković (SRB)
22 October 2020; 18:45	1× (yellow card) 4× (suspension)	Report	3× (yellow card) 3× (suspension)	Universal Sports Complex Victoria, Brest; Attendance: 2,070; Referees: Nikolić, Stojković (SRB)

22 October 2020; 20:45	Łomża Vive Kielce (Poland)	35–33	(France) Paris Saint-Germain	Hala Legionów, Kielce; Attendance: 0 Referees: Gubica, Milošević (CRO)
22 October 2020; 20:45	Karačić 13	(18–18)	Hansen 10	Hala Legionów, Kielce; Attendance: 0 Referees: Gubica, Milošević (CRO)
22 October 2020; 20:45	1× (yellow card) 3× (suspension)	Report	1× (yellow card) 4× (suspension)	Hala Legionów, Kielce; Attendance: 0 Referees: Gubica, Milošević (CRO)

22 October 2020; 20:45	Vardar 1961 (North Macedonia)	25–25	(Portugal) FC Porto	Jane Sandanski Arena, Skopje; Attendance: 0 Referees: Jurinović, Mrvica (CRO)
22 October 2020; 20:45	Čupić 7	(13–12)	Iturriza 7	Jane Sandanski Arena, Skopje; Attendance: 0 Referees: Jurinović, Mrvica (CRO)
22 October 2020; 20:45	1× (yellow card) 2× (suspension)	Report	4× (yellow card) 3× (suspension)	Jane Sandanski Arena, Skopje; Attendance: 0 Referees: Jurinović, Mrvica (CRO)

22 October 2020; 20:45	SG Flensburg-Handewitt (Germany)	37–35	(Norway) Elverum Håndball	Flens-Arena, Flensburg; Attendance: 511; Referees: Mažeika, Gatelis (LTU)
22 October 2020; 20:45	Johannessen 8	(18–14)	Solstad 7	Flens-Arena, Flensburg; Attendance: 511; Referees: Mažeika, Gatelis (LTU)
22 October 2020; 20:45	1× (yellow card) 4× (suspension)	Report	1× (yellow card) 2× (suspension)	Flens-Arena, Flensburg; Attendance: 511; Referees: Mažeika, Gatelis (LTU)

29 October 2020; 20:45	FC Porto (Portugal)	32–32	(Poland) Łomża Vive Kielce	Dragão Arena, Porto; Attendance: 20; Referees: Schulze, Tönnies (GER)
29 October 2020; 20:45	Martins 9	(19–17)	Karačić 5	Dragão Arena, Porto; Attendance: 20; Referees: Schulze, Tönnies (GER)
29 October 2020; 20:45	2× (yellow card) 4× (suspension)	Report	2× (suspension)	Dragão Arena, Porto; Attendance: 20; Referees: Schulze, Tönnies (GER)

18 November 2020; 18:45	SG Flensburg-Handewitt (Germany)	29–29	(Belarus) Meshkov Brest	Flens-Arena, Flensburg; Attendance: 0 Referees: Horáček, Novotný (CZE)
18 November 2020; 18:45	Steinhauser, Johannessen 7	(13–11)	Baranau, Panić 7	Flens-Arena, Flensburg; Attendance: 0 Referees: Horáček, Novotný (CZE)
18 November 2020; 18:45	2× (suspension)	Report	1× (yellow card) 2× (suspension)	Flens-Arena, Flensburg; Attendance: 0 Referees: Horáček, Novotný (CZE)

18 November 2020; 18:45	FC Porto (Portugal)	31–34	(France) Paris Saint-Germain	Dragão Arena, Porto; Attendance: 0 Referees: Lah, Sok (SLO)
18 November 2020; 18:45	Branquinho, Silva 4	(16–12)	Hansen 9	Dragão Arena, Porto; Attendance: 0 Referees: Lah, Sok (SLO)
18 November 2020; 18:45	2× (yellow card) 5× (suspension)	Report	1× (yellow card) 4× (suspension)	Dragão Arena, Porto; Attendance: 0 Referees: Lah, Sok (SLO)

19 November 2020; 18:45	Vardar 1961 (North Macedonia)	29–33	(Poland) Łomża Vive Kielce	Jane Sandanski Arena, Skopje; Attendance: 0 Referees: Brkic, Jusufhodzic (AUT)
19 November 2020; 18:45	Jotić 6	(13–16)	A. Dujshebaev 10	Jane Sandanski Arena, Skopje; Attendance: 0 Referees: Brkic, Jusufhodzic (AUT)
19 November 2020; 18:45	3× (yellow card) 4× (suspension)	Report	1× (yellow card) 5× (suspension)	Jane Sandanski Arena, Skopje; Attendance: 0 Referees: Brkic, Jusufhodzic (AUT)

25 November 2020; 20:45	Łomża Vive Kielce (Poland)	36–29	(North Macedonia) Vardar 1961	Hala Legionów, Kielce; Attendance: 0 Referees: Brunner, Salah (SUI)
25 November 2020; 20:45	A. Dujshebaev, Moryto 7	(18–12)	Dibirov 7	Hala Legionów, Kielce; Attendance: 0 Referees: Brunner, Salah (SUI)
25 November 2020; 20:45	1× (yellow card) 4× (suspension)	Report	1× (yellow card) 2× (suspension)	Hala Legionów, Kielce; Attendance: 0 Referees: Brunner, Salah (SUI)

26 November 2020; 18:45	MOL-Pick Szeged (Hungary)	36–27	(Norway) Elverum Håndball	Városi Sportcsarnok, Szeged; Attendance: 0 Referees: Marín, García (ESP)
26 November 2020; 18:45	Bodó 9	(17–15)	Blonz 7	Városi Sportcsarnok, Szeged; Attendance: 0 Referees: Marín, García (ESP)
26 November 2020; 18:45	1× (yellow card) 1× (suspension)	Report	1× (yellow card) 2× (suspension)	Városi Sportcsarnok, Szeged; Attendance: 0 Referees: Marín, García (ESP)

26 November 2020; 18:45	Paris Saint-Germain (France)	29–28	(Portugal) FC Porto	Stade Pierre de Coubertin, Paris; Attendance: 0 Referees: Stark, Ștefan (ROU)
26 November 2020; 18:45	Hansen 9	(15–11)	Salina 5	Stade Pierre de Coubertin, Paris; Attendance: 0 Referees: Stark, Ștefan (ROU)
26 November 2020; 18:45	3× (yellow card)	Report	3× (yellow card) 2× (suspension)	Stade Pierre de Coubertin, Paris; Attendance: 0 Referees: Stark, Ștefan (ROU)

3 December 2020; 18:45	Meshkov Brest (Belarus)	29–27	(Norway) Elverum Håndball	Universal Sports Complex Victoria, Brest; Attendance: 1,040; Referees: Erdoğan, Özdeniz (TUR)
3 December 2020; 18:45	Shumak 6	(15–17)	Abalo 5	Universal Sports Complex Victoria, Brest; Attendance: 1,040; Referees: Erdoğan, Özdeniz (TUR)
3 December 2020; 18:45	2× (yellow card) 4× (suspension)	Report	2× (yellow card) 6× (suspension) 1× (red card)	Universal Sports Complex Victoria, Brest; Attendance: 1,040; Referees: Erdoğan, Özdeniz (TUR)

3 December 2020; 18:45	SG Flensburg-Handewitt (Germany)	26–24	(Hungary) MOL-Pick Szeged	Flens-Arena, Flensburg; Attendance: 0 Referees: Brkic, Jusufhodzic (AUT)
3 December 2020; 18:45	Johannessen 7	(11–10)	Bodó, Radivojević 6	Flens-Arena, Flensburg; Attendance: 0 Referees: Brkic, Jusufhodzic (AUT)
3 December 2020; 18:45	2× (yellow card) 4× (suspension)	Report	1× (yellow card) 2× (suspension) 1× (red card)	Flens-Arena, Flensburg; Attendance: 0 Referees: Brkic, Jusufhodzic (AUT)

9 December 2020; 18:45	MOL-Pick Szeged (Hungary)	30–27	(Belarus) Meshkov Brest	Városi Sportcsarnok, Szeged; Attendance: 0 Referees: Gasmi, Gasmi (FRA)
9 December 2020; 18:45	Bánhidi 12	(18–13)	Panić 7	Városi Sportcsarnok, Szeged; Attendance: 0 Referees: Gasmi, Gasmi (FRA)
9 December 2020; 18:45	2× (yellow card) 4× (suspension)	Report	2× (yellow card) 2× (suspension)	Városi Sportcsarnok, Szeged; Attendance: 0 Referees: Gasmi, Gasmi (FRA)

10 December 2020; 18:45	Elverum Håndball (Norway)	29–30	(Germany) SG Flensburg-Handewitt	Terningen Arena, Elverum; Attendance: 200; Referees: Pálsson, Elíasson (ISL)
10 December 2020; 18:45	Máthé 7	(12–15)	Golla 7	Terningen Arena, Elverum; Attendance: 200; Referees: Pálsson, Elíasson (ISL)
10 December 2020; 18:45	1× (yellow card) 4× (suspension)	Report	2× (yellow card) 2× (suspension)	Terningen Arena, Elverum; Attendance: 200; Referees: Pálsson, Elíasson (ISL)

17 December 2020 (Note: The match, originally scheduled for 28 October 2020, was postponed.); 18:45	Elverum Håndball (Norway)	33–31	(Belarus) Meshkov Brest	Terningen Arena, Elverum; Attendance: 200; Referees: Hansen, Madsen (DEN)
17 December 2020; 18:45	three players 5	(16–17)	Vranješ 7	Terningen Arena, Elverum; Attendance: 200; Referees: Hansen, Madsen (DEN)
17 December 2020; 18:45	5× (suspension) 1× (red card)	Report	5× (suspension) 1× (red card)	Terningen Arena, Elverum; Attendance: 200; Referees: Hansen, Madsen (DEN)

4 February 2021 (Note: The match, originally scheduled for 25 November 2020, was postponed.); 18:45	Meshkov Brest (Belarus)	26–28	(Germany) SG Flensburg-Handewitt	Universal Sports Complex Victoria, Brest; Attendance: 2,045; Referees: Covalciuc, Covalciuc (MDA)
4 February 2021; 18:45	three players 5	(15–14)	Johannessen 9	Universal Sports Complex Victoria, Brest; Attendance: 2,045; Referees: Covalciuc, Covalciuc (MDA)
4 February 2021; 18:45	1× (yellow card) 3× (suspension)	Report	2× (yellow card) 3× (suspension)	Universal Sports Complex Victoria, Brest; Attendance: 2,045; Referees: Covalciuc, Covalciuc (MDA)

4 February 2021 (Note: The match, originally scheduled for 4 December 2020, was postponed.); 20:45	FC Porto (Portugal)	27–24	(North Macedonia) Vardar 1961	Dragão Arena, Porto; Attendance: 0 Referees: Kurtagic, Wetterwik (SWE)
4 February 2021; 20:45	Branquinho 7	(13–13)	Dibirov 9	Dragão Arena, Porto; Attendance: 0 Referees: Kurtagic, Wetterwik (SWE)
4 February 2021; 20:45	1× (yellow card) 2× (suspension)	Report	2× (suspension)	Dragão Arena, Porto; Attendance: 0 Referees: Kurtagic, Wetterwik (SWE)

6 February 2021 (Note: The match, originally scheduled for 16 September 2020, was postponed after a positive COVID-19 test by a Pick Szeged player.); 20:00	MOL-Pick Szeged (Hungary)	29–32	(France) Paris Saint-Germain	Városi Sportcsarnok, Szeged; Attendance: 0 Referees: Pandžić, Mošorinski (SRB)
6 February 2021; 20:00	four players 4	(17–16)	Hansen 10	Városi Sportcsarnok, Szeged; Attendance: 0 Referees: Pandžić, Mošorinski (SRB)
6 February 2021; 20:00	3× (yellow card) 3× (suspension)	Report	2× (yellow card) 1× (suspension)	Városi Sportcsarnok, Szeged; Attendance: 0 Referees: Pandžić, Mošorinski (SRB)

9 February 2021 (Note: The match, originally scheduled for 9 December and later re-scheduled to 17 December 2020, was postponed.); 18:45	Łomża Vive Kielce (Poland)	32–30	(Portugal) FC Porto	Hala Legionów, Kielce; Attendance: 0 Referees: Mažeika, Gatelis (LTU)
9 February 2021; 18:45	A. Dujshebaev 10	(19–14)	Iturriza, R.Silva 6	Hala Legionów, Kielce; Attendance: 0 Referees: Mažeika, Gatelis (LTU)
9 February 2021; 18:45	2× (yellow card) 2× (suspension)	Report	2× (suspension)	Hala Legionów, Kielce; Attendance: 0 Referees: Mažeika, Gatelis (LTU)

11 February 2021; 18:45	MOL-Pick Szeged (Hungary)	35–31	(Portugal) FC Porto	Városi Sportcsarnok, Szeged; Attendance: 0 Referees: Horáček, Novotný (CZE)
11 February 2021; 18:45	Kašpárek 7	(18–12)	Silva 6	Városi Sportcsarnok, Szeged; Attendance: 0 Referees: Horáček, Novotný (CZE)
11 February 2021; 18:45	2× (yellow card) 3× (suspension)	Report	1× (yellow card) 2× (suspension)	Városi Sportcsarnok, Szeged; Attendance: 0 Referees: Horáček, Novotný (CZE)

11 February 2021; 18:45	Meshkov Brest (Belarus)	35–30	(Poland) Łomża Vive Kielce	Universal Sports Complex Victoria, Brest; Attendance: 2,040; Referees: Zotin, Volodkov (RUS)
11 February 2021; 18:45	Skube 7	(15–11)	A. Dujshebaev, Karalek 5	Universal Sports Complex Victoria, Brest; Attendance: 2,040; Referees: Zotin, Volodkov (RUS)
11 February 2021; 18:45	4× (yellow card) 4× (suspension)	Report	1× (yellow card) 5× (suspension)	Universal Sports Complex Victoria, Brest; Attendance: 2,040; Referees: Zotin, Volodkov (RUS)

14 February 2021; 18:00	Vardar 1961 (North Macedonia)	26–28	(Hungary) MOL-Pick Szeged	Jane Sandanski Arena, Skopje; Attendance: 0 Referees: Zotin, Volodkov (RUS)
14 February 2021; 18:00	Dibirov, Jotić 6	(15–13)	Bánhidi, Radivojević 6	Jane Sandanski Arena, Skopje; Attendance: 0 Referees: Zotin, Volodkov (RUS)
14 February 2021; 18:00	1× (yellow card) 2× (suspension)	Report	2× (yellow card) 3× (suspension)	Jane Sandanski Arena, Skopje; Attendance: 0 Referees: Zotin, Volodkov (RUS)

17 February 2021; 18:45	Paris Saint-Germain (France)	33–26	(Belarus) Meshkov Brest	Stade Pierre de Coubertin, Paris; Attendance: 0 Referees: Kurtagic, Wetterwik (SWE)
17 February 2021; 18:45	Kounkoud 8	(15–12)	Vailupau 8	Stade Pierre de Coubertin, Paris; Attendance: 0 Referees: Kurtagic, Wetterwik (SWE)
17 February 2021; 18:45	4× (suspension) 1× (red card)	Report	3× (suspension)	Stade Pierre de Coubertin, Paris; Attendance: 0 Referees: Kurtagic, Wetterwik (SWE)

18 February 2021; 18:45	Łomża Vive Kielce (Poland)	39–29	(Norway) Elverum Håndball	Hala Legionów, Kielce; Attendance: 0 Referees: Erdoğan, Özdeniz (TUR)
18 February 2021; 18:45	Karalek 7	(20–14)	Solstad 8	Hala Legionów, Kielce; Attendance: 0 Referees: Erdoğan, Özdeniz (TUR)
18 February 2021; 18:45	1× (yellow card) 3× (suspension)	Report	2× (yellow card) 6× (suspension) 1× (red card)	Hala Legionów, Kielce; Attendance: 0 Referees: Erdoğan, Özdeniz (TUR)

18 February 2021 (Note: The match, rescheduled for 22 December, was postponed.); 18:45	MOL-Pick Szeged (Hungary)	34–33	(North Macedonia) Vardar 1961	Városi Sportcsarnok, Szeged; Attendance: 0 Referees: Hansen, Madsen (DEN)
18 February 2021; 18:45	Bodó 7	(17–19)	Čupić 9	Városi Sportcsarnok, Szeged; Attendance: 0 Referees: Hansen, Madsen (DEN)
18 February 2021; 18:45	1× (yellow card) 6× (suspension)	Report	1× (yellow card) 3× (suspension)	Városi Sportcsarnok, Szeged; Attendance: 0 Referees: Hansen, Madsen (DEN)

21 February 2021 (Note: The match, originally scheduled for 24 September 2020, was postponed because of the restrictions of the Norwegian government, applicable to the team of Elverum regarding their travel to Skopje and especially their re-entry into Norway.); 16:00	Vardar 1961 (North Macedonia)	34–34	(Norway) Elverum Håndball	Jane Sandanski Arena, Skopje; Attendance: 0 Referees: Lah, Sok (SLO)
21 February 2021; 16:00	Gadža 8	(20–21)	three players 5	Jane Sandanski Arena, Skopje; Attendance: 0 Referees: Lah, Sok (SLO)
21 February 2021; 16:00	6× (suspension)	Report	1× (yellow card) 3× (suspension)	Jane Sandanski Arena, Skopje; Attendance: 0 Referees: Lah, Sok (SLO)

23 February 2021 (Note: The match, originally scheduled for 3 December 2020, was postponed.); 18:45	Paris Saint-Germain (France)	37–26	(Poland) Łomża Vive Kielce	Stade Pierre de Coubertin, Paris; Attendance: 0 Referees: Marìn, García (ESP)
23 February 2021; 18:45	Hansen, Steins 6	(19–10)	Sićko 5	Stade Pierre de Coubertin, Paris; Attendance: 0 Referees: Marìn, García (ESP)
23 February 2021; 18:45	4× (suspension)	Report	4× (suspension) 1× (red card)	Stade Pierre de Coubertin, Paris; Attendance: 0 Referees: Marìn, García (ESP)

24 February 2021; 18:45	Elverum Håndball (Norway)	32–35	(North Macedonia) Vardar 1961	Jane Sandanski Arena, Skopje; Attendance: 0 Referees: Gubica, Milošević (CRO)
24 February 2021; 18:45	Máthé, Pujol 5	(20–17)	Dibirov 9	Jane Sandanski Arena, Skopje; Attendance: 0 Referees: Gubica, Milošević (CRO)
24 February 2021; 18:45	1× (yellow card) 3× (suspension)	Report	4× (suspension) 1× (red card)	Jane Sandanski Arena, Skopje; Attendance: 0 Referees: Gubica, Milošević (CRO)

25 February 2021; 18:45	MOL-Pick Szeged (Hungary)	26–30	(Poland) Łomża Vive Kielce	Városi Sportcsarnok, Szeged; Attendance: 0 Referees: Nikolić, Stojković (SRB)
25 February 2021; 18:45	Gaber 5	(14–14)	A. Dujshebaev 8	Városi Sportcsarnok, Szeged; Attendance: 0 Referees: Nikolić, Stojković (SRB)
25 February 2021; 18:45	2× (yellow card) 2× (suspension)	Report	3× (yellow card) 4× (suspension)	Városi Sportcsarnok, Szeged; Attendance: 0 Referees: Nikolić, Stojković (SRB)

25 February 2021; 20:45	SG Flensburg-Handewitt (Germany)	28–27	(France) Paris Saint-Germain	Flens-Arena, Flensburg; Attendance: 0 Referees: Nikolov, Nachevski (MKD)
25 February 2021; 20:45	Wanne 8	(19–10)	Hansen 7	Flens-Arena, Flensburg; Attendance: 0 Referees: Nikolov, Nachevski (MKD)
25 February 2021; 20:45	1× (yellow card) 5× (suspension) 1× (red card)	Report	1× (yellow card) 5× (suspension) 1× (red card)	Flens-Arena, Flensburg; Attendance: 0 Referees: Nikolov, Nachevski (MKD)

2 March 2021 (Note: The match, originally scheduled for 11 February 2021, was postponed.); 18:45	Elverum Håndball (Norway)	29–44	(France) Paris Saint-Germain	Stade Pierre de Coubertin, Paris; Attendance: 0 Referees: Hansen, Madsen (DEN)
2 March 2021; 18:45	Langaas 5	(12–19)	Nahi 8	Stade Pierre de Coubertin, Paris; Attendance: 0 Referees: Hansen, Madsen (DEN)
2 March 2021; 18:45	1× (yellow card) 3× (suspension)	Report	2× (suspension)	Stade Pierre de Coubertin, Paris; Attendance: 0 Referees: Hansen, Madsen (DEN)

4 March 2021; 18:45	Vardar 1961 (North Macedonia)	32–36	(Belarus) Meshkov Brest	Jane Sandanski Arena, Skopje; Attendance: 0 Referees: Konjičanin, Konjičanin (BIH)
4 March 2021; 18:45	Dibirov 9	(12–20)	Vailupau 12	Jane Sandanski Arena, Skopje; Attendance: 0 Referees: Konjičanin, Konjičanin (BIH)
4 March 2021; 18:45	2× (suspension)	Report	1× (yellow card) 4× (suspension)	Jane Sandanski Arena, Skopje; Attendance: 0 Referees: Konjičanin, Konjičanin (BIH)

4 March 2021; 18:45	Łomża Vive Kielce (Poland)	28–31	(Germany) SG Flensburg-Handewitt	Hala Legionów, Kielce; Attendance: 0 Referees: Horváth, Marton (HUN)
4 March 2021; 18:45	A. Dujshebaev, Moryto 6	(17–19)	Wanne 11	Hala Legionów, Kielce; Attendance: 0 Referees: Horváth, Marton (HUN)
4 March 2021; 18:45	2× (yellow card) 4× (suspension)	Report	2× (yellow card) 4× (suspension)	Hala Legionów, Kielce; Attendance: 0 Referees: Horváth, Marton (HUN)

4 March 2021; 20:45	Elverum Håndball (Norway)	31–38	(Portugal) FC Porto	Dragão Arena, Porto; Attendance: 0 Referees: Álvarez, Bustamante (ESP)
4 March 2021; 20:45	Solstad 7	(11–16)	Areia, Iturriza 7	Dragão Arena, Porto; Attendance: 0 Referees: Álvarez, Bustamante (ESP)
4 March 2021; 20:45	2× (suspension)	Report	1× (yellow card) 6× (suspension)	Dragão Arena, Porto; Attendance: 0 Referees: Álvarez, Bustamante (ESP)

Cancelled (Note: The match, originally scheduled for 28 October 2020, was postponed.)	Paris Saint-Germain (France)	5–5 (Note: The matches could not be played and were assessed by the EHF.)	(North Macedonia) Vardar 1961

Cancelled (Note: The match, originally scheduled for 19 November 2020, was postponed.)	Elverum Håndball (Norway)	0–10	(Hungary) MOL-Pick Szeged

Cancelled (Note: The match, originally scheduled for 10 December 2020, was postponed.)	Vardar 1961 (North Macedonia)	0–10	(France) Paris Saint-Germain

Cancelled (Note: The match, originally scheduled for 11 February 2021, was postponed.)	SG Flensburg-Handewitt (Germany)	0–10	(North Macedonia) Vardar 1961

Cancelled (Note: The match, originally scheduled for 18 February 2021, was postponed.)	FC Porto (Portugal)	10–0	(Germany) SG Flensburg-Handewitt

Cancelled (Note: The match, originally scheduled for 29 October 2020, was postponed.)	MOL-Pick Szeged (Hungary)	0–10	(Germany) SG Flensburg-Handewitt

Cancelled (Note: The match, originally scheduled for 24 February 2021, was postponed.)	Meshkov Brest (Belarus)	10–0	(Portugal) FC Porto

Cancelled (Note: The match, originally scheduled for 4 March 2021, was postponed.)	Paris Saint-Germain (France)	10–0	(Hungary) MOL-Pick Szeged

=== Group B ===
Pos	Team	Pld	W	D	L	GF	GA	GD	Pts	Qualification
1	(Spain) Barça	14	14	0	0	505	412	+93	28	Play-offs
2	(Hungary) Telekom Veszprém	14	9	2	3	443	392	+51	20	Play-offs
3	(Germany) THW Kiel	14	7	2	5	394	378	+16	16	Play-offs
4	(Denmark) Aalborg Håndbold	14	7	0	7	397	411	−14	14 (Note: Aalborg 67–56 Motor)	Play-offs
5	(Ukraine) Motor	14	7	0	7	389	411	−22	14	Play-offs
6	(France) HBC Nantes	14	5	2	7	388	378	+10	12	Play-offs
7	(Slovenia) Celje Pivovarna Laško	14	4	0	10	372	413	−41	8	Play-offs
8	(Croatia) PPD Zagreb	14	0	0	14	369	462	−93	0	Play-offs

Source: EHF
Rules for classification: Tiebreakers
Notes:

16 September 2020; 18:45	Celje Pivovarna Laško (Slovenia)	29–31	(Denmark) Aalborg Håndbold	Zlatorog Arena, Celje; Attendance: 0 Referees: Līcis, Sondors (LAT)
16 September 2020; 18:45	Kljun 6	(16–15)	Saugstrup 7	Zlatorog Arena, Celje; Attendance: 0 Referees: Līcis, Sondors (LAT)
16 September 2020; 18:45	2× (yellow card) 1× (suspension)	Report	2× (yellow card) 1× (suspension)	Zlatorog Arena, Celje; Attendance: 0 Referees: Līcis, Sondors (LAT)

16 September 2020; 20:45	HBC Nantes (France)	24–28	(Hungary) Telekom Veszprém	H Arena, Nantes; Attendance: 4,800; Referees: Schulze, Tönnies (GER)
16 September 2020; 20:45	Figueras, Lazarov 5	(10–11)	Manaskov, Nilsson 5	H Arena, Nantes; Attendance: 4,800; Referees: Schulze, Tönnies (GER)
16 September 2020; 20:45	4× (yellow card) 4× (suspension)	Report	1× (yellow card) 5× (suspension)	H Arena, Nantes; Attendance: 4,800; Referees: Schulze, Tönnies (GER)

17 September 2020; 18:45	Motor (Ukraine)	25–30	(Spain) Barça	Yunost Sport Hall, Zaporizhia; Attendance: 1,800; Referees: Mošorinski, Pandžić (SRB)
17 September 2020; 18:45	Malašinskas 7	(11–13)	Gómez 10	Yunost Sport Hall, Zaporizhia; Attendance: 1,800; Referees: Mošorinski, Pandžić (SRB)
17 September 2020; 18:45	1× (yellow card) 3× (suspension)	Report	1× (yellow card)	Yunost Sport Hall, Zaporizhia; Attendance: 1,800; Referees: Mošorinski, Pandžić (SRB)

17 September 2020; 18:45	PPD Zagreb (Croatia)	21–31	(Germany) THW Kiel	Arena Zagreb, Zagreb; Attendance: 50; Referees: Konjičanin, Konjičanin (BIH)
17 September 2020; 18:45	Vistorop 6	(6–14)	Sagosen 7	Arena Zagreb, Zagreb; Attendance: 50; Referees: Konjičanin, Konjičanin (BIH)
17 September 2020; 18:45	1× (yellow card) 5× (suspension)	Report	1× (yellow card) 6× (suspension)	Arena Zagreb, Zagreb; Attendance: 50; Referees: Konjičanin, Konjičanin (BIH)

23 September 2020; 18:45	Aalborg Håndbold (Denmark)	38–29	(Ukraine) Motor	Gigantium, Aalborg; Attendance: 400; Referees: Brkic, Jusufhodzic (AUT)
23 September 2020; 18:45	three players 7	(17–13)	Malašinskas, Orbović 5	Gigantium, Aalborg; Attendance: 400; Referees: Brkic, Jusufhodzic (AUT)
23 September 2020; 18:45	1× (yellow card) 3× (suspension)	Report	3× (yellow card) 8× (suspension) 1× (red card)	Gigantium, Aalborg; Attendance: 400; Referees: Brkic, Jusufhodzic (AUT)

24 September 2020; 18:45	THW Kiel (Germany)	27–35	(France) HBC Nantes	Sparkassen-Arena, Kiel; Attendance: 1,523; Referees: Santos, Fonseca (POR)
24 September 2020; 18:45	three players 4	(12–15)	Rivera Folch 10	Sparkassen-Arena, Kiel; Attendance: 1,523; Referees: Santos, Fonseca (POR)
24 September 2020; 18:45	2× (yellow card) 3× (suspension)	Report	3× (yellow card) 7× (suspension)	Sparkassen-Arena, Kiel; Attendance: 1,523; Referees: Santos, Fonseca (POR)

24 September 2020; 18:45	Telekom Veszprém (Hungary)	37–25	(Croatia) PPD Zagreb	Veszprém Aréna, Veszprém; Attendance: 3,100; Referees: Leszczyński, Piechota (POL)
24 September 2020; 18:45	Omar 6	(18–12)	Hrstić 6	Veszprém Aréna, Veszprém; Attendance: 3,100; Referees: Leszczyński, Piechota (POL)
24 September 2020; 18:45	1× (yellow card) 1× (suspension)	Report	1× (yellow card) 3× (suspension) 1× (red card)	Veszprém Aréna, Veszprém; Attendance: 3,100; Referees: Leszczyński, Piechota (POL)

24 September 2020; 20:45	Barça (Spain)	42–28	(Slovenia) Celje Pivovarna Laško	Palau Blaugrana, Barcelona; Attendance: 0 Referees: Erdoğan, Özdeniz (TUR)
24 September 2020; 20:45	Janc 7	(21–14)	Novak 7	Palau Blaugrana, Barcelona; Attendance: 0 Referees: Erdoğan, Özdeniz (TUR)
24 September 2020; 20:45	2× (yellow card) 2× (suspension)	Report	1× (yellow card) 2× (suspension)	Palau Blaugrana, Barcelona; Attendance: 0 Referees: Erdoğan, Özdeniz (TUR)

30 September 2020; 18:45	Motor (Ukraine)	34–37	(Hungary) Telekom Veszprém	Yunost Sport Hall, Zaporizhia; Attendance: 1,350; Referees: Nikolov, Nachevski (MKD)
30 September 2020; 18:45	Kozakevych 8	(18–17)	Nenadić 10	Yunost Sport Hall, Zaporizhia; Attendance: 1,350; Referees: Nikolov, Nachevski (MKD)
30 September 2020; 18:45	1× (yellow card) 5× (suspension)	Report	1× (yellow card) 2× (suspension)	Yunost Sport Hall, Zaporizhia; Attendance: 1,350; Referees: Nikolov, Nachevski (MKD)

30 September 2020; 20:45	PPD Zagreb (Croatia)	26–27	(Denmark) Aalborg Håndbold	Arena Zagreb, Zagreb; Attendance: 100; Referees: Horváth, Marton (HUN)
30 September 2020; 20:45	Božović 7	(15–12)	Juul 8	Arena Zagreb, Zagreb; Attendance: 100; Referees: Horváth, Marton (HUN)
30 September 2020; 20:45	3× (yellow card) 4× (suspension)	Report	2× (yellow card) 3× (suspension)	Arena Zagreb, Zagreb; Attendance: 100; Referees: Horváth, Marton (HUN)

1 October 2020; 20:45	HBC Nantes (France)	27–35	(Spain) Barça	H Arena, Nantes; Attendance: 4,000; Referees: Brunner, Salah (SUI)
1 October 2020; 20:45	Ovniček, Pechmalbec 5	(15–18)	Mem 7	H Arena, Nantes; Attendance: 4,000; Referees: Brunner, Salah (SUI)
1 October 2020; 20:45	2× (suspension)	Report	1× (yellow card) 4× (suspension)	H Arena, Nantes; Attendance: 4,000; Referees: Brunner, Salah (SUI)

1 October 2020; 20:45	Celje Pivovarna Laško (Slovenia)	24–35	(Germany) THW Kiel	Zlatorog Arena, Celje; Attendance: 350; Referees: Boričić, Marković (SRB)
1 October 2020; 20:45	Horžen 4	(13–16)	Pekeler 6	Zlatorog Arena, Celje; Attendance: 350; Referees: Boričić, Marković (SRB)
1 October 2020; 20:45	1× (yellow card) 2× (suspension)	Report	3× (yellow card) 4× (suspension) 1× (red card)	Zlatorog Arena, Celje; Attendance: 350; Referees: Boričić, Marković (SRB)

14 October 2020; 18:45	Telekom Veszprém (Hungary)	39–24	(Slovenia) Celje Pivovarna Laško	Veszprém Aréna, Veszprém; Attendance: 3,500; Referees: Baďura, Ondogrecula (SVK)
14 October 2020; 18:45	Nilsson 6	(18–11)	Marguč 7	Veszprém Aréna, Veszprém; Attendance: 3,500; Referees: Baďura, Ondogrecula (SVK)
14 October 2020; 18:45	2× (yellow card) 3× (suspension)	Report	2× (yellow card) 1× (suspension) 1× (red card)	Veszprém Aréna, Veszprém; Attendance: 3,500; Referees: Baďura, Ondogrecula (SVK)

14 October 2020; 18:45	Aalborg Håndbold (Denmark)	32–24	(France) HBC Nantes	Gigantium, Aalborg; Attendance: 400; Referees: Kurtagic, Wetterwik (SWE)
14 October 2020; 18:45	Saugstrup 6	(16–9)	Fadhuile-Crepy 5	Gigantium, Aalborg; Attendance: 400; Referees: Kurtagic, Wetterwik (SWE)
14 October 2020; 18:45	2× (yellow card) 4× (suspension)	Report	1× (yellow card) 1× (suspension)	Gigantium, Aalborg; Attendance: 400; Referees: Kurtagic, Wetterwik (SWE)

14 October 2020; 20:45	Barça (Spain)	45–27	(Croatia) PPD Zagreb	Palau Blaugrana, Barcelona; Attendance: 39; Referees: Bonaventura, Bonaventura (FRA)
14 October 2020; 20:45	Mem 8	(24–13)	Vlah 5	Palau Blaugrana, Barcelona; Attendance: 39; Referees: Bonaventura, Bonaventura (FRA)
14 October 2020; 20:45	2× (suspension)	Report	2× (yellow card) 5× (suspension)	Palau Blaugrana, Barcelona; Attendance: 39; Referees: Bonaventura, Bonaventura (FRA)

21 October 2020; 18:45	Aalborg Håndbold (Denmark)	23–31	(Germany) THW Kiel	Gigantium, Aalborg; Attendance: 400; Referees: Pichon, Reveret (FRA)
21 October 2020; 18:45	Laesø 6	(9–17)	Sagosen 11	Gigantium, Aalborg; Attendance: 400; Referees: Pichon, Reveret (FRA)
21 October 2020; 18:45	1× (yellow card) 1× (suspension)	Report	1× (yellow card) 2× (suspension)	Gigantium, Aalborg; Attendance: 400; Referees: Pichon, Reveret (FRA)

21 October 2020; 20:45	PPD Zagreb (Croatia)	22–30	(Slovenia) Celje Pivovarna Laško	Arena Zagreb, Zagreb; Attendance: 122; Referees: Nikolov, Nachevski (MKD)
21 October 2020; 20:45	Vlah 5	(14–16)	Marguč, Kodrin 7	Arena Zagreb, Zagreb; Attendance: 122; Referees: Nikolov, Nachevski (MKD)
21 October 2020; 20:45	2× (yellow card) 3× (suspension)	Report	2× (yellow card) 3× (suspension)	Arena Zagreb, Zagreb; Attendance: 122; Referees: Nikolov, Nachevski (MKD)

28 October 2020; 18:45	THW Kiel (Germany)	31–31	(Hungary) Telekom Veszprém	Sparkassen-Arena, Kiel; Attendance: 1,605; Referees: Raluy, Sabroso (ESP)
28 October 2020; 18:45	Sagosen 9	(18–20)	Nenadić 5	Sparkassen-Arena, Kiel; Attendance: 1,605; Referees: Raluy, Sabroso (ESP)
28 October 2020; 18:45	1× (yellow card) 3× (suspension)	Report	1× (yellow card) 4× (suspension)	Sparkassen-Arena, Kiel; Attendance: 1,605; Referees: Raluy, Sabroso (ESP)

28 October 2020; 18:45	Celje Pivovarna Laško (Slovenia)	31–32	(Ukraine) Motor	Zlatorog Arena, Celje; Attendance: 20; Referees: Hucker, Andorka (HUN)
28 October 2020; 18:45	Novak 7	(14–17)	Pukhouski 6	Zlatorog Arena, Celje; Attendance: 20; Referees: Hucker, Andorka (HUN)
28 October 2020; 18:45	2× (suspension)	Report	1× (yellow card) 5× (suspension)	Zlatorog Arena, Celje; Attendance: 20; Referees: Hucker, Andorka (HUN)

29 October 2020; 20:45	Barça (Spain)	42–33	(Denmark) Aalborg Håndbold	Palau Blaugrana, Barcelona; Attendance: 40; Referees: Santos, Fonseca (POR)
29 October 2020; 20:45	Janc, Mem 6	(20–18)	Laesø 6	Palau Blaugrana, Barcelona; Attendance: 40; Referees: Santos, Fonseca (POR)
29 October 2020; 20:45	2× (yellow card) 2× (suspension)	Report	3× (yellow card) 1× (suspension)	Palau Blaugrana, Barcelona; Attendance: 40; Referees: Santos, Fonseca (POR)

18 November 2020; 18:45	Aalborg Håndbold (Denmark)	27–33	(Hungary) Telekom Veszprém	Gigantium, Aalborg; Attendance: 400; Referees: Bonaventura, Bonaventura (FRA)
18 November 2020; 18:45	Møllgaard 6	(18–16)	Nenadić, Omar 6	Gigantium, Aalborg; Attendance: 400; Referees: Bonaventura, Bonaventura (FRA)
18 November 2020; 18:45	2× (yellow card) 1× (suspension)	Report	1× (yellow card) 4× (suspension)	Gigantium, Aalborg; Attendance: 400; Referees: Bonaventura, Bonaventura (FRA)

18 November 2020; 20:45	PPD Zagreb (Croatia)	23–24	(Ukraine) Motor	Sportska dvorana Sutinska vrela, Zagreb; Attendance: 50; Referees: Mortensen, Madsen (DEN)
18 November 2020; 20:45	Mandić 6	(13–13)	Malašinskas, Pukhouski 5	Sportska dvorana Sutinska vrela, Zagreb; Attendance: 50; Referees: Mortensen, Madsen (DEN)
18 November 2020; 20:45	1× (yellow card) 5× (suspension)	Report	1× (yellow card) 4× (suspension) 1× (red card)	Sportska dvorana Sutinska vrela, Zagreb; Attendance: 50; Referees: Mortensen, Madsen (DEN)

19 November 2020; 18:45	THW Kiel (Germany)	26–32	(Spain) Barça	Sparkassen-Arena, Kiel; Attendance: 0 Referees: Kurtagic, Wetterwik (SWE)
19 November 2020; 18:45	Duvnjak, Ekberg 5	(15–16)	Mem 6	Sparkassen-Arena, Kiel; Attendance: 0 Referees: Kurtagic, Wetterwik (SWE)
19 November 2020; 18:45	2× (yellow card) 3× (suspension)	Report	1× (yellow card) 3× (suspension)	Sparkassen-Arena, Kiel; Attendance: 0 Referees: Kurtagic, Wetterwik (SWE)

25 November 2020; 18:45	Telekom Veszprém (Hungary)	30–32	(Denmark) Aalborg Håndbold	Veszprém Aréna, Veszprém; Attendance: 0 Referees: Boričić, Marković (SRB)
25 November 2020; 18:45	Borozan, Nenadić 6	(16–19)	Juul 8	Veszprém Aréna, Veszprém; Attendance: 0 Referees: Boričić, Marković (SRB)
25 November 2020; 18:45	2× (yellow card) 6× (suspension)	Report	2× (yellow card) 5× (suspension) 1× (red card)	Veszprém Aréna, Veszprém; Attendance: 0 Referees: Boričić, Marković (SRB)

25 November 2020; 20:45	Celje Pivovarna Laško (Slovenia)	25–31	(France) HBC Nantes	Zlatorog Arena, Celje; Attendance: 0 Referees: Leszczyński, Piechota (POL)
25 November 2020; 20:45	Horžen, Kodrin 6	(11–13)	Milić 6	Zlatorog Arena, Celje; Attendance: 0 Referees: Leszczyński, Piechota (POL)
25 November 2020; 20:45	1× (yellow card) 3× (suspension)	Report	1× (yellow card) 4× (suspension)	Zlatorog Arena, Celje; Attendance: 0 Referees: Leszczyński, Piechota (POL)

26 November 2020; 20:45	Barça (Spain)	29–25	(Germany) THW Kiel	Palau Blaugrana, Barcelona; Attendance: 10; Referees: Mažeika, Gatelis (LTU)
26 November 2020; 20:45	Fabregas 6	(13–12)	Zarabec 5	Palau Blaugrana, Barcelona; Attendance: 10; Referees: Mažeika, Gatelis (LTU)
26 November 2020; 20:45	2× (yellow card) 2× (suspension)	Report	1× (yellow card) 2× (suspension)	Palau Blaugrana, Barcelona; Attendance: 10; Referees: Mažeika, Gatelis (LTU)

2 December 2020; 18:45	Telekom Veszprém (Hungary)	41–33	(Germany) THW Kiel	Veszprém Aréna, Veszprém; Attendance: 0 Referees: Gubica, Milošević (CRO)
2 December 2020; 18:45	Nenadić 10	(19–19)	Ekberg 7	Veszprém Aréna, Veszprém; Attendance: 0 Referees: Gubica, Milošević (CRO)
2 December 2020; 18:45	2× (yellow card) 3× (suspension)	Report	4× (suspension)	Veszprém Aréna, Veszprém; Attendance: 0 Referees: Gubica, Milošević (CRO)

2 December 2020; 18:45	Aalborg Håndbold (Denmark)	32–35	(Spain) Barça	Gigantium, Aalborg; Attendance: 400; Referees: Jørum, Kleven (NOR)
2 December 2020; 18:45	Læsø 10	(15–19)	Pálmarsson 6	Gigantium, Aalborg; Attendance: 400; Referees: Jørum, Kleven (NOR)
2 December 2020; 18:45	1× (yellow card) 3× (suspension)	Report	2× (suspension)	Gigantium, Aalborg; Attendance: 400; Referees: Jørum, Kleven (NOR)

3 December 2020; 18:45	Motor (Ukraine)	31–29	(Slovenia) Celje Pivovarna Laško	Yunost Sport Hall, Zaporizhia; Attendance: 0 Referees: Pavićević, Ražnatović (MNE)
3 December 2020; 18:45	Bokhan 6	(14–13)	Mlakar 9	Yunost Sport Hall, Zaporizhia; Attendance: 0 Referees: Pavićević, Ražnatović (MNE)
3 December 2020; 18:45	1× (yellow card) 4× (suspension)	Report	2× (yellow card) 2× (suspension)	Yunost Sport Hall, Zaporizhia; Attendance: 0 Referees: Pavićević, Ražnatović (MNE)

9 December 2020; 20:45	HBC Nantes (France)	31–32	(Ukraine) Motor	H Arena, Nantes; Attendance: 0 Referees: López, Ramírez (ESP)
9 December 2020; 20:45	Lazarov, Minne 6	(18–18)	Bokhan 7	H Arena, Nantes; Attendance: 0 Referees: López, Ramírez (ESP)
9 December 2020; 20:45	1× (yellow card) 4× (suspension)	Report	1× (yellow card) 4× (suspension)	H Arena, Nantes; Attendance: 0 Referees: López, Ramírez (ESP)

17 December 2020 (Note: The match, originally scheduled for 26 November 2020, was postponed.); 18:45	Motor (Ukraine)	29–25	(Croatia) PPD Zagreb	Yunost Sport Hall, Zaporizhia; Attendance: 10; Referees: Covalciuc, Covalciuc (MDA)
17 December 2020; 18:45	Kozakevych 10	(13–13)	Matanović 8	Yunost Sport Hall, Zaporizhia; Attendance: 10; Referees: Covalciuc, Covalciuc (MDA)
17 December 2020; 18:45	2× (yellow card) 5× (suspension)	Report	3× (yellow card) 7× (suspension) 1× (red card)	Yunost Sport Hall, Zaporizhia; Attendance: 10; Referees: Covalciuc, Covalciuc (MDA)

20 December 2020 (Note: The match, originally scheduled for 21 October 2020, was postponed due to several positive COVID-19 tests by Motor players announced earlier on 9 October 2020.); 13:30	Motor (Ukraine)	29–28	(France) HBC Nantes	Yunost Sport Hall, Zaporizhia; Attendance: 10; Referees: Erdoğan, Özdeniz (TUR)
20 December 2020; 13:30	Bokhan 9	(13–13)	Minne 8	Yunost Sport Hall, Zaporizhia; Attendance: 10; Referees: Erdoğan, Özdeniz (TUR)
20 December 2020; 13:30	2× (yellow card) 5× (suspension)	Report	2× (yellow card) 2× (suspension)	Yunost Sport Hall, Zaporizhia; Attendance: 10; Referees: Erdoğan, Özdeniz (TUR)

4 February 2021 (Note: The match, originally scheduled for 14 October 2020, was postponed after several positive COVID-19 tests by Motor players.); 20:45	THW Kiel (Germany)	34–23	(Ukraine) Motor	Sparkassen-Arena, Kiel; Attendance: 0 Referees: Mandák, Rudinský (SVK)
4 February 2021; 20:45	Duvnjak 8	(16–12)	Kozakevych 5	Sparkassen-Arena, Kiel; Attendance: 0 Referees: Mandák, Rudinský (SVK)
4 February 2021; 20:45	1× (yellow card) 3× (suspension)	Report	1× (yellow card) 4× (suspension)	Sparkassen-Arena, Kiel; Attendance: 0 Referees: Mandák, Rudinský (SVK)

4 February 2021 (Note: The match, originally scheduled for 21 October 2020, was postponed due to Covid-19 cases in the Barça squad.); 20:45	Telekom Veszprém (Hungary)	34–37	(Spain) Barça	Veszprém Aréna, Veszprém; Attendance: 0 Referees: Nikolić, Stojković (SRB)
4 February 2021; 20:45	Manaskov, Maqueda 6	(15–19)	Gómez 10	Veszprém Aréna, Veszprém; Attendance: 0 Referees: Nikolić, Stojković (SRB)
4 February 2021; 20:45	1× (yellow card) 2× (suspension)	Report	3× (yellow card) 2× (suspension)	Veszprém Aréna, Veszprém; Attendance: 0 Referees: Nikolić, Stojković (SRB)

4 February 2021 (Note: The match, originally scheduled for 18 November 2020, was postponed.); 20:45	HBC Nantes (France)	28–30	(Slovenia) Celje Pivovarna Laško	H Arena, Nantes; Attendance: 0 Referees: Caçador, Nicolau (POR)
4 February 2021; 20:45	Balaguer 10	(13–14)	Mlakar 8	H Arena, Nantes; Attendance: 0 Referees: Caçador, Nicolau (POR)
4 February 2021; 20:45	2× (yellow card) 2× (suspension)	Report	2× (yellow card) 2× (suspension)	H Arena, Nantes; Attendance: 0 Referees: Caçador, Nicolau (POR)

9 February 2021 (Note: The match, originally scheduled for 10 December 2020, was postponed.); 18:45	Celje Pivovarna Laško (Slovenia)	29–28	(Croatia) PPD Zagreb	Zlatorog Arena, Celje; Attendance: 0 Referees: Brkic, Jusufhodzic (AUT)
9 February 2021; 18:45	Šarac 10	(14–12)	Hrstić 6	Zlatorog Arena, Celje; Attendance: 0 Referees: Brkic, Jusufhodzic (AUT)
9 February 2021; 18:45	1× (yellow card) 5× (suspension) 1× (red card)	Report	1× (yellow card) 5× (suspension)	Zlatorog Arena, Celje; Attendance: 0 Referees: Brkic, Jusufhodzic (AUT)

9 February 2021 (Note: The match, originally scheduled for 10 December 2020, was postponed.); 20:45	Barça (Spain)	37–30	(Hungary) Telekom Veszprém	Palau Blaugrana, Barcelona; Attendance: 0 Referees: Pichon, Reveret (FRA)
9 February 2021; 20:45	Gómez 10	(15–15)	Markussen 8	Palau Blaugrana, Barcelona; Attendance: 0 Referees: Pichon, Reveret (FRA)
9 February 2021; 20:45	1× (yellow card) 1× (suspension)	Report	3× (yellow card) 4× (suspension)	Palau Blaugrana, Barcelona; Attendance: 0 Referees: Pichon, Reveret (FRA)

10 February 2021; 20:45	HBC Nantes (France)	38–29	(Denmark) Aalborg Håndbold	H Arena, Nantes; Attendance: 0 Referees: Horváth, Marton (HUN)
10 February 2021; 20:45	Rivera Folch 7	(18–14)	Barthold 7	H Arena, Nantes; Attendance: 0 Referees: Horváth, Marton (HUN)
10 February 2021; 20:45	1× (yellow card) 3× (suspension)	Report	2× (yellow card) 1× (suspension)	H Arena, Nantes; Attendance: 0 Referees: Horváth, Marton (HUN)

11 February 2021; 20:45	Celje Pivovarna Laško (Slovenia)	25–29	(Hungary) Telekom Veszprém	Zlatorog Arena, Celje; Attendance: 0 Referees: Konjičanin, Konjičanin (BIH)
11 February 2021; 20:45	Grošelj 6	(14–16)	Marguč 5	Zlatorog Arena, Celje; Attendance: 0 Referees: Konjičanin, Konjičanin (BIH)
11 February 2021; 20:45	1× (yellow card) 6× (suspension)	Report	1× (yellow card) 3× (suspension)	Zlatorog Arena, Celje; Attendance: 0 Referees: Konjičanin, Konjičanin (BIH)

11 February 2021; 20:45	PPD Zagreb (Croatia)	33–37	(Spain) Barça	Arena Zagreb, Zagreb; Attendance: 0 Referees: Mitrevski, Todorovski (MKD)
11 February 2021; 20:45	Grahovac 6	(18–21)	Janc 6	Arena Zagreb, Zagreb; Attendance: 0 Referees: Mitrevski, Todorovski (MKD)
11 February 2021; 20:45	2× (yellow card) 5× (suspension)	Report	1× (yellow card) 4× (suspension)	Arena Zagreb, Zagreb; Attendance: 0 Referees: Mitrevski, Todorovski (MKD)

14 February 2021 (Note: The match, originally scheduled for 2 December 2020, was postponed.); 18:00	PPD Zagreb (Croatia)	24–34	(France) HBC Nantes	Arena Zagreb, Zagreb; Attendance: 0 Referees: Pavićević, Ražnatović (MNE)
14 February 2021; 18:00	Burić 6	(8–20)	Damatrin-Bertrand 6	Arena Zagreb, Zagreb; Attendance: 0 Referees: Pavićević, Ražnatović (MNE)
14 February 2021; 18:00	7× (suspension)	Report	2× (yellow card) 2× (suspension)	Arena Zagreb, Zagreb; Attendance: 0 Referees: Pavićević, Ražnatović (MNE)

17 February 2021; 18:45	Telekom Veszprém (Hungary)	34–30	(Ukraine) Motor	Veszprém Aréna, Veszprém; Attendance: 0 Referees: Brunner, Salah (SUI)
17 February 2021; 18:45	Maqueda 10	(17–17)	Horiha 7	Veszprém Aréna, Veszprém; Attendance: 0 Referees: Brunner, Salah (SUI)
17 February 2021; 18:45	1× (yellow card) 4× (suspension)	Report	2× (yellow card) 4× (suspension)	Veszprém Aréna, Veszprém; Attendance: 0 Referees: Brunner, Salah (SUI)

17 February 2021; 20:45	Barça (Spain)	30–29	(France) HBC Nantes	Palau Blaugrana, Barcelona; Attendance: 0 Referees: Nikolov, Nachevski (MKD)
17 February 2021; 20:45	three players 5	(14–17)	Rivera Folch 9	Palau Blaugrana, Barcelona; Attendance: 0 Referees: Nikolov, Nachevski (MKD)
17 February 2021; 20:45	1× (yellow card) 3× (suspension)	Report	1× (yellow card) 3× (suspension)	Palau Blaugrana, Barcelona; Attendance: 0 Referees: Nikolov, Nachevski (MKD)

18 February 2021; 18:45	Aalborg Håndbold (Denmark)	38–29	(Croatia) PPD Zagreb	Gigantium, Aalborg; Attendance: 1 Referees: Leszczyński, Piechota (POL)
18 February 2021; 18:45	Barthold 9	(22–14)	Burić 6	Gigantium, Aalborg; Attendance: 1 Referees: Leszczyński, Piechota (POL)
18 February 2021; 18:45	1× (yellow card) 3× (suspension)	Report	1× (yellow card) 3× (suspension)	Gigantium, Aalborg; Attendance: 1 Referees: Leszczyński, Piechota (POL)

23 February 2021 (Note: The match, originally scheduled for 29 October 2020, was postponed.); 20:45	HBC Nantes (France)	30–28	(Croatia) PPD Zagreb	H Arena, Nantes; Attendance: 0 Referees: Stark, Ștefan (ROU)
23 February 2021; 20:45	Rivera Folch 10	(13–14)	Hrstić, Mandić 5	H Arena, Nantes; Attendance: 0 Referees: Stark, Ștefan (ROU)
23 February 2021; 20:45	2× (suspension)	Report	2× (yellow card) 1× (suspension)	H Arena, Nantes; Attendance: 0 Referees: Stark, Ștefan (ROU)

23 February 2021 (Note: The match, originally scheduled for 9 December 2020, was postponed.); 20:45	THW Kiel (Germany)	28–26	(Denmark) Aalborg Håndbold	Sparkassen-Arena, Kiel; Attendance: 0 Referees: Brunner, Salah (SUI)
23 February 2021; 20:45	Ekberg 6	(15–15)	Barthold 7	Sparkassen-Arena, Kiel; Attendance: 0 Referees: Brunner, Salah (SUI)
23 February 2021; 20:45	1× (yellow card) 2× (suspension)	Report	1× (yellow card) 5× (suspension)	Sparkassen-Arena, Kiel; Attendance: 0 Referees: Brunner, Salah (SUI)

24 February 2021; 20:45	Celje Pivovarna Laško (Slovenia)	29–32	(Spain) Barça	Zlatorog Arena, Celje; Attendance: 0 Referees: Horáček, Novotný (CZE)
24 February 2021; 20:45	Novak 7	(17–16)	Frade 8	Zlatorog Arena, Celje; Attendance: 0 Referees: Horáček, Novotný (CZE)
24 February 2021; 20:45	5× (suspension)	Report	1× (yellow card) 2× (suspension)	Zlatorog Arena, Celje; Attendance: 0 Referees: Horáček, Novotný (CZE)

25 February 2021; 17:00	Motor (Ukraine)	27–29	(Denmark) Aalborg Håndbold	Yunost Sport Hall, Zaporizhia; Attendance: 1,500; Referees: Konjičanin, Konjičanin (BIH)
25 February 2021; 17:00	Dontsov 8	(15–14)	Barthold 11	Yunost Sport Hall, Zaporizhia; Attendance: 1,500; Referees: Konjičanin, Konjičanin (BIH)
25 February 2021; 17:00	1× (yellow card) 5× (suspension) 1× (red card)	Report	1× (yellow card) 2× (suspension)	Yunost Sport Hall, Zaporizhia; Attendance: 1,500; Referees: Konjičanin, Konjičanin (BIH)

25 February 2021; 18:45	HBC Nantes (France)	24–24	(Germany) THW Kiel	Palais des Sports de Beaulieu, Nantes; Attendance: 0 Referees: Brkic, Jusufhodzic (AUT)
25 February 2021; 18:45	Lazarov 5	(12–9)	Weinhold 4	Palais des Sports de Beaulieu, Nantes; Attendance: 0 Referees: Brkic, Jusufhodzic (AUT)
25 February 2021; 18:45	2× (yellow card) 7× (suspension) 1× (red card)	Report	2× (yellow card) 5× (suspension)	Palais des Sports de Beaulieu, Nantes; Attendance: 0 Referees: Brkic, Jusufhodzic (AUT)

25 February 2021; 20:45	PPD Zagreb (Croatia)	28–35	(Hungary) Telekom Veszprém	Arena Zagreb, Zagreb; Attendance: 0 Referees: Mandák, Rudinský (SVK)
25 February 2021; 20:45	Leimeter, Perić 5	(11–17)	Mahé, Nilsson 6	Arena Zagreb, Zagreb; Attendance: 0 Referees: Mandák, Rudinský (SVK)
25 February 2021; 20:45	1× (yellow card) 2× (suspension)	Report	1× (yellow card) 2× (suspension)	Arena Zagreb, Zagreb; Attendance: 0 Referees: Mandák, Rudinský (SVK)

2 March 2021 (Note: The match, originally scheduled for 18 February 2021, was postponed.); 20:45	THW Kiel (Germany)	33–29	(Slovenia) Celje Pivovarna Laško	Sparkassen-Arena, Kiel; Attendance: 0 Referees: Leszczyński, Piechota (POL)
2 March 2021; 20:45	Ekberg, M. Landin Jacobsen 5	(19–15)	Mazej 6	Sparkassen-Arena, Kiel; Attendance: 0 Referees: Leszczyński, Piechota (POL)
2 March 2021; 20:45	1× (yellow card) 1× (suspension)	Report	1× (yellow card) 1× (suspension)	Sparkassen-Arena, Kiel; Attendance: 0 Referees: Leszczyński, Piechota (POL)

3 March 2021; 18:45	Barça (Spain)	42–34	(Ukraine) Motor	Palau Blaugrana, Barcelona; Attendance: 40; Referees: Caçador, Nicolau (POR)
3 March 2021; 18:45	Mem 8	(23–18)	Bokhan 11	Palau Blaugrana, Barcelona; Attendance: 40; Referees: Caçador, Nicolau (POR)
3 March 2021; 18:45	1× (yellow card) 1× (suspension)	Report	5× (suspension)	Palau Blaugrana, Barcelona; Attendance: 40; Referees: Caçador, Nicolau (POR)

4 March 2021; 17:00	THW Kiel (Germany)	36–30	(Croatia) PPD Zagreb	Sparkassen-Arena, Kiel; Attendance: 0 Referees: Gasmi, Gasmi (FRA)
4 March 2021; 17:00	Sunnefeldt 9	(23–15)	Matanović 6	Sparkassen-Arena, Kiel; Attendance: 0 Referees: Gasmi, Gasmi (FRA)
4 March 2021; 17:00	1× (yellow card) 4× (suspension)	Report	1× (yellow card) 5× (suspension)	Sparkassen-Arena, Kiel; Attendance: 0 Referees: Gasmi, Gasmi (FRA)

Cancelled (Note: The match, originally scheduled for 3 March 2021, was postponed.)	Telekom Veszprém (Hungary)	5–5	(France) HBC Nantes

Cancelled (Note: The match, originally scheduled for 3 March 2021, was postponed.)	Aalborg Håndbold (Denmark)	0–10	(Slovenia) Celje Pivovarna Laško

Cancelled (Note: The match, originally scheduled for 10 February 2021, was postponed.)	Motor (Ukraine)	10–0	(Germany) THW Kiel
