= 2020–21 EHF Champions League knockout stage =

The 2020–21 EHF Champions League knockout stage began on 31 March with the playoffs and ended on 13 June 2021 with the final at the Lanxess Arena in Cologne, Germany, to decide the winners of the 2020–21 EHF Champions League. On 10 February 2021, after a decision by the EHF Executive Committee, it was announced that all 16 teams advance from the group stage.

== Format ==
In the Play-offs, the first-placed team from one group faced the eighth-placed team from the other group, the second-placed team faced the seventh-placed and so on. The eight winning teams advanced to the quarterfinals. The four quarterfinal winners qualified for the final four tournament at the Lanxess Arena in Cologne, Germany.

== Qualified teams ==
Group
Group	First place	Second place	Third place	Fourth place	Fifth place	Sixth place	Seventh place	Eighth place
A	(Germany) SG Flensburg-Handewitt	(France) Paris Saint-Germain	(Poland) Łomża Vive Kielce	(Belarus) Meshkov Brest	(Portugal) FC Porto	(Hungary) MOL-Pick Szeged	(North Macedonia) Vardar 1961	(Norway) Elverum Håndball
B	(Spain) Barça	(Hungary) Telekom Veszprém	(Germany) THW Kiel	(Denmark) Aalborg Håndbold	(Ukraine) Motor	(France) HBC Nantes	(Slovenia) Celje Pivovarna Laško	(Croatia) PPD Zagreb

== Play-offs ==
On 29 March 2021 the European Handball Federation has issued an overview on what happens if matches cannot be played in the upcoming play-offs of the EHF Champions League Men due to reasons related to the COVID-19 pandemic. If a team reports positive cases of COVID-19 and the match could not be played, this pairing would be decided by playing both matches (1st and 2nd leg) as a so called ‘double game’ before 8 April 2021, the date when the last second-leg matches are scheduled. If a second-leg match was not played on 7–8 April 2021, as a consequence of this and following the principle that the party responsible is liable for, in this case, the fact that the match cannot be played, a team which was not in the position to play its scheduled game on the second weekend would be excluded from the competition regardless of the result in the first-leg game. The opponents would subsequently qualify for the quarter-finals.

=== Overview ===
Team 1	Agg.	Team 2	1st leg	2nd leg
HBC Nantes (France)	58–56	(Poland) Łomża Vive Kielce	24–25	34–31
MOL-Pick Szeged (Hungary)	56–66	(Germany) THW Kiel	28–33	28–33
Motor (Ukraine)	55–60	(Belarus) Meshkov Brest	32–30	23–30
FC Porto (Portugal)	56–56 (a)	(Denmark) Aalborg Håndbold	32–29	24–27
PPD Zagreb (Croatia)	0–20 (Note: The matches, scheduled for 7 and 8 April 2021, were assessed by the EHF after Zagreb had several cases of positive COVID-19 tests.)	(Germany) SG Flensburg-Handewitt	0–10	0–10
Elverum Håndball (Norway)	44–76	(Spain) Barça	25–37	19–39
Celje Pivovarna Laško (Slovenia)	47–68	(France) Paris Saint-Germain	24–37	23–31
Vardar 1961 (North Macedonia)	57–80	(Hungary) Telekom Veszprém	27–41	30–39

=== Matches ===
31 March 2021; 20:45	HBC Nantes (France)	24–25	(Poland) Łomża Vive Kielce	H Arena, Nantes; Attendance: 0 (Note: The match was played behind closed doors due to the COVID-19 pandemic.); Referees: Kurtagic, Wetterwik (SWE)
31 March 2021; 20:45	Lazarov, Pechmalbec 5	(14–12)	A. Dujshebaev 6	H Arena, Nantes; Attendance: 0 Referees: Kurtagic, Wetterwik (SWE)
31 March 2021; 20:45	1× (yellow card) 3× (suspension) 1× (red card)	Report	1× (yellow card) 3× (suspension)	H Arena, Nantes; Attendance: 0 Referees: Kurtagic, Wetterwik (SWE)

7 April 2021; 20:45	Łomża Vive Kielce (Poland)	31–34	(France) HBC Nantes	Hala Legionów, Kielce; Attendance: 0 Referees: Horáček, Novotný (CZE)
7 April 2021; 20:45	Kulesh 6	(13–15)	Rivera Folch 9	Hala Legionów, Kielce; Attendance: 0 Referees: Horáček, Novotný (CZE)
7 April 2021; 20:45	1× (yellow card) 4× (suspension)	Report	1× (yellow card) 4× (suspension)	Hala Legionów, Kielce; Attendance: 0 Referees: Horáček, Novotný (CZE)

HBC Nantes won 58–56 on aggregate.

31 March 2021; 18:45	MOL-Pick Szeged (Hungary)	28–33	(Germany) THW Kiel	Városi Sportcsarnok, Szeged; Attendance: 0 Referees: Nikolov, Nachevski (MKD)
31 March 2021; 18:45	Radivojević 6	(13–21)	Sagosen 8	Városi Sportcsarnok, Szeged; Attendance: 0 Referees: Nikolov, Nachevski (MKD)
31 March 2021; 18:45	2× (suspension)	Report	1× (yellow card) 4× (suspension)	Városi Sportcsarnok, Szeged; Attendance: 0 Referees: Nikolov, Nachevski (MKD)

7 April 2021; 18:45	THW Kiel (Germany)	33–28	(Hungary) MOL-Pick Szeged	Wunderino-Arena, Kiel; Attendance: 0 Referees: Madsen, Mortensen (DEN)
7 April 2021; 18:45	Sagosen 9	(18–15)	Radivojević 7	Wunderino-Arena, Kiel; Attendance: 0 Referees: Madsen, Mortensen (DEN)
7 April 2021; 18:45	2× (yellow card) 4× (suspension)	Report	4× (suspension)	Wunderino-Arena, Kiel; Attendance: 0 Referees: Madsen, Mortensen (DEN)

THW Kiel won 66–56 on aggregate.

1 April 2021 (Note: The match, originally scheduled for 31 March, was rescheduled to 1 April 2021.); 18:45	Motor (Ukraine)	32–30	(Belarus) Meshkov Brest	Yunost Sport Hall, Zaporizhia; Attendance: 1,500; Referees: Jurinović, Mrvica (CRO)
1 April 2021; 18:45	Malašinskas 7	(15–12)	Baranau 9	Yunost Sport Hall, Zaporizhia; Attendance: 1,500; Referees: Jurinović, Mrvica (CRO)
1 April 2021; 18:45	3× (yellow card) 4× (suspension)	Report	2× (yellow card) 2× (suspension)	Yunost Sport Hall, Zaporizhia; Attendance: 1,500; Referees: Jurinović, Mrvica (CRO)

8 April 2021; 18:45	Meshkov Brest (Belarus)	30–23	(Ukraine) Motor	Universal Sports Complex Victoria, Brest; Attendance: 1,750; Referees: Lah, Sok (SLO)
8 April 2021; 18:45	Vailupau 8	(16–8)	Pukhouski 7	Universal Sports Complex Victoria, Brest; Attendance: 1,750; Referees: Lah, Sok (SLO)
8 April 2021; 18:45	2× (yellow card) 6× (suspension)	Report	1× (yellow card) 4× (suspension) 1× (red card)	Universal Sports Complex Victoria, Brest; Attendance: 1,750; Referees: Lah, Sok (SLO)

Meshkov Brest won 60–55 on aggregate.

1 April 2021; 20:45	FC Porto (Portugal)	32–29	(Denmark) Aalborg Håndbold	Dragão Arena, Porto; Attendance: 0 Referees: Nikolić, Stojković (SRB)
1 April 2021; 20:45	Iturriza 8	(18–14)	Barthold 8	Dragão Arena, Porto; Attendance: 0 Referees: Nikolić, Stojković (SRB)
1 April 2021; 20:45	2× (yellow card) 2× (suspension)	Report	3× (yellow card) 3× (suspension)	Dragão Arena, Porto; Attendance: 0 Referees: Nikolić, Stojković (SRB)

7 April 2021; 18:45	Aalborg Håndbold (Denmark)	27–24	(Portugal) FC Porto	Jutlander Bank Arena, Aalborg; Attendance: 1 Referees: Kurtagic, Wetterwik (SWE)
7 April 2021; 18:45	Claar 6	(10–9)	Iturriza 6	Jutlander Bank Arena, Aalborg; Attendance: 1 Referees: Kurtagic, Wetterwik (SWE)
7 April 2021; 18:45	2× (suspension)	Report	1× (yellow card) 2× (suspension)	Jutlander Bank Arena, Aalborg; Attendance: 1 Referees: Kurtagic, Wetterwik (SWE)

56–56 on aggregate. Aalborg Håndbold won on away goals

Cancelled (Note: The match, originally scheduled for 1 April, was rescheduled to 7 April 2021 and later postponed.)	PPD Zagreb (Croatia)	0–10	(Germany) SG Flensburg-Handewitt

Cancelled (Note: The match, originally scheduled for 8 April 2021 was postponed.)	SG Flensburg-Handewitt (Germany)	10–0	(Croatia) PPD Zagreb

2 April 2021 (Note: The match, originally scheduled for 31 March, was rescheduled to 2 April 2021.); 18:45	Elverum Håndball (Norway)	25–37	(Spain) Barça	Palau Blaugrana, Barcelona (Note: The match was moved from the Terningen Arena, Elverum.); Attendance: 686; Referees: Baumgart, Wild (GER)
2 April 2021; 18:45	Blonz, Solstad 6	(12–19)	Mem 7	Palau Blaugrana, Barcelona; Attendance: 686; Referees: Baumgart, Wild (GER)
2 April 2021; 18:45	2× (yellow card) 3× (suspension)	Report	1× (yellow card) 1× (suspension)	Palau Blaugrana, Barcelona; Attendance: 686; Referees: Baumgart, Wild (GER)

5 April 2021 (Note: The match, originally scheduled for 7 April, was rescheduled to 5 April 2021.); 18:45	Barça (Spain)	39–19	(Norway) Elverum Håndball	Palau Blaugrana, Barcelona; Attendance: 645; Referees: Bíró, Kiss (HUN)
5 April 2021; 18:45	Diocou 6	(20–10)	Máthé 6	Palau Blaugrana, Barcelona; Attendance: 645; Referees: Bíró, Kiss (HUN)
5 April 2021; 18:45	1× (suspension)	Report	1× (yellow card) 2× (suspension)	Palau Blaugrana, Barcelona; Attendance: 645; Referees: Bíró, Kiss (HUN)

Barça won 76–44 on aggregate.

1 April 2021; 20:45	Celje Pivovarna Laško (Slovenia)	24–37	(France) Paris Saint-Germain	Zlatorog Arena, Celje; Attendance: 0 Referees: Brunner, Salah (SUI)
1 April 2021; 20:45	Dragašević, Mlakar 6	(11–21)	Nahi 10	Zlatorog Arena, Celje; Attendance: 0 Referees: Brunner, Salah (SUI)
1 April 2021; 20:45	2× (suspension)	Report	1× (yellow card) 3× (suspension)	Zlatorog Arena, Celje; Attendance: 0 Referees: Brunner, Salah (SUI)

8 April 2021; 20:45	Paris Saint-Germain (France)	31–23	(Slovenia) Celje Pivovarna Laško	Stade Pierre de Coubertin, Paris; Attendance: 0 Referees: Santos, Fonseca (POR)
8 April 2021; 20:45	Nahi 7	(14–12)	Grošelj 6	Stade Pierre de Coubertin, Paris; Attendance: 0 Referees: Santos, Fonseca (POR)
8 April 2021; 20:45	2× (suspension)	Report	2× (yellow card) 3× (suspension)	Stade Pierre de Coubertin, Paris; Attendance: 0 Referees: Santos, Fonseca (POR)

Paris Saint-Germain won 68–47 on aggregate.

1 April 2021; 18:45	Vardar 1961 (North Macedonia)	27–41	(Hungary) Telekom Veszprém	Jane Sandanski Arena, Skopje; Attendance: 0 Referees: Pavićević, Ražnatović (MNE)
1 April 2021; 18:45	Čupić 8	(11–21)	Marguč 8	Jane Sandanski Arena, Skopje; Attendance: 0 Referees: Pavićević, Ražnatović (MNE)
1 April 2021; 18:45	1× (yellow card) 2× (suspension)	Report	1× (yellow card) 4× (suspension)	Jane Sandanski Arena, Skopje; Attendance: 0 Referees: Pavićević, Ražnatović (MNE)

8 April 2021; 18:45	Telekom Veszprém (Hungary)	39–30	(North Macedonia) Vardar 1961	Veszprém Aréna, Veszprém; Attendance: 0 Referees: Marìn, García (ESP)
8 April 2021; 18:45	Nilsson, Shishkaryov 6	(20–15)	three players 5	Veszprém Aréna, Veszprém; Attendance: 0 Referees: Marìn, García (ESP)
8 April 2021; 18:45	1× (yellow card) 1× (suspension)	Report	1× (yellow card) 4× (suspension)	Veszprém Aréna, Veszprém; Attendance: 0 Referees: Marìn, García (ESP)

Telekom Veszprém won 80–57 on aggregate.

== Quarterfinals ==
=== Overview ===
Team 1	Agg.	Team 2	1st leg	2nd leg
HBC Nantes (France)	62–60	(Hungary) Telekom Veszprém	32–28	30–32
THW Kiel (Germany)	59–63	(France) Paris Saint-Germain	31–29	28–34
Meshkov Brest (Belarus)	57–73	(Spain) Barça	29–33	28–40
Aalborg Håndbold (Denmark)	55–54	(Germany) SG Flensburg-Handewitt	26–21	29–33

=== Matches ===
13 May 2021; 20:45	HBC Nantes (France)	32–28	(Hungary) Telekom Veszprém	H Arena, Nantes; Attendance: 0 Referees: Nikolov, Nachevski (MKD)
13 May 2021; 20:45	Rivera Folch 6	(16–12)	Marguč 8	H Arena, Nantes; Attendance: 0 Referees: Nikolov, Nachevski (MKD)
13 May 2021; 20:45	1× (yellow card) 5× (suspension)	Report	1× (yellow card) 2× (suspension)	H Arena, Nantes; Attendance: 0 Referees: Nikolov, Nachevski (MKD)

20 May 2021; 18:45	Telekom Veszprém (Hungary)	32–30	(France) HBC Nantes	Veszprém Aréna, Veszprém; Attendance: 4,650; Referees: Schulze, Tönnies (GER)
20 May 2021; 18:45	Nenadić 7	(18–15)	Balaguer 6	Veszprém Aréna, Veszprém; Attendance: 4,650; Referees: Schulze, Tönnies (GER)
20 May 2021; 18:45	2× (yellow card) 5× (suspension) 1× (red card)	Report	1× (yellow card) 3× (suspension)	Veszprém Aréna, Veszprém; Attendance: 4,650; Referees: Schulze, Tönnies (GER)

HBC Nantes won 62–60 on aggregate.

12 May 2021; 20:45	THW Kiel (Germany)	31–29	(France) Paris Saint-Germain	Wunderino-Arena, Kiel; Attendance: 1 Referees: Gubica, Milošević (CRO)
12 May 2021; 20:45	Reinkind 10	(14–15)	Nahi 8	Wunderino-Arena, Kiel; Attendance: 1 Referees: Gubica, Milošević (CRO)
12 May 2021; 20:45	2× (yellow card) 4× (suspension)	Report	1× (yellow card) 5× (suspension)	Wunderino-Arena, Kiel; Attendance: 1 Referees: Gubica, Milošević (CRO)

19 May 2021; 18:45	Paris Saint-Germain (France)	34–28	(Germany) THW Kiel	Stade Pierre de Coubertin, Paris; Attendance: 800; Referees: López, Ramírez (ESP)
19 May 2021; 18:45	Prandi 9	(16–15)	Ekberg 7	Stade Pierre de Coubertin, Paris; Attendance: 800; Referees: López, Ramírez (ESP)
19 May 2021; 18:45	4× (suspension)	Report	1× (yellow card) 5× (suspension) 1× (red card)	Stade Pierre de Coubertin, Paris; Attendance: 800; Referees: López, Ramírez (ESP)

Paris Saint-Germain won 63–59 on aggregate.

12 May 2021; 18:45	Meshkov Brest (Belarus)	29–33	(Spain) Barça	Universal Sports Complex Victoria, Brest; Attendance: 3,110; Referees: Hansen, Madsen (DEN)
12 May 2021; 18:45	Vailupau 11	(16–17)	Gómez 7	Universal Sports Complex Victoria, Brest; Attendance: 3,110; Referees: Hansen, Madsen (DEN)
12 May 2021; 18:45	3× (yellow card) 1× (suspension)	Report	2× (suspension)	Universal Sports Complex Victoria, Brest; Attendance: 3,110; Referees: Hansen, Madsen (DEN)

20 May 2021; 20:45	Barça (Spain)	40–28	(Belarus) Meshkov Brest	Palau Blaugrana, Barcelona; Attendance: 874; Referees: Horváth, Marton (HUN)
20 May 2021; 20:45	Mortensen 7	(21–13)	Vailupau 7	Palau Blaugrana, Barcelona; Attendance: 874; Referees: Horváth, Marton (HUN)
20 May 2021; 20:45	1× (yellow card) 3× (suspension)	Report	1× (yellow card) 3× (suspension)	Palau Blaugrana, Barcelona; Attendance: 874; Referees: Horváth, Marton (HUN)

Barça won 73–57 on aggregate.

13 May 2021; 18:45	Aalborg Håndbold (Denmark)	26–21	(Germany) SG Flensburg-Handewitt	Jutlander Bank Arena, Aalborg; Attendance: 0 Referees: Sondors, Līcis (LAT)
13 May 2021; 18:45	Claar, Sandell 8	(13–10)	Gottfridsson 5	Jutlander Bank Arena, Aalborg; Attendance: 0 Referees: Sondors, Līcis (LAT)
13 May 2021; 18:45	2× (yellow card) 2× (suspension)	Report	1× (yellow card) 5× (suspension)	Jutlander Bank Arena, Aalborg; Attendance: 0 Referees: Sondors, Līcis (LAT)

19 May 2021; 20:45	SG Flensburg-Handewitt (Germany)	33–29	(Denmark) Aalborg Håndbold	Flens-Arena, Flensburg; Attendance: 0 Referees: Bonaventura, Bonaventura (FRA)
19 May 2021; 20:45	Golla, Rød 9	(14–16)	Claar 6	Flens-Arena, Flensburg; Attendance: 0 Referees: Bonaventura, Bonaventura (FRA)
19 May 2021; 20:45	2× (yellow card) 5× (suspension)	Report	6× (suspension)	Flens-Arena, Flensburg; Attendance: 0 Referees: Bonaventura, Bonaventura (FRA)

Aalborg Håndbold won 55–54 on aggregate.

== Final four ==
The final four was held at the Lanxess Arena in Cologne, Germany on 12 and 13 June 2021. The draw was held on 25 May 2021.

=== Bracket ===
Semi-finals
12 June
(France) Paris Saint-Germain	33
(Denmark) Aalborg Håndbold	35
12 June
(Spain) Barça	31
(France) HBC Nantes	26

Final
13 June
(Denmark) Aalborg Håndbold	23
(Spain) Barça	36
Third place
13 June
(France) Paris Saint-Germain	31
(France) HBC Nantes	28

=== Semifinals ===
12 June 2021; 15:15	Paris Saint-Germain (France)	33–35	(Denmark) Aalborg Håndbold	Lanxess Arena, Cologne; Attendance: 1,000; Referees: Lah, Sok (SLO)
12 June 2021; 15:15	Remili 7	(15–13)	Claar 9	Lanxess Arena, Cologne; Attendance: 1,000; Referees: Lah, Sok (SLO)
12 June 2021; 15:15	3× (suspension)	Report	3× (yellow card) 2× (suspension)	Lanxess Arena, Cologne; Attendance: 1,000; Referees: Lah, Sok (SLO)

12 June 2021; 18:00	Barça (Spain)	31–26	(France) HBC Nantes	Lanxess Arena, Cologne; Attendance: 1,000; Referees: Kurtagic, Wetterwik (SWE)
12 June 2021; 18:00	Mem 6	(15–13)	Rivera Folch 6	Lanxess Arena, Cologne; Attendance: 1,000; Referees: Kurtagic, Wetterwik (SWE)
12 June 2021; 18:00	1× (yellow card) 3× (suspension)	Report	1× (yellow card) 3× (suspension)	Lanxess Arena, Cologne; Attendance: 1,000; Referees: Kurtagic, Wetterwik (SWE)

=== Third place game ===
13 June 2021; 15:15	HBC Nantes (France)	28–31	(France) Paris Saint-Germain	Lanxess Arena, Cologne; Attendance: 1,000; Referees: Brunner, Salah (SUI)
13 June 2021; 15:15	Minne 5	(13–17)	Solé 5	Lanxess Arena, Cologne; Attendance: 1,000; Referees: Brunner, Salah (SUI)
13 June 2021; 15:15	1× (yellow card) 6× (suspension)	Report	3× (suspension)	Lanxess Arena, Cologne; Attendance: 1,000; Referees: Brunner, Salah (SUI)

=== Final ===
13 June 2021; 18:00	Barça (Spain)	36–23	(Denmark) Aalborg Håndbold	Lanxess Arena, Cologne; Attendance: 1,000; Referees: Horáček, Novotný (CZE)
13 June 2021; 18:00	Gómez 9	(16–11)	Sandell 8	Lanxess Arena, Cologne; Attendance: 1,000; Referees: Horáček, Novotný (CZE)
13 June 2021; 18:00	1× (suspension)	Report	1× (yellow card) 3× (suspension)	Lanxess Arena, Cologne; Attendance: 1,000; Referees: Horáček, Novotný (CZE)
