= 2019–20 Andebol 1 =

Handball league season

Andebol 1
- Season: 2019–20
- Dates: St. 28 August 2019; End. 16 May 2020; Canceled the 2º Round: 23 March 2020
- Champion: Porto (Note: The season was not completed due to the COVID-19 pandemic in Portugal. FC Porto qualified for the 2020–21 EHF Champions League for being in 1st place of the Andebol 1 classification table at the time of the cancellation, but was not declared champion.)
- Champions League: Porto; Sporting CP
- European League: Benfica
- European Cup: Belenenses
- Top goalscorer: Pedro Cruz; Águas Santas (216 goals)

The 2019–20 Andebol 1 (known as the Campeonato Placard Andebol 1) was the 68th season of the Portuguese premier handball league. It rams from 28 August 2019 to 16 May 2020. FC Porto qualified for the 2020–21 EHF Champions League for being in 1st place of the Andebol 1 classification table at the time of the cancellation, but was not declared champion.

== Teams ==
The following 14 clubs compete in the Andebol 1 during the 2019–20 season:

Team	Location	Arena
ABC Braga	Braga	Pavilhão Flávio Sá Leite
ADA Maia	Maia	Pavilhão Municipal da Maia
Águas Santas	Águas Santas, Maia	Pavilhão da Associação Atlética de Águas Santas
Avanca	Avanca, Estarreja	Pavilhão Comendador Adelino Dias Costa
Belenenses	Lisbon	Pavilhão Acácio Rosa
Benfica	Lisbon	Pavilhão da Luz Nº 2
Boa Hora	Lisbon	Pavilhão Fernando Tavares
Boavista	Porto	Pavilhão Desportivo da Boavista
Gaia	Vila Nova de Gaia	Pavilhão F.C. Gaia
Horta	Horta (Azores)	Pavilhão Desportivo da Horta
Madeira SAD	Funchal (Madeira)	Pavilhão Desportivo do Funchal
Porto	Porto	Dragão Arena
Póvoa	Póvoa de Varzim	Pavilhão Municipal da Póvoa de Varzim
Sanjoanense	São João da Madeira	Pavilhão Municipal das Travessas
Sporting CP	Lisbon	Pavilhão João Rocha
Vitória de Setúbal	Setúbal	Pavilhão Antoine Velge

== League table ==
Pos	Equipa	Pts	J	V	E	D	GM	GS	SG	PE	Qualificação
1	Porto	77	26	25	1	0	860	628	+232		2020–21 EHF Champions League
2	Sporting CP	75	26	24	1	1	846	618	+228		2020–21 EHF European League
3	Benfica	67	26	20	1	5	777	623	+154		2020–21 EHF European League
4	Belenenses	57	26	15	1	10	622	747	+75		2020–21 EHF European Cup
5	Águas Santas	56	26	15	0	11	761	720	+41
6	ABC Braga	54	26	13	2	11	679	667	+12
7	Gaia	53	26	13	1	12	746	784	-38
8	Madeira SAD	49	26	11	1	14	652	687	-35
9	ADA Maia	46	26	10	0	16	711	772	-61
10	Boa Hora	45	26	9	1	16	636	742	-106
11	Avanca	44	26	8	2	17	645	742	-41
12	Horta	43	26	8	1	17	645	740	-95
13	Boavista	32	26	2	2	22	584	748	-164
14	Vitória de Setúbal	30	26	1	1	23	568	778	-202

=== Canceled the Second Round ===
On April 29, 2020, due to the coronavirus (COVID-19), the handball, basketball, roller hockey, and volleyball championships were eliminated by the respective federations, that is, the second phase of the championship was not held. However, those who qualified for European competitions were Porto and Sporting CP for the 2020–21 EHF Champions League Group Stage, Benfica for the 2020–21 EHF European League, and Belenenses for the 2020–21 EHF European Cup.

== Top Three goalscorers ==
Rank	Player	Club	Goals
1	(Portugal) Pedro Cruz	Águas Santas	216
2	(Portugal) Martim Costa	Gaia	174
3	(Serbia) Petar Djordjic	Benfica	152
