= 2020–21 EHF Champions League =

European handball competition

EHF Champions League
- 2020–21

Tournament information
- Sport: Handball
- Location: Lanxess Arena (FINAL4)
- Dates: 16 September 2020–13 June 2021
- Teams: 16
- Website: ehfcl.com

Final positions
- Champions: (Spain) Barça
- Runner-up: (Denmark) Aalborg Håndbold

Tournament statistics
- Matches played: 123
- Goals scored: 7405 (60.2 per match)
- Attendance: 53,304 (433 per match)
- Top scorer(s): (Spain) Valero Rivera Folch (95 goals)

The 2020–21 EHF Champions League was the 61st edition of Europe's premier club handball tournament and the 28th edition under the current EHF Champions League format.

Due to the COVID-19 pandemic, each local health department dictated the number of spectators allowed at a given match.

Barça defeated Aalborg Håndbold, 36–23, to win their tenth title.

== Format ==
The competition begins with a group stage featuring 16 teams divided in two groups. Matches are played in a double round-robin system with home-and-away fixtures. In Groups A and B, originally the top two teams qualify for the quarterfinals, with teams ranked 3rd to 6th entering the playoffs. After a decision by the EHF, all teams advanced.

The knockout stage included four rounds: the round of 16, quarterfinals, and a final-four tournament comprising two semifinals and the final. The teams were paired against each other in two-legged home-and-away matches, with the aggregate winners qualifying to the next round.

In the final four tournament, the semifinals and the final were played as single matches at a pre-selected host venue.

== Teams ==
Location of teams of the 2020–21 EHF Champions League group stage.
Red: Group A; Blue: Group B.

A total of 24 teams from 16 countries submitted their application for a place in the competition's group stage before the deadline of 10 June 2020. The final list of 16 participants was revealed by the EHF Executive Committee on 19 June. Ten teams were registered according to fixed places, while six were granted wild cards.

Participating teams
(France) Paris Saint-Germain (1st)	(Germany) THW Kiel (1st)	(North Macedonia) Vardar 1961 (1st)	(Hungary) Telekom Veszprém (1st)
(Spain) Barça (1st)	(Poland) Łomża Vive Kielce (1st)	(Denmark) Aalborg Handbold (1st)	(Croatia) PPD Zagreb (1st)
(Portugal) FC Porto (1st)	(Germany) SG Flensburg-Handewitt (2nd)	(Belarus) Meshkov Brest (WC)	(France) HBC Nantes (WC)
(Hungary) MOL-Pick Szeged (WC)	(Norway) Elverum Håndball (WC)	(Slovenia) Celje Pivovarna Laško (WC)	(Ukraine) Motor (WC)

Wildcard rejection
(Denmark) GOG Håndbold	(North Macedonia) RK Eurofarm Pelister	(Poland) Orlen Wisła Płock	(Portugal) Sporting CP
(Romania) Dinamo București	(Spain) CB Ademar León	(Switzerland) Kadetten Schaffhausen	(Turkey) Beşiktaş

== Group stage ==
The draw was held on 1 July 2020 at the EHF headquarters in Vienna, Austria. The 16 teams were drawn into two groups of eight, with the restriction that teams from the same national association could not be drawn into the same group.

In each group, teams play against each other in a double round-robin format, with home and away matches. After completion of the group stage matches, the top two teams from each group would have qualified directly for the quarterfinals, and the four teams ranked 3rd–6th advance to the playoffs, but on 10 February 2021, it was announced that all 16 teams advance from the group stage.

Matches were played on Wednesdays and Thursdays, with starting times at 18:45 and 20:45 (CET/CEST).

=== Tiebreakers ===
In the group stage, teams are ranked according to points (2 points for a win, 1 point for a draw, 0 points for a loss). After completion of the group stage, if two or more teams have scored the same number of points, the ranking will be determined as follows:

1. Highest number of points in matches between the teams directly involved;
2. Superior goal difference in matches between the teams directly involved;
3. Highest number of goals scored in matches between the teams directly involved (or in the away match in case of a two-team tie);
4. Superior goal difference in all matches of the group;
5. Highest number of plus goals in all matches of the group;

If the ranking of one of these teams is determined, the above criteria are consecutively followed until the ranking of all teams is determined. If no ranking can be determined, a decision shall be obtained by EHF through drawing of lots.

During the group stage, only criteria 4–5 apply to determine the provisional ranking of teams.

=== Group A ===
Pos	Team	Pld	W	D	L	GF	GA	GD	Pts	Qualification	FLE	PAR	KIE	BRE	POR	SZE	VAR	ELV
1	(Germany) SG Flensburg-Handewitt	14	10	1	3	341	336	+5	21	Play-offs	—	28–27	31–30	29–29	36–29	26–24	0–10	37–35
2	(France) Paris Saint-Germain	14	9	1	4	388	327	+61	19 (Note: Paris 70–61 Kielce)	Play-offs	28–29	—	37–26	33–26	29–28	10–0	5–5	35–29
3	(Poland) Łomża Vive Kielce	14	9	1	4	442	414	+28	19	Play-offs	28–31	35–33	—	34–27	32–30	26–23	36–29	39–29
4	(Belarus) Meshkov Brest	14	7	1	6	383	380	+3	15	Play-offs	26–28	32–31	35–30	—	10–0	26–24	24–22	29–27
5	(Portugal) FC Porto	14	5	2	7	361	352	+9	12 (Note: Porto 56–54 Pick Szeged)	Play-offs	10–0	31–34	32–32	27–25	—	25–19	27–24	28–30
6	(Hungary) MOL-Pick Szeged	14	6	0	8	318	329	−11	12	Play-offs	0–10	29–32	26–30	30–27	35–31	—	34–33	36–27
7	(North Macedonia) Vardar 1961	14	3	3	8	335	350	−15	9	Play-offs	31–26	0–10	29–33	32–36	25–25	26–28	—	34–34
8	(Norway) Elverum Håndball	14	2	1	11	387	457	−70	5	Play-offs	29–30	29–44	22–31	33–31	31–38	0–10	32–35	—

Source: EHF

=== Group B ===
Pos	Team	Pld	W	D	L	GF	GA	GD	Pts	Qualification	BAR	VES	KIE	ALB	ZAP	NAN	CEL	ZAG
1	(Spain) Barça	14	14	0	0	505	412	+93	28	Play-offs	—	37–30	29–25	42–33	42–34	30–29	42–28	45–27
2	(Hungary) Telekom Veszprém	14	9	2	3	443	392	+51	20	Play-offs	34–37	—	41–33	30–32	34–30	5–5	39–24	37–25
3	(Germany) THW Kiel	14	7	2	5	394	378	+16	16	Play-offs	26–32	31–31	—	28–26	34–23	27–35	33–29	36–30
4	(Denmark) Aalborg Håndbold	14	7	0	7	397	411	−14	14 (Note: Aalborg 67–56 Motor)	Play-offs	32–35	27–33	23–31	—	38–29	32–24	0–10	38–29
5	(Ukraine) Motor	14	7	0	7	389	411	−22	14	Play-offs	25–30	34–37	10–0	27–29	—	29–28	31–29	29–25
6	(France) HBC Nantes	14	5	2	7	388	378	+10	12	Play-offs	27–35	24–28	24–24	38–29	31–32	—	28–30	30–28
7	(Slovenia) Celje Pivovarna Laško	14	4	0	10	372	413	−41	8	Play-offs	29–32	25–29	24–35	29–31	31–32	25–31	—	29–28
8	(Croatia) PPD Zagreb	14	0	0	14	369	462	−93	0	Play-offs	33–37	28–35	21–31	26–27	23–24	24–34	22–30	—

Source: EHF
Notes:

Note All matches ending with a 10–0 (or 5–5) results were assessed by the EHF.

== Knockout stage ==
Originally, the top six teams advanced but on 10 February 2021, after a decision by the EHF Executive Committee, it was announced that all 16 teams advance from the group stage.

=== Play-offs ===
Team 1	Agg.	Team 2	1st leg	2nd leg
HBC Nantes (France)	58–56	(Poland) Łomża Vive Kielce	24–25	34–31
MOL-Pick Szeged (Hungary)	56–66	(Germany) THW Kiel	28–33	28–33
Motor (Ukraine)	55–60	(Belarus) Meshkov Brest	32–30	23–30
FC Porto (Portugal)	56–56 (a)	(Denmark) Aalborg Håndbold	32–29	24–27
PPD Zagreb (Croatia)	0–20 (Note: The matches, scheduled for 7 and 8 April 2021, were assessed by the EHF after Zagreb had several cases of positive COVID-19 tests.)	(Germany) SG Flensburg-Handewitt	0–10	0–10
Elverum Håndball (Norway)	44–76	(Spain) Barça	25–37	19–39
Celje Pivovarna Laško (Slovenia)	47–68	(France) Paris Saint-Germain	24–37	23–31
Vardar 1961 (North Macedonia)	57–80	(Hungary) Telekom Veszprém	27–41	30–39

=== Quarterfinals ===
Team 1	Agg.	Team 2	1st leg	2nd leg
HBC Nantes (France)	62–60	(Hungary) Telekom Veszprém	32–28	30–32
THW Kiel (Germany)	59–63	(France) Paris Saint-Germain	31–29	28–34
Meshkov Brest (Belarus)	57–73	(Spain) Barça	29–33	28–40
Aalborg Håndbold (Denmark)	55–54	(Germany) SG Flensburg-Handewitt	26–21	29–33

=== Final four ===
Semi-finals
12 June
(France) Paris Saint-Germain	33
(Denmark) Aalborg Håndbold	35
12 June
(Spain) Barça	31
(France) HBC Nantes	26

Final
13 June
(Denmark) Aalborg Håndbold	23
(Spain) Barça	36
Third place
13 June
(France) Paris Saint-Germain	31
(France) HBC Nantes	28

==== Final ====
13 June 2021; 18:00	Barça (Spain)	36–23	(Denmark) Aalborg Håndbold	Lanxess Arena, Cologne; Attendance: 1,000; Referees: Horáček, Novotný (CZE)
13 June 2021; 18:00	Gómez 9	(16–11)	Sandell 8	Lanxess Arena, Cologne; Attendance: 1,000; Referees: Horáček, Novotný (CZE)
13 June 2021; 18:00	1× (suspension)	Report	1× (yellow card) 3× (suspension)	Lanxess Arena, Cologne; Attendance: 1,000; Referees: Horáček, Novotný (CZE)

== Statistics and awards ==
=== Top goalscorers ===
Rank	Player	Club	Goals
1	(Spain) Valero Rivera Folch	(France) HBC Nantes	95
2	(France) Dika Mem	(Spain) Barça	93
2	(Belarus) Mikita Vailupau	(Belarus) Meshkov Brest	93
4	(Spain) Aleix Gómez	(Spain) Barça	92
5	(Spain) Alex Dujshebaev	(Poland) Łomża Vive Kielce	90
6	(Denmark) Mikkel Hansen	(France) Paris Saint-Germain	88
7	(Sweden) Niclas Ekberg	(Germany) THW Kiel	83
8	(Serbia) Petar Nenadić	(Hungary) Telekom Veszprém	73
8	(Norway) Sander Sagosen	(Germany) THW Kiel	73
10	(France) Nedim Remili	(France) Paris Saint-Germain	72

=== Awards ===
The all-star team was announced on 11 June 2021.

Position	Player
Goalkeeper	(Denmark) Niklas Landin Jacobsen (THW Kiel)
Right wing	(Spain) Aleix Gómez (Barça)
Right back	(France) Dika Mem (Barça)
Centre back	(Croatia) Luka Cindrić (Barça)
Left back	(Denmark) Mikkel Hansen (Paris Saint-Germain)
Left wing	(Spain) Valero Rivera (HBC Nantes)
Pivot	(France) Ludovic Fabregas (Barça)
MVP	(Spain) Gonzalo Pérez de Vargas (Barça)
Best defender	(Denmark) Henrik Møllgaard (Aalborg Handbold)
Best young player	(France) Dylan Nahi (Paris Saint-Germain)
Best coach	(Spain) Alberto Entrerríos (HBC Nantes)
