= Viachaslau Bokhan =

Belarusian handball player

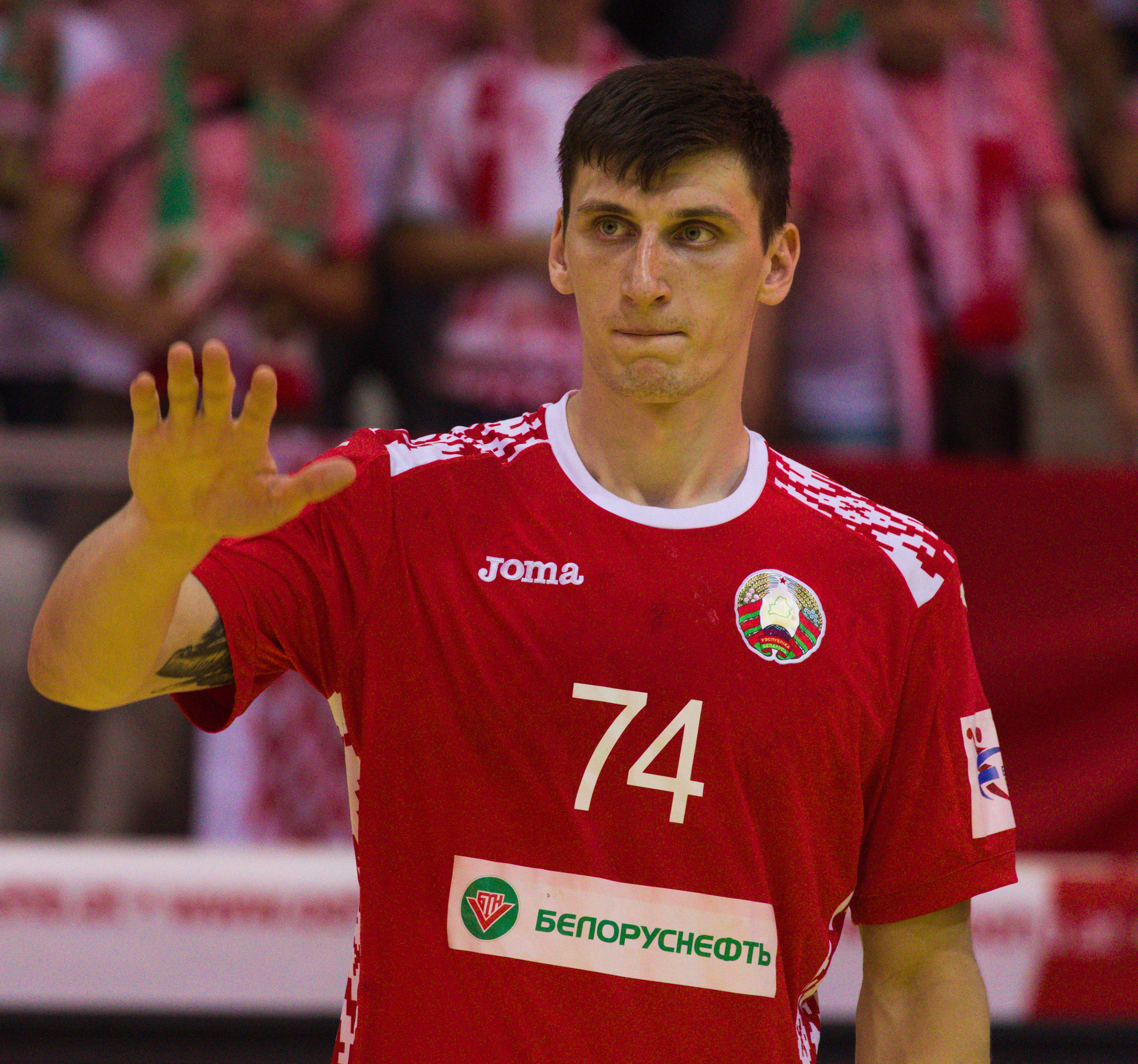

Personal information
- Nationality: Belarusian
- Born: 7 April 1996 (age 30) Novopolotsk, Belarus
- Height: 2.06 m (6 ft 9 in)

Sport
- Sport: Handball
- Position: Pivot
- Current club: Saint Petersburg HC
- Number: 21

Senior clubs
- Years: Team
- 2014–2020: SKA Minsk
- 2020–2022: HC Motor Zaporizhzhia
- 2022: → SKA Minsk
- 2022–2024: Dinamo București
- 2024–: Saint Petersburg HC
National team
Years	Team	Apps	(Gls)
2016–	Belarus	42	(29)

Viachaslau Bokhan (born 7 April 1996) is a Belarusian handball player for Saint Petersburg HC and the Belarusian national team. He participated at the 2018 European Men's Handball Championship.
