= HBC Nantes =

French handball club

- Full name: Handball Club Nantes
- Founded: 1953; 73 years ago
- Arena: Palais des Sports de Beaulieu, Nantes; Hall XXL, Nantes
- Capacity: 5,500; 10,750
- President: Gaël Pelletier
- Head coach: Grégory Cojean
- League: LNH Division 1
- 2024–25: LNH Division 1, 2nd of 16
- Club colours
Home	Away

Handball Club Nantes is a professional handball club team from Nantes, France, that plays in the LNH Division 1.

Location of HBC Nantes

== Crest, colours, supporters ==
=== Naming history ===
Name	Period
Handball Club de Nantes	1953–present

=== Club crest ===
Logo in the 2000s
(-2011)

=== Kits ===
HOME
2012–13	2014–15	2020–21	2021–22	2023–24

AWAY
2012–13	2014–15	2020–21	2021–22	2023–24

== Sports Hall information ==
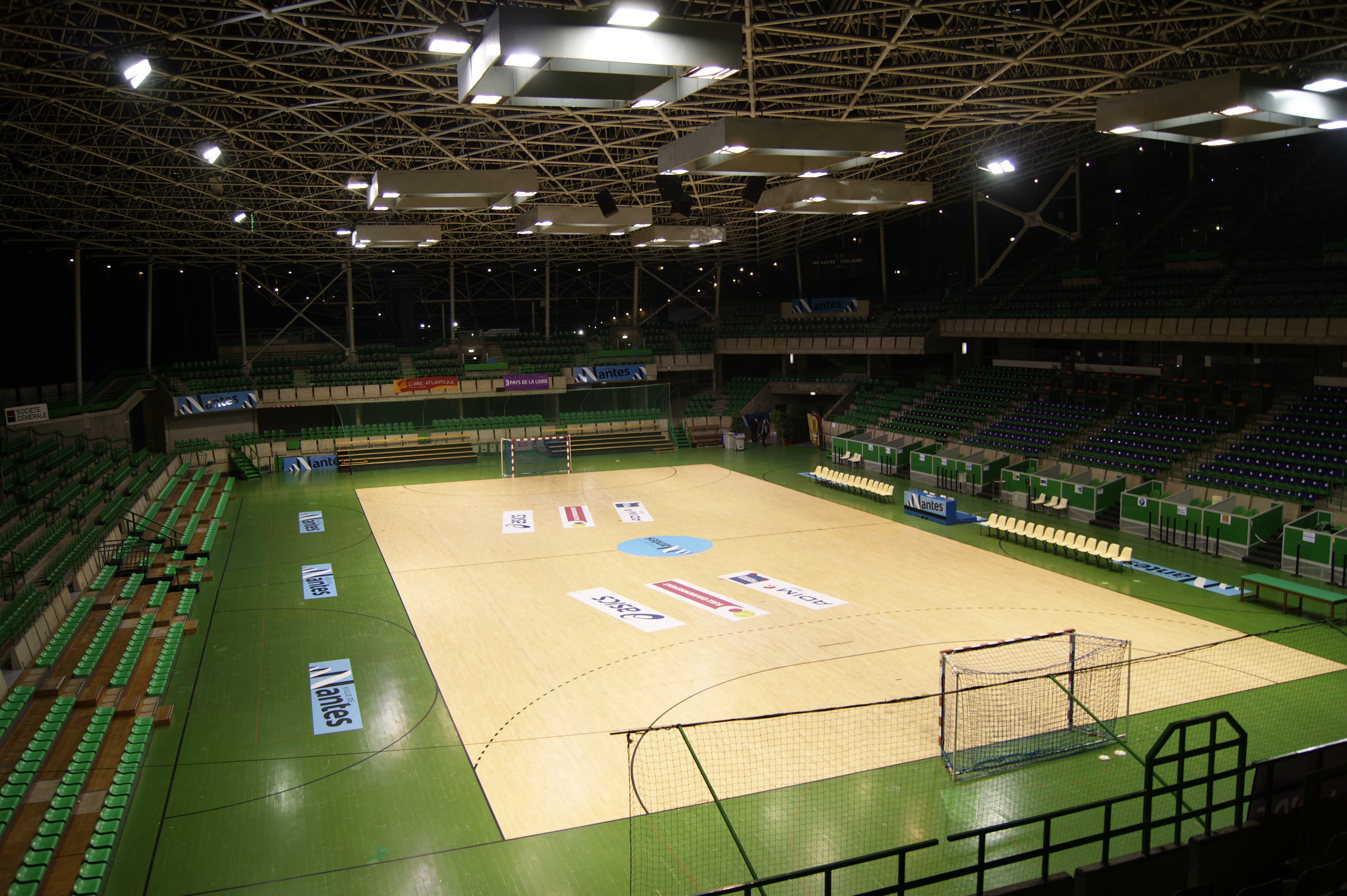
Home hall: Palais des Sports de Beaulieu

- Name: – Palais des Sports de Beaulieu
- City: – Nantes
- Capacity: – 5500
- Address: – 7–9 Rue André Tardieu, 44200 Nantes, France

== Honors ==
- EHF Champions League:

Runner Up : 2017–18
Third Place Match : 2024–25

- EHF Cup:

Runner Up : 2012–13, 2015–16

- France Handball League:

Runner Up : 2016–17, 2019–20, 2021–22, 2023–24, 2024–25

- Coupe de France: 3

Winner : 2016–17, 2022–23, 2023–24
Runner Up : 2014–15, 2021–22, 2025-2026

- Coupe de la Ligue: 2

Winner : 2014–15, 2021–22
Runner Up : 2012–13, 2016–17

- Trophée des champions: 2

Winner : 2017, 2022
Runner Up : 2016

== Team ==
=== Current squad ===
Squad for the 2026-27 season

Goalkeeper

- 1 (Croatia) Ivan Pešić
- 16 (Denmark) Christoffer Bonde

Left Wingers

- 17 (Switzerland) Noam Leopold

Right Wingers

- 13 (Bosnia and Herzegovina) Luka Perić
- 19 (Spain) Kauldi Odriozola

Line player

- 5 (France) André Wenkegheu
- 8 (Denmark) René Antonsen
- 11 (France) Nicolas Tournat
- 15 (Slovenia) Matej Gaber

Left Backs

- 2 (France) Romain Lagarde
- 3 (France) Thibaud Briet
- 7 (Ukraine) Ihor Turchenko

Central Backs

- 6 (Denmark) Victor Norlyk
- 9 (Spain) Ian Tarrafeta
- 10 (Slovenia) Rok Ovniček

Right Backs

- 14 (Spain) Imanol Garciandia
- 18 (Algeria) Ayoub Abdi

=== Transfers ===
Transfers for the 2026–27 season

Joining

- (Ukraine) Ihor Turchenko (LB) from (France) Limoges Handball
- (Spain) Imanol Garciandia (RB) from (Hungary) OTP Bank-Pick Szeged
- (Denmark) René Antonsen (LP) from (Denmark) Aalborg Håndbold
- (Denmark) Christoffer Bonde (GK) from (Denmark) Skjern Håndbold
- (Denmark) Victor Norlyk (CB) from (Denmark) Mors-Thy Håndbold
- (Bosnia and Herzegovina) Luka Perić (RW) from (Slovenia) RK Celje

Leaving

- (Spain) Valero Rivera (LW) (retires)
- (Spain) Ignacio Biosca (GK) to (Germany) VfL Gummersbach
- (Japan) Shuichi Yoshida (LP) to (North Macedonia) GRK Ohrid
- (France) Aymeric Minne (CB) to (Germany) SG Flensburg-Handewitt
- (France) Julien Bos (RB) to (Poland) Industria Kielce
- (France) Théo Avelange-Demouge (RW) to (France) Tremblay Handball
- (France) Salomon Nassequela (RB) to (France) Angers SCO Handball

=== Transfer History ===
Transfers for the 2025–26 season

Joining

- (Spain) Ian Tarrafeta (CB) from (France) Pays d'Aix Université Club

Leaving

- (Serbia) Marko Milosavljević (LB) to (Switzerland) HC Kriens-Luzern
- (France) Lucas De la Bretèche (CB) to (France) Pays d'Aix Université Club

== European record ==
Season	Competition	Round	Club	1st leg	2nd leg	Aggregate
2016–17	EHF Champions League	Group Stage	(Ukraine) HC Motor Zaporizhzhia	26–26	32–34	1st place
2016–17	EHF Champions League	Group Stage	(Turkey) Beşiktaş	33–19	33–28	1st place
2016–17	EHF Champions League	Group Stage	(Romania) CS Dinamo București	26–24	27–26	1st place
2016–17	EHF Champions League	Group Stage	(Denmark) Team Tvis Holstebro	31–26	35–25	1st place
2016–17	EHF Champions League	Group Stage	(Portugal) ABC/UMinho	35–33	34–29	1st place
2016–17	EHF Champions League	PO	(Spain) Logroño	31–25	37–31	68–56
2016–17	EHF Champions League	1/8	(France) Paris Saint-Germain	26–26	27–35	53–61
2017–18	EHF Champions League	Group Stage	(Hungary) SC Pick Szeged	30–26	33–30	3rd place
2017–18	EHF Champions League	Group Stage	(North Macedonia) RK Vardar	23–27	27–26	3rd place
2017–18	EHF Champions League	Group Stage	(Germany) Rhein-Neckar Löwen	26–26	30–30	3rd place
2017–18	EHF Champions League	Group Stage	(Spain) FC Barcelona Handbol	25–31	29–25	3rd place
2017–18	EHF Champions League	Group Stage	(Sweden) IFK Kristianstad	34–25	31–26	3rd place
2017–18	EHF Champions League	Group Stage	(Poland) Wisła Płock	32–30	32–30	3rd place
2017–18	EHF Champions League	Group Stage	(Croatia) RK Zagreb	28–27	22–23	3rd place
2017–18	EHF Champions League	1/8	(Belarus) HC Meshkov Brest	32–24	28–28	60–52
2017–18	EHF Champions League	QF	(Denmark) Skjern Håndbold	33–27	27–27	60–54
2017–18	EHF Champions League	SF	(France) Paris Saint-Germain	32–28		
2017–18	EHF Champions League	F	(France) Montpellier	32–26		
2018–19	EHF Champions League	Group Stage	(France) Paris Saint-Germain	31–35	34–35	4th place
2018–19	EHF Champions League	Group Stage	(Hungary) MOL-Pick Szeged	29–26	28–30	4th place
2018–19	EHF Champions League	Group Stage	(Germany) SG Flensburg-Handewitt	31–34	29–29	4th place
2018–19	EHF Champions League	Group Stage	(Denmark) Skjern Håndbold	35–27	34–32	4th place
2018–19	EHF Champions League	Group Stage	(Croatia) PPD Zagreb	23–20	27–27	4th place
2018–19	EHF Champions League	Group Stage	(Slovenia) Celje Pivovarna Laško	38–27	29–29	4th place
2018–19	EHF Champions League	Group Stage	(Ukraine) HC Motor Zaporizhzhia	23–27	30–30	4th place
2018–19	EHF Champions League	1/8	(Germany) Rhein-Neckar Löwen	30–27	32–34	62–61
2018–19	EHF Champions League	1/4	(Spain) Barcelona Lassa	25–32	26–29	51–61
2020–21	EHF Champions League	Group Stage; Group B	(Spain) Barcelona	27–35	29–30	6th place
2020–21	EHF Champions League	Group Stage; Group B	(Hungary) Telekom Veszprém	24–28	5–5	6th place
2020–21	EHF Champions League	Group Stage; Group B	(Germany) THW Kiel	24–24	35–27	6th place
2020–21	EHF Champions League	Group Stage; Group B	(Denmark) Aalborg	38–29	24–32	6th place
2020–21	EHF Champions League	Group Stage; Group B	(Ukraine) HC Motor Zaporizhzhia	31–32	28–29	6th place
2020–21	EHF Champions League	Group Stage; Group B	(Slovenia) Celje Pivovarna Laško	28–30	32–25	6th place
2020–21	EHF Champions League	Group Stage; Group B	(Croatia) PPD Zagreb	30–28	34–24	6th place
2020–21	EHF Champions League	Last 16	(Poland) Łomża Vive Kielce	24–25	35–31	58–56
2020–21	EHF Champions League	Quarterfinals	(Hungary) Telekom Veszprém	32–28	30–32	62–60
2020–21	EHF Champions League	Semifinal	(Spain) Barça	26–31		
2020–21	EHF Champions League	Third place game	(France) Paris Saint-Germain	28–31		
2021–22	EHF European League	Group Stage; Group B	(Finland) Cocks	40–28	36–25	3rd place
2021–22	EHF European League	Group Stage; Group B	(Germany) TBV Lemgo	27–28	37–37	3rd place
2021–22	EHF European League	Group Stage; Group B	(Denmark) GOG Håndbold	27–24	29–29	3rd place
2021–22	EHF European League	Group Stage; Group B	(Russia) Chekhovskiye Medvedi	35–31	10–0	3rd place
2021–22	EHF European League	Group Stage; Group B	(Portugal) SL Benfica	33–33	30–31	3rd place
2021–22	EHF European League	Last 16	(Germany) Füchse Berlin	25–24	33–30	58–54
2021–22	EHF European League	Quarterfinals	(Germany) SC Magdeburg	25–28	28–30	53–58
2022–23	EHF Champions League	Group Stage; Group B	(Poland) Barlinek Industria Kielce	33–40	30–33	3rd place
2022–23	EHF Champions League	Group Stage; Group B	(Hungary) OTP Bank - Pick Szeged	35–30	28–28	3rd place
2022–23	EHF Champions League	Group Stage; Group B	(Norway) Elverum Håndball	41–30	42–36	3rd place
2022–23	EHF Champions League	Group Stage; Group B	(Slovenia) Celje Pivovarna Laško	35–24	31–32	3rd place
2022–23	EHF Champions League	Group Stage; Group B	(Germany) THW Kiel	38–30	33–37	3rd place
2022–23	EHF Champions League	Group Stage; Group B	(Spain) Barça	29–34	33–37	3rd place
2022–23	EHF Champions League	Group Stage; Group B	(Denmark) Aalborg Håndbold	34–33	35–28	3rd place
2022–23	EHF Champions League	Playoffs	(Poland) Orlen Wisła Płock	32–32	25–25	57–57 (5–4 p)
2023–24	EHF European League	Group Stage; Group A	(Portugal) SL Benfica	37–28	38–34	1st place
2023–24	EHF European League	Group Stage; Group A	(Germany) Rhein-Neckar Löwen	32–36	32–25	1st place
2023–24	EHF European League	Group Stage; Group A	(Sweden) IFK Kristianstad	31–27	31–27	1st place
2023–24	EHF European League	Main round Group I	(Germany) TSV Hannover-Burgdorf	38–32	33–26	1st place
2023–24	EHF European League	Main round Group I	(Poland) Górnik Zabrze	31–23	31–22	1st place
2023–24	EHF European League	Quarterfinals	(Germany) Füchse Berlin	33–33	30–37	63–70
2024–25	EHF Champions League	Group Stage; Group B	(Denmark) Aalborg Håndbold	31–38	29–29	3rd place
2024–25	EHF Champions League	Group Stage; Group B	(Poland) Industria Kielce	23–20	28–28	3rd place
2024–25	EHF Champions League	Group Stage; Group B	(Hungary) OTP Bank - Pick Szeged	32–33	32–29	3rd place
2024–25	EHF Champions League	Group Stage; Group B	(Norway) Kolstad Håndball	44–27	28–29	3rd place
2024–25	EHF Champions League	Group Stage; Group B	(Germany) SC Magdeburg	32–28	29–28	3rd place
2024–25	EHF Champions League	Group Stage; Group B	(Croatia) RK Zagreb	32–29	25–22	3rd place
2024–25	EHF Champions League	Group Stage; Group B	(Spain) Barça	31–31	36–30	3rd place
2024–25	EHF Champions League	Playoffs	(Poland) Orlen Wisła Płock	25–28	29–24	54–52
2024–25	EHF Champions League	Quarterfinals	(Portugal) Sporting CP	28–27	32–30	60–57
2024–25	EHF Champions League	Semifinals	(Germany) Füchse Berlin	24–34		
2024–25	EHF Champions League	Third place game	(Spain) Barça	30–25		
2025–26	EHF Champions League	Group Stage; Group A	(Germany) Füchse Berlin	34–40	37–34	4th place
2025–26	EHF Champions League	Group Stage; Group A	(Hungary) One Veszprém	25–30	33–31	4th place
2025–26	EHF Champions League	Group Stage; Group A	(Norway) Kolstad Håndball	39–24	33–26	4th place
2025–26	EHF Champions League	Group Stage; Group A	(Portugal) Sporting CP	39–28	38–27	4th place
2025–26	EHF Champions League	Group Stage; Group A	(Poland) Industria Kielce	35–27	29–33	4th place
2025–26	EHF Champions League	Group Stage; Group A	(Denmark) Aalborg Håndbold	27–28	24–31	4th place
2025–26	EHF Champions League	Group Stage; Group A	(Romania) CS Dinamo București	35–28	28–29	4th place
2025–26	EHF Champions League	Playoffs	(Denmark) GOG Håndbold	34–33	40–28	74–61
2025–26	EHF Champions League	Quarterfinals	(Spain) Barça	30–32	21–31	51–63
2026–27	EHF Champions League	Group Stage; Group B	(Poland) Orlen Wisła Płock	26–25	27–33	3rd place
2026–27	EHF Champions League	Group Stage; Group B	(North Macedonia) HC Vardar 1961	33–32	27–33	3rd place
2026–27	EHF Champions League	Group Stage; Group B	(Germany) MT Melsungen	23–28	33–25	3rd place
2026–27	EHF European League	Playoffs	(To be determined) TBD	–	–	–

Note All matches ending with a 10–0 or 5–5 results were assessed by the EHF.

== Former club members ==
=== Notable former players ===
- (France) Igor Anić (2014–2015)
- (France) Robin Cantegrel (2008–2017)
- (France) Nicolas Claire (2013–2019)
- (France) Théo Derot (2015–2017)
- (France) Frédéric Dole (2007–2013)
- (France) Cyril Dumoulin (2016–2021)
- (France) (Democratic Republic of the Congo) Rock Feliho (2010–2021)
- (France) Romain Lagarde (2014–2019)
- (France) Aymeric Minne (2019–)
- (France) Olivier Nyokas (2016–2021)
- (France) Mickaël Robin (2021–2022)
- (France) (Morocco) Seufyann Sayad (2009–2014)
- (France) Guillaume Saurina (2017–2018)
- (France) Arnaud Siffert (2011–2013, 2016–2019)
- (France) Nicolas Tournat (2012–2020)
- (France) (Democratic Republic of the Congo) Audräy Tuzolana (2009–2011)
- (Algeria) Ahmed Hadjali (2009–2010)
- (Algeria) Tahar Labane (2010–2011)
- (Argentina) Matías Schulz (2014–2016)
- (Bosnia and Herzegovina) Senjamin Burić (2016–2018, 2019–2020)
- (Brazil) Bruno Souza (2008–2011)
- (Chile) Rodrigo Salinas Muñoz (2015–2016)
- (Croatia) Šime Ivić (2016)
- (Croatia) Jerko Matulić (2016–2018)
- (Croatia) Ivan Pešić (2022–)
- (Denmark) Sebastian Augustinussen (2019–2021)
- (Denmark) Emil Nielsen (2019–2022)
- (Spain) David Balaguer (2015–2022)
- (Spain) Alberto Entrerríos (2012–2016)
- (Spain) Adrià Figueras (2020–2021)
- (Spain) Javier García Rubio (2013–2014)
- (Spain) Eduardo Gurbindo (2016–2021)
- (Spain) Jorge Maqueda (2012–2015, 2022–2024)
- (Spain) Kauldi Odriozola (2022–)
- (Spain) Valero Rivera (2010–2016, 2018–)
- (Spain) Antonio García Robledo (2019–2020)
- (Spain) (Qatar) Borja Vidal (2011–2013)
- (Germany) Dominik Klein (2016–2018)
- (United Kingdom) Gawain Vincent (2010–2013)
- (Hungary) Attila Borsos (1988–1990)
- (Hungary) Rudolf Faluvégi (2017–2019)
- (Iceland) Viktor Gísli Hallgrímsson (2022–)
- (Iceland) Gunnar Steinn Jónsson (2012–2014)
- (Italy) (Croatia) Michele Skatar (2010–2014)
- (North Macedonia) Kiril Lazarov (2017–2022)
- (North Macedonia) (Serbia) Nemanja Pribak (2010–2012)
- (Norway) Espen Lie Hansen (2018–2019)
- (Portugal) Alexandre Cavalcanti (2019–)
- (Portugal) Wilson Davyes (2014–2015)
- (Portugal) Pedro Portela (2021–2023)
- (Russia) Vitaly Komogorov (2015–2016)
- (Russia) Alexander Shkurinskiy (2021–2023)
- (Slovenia) Uroš Bundalo (2016)
- (Slovenia) Rok Ovniček (2019–)
- (Slovenia) Gorazd Škof (2013–2016)
- (Serbia) (France) Dragan Pechmalbec (2012–2022)
- (Serbia) (Croatia) Stefan Vujić (2013–2014)
- (Sweden) Kim Ekdahl du Rietz (2011–2012)
- (Sweden) Linus Persson (2021–2023)
- (Tunisia) Mahmoud Gharbi (2010–2017)
- (Tunisia) Hatem Haraket (2008–2010)
- (Tunisia) Marouen Maggaiz (2008–2014)
- (Tunisia) Aymen Toumi (2013–2015)

=== Former coaches ===
Seasons	Coach	Country
2004–2009	Stéphane Moualek	(France)
2009–2019	Thierry Anti	(France)
2019–2022	Alberto Entrerríos	(Spain)
2022–	Grégory Cojean	(France)
