= Sebastian Barthold =

Norwegian handball player (born 1991)

Personal information
- Full name: Sebastian Hein Barthold
- Nationality: Norwegian
- Born: 27 August 1991 (age 35) Oslo, Norway
- Height: 1.84 m (6 ft 0 in)

Sport
- Sport: Handball
- Position: Left wing
- Current club: SC Magdeburg
- Number: 6

Youth career
- Years: Team
- –2010: Haslum HK

Senior clubs
- Years: Team
- 2010–2017: Haslum HK
- 2017–2025: Aalborg Håndbold
- 2025–2026: SC Magdeburg
- 2026–: Mors-Thy
National team
Years	Team	Apps	(Gls)
2012–	Norway	106	(270)
- Updated on 1 November 2025

Sebastian Hein Barthold (born 27 August 1991) is a Norwegian handball player. He plays for SC Magdeburg and the Norwegian national team.

== Career ==
Barthold started playing handball at the age of 6 in Haslum. He started his career as a pivot, before he was retrained as a left wing. In the 2009-10 season he made his debut for Haslum HK, and in his first season he won the Norwegian Championship.

In 2017 he joined Danish side Aalborg Håndbold. Here he won the Danish Championship in 2019, 2020, 2021, 2024 and the Danish Cup in 2018. In 2021 he reached the final of the EHF Champions League, where Aalborg lost to FC Barcelona. In 2025 he won the Danish Cup with Aalborg Håndbold. Later the same season he won the Danish championship, winning his first double.

In 2025 he joined German top club SC Magdeburg on a 1-year contract.

=== Seasonal stats ===
Season	Team	League	Games	Goals	Penalty goals	Outfield goals
2009/10	Haslum HK	Eliteserien	11	3	0	3
2010/11	Haslum HK	Eliteserien	21	68	0	68
2011/12	Haslum HK	Eliteserien	31	97	2	96
2012/13	Haslum HK	Eliteserien	28	93	1	92
2013/14	Haslum HK	Eliteserien	21	60	1	59
2014/15	Haslum HK	Eliteserien	26	46	0	46
2015/16	Haslum HK	Eliteserien	28	73	6	67
2016/17	Haslum HK	Eliteserien	23	109	20	89
2017/18	Aalborg HB	Håndboldligaen	28	54	23	31
2018/19	Aalborg HB	Håndboldligaen	34	175	52	123
2019/20	Aalborg HB	Håndboldligaen	23	81	23	58
2020/21	Aalborg HB	Håndboldligaen	33	132	38	94
2021/22	Aalborg HB	Håndboldligaen	30	93	27	66
2022/23	Aalborg HB	Håndboldligaen	34	131	19	112
2023/24	Aalborg HB	Håndboldligaen	22	47	0	47
2024/25	Aalborg HB	Håndboldligaen	33	92	1	91
2009–2017	Eliteserien^{1}		189	549	30	519
2017–2025	Håndboldligaen^{1}		237	805	183	622
2009–2025	Career Total		426	1354	213	1141

^{1}Including Championship playoffs

=== National team ===
Barthold made his debut for the Norwegian national team on 3 April 2012 against Iceland. He represented Norway at the 2022 European Men's Handball Championship. During the tournament he scored 42 goals, when Norway reached 5th place.

At the 2025 World Championship he got a 10th place finish with Norway, scoring 13 goals in 6 games.

== Titles ==
- Norwegian Championship
  - Winner: 2010, 2011, 2016
- Danish Cup
  - Winner: 2018, 2025
- Danish Championship
  - Winner: 2019, 2020, 2021, 2024, 2025

== Personal life ==
Barthold is in a relationship with former international handballer Line Bjørnsen, making him a brother-in-law to team mate on the national team, Kristian Bjørnsen. They have 3 children.
