= Gøran Johannessen =

Norwegian handball player (born 1994)

Gøran Søgard Johannessen
Personal information
- Full name: Gøran Søgard Johannessen
- Nationality: Norwegian
- Born: 26 April 1994 (age 32) Stavanger, Norway
- Height: 1.93 m (6 ft 4 in)

Sport
- Sport: Handball
- Position: Centre back
- Current club: Kolstad Håndball
- Number: 23

Senior clubs
- Years: Team
- 2010–2016: Viking HK
- 2016–2018: GOG Håndbold
- 2018–2023: SG Flensburg-Handewitt
- 2023–: Kolstad Håndball
National team
Years	Team	Apps	(Gls)
2015–2024	Norway	109	(260)
Medal record
World Championship
Silver medal – second place	2017 France
Silver medal – second place	2019 Germany/Denmark
European Championship
Bronze medal – third place	2020 Sweden/Austria/Norway

Gøran Søgard Johannessen (born 26 April 1994) is a Norwegian handball player for Kolstad Håndball and the Norwegian national team.

He participated at the 2019 World Men's Handball Championship.

== Achievements ==
- World Championship:
  - Silver: 2017, 2019
- European Championship:
  - Bronze: 2020
