= Rui Silva (handballer) =

Portuguese handball player (born 1993)

Personal information
- Full name: Rui Sousa Martins Silva
- Nationality: Portuguese
- Born: 28 April 1993 (age 33) Guimarães, Portugal
- Height: 1.86 m (6 ft 1 in)

Sport
- Sport: Handball
- Position: Centre back
- Current club: FC Porto
- Number: 14

Youth career
- Years: Team
- 2004–2009: Xico Andebol

Senior clubs
- Years: Team
- 2008–2010: Xico Andebol
- 2010–2015: Sporting CP
- 2015–: FC Porto
National team
Years	Team	Apps	(Gls)
–	Portugal	150	(269)
- Updated on 14 January 2026

Rui Sousa Martins Silva (pronounced [ˈʁuj ˈsilvɐ]; born 28 April 1993) is a Portuguese handballer for FC Porto and the Portuguese national team.

He represented Portugal at the 2020 European Men's Handball Championship and the 2021 World Men's Handball Championship. In 2025 he was part of the Portugal team that reached the semifinals of the World Championship for the first time in history. They lost the semifinals to Denmark and the third place playoff to France. At the 2026 European Men's Handball Championship he was part of the Portugal team that got 5th place, their best ever finish at a European Championship.

== Honours ==
Xico Andebol

- Portuguese Cup: 2009–10

Sporting CP

- Portuguese Cup: 2011–12, 2012–13, 2013–14
- Portuguese Super Cup: 2013

Porto

- Portuguese League: 2018–19, 2020–21
- Portuguese Cup: 2018–19, 2020–21
- Portuguese Super Cup: 2019, 2021
