= Rok Ovniček =

Slovenian handball player (born 1995)

Personal information
- Nationality: Slovenian
- Born: 29 January 1995 (age 31) Slovenj Gradec, Slovenia
- Height: 1.84 m (6 ft 0 in)

Sport
- Sport: Handball
- Position: Centre back
- Current club: HBC Nantes
- Number: 10

Senior clubs
- Years: Team
- 2012–2018: RK Gorenje Velenje
- 2018–2019: RK Celje
- 2019–: HBC Nantes
National team
Years	Team	Apps	(Gls)
2019–	Slovenia	60	(77)
- Updated on 26 January 2025

Rok Ovniček (born 29 January 1995) is a Slovenian handball player who plays for HBC Nantes and the Slovenia national team.

He represented Slovenia at the 2020 European Men's Handball Championship.
