= Marko Panić =

Bosnian handball player

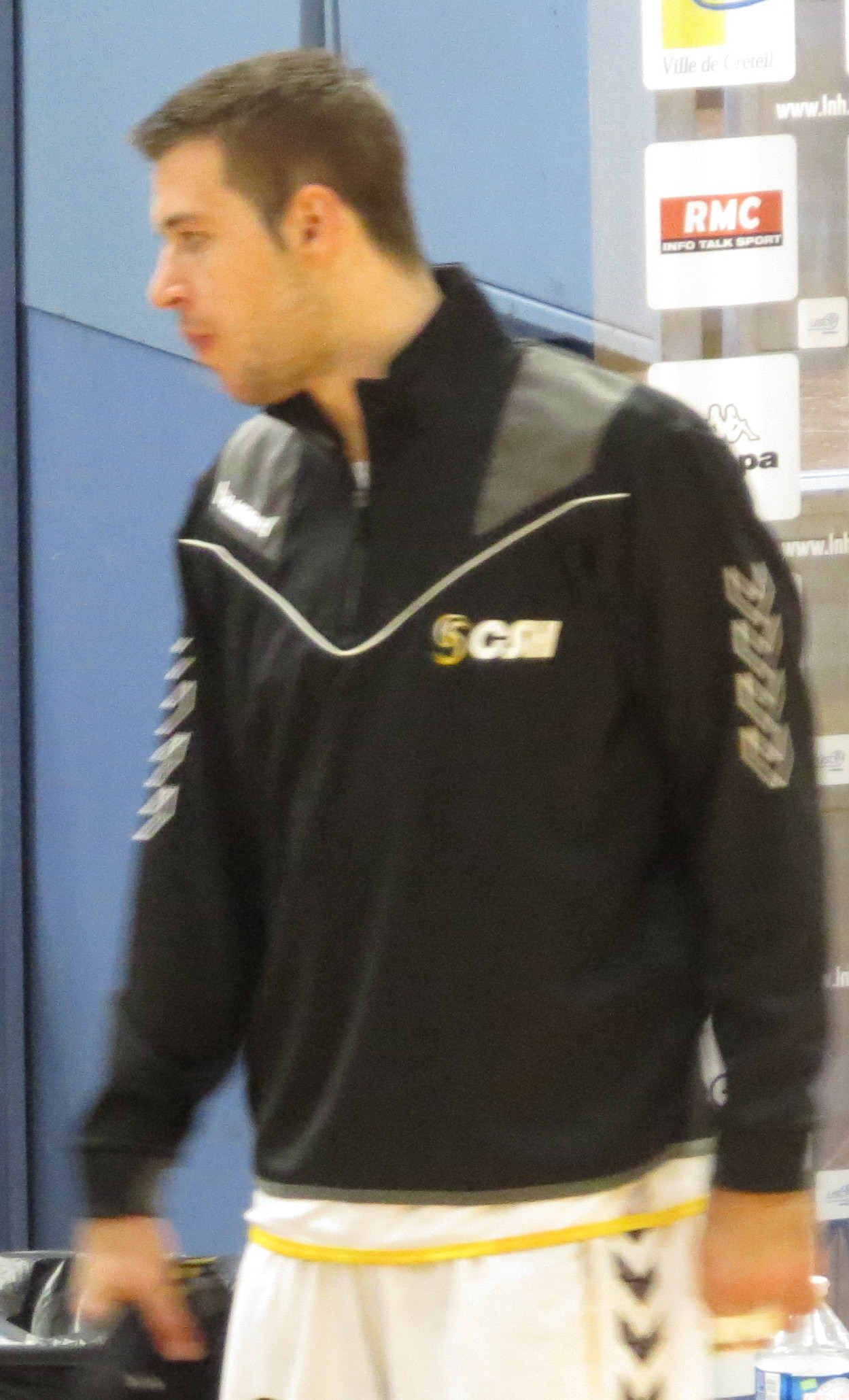

Personal information
- Born: 10 March 1991 (age 35) Jajce, SR Bosnia and Herzegovina, SFR Yugoslavia
- Height: 1.97 m (6 ft 6 in)

Sport
- Sport: Handball
- Position: Right back
- Current club: Montpellier Handball
- Number: 18

Senior clubs
- Years: Team
- 2006–2012: RK Borac m:tel
- 2012–2017: Chambéry SMB HB
- 2017–2019: KS Azoty-Puławy
- 2019–2021: HC Meshkov Brest
- 2021–2024: Montpellier Handball
- 2024–: Wisła Płock
National team
Years	Team	Apps	(Gls)
2010–	Bosnia and Herzegovina	71	(190)

Marko Panić (born 10 March 1991) is a Bosnian handball player for Montpellier Handball and the Bosnian national team. He is ambidextrous.

He represented Bosnia and Herzegovina at the 2020 European Men's Handball Championship.
