= Valero Rivera Folch =

Spanish handball player (born 1985)

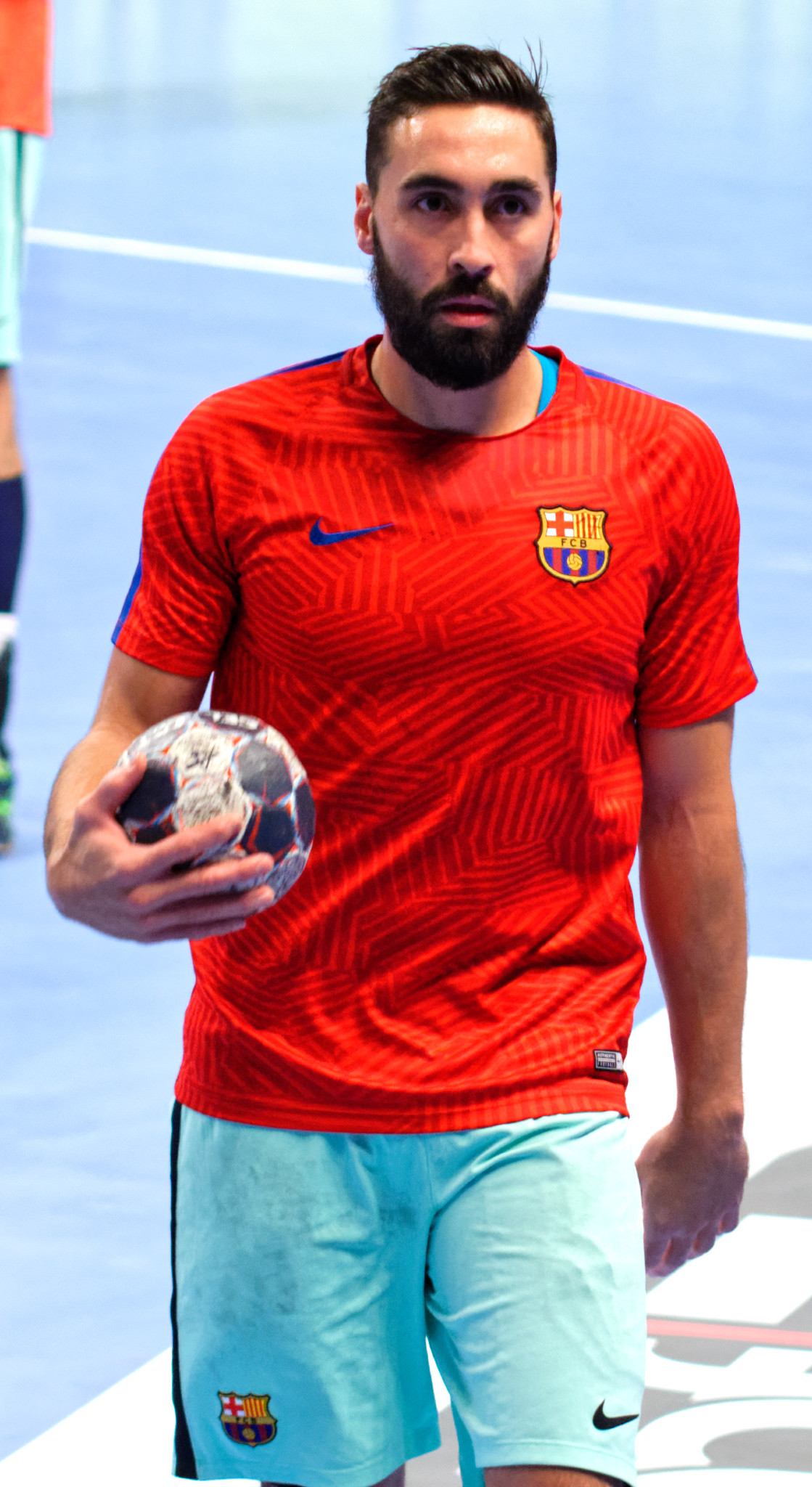
- Rivera in 2016

Personal information
- Nationality: Spanish
- Born: 22 February 1985 (age 41) Barcelona, Spain
- Height: 1.89 m (6 ft 2 in)

Sport
- Sport: Handball
- Position: Left wing
- Current club: HBC Nantes
- Number: 7

Youth career
- Years: Team
- –: FC Barcelona

Senior clubs
- Years: Team
- 2001–2005: FC Barcelona
- 2005–2007: BM Aragón
- 2007–2008: Algeciras BM
- 2008–2009: AD Ciudad de Guadalajara
- 2009–2010: SD Octavio Vigo
- 2010–2016: HBC Nantes
- 2016–2018: FC Barcelona Lassa
- 2018–: HBC Nantes
National team
Years	Team	Apps	(Gls)
–	Spain	91	(364)
Medal record
World Championship
Gold medal – first place	2013 Spain
European Championship
Gold medal – first place	2018 Croatia
Silver medal – second place	2016 Poland
Bronze medal – third place	2014 Denmark

Valero Rivera Folch (born 22 February 1985) is a Spanish handball player who plays for HBC Nantes and the Spain national team. His father is the former handballer Valero Rivera López. He is a World champion with Spain from 2013 and a European champion from 2018

== Career ==
The left wing started playing handball at FC Barcelona, where his father was a coach. In 2001 he joined the first team. Here he won the 2003 Liga ASOBAL, the 2003–04 EHF Cup and the 2004-05 EHF Champions League.

In 2010 he joined French team HBC Nantes. In the 2011-12 season and 2012-13 season he was the second best goalscorer in the French league. In the 2011-12 season he was also chosen as the best player in the French league.

In 2016 he returned to FC Barcalona. Here he won the 2017 and 2018 Spanish championship and cup. In 2018 he once again joined Nantes. Here he won the 2021 Coupe de la Ligue, the 2022 Trophée des Champions and the 2024 Coupe de France.

== National team ==
Valero Rivera Folch debuted for the Spanish national team on 3 November 2011 against Sweden.

For the 2012 Olympics he was in the Spanish preliminary squad, but did not make the final team.

In 2013 he won the 2013 World Championship at home with his father, Valero Rivera López, as the coach.

At the 2014 European Championship in Denmark he won bronze medals with the Spanish team. In 2018 he was on the Spanish team that won the 2018 European Championship.

== Individual awards ==
- All-Star Left Wing of EHF Champions League: 2021
- EHF Champions League topscorer : 2021
- Best player in the French Handball League 2011-12
