= 2024–25 EHF Champions League group stage =

The 2024–25 EHF Champions League group stage was played between 11 September 2024 and 6 March 2025 to determine the twelve teams advancing to the knockout stage of the 2024–25 EHF Champions League.

== Draw ==
The draw was held on 27 June 2024 in Vienna, Austria.

=== Seeding ===
The composition of the seeding pots for the group stage draw was announced on 26 June 2024. From Pot 1, three teams were drawn into Group A and the other three teams in Group B. From Pot 2, each team from the same national association (Germany, Poland, France, Denmark and Hungary) were drawn in opposite groups. Groups A and B were completed by either two or three teams from Pot 3.

Pot 1	Pot 2	Pot 3
(Spain) Barça (Germany) SC Magdeburg (Poland) Orlen Wisła Płock (Denmark) Aalborg Håndbold (Hungary) One Veszprém (France) Paris Saint-Germain	(Germany) Füchse Berlin (Poland) Industria Kielce (Denmark) Fredericia HK (Hungary) OTP Bank – Pick Szeged (France) HBC Nantes	(Romania) CS Dinamo București (Croatia) RK Zagreb (Portugal) Sporting CP (Norway) Kolstad Håndball (North Macedonia) RK Eurofarm Pelister

== Format ==
In each group, teams played against each other in a double round-robin format, with home and away matches.

== Tiebreakers ==
In the group stage, teams were ranked according to points (2 points for a win, 1 point for a draw, 0 points for a loss). After completion of the group stage, if two or more teams had the same number of points, the ranking was determined as follows:

1. Highest number of points in matches between the teams directly involved;
2. Superior goal difference in matches between the teams directly involved;
3. Highest number of goals scored in matches between the teams directly involved;
4. Superior goal difference in all matches of the group;
5. Highest number of plus goals in all matches of the group;

If the ranking of one of these teams was determined, the above criteria was consecutively followed until the ranking of all teams is determined. If no ranking could be determined, a decision would be obtained by EHF through drawing of lots.

== Groups ==
The matchdays were 11–12 September, 17–18 September, 25–26 September, 9–10 October, 16–17 October, 23–24 October, 30–31 October, 20–21 November, 27–28 November, 4–5 December 2024, 12–13 February, 19–20 February, 26–27 February and 5–6 March 2025.

=== Group A ===
Pos	Team	Pld	W	D	L	GF	GA	GD	Pts	Qualification
1	(Hungary) One Veszprém	14	12	0	2	468	408	+60	24	Quarterfinals
2	(Portugal) Sporting CP	14	8	2	4	454	399	+55	18 (Note: Sporting 4 Pts, +10 GD; Berlin 4 Pts, 0 GD; Paris 4 Pts, −10 GD.)	Quarterfinals
3	(Germany) Füchse Berlin	14	9	0	5	469	440	+29	18	Playoffs
4	(France) Paris Saint-Germain	14	9	0	5	462	456	+6	18	Playoffs
5	(Romania) CS Dinamo București	14	6	0	8	426	439	−13	12	Playoffs
6	(Poland) Orlen Wisła Płock	14	5	1	8	370	366	+4	11	Playoffs
7	(North Macedonia) RK Eurofarm Pelister	14	3	2	9	346	406	−60	8	
8	(Denmark) Fredericia HK	14	1	1	12	395	476	−81	3	

Source: EHF
Rules for classification: Tiebreakers
Notes:

11 September 2024; 20:45	Paris Saint-Germain (France)	31–29	(North Macedonia) RK Eurofarm Pelister	Stade Pierre de Coubertin, Paris; Attendance: 1,350; Referees: Bíró, Kiss (HUN)
11 September 2024; 20:45	Syprzak 11	(18–13)	Kuzmanovski 8	Stade Pierre de Coubertin, Paris; Attendance: 1,350; Referees: Bíró, Kiss (HUN)
11 September 2024; 20:45	2× (suspension)	Report	4× (suspension)	Stade Pierre de Coubertin, Paris; Attendance: 1,350; Referees: Bíró, Kiss (HUN)

11 September 2024; 20:45	Sporting CP (Portugal)	34–29	(Poland) Orlen Wisła Płock	Pavilhão João Rocha, Lisbon; Attendance: 1,844; Referees: Hansen, Madsen (DEN)
11 September 2024; 20:45	M. Costa 10	(17–14)	Daszek 7	Pavilhão João Rocha, Lisbon; Attendance: 1,844; Referees: Hansen, Madsen (DEN)
11 September 2024; 20:45	6× (suspension)	Report	4× (suspension)	Pavilhão João Rocha, Lisbon; Attendance: 1,844; Referees: Hansen, Madsen (DEN)

12 September 2024; 18:45	CS Dinamo București (Romania)	37–28	(Denmark) Fredericia HK	Polyvalent Hall, Bucharest; Attendance: 4,100; Referees: Konjičanin, Konjičanin (BIH)
12 September 2024; 18:45	Þrastarson 6	(18–14)	Henneberg 8	Polyvalent Hall, Bucharest; Attendance: 4,100; Referees: Konjičanin, Konjičanin (BIH)
12 September 2024; 18:45	3× (suspension)	Report	1× (yellow card) 1× (suspension)	Polyvalent Hall, Bucharest; Attendance: 4,100; Referees: Konjičanin, Konjičanin (BIH)

12 September 2024; 20:45	Füchse Berlin (Germany)	31–32	(Hungary) Veszprém KC	Max-Schmeling-Halle, Berlin; Attendance: 7,019; Referees: Nikolov, Nachevski (MKD)
12 September 2024; 20:45	Gidsel 10	(16–16)	Remili 11	Max-Schmeling-Halle, Berlin; Attendance: 7,019; Referees: Nikolov, Nachevski (MKD)
12 September 2024; 20:45	1× (yellow card) 2× (suspension)	Report	2× (suspension)	Max-Schmeling-Halle, Berlin; Attendance: 7,019; Referees: Nikolov, Nachevski (MKD)

18 September 2024; 18:45	Orlen Wisła Płock (Poland)	26–28	(Romania) CS Dinamo București	Orlen Arena, Płock; Attendance: 3,900; Referees: Pavićević, Ražnatović (MNE)
18 September 2024; 18:45	Daszek 7	(11–12)	Kašpárek 5	Orlen Arena, Płock; Attendance: 3,900; Referees: Pavićević, Ražnatović (MNE)
18 September 2024; 18:45	2× (suspension)	Report	4× (suspension)	Orlen Arena, Płock; Attendance: 3,900; Referees: Pavićević, Ražnatović (MNE)

18 September 2024; 20:45	RK Eurofarm Pelister (North Macedonia)	22–30	(Germany) Füchse Berlin	Boro Čurlevski Sports Hall, Bitola; Attendance: 3,000; Referees: Kurtagic, Wetterwik (SWE)
18 September 2024; 20:45	Radivojević 5	(9–15)	Andersson, Gidsel 6	Boro Čurlevski Sports Hall, Bitola; Attendance: 3,000; Referees: Kurtagic, Wetterwik (SWE)
18 September 2024; 20:45	2× (suspension)	Report	2× (suspension)	Boro Čurlevski Sports Hall, Bitola; Attendance: 3,000; Referees: Kurtagic, Wetterwik (SWE)

19 September 2024; 18:45	Veszprém KC (Hungary)	41–28	(France) Paris Saint-Germain	Veszprém Aréna, Veszprém; Attendance: 5,024; Referees: Jørum, Kleven (NOR)
19 September 2024; 18:45	Vailupau 8	(18–15)	Solé, Syprzak 5	Veszprém Aréna, Veszprém; Attendance: 5,024; Referees: Jørum, Kleven (NOR)
19 September 2024; 18:45	2× (suspension)	Report	1× (suspension)	Veszprém Aréna, Veszprém; Attendance: 5,024; Referees: Jørum, Kleven (NOR)

19 September 2024; 18:45	Fredericia HK (Denmark)	19–37	(Portugal) Sporting CP	Arena Fyn, Odense; Attendance: 2,045; Referees: Marín, García (ESP)
19 September 2024; 18:45	Balstad 4	(8–17)	F. Costa 6	Arena Fyn, Odense; Attendance: 2,045; Referees: Marín, García (ESP)
19 September 2024; 18:45	1× (yellow card)	Report	1× (yellow card) 1× (suspension)	Arena Fyn, Odense; Attendance: 2,045; Referees: Marín, García (ESP)

25 September 2024; 20:45	Sporting CP (Portugal)	39–30	(Hungary) Veszprém KC	Pavilhão João Rocha, Lisbon; Attendance: 2,636; Referees: Brkic, Jusufhodzic (AUT)
25 September 2024; 20:45	F. Costa 7	(23–17)	Remili 7	Pavilhão João Rocha, Lisbon; Attendance: 2,636; Referees: Brkic, Jusufhodzic (AUT)
25 September 2024; 20:45	1× (yellow card) 4× (suspension)	Report	1× (yellow card) 2× (suspension)	Pavilhão João Rocha, Lisbon; Attendance: 2,636; Referees: Brkic, Jusufhodzic (AUT)

26 September 2024; 18:45	Fredericia HK (Denmark)	32–38	(Germany) Füchse Berlin	Arena Fyn, Odense; Attendance: 3,145; Referees: Horváth, Marton (HUN)
26 September 2024; 18:45	Pevnov 6	(17–17)	Andersson 8	Arena Fyn, Odense; Attendance: 3,145; Referees: Horváth, Marton (HUN)
26 September 2024; 18:45	3× (suspension)	Report	4× (suspension)	Arena Fyn, Odense; Attendance: 3,145; Referees: Horváth, Marton (HUN)

26 September 2024; 18:45	CS Dinamo București (Romania)	34–25	(North Macedonia) RK Eurofarm Pelister	Polyvalent Hall, Bucharest; Attendance: 4,300; Referees: Kull, Tint (EST)
26 September 2024; 18:45	Rosta 7	(19–13)	Kuzmanovski 9	Polyvalent Hall, Bucharest; Attendance: 4,300; Referees: Kull, Tint (EST)
26 September 2024; 18:45	3× (suspension)	Report	2× (yellow card) 4× (suspension) 1× (red card)	Polyvalent Hall, Bucharest; Attendance: 4,300; Referees: Kull, Tint (EST)

26 September 2024; 20:45	Orlen Wisła Płock (Poland)	23–24	(France) Paris Saint-Germain	Orlen Arena, Płock; Attendance: 5,247; Referees: Elíasson, Pálsson (ISL)
26 September 2024; 20:45	Daszek 8	(13–13)	Syprzak 7	Orlen Arena, Płock; Attendance: 5,247; Referees: Elíasson, Pálsson (ISL)
26 September 2024; 20:45	2× (yellow card) 4× (suspension)	Report	1× (yellow card) 5× (suspension)	Orlen Arena, Płock; Attendance: 5,247; Referees: Elíasson, Pálsson (ISL)

9 October 2024; 20:45	Paris Saint-Germain (France)	38–30	(Denmark) Fredericia HK	Stade Pierre de Coubertin, Paris; Attendance: 2,627; Referees: Pavićević, Ražnatović (MNE)
9 October 2024; 20:45	Prandi 9	(18–15)	Bisgaard 7	Stade Pierre de Coubertin, Paris; Attendance: 2,627; Referees: Pavićević, Ražnatović (MNE)
9 October 2024; 20:45	1× (suspension)	Report	1× (suspension)	Stade Pierre de Coubertin, Paris; Attendance: 2,627; Referees: Pavićević, Ražnatović (MNE)

9 October 2024; 20:45	RK Eurofarm Pelister (North Macedonia)	24–24	(Portugal) Sporting CP	Boro Čurlevski Sports Hall, Bitola; Attendance: 3,000; Referees: Horváth, Marton (HUN)
9 October 2024; 20:45	three players 5	(15–13)	Aregay, Salvador 5	Boro Čurlevski Sports Hall, Bitola; Attendance: 3,000; Referees: Horváth, Marton (HUN)
9 October 2024; 20:45	1× (yellow card) 3× (suspension)	Report	1× (suspension)	Boro Čurlevski Sports Hall, Bitola; Attendance: 3,000; Referees: Horváth, Marton (HUN)

10 October 2024; 18:45	Veszprém KC (Hungary)	36–24	(Romania) CS Dinamo București	Veszprém Aréna, Veszprém; Attendance: 4,800; Referees: Kurtagic, Wetterwik (SWE)
10 October 2024; 18:45	Remili 6	(19–11)	Langaro 6	Veszprém Aréna, Veszprém; Attendance: 4,800; Referees: Kurtagic, Wetterwik (SWE)
10 October 2024; 18:45	3× (suspension)	Report	2× (suspension) 1× (red card)	Veszprém Aréna, Veszprém; Attendance: 4,800; Referees: Kurtagic, Wetterwik (SWE)

10 October 2024; 18:45	Füchse Berlin (Germany)	25–24	(Poland) Orlen Wisła Płock	Max-Schmeling-Halle, Berlin; Attendance: 5,696; Referees: Gasmi, Gasmi (FRA)
10 October 2024; 18:45	Gidsel, Marsenić 6	(12–12)	Cokan 5	Max-Schmeling-Halle, Berlin; Attendance: 5,696; Referees: Gasmi, Gasmi (FRA)
10 October 2024; 18:45	1× (yellow card) 4× (suspension)	Report	1× (yellow card) 5× (suspension) 1× (red card)	Max-Schmeling-Halle, Berlin; Attendance: 5,696; Referees: Gasmi, Gasmi (FRA)

17 October 2024; 18:45	Veszprém KC (Hungary)	34–32	(Denmark) Fredericia HK	Veszprém Aréna, Veszprém; Attendance: 4,496; Referees: Merz, Kuttler (GER)
17 October 2024; 18:45	Remili 9	(16–12)	Bisgaard 7	Veszprém Aréna, Veszprém; Attendance: 4,496; Referees: Merz, Kuttler (GER)
17 October 2024; 18:45	1× (suspension)	Report	2× (yellow card) 4× (suspension) 1× (red card)	Veszprém Aréna, Veszprém; Attendance: 4,496; Referees: Merz, Kuttler (GER)

17 October 2024; 20:45	Orlen Wisła Płock (Poland)	26–18	(North Macedonia) RK Eurofarm Pelister	Orlen Arena, Płock; Attendance: 3,961; Referees: Konjičanin, Konjičanin (BIH)
17 October 2024; 20:45	Mihić 8	(13–11)	Kuzmanovski 5	Orlen Arena, Płock; Attendance: 3,961; Referees: Konjičanin, Konjičanin (BIH)
17 October 2024; 20:45	2× (suspension)	Report	6× (suspension)	Orlen Arena, Płock; Attendance: 3,961; Referees: Konjičanin, Konjičanin (BIH)

17 October 2024; 20:45	Paris Saint-Germain (France)	35–32	(Romania) CS Dinamo București	Stade Pierre de Coubertin, Paris; Attendance: 1,856; Referees: Lah, Sok (SLO)
17 October 2024; 20:45	Prandi 9	(16–19)	Þrastarson, Zein 5	Stade Pierre de Coubertin, Paris; Attendance: 1,856; Referees: Lah, Sok (SLO)
17 October 2024; 20:45	2× (suspension)	Report	1× (yellow card) 5× (suspension)	Stade Pierre de Coubertin, Paris; Attendance: 1,856; Referees: Lah, Sok (SLO)

17 October 2024; 20:45	Sporting CP (Portugal)	35–33	(Germany) Füchse Berlin	Pavilhão João Rocha, Lisbon; Attendance: 2,856; Referees: Elíasson, Pálsson (ISL)
17 October 2024; 20:45	M. Costa, Þorkelsson 8	(21–19)	three players 7	Pavilhão João Rocha, Lisbon; Attendance: 2,856; Referees: Elíasson, Pálsson (ISL)
17 October 2024; 20:45	6× (suspension)	Report	1× (yellow card) 2× (suspension) 1× (red card)	Pavilhão João Rocha, Lisbon; Attendance: 2,856; Referees: Elíasson, Pálsson (ISL)

23 October 2024; 18:45	Fredericia HK (Denmark)	28–25	(Poland) Orlen Wisła Płock	Arena Fyn, Odense; Attendance: 1,764; Referees: Boričić, Marković (SRB)
23 October 2024; 18:45	Moberg 9	(13–11)	Fazekas, Zarabec 5	Arena Fyn, Odense; Attendance: 1,764; Referees: Boričić, Marković (SRB)
23 October 2024; 18:45	1× (yellow card) 7× (suspension) 1× (red card)	Report	2× (yellow card) 4× (suspension)	Arena Fyn, Odense; Attendance: 1,764; Referees: Boričić, Marković (SRB)

23 October 2024; 18:45	CS Dinamo București (Romania)	33–29	(Portugal) Sporting CP	Polyvalent Hall, Bucharest; Attendance: 4,100; Referees: Jørum, Kleven (NOR)
23 October 2024; 18:45	three players 6	(13–15)	Þorkelsson 6	Polyvalent Hall, Bucharest; Attendance: 4,100; Referees: Jørum, Kleven (NOR)
23 October 2024; 18:45	1× (yellow card) 2× (suspension)	Report	1× (yellow card) 2× (suspension)	Polyvalent Hall, Bucharest; Attendance: 4,100; Referees: Jørum, Kleven (NOR)

24 October 2024; 18:45	Füchse Berlin (Germany)	38–40	(France) Paris Saint-Germain	Max-Schmeling-Halle, Berlin; Attendance: 8,525; Referees: Marín, García (ESP)
24 October 2024; 18:45	Gidsel 10	(20–20)	Prandi 9	Max-Schmeling-Halle, Berlin; Attendance: 8,525; Referees: Marín, García (ESP)
24 October 2024; 18:45	5× (suspension)	Report	3× (suspension) 1× (red card)	Max-Schmeling-Halle, Berlin; Attendance: 8,525; Referees: Marín, García (ESP)

24 October 2024; 20:45	RK Eurofarm Pelister (North Macedonia)	23–30	(Hungary) Veszprém KC	Boro Čurlevski Sports Hall, Bitola; Attendance: 2,850; Referees: Sekulić, Jovandić (SRB)
24 October 2024; 20:45	Kuzmanovski 7	(12–17)	Cindrić 8	Boro Čurlevski Sports Hall, Bitola; Attendance: 2,850; Referees: Sekulić, Jovandić (SRB)
24 October 2024; 20:45	3× (suspension)	Report	2× (suspension) 1× (red card)	Boro Čurlevski Sports Hall, Bitola; Attendance: 2,850; Referees: Sekulić, Jovandić (SRB)

30 October 2024; 20:45	Orlen Wisła Płock (Poland)	24–27	(Hungary) Veszprém KC	Orlen Arena, Płock; Attendance: 4,783; Referees: Horáček, Novotný (CZE)
30 October 2024; 20:45	Zarabec 10	(10–12)	Elísson 7	Orlen Arena, Płock; Attendance: 4,783; Referees: Horáček, Novotný (CZE)
30 October 2024; 20:45	1× (suspension)	Report	2× (suspension) 1× (red card)	Orlen Arena, Płock; Attendance: 4,783; Referees: Horáček, Novotný (CZE)

30 October 2024; 20:45	Paris Saint-Germain (France)	30–28	(Portugal) Sporting CP	Stade Pierre de Coubertin, Paris; Attendance: 3,180; Referees: Kurtagic, Wetterwik (SWE)
30 October 2024; 20:45	three players 6	(16–14)	Aregay 6	Stade Pierre de Coubertin, Paris; Attendance: 3,180; Referees: Kurtagic, Wetterwik (SWE)
30 October 2024; 20:45	1× (suspension)	Report	3× (suspension)	Stade Pierre de Coubertin, Paris; Attendance: 3,180; Referees: Kurtagic, Wetterwik (SWE)

31 October 2024; 18:45	Fredericia HK (Denmark)	23–25	(North Macedonia) RK Eurofarm Pelister	Arena Fyn, Odense; Attendance: 1,780; Referees: Schulze, Tönnies (GER)
31 October 2024; 18:45	Andersen 4	(12–9)	Kuzmanovski 5	Arena Fyn, Odense; Attendance: 1,780; Referees: Schulze, Tönnies (GER)
31 October 2024; 18:45	2× (yellow card) 2× (suspension)	Report	1× (yellow card) 4× (suspension) 1× (red card)	Arena Fyn, Odense; Attendance: 1,780; Referees: Schulze, Tönnies (GER)

31 October 2024; 18:45	CS Dinamo București (Romania)	38–31	(Germany) Füchse Berlin	Polyvalent Hall, Bucharest; Attendance: 4,400; Referees: Hansen, Madsen (DEN)
31 October 2024; 18:45	Langaro, Lumbroso 5	(18–19)	Andersson 8	Polyvalent Hall, Bucharest; Attendance: 4,400; Referees: Hansen, Madsen (DEN)
31 October 2024; 18:45	1× (suspension)	Report	1× (yellow card) 1× (suspension)	Polyvalent Hall, Bucharest; Attendance: 4,400; Referees: Hansen, Madsen (DEN)

20 November 2024; 20:45	Sporting CP (Portugal)	39–28	(France) Paris Saint-Germain	Pavilhão João Rocha, Lisbon; Attendance: 2,683; Referees: Mitrevski, Todorovski (MKD)
20 November 2024; 20:45	M. Costa 9	(16–15)	Holm 6	Pavilhão João Rocha, Lisbon; Attendance: 2,683; Referees: Mitrevski, Todorovski (MKD)
20 November 2024; 20:45	1× (yellow card) 3× (suspension)	Report	1× (yellow card) 2× (suspension)	Pavilhão João Rocha, Lisbon; Attendance: 2,683; Referees: Mitrevski, Todorovski (MKD)

20 November 2024; 20:45	RK Eurofarm Pelister (North Macedonia)	29–29	(Denmark) Fredericia HK	Boro Čurlevski Sports Hall, Bitola; Attendance: 3,000; Referees: Lah, Sok (SLO)
20 November 2024; 20:45	Radivojević 7	(13–16)	Martinusen 7	Boro Čurlevski Sports Hall, Bitola; Attendance: 3,000; Referees: Lah, Sok (SLO)
20 November 2024; 20:45	1× (yellow card) 2× (suspension)	Report	2× (yellow card) 4× (suspension) 1× (red card)	Boro Čurlevski Sports Hall, Bitola; Attendance: 3,000; Referees: Lah, Sok (SLO)

21 November 2024; 18:45	Veszprém KC (Hungary)	30–26	(Poland) Orlen Wisła Płock	Veszprém Aréna, Veszprém; Attendance: 4,500; Referees: Marín, García (ESP)
21 November 2024; 18:45	Pálmarsson, Remili 6	(17–13)	Zarabec 7	Veszprém Aréna, Veszprém; Attendance: 4,500; Referees: Marín, García (ESP)
21 November 2024; 18:45	3× (suspension)	Report	3× (suspension)	Veszprém Aréna, Veszprém; Attendance: 4,500; Referees: Marín, García (ESP)

21 November 2024; 18:45	Füchse Berlin (Germany)	38–29	(Romania) CS Dinamo București	Max-Schmeling-Halle, Berlin; Attendance: 6,444; Referees: Martins, Martins (POR)
21 November 2024; 18:45	Gidsel 7	(22–14)	three players 6	Max-Schmeling-Halle, Berlin; Attendance: 6,444; Referees: Martins, Martins (POR)
21 November 2024; 18:45	1× (yellow card)	Report	1× (yellow card) 3× (suspension)	Max-Schmeling-Halle, Berlin; Attendance: 6,444; Referees: Martins, Martins (POR)

28 November 2024; 18:45	Orlen Wisła Płock (Poland)	30–21	(Denmark) Fredericia HK	Orlen Arena, Płock; Attendance: 4,100; Referees: Bíró, Kiss (HUN)
28 November 2024; 18:45	Zarabec 8	(14–9)	Martinusen 4	Orlen Arena, Płock; Attendance: 4,100; Referees: Bíró, Kiss (HUN)
28 November 2024; 18:45	1× (suspension)	Report	3× (suspension)	Orlen Arena, Płock; Attendance: 4,100; Referees: Bíró, Kiss (HUN)

28 November 2024; 18:45	Veszprém KC (Hungary)	33–26	(North Macedonia) RK Eurofarm Pelister	Veszprém Aréna, Veszprém; Attendance: 4,343; Referees: Bolic, Hurich (AUT)
28 November 2024; 18:45	Fabregas, Kosorotov 7	(20–11)	Kuzmanovski 6	Veszprém Aréna, Veszprém; Attendance: 4,343; Referees: Bolic, Hurich (AUT)
28 November 2024; 18:45	1× (yellow card) 2× (suspension)	Report	1× (suspension)	Veszprém Aréna, Veszprém; Attendance: 4,343; Referees: Bolic, Hurich (AUT)

28 November 2024; 20:45	Paris Saint-Germain (France)	34–37	(Germany) Füchse Berlin	Stade Pierre de Coubertin, Paris; Attendance: 3,201; Referees: Erdoğan, Özdeniz (TUR)
28 November 2024; 20:45	Syprzak 7	(18–19)	Andersson 13	Stade Pierre de Coubertin, Paris; Attendance: 3,201; Referees: Erdoğan, Özdeniz (TUR)
28 November 2024; 20:45	3× (suspension)	Report	2× (suspension)	Stade Pierre de Coubertin, Paris; Attendance: 3,201; Referees: Erdoğan, Özdeniz (TUR)

28 November 2024; 20:45	Sporting CP (Portugal)	34–25	(Romania) CS Dinamo București	Pavilhão João Rocha, Lisbon; Attendance: 2,297; Referees: Schulze, Tönnies (GER)
28 November 2024; 20:45	F. Costa, M. Costa 8	(20–11)	Gomes 6	Pavilhão João Rocha, Lisbon; Attendance: 2,297; Referees: Schulze, Tönnies (GER)
28 November 2024; 20:45	2× (suspension)	Report	7× (suspension)	Pavilhão João Rocha, Lisbon; Attendance: 2,297; Referees: Schulze, Tönnies (GER)

4 December 2024; 18:45	Fredericia HK (Denmark)	31–40	(Hungary) Veszprém KC	Arena Fyn, Odense; Attendance: 2,180; Referees: Budzák, Záhradník (SVK)
4 December 2024; 18:45	Taboada 7	(15–20)	Remili 10	Arena Fyn, Odense; Attendance: 2,180; Referees: Budzák, Záhradník (SVK)
4 December 2024; 18:45	1× (suspension)	Report	1× (suspension)	Arena Fyn, Odense; Attendance: 2,180; Referees: Budzák, Záhradník (SVK)

4 December 2024; 20:45	RK Eurofarm Pelister (North Macedonia)	21–18	(Poland) Orlen Wisła Płock	Boro Čurlevski Sports Hall, Bitola; Attendance: 3,000; Referees: Erdoğan, Özdeniz (TUR)
4 December 2024; 20:45	Kuzmanovski 7	(12–10)	Zarabec 6	Boro Čurlevski Sports Hall, Bitola; Attendance: 3,000; Referees: Erdoğan, Özdeniz (TUR)
4 December 2024; 20:45	1× (yellow card) 4× (suspension)	Report	2× (suspension)	Boro Čurlevski Sports Hall, Bitola; Attendance: 3,000; Referees: Erdoğan, Özdeniz (TUR)

5 December 2024; 18:45	CS Dinamo București (Romania)	33–40	(France) Paris Saint-Germain	Polyvalent Hall, Bucharest; Attendance: 5,000; Referees: Boričić, Marković (SRB)
5 December 2024; 18:45	Zein 7	(14–21)	Omar 8	Polyvalent Hall, Bucharest; Attendance: 5,000; Referees: Boričić, Marković (SRB)
5 December 2024; 18:45	1× (yellow card) 2× (suspension)	Report	1× (yellow card) 3× (suspension)	Polyvalent Hall, Bucharest; Attendance: 5,000; Referees: Boričić, Marković (SRB)

5 December 2024; 20:45	Füchse Berlin (Germany)	33–32	(Portugal) Sporting CP	Max-Schmeling-Halle, Berlin; Attendance: 5,925; Referees: Lah, Sok (SLO)
5 December 2024; 20:45	Freihöfer 10	(21–19)	F. Costa, M. Costa 7	Max-Schmeling-Halle, Berlin; Attendance: 5,925; Referees: Lah, Sok (SLO)
5 December 2024; 20:45	1× (yellow card) 4× (suspension) 1× (red card)	Report	2× (yellow card) 6× (suspension)	Max-Schmeling-Halle, Berlin; Attendance: 5,925; Referees: Lah, Sok (SLO)

13 February 2025; 18:45	Füchse Berlin (Germany)	36–29	(Denmark) Fredericia HK	Max-Schmeling-Halle, Berlin; Attendance: 6,306; Referees: Weijmans, Wolbertus (NED)
13 February 2025; 18:45	Andersson 12	(18–14)	Martinusen 7	Max-Schmeling-Halle, Berlin; Attendance: 6,306; Referees: Weijmans, Wolbertus (NED)
13 February 2025; 18:45	1× (yellow card) 1× (suspension)	Report	1× (yellow card) 5× (suspension)	Max-Schmeling-Halle, Berlin; Attendance: 6,306; Referees: Weijmans, Wolbertus (NED)

13 February 2025; 18:45	CS Dinamo București (Romania)	26–33	(Hungary) One Veszprém	Polyvalent Hall, Bucharest; Attendance: 3,500; Referees: Elíasson, Pálsson (ISL)
13 February 2025; 18:45	Vujović 5	(13–18)	Descat 9	Polyvalent Hall, Bucharest; Attendance: 3,500; Referees: Elíasson, Pálsson (ISL)
13 February 2025; 18:45	1× (yellow card) 2× (suspension)	Report	1× (yellow card) 2× (suspension)	Polyvalent Hall, Bucharest; Attendance: 3,500; Referees: Elíasson, Pálsson (ISL)

13 February 2025; 20:45	Paris Saint-Germain (France)	28–31	(Poland) Orlen Wisła Płock	Stade Pierre de Coubertin, Paris; Attendance: 2,943; Referees: Brkic, Jusufhodzic (AUT)
13 February 2025; 20:45	Steins, Solé 7	(15–14)	Piroch 10	Stade Pierre de Coubertin, Paris; Attendance: 2,943; Referees: Brkic, Jusufhodzic (AUT)
13 February 2025; 20:45	4× (suspension)	Report	1× (yellow card) 5× (suspension)	Stade Pierre de Coubertin, Paris; Attendance: 2,943; Referees: Brkic, Jusufhodzic (AUT)

13 February 2025; 20:45	Sporting CP (Portugal)	30–24	(North Macedonia) RK Eurofarm Pelister	Pavilhão João Rocha, Lisbon; Attendance: 2,018; Referees: Boričić, Marković (SRB)
13 February 2025; 20:45	Salvador 8	(14–13)	Kuzmanovski 6	Pavilhão João Rocha, Lisbon; Attendance: 2,018; Referees: Boričić, Marković (SRB)
13 February 2025; 20:45	1× (yellow card) 3× (suspension)	Report	5× (suspension)	Pavilhão João Rocha, Lisbon; Attendance: 2,018; Referees: Boričić, Marković (SRB)

19 February 2025; 18:45	Fredericia HK (Denmark)	32–38	(France) Paris Saint-Germain	Middelfart Sparekasse ARENA, Fredericia; Attendance: 2,350; Referees: Sekulić, Jovandić (SRB)
19 February 2025; 18:45	Bisgaard, Taboada 6	(17–16)	Syprzak 10	Middelfart Sparekasse ARENA, Fredericia; Attendance: 2,350; Referees: Sekulić, Jovandić (SRB)
19 February 2025; 18:45	1× (yellow card) 4× (suspension)	Report	4× (suspension)	Middelfart Sparekasse ARENA, Fredericia; Attendance: 2,350; Referees: Sekulić, Jovandić (SRB)

20 February 2025; 18:45	Orlen Wisła Płock (Poland)	32–27	(Germany) Füchse Berlin	Orlen Arena, Płock; Attendance: 4,801; Referees: Álvarez, Bustamante (ESP)
20 February 2025; 18:45	Piroch 10	(19–11)	Marsenić 5	Orlen Arena, Płock; Attendance: 4,801; Referees: Álvarez, Bustamante (ESP)
20 February 2025; 18:45	1× (yellow card) 3× (suspension)	Report	2× (suspension)	Orlen Arena, Płock; Attendance: 4,801; Referees: Álvarez, Bustamante (ESP)

20 February 2025; 18:45	One Veszprém (Hungary)	33–32	(Portugal) Sporting CP	Veszprém Aréna, Veszprém; Attendance: 5,022; Referees: Hansen, Madsen (DEN)
20 February 2025; 18:45	Descat 8	(16–17)	M. Costa 8	Veszprém Aréna, Veszprém; Attendance: 5,022; Referees: Hansen, Madsen (DEN)
20 February 2025; 18:45	1× (yellow card) 6× (suspension)	Report	1× (yellow card) 4× (suspension)	Veszprém Aréna, Veszprém; Attendance: 5,022; Referees: Hansen, Madsen (DEN)

20 February 2025; 20:45	RK Eurofarm Pelister (North Macedonia)	25–24	(Romania) CS Dinamo București	Boro Čurlevski Sports Hall, Bitola; Attendance: 3,000; Referees: Marín, García (ESP)
20 February 2025; 20:45	Tajnik 6	(12–13)	Kašpárek 5	Boro Čurlevski Sports Hall, Bitola; Attendance: 3,000; Referees: Marín, García (ESP)
20 February 2025; 20:45	2× (suspension)	Report	5× (suspension) 1× (red card)	Boro Čurlevski Sports Hall, Bitola; Attendance: 3,000; Referees: Marín, García (ESP)

26 February 2025; 18:45	CS Dinamo București (Romania)	26–27	(Poland) Orlen Wisła Płock	Polyvalent Hall, Bucharest; Attendance: 3,000; Referees: Lah, Sok (SLO)
26 February 2025; 18:45	Akimenko 6	(14–14)	Krajewski 7	Polyvalent Hall, Bucharest; Attendance: 3,000; Referees: Lah, Sok (SLO)
26 February 2025; 18:45	1× (yellow card) 3× (suspension)	Report	5× (suspension)	Polyvalent Hall, Bucharest; Attendance: 3,000; Referees: Lah, Sok (SLO)

26 February 2025; 20:45	Sporting CP (Portugal)	32–29	(Denmark) Fredericia HK	Pavilhão João Rocha, Lisbon; Attendance: 2,006; Referees: Kull, Tint (EST)
26 February 2025; 20:45	M. Costa 7	(15–16)	Bisgaard 10	Pavilhão João Rocha, Lisbon; Attendance: 2,006; Referees: Kull, Tint (EST)
26 February 2025; 20:45	1× (yellow card) 3× (suspension)	Report	4× (suspension)	Pavilhão João Rocha, Lisbon; Attendance: 2,006; Referees: Kull, Tint (EST)

27 February 2025; 20:45	Paris Saint-Germain (France)	33–37	(Hungary) One Veszprém	Stade Pierre de Coubertin, Paris; Attendance: 3,283; Referees: Konjičanin, Konjičanin (BIH)
27 February 2025; 20:45	Syprzak 6	(18–23)	Marguč 6	Stade Pierre de Coubertin, Paris; Attendance: 3,283; Referees: Konjičanin, Konjičanin (BIH)
27 February 2025; 20:45	2× (suspension)	Report	3× (suspension)	Stade Pierre de Coubertin, Paris; Attendance: 3,283; Referees: Konjičanin, Konjičanin (BIH)

27 February 2025; 20:45	Füchse Berlin (Germany)	39–29	(North Macedonia) RK Eurofarm Pelister	Max-Schmeling-Halle, Berlin; Attendance: 5,925; Referees: Jørum, Kleven (NOR)
27 February 2025; 20:45	Gidsel, Langhoff 9	(15–12)	Kuzmanovski 7	Max-Schmeling-Halle, Berlin; Attendance: 5,925; Referees: Jørum, Kleven (NOR)
27 February 2025; 20:45	2× (suspension)	Report	1× (yellow card) 2× (suspension)	Max-Schmeling-Halle, Berlin; Attendance: 5,925; Referees: Jørum, Kleven (NOR)

6 March 2025; 18:45	One Veszprém (Hungary)	32–33	(Germany) Füchse Berlin	Veszprém Aréna, Veszprém; Attendance: 5,340; Referees: Boričić, Marković (SRB)
6 March 2025; 18:45	Marguč 5	(16–17)	Andersson 8	Veszprém Aréna, Veszprém; Attendance: 5,340; Referees: Boričić, Marković (SRB)
6 March 2025; 18:45	4× (suspension)	Report	7× (suspension)	Veszprém Aréna, Veszprém; Attendance: 5,340; Referees: Boričić, Marković (SRB)

6 March 2025; 18:45	Fredericia HK (Denmark)	32–37	(Romania) CS Dinamo București	Arena Fyn, Odense; Attendance: 1,980; Referees: Erdoğan, Özdeniz (TUR)
6 March 2025; 18:45	Martinusen 6	(14–16)	five players 5	Arena Fyn, Odense; Attendance: 1,980; Referees: Erdoğan, Özdeniz (TUR)
6 March 2025; 18:45		Report	3× (suspension)	Arena Fyn, Odense; Attendance: 1,980; Referees: Erdoğan, Özdeniz (TUR)

6 March 2025; 20:45	Orlen Wisła Płock (Poland)	29–29	(Portugal) Sporting CP	Orlen Arena, Płock; Attendance: 4,605; Referees: Elíasson, Pálsson (ISL)
6 March 2025; 20:45	Zarabec 9	(17–15)	M. Costa 10	Orlen Arena, Płock; Attendance: 4,605; Referees: Elíasson, Pálsson (ISL)
6 March 2025; 20:45	1× (yellow card) 2× (suspension)	Report	2× (yellow card) 2× (suspension) 1× (red card)	Orlen Arena, Płock; Attendance: 4,605; Referees: Elíasson, Pálsson (ISL)

6 March 2025; 20:45	RK Eurofarm Pelister (North Macedonia)	26–35	(France) Paris Saint-Germain	Boro Čurlevski Sports Hall, Bitola; Attendance: 3,000; Referees: Horáček, Novotný (CZE)
6 March 2025; 20:45	Kuzmanovski 8	(13–18)	Prandi 8	Boro Čurlevski Sports Hall, Bitola; Attendance: 3,000; Referees: Horáček, Novotný (CZE)
6 March 2025; 20:45	3× (suspension)	Report	3× (suspension)	Boro Čurlevski Sports Hall, Bitola; Attendance: 3,000; Referees: Horáček, Novotný (CZE)

=== Group B ===
Pos	Team	Pld	W	D	L	GF	GA	GD	Pts	Qualification
1	(Spain) Barça	14	10	2	2	454	409	+45	22	Quarterfinals
2	(Denmark) Aalborg Håndbold	14	8	2	4	434	421	+13	18	Quarterfinals
3	(France) HBC Nantes	14	7	3	4	426	407	+19	17	Playoffs
4	(Germany) SC Magdeburg	14	6	1	7	404	389	+15	13 (Note: Magdeburg 2 Pts, +5 GD; Szeged 2 Pts, −5 GD.)	Playoffs
5	(Hungary) OTP Bank – Pick Szeged	14	6	1	7	421	422	−1	13	Playoffs
6	(Poland) Industria Kielce	14	5	1	8	389	411	−22	11 (Note: Kielce 4 Pts; Kolstad 0 Pts.)	Playoffs
7	(Norway) Kolstad Håndball	14	5	1	8	400	434	−34	11	
8	(Croatia) RK Zagreb	14	3	1	10	373	408	−35	7	

Source: EHF
Rules for classification: Tiebreakers
Notes:

11 September 2024; 18:45	Aalborg Håndbold (Denmark)	38–31	(France) HBC Nantes	Gigantium, Aalborg; Attendance: 5,133; Referees: Elíasson, Pálsson (ISL)
11 September 2024; 18:45	Arnoldsen 11	(16–17)	Rivera Folch 7	Gigantium, Aalborg; Attendance: 5,133; Referees: Elíasson, Pálsson (ISL)
11 September 2024; 18:45	1× (yellow card) 3× (suspension)	Report	1× (yellow card) 4× (suspension)	Gigantium, Aalborg; Attendance: 5,133; Referees: Elíasson, Pálsson (ISL)

11 September 2024; 18:45	Kolstad Håndball (Norway)	30–35	(Spain) Barça	Trondheim Spektrum, Trondheim; Attendance: 7,842; Referees: Boričić, Marković (SRB)
11 September 2024; 18:45	Johnsen, Søndenå 6	(13–20)	Mem 7	Trondheim Spektrum, Trondheim; Attendance: 7,842; Referees: Boričić, Marković (SRB)
11 September 2024; 18:45	1× (yellow card) 3× (suspension)	Report	1× (yellow card) 3× (suspension)	Trondheim Spektrum, Trondheim; Attendance: 7,842; Referees: Boričić, Marković (SRB)

12 September 2024; 18:45	OTP Bank – Pick Szeged (Hungary)	31–29	(Germany) SC Magdeburg	Pick Aréna, Szeged; Attendance: 5,306; Referees: Lah, Sok (SLO)
12 September 2024; 18:45	Šoštarić 7	(17–18)	Magnússon, Weber 5	Pick Aréna, Szeged; Attendance: 5,306; Referees: Lah, Sok (SLO)
12 September 2024; 18:45	1× (yellow card) 3× (suspension)	Report	1× (suspension)	Pick Aréna, Szeged; Attendance: 5,306; Referees: Lah, Sok (SLO)

12 September 2024; 20:45	Industria Kielce (Poland)	30–23	(Croatia) RK Zagreb	Hala Legionów, Kielce; Attendance: 4,050; Referees: Gasmi, Gasmi (FRA)
12 September 2024; 20:45	Karačić 5	(13–13)	Klarica, Kos 5	Hala Legionów, Kielce; Attendance: 4,050; Referees: Gasmi, Gasmi (FRA)
12 September 2024; 20:45	2× (yellow card) 4× (suspension)	Report	4× (suspension)	Hala Legionów, Kielce; Attendance: 4,050; Referees: Gasmi, Gasmi (FRA)

18 September 2024; 18:45	RK Zagreb (Croatia)	31–23	(Denmark) Aalborg Håndbold	Arena Zagreb, Zagreb; Attendance: 5,390; Referees: Horáček, Novotný (CZE)
18 September 2024; 18:45	Klarica 7	(13–9)	Bjørnsen, Möller 5	Arena Zagreb, Zagreb; Attendance: 5,390; Referees: Horáček, Novotný (CZE)
18 September 2024; 18:45	3× (suspension)	Report	2× (suspension)	Arena Zagreb, Zagreb; Attendance: 5,390; Referees: Horáček, Novotný (CZE)

18 September 2024; 20:45	HBC Nantes (France)	23–20	(Poland) Industria Kielce	H Arena, Nantes; Attendance: 5,902; Referees: Covalciuc, Covalciuc (MDA)
18 September 2024; 20:45	Rivera Folch 8	(13–10)	Karačić 5	H Arena, Nantes; Attendance: 5,902; Referees: Covalciuc, Covalciuc (MDA)
18 September 2024; 20:45	4× (suspension)	Report	4× (suspension)	H Arena, Nantes; Attendance: 5,902; Referees: Covalciuc, Covalciuc (MDA)

19 September 2024; 20:45	SC Magdeburg (Germany)	33–25	(Norway) Kolstad Håndball	GETEC Arena, Magdeburg; Attendance: 5,337; Referees: Martins, Martins (POR)
19 September 2024; 20:45	Lagergren 8	(18–9)	Lyse, Óskarsson 5	GETEC Arena, Magdeburg; Attendance: 5,337; Referees: Martins, Martins (POR)
19 September 2024; 20:45	5× (suspension)	Report	2× (suspension)	GETEC Arena, Magdeburg; Attendance: 5,337; Referees: Martins, Martins (POR)

19 September 2024; 20:45	Barça (Spain)	31–30	(Hungary) OTP Bank – Pick Szeged	Palau Blaugrana, Barcelona; Attendance: 1,351; Referees: Merz, Kuttler (GER)
19 September 2024; 20:45	Gómez 5	(20–12)	Šoštarić 8	Palau Blaugrana, Barcelona; Attendance: 1,351; Referees: Merz, Kuttler (GER)
19 September 2024; 20:45	4× (suspension) 1× (red card)	Report	5× (suspension)	Palau Blaugrana, Barcelona; Attendance: 1,351; Referees: Merz, Kuttler (GER)

25 September 2024; 18:45	Aalborg Håndbold (Denmark)	33–33	(Germany) SC Magdeburg	Gigantium, Aalborg; Attendance: 5,500; Referees: Boričić, Marković (SRB)
25 September 2024; 18:45	Nilsson, Wiesmach 7	(17–13)	Kristjánsson 7	Gigantium, Aalborg; Attendance: 5,500; Referees: Boričić, Marković (SRB)
25 September 2024; 18:45	7× (suspension)	Report	1× (yellow card) 7× (suspension)	Gigantium, Aalborg; Attendance: 5,500; Referees: Boričić, Marković (SRB)

25 September 2024; 18:45	Kolstad Håndball (Norway)	29–25	(Croatia) RK Zagreb	Trondheim Spektrum, Trondheim; Attendance: 4,615; Referees: Bíró, Kiss (HUN)
25 September 2024; 18:45	Guðjónsson 11	(13–13)	Klarica 8	Trondheim Spektrum, Trondheim; Attendance: 4,615; Referees: Bíró, Kiss (HUN)
25 September 2024; 18:45	2× (suspension)	Report	3× (suspension)	Trondheim Spektrum, Trondheim; Attendance: 4,615; Referees: Bíró, Kiss (HUN)

25 September 2024; 20:45	Industria Kielce (Poland)	28–32	(Spain) Barça	Hala Legionów, Kielce; Attendance: 4,200; Referees: Lah, Sok (SLO)
25 September 2024; 20:45	Olejniczak 6	(13–17)	Richardson 8	Hala Legionów, Kielce; Attendance: 4,200; Referees: Lah, Sok (SLO)
25 September 2024; 20:45	1× (yellow card) 3× (suspension)	Report	2× (suspension)	Hala Legionów, Kielce; Attendance: 4,200; Referees: Lah, Sok (SLO)

26 September 2024; 18:45	OTP Bank – Pick Szeged (Hungary)	33–32	(France) HBC Nantes	Pick Aréna, Szeged; Attendance: 5,112; Referees: Martins, Martins (POR)
26 September 2024; 18:45	Šoštarić 7	(16–14)	Rivera Folch 9	Pick Aréna, Szeged; Attendance: 5,112; Referees: Martins, Martins (POR)
26 September 2024; 18:45	2× (suspension)	Report	7× (suspension)	Pick Aréna, Szeged; Attendance: 5,112; Referees: Martins, Martins (POR)

9 October 2024; 18:45	RK Zagreb (Croatia)	30–35	(Hungary) OTP Bank – Pick Szeged	Arena Zagreb, Zagreb; Attendance: 8,211; Referees: Hansen, Madsen (DEN)
9 October 2024; 18:45	Klarica 7	(12–19)	Šoštarič 10	Arena Zagreb, Zagreb; Attendance: 8,211; Referees: Hansen, Madsen (DEN)
9 October 2024; 18:45	3× (suspension)	Report		Arena Zagreb, Zagreb; Attendance: 8,211; Referees: Hansen, Madsen (DEN)

10 October 2024; 20:45	SC Magdeburg (Germany)	26–27	(Poland) Industria Kielce	GETEC Arena, Magdeburg; Attendance: 6,200; Referees: Marín, García (ESP)
10 October 2024; 20:45	Magnússon 7	(15–19)	D. Dujshebaev 7	GETEC Arena, Magdeburg; Attendance: 6,200; Referees: Marín, García (ESP)
10 October 2024; 20:45	1× (yellow card) 1× (suspension)	Report	1× (yellow card) 4× (suspension)	GETEC Arena, Magdeburg; Attendance: 6,200; Referees: Marín, García (ESP)

10 October 2024; 20:45	Barça (Spain)	35–27	(Denmark) Aalborg Håndbold	Palau Blaugrana, Barcelona; Attendance: 2,112; Referees: Mitrevski, Todorovski (MKD)
10 October 2024; 20:45	three players 5	(16–13)	Munk 8	Palau Blaugrana, Barcelona; Attendance: 2,112; Referees: Mitrevski, Todorovski (MKD)
10 October 2024; 20:45	4× (suspension)	Report	1× (yellow card) 2× (suspension)	Palau Blaugrana, Barcelona; Attendance: 2,112; Referees: Mitrevski, Todorovski (MKD)

10 October 2024; 20:45	HBC Nantes (France)	44–27	(Norway) Kolstad Håndball	H Arena, Nantes; Attendance: 5,902; Referees: Nikolov, Nachevski (MKD)
10 October 2024; 20:45	Minne, Odriozola 6	(26–11)	Aalberg 8	H Arena, Nantes; Attendance: 5,902; Referees: Nikolov, Nachevski (MKD)
10 October 2024; 20:45	1× (yellow card) 4× (suspension)	Report	4× (suspension)	H Arena, Nantes; Attendance: 5,902; Referees: Nikolov, Nachevski (MKD)

16 October 2024; 18:45	Aalborg Håndbold (Denmark)	29–28	(Hungary) OTP Bank – Pick Szeged	Gigantium, Aalborg; Attendance: 5,348; Referees: Kurtagic, Wetterwik (SWE)
16 October 2024; 18:45	Juul, Thurin 5	(16–15)	Bodó 6	Gigantium, Aalborg; Attendance: 5,348; Referees: Kurtagic, Wetterwik (SWE)
16 October 2024; 18:45		Report	2× (suspension)	Gigantium, Aalborg; Attendance: 5,348; Referees: Kurtagic, Wetterwik (SWE)

16 October 2024; 18:45	RK Zagreb (Croatia)	29–31	(Spain) Barça	Arena Zagreb, Zagreb; Attendance: 11,732; Referees: Erdoğan, Özdeniz (TUR)
16 October 2024; 18:45	Glavaš 9	(14–19)	Mem 6	Arena Zagreb, Zagreb; Attendance: 11,732; Referees: Erdoğan, Özdeniz (TUR)
16 October 2024; 18:45	1× (yellow card) 1× (suspension)	Report	2× (suspension)	Arena Zagreb, Zagreb; Attendance: 11,732; Referees: Erdoğan, Özdeniz (TUR)

16 October 2024; 20:45	SC Magdeburg (Germany)	28–32	(France) HBC Nantes	GETEC Arena, Magdeburg; Attendance: 5,301; Referees: Bíró, Kiss (HUN)
16 October 2024; 20:45	Magnússon 7	(16–15)	Minne 10	GETEC Arena, Magdeburg; Attendance: 5,301; Referees: Bíró, Kiss (HUN)
16 October 2024; 20:45	1× (yellow card)	Report	3× (suspension)	GETEC Arena, Magdeburg; Attendance: 5,301; Referees: Bíró, Kiss (HUN)

17 October 2024; 18:45	Kolstad Håndball (Norway)	32–33	(Poland) Industria Kielce	Trondheim Spektrum, Trondheim; Attendance: 4,852; Referees: Schulze, Tönnies (GER)
17 October 2024; 18:45	Jeppsson, Lyse 8	(17–17)	Moryto, Nahi 8	Trondheim Spektrum, Trondheim; Attendance: 4,852; Referees: Schulze, Tönnies (GER)
17 October 2024; 18:45	3× (suspension)	Report	2× (suspension)	Trondheim Spektrum, Trondheim; Attendance: 4,852; Referees: Schulze, Tönnies (GER)

23 October 2024; 20:45	Industria Kielce (Poland)	28–35	(Denmark) Aalborg Håndbold	Hala Legionów, Kielce; Attendance: 4,200; Referees: Martins, Martins (POR)
23 October 2024; 20:45	Maqueda, Moryto 5	(12–18)	Arnoldsen 9	Hala Legionów, Kielce; Attendance: 4,200; Referees: Martins, Martins (POR)
23 October 2024; 20:45	5× (suspension) 1× (red card)	Report	1× (yellow card) 2× (suspension)	Hala Legionów, Kielce; Attendance: 4,200; Referees: Martins, Martins (POR)

23 October 2024; 20:45	HBC Nantes (France)	32–29	(Croatia) RK Zagreb	H Arena, Nantes; Attendance: 5,902; Referees: Caçador, Nicolau (POR)
23 October 2024; 20:45	Bos 7	(15–15)	Pavlović 7	H Arena, Nantes; Attendance: 5,902; Referees: Caçador, Nicolau (POR)
23 October 2024; 20:45	1× (yellow card) 2× (suspension)	Report	5× (suspension) 1× (red card)	H Arena, Nantes; Attendance: 5,902; Referees: Caçador, Nicolau (POR)

24 October 2024; 18:45	OTP Bank – Pick Szeged (Hungary)	27–29	(Norway) Kolstad Håndball	Pick Aréna, Szeged; Attendance: 4,870; Referees: Pavićević, Ražnatović (MNE)
24 October 2024; 18:45	Šoštarič 9	(11–12)	Aalberg 7	Pick Aréna, Szeged; Attendance: 4,870; Referees: Pavićević, Ražnatović (MNE)
24 October 2024; 18:45	1× (yellow card) 1× (suspension)	Report	1× (suspension)	Pick Aréna, Szeged; Attendance: 4,870; Referees: Pavićević, Ražnatović (MNE)

24 October 2024; 20:45	Barça (Spain)	32–26	(Germany) SC Magdeburg	Palau Blaugrana, Barcelona; Attendance: 3,552; Referees: Gasmi, Gasmi (FRA)
24 October 2024; 20:45	Gómez 8	(16–11)	Zehnder 6	Palau Blaugrana, Barcelona; Attendance: 3,552; Referees: Gasmi, Gasmi (FRA)
24 October 2024; 20:45	1× (yellow card) 4× (suspension)	Report	4× (suspension)	Palau Blaugrana, Barcelona; Attendance: 3,552; Referees: Gasmi, Gasmi (FRA)

30 October 2024; 18:45	SC Magdeburg (Germany)	36–24	(Croatia) RK Zagreb	GETEC Arena, Magdeburg; Attendance: 6,479; Referees: Covalciuc, Covalciuc (MDA)
30 October 2024; 18:45	Persson 7	(16–12)	Glavaš 6	GETEC Arena, Magdeburg; Attendance: 6,479; Referees: Covalciuc, Covalciuc (MDA)
30 October 2024; 18:45	1× (yellow card) 3× (suspension)	Report	5× (suspension) 1× (red card)	GETEC Arena, Magdeburg; Attendance: 6,479; Referees: Covalciuc, Covalciuc (MDA)

30 October 2024; 18:45	OTP Bank – Pick Szeged (Hungary)	28–27	(Poland) Industria Kielce	Pick Aréna, Szeged; Attendance: 6,237; Referees: Nikolov, Nachevski (MKD)
30 October 2024; 18:45	three players 5	(15–13)	Nahi 7	Pick Aréna, Szeged; Attendance: 6,237; Referees: Nikolov, Nachevski (MKD)
30 October 2024; 18:45	2× (suspension)	Report	1× (yellow card) 3× (suspension)	Pick Aréna, Szeged; Attendance: 6,237; Referees: Nikolov, Nachevski (MKD)

30 October 2024; 18:45	Kolstad Håndball (Norway)	25–24	(Denmark) Aalborg Håndbold	Trondheim Spektrum, Trondheim; Attendance: 6,012; Referees: Lah, Sok (SLO)
30 October 2024; 18:45	Guðjónsson 5	(12–11)	Arnoldsen 7	Trondheim Spektrum, Trondheim; Attendance: 6,012; Referees: Lah, Sok (SLO)
30 October 2024; 18:45	3× (suspension)	Report	2× (suspension)	Trondheim Spektrum, Trondheim; Attendance: 6,012; Referees: Lah, Sok (SLO)

31 October 2024; 20:45	HBC Nantes (France)	31–31	(Spain) Barça	H Arena, Nantes; Attendance: 5,902; Referees: Konjičanin, Konjičanin (BIH)
31 October 2024; 20:45	Minne 7	(14–17)	Mem 9	H Arena, Nantes; Attendance: 5,902; Referees: Konjičanin, Konjičanin (BIH)
31 October 2024; 20:45	5× (suspension)	Report	2× (suspension)	H Arena, Nantes; Attendance: 5,902; Referees: Konjičanin, Konjičanin (BIH)

20 November 2024; 18:45	Aalborg Håndbold (Denmark)	30–28	(Norway) Kolstad Håndball	Gigantium, Aalborg; Attendance: 5,237; Referees: Caçador, Nicolau (POR)
20 November 2024; 18:45	Juul 7	(13–14)	Søndenå 8	Gigantium, Aalborg; Attendance: 5,237; Referees: Caçador, Nicolau (POR)
20 November 2024; 18:45	3× (suspension)	Report	3× (suspension)	Gigantium, Aalborg; Attendance: 5,237; Referees: Caçador, Nicolau (POR)

20 November 2024; 18:45	RK Zagreb (Croatia)	22–18	(Germany) SC Magdeburg	Arena Zagreb, Zagreb; Attendance: 6,107; Referees: Konjičanin, Konjičanin (BIH)
20 November 2024; 18:45	Klarica 7	(11–7)	three players 4	Arena Zagreb, Zagreb; Attendance: 6,107; Referees: Konjičanin, Konjičanin (BIH)
20 November 2024; 18:45	2× (yellow card) 5× (suspension) 2× (red card)	Report	4× (suspension)	Arena Zagreb, Zagreb; Attendance: 6,107; Referees: Konjičanin, Konjičanin (BIH)

21 November 2024; 20:45	Barça (Spain)	36–30	(France) HBC Nantes	Palau Blaugrana, Barcelona; Attendance: 2,268; Referees: Horváth, Marton (HUN)
21 November 2024; 20:45	N'Guessan 8	(19–14)	Bos 8	Palau Blaugrana, Barcelona; Attendance: 2,268; Referees: Horváth, Marton (HUN)
21 November 2024; 20:45	1× (yellow card) 4× (suspension)	Report	3× (suspension)	Palau Blaugrana, Barcelona; Attendance: 2,268; Referees: Horváth, Marton (HUN)

21 November 2024; 20:45	Industria Kielce (Poland)	31–35	(Hungary) OTP Bank – Pick Szeged	Hala Legionów, Kielce; Attendance: 4,200; Referees: Boričić, Marković (SRB)
21 November 2024; 20:45	Moryto 7	(19–17)	Šoštarić 6	Hala Legionów, Kielce; Attendance: 4,200; Referees: Boričić, Marković (SRB)
21 November 2024; 20:45	1× (yellow card) 5× (suspension)	Report	4× (suspension)	Hala Legionów, Kielce; Attendance: 4,200; Referees: Boričić, Marković (SRB)

27 November 2024; 18:45	Aalborg Håndbold (Denmark)	34–26	(Poland) Industria Kielce	Gigantium, Aalborg; Attendance: 5,455; Referees: Pavićević, Ražnatović (MNE)
27 November 2024; 18:45	Thurin, Vlah 6	(20–13)	five players 3	Gigantium, Aalborg; Attendance: 5,455; Referees: Pavićević, Ražnatović (MNE)
27 November 2024; 18:45	2× (suspension)	Report	4× (suspension)	Gigantium, Aalborg; Attendance: 5,455; Referees: Pavićević, Ražnatović (MNE)

27 November 2024; 18:45	Kolstad Håndball (Norway)	33–36	(Hungary) OTP Bank – Pick Szeged	Trondheim Spektrum, Trondheim; Attendance: 6,087; Referees: Elíasson, Pálsson (ISL)
27 November 2024; 18:45	three players 6	(16–17)	Šoštarič 7	Trondheim Spektrum, Trondheim; Attendance: 6,087; Referees: Elíasson, Pálsson (ISL)
27 November 2024; 18:45	1× (yellow card) 2× (suspension)	Report	1× (yellow card) 3× (suspension)	Trondheim Spektrum, Trondheim; Attendance: 6,087; Referees: Elíasson, Pálsson (ISL)

27 November 2024; 20:45	SC Magdeburg (Germany)	28–23	(Spain) Barça	GETEC Arena, Magdeburg; Attendance: 6,486; Referees: Horáček, Novotný (CZE)
27 November 2024; 20:45	Magnússon 8	(14–13)	three players 4	GETEC Arena, Magdeburg; Attendance: 6,486; Referees: Horáček, Novotný (CZE)
27 November 2024; 20:45	1× (yellow card) 1× (suspension)	Report	3× (suspension)	GETEC Arena, Magdeburg; Attendance: 6,486; Referees: Horáček, Novotný (CZE)

27 November 2024; 20:45	RK Zagreb (Croatia)	22–25	(France) HBC Nantes	Arena Zagreb, Zagreb; Attendance: 4,705; Referees: Kurtagic, Wetterwik (SWE)
27 November 2024; 20:45	Walczak 6	(12–13)	Tournat 7	Arena Zagreb, Zagreb; Attendance: 4,705; Referees: Kurtagic, Wetterwik (SWE)
27 November 2024; 20:45	1× (yellow card) 4× (suspension)	Report	3× (suspension)	Arena Zagreb, Zagreb; Attendance: 4,705; Referees: Kurtagic, Wetterwik (SWE)

4 December 2024; 18:45	Industria Kielce (Poland)	31–30	(Norway) Kolstad Håndball	Hala Legionów, Kielce; Attendance: 4,050; Referees: Konjičanin, Konjičanin (BIH)
4 December 2024; 18:45	A. Dujshebaev, Moryto 6	(15–13)	Sagosen 6	Hala Legionów, Kielce; Attendance: 4,050; Referees: Konjičanin, Konjičanin (BIH)
4 December 2024; 18:45	3× (suspension)	Report	2× (suspension) 1× (red card)	Hala Legionów, Kielce; Attendance: 4,050; Referees: Konjičanin, Konjičanin (BIH)

4 December 2024; 20:45	HBC Nantes (France)	29–28	(Germany) SC Magdeburg	H Arena, Nantes; Attendance: 10,356; Referees: Hansen, Madsen (DEN)
4 December 2024; 20:45	five players 5	(11–15)	Pettersson, Zehnder 6	H Arena, Nantes; Attendance: 10,356; Referees: Hansen, Madsen (DEN)
4 December 2024; 20:45	4× (suspension)	Report	2× (suspension)	H Arena, Nantes; Attendance: 10,356; Referees: Hansen, Madsen (DEN)

5 December 2024; 18:45	OTP Bank – Pick Szeged (Hungary)	30–32	(Denmark) Aalborg Håndbold	Pick Aréna, Szeged; Attendance: 7,050; Referees: Marín, García (ESP)
5 December 2024; 18:45	Šoštarič 12	(17–16)	Arnoldsen 8	Pick Aréna, Szeged; Attendance: 7,050; Referees: Marín, García (ESP)
5 December 2024; 18:45	2× (yellow card) 4× (suspension)	Report	4× (suspension)	Pick Aréna, Szeged; Attendance: 7,050; Referees: Marín, García (ESP)

5 December 2024; 20:45	Barça (Spain)	38–30	(Croatia) RK Zagreb	Palau Blaugrana, Barcelona; Attendance: 2,981; Referees: Sekulić, Jovandić (SRB)
5 December 2024; 20:45	Richardson 11	(23–16)	Dibirov 8	Palau Blaugrana, Barcelona; Attendance: 2,981; Referees: Sekulić, Jovandić (SRB)
5 December 2024; 20:45	4× (suspension)	Report	2× (yellow card) 4× (suspension)	Palau Blaugrana, Barcelona; Attendance: 2,981; Referees: Sekulić, Jovandić (SRB)

12 February 2025; 18:45	Aalborg Håndbold (Denmark)	36–35	(Spain) Barça	Gigantium, Aalborg; Attendance: 5,500; Referees: Erdoğan, Özdeniz (TUR)
12 February 2025; 18:45	Arnoldsen 9	(23–18)	Mem 9	Gigantium, Aalborg; Attendance: 5,500; Referees: Erdoğan, Özdeniz (TUR)
12 February 2025; 18:45	2× (suspension) 1× (red card)	Report	1× (suspension)	Gigantium, Aalborg; Attendance: 5,500; Referees: Erdoğan, Özdeniz (TUR)

12 February 2025; 18:45	Kolstad Håndball (Norway)	29–28	(France) HBC Nantes	Trondheim Spektrum, Trondheim; Attendance: 4,137; Referees: Martins, Martins (POR)
12 February 2025; 18:45	Lyse 7	(18–11)	Rivera Folch 7	Trondheim Spektrum, Trondheim; Attendance: 4,137; Referees: Martins, Martins (POR)
12 February 2025; 18:45	2× (yellow card) 4× (suspension)	Report	1× (yellow card) 3× (suspension)	Trondheim Spektrum, Trondheim; Attendance: 4,137; Referees: Martins, Martins (POR)

12 February 2025; 18:45	OTP Bank – Pick Szeged (Hungary)	26–27	(Croatia) RK Zagreb	Pick Aréna, Szeged; Attendance: 4,878; Referees: Mitrevski, Todorovski (MKD)
12 February 2025; 18:45	Šoštarič 8	(13–15)	Srna 8	Pick Aréna, Szeged; Attendance: 4,878; Referees: Mitrevski, Todorovski (MKD)
12 February 2025; 18:45	1× (yellow card) 7× (suspension)	Report	2× (yellow card) 6× (suspension) 1× (red card)	Pick Aréna, Szeged; Attendance: 4,878; Referees: Mitrevski, Todorovski (MKD)

12 February 2025; 20:45	Industria Kielce (Poland)	25–29	(Germany) SC Magdeburg	Hala Legionów, Kielce; Attendance: 4,200; Referees: Horváth, Marton (HUN)
12 February 2025; 20:45	D. Dujshebaev 6	(10–16)	Claar, Musche 7	Hala Legionów, Kielce; Attendance: 4,200; Referees: Horváth, Marton (HUN)
12 February 2025; 20:45	1× (yellow card) 4× (suspension) 2× (red card)	Report	1× (yellow card) 5× (suspension)	Hala Legionów, Kielce; Attendance: 4,200; Referees: Horváth, Marton (HUN)

19 February 2025; 18:45	RK Zagreb (Croatia)	25–25	(Norway) Kolstad Håndball	Arena Zagreb, Zagreb; Attendance: 13,524; Referees: Lah, Sok (SLO)
19 February 2025; 18:45	Bialiauski 8	(13–16)	Jeppsson 7	Arena Zagreb, Zagreb; Attendance: 13,524; Referees: Lah, Sok (SLO)
19 February 2025; 18:45	2× (yellow card) 2× (suspension)	Report	1× (yellow card) 3× (suspension) 1× (red card)	Arena Zagreb, Zagreb; Attendance: 13,524; Referees: Lah, Sok (SLO)

19 February 2025; 20:45	SC Magdeburg (Germany)	32–31	(Denmark) Aalborg Håndbold	GETEC Arena, Magdeburg; Attendance: 6,337; Referees: Nikolov, Nachevski (MKD)
19 February 2025; 20:45	Claar, Damgaard 8	(17–17)	Juul 8	GETEC Arena, Magdeburg; Attendance: 6,337; Referees: Nikolov, Nachevski (MKD)
19 February 2025; 20:45	4× (suspension)	Report	3× (suspension)	GETEC Arena, Magdeburg; Attendance: 6,337; Referees: Nikolov, Nachevski (MKD)

19 February 2025; 20:45	HBC Nantes (France)	32–29	(Hungary) OTP Bank – Pick Szeged	H Arena, Nantes; Attendance: 5,902; Referees: Horáček, Novotný (CZE)
19 February 2025; 20:45	Bos 8	(19–16)	five players 5	H Arena, Nantes; Attendance: 5,902; Referees: Horáček, Novotný (CZE)
19 February 2025; 20:45	5× (suspension)	Report	3× (suspension) 1× (red card)	H Arena, Nantes; Attendance: 5,902; Referees: Horáček, Novotný (CZE)

20 February 2025; 20:45	Barça (Spain)	30–28	(Poland) Industria Kielce	Palau Blaugrana, Barcelona; Attendance: 3,533; Referees: Kurtagic, Wetterwik (SWE)
20 February 2025; 20:45	N'Guessan 6	(14–13)	Maqueda 6	Palau Blaugrana, Barcelona; Attendance: 3,533; Referees: Kurtagic, Wetterwik (SWE)
20 February 2025; 20:45	2× (suspension)	Report	1× (yellow card) 3× (suspension)	Palau Blaugrana, Barcelona; Attendance: 3,533; Referees: Kurtagic, Wetterwik (SWE)

26 February 2025; 18:45	Aalborg Håndbold (Denmark)	33–30	(Croatia) RK Zagreb	Gigantium, Aalborg; Attendance: 5,445; Referees: Brkic, Jusufhodzic (AUT)
26 February 2025; 18:45	four players 5	(15–17)	Glavaš 8	Gigantium, Aalborg; Attendance: 5,445; Referees: Brkic, Jusufhodzic (AUT)
26 February 2025; 18:45	6× (suspension) 1× (red card)	Report	2× (yellow card) 3× (suspension)	Gigantium, Aalborg; Attendance: 5,445; Referees: Brkic, Jusufhodzic (AUT)

26 February 2025; 20:45	Industria Kielce (Poland)	28–28	(France) HBC Nantes	Hala Legionów, Kielce; Attendance: 4,200; Referees: Nikolov, Nachevski (MKD)
26 February 2025; 20:45	Nahi 7	(14–12)	Rivera Folch 6	Hala Legionów, Kielce; Attendance: 4,200; Referees: Nikolov, Nachevski (MKD)
26 February 2025; 20:45	5× (suspension)	Report	1× (yellow card) 6× (suspension)	Hala Legionów, Kielce; Attendance: 4,200; Referees: Nikolov, Nachevski (MKD)

27 February 2025; 18:45	OTP Bank – Pick Szeged (Hungary)	29–29	(Spain) Barça	Pick Aréna, Szeged; Attendance: 7,770; Referees: Covalciuc, Covalciuc (MDA)
27 February 2025; 18:45	Šoštarić 6	(17–14)	Gómez 6	Pick Aréna, Szeged; Attendance: 7,770; Referees: Covalciuc, Covalciuc (MDA)
27 February 2025; 18:45	1× (suspension) 1× (red card)	Report	1× (suspension)	Pick Aréna, Szeged; Attendance: 7,770; Referees: Covalciuc, Covalciuc (MDA)

27 February 2025; 18:45	Kolstad Håndball (Norway)	31–27	(Germany) SC Magdeburg	Trondheim Spektrum, Trondheim; Attendance: 2,450; Referees: Kurtagic, Wetterwik (SWE)
27 February 2025; 18:45	Jeppsson 11	(15–14)	Musche 9	Trondheim Spektrum, Trondheim; Attendance: 2,450; Referees: Kurtagic, Wetterwik (SWE)
27 February 2025; 18:45	4× (suspension)	Report	1× (yellow card) 3× (suspension)	Trondheim Spektrum, Trondheim; Attendance: 2,450; Referees: Kurtagic, Wetterwik (SWE)

5 March 2025; 18:45	SC Magdeburg (Germany)	31–24	(Hungary) OTP Bank – Pick Szeged	GETEC Arena, Magdeburg; Attendance: 6,293; Referees: Pavićević, Ražnatović (MNE)
5 March 2025; 18:45	Musche 9	(13–13)	Šoštarić 11	GETEC Arena, Magdeburg; Attendance: 6,293; Referees: Pavićević, Ražnatović (MNE)
5 March 2025; 18:45	2× (suspension)	Report	3× (suspension)	GETEC Arena, Magdeburg; Attendance: 6,293; Referees: Pavićević, Ražnatović (MNE)

5 March 2025; 18:45	RK Zagreb (Croatia)	26–27	(Poland) Industria Kielce	Arena Zagreb, Zagreb; Attendance: 6,478; Referees: Martins, Martins (POR)
5 March 2025; 18:45	Glavaš, Klarica 5	(12–15)	Kaddah, Nahi 5	Arena Zagreb, Zagreb; Attendance: 6,478; Referees: Martins, Martins (POR)
5 March 2025; 18:45	1× (yellow card) 6× (suspension)	Report	3× (suspension)	Arena Zagreb, Zagreb; Attendance: 6,478; Referees: Martins, Martins (POR)

5 March 2025; 18:45	Barça (Spain)	36–27	(Norway) Kolstad Håndball	Palau Blaugrana, Barcelona; Attendance: 1,516; Referees: Mitrevski, Todorovski (MKD)
5 March 2025; 18:45	Gómez 6	(18–13)	Jeppsson 10	Palau Blaugrana, Barcelona; Attendance: 1,516; Referees: Mitrevski, Todorovski (MKD)
5 March 2025; 18:45	1× (suspension)	Report	1× (yellow card)	Palau Blaugrana, Barcelona; Attendance: 1,516; Referees: Mitrevski, Todorovski (MKD)

5 March 2025; 20:45	HBC Nantes (France)	29–29	(Denmark) Aalborg Håndbold	H Arena, Nantes; Attendance: 5,902; Referees: Sekulić, Jovandić (SRB)
5 March 2025; 20:45	Briet, Rivera Folch 6	(18–14)	three players 5	H Arena, Nantes; Attendance: 5,902; Referees: Sekulić, Jovandić (SRB)
5 March 2025; 20:45	1× (yellow card) 4× (suspension) 1× (red card)	Report	1× (yellow card) 4× (suspension)	H Arena, Nantes; Attendance: 5,902; Referees: Sekulić, Jovandić (SRB)
