= 2024–25 EHF Champions League knockout stage =

Handball tournament

The 2024–25 EHF Champions League knockout stage began on 26 March with the playoffs and ended on 15 June 2025 with the final at the Lanxess Arena in Cologne, Germany, to decide the winners of the 2024–25 EHF Champions League. A total of twelve teams competed in the knockout phase.

== Format ==
In the playoffs, the eight teams ranked third to sixth in Groups A and B played against each other in two-legged home-and-away matches. The four winning teams advanced to the quarterfinals, where they were joined by the top-two teams of Groups A and B for another round of two-legged home-and-away matches. The four quarterfinal winners qualified for the final four tournament at the Lanxess Arena in Cologne, Germany.

== Qualified teams ==
The top six teams from Groups A and B qualified for the knockout stage.

Group	Qualified for quarterfinals		Qualified for playoffs			
Group	First place	Second place	Third place	Fourth place	Fifth place	Sixth place
A	(Hungary) One Veszprém	(Portugal) Sporting CP	(Germany) Füchse Berlin	(France) Paris Saint-Germain	(Romania) CS Dinamo București	(Poland) Orlen Wisła Płock
B	(Spain) Barça	(Denmark) Aalborg Håndbold	(France) HBC Nantes	(Germany) SC Magdeburg	(Hungary) OTP Bank – Pick Szeged	(Poland) Industria Kielce

== Playoffs ==
=== Overview ===
Team 1	Agg.	Team 2	1st leg	2nd leg
Industria Kielce (Poland)	64–70	(Germany) Füchse Berlin	27–33	37–37
Orlen Wisła Płock (Poland)	52–54	(France) HBC Nantes	28–25	24–29
OTP Bank – Pick Szeged (Hungary)	65–56	(France) Paris Saint-Germain	30–31	35–25
CS Dinamo București (Romania)	55–65	(Germany) SC Magdeburg	26–30	29–35

==== Matches ====
26 March 2025; 20:45	Industria Kielce (Poland)	27–33	(Germany) Füchse Berlin	Hala Legionów, Kielce; Attendance: 4,200; Referees: Pavićević, Ražnatović (MNE)
26 March 2025; 20:45	Nahi 6	(14–12)	Andersson 13	Hala Legionów, Kielce; Attendance: 4,200; Referees: Pavićević, Ražnatović (MNE)
26 March 2025; 20:45	1× (yellow card) 3× (suspension)	Report	1× (yellow card) 1× (suspension)	Hala Legionów, Kielce; Attendance: 4,200; Referees: Pavićević, Ražnatović (MNE)

2 April 2025; 18:45	Füchse Berlin (Germany)	37–37	(Poland) Industria Kielce	Max-Schmeling-Halle, Berlin; Attendance: 8,819; Referees: Lah, Sok (SLO)
2 April 2025; 18:45	Gidsel 12	(21–24)	Sićko 8	Max-Schmeling-Halle, Berlin; Attendance: 8,819; Referees: Lah, Sok (SLO)
2 April 2025; 18:45	5× (suspension)	Report	1× (yellow card) 7× (suspension)	Max-Schmeling-Halle, Berlin; Attendance: 8,819; Referees: Lah, Sok (SLO)

Füchse Berlin won 70–64 on aggregate.

27 March 2025; 20:45	Orlen Wisła Płock (Poland)	28–25	(France) HBC Nantes	Orlen Arena, Płock; Attendance: 5,284; Referees: Covalciuc, Covalciuc (MDA)
27 March 2025; 20:45	Krajewski 8	(17–12)	Bos 6	Orlen Arena, Płock; Attendance: 5,284; Referees: Covalciuc, Covalciuc (MDA)
27 March 2025; 20:45	2× (suspension)	Report	4× (suspension)	Orlen Arena, Płock; Attendance: 5,284; Referees: Covalciuc, Covalciuc (MDA)

2 April 2025; 20:45	HBC Nantes (France)	29–24	(Poland) Orlen Wisła Płock	H Arena, Nantes; Attendance: 5,902; Referees: Mitrevski, Todorovski (MKD)
2 April 2025; 20:45	Abdi 6	(17–8)	Michałowicz 6	H Arena, Nantes; Attendance: 5,902; Referees: Mitrevski, Todorovski (MKD)
2 April 2025; 20:45	2× (yellow card) 6× (suspension)	Report	2× (yellow card) 3× (suspension) 1× (red card)	H Arena, Nantes; Attendance: 5,902; Referees: Mitrevski, Todorovski (MKD)

HBC Nantes won 54–52 on aggregate.

27 March 2025; 18:45	OTP Bank – Pick Szeged (Hungary)	30–31	(France) Paris Saint-Germain	Pick Aréna, Szeged; Attendance: 6,603; Referees: Kurtagic, Wetterwik (SWE)
27 March 2025; 18:45	Kukić 6	(13–14)	Syprzak 8	Pick Aréna, Szeged; Attendance: 6,603; Referees: Kurtagic, Wetterwik (SWE)
27 March 2025; 18:45	1× (yellow card) 3× (suspension)	Report	4× (suspension)	Pick Aréna, Szeged; Attendance: 6,603; Referees: Kurtagic, Wetterwik (SWE)

3 April 2025; 20:45	Paris Saint-Germain (France)	25–35	(Hungary) OTP Bank – Pick Szeged	Stade Pierre de Coubertin, Paris; Attendance: 2,716; Referees: Martins, Martins (POR)
3 April 2025; 20:45	Syprzak 8	(11–17)	Šoštarić 7	Stade Pierre de Coubertin, Paris; Attendance: 2,716; Referees: Martins, Martins (POR)
3 April 2025; 20:45	4× (suspension)	Report	6× (suspension) 1× (red card)	Stade Pierre de Coubertin, Paris; Attendance: 2,716; Referees: Martins, Martins (POR)

OTP Bank – Pick Szeged won 65–56 on aggregate.

26 March 2025; 18:45	CS Dinamo București (Romania)	26–30	(Germany) SC Magdeburg	Polyvalent Hall, Bucharest; Attendance: 4,100; Referees: Bíró, Kiss (HUN)
26 March 2025; 18:45	Akimenko 6	(11–16)	Magnússon 6	Polyvalent Hall, Bucharest; Attendance: 4,100; Referees: Bíró, Kiss (HUN)
26 March 2025; 18:45	1× (yellow card) 3× (suspension)	Report	2× (suspension)	Polyvalent Hall, Bucharest; Attendance: 4,100; Referees: Bíró, Kiss (HUN)

2 April 2025; 20:45	SC Magdeburg (Germany)	35–29	(Romania) CS Dinamo București	Anhalt-Arena, Dessau-Roßlau; Attendance: 2,424; Referees: Álvarez, Bustamante (ESP)
2 April 2025; 20:45	Magnússon 8	(21–10)	Vujović 6	Anhalt-Arena, Dessau-Roßlau; Attendance: 2,424; Referees: Álvarez, Bustamante (ESP)
2 April 2025; 20:45	1× (yellow card) 3× (suspension)	Report	4× (suspension)	Anhalt-Arena, Dessau-Roßlau; Attendance: 2,424; Referees: Álvarez, Bustamante (ESP)

SC Magdeburg won 65–55 on aggregate.

== Quarterfinals ==
=== Overview ===
Team 1	Agg.	Team 2	1st leg	2nd leg
SC Magdeburg (Germany)	54–53	(Hungary) One Veszprém	26–26	28–27
OTP Bank – Pick Szeged (Hungary)	54–56	(Spain) Barça	24–27	30–29
HBC Nantes (France)	60–57	(Portugal) Sporting CP	28–27	32–30
Füchse Berlin (Germany)	77–65	(Denmark) Aalborg Håndbold	37–29	40–36

==== Matches ====
23 April 2025; 18:45	SC Magdeburg (Germany)	26–26	(Hungary) One Veszprém	GETEC Arena, Magdeburg; Attendance: 6,263; Referees: Horáček, Novotný (CZE)
23 April 2025; 18:45	Lagergren 8	(11–14)	Fabregas 9	GETEC Arena, Magdeburg; Attendance: 6,263; Referees: Horáček, Novotný (CZE)
23 April 2025; 18:45	1× (suspension)	Report	3× (suspension)	GETEC Arena, Magdeburg; Attendance: 6,263; Referees: Horáček, Novotný (CZE)

1 May 2025; 18:45	One Veszprém (Hungary)	27–28	(Germany) SC Magdeburg	Veszprém Aréna, Veszprém; Attendance: 5,300; Referees: Jørum, Kleven (NOR)
1 May 2025; 18:45	Fabregas 7	(13–13)	Claar 7	Veszprém Aréna, Veszprém; Attendance: 5,300; Referees: Jørum, Kleven (NOR)
1 May 2025; 18:45	1× (yellow card) 3× (suspension)	Report	1× (yellow card) 1× (suspension)	Veszprém Aréna, Veszprém; Attendance: 5,300; Referees: Jørum, Kleven (NOR)

SC Magdeburg won 54–53 on aggregate.

24 April 2025; 18:45	OTP Bank – Pick Szeged (Hungary)	24–27	(Spain) Barça	Pick Aréna, Szeged; Attendance: 7,993; Referees: Elíasson, Pálsson (ISL)
24 April 2025; 18:45	Šoštarić 8	(10–9)	Mem 10	Pick Aréna, Szeged; Attendance: 7,993; Referees: Elíasson, Pálsson (ISL)
24 April 2025; 18:45	1× (yellow card) 3× (suspension)	Report	1× (yellow card) 5× (suspension)	Pick Aréna, Szeged; Attendance: 7,993; Referees: Elíasson, Pálsson (ISL)

1 May 2025; 20:45	Barça (Spain)	29–30	(Hungary) OTP Bank – Pick Szeged	Palau Blaugrana, Barcelona; Attendance: 4,268; Referees: Boričić, Marković (SRB)
1 May 2025; 20:45	Mem 6	(16–14)	Frimmel 10	Palau Blaugrana, Barcelona; Attendance: 4,268; Referees: Boričić, Marković (SRB)
1 May 2025; 20:45	2× (yellow card) 3× (suspension)	Report	1× (yellow card) 6× (suspension)	Palau Blaugrana, Barcelona; Attendance: 4,268; Referees: Boričić, Marković (SRB)

Barça won 56–54 on aggregate.

23 April 2025; 20:45	HBC Nantes (France)	28–27	(Portugal) Sporting CP	H Arena, Nantes; Attendance: 5,902; Referees: Schulze, Tönnies (GER)
23 April 2025; 20:45	Minne 7	(13–10)	M. Costa 8	H Arena, Nantes; Attendance: 5,902; Referees: Schulze, Tönnies (GER)
23 April 2025; 20:45	1× (yellow card)	Report	2× (yellow card) 1× (suspension)	H Arena, Nantes; Attendance: 5,902; Referees: Schulze, Tönnies (GER)

30 April 2025; 20:45	Sporting CP (Portugal)	30–32	(France) HBC Nantes	Pavilhão João Rocha, Lisbon; Attendance: 2,667; Referees: Konjičanin, Konjičanin (BIH)
30 April 2025; 20:45	M. Costa 8	(15–16)	Minne 8	Pavilhão João Rocha, Lisbon; Attendance: 2,667; Referees: Konjičanin, Konjičanin (BIH)
30 April 2025; 20:45	1× (yellow card) 1× (suspension)	Report	3× (suspension) 1× (red card)	Pavilhão João Rocha, Lisbon; Attendance: 2,667; Referees: Konjičanin, Konjičanin (BIH)

HBC Nantes won 60–57 on aggregate.

24 April 2025; 20:45	Füchse Berlin (Germany)	37–29	(Denmark) Aalborg Håndbold	Max-Schmeling-Halle, Berlin; Attendance: 8,520; Referees: Marín, García (ESP)
24 April 2025; 20:45	Gidsel 11	(14–15)	Hangaard 7	Max-Schmeling-Halle, Berlin; Attendance: 8,520; Referees: Marín, García (ESP)
24 April 2025; 20:45	1× (yellow card) 4× (suspension) 2× (red card)	Report	4× (suspension)	Max-Schmeling-Halle, Berlin; Attendance: 8,520; Referees: Marín, García (ESP)

30 April 2025; 18:45	Aalborg Håndbold (Denmark)	36–40	(Germany) Füchse Berlin	Gigantium, Aalborg; Attendance: 5,500; Referees: Nikolov, Nachevski (MKD)
30 April 2025; 18:45	Bjørnsen 9	(20–21)	Gidsel 9	Gigantium, Aalborg; Attendance: 5,500; Referees: Nikolov, Nachevski (MKD)
30 April 2025; 18:45	1× (yellow card) 2× (suspension)	Report	1× (yellow card) 4× (suspension)	Gigantium, Aalborg; Attendance: 5,500; Referees: Nikolov, Nachevski (MKD)

Füchse Berlin won 77–65 on aggregate.

== Final four ==
The final four was held at the Lanxess Arena in Cologne, Germany on 14 and 15 June 2024. The draw took place on 2 May 2025.

=== Bracket ===
Semi-finals
14 June
(Germany) Füchse Berlin	34
(France) HBC Nantes	24
14 June
(Spain) Barça	30
(Germany) SC Magdeburg	31

Final
15 June
(Germany) Füchse Berlin	26
(Germany) SC Magdeburg	32
Third place
15 June
(France) HBC Nantes	30
(Spain) Barça	25

=== Semifinals ===
14 June 2025; 15:00	Füchse Berlin (Germany)	34–24	(France) HBC Nantes	Lanxess Arena, Cologne; Attendance: 20,074; Referees: Elíasson, Pálsson (ISL)
14 June 2025; 15:00	Freihöfer 10	(18–12)	Tournat 6	Lanxess Arena, Cologne; Attendance: 20,074; Referees: Elíasson, Pálsson (ISL)
14 June 2025; 15:00	5× (suspension) 1× (red card)	Report	1× (yellow card) 6× (suspension)	Lanxess Arena, Cologne; Attendance: 20,074; Referees: Elíasson, Pálsson (ISL)

14 June 2025; 18:00	Barça (Spain)	30–31	(Germany) SC Magdeburg	Lanxess Arena, Cologne; Attendance: 20,074; Referees: Nikolov, Nachevski (MKD)
14 June 2025; 18:00	Mem 8	(18–18)	Magnússon 11	Lanxess Arena, Cologne; Attendance: 20,074; Referees: Nikolov, Nachevski (MKD)
14 June 2025; 18:00	2× (suspension) 3× (red card)	Report	4× (suspension)	Lanxess Arena, Cologne; Attendance: 20,074; Referees: Nikolov, Nachevski (MKD)

=== Third place game ===
15 June 2025; 15:00	HBC Nantes (France)	30–25	(Spain) Barça	Lanxess Arena, Cologne; Attendance: 20,074; Referees: Covalciuc, Covalciuc (MDA)
15 June 2025; 15:00	Odriozola 6	(14–9)	Richardson 8	Lanxess Arena, Cologne; Attendance: 20,074; Referees: Covalciuc, Covalciuc (MDA)
15 June 2025; 15:00	1× (suspension) 1× (red card)	Report	4× (suspension)	Lanxess Arena, Cologne; Attendance: 20,074; Referees: Covalciuc, Covalciuc (MDA)

=== Final ===
15 June 2025; 18:00	Füchse Berlin (Germany)	26–32	(Germany) SC Magdeburg	Lanxess Arena, Cologne; Attendance: 20,074; Referees: Lah, Sok (SLO)
15 June 2025; 18:00	Gidsel, West av Teigum 7	(12–16)	Kristjánsson 8	Lanxess Arena, Cologne; Attendance: 20,074; Referees: Lah, Sok (SLO)
15 June 2025; 18:00	2× (yellow card) 5× (suspension)	Report	1× (yellow card) 2× (suspension) 1× (red card)	Lanxess Arena, Cologne; Attendance: 20,074; Referees: Lah, Sok (SLO)
