= 2024–25 EHF Champions League =

European handball tournament

EHF Champions League
- 2024–25

Tournament information
- Sport: Handball
- Location: Lanxess Arena (FINAL4)
- Dates: 11 September 2024–15 June 2025
- Teams: 16
- Website: ehfcl.com

Final positions
- Champions: (Germany) SC Magdeburg
- Runner-up: (Germany) Füchse Berlin

Tournament statistics
- Matches played: 132
- Goals scored: 7760 (58.79 per match)
- Attendance: 691,702 (5,240 per match)
- MVP: (Iceland) Gísli Þorgeir Kristjánsson
- Top scorer(s): (Denmark) Mathias Gidsel (135 goals)

The 2024–25 EHF Champions League was the 65th edition of Europe's premier club handball tournament, running from 11 September 2024 to 15 June 2025.

FC Barcelona were the defending champions. SC Magdeburg won the final against Füchse Berlin to win their fifth title.

== Format ==
The tournament used the same format as the previous three seasons. The competition began with a group stage featuring sixteen teams divided into two groups. Matches were played in a double round-robin system with home-and-away fixtures, fourteen in total for each team. In Groups A and B, the top two teams automatically qualified for the quarter-finals, with teams ranked third to sixth entered the playoff round.

The knockout stage included four rounds: the playoffs, quarter-finals, and a final-four tournament comprising two semifinals and the final. In the playoffs, eight teams were paired against each other in two-legged home-and-away matches (third-placed in group A played sixth-placed group B; fourth-placed group A played fifth-placed group B, etc.). The four aggregate winners of the playoffs advanced to the quarterfinals, joining the top-two teams of Groups A and B. The eight quarterfinalist teams were paired against each other in two-legged home-and-away matches, with the four aggregate winners qualifying to the final-four tournament.

In the final four tournament, the semifinals and the final were played as single matches at a pre-selected host venue.

== Rankings ==
Ten of the sixteen teams competing in the group stage were determined through the EHF association ranking for the 2024–25 season, based on the results of the three previous seasons. The remaining six places were awarded as wildcards.

- Associations ranked 1–9 had their league champion qualify for the group stage and could apply their league runner-up for a wildcard.
- The best-ranked association in the EHF European League could had its league champion and runner-up qualify for the group stage, but could not apply for a wildcard.
- Associations ranked outside the top nine could only had their league champion apply for a wildcard.

Rank	Association	Average points	Teams
1	Spain	217,00	1
2	Germany	170.00	2
3	Poland	156.67	2
4	France	140.33	2
5	Denmark	137.00	2
6	Hungary	124.33	2
7	Belarus	69.50	0
8	Portugal	61.67	1

Rank	Association	Average points	Teams
9	Norway	57.00	1
10	Ukraine	57.00	0
11	Romania	56.50	1
12	Slovenia	52.00	0
13	North Macedonia	50.33	1
14	Croatia	44.00	1
15	36 associations	0.00	0

== Teams ==
The first nine teams were revealed on 7 June 2024. The teams who applied for a wildcard were announced on 13 June 2024. On 21 June, the final list was announced.

(Denmark) Aalborg Håndbold (1st)	(France) Paris Saint-Germain (1st)	(Spain) Barcelona (1st)	(Germany) SC Magdeburg (1st)
(Germany) Füchse Berlin (2nd)	(Hungary) One Veszprém (1st)	(Norway) Kolstad Håndball (1st)	(Poland) Orlen Wisła Płock (1st)
(Portugal) Sporting CP (1st)	(Croatia) RK Zagreb (1st)^{WC}	(France) HBC Nantes (2nd)^{WC}	(Hungary) OTP Bank – Pick Szeged (2nd)^{WC}
(North Macedonia) RK Eurofarm Pelister (1st)^{WC}	(Poland) Industria Kielce (2nd)^{WC}	(Romania) CS Dinamo București (1st)^{WC}	(Denmark) Fredericia HK (2nd)^{WC}

Rejected upgrades

(Spain) CD Bidasoa Irun (2nd)	(Norway) Elverum Håndball (2nd)	(Portugal) FC Porto (2nd)
(Switzerland) Kadetten Schaffhausen (1st)	(Slovakia) HT Tatran Prešov (1st)	

== Draw ==
The draw was held on 27 June 2024.

== Group stage ==
Location of teams of the 2024–25 EHF Champions League group stage.
Red: Group A; Blue: Group B.

The 16 teams were drawn into two groups of eight. Teams from the same national association could not be drawn into the same group.

In the group stage, teams were ranked according to points (2 points for a win, 1 point for a draw, 0 points for a loss). After completion of the group stage, if two or more teams have scored the same number of points, the ranking will be determined as follows:

1. Highest number of points in matches between the teams directly involved;
2. Superior goal difference in matches between the teams directly involved;
3. Highest number of goals scored in matches between the teams directly involved;
4. Superior goal difference in all matches of the group;
5. Highest number of plus goals in all matches of the group;
6. Drawing of Lots

A total of 11 national associations were represented in the group stage, with the only difference being that Romania replace Slovenia. Fredericia HK returned for the first time in 40 years. Sporting CP came back after five years.

=== Group A ===
Pos	Team	Pld	W	D	L	GF	GA	GD	Pts	Qualification	VES	SPO	BER	PAR	BUC	PLO	PEL	FRE
1	(Hungary) One Veszprém	14	12	0	2	468	408	+60	24	Quarterfinals	—	33–32	32–33	41–28	36–24	30–26	33–26	34–32
2	(Portugal) Sporting CP	14	8	2	4	454	399	+55	18 (Note: Sporting 4 Pts, +10 GD; Berlin 4 Pts, 0 GD; Paris 4 Pts, −10 GD.)	Quarterfinals	39–30	—	35–33	39–28	34–25	34–29	30–24	32–29
3	(Germany) Füchse Berlin	14	9	0	5	469	440	+29	18	Playoffs	31–32	33–32	—	38–40	38–29	25–24	39–29	36–29
4	(France) Paris Saint-Germain	14	9	0	5	462	456	+6	18	Playoffs	33–37	30–28	34–37	—	35–32	28–31	31–29	38–30
5	(Romania) CS Dinamo București	14	6	0	8	426	439	−13	12	Playoffs	26–33	33–29	38–31	33–40	—	26–27	34–25	37–28
6	(Poland) Orlen Wisła Płock	14	5	1	8	370	366	+4	11	Playoffs	24–27	29–29	32–27	23–24	26–28	—	26–18	30–21
7	(North Macedonia) RK Eurofarm Pelister	14	3	2	9	346	406	−60	8		23–30	24–24	22–30	26–35	25–24	21–18	—	29–29
8	(Denmark) Fredericia HK	14	1	1	12	395	476	−81	3		31–40	19–37	32–38	32–38	32–37	28–25	23–25	—

Source: EHF
Rules for classification: Tiebreakers

=== Group B ===
Pos	Team	Pld	W	D	L	GF	GA	GD	Pts	Qualification	BAR	AAL	NAN	MAG	SZE	KIE	KOL	ZAG
1	(Spain) Barça	14	10	2	2	454	409	+45	22	Quarterfinals	—	35–27	36–30	32–26	31–30	30–28	36–27	38–30
2	(Denmark) Aalborg Håndbold	14	8	2	4	434	421	+13	18	Quarterfinals	36–35	—	38–31	33–33	29–28	34–26	30–28	33–30
3	(France) HBC Nantes	14	7	3	4	426	407	+19	17	Playoffs	31–31	29–29	—	29–28	32–29	23–20	44–27	32–29
4	(Germany) SC Magdeburg	14	6	1	7	404	389	+15	13 (Note: Magdeburg 2 Pts, +5 GD; Szeged 2 Pts, −5 GD.)	Playoffs	28–23	32–31	28–32	—	31–24	26–27	33–25	36–24
5	(Hungary) OTP Bank – Pick Szeged	14	6	1	7	421	422	−1	13	Playoffs	29–29	30–32	33–32	31–29	—	28–27	27–29	26–27
6	(Poland) Industria Kielce	14	5	1	8	389	411	−22	11 (Note: Kielce 4 Pts; Kolstad 0 Pts.)	Playoffs	28–32	28–35	28–28	25–29	31–35	—	31–30	30–23
7	(Norway) Kolstad Håndball	14	5	1	8	400	434	−34	11		30–35	25–24	29–28	31–27	33–36	32–33	—	29–25
8	(Croatia) RK Zagreb	14	3	1	10	373	408	−35	7		29–31	31–23	22–25	22–18	30–35	26–27	25–25	—

Source: EHF
Rules for classification: Tiebreakers

== Knockout stage ==
=== Playoffs ===
Team 1	Agg.	Team 2	1st leg	2nd leg
Industria Kielce (Poland)	64–70	(Germany) Füchse Berlin	27–33	37–37
Orlen Wisła Płock (Poland)	52–54	(France) HBC Nantes	28–25	24–29
OTP Bank – Pick Szeged (Hungary)	65–56	(France) Paris Saint-Germain	30–31	35–25
CS Dinamo București (Romania)	55–65	(Germany) SC Magdeburg	26–30	29–35

=== Quarterfinals ===
Team 1	Agg.	Team 2	1st leg	2nd leg
SC Magdeburg (Germany)	54–53	(Hungary) One Veszprém	26–26	28–27
OTP Bank – Pick Szeged (Hungary)	54–56	(Spain) Barça	24–27	30–29
HBC Nantes (France)	60–57	(Portugal) Sporting CP	28–27	32–30
Füchse Berlin (Germany)	77–65	(Denmark) Aalborg Håndbold	37–29	40–36

=== Final four ===
The final four was held at the Lanxess Arena in Cologne, Germany on 14 and 15 June 2025.

==== Bracket ====
Semi-finals
14 June
(Germany) Füchse Berlin	34
(France) HBC Nantes	24
14 June
(Spain) Barça	30
(Germany) SC Magdeburg	31

Final
15 June
(Germany) Füchse Berlin	26
(Germany) SC Magdeburg	32
Third place
15 June
(France) HBC Nantes	30
(Spain) Barça	25

==== Final ====
15 June 2025; 18:00	Füchse Berlin (Germany)	26–32	(Germany) SC Magdeburg	Lanxess Arena, Cologne; Attendance: 20,074; Referees: Lah, Sok (SLO)
15 June 2025; 18:00	Gidsel, West av Teigum 7	(12–16)	Kristjánsson 8	Lanxess Arena, Cologne; Attendance: 20,074; Referees: Lah, Sok (SLO)
15 June 2025; 18:00	2× (yellow card) 5× (suspension)	Report	1× (yellow card) 2× (suspension) 1× (red card)	Lanxess Arena, Cologne; Attendance: 20,074; Referees: Lah, Sok (SLO)

== Top goalscorers ==
Rank	Player	Club	Goals
1	(Denmark) Mathias Gidsel	(Germany) Füchse Berlin	135
2	(Croatia) Mario Šoštarić	(Hungary) OTP Bank - Pick Szeged	130
3	(Denmark) Lasse Andersson	(Germany) Füchse Berlin	115
4	(Portugal) Martim Costa	(Portugal) Sporting CP	105
5	(Poland) Kamil Syprzak	(France) Paris Saint-Germain	104
6	(France) Aymeric Minne	(France) HBC Nantes	88
6	(Spain) Valero Rivera Folch	(France) HBC Nantes	88
8	(North Macedonia) Filip Kuzmanovski	(North Macedonia) RK Eurofarm Pelister	87
9	(Germany) Tim Freihöfer	(Germany) Füchse Berlin	82
10	(Portugal) Francisco Costa	(Portugal) Sporting CP	79
10	(France) Nedim Remili	(Hungary) One Veszprém	79
10	(Iceland) Ómar Ingi Magnússon	(Germany) SC Magdeburg	79

== Awards ==
The All-star team of the Champions League 2024/25

Position	Player
Goalkeeper	(Denmark) Emil Nielsen (Barça)
Right wing	(Croatia) Mario Šoštarić (OTP Bank-PICK Szeged)
Right back	(Denmark) Mathias Gidsel (Füchse Berlin)
Centre back	(Iceland) Gísli Þorgeir Kristjánsson (SC Magdeburg)
Left back	(Sweden) Felix Claar (SC Magdeburg)
Left wing	(Denmark) Emil Jakobsen (SG Flensburg-Handewitt)
Pivot	(France) Ludovic Fabregas (One Veszprém HC)
Final four MVP	(Iceland) Gísli Þorgeir Kristjánsson (SC Magdeburg)
Best defender	(Denmark) Magnus Saugstrup (SC Magdeburg)

Final four MVP: (Iceland) Gísli Þorgeir Kristjánsson

== See also ==
- 2024–25 EHF European League
- 2024–25 EHF European Cup
- 2024–25 Women's EHF Champions League
- 2024–25 Women's EHF European League
- 2024–25 Women's EHF European Cup
