= 2023–24 Handball-Bundesliga =

Handball-Bundesliga
- Season: 2023–24
- Dates: 24 August 2023 – 2 June 2024
- Champions: SC Magdeburg
- Relegated: Bergischer HC; HBW Balingen-Weilstetten
- Champions League: SC Magdeburg; Füchse Berlin
- EHF European League: SG Flensburg-Handewitt; THW Kiel; MT Melsungen; VfL Gummersbach
- Matches: 306
- Goals: 18,023 (58.9 per match)
- Best Player: Magnus Saugstrup
- Top goalscorer: Manuel Zehnder (277 goals)
- Attendance: 1,596,370 (5,217 per match)

The 2023–24 Handball-Bundesliga was the 59th season of the Handball-Bundesliga, Germany's premier handball league and the 47th season consisting of only one league. It ran from 24 August 2023 to 2 June 2024.

SC Magdeburg won their third title.

== Teams ==
Locations of the 2023–24 Handball-Bundesliga teams

=== Team changes ===
Promoted from 2022–23 2. Handball-Bundesliga	Relegated from 2022–23 Handball-Bundesliga
HBW Balingen-Weilstetten; ThSV Eisenach	ASV Hamm-Westfalen; GWD Minden

=== Venues ===
Team	Location	Arena	Capacity
HBW Balingen-Weilstetten	Balingen	Sparkassen-Arena; Porsche-Arena	2,320; 6,181
Bergischer HC	Wuppertal; Solingen; Düsseldorf	Uni-Halle; Klingenhalle; Mitsubishi Electric Halle; PSD Bank Dome	3,200; 2,800; 4,500; 12,500
Füchse Berlin	Berlin	Max-Schmeling-Halle	9,000
TVB 1898 Stuttgart	Stuttgart	Porsche-Arena	6,211
ThSV Eisenach	Eisenach	Werner-Aßmann-Halle	3,100
HC Erlangen	Nuremberg	Arena Nürnberger Versicherung	8,308
SG Flensburg-Handewitt	Flensburg	Campushalle	6,300
VfL Gummersbach	Gummersbach	Schwalbe-Arena	4,132
Frisch Auf Göppingen	Göppingen	EWS Arena	5,600
HSV Hamburg	Hamburg	Alsterdorfer Sporthalle	7,000
TSV Hannover-Burgdorf	Hanover	ZAG-Arena; Swiss Life Hall	9,850; 4,460
THW Kiel	Kiel	Wunderino Arena	10,285
SC DHfK Leipzig	Leipzig	Quarterback Immobilien Arena	6,327
TBV Lemgo	Lemgo	Phoenix Contact Arena	4,790
SC Magdeburg	Magdeburg	GETEC Arena	6,600
MT Melsungen	Kassel	Rothenbach-Halle	4,500
Rhein-Neckar Löwen	Mannheim	SAP Arena	13,200
HSG Wetzlar	Wetzlar	Buderus Arena Wetzlar	4,421

== Standings ==
Pos	Team	Pld	W	D	L	GF	GA	GD	Pts	Qualification or relegation
1	SC Magdeburg (C)	34	30	2	2	1135	927	+208	62	Champions League
2	Füchse Berlin	34	26	4	4	1107	996	+111	56	Champions League
3	SG Flensburg-Handewitt	34	23	4	7	1107	981	+126	50	EHF European League
4	THW Kiel	34	22	3	9	1089	987	+102	47	EHF European League
5	MT Melsungen	34	20	4	10	973	935	+38	44	EHF European League
6	VfL Gummersbach	34	20	3	11	1060	1020	+40	43	EHF European League
7	TSV Hannover-Burgdorf	34	17	5	12	1000	994	+6	39	
8	SC DHfK Leipzig	34	15	3	16	995	978	+17	33	
9	HSV Hamburg (Note: On 3 May 2024, it was announced that HSV Hamburg did not get the license for the next season, which would see them relegated. This was appealed by Hamburg. Hamburg was given the licence on 31 May with a specific condition.)	34	13	4	17	1013	1077	−64	30	
10	TBV Lemgo	34	12	4	18	978	978	0	28	
11	TVB 1898 Stuttgart	34	12	2	20	996	1048	−52	26	
12	Rhein-Neckar Löwen	34	12	2	20	961	1022	−61	26	
13	HSG Wetzlar	34	12	2	20	924	999	−75	26	
14	ThSV Eisenach	34	11	2	21	951	1012	−61	24	
15	Frisch Auf Göppingen	34	10	3	21	965	1019	−54	23	
16	HC Erlangen	34	10	2	22	901	972	−71	22	
17	Bergischer HC (R)	34	9	2	23	965	1047	−82	20	Relegated to 2. Handball-Bundesliga
18	HBW Balingen-Weilstetten (R)	34	5	3	26	903	1031	−128	13	Relegated to 2. Handball-Bundesliga

Source: HBL
Rules for classification: 1) points; 2) goal difference; 3) goals scored; 4) head-to-head points; 5) head-to-head goal difference; 6) head-to-head number of goals scored.
(C) Champions; (R) Relegated

== Results ==
Home \ Away	BAL	BRG	BER	BIT	EIS	ERL	FLE	GÖP	GUM	HAM	HAN	KIE	LEI	LEM	MAG	MEL	RNL	WET
HBW Balingen-Weilstetten	—	21–25	26–37	29–28	21–34	25–27	32–34	30–29	31–34	37–30	25–29	25–36	17–25	26–30	28–34	22–25	31–33	27–30
Bergischer HC	27–28	—	30–34	33–28	27–30	28–25	30–40	33–30	24–31	29–28	26–29	25–29	31–31	31–31	27–30	32–31	29–31	23–28
Füchse Berlin	35–34	29–30	—	32–27	37–29	39–32	32–31	29–29	29–26	37–31	34–33	32–32	37–28	30–28	31–26	37–31	38–32	32–30
TVB 1898 Stuttgart	30–27	27–26	29–30	—	28–22	29–30	34–31	31–29	29–31	35–26	32–28	31–36	25–27	29–27	25–31	33–31	32–31	30–25
ThSV Eisenach	28–28	31–30	27–31	33–28	—	28–26	28–27	27–24	24–26	28–32	31–31	32–40	25–24	25–30	25–35	24–27	29–26	23–27
HC Erlangen	22–22	28–27	27–35	26–23	28–23	—	22–27	28–26	31–34	30–28	25–27	27–31	26–29	26–25	31–31	27–32	28–23	26–27
SG Flensburg-Handewitt	32–28	33–28	31–31	39–31	35–28	32–25	—	35–30	28–34	37–32	31–28	28–27	34–24	34–29	29–32	34–24	33–25	33–26
Frisch Auf Göppingen	32–28	31–28	27–32	25–25	35–31	32–29	32–31	—	32–29	27–32	32–25	27–34	27–30	26–32	26–27	22–32	27–27	32–27
VfL Gummersbach	33–25	27–33	30–30	35–27	37–31	33–28	32–42	33–32	—	24–23	33–33	40–29	30–29	30–27	30–38	37–31	31–26	35–28
HSV Hamburg	28–28	32–30	30–32	31–36	23–29	31–23	30–41	33–31	33–33	—	28–30	28–28	35–34	37–33	28–43	29–22	32–36	30–25
TSV Hannover-Burgdorf	35–26	37–28	25–28	33–20	31–30	27–23	26–26	33–26	32–29	25–26	—	36–33	25–25	34–32	28–27	30–34	34–29	30–33
THW Kiel	36–29	39–30	30–26	39–36	31–27	31–27	26–33	32–27	41–30	34–23	34–20	—	37–28	33–29	26–33	30–35	26–30	33–22
SC DHfK Leipzig	26–25	33–22	29–31	36–30	29–31	20–19	32–35	33–35	32–35	39–27	26–27	35–34	—	29–28	27–27	32–27	29–24	36–30
TBV Lemgo	37–27	31–28	29–32	31–25	26–24	28–27	31–31	21–26	23–26	34–34	28–23	27–28	22–28	—	28–34	25–28	33–25	31–23
SC Magdeburg	43–29	40–28	31–28	40–31	38–31	27–22	31–29	31–27	32–30	35–24	31–29	34–31	30–28	35–28	—	39–24	38–24	37–34
MT Melsungen	26–24	31–26	30–28	35–27	27–26	32–25	25–25	29–19	26–25	33–26	34–26	23–23	28–27	26–25	29–29	—	30–23	21–23
Rhein-Neckar Löwen	25–21	35–29	28–36	32–24	26–27	34–24	26–35	33–29	28–26	34–36	27–29	25–31	32–28	34–34	21–34	23–28	—	26–21
HSG Wetzlar	16–21	28–32	30–36	31–31	31–30	26–31	30–31	29–24	33–31	25–27	32–32	27–29	30–27	24–27	15–31	28–27	30–27	—

Source: DKB
Legend: Blue = home team win; Yellow = draw; Red = away team win.

== Top goalscorers ==
Rank	Player	Club	Goals	Shots	%
1	(Switzerland) Manuel Zehnder	ThSV Eisenach	277	462	60
2	(Denmark) Mathias Gidsel	Füchse Berlin	263	362	73
3	(Iceland) Ómar Ingi Magnússon	SC Magdeburg	239	342	70
4	(Denmark) Lasse Andersson	Füchse Berlin	209	372	56
5	(Denmark) Casper Ulrich Mortensen	HSV Hamburg	203	299	68
6	(Iceland) Viggó Kristjánsson	SC DHfK Leipzig	200	301	66
7	(Denmark) Hans Lindberg	Füchse Berlin	198	243	81
8	(Denmark) Emil Jakobsen	SG Flensburg-Handewitt	197	272	72
9	(Slovenia) Domen Novak	HSG Wetzlar	183	248	74
10	(Germany) Kai Häfner	TVB 1898 Stuttgart	179	332	54

== Awards ==
Award	Player	Club
Most valuable player	(Denmark) Magnus Saugstrup	SC Magdeburg
Coach of the season	(Germany) Bennet Wiegert	SC Magdeburg
Young player of the season	(Germany) Nils Lichtlein	Füchse Berlin

== Attendances ==
The league average was 5,204.

#	Club	Home games	Total	Average
1	THW Kiel	17	172,714	10,160
2	Füchse Berlin	17	142,298	8,370
3	Rhein-Neckar Löwen	17	134,953	7,938
4	TSV Hannover-Burgdorf	17	115,062	6,768
5	SC Magdeburg	17	111,722	6,572
6	SG Flensburg-Handewitt	17	105,116	6,183
7	HC Erlangen	17	102,282	6,017
8	TVB Stuttgart	17	80,332	4,725
9	SC DHfK Leipzig	17	78,735	4,631
10	Frisch Auf! Göppingen	17	76,000	4,471
11	Handball Sport Verein Hamburg	17	75,339	4,432
12	VfL Gummersbach	17	67,788	3,988
13	MT Melsungen	17	67,447	3,967
14	TBV Lemgo	17	66,106	3,889
15	HSG Wetzlar	17	59,703	3,512
16	Bergischer HC	17	49,248	2,897
17	ThSV Eisenach	17	49,003	2,883
18	HBW Balingen-Weilstetten	17	39,226	2,307
