= Gísli Þorgeir Kristjánsson =

Icelandic handball player (born 1999)

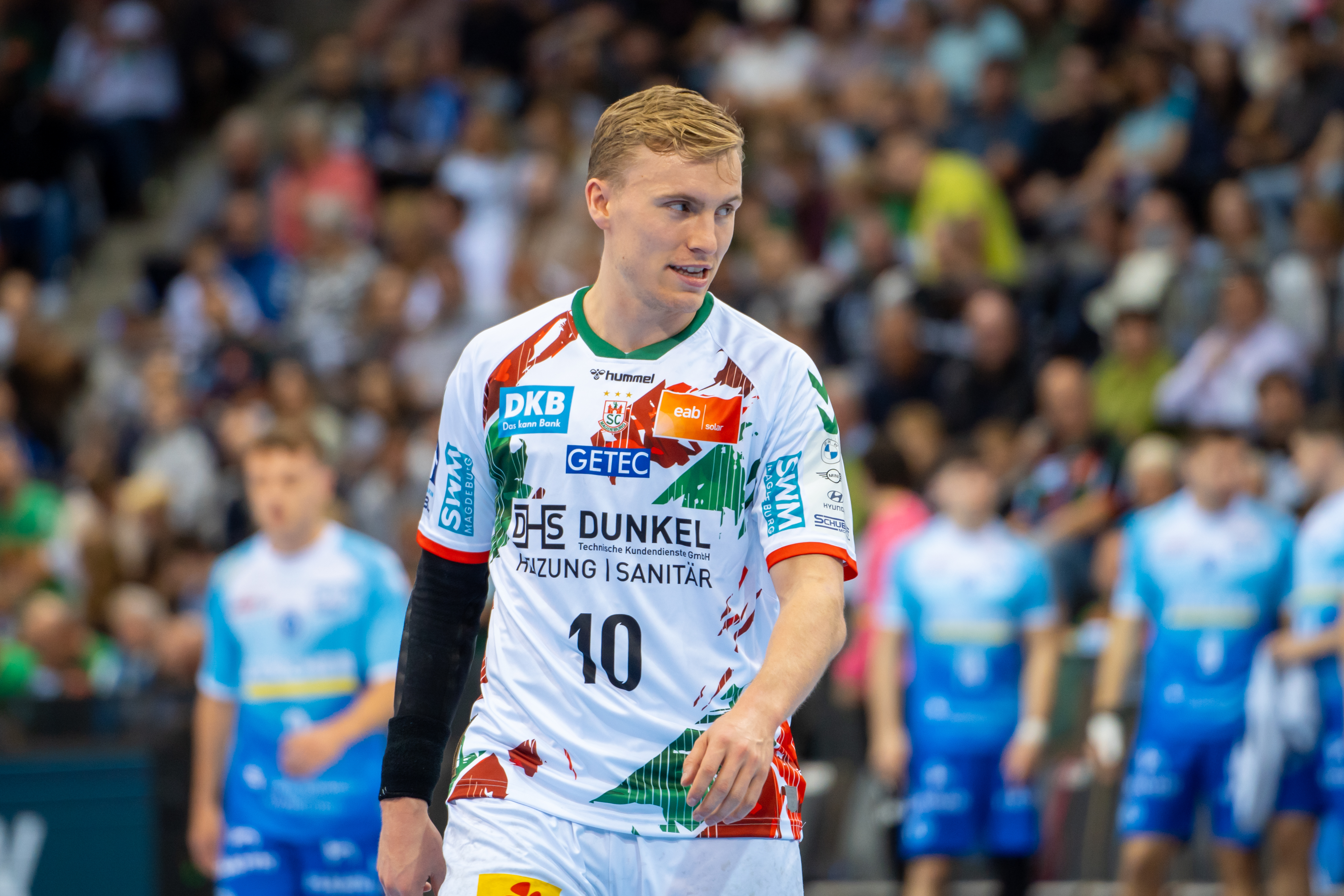

Personal information
- Nationality: Icelandic
- Born: 30 July 1999 (age 27) Reykjavík, Iceland
- Height: 1.91 m (6 ft 3 in)

Sport
- Sport: Handball
- Position: Centre back
- Current club: SC Magdeburg
- Number: 10

Senior clubs
- Years: Team
- 2015–2018: FH
- 2018–2020: THW Kiel
- 2020–: SC Magdeburg
National team
Years	Team	Apps	(Gls)
2017–	Iceland	32	(51)

Gísli Þorgeir Kristjánsson (born 30 July 1999) is an Icelandic handball player who plays for SC Magdeburg and the Icelandic national team. He was named the Icelandic Sportsperson of the Year in 2023.

== Club career ==
Gísli Þorgeir Kristjánsson made his debut for his boyhood club FH in the 2015/2016 season but it wasn't until the next season where he made his breakthrough to the first team. In the summer of 2018 he moved to the German Handball Bundesliga to THW Kiel, where he signed a three-year contract. With Kiel he won the DHB-Pokal in 2019 and became German champion 2020.

In 2020, he transferred to SC Magdeburg. He won the IHF Super Globe 2021, and the 2020–21 EHF European League. In 2022 he got a silver medal in EHF European League, and became German Champion. He also won 2022 IHF Super Globe.

He was awarded MVP of the 2022–23 Handball-Bundesliga, and of the 2022–23 EHF Champions League Final four.

== International career ==
At the U-18 European Championship 2016 in Croatia Gísli was the most successful Icelandic shooter with 53 goals. On 26 October 2017 he made his debut for the Icelandic national team in a 31:29-victory against Sweden in friendly.

At the 2026 European Men's Handball Championship he finished 4th with Iceland, losing to Denmark in the semifinal and Croatia in the third-place playoff. He had the most assists of any player at the tournament with 62.

== Honours ==
- EHF Champions League:
  - Gold: 2023, 2025
- EHF European League:
  - Gold: 2019, 2021
  - Silver: 2022
- Handball-Bundesliga:
  - Gold: 2020, 2022, 2024
- DHB-Pokal:
  - Gold: 2019, 2024
  - Silver: 2022, 2023
- IHF Super Globe:
  - Gold: 2021, 2022, 2023
  - Silver: 2019

Individual awards

- All-Star Centre Back of the European Championship: 2026
- EHF Excellence Awards: Centre Back of the Season 2024/25
- MVP Handball-Bundesliga: 2022–23
- MVP EHF Champions League Final four : 2022–23, 2024-25
- Icelandic Sportsperson of the Year: 2023
- German Handballer des Jahres: 2023

== Football career ==
Before completely focusing on handball he played football as well. In 2014 he was selected for the Iceland squad to compete in the 2014 Summer Youth Olympics. He played two games in the tournament and won a bronze medal with the Icelandic team.

== Personal life ==
His father is Kristján Arason is a former handball player who became German champion with VfL Gummersbach and his mother, Þorgerður Katrín Gunnarsdóttir, is an Icelandic politician who now serves as Minister of foreign affairs and previously as Minister of Education, Science, and Culture and Minister of Fisheries and Agriculture.
