= Manuel Zehnder =

Swiss handball player

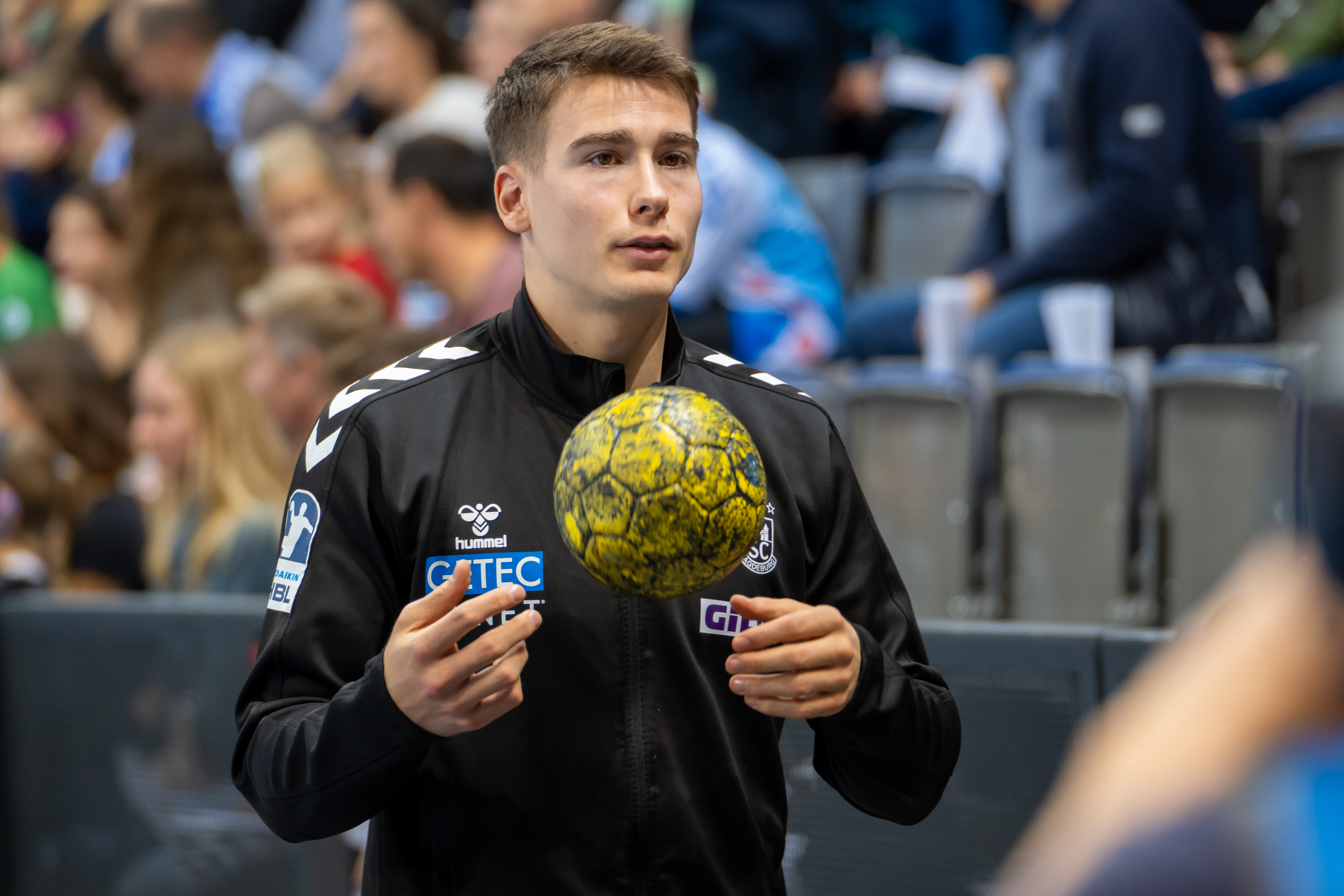

Personal information
- Nationality: Swiss
- Born: 24 October 1999 (age 26) Aarau, Switzerland
- Height: 1.90 m (6 ft 3 in)

Sport
- Sport: Handball
- Position: Centre back
- Current club: SC Magdeburg
- Number: 8

Youth career
- Years: Team
- –: HSC Suhr Aarau

Senior clubs
- Years: Team
- –2022: HSC Suhr Aarau
- 2022–2024: HC Erlangen
- 2023–2024: → ThSV Eisenach
- 2024–2026: SC Magdeburg
- 2026–: GOG Håndbold
National team
Years	Team	Apps	(Gls)
2021–	Switzerland	28	(130)
- Updated on 30 October 2025

Manuel Zehnder is a Swiss handball player who plays for SC Magdeburg and the Switzerland national team.

Zehnder can play left back or centre back, and is known for his goal-scoring ability. Playing a minor role for HC Erlangen in the 2022–23 Handball-Bundesliga, he joined newly promoted Eisenach on loan for the 2023-24 season. This was a successful move, as he was the top goalscorer in the division. He represented his country at the 2024 European Men's Handball Championship.
