= Hákun West Av Teigum =

Faroese handball player (born 2002)

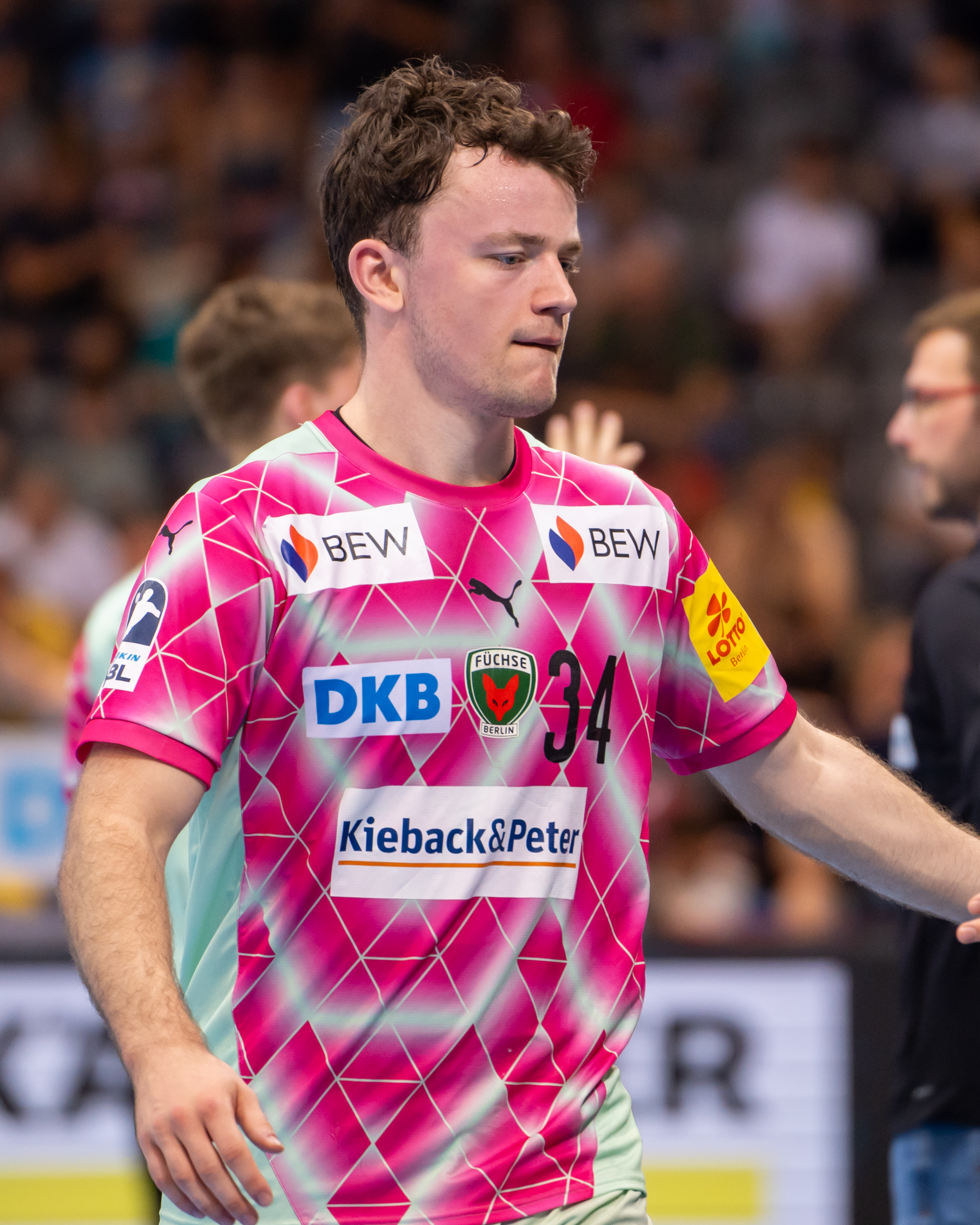

Personal information
- Nationality: Faroese
- Born: 19 February 2002 (age 24) Hoyvík, Faroe Islands
- Height: 1.88 m (6 ft 2 in)

Sport
- Sport: Handball
- Position: Right wing
- Current club: Füchse Berlin
- Number: 34

Youth career
- Years: Team
- –: H71
- –: Skanderborg Aarhus Håndbold

Senior clubs
- Years: Team
- 2020–2023: Skanderborg Aarhus Håndbold
- 2023–: Füchse Berlin
National team
Years	Team	Apps	(Gls)
2021-	Faroe Islands	37	(206)
- Updated on 14 January 2026

Hákun West Av Teigum (born 19 February 2002) is a Faroese handball player for Füchse Berlin and the Faroese national team.

He participated at the 2022 European Under-20 Championship and the 2023 Junior World Championship.

He was part of the Faroese team at their first ever major international tournament; the 2024 European Men's Handball Championship. They did however exit in the preliminary round after 3 defeats.

With Füchse he won the 2024-25 Handball-Bundesliga, which was the first in club history. The same season he played in the 2024-25 EHF Champions League final, where Füchse lost to league rivals SC Magdeburg.

At the 2026 European Men's Handball Championship he was part of the Faroese team that won their first ever match at a major international tournament, when they won 37–24 against Montenegro.

== Individual awards ==
- All-Star team as Best right wing Danish League 2022/23
