= Anders Kragh Martinusen =

Danish handball player (born 1993)

Personal information
- Nationality: Danish
- Born: 18 May 1993 (age 33) Odder, Denmark
- Height: 188 m (617 ft)

Sport
- Sport: Handball
- Position: Right back
- Current club: Fredericia HK
- Number: 93

Youth career
- Years: Team
- –: Odder Håndbold

Senior clubs
- Years: Team
- 2016–2017: Aarhus Håndbold
- 2017: Odder Håndbold
- 2017–2020: Aarhus Håndbold
- 2021–: Fredericia HK
National team
Years	Team	Apps	(Gls)
2016	Denmark	2	(3)

Anders Kragh Martinusen (born 18 May 1993) is a Danish handball player for Fredericia HK in the Danish Men's Handball League and previously the Danish men's national team.

Martinusen made his international debut on the Danish men's national team on 4 November 2016 against Faroe Islands.

In November 2019, he signed a two year-contract with Fredericia HK. In September 2024, he extended his contract with a further three-year deal until the summer of 2027.
