= Miha Zarabec =

Slovenian handball player (born 1991)

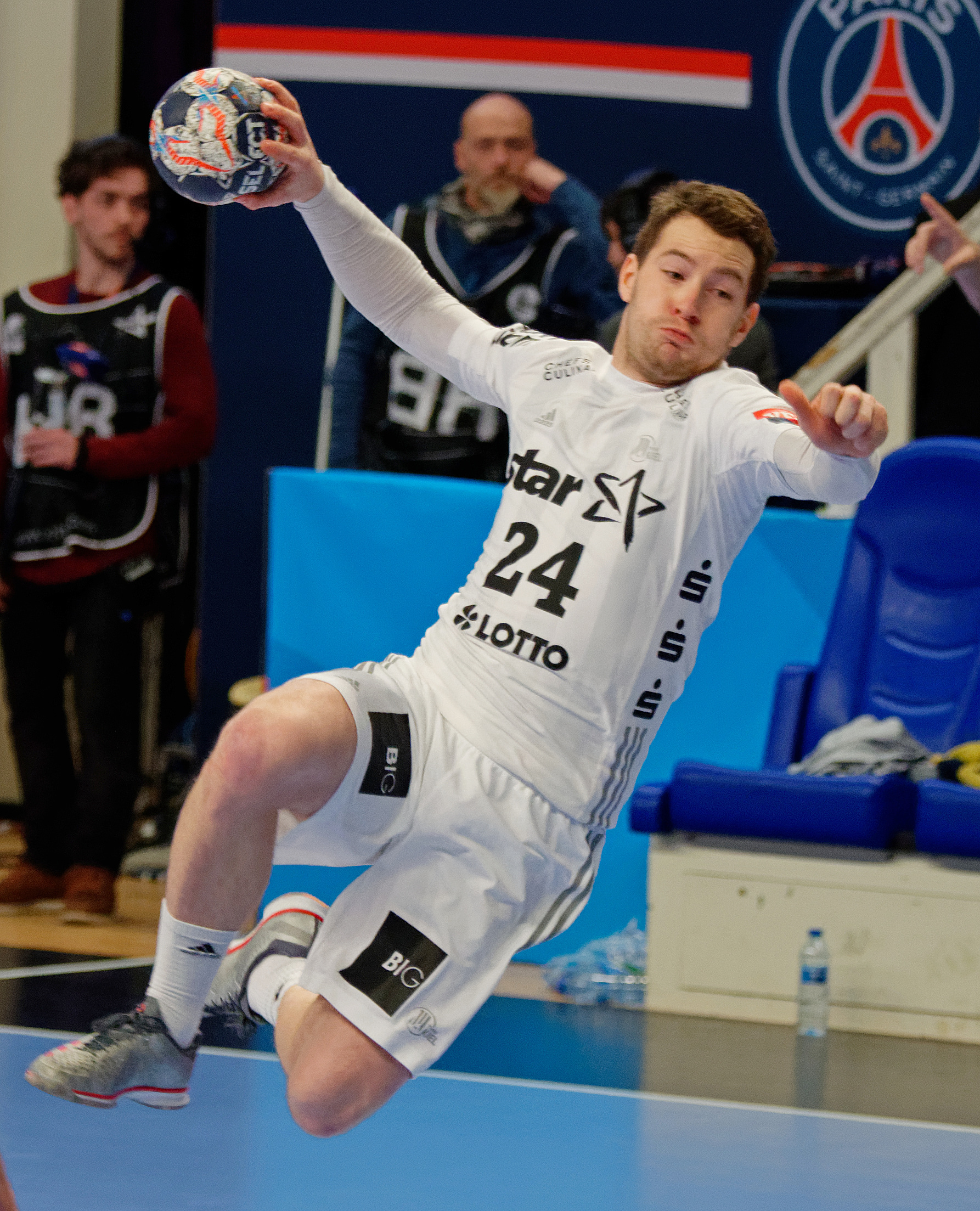
- Zarabec with THW Kiel in 2018

Personal information
- Nationality: Slovenian
- Born: 12 October 1991 (age 35) Novo Mesto, Slovenia
- Height: 1.78 m (5 ft 10 in)

Sport
- Sport: Handball
- Position: Centre back
- Current club: Wisła Płock

Senior clubs
- Years: Team
- 2008–2012: RK Trimo Trebnje
- 2012–2014: RK Maribor Branik
- 2014–2017: RK Celje
- 2017–2023: THW Kiel
- 2023–: Wisła Płock
National team
Years	Team	Apps	(Gls)
2015–	Slovenia	119	(239)
Medal record
World Championship
Bronze medal – third place	2017 France
- Updated on 26 January 2025

Miha Zarabec (born 12 October 1991) is a Slovenian handball player who plays for Wisła Płock and the Slovenia national team.

With Slovenia, he competed at the 2016 European Men's Handball Championship.
