= Dylan Nahi =

French handball player (born 1999)

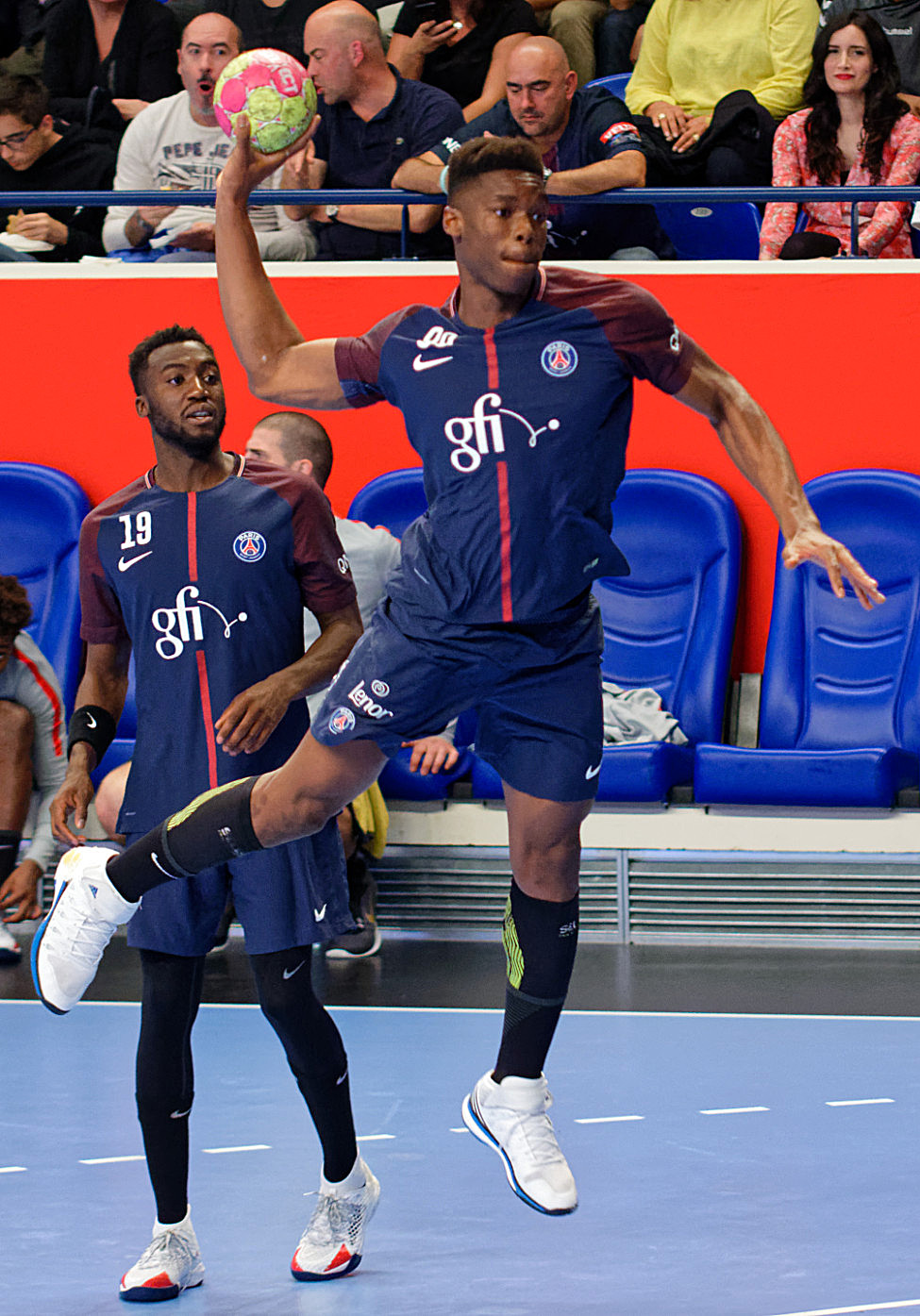

Personal information
- Nationality: French
- Born: 30 November 1999 (age 26) Paris, France
- Height: 1.92 m (6 ft 4 in)

Sport
- Sport: Handball
- Position: Left wing
- Current club: Industria Kielce
- Number: 99

Senior clubs
- Years: Team
- 2016–2021: Paris Saint-Germain
- 2021–: Industria Kielce
National team
| Years | Team | Apps | (Gls) |
| 2017– | France | 79 | (214) |
Medal record
World Championship
| Silver medal – second place | 2023 Poland/Sweden |
| Bronze medal – third place | 2025 Croatia/Denmark/Norway |
European Championship
| Gold medal – first place | 2024 Germany |
Junior World Championship
| Gold medal – first place | 2019 Spain |
Youth World Championship
| Gold medal – first place | 2017 Georgia |
- Updated on 14 January 2026

Dylan Nahi (born 30 November 1999) is a French handball player for Industria Kielce and the French national team.

At the 2025 World Championship he won bronze medals with France, losing to Croatia in the semifinal and beating Portugal in the third place playoff.

== Individual awards ==
- Best Left Wing of the World Championship: 2025
- All-Star Best Young Player of EHF Champions League: 2021
- All-Star Team as best Left wing at the 2018 Junior European Championship
