= Mario Šoštarić =

Slovenian handball player (born 1992)

Personal information
- Nationality: Slovenian/Croatian
- Born: 25 November 1992 (age 33) Slovenj Gradec, Slovenia
- Height: 1.93 m (6 ft 4 in)

Sport
- Sport: Handball
- Position: Right wing
- Current club: SC Pick Szeged
- Number: 24

Senior clubs
- Years: Team
- 2009–2011: RK Gorenje Velenje
- 2011–2013: RK Maribor Branik
- 2013–2016: RK Gorenje Velenje
- 2016–: SC Pick Szeged
National team
Years	Team	Apps	(Gls)
2012–2020	Slovenia	36	(69)
2023–	Croatia		
Medal record
Representing Croatia
World Championship
Silver medal – second place	2025 Croatia/Denmark/Norway
European Championship
Bronze medal – third place	2026 Denmark/Norway/Sweden

Mario Šoštarić (born 25 November 1992) is a professional handball player who plays for SC Pick Szeged. Born in Slovenia, he has represented both Slovenia and Croatia internationally.

Šoštarić started his career with RK Gorenje Velenje, and later played for RK Maribor Branik.

== Honours ==
SC Pick Szeged

- Hungarian Championship: 2017–18, 2020–21, 2021–22
- Hungarian Cup: 2018–19, 2024–25

Individual awards

- Best right wing of the World Championship: 2025
- All-Star Right Wing of the European Championship: 2026
- EHF Excellence Awards: Right Wing of the Season 2024–25
