= Aymeric Minne =

French handball player (born 1997)

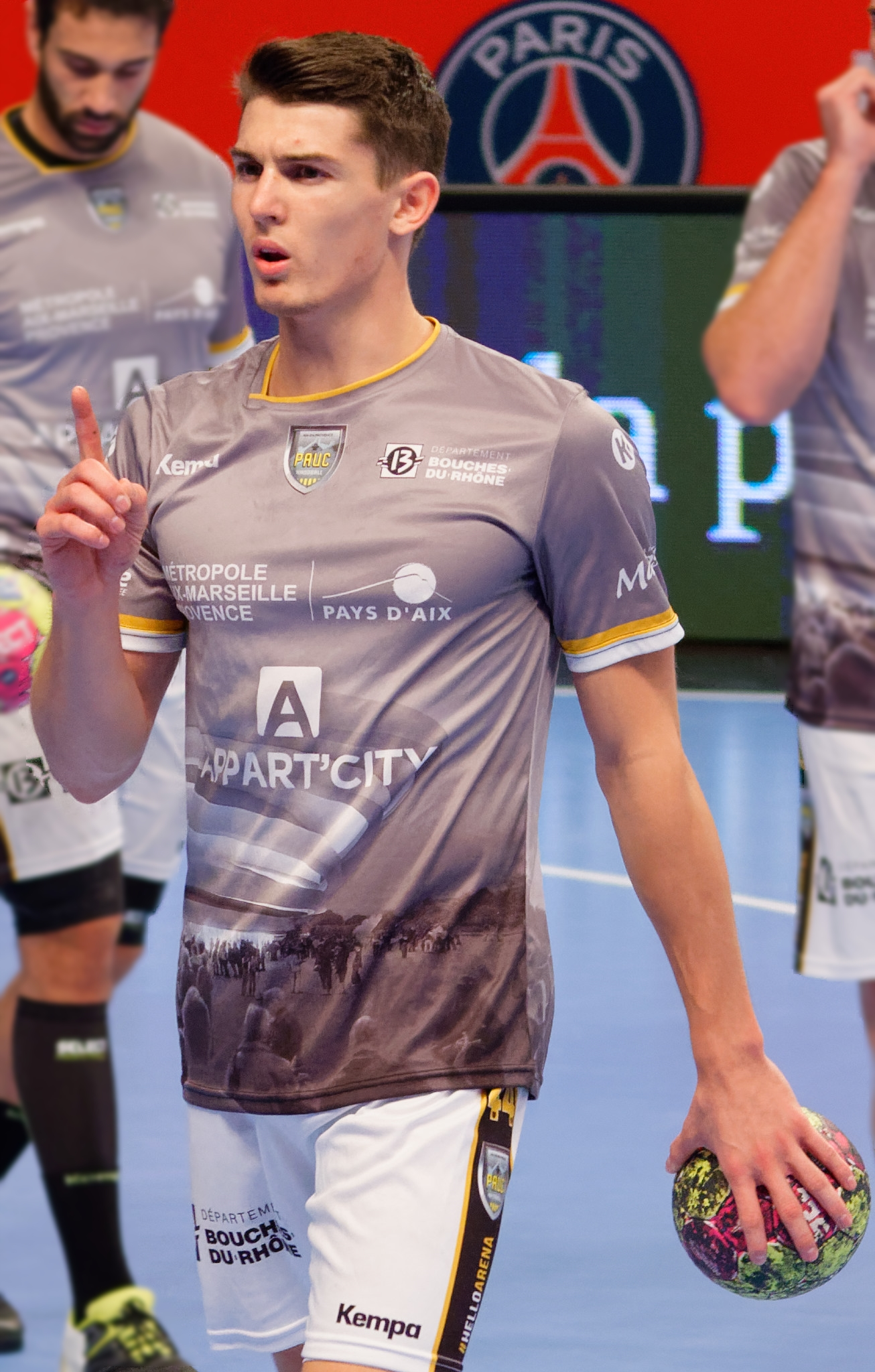

Personal information
- Nationality: French
- Born: 20 April 1997 (age 29) Melun, France
- Height: 1.86 m (6 ft 1 in)

Sport
- Sport: Handball
- Position: Centre back
- Current club: SG Flensburg-Handewitt
- Number: ?

Youth career
- Years: Team
- 2001–2013: Tournefeuille HB
- 2013–2015: Fenix Toulouse

Senior clubs
- Years: Team
- 2015–2019: Pays d'Aix UC
- 2019–2026: HBC Nantes
- 2026–: SG Flensburg-Handewitt
National team
Years	Team	Apps	(Gls)
2021–	France	47	(146)
Medal record
World Championship
Bronze medal – third place	2025 Croatia/Denmark/Norway
- Updated on 14 January 2026

Aymeric Minne (born 20 April 1997) is a French handball player who plays for SG Flensburg-Handewitt and the French national team.

In 2015, he was part of the France team that won the IHF Men's U19 Handball World Championship, playing alongside Ludovic Fabregas, Melvyn Richardson, Benoît Kounkoud and Dika Mem. Minne was the top scorer in the quarter and semi-final matches. In his professional career, he excelled with PAUC, scoring 79 goals in his first season. He joined HBC Nantes in 2019, reaching the EHF FINAL4 in the 2020–21 EHF Champions League. He was selected for the French national team for the first time in 2021, against Greece. He was a part of the squad for the 2022 European Men's Handball Championship but missed the following year's World Championship through injury.

At the 2025 World Championship he won bronze medals with France, losing to Croatia in the semifinal and beating Portugal in the third place playoff. Minne is mainly known for his versatility, speed and long range shooting.
