= Martim Costa =

Portuguese handball player (born 2002)

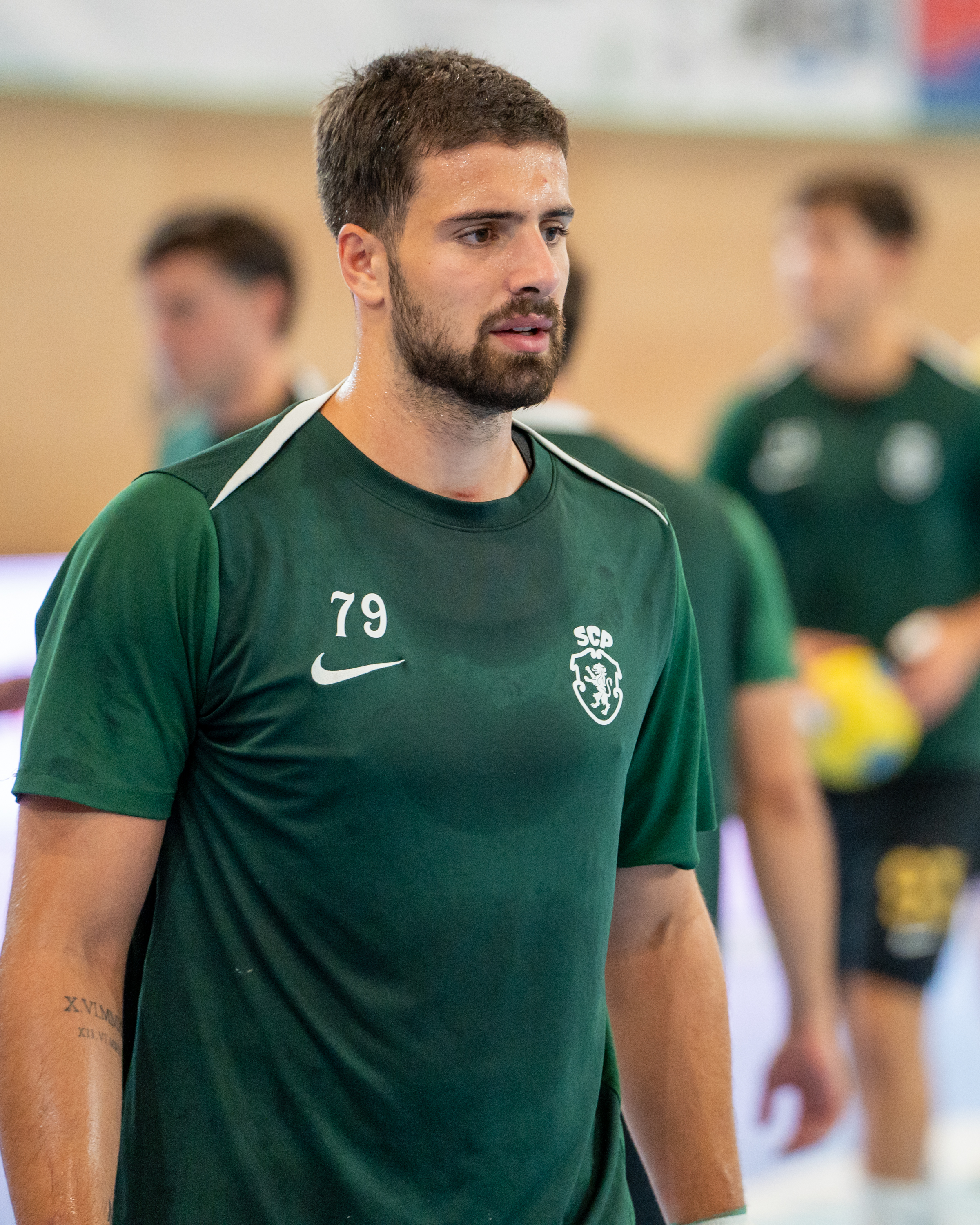

Personal information
- Full name: Martim Mota da Costa
- Born: 27 September 2002 (age 24) Vila Nova de Gaia, Portugal
- Height: 1.88 m (6 ft 2 in)

Sport
- Sport: Handball
- Position: Left back
- Current club: Sporting CP
- Number: 79

Youth career
- Years: Team
- 2011–2017: GD Colégio Internato Carvalhos
- 2017–2018: FC Porto

Senior clubs
- Years: Team
- 2018–2021: FC Porto
- 2018–2020: → FC Gaia (loan)
- 2021–: Sporting CP
National team
Years	Team	Apps	(Gls)
2022–	Portugal	39	(160)
Medal record
Junior European Championship
Silver medal – second place	2022 Portugal
- Updated on 14 January 2026

Martim Mota da Costa (born 27 September 2002) is a Portuguese handball player for Sporting CP and the Portuguese national team.

== Career ==
Costa started playing handball at Colégio dos Carvalhos, a private school south of Porto together with his brother, Francisco Costa.

In 2017 he Switched to FC Portos youth team. Between 2018 and 2020 he was loaned to FC Gaia, a team from his hometown. In his first season he won the Portuguese second division, scoring 227 in 30 matches and was promoted to Andebol 1. In his second season, his first in the top flight, he scored 225 goals in 26 matches.

In the 2020/2021 he played for the Porto first team, where he won the Portuguese Championship and the Portuguese Supercup.

After a season at Porto he joined Sporting CP, which was coached by his father, Ricardo Costa. His brother also played at the club. Here he won the Portuguese Cup in 2022, 2023 and 2024 and the Portuguese Supercup in 2023, and the Portuguese championship in 2024.

=== National team ===
Costa debuted for the Portuguese national team in a World Cup qualification match against Netherlands. After losing the home match 30:33, Costa lead his team to an 35:28 win, scoring 10 goals and securing the qualification. His brother debuted in the same match.

His first major international tournament was the 2023 World Men's Handball Championship, where Portugal finished 13th.

At the 2024 European Men's Handball Championship he was joint top scorer, together with Danish Mathias Gidsel, with 54 goals. Portugal finished 7th at the tournament.

At the 2025 World Championship he scored the winning goal against Germany with 5 seconds left in extra time to take Portugal to their first ever World Championship semifinal. They lost the semifinals to Denmark and the third place playoff to France. At the 2026 European Men's Handball Championship he was part of the Portugal team that got 5th place, their best ever finish at a European Championship.

== Honours ==
Porto

- Portuguese League
  - Champion: 2020–21
- Portuguese Cup
  - Winner: 2020–21

Sporting CP

- Portuguese League
  - Champion: 2023–24
- Portuguese Cup
  - Winner: 2021–22, 2022–23, 2023–24
- Portuguese Super Cup
  - Winner: 2023, 2024

== Individual awards ==
- All-Star centre back of the World Championship: 2025
- All-Star left back of the European Championship: 2024
- Top scorer of the European Championship: 2024 (54 goals)
- All-Star left back of the European Under-20 Championship: 2022
- All-Star right back of the Youth World Championship: 2019

== Personal life ==
He is the older brother of handball player Francisco Costa. His father, Ricardo Costa, is a former handball player and the coach of Sporting CP.
