= 2026–27 EHF Champions League group stage =

The 2026–27 EHF Champions League group stage was played between 9 September and 29 October 2026 to determine the twelve teams advancing to the main round of the 2026–27 EHF Champions League.

== Format ==
The 24 teams were split into six groups of four teams and played a round-robin with home and away matches. The top two-placed teams advanced to the main round.

== Draw ==
The draw took place on 26 June 2026.

=== Seeding ===
The seeding was announced on 25 June 2026.

| Pot 1 | Pot 2 | Pot 3 | Pot 4 |
|---|---|---|---|
| (Denmark) Aalborg Håndbold (Spain) Barça (France) HBC Nantes (Germany) SC Magdeburg (Hungary) One Veszprém HC (Portugal) Sporting CP | (France) Montpellier Handball (France) Paris Saint-Germain (Germany) Füchse Berlin (Germany) MT Melsungen (Hungary) OTP Bank – Pick Szeged (Poland) Industria Kielce | (Croatia) HC Zagreb (Denmark) GOG (Norway) Kolstad Handball (Poland) Orlen Wisła Płock (Portugal) FC Porto (Romania) CS Dinamo București | (Denmark) SAH Aarhus (North Macedonia) HC Vardar 1961 (Slovenia) RK Celje Pivovarna Laško (Serbia) RK Partizan AdmiralBet (Switzerland) HC Kriens-Luzern (Sweden) IFK Kristianstad |

== Tiebreakers ==
In the group stage, teams were ranked according to points (2 points for a win, 1 point for a draw, 0 points for a loss). After completion of the group stage, if two or more teams had the same number of points, the ranking were determined as follows:

1. Highest number of points in matches between the teams directly involved;
2. Superior goal difference in matches between the teams directly involved;
3. Highest number of goals scored in matches between the teams directly involved;
4. Superior goal difference in all matches of the group;
5. Highest number of plus goals in all matches of the group;

If the ranking of one of these teams was determined, the above criteria was consecutively followed until the ranking of all teams was determined. If no ranking could have been determined, a decision shall be obtained by EHF through drawing of lots.

== Schedule ==
The group stage was played between 9 September and 29 October 2026.

| Round | Dates |
|---|---|
| Round 1 | 9–19 September 2026 |
| Round 2 | 16–17 September 2026 |
| Round 3 | 7–8 October 2026 |
| Round 4 | 14–15 October 2026 |
| Round 5 | 21–22 October 2026 |
| Round 6 | 28–29 October 2026 |

== Groups ==
Times up to 17 October 2026 UTC+2, times after are UTC+1.

=== Group A ===
| Pos | Team | Pld | W | D | L | GF | GA | GD | Pts | Qualification |
|---|---|---|---|---|---|---|---|---|---|---|
| 1 | (Hungary) One Veszprém HC | 6 | 6 | 0 | 0 | 219 | 175 | +44 | 12 | Main round |
| 2 | (Germany) Füchse Berlin | 6 | 4 | 0 | 2 | 224 | 205 | +19 | 8 | Main round |
| 3 | (Portugal) FC Porto | 6 | 1 | 1 | 4 | 187 | 207 | −20 | 3 | Transfer to EHF European League |
| 4 | (Serbia) RK Partizan AdmiralBet | 6 | 0 | 1 | 5 | 181 | 224 | −43 | 1 | Transfer to EHF European League |

Source: EHF
Rules for classification: Tiebreakers

| 9 September 2026; 18:45 | One Veszprém HC (Hungary) | 36–28 | (Portugal) FC Porto | Veszprém Aréna, Veszprém; Attendance: 3,815; Referees: Rawicki, Fabryczny (POL) |
| 9 September 2026; 18:45 | Descat, Remili 7 | (15–14) | Borges 7 | Veszprém Aréna, Veszprém; Attendance: 3,815; Referees: Rawicki, Fabryczny (POL) |
| 9 September 2026; 18:45 | 5× (suspension) | Report | 4× (suspension) | Veszprém Aréna, Veszprém; Attendance: 3,815; Referees: Rawicki, Fabryczny (POL) |

| 10 September 2026; 18:45 | RK Partizan AdmiralBet (Serbia) | 33–44 | (Germany) Füchse Berlin | Aleksandar Nikolić Hall, Belgrade; Attendance: 4,215; Referees: Budzák, Záhradník (SVK) |
| 10 September 2026; 18:45 | three players 6 | (15–23) | Gidsel 9 | Aleksandar Nikolić Hall, Belgrade; Attendance: 4,215; Referees: Budzák, Záhradník (SVK) |
| 10 September 2026; 18:45 | 1× (yellow card) 2× (suspension) | Report | 1× (yellow card) 2× (suspension) | Aleksandar Nikolić Hall, Belgrade; Attendance: 4,215; Referees: Budzák, Záhradník (SVK) |

| 16 September 2026; 20:45 | Füchse Berlin (Germany) | 29–35 | (Hungary) One Veszprém HC | Max-Schmeling-Halle, Berlin; Attendance: 7,732; Referees: Pavićević, Ražnatović (MNE) |
| 16 September 2026; 20:45 | Gidsel 10 | (16–21) | Descat 9 | Max-Schmeling-Halle, Berlin; Attendance: 7,732; Referees: Pavićević, Ražnatović (MNE) |
| 16 September 2026; 20:45 | 1× (yellow card) 3× (suspension) | Report | 1× (yellow card) 7× (suspension) | Max-Schmeling-Halle, Berlin; Attendance: 7,732; Referees: Pavićević, Ražnatović (MNE) |

| 17 September 2026; 20:45 | FC Porto (Portugal) | 32–28 | (Serbia) RK Partizan AdmiralBet | Dragão Arena, Porto; Attendance: 1,001; Referees: Gasmi, Gasmi (FRA) |
| 17 September 2026; 20:45 | Martínez 8 | (17–14) | Lumbroso 7 | Dragão Arena, Porto; Attendance: 1,001; Referees: Gasmi, Gasmi (FRA) |
| 17 September 2026; 20:45 | 1× (yellow card) 4× (suspension) | Report | 3× (suspension) | Dragão Arena, Porto; Attendance: 1,001; Referees: Gasmi, Gasmi (FRA) |

| 7 October 2026; 18:45 | RK Partizan AdmiralBet (Serbia) | 26–37 | (Hungary) One Veszprém HC | Aleksandar Nikolić Hall, Belgrade; Attendance: 2,265; Referees: Kull, Tint (EST) |
| 7 October 2026; 18:45 | Kulesh 6 | (12–17) | Martinović 6 | Aleksandar Nikolić Hall, Belgrade; Attendance: 2,265; Referees: Kull, Tint (EST) |
| 7 October 2026; 18:45 | 2× (suspension) | Report | 3× (suspension) | Aleksandar Nikolić Hall, Belgrade; Attendance: 2,265; Referees: Kull, Tint (EST) |

| 8 October 2026; 18:45 | Füchse Berlin (Germany) | 40–32 | (Portugal) FC Porto | Max-Schmeling-Halle, Berlin; Attendance: 8,017; Referees: Cindrić, Gonzurek (CRO) |
| 8 October 2026; 18:45 | Gidsel 17 | (20–17) | Martínez 6 | Max-Schmeling-Halle, Berlin; Attendance: 8,017; Referees: Cindrić, Gonzurek (CRO) |
| 8 October 2026; 18:45 | 1× (yellow card) 2× (suspension) | Report | 1× (yellow card) 5× (suspension) | Max-Schmeling-Halle, Berlin; Attendance: 8,017; Referees: Cindrić, Gonzurek (CRO) |

| 14 October 2026; 18:45 | One Veszprém HC (Hungary) | 38–28 | (Serbia) RK Partizan AdmiralBet | Veszprém Aréna, Veszprém; Attendance: 3,800; Referees: Pîrvu, Potîrniche (ROU) |
| 14 October 2026; 18:45 | Pechmalbec 8 | (18–15) | Wagner 9 | Veszprém Aréna, Veszprém; Attendance: 3,800; Referees: Pîrvu, Potîrniche (ROU) |
| 14 October 2026; 18:45 | 3× (suspension) | Report | 2× (suspension) 1× (red card) | Veszprém Aréna, Veszprém; Attendance: 3,800; Referees: Pîrvu, Potîrniche (ROU) |

| 15 October 2026; 20:45 | FC Porto (Portugal) | 33–36 | (Germany) Füchse Berlin | Dragão Arena, Porto; Attendance: 1,682; Referees: Pétursson, Þrastarson (ISL) |
| 15 October 2026; 20:45 | V. Costa 8 | (18–19) | Freihöfer 15 | Dragão Arena, Porto; Attendance: 1,682; Referees: Pétursson, Þrastarson (ISL) |
| 15 October 2026; 20:45 | 2× (yellow card) 6× (suspension) | Report | 1× (yellow card) 5× (suspension) | Dragão Arena, Porto; Attendance: 1,682; Referees: Pétursson, Þrastarson (ISL) |

| 21 October 2026; 18:45 | One Veszprém HC (Hungary) | 39–35 | (Germany) Füchse Berlin | Veszprém Aréna, Veszprém; Attendance: 5,090; Referees: García, Marín (ESP) |
| 21 October 2026; 18:45 | Pechmalbec 8 | (20–13) | Gidsel 9 | Veszprém Aréna, Veszprém; Attendance: 5,090; Referees: García, Marín (ESP) |
| 21 October 2026; 18:45 | 1× (suspension) | Report | 1× (yellow card) 3× (suspension) 1× (red card) | Veszprém Aréna, Veszprém; Attendance: 5,090; Referees: García, Marín (ESP) |

| 21 October 2026; 18:45 | RK Partizan AdmiralBet (Serbia) | 33–33 | (Portugal) FC Porto | Aleksandar Nikolić Hall, Belgrade; Attendance: 2,200; Referees: Covalciuc, Covalciuc (MDA) |
| 21 October 2026; 18:45 | Crnoglavac 8 | (14–16) | Cardoso 6 | Aleksandar Nikolić Hall, Belgrade; Attendance: 2,200; Referees: Covalciuc, Covalciuc (MDA) |
| 21 October 2026; 18:45 | 3× (suspension) | Report | 1× (yellow card) 3× (suspension) 1× (red card) | Aleksandar Nikolić Hall, Belgrade; Attendance: 2,200; Referees: Covalciuc, Covalciuc (MDA) |

| 28 October 2026; 18:45 | FC Porto (Portugal) | 29–34 | (Hungary) One Veszprém HC | Dragão Arena, Porto; Attendance: 1,230; Referees: Mitrevski, Todorovski (MKD) |
| 28 October 2026; 18:45 | Martínez 6 | (15–17) | Hesham, Remili 5 | Dragão Arena, Porto; Attendance: 1,230; Referees: Mitrevski, Todorovski (MKD) |
| 28 October 2026; 18:45 | 4× (suspension) | Report | 1× (suspension) 1× (red card) | Dragão Arena, Porto; Attendance: 1,230; Referees: Mitrevski, Todorovski (MKD) |

| 29 October 2026; 18:45 | Füchse Berlin (Germany) | 40–33 | (Serbia) RK Partizan AdmiralBet | Max-Schmeling-Halle, Berlin; Attendance: 5,621; Referees: Bolic, Hurich (AUT) |
| 29 October 2026; 18:45 | Gidsel 12 | (17–18) | Wagner 6 | Max-Schmeling-Halle, Berlin; Attendance: 5,621; Referees: Bolic, Hurich (AUT) |
| 29 October 2026; 18:45 | 3× (suspension) | Report | 2× (suspension) | Max-Schmeling-Halle, Berlin; Attendance: 5,621; Referees: Bolic, Hurich (AUT) |

=== Group B ===
| Pos | Team | Pld | W | D | L | GF | GA | GD | Pts | Qualification |
|---|---|---|---|---|---|---|---|---|---|---|
| 1 | (Poland) Orlen Wisła Płock | 6 | 4 | 0 | 2 | 174 | 163 | +11 | 8 | Main round |
| 2 | (Germany) MT Melsungen | 6 | 3 | 1 | 2 | 164 | 164 | 0 | 7 | Main round |
| 3 | (France) HBC Nantes | 6 | 3 | 0 | 3 | 169 | 176 | −7 | 6 | Transfer to EHF European League |
| 4 | (North Macedonia) HC Vardar 1961 | 6 | 1 | 1 | 4 | 180 | 184 | −4 | 3 | Transfer to EHF European League |

Source: EHF
Rules for classification: Tiebreakers

| 9 September 2026; 20:45 | HBC Nantes (France) | 26–25 | (Poland) Orlen Wisła Płock | Palais des Sports de Beaulieu, Nantes; Attendance: 5,902; Referees: García, Marín (ESP) |
| 9 September 2026; 20:45 | Tarrafeta 9 | (11–11) | Dawydzik 7 | Palais des Sports de Beaulieu, Nantes; Attendance: 5,902; Referees: García, Marín (ESP) |
| 9 September 2026; 20:45 | 2× (yellow card) 2× (suspension) | Report | 1× (yellow card) 4× (suspension) 1× (red card) | Palais des Sports de Beaulieu, Nantes; Attendance: 5,902; Referees: García, Marín (ESP) |

| 10 September 2026; 20:45 | MT Melsungen (Germany) | 33–31 | (North Macedonia) HC Vardar 1961 | Rothenbach-Halle, Kassel; Attendance: 2,437; Referees: Hansen, Madsen (DEN) |
| 10 September 2026; 20:45 | Drosten, Golla 5 | (16–15) | Vorkapić 9 | Rothenbach-Halle, Kassel; Attendance: 2,437; Referees: Hansen, Madsen (DEN) |
| 10 September 2026; 20:45 | 1× (yellow card) 2× (suspension) | Report | 2× (yellow card) 3× (suspension) | Rothenbach-Halle, Kassel; Attendance: 2,437; Referees: Hansen, Madsen (DEN) |

| 16 September 2026; 18:45 | HC Vardar 1961 (North Macedonia) | 32–33 | (France) HBC Nantes | Jane Sandanski Arena, Skopje; Attendance: 5,000; Referees: Horváth, Marton (HUN) |
| 16 September 2026; 18:45 | Abdelhak 10 | (15–16) | Leopold 13 | Jane Sandanski Arena, Skopje; Attendance: 5,000; Referees: Horváth, Marton (HUN) |
| 16 September 2026; 18:45 | 2× (yellow card) 4× (suspension) | Report | 1× (yellow card) 3× (suspension) | Jane Sandanski Arena, Skopje; Attendance: 5,000; Referees: Horváth, Marton (HUN) |

| 17 September 2026; 18:45 | Orlen Wisła Płock (Poland) | 25–24 | (Germany) MT Melsungen | Orlen Arena, Płock; Attendance: 3,652; Referees: Jørum, Kleven (NOR) |
| 17 September 2026; 18:45 | Bjerre 9 | (13–15) | Stefánsson 7 | Orlen Arena, Płock; Attendance: 3,652; Referees: Jørum, Kleven (NOR) |
| 17 September 2026; 18:45 | 1× (yellow card) 2× (suspension) | Report | 1× (yellow card) 3× (suspension) | Orlen Arena, Płock; Attendance: 3,652; Referees: Jørum, Kleven (NOR) |

| 8 October 2026; 20:45 | MT Melsungen (Germany) | 28–23 | (France) HBC Nantes | Rothenbach-Halle, Kassel; Attendance: 3,446; Referees: Boričić, Marković (SRB) |
| 8 October 2026; 20:45 | Drosten 6 | (14–11) | Tournat 6 | Rothenbach-Halle, Kassel; Attendance: 3,446; Referees: Boričić, Marković (SRB) |
| 8 October 2026; 20:45 | 1× (yellow card) 2× (suspension) | Report | 1× (yellow card) 2× (suspension) | Rothenbach-Halle, Kassel; Attendance: 3,446; Referees: Boričić, Marković (SRB) |

| 8 October 2026; 20:45 | HC Vardar 1961 (North Macedonia) | 26–32 | (Poland) Orlen Wisła Płock | Jane Sandanski Arena, Skopje; Attendance: 5,000; Referees: Covalciuc, Covalciuc (MDA) |
| 8 October 2026; 20:45 | Fadhuile 14 | (13–15) | Bjerre 10 | Jane Sandanski Arena, Skopje; Attendance: 5,000; Referees: Covalciuc, Covalciuc (MDA) |
| 8 October 2026; 20:45 | 2× (suspension) | Report | 5× (suspension) | Jane Sandanski Arena, Skopje; Attendance: 5,000; Referees: Covalciuc, Covalciuc (MDA) |

| 14 October 2026; 20:45 | Orlen Wisła Płock (Poland) | 33–32 | (North Macedonia) HC Vardar 1961 | Orlen Arena, Płock; Attendance: 3,420; Referees: Barysas, Petrusis (LTU) |
| 14 October 2026; 20:45 | Bjerre 7 | (16–13) | Malus 9 | Orlen Arena, Płock; Attendance: 3,420; Referees: Barysas, Petrusis (LTU) |
| 14 October 2026; 20:45 | 3× (suspension) | Report | 2× (yellow card) 4× (suspension) 1× (red card) | Orlen Arena, Płock; Attendance: 3,420; Referees: Barysas, Petrusis (LTU) |

| 14 October 2026; 20:45 | HBC Nantes (France) | 33–25 | (Germany) MT Melsungen | Palais des Sports de Beaulieu, Nantes; Attendance: 5,900; Referees: Pavićević, Ražnatović (MNE) |
| 14 October 2026; 20:45 | Briet 7 | (17–10) | Mensing 7 | Palais des Sports de Beaulieu, Nantes; Attendance: 5,900; Referees: Pavićević, Ražnatović (MNE) |
| 14 October 2026; 20:45 | 1× (yellow card) 2× (suspension) 1× (red card) | Report | 3× (suspension) | Palais des Sports de Beaulieu, Nantes; Attendance: 5,900; Referees: Pavićević, Ražnatović (MNE) |

| 21 October 2026; 20:45 | HBC Nantes (France) | 27–33 | (North Macedonia) HC Vardar 1961 | Palais des Sports de Beaulieu, Nantes; Attendance: 5,902; Referees: Kurtagic, Wetterwik (SWE) |
| 21 October 2026; 20:45 | Perić, Turchenko 4 | (13–16) | Ljevar 7 | Palais des Sports de Beaulieu, Nantes; Attendance: 5,902; Referees: Kurtagic, Wetterwik (SWE) |
| 21 October 2026; 20:45 | | Report | 2× (suspension) | Palais des Sports de Beaulieu, Nantes; Attendance: 5,902; Referees: Kurtagic, Wetterwik (SWE) |

| 22 October 2026; 18:45 | MT Melsungen (Germany) | 28–26 | (Poland) Orlen Wisła Płock | Rothenbach-Halle, Kassel; Attendance: 4,174; Referees: Lah, Sok (SLO) |
| 22 October 2026; 18:45 | Balenciaga, Mensing 6 | (15–14) | Bjerre, Kosorotov 4 | Rothenbach-Halle, Kassel; Attendance: 4,174; Referees: Lah, Sok (SLO) |
| 22 October 2026; 18:45 | 5× (suspension) | Report | 2× (yellow card) 6× (suspension) 1× (red card) | Rothenbach-Halle, Kassel; Attendance: 4,174; Referees: Lah, Sok (SLO) |

| 28 October 2026; 18:45 | Orlen Wisła Płock (Poland) | 33–27 | (France) HBC Nantes | Orlen Arena, Płock; Attendance: 4,466; Referees: Hansen, Madsen (DEN) |
| 28 October 2026; 18:45 | Bjerre 7 | (15–13) | Leopold 10 | Orlen Arena, Płock; Attendance: 4,466; Referees: Hansen, Madsen (DEN) |
| 28 October 2026; 18:45 | 1× (yellow card) 5× (suspension) | Report | 1× (yellow card) 3× (suspension) | Orlen Arena, Płock; Attendance: 4,466; Referees: Hansen, Madsen (DEN) |

| 28 October 2026; 18:45 | HC Vardar 1961 (North Macedonia) | 26–26 | (Germany) MT Melsungen | Jane Sandanski Arena, Skopje; Attendance: 3,500; Referees: Martins, Martins (POR) |
| 28 October 2026; 18:45 | Fadhuile 7 | (14–12) | Stehl 8 | Jane Sandanski Arena, Skopje; Attendance: 3,500; Referees: Martins, Martins (POR) |
| 28 October 2026; 18:45 | 1× (yellow card) 5× (suspension) 1× (red card) | Report | 2× (yellow card) 2× (suspension) | Jane Sandanski Arena, Skopje; Attendance: 3,500; Referees: Martins, Martins (POR) |

=== Group C ===
| Pos | Team | Pld | W | D | L | GF | GA | GD | Pts | Qualification |
|---|---|---|---|---|---|---|---|---|---|---|
| 1 | (France) Paris Saint-Germain | 6 | 4 | 1 | 1 | 214 | 182 | +32 | 9 (Note: Paris Saint-Germain 65–58 Aalborg Håndbold) | Main round |
| 2 | (Denmark) Aalborg Håndbold | 6 | 4 | 1 | 1 | 195 | 177 | +18 | 9 | Main round |
| 3 | (Croatia) HC Zagreb | 6 | 3 | 0 | 3 | 184 | 190 | −6 | 6 | Transfer to EHF European League |
| 4 | (Slovenia) RK Celje Pivovarna Laško | 6 | 0 | 0 | 6 | 182 | 226 | −44 | 0 | Transfer to EHF European League |

Source: EHF
Rules for classification: Tiebreakers
Notes:

| 9 September 2026; 18:45 | Aalborg Håndbold (Denmark) | 33–33 | (France) Paris Saint-Germain | Gigantium, Aalborg; Attendance: 5,500; Referees: Schulze, Tönnies (GER) |
| 9 September 2026; 18:45 | Hangaard, Knorr 7 | (16–18) | Solé 10 | Gigantium, Aalborg; Attendance: 5,500; Referees: Schulze, Tönnies (GER) |
| 9 September 2026; 18:45 | 3× (suspension) | Report | 1× (yellow card) 4× (suspension) | Gigantium, Aalborg; Attendance: 5,500; Referees: Schulze, Tönnies (GER) |

| 9 September 2026; 18:45 | HC Zagreb (Croatia) | 31–29 | (Slovenia) RK Celje Pivovarna Laško | Arena Zagreb, Zagreb; Attendance: 4,831; Referees: Mitrevski, Todorovski (MKD) |
| 9 September 2026; 18:45 | Bialiauski 9 | (14–12) | Anžič 11 | Arena Zagreb, Zagreb; Attendance: 4,831; Referees: Mitrevski, Todorovski (MKD) |
| 9 September 2026; 18:45 | 1× (yellow card) 7× (suspension) 1× (red card) | Report | 1× (yellow card) 5× (suspension) | Arena Zagreb, Zagreb; Attendance: 4,831; Referees: Mitrevski, Todorovski (MKD) |

| 16 September 2026; 20:45 | Paris Saint-Germain (France) | 34–30 | (Croatia) HC Zagreb | Stade Pierre de Coubertin, Paris; Attendance: 2,915; Referees: Covalciuc, Covalciuc (MDA) |
| 16 September 2026; 20:45 | Omar 10 | (18–17) | Bialiauski 6 | Stade Pierre de Coubertin, Paris; Attendance: 2,915; Referees: Covalciuc, Covalciuc (MDA) |
| 16 September 2026; 20:45 | 1× (suspension) | Report | 1× (suspension) | Stade Pierre de Coubertin, Paris; Attendance: 2,915; Referees: Covalciuc, Covalciuc (MDA) |

| 17 September 2026; 18:45 | RK Celje Pivovarna Laško (Slovenia) | 26–36 | (Denmark) Aalborg Håndbold | Zlatorog Arena, Celje; Attendance: 2,988; Referees: Bolic, Hurich (AUT) |
| 17 September 2026; 18:45 | Milićević 7 | (16–19) | Nielsen 13 | Zlatorog Arena, Celje; Attendance: 2,988; Referees: Bolic, Hurich (AUT) |
| 17 September 2026; 18:45 | 2× (suspension) | Report | 3× (suspension) | Zlatorog Arena, Celje; Attendance: 2,988; Referees: Bolic, Hurich (AUT) |

| 7 October 2026; 20:45 | Paris Saint-Germain (France) | 46–35 | (Slovenia) RK Celje Pivovarna Laško | Stade Pierre de Coubertin, Paris; Attendance: 2,693; Referees: Balvan, Praštalo (BIH) |
| 7 October 2026; 20:45 | Elísson, Prandi 7 | (25–16) | Anžič 9 | Stade Pierre de Coubertin, Paris; Attendance: 2,693; Referees: Balvan, Praštalo (BIH) |
| 7 October 2026; 20:45 | 2× (suspension) | Report | 1× (suspension) | Stade Pierre de Coubertin, Paris; Attendance: 2,693; Referees: Balvan, Praštalo (BIH) |

| 8 October 2026; 18:45 | HC Zagreb (Croatia) | 23–33 | (Denmark) Aalborg Håndbold | Arena Zagreb, Zagreb; Attendance: 6,175; Referees: Bíró, Kiss (HUN) |
| 8 October 2026; 18:45 | Glavaš 10 | (12–17) | Knorr 6 | Arena Zagreb, Zagreb; Attendance: 6,175; Referees: Bíró, Kiss (HUN) |
| 8 October 2026; 18:45 | 3× (suspension) | Report | 3× (suspension) | Arena Zagreb, Zagreb; Attendance: 6,175; Referees: Bíró, Kiss (HUN) |

| 14 October 2026; 18:45 | Aalborg Håndbold (Denmark) | 34–33 | (Croatia) HC Zagreb | Gigantium, Aalborg; Attendance: 5,500; Referees: Weijmans, Wolbertus (NED) |
| 14 October 2026; 18:45 | three players 6 | (19–15) | Glavaš 7 | Gigantium, Aalborg; Attendance: 5,500; Referees: Weijmans, Wolbertus (NED) |
| 14 October 2026; 18:45 | 1× (suspension) | Report | 3× (suspension) 2× (red card) | Gigantium, Aalborg; Attendance: 5,500; Referees: Weijmans, Wolbertus (NED) |

| 14 October 2026; 18:45 | RK Celje Pivovarna Laško (Slovenia) | 30–41 | (France) Paris Saint-Germain | Zlatorog Arena, Celje; Attendance: 3,744; Referees: Antić, Jakovljević (SRB) |
| 14 October 2026; 18:45 | Anžič 9 | (14–22) | Syprzak 9 | Zlatorog Arena, Celje; Attendance: 3,744; Referees: Antić, Jakovljević (SRB) |
| 14 October 2026; 18:45 | 1× (yellow card) 2× (suspension) | Report | 4× (suspension) | Zlatorog Arena, Celje; Attendance: 3,744; Referees: Antić, Jakovljević (SRB) |

| 21 October 2026; 18:45 | HC Zagreb (Croatia) | 29–28 | (France) Paris Saint-Germain | Arena Zagreb, Zagreb; Attendance: 7,280; Referees: Budzák, Záhradník (SVK) |
| 21 October 2026; 18:45 | Bialiauski 8 | (13–17) | Solé 10 | Arena Zagreb, Zagreb; Attendance: 7,280; Referees: Budzák, Záhradník (SVK) |
| 21 October 2026; 18:45 | 3× (suspension) | Report | 2× (suspension) | Arena Zagreb, Zagreb; Attendance: 7,280; Referees: Budzák, Záhradník (SVK) |

| 21 October 2026; 20:45 | Aalborg Håndbold (Denmark) | 34–30 | (Slovenia) RK Celje Pivovarna Laško | Gigantium, Aalborg; Attendance: 5,223; Referees: Rawicki, Fabryczny (POL) |
| 21 October 2026; 20:45 | Arnoldsen 6 | (17–13) | three players 5 | Gigantium, Aalborg; Attendance: 5,223; Referees: Rawicki, Fabryczny (POL) |
| 21 October 2026; 20:45 | 5× (suspension) | Report | 4× (suspension) | Gigantium, Aalborg; Attendance: 5,223; Referees: Rawicki, Fabryczny (POL) |

| 28 October 2026; 20:45 | Paris Saint-Germain (France) | 32–25 | (Denmark) Aalborg Håndbold | Stade Pierre de Coubertin, Paris; Attendance: 3,230; Referees: Álvarez, Bustamante (ESP) |
| 28 October 2026; 20:45 | Prandi, Syprzak 8 | (15–11) | Hangaard 7 | Stade Pierre de Coubertin, Paris; Attendance: 3,230; Referees: Álvarez, Bustamante (ESP) |
| 28 October 2026; 20:45 | 2× (yellow card) 2× (suspension) | Report | 1× (yellow card) 3× (suspension) | Stade Pierre de Coubertin, Paris; Attendance: 3,230; Referees: Álvarez, Bustamante (ESP) |

| 28 October 2026; 20:45 | RK Celje Pivovarna Laško (Slovenia) | 32–38 | (Croatia) HC Zagreb | Zlatorog Arena, Celje; Attendance: 4,588; Referees: Schulze, Tönnies (GER) |
| 28 October 2026; 20:45 | Anžič 10 | (16–16) | Tskhovrebadze 11 | Zlatorog Arena, Celje; Attendance: 4,588; Referees: Schulze, Tönnies (GER) |
| 28 October 2026; 20:45 | 5× (suspension) | Report | 3× (suspension) | Zlatorog Arena, Celje; Attendance: 4,588; Referees: Schulze, Tönnies (GER) |

=== Group D ===
| Pos | Team | Pld | W | D | L | GF | GA | GD | Pts | Qualification |
|---|---|---|---|---|---|---|---|---|---|---|
| 1 | (Portugal) Sporting CP | 6 | 5 | 1 | 0 | 228 | 200 | +28 | 11 | Main round |
| 2 | (Denmark) GOG | 6 | 3 | 1 | 2 | 213 | 209 | +4 | 7 | Main round |
| 3 | (Hungary) OTP Bank – Pick Szeged | 6 | 2 | 2 | 2 | 203 | 195 | +8 | 6 | Transfer to EHF European League |
| 4 | (Sweden) IFK Kristianstad | 6 | 0 | 0 | 6 | 188 | 228 | −40 | 0 | Transfer to EHF European League |

Source: EHF
Rules for classification: Tiebreakers

| 10 September 2026; 18:45 | OTP Bank – Pick Szeged (Hungary) | 42–31 | (Sweden) IFK Kristianstad | Pick Aréna, Szeged; Attendance: 3,521; Referees: Pétursson, Þrastarson (ISL) |
| 10 September 2026; 18:45 | Rød 9 | (22–13) | Hallbäck 5 | Pick Aréna, Szeged; Attendance: 3,521; Referees: Pétursson, Þrastarson (ISL) |
| 10 September 2026; 18:45 | 2× (suspension) | Report | 1× (yellow card) 1× (suspension) | Pick Aréna, Szeged; Attendance: 3,521; Referees: Pétursson, Þrastarson (ISL) |

| 10 September 2026; 20:45 | Sporting CP (Portugal) | 43–33 | (Denmark) GOG | Pavilhão João Rocha, Lisbon; Attendance: 1,709; Referees: Boričić, Marković (SRB) |
| 10 September 2026; 20:45 | M. Costa 11 | (21–13) | Mittún 8 | Pavilhão João Rocha, Lisbon; Attendance: 1,709; Referees: Boričić, Marković (SRB) |
| 10 September 2026; 20:45 | 1× (yellow card) 7× (suspension) 1× (red card) | Report | 3× (suspension) | Pavilhão João Rocha, Lisbon; Attendance: 1,709; Referees: Boričić, Marković (SRB) |

| 16 September 2026; 18:45 | GOG (Denmark) | 36–34 | (Hungary) OTP Bank – Pick Szeged | Arena Svendborg, Svendborg; Attendance: 3,075; Referees: García, Marín (ESP) |
| 16 September 2026; 18:45 | Mittún, Zehnder 10 | (18–17) | Rosta 7 | Arena Svendborg, Svendborg; Attendance: 3,075; Referees: García, Marín (ESP) |
| 16 September 2026; 18:45 | 1× (yellow card) 6× (suspension) | Report | 2× (suspension) 1× (red card) | Arena Svendborg, Svendborg; Attendance: 3,075; Referees: García, Marín (ESP) |

| 16 September 2026; 18:45 | IFK Kristianstad (Sweden) | 29–37 | (Portugal) Sporting CP | Kristianstad Arena, Kristianstad; Attendance: 2,113; Referees: Pîrvu, Potîrniche (ROU) |
| 16 September 2026; 18:45 | Nielsen 7 | (16–22) | Þorkelsson 8 | Kristianstad Arena, Kristianstad; Attendance: 2,113; Referees: Pîrvu, Potîrniche (ROU) |
| 16 September 2026; 18:45 | 2× (suspension) | Report | 1× (yellow card) 4× (suspension) | Kristianstad Arena, Kristianstad; Attendance: 2,113; Referees: Pîrvu, Potîrniche (ROU) |

| 7 October 2026; 18:45 | IFK Kristianstad (Sweden) | 32–37 | (Denmark) GOG | Kristianstad Arena, Kristianstad; Attendance: 2,364; Referees: Kuttler, Merz (GER) |
| 7 October 2026; 18:45 | Aðalsteinsson 10 | (14–17) | Tonnesen 7 | Kristianstad Arena, Kristianstad; Attendance: 2,364; Referees: Kuttler, Merz (GER) |
| 7 October 2026; 18:45 | 1× (yellow card) 4× (suspension) | Report | 1× (yellow card) 3× (suspension) | Kristianstad Arena, Kristianstad; Attendance: 2,364; Referees: Kuttler, Merz (GER) |

| 10 October 2026; 20:00 | OTP Bank – Pick Szeged (Hungary) | 35–35 | (Portugal) Sporting CP | Pick Aréna, Szeged; Attendance: 6,123; Referees: Lah, Sok (SLO) |
| 10 October 2026; 20:00 | Šoštarić 11 | (16–16) | F. Costa, M. Costa 8 | Pick Aréna, Szeged; Attendance: 6,123; Referees: Lah, Sok (SLO) |
| 10 October 2026; 20:00 | 2× (yellow card) 3× (suspension) 1× (red card) | Report | 2× (yellow card) 6× (suspension) 1× (red card) | Pick Aréna, Szeged; Attendance: 6,123; Referees: Lah, Sok (SLO) |

| 15 October 2026; 18:45 | GOG (Denmark) | 39–30 | (Sweden) IFK Kristianstad | Arena Svendborg, Svendborg; Attendance: 3,456; Referees: Metalari, Nikolovski (MKD) |
| 15 October 2026; 18:45 | Zehnder 11 | (22–17) | Aðalsteinsson 7 | Arena Svendborg, Svendborg; Attendance: 3,456; Referees: Metalari, Nikolovski (MKD) |
| 15 October 2026; 18:45 | 2× (suspension) | Report | 4× (suspension) | Arena Svendborg, Svendborg; Attendance: 3,456; Referees: Metalari, Nikolovski (MKD) |

| 15 October 2026; 20:45 | Sporting CP (Portugal) | 34–28 | (Hungary) OTP Bank – Pick Szeged | Pavilhão João Rocha, Lisbon; Attendance: 2,165; Referees: Schulze, Tönnies (GER) |
| 15 October 2026; 20:45 | F. Costa 9 | (19–14) | Šoštarić 7 | Pavilhão João Rocha, Lisbon; Attendance: 2,165; Referees: Schulze, Tönnies (GER) |
| 15 October 2026; 20:45 | 1× (yellow card) 3× (suspension) | Report | 1× (yellow card) 3× (suspension) | Pavilhão João Rocha, Lisbon; Attendance: 2,165; Referees: Schulze, Tönnies (GER) |

| 22 October 2026; 18:45 | OTP Bank – Pick Szeged (Hungary) | 33–33 | (Denmark) GOG | Pick Aréna, Szeged; Attendance: 5,482; Referees: Pavićević, Ražnatović (MNE) |
| 22 October 2026; 18:45 | Šoštarić 9 | (17–20) | Lykke 8 | Pick Aréna, Szeged; Attendance: 5,482; Referees: Pavićević, Ražnatović (MNE) |
| 22 October 2026; 18:45 | 2× (suspension) | Report | 2× (suspension) | Pick Aréna, Szeged; Attendance: 5,482; Referees: Pavićević, Ražnatović (MNE) |

| 22 October 2026; 20:45 | Sporting CP (Portugal) | 42–40 | (Sweden) IFK Kristianstad | Pavilhão João Rocha, Lisbon; Attendance: 1,434; Referees: Balvan, Praštalo (BIH) |
| 22 October 2026; 20:45 | F. Costa 14 | (20–18) | Bjarnason 11 | Pavilhão João Rocha, Lisbon; Attendance: 1,434; Referees: Balvan, Praštalo (BIH) |
| 22 October 2026; 20:45 | 1× (yellow card) 2× (suspension) | Report | 3× (suspension) | Pavilhão João Rocha, Lisbon; Attendance: 1,434; Referees: Balvan, Praštalo (BIH) |

| 29 October 2026; 18:45 | GOG (Denmark) | 35–37 | (Portugal) Sporting CP | Arena Svendborg, Svendborg; Attendance: 3,521; Referees: Gasmi, Gasmi (FRA) |
| 29 October 2026; 18:45 | Mittún, Zehnder 11 | (11–16) | F. Costa, M. Costa 7 | Arena Svendborg, Svendborg; Attendance: 3,521; Referees: Gasmi, Gasmi (FRA) |
| 29 October 2026; 18:45 | 1× (yellow card) 3× (suspension) | Report | 4× (suspension) 1× (red card) | Arena Svendborg, Svendborg; Attendance: 3,521; Referees: Gasmi, Gasmi (FRA) |

| 29 October 2026; 18:45 | IFK Kristianstad (Sweden) | 26–31 | (Hungary) OTP Bank – Pick Szeged | Kristianstad Arena, Kristianstad; Attendance: 3,032; Referees: Boričić, Marković (SRB) |
| 29 October 2026; 18:45 | Höghielm 11 | (12–17) | Kukić, Šoštarić 6 | Kristianstad Arena, Kristianstad; Attendance: 3,032; Referees: Boričić, Marković (SRB) |
| 29 October 2026; 18:45 | 1× (suspension) | Report | 1× (yellow card) 4× (suspension) | Kristianstad Arena, Kristianstad; Attendance: 3,032; Referees: Boričić, Marković (SRB) |

=== Group E ===
| Pos | Team | Pld | W | D | L | GF | GA | GD | Pts | Qualification |
|---|---|---|---|---|---|---|---|---|---|---|
| 1 | (Spain) Barça | 6 | 6 | 0 | 0 | 207 | 165 | +42 | 12 | Main round |
| 2 | (Romania) CS Dinamo București | 6 | 2 | 1 | 3 | 170 | 171 | −1 | 5 | Main round |
| 3 | (Denmark) SAH Aarhus | 6 | 2 | 1 | 3 | 177 | 193 | −16 | 5 | Transfer to EHF European League |
| 4 | (France) Montpellier Handball | 6 | 1 | 0 | 5 | 176 | 201 | −25 | 2 | Transfer to EHF European League |

Source: EHF
Rules for classification: Tiebreakers

| 9 September 2026; 20:45 | Barça (Spain) | 39–28 | (Denmark) SAH Aarhus | Palau Blaugrana, Barcelona; Attendance: 1,136; Referees: Kuttler, Merz (GER) |
| 9 September 2026; 20:45 | Mem 7 | (18–13) | Lærke 8 | Palau Blaugrana, Barcelona; Attendance: 1,136; Referees: Kuttler, Merz (GER) |
| 9 September 2026; 20:45 | 1× (yellow card) 1× (suspension) | Report | 2× (yellow card) 3× (suspension) | Palau Blaugrana, Barcelona; Attendance: 1,136; Referees: Kuttler, Merz (GER) |

| 10 September 2026; 18:45 | CS Dinamo București (Romania) | 23–27 | (France) Montpellier Handball | Polyvalent Hall, Bucharest; Attendance: 3,400; Referees: Konjičanin, Konjičanin (BIH) |
| 10 September 2026; 18:45 | Langaro 6 | (9–11) | Balaguer, Villeminot 6 | Polyvalent Hall, Bucharest; Attendance: 3,400; Referees: Konjičanin, Konjičanin (BIH) |
| 10 September 2026; 18:45 | 2× (suspension) | Report | 3× (suspension) | Polyvalent Hall, Bucharest; Attendance: 3,400; Referees: Konjičanin, Konjičanin (BIH) |

| 17 September 2026; 20:45 | Montpellier Handball (France) | 27–28 | (Spain) Barça | Sud de France Arena, Montpellier; Attendance: 7,500; Referees: Metalari, Nikolovski (MKD) |
| 17 September 2026; 20:45 | Villeminot 7 | (15–18) | Mem 5 | Sud de France Arena, Montpellier; Attendance: 7,500; Referees: Metalari, Nikolovski (MKD) |
| 17 September 2026; 20:45 | 5× (suspension) | Report | 2× (yellow card) 3× (suspension) | Sud de France Arena, Montpellier; Attendance: 7,500; Referees: Metalari, Nikolovski (MKD) |

| 17 September 2026; 20:45 | SAH Aarhus (Denmark) | 25–25 | (Romania) CS Dinamo București | Ceres Arena, Aarhus; Attendance: 2,134; Referees: Jovandić, Sekulić (SRB) |
| 17 September 2026; 20:45 | Lærke 6 | (14–15) | Lenbroch, Vujović 5 | Ceres Arena, Aarhus; Attendance: 2,134; Referees: Jovandić, Sekulić (SRB) |
| 17 September 2026; 20:45 | 4× (suspension) | Report | 2× (suspension) | Ceres Arena, Aarhus; Attendance: 2,134; Referees: Jovandić, Sekulić (SRB) |

| 8 October 2026; 20:45 | Barça (Spain) | 34–27 | (Romania) CS Dinamo București | Palau Blaugrana, Barcelona; Attendance: 1,459; Referees: Rawicki, Fabryczny (POL) |
| 8 October 2026; 20:45 | Mem 6 | (16–13) | Vujović 7 | Palau Blaugrana, Barcelona; Attendance: 1,459; Referees: Rawicki, Fabryczny (POL) |
| 8 October 2026; 20:45 | 3× (suspension) | Report | 2× (yellow card) 1× (suspension) 1× (red card) | Palau Blaugrana, Barcelona; Attendance: 1,459; Referees: Rawicki, Fabryczny (POL) |

| 8 October 2026; 20:45 | SAH Aarhus (Denmark) | 36–32 | (France) Montpellier Handball | Ceres Arena, Aarhus; Attendance: 2,947; Referees: Bogdanovs, Čerņavskis (LAT) |
| 8 October 2026; 20:45 | Hansen 7 | (15–13) | Paschal 6 | Ceres Arena, Aarhus; Attendance: 2,947; Referees: Bogdanovs, Čerņavskis (LAT) |
| 8 October 2026; 20:45 | 1× (yellow card) 1× (suspension) | Report | 1× (yellow card) 4× (suspension) | Ceres Arena, Aarhus; Attendance: 2,947; Referees: Bogdanovs, Čerņavskis (LAT) |

| 15 October 2026; 18:45 | CS Dinamo București (Romania) | 22–36 | (Spain) Barça | Polyvalent Hall, Bucharest; Attendance: 4,250; Referees: Budzák, Záhradník (SVK) |
| 15 October 2026; 18:45 | Buzle, Martins 4 | (11–20) | N'Guessan 6 | Polyvalent Hall, Bucharest; Attendance: 4,250; Referees: Budzák, Záhradník (SVK) |
| 15 October 2026; 18:45 | 3× (suspension) | Report | 2× (suspension) | Polyvalent Hall, Bucharest; Attendance: 4,250; Referees: Budzák, Záhradník (SVK) |

| 15 October 2026; 20:45 | Montpellier Handball (France) | 30–38 | (Denmark) SAH Aarhus | Palais des sports René-Bougnol, Montpellier; Attendance: 2,500; Referees: Martins, Martins (POR) |
| 15 October 2026; 20:45 | Lenne, Guigon 4 | (14–18) | Søgaard 6 | Palais des sports René-Bougnol, Montpellier; Attendance: 2,500; Referees: Martins, Martins (POR) |
| 15 October 2026; 20:45 | 2× (suspension) | Report | 1× (suspension) | Palais des sports René-Bougnol, Montpellier; Attendance: 2,500; Referees: Martins, Martins (POR) |

| 21 October 2026; 18:45 | CS Dinamo București (Romania) | 37–23 | (Denmark) SAH Aarhus | Polyvalent Hall, Bucharest; Attendance: 1,860; Referees: Horváth, Marton (HUN) |
| 21 October 2026; 18:45 | Iturriza 5 | (16–12) | Cieslak, Søgaard 4 | Polyvalent Hall, Bucharest; Attendance: 1,860; Referees: Horváth, Marton (HUN) |
| 21 October 2026; 18:45 | 1× (yellow card) 1× (suspension) | Report | 1× (suspension) | Polyvalent Hall, Bucharest; Attendance: 1,860; Referees: Horváth, Marton (HUN) |

| 22 October 2026; 20:45 | Barça (Spain) | 40–34 | (France) Montpellier Handball | Palau Blaugrana, Barcelona; Attendance: 2,156; Referees: Jørum, Kleven (NOR) |
| 22 October 2026; 20:45 | three players 7 | (20–18) | Casado, Villeminot 6 | Palau Blaugrana, Barcelona; Attendance: 2,156; Referees: Jørum, Kleven (NOR) |
| 22 October 2026; 20:45 | 1× (suspension) | Report | 4× (suspension) 1× (red card) | Palau Blaugrana, Barcelona; Attendance: 2,156; Referees: Jørum, Kleven (NOR) |

| 29 October 2026; 20:45 | Montpellier Handball (France) | 26–36 | (Romania) CS Dinamo București | Sud de France Arena, Montpellier; Attendance: 3,000; Referees: Kuttler, Merz (GER) |
| 29 October 2026; 20:45 | Villeminot 9 | (16–16) | Vujović 8 | Sud de France Arena, Montpellier; Attendance: 3,000; Referees: Kuttler, Merz (GER) |
| 29 October 2026; 20:45 | 1× (yellow card) 5× (suspension) | Report | 2× (suspension) | Sud de France Arena, Montpellier; Attendance: 3,000; Referees: Kuttler, Merz (GER) |

| 29 October 2026; 20:45 | SAH Aarhus (Denmark) | 27–30 | (Spain) Barça | Ceres Arena, Aarhus; Attendance: 4,800; Referees: Barysas, Petrusis (LTU) |
| 29 October 2026; 20:45 | Cieslak 6 | (14–15) | Gómez 6 | Ceres Arena, Aarhus; Attendance: 4,800; Referees: Barysas, Petrusis (LTU) |
| 29 October 2026; 20:45 | 1× (yellow card) 5× (suspension) | Report | 1× (suspension) | Ceres Arena, Aarhus; Attendance: 4,800; Referees: Barysas, Petrusis (LTU) |

=== Group F ===
| Pos | Team | Pld | W | D | L | GF | GA | GD | Pts | Qualification |
|---|---|---|---|---|---|---|---|---|---|---|
| 1 | (Germany) SC Magdeburg | 6 | 6 | 0 | 0 | 212 | 169 | +43 | 12 | Main round |
| 2 | (Poland) Industria Kielce | 6 | 4 | 0 | 2 | 195 | 188 | +7 | 8 | Main round |
| 3 | (Switzerland) HC Kriens-Luzern | 6 | 2 | 0 | 4 | 187 | 197 | −10 | 4 | Transfer to EHF European League |
| 4 | (Norway) Kolstad Håndball | 6 | 0 | 0 | 6 | 178 | 218 | −40 | 0 | Transfer to EHF European League |

Source: EHF
Rules for classification: Tiebreakers

| 9 September 2026; 18:45 | Industria Kielce (Poland) | 30–29 | (Switzerland) HC Kriens-Luzern | Hala Legionów, Kielce; Attendance: 4,321; Referees: Bíró, Kiss (HUN) |
| 9 September 2026; 18:45 | Vlah 8 | (19–15) | Šipić 8 | Hala Legionów, Kielce; Attendance: 4,321; Referees: Bíró, Kiss (HUN) |
| 9 September 2026; 18:45 | 2× (suspension) | Report | 1× (yellow card) 5× (suspension) | Hala Legionów, Kielce; Attendance: 4,321; Referees: Bíró, Kiss (HUN) |

| 9 September 2026; 20:45 | SC Magdeburg (Germany) | 37–22 | (Norway) Kolstad Håndball | GETEC Arena, Magdeburg; Attendance: 5,500; Referees: Kull, Tint (EST) |
| 9 September 2026; 20:45 | Magnússon 7 | (19–12) | Jeppsson 5 | GETEC Arena, Magdeburg; Attendance: 5,500; Referees: Kull, Tint (EST) |
| 9 September 2026; 20:45 | 2× (suspension) | Report | 2× (suspension) | GETEC Arena, Magdeburg; Attendance: 5,500; Referees: Kull, Tint (EST) |

| 16 September 2026; 20:45 | Kolstad Håndball (Norway) | 29–36 | (Poland) Industria Kielce | Kolstad Arena, Trondheim; Attendance: 1,556; Referees: Bogdanovs, Čerņavskis (LAT) |
| 16 September 2026; 20:45 | Berge 7 | (14–20) | Vlah 9 | Kolstad Arena, Trondheim; Attendance: 1,556; Referees: Bogdanovs, Čerņavskis (LAT) |
| 16 September 2026; 20:45 | 2× (suspension) | Report | 1× (yellow card) 4× (suspension) | Kolstad Arena, Trondheim; Attendance: 1,556; Referees: Bogdanovs, Čerņavskis (LAT) |

| 17 September 2026; 20:45 | HC Kriens-Luzern (Switzerland) | 29–39 | (Germany) SC Magdeburg | Pilatus Arena, Kriens; Attendance: 3,899; Referees: Álvarez, Bustamante (ESP) |
| 17 September 2026; 20:45 | Schelker 7 | (11–20) | four players 5 | Pilatus Arena, Kriens; Attendance: 3,899; Referees: Álvarez, Bustamante (ESP) |
| 17 September 2026; 20:45 | 1× (suspension) | Report | 1× (yellow card) 1× (suspension) | Pilatus Arena, Kriens; Attendance: 3,899; Referees: Álvarez, Bustamante (ESP) |

| 7 October 2026; 18:45 | HC Kriens-Luzern (Switzerland) | 34–32 | (Norway) Kolstad Håndball | Pilatus Arena, Kriens; Attendance: 3,838; Referees: Mitrevski, Todorovski (MKD) |
| 7 October 2026; 18:45 | Je. Müller 10 | (19–16) | Jeppsson 8 | Pilatus Arena, Kriens; Attendance: 3,838; Referees: Mitrevski, Todorovski (MKD) |
| 7 October 2026; 18:45 | 1× (yellow card) 1× (suspension) | Report | 1× (yellow card) 3× (suspension) | Pilatus Arena, Kriens; Attendance: 3,838; Referees: Mitrevski, Todorovski (MKD) |

| 7 October 2026; 20:45 | Industria Kielce (Poland) | 30–35 | (Germany) SC Magdeburg | Hala Legionów, Kielce; Attendance: 4,200; Referees: Hansen, Madsen (DEN) |
| 7 October 2026; 20:45 | Vlah 8 | (17–19) | Kristjánsson, Magnússon 11 | Hala Legionów, Kielce; Attendance: 4,200; Referees: Hansen, Madsen (DEN) |
| 7 October 2026; 20:45 | 1× (yellow card) 3× (suspension) | Report | 1× (yellow card) 2× (suspension) | Hala Legionów, Kielce; Attendance: 4,200; Referees: Hansen, Madsen (DEN) |

| 14 October 2026; 18:45 | SC Magdeburg (Germany) | 30–27 | (Poland) Industria Kielce | GETEC Arena, Magdeburg; Attendance: 6,401; Referees: Jovandić, Sekulić (SRB) |
| 14 October 2026; 18:45 | Kristjánsson 6 | (13–14) | Nahi 6 | GETEC Arena, Magdeburg; Attendance: 6,401; Referees: Jovandić, Sekulić (SRB) |
| 14 October 2026; 18:45 | 1× (yellow card) 4× (suspension) | Report | 7× (suspension) | GETEC Arena, Magdeburg; Attendance: 6,401; Referees: Jovandić, Sekulić (SRB) |

| 14 October 2026; 18:45 | Kolstad Håndball (Norway) | 28–36 | (Switzerland) HC Kriens-Luzern | Kolstad Arena, Trondheim; Attendance: 1,375; Referees: Gasmi, Gasmi (FRA) |
| 14 October 2026; 18:45 | Jeppsson 9 | (13–16) | Je. Müller 12 | Kolstad Arena, Trondheim; Attendance: 1,375; Referees: Gasmi, Gasmi (FRA) |
| 14 October 2026; 18:45 | 2× (suspension) | Report | 1× (yellow card) | Kolstad Arena, Trondheim; Attendance: 1,375; Referees: Gasmi, Gasmi (FRA) |

| 21 October 2026; 20:45 | HC Kriens-Luzern (Switzerland) | 30–32 | (Poland) Industria Kielce | Pilatus Arena, Kriens; Attendance: 4,060; Referees: Konjičanin, Konjičanin (BIH) |
| 21 October 2026; 20:45 | Šipić 8 | (17–19) | Monar 8 | Pilatus Arena, Kriens; Attendance: 4,060; Referees: Konjičanin, Konjičanin (BIH) |
| 21 October 2026; 20:45 | 1× (yellow card) 3× (suspension) 1× (red card) | Report | 1× (suspension) | Pilatus Arena, Kriens; Attendance: 4,060; Referees: Konjičanin, Konjičanin (BIH) |

| 22 October 2026; 20:45 | Kolstad Håndball (Norway) | 32–35 | (Germany) SC Magdeburg | Kolstad Arena, Trondheim; Attendance: 1,371; Referees: Bíró, Kiss (HUN) |
| 22 October 2026; 20:45 | Jeppsson 10 | (15–15) | Weber 11 | Kolstad Arena, Trondheim; Attendance: 1,371; Referees: Bíró, Kiss (HUN) |
| 22 October 2026; 20:45 | 1× (suspension) | Report | 2× (suspension) | Kolstad Arena, Trondheim; Attendance: 1,371; Referees: Bíró, Kiss (HUN) |

| 28 October 2026; 20:45 | SC Magdeburg (Germany) | 36–29 | (Switzerland) HC Kriens-Luzern | GETEC Arena, Magdeburg; Attendance: 5,797; Referees: Metalari, Nikolovski (MKD) |
| 28 October 2026; 20:45 | Rasmussen 9 | (18–11) | Je. Müller 8 | GETEC Arena, Magdeburg; Attendance: 5,797; Referees: Metalari, Nikolovski (MKD) |
| 28 October 2026; 20:45 | 1× (yellow card) 3× (suspension) | Report | 1× (yellow card) 2× (suspension) | GETEC Arena, Magdeburg; Attendance: 5,797; Referees: Metalari, Nikolovski (MKD) |

| 28 October 2026; 20:45 | Industria Kielce (Poland) | 40–35 | (Norway) Kolstad Håndball | Hala Legionów, Kielce; Attendance: 3,200; Referees: Cindrić, Gonzurek (CRO) |
| 28 October 2026; 20:45 | Rabchynski 8 | (19–16) | Jeppsson 9 | Hala Legionów, Kielce; Attendance: 3,200; Referees: Cindrić, Gonzurek (CRO) |
| 28 October 2026; 20:45 | 2× (suspension) | Report | 1× (yellow card) 2× (suspension) | Hala Legionów, Kielce; Attendance: 3,200; Referees: Cindrić, Gonzurek (CRO) |
