= 2026–27 EHF Champions League main round =

The 2026–27 EHF Champions League main round will be played between 18 November 2026 and 4 March 2027 to determine the eight teams advancing to the knockout stage of the 2026–27 EHF Champions League.

== Format ==
The 12 teams will be split into two groups of six teams and play a round-robin with home and away matches against the teams they not faced already. The top four-placed teams advance to the knockout stage.

== Qualified teams ==
The top two teams from Groups A to F qualify for the main round.

| Group | First place | Second place |
|---|---|---|
| A | (Hungary) One Veszprém HC | (Germany) Füchse Berlin |
| B | (Poland) Orlen Wisła Płock | (Germany) MT Melsungen |
| C | (France) Paris Saint-Germain | (Denmark) Aalborg Håndbold |
| D | (Portugal) Sporting CP | (Denmark) GOG |
| E | (Spain) Barça | (Romania) CS Dinamo București |
| F | (Germany) SC Magdeburg | (Poland) Industria Kielce |

== Tiebreakers ==
In the group stage, teams are ranked according to points (2 points for a win, 1 point for a draw, 0 points for a loss). After completion of the group stage, if two or more teams have the same number of points, the ranking will be determined as follows:

1. Highest number of points in matches between the teams directly involved;
2. Superior goal difference in matches between the teams directly involved;
3. Highest number of goals scored in matches between the teams directly involved;
4. Superior goal difference in all matches of the group;
5. Highest number of plus goals in all matches of the group;

If the ranking of one of these teams is determined, the above criteria are consecutively followed until the ranking of all teams is determined. If no ranking can be determined, a decision shall be obtained by EHF through drawing of lots.

== Schedule ==
The group stage is scheduled to be played between 18 November 2026 and 4 March 2027. The exact playing schedule for both groups will be released by the EHF in due time.

| Round | Dates |
|---|---|
| Round 1 | 18–19 November 2026 |
| Round 2 | 25–26 November 2026 |
| Round 3 | 2–3 December 2026 |
| Round 4 | 9–10 December 2026 |
| Round 5 | 10–11 February 2027 |
| Round 6 | 17–18 February 2027 |
| Round 7 | 24–25 February 2027 |
| Round 8 | 3–4 March 2027 |

== Groups ==
=== Group I ===
| Pos | Team | Pld | W | D | L | GF | GA | GD | Pts | Qualification |
|---|---|---|---|---|---|---|---|---|---|---|
| 1 | (Hungary) One Veszprém HC | 3 | 3 | 0 | 0 | 104 | 90 | +14 | 6 | Quarterfinals |
| 2 | (France) Paris Saint-Germain | 3 | 2 | 1 | 0 | 100 | 91 | +9 | 5 | Quarterfinals |
| 3 | (Denmark) Aalborg Håndbold | 3 | 1 | 1 | 1 | 92 | 96 | −4 | 3 | Quarterfinals |
| 4 | (Germany) MT Melsungen | 3 | 1 | 0 | 2 | 85 | 86 | −1 | 2 | Quarterfinals |
| 5 | (Poland) Orlen Wisła Płock | 3 | 1 | 0 | 2 | 77 | 82 | −5 | 2 | Transfer to EHF European League |
| 6 | (Germany) Füchse Berlin | 3 | 0 | 0 | 3 | 95 | 108 | −13 | 0 | |

Updated to match(es) played on 19 November 2026. Source: EHF
Rules for classification: Tiebreakers

| 18 November 2026; 18:45 | Aalborg Håndbold (Denmark) | 34–31 | (Germany) Füchse Berlin | Gigantium, Aalborg; Attendance: 5,500; Referees: Lah, Sok (SLO) |
| 18 November 2026; 18:45 | Sagosen 9 | (18–16) | Gidsel, Grøndahl 8 | Gigantium, Aalborg; Attendance: 5,500; Referees: Lah, Sok (SLO) |
| 18 November 2026; 18:45 | 1× (yellow card) 4× (suspension) | Report | 4× (suspension) | Gigantium, Aalborg; Attendance: 5,500; Referees: Lah, Sok (SLO) |

| 18 November 2026; 20:45 | Orlen Wisła Płock (Poland) | 26–30 | (Hungary) One Veszprém HC | Orlen Arena, Płock; Attendance: 4,060; Referees: Gasmi, Gasmi (FRA) |
| 18 November 2026; 20:45 | Bjerre 8 | (17–14) | Descat 8 | Orlen Arena, Płock; Attendance: 4,060; Referees: Gasmi, Gasmi (FRA) |
| 18 November 2026; 20:45 | 1× (yellow card) 3× (suspension) | Report | 1× (yellow card) 2× (suspension) 2× (red card) | Orlen Arena, Płock; Attendance: 4,060; Referees: Gasmi, Gasmi (FRA) |

| 19 November 2026; 20:45 | MT Melsungen (Germany) | 33–35 | (France) Paris Saint-Germain | Rothenbach-Halle, Kassel; Attendance: 4,074; Referees: García, Marín (ESP) |
| 19 November 2026; 20:45 | Golla, Mensing 8 | (18–18) | Elohim Prandi 8 | Rothenbach-Halle, Kassel; Attendance: 4,074; Referees: García, Marín (ESP) |
| 19 November 2026; 20:45 | 1× (yellow card) 2× (suspension) | Report | 2× (yellow card) 2× (suspension) | Rothenbach-Halle, Kassel; Attendance: 4,074; Referees: García, Marín (ESP) |

| 26 November 2026; 18:45 | One Veszprém HC (Hungary) | v | (Denmark) Aalborg Håndbold | Veszprém Aréna, Veszprém; Referees: Kuttler, Merz (GER) |
| 26 November 2026; 18:45 | | Report | | Veszprém Aréna, Veszprém; Referees: Kuttler, Merz (GER) |

| 26 November 2026; 20:45 | Paris Saint-Germain (France) | v | (Poland) Orlen Wisła Płock | Stade Pierre de Coubertin, Paris; Referees: Schulze, Tönnies (GER) |
| 26 November 2026; 20:45 | | Report | | Stade Pierre de Coubertin, Paris; Referees: Schulze, Tönnies (GER) |

| 26 November 2026; 20:45 | Füchse Berlin (Germany) | v | (Germany) MT Melsungen | Max-Schmeling-Halle, Berlin; Referees: Konjičanin, Konjičanin (BIH) |
| 26 November 2026; 20:45 | | Report | | Max-Schmeling-Halle, Berlin; Referees: Konjičanin, Konjičanin (BIH) |

| 2 December 2026; 18:45 | One Veszprém HC (Hungary) | v | (Germany) MT Melsungen | Veszprém Aréna, Veszprém |
| 2 December 2026; 18:45 | | Report | | Veszprém Aréna, Veszprém |

| 2 December 2026; 20:45 | Aalborg Håndbold (Denmark) | v | (Poland) Orlen Wisła Płock | Gigantium, Aalborg |
| 2 December 2026; 20:45 | | Report | | Gigantium, Aalborg |

| 3 December 2026; 18:45 | Füchse Berlin (Germany) | v | (France) Paris Saint-Germain | Max-Schmeling-Halle, Berlin |
| 3 December 2026; 18:45 | | Report | | Max-Schmeling-Halle, Berlin |

| 9 December 2026; 18:45 | MT Melsungen (Germany) | v | (Denmark) Aalborg Håndbold | Rothenbach-Halle, Kassel |
| 9 December 2026; 18:45 | | Report | | Rothenbach-Halle, Kassel |

| 10 December 2026; 18:45 | Orlen Wisła Płock (Poland) | v | (Germany) Füchse Berlin | Orlen Arena, Płock |
| 10 December 2026; 18:45 | | Report | | Orlen Arena, Płock |

| 10 December 2026; 20:45 | Paris Saint-Germain (France) | v | (Hungary) One Veszprém HC | Stade Pierre de Coubertin, Paris |
| 10 December 2026; 20:45 | | Report | | Stade Pierre de Coubertin, Paris |

| 10 February 2027; 18:45 | One Veszprém HC (Hungary) | v | (Poland) Orlen Wisła Płock | Veszprém Aréna, Veszprém |
| 10 February 2027; 18:45 | | Report | | Veszprém Aréna, Veszprém |

| 11 February 2027; 18:45 | Füchse Berlin (Germany) | v | (Denmark) Aalborg Håndbold | Max-Schmeling-Halle, Berlin |
| 11 February 2027; 18:45 | | Report | | Max-Schmeling-Halle, Berlin |

| 11 February 2027; 20:45 | Paris Saint-Germain (France) | v | (Germany) MT Melsungen | Stade Pierre de Coubertin, Paris |
| 11 February 2027; 20:45 | | Report | | Stade Pierre de Coubertin, Paris |

| 17 February 2027; 18:45 | Aalborg Håndbold (Denmark) | v | (Hungary) One Veszprém HC | Gigantium, Aalborg |
| 17 February 2027; 18:45 | | Report | | Gigantium, Aalborg |

| 18 February 2027; 20:45 | Orlen Wisła Płock (Poland) | v | (France) Paris Saint-Germain | Orlen Arena, Płock |
| 18 February 2027; 20:45 | | Report | | Orlen Arena, Płock |

| 18 February 2027; 18:45 | MT Melsungen (Germany) | v | (Germany) Füchse Berlin | Rothenbach-Halle, Kassel |
| 18 February 2027; 18:45 | | Report | | Rothenbach-Halle, Kassel |

| 24 February 2027; 18:45 | One Veszprém HC (Hungary) | v | (France) Paris Saint-Germain | Veszprém Aréna, Veszprém |
| 24 February 2027; 18:45 | | Report | | Veszprém Aréna, Veszprém |

| 24 February 2027; 18:45 | Aalborg Håndbold (Denmark) | v | (Germany) MT Melsungen | Gigantium, Aalborg |
| 24 February 2027; 18:45 | | Report | | Gigantium, Aalborg |

| 25 February 2027; 20:45 | Füchse Berlin (Germany) | v | (Poland) Orlen Wisła Płock | Max-Schmeling-Halle, Berlin |
| 25 February 2027; 20:45 | | Report | | Max-Schmeling-Halle, Berlin |

| 3 March 2027; 20:45 | Paris Saint-Germain (France) | v | (Germany) Füchse Berlin | Stade Pierre de Coubertin, Paris |
| 3 March 2027; 20:45 | | Report | | Stade Pierre de Coubertin, Paris |

| 3 March 2027; 20:45 | MT Melsungen (Germany) | v | (Hungary) One Veszprém HC | Rothenbach-Halle, Kassel |
| 3 March 2027; 20:45 | | Report | | Rothenbach-Halle, Kassel |

| 4 March 2027; 18:45 | Orlen Wisła Płock (Poland) | v | (Denmark) Aalborg Håndbold | Orlen Arena, Płock |
| 4 March 2027; 18:45 | | Report | | Orlen Arena, Płock |

=== Group II ===
| Pos | Team | Pld | W | D | L | GF | GA | GD | Pts | Qualification |
|---|---|---|---|---|---|---|---|---|---|---|
| 1 | (Spain) Barça | 3 | 3 | 0 | 0 | 102 | 73 | +29 | 6 | Quarterfinals |
| 2 | (Portugal) Sporting CP | 3 | 3 | 0 | 0 | 116 | 95 | +21 | 6 | Quarterfinals |
| 3 | (Germany) SC Magdeburg | 3 | 3 | 0 | 0 | 101 | 92 | +9 | 6 | Quarterfinals |
| 4 | (Denmark) GOG | 3 | 0 | 0 | 3 | 103 | 116 | −13 | 0 | Quarterfinals |
| 5 | (Poland) Industria Kielce | 3 | 0 | 0 | 3 | 81 | 97 | −16 | 0 | Transfer to EHF European League |
| 6 | (Romania) CS Dinamo București | 3 | 0 | 0 | 3 | 76 | 106 | −30 | 0 | |

Updated to match(es) played on 19 November 2026. Source: EHF
Rules for classification: Tiebreakers

| 19 November 2026; 18:45 | Industria Kielce (Poland) | 24–32 | (Spain) Barça | Hala Legionów, Kielce; Attendance: 4,200; Referees: Pavićević, Ražnatović (MNE) |
| 19 November 2026; 18:45 | Monar, Nahi 5 | (14–18) | S. El-Deraa 6 | Hala Legionów, Kielce; Attendance: 4,200; Referees: Pavićević, Ražnatović (MNE) |
| 19 November 2026; 18:45 | 1× (yellow card) 1× (suspension) 1× (red card) | Report | 1× (suspension) | Hala Legionów, Kielce; Attendance: 4,200; Referees: Pavićević, Ražnatović (MNE) |

| 19 November 2026; 18:45 | GOG (Denmark) | 35–36 | (Germany) SC Magdeburg | Arena Svendborg, Svendborg; Attendance: 2,935; Referees: Boričić, Marković (SRB) |
| 19 November 2026; 18:45 | Lykke 7 | (20–21) | Magnússon, Claar 9 | Arena Svendborg, Svendborg; Attendance: 2,935; Referees: Boričić, Marković (SRB) |
| 19 November 2026; 18:45 | 1× (yellow card) 2× (suspension) | Report | 1× (yellow card) 5× (suspension) | Arena Svendborg, Svendborg; Attendance: 2,935; Referees: Boričić, Marković (SRB) |

| 19 November 2026; 20:45 | Sporting CP (Portugal) | 36–27 | (Romania) CS Dinamo București | Pavilhão João Rocha, Lisbon; Attendance: 2,000; Referees: Metalari, Nikolovski (MKD) |
| 19 November 2026; 20:45 | F. Costa 11 | (18–14) | Dedu 8 | Pavilhão João Rocha, Lisbon; Attendance: 2,000; Referees: Metalari, Nikolovski (MKD) |
| 19 November 2026; 20:45 | 1× (yellow card) 2× (suspension) | Report | 1× (yellow card) 3× (suspension) | Pavilhão João Rocha, Lisbon; Attendance: 2,000; Referees: Metalari, Nikolovski (MKD) |

| 25 November 2026; 18:45 | CS Dinamo București (Romania) | v | (Poland) Industria Kielce | Polyvalent Hall, Bucharest; Referees: Bíró, Kiss (HUN) |
| 25 November 2026; 18:45 | | Report | | Polyvalent Hall, Bucharest; Referees: Bíró, Kiss (HUN) |

| 25 November 2026; 20:45 | SC Magdeburg (Germany) | v | (Portugal) Sporting CP | GETEC Arena, Magdeburg; Referees: Hansen, Madsen (DEN) |
| 25 November 2026; 20:45 | | Report | | GETEC Arena, Magdeburg; Referees: Hansen, Madsen (DEN) |

| 26 November 2026; 20:45 | Barça (Spain) | v | (Denmark) GOG | Palau Blaugrana, Barcelona; Referees: Kurtagic, Wetterwik (SWE) |
| 26 November 2026; 20:45 | | Report | | Palau Blaugrana, Barcelona; Referees: Kurtagic, Wetterwik (SWE) |

| 2 December 2026; 18:45 | GOG (Denmark) | v | (Poland) Industria Kielce | Arena Svendborg, Svendborg |
| 2 December 2026; 18:45 | | Report | | Arena Svendborg, Svendborg |

| 2 December 2026; 20:45 | SC Magdeburg (Germany) | v | (Romania) CS Dinamo București | GETEC Arena, Magdeburg |
| 2 December 2026; 20:45 | | Report | | GETEC Arena, Magdeburg |

| 3 December 2026; 20:45 | Sporting CP (Portugal) | v | (Spain) Barça | Pavilhão João Rocha, Lisbon |
| 3 December 2026; 20:45 | | Report | | Pavilhão João Rocha, Lisbon |

| 9 December 2026; 18:45 | Industria Kielce (Poland) | v | (Portugal) Sporting CP | Hala Legionów, Kielce |
| 9 December 2026; 18:45 | | Report | | Hala Legionów, Kielce |

| 9 December 2026; 20:45 | Barça (Spain) | v | (Germany) SC Magdeburg | Palau Blaugrana, Barcelona |
| 9 December 2026; 20:45 | | Report | | Palau Blaugrana, Barcelona |

| 10 December 2026; 18:45 | CS Dinamo București (Romania) | v | (Denmark) GOG | Polyvalent Hall, Bucharest |
| 10 December 2026; 18:45 | | Report | | Polyvalent Hall, Bucharest |

| 10 February 2027; 20:45 | SC Magdeburg (Germany) | v | (Denmark) GOG | GETEC Arena, Magdeburg |
| 10 February 2027; 20:45 | | Report | | GETEC Arena, Magdeburg |

| 11 February 2027; 18:45 | Industria Kielce (Poland) | v | (Romania) CS Dinamo București | Hala Legionów, Kielce |
| 11 February 2027; 18:45 | | Report | | Hala Legionów, Kielce |

| 11 February 2027; 20:45 | Barça (Spain) | v | (Portugal) Sporting CP | Palau Blaugrana, Barcelona |
| 11 February 2027; 20:45 | | Report | | Palau Blaugrana, Barcelona |

| 17 February 2027; 18:45 | CS Dinamo București (Romania) | v | (Germany) SC Magdeburg | Polyvalent Hall, Bucharest |
| 17 February 2027; 18:45 | | Report | | Polyvalent Hall, Bucharest |

| 18 February 2027; 20:45 | Sporting CP (Portugal) | v | (Poland) Industria Kielce | Pavilhão João Rocha, Lisbon |
| 18 February 2027; 20:45 | | Report | | Pavilhão João Rocha, Lisbon |

| 18 February 2027; 18:45 | GOG (Denmark) | v | (Spain) Barça | Arena Svendborg, Svendborg |
| 18 February 2027; 18:45 | | Report | | Arena Svendborg, Svendborg |

| 24 February 2027; 20:45 | SC Magdeburg (Germany) | v | (Spain) Barça | GETEC Arena, Magdeburg |
| 24 February 2027; 20:45 | | Report | | GETEC Arena, Magdeburg |

| 25 February 2027; 18:45 | Industria Kielce (Poland) | v | (Denmark) GOG | Hala Legionów, Kielce |
| 25 February 2027; 18:45 | | Report | | Hala Legionów, Kielce |

| 25 February 2027; 18:45 | CS Dinamo București (Romania) | v | (Portugal) Sporting CP | Polyvalent Hall, Bucharest |
| 25 February 2027; 18:45 | | Report | | Polyvalent Hall, Bucharest |

| 3 March 2027; 18:45 | Barça (Spain) | v | (Poland) Industria Kielce | Palau Blaugrana, Barcelona |
| 3 March 2027; 18:45 | | Report | | Palau Blaugrana, Barcelona |

| 4 March 2027; 20:45 | Sporting CP (Portugal) | v | (Germany) SC Magdeburg | Pavilhão João Rocha, Lisbon |
| 4 March 2027; 20:45 | | Report | | Pavilhão João Rocha, Lisbon |

| 4 March 2027; 20:45 | GOG (Denmark) | v | (Romania) CS Dinamo București | Arena Svendborg, Svendborg |
| 4 March 2027; 20:45 | | Report | | Arena Svendborg, Svendborg |
