= 2026–27 EHF Champions League =

67th edition of Europe's premier club handball tournament

EHF Champions League
- 2026–27

Tournament information
- Sport: Handball
- Dates: 9 September 2026–13 June 2027
- Teams: 24
- Website: ehfcl.com

Tournament statistics
- Matches played: 82
- Goals scored: 4739 (57.79 per match)
- Attendance: 306,021 (3,732 per match)
- Top scorer(s): Mathias Gidsel (73 goals)

The 2026–27 EHF Champions League is the 67th edition of Europe's premier club handball tournament, running from 9 September 2026 to 13 June 2027.

== Format ==
The tournament will see a new format. The 24 teams will be split into six groups of four teams and play a round-robin with home and away matches. The top two-placed teams advance to the main round, which consists of two groups of six, also playing home and away matches against the teams they not played already. The top four-placed teams advance to the quarterfinals, from whereon a knockout system will be used.

== Association ranking ==
The rankings are based on the performances from the three most recent seasons.

- Associations ranked 1–10 have their league champion qualify for the group stage and can apply for a wildcard for two more teams.
- Associations ranked outside the top ten can only have their league champion apply for a wildcard.

Rank	Association	Average points	Teams
1	Germany	210.33	1
2	Spain	186.33	1
3	France	139.33	1
4	Denmark	138.67	1
5	Poland	128.00	1
6	Hungary	118.00	1
7	Romania	77.50	1
8	Portugal	59.67	1
9	Croatia	48.67	1
10	Norway	34.33	1
11	Slovenia	29.00	0
12	North Macedonia	20.00	0
13	38 associations	0.00	0

== Participating teams ==
27 teams applied for a place, with ten having a fixed place. The full list was announced on 22 June 2026.

(Croatia) HC Zagreb (1st)	(Denmark) Aalborg Håndbold (1st)	(Spain) Barça (1st)	(France) Paris Saint-Germain (1st)
(Germany) SC Magdeburg (1st)	(Hungary) One Veszprém HC (1st)	(Norway) Kolstad Håndball (1st)	(Poland) Industria Kielce (1st)
(Portugal) Sporting CP (1st)	(Romania) CS Dinamo București (1st)	(Germany) MT Melsungen (EL)	(Denmark) SAH Aarhus (2nd) ^{U}
(Denmark) GOG (3rd) ^{U}	(France) HBC Nantes (2nd) ^{U}	(France) Montpellier Handball (3rd) ^{U}	(Germany) Füchse Berlin (2nd) ^{U}
(Hungary) OTP Bank – Pick Szeged (2nd) ^{U}	(North Macedonia) HC Vardar 1961 (1st) ^{U}	(Poland) Orlen Wisła Płock (2nd) ^{U}	(Portugal) FC Porto (2nd) ^{U}
(Slovenia) RK Celje Pivovarna Laško (1st) ^{U}	(Serbia) RK Partizan (1st) ^{U}	(Switzerland) HC Kriens-Luzern (1st) ^{U}	(Sweden) IFK Kristianstad (1st) ^{U}

- ^{EL}: European League title holders
- ^{U} Confirmed upgrades

Rejected upgrades

(Hungary) MOL Tatabánya KC (3rd)	(Iceland) Valur (1st)	(Norway) Elverum Håndball (3rd)

== Draw ==
The draw took place on 26 June 2026.

== Tiebreakers ==
In the group stage, teams are ranked according to points (2 points for a win, 1 point for a draw, 0 points for a loss). After completion of the group stage, if two or more teams have the same number of points, the ranking will be determined as follows:

1. Highest number of points in matches between the teams directly involved;
2. Superior goal difference in matches between the teams directly involved;
3. Highest number of goals scored in matches between the teams directly involved;
4. Superior goal difference in all matches of the group;
5. Highest number of plus goals in all matches of the group;

If the ranking of one of these teams is determined, the above criteria are consecutively followed until the ranking of all teams is determined. If no ranking can be determined, a decision shall be obtained by EHF through drawing of lots.

Location of teams of the 2026–27 EHF Champions League group phase.

Red: Group A; Blue: Group B; Green: Group C;

Yellow: Group D; Orange: Group E; Purple: Group F.

== Group stage ==
=== Group A ===
Pos	Team	Pld	W	D	L	GF	GA	GD	Pts	Qualification	VES	BER	POR	PAR
1	(Hungary) One Veszprém HC	6	6	0	0	219	175	+44	12	Main round	—	39–35	36–28	38–28
2	(Germany) Füchse Berlin	6	4	0	2	224	205	+19	8	Main round	29–35	—	40–32	40–33
3	(Portugal) FC Porto	6	1	1	4	187	207	−20	3	Transfer to EHF European League	29–34	33–36	—	32–28
4	(Serbia) RK Partizan AdmiralBet	6	0	1	5	181	224	−43	1	Transfer to EHF European League	26–37	33–44	33–33	—

Source: EHF
Rules for classification: Tiebreakers

=== Group B ===
Pos	Team	Pld	W	D	L	GF	GA	GD	Pts	Qualification	PLO	MEL	NAN	VAR
1	(Poland) Orlen Wisła Płock	6	4	0	2	174	163	+11	8	Main round	—	25–24	33–27	33–32
2	(Germany) MT Melsungen	6	3	1	2	164	164	0	7	Main round	28–26	—	28–23	33–31
3	(France) HBC Nantes	6	3	0	3	169	176	−7	6	Transfer to EHF European League	26–25	33–25	—	27–33
4	(North Macedonia) HC Vardar 1961	6	1	1	4	180	184	−4	3	Transfer to EHF European League	26–32	26–26	32–33	—

Source: EHF
Rules for classification: Tiebreakers

=== Group C ===
Pos	Team	Pld	W	D	L	GF	GA	GD	Pts	Qualification	PAR	AAL	ZAG	CEL
1	(France) Paris Saint-Germain	6	4	1	1	214	182	+32	9 (Note: Paris Saint-Germain 65–58 Aalborg Håndbold)	Main round	—	32–25	34–30	46–35
2	(Denmark) Aalborg Håndbold	6	4	1	1	195	177	+18	9	Main round	33–33	—	34–33	34–30
3	(Croatia) HC Zagreb	6	3	0	3	184	190	−6	6	Transfer to EHF European League	29–28	23–33	—	31–29
4	(Slovenia) RK Celje Pivovarna Laško	6	0	0	6	182	226	−44	0	Transfer to EHF European League	30–41	26–36	32–38	—

Source: EHF
Rules for classification: Tiebreakers

=== Group D ===
Pos	Team	Pld	W	D	L	GF	GA	GD	Pts	Qualification	SPO	GOG	SZE	KRI
1	(Portugal) Sporting CP	6	5	1	0	228	200	+28	11	Main round	—	43–33	34–28	42–40
2	(Denmark) GOG	6	3	1	2	213	209	+4	7	Main round	35–37	—	36–34	39–30
3	(Hungary) OTP Bank – Pick Szeged	6	2	2	2	203	195	+8	6	Transfer to EHF European League	35–35	33–33	—	42–31
4	(Sweden) IFK Kristianstad	6	0	0	6	188	228	−40	0	Transfer to EHF European League	29–37	32–37	26–31	—

Source: EHF
Rules for classification: Tiebreakers

=== Group E ===
Pos	Team	Pld	W	D	L	GF	GA	GD	Pts	Qualification	BAR	BUC	AAR	MON
1	(Spain) Barça	6	6	0	0	207	165	+42	12	Main round	—	34–27	39–28	40–34
2	(Romania) CS Dinamo București	6	2	1	3	170	171	−1	5	Main round	22–36	—	37–23	23–27
3	(Denmark) SAH Aarhus	6	2	1	3	177	193	−16	5	Transfer to EHF European League	27–30	25–25	—	36–32
4	(France) Montpellier Handball	6	1	0	5	176	201	−25	2	Transfer to EHF European League	27–28	26–36	30–38	—

Source: EHF
Rules for classification: Tiebreakers

=== Group F ===
Pos	Team	Pld	W	D	L	GF	GA	GD	Pts	Qualification	MAG	KIE	KRI	KOL
1	(Germany) SC Magdeburg	6	6	0	0	212	169	+43	12	Main round	—	30–27	36–29	37–22
2	(Poland) Industria Kielce	6	4	0	2	195	188	+7	8	Main round	30–35	—	30–29	40–35
3	(Switzerland) HC Kriens-Luzern	6	2	0	4	187	197	−10	4	Transfer to EHF European League	29–39	30–32	—	34–32
4	(Norway) Kolstad Håndball	6	0	0	6	178	218	−40	0	Transfer to EHF European League	32–35	29–36	28–36	—

Source: EHF
Rules for classification: Tiebreakers

== Main round ==
=== Group I ===
Pos	Team	Pld	W	D	L	GF	GA	GD	Pts	Qualification	VES	PAR	AAL	MEL	PLO	BER
1	(Hungary) One Veszprém HC	3	3	0	0	104	90	+14	6	Quarterfinals	—	24 Feb	26 Nov	2 Dec	10 Feb	39–35
2	(France) Paris Saint-Germain	3	2	1	0	100	91	+9	5	Quarterfinals	10 Dec	—	32–25	11 Feb	26 Nov	3 Mar
3	(Denmark) Aalborg Håndbold	3	1	1	1	92	96	−4	3	Quarterfinals	17 Feb	33–33	—	24 Feb	2 Dec	34–31
4	(Germany) MT Melsungen	3	1	0	2	85	86	−1	2	Quarterfinals	3 Mar	33–35	9 Dec	—	28–26	18 Feb
5	(Poland) Orlen Wisła Płock	3	1	0	2	77	82	−5	2	Transfer to EHF European League	26–30	18 Feb	4 Mar	25–24	—	10 Dec
6	(Germany) Füchse Berlin	3	0	0	3	95	108	−13	0		29–35	3 Dec	11 Feb	26 Nov	24 Feb	—

Updated to match(es) played on 19 November 2026. Source: EHF
Rules for classification: Tiebreakers

=== Group II ===
Pos	Team	Pld	W	D	L	GF	GA	GD	Pts	Qualification	BAR	SPO	MAG	GOG	KIE	BUC
1	(Spain) Barça	3	3	0	0	102	73	+29	6	Quarterfinals	—	11 Feb	9 Dec	26 Nov	4 Mar	34–27
2	(Portugal) Sporting CP	3	3	0	0	116	95	+21	6	Quarterfinals	3 Dec	—	3 Mar	43–33	18 Feb	36–27
3	(Germany) SC Magdeburg	3	3	0	0	101	92	+9	6	Quarterfinals	24 Feb	25 Nov	—	10 Feb	30–27	2 Dec
4	(Denmark) GOG	3	0	0	3	103	116	−13	0	Quarterfinals	18 Feb	35–37	35–36	—	2 Dec	4 Mar
5	(Poland) Industria Kielce	3	0	0	3	81	97	−16	0	Transfer to EHF European League	24–32	9 Dec	30–35	25 Feb	—	11 Feb
6	(Romania) CS Dinamo București	3	0	0	3	76	106	−30	0		22–36	25 Feb	17 Feb	10 Dec	25 Nov	—

Updated to match(es) played on 19 November 2026. Source: EHF
Rules for classification: Tiebreakers

== Knockout stage ==
=== Quarterfinals ===
Team 1	Agg.	Team 2	1st leg	2nd leg
B4	–	A1	24–25 Mar	31 Mar – 1 Apr
A4	–	B1	24–25 Mar	31 Mar – 1 Apr
B3	–	A2	24–25 Mar	31 Mar – 1 Apr
A3	–	B2	24–25 Mar	31 Mar – 1 Apr

=== Final four ===
The final four is scheduled to be held at the Lanxess Arena in Cologne, Germany in June 2027.

==== Bracket ====
Semi-finals
12 June
12 June

Final
13 June
Third place
13 June

==== Final ====
13 June 2027	WSF1	v	WSF2	Lanxess Arena, Cologne

== Statistics ==
As of 19 November 2026

=== Top goalscorers ===
Rank	Player	Club	Goals
1	(Denmark) Mathias Gidsel	(Germany) Füchse Berlin	73
2	(Portugal) Francisco Costa	(Portugal) Sporting CP	59
3	(Switzerland) Manuel Zehnder	(Denmark) GOG	50
4	(Portugal) Martim Costa	(Portugal) Sporting CP	49
5	(Slovenia) Aljuš Anžic	(Slovenia) RK Celje Pivovarna Laško	47
5	(Sweden) Simon Jeppsson	(Norway) Kolstad Håndball	47
7	(Faroe Islands) Óli Mittún	(Denmark) GOG	46
8	(France) Elohim Prandi	(France) Paris Saint-Germain	45
8	(Denmark) Frederik Bjerre	(Poland) Wisła Płock	45
10	(France) Hugo Descat	(Hungary) Veszprém KC	42

== See also ==
- 2026–27 EHF European League
- 2026–27 EHF European Cup
- 2026–27 Women's EHF Champions League
- 2026–27 Women's EHF European League
- 2026–27 Women's EHF European Cup
