= 2025–26 Superliga (men's handball) =

Polish Superliga
- Season: 2025–26
- Dates: 3 September 2025 – 7 June 2026
- Champions: Industria Kielce
- Relegated: Zagłębie Lubin
- Champions League: Industria Kielce; Orlen Wisła Płock
- European League: PGE Wybrzeże Gdańsk
- Matches: 156
- Goals: 9,308 (59.67 per match)
- Top goalscorer: Mikołaj Czapliński (184 goals)

The 2025–26 Superliga was the 70th season of the Polish Superliga, the top men's handball league in Poland. A total of thirteen teams contested this season's league, which began on 31 August 2025 and concluded on 2 June 2026.

Orlen Wisła Płock was the defending champion.

== Teams ==
Location of the 2025–26 Superliga teams.
- The following teams will compete in the Superliga during the 2025–26 season:

	Team	Arena	Capacity
1	Orlen Wisła Płock	Orlen Arena	5,492
2	Industria Kielce	Hala Legionów	4,200
3	Rebud KPR Ostrovia	Arena Ostrów	2,500
5	KGHM Chrobry Głogów	HWS Głogów	2,500
6	PGE Wybrzeże Gdańsk	HWS AWFiS Gdańsk	1,700
7	Corotop Gwardia Opole	Stegu Arena	3,378
8	Netland MKS Kalisz	Arena Kalisz	3,164
9	Energa Bank PBS MMTS Kwidzyn	KWS KCSiR	1,504
10	Zagłębie Lubin	HWS RCS Lubin	3,714
11	LOTTO-Puławy	Hala MOSiR Puławy	3,362
12	Piotrkowianin Piotrków Trybunalski	Hala Relax	1,000
13	Zepter KPR Legionowo	Arena Legionowo	1,998
CL	Stal Mielec	Hala SW MOSiR	2,200

== Regular season ==
=== Standings ===
Pos	Team	Pld	W	OTW	OTL	L	GF	GA	GD	Pts	Qualification or relegation
1	Orlen Wisła Płock	24	23	1	0	0	866	577	+289	71	Quarterfinals
2	Industria Kielce	24	22	0	1	1	938	620	+318	67	Quarterfinals
3	Rebud KPR Ostrovia Ostrów Wielkopolski	24	16	0	1	7	690	645	+45	49	Quarterfinals
4	PGE Wybrzeże Gdańsk	24	15	1	1	7	787	734	+53	48	Quarterfinals
5	KGHM Chrobry Głogów	24	14	0	0	10	686	697	−11	42	Quarterfinals
6	Energa Bank PBS MMTS Kwidzyn	24	11	2	1	10	712	737	−25	38	Quarterfinals
7	Netland MKS Kalisz	24	11	0	1	12	678	707	−29	34	Quarterfinals
8	Stal Mielec	24	9	1	2	12	633	712	−79	31	Quarterfinals
9	Zepter KPR Legionowo	24	9	1	1	13	662	680	−18	30	Relegation round
10	Corotop Gwardia Opole	24	9	0	0	15	672	726	−54	27	Relegation round
11	Piotrkowianin Piotrków Trybunalski	24	3	1	2	18	636	782	−146	13	Relegation round
12	LOTTO-Puławy	24	2	2	0	20	686	884	−198	10	Relegation round
13	Zagłębie Lubin	24	1	2	1	20	662	807	−145	8	Relegation round

Source: Orlen Superliga

=== Results ===
Home \ Away	PUL	GLO	KIE	KAL	OPO	KWI	LEG	PLO	OST	PIO	MIE	GDA	LUB
LOTTO-Puławy		32–34	30–46	30–34	26–34	35–43	26–36	23–41	32–36	30–29	28–31	31–42	32–31
KGHM Chrobry Głogów	39–28		23–37	27–25	28–27	30–29	31–27	25–33	32–31	34–25	30–25	25–26	27–26
Industria Kielce	49–29	37–25		43–26	48–26	38–23	38–28	27–32	37–30	35–27	41–25	45–31	43–26
Netland MKS Kalisz	37–27	32–26	27–38		29–31	32–31	25–24	28–41	21–28	32–23	27–24	34–41	28–25
Corotop Gwardia Opole	38–27	22–26	19–33	23–25		31–34	28–33	27–37	21–29	27–25	25–20	34–26	28–25
Energa Bank PBS MMTS Kwidzyn	35–30	27–26	25–38	30–29	22–29		31–26	26–37	31–26	36–32	29–30	35–34	34–33
Zepter KPR Legionowo	41–24	20–25	21–34	28–27	40–35	26–24		21–33	20–25	32–24	25–27	31–33	36–22
Orlen Wisła Płock	42–25	36–24	32–31	37–27	36–22	38–28	34–18		37–22	34–21	38–24	35–30	46–26
Rebud KPR Ostrovia Ostrów Wielkopolski	38–23	30–26	24–38	25–23	37–27	30–28	28–24	25–29		35–29	22–27	28–27	30–22
Piotrkowianin Piotrków Trybunalski	34–31	29–36	22–41	22–30	27–26	28–29	30–33	18–40	21–29		27–31	28–35	36–38
Stal Mielec	28–29	28–27	27–41	28–24	25–31	27–30	27–23	16–34	21–28	32–34		30–37	27–26
PGE Wybrzeże Gdańsk	39–32	37–30	22–38	31–35	28–25	28–30	34–26	24–31	34–33	34–18	35–29		35–30
Zagłębie Lubin	31–33	28–30	24–45	30–26	30–36	34–32	24–31	22–37	23–28	33–37	31–33	32–45	

Source: PGNiG Superliga
Legend: Blue = home team win; Red = away team win.
Matches with lighter background shading were decided after overtime.

== Relegation round ==
=== Standings ===
Pos	Team	Pld	W	OTW	OTL	L	GF	GA	GD	Pts	Qualification or relegation
9	Zepter KPR Legionowo	28	13	1	1	13	796	776	+20	42	
10	Corotop Gwardia Opole	28	12	0	0	16	794	839	−45	36	
11	Piotrkowianin Piotrków Trybunalski	28	4	1	2	21	754	915	−161	16	
12	Azoty Puławy	28	3	2	0	23	811	1026	−215	13	
13	Zagłębie Lubin	28	2	2	1	23	778	938	−160	11	Relegated to Central League

Source: Orlen Superliga

== Play-offs ==
Fifth place
5	KGHM Chrobry Głogów	28
7	Netland MKS Kalisz	33
Seventh place
6	Energa Bank PBS MMTS Kwidzyn	30
8	Stal Mielec	26

5th–8th classification
8	Stal Mielec	22
5	KGHM Chrobry Głogów	28
7	Netland MKS Kalisz	35
6	Energa Bank PBS MMTS Kwidzyn	28

Quarter-finals
1	Orlen Wisła Płock	35	30	65
8	Stal Mielec	23	22	45
4	PGE Wybrzeże Gdańsk	33	36	69
5	KGHM Chrobry Głogów	25	34	59
2	Industria Kielce	37	40	77
7	Netland MKS Kalisz	21	24	45
3	Rebud KPR Ostrovia Ostrów Wielkopolski	31	27	58
6	Energa Bank PBS MMTS Kwidzyn	23	33	56

Semi-finals
1	Orlen Wisła Płock	32	38	70
4	PGE Wybrzeże Gdańsk	21	18	39
2	Industria Kielce	34	30	64
3	Rebud KPR Ostrovia Ostrów Wielkopolski	26	23	49

Final
1	Orlen Wisła Płock	25	27	—	0
2	Industria Kielce	30	36	—	2
Third place game
4	PGE Wybrzeże Gdańsk	28 (7)	33	—	61
3	Rebud KPR Ostrovia Ostrów Wielkopolski	28 (6)	24	—	52

== Top goalscorers ==
Rank	Player	Club	Goals
1	(Poland) Mikołaj Czapliński	PGE Wybrzeże Gdańsk	184
2	(Poland) Mateusz Chabior	Zepter KPR Legionowo	159
3	(Serbia) Jovan Milićević	MMTS Kwidzyn	151
4	(Poland) Kamil Adamski	Rebud Ostrovia	148
4	(Ukraine) Rostyslav Polishchuk	Netland MKS Kalisz	148
6	(Poland) Patryk Grzesik	Piotrkowianin Piotrków Trybunalski	146
7	(Poland) Piotr Jarosiewicz	Industria Kielce	133
8	(Poland) Mateusz Wojdan	Corotop Gwardia Opole	130
9	(Poland) Krzysztof Komarzewski	LOTTO-Puławy	129
10	(France) Melvyn Richardson	Orlen Wisła Płock	125

== Final standings ==
Qualified for the 2026–27 EHF Champions League
Qualified for the 2026–27 EHF European League
Qualified for the 2026–27 EHF European Cup
Relegation to the Central League

Rank	Team
1	Industria Kielce
2	Orlen Wisła Płock
3	PGE Wybrzeże Gdańsk
4	Rebud KPR Ostrovia Ostrów Wielkopolski
5	Netland MKS Kalisz
6	KGHM Chrobry Głogów
7	Energa Bank PBS MMTS Kwidzyn
8	Stal Mielec
9	Zepter KPR Legionowo
10	Corotop Gwardia Opole
11	Piotrkowianin Piotrków Trybunalski
12	Azoty Puławy
13	Zagłębie Lubin
