= Kolporter Korona Kielce =

Kolporter Korona Kielce may refer to:

- Korona Kielce, men's Polish football team
- The former name of KS Iskra Kielce, Polish handball team
