= 2026–27 EHF Champions League knockout stage =

Handball tournament stage

The 2026–27 EHF Champions League knockout stage is scheduled to be played after the completion of the 2026–27 EHF Champions League main round to determine the four teams advancing to the final four of the 2026–27 EHF Champions League.

== Format ==
The knockout stage consists of the quarter-finals and the final four. The teams ranked first to fourth in each main round group qualify for the quarter-finals. The winners of the quarter-finals advance to the final four.

== Qualified teams ==
The top four teams from Groups A and B qualify for the knockout stage.

| Group | First place | Second place | Third place | Fourth place | TBD |
|---|---|---|---|---|---|
| A | | | | | |
| B | | | | | |

== Quarter-finals ==
The quarter-final pairings and match dates will be confirmed after the completion of the main round.

=== Overview ===
| Team 1 | Agg. | Team 2 | 1st leg | 2nd leg |
|---|---|---|---|---|
| B4 | – | A1 | 24–25 Mar | 31 Mar – 1 Apr |
| A4 | – | B1 | 24–25 Mar | 31 Mar – 1 Apr |
| B3 | – | A2 | 24–25 Mar | 31 Mar – 1 Apr |
| A3 | – | B2 | 24–25 Mar | 31 Mar – 1 Apr |

==== Matches ====
| 24–25 March 2027 | B4 | v | A1 |

| 31 March – 1 April 2027 | A1 | v | B4 |

| 24–25 March 2027 | A4 | v | B1 |

| 31 March – 1 April 2027 | B1 | v | A4 |

| 24–25 March 2027 | B3 | v | A2 |

| 31 March – 1 April 2027 | A2 | v | B3 |

| 24–25 March 2027 | A3 | v | B2 |

| 31 March – 1 April 2027 | B2 | v | A3 |

== Final four ==
The final four is scheduled to be held at the Lanxess Arena in Cologne, Germany, on 12 and 13 June 2027.

=== Bracket ===
Semi-finals
12 June
12 June

Final
13 June
Third place
13 June

=== Semifinals ===
| 12 June 2027 | TBD | v | TBD | Lanxess Arena, Cologne |

| 12 June 2027 | TBD | v | TBD | Lanxess Arena, Cologne |

=== Third place game ===
| 13 June 2027 | LSF1 | v | LSF2 | Lanxess Arena, Cologne |

=== Final ===
| 13 June 2027 | WSF1 | v | WSF2 | Lanxess Arena, Cologne |
