= Michał Olejniczak =

Polish handball player (born 2001)

Personal information
- Nationality: Polish
- Born: 31 January 2001 (age 25) Gorzów Wielkopolski, Poland
- Height: 1.93 m (6 ft 4 in)

Sport
- Sport: Handball
- Position: Centre back
- Current club: Industria Kielce
- Number: 5

Youth career
- Years: Team
- –2017: UKS Miś Gorzów Wielkopolski

Senior clubs
- Years: Team
- 2017–2020: SMS Gdańsk
- 2020–: Industria Kielce
National team
Years	Team	Apps	(Gls)
2018–	Poland	82	(154)
- Updated on 12 Januar 2026

Michał Olejniczak (born 31 January 2001) is a Polish handball player for Industria Kielce and the Polish national team.

He represented Poland at the 2020 European Men's Handball Championship.
