= Łukasz Rogulski =

Polish handball player (born 1993)

Personal information
- Nationality: Polish
- Born: 10 June 1993 (age 33) Olsztyn, Poland
- Height: 1.93 m (6 ft 4 in)

Sport
- Sport: Handball
- Position: Pivot
- Current club: Industria Kielce
- Number: 93

Youth career
- Years: Team
- –2009: Szczypiorniak Olsztyn

Senior clubs
- Years: Team
- 2009–2012: SMS Gdańsk
- 2012–2018: Wybrzeże Gdańsk
- 2018–2022: KS Azoty-Puławy
- 2022–2023: AEK Athens
- 2023–2024: CSM Bacău
- 2024–: Industria Kielce
National team
Years	Team	Apps	(Gls)
2017–	Poland	3	(1)

Łukasz Rogulski (born 10 June 1993) is a Polish handball player who plays for Industria Kielce and the Polish national team.
