= Piotr Jarosiewicz =

Polish handball player (born 1998)

Personal information
- Nationality: Polish
- Born: 28 June 1998 (age 28) Lębork, Poland
- Height: 1.78 m (5 ft 10 in)

Sport
- Sport: Handball
- Position: Left wing
- Current club: Industria Kielce
- Number: 98

Youth career
- Years: Team
- –2014: Agrykola Warszawa

Senior clubs
- Years: Team
- 2014–2017: SMS Gdańsk
- 2017–2025: KS Azoty-Puławy
- 2025–: Industria Kielce
National team
Years	Team	Apps	(Gls)
2018–	Poland	30	(41)
- Updated on 16 January 2026

Piotr Jarosiewicz (born 28 June 1998) is a Polish handball player for Industria Kielce and the Polish national team.

He represented Poland at the 2020 European Men's Handball Championship.
