= Dawid Dawydzik =

Polish handball player (born 1994)

Personal information
- Nationality: Polish
- Born: 7 December 1994 (age 31) Legnica, Poland
- Height: 2.00 m (6 ft 7 in)

Sport
- Sport: Handball
- Position: Pivot
- Current club: Wisła Płock
- Number: 33

Senior clubs
- Years: Team
- –2014: Dziewiątka Legnica
- 2014–2016: Żagiew Dzierżoniów
- 2016–2017: Śląsk Wrocław
- 2017–2019: Zagłębie Lubin
- 2019–2022: KS Azoty-Puławy
- 2022–: Wisła Płock
National team
Years	Team	Apps	(Gls)
2018–	Poland	57	(75)
- Updated on 16 January 2026

Dawid Dawydzik (born 7 December 1994) is a Polish handball player for Wisła Płock and the Polish national team.

He represented Poland at the 2020 European Men's Handball Championship.
