= Aleks Vlah =

Slovenian handballer (born 1997)

Personal information
- Nationality: Slovenian
- Born: 22 July 1997 (age 29) Izola, Slovenia
- Height: 1.91 m (6 ft 3 in)

Sport
- Sport: Handball
- Position: Centre back / left back
- Current club: Industria Kielce
- Number: 88

Youth career
- Years: Team
- –2013: RK Cimos Koper

Senior clubs
- Years: Team
- 2013–2019: RD Koper
- 2019–2021: RK Zagreb
- 2021–2023: RK Celje
- 2023–2025: Aalborg Håndbold
- 2025–: Industria Kielce
National team
Years	Team	Apps	(Gls)
2017–	Slovenia	68	(294)
- Updated on 24 January 2026

Aleks Vlah (born 22 July 1997) is a Slovenian handball player who plays for Industria Kielce and the Slovenia national team.

Vlah represented Slovenia at the 2023 World Men's Handball Championship, where he was the team's top scorer with 31 goals in 6 matches.

== Career ==
In February 2023, Vlah signed a three-year contract with Danish club Aalborg Håndbold.

In 2025, he won the Danish Cup with Aalborg Håndbold, beating Bjerringbro-Silkeborg in the final. With the team, he also won the Danish championship in the same season.
