= Simon Jeppsson =

Swedish handball player (born 1995)

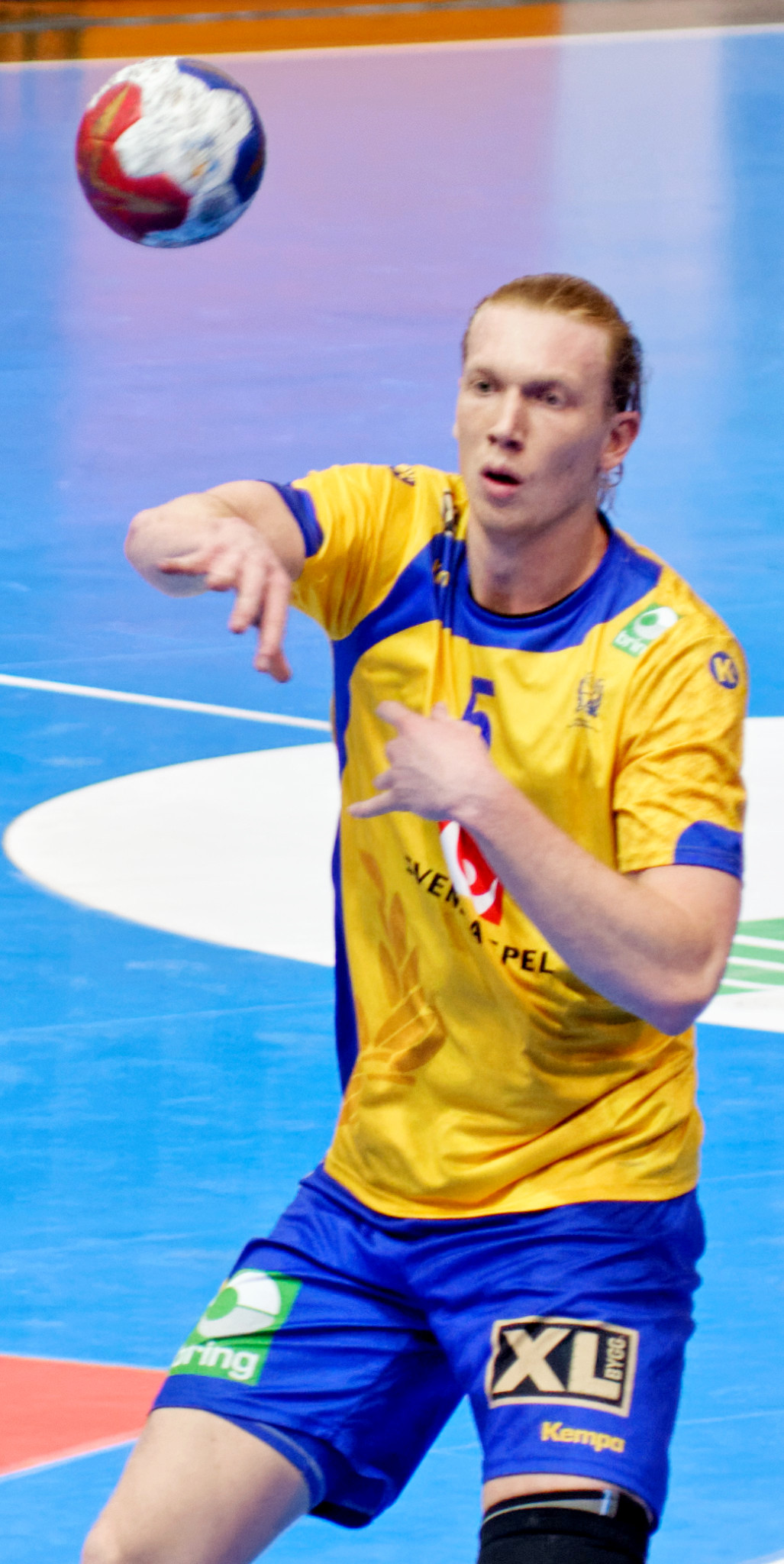
- Jeppsson in 2017

Personal information
- Nationality: Swedish
- Born: 15 July 1995 (age 31) Lund, Sweden
- Height: 2.03 m (6 ft 8 in)

Sport
- Sport: Handball
- Position: Left back
- Current club: Kolstad Håndball
- Number: 22

Senior clubs
- Years: Team
- –2017: Lugi HF
- 2017–2020: SG Flensburg-Handewitt
- 2020–2024: HC Erlangen
- 2024–: Kolstad Håndball
National team
Years	Team	Apps	(Gls)
2016–	Sweden	63	(114)
Medal record
European Championship
Silver medal – second place	2018 Croatia
- Updated on 23 August 2025

Simon Jeppsson (born 15 July 1995) is a Swedish handball player for Kolstad Håndball and the Swedish national team.

== National team ==
He made his debut for the Swedish national team on 3 November 2016 against Montenegro. He participated at the 2017 World Men's Handball Championship.

== Career ==
Jeppsson started his career at Lugi HF. In 2017 he joined German club SG Flensburg-Handewitt on a three year contract. With them he won the German Championship in 2018 and 2019.

When his contract with Flensburg-Handewitt ran out, he joined HC Erlangen.

In 2024 he joined Norwegian club Kolstad Håndball. In 2025 he extended his contract at the club. He won the Norwegian Championship in both 2025 and 2026 with Kolstad.
