= Hjalte Lykke =

Danish handball player (born 2000)

Personal information
- Nationality: Danish
- Born: 5 October 2004 (age 22) Aarhus, Denmark
- Height: 1.80 m (5 ft 11 in)

Sport
- Sport: Handball
- Position: Right back
- Current club: GOG Håndbold
- Number: 29

Youth career
- Years: Team
- –: HEI Håndbold
- –: GOG Håndbold

Senior clubs
- Years: Team
- 2021–: GOG Håndbold
National team
Years	Team	Apps	(Gls)
2025–	Denmark	3	(4)
- Updated on 30 December 2025

Hjalte Lykke (born 5 October 2004) is a Danish handball player for GOG Håndbold and the Danish national team.

== Career ==
Lykke played as a junior for HEI Håndbold. In December 2021 he had his official debut in the Danish Men's Handball League for GOG Håndbold. On 17 December 2025, he extended the contract with GOG Håndbold until 2029.

He made his debut for the Danish national team on 30 October 2025.
