= Théo Monar =

French handball player (born 2001)

Personal information
- Nationality: French
- Born: 6 June 2001 (age 25) Fort-de-France, Martinique
- Height: 1.98 m (6 ft 6 in)

Sport
- Sport: Handball
- Position: Pivot
- Current club: Industria Kielce
- Number: 97

Youth career
- Years: Team
- –: La Rochelle-Périgny
- –2017: PE de Poitiers
- 2017–2020: HBC Nantes

Senior clubs
- Years: Team
- 2020–2024: HBC Nantes
- 2024–: Industria Kielce
National team
Years	Team	Apps	(Gls)
2021–	France	13	(28)

Théo Monar (born 6 June 2001) is a French handball player for Industria Kielce and the French national team.
