= Orlen Arena =

Sports venue in Płock, Poland

- Orlen Arena

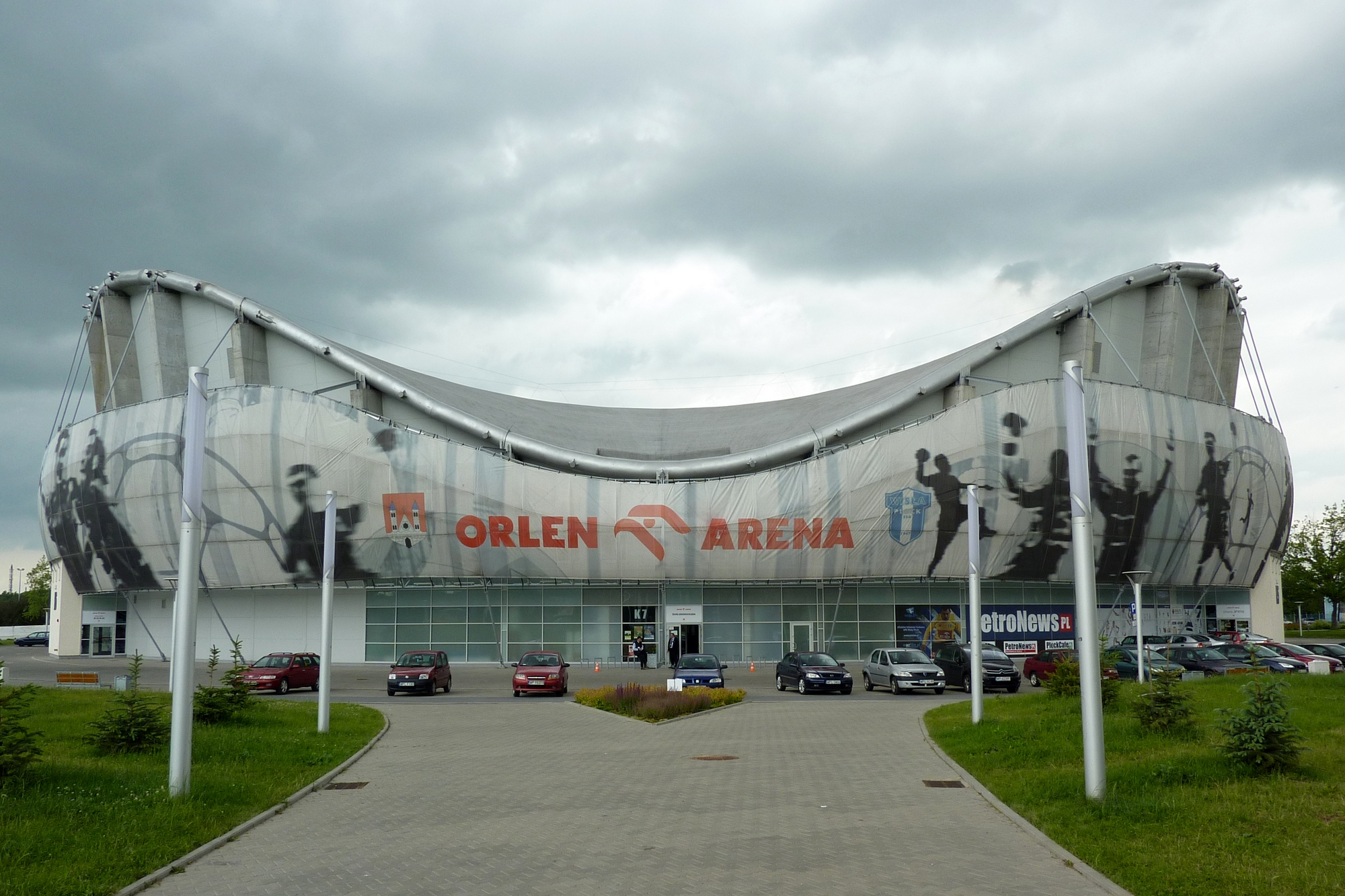
- Interactive map of Orlen Arena
- Full name: Orlen Arena Płock
- Location: Płock, Poland
- Coordinates: 52°33′36″N 19°41′01″E
- Owner: City of Płock
- Operator: Centrum Widowiskowo-Sportowe
- Capacity: Handball: 5,492; Concerts: 8,000
- Field size: 50mx30m

Construction
- Built: 8 April 2009 – 7 November 2010
- Opened: 13 November 2010
- Cost: zl 120 million.
- Architect: MCD Poznan
- Project manager: Henryk Nowacki
- General contractor: Vectra SA

Tenant
- Wisła Płock

Orlen Arena is an indoor arena in Płock, Poland. It opened on 13 November 2010, and holds 5,492 people.

It is located the Celebra Papieska Square, adjacent to Kazimierz Górski Stadium and is primarily used for handball, volleyball, basketball, tennis, table tennis, mixed martial arts, popular music and concerts. Orlen is the titular sponsor of the venue.

== Capacity ==
Permanent seating includes 5,029 places, a set of VIP lounges with 224 places, a journalist area with 100 places and another 28 places for the handicapped. Temporary seating for an additional 111 places can also be installed. The total capacity of the arena is 5492 places.

== Events ==
=== Handball ===
The arena is the permanent home of the Wisła Płock. It will also be the host of the President's Cup for 2023 World Men's Handball Championship.

=== MMA ===
The arena has hosted a number of KSW mixed martial arts events.

=== Music ===
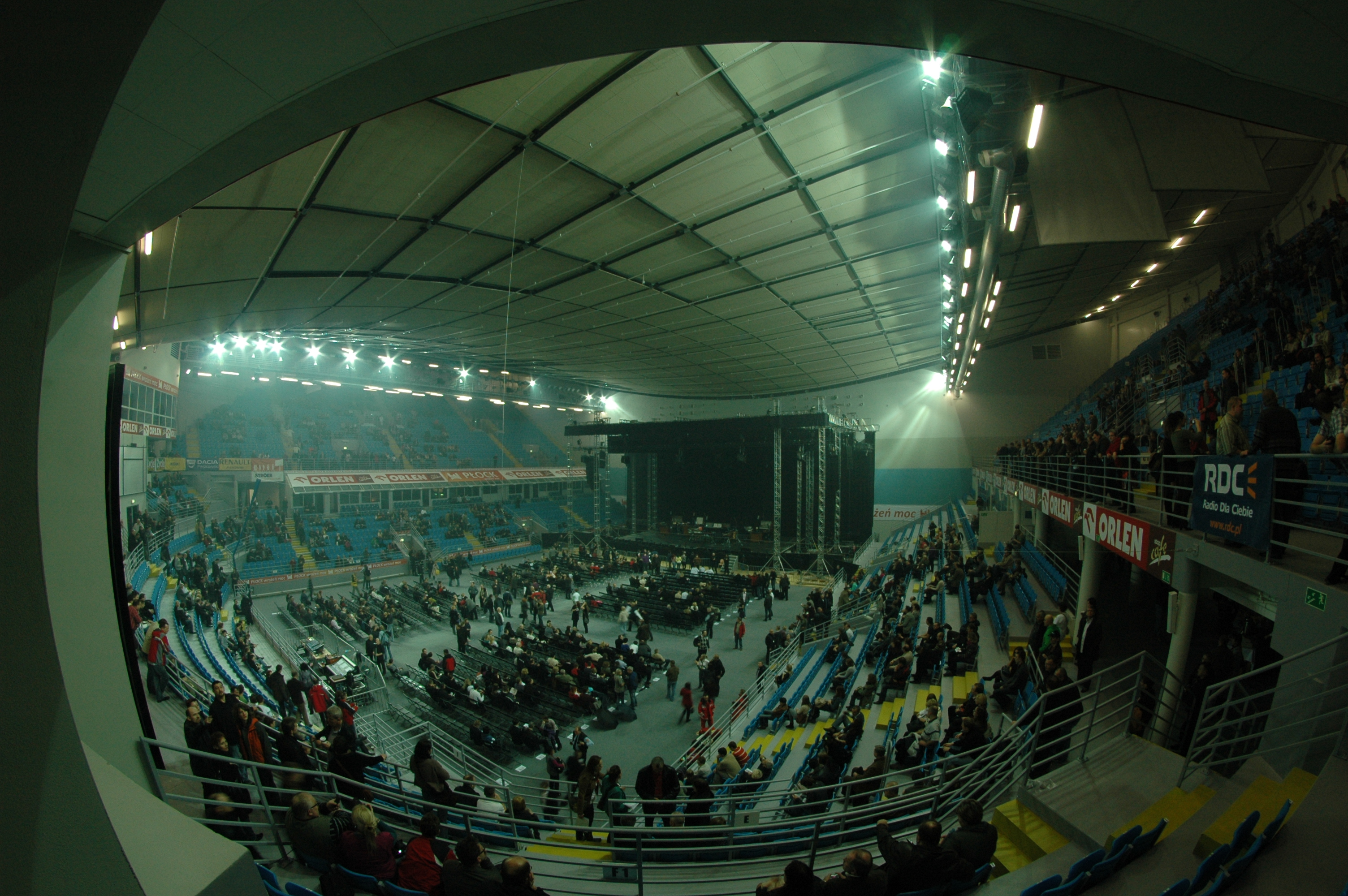
The official inauguration of the hall on 13 November 2010 with a concert by Jean-Michel Jarre.

Jean-Michel Jarre played at the inauguration of arena on 13 November 2010.

== See also ==
- List of indoor arenas in Poland
- Sport in Poland
