= Francisco Costa (handballer) =

Portuguese handball player (born 2005)

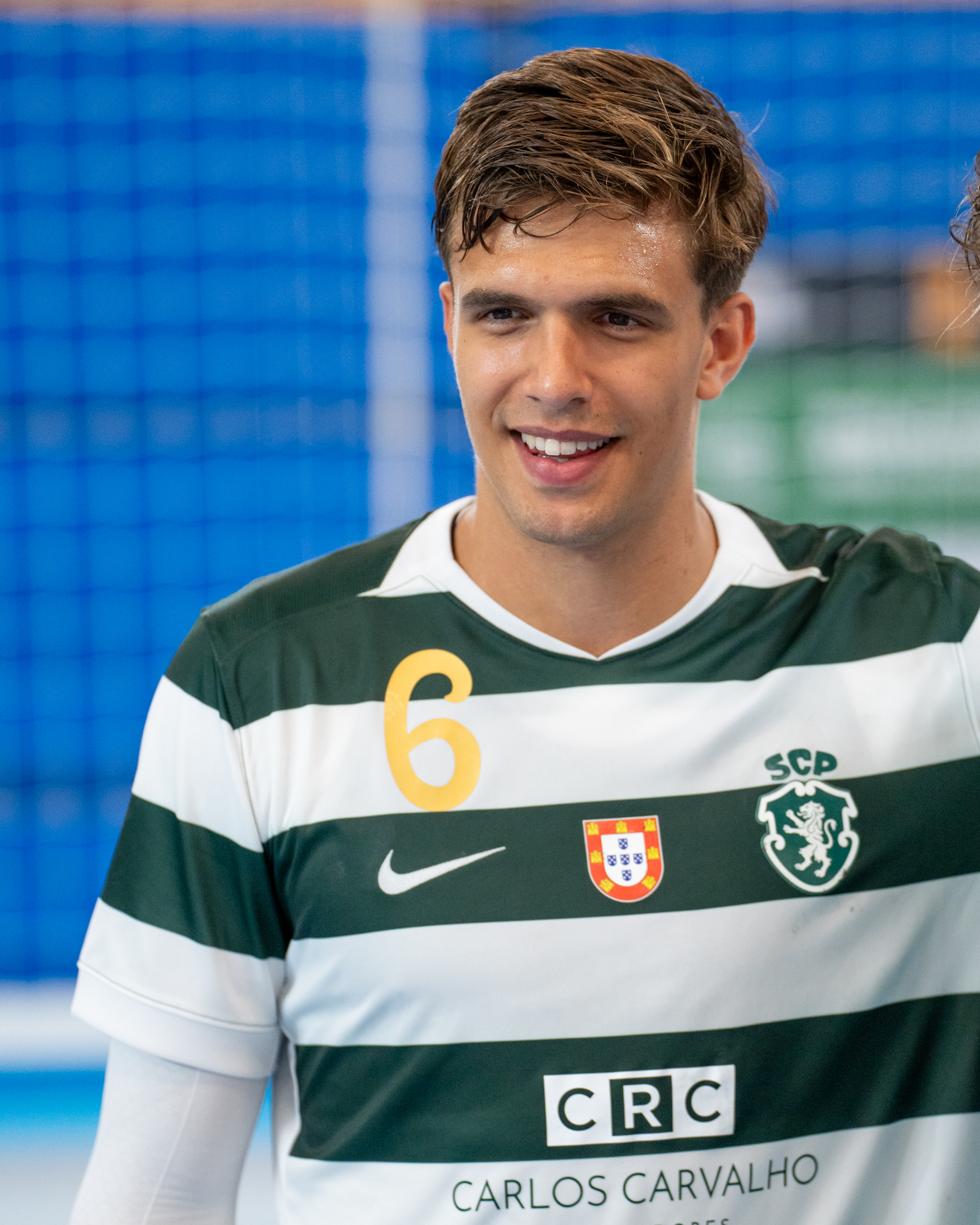

Personal information
- Full name: Francisco Mota da Costa
- Born: 16 February 2005 (age 21) Porto, Portugal
- Height: 1.89 m (6 ft 2 in)

Sport
- Sport: Handball
- Position: Right back
- Current club: Sporting CP
- Number: 6

Youth career
- Years: Team
- 2011–2019: Colégio dos Carvalhos
- 2019–2020: CIC sénior

Senior clubs
- Years: Team
- 2020–2021: FC Porto
- 2021: → A.A. Avanca (loan)
- 2021–: Sporting CP
National team
Years	Team	Apps	(Gls)
2022–	Portugal	44	(184)
Medal record
Junior European Championship
Silver medal – second place	2022 Portugal
- Updated on 14 January 2026

Francisco Mota da Costa (born 16 February 2005) is a Portuguese handball player for Sporting CP and the Portuguese national team. He is also known by his nickname Kiko Costa.

Costa also plays beach handball.

== Career ==
Costa started playing handball at Colégio dos Carvalhos, a private school south of Porto together with his brother, Martim Costa.

In 2019 he joined the youth team of FC Gaia, a club from his home town.

After a year he joined FC Porto. In the first season he played three matches for the first team, but otherwise he played for the second team in the Andebol B league.

In the last half of the 2020–21 season he was loaned to A.A. Avanca.

From the 2021–22 onwards he played with his older brother on Sporting CP, which was coached by his father, Ricardo Costa. In 2022 and 2023 he won the Portuguese Cup with Sporting. In the 2022–23 season he was also named best player in the Portuguese division. In December 2023 he also won the Portuguese Super Cup.

In the 2023–24 season he won his first Portuguese Championship, and was with 146 goals the top scorer in the main round. In June 2024 he won the Portuguese Cup, completing the domestic treble.

He was named the 2025 IHF Young male player of the year.

=== National team ===
Costa debuted for the Portuguese national team in a World Cup qualification match against Netherlands in the same match as his brother. After losing the home match 30:33, Portugal won 35:28 and secured the qualification.

His first major international tournament was the 2023 World Men's Handball Championship, where Portugal finished 13th. In 2025 he was part of the Portugal team that reached the semifinals of the World Championship for the first time in history. They lost the semifinals to Denmark and the third place playoff to France. At the 2026 European Men's Handball Championship he was part of the Portugal team that got 5th place, their best ever finish at a European Championship.

== Honours ==
Sporting CP

- Portuguese League
  - Champion: 2023–24
- Portuguese Cup
  - Winner: 2021–22, 2022–23, 2023–24
- Portuguese Super Cup
  - Winner: 2023, 2024

== Individual awards ==
- IHF Young male player of the year.
- Best young player of the World Championship: 2025
- All-Star Right Back of the European Championship: 2026
- Best Young Player of the European Championship: 2026
- All-Star right back of the European Under-20 Championship: 2022
- Top scorer of the European Under-20 Championship: 2022 (58 goals)
- All-Star right wing of the European Under-18 Championship: 2021
- Portuguese League MVP: 2023

== Personal life ==
He is the younger brother of handball player Martim Costa. His father, Ricardo Costa, is a former handball player and the coach of Sporting CP.
