= KS Iskra Kielce =

Polish handball club

Industria Kielce
- Full name: Klub Sportowy Iskra Kielce Spółka Akcyjna
- Short name: Iskra Kielce
- Founded: 1965; 61 years ago
- Arena: Hala Legionów
- Capacity: 4,200
- President: Karol Bielecki
- Head coach: Krzysztof Lijewski
- Captain: Artsem Karalek
- League: Polish Superliga
- 2025–26: Champions
- Club colours
Home	Away

KS Iskra Kielce SA, officially known for sponsorship reasons as Industria Kielce, and previously named Vive Kielce between 2002 and 2022, is a professional men's handball club based in Kielce in southeastern Poland. The club plays in the Polish Superliga and is a regular competitor of the EHF Champions League. It is the most successful Polish handball club based on the number of the league titles (21).

== History ==
The club was founded in 1965. It was promoted to the top division for he first time in 1975. They won their first title in 1985, the Polish Handball Cup.

Since 1984, the club has been playing at the highest level league of Polish handball, winning its first league title in 1993 (they finished the season with 44 points, 5 points more than one of their greatest contestants – Wisła Płock).

In 2019, it has become the most successful handball club in Poland, winning its 16th title and therefore beating the previous record holder, Śląsk Wrocław.

Throughout the years of its functioning, the club has managed to reach the final four of the Champions League five times, eventually winning the most prestigious handball competition in Europe in 2016. In the 2021-22 Champions League they reached the final again, this time losing to FC Barcelona.

In April 2026, legendary coach Talant Dujshebaev left the team after 12 years at the helm.

== Crest, colours, supporters ==
=== Kits ===
HOME

2025–26

AWAY

2025–26

== Honours ==
=== Domestic ===
- Polish Superliga

Winners (21): 1992–93, 1993–94, 1995–96, 1997–98, 1998–99, 2002–03, 2008–09, 2009–10, 2011–12, 2012–13, 2013–14, 2014–15, 2015–16, 2016–17, 2017–18, 2018–19, 2019–20, 2020–21, 2021–22, 2022–23, 2025–26

- Polish Cup

Winners (18): 1984–85, 1999–2000, 2002–03, 2003–04, 2005–06, 2008–09, 2009–10, 2010–11, 2011–12, 2012–13, 2013–14, 2014–15, 2015–16, 2016–17, 2017–18, 2018–19, 2020–21, 2024–25

=== International ===
- EHF Champions League

Winners: 2015–16
Silver: 2021–22, 2022–23
Bronze: 2012–13, 2014–15
Final four: 2018–19

- IHF Super Globe

Bronze: 2016, 2022

== Season by season ==
Season	Tier	League	Pos.
1984–85	1	Superliga	4
1985–86	1	Superliga	5
1986–87	1	Superliga	9
1987–88	1	Superliga	7
1988–89	1	Superliga	8
1989–90	1	Superliga	4
1990–91	1	Superliga	4
1991–92	1	Superliga	12
1992–93	1	Superliga	1
1993–94	1	Superliga	1
1994–95	1	Superliga	2
1995–96	1	Superliga	1
1996–97	1	Superliga	3
1997–98	1	Superliga	1
1998–99	1	Superliga	1
1999–00	1	Superliga	4
2000–01	1	Superliga	3
2001–02	1	Superliga	5
2002–03	1	Superliga	1
2003–04	1	Superliga	2
2004–05	1	Superliga	3

Season	Tier	League	Pos.
2005–06	1	Superliga	4
2006–07	1	Superliga	3
2007–08	1	Superliga	3
2008–09	1	Superliga	1
2009–10	1	Superliga	1
2010–11	1	Superliga	2
2011–12	1	Superliga	1
2012–13	1	Superliga	1
2013–14	1	Superliga	1
2014–15	1	Superliga	1
2015–16	1	Superliga	1
2016–17	1	Superliga	1
2017–18	1	Superliga	1
2018–19	1	Superliga	1
2019–20	1	Superliga	1
2020–21	1	Superliga	1
2021–22	1	Superliga	1
2022–23	1	Superliga	1
2023–24	1	Superliga	2
2024–25	1	Superliga	2
2025–26	1	Superliga	1

== European record ==
=== EHF Champions League ===
Season	Round	Club	Home	Away	Aggregate
2025–26	Group stage (Group A)	Kolstad Håndball	38–27	27–26	3rd place
2025–26	Group stage (Group A)	Sporting CP	39–33	36–41	3rd place
2025–26	Group stage (Group A)	Füchse Berlin	32–37	33–31	3rd place
2025–26	Group stage (Group A)	Veszprém	36–35	33–35	3rd place
2025–26	Group stage (Group A)	HBC Nantes	27–35	33–29	3rd place
2025–26	Group stage (Group A)	Dinamo București	34–32	28–24	3rd place
2025–26	Group stage (Group A)	Aalborg Håndbold	32–32	27–34	3rd place
2025–26	Playoffs	Szeged	32–32	23–26	55–58
2022–23	Group stage (Group B)	HBC Nantes	40–33	33–30	2nd place
2022–23	Group stage (Group B)	Barça	31–32	28–32	2nd place
2022–23	Group stage (Group B)	Aalborg Håndbold	33–28	30–28	2nd place
2022–23	Group stage (Group B)	THW Kiel	40–37	29–32	2nd place
2022–23	Group stage (Group B)	RK Celje	36–28	33–30	2nd place
2022–23	Group stage (Group B)	Pick Szeged	37–30	31–28	2nd place
2022–23	Group stage (Group B)	Elverum Håndball	37–33	27–26	2nd place
2022–23	1/4	Veszprém	31–27	29–29	60–56
2022–23	1/2	PSG	25–24		
2022–23	Final	SC Magdeburg	29–30		
2021–22	Group stage (Group B)	Dinamo București	34–29	29–32	1st place
2021–22	Group stage (Group B)	Veszprém	32–29	33–35	1st place
2021–22	Group stage (Group B)	Motor	33–27	26–25	1st place
2021–22	Group stage (Group B)	Flensburg	37–29	33–25	1st place
2021–22	Group stage (Group B)	FC Porto	39–33	27–29	1st place
2021–22	Group stage (Group B)	PSG	38–33	27–32	1st place
2021–22	Group stage (Group B)	Barça	29–27	32–30	1st place
2021–22	1/4	Montpellier Handball	30–22	31–28	61–50
2021–22	1/2	Veszprém	37–35		
2021–22	Final	Barça	35–37		
2020–21	Group stage (Group A)	Flensburg	28–31	30–31	3rd place
2020–21	Group stage (Group A)	MOL-Pick Szeged	26–23	30–26	3rd place
2020–21	Group stage (Group A)	Elverum Håndball	39–29	31–22	3rd place
2020–21	Group stage (Group A)	Meshkov Brest	34–27	30–35	3rd place
2020–21	Group stage (Group A)	PSG	35–33	26–37	3rd place
2020–21	Group stage (Group A)	FC Porto	32–30	32–32	3rd place
2020–21	Group stage (Group A)	Vardar 1961	36–29	33–29	3rd place
2020–21	Playoffs	HBC Nantes	31–34	25–24	56–58
2015–16	Group stage (Group B)	Pick Szeged	27–26	30–31	2nd place
2015–16	Group stage (Group B)	Montpellier Handball	30–23	32–27	2nd place
2015–16	Group stage (Group B)	RNL	28–27	32–32	2nd place
2015–16	Group stage (Group B)	IFK Kristianstad	35–27	35–35	2nd place
2015–16	Group stage (Group B)	Barça	30–30	33–31	2nd place
2015–16	Group stage (Group B)	RK Vardar	23–20	24–34	2nd place
2015–16	Group stage (Group B)	KIF Kolding	33–31	33–25	2nd place
2015–16	1/8	Meshkov Brest	33–30	32–28	65–58
2015–16	1/4	Flensburg	29–28	28–28	57–56
2015–16	1/2	PSG	28–26		
2015–16	Final	Veszprém	39–38		

== Team ==
=== Current squad ===
Squad for the 2026–27 season

Goalkeepers

- 1 (Poland) Adam Morawski
- 12 (Poland) Kacper Kaleta
- 96 (Serbia) Dejan Milosavljev

Left wingers

- 44 (Poland) Marcel Latosiński
- 98 (Poland) Piotr Jarosiewicz
- 99 (France) Dylan Nahi

Right wingers

- 11 (France) Benoît Kounkoud
- 23 (Poland) Arkadiusz Moryto

Line players

- 50 (Belarus) Artsem Karalek
- 97 (France) Théo Monar

Left backs

- 9 (Poland) Szymon Sićko
- 37 (Montenegro) Milorad Bakić
- 71 (Belarus) Kirill Rabchinski

Centre backs

- 4 (Poland) Piotr Jędraszczyk
- 5 (Poland) Michał Olejniczak
- 88 (Slovenia) Aleks Vlah

Right backs

- 2 (Nigeria) Faruk Yusuf]
- 10 (Croatia) Luka Lovre Klarica
- 13 (France) Julien Bos

=== Transfers ===
Transfers for the 2027–28 season

Joining

Leaving

=== Transfer history ===
Transfers for the 2026–27 season

Joining

- (Serbia) Dejan Milosavljev (GK) from (Germany) Füchse Berlin
- (France) Julien Bos (RB) from (France) HBC Nantes
- (Croatia) Luka Lovre Klarica (RB) from (Croatia) RK Zagreb
- (Montenegro) Milorad Bakić (LB) from (Sweden) Eskilstuna Guif
- (Belarus) Kirill Rabchinski (LB) from (Belarus) SKA Minsk
- (Poland) Kacper Kaleta (GK) (on loan from (Poland) KSZO Ostrowiec Świętokrzyski)
- (Nigeria) Faruk Yusuf (RB) back from loan at (France) Limoges Handball

Leaving

- (Spain) Alex Dujshebaev (RB) to (Germany) VfL Gummersbach
- (Spain) Daniel Dujshebaev (LB) to (Germany) MT Melsungen
- (Spain) Jorge Maqueda (RB) to (Spain) CB Caserío Ciudad Real
- (Slovenia) Klemen Ferlin (GK) to (Slovenia) RD Slovan
- (Bosnia and Herzegovina) Bekir Čordalija (GK) to (Serbia) RK Partizan
- (Poland) Łukasz Rogulski (LP) to (Romania) SCM Politehnica Timișoara

Transfers for the 2025–26 season

Joining

- (Slovenia) Aleks Vlah (CB) from (Denmark) Aalborg Håndbold
- (Poland) Nikodem Błażejewski (GK) back from loan at (Poland) Stal Mielec
- (Croatia) Sandro Meštrić (GK) back from loan at (Poland) Rebud KPR Ostrovia
- (Poland) Adam Morawski (GK) from (Germany) MT Melsungen
- (Poland) Piotr Jarosiewicz (LW) from (Poland) Azoty Puławy
- (Croatia) Halil Jaganjac (LB) back from loan at (Germany) Rhein-Neckar Löwen
- (Poland) Piotr Jędraszczyk (CB) back from loan at (Poland) Corotop Gwardia Opole

Leaving

- (Croatia) Igor Karačić CB) to (Croatia) RK Zagreb
- (Croatia) Sandro Meštrić (GK) to (Belarus) HC Meshkov Brest
- (Poland) Tomasz Gębala (LB) to Kuwait SC
- (Poland) Miłosz Wałach (GK) to (North Macedonia) RK Vardar 1961
- (Poland) Szymon Wiaderny (LW) to (Poland) Zepter KPR Legionowo
- (Poland) Cezary Surgiel (LW) to (Greece) Olympiacos
- (Croatia) Halil Jaganjac (LB) to (Germany) Rhein-Neckar Löwen
- (Poland) Nikodem Błażejewski (GK) to ?

== Naming conventions ==
- 1965–1973: Iskra Kielce
- 1973–1991: Korona Kielce
- 1991–1994: Iskra Kielce
- 1994–1996: Iskra/Ceresit Kielce
- 1996–1998: Iskra Kielce
- 1998–1999: Iskra Lider Market Kielce
- 2000–2000: Strzelec/Lider Market Kielce
- 2001–2002: Kolporter/Lider Market Kielce
- 2002–2002: Kolporter Kielce
- 2002–2009: Vive Kielce
- 2009–2014: Vive Targi Kielce
- 2014–2017: Vive Tauron Kielce
- 2017–2020: PGE Vive Kielce
- 2020–2022: Łomża Vive Kielce
- 2022–2022: Łomża Industria Kielce
- 2023–2023: Industria Kielce
- 2023–2023: Barlinek Industria Kielce
- 2023–: Industria Kielce

== See also ==
- Vive Kielce players
