= Frederik Bjerre =

Danish handball player (born 2000)

Personal information
- Full name: Frederik Friche Bjerre
- Nationality: Danish
- Born: 28 December 2000 (age 25) Hobro, Denmark
- Height: 185 cm (73 in)

Sport
- Sport: Handball
- Position: Left wing
- Current club: Wisła Płock
- Number: 66

Youth career
- Years: Team
- –2019: Hobro
- 2019–2020: Mors-Thy Håndbold

Senior clubs
- Years: Team
- 2020–2023: Mors-Thy Håndbold
- 2023–2025: TTH Holstebro
- 2025–2026: GOG Håndbold
- 2026–: Wisła Płock
National team
Years	Team	Apps	(Gls)
2026–	Denmark	1	(7)
- Updated on 20 March 2026

Frederik Friche Bjerre (born 28 December 2000) is a Danish handball player for Wisła Płock and the Danish national team.

== Career ==
Growing up in Hobro, Bjerre joined the youth academy of Mors-Thy Håndbold in 2019. After a year playing for the youth team, he was promoted to the first team in 2020. Here he played until 2023, when he joined TTH Holstebro.

In 2025 he joined GOG Håndbold. In February the following year it was announced that GOG had sold Frederik Bjerre to the Polish club Wisla Plock. He signed a 3-year deal with the club starting from the 2026–27 season. In his last season for GOG he broke the record for most goals in a single Danish league season with 283. He took the record from Nicolaj Jørgensen. The same season he was included in the Danish League all-star team.

=== National team ===
Bjerre played in total 5 matches for various Danish youth teams.

He was called up for the Danish senior national team for the first time in March 2026 for the Golden League. He made his debut for the team against Norway, and scored 7 goals during the match.
