= Wisła Płock (handball) =

Polish handball club

Orlen Wisła Płock
- Full name: Sekcja Piłki Ręcznej Wisła Płock Spółka Akcyjna
- Nickname: Nafciarze (The Oilers)
- Short name: Wisła Płock
- Founded: 1947 (club); 1964 (handball team)
- Arena: Orlen Arena
- Capacity: 5,492
- President: Artur Stanowski
- Head coach: Xavi Sabaté
- Captain: Michał Daszek
- League: Polish Superliga
- 2025–26: 2nd place
- Club colours
Home	Away

SPR Wisła Płock SA, competing for sponsorship reasons as Orlen Wisła Płock, is a professional men's handball club based in Płock in central Poland, founded in 1964. They compete in the Polish Superliga.

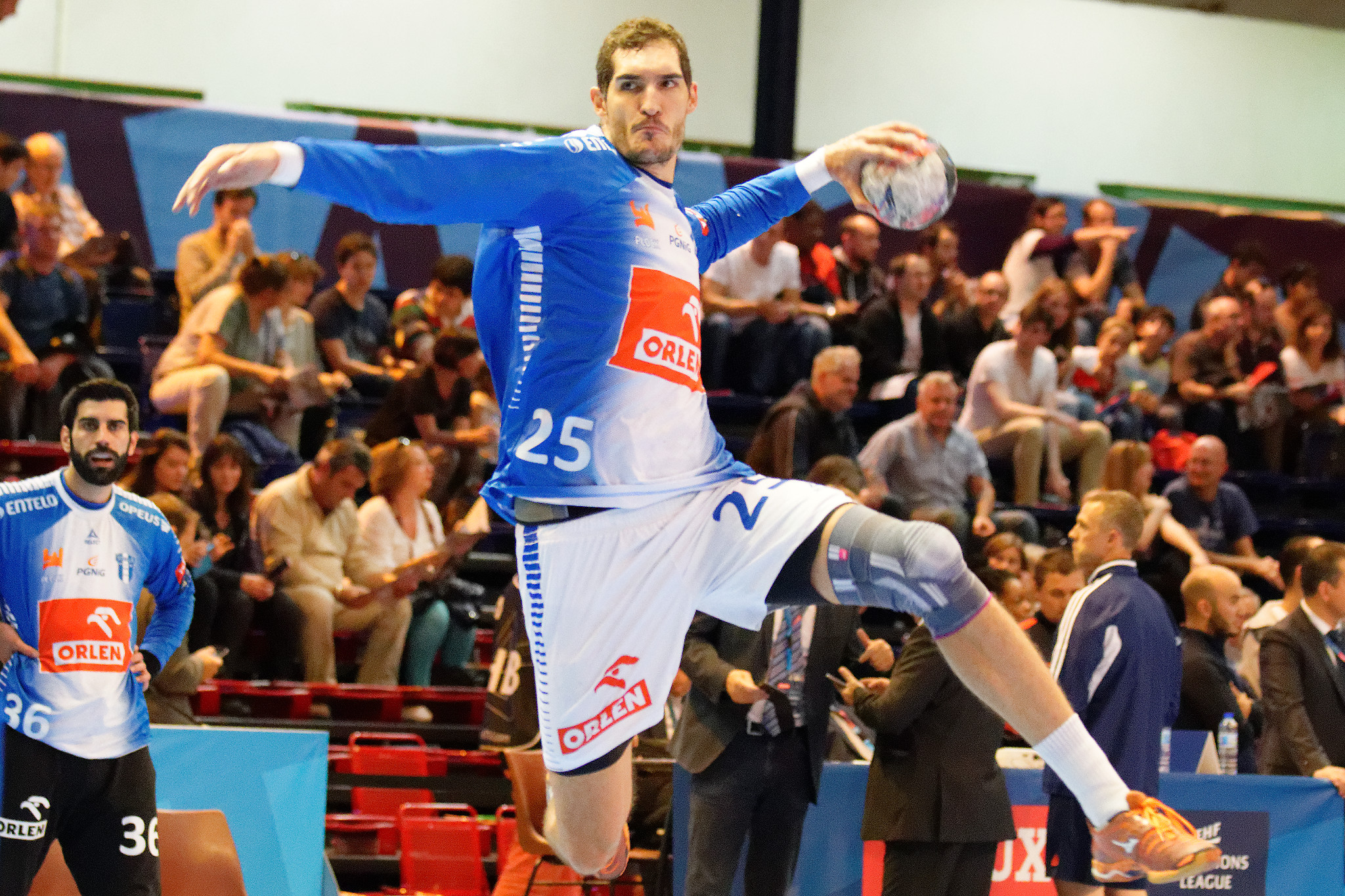
2015–16 EHF Champions League match with PSG

== Crest, colours, supporters ==
=== Kits ===
HOME
2023–24	2025-26

AWAY
2019–20	2020–23; 2024–25	2025-26

== Honours ==
=== Domestic ===
- Polish Superliga

Winners (9): 1994–95, 2001–02, 2003–04, 2004–05, 2005–06, 2007–08, 2010–11, 2023–24, 2024–25

- Polish Cup

Winners (14): 1991–92, 1994–95, 1995–96, 1996–97, 1997–98, 1998–99, 2000–01, 2004–05, 2006–07, 2007–08, 2021–22, 2022–23, 2023–24, 2025–26

=== International ===
- EHF European League

Bronze: 2021–22

== Former names ==
- Wisła Płock: (1964–1992)
- Petrochemia Płock: (1992–1999)
- Petro Płock: (1999–2000)
- Orlen Płock: (2000–2002)
- Wisła Płock: (2002–2010)
- SPR Wisła Płock: (2010–present)

== Season by season ==
Season	Tier	League	Pos.
1989–1990	1	Superliga	3
1990–1991	1	Superliga	3
1991–1992	1	Superliga	2
1992–1993	1	Superliga	2
1993–1994	1	Superliga	3
1994–1995	1	Superliga	1
1995–1996	1	Superliga	2
1996–1997	1	Superliga	2
1997–1998	1	Superliga	3
1998–1999	1	Superliga	2
1999–2000	1	Superliga	2
2000–2001	1	Superliga	2
2001–2002	1	Superliga	1
2002–2003	1	Superliga	2
2003–2004	1	Superliga	1
2004–2005	1	Superliga	1
2005–2006	1	Superliga	1
2006–2007	1	Superliga	2

Season	Tier	League	Pos.
2007–2008	1	Superliga	1
2008–2009	1	Superliga	2
2009–2010	1	Superliga	3
2010–2011	1	Superliga	1
2011–2012	1	Superliga	2
2012–2013	1	Superliga	2
2013–2014	1	Superliga	2
2014–2015	1	Superliga	2
2015–2016	1	Superliga	2
2016–2017	1	Superliga	2
2017–2018	1	Superliga	2
2018–2019	1	Superliga	2
2019–2020	1	Superliga	2
2020–2021	1	Superliga	2
2021–2022	1	Superliga	2
2022–2023	1	Superliga	2
2023–2024	1	Superliga	1
2024–2025	1	Superliga	1

== European record ==
=== EHF Champions League ===
Season	Round	Club	Home	Away	Aggregate
2025–26	Group stage (Group B)	Pick Szeged	30–30	34–33	3rd place
2025–26	Group stage (Group B)	RK Zagreb	30–27	34–26	3rd place
2025–26	Group stage (Group B)	SC Magdeburg	29–29	26–27	3rd place
2025–26	Group stage (Group B)	Eurofarm Pelister	36–25	28–25	3rd place
2025–26	Group stage (Group B)	PSG	35–32	30–29	3rd place
2025–26	Group stage (Group B)	Barça	24–34	24–30	3rd place
2025–26	Group stage (Group B)	GOG Håndbold	34–35	30–28	3rd place
2025–26	Playoffs	Sporting CP	28–27	29–33	57–60

== Team ==
=== Current squad ===
Squad for the 2026–27 season

Goalkeepers

- 16 (Slovenia) Miljan Vujović
- 32 (Croatia) Mirko Alilović

Left wingers

- 26 (Poland) Przemysław Krajewski
- 34 (Croatia) Lovro Mihić
- 66 (Denmark) Frederik Bjerre

Right wingers

- 3 (Poland) Michał Daszek
- 9 (Poland) Jakub Szyszko

Line players

- 17 (Spain) Abel Serdio
- 19 (Croatia) Leon Šušnja
- 20 (Spain) Oriol Rey Morales
- 33 (Poland) Dawid Dawydzik

Left backs

- 49 (Hungary) Zoltán Szita
- 99 (Russia) Sergei Kosorotov

Centre backs

- 8 (Slovenia) Mitja Janc
- 23 (Slovenia) Miha Zarabec
- 24 (Hungary) Gergő Fazekas
- 53 (Poland) Maksym Matyszczyk

Right backs

- 22 (France) Melvyn Richardson
- 43 (Hungary) Zoran Ilić

=== Transfers ===
Transfers for the 2026–27 season

Joining

- (Denmark) Frederik Bjerre (LW) from (Denmark) GOG Håndbold
- (Spain) Oriol Rey Morales (LP) from (North Macedonia) GRK Ohrid
- (Slovenia) Miljan Vujović (GK) on loan from (Slovenia) RD Slovan
- (Poland) Krystian Marchewka (CB) back from loan at (Poland) Stal Mielec

Leaving

- (Bosnia and Herzegovina) Mirsad Terzić (LB) (retires)
- (Norway) Torbjørn Bergerud (GK) to (Denmark) Fredericia HK
- (Belarus) Kiryl Samoila (LB) to (Slovenia) RD Slovan
- (Poland) Marcel Sroczyk (LW) to (Poland) MKS Kalisz
- (Poland) Igor Szafryna (LP) to (Poland) Gwardia Opole
- (Poland) Krystian Marchewka (CB) to (Poland) MMTS Kwidzyn
- (Poland) Wojciech Borucki (GK) loan back to (Poland) KS Azoty-Puławy

=== Transfer history ===
Transfers for the 2025–26 season

Joining

- (France) Melvyn Richardson (RB) from (Spain) FC Barcelona
- (Norway) Torbjørn Bergerud (GK) from (Norway) Kolstad Håndball
- (Russia) Sergei Kosorotov (LB) from (Hungary) Veszprém KC
- (Hungary) Zoran Ilić (RB) from (Germany) HSV Hamburg
- (Poland) Jakub Szyszko (RW) from (Poland) Górnik Zabrze
- (Poland) Wojciech Borucki (GK) on loan from (Poland) Azoty Puławy

Leaving

- (Iceland) Viktor Gísli Hallgrímsson (GK) to (Spain) FC Barcelona
- (Russia) Dmitry Zhitnikov (CB) to (Hungary) MOL Tatabánya KC
- (Czech Republic) Tomáš Piroch (RB) to (Germany) SC DHfK Leipzig
- (Croatia) Luka Stepančić (RB) to (Hungary) Győri ETO-UNI FKC
- (Bosnia and Herzegovina) Marko Panić (RB) to (Hungary) Budai Farkasok KKUK
- (Slovenia) Peter Šiško (LB) to (France) C' Chartres MHB
- (Slovenia) Tim Cokan (RW) to (Slovenia) RD Slovan
- (Poland) Marcel Jastrzębski (GK) on loan at (Croatia) RK Nexe Našice

== See also ==
- Wisła Płock players
