= 2025–26 EHF Champions League group stage =

The 2025–26 EHF Champions League group stage was played between 10 September 2025 and 12 March 2026 to determine the twelve teams advancing to the knockout stage of the 2025–26 EHF Champions League.

== Draw ==
The draw was held on 27 June 2025 in Vienna, Austria.

=== Seeding ===
The seeding was announced on 26 June 2025.

| Pot 1 | Pot 2 | Pot 3 |
|---|---|---|
| (Germany) Füchse Berlin (Spain) Barça (France) Paris Saint-Germain (Denmark) Aalborg Håndbold (Poland) Orlen Wisła Płock (Hungary) One Veszprém | (Germany) SC Magdeburg (France) HBC Nantes (Denmark) GOG Håndbold (Poland) Industria Kielce (Hungary) OTP Bank – Pick Szeged | (Romania) CS Dinamo București (Portugal) Sporting CP (Croatia) RK Zagreb (Norway) Kolstad Håndball (North Macedonia) RK Eurofarm Pelister |

== Format ==
In each group, teams played against each other in a double round-robin format, with home and away matches.

== Tiebreakers ==
In the group stage, teams were ranked according to points (2 points for a win, 1 point for a draw, 0 points for a loss). After completion of the group stage, if two or more teams had the same number of points, the ranking was determined as follows:

1. Highest number of points in matches between the teams directly involved;
2. Superior goal difference in matches between the teams directly involved;
3. Highest number of goals scored in matches between the teams directly involved;
4. Superior goal difference in all matches of the group;
5. Highest number of plus goals in all matches of the group;

If the ranking of one of these teams is determined, the above criteria are consecutively followed until the ranking of all teams is determined. If no ranking can be determined, a decision shall be obtained by EHF through drawing of lots.

== Groups ==
The matchdays were 10–11 September, 17–18 September, 24–25 September, 8–9 October, 15–16 October, 22–23 October, 12–13 November, 19–20 November, 26–27 November, 3–4 December 2025, 18–19 February, 25–26 February, 4–5 March, 11–12 March 2026.

Times up to 23 October 2025 UTC+2, times after are UTC+1.

=== Group A ===
| Pos | Team | Pld | W | D | L | GF | GA | GD | Pts | Qualification |
|---|---|---|---|---|---|---|---|---|---|---|
| 1 | (Germany) Füchse Berlin | 14 | 11 | 0 | 3 | 470 | 433 | +37 | 22 | Quarterfinals |
| 2 | (Denmark) Aalborg Håndbold | 14 | 10 | 1 | 3 | 457 | 407 | +50 | 21 | Quarterfinals |
| 3 | (Poland) Industria Kielce | 14 | 8 | 1 | 5 | 456 | 451 | +5 | 17 | Playoffs |
| 4 | (France) HBC Nantes | 14 | 8 | 0 | 6 | 456 | 416 | +40 | 16 | Playoffs |
| 5 | (Hungary) One Veszprém | 14 | 7 | 0 | 7 | 471 | 449 | +22 | 14 (Note: One Veszprém 64–64 Sporting CP. Veszprém ranked fifth because of the better overall goal difference.) | Playoffs |
| 6 | (Portugal) Sporting CP | 14 | 7 | 0 | 7 | 465 | 476 | −11 | 14 | Playoffs |
| 7 | (Romania) CS Dinamo București | 14 | 2 | 0 | 12 | 395 | 430 | −35 | 4 | |
| 8 | (Norway) Kolstad Håndball | 14 | 2 | 0 | 12 | 386 | 494 | −108 | 4 | |

Source: EHF
Rules for classification: Tiebreakers
Notes:

| 10 September 2025; 18:45 | Aalborg Håndbold (Denmark) | 32–28 | (Hungary) One Veszprém | Gigantium, Aalborg; Attendance: 5,423; Referees: Mitrevski, Todorovski (MKD) |
| 10 September 2025; 18:45 | Arnoldsen 6 | (17–15) | Remili 8 | Gigantium, Aalborg; Attendance: 5,423; Referees: Mitrevski, Todorovski (MKD) |
| 10 September 2025; 18:45 | 2× (yellow card) 2× (suspension) | Report | 2× (yellow card) 4× (suspension) | Gigantium, Aalborg; Attendance: 5,423; Referees: Mitrevski, Todorovski (MKD) |

| 10 September 2025; 18:45 | CS Dinamo București (Romania) | 30–33 | (Portugal) Sporting CP | Dinamo Polyvalent Hall, Bucharest; Attendance: 2,000; Referees: Erdoğan, Özdeniz (TUR) |
| 10 September 2025; 18:45 | Akimenko, Langaro 5 | (15–15) | F. Costa 8 | Dinamo Polyvalent Hall, Bucharest; Attendance: 2,000; Referees: Erdoğan, Özdeniz (TUR) |
| 10 September 2025; 18:45 | 1× (yellow card) 1× (suspension) 1× (red card) | Report | 1× (yellow card) 4× (suspension) | Dinamo Polyvalent Hall, Bucharest; Attendance: 2,000; Referees: Erdoğan, Özdeniz (TUR) |

| 11 September 2025; 18:45 | Industria Kielce (Poland) | 38–27 | (Norway) Kolstad Håndball | Hala Legionów, Kielce; Attendance: 4,123; Referees: Pavićević, Ražnatović (MNE) |
| 11 September 2025; 18:45 | Vlah 7 | (16–12) | four players 4 | Hala Legionów, Kielce; Attendance: 4,123; Referees: Pavićević, Ražnatović (MNE) |
| 11 September 2025; 18:45 | 1× (yellow card) 1× (suspension) | Report | 1× (yellow card) 1× (suspension) | Hala Legionów, Kielce; Attendance: 4,123; Referees: Pavićević, Ražnatović (MNE) |

| 11 September 2025; 20:45 | HBC Nantes (France) | 34–40 | (Germany) Füchse Berlin | Palais des Sports de Beaulieu, Nantes; Attendance: 5,902; Referees: Martins, Martins (POR) |
| 11 September 2025; 20:45 | Rivera Folch 7 | (17–16) | Gidsel 10 | Palais des Sports de Beaulieu, Nantes; Attendance: 5,902; Referees: Martins, Martins (POR) |
| 11 September 2025; 20:45 | 3× (suspension) | Report | 1× (yellow card) 4× (suspension) | Palais des Sports de Beaulieu, Nantes; Attendance: 5,902; Referees: Martins, Martins (POR) |

| 17 September 2025; 18:45 | Kolstad Håndball (Norway) | 31–28 | (Romania) CS Dinamo București | Trondheim Spektrum, Trondheim; Attendance: 3,609; Referees: Sekulić, Jovandić (SRB) |
| 17 September 2025; 18:45 | Guðjónsson 6 | (17–10) | Negru 5 | Trondheim Spektrum, Trondheim; Attendance: 3,609; Referees: Sekulić, Jovandić (SRB) |
| 17 September 2025; 18:45 | 1× (yellow card) 3× (suspension) | Report | 4× (suspension) | Trondheim Spektrum, Trondheim; Attendance: 3,609; Referees: Sekulić, Jovandić (SRB) |

| 18 September 2025; 18:45 | Füchse Berlin (Germany) | 31–28 | (Denmark) Aalborg Håndbold | Max-Schmeling-Halle, Berlin; Attendance: 6,153; Referees: Jørum, Kleven (NOR) |
| 18 September 2025; 18:45 | Gidsel 8 | (17–13) | Arnoldsen, Hald 5 | Max-Schmeling-Halle, Berlin; Attendance: 6,153; Referees: Jørum, Kleven (NOR) |
| 18 September 2025; 18:45 | 2× (suspension) | Report | 1× (yellow card) 6× (suspension) | Max-Schmeling-Halle, Berlin; Attendance: 6,153; Referees: Jørum, Kleven (NOR) |

| 18 September 2025; 18:45 | One Veszprém (Hungary) | 30–25 | (France) HBC Nantes | Veszprém Aréna, Veszprém; Attendance: 4,675; Referees: Álvarez, Bustamante (ESP) |
| 18 September 2025; 18:45 | Descat 8 | (17–15) | Leopold 5 | Veszprém Aréna, Veszprém; Attendance: 4,675; Referees: Álvarez, Bustamante (ESP) |
| 18 September 2025; 18:45 | 1× (yellow card) 1× (suspension) | Report | 3× (suspension) | Veszprém Aréna, Veszprém; Attendance: 4,675; Referees: Álvarez, Bustamante (ESP) |

| 18 September 2025; 20:45 | Sporting CP (Portugal) | 41–37 | (Poland) Industria Kielce | Pavilhão João Rocha, Lisbon; Attendance: 2,443; Referees: Lah, Sok (SLO) |
| 18 September 2025; 20:45 | F. Costa 10 | (20–15) | Sićko 8 | Pavilhão João Rocha, Lisbon; Attendance: 2,443; Referees: Lah, Sok (SLO) |
| 18 September 2025; 20:45 | 1× (yellow card) 8× (suspension) | Report | 1× (yellow card) 4× (suspension) 1× (red card) | Pavilhão João Rocha, Lisbon; Attendance: 2,443; Referees: Lah, Sok (SLO) |

| 24 September 2025; 18:45 | Aalborg Håndbold (Denmark) | 35–30 | (Portugal) Sporting CP | Gigantium, Aalborg; Attendance: 5,315; Referees: Covalciuc, Covalciuc (MDA) |
| 24 September 2025; 18:45 | Juul 9 | (18–12) | Þorkelsson, F. Costa 6 | Gigantium, Aalborg; Attendance: 5,315; Referees: Covalciuc, Covalciuc (MDA) |
| 24 September 2025; 18:45 | 5× (suspension) | Report | 1× (yellow card) 5× (suspension) | Gigantium, Aalborg; Attendance: 5,315; Referees: Covalciuc, Covalciuc (MDA) |

| 24 September 2025; 18:45 | CS Dinamo București (Romania) | 27–30 | (Hungary) One Veszprém | Dinamo Polyvalent Hall, Bucharest; Attendance: 2,200; Referees: Martins, Martins (POR) |
| 24 September 2025; 18:45 | Langaro 7 | (15–15) | Remili 7 | Dinamo Polyvalent Hall, Bucharest; Attendance: 2,200; Referees: Martins, Martins (POR) |
| 24 September 2025; 18:45 | 2× (suspension) | Report | 1× (yellow card) 6× (suspension) | Dinamo Polyvalent Hall, Bucharest; Attendance: 2,200; Referees: Martins, Martins (POR) |

| 24 September 2025; 20:45 | HBC Nantes (France) | 39–24 | (Norway) Kolstad Håndball | Palais des Sports de Beaulieu, Nantes; Attendance: 5,816; Referees: Bolic, Hurich (AUT) |
| 24 September 2025; 20:45 | Minne 7 | (21–13) | Søndenå 4 | Palais des Sports de Beaulieu, Nantes; Attendance: 5,816; Referees: Bolic, Hurich (AUT) |
| 24 September 2025; 20:45 | 1× (yellow card) | Report | 1× (suspension) | Palais des Sports de Beaulieu, Nantes; Attendance: 5,816; Referees: Bolic, Hurich (AUT) |

| 25 September 2025; 18:45 | Industria Kielce (Poland) | 32–37 | (Germany) Füchse Berlin | Hala Legionów, Kielce; Attendance: 4,200; Referees: Nikolov, Nachevski (MKD) |
| 25 September 2025; 18:45 | A. Dujshebaev 9 | (15–22) | Gidsel 13 | Hala Legionów, Kielce; Attendance: 4,200; Referees: Nikolov, Nachevski (MKD) |
| 25 September 2025; 18:45 | 1× (yellow card) 1× (suspension) | Report | 1× (yellow card) 1× (suspension) | Hala Legionów, Kielce; Attendance: 4,200; Referees: Nikolov, Nachevski (MKD) |

| 8 October 2025; 20:45 | Sporting CP (Portugal) | 28–39 | (France) HBC Nantes | Pavilhão João Rocha, Lisbon; Attendance: 2,154; Referees: Mitrevski, Todorovski (MKD) |
| 8 October 2025; 20:45 | M. Costa 10 | (11–23) | Abdi 11 | Pavilhão João Rocha, Lisbon; Attendance: 2,154; Referees: Mitrevski, Todorovski (MKD) |
| 8 October 2025; 20:45 | 1× (yellow card) 4× (suspension) | Report | 1× (yellow card) 7× (suspension) 1× (red card) | Pavilhão João Rocha, Lisbon; Attendance: 2,154; Referees: Mitrevski, Todorovski (MKD) |

| 8 October 2025; 18:45 | Kolstad Håndball (Norway) | 26–35 | (Denmark) Aalborg Håndbold | Trondheim Spektrum, Trondheim; Attendance: 6,094; Referees: Álvarez, Bustamante (ESP) |
| 8 October 2025; 18:45 | Lyse, Aalberg 5 | (12–17) | Arnoldsen 7 | Trondheim Spektrum, Trondheim; Attendance: 6,094; Referees: Álvarez, Bustamante (ESP) |
| 8 October 2025; 18:45 | 1× (suspension) | Report | 1× (yellow card) 5× (suspension) | Trondheim Spektrum, Trondheim; Attendance: 6,094; Referees: Álvarez, Bustamante (ESP) |

| 9 October 2025; 18:45 | One Veszprém (Hungary) | 35–33 | (Poland) Industria Kielce | Veszprém Aréna, Veszprém; Attendance: 4,800; Referees: Konjičanin, Konjičanin (BIH) |
| 9 October 2025; 18:45 | Descat 8 | (21–15) | Jarosiewicz 8 | Veszprém Aréna, Veszprém; Attendance: 4,800; Referees: Konjičanin, Konjičanin (BIH) |
| 9 October 2025; 18:45 | 4× (suspension) | Report | 6× (suspension) | Veszprém Aréna, Veszprém; Attendance: 4,800; Referees: Konjičanin, Konjičanin (BIH) |

| 9 October 2025; 20:45 | Füchse Berlin (Germany) | 32–31 | (Romania) CS Dinamo București | Max-Schmeling-Halle, Berlin; Attendance: 6,517; Referees: Kurtagic, Wetterwik (SWE) |
| 9 October 2025; 20:45 | Gidsel 11 | (16–18) | Akimenko 7 | Max-Schmeling-Halle, Berlin; Attendance: 6,517; Referees: Kurtagic, Wetterwik (SWE) |
| 9 October 2025; 20:45 | 2× (yellow card) 1× (suspension) | Report | 4× (suspension) 1× (red card) | Max-Schmeling-Halle, Berlin; Attendance: 6,517; Referees: Kurtagic, Wetterwik (SWE) |

| 15 October 2025; 18:45 | Aalborg Håndbold (Denmark) | 34–28 | (Romania) CS Dinamo București | Gigantium, Aalborg; Attendance: 5,500; Referees: Bolic, Hurich (AUT) |
| 15 October 2025; 18:45 | Knorr 8 | (18–14) | Valdés 6 | Gigantium, Aalborg; Attendance: 5,500; Referees: Bolic, Hurich (AUT) |
| 15 October 2025; 18:45 | 2× (suspension) | Report | 1× (yellow card) 3× (suspension) | Gigantium, Aalborg; Attendance: 5,500; Referees: Bolic, Hurich (AUT) |

| 15 October 2025; 20:45 | Industria Kielce (Poland) | 27–35 | (France) HBC Nantes | Hala Legionów, Kielce; Attendance: 4,000; Referees: Elíasson, Pálsson (ISL) |
| 15 October 2025; 20:45 | Karalek 7 | (15–15) | Minne 13 | Hala Legionów, Kielce; Attendance: 4,000; Referees: Elíasson, Pálsson (ISL) |
| 15 October 2025; 20:45 | 1× (yellow card) 2× (suspension) | Report | 3× (suspension) | Hala Legionów, Kielce; Attendance: 4,000; Referees: Elíasson, Pálsson (ISL) |

| 16 October 2025; 20:45 | Füchse Berlin (Germany) | 38–27 | (Norway) Kolstad Håndball | Max-Schmeling-Halle, Berlin; Attendance: 6,338; Referees: Barysas, Petrušis (LTU) |
| 16 October 2025; 20:45 | Grøndahl 9 | (19–14) | Jeppsson 7 | Max-Schmeling-Halle, Berlin; Attendance: 6,338; Referees: Barysas, Petrušis (LTU) |
| 16 October 2025; 20:45 | 2× (suspension) | Report | 3× (suspension) | Max-Schmeling-Halle, Berlin; Attendance: 6,338; Referees: Barysas, Petrušis (LTU) |

| 16 October 2025; 20:45 | Sporting CP (Portugal) | 33–32 | (Hungary) One Veszprém | Pavilhão João Rocha, Lisbon; Attendance: 2,074; Referees: Marín, García (ESP) |
| 16 October 2025; 20:45 | Þorkelsson 10 | (18–18) | Hesham 11 | Pavilhão João Rocha, Lisbon; Attendance: 2,074; Referees: Marín, García (ESP) |
| 16 October 2025; 20:45 | 3× (yellow card) 5× (suspension) | Report | 2× (yellow card) 4× (suspension) | Pavilhão João Rocha, Lisbon; Attendance: 2,074; Referees: Marín, García (ESP) |

| 22 October 2025; 18:45 | Kolstad Håndball (Norway) | 30–34 | (Portugal) Sporting CP | Trondheim Spektrum, Trondheim; Attendance: 3,423; Referees: Kurtagic, Wetterwik (SWE) |
| 22 October 2025; 18:45 | Lyse 12 | (19–15) | F. Costa 9 | Trondheim Spektrum, Trondheim; Attendance: 3,423; Referees: Kurtagic, Wetterwik (SWE) |
| 22 October 2025; 18:45 | 1× (yellow card) 2× (suspension) | Report | 1× (yellow card) 1× (suspension) | Trondheim Spektrum, Trondheim; Attendance: 3,423; Referees: Kurtagic, Wetterwik (SWE) |

| 22 October 2025; 20:45 | HBC Nantes (France) | 27–28 | (Denmark) Aalborg Håndbold | Palais des Sports de Beaulieu, Nantes; Attendance: 5,902; Referees: Nikolov, Nachevski (MKD) |
| 22 October 2025; 20:45 | Odriozola 6 | (15–14) | Arnoldsen, Juul 6 | Palais des Sports de Beaulieu, Nantes; Attendance: 5,902; Referees: Nikolov, Nachevski (MKD) |
| 22 October 2025; 20:45 | 1× (yellow card) 4× (suspension) 1× (red card) | Report | 5× (suspension) | Palais des Sports de Beaulieu, Nantes; Attendance: 5,902; Referees: Nikolov, Nachevski (MKD) |

| 23 October 2025; 18:45 | One Veszprém (Hungary) | 31–32 | (Germany) Füchse Berlin | Veszprém Aréna, Veszprém; Attendance: 5,200; Referees: Lah, Sok (SLO) |
| 23 October 2025; 18:45 | Mesilhy 6 | (12–16) | West Av Teigum 7 | Veszprém Aréna, Veszprém; Attendance: 5,200; Referees: Lah, Sok (SLO) |
| 23 October 2025; 18:45 | 2× (yellow card) 1× (suspension) | Report | 2× (yellow card) 4× (suspension) 1× (red card) | Veszprém Aréna, Veszprém; Attendance: 5,200; Referees: Lah, Sok (SLO) |

| 23 October 2025; 18:45 | CS Dinamo București (Romania) | 24–28 | (Poland) Industria Kielce | Dinamo Polyvalent Hall, Bucharest; Attendance: 2,200; Referees: Hansen, Madsen (DEN) |
| 23 October 2025; 18:45 | Pelayo 5 | (12–14) | Karalek 9 | Dinamo Polyvalent Hall, Bucharest; Attendance: 2,200; Referees: Hansen, Madsen (DEN) |
| 23 October 2025; 18:45 | 1× (yellow card) 1× (suspension) | Report | 1× (suspension) | Dinamo Polyvalent Hall, Bucharest; Attendance: 2,200; Referees: Hansen, Madsen (DEN) |

| 12 November 2025; 18:45 | Kolstad Håndball (Norway) | 29–43 | (Hungary) One Veszprém | Kolstad Arena, Trondheim; Attendance: 2,068; Referees: Erdoğan, Özdeniz (TUR) |
| 12 November 2025; 18:45 | Jeppsson 5 | (15–19) | Martinović 7 | Kolstad Arena, Trondheim; Attendance: 2,068; Referees: Erdoğan, Özdeniz (TUR) |
| 12 November 2025; 18:45 | 1× (suspension) | Report | 3× (suspension) | Kolstad Arena, Trondheim; Attendance: 2,068; Referees: Erdoğan, Özdeniz (TUR) |

| 13 November 2025; 18:45 | Industria Kielce (Poland) | 32–32 | (Denmark) Aalborg Håndbold | Hala Legionów, Kielce; Attendance: 4,200; Referees: Marín, García (ESP) |
| 13 November 2025; 18:45 | A. Dujshebaev 7 | (16–15) | Knorr 7 | Hala Legionów, Kielce; Attendance: 4,200; Referees: Marín, García (ESP) |
| 13 November 2025; 18:45 | 2× (yellow card) 1× (suspension) 1× (red card) | Report | 3× (suspension) | Hala Legionów, Kielce; Attendance: 4,200; Referees: Marín, García (ESP) |

| 13 November 2025; 20:45 | Sporting CP (Portugal) | 37–38 | (Germany) Füchse Berlin | Pavilhão João Rocha, Lisbon; Attendance: 2,568; Referees: Horáček, Novotný (CZE) |
| 13 November 2025; 20:45 | F. Costa 12 | (19–20) | Gidsel 13 | Pavilhão João Rocha, Lisbon; Attendance: 2,568; Referees: Horáček, Novotný (CZE) |
| 13 November 2025; 20:45 | 1× (yellow card) 4× (suspension) | Report | 1× (yellow card) 3× (suspension) 1× (red card) | Pavilhão João Rocha, Lisbon; Attendance: 2,568; Referees: Horáček, Novotný (CZE) |

| 13 November 2025; 20:45 | HBC Nantes (France) | 35–28 | (Romania) CS Dinamo București | Palais des Sports de Beaulieu, Nantes; Attendance: 5,902; Referees: Konjičanin, Konjičanin (BIH) |
| 13 November 2025; 20:45 | Leopold 9 | (20–13) | Buzle 5 | Palais des Sports de Beaulieu, Nantes; Attendance: 5,902; Referees: Konjičanin, Konjičanin (BIH) |
| 13 November 2025; 20:45 | 5× (suspension) | Report | 5× (suspension) | Palais des Sports de Beaulieu, Nantes; Attendance: 5,902; Referees: Konjičanin, Konjičanin (BIH) |

| 19 November 2025; 18:45 | Aalborg Håndbold (Denmark) | 34–27 | (Poland) Industria Kielce | Gigantium, Aalborg; Attendance: 5,410; Referees: Bíró, Kiss (HUN) |
| 19 November 2025; 18:45 | Arnoldsen 6 | (16–10) | A. Dujshebaev 7 | Gigantium, Aalborg; Attendance: 5,410; Referees: Bíró, Kiss (HUN) |
| 19 November 2025; 18:45 | 4× (suspension) | Report | 3× (suspension) | Gigantium, Aalborg; Attendance: 5,410; Referees: Bíró, Kiss (HUN) |

| 19 November 2025; 18:45 | One Veszprém (Hungary) | 42–34 | (Norway) Kolstad Håndball | Veszprém Aréna, Veszprém; Attendance: 4,053; Referees: Nikolov, Nachevski (MKD) |
| 19 November 2025; 18:45 | Remili, Mesilhy 7 | (20–18) | Jeppsson 11 | Veszprém Aréna, Veszprém; Attendance: 4,053; Referees: Nikolov, Nachevski (MKD) |
| 19 November 2025; 18:45 | 1× (yellow card) 1× (suspension) | Report | 2× (suspension) | Veszprém Aréna, Veszprém; Attendance: 4,053; Referees: Nikolov, Nachevski (MKD) |

| 20 November 2025; 18:45 | CS Dinamo București (Romania) | 29–28 | (France) HBC Nantes | Dinamo Polyvalent Hall, Bucharest; Attendance: 1,300; Referees: Pavićević, Ražnatović (MNE) |
| 20 November 2025; 18:45 | Dedu, Langaro 6 | (12–15) | Leopold 7 | Dinamo Polyvalent Hall, Bucharest; Attendance: 1,300; Referees: Pavićević, Ražnatović (MNE) |
| 20 November 2025; 18:45 | 1× (yellow card) 1× (suspension) | Report | | Dinamo Polyvalent Hall, Bucharest; Attendance: 1,300; Referees: Pavićević, Ražnatović (MNE) |

| 20 November 2025; 20:45 | Füchse Berlin (Germany) | 33–29 | (Portugal) Sporting CP | Max-Schmeling-Halle, Berlin; Attendance: 5,625; Referees: Álvarez, Bustamante (ESP) |
| 20 November 2025; 20:45 | Andersson 9 | (16–13) | Þorkelsson 8 | Max-Schmeling-Halle, Berlin; Attendance: 5,625; Referees: Álvarez, Bustamante (ESP) |
| 20 November 2025; 20:45 | 1× (yellow card) 4× (suspension) | Report | 1× (yellow card) 1× (suspension) | Max-Schmeling-Halle, Berlin; Attendance: 5,625; Referees: Álvarez, Bustamante (ESP) |

| 26 November 2025; 18:45 | Aalborg Håndbold (Denmark) | 31–24 | (France) HBC Nantes | Gigantium, Aalborg; Attendance: 5,435; Referees: Schulze, Tönnies (GER) |
| 26 November 2025; 18:45 | Juul 6 | (18–13) | Minne 6 | Gigantium, Aalborg; Attendance: 5,435; Referees: Schulze, Tönnies (GER) |
| 26 November 2025; 18:45 | 1× (yellow card) 3× (suspension) | Report | 1× (yellow card) | Gigantium, Aalborg; Attendance: 5,435; Referees: Schulze, Tönnies (GER) |

| 26 November 2025; 18:45 | Industria Kielce (Poland) | 34–32 | (Romania) CS Dinamo București | Hala Legionów, Kielce; Attendance: 4,005; Referees: Mitrevski, Todorovski (MKD) |
| 26 November 2025; 18:45 | three players 5 | (21–19) | Vujović 7 | Hala Legionów, Kielce; Attendance: 4,005; Referees: Mitrevski, Todorovski (MKD) |
| 26 November 2025; 18:45 | 1× (yellow card) 5× (suspension) 1× (red card) | Report | 1× (yellow card) 4× (suspension) | Hala Legionów, Kielce; Attendance: 4,005; Referees: Mitrevski, Todorovski (MKD) |

| 27 November 2025; 20:45 | Füchse Berlin (Germany) | 38–34 | (Hungary) One Veszprém | Max-Schmeling-Halle, Berlin; Attendance: 5,720; Referees: Elíasson, Pálsson (ISL) |
| 27 November 2025; 20:45 | Andersson 10 | (19–14) | Descat 8 | Max-Schmeling-Halle, Berlin; Attendance: 5,720; Referees: Elíasson, Pálsson (ISL) |
| 27 November 2025; 20:45 | 2× (yellow card) 4× (suspension) | Report | 1× (yellow card) 6× (suspension) | Max-Schmeling-Halle, Berlin; Attendance: 5,720; Referees: Elíasson, Pálsson (ISL) |

| 27 November 2025; 20:45 | Sporting CP (Portugal) | 44–31 | (Norway) Kolstad Håndball | Pavilhão João Rocha, Lisbon; Attendance: 1,608; Referees: Kull, Tint (EST) |
| 27 November 2025; 20:45 | Þorkelsson 9 | (22–15) | Jeppsson 7 | Pavilhão João Rocha, Lisbon; Attendance: 1,608; Referees: Kull, Tint (EST) |
| 27 November 2025; 20:45 | 1× (yellow card) 2× (suspension) | Report | 1× (yellow card) 4× (suspension) | Pavilhão João Rocha, Lisbon; Attendance: 1,608; Referees: Kull, Tint (EST) |

| 3 December 2025; 18:45 | CS Dinamo București (Romania) | 27–30 | (Denmark) Aalborg Håndbold | Dinamo Polyvalent Hall, Bucharest; Attendance: 1,500; Referees: Barysas, Petrušis (LTU) |
| 3 December 2025; 18:45 | Dedu, Vujović 5 | (13–16) | Jensen 6 | Dinamo Polyvalent Hall, Bucharest; Attendance: 1,500; Referees: Barysas, Petrušis (LTU) |
| 3 December 2025; 18:45 | 1× (suspension) | Report | 1× (yellow card) 3× (suspension) | Dinamo Polyvalent Hall, Bucharest; Attendance: 1,500; Referees: Barysas, Petrušis (LTU) |

| 4 December 2025; 18:45 | One Veszprém (Hungary) | 32–31 | (Portugal) Sporting CP | Veszprém Aréna, Veszprém; Attendance: 4,650; Referees: Pavićević, Ražnatović (MNE) |
| 4 December 2025; 18:45 | Descat 9 | (19–14) | Þorkelsson 8 | Veszprém Aréna, Veszprém; Attendance: 4,650; Referees: Pavićević, Ražnatović (MNE) |
| 4 December 2025; 18:45 | 1× (yellow card) 6× (suspension) 1× (red card) | Report | 1× (yellow card) 3× (suspension) 1× (red card) | Veszprém Aréna, Veszprém; Attendance: 4,650; Referees: Pavićević, Ražnatović (MNE) |

| 4 December 2025; 18:45 | Kolstad Håndball (Norway) | 28–24 | (Germany) Füchse Berlin | Trondheim Spektrum, Trondheim; Attendance: 4,102; Referees: Bíró, Kiss (HUN) |
| 4 December 2025; 18:45 | Søndenå 9 | (15–12) | Langhoff 7 | Trondheim Spektrum, Trondheim; Attendance: 4,102; Referees: Bíró, Kiss (HUN) |
| 4 December 2025; 18:45 | 2× (suspension) | Report | 2× (suspension) | Trondheim Spektrum, Trondheim; Attendance: 4,102; Referees: Bíró, Kiss (HUN) |

| 4 December 2025; 20:45 | HBC Nantes (France) | 29–33 | (Poland) Industria Kielce | Palais des Sports de Beaulieu, Nantes; Attendance: 10,604; Referees: Horáček, Novotný (CZE) |
| 4 December 2025; 20:45 | Leopold 8 | (16–17) | A. Dujshebaev 7 | Palais des Sports de Beaulieu, Nantes; Attendance: 10,604; Referees: Horáček, Novotný (CZE) |
| 4 December 2025; 20:45 | 2× (suspension) | Report | 2× (suspension) | Palais des Sports de Beaulieu, Nantes; Attendance: 10,604; Referees: Horáček, Novotný (CZE) |

| 18 February 2026; 18:45 | Aalborg Håndbold (Denmark) | 36–24 | (Norway) Kolstad Håndball | Gigantium, Aalborg; Attendance: 5,427; Referees: Pétursson, Þrastarson (ISL) |
| 18 February 2026; 18:45 | Arnoldsen 8 | (17–14) | Jeppsson 7 | Gigantium, Aalborg; Attendance: 5,427; Referees: Pétursson, Þrastarson (ISL) |
| 18 February 2026; 18:45 | 3× (suspension) | Report | 1× (yellow card) 1× (suspension) | Gigantium, Aalborg; Attendance: 5,427; Referees: Pétursson, Þrastarson (ISL) |

| 19 February 2026; 18:45 | Industria Kielce (Poland) | 36–35 | (Hungary) One Veszprém | Hala Legionów, Kielce; Attendance: 4,200; Referees: Covalciuc, Covalciuc (MDA) |
| 19 February 2026; 18:45 | A. Dujshebaev, Jarosiewicz 6 | (17–9) | Martinović 7 | Hala Legionów, Kielce; Attendance: 4,200; Referees: Covalciuc, Covalciuc (MDA) |
| 19 February 2026; 18:45 | 1× (yellow card) 1× (suspension) | Report | 4× (suspension) | Hala Legionów, Kielce; Attendance: 4,200; Referees: Covalciuc, Covalciuc (MDA) |

| 19 February 2026; 18:45 | CS Dinamo București (Romania) | 21–27 | (Germany) Füchse Berlin | Dinamo Polyvalent Hall, Bucharest; Attendance: 2,875; Referees: Gasmi, Gasmi (FRA) |
| 19 February 2026; 18:45 | Vujović 5 | (12–13) | Gidsel 8 | Dinamo Polyvalent Hall, Bucharest; Attendance: 2,875; Referees: Gasmi, Gasmi (FRA) |
| 19 February 2026; 18:45 | 1× (yellow card) 1× (suspension) | Report | 2× (yellow card) 3× (suspension) | Dinamo Polyvalent Hall, Bucharest; Attendance: 2,875; Referees: Gasmi, Gasmi (FRA) |

| 19 February 2026; 20:45 | HBC Nantes (France) | 38–27 | (Portugal) Sporting CP | Palais des Sports de Beaulieu, Nantes; Attendance: 5,902; Referees: Bíró, Kiss (HUN) |
| 19 February 2026; 20:45 | Tournat 9 | (21–16) | M. Costa 8 | Palais des Sports de Beaulieu, Nantes; Attendance: 5,902; Referees: Bíró, Kiss (HUN) |
| 19 February 2026; 20:45 | 1× (suspension) | Report | 1× (yellow card) 1× (suspension) | Palais des Sports de Beaulieu, Nantes; Attendance: 5,902; Referees: Bíró, Kiss (HUN) |

| 25 February 2026; 18:45 | One Veszprém (Hungary) | 35–28 | (Romania) CS Dinamo București | Veszprém Aréna, Veszprém; Attendance: 4,800; Referees: Mikelić, Parađina (CRO) |
| 25 February 2026; 18:45 | Descat 9 | (18–12) | Vujović 5 | Veszprém Aréna, Veszprém; Attendance: 4,800; Referees: Mikelić, Parađina (CRO) |
| 25 February 2026; 18:45 | 1× (suspension) | Report | | Veszprém Aréna, Veszprém; Attendance: 4,800; Referees: Mikelić, Parađina (CRO) |

| 25 February 2026; 20:45 | Kolstad Håndball (Norway) | 26–33 | (France) HBC Nantes | Trondheim Spektrum, Trondheim; Attendance: 1,825; Referees: Budzák, Záhradník (SVK) |
| 25 February 2026; 20:45 | Jeppsson 8 | (12–15) | Leopold 7 | Trondheim Spektrum, Trondheim; Attendance: 1,825; Referees: Budzák, Záhradník (SVK) |
| 25 February 2026; 20:45 | 1× (suspension) | Report | 1× (yellow card) 2× (suspension) | Trondheim Spektrum, Trondheim; Attendance: 1,825; Referees: Budzák, Záhradník (SVK) |

| 26 February 2026; 18:45 | Füchse Berlin (Germany) | 31–33 | (Poland) Industria Kielce | Max-Schmeling-Halle, Berlin; Attendance: 8,611; Referees: Boričić, Marković (SRB) |
| 26 February 2026; 18:45 | Gidsel 10 | (13–15) | Sićko 6 | Max-Schmeling-Halle, Berlin; Attendance: 8,611; Referees: Boričić, Marković (SRB) |
| 26 February 2026; 18:45 | 2× (yellow card) 4× (suspension) | Report | 2× (yellow card) 5× (suspension) | Max-Schmeling-Halle, Berlin; Attendance: 8,611; Referees: Boričić, Marković (SRB) |

| 26 February 2026; 20:45 | Sporting CP (Portugal) | 35–33 | (Denmark) Aalborg Håndbold | Pavilhão João Rocha, Lisbon; Attendance: 2,447; Referees: Sekulić, Jovandić (SRB) |
| 26 February 2026; 20:45 | F. Costa 10 | (14–19) | Arnoldsen 10 | Pavilhão João Rocha, Lisbon; Attendance: 2,447; Referees: Sekulić, Jovandić (SRB) |
| 26 February 2026; 20:45 | 3× (yellow card) 4× (suspension) | Report | 3× (suspension) | Pavilhão João Rocha, Lisbon; Attendance: 2,447; Referees: Sekulić, Jovandić (SRB) |

| 4 March 2026; 18:45 | Aalborg Håndbold (Denmark) | 31–35 | (Germany) Füchse Berlin | Gigantium, Aalborg; Attendance: 5,500; Referees: Pavićević, Ražnatović (MNE) |
| 4 March 2026; 18:45 | Hangaard 8 | (15–16) | Gidsel 8 | Gigantium, Aalborg; Attendance: 5,500; Referees: Pavićević, Ražnatović (MNE) |
| 4 March 2026; 18:45 | 1× (yellow card) 3× (suspension) | Report | 1× (yellow card) 1× (suspension) | Gigantium, Aalborg; Attendance: 5,500; Referees: Pavićević, Ražnatović (MNE) |

| 4 March 2026; 20:45 | Industria Kielce (Poland) | 39–33 | (Portugal) Sporting CP | Hala Legionów, Kielce; Attendance: 4,100; Referees: Erdoğan, Özdeniz (TUR) |
| 4 March 2026; 20:45 | Sićko 9 | (20–16) | M. Costa 10 | Hala Legionów, Kielce; Attendance: 4,100; Referees: Erdoğan, Özdeniz (TUR) |
| 4 March 2026; 20:45 | 1× (yellow card) 3× (suspension) | Report | 1× (yellow card) 5× (suspension) 1× (red card) | Hala Legionów, Kielce; Attendance: 4,100; Referees: Erdoğan, Özdeniz (TUR) |

| 5 March 2026; 18:45 | CS Dinamo București (Romania) | 33–23 | (Norway) Kolstad Håndball | Dinamo Polyvalent Hall, Bucharest; Attendance: 1,000; Referees: Weijmans, Wolbertus (NED) |
| 5 March 2026; 18:45 | Langaro 6 | (12–11) | Jeppsson 8 | Dinamo Polyvalent Hall, Bucharest; Attendance: 1,000; Referees: Weijmans, Wolbertus (NED) |
| 5 March 2026; 18:45 | 4× (suspension) | Report | 1× (yellow card) 2× (suspension) | Dinamo Polyvalent Hall, Bucharest; Attendance: 1,000; Referees: Weijmans, Wolbertus (NED) |

| 5 March 2026; 20:45 | HBC Nantes (France) | 33–31 | (Hungary) One Veszprém | Palais des Sports de Beaulieu, Nantes; Attendance: 5,902; Referees: Marín, García (ESP) |
| 5 March 2026; 20:45 | Odriozola 7 | (15–18) | Hesham 7 | Palais des Sports de Beaulieu, Nantes; Attendance: 5,902; Referees: Marín, García (ESP) |
| 5 March 2026; 20:45 | 2× (suspension) | Report | 2× (yellow card) 2× (suspension) | Palais des Sports de Beaulieu, Nantes; Attendance: 5,902; Referees: Marín, García (ESP) |

| 12 March 2026; 18:45 | One Veszprém (Hungary) | 33–38 | (Denmark) Aalborg Håndbold | Veszprém Aréna, Veszprém; Attendance: 4,900; Referees: Boričić, Marković (SRB) |
| 12 March 2026; 18:45 | Cindrić 7 | (16–20) | Arnoldsen 8 | Veszprém Aréna, Veszprém; Attendance: 4,900; Referees: Boričić, Marković (SRB) |
| 12 March 2026; 18:45 | 1× (yellow card) | Report | 1× (yellow card) 3× (suspension) | Veszprém Aréna, Veszprém; Attendance: 4,900; Referees: Boričić, Marković (SRB) |

| 12 March 2026; 18:45 | Kolstad Håndball (Norway) | 26–27 | (Poland) Industria Kielce | Trondheim Spektrum, Trondheim; Attendance: 2,067; Referees: Mitrevski, Todorovski (MKD) |
| 12 March 2026; 18:45 | Jeppsson 8 | (14–13) | Karalek, Sićko 7 | Trondheim Spektrum, Trondheim; Attendance: 2,067; Referees: Mitrevski, Todorovski (MKD) |
| 12 March 2026; 18:45 | 3× (suspension) | Report | 4× (suspension) | Trondheim Spektrum, Trondheim; Attendance: 2,067; Referees: Mitrevski, Todorovski (MKD) |

| 12 March 2026; 20:45 | Füchse Berlin (Germany) | 34–37 | (France) HBC Nantes | Max-Schmeling-Halle, Berlin; Attendance: 6,306; Referees: Lah, Sok (SLO) |
| 12 March 2026; 20:45 | Gidsel 11 | (14–15) | Briet 13 | Max-Schmeling-Halle, Berlin; Attendance: 6,306; Referees: Lah, Sok (SLO) |
| 12 March 2026; 20:45 | 2× (yellow card) 2× (suspension) | Report | 1× (yellow card) 4× (suspension) | Max-Schmeling-Halle, Berlin; Attendance: 6,306; Referees: Lah, Sok (SLO) |

| 12 March 2026; 20:45 | Sporting CP (Portugal) | 30–29 | (Romania) CS Dinamo București | Pavilhão Multiusos de Odivelas, Odivelas; Attendance: 837; Referees: Budzák, Záhradník (SVK) |
| 12 March 2026; 20:45 | F. Costa, M. Costa 7 | (14–13) | Vujović 5 | Pavilhão Multiusos de Odivelas, Odivelas; Attendance: 837; Referees: Budzák, Záhradník (SVK) |
| 12 March 2026; 20:45 | 1× (yellow card) 2× (suspension) | Report | 1× (yellow card) 3× (suspension) | Pavilhão Multiusos de Odivelas, Odivelas; Attendance: 837; Referees: Budzák, Záhradník (SVK) |

=== Group B ===
| Pos | Team | Pld | W | D | L | GF | GA | GD | Pts | Qualification |
|---|---|---|---|---|---|---|---|---|---|---|
| 1 | (Spain) Barça | 14 | 13 | 0 | 1 | 492 | 382 | +110 | 26 | Quarterfinals |
| 2 | (Germany) SC Magdeburg | 14 | 11 | 1 | 2 | 457 | 408 | +49 | 23 | Quarterfinals |
| 3 | (Poland) Orlen Wisła Płock | 14 | 8 | 2 | 4 | 424 | 410 | +14 | 18 | Playoffs |
| 4 | (France) Paris Saint-Germain | 14 | 6 | 1 | 7 | 446 | 436 | +10 | 13 (Note: Paris Saint-Germain 65–64 GOG Håndbold) | Playoffs |
| 5 | (Denmark) GOG Håndbold | 14 | 6 | 1 | 7 | 443 | 468 | −25 | 13 | Playoffs |
| 6 | (Hungary) OTP Bank – Pick Szeged | 14 | 5 | 1 | 8 | 428 | 424 | +4 | 11 | Playoffs |
| 7 | (North Macedonia) RK Eurofarm Pelister | 14 | 2 | 2 | 10 | 369 | 447 | −78 | 6 | |
| 8 | (Croatia) RK Zagreb | 14 | 1 | 0 | 13 | 375 | 459 | −84 | 2 | |

Source: EHF
Rules for classification: Tiebreakers
Notes:

| 10 September 2025; 20:45 | SC Magdeburg (Germany) | 37–31 | (France) Paris Saint-Germain | GETEC Arena, Magdeburg; Attendance: 6,182; Referees: Marín, García (ESP) |
| 10 September 2025; 20:45 | Claar 10 | (21–17) | Syprzak 11 | GETEC Arena, Magdeburg; Attendance: 6,182; Referees: Marín, García (ESP) |
| 10 September 2025; 20:45 | 2× (yellow card) 6× (suspension) | Report | 1× (yellow card) 6× (suspension) | GETEC Arena, Magdeburg; Attendance: 6,182; Referees: Marín, García (ESP) |

| 10 September 2025; 20:45 | RK Eurofarm Pelister (North Macedonia) | 25–23 | (Croatia) RK Zagreb | Boro Čurlevski Sports Hall, Bitola; Attendance: 3,000; Referees: Schulze, Tönnies (GER) |
| 10 September 2025; 20:45 | Manaskov 8 | (13–12) | Glavaš 7 | Boro Čurlevski Sports Hall, Bitola; Attendance: 3,000; Referees: Schulze, Tönnies (GER) |
| 10 September 2025; 20:45 | 4× (suspension) | Report | 5× (suspension) | Boro Čurlevski Sports Hall, Bitola; Attendance: 3,000; Referees: Schulze, Tönnies (GER) |

| 11 September 2025; 18:45 | OTP Bank – Pick Szeged (Hungary) | 33–34 | (Poland) Orlen Wisła Płock | Pick Aréna, Szeged; Attendance: 4,739; Referees: Nikolov, Nachevski (MKD) |
| 11 September 2025; 18:45 | Šoštarić 9 | (16–16) | Richardson 12 | Pick Aréna, Szeged; Attendance: 4,739; Referees: Nikolov, Nachevski (MKD) |
| 11 September 2025; 18:45 | 5× (suspension) | Report | 1× (yellow card) 3× (suspension) | Pick Aréna, Szeged; Attendance: 4,739; Referees: Nikolov, Nachevski (MKD) |

| 11 September 2025; 20:45 | Barça (Spain) | 37–32 | (Denmark) GOG Håndbold | Palau Blaugrana, Barcelona; Attendance: 1,820; Referees: Bíró, Kiss (HUN) |
| 11 September 2025; 20:45 | Daniel Fernández 6 | (25–14) | Mittún 5 | Palau Blaugrana, Barcelona; Attendance: 1,820; Referees: Bíró, Kiss (HUN) |
| 11 September 2025; 20:45 | 1× (suspension) | Report | 4× (suspension) | Palau Blaugrana, Barcelona; Attendance: 1,820; Referees: Bíró, Kiss (HUN) |

| 17 September 2025; 18:45 | GOG Håndbold (Denmark) | 31–36 | (Hungary) OTP Bank – Pick Szeged | Arena Fyn, Odense; Attendance: 1,900; Referees: Horáček, Novotný (CZE) |
| 17 September 2025; 18:45 | N. Pedersen 8 | (16–18) | Šoštarić 12 | Arena Fyn, Odense; Attendance: 1,900; Referees: Horáček, Novotný (CZE) |
| 17 September 2025; 18:45 | 1× (yellow card) 3× (suspension) | Report | 3× (suspension) | Arena Fyn, Odense; Attendance: 1,900; Referees: Horáček, Novotný (CZE) |

| 17 September 2025; 20:45 | Orlen Wisła Płock (Poland) | 30–27 | (Croatia) RK Zagreb | Orlen Arena, Płock; Attendance: 3,716; Referees: Kurtagic, Wetterwik (SWE) |
| 17 September 2025; 20:45 | Janc 6 | (17–13) | Bialiauski 7 | Orlen Arena, Płock; Attendance: 3,716; Referees: Kurtagic, Wetterwik (SWE) |
| 17 September 2025; 20:45 | 3× (suspension) 1× (red card) | Report | 5× (suspension) | Orlen Arena, Płock; Attendance: 3,716; Referees: Kurtagic, Wetterwik (SWE) |

| 18 September 2025; 20:45 | Barça (Spain) | 21–22 | (Germany) SC Magdeburg | Palau Blaugrana, Barcelona; Attendance: 1,832; Referees: Konjičanin, Konjičanin (BIH) |
| 18 September 2025; 20:45 | Gómez 7 | (12–15) | Magnússon 6 | Palau Blaugrana, Barcelona; Attendance: 1,832; Referees: Konjičanin, Konjičanin (BIH) |
| 18 September 2025; 20:45 | 4× (suspension) | Report | 1× (yellow card) 2× (suspension) | Palau Blaugrana, Barcelona; Attendance: 1,832; Referees: Konjičanin, Konjičanin (BIH) |

| 18 September 2025; 20:45 | Paris Saint-Germain (France) | 33–27 | (North Macedonia) RK Eurofarm Pelister | Stade Pierre de Coubertin, Paris; Attendance: 2,499; Referees: Elíasson, Pálsson (ISL) |
| 18 September 2025; 20:45 | Prandi 11 | (16–16) | Manaskov 5 | Stade Pierre de Coubertin, Paris; Attendance: 2,499; Referees: Elíasson, Pálsson (ISL) |
| 18 September 2025; 20:45 | 1× (yellow card) 2× (suspension) | Report | 2× (yellow card) 4× (suspension) | Stade Pierre de Coubertin, Paris; Attendance: 2,499; Referees: Elíasson, Pálsson (ISL) |

| 24 September 2025; 20:45 | RK Eurofarm Pelister (North Macedonia) | 28–31 | (Denmark) GOG Håndbold | Boro Čurlevski Sports Hall, Bitola; Attendance: 3,000; Referees: Marín, García (ESP) |
| 24 September 2025; 20:45 | Manaskov 9 | (14–14) | Bjerre 13 | Boro Čurlevski Sports Hall, Bitola; Attendance: 3,000; Referees: Marín, García (ESP) |
| 24 September 2025; 20:45 | 1× (yellow card) 4× (suspension) | Report | 2× (yellow card) 2× (suspension) | Boro Čurlevski Sports Hall, Bitola; Attendance: 3,000; Referees: Marín, García (ESP) |

| 25 September 2025; 18:45 | OTP Bank – Pick Szeged (Hungary) | 31–29 | (France) Paris Saint-Germain | Pick Aréna, Szeged; Attendance: 6,575; Referees: Erdoğan, Özdeniz (TUR) |
| 25 September 2025; 18:45 | Smárason 7 | (17–17) | Karlsson 7 | Pick Aréna, Szeged; Attendance: 6,575; Referees: Erdoğan, Özdeniz (TUR) |
| 25 September 2025; 18:45 | 1× (yellow card) 2× (suspension) | Report | 1× (yellow card) | Pick Aréna, Szeged; Attendance: 6,575; Referees: Erdoğan, Özdeniz (TUR) |

| 25 September 2025; 18:45 | RK Zagreb (Croatia) | 25–32 | (Spain) Barça | Arena Zagreb, Zagreb; Attendance: 8,750; Referees: Pavićević, Ražnatović (MNE) |
| 25 September 2025; 18:45 | Klarica 6 | (12–17) | three players 6 | Arena Zagreb, Zagreb; Attendance: 8,750; Referees: Pavićević, Ražnatović (MNE) |
| 25 September 2025; 18:45 | 3× (suspension) | Report | 3× (suspension) | Arena Zagreb, Zagreb; Attendance: 8,750; Referees: Pavićević, Ražnatović (MNE) |

| 25 September 2025; 20:45 | SC Magdeburg (Germany) | 27–26 | (Poland) Orlen Wisła Płock | GETEC Arena, Magdeburg; Attendance: 5,932; Referees: Boričić, Marković (SRB) |
| 25 September 2025; 20:45 | Magnússon 9 | (14–10) | Kosorotov 8 | GETEC Arena, Magdeburg; Attendance: 5,932; Referees: Boričić, Marković (SRB) |
| 25 September 2025; 20:45 | 2× (yellow card) 2× (suspension) | Report | 6× (suspension) | GETEC Arena, Magdeburg; Attendance: 5,932; Referees: Boričić, Marković (SRB) |

| 8 October 2025; 18:45 | Orlen Wisła Płock (Poland) | 36–25 | (North Macedonia) RK Eurofarm Pelister | Orlen Arena, Płock; Attendance: 3,900; Referees: Hansen, Madsen (DEN) |
| 8 October 2025; 18:45 | Richardson 8 | (18–14) | Manaskov 7 | Orlen Arena, Płock; Attendance: 3,900; Referees: Hansen, Madsen (DEN) |
| 8 October 2025; 18:45 | 1× (yellow card) 1× (suspension) | Report | 4× (suspension) 1× (red card) | Orlen Arena, Płock; Attendance: 3,900; Referees: Hansen, Madsen (DEN) |

| 8 October 2025; 18:45 | GOG Håndbold (Denmark) | 30–39 | (Germany) SC Magdeburg | Arena Fyn, Odense; Attendance: 3,043; Referees: Budzák, Záhradník (SVK) |
| 8 October 2025; 18:45 | Bjerre 9 | (16–18) | Magnússon 11 | Arena Fyn, Odense; Attendance: 3,043; Referees: Budzák, Záhradník (SVK) |
| 8 October 2025; 18:45 | 1× (yellow card) 1× (suspension) | Report | 1× (yellow card) 1× (suspension) | Arena Fyn, Odense; Attendance: 3,043; Referees: Budzák, Záhradník (SVK) |

| 9 October 2025; 20:45 | Barça (Spain) | 31–28 | (Hungary) OTP Bank – Pick Szeged | Palau Blaugrana, Barcelona; Attendance: 1,784; Referees: Gasmi, Gasmi (FRA) |
| 9 October 2025; 20:45 | Barrufet 6 | (14–13) | Šoštarić 8 | Palau Blaugrana, Barcelona; Attendance: 1,784; Referees: Gasmi, Gasmi (FRA) |
| 9 October 2025; 20:45 | 1× (suspension) | Report | 2× (suspension) | Palau Blaugrana, Barcelona; Attendance: 1,784; Referees: Gasmi, Gasmi (FRA) |

| 9 October 2025; 20:45 | Paris Saint-Germain (France) | 35–32 | (Croatia) RK Zagreb | Stade Pierre de Coubertin, Paris; Attendance: 2,596; Referees: Bíró, Kiss (HUN) |
| 9 October 2025; 20:45 | Solé 10 | (18–17) | Klarica 9 | Stade Pierre de Coubertin, Paris; Attendance: 2,596; Referees: Bíró, Kiss (HUN) |
| 9 October 2025; 20:45 | 4× (suspension) | Report | 3× (suspension) | Stade Pierre de Coubertin, Paris; Attendance: 2,596; Referees: Bíró, Kiss (HUN) |

| 15 October 2025; 18:45 | Orlen Wisła Płock (Poland) | 35–32 | (France) Paris Saint-Germain | Orlen Arena, Płock; Attendance: 5,412; Referees: Jørum, Kleven (NOR) |
| 15 October 2025; 18:45 | Richardson 10 | (13–16) | Prandi 12 | Orlen Arena, Płock; Attendance: 5,412; Referees: Jørum, Kleven (NOR) |
| 15 October 2025; 18:45 | 2× (suspension) | Report | 3× (suspension) | Orlen Arena, Płock; Attendance: 5,412; Referees: Jørum, Kleven (NOR) |

| 15 October 2025; 18:45 | OTP Bank – Pick Szeged (Hungary) | 30–34 | (Germany) SC Magdeburg | Pick Aréna, Szeged; Attendance: 6,186; Referees: Covalciuc, Covalciuc (MDA) |
| 15 October 2025; 18:45 | Šoštarić 8 | (15–18) | Bergendahl 7 | Pick Aréna, Szeged; Attendance: 6,186; Referees: Covalciuc, Covalciuc (MDA) |
| 15 October 2025; 18:45 | 4× (suspension) | Report | 2× (suspension) | Pick Aréna, Szeged; Attendance: 6,186; Referees: Covalciuc, Covalciuc (MDA) |

| 15 October 2025; 20:45 | RK Eurofarm Pelister (North Macedonia) | 30–34 | (Spain) Barça | Boro Čurlevski Sports Hall, Bitola; Attendance: 3,000; Referees: Erdoğan, Özdeniz (TUR) |
| 15 October 2025; 20:45 | Manaskov, Henigman 8 | (13–17) | Makuc, Mem 6 | Boro Čurlevski Sports Hall, Bitola; Attendance: 3,000; Referees: Erdoğan, Özdeniz (TUR) |
| 15 October 2025; 20:45 | 2× (suspension) | Report | 1× (yellow card) 1× (suspension) | Boro Čurlevski Sports Hall, Bitola; Attendance: 3,000; Referees: Erdoğan, Özdeniz (TUR) |

| 16 October 2025; 18:45 | RK Zagreb (Croatia) | 31–36 | (Denmark) GOG Håndbold | Arena Zagreb, Zagreb; Attendance: 4,475; Referees: Martins, Martins (POR) |
| 16 October 2025; 18:45 | Klarica, Tskhovrebadze 6 | (11–19) | Bjerre, Vilhelmsen 8 | Arena Zagreb, Zagreb; Attendance: 4,475; Referees: Martins, Martins (POR) |
| 16 October 2025; 18:45 | 2× (yellow card) 1× (suspension) 1× (red card) | Report | 4× (suspension) | Arena Zagreb, Zagreb; Attendance: 4,475; Referees: Martins, Martins (POR) |

| 22 October 2025; 18:45 | RK Zagreb (Croatia) | 23–28 | (Hungary) OTP Bank – Pick Szeged | Arena Zagreb, Zagreb; Attendance: 4,233; Referees: Álvarez, Bustamante (ESP) |
| 22 October 2025; 18:45 | Glavaš 6 | (10–10) | Garciandia, Jelinić 5 | Arena Zagreb, Zagreb; Attendance: 4,233; Referees: Álvarez, Bustamante (ESP) |
| 22 October 2025; 18:45 | 2× (yellow card) 2× (suspension) | Report | 1× (yellow card) 1× (suspension) 1× (red card) | Arena Zagreb, Zagreb; Attendance: 4,233; Referees: Álvarez, Bustamante (ESP) |

| 23 October 2025; 20:45 | Orlen Wisła Płock (Poland) | 24–34 | (Spain) Barça | Orlen Arena, Płock; Attendance: 5,450; Referees: Mitrevski, Todorovski (MKD) |
| 23 October 2025; 20:45 | Zarabec 7 | (9–16) | Gómez 8 | Orlen Arena, Płock; Attendance: 5,450; Referees: Mitrevski, Todorovski (MKD) |
| 23 October 2025; 20:45 | 1× (yellow card) 4× (suspension) | Report | 3× (yellow card) 5× (suspension) | Orlen Arena, Płock; Attendance: 5,450; Referees: Mitrevski, Todorovski (MKD) |

| 23 October 2025; 20:45 | Paris Saint-Germain (France) | 34–36 | (Denmark) GOG Håndbold | Stade Pierre de Coubertin, Paris; Attendance: 3,106; Referees: Pavićević, Ražnatović (MNE) |
| 23 October 2025; 20:45 | Prandi 9 | (13–20) | Bjerre, Mittún 9 | Stade Pierre de Coubertin, Paris; Attendance: 3,106; Referees: Pavićević, Ražnatović (MNE) |
| 23 October 2025; 20:45 | 2× (yellow card) 2× (suspension) | Report | 1× (yellow card) 3× (suspension) | Stade Pierre de Coubertin, Paris; Attendance: 3,106; Referees: Pavićević, Ražnatović (MNE) |

| 23 October 2025; 20:45 | SC Magdeburg (Germany) | 36–26 | (North Macedonia) RK Eurofarm Pelister | GETEC Arena, Magdeburg; Attendance: 6,267; Referees: Bíró, Kiss (HUN) |
| 23 October 2025; 20:45 | Magnússon 10 | (19–13) | Kuzmanovski 6 | GETEC Arena, Magdeburg; Attendance: 6,267; Referees: Bíró, Kiss (HUN) |
| 23 October 2025; 20:45 | 2× (suspension) | Report | 3× (suspension) | GETEC Arena, Magdeburg; Attendance: 6,267; Referees: Bíró, Kiss (HUN) |

| 12 November 2025; 18:45 | GOG Håndbold (Denmark) | 28–31 | (France) Paris Saint-Germain | Arena Svendborg, Svendborg; Attendance: 3,556; Referees: Schulze, Tönnies (GER) |
| 12 November 2025; 18:45 | Bjerre 9 | (18–17) | Prandi 8 | Arena Svendborg, Svendborg; Attendance: 3,556; Referees: Schulze, Tönnies (GER) |
| 12 November 2025; 18:45 | 2× (suspension) | Report | 2× (yellow card) 3× (suspension) | Arena Svendborg, Svendborg; Attendance: 3,556; Referees: Schulze, Tönnies (GER) |

| 12 November 2025; 20:45 | SC Magdeburg (Germany) | 27–22 | (Croatia) RK Zagreb | GETEC Arena, Magdeburg; Attendance: 6,098; Referees: Barysas, Petrušis (LTU) |
| 12 November 2025; 20:45 | Barthold 6 | (10–9) | Glavaš 7 | GETEC Arena, Magdeburg; Attendance: 6,098; Referees: Barysas, Petrušis (LTU) |
| 12 November 2025; 20:45 | 1× (suspension) 1× (red card) | Report | 1× (yellow card) 4× (suspension) | GETEC Arena, Magdeburg; Attendance: 6,098; Referees: Barysas, Petrušis (LTU) |

| 12 November 2025; 20:45 | RK Eurofarm Pelister (North Macedonia) | 25–24 | (Hungary) OTP Bank – Pick Szeged | Boro Čurlevski Sports Hall, Bitola; Attendance: 3,000; Referees: Jørum, Kleven (NOR) |
| 12 November 2025; 20:45 | Peshevski 7 | (11–8) | Garciandia 6 | Boro Čurlevski Sports Hall, Bitola; Attendance: 3,000; Referees: Jørum, Kleven (NOR) |
| 12 November 2025; 20:45 | 2× (yellow card) 4× (suspension) | Report | 1× (yellow card) 4× (suspension) | Boro Čurlevski Sports Hall, Bitola; Attendance: 3,000; Referees: Jørum, Kleven (NOR) |

| 13 November 2025; 20:45 | Barça (Spain) | 30–24 | (Poland) Orlen Wisła Płock | Palau Blaugrana, Barcelona; Attendance: 1,936; Referees: Elíasson, Pálsson (ISL) |
| 13 November 2025; 20:45 | Gómez 9 | (12–12) | Richardson 5 | Palau Blaugrana, Barcelona; Attendance: 1,936; Referees: Elíasson, Pálsson (ISL) |
| 13 November 2025; 20:45 | 1× (yellow card) 2× (suspension) | Report | 1× (yellow card) 6× (suspension) | Palau Blaugrana, Barcelona; Attendance: 1,936; Referees: Elíasson, Pálsson (ISL) |

| 19 November 2025; 18:45 | RK Zagreb (Croatia) | 35–43 | (Germany) SC Magdeburg | Arena Zagreb, Zagreb; Attendance: 4,600; Referees: Horáček, Novotný (CZE) |
| 19 November 2025; 18:45 | Bialiauski 8 | (14–22) | Musche 11 | Arena Zagreb, Zagreb; Attendance: 4,600; Referees: Horáček, Novotný (CZE) |
| 19 November 2025; 18:45 | 3× (suspension) | Report | 2× (suspension) | Arena Zagreb, Zagreb; Attendance: 4,600; Referees: Horáček, Novotný (CZE) |

| 19 November 2025; 20:45 | Paris Saint-Germain (France) | 27–30 | (Spain) Barça | Stade Pierre de Coubertin, Paris; Attendance: 3,150; Referees: Kurtagic, Wetterwik (SWE) |
| 19 November 2025; 20:45 | Omar 7 | (13–19) | N'Guessan, Fabregas 7 | Stade Pierre de Coubertin, Paris; Attendance: 3,150; Referees: Kurtagic, Wetterwik (SWE) |
| 19 November 2025; 20:45 | 1× (yellow card) 2× (suspension) | Report | 2× (suspension) | Stade Pierre de Coubertin, Paris; Attendance: 3,150; Referees: Kurtagic, Wetterwik (SWE) |

| 20 November 2025; 18:45 | GOG Håndbold (Denmark) | 28–30 | (Poland) Orlen Wisła Płock | Arena Svendborg, Svendborg; Attendance: 2,612; Referees: Lah, Sok (SLO) |
| 20 November 2025; 18:45 | Vilhelmsen 8 | (13–17) | Dawydzik, Fazekas 6 | Arena Svendborg, Svendborg; Attendance: 2,612; Referees: Lah, Sok (SLO) |
| 20 November 2025; 18:45 | 1× (yellow card) 5× (suspension) | Report | 3× (suspension) 1× (red card) | Arena Svendborg, Svendborg; Attendance: 2,612; Referees: Lah, Sok (SLO) |

| 20 November 2025; 18:45 | OTP Bank – Pick Szeged (Hungary) | 35–20 | (North Macedonia) RK Eurofarm Pelister | Pick Aréna, Szeged; Attendance: 3,992; Referees: Martins, Martins (POR) |
| 20 November 2025; 18:45 | Frimmel, Kukić 7 | (14–9) | three players 3 | Pick Aréna, Szeged; Attendance: 3,992; Referees: Martins, Martins (POR) |
| 20 November 2025; 18:45 | 2× (suspension) | Report | 4× (suspension) | Pick Aréna, Szeged; Attendance: 3,992; Referees: Martins, Martins (POR) |

| 26 November 2025; 20:45 | RK Eurofarm Pelister (North Macedonia) | 26–31 | (Germany) SC Magdeburg | Boro Čurlevski Sports Hall, Bitola; Attendance: 3,000; Referees: Mandak, Rudinsky (SVK) |
| 26 November 2025; 20:45 | Manaskov, Radivojević 5 | (12–15) | Saugstrup 6 | Boro Čurlevski Sports Hall, Bitola; Attendance: 3,000; Referees: Mandak, Rudinsky (SVK) |
| 26 November 2025; 20:45 | 1× (yellow card) 7× (suspension) 1× (red card) | Report | 1× (yellow card) 4× (suspension) | Boro Čurlevski Sports Hall, Bitola; Attendance: 3,000; Referees: Mandak, Rudinsky (SVK) |

| 27 November 2025; 18:45 | GOG Håndbold (Denmark) | 28–41 | (Spain) Barça | Arena Fyn, Odense; Attendance: 3,600; Referees: Bolic, Hurich (AUT) |
| 27 November 2025; 18:45 | Bjerre, Lykke 5 | (14–21) | Gómez, N'Guessan 7 | Arena Fyn, Odense; Attendance: 3,600; Referees: Bolic, Hurich (AUT) |
| 27 November 2025; 18:45 | | Report | 1× (yellow card) 2× (suspension) | Arena Fyn, Odense; Attendance: 3,600; Referees: Bolic, Hurich (AUT) |

| 27 November 2025; 18:45 | OTP Bank – Pick Szeged (Hungary) | 32–26 | (Croatia) RK Zagreb | Pick Aréna, Szeged; Attendance: 4,600; Referees: Boričić, Marković (SRB) |
| 27 November 2025; 18:45 | Šoštarić 9 | (16–16) | Bialiauski 7 | Pick Aréna, Szeged; Attendance: 4,600; Referees: Boričić, Marković (SRB) |
| 27 November 2025; 18:45 | 3× (suspension) | Report | 2× (yellow card) 7× (suspension) 1× (red card) | Pick Aréna, Szeged; Attendance: 4,600; Referees: Boričić, Marković (SRB) |

| 27 November 2025; 20:45 | Paris Saint-Germain (France) | 29–30 | (Poland) Orlen Wisła Płock | Stade Pierre de Coubertin, Paris; Attendance: 2,370; Referees: Horváth, Marton (HUN) |
| 27 November 2025; 20:45 | Prandi 9 | (14–18) | Daszek 7 | Stade Pierre de Coubertin, Paris; Attendance: 2,370; Referees: Horváth, Marton (HUN) |
| 27 November 2025; 20:45 | 5× (suspension) | Report | 3× (suspension) | Stade Pierre de Coubertin, Paris; Attendance: 2,370; Referees: Horváth, Marton (HUN) |

| 3 December 2025; 18:45 | RK Zagreb (Croatia) | 27–23 | (North Macedonia) RK Eurofarm Pelister | Arena Zagreb, Zagreb; Attendance: 4,085; Referees: Lah, Sok (SLO) |
| 3 December 2025; 18:45 | Glavaš 10 | (14–12) | Kuzmanovski 7 | Arena Zagreb, Zagreb; Attendance: 4,085; Referees: Lah, Sok (SLO) |
| 3 December 2025; 18:45 | 1× (yellow card) 4× (suspension) | Report | 2× (yellow card) 2× (suspension) | Arena Zagreb, Zagreb; Attendance: 4,085; Referees: Lah, Sok (SLO) |

| 3 December 2025; 20:45 | Barça (Spain) | 38–33 | (France) Paris Saint-Germain | Palau Blaugrana, Barcelona; Attendance: 3,408; Referees: Martins, Martins (POR) |
| 3 December 2025; 20:45 | Gómez 10 | (26–16) | Prandi 14 | Palau Blaugrana, Barcelona; Attendance: 3,408; Referees: Martins, Martins (POR) |
| 3 December 2025; 20:45 | 1× (yellow card) 1× (suspension) | Report | 3× (suspension) | Palau Blaugrana, Barcelona; Attendance: 3,408; Referees: Martins, Martins (POR) |

| 4 December 2025; 18:45 | Orlen Wisła Płock (Poland) | 34–35 | (Denmark) GOG Håndbold | Orlen Arena, Płock; Attendance: 3,975; Referees: Erdoğan, Özdeniz (TUR) |
| 4 December 2025; 18:45 | Richardson 9 | (14–16) | Bjerre 9 | Orlen Arena, Płock; Attendance: 3,975; Referees: Erdoğan, Özdeniz (TUR) |
| 4 December 2025; 18:45 | 2× (suspension) | Report | 2× (yellow card) 2× (suspension) | Orlen Arena, Płock; Attendance: 3,975; Referees: Erdoğan, Özdeniz (TUR) |

| 4 December 2025; 20:45 | SC Magdeburg (Germany) | 40–32 | (Hungary) OTP Bank – Pick Szeged | GETEC Arena, Magdeburg; Attendance: 5,886; Referees: Nikolov, Nachevski (MKD) |
| 4 December 2025; 20:45 | Kristjánsson 6 | (19–13) | Bodó, Kukić 5 | GETEC Arena, Magdeburg; Attendance: 5,886; Referees: Nikolov, Nachevski (MKD) |
| 4 December 2025; 20:45 | 2× (suspension) | Report | 1× (yellow card) 2× (suspension) | GETEC Arena, Magdeburg; Attendance: 5,886; Referees: Nikolov, Nachevski (MKD) |

| 18 February 2026; 18:45 | OTP Bank – Pick Szeged (Hungary) | 27–35 | (Spain) Barça | Pick Aréna, Szeged; Attendance: 7,922; Referees: Mitrevski, Todorovski (MKD) |
| 18 February 2026; 18:45 | Garciandia 5 | (10–18) | Gómez 9 | Pick Aréna, Szeged; Attendance: 7,922; Referees: Mitrevski, Todorovski (MKD) |
| 18 February 2026; 18:45 | 1× (yellow card) 2× (suspension) | Report | 1× (suspension) | Pick Aréna, Szeged; Attendance: 7,922; Referees: Mitrevski, Todorovski (MKD) |

| 18 February 2026; 18:45 | RK Zagreb (Croatia) | 24–35 | (France) Paris Saint-Germain | Arena Zagreb, Zagreb; Attendance: 7,485; Referees: Erdoğan, Özdeniz (TUR) |
| 18 February 2026; 18:45 | Tskhovrebadze 5 | (10–21) | Omar, Syprzak 7 | Arena Zagreb, Zagreb; Attendance: 7,485; Referees: Erdoğan, Özdeniz (TUR) |
| 18 February 2026; 18:45 | 1× (suspension) | Report | 1× (suspension) | Arena Zagreb, Zagreb; Attendance: 7,485; Referees: Erdoğan, Özdeniz (TUR) |

| 18 February 2026; 20:45 | SC Magdeburg (Germany) | 37–30 | (Denmark) GOG Håndbold | GETEC Arena, Magdeburg; Attendance: 6,240; Referees: Weijmans, Wolbertus (NED) |
| 18 February 2026; 20:45 | Magnússon 6 | (17–15) | Dalby 6 | GETEC Arena, Magdeburg; Attendance: 6,240; Referees: Weijmans, Wolbertus (NED) |
| 18 February 2026; 20:45 | 1× (yellow card) | Report | 1× (yellow card) 1× (suspension) | GETEC Arena, Magdeburg; Attendance: 6,240; Referees: Weijmans, Wolbertus (NED) |

| 19 February 2026; 20:45 | RK Eurofarm Pelister (North Macedonia) | 25–28 | (Poland) Orlen Wisła Płock | Boro Čurlevski Sports Hall, Bitola; Attendance: 3,000; Referees: Barysas, Petrušis (LTU) |
| 19 February 2026; 20:45 | three players 4 | (9–13) | Janc 7 | Boro Čurlevski Sports Hall, Bitola; Attendance: 3,000; Referees: Barysas, Petrušis (LTU) |
| 19 February 2026; 20:45 | 4× (suspension) | Report | 6× (suspension) | Boro Čurlevski Sports Hall, Bitola; Attendance: 3,000; Referees: Barysas, Petrušis (LTU) |

| 25 February 2026; 18:45 | GOG Håndbold (Denmark) | 28–28 | (North Macedonia) RK Eurofarm Pelister | Arena Svendborg, Svendborg; Attendance: 2,849; Referees: Konjičanin, Konjičanin (BIH) |
| 25 February 2026; 18:45 | Mittún 7 | (15–11) | Widomski 7 | Arena Svendborg, Svendborg; Attendance: 2,849; Referees: Konjičanin, Konjičanin (BIH) |
| 25 February 2026; 18:45 | 1× (yellow card) 3× (suspension) | Report | 5× (suspension) 1× (red card) | Arena Svendborg, Svendborg; Attendance: 2,849; Referees: Konjičanin, Konjičanin (BIH) |

| 26 February 2026; 20:45 | Orlen Wisła Płock (Poland) | 29–29 | (Germany) SC Magdeburg | Orlen Arena, Płock; Attendance: 4,447; Referees: Martins, Martins (POR) |
| 26 February 2026; 20:45 | Kosorotov 7 | (14–12) | Musche 5 | Orlen Arena, Płock; Attendance: 4,447; Referees: Martins, Martins (POR) |
| 26 February 2026; 20:45 | | Report | 1× (yellow card) 1× (suspension) | Orlen Arena, Płock; Attendance: 4,447; Referees: Martins, Martins (POR) |

| 26 February 2026; 20:45 | Barça (Spain) | 46–26 | (Croatia) RK Zagreb | Palau Blaugrana, Barcelona; Attendance: 2,755; Referees: Kull, Tint (EST) |
| 26 February 2026; 20:45 | Gómez, Cikuša 7 | (25–13) | Tskhovrebadze, Glavaš 5 | Palau Blaugrana, Barcelona; Attendance: 2,755; Referees: Kull, Tint (EST) |
| 26 February 2026; 20:45 | | Report | 5× (suspension) | Palau Blaugrana, Barcelona; Attendance: 2,755; Referees: Kull, Tint (EST) |

| 26 February 2026; 20:45 | Paris Saint-Germain (France) | 29–28 | (Hungary) OTP Bank – Pick Szeged | Stade Pierre de Coubertin, Paris; Attendance: 3,005; Referees: Lah, Sok (SLO) |
| 26 February 2026; 20:45 | Prandi 8 | (14–15) | Frimmel 8 | Stade Pierre de Coubertin, Paris; Attendance: 3,005; Referees: Lah, Sok (SLO) |
| 26 February 2026; 20:45 | 1× (suspension) | Report | 4× (suspension) | Stade Pierre de Coubertin, Paris; Attendance: 3,005; Referees: Lah, Sok (SLO) |

| 4 March 2026; 18:45 | RK Zagreb (Croatia) | 26–34 | (Poland) Orlen Wisła Płock | Arena Zagreb, Zagreb; Attendance: 2,175; Referees: Jørum, Kleven (NOR) |
| 4 March 2026; 18:45 | Tskhovrebadze 6 | (11–17) | Richardson 8 | Arena Zagreb, Zagreb; Attendance: 2,175; Referees: Jørum, Kleven (NOR) |
| 4 March 2026; 18:45 | 2× (yellow card) 5× (suspension) | Report | 2× (suspension) | Arena Zagreb, Zagreb; Attendance: 2,175; Referees: Jørum, Kleven (NOR) |

| 4 March 2026; 20:45 | RK Eurofarm Pelister (North Macedonia) | 34–34 | (France) Paris Saint-Germain | Boro Čurlevski Sports Hall, Bitola; Attendance: 3,000; Referees: Bolic, Hurich (AUT) |
| 4 March 2026; 20:45 | Kuzmanovski 19 | (15–18) | Omar 10 | Boro Čurlevski Sports Hall, Bitola; Attendance: 3,000; Referees: Bolic, Hurich (AUT) |
| 4 March 2026; 20:45 | 3× (suspension) | Report | 4× (suspension) | Boro Čurlevski Sports Hall, Bitola; Attendance: 3,000; Referees: Bolic, Hurich (AUT) |

| 5 March 2026; 18:45 | OTP Bank – Pick Szeged (Hungary) | 34–37 | (Denmark) GOG Håndbold | Pick Aréna, Szeged; Attendance: 4,531; Referees: Elíasson, Pálsson (ISL) |
| 5 March 2026; 18:45 | Smárason 7 | (16–15) | Bjerre 12 | Pick Aréna, Szeged; Attendance: 4,531; Referees: Elíasson, Pálsson (ISL) |
| 5 March 2026; 18:45 | 1× (yellow card) | Report | 2× (yellow card) 3× (suspension) | Pick Aréna, Szeged; Attendance: 4,531; Referees: Elíasson, Pálsson (ISL) |

| 5 March 2026; 20:45 | SC Magdeburg (Germany) | 29–36 | (Spain) Barça | GETEC Arena, Magdeburg; Attendance: 6,490; Referees: Hansen, Madsen (DEN) |
| 5 March 2026; 20:45 | Claar 7 | (16–16) | Gómez 7 | GETEC Arena, Magdeburg; Attendance: 6,490; Referees: Hansen, Madsen (DEN) |
| 5 March 2026; 20:45 | 1× (suspension) | Report | 2× (suspension) | GETEC Arena, Magdeburg; Attendance: 6,490; Referees: Hansen, Madsen (DEN) |

| 11 March 2026; 18:45 | Orlen Wisła Płock (Poland) | 30–30 | (Hungary) OTP Bank – Pick Szeged | Orlen Arena, Płock; Attendance: 3,562; Referees: Konjičanin, Konjičanin (BIH) |
| 11 March 2026; 18:45 | Richardson 8 | (14–15) | Toto 7 | Orlen Arena, Płock; Attendance: 3,562; Referees: Konjičanin, Konjičanin (BIH) |
| 11 March 2026; 18:45 | 3× (suspension) | Report | 1× (yellow card) 4× (suspension) | Orlen Arena, Płock; Attendance: 3,562; Referees: Konjičanin, Konjičanin (BIH) |

| 11 March 2026; 18:45 | GOG Håndbold (Denmark) | 33–28 | (Croatia) RK Zagreb | Arena Svendborg, Svendborg; Attendance: 2,650; Referees: Álvarez, Bustamante (ESP) |
| 11 March 2026; 18:45 | Bjerre 9 | (16–13) | Tskhovrebadze 6 | Arena Svendborg, Svendborg; Attendance: 2,650; Referees: Álvarez, Bustamante (ESP) |
| 11 March 2026; 18:45 | 1× (suspension) | Report | 2× (yellow card) 5× (suspension) | Arena Svendborg, Svendborg; Attendance: 2,650; Referees: Álvarez, Bustamante (ESP) |

| 11 March 2026; 20:45 | Barça (Spain) | 47–27 | (North Macedonia) RK Eurofarm Pelister | Palau Blaugrana, Barcelona; Attendance: 1,647; Referees: Pétursson, Þrastarson (ISL) |
| 11 March 2026; 20:45 | Basterra 7 | (24–15) | seven players 3 | Palau Blaugrana, Barcelona; Attendance: 1,647; Referees: Pétursson, Þrastarson (ISL) |
| 11 March 2026; 20:45 | 1× (suspension) | Report | 3× (suspension) | Palau Blaugrana, Barcelona; Attendance: 1,647; Referees: Pétursson, Þrastarson (ISL) |

| 11 March 2026; 20:45 | Paris Saint-Germain (France) | 34–26 | (Germany) SC Magdeburg | Stade Pierre de Coubertin, Paris; Attendance: 2,371; Referees: Covalciuc, Covalciuc (MDA) |
| 11 March 2026; 20:45 | Prandi 11 | (15–11) | Zehnder 7 | Stade Pierre de Coubertin, Paris; Attendance: 2,371; Referees: Covalciuc, Covalciuc (MDA) |
| 11 March 2026; 20:45 | 2× (suspension) | Report | 1× (suspension) | Stade Pierre de Coubertin, Paris; Attendance: 2,371; Referees: Covalciuc, Covalciuc (MDA) |
