= 2025–26 EHF Champions League =

European handball tournament

EHF Champions League
- 2025–26

Tournament information
- Sport: Handball
- Dates: 10 September 2025–14 June 2026
- Teams: 16
- Website: ehfcl.com

Final positions
- Champions: (Spain) Barça
- Runner-up: (Germany) Füchse Berlin

Tournament statistics
- Matches played: 132
- Goals scored: 8282 (62.74 per match)
- Attendance: 664,515 (5,034 per match)
- MVP: Domen Makuc
- Top scorer(s): Mathias Gidsel (161 goals)

The 2025–26 EHF Champions League was the 66th edition of Europe's premier club handball tournament, running from 10 September 2025 to 14 June 2026.

SC Magdeburg were the defending champions. Barça won their 12th title with a win Füchse Berlin.

== Format ==
The tournament ran using the same format as the previous three seasons. The competition began with a group stage featuring sixteen teams divided into two groups. Matches were played in a double round-robin system with home-and-away fixtures, fourteen in total for each team. In Groups A and B, the top two teams automatically qualified for the quarter-finals, with teams ranked third to sixth entered the playoff round.

The knockout stage included four rounds: the playoffs, quarter-finals, and a final-four tournament comprising two semifinals and the final. In the playoffs, eight teams were paired against each other in two-legged home-and-away matches (third-placed in group A played sixth-placed group B; fourth-placed group A played fifth-placed group B, etc.). The four aggregate winners of the playoffs advanced to the quarterfinals, joining the top-two teams of Groups A and B. The eight quarterfinalist teams were paired against each other in two-legged home-and-away matches, with the four aggregate winners qualifying to the final-four tournament.

In the final four tournament, the semifinals and the final were played as single matches at a pre-selected host venue.

== Association ranking ==
Ten of the sixteen teams competing in the group stage were determined through the EHF association ranking for the 2024–25 season, based on the results of the three previous seasons. The remaining six places will be awarded as wildcards.

- Associations ranked 1–9 have their league champion qualified for the group stage and could have apply their league runner-up for a wildcard.
- The best-ranked association in the EHF European League could have its league champion and runner-up qualify for the group stage, but could not apply for a wildcard.
- Associations ranked outside the top nine could have only had their league champion apply for a wildcard.

Rank	Association	Average points	Teams
1	Spain	215.00	1
2	Germany	182.33	2
3	Poland	166.33	2
4	Denmark	139.33	2
5	Hungary	127.00	2
6	France	127.00	2
7	Romania	56.50	1
8	Croatia	49.00	1

Rank	Association	Average points	Teams
9	Portugal	47.00	1
10	Norway	46.33	1
11	North Macedonia	34.67	1
12	Ukraine	34.00	0
13	Belarus	30.00	0
14	Slovenia	29.00	0
15	All other associations	0.00	0

== Participating teams ==
The first ten teams were revealed on 18 June 2025. The full list was announced on 24 June 2025.

(Croatia) RK Zagreb (1st)	(Denmark) Aalborg Håndbold (1st)	(Spain) Barcelona (1st)	(France) Paris Saint-Germain (1st)
(Germany) Füchse Berlin (1st)	(Germany) SC Magdeburg (2nd)	(Hungary) One Veszprém (1st)	(Poland) Orlen Wisła Płock (1st)
(Portugal) Sporting CP (1st)	(Romania) CS Dinamo București (1st)	(Denmark) GOG Håndbold (2nd) ^{WC}	(France) HBC Nantes (2nd) ^{WC}
(Hungary) OTP Bank – Pick Szeged (2nd) ^{WC}	(North Macedonia) RK Eurofarm Pelister (1st) ^{WC}	(Norway) Kolstad Håndball (2nd) ^{WC}	(Poland) Industria Kielce (2nd) ^{WC}

- ^{WC} Accepted wildcards

Rejected wildcards

(Portugal) FC Porto (2nd)	(Slovenia) RD LL Grosist Slovan (1st)	(Switzerland) Kadetten Schaffhausen (1st)

== Group stage ==
Location of teams of the 2025–26 EHF Champions League group stage.
Red: Group A; Blue: Group B.

The 16 teams were drawn into two groups of eight. Teams from the same national association could not be drawn into the same group. The draw took place on 27 June 2025.

In the group stage, teams were ranked according to points (2 points for a win, 1 point for a draw, 0 points for a loss). After completion of the group stage, if two or more teams have scored the same number of points, the ranking will be determined as follows:

1. Highest number of points in matches between the teams directly involved;
2. Superior goal difference in matches between the teams directly involved;
3. Highest number of goals scored in matches between the teams directly involved;
4. Superior goal difference in all matches of the group;
5. Highest number of plus goals in all matches of the group;
6. Drawing of Lots

A total of 11 national associations were represented in the group stage. GOG Håndbold came back after a year absence.

=== Group A ===
Pos	Team	Pld	W	D	L	GF	GA	GD	Pts	Qualification	BER	AAL	KIE	NAN	VES	SPO	BUC	KOL
1	(Germany) Füchse Berlin	14	11	0	3	470	433	+37	22	Quarterfinals	—	31–28	31–33	34–37	38–34	33–29	32–31	38–27
2	(Denmark) Aalborg Håndbold	14	10	1	3	457	407	+50	21	Quarterfinals	31–35	—	34–27	31–24	32–28	35–30	34–28	36–24
3	(Poland) Industria Kielce	14	8	1	5	456	451	+5	17	Playoffs	32–37	32–32	—	27–35	36–35	39–33	34–32	38–27
4	(France) HBC Nantes	14	8	0	6	456	416	+40	16	Playoffs	34–40	27–28	29–33	—	33–31	38–27	35–28	39–24
5	(Hungary) One Veszprém	14	7	0	7	471	449	+22	14 (Note: One Veszprém 64–64 Sporting CP. Veszprém ranked fifth because of the better overall goal difference.)	Playoffs	31–32	33–38	35–33	30–25	—	32–31	35–28	42–34
6	(Portugal) Sporting CP	14	7	0	7	465	476	−11	14	Playoffs	37–38	35–33	41–37	28–39	33–32	—	30–29	44–31
7	(Romania) CS Dinamo București	14	2	0	12	395	430	−35	4		21–27	27–30	24–28	29–28	27–30	30–33	—	33–23
8	(Norway) Kolstad Håndball	14	2	0	12	386	494	−108	4		28–24	26–35	26–27	26–33	29–43	30–34	31–28	—

Source: EHF
Rules for classification: Tiebreakers

=== Group B ===
Pos	Team	Pld	W	D	L	GF	GA	GD	Pts	Qualification	BAR	MAG	PLO	PAR	GOG	SZE	PEL	ZAG
1	(Spain) Barça	14	13	0	1	492	382	+110	26	Quarterfinals	—	21–22	30–24	38–33	37–32	31–28	47–27	46–26
2	(Germany) SC Magdeburg	14	11	1	2	457	408	+49	23	Quarterfinals	29–36	—	27–26	37–31	37–30	40–32	36–26	27–22
3	(Poland) Orlen Wisła Płock	14	8	2	4	424	410	+14	18	Playoffs	24–34	29–29	—	35–32	34–35	30–30	36–25	30–27
4	(France) Paris Saint-Germain	14	6	1	7	446	436	+10	13 (Note: Paris Saint-Germain 65–64 GOG Håndbold)	Playoffs	27–30	34–26	29–30	—	34–36	29–28	33–27	35–32
5	(Denmark) GOG Håndbold	14	6	1	7	443	468	−25	13	Playoffs	28–41	30–39	28–30	28–31	—	31–36	28–28	33–28
6	(Hungary) OTP Bank – Pick Szeged	14	5	1	8	428	424	+4	11	Playoffs	27–35	30–34	33–34	31–29	34–37	—	35–20	32–26
7	(North Macedonia) RK Eurofarm Pelister	14	2	2	10	369	447	−78	6		30–34	26–31	25–28	34–34	28–31	25–24	—	25–23
8	(Croatia) RK Zagreb	14	1	0	13	375	459	−84	2		25–32	35–43	26–34	24–35	31–36	23–28	27–23	—

Source: EHF
Rules for classification: Tiebreakers

== Knockout stage ==
=== Playoffs ===
Team 1	Agg.	Team 2	1st leg	2nd leg
OTP Bank – Pick Szeged (Hungary)	58–55	(Poland) Industria Kielce	26–23	32–32
Sporting CP (Portugal)	60–57	(Poland) Orlen Wisła Płock	33–29	27–28
GOG Håndbold (Denmark)	61–74	(France) HBC Nantes	33–34	28–40
One Veszprém (Hungary)	67–59	(France) Paris Saint-Germain	32–24	35–35

=== Quarterfinals ===
Team 1	Agg.	Team 2	1st leg	2nd leg
One Veszprém (Hungary)	65–65 (3–4 p)	(Germany) Füchse Berlin	35–34	30–31
HBC Nantes (France)	51–63	(Spain) Barça	30–32	21–31
Sporting CP (Portugal)	67–68	(Denmark) Aalborg Håndbold	31–31	36–37
OTP Bank – Pick Szeged (Hungary)	65–80	(Germany) SC Magdeburg	28–35	37–45

=== Final four ===
The final four was held at the Lanxess Arena in Cologne, Germany on 13 and 14 June 2026.

==== Bracket ====
Semi-finals
13 June
(Denmark) Aalborg Håndbold	32
(Spain) Barça (ET)	37
13 June
(Germany) SC Magdeburg	35
(Germany) Füchse Berlin	40

Final
14 June
(Spain) Barça	37
(Germany) Füchse Berlin	34
Third place
14 June
(Denmark) Aalborg Håndbold	26
(Germany) SC Magdeburg	32

==== Final ====
14 June 2026; 18:00	Barça (Spain)	37–34	(Germany) Füchse Berlin	Lanxess Arena, Cologne; Attendance: 20,122; Referees: Jørum, Kleven (NOR)
14 June 2026; 18:00	Frade 7	(20–16)	Gidsel 8	Lanxess Arena, Cologne; Attendance: 20,122; Referees: Jørum, Kleven (NOR)
14 June 2026; 18:00	1× (yellow card) 2× (suspension) 1× (red card)	Report	2× (yellow card) 2× (suspension) 1× (red card)	Lanxess Arena, Cologne; Attendance: 20,122; Referees: Jørum, Kleven (NOR)

== Top goalscorers ==
Rank	Player	Club	Goals
1	(Denmark) Mathias Gidsel	(Germany) Füchse Berlin	161
2	(Portugal) Francisco Costa	(Portugal) Sporting CP	136
3	(France) Elohim Prandi	(France) Paris Saint-Germain	120
4	(Spain) Aleix Gómez	(Spain) Barcelona	117
5	(Denmark) Frederik Bjerre	(Denmark) GOG Håndbold	115
6	(Portugal) Martim Costa	(Portugal) Sporting CP	112
7	(France) Melvyn Richardson	(Poland) Orlen Wisła Płock	103
8	(Denmark) Thomas Arnoldsen	(Denmark) Aalborg Håndbold	99
8	(Iceland) Ómar Ingi Magnússon	(Germany) SC Magdeburg	99
10	(Denmark) Lasse Andersson	(Germany) Füchse Berlin	97

== Awards ==
The All-star team of the Champions League 2025/26

Position	Player
Goalkeeper	(Denmark) Emil Nielsen (Barça)
Right wing	(Spain) Aleix Gómez (Barça)
Right back	(Denmark) Mathias Gidsel (Füchse Berlin)
Centre back	(Slovenia) Domen Makuc (Barça)
Left back	(Denmark) Lasse Andersson (Füchse Berlin)
Left wing	(Germany) Tim Freihöfer (Füchse Berlin)
Pivot	(Denmark) Magnus Saugstrup (SC Magdeburg)
Best defender	(France) Ludovic Fabregas (Barça)

== See also ==
- 2025–26 EHF European League
- 2025–26 EHF European Cup
- 2025–26 Women's EHF Champions League
- 2025–26 Women's EHF European League
- 2025–26 Women's EHF European Cup
