= 2025–26 EHF Champions League knockout stage =

Handball tournament

The 2025–26 EHF Champions League knockout stage began on 1 April with the playoffs and ended on 14 June 2026 with the final at the Lanxess Arena in Cologne, Germany, to decide the winners of the 2025–26 EHF Champions League. A total of twelve teams competed in the knockout phase.

== Format ==
In the playoffs, the eight teams ranked third to sixth in Groups A and B played against each other in two-legged home-and-away matches. The four winning teams advanced to the quarterfinals, where they were joined by the top-two teams of Groups A and B for another round of two-legged home-and-away matches. The four quarterfinal winners qualified for the final four tournament at the Lanxess Arena in Cologne, Germany.

== Qualified teams ==
The top six teams from Groups A and B qualified for the knockout stage.

Group	Qualified for quarterfinals		Qualified for playoffs			
Group	First place	Second place	Third place	Fourth place	Fifth place	Sixth place
A	(Germany) Füchse Berlin	(Denmark) Aalborg Håndbold	(Poland) Industria Kielce	(France) HBC Nantes	(Hungary) One Veszprém	(Portugal) Sporting CP
B	(Spain) Barça	(Germany) SC Magdeburg	(Poland) Orlen Wisła Płock	(France) Paris Saint-Germain	(Denmark) GOG Håndbold	(Hungary) OTP Bank – Pick Szeged

== Playoffs ==
=== Overview ===
Team 1	Agg.	Team 2	1st leg	2nd leg
OTP Bank – Pick Szeged (Hungary)	58–55	(Poland) Industria Kielce	26–23	32–32
Sporting CP (Portugal)	60–57	(Poland) Orlen Wisła Płock	33–29	27–28
GOG Håndbold (Denmark)	61–74	(France) HBC Nantes	33–34	28–40
One Veszprém (Hungary)	67–59	(France) Paris Saint-Germain	32–24	35–35

==== Matches ====
2 April 2026; 18:45	OTP Bank – Pick Szeged (Hungary)	26–23	(Poland) Industria Kielce	Pick Aréna, Szeged; Attendance: 4,970; Referees: Gasmi, Gasmi (FRA)
2 April 2026; 18:45	Kukić 6	(11–11)	Jaroszewicz 6	Pick Aréna, Szeged; Attendance: 4,970; Referees: Gasmi, Gasmi (FRA)
2 April 2026; 18:45	4× (suspension)	Report	3× (suspension)	Pick Aréna, Szeged; Attendance: 4,970; Referees: Gasmi, Gasmi (FRA)

8 April 2026; 18:45	Industria Kielce (Poland)	32–32	(Hungary) OTP Bank – Pick Szeged	Hala Legionów, Kielce; Attendance: 4,200; Referees: Hansen, Madsen (DEN)
8 April 2026; 18:45	Sićko 8	(17–19)	Kukić 6	Hala Legionów, Kielce; Attendance: 4,200; Referees: Hansen, Madsen (DEN)
8 April 2026; 18:45	3× (suspension)	Report	5× (suspension)	Hala Legionów, Kielce; Attendance: 4,200; Referees: Hansen, Madsen (DEN)

OTP Bank – Pick Szeged won 58–55 on aggregate.

2 April 2026; 20:45	Sporting CP (Portugal)	33–29	(Poland) Orlen Wisła Płock	Pavilhão João Rocha, Lisbon; Attendance: 2,552; Referees: Schulze, Tönnies (GER)
2 April 2026; 20:45	F. Costa 10	(19–12)	Krajewski, Richardson 5	Pavilhão João Rocha, Lisbon; Attendance: 2,552; Referees: Schulze, Tönnies (GER)
2 April 2026; 20:45	6× (suspension)	Report	1× (yellow card) 4× (suspension)	Pavilhão João Rocha, Lisbon; Attendance: 2,552; Referees: Schulze, Tönnies (GER)

9 April 2026; 18:45	Orlen Wisła Płock (Poland)	28–27	(Portugal) Sporting CP	Orlen Arena, Płock; Attendance: 5,467; Referees: Pavićević, Ražnatović (MNE)
9 April 2026; 18:45	Kosorotov 7	(13–11)	F. Costa 8	Orlen Arena, Płock; Attendance: 5,467; Referees: Pavićević, Ražnatović (MNE)
9 April 2026; 18:45	4× (suspension)	Report	3× (suspension) 1× (red card)	Orlen Arena, Płock; Attendance: 5,467; Referees: Pavićević, Ražnatović (MNE)

Sporting CP won 60–57 on aggregate.

1 April 2026; 20:45	GOG Håndbold (Denmark)	33–34	(France) HBC Nantes	Arena Svendborg, Svendborg; Attendance: 2,590; Referees: Erdoğan, Özdeniz (TUR)
1 April 2026; 20:45	Bjerre 11	(19–16)	Bos, Tournat 7	Arena Svendborg, Svendborg; Attendance: 2,590; Referees: Erdoğan, Özdeniz (TUR)
1 April 2026; 20:45	1× (yellow card) 2× (suspension)	Report	3× (suspension)	Arena Svendborg, Svendborg; Attendance: 2,590; Referees: Erdoğan, Özdeniz (TUR)

8 April 2026; 20:45	HBC Nantes (France)	40–28	(Denmark) GOG Håndbold	Palais des Sports de Beaulieu, Nantes; Attendance: 5,902; Referees: Bolic, Hurich (AUT)
8 April 2026; 20:45	Rivera 9	(21–12)	Vilhelmsen 6	Palais des Sports de Beaulieu, Nantes; Attendance: 5,902; Referees: Bolic, Hurich (AUT)
8 April 2026; 20:45	1× (suspension)	Report	2× (suspension)	Palais des Sports de Beaulieu, Nantes; Attendance: 5,902; Referees: Bolic, Hurich (AUT)

HBC Nantes won 74–61 on aggregate.

1 April 2026; 18:45	One Veszprém (Hungary)	32–24	(France) Paris Saint-Germain	Veszprém Aréna, Veszprém; Attendance: 5,019; Referees: Mitrevski, Todorovski (MKD)
1 April 2026; 18:45	Descat 10	(15–9)	Syprzak 8	Veszprém Aréna, Veszprém; Attendance: 5,019; Referees: Mitrevski, Todorovski (MKD)
1 April 2026; 18:45	2× (yellow card) 4× (suspension) 1× (red card)	Report	1× (yellow card) 2× (suspension)	Veszprém Aréna, Veszprém; Attendance: 5,019; Referees: Mitrevski, Todorovski (MKD)

9 April 2026; 20:45	Paris Saint-Germain (France)	35–35	(Hungary) One Veszprém	Stade Pierre de Coubertin, Paris; Attendance: 2,915; Referees: Sekulić, Jovandić (SRB)
9 April 2026; 20:45	Syprzak 10	(20–18)	Hesham, El-Deraa 6	Stade Pierre de Coubertin, Paris; Attendance: 2,915; Referees: Sekulić, Jovandić (SRB)
9 April 2026; 20:45	3× (suspension)	Report	2× (suspension)	Stade Pierre de Coubertin, Paris; Attendance: 2,915; Referees: Sekulić, Jovandić (SRB)

One Veszprém won 67–59 on aggregate.

== Quarterfinals ==
=== Overview ===
Team 1	Agg.	Team 2	1st leg	2nd leg
One Veszprém (Hungary)	65–65 (3–4 p)	(Germany) Füchse Berlin	35–34	30–31
HBC Nantes (France)	51–63	(Spain) Barça	30–32	21–31
Sporting CP (Portugal)	67–68	(Denmark) Aalborg Håndbold	31–31	36–37
OTP Bank – Pick Szeged (Hungary)	65–80	(Germany) SC Magdeburg	28–35	37–45

==== Matches ====
30 April 2026; 18:45	One Veszprém (Hungary)	35–34	(Germany) Füchse Berlin	Veszprém Aréna, Veszprém; Attendance: 5,250; Referees: Álvarez, Bustamante (ESP)
30 April 2026; 18:45	Martinović, Descat 8	(17–20)	Gidsel 13	Veszprém Aréna, Veszprém; Attendance: 5,250; Referees: Álvarez, Bustamante (ESP)
30 April 2026; 18:45	1× (yellow card) 1× (suspension)	Report	1× (yellow card) 1× (suspension)	Veszprém Aréna, Veszprém; Attendance: 5,250; Referees: Álvarez, Bustamante (ESP)

6 May 2026; 18:45	Füchse Berlin (Germany)	31–30	(Hungary) One Veszprém	Max-Schmeling-Halle, Berlin; Attendance: 8,796; Referees: Konjičanin, Konjičanin (BIH)
6 May 2026; 18:45	Gidsel 11	(17–15)	Descat 8	Max-Schmeling-Halle, Berlin; Attendance: 8,796; Referees: Konjičanin, Konjičanin (BIH)
6 May 2026; 18:45	2× (yellow card) 3× (suspension)	Report	2× (suspension)	Max-Schmeling-Halle, Berlin; Attendance: 8,796; Referees: Konjičanin, Konjičanin (BIH)

65–65 on aggregate. Füchse Berlin won 4–3 on penalties.

30 April 2026; 20:45	HBC Nantes (France)	30–32	(Spain) Barça	Palais des Sports de Beaulieu, Nantes; Attendance: 5,902; Referees: Jørum, Kleven (NOR)
30 April 2026; 20:45	Odriozola 6	(18–19)	Gómez 9	Palais des Sports de Beaulieu, Nantes; Attendance: 5,902; Referees: Jørum, Kleven (NOR)
30 April 2026; 20:45	1× (yellow card) 4× (suspension)	Report	2× (suspension)	Palais des Sports de Beaulieu, Nantes; Attendance: 5,902; Referees: Jørum, Kleven (NOR)

6 May 2026; 20:45	Barça (Spain)	31–21	(France) HBC Nantes	Palau Blaugrana, Barcelona; Attendance: 3,645; Referees: Lah, Sok (SLO)
6 May 2026; 20:45	Gómez 10	(15–12)	Briet 5	Palau Blaugrana, Barcelona; Attendance: 3,645; Referees: Lah, Sok (SLO)
6 May 2026; 20:45	1× (yellow card) 2× (suspension)	Report	1× (yellow card) 1× (suspension)	Palau Blaugrana, Barcelona; Attendance: 3,645; Referees: Lah, Sok (SLO)

Barça won 63–51 on aggregate.

29 April 2026; 18:45	Sporting CP (Portugal)	31–31	(Denmark) Aalborg Håndbold	Pavilhão João Rocha, Lisbon; Attendance: 2,651; Referees: Elíasson, Pálsson (ISL)
29 April 2026; 18:45	Costa 12	(16–16)	Arnoldsen 8	Pavilhão João Rocha, Lisbon; Attendance: 2,651; Referees: Elíasson, Pálsson (ISL)
29 April 2026; 18:45	2× (yellow card) 3× (suspension)	Report	1× (yellow card) 5× (suspension)	Pavilhão João Rocha, Lisbon; Attendance: 2,651; Referees: Elíasson, Pálsson (ISL)

6 May 2026; 20:45	Aalborg Håndbold (Denmark)	37–36	(Portugal) Sporting CP	Gigantium, Aalborg; Attendance: 5,500; Referees: Marín, García (ESP)
6 May 2026; 20:45	Arnoldsen 10	(18–17)	Costa 13	Gigantium, Aalborg; Attendance: 5,500; Referees: Marín, García (ESP)
6 May 2026; 20:45	1× (yellow card) 3× (suspension)	Report	1× (yellow card) 5× (suspension)	Gigantium, Aalborg; Attendance: 5,500; Referees: Marín, García (ESP)

Aalborg Håndbold won 68–67 on aggregate.

29 April 2026; 18:45	OTP Bank – Pick Szeged (Hungary)	28–35	(Germany) SC Magdeburg	Pick Aréna, Szeged; Attendance: 5,665; Referees: Boričić, Marković (SRB)
29 April 2026; 18:45	Šoštarić 9	(14–15)	Kristjánsson, Lagergren 7	Pick Aréna, Szeged; Attendance: 5,665; Referees: Boričić, Marković (SRB)
29 April 2026; 18:45	1× (yellow card) 3× (suspension)	Report	1× (yellow card) 4× (suspension)	Pick Aréna, Szeged; Attendance: 5,665; Referees: Boričić, Marković (SRB)

7 May 2026; 18:45	SC Magdeburg (Germany)	45–37	(Hungary) OTP Bank – Pick Szeged	GETEC Arena, Magdeburg; Attendance: 6,437; Referees: Martins, Martins (POR)
7 May 2026; 18:45	Magnússon 8	(23–19)	Smárason 7	GETEC Arena, Magdeburg; Attendance: 6,437; Referees: Martins, Martins (POR)
7 May 2026; 18:45	1× (yellow card) 4× (suspension)	Report	1× (yellow card) 3× (suspension) 1× (red card)	GETEC Arena, Magdeburg; Attendance: 6,437; Referees: Martins, Martins (POR)

SC Magdeburg won 80–65 on aggregate.

== Final four ==
The final four was held at the Lanxess Arena in Cologne, Germany on 13 and 14 June 2025. The draw was held on 12 May 2026.

=== Bracket ===
Semi-finals
13 June
(Denmark) Aalborg Håndbold	32
(Spain) Barça (ET)	37
13 June
(Germany) SC Magdeburg	35
(Germany) Füchse Berlin	40

Final
14 June
(Spain) Barça	37
(Germany) Füchse Berlin	34
Third place
14 June
(Denmark) Aalborg Håndbold	26
(Germany) SC Magdeburg	32

=== Semifinals ===
13 June 2026; 15:00	SC Magdeburg (Germany)	35–40	(Germany) Füchse Berlin	Lanxess Arena, Cologne; Attendance: 20,122; Referees: Pavićević, Ražnatović (MNE)
13 June 2026; 15:00	Magnússon 9	(17–19)	Gidsel 9	Lanxess Arena, Cologne; Attendance: 20,122; Referees: Pavićević, Ražnatović (MNE)
13 June 2026; 15:00	2× (yellow card) 4× (suspension)	Report	1× (yellow card) 3× (suspension)	Lanxess Arena, Cologne; Attendance: 20,122; Referees: Pavićević, Ražnatović (MNE)

13 June 2026
18:00
Aalborg Håndbold (Denmark)
32–37 (ET)
(Spain) Barça
Lanxess Arena, Cologne
Attendance: 20,122
Referees: Konjičanin, Konjičanin (BIH)
Arnoldsen, Blonz 5
(11–15)
Gómez 8
3× (suspension)
Report
1× (yellow card) 2× (suspension)

FT: 28–28 ET: 4–9

=== Third place game ===
14 June 2026; 15:00	Aalborg Håndbold (Denmark)	26–32	(Germany) SC Magdeburg	Lanxess Arena, Cologne; Attendance: 20,122; Referees: Gasmi, Gasmi (FRA)
14 June 2026; 15:00	Hangaard 6	(11–17)	Claar, Lagergren 6	Lanxess Arena, Cologne; Attendance: 20,122; Referees: Gasmi, Gasmi (FRA)
14 June 2026; 15:00	2× (suspension)	Report	2× (suspension)	Lanxess Arena, Cologne; Attendance: 20,122; Referees: Gasmi, Gasmi (FRA)

=== Final ===
14 June 2026; 18:00	Barça (Spain)	37–34	(Germany) Füchse Berlin	Lanxess Arena, Cologne; Attendance: 20,122; Referees: Jørum, Kleven (NOR)
14 June 2026; 18:00	Frade 7	(20–16)	Gidsel 8	Lanxess Arena, Cologne; Attendance: 20,122; Referees: Jørum, Kleven (NOR)
14 June 2026; 18:00	1× (yellow card) 2× (suspension) 1× (red card)	Report	2× (yellow card) 2× (suspension) 1× (red card)	Lanxess Arena, Cologne; Attendance: 20,122; Referees: Jørum, Kleven (NOR)
