= Sporting CP (handball) =

Portuguese handball club

- Full name: Sporting Clube de Portugal
- Founded: 1932; 94 years ago (parent club in 1906)
- Arena: Pavilhão João Rocha, Lisbon
- Capacity: 3,000
- President: Frederico Varandas
- Head coach: Ricardo Costa
- League: Andebol 1
- 2025–26: Andebol 1, 1st of 16 (champions)
- Club colours
Home	Away

Sporting Clube de Portugal (Portuguese pronunciation: [sɨˈpɔɾtĩ ˈkluβɨ ðɨ puɾtuˈɣal]), otherwise referred to as Sporting CP is a professional handball club based in Lisbon, Portugal.

Created in 1932, the team competes in the Andebol 1 and plays its home matches at Pavilhão João Rocha.

Sporting CP is the most decorated handball club in Portugal, being the Portuguese team with the most titles, both domestic and international. The SCP Handball division has won 51 Domestic titles and 2 International.

== History ==
Handball was introduced in Sporting Clube de Portugal in 1932, under the influence of Salazar Carreira, who introduced the sport to the club. It was on 10 April that a Sporting Portugal team played its first game in the sport, then in the eleven-a-side variant, the only one practised at the time, with the team beating Centro de Armas 1-0. The first official match would take place a month later against the same opponent, on 15 May 1932.

Indoor handball, which later became known as seven-a-side handball, was approved by the International Handball Federation in 1937, but the first demonstration of this variant in Portugal only took place on 12 September 1949 at the Cascais skating rink, when a Sporting team faced and beat another from Dramático de Cascais by 25-5, setting the tone for what would become one of the most emblematic sports in Portugal: Evaristo Ribeiro; Artur Mira and Rui Lanceiro; Fernando Nunes; Pereira de Sousa; Domingos Vicente and Joaquim Chagas, with Pinto dos Santos deputising.

Officially, Sporting started seven-a-side handball in the 1950-51 season and the sport immediately took root in the club, winning the first national championship in Portugal the following season. Initially, the seven-a-side handball season began in the summer after the 11-a-side competitions had finished, which was justified by the fact that the players were practically the same.

Sporting dominated Portuguese handball, particularly in the sixties and seventies and even in the eighties, with emphasis on the period from 1966 to 1973, in which seven National Championships were won in eight possible, five of which were consecutive, with a mythical team that became known as Os Sete Magníficos (The Magnificent Seven).

In 1995, Sporting fans were forced to choose the modalities to keep in the club, due to financial problems, having chosen handball and futsal, leading to the closure of the basketball, rink hockey and volleyball sections (which in the meantime would be reactivated).

Sporting CP completed the 2023-24 league season undefeated in its 22 home and away matches and completed its first domestic triple. They completed a second domestic triple in the 2025 season surpassing their northern rivals for domestic titles won. They also achieved its highest EHF Champions League 2024-25 placing, by reaching the quarter finals and again in the 2025/26 season.

Sporting CP once again completed a third domestic triple in the 2026 season and have now won 11 domestic honours in a row, a national record.

== Facilities ==
=== Pavilhão João Rocha ===
Pavilhão João Rocha is a multi-sports arena located in Lisbon. Located next to the Estádio José Alvalade, it is the home of Sporting CP indoor sports teams and was named after former club president João Rocha.

== Kits ==
HOME
2009–10	2017–19	2021-

AWAY
2011–12	2014–15	2021-

== Honours ==
=== International Competitions ===
- EHF European Cup: 2

2009/2010, 2016/2017

=== Domestic Competitions ===
- Andebol 1: 24

1951/1952, 1955/1956, 1960/1961, 1965/1966, 1966/1967, 1968/1969, 1969/1970, 1970/1971, 1971/1972, 1972/1973, 1977/1978, 1978/1979, 1979/1980, 1980/1981, 1983/1984, 1985/1986, 2000/2001, 2004/2005*, 2005/2006*, 2016/2017, 2017/2018, 2023/2024, 2024/2025, 2025/2026

* Notes: Divisão de Elite

- Portuguese Cup: 20 - Record

1971/1972, 1972/1973, 1974/1975, 1980/1981, 1982/1983, 1987/1988, 1988/1989, 1997/1998, 2000/2001, 2002/2003, 2003/2004, 2004/2005, 2011/2012, 2012/2013, 2013/2014, 2021/2022, 2022/2023, 2023/2024, 2024/2025, 2025/2026

- Portuguese Super Cup: 7

1998, 2002, 2014, 2023, 2024, 2025, 2026

=== Regional Competitions ===
- Lisbon Championship: 16 :

1950–51 • 1951–52 • 1952–53 • 1954–55 • 1955–56 • 1956–57 • 1957–58 • 1959–60 • 1960–61 • 1961–62 • 1962–63 • 1963–64 • 1964–65 • 1965–66 • 1967–68 • 1968–69

== Awards ==
Awards received by players while playing for the club

IHF Young Male World Player of the Year

- (Portugal) Francisco Costa – 2025

EHF Best Young Player of the Season

- (Portugal) Martim Costa – 2024
- (Portugal) Francisco Costa – 2026

Handball Planet World Young Handball Player

- (Portugal) Luís Frade – 2020

IHF World Men's Handball Championship All-Star Team

- (Portugal) Martim Costa (Centre Back) – 2025

IHF World Men's Handball Championship Best Young Player

- (Portugal) Francisco Costa – 2025

European Men's Handball Championship All-Star Team

- (Portugal) Martim Costa (Left Back) – 2024
- (Portugal) Francisco Costa (Right Back) - 2026
- (Portugal) Salvador Salvador (Best Defender) - 2026

European Men's Handball Championship Top Goalscorer

- (Portugal) Martim Costa (54 goals) – 2024

European Men's Handball Championship Best Young Player

- (Portugal) Francisco Costa – 2026

African Men's Handball Championship

- (Egypt) Mohamed Aly (Best Goalkeeper) - 2026

== Current squad ==
Squad for the 2025–26 season

Goalkeepers

- 20 (Norway) André Kristensen
- 92 (Egypt) Mohamed Aly
- 99 (Portugal) Santiago Póvoas

Left Wingers

- 17 (Iceland) Orri Freyr Þorkelsson
- 22 (Portugal) Diogo Branquinho

Right Wingers

- 5 (Spain) Carlos Álvarez
- 19 (Spain) Mamadou Gassama

Line players

- 2 (Brazil) Edy Silva
- 44 (Democratic Republic of the Congo) Christian Moga
- 93 (Spain) Víctor Romero

Left Backs

- 13 (Portugal) Salvador Salvador
- 79 (Portugal) Martim Costa

Central Backs

- 7 (Spain) Natan Suárez
- 8 (Spain) Jan Gurri
- 9 (Argentina) Pedro Martínez
- 26 (Portugal) Filipe Monteiro

Right Backs

- 3 (Sweden) Emil Berlin
- 6 (Portugal) Francisco Costa

=== Staff ===
- Head coach: (Portugal) Ricardo Costa
- Assistant coach: (Portugal) Pedro Biscaia
- Assistant coach: (Portugal) Ricardo Candeias

=== Transfers ===
Transfers for the 2026–27 season

Joining

- (Italy) Christian Manojlović (LB) on loan from (Romania) SCM Politehnica Timișoara
- (Cuba) Maiko Vázquez (LB) back from loan at (Portugal) AA Avanca
- (Portugal) Rafael Vasconcelos (RB) back from loan at (Portugal) ABC Braga

Leaving

- (Cuba) Maiko Vázquez (LB) on loan at (Spain) Club Balonmano Nava
- (Portugal) Rafael Vasconcelos (RB) on loan at (Spain) CB Eón Alicante

=== Transfer History ===
Transfers for the 2025–26 season

Joining

- (Spain) Carlos Álvarez (RW) from (Spain) CB Ademar León
- (Spain) Víctor Romero (LP) from (Spain) BM Granollers
- (Sweden) Emil Berlin (RB) from (Sweden) IK Sävehof
- (Portugal) Filipe Monteiro (CB) from (Portugal) ABC Braga

Leaving

- (Sweden) William Höghielm (LP) to (Sweden) IFK Kristianstad
- (Portugal) Pedro Portela (RW) to (Portugal) Águas Santas
- (Portugal) João Gomes (RB) to (Germany) VfL Gummersbach
- (Portugal) Rafael Vasconcelos (RB) on loan at (Portugal) ABC Braga

== Results in European competitions ==
Note: Sporting score is always listed first.

Season	Competition	Round	Club	1st leg	2nd leg	Aggregate
1966–67	EHF European Cup	R1	(France) US Ivry Handball	19–22	8–25	27–47
1967–68	EHF European Cup	R2	(Spain) BM Granollers	16–26	20–16	36–42
1969–70	EHF European Cup	R1	(Netherlands) HV Sittardia	16–24	12–15	28–39
1970–71	EHF European Cup	R2	(Soviet Union) MAI Moscovo	-	-	Win Withdrew
1970–71	EHF European Cup	QF	(Czechoslovakia) Dukla Prague	-	-	Win Withdrew
1970–71	EHF European Cup	SF	(Germany) VfL Gummersbach	17–25	11–27	28–50
1971–72	EHF European Cup	R2	(Germany) VfL Gummersbach	6–38	20–20	26–59
1972–73	EHF European Cup	R1	(Czechoslovakia) HCB Karviná	11–24	15–16	26–40
1973–74	EHF Challenge Cup	R1	(Belgium) SK Avanti Lebbeke	16–16	16–9	32–25
1973–74	EHF Challenge Cup	R2	(Czechoslovakia) Cervena Hezda	14–31	15–17	29–48
1975–76	EHF Cup Winners' Cup	L16	(Denmark) Frederiksberg IF	14–25	22–24	36–49
1978–79	EHF European Cup	R1	(France) Stella St-Maur	18–18	12–22	30–40
1979–80	EHF European Cup	R1	(Switzerland) Grasshoppers Zürich	23–23	19–23	42–46
1980–81	EHF European Cup	R1	(Switzerland) BSV Bern	12–26	21–20	33–46
1981–82	EHF Cup Winners' Cup	R1	(France) USM Gagny	25–27	22–31	47–58
1987–88	EHF Cup	R1	(Netherlands) Hershi Gellen	18–20	22–16	40–36
1987–88	EHF Cup	L16	(Denmark) Hellerup Kopenhagen	19–23	19–25	38–48
1988–89	EHF Cup Winners' Cup	R1	(Switzerland) Pfadi Winterthur	29–25	19–27	48–52
1989–90	EHF Cup Winners' Cup	R1	(Israel) Hapoel Rishon LeZion	24–40	23–18	47–58
1992–93	EHF Cup Winners' Cup	R1	(Italy) Pallamano Trieste	20–32	30–20	50–52
1996–97	EHF Cup	R1	(France) Montpellier HB	22–16	16–22	38–38
1997–98	EHF Cup Winners' Cup	R1	(Ukraine) ZTR Zaporizhzhia	31–25	23–24	54–49
1997–98	EHF Cup Winners' Cup	L16	(Germany) HSG Dutenhofen	16–24	30–26	46–50
1998–99	EHF Cup Winners' Cup	R1	(Slovakia) TJ VSŽ Košice	24–22	18–24	42–46
1999–00	EHF Challenge Cup	R1	(France) US Dunkerque HB	23–18	20–26	43–44
2000–01	EHF Cup	R2	(Netherlands) Showbizcity Aalsmeer	31–23	30–30	61–53
2000–01	EHF Cup	R3	(Belarus) SKA Minsk	31–23	18–18	49–41
2000–01	EHF Cup	L16	(Spain) CB Cantabria	29–27	30–26	59–53
2000–01	EHF Cup	QF	(Iceland) Haukar Handball	21–21	32–33	53–54
2001–02	EHF Champions League	R2	(Romania) Steaua București	33–24	25–25	58–49
2001–02	EHF Champions League	Group stage	(Spain) Portland San Antonio	26–36	28–31	3rd place
2001–02	EHF Champions League	Group stage	(Serbia and Montenegro) RK Lovćen	22–26	10–0	3rd place
2001–02	EHF Champions League	Group stage	(Denmark) Kolding IF	24–23	22–33	3rd place
2003–04	EHF Cup Winners' Cup	R2	(Luxembourg) HC Berchem	31–20	32–22	63–42
2003–04	EHF Cup Winners' Cup	R3	(Ukraine) Portovik Yuzhny	27–25	25–21	52–46
2003–04	EHF Cup Winners' Cup	L16	(Sweden) Redbergslids IK	29–19	29–35	58–54
2003–04	EHF Cup Winners' Cup	QF	(Slovenia) RK Gorenje Velenje	33–27	26–32	59–59
2004–05	EHF Cup Winners' Cup	R2	(Austria) Goldmann Druck Tulln	33–32	30–22	63–54
2004–05	EHF Cup Winners' Cup	R3	(Germany) HSV Hamburg	24–28	24–25	48–53
2005–06	EHF Cup Winners' Cup	R2	(Estonia) HC Kehra	27–33	39–19	68–53
2005–06	EHF Cup Winners' Cup	R3	(Romania) HCM Constanta	30–32	22–28	52–60
2006–07	EHF Cup Winners' Cup	R2	(Cyprus) SPE Strovolos Nicosia	33–20	31–24	64–44
2006–07	EHF Cup Winners' Cup	R3	(Romania) Dinamo București	29–35	27–30	56–65
2009–10	EHF Challenge Cup; Winner	L16	(Greece) AO Dimou Thermaikou	39–24	34–20	73–44
2009–10	EHF Challenge Cup; Winner	QF	(Romania) CSM Bacău	30–24	23–28	53–52
2009–10	EHF Challenge Cup; Winner	SF	(Slovenia) RD Slovan	28–23	30–33	58–56
2009–10	EHF Challenge Cup; Winner	F	(Poland) MMTS Kwidzyn	27–25	27–26	54–51
2010–11	EHF Challenge Cup	R3	(Ukraine) HC Polytechnik	26–21	26–30	52–51
2010–11	EHF Challenge Cup	L16	(Greece) AEK	27–23	27–32	54–55
2011–12	EHF Challenge Cup	R3	(Turkey) Trabzonspor	31–29	41–18	72–47
2011–12	EHF Challenge Cup	L16	(Czech Republic) HC Zubří	23–26	25–22	48–48
2011–12	EHF Challenge Cup	QF	(Romania) CSU Suceava	33–24	30–24	63–48
2011–12	EHF Challenge Cup	SF	(Switzerland) Wacker Thun	31–29	26–28	57–57
2012–13	EHF Cup	R1	(Sweden) Ystads IF	27–22	26–37	53–59
2013–14	EHF Cup	R2	(Netherlands) KRAS/Volendam	30–18	35–32	65–50
2013–14	EHF Cup	R3	(Croatia) RK Poreč	24–24	30–25	54–49
2013–14	EHF Cup	Group stage	(France) Montpellier HB	27–28	31–36	2nd place
2013–14	EHF Cup	Group stage	(North Macedonia) RK Strumica	39–22	36–24	2nd place
2013–14	EHF Cup	Group stage	(Denmark) Skjern	32–25	30–28	2nd place
2013–14	EHF Cup	QF	(Hungary) Pick Szeged	29–27	22–28	51–55
2014–15	EHF Cup	R2	(Slovakia) HC Sporta Hlohovec	34–24	28–33	62–57
2014–15	EHF Cup	R3	(Spain) Fraikin BM. Granollers	27–25	23–25	50–50
2015–16	EHF Cup	R2	(Denmark) Team Tvis Holstebro	31–36	32–28	63–64
2016–17	EHF Challenge Cup; Winner	R3	(Italy) ASD Romagna Handball	32–25	37–24	69–49
2016–17	EHF Challenge Cup; Winner	L16	(North Macedonia) RK Pelister	32–18	34–26	66–44
2016–17	EHF Challenge Cup; Winner	QF	(Greece) AC Doukas	35–23	27–25	62–48
2016–17	EHF Challenge Cup; Winner	SF	(Netherlands) JMS Hurry-Up	32–27	37–14	69–41
2016–17	EHF Challenge Cup; Winner	F	(Romania) AHC Potaissa Turda	37–28	30–24	67–52
2017–18	EHF Champions League	qSF	(Finland) Riihimäki Cocks	31–27		31–27
2017–18	EHF Champions League	qF	(Austria) Alpla HC Hard	35–34		35–34
2017–18	EHF Champions League	Group stage	(Turkey) Beşiktaş	30–26	34–27	4th place
2017–18	EHF Champions League	Group stage	(Ukraine) Motor Zaporizhzhia	23–31	29–32	4th place
2017–18	EHF Champions League	Group stage	(North Macedonia) Metalurg Skopje	27–28	31–27	4th place
2017–18	EHF Champions League	Group stage	(France) Montpellier HB	29–33	32–33	4th place
2017–18	EHF Champions League	Group stage	(Russia) Chekhovskiye Medvedi	31–30	27–30	4th place
2021–22	EHF European League	Group stage	(Hungary) Tatabánya KC	37–23	34–26	4th place
2021–22	EHF European League	Group stage	(Greece) AEK H.C.	24–25	31–30	4th place
2021–22	EHF European League	Group stage	(Switzerland) Kadetten Schaffhausen	34–26	31–24	4th place
2021–22	EHF European League	Group stage	(North Macedonia) RK Eurofarm Pelister	24–26	27–26	4th place
2021–22	EHF European League	Group stage	(France) USAM Nîmes Gard	32–30	27–33	4th place
2021–22	EHF European League	Last 16	(Germany) SC Magdeburg	29–29	35–36	64–65
2022–23	EHF European League	Group stage	(Austria) Alpla HC Hard	31–30	31–26	2nd place
2022–23	EHF European League	Group stage	(Spain) BM Granollers	29–32	38–31	2nd place
2022–23	EHF European League	Group stage	(Croatia) RK Nexe Našice	31–32	28–34	2nd place
2022–23	EHF European League	Group stage	(Hungary) Balatonfüredi KSE	35–32	31–25	2nd place
2022–23	EHF European League	Group stage	(Denmark) Skjern Håndbold	30–28	28–24	2nd place
2022–23	EHF European League	L16	(Spain) CD Bidasoa	27–30	34–28	61–58
2022–23	EHF European League	QF	(France) Montpellier HB	32–32	30–31	62–63
2023–24	EHF European League	Group stage	(Romania) CSM Constanța	28–29	34–28	2nd place
2023–24	EHF European League	Group stage	(Poland) Chrobry Głogów	37–20	35–22	2nd place
2023–24	EHF European League	Group stage	(Hungary) MOL-Tatabánya KC	29–31	36–28	2nd place
2023–24	EHF European League	Main round	(Romania) Dinamo București	35–33	31–27	1st place
2023–24	EHF European League	Main round	(Germany) Füchse Berlin	32–31	32–28	1st place
2023–24	EHF European League	QF	(Germany) Rhein-Neckar Löwen	29–32	29–28	58–60
2024–25	EHF Champions League	Group stage	(Poland) Orlen Wisła Płock	34–29	29–29	2nd place
2024–25	EHF Champions League	Group stage	(Denmark) Fredericia HK	37–19	32–29	2nd place
2024–25	EHF Champions League	Group stage	(Hungary) Telekom Veszprém	39–30	32–33	2nd place
2024–25	EHF Champions League	Group stage	(North Macedonia) RK Eurofarm Pelister	24–24	30–24	2nd place
2024–25	EHF Champions League	Group stage	(Germany) Füchse Berlin	35–33	32–33	2nd place
2024–25	EHF Champions League	Group stage	(Romania) CS Dinamo București	29–33	34–25	2nd place
2024–25	EHF Champions League	Group stage	(France) Paris Saint-Germain	28–30	39–28	2nd place
2024–25	EHF Champions League	QF	(France) HBC Nantes	27–28	30–32	57–60
2025–26	EHF Champions League	Group stage	(Romania) CS Dinamo București	33–30	30–29	6th place
2025–26	EHF Champions League	Group stage	(Poland) Industria Kielce	41–37	33–39	6th place
2025–26	EHF Champions League	Group stage	(Denmark) Aalborg Håndbold	30–35	35–33	6th place
2025–26	EHF Champions League	Group stage	(France) HBC Nantes	28–39	27–38	6th place
2025–26	EHF Champions League	Group stage	(Hungary) One Veszprém	33–32	31–32	6th place
2025–26	EHF Champions League	Group stage	(Norway) Kolstad Håndball	34–30	44–31	6th place
2025–26	EHF Champions League	Group stage	(Germany) Füchse Berlin	37–38	29–33	6th place
2025–26	EHF Champions League	Playoffs	(France) Orlen Wisła Płock	33–29	27–28	60–57
2025–26	EHF Champions League	QF	(Denmark) Aalborg Håndbold	31–31	36–37	67–68
