= Orri Freyr Þorkelsson =

Icelandic handball player (born 1999)

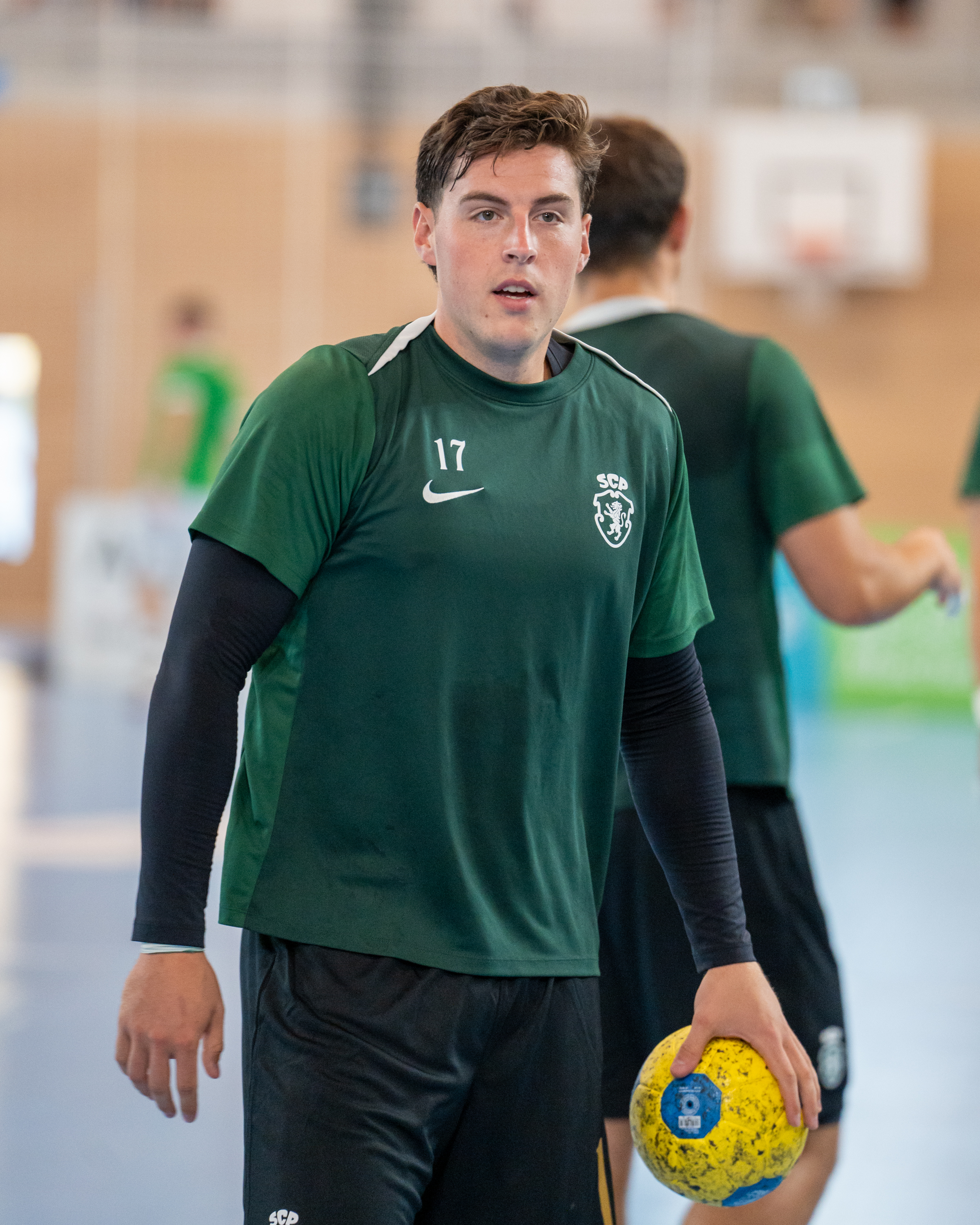

Personal information
- Nationality: Icelandic
- Born: 25 June 1999 (age 27) Reykjavík, Iceland
- Height: 1.84 m (6 ft 0 in)

Sport
- Sport: Handball
- Position: Left wing
- Current club: Sporting CP
- Number: 17

Youth career
- Years: Team
- –2016: Haukar

Senior clubs
- Years: Team
- 2016–2021: Haukar
- 2021–2023: Elverum
- 2023–: Sporting CP
National team
Years	Team	Apps	(Gls)
2020–	Iceland	30	(94)

Orri Freyr Þorkelsson (born 25 June 1999) is an Icelandic handball player for Sporting CP and the Icelandic national team.

He represented Iceland at the 2025 World Men's Handball Championship.

At the 2026 European Men's Handball Championship he finished 4th with Iceland, losing to Denmark in the semifinal and Croatia in the third-place playoff.

== Personal life ==
Orri's sister, Elín Klara Þorkelsdóttir, is also a handball player and plays for the Iceland women's national handball team.
