= Luís Frade =

Portuguese handball player (born 1998)

Personal information
- Full name: Luís Diogo Sousa Frade
- Born: 11 September 1998 (age 28) Rio Tinto, Portugal
- Height: 1.94 m (6 ft 4 in)

Sport
- Sport: Handball
- Position: Pivot
- Current club: FC Barcelona
- Number: 82

Senior clubs
- Years: Team
- 2015–2018: AA Águas Santas
- 2018–2020: Sporting CP
- 2020–: FC Barcelona
National team
Years	Team	Apps	(Gls)
2019-	Portugal	87	(198)
- Updated on 14 January 2026

Luís Diogo Sousa Frade (born 11 September 1998) is a Portuguese handball player for FC Barcelona and the Portuguese national team.

== Career ==
=== Early career ===
As a kid Frade played primarily Rugby and Basketball, and only discovered handball at the age of 14.

In 2015 he Joined Portuguese first league team AA Águas Santas. In 2018 he joined Portuguese top team Sporting CP. In his first season at the club he came in second place in the Portuguese League Andebol 1.

=== FC Barcelona ===
In 2020 he joined FC Barcelona on a four year deal. In his first season at the club he reached the final of the EHF Champions League, where Barcelona lost the German side THW Kiel. In this season he was named best young player in the world by Handball Planet. The following season in 2021 he won the EHF Champions League, beating Danish team Aalborg Håndbold in the final.

=== National team ===
He represented Portugal at the 2020 European Men's Handball Championship where Portugal came 6th.

In 2025 he was part of the Portugal team that reached the semifinals of the World Championship for the first time in history. They lost the semifinals to Denmark and the third place playoff to France. At the 2026 European Men's Handball Championship he was part of the Portugal team that got 5th place, their best ever finish at a European Championship.

== Honours ==
- EHF Champions League:
  - Winner: 2021, 2022, 2024, 2026
- Liga ASOBAL:
  - Winner: 2020–21, 2021–22, 2022–23, 2023–24
- Copa ASOBAL:
  - Winner: 2023, 2024
- Copa del Rey:
  - Winner: 2023
- Supercopa Ibérica:
  - Winner: 2022

Individual awards

- Handball-Planet - Best young player in the world: 2020
