= Szymon Sićko =

Polish handball player (born 1997)

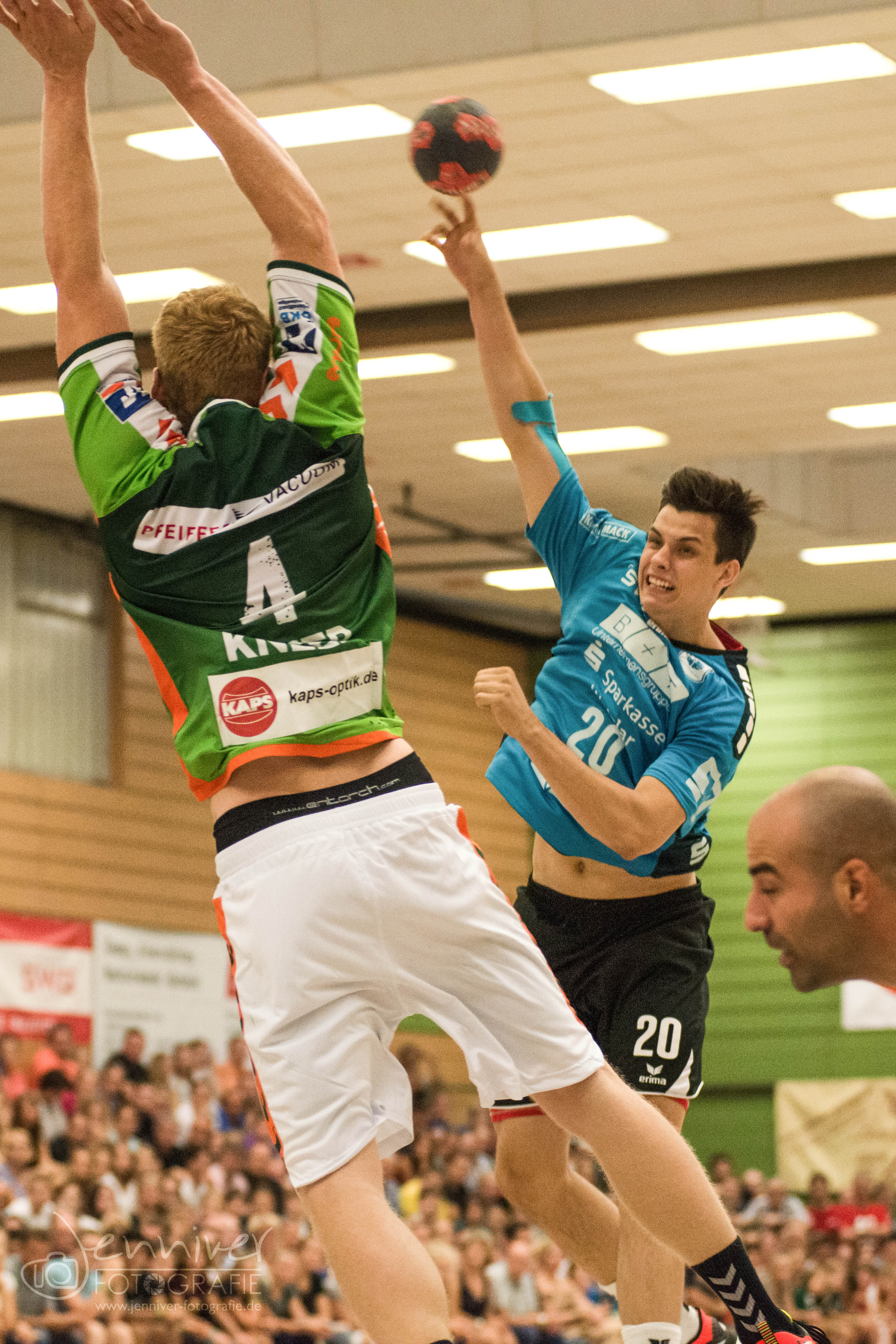

Personal information
- Nationality: Polish
- Born: 20 August 1997 (age 29) Dąbrowa Białostocka, Poland
- Height: 2.00 m (6 ft 7 in)

Sport
- Sport: Handball
- Position: Left back
- Current club: Industria Kielce
- Number: 9

Senior clubs
- Years: Team
- 2013–2016: SMS Gdańsk
- 2016–2017: Chrobry Głogów
- 2017–: Industria Kielce
- 2017–2018: → TV Hüttenberg (loan)
- 2018–2020: → NMC Górnik Zabrze (loan)
National team
Years	Team	Apps	(Gls)
2017–	Poland	41	(141)
- Updated on 28 December 2022

Szymon Sićko (born 20 August 1997) is a Polish handball player for Industria Kielce and the Polish national team.

== Career ==
He made his debut for the national team on 8 June 2017, in a friendly match against Sweden (27:33). He threw his first goal on 28 December 2018, in a match against Japan (29:28).

He represented Poland at the 2020 European Men's Handball Championship.

He missed the 2026 European Men's Handball Championship due to a knee injury.
