= Elohim Prandi =

French handball player (born 1998)

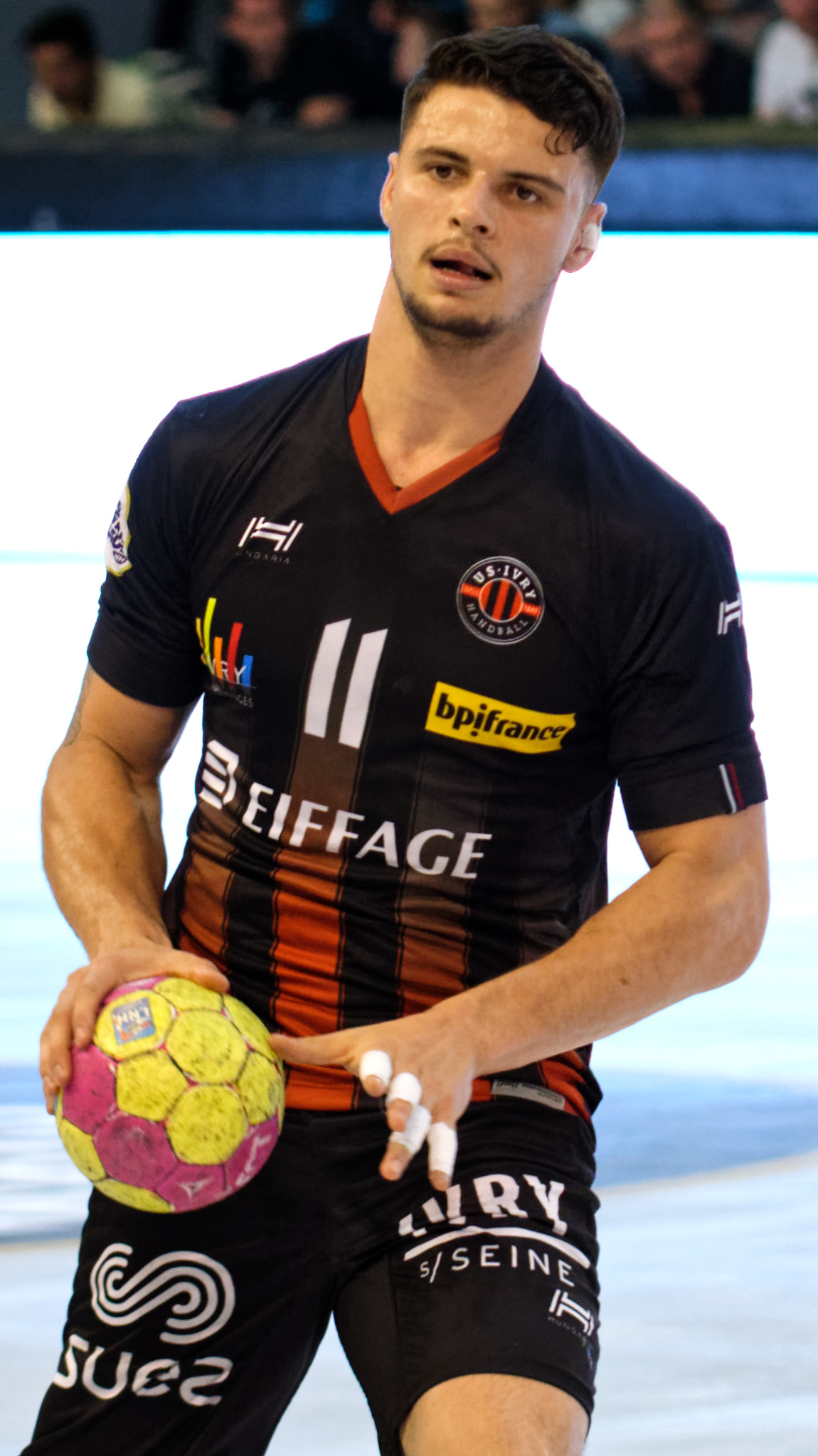
- Prandi in 2017

Personal information
- Nationality: French
- Born: 24 August 1998 (age 28) Istres, France
- Height: 1.93 m (6 ft 4 in)

Sport
- Sport: Handball
- Position: Left back
- Current club: Paris Saint-Germain
- Number: 71

Youth career
- Years: Team
- 2006-2012: Torcy HB
- 2012-2013: C'Chartres MH
- 2013–2017: US Ivry

Senior clubs
- Years: Team
- 2017–2020: USAM Nîmes Gard
- 2020–: Paris Saint-Germain
National team
Years	Team	Apps	(Gls)
2019–	France	56	(142)
Medal record
World Championship
Silver medal – second place	2023 Poland/Sweden
Bronze medal – third place	2025 Croatia/Denmark/Norway
European Championship
Gold medal – first place	2024 Germany
- Updated on 3 February 2025

Elohim Prandi (born 24 August 1998) is a French professional handball player for Paris Saint-Germain Handball and the French national team.

== Club career ==
Prandi played from 2013 for the youth team of US Ivry HB. In March 2016 he made his debut for the senior team, and during the 2016-17 he played 24 games for the first team.

He then joined USAM Nîmes Gard, where he reached the final of the French Cup in 2018, where they lost to PSG 32-26. In the 2019-20 season, he was part of the French league All-Star team as the left back.

In 2020 he joined PSG, where he has won the French Championship in every season from 2021 to 2024, as well as the 2021 French Cup. At the EHF Excellence Awards in 2024, he was named the best left back.

In July 2023, he broke his left hand during a league match against Handball Club de Nantes.

=== National team ===
Prandi made his debut for the French national team on 29 October 2019 against Denmark.

He represented France at the 2020 European Men's Handball Championship

At the 2023 World Championship, he won a silver medal, losing to Denmark in the final.

He won gold medals at the 2024 European Championship. In the semifinal against Sweden, he scored a sensational but controversial last-second goal that the European Handball Federation later admitted should not have counted. The Swedish national team made a formal complaint after the match, which was, however, rejected by EHF.

At the 2025 World Championship he won bronze medals with France, losing to Croatia in the semifinal and beating Portugal in the third-place playoff. During the tournament he played 8 games and scored 18 goals.

== Honours ==
- EHF Excellence Awards: Left Back of the Season 2023/24
