= Thomas Arnoldsen =

Danish handball player (born 2002)

Thomas Sommer Arnoldsen
Personal information
- Nationality: Danish
- Born: 11 January 2002 (age 24) Aarhus, Denmark
- Height: 1.94 m (6 ft 4 in)

Sport
- Sport: Handball
- Position: Centre/Left back
- Current club: Aalborg Håndbold
- Number: 7

Youth career
- Years: Team
- –2020: Skanderborg Aarhus Håndbold

Senior clubs
- Years: Team
- 2020–2023: Skanderborg Aarhus Håndbold
- 2023–: Aalborg Håndbold
National team
Years	Team	Apps	(Gls)
2023–	Denmark	33	(83)
Medal record
Olympic Games
Gold medal – first place	2024 Paris	Team
World Championship
Gold medal – first place	2025 Croatia/Denmark/Norway
European Championship
Gold medal – first place	2026 Denmark/Norway/Sweden
European Youth Summer Olympic Festival
Bronze medal – third place	2019 Baku	Team
- Updated on 3 February 2026

Thomas Sommer Arnoldsen (born 11 January 2002) is a Danish handball player for Aalborg Håndbold and the Danish national team. His brother Frederik Arnoldsen is also a handball player for Skanderborg Aarhus Håndbold.

== Career ==
Arnoldsen started playing handball at his hometown club Skanderborg Aarhus Håndbold. In the 2020/21 season, he was promoted to the first team. In his debut season, he scored 144 goals and recorded 143 assists, earning the Årets Talent award in the HTH Ligaen.

In 2023, he transferred to Aalborg Håndbold. At the start of the season, he was sidelined by an injury. In 2024, he won the Danish Championship with Aalborg Håndbold, and in 2025, he won the Danish Cup, defeating Bjerringbro-Silkeborg in the final.

From 8 March to 28 April 2025, he took a break from handball due to exhaustion. He returned in a league match against Skanderborg Aarhus Håndbold. Later that season, he won the Danish championship.

In October 2025, he extended his contract with Aalborg until 2029. A month later he was injured with a broken shinbone, which was expected to keep him out of the 2026 European Men's Handball Championship.

=== National team ===
He represented Denmark at the 2022 European Under-20 Championship and the 2023 Junior World Championship. He debuted for the Danish national team on 9 March 2023 in a 30–23 win against Germany, scoring seven goals. At the 2024 Olympics, he won a gold medal with the Danish team.

At the 2025 World Championship he won gold medals with the Danish team.

He almost missed the 2026 European Men's Handball Championship due to a shinbone injury. He was however called up later during the main round to replace the injured Lukas Jørgensen, when he recovered from his injured faster than anticipated. Denmark would go on to win gold medals, meaning that they now held both the World, European and Olympic titles at the same time, as only the second team ever after France's 'Les Experts'. Arnoldsen played a key role in both the semifinal and final.

== Individual awards ==
- All-Star team as Best centre back at the 2022 European Men's U-20 Handball Championship
- Talent of the year in the HTH Ligaen 2021/22
- All-Star team in the Danish League: 2022/23, 2025/26
- Team Danmark's 'Årets Fund' 2024
- Danish Men's Handball Cup 2024 MVP (Danish: Årets Pokalfighter)
