= 2023–24 EHF Champions League group stage =

Event

The 2023–24 EHF Champions League group stage was played between 13 September 2023 and 7 March 2024 to determine the twelve teams advancing to the knockout stage of the 2023–24 EHF Champions League.

== Draw ==
The draw was held on 27 June 2023 in Vienna, Austria.

=== Seeding ===
The composition of the seeding pots for the group stage draw was announced on 20 June 2023. From Pot 1, three teams were drawn into Group A and the other two in Group B. From Pot 2, each team from the same national association (Germany, Poland, France, Denmark and Hungary) was drawn in the opposite groups, so they would not drawn into the same group. Groups A and B were completed by either two or three teams from Pot 3.

Pot 1	Pot 2	Pot 3
(Spain) Barça (Germany) THW Kiel (Poland) Industria Kielce (France) Paris Saint-Germain (Denmark) GOG Håndbold (Hungary) Telekom Veszprém	(Germany) SC Magdeburg (Poland) Orlen Wisła Płock (France) Montpellier Handball (Denmark) Aalborg Håndbold (Hungary) OTP Bank - Pick Szeged	(Portugal) FC Porto (Norway) Kolstad Håndball (Slovenia) Celje Pivovarna Laško (North Macedonia) RK Eurofarm Pelister (Croatia) RK Zagreb

== Format ==
In each group, teams played against each other in a double round-robin format, with home and away matches.

== Tiebreakers ==
In the group stage, teams were ranked according to points (2 points for a win, 1 point for a draw, 0 points for a loss). After completion of the group stage, if two or more teams have the same number of points, the ranking was determined as follows:

1. Highest number of points in matches between the teams directly involved;
2. Superior goal difference in matches between the teams directly involved;
3. Highest number of goals scored in matches between the teams directly involved;
4. Superior goal difference in all matches of the group;
5. Highest number of plus goals in all matches of the group;

If the ranking of one of these teams is determined, the above criteria are consecutively followed until the ranking of all teams is determined. If no ranking can be determined, a decision shall be obtained by EHF through drawing of lots.

== Groups ==
The matchdays were 13–14 September, 20–21 September, 27–28 September, 11–12 October, 18–19 October, 25–26 October, 15–16 November, 22–23 November, 29–30 November, 6–7 December 2023, 14–15 February, 21–22 February, 28–29 February, and 6–7 March 2024.

Times until 28 October 2023 are UTC+2, from 29 October 2023 on UTC+1.

=== Group A ===
Pos	Team	Pld	W	D	L	GF	GA	GD	Pts	Qualification
1	(Germany) THW Kiel	14	10	2	2	410	379	+31	22	Quarterfinals
2	(Denmark) Aalborg Håndbold	14	8	3	3	430	382	+48	19	Quarterfinals
3	(France) Paris Saint-Germain	14	8	1	5	431	412	+19	17	Playoffs
4	(Poland) Industria Kielce	14	6	4	4	413	402	+11	16	Playoffs
5	(Croatia) RK Zagreb	14	6	2	6	373	373	0	14	Playoffs
6	(Hungary) OTP Bank - Pick Szeged	14	6	1	7	401	414	−13	13	Playoffs
7	(Norway) Kolstad Håndball	14	5	1	8	393	401	−8	11	
8	(North Macedonia) RK Eurofarm Pelister	14	0	0	14	333	421	−88	0	

Source: EHF
Rules for classification: Tiebreakers

13 September 2023; 18:45	Industria Kielce (Poland)	31–34	(Denmark) Aalborg Håndbold	Hala Legionów, Kielce; Attendance: 3,800; Referees: Bonaventura, Bonaventura (FRA)
13 September 2023; 18:45	Sićko 11	(15–18)	Hansen 7	Hala Legionów, Kielce; Attendance: 3,800; Referees: Bonaventura, Bonaventura (FRA)
13 September 2023; 18:45	3× (suspension)	Report	4× (suspension) 1× (red card)	Hala Legionów, Kielce; Attendance: 3,800; Referees: Bonaventura, Bonaventura (FRA)

13 September 2023; 18:45	RK Eurofarm Pelister (North Macedonia)	22–31	(Norway) Kolstad Håndball	Boro Čurlevski Sports Hall, Bitola; Attendance: 3,000; Referees: Schulze, Tönnies (GER)
13 September 2023; 18:45	Radivojević 6	(10–16)	Aalberg 9	Boro Čurlevski Sports Hall, Bitola; Attendance: 3,000; Referees: Schulze, Tönnies (GER)
13 September 2023; 18:45	2× (suspension)	Report	1× (suspension)	Boro Čurlevski Sports Hall, Bitola; Attendance: 3,000; Referees: Schulze, Tönnies (GER)

14 September 2023; 18:45	OTP Bank - Pick Szeged (Hungary)	29–31	(France) Paris Saint-Germain	Pick Aréna, Szeged; Attendance: 4,700; Referees: Brunner, Salah (SUI)
14 September 2023; 18:45	Šoštarič 9	(13–16)	Syprzak 6	Pick Aréna, Szeged; Attendance: 4,700; Referees: Brunner, Salah (SUI)
14 September 2023; 18:45	2× (yellow card) 5× (suspension)	Report	4× (suspension)	Pick Aréna, Szeged; Attendance: 4,700; Referees: Brunner, Salah (SUI)

14 September 2023; 18:45	RK Zagreb (Croatia)	23–30	(Germany) THW Kiel	Arena Zagreb, Zagreb; Attendance: 4,874; Referees: Horváth, Marton (HUN)
14 September 2023; 18:45	Dibirov 4	(9–16)	Wiencek 8	Arena Zagreb, Zagreb; Attendance: 4,874; Referees: Horváth, Marton (HUN)
14 September 2023; 18:45	1× (yellow card) 5× (suspension)	Report	2× (yellow card) 4× (suspension) 1× (red card)	Arena Zagreb, Zagreb; Attendance: 4,874; Referees: Horváth, Marton (HUN)

20 September 2023; 20:45	Aalborg Håndbold (Denmark)	38–23	(North Macedonia) RK Eurofarm Pelister	Gigantium, Aalborg; Attendance: 5,072; Referees: Marín, García (ESP)
20 September 2023; 20:45	Vlah 7	(18–10)	Petrović 7	Gigantium, Aalborg; Attendance: 5,072; Referees: Marín, García (ESP)
20 September 2023; 20:45	1× (suspension)	Report	2× (yellow card) 2× (suspension)	Gigantium, Aalborg; Attendance: 5,072; Referees: Marín, García (ESP)

21 September 2023; 18:45	Paris Saint-Germain (France)	35–31	(Croatia) RK Zagreb	Stade Pierre de Coubertin, Paris; Attendance: 2,523; Referees: Caçador, Nicolau (POR)
21 September 2023; 18:45	Syprzak 8	(18–16)	Morales 7	Stade Pierre de Coubertin, Paris; Attendance: 2,523; Referees: Caçador, Nicolau (POR)
21 September 2023; 18:45	2× (suspension)	Report	6× (suspension) 1× (red card)	Stade Pierre de Coubertin, Paris; Attendance: 2,523; Referees: Caçador, Nicolau (POR)

21 September 2023; 18:45	THW Kiel (Germany)	35–32	(Hungary) OTP Bank - Pick Szeged	Wunderino Arena, Kiel; Attendance: 5,234; Referees: Lah, Sok (SLO)
21 September 2023; 18:45	Ekberg 7	(16–15)	Šoštarič 8	Wunderino Arena, Kiel; Attendance: 5,234; Referees: Lah, Sok (SLO)
21 September 2023; 18:45	1× (yellow card) 4× (suspension)	Report	5× (suspension)	Wunderino Arena, Kiel; Attendance: 5,234; Referees: Lah, Sok (SLO)

21 September 2023; 18:45	Kolstad Håndball (Norway)	30–32	(Poland) Industria Kielce	Trondheim Spektrum, Trondheim; Attendance: 5,611; Referees: Martins, Martins (POR)
21 September 2023; 18:45	Johannessen 8	(11–17)	Sićko 6	Trondheim Spektrum, Trondheim; Attendance: 5,611; Referees: Martins, Martins (POR)
21 September 2023; 18:45	1× (yellow card) 4× (suspension)	Report	4× (suspension)	Trondheim Spektrum, Trondheim; Attendance: 5,611; Referees: Martins, Martins (POR)

27 September 2023; 18:45	Industria Kielce (Poland)	30–29	(France) Paris Saint-Germain	Hala Legionów, Kielce; Attendance: 4,200; Referees: Mažeika, Gatelis (LTU)
27 September 2023; 18:45	Sićko 8	(16–15)	Syprzak 7	Hala Legionów, Kielce; Attendance: 4,200; Referees: Mažeika, Gatelis (LTU)
27 September 2023; 18:45	1× (yellow card) 4× (suspension)	Report	2× (suspension)	Hala Legionów, Kielce; Attendance: 4,200; Referees: Mažeika, Gatelis (LTU)

27 September 2023; 18:45	OTP Bank - Pick Szeged (Hungary)	34–27	(Denmark) Aalborg Håndbold	Pick Aréna, Szeged; Attendance: 4,032; Referees: Konjičanin, Konjičanin (BIH)
27 September 2023; 18:45	Šoštarič 9	(20–16)	Hansen 6	Pick Aréna, Szeged; Attendance: 4,032; Referees: Konjičanin, Konjičanin (BIH)
27 September 2023; 18:45	3× (suspension)	Report	1× (yellow card) 2× (suspension)	Pick Aréna, Szeged; Attendance: 4,032; Referees: Konjičanin, Konjičanin (BIH)

27 September 2023; 18:45	RK Eurofarm Pelister (North Macedonia)	20–23	(Germany) THW Kiel	Boro Čurlevski Sports Hall, Bitola; Attendance: 2,700; Referees: Brkic, Jusufhodzic (AUT)
27 September 2023; 18:45	Radivojević 5	(9–11)	Ekberg, Ellefsen á Skipagøtu 5	Boro Čurlevski Sports Hall, Bitola; Attendance: 2,700; Referees: Brkic, Jusufhodzic (AUT)
27 September 2023; 18:45	3× (suspension)	Report	2× (yellow card) 3× (suspension)	Boro Čurlevski Sports Hall, Bitola; Attendance: 2,700; Referees: Brkic, Jusufhodzic (AUT)

28 September 2023; 18:45	RK Zagreb (Croatia)	31–20	(Norway) Kolstad Håndball	Arena Zagreb, Zagreb; Attendance: 1,473; Referees: Kurtagic, Wetterwik (SWE)
28 September 2023; 18:45	Morales 8	(17–10)	Guðjónsson 11	Arena Zagreb, Zagreb; Attendance: 1,473; Referees: Kurtagic, Wetterwik (SWE)
28 September 2023; 18:45	1× (yellow card) 5× (suspension)	Report	1× (yellow card) 4× (suspension)	Arena Zagreb, Zagreb; Attendance: 1,473; Referees: Kurtagic, Wetterwik (SWE)

11 October 2023; 20:45	THW Kiel (Germany)	35–31	(Poland) Industria Kielce	Wunderino Arena, Kiel; Attendance: 6,071; Referees: Hansen, Madsen (DEN)
11 October 2023; 20:45	Ellefsen á Skipagøtu, Johansson 7	(15–16)	Sićko, Tournat 7	Wunderino Arena, Kiel; Attendance: 6,071; Referees: Hansen, Madsen (DEN)
11 October 2023; 20:45	8× (suspension)	Report	7× (suspension)	Wunderino Arena, Kiel; Attendance: 6,071; Referees: Hansen, Madsen (DEN)

12 October 2023; 18:45	RK Zagreb (Croatia)	30–30	(Denmark) Aalborg Håndbold	Arena Zagreb, Zagreb; Attendance: 5,018; Referees: Schulze, Tönnies (GER)
12 October 2023; 18:45	Srna 7	(15–15)	Hansen, Hoxer Hangaard 6	Arena Zagreb, Zagreb; Attendance: 5,018; Referees: Schulze, Tönnies (GER)
12 October 2023; 18:45	2× (yellow card) 6× (suspension) 1× (red card)	Report	1× (yellow card) 1× (suspension)	Arena Zagreb, Zagreb; Attendance: 5,018; Referees: Schulze, Tönnies (GER)

12 October 2023; 18:45	Kolstad Håndball (Norway)	37–24	(Hungary) OTP Bank - Pick Szeged	Trondheim Spektrum, Trondheim; Attendance: 5,121; Referees: Marín, García (ESP)
12 October 2023; 18:45	Guðjónsson, Lyse 8	(24–11)	three players 5	Trondheim Spektrum, Trondheim; Attendance: 5,121; Referees: Marín, García (ESP)
12 October 2023; 18:45	2× (yellow card) 2× (suspension) 1× (red card)	Report	5× (suspension)	Trondheim Spektrum, Trondheim; Attendance: 5,121; Referees: Marín, García (ESP)

12 October 2023; 20:45	Paris Saint-Germain (France)	31–26	(North Macedonia) RK Eurofarm Pelister	Stade Pierre de Coubertin, Paris; Attendance: 2,431; Referees: Erdoğan, Özdeniz (TUR)
12 October 2023; 20:45	Syprzak 7	(15–12)	three players 5	Stade Pierre de Coubertin, Paris; Attendance: 2,431; Referees: Erdoğan, Özdeniz (TUR)
12 October 2023; 20:45	1× (suspension)	Report	1× (yellow card) 3× (suspension) 1× (red card)	Stade Pierre de Coubertin, Paris; Attendance: 2,431; Referees: Erdoğan, Özdeniz (TUR)

18 October 2023; 20:45	Paris Saint-Germain (France)	33–30	(Denmark) Aalborg Håndbold	Stade Pierre de Coubertin, Paris; Attendance: 2,433; Referees: Lah, Sok (SLO)
18 October 2023; 20:45	Prandi 8	(15–14)	Hansen 7	Stade Pierre de Coubertin, Paris; Attendance: 2,433; Referees: Lah, Sok (SLO)
18 October 2023; 20:45	4× (suspension) 1× (red card)	Report	1× (yellow card) 4× (suspension)	Stade Pierre de Coubertin, Paris; Attendance: 2,433; Referees: Lah, Sok (SLO)

19 October 2023; 18:45	RK Zagreb (Croatia)	27–18	(North Macedonia) RK Eurofarm Pelister	Arena Zagreb, Zagreb; Attendance: 6,100; Referees: Martins, Martins (POR)
19 October 2023; 18:45	Kavčič, Kos 5	(10–10)	Borzaš 3	Arena Zagreb, Zagreb; Attendance: 6,100; Referees: Martins, Martins (POR)
19 October 2023; 18:45	1× (yellow card) 3× (suspension)	Report	1× (yellow card) 5× (suspension) 2× (red card)	Arena Zagreb, Zagreb; Attendance: 6,100; Referees: Martins, Martins (POR)

19 October 2023; 18:45	Kolstad Håndball (Norway)	34–30	(Germany) THW Kiel	Trondheim Spektrum, Trondheim; Attendance: 7,120; Referees: Elíasson, Pálsson (ISL)
19 October 2023; 18:45	Guðjónsson 10	(19–16)	Ekberg 10	Trondheim Spektrum, Trondheim; Attendance: 7,120; Referees: Elíasson, Pálsson (ISL)
19 October 2023; 18:45	1× (yellow card) 4× (suspension)	Report	2× (yellow card) 5× (suspension)	Trondheim Spektrum, Trondheim; Attendance: 7,120; Referees: Elíasson, Pálsson (ISL)

19 October 2023; 20:45	Industria Kielce (Poland)	27–27	(Hungary) OTP Bank - Pick Szeged	Hala Legionów, Kielce; Attendance: 4,200; Referees: Kurtagic, Wetterwik (SWE)
19 October 2023; 20:45	Moryto 6	(14–15)	Stepančić 6	Hala Legionów, Kielce; Attendance: 4,200; Referees: Kurtagic, Wetterwik (SWE)
19 October 2023; 20:45	1× (yellow card) 3× (suspension)	Report	1× (yellow card) 3× (suspension)	Hala Legionów, Kielce; Attendance: 4,200; Referees: Kurtagic, Wetterwik (SWE)

25 October 2023; 18:45	Aalborg Håndbold (Denmark)	27–25	(Norway) Kolstad Håndball	Gigantium, Aalborg; Attendance: 5,320; Referees: Horáček, Novotný (CZE)
25 October 2023; 18:45	Hangaard 7	(17–12)	Sagosen 10	Gigantium, Aalborg; Attendance: 5,320; Referees: Horáček, Novotný (CZE)
25 October 2023; 18:45	1× (suspension)	Report	4× (suspension)	Gigantium, Aalborg; Attendance: 5,320; Referees: Horáček, Novotný (CZE)

25 October 2023; 20:45	RK Eurofarm Pelister (North Macedonia)	21–24	(Poland) Industria Kielce	Boro Čurlevski Sports Hall, Bitola; Attendance: 3,000; Referees: Gasmi, Gasmi (FRA)
25 October 2023; 20:45	Radivojević 6	(8–14)	Olejniczak 5	Boro Čurlevski Sports Hall, Bitola; Attendance: 3,000; Referees: Gasmi, Gasmi (FRA)
25 October 2023; 20:45	6× (suspension)	Report	1× (yellow card) 5× (suspension)	Boro Čurlevski Sports Hall, Bitola; Attendance: 3,000; Referees: Gasmi, Gasmi (FRA)

26 October 2023; 18:45	OTP Bank - Pick Szeged (Hungary)	27–26	(Croatia) RK Zagreb	Pick Aréna, Szeged; Attendance: 4,515; Referees: Bonaventura, Bonaventura (FRA)
26 October 2023; 18:45	four players 4	(13–15)	Kos 5	Pick Aréna, Szeged; Attendance: 4,515; Referees: Bonaventura, Bonaventura (FRA)
26 October 2023; 18:45	1× (yellow card) 3× (suspension) 1× (red card)	Report	6× (suspension)	Pick Aréna, Szeged; Attendance: 4,515; Referees: Bonaventura, Bonaventura (FRA)

26 October 2023; 20:45	Paris Saint-Germain (France)	28–34	(Germany) THW Kiel	Stade Pierre de Coubertin, Paris; Attendance: 3,300; Referees: Marín, García (ESP)
26 October 2023; 20:45	Syprzak 8	(14–13)	Ellefsen á Skipagøtu, Reinkind 7	Stade Pierre de Coubertin, Paris; Attendance: 3,300; Referees: Marín, García (ESP)
26 October 2023; 20:45	1× (yellow card) 5× (suspension)	Report	1× (yellow card) 5× (suspension)	Stade Pierre de Coubertin, Paris; Attendance: 3,300; Referees: Marín, García (ESP)

15 November 2023; 18:45	Kolstad Håndball (Norway)	36–31	(France) Paris Saint-Germain	Trondheim Spektrum, Trondheim; Attendance: 8,900; Referees: Nikolov, Nachevski (MKD)
15 November 2023; 18:45	Abelvik Rød 12	(14–16)	Prandi, Syprzak 7	Trondheim Spektrum, Trondheim; Attendance: 8,900; Referees: Nikolov, Nachevski (MKD)
15 November 2023; 18:45	1× (yellow card) 4× (suspension)	Report	1× (yellow card) 1× (suspension)	Trondheim Spektrum, Trondheim; Attendance: 8,900; Referees: Nikolov, Nachevski (MKD)

16 November 2023; 18:45	THW Kiel (Germany)	18–27	(Denmark) Aalborg Håndbold	Wunderino Arena, Kiel; Attendance: 7,150; Referees: Martins, Martins (POR)
16 November 2023; 18:45	Ekberg 7	(6–11)	Barthold 5	Wunderino Arena, Kiel; Attendance: 7,150; Referees: Martins, Martins (POR)
16 November 2023; 18:45	1× (yellow card) 2× (suspension)	Report	1× (suspension)	Wunderino Arena, Kiel; Attendance: 7,150; Referees: Martins, Martins (POR)

16 November 2023; 18:45	RK Zagreb (Croatia)	22–22	(Poland) Industria Kielce	Arena Zagreb, Zagreb; Attendance: 6,120; Referees: Konjičanin, Konjičanin (BIH)
16 November 2023; 18:45	Kos 5	(11–10)	D. Dujshebaev 4	Arena Zagreb, Zagreb; Attendance: 6,120; Referees: Konjičanin, Konjičanin (BIH)
16 November 2023; 18:45	2× (yellow card) 6× (suspension)	Report	4× (suspension)	Arena Zagreb, Zagreb; Attendance: 6,120; Referees: Konjičanin, Konjičanin (BIH)

16 November 2023; 18:45	OTP Bank - Pick Szeged (Hungary)	34–26	(North Macedonia) RK Eurofarm Pelister	Pick Aréna, Szeged; Attendance: 3,246; Referees: Covalciuc, Covalciuc (MDA)
16 November 2023; 18:45	Šoštarič 9	(18–19)	Vasilev 5	Pick Aréna, Szeged; Attendance: 3,246; Referees: Covalciuc, Covalciuc (MDA)
16 November 2023; 18:45	4× (suspension)	Report	5× (suspension)	Pick Aréna, Szeged; Attendance: 3,246; Referees: Covalciuc, Covalciuc (MDA)

22 November 2023; 18:45	Aalborg Håndbold (Denmark)	27–27	(Germany) THW Kiel	Gigantium, Aalborg; Attendance: 5,500; Referees: Mažeika, Gatelis (LTU)
22 November 2023; 18:45	Hald, Nilsson 5	(13–17)	Bilyk 6	Gigantium, Aalborg; Attendance: 5,500; Referees: Mažeika, Gatelis (LTU)
22 November 2023; 18:45	1× (yellow card) 1× (suspension)	Report	2× (yellow card) 4× (suspension)	Gigantium, Aalborg; Attendance: 5,500; Referees: Mažeika, Gatelis (LTU)

22 November 2023; 18:45	RK Eurofarm Pelister (North Macedonia)	27–28	(Hungary) OTP Bank - Pick Szeged	Boro Čurlevski Sports Hall, Bitola; Attendance: 3,000; Referees: Gasmi, Gasmi (FRA)
22 November 2023; 18:45	Borzaš 6	(12–15)	Šoštarič 7	Boro Čurlevski Sports Hall, Bitola; Attendance: 3,000; Referees: Gasmi, Gasmi (FRA)
22 November 2023; 18:45	2× (yellow card) 5× (suspension) 1× (red card)	Report	3× (suspension)	Boro Čurlevski Sports Hall, Bitola; Attendance: 3,000; Referees: Gasmi, Gasmi (FRA)

22 November 2023; 20:45	Paris Saint-Germain (France)	28–28	(Norway) Kolstad Håndball	Stade Pierre de Coubertin, Paris; Attendance: 3,250; Referees: Merz, Kuttler (GER)
22 November 2023; 20:45	Prandi 10	(13–15)	Sagosen 10	Stade Pierre de Coubertin, Paris; Attendance: 3,250; Referees: Merz, Kuttler (GER)
22 November 2023; 20:45	1× (yellow card) 4× (suspension)	Report	2× (suspension)	Stade Pierre de Coubertin, Paris; Attendance: 3,250; Referees: Merz, Kuttler (GER)

23 November 2023; 18:45	Industria Kielce (Poland)	28–24	(Croatia) RK Zagreb	Hala Legionów, Kielce; Attendance: 4,200; Referees: Horáček, Novotný (CZE)
23 November 2023; 18:45	Wiaderny 5	(12–12)	Dibirov, Kos 5	Hala Legionów, Kielce; Attendance: 4,200; Referees: Horáček, Novotný (CZE)
23 November 2023; 18:45	3× (suspension)	Report	1× (yellow card) 4× (suspension)	Hala Legionów, Kielce; Attendance: 4,200; Referees: Horáček, Novotný (CZE)

29 November 2023; 18:45	Kolstad Håndball (Norway)	18–29	(Denmark) Aalborg Håndbold	Trondheim Spektrum, Trondheim; Attendance: 8,515; Referees: Pavićević, Ražnatović (MNE)
29 November 2023; 18:45	Sagosen 4	(9–14)	Hoxer Hangaard 6	Trondheim Spektrum, Trondheim; Attendance: 8,515; Referees: Pavićević, Ražnatović (MNE)
29 November 2023; 18:45	4× (suspension)	Report	3× (suspension)	Trondheim Spektrum, Trondheim; Attendance: 8,515; Referees: Pavićević, Ražnatović (MNE)

29 November 2023; 18:45	RK Zagreb (Croatia)	30–25	(Hungary) OTP Bank - Pick Szeged	Arena Zagreb, Zagreb; Attendance: 6,380; Referees: Nikolov, Nachevski (MKD)
29 November 2023; 18:45	Čupić, Srna 6	(17–12)	Mačkovšek 5	Arena Zagreb, Zagreb; Attendance: 6,380; Referees: Nikolov, Nachevski (MKD)
29 November 2023; 18:45	1× (yellow card) 2× (suspension)	Report	2× (yellow card) 5× (suspension)	Arena Zagreb, Zagreb; Attendance: 6,380; Referees: Nikolov, Nachevski (MKD)

30 November 2023; 18:45	THW Kiel (Germany)	26–24	(France) Paris Saint-Germain	Wunderino Arena, Kiel; Attendance: 8,204; Referees: Jørum, Kleven (NOR)
30 November 2023; 18:45	Ekberg 5	(15–10)	Grébille 6	Wunderino Arena, Kiel; Attendance: 8,204; Referees: Jørum, Kleven (NOR)
30 November 2023; 18:45	3× (suspension)	Report	1× (suspension)	Wunderino Arena, Kiel; Attendance: 8,204; Referees: Jørum, Kleven (NOR)

30 November 2023; 20:45	Industria Kielce (Poland)	35–25	(North Macedonia) RK Eurofarm Pelister	Hala Legionów, Kielce; Attendance: 4,000; Referees: Caçador, Nicolau (POR)
30 November 2023; 20:45	Þrastarson 7	(18–13)	Cehte 7	Hala Legionów, Kielce; Attendance: 4,000; Referees: Caçador, Nicolau (POR)
30 November 2023; 20:45	2× (suspension)	Report	1× (yellow card) 4× (suspension)	Hala Legionów, Kielce; Attendance: 4,000; Referees: Caçador, Nicolau (POR)

6 December 2023; 18:45	OTP Bank - Pick Szeged (Hungary)	26–25	(Poland) Industria Kielce	Pick Aréna, Szeged; Attendance: 4,506; Referees: Elíasson, Pálsson (ISL)
6 December 2023; 18:45	four players 4	(15–11)	A. Dujshebaev 6	Pick Aréna, Szeged; Attendance: 4,506; Referees: Elíasson, Pálsson (ISL)
6 December 2023; 18:45	2× (yellow card) 3× (suspension)	Report	1× (yellow card) 2× (suspension)	Pick Aréna, Szeged; Attendance: 4,506; Referees: Elíasson, Pálsson (ISL)

6 December 2023; 18:45	THW Kiel (Germany)	26–25	(Norway) Kolstad Håndball	Wunderino Arena, Kiel; Attendance: 6,811; Referees: Bonaventura, Bonaventura (FRA)
6 December 2023; 18:45	Ekberg 8	(15–12)	three players 5	Wunderino Arena, Kiel; Attendance: 6,811; Referees: Bonaventura, Bonaventura (FRA)
6 December 2023; 18:45	1× (yellow card) 3× (suspension)	Report	2× (yellow card) 7× (suspension) 1× (red card)	Wunderino Arena, Kiel; Attendance: 6,811; Referees: Bonaventura, Bonaventura (FRA)

7 December 2023; 18:45	Aalborg Håndbold (Denmark)	30–32	(France) Paris Saint-Germain	Gigantium, Aalborg; Attendance: 5,500; Referees: Bíró, Kiss (HUN)
7 December 2023; 18:45	Nilsson 10	(15–15)	Prandi 6	Gigantium, Aalborg; Attendance: 5,500; Referees: Bíró, Kiss (HUN)
7 December 2023; 18:45	3× (suspension)	Report	4× (suspension)	Gigantium, Aalborg; Attendance: 5,500; Referees: Bíró, Kiss (HUN)

7 December 2023; 18:45	RK Eurofarm Pelister (North Macedonia)	22–23	(Croatia) RK Zagreb	Boro Čurlevski Sports Hall, Bitola; Attendance: 3,000; Referees: Marín, García (ESP)
7 December 2023; 18:45	Kuzmanovski 8	(10–13)	Klarica 5	Boro Čurlevski Sports Hall, Bitola; Attendance: 3,000; Referees: Marín, García (ESP)
7 December 2023; 18:45	1× (yellow card) 6× (suspension)	Report	4× (suspension) 1× (red card)	Boro Čurlevski Sports Hall, Bitola; Attendance: 3,000; Referees: Marín, García (ESP)

14 February 2024; 18:45	RK Eurofarm Pelister (North Macedonia)	25–31	(France) Paris Saint-Germain	Boro Čurlevski Sports Hall, Bitola; Attendance: 3,000; Referees: Horáček, Novotný (CZE)
14 February 2024; 18:45	five players 3	(9–15)	Syprzak 7	Boro Čurlevski Sports Hall, Bitola; Attendance: 3,000; Referees: Horáček, Novotný (CZE)
14 February 2024; 18:45	1× (suspension)	Report	1× (suspension)	Boro Čurlevski Sports Hall, Bitola; Attendance: 3,000; Referees: Horáček, Novotný (CZE)

14 February 2024; 20:45	Industria Kielce (Poland)	36–36	(Germany) THW Kiel	Hala Legionów, Kielce; Attendance: 4,200; Referees: Boričić, Marković (SRB)
14 February 2024; 20:45	A. Dujshebaev, Tournat 7	(15–17)	Ekberg, Johansson 7	Hala Legionów, Kielce; Attendance: 4,200; Referees: Boričić, Marković (SRB)
14 February 2024; 20:45	3× (suspension)	Report	1× (yellow card) 6× (suspension)	Hala Legionów, Kielce; Attendance: 4,200; Referees: Boričić, Marković (SRB)

15 February 2024; 18:45	Aalborg Håndbold (Denmark)	32–22	(Croatia) RK Zagreb	Gigantium, Aalborg; Attendance: 5,475; Referees: Covalciuc, Covalciuc (MDA)
15 February 2024; 18:45	Hansen 6	(18–12)	Glavaš 5	Gigantium, Aalborg; Attendance: 5,475; Referees: Covalciuc, Covalciuc (MDA)
15 February 2024; 18:45	4× (suspension)	Report	4× (suspension)	Gigantium, Aalborg; Attendance: 5,475; Referees: Covalciuc, Covalciuc (MDA)

15 February 2024; 18:45	OTP Bank - Pick Szeged (Hungary)	29–27	(Norway) Kolstad Håndball	Pick Aréna, Szeged; Attendance: 4,491; Referees: Martins, Martins (POR)
15 February 2024; 18:45	Bánhidi 8	(15–13)	Guðjónsson 8	Pick Aréna, Szeged; Attendance: 4,491; Referees: Martins, Martins (POR)
15 February 2024; 18:45	4× (suspension)	Report	1× (yellow card) 2× (suspension)	Pick Aréna, Szeged; Attendance: 4,491; Referees: Martins, Martins (POR)

21 February 2024; 18:45	Aalborg Håndbold (Denmark)	31–26	(Hungary) OTP Bank - Pick Szeged	Gigantium, Aalborg; Attendance: 5,112; Referees: Brkic, Jusufhodzic (AUT)
21 February 2024; 18:45	Vlah 5	(14–16)	Šoštarič 7	Gigantium, Aalborg; Attendance: 5,112; Referees: Brkic, Jusufhodzic (AUT)
21 February 2024; 18:45	1× (yellow card) 4× (suspension)	Report	1× (yellow card) 3× (suspension)	Gigantium, Aalborg; Attendance: 5,112; Referees: Brkic, Jusufhodzic (AUT)

21 February 2024; 18:45	Kolstad Håndball (Norway)	25–34	(Croatia) RK Zagreb	Trondheim Spektrum, Trondheim; Attendance: 5,432; Referees: Álvarez, Bustamante (ESP)
21 February 2024; 18:45	Lyse 6	(10–18)	Morales, Kos 5	Trondheim Spektrum, Trondheim; Attendance: 5,432; Referees: Álvarez, Bustamante (ESP)
21 February 2024; 18:45	1× (yellow card) 4× (suspension)	Report	6× (suspension)	Trondheim Spektrum, Trondheim; Attendance: 5,432; Referees: Álvarez, Bustamante (ESP)

22 February 2024; 18:45	THW Kiel (Germany)	29–23	(North Macedonia) RK Eurofarm Pelister	Wunderino Arena, Kiel; Attendance: 6,428; Referees: Bíró, Kiss (HUN)
22 February 2024; 18:45	Ellefsen á Skipagøtu 8	(19–10)	Radivojević 6	Wunderino Arena, Kiel; Attendance: 6,428; Referees: Bíró, Kiss (HUN)
22 February 2024; 18:45	1× (suspension)	Report	4× (suspension)	Wunderino Arena, Kiel; Attendance: 6,428; Referees: Bíró, Kiss (HUN)

22 February 2024; 20:45	Paris Saint-Germain (France)	35–26	(Poland) Industria Kielce	Stade Pierre de Coubertin, Paris; Attendance: 3,336; Referees: Pavićević, Ražnatović (MNE)
22 February 2024; 20:45	three players 6	(15–14)	Sićko 7	Stade Pierre de Coubertin, Paris; Attendance: 3,336; Referees: Pavićević, Ražnatović (MNE)
22 February 2024; 20:45	3× (suspension)	Report	5× (suspension)	Stade Pierre de Coubertin, Paris; Attendance: 3,336; Referees: Pavićević, Ražnatović (MNE)

28 February 2024; 18:45	OTP Bank - Pick Szeged (Hungary)	27–28	(Germany) THW Kiel	Pick Aréna, Szeged; Attendance: 6,569; Referees: Kurtagic, Wetterwik (SWE)
28 February 2024; 18:45	Šoštarič 8	(14–16)	Johansson 8	Pick Aréna, Szeged; Attendance: 6,569; Referees: Kurtagic, Wetterwik (SWE)
28 February 2024; 18:45	1× (yellow card) 2× (suspension)	Report	1× (yellow card) 4× (suspension)	Pick Aréna, Szeged; Attendance: 6,569; Referees: Kurtagic, Wetterwik (SWE)

28 February 2024; 20:45	RK Eurofarm Pelister (North Macedonia)	28–33	(Denmark) Aalborg Håndbold	Boro Čurlevski Sports Hall, Bitola; Attendance: 2,870; Referees: Budzák, Záhradník (SVK)
28 February 2024; 20:45	Kuzmanovski 9	(14–17)	Arnoldsen, Bjørnsen 5	Boro Čurlevski Sports Hall, Bitola; Attendance: 2,870; Referees: Budzák, Záhradník (SVK)
28 February 2024; 20:45	1× (yellow card) 4× (suspension)	Report	2× (suspension)	Boro Čurlevski Sports Hall, Bitola; Attendance: 2,870; Referees: Budzák, Záhradník (SVK)

29 February 2024; 18:45	Industria Kielce (Poland)	31–23	(Norway) Kolstad Håndball	Hala Legionów, Kielce; Attendance: 4,200; Referees: Covalciuc, Covalciuc (MDA)
29 February 2024; 18:45	A. Dujshebaev 8	(13–10)	Lyse 6	Hala Legionów, Kielce; Attendance: 4,200; Referees: Covalciuc, Covalciuc (MDA)
29 February 2024; 18:45	3× (suspension)	Report	3× (suspension)	Hala Legionów, Kielce; Attendance: 4,200; Referees: Covalciuc, Covalciuc (MDA)

29 February 2024; 18:45	RK Zagreb (Croatia)	28–26	(France) Paris Saint-Germain	Arena Zagreb, Zagreb; Attendance: 12,260; Referees: Lah, Sok (SLO)
29 February 2024; 18:45	Klarica 10	(13–13)	Syprzak 6	Arena Zagreb, Zagreb; Attendance: 12,260; Referees: Lah, Sok (SLO)
29 February 2024; 18:45	2× (yellow card) 1× (suspension)	Report	3× (suspension)	Arena Zagreb, Zagreb; Attendance: 12,260; Referees: Lah, Sok (SLO)

6 March 2024; 18:45	THW Kiel (Germany)	33–22	(Croatia) RK Zagreb	Wunderino Arena, Kiel; Attendance: 9,021; Referees: Brunner, Salah (SUI)
6 March 2024; 18:45	Ekberg 9	(17–15)	three players 4	Wunderino Arena, Kiel; Attendance: 9,021; Referees: Brunner, Salah (SUI)
6 March 2024; 18:45	1× (yellow card) 1× (suspension)	Report	3× (suspension)	Wunderino Arena, Kiel; Attendance: 9,021; Referees: Brunner, Salah (SUI)

6 March 2024; 18:45	Kolstad Håndball (Norway)	34–27	(North Macedonia) RK Eurofarm Pelister	Trondheim Spektrum, Trondheim; Attendance: 4,008; Referees: Mažeika, Gatelis (LTU)
6 March 2024; 18:45	Lyse 11	(17–13)	Borzaš 11	Trondheim Spektrum, Trondheim; Attendance: 4,008; Referees: Mažeika, Gatelis (LTU)
6 March 2024; 18:45	1× (yellow card)	Report	1× (yellow card) 4× (suspension)	Trondheim Spektrum, Trondheim; Attendance: 4,008; Referees: Mažeika, Gatelis (LTU)

6 March 2024; 20:45	Paris Saint-Germain (France)	37–33	(Hungary) OTP Bank - Pick Szeged	Stade Pierre de Coubertin, Paris; Attendance: 3,136; Referees: Boričić, Marković (SRB)
6 March 2024; 20:45	Syprzak 10	(15–14)	Garciandia, Martins 8	Stade Pierre de Coubertin, Paris; Attendance: 3,136; Referees: Boričić, Marković (SRB)
6 March 2024; 20:45	6× (suspension)	Report	1× (yellow card) 5× (suspension) 1× (red card)	Stade Pierre de Coubertin, Paris; Attendance: 3,136; Referees: Boričić, Marković (SRB)

6 March 2024; 20:45	Aalborg Håndbold (Denmark)	35–35	(Poland) Industria Kielce	Gigantium, Aalborg; Attendance: 5,137; Referees: Lah, Sok (SLO)
6 March 2024; 20:45	Hoxer Hangaard 12	(15–18)	A. Dujshebaev 8	Gigantium, Aalborg; Attendance: 5,137; Referees: Lah, Sok (SLO)
6 March 2024; 20:45	2× (yellow card) 3× (suspension)	Report	4× (suspension) 1× (red card)	Gigantium, Aalborg; Attendance: 5,137; Referees: Lah, Sok (SLO)

=== Group B ===
Pos	Team	Pld	W	D	L	GF	GA	GD	Pts	Qualification
1	(Germany) SC Magdeburg	14	12	0	2	439	384	+55	24	Quarterfinals
2	(Spain) Barça	14	11	0	3	473	409	+64	22	Quarterfinals
3	(Hungary) Telekom Veszprém	14	10	0	4	489	436	+53	20	Playoffs
4	(France) Montpellier Handball	14	7	0	7	411	396	+15	14	Playoffs
5	(Denmark) GOG Håndbold	14	6	1	7	429	445	−16	13	Playoffs
6	(Poland) Orlen Wisła Płock	14	5	1	8	376	386	−10	11	Playoffs
7	(Portugal) FC Porto	14	4	0	10	409	480	−71	8	
8	(Slovenia) Celje Pivovarna Laško	14	0	0	14	400	490	−90	0	

Source: EHF
Rules for classification: Tiebreakers

13 September 2023; 20:45	GOG Håndbold (Denmark)	38–36	(Slovenia) Celje Pivovarna Laško	Arena Fyn, Odense; Attendance: 2,454; Referees: Konjičanin, Konjičanin (BIH)
13 September 2023; 20:45	Mensing 7	(18–19)	Žabić 8	Arena Fyn, Odense; Attendance: 2,454; Referees: Konjičanin, Konjičanin (BIH)
13 September 2023; 20:45	4× (suspension)	Report	7× (suspension)	Arena Fyn, Odense; Attendance: 2,454; Referees: Konjičanin, Konjičanin (BIH)

13 September 2023; 20:45	Montpellier Handball (France)	25–30	(Spain) Barça	Sud de France Arena, Montpellier; Attendance: 7,500; Referees: Mažeika, Gatelis (LTU)
13 September 2023; 20:45	Hesham 5	(11–16)	Mem 8	Sud de France Arena, Montpellier; Attendance: 7,500; Referees: Mažeika, Gatelis (LTU)
13 September 2023; 20:45	3× (suspension) 1× (red card)	Report	5× (suspension)	Sud de France Arena, Montpellier; Attendance: 7,500; Referees: Mažeika, Gatelis (LTU)

14 September 2023; 20:45	SC Magdeburg (Germany)	28–33	(Hungary) Telekom Veszprém	GETEC Arena, Magdeburg; Attendance: 4,224; Referees: Horáček, Novotný (CZE)
14 September 2023; 20:45	Damgaard 6	(18–21)	Fabregas 6	GETEC Arena, Magdeburg; Attendance: 4,224; Referees: Horáček, Novotný (CZE)
14 September 2023; 20:45	2× (suspension)	Report	3× (suspension)	GETEC Arena, Magdeburg; Attendance: 4,224; Referees: Horáček, Novotný (CZE)

14 September 2023; 20:45	FC Porto (Portugal)	24–23	(Poland) Orlen Wisła Płock	Dragão Arena, Porto; Attendance: 1,207; Referees: Boričić, Marković (SRB)
14 September 2023; 20:45	Læsø, Oliveira 5	(11–13)	Krajewski 8	Dragão Arena, Porto; Attendance: 1,207; Referees: Boričić, Marković (SRB)
14 September 2023; 20:45	1× (yellow card) 7× (suspension)	Report	1× (yellow card) 7× (suspension)	Dragão Arena, Porto; Attendance: 1,207; Referees: Boričić, Marković (SRB)

20 September 2023; 18:45	Orlen Wisła Płock (Poland)	26–30	(Denmark) GOG Håndbold	Orlen Arena, Płock; Attendance: 4,100; Referees: Bíró, Kiss (HUN)
20 September 2023; 18:45	Daszek, Fazekas 5	(13–13)	Olsen 10	Orlen Arena, Płock; Attendance: 4,100; Referees: Bíró, Kiss (HUN)
20 September 2023; 18:45	2× (suspension)	Report	4× (suspension)	Orlen Arena, Płock; Attendance: 4,100; Referees: Bíró, Kiss (HUN)

20 September 2023; 18:45	Celje Pivovarna Laško (Slovenia)	29–30	(Portugal) FC Porto	Zlatorog Arena, Celje; Attendance: 1,700; Referees: Jørum, Kleven (NOR)
20 September 2023; 18:45	Janc 9	(16–9)	Branquinho 6	Zlatorog Arena, Celje; Attendance: 1,700; Referees: Jørum, Kleven (NOR)
20 September 2023; 18:45	3× (suspension)	Report	2× (suspension)	Zlatorog Arena, Celje; Attendance: 1,700; Referees: Jørum, Kleven (NOR)

21 September 2023; 20:45	Telekom Veszprém (Hungary)	33–31	(France) Montpellier Handball	Veszprém Aréna, Veszprém; Attendance: 5,021; Referees: Madsen, Mortensen (DEN)
21 September 2023; 20:45	El-Deraa 7	(13–15)	Karlsson 6	Veszprém Aréna, Veszprém; Attendance: 5,021; Referees: Madsen, Mortensen (DEN)
21 September 2023; 20:45	2× (yellow card) 3× (suspension)	Report	1× (yellow card) 7× (suspension) 1× (red card)	Veszprém Aréna, Veszprém; Attendance: 5,021; Referees: Madsen, Mortensen (DEN)

21 September 2023; 20:45	Barça (Spain)	32–20	(Germany) SC Magdeburg	Palau Blaugrana, Barcelona; Attendance: 1,873; Referees: Hansen, Madsen (DEN)
21 September 2023; 20:45	Mem 8	(14–8)	Musche, Weber 3	Palau Blaugrana, Barcelona; Attendance: 1,873; Referees: Hansen, Madsen (DEN)
21 September 2023; 20:45	1× (yellow card) 2× (suspension)	Report	2× (suspension)	Palau Blaugrana, Barcelona; Attendance: 1,873; Referees: Hansen, Madsen (DEN)

27 September 2023; 20:45	SC Magdeburg (Germany)	39–23	(Slovenia) Celje Pivovarna Laško	GETEC Arena, Magdeburg; Attendance: 3,964; Referees: Brunner, Salah (SUI)
27 September 2023; 20:45	Magnússon 8	(20–13)	three players 4	GETEC Arena, Magdeburg; Attendance: 3,964; Referees: Brunner, Salah (SUI)
27 September 2023; 20:45	1× (yellow card) 3× (suspension)	Report	1× (yellow card) 6× (suspension) 1× (red card)	GETEC Arena, Magdeburg; Attendance: 3,964; Referees: Brunner, Salah (SUI)

28 September 2023; 18:45	GOG Håndbold (Denmark)	36–30	(Hungary) Telekom Veszprém	Arena Fyn, Odense; Attendance: 3,416; Referees: Covalciuc, Covalciuc (MDA)
28 September 2023; 18:45	Mensing 11	(18–14)	Remili 7	Arena Fyn, Odense; Attendance: 3,416; Referees: Covalciuc, Covalciuc (MDA)
28 September 2023; 18:45	4× (suspension)	Report	5× (suspension)	Arena Fyn, Odense; Attendance: 3,416; Referees: Covalciuc, Covalciuc (MDA)

28 September 2023; 18:45	FC Porto (Portugal)	30–38	(Spain) Barça	Dragão Arena, Porto; Attendance: 1,845; Referees: Bonaventura, Bonaventura (FRA)
28 September 2023; 18:45	three players 5	(15–19)	Frade 6	Dragão Arena, Porto; Attendance: 1,845; Referees: Bonaventura, Bonaventura (FRA)
28 September 2023; 18:45	3× (suspension)	Report	3× (suspension)	Dragão Arena, Porto; Attendance: 1,845; Referees: Bonaventura, Bonaventura (FRA)

28 September 2023; 20:45	Montpellier Handball (France)	30–28	(Poland) Orlen Wisła Płock	FDI Stadium, Montpellier; Attendance: 2,600; Referees: Horáček, Novotný (CZE)
28 September 2023; 20:45	Hesham 9	(14–15)	Mihić, Zarabec 6	FDI Stadium, Montpellier; Attendance: 2,600; Referees: Horáček, Novotný (CZE)
28 September 2023; 20:45	4× (suspension) 1× (red card)	Report	5× (suspension) 1× (red card)	FDI Stadium, Montpellier; Attendance: 2,600; Referees: Horáček, Novotný (CZE)

11 October 2023; 18:45	Telekom Veszprém (Hungary)	44–34	(Portugal) FC Porto	Veszprém Aréna, Veszprém; Attendance: 5,000; Referees: Elíasson, Pálsson (ISL)
11 October 2023; 18:45	Remili 10	(22–16)	Læsø 8	Veszprém Aréna, Veszprém; Attendance: 5,000; Referees: Elíasson, Pálsson (ISL)
11 October 2023; 18:45	1× (yellow card)	Report	1× (yellow card) 2× (suspension)	Veszprém Aréna, Veszprém; Attendance: 5,000; Referees: Elíasson, Pálsson (ISL)

11 October 2023; 18:45	Celje Pivovarna Laško (Slovenia)	29–31	(France) Montpellier Handball	Zlatorog Arena, Celje; Attendance: 1,350; Referees: Nikolov, Nachevski (MKD)
11 October 2023; 18:45	Cokan 9	(17–17)	Monte 10	Zlatorog Arena, Celje; Attendance: 1,350; Referees: Nikolov, Nachevski (MKD)
11 October 2023; 18:45	1× (yellow card) 3× (suspension)	Report	1× (yellow card) 4× (suspension)	Zlatorog Arena, Celje; Attendance: 1,350; Referees: Nikolov, Nachevski (MKD)

12 October 2023; 20:45	Barça (Spain)	38–30	(Denmark) GOG Håndbold	Palau Blaugrana, Barcelona; Attendance: 2,407; Referees: Pavićević, Ražnatović (MNE)
12 October 2023; 20:45	Mem 10	(20–11)	Wernsdorf Madsen 8	Palau Blaugrana, Barcelona; Attendance: 2,407; Referees: Pavićević, Ražnatović (MNE)
12 October 2023; 20:45	1× (suspension)	Report	2× (suspension)	Palau Blaugrana, Barcelona; Attendance: 2,407; Referees: Pavićević, Ražnatović (MNE)

12 October 2023; 20:45	Orlen Wisła Płock (Poland)	26–28	(Germany) SC Magdeburg	Orlen Arena, Płock; Attendance: 2,936; Referees: Gasmi, Gasmi (FRA)
12 October 2023; 20:45	Lučin 6	(12–14)	Claar 9	Orlen Arena, Płock; Attendance: 2,936; Referees: Gasmi, Gasmi (FRA)
12 October 2023; 20:45	5× (suspension) 1× (red card)	Report	6× (suspension)	Orlen Arena, Płock; Attendance: 2,936; Referees: Gasmi, Gasmi (FRA)

18 October 2023; 18:45	GOG Håndbold (Denmark)	32–27	(France) Montpellier Handball	Phønix Tag Arena, Gudme; Attendance: 1,746; Referees: Merz, Kuttler (GER)
18 October 2023; 18:45	Wernsdorf Madsen 8	(16–18)	four players 4	Phønix Tag Arena, Gudme; Attendance: 1,746; Referees: Merz, Kuttler (GER)
18 October 2023; 18:45	1× (yellow card) 3× (suspension)	Report	3× (suspension)	Phønix Tag Arena, Gudme; Attendance: 1,746; Referees: Merz, Kuttler (GER)

18 October 2023; 18:45	Celje Pivovarna Laško (Slovenia)	31–37	(Spain) Barça	Zlatorog Arena, Celje; Attendance: 3,890; Referees: Covalciuc, Covalciuc (MDA)
18 October 2023; 18:45	Mlakar 6	(17–22)	three players 5	Zlatorog Arena, Celje; Attendance: 3,890; Referees: Covalciuc, Covalciuc (MDA)
18 October 2023; 18:45	1× (yellow card) 2× (suspension) 1× (red card)	Report	2× (suspension)	Zlatorog Arena, Celje; Attendance: 3,890; Referees: Covalciuc, Covalciuc (MDA)

19 October 2023; 18:45	Telekom Veszprém (Hungary)	28–21	(Poland) Orlen Wisła Płock	Veszprém Aréna, Veszprém; Attendance: 5,019; Referees: Jørum, Kleven (NOR)
19 October 2023; 18:45	Marguč 6	(14–9)	Krajewski 6	Veszprém Aréna, Veszprém; Attendance: 5,019; Referees: Jørum, Kleven (NOR)
19 October 2023; 18:45	6× (suspension)	Report	1× (suspension)	Veszprém Aréna, Veszprém; Attendance: 5,019; Referees: Jørum, Kleven (NOR)

19 October 2023; 20:45	SC Magdeburg (Germany)	37–33	(Portugal) FC Porto	GETEC Arena, Magdeburg; Attendance: 5,274; Referees: Pavićević, Ražnatović (MNE)
19 October 2023; 20:45	Magnússon 9	(18–17)	Læsø 9	GETEC Arena, Magdeburg; Attendance: 5,274; Referees: Pavićević, Ražnatović (MNE)
19 October 2023; 20:45	1× (suspension)	Report	4× (suspension)	GETEC Arena, Magdeburg; Attendance: 5,274; Referees: Pavićević, Ražnatović (MNE)

25 October 2023; 20:45	Montpellier Handball (France)	25–28	(Germany) SC Magdeburg	FDI Stadium, Montpellier; Attendance: 3,000; Referees: Konjičanin, Konjičanin (BIH)
25 October 2023; 20:45	Karlsson 9	(14–12)	Musche 6	FDI Stadium, Montpellier; Attendance: 3,000; Referees: Konjičanin, Konjičanin (BIH)
25 October 2023; 20:45	2× (suspension) 1× (red card)	Report	1× (yellow card) 3× (suspension)	FDI Stadium, Montpellier; Attendance: 3,000; Referees: Konjičanin, Konjičanin (BIH)

26 October 2023; 20:45	Barça (Spain)	36–41	(Hungary) Telekom Veszprém	Palau Blaugrana, Barcelona; Attendance: 3,028; Referees: Nikolov, Nachevski (MKD)
26 October 2023; 20:45	Mem, N'Guessan 7	(17–19)	Fabregas, Pechmalbec 7	Palau Blaugrana, Barcelona; Attendance: 3,028; Referees: Nikolov, Nachevski (MKD)
26 October 2023; 20:45	1× (yellow card)	Report	2× (suspension)	Palau Blaugrana, Barcelona; Attendance: 3,028; Referees: Nikolov, Nachevski (MKD)

26 October 2023; 20:45	Orlen Wisła Płock (Poland)	30–25	(Slovenia) Celje Pivovarna Laško	Orlen Arena, Płock; Attendance: 3,011; Referees: Mažeika, Gatelis (LTU)
26 October 2023; 20:45	Dawydzik 8	(17–11)	Janc 8	Orlen Arena, Płock; Attendance: 3,011; Referees: Mažeika, Gatelis (LTU)
26 October 2023; 20:45	2× (suspension)	Report	2× (yellow card) 5× (suspension) 1× (red card)	Orlen Arena, Płock; Attendance: 3,011; Referees: Mažeika, Gatelis (LTU)

26 October 2023; 20:45	FC Porto (Portugal)	32–31	(Denmark) GOG Håndbold	Dragão Arena, Porto; Attendance: 1,021; Referees: Horváth, Marton (HUN)
26 October 2023; 20:45	Areia, Mikkelsen 5	(15–21)	Wernsdorf Madsen 6	Dragão Arena, Porto; Attendance: 1,021; Referees: Horváth, Marton (HUN)
26 October 2023; 20:45	1× (yellow card) 2× (suspension)	Report	2× (yellow card) 2× (suspension)	Dragão Arena, Porto; Attendance: 1,021; Referees: Horváth, Marton (HUN)

15 November 2023; 18:45	Celje Pivovarna Laško (Slovenia)	33–40	(Hungary) Telekom Veszprém	Zlatorog Arena, Celje; Attendance: 3,722; Referees: Pavićević, Ražnatović (MNE)
15 November 2023; 18:45	Cokan 7	(17–22)	Descat 8	Zlatorog Arena, Celje; Attendance: 3,722; Referees: Pavićević, Ražnatović (MNE)
15 November 2023; 18:45	4× (suspension)	Report	1× (suspension)	Zlatorog Arena, Celje; Attendance: 3,722; Referees: Pavićević, Ražnatović (MNE)

15 November 2023; 20:45	Montpellier Handball (France)	35–24	(Portugal) FC Porto	FDI Stadium, Montpellier; Attendance: 3,000; Referees: Schulze, Tönnies (GER)
15 November 2023; 20:45	Karlsson 10	(18–13)	Jiménez 4	FDI Stadium, Montpellier; Attendance: 3,000; Referees: Schulze, Tönnies (GER)
15 November 2023; 20:45	2× (suspension)	Report	3× (suspension)	FDI Stadium, Montpellier; Attendance: 3,000; Referees: Schulze, Tönnies (GER)

16 November 2023; 20:45	SC Magdeburg (Germany)	35–27	(Denmark) GOG Håndbold	GETEC Arena, Magdeburg; Attendance: 4,890; Referees: Lah, Sok (SLO)
16 November 2023; 20:45	Damgaard 7	(16–16)	Wernsdorf Madsen 8	GETEC Arena, Magdeburg; Attendance: 4,890; Referees: Lah, Sok (SLO)
16 November 2023; 20:45	1× (yellow card) 1× (suspension)	Report	1× (yellow card) 4× (suspension)	GETEC Arena, Magdeburg; Attendance: 4,890; Referees: Lah, Sok (SLO)

16 November 2023; 20:45	Orlen Wisła Płock (Poland)	25–28	(Spain) Barça	Orlen Arena, Płock; Attendance: 5,467; Referees: Merz, Kuttler (GER)
16 November 2023; 20:45	Lučin 8	(11–15)	Mem 6	Orlen Arena, Płock; Attendance: 5,467; Referees: Merz, Kuttler (GER)
16 November 2023; 20:45	1× (yellow card) 4× (suspension)	Report	1× (yellow card) 3× (suspension)	Orlen Arena, Płock; Attendance: 5,467; Referees: Merz, Kuttler (GER)

23 November 2023; 18:45	GOG Håndbold (Denmark)	25–32	(Germany) SC Magdeburg	Arena Fyn, Odense; Attendance: 4,000; Referees: Jørum, Kleven (NOR)
23 November 2023; 18:45	Wernsdorf Madsen, Olsen 5	(13–17)	Claar 7	Arena Fyn, Odense; Attendance: 4,000; Referees: Jørum, Kleven (NOR)
23 November 2023; 18:45	1× (yellow card) 1× (suspension)	Report	4× (suspension)	Arena Fyn, Odense; Attendance: 4,000; Referees: Jørum, Kleven (NOR)

23 November 2023; 18:45	Telekom Veszprém (Hungary)	41–31	(Slovenia) Celje Pivovarna Laško	Veszprém Aréna, Veszprém; Attendance: 4,950; Referees: Bonaventura, Bonaventura (FRA)
23 November 2023; 18:45	Marguč 6	(22–15)	Janc 10	Veszprém Aréna, Veszprém; Attendance: 4,950; Referees: Bonaventura, Bonaventura (FRA)
23 November 2023; 18:45	3× (suspension)	Report	1× (yellow card) 4× (suspension)	Veszprém Aréna, Veszprém; Attendance: 4,950; Referees: Bonaventura, Bonaventura (FRA)

23 November 2023; 20:45	Barça (Spain)	32–25	(Poland) Orlen Wisła Płock	Palau Blaugrana, Barcelona; Attendance: 1,520; Referees: Brunner, Salah (SUI)
23 November 2023; 20:45	Frade, Gómez 8	(16–13)	Krajewski 5	Palau Blaugrana, Barcelona; Attendance: 1,520; Referees: Brunner, Salah (SUI)
23 November 2023; 20:45	2× (suspension)	Report	1× (suspension)	Palau Blaugrana, Barcelona; Attendance: 1,520; Referees: Brunner, Salah (SUI)

23 November 2023; 20:45	FC Porto (Portugal)	25–29	(France) Montpellier Handball	Dragão Arena, Porto; Attendance: 1,149; Referees: Kurtagic, Wetterwik (SWE)
23 November 2023; 20:45	Magalhães 5	(13–13)	Pellas 9	Dragão Arena, Porto; Attendance: 1,149; Referees: Kurtagic, Wetterwik (SWE)
23 November 2023; 20:45	1× (suspension)	Report	1× (suspension)	Dragão Arena, Porto; Attendance: 1,149; Referees: Kurtagic, Wetterwik (SWE)

29 November 2023; 18:45	Celje Pivovarna Laško (Slovenia)	25–30	(Poland) Orlen Wisła Płock	Zlatorog Arena, Celje; Attendance: 2,500; Referees: Madsen, Mortensen (DEN)
29 November 2023; 18:45	Janc 8	(13–15)	Lučin 8	Zlatorog Arena, Celje; Attendance: 2,500; Referees: Madsen, Mortensen (DEN)
29 November 2023; 18:45	1× (yellow card) 5× (suspension) 1× (red card)	Report	1× (yellow card) 5× (suspension)	Zlatorog Arena, Celje; Attendance: 2,500; Referees: Madsen, Mortensen (DEN)

29 November 2023; 20:45	GOG Håndbold (Denmark)	35–27	(Portugal) FC Porto	Arena Fyn, Odense; Attendance: 3,233; Referees: Horáček, Novotný (CZE)
29 November 2023; 20:45	Mensing 8	(20–12)	Plaza Jiménez 6	Arena Fyn, Odense; Attendance: 3,233; Referees: Horáček, Novotný (CZE)
29 November 2023; 20:45	2× (suspension)	Report	2× (suspension)	Arena Fyn, Odense; Attendance: 3,233; Referees: Horáček, Novotný (CZE)

30 November 2023; 18:45	Telekom Veszprém (Hungary)	30–31	(Spain) Barça	Veszprém Aréna, Veszprém; Attendance: 5,300; Referees: Schulze, Tönnies (GER)
30 November 2023; 18:45	Remili 6	(15–17)	Gómez 8	Veszprém Aréna, Veszprém; Attendance: 5,300; Referees: Schulze, Tönnies (GER)
30 November 2023; 18:45	1× (suspension)	Report	3× (suspension)	Veszprém Aréna, Veszprém; Attendance: 5,300; Referees: Schulze, Tönnies (GER)

30 November 2023; 20:45	SC Magdeburg (Germany)	28–24	(France) Montpellier Handball	GETEC Arena, Magdeburg; Attendance: 4,993; Referees: Boričić, Marković (SRB)
30 November 2023; 20:45	Smárason 8	(14–11)	three players 4	GETEC Arena, Magdeburg; Attendance: 4,993; Referees: Boričić, Marković (SRB)
30 November 2023; 20:45	1× (yellow card) 2× (suspension)	Report	1× (yellow card) 3× (suspension)	GETEC Arena, Magdeburg; Attendance: 4,993; Referees: Boričić, Marković (SRB)

6 December 2023; 20:45	Montpellier Handball (France)	36–25	(Denmark) GOG Håndbold	FDI Stadium, Montpellier; Attendance: 2,700; Referees: Brunner, Salah (SUI)
6 December 2023; 20:45	Pellas 8	(16–13)	Madsen 11	FDI Stadium, Montpellier; Attendance: 2,700; Referees: Brunner, Salah (SUI)
6 December 2023; 20:45	1× (yellow card) 3× (suspension)	Report	1× (yellow card) 2× (suspension)	FDI Stadium, Montpellier; Attendance: 2,700; Referees: Brunner, Salah (SUI)

7 December 2023; 20:45	Barça (Spain)	39–30	(Slovenia) Celje Pivovarna Laško	Palau Blaugrana, Barcelona; Attendance: 2,837; Referees: Gasmi, Gasmi (FRA)
7 December 2023; 20:45	Richardson 8	(21–13)	Cokan 8	Palau Blaugrana, Barcelona; Attendance: 2,837; Referees: Gasmi, Gasmi (FRA)
7 December 2023; 20:45	1× (suspension)	Report	3× (suspension)	Palau Blaugrana, Barcelona; Attendance: 2,837; Referees: Gasmi, Gasmi (FRA)

7 December 2023; 20:45	Orlen Wisła Płock (Poland)	37–30	(Hungary) Telekom Veszprém	Orlen Arena, Płock; Attendance: 3,210; Referees: Kurtagic, Wetterwik (SWE)
7 December 2023; 20:45	Lučin 8	(18–11)	Descat 8	Orlen Arena, Płock; Attendance: 3,210; Referees: Kurtagic, Wetterwik (SWE)
7 December 2023; 20:45	4× (suspension)	Report	4× (suspension)	Orlen Arena, Płock; Attendance: 3,210; Referees: Kurtagic, Wetterwik (SWE)

7 December 2023; 20:45	FC Porto (Portugal)	31–40	(Germany) SC Magdeburg	Dragão Arena, Porto; Attendance: 1,065; Referees: Mažeika, Gatelis (LTU)
7 December 2023; 20:45	Martínez 7	(16–19)	Hornke, Magnússon 8	Dragão Arena, Porto; Attendance: 1,065; Referees: Mažeika, Gatelis (LTU)
7 December 2023; 20:45	1× (yellow card) 3× (suspension)	Report	3× (yellow card) 1× (suspension)	Dragão Arena, Porto; Attendance: 1,065; Referees: Mažeika, Gatelis (LTU)

14 February 2024; 18:45	GOG Håndbold (Denmark)	23–30	(Spain) Barça	Sydbank Arena, Kolding; Attendance: 4,236; Referees: Kurtagic, Wetterwik (SWE)
14 February 2024; 18:45	Madsen 6	(14–17)	Richardson 6	Sydbank Arena, Kolding; Attendance: 4,236; Referees: Kurtagic, Wetterwik (SWE)
14 February 2024; 18:45	1× (suspension)	Report	1× (yellow card) 1× (suspension)	Sydbank Arena, Kolding; Attendance: 4,236; Referees: Kurtagic, Wetterwik (SWE)

14 February 2024; 20:45	Montpellier Handball (France)	32–21	(Slovenia) Celje Pivovarna Laško	FDI Stadium, Montpellier; Attendance: 2,800; Referees: Merz, Kuttler (GER)
14 February 2024; 20:45	Porte 6	(17–12)	Janc 4	FDI Stadium, Montpellier; Attendance: 2,800; Referees: Merz, Kuttler (GER)
14 February 2024; 20:45	3× (suspension)	Report	5× (suspension)	FDI Stadium, Montpellier; Attendance: 2,800; Referees: Merz, Kuttler (GER)

15 February 2024; 20:45	SC Magdeburg (Germany)	28–22	(Poland) Orlen Wisła Płock	GETEC Arena, Magdeburg; Attendance: 6,060; Referees: Bonaventura, Bonaventura (FRA)
15 February 2024; 20:45	Hornke, Mertens 6	(13–14)	Lučin 8	GETEC Arena, Magdeburg; Attendance: 6,060; Referees: Bonaventura, Bonaventura (FRA)
15 February 2024; 20:45	1× (suspension)	Report	2× (yellow card) 5× (suspension) 1× (red card)	GETEC Arena, Magdeburg; Attendance: 6,060; Referees: Bonaventura, Bonaventura (FRA)

15 February 2024; 20:45	FC Porto (Portugal)	26–40	(Hungary) Telekom Veszprém	Dragão Arena, Porto; Attendance: 1,166; Referees: Gasmi, Gasmi (FRA)
15 February 2024; 20:45	Fernández Alonso 5	(11–21)	Omar 6	Dragão Arena, Porto; Attendance: 1,166; Referees: Gasmi, Gasmi (FRA)
15 February 2024; 20:45	1× (suspension)	Report	3× (suspension)	Dragão Arena, Porto; Attendance: 1,166; Referees: Gasmi, Gasmi (FRA)

21 February 2024; 18:45	Celje Pivovarna Laško (Slovenia)	27–37	(Germany) SC Magdeburg	Zlatorog Arena, Celje; Attendance: 3,123; Referees: Hansen, Madsen (DEN)
21 February 2024; 18:45	Cokan 8	(12–18)	Magnússon, Mertens 8	Zlatorog Arena, Celje; Attendance: 3,123; Referees: Hansen, Madsen (DEN)
21 February 2024; 18:45	2× (yellow card) 6× (suspension)	Report	1× (yellow card) 3× (suspension)	Zlatorog Arena, Celje; Attendance: 3,123; Referees: Hansen, Madsen (DEN)

21 February 2024; 20:45	Orlen Wisła Płock (Poland)	22–18	(France) Montpellier Handball	Orlen Arena, Płock; Attendance: 4,138; Referees: Marín, García (ESP)
21 February 2024; 20:45	Lučin 5	(10–10)	Fernández 4	Orlen Arena, Płock; Attendance: 4,138; Referees: Marín, García (ESP)
21 February 2024; 20:45	8× (suspension)	Report	1× (yellow card) 5× (suspension)	Orlen Arena, Płock; Attendance: 4,138; Referees: Marín, García (ESP)

22 February 2024; 18:45	Telekom Veszprém (Hungary)	34–31	(Denmark) GOG Håndbold	Veszprém Aréna, Veszprém; Attendance: 5,011; Referees: Mažeika, Gatelis (LTU)
22 February 2024; 18:45	Omar, Remili 6	(19–13)	Mensing 10	Veszprém Aréna, Veszprém; Attendance: 5,011; Referees: Mažeika, Gatelis (LTU)
22 February 2024; 18:45	1× (yellow card) 4× (suspension) 1× (red card)	Report	5× (suspension)	Veszprém Aréna, Veszprém; Attendance: 5,011; Referees: Mažeika, Gatelis (LTU)

22 February 2024; 20:45	Barça (Spain)	40–33	(Portugal) FC Porto	Palau Blaugrana, Barcelona; Attendance: 2,494; Referees: Erdoğan, Özdeniz (TUR)
22 February 2024; 20:45	Gómez 7	(20–15)	four players 4	Palau Blaugrana, Barcelona; Attendance: 2,494; Referees: Erdoğan, Özdeniz (TUR)
22 February 2024; 20:45	1× (suspension)	Report	2× (suspension)	Palau Blaugrana, Barcelona; Attendance: 2,494; Referees: Erdoğan, Özdeniz (TUR)

28 February 2024; 18:45	GOG Håndbold (Denmark)	32–32	(Poland) Orlen Wisła Płock	Arena Fyn, Odense; Attendance: 3,856; Referees: Schulze, Tönnies (GER)
28 February 2024; 18:45	Madsen 9	(17–14)	Lučin 11	Arena Fyn, Odense; Attendance: 3,856; Referees: Schulze, Tönnies (GER)
28 February 2024; 18:45	1× (yellow card) 4× (suspension)	Report	2× (suspension)	Arena Fyn, Odense; Attendance: 3,856; Referees: Schulze, Tönnies (GER)

28 February 2024; 20:45	FC Porto (Portugal)	32–30	(Slovenia) Celje Pivovarna Laško	Dragão Arena, Porto; Attendance: 1,010; Referees: Nikolov, Nachevski (MKD)
28 February 2024; 20:45	Areia 10	(14–11)	Milićević 9	Dragão Arena, Porto; Attendance: 1,010; Referees: Nikolov, Nachevski (MKD)
28 February 2024; 20:45	1× (yellow card)	Report	1× (yellow card) 3× (suspension)	Dragão Arena, Porto; Attendance: 1,010; Referees: Nikolov, Nachevski (MKD)

29 February 2024; 20:45	SC Magdeburg (Germany)	29–28	(Spain) Barça	GETEC Arena, Magdeburg; Attendance: 6,600; Referees: Jørum, Kleven (NOR)
29 February 2024; 20:45	Kristjánsson 6	(13–14)	Frade 8	GETEC Arena, Magdeburg; Attendance: 6,600; Referees: Jørum, Kleven (NOR)
29 February 2024; 20:45	1× (yellow card) 1× (suspension)	Report	1× (yellow card) 1× (suspension)	GETEC Arena, Magdeburg; Attendance: 6,600; Referees: Jørum, Kleven (NOR)

29 February 2024; 20:45	Montpellier Handball (France)	31–37	(Hungary) Telekom Veszprém	FDI Stadium, Montpellier; Attendance: 3,000; Referees: Elíasson, Pálsson (ISL)
29 February 2024; 20:45	Monte 5	(18–17)	Vailupau 8	FDI Stadium, Montpellier; Attendance: 3,000; Referees: Elíasson, Pálsson (ISL)
29 February 2024; 20:45	1× (yellow card) 1× (suspension)	Report	1× (yellow card) 3× (suspension)	FDI Stadium, Montpellier; Attendance: 3,000; Referees: Elíasson, Pálsson (ISL)

7 March 2024; 18:45	Telekom Veszprém (Hungary)	28–30	(Germany) SC Magdeburg	Veszprém Aréna, Veszprém; Attendance: 5,019; Referees: Martins, Martins (POR)
7 March 2024; 18:45	Fabregas 8	(14–14)	Claar 9	Veszprém Aréna, Veszprém; Attendance: 5,019; Referees: Martins, Martins (POR)
7 March 2024; 18:45	3× (suspension)	Report	1× (yellow card) 3× (suspension)	Veszprém Aréna, Veszprém; Attendance: 5,019; Referees: Martins, Martins (POR)

7 March 2024; 18:45	Celje Pivovarna Laško (Slovenia)	30–34	(Denmark) GOG Håndbold	Zlatorog Arena, Celje; Attendance: 1,784; Referees: Marín, García (ESP)
7 March 2024; 18:45	Janc 8	(15–15)	Mensing 10	Zlatorog Arena, Celje; Attendance: 1,784; Referees: Marín, García (ESP)
7 March 2024; 18:45	2× (suspension)	Report	2× (yellow card) 2× (suspension)	Zlatorog Arena, Celje; Attendance: 1,784; Referees: Marín, García (ESP)

7 March 2024; 20:45	Barça (Spain)	34–37	(France) Montpellier Handball	Palau Blaugrana, Barcelona; Attendance: 2,704; Referees: Konjičanin, Konjičanin (BIH)
7 March 2024; 20:45	Mem 9	(19–18)	Monte 11	Palau Blaugrana, Barcelona; Attendance: 2,704; Referees: Konjičanin, Konjičanin (BIH)
7 March 2024; 20:45	2× (suspension)	Report	6× (suspension)	Palau Blaugrana, Barcelona; Attendance: 2,704; Referees: Konjičanin, Konjičanin (BIH)

7 March 2024; 20:45	Orlen Wisła Płock (Poland)	29–28	(Portugal) FC Porto	Orlen Arena, Płock; Attendance: 4,098; Referees: Horváth, Marton (HUN)
7 March 2024; 20:45	four players 4	(14–15)	Læsø 7	Orlen Arena, Płock; Attendance: 4,098; Referees: Horváth, Marton (HUN)
7 March 2024; 20:45	2× (suspension)	Report	3× (suspension)	Orlen Arena, Płock; Attendance: 4,098; Referees: Horváth, Marton (HUN)
