= 2023–24 EHF Champions League knockout stage =

Handball tournament

The 2023–24 EHF Champions League knockout stage began on 27 March with the playoffs and ended on 9 June 2024 with the final at the Lanxess Arena in Cologne, Germany, to decide the winners of the 2023–24 EHF Champions League. A total of twelve teams competed in the knockout phase.

== Format ==
In the playoffs, the eight teams ranked 3rd–6th in Groups A and B played against each other in two-legged home-and-away matches. The four winning teams advanced to the quarterfinals, where they were joined by the top-two teams of Groups A and B for another round of two-legged home-and-away matches. The four quarterfinal winners qualified for the final four tournament at the Lanxess Arena in Cologne, Germany.

== Qualified teams ==
The top six teams from Groups A and B qualified for the knockout stage.

Group	Qualified for quarterfinals		Qualified for playoffs			
Group	First place	Second place	Third place	Fourth place	Fifth place	Sixth place
A	(Germany) THW Kiel	(Denmark) Aalborg Håndbold	(France) Paris Saint-Germain	(Poland) Industria Kielce	(Croatia) RK Zagreb	(Hungary) OTP Bank - Pick Szeged
B	(Germany) SC Magdeburg	(Spain) Barça	(Hungary) Telekom Veszprém	(France) Montpellier Handball	(Denmark) GOG Håndbold	(Poland) Orlen Wisła Płock

== Playoffs ==
=== Overview ===
Team 1	Agg.	Team 2	1st leg	2nd leg
Orlen Wisła Płock (Poland)	59–64	(France) Paris Saint-Germain	26–30	33–34
OTP Bank - Pick Szeged (Hungary)	62–76	(Hungary) Telekom Veszprém	30–37	32–39
GOG Håndbold (Denmark)	53–66	(Poland) Industria Kielce	25–33	28–33
RK Zagreb (Croatia)	51–57	(France) Montpellier Handball	27–27	24–30

==== Matches ====
28 March 2024; 20:45	Orlen Wisła Płock (Poland)	26–30	(France) Paris Saint-Germain	Orlen Arena, Płock; Attendance: 5,012; Referees: Mažeika, Gatelis (LTU)
28 March 2024; 20:45	Krajewski, Zarabec 4	(12–13)	Prandi, Syprzak 8	Orlen Arena, Płock; Attendance: 5,012; Referees: Mažeika, Gatelis (LTU)
28 March 2024; 20:45	2× (suspension) 1× (red card)	Report	2× (suspension)	Orlen Arena, Płock; Attendance: 5,012; Referees: Mažeika, Gatelis (LTU)

4 April 2024; 20:45	Paris Saint-Germain (France)	34–33	(Poland) Orlen Wisła Płock	Stade Pierre de Coubertin, Paris; Attendance: 3,011; Referees: Elíasson, Pálsson (ISL)
4 April 2024; 20:45	Prandi 9	(18–15)	Krajewski 8	Stade Pierre de Coubertin, Paris; Attendance: 3,011; Referees: Elíasson, Pálsson (ISL)
4 April 2024; 20:45	1× (yellow card) 6× (suspension)	Report	1× (yellow card) 5× (suspension)	Stade Pierre de Coubertin, Paris; Attendance: 3,011; Referees: Elíasson, Pálsson (ISL)

Paris Saint-Germain won 64–59 on aggregate.

28 March 2024; 18:45	OTP Bank - Pick Szeged (Hungary)	30–37	(Hungary) Telekom Veszprém	Pick Aréna, Szeged; Attendance: 7,749; Referees: Hansen, Madsen (DEN)
28 March 2024; 18:45	Frimmel 6	(17–20)	Descat, Vailupau 7	Pick Aréna, Szeged; Attendance: 7,749; Referees: Hansen, Madsen (DEN)
28 March 2024; 18:45	1× (yellow card) 2× (suspension)	Report	1× (yellow card) 3× (suspension)	Pick Aréna, Szeged; Attendance: 7,749; Referees: Hansen, Madsen (DEN)

4 April 2024; 18:45	Telekom Veszprém (Hungary)	39–32	(Hungary) OTP Bank - Pick Szeged	Veszprém Aréna, Veszprém; Attendance: 5,057; Referees: Marín, García (ESP)
4 April 2024; 18:45	Vailupau 8	(19–15)	Martins 8	Veszprém Aréna, Veszprém; Attendance: 5,057; Referees: Marín, García (ESP)
4 April 2024; 18:45	1× (yellow card) 1× (suspension)	Report	1× (yellow card) 2× (suspension)	Veszprém Aréna, Veszprém; Attendance: 5,057; Referees: Marín, García (ESP)

Telekom Veszprém won 76–62 on aggregate.

27 March 2024; 18:45	GOG Håndbold (Denmark)	25–33	(Poland) Industria Kielce	Arena Fyn, Odense; Attendance: 3,128; Referees: Bonaventura, Bonaventura (FRA)
27 March 2024; 18:45	Madsen, Zachariassen 4	(10–18)	A. Dujshebaev 9	Arena Fyn, Odense; Attendance: 3,128; Referees: Bonaventura, Bonaventura (FRA)
27 March 2024; 18:45	1× (suspension)	Report	1× (yellow card) 5× (suspension)	Arena Fyn, Odense; Attendance: 3,128; Referees: Bonaventura, Bonaventura (FRA)

3 April 2024; 18:45	Industria Kielce (Poland)	33–28	(Denmark) GOG Håndbold	Hala Legionów, Kielce; Attendance: 4,200; Referees: Martins, Martins (POR)
3 April 2024; 18:45	A. Dujshebaev 7	(16–12)	Mensing 6	Hala Legionów, Kielce; Attendance: 4,200; Referees: Martins, Martins (POR)
3 April 2024; 18:45	3× (suspension)	Report	4× (suspension)	Hala Legionów, Kielce; Attendance: 4,200; Referees: Martins, Martins (POR)

Industria Kielce won 66–53 on aggregate.

27 March 2024; 20:45	RK Zagreb (Croatia)	27–27	(France) Montpellier Handball	Arena Zagreb, Zagreb; Attendance: 15,200; Referees: Schulze, Tönnies (GER)
27 March 2024; 20:45	Srna 6	(11–13)	Simonet, Skube 6	Arena Zagreb, Zagreb; Attendance: 15,200; Referees: Schulze, Tönnies (GER)
27 March 2024; 20:45	2× (yellow card) 3× (suspension)	Report	1× (yellow card) 8× (suspension) 1× (red card)	Arena Zagreb, Zagreb; Attendance: 15,200; Referees: Schulze, Tönnies (GER)

3 April 2024; 20:45	Montpellier Handball (France)	30–24	(Croatia) RK Zagreb	FDI Stadium, Montpellier; Attendance: 3,000; Referees: Horáček, Novotný (CZE)
3 April 2024; 20:45	Skube 6	(14–14)	Čupić, Faljić 4	FDI Stadium, Montpellier; Attendance: 3,000; Referees: Horáček, Novotný (CZE)
3 April 2024; 20:45	2× (suspension)	Report	1× (yellow card) 2× (suspension)	FDI Stadium, Montpellier; Attendance: 3,000; Referees: Horáček, Novotný (CZE)

Montpellier Handball won 57–51 on aggregate.

== Quarterfinals ==
=== Overview ===
Team 1	Agg.	Team 2	1st leg	2nd leg
Montpellier Handball (France)	60–61	(Germany) THW Kiel	39–30	21–31
Industria Kielce (Poland)	49–49; 3–4 (p)	(Germany) SC Magdeburg	27–26	22–23
Telekom Veszprém (Hungary)	60–64	(Denmark) Aalborg Håndbold	32–31	28–33
Paris Saint-Germain (France)	53–62	(Spain) Barça	22–30	31–32

==== Matches ====
24 April 2024; 20:45	Montpellier Handball (France)	39–30	(Germany) THW Kiel	FDI Stadium, Montpellier; Attendance: 3,000; Referees: Lah, Sok (SLO)
24 April 2024; 20:45	Lenne, Pellas 7	(20–16)	Johansson 8	FDI Stadium, Montpellier; Attendance: 3,000; Referees: Lah, Sok (SLO)
24 April 2024; 20:45	1× (yellow card) 3× (suspension) 1× (red card)	Report	1× (yellow card) 5× (suspension)	FDI Stadium, Montpellier; Attendance: 3,000; Referees: Lah, Sok (SLO)

2 May 2024; 18:45	THW Kiel (Germany)	31–21	(France) Montpellier Handball	Wunderino Arena, Kiel; Attendance: 8,513; Referees: Jørum, Kleven (NOR)
2 May 2024; 18:45	Johansson 8	(17–12)	Pellas 6	Wunderino Arena, Kiel; Attendance: 8,513; Referees: Jørum, Kleven (NOR)
2 May 2024; 18:45	1× (yellow card) 4× (suspension) 1× (red card)	Report	7× (suspension)	Wunderino Arena, Kiel; Attendance: 8,513; Referees: Jørum, Kleven (NOR)

THW Kiel won 61–60 on aggregate.

24 April 2024; 18:45	Industria Kielce (Poland)	27–26	(Germany) SC Magdeburg	Hala Legionów, Kielce; Attendance: 4,200; Referees: Nikolov, Nachevski (MKD)
24 April 2024; 18:45	A. Dujshebaev 8	(14–13)	Claar 8	Hala Legionów, Kielce; Attendance: 4,200; Referees: Nikolov, Nachevski (MKD)
24 April 2024; 18:45	2× (suspension) 1× (red card)	Report	1× (yellow card)	Hala Legionów, Kielce; Attendance: 4,200; Referees: Nikolov, Nachevski (MKD)

1 May 2024
20:45
SC Magdeburg (Germany)
27–25
(Poland) Industria Kielce
GETEC Arena, Magdeburg
Attendance: 6,600
Referees: Kurtagic, Wetterwik (SWE)
Magnússon 8
(11–13)
A. Dujshebaev, D. Dujshebaev 4
2× (yellow card) 4× (suspension)
Report
1× (yellow card) 3× (suspension)

FT: 23–22 Pen: 4–3

SC Magdeburg won 53–52 on aggregate.

25 April 2024; 18:45	Telekom Veszprém (Hungary)	32–31	(Denmark) Aalborg Håndbold	Veszprém Aréna, Veszprém; Attendance: 5,250; Referees: Covalciuc, Covalciuc (MDA)
25 April 2024; 18:45	Remili 6	(12–17)	four players 4	Veszprém Aréna, Veszprém; Attendance: 5,250; Referees: Covalciuc, Covalciuc (MDA)
25 April 2024; 18:45	4× (suspension)	Report	2× (suspension)	Veszprém Aréna, Veszprém; Attendance: 5,250; Referees: Covalciuc, Covalciuc (MDA)

1 May 2024; 18:45	Aalborg Håndbold (Denmark)	33–28	(Hungary) Telekom Veszprém	Gigantium, Aalborg; Attendance: 5,500; Referees: Boričić, Marković (SRB)
1 May 2024; 18:45	Hoxer Hangaard 9	(18–14)	Vailupau 6	Gigantium, Aalborg; Attendance: 5,500; Referees: Boričić, Marković (SRB)
1 May 2024; 18:45	1× (yellow card) 4× (suspension)	Report	2× (yellow card) 5× (suspension)	Gigantium, Aalborg; Attendance: 5,500; Referees: Boričić, Marković (SRB)

Aalborg Håndbold won 64–60 on aggregate.

25 April 2024; 20:45	Paris Saint-Germain (France)	22–30	(Spain) Barça	Stade Pierre de Coubertin, Paris; Attendance: 3,339; Referees: Schulze, Tönnies (GER)
25 April 2024; 20:45	Syprzak 7	(14–11)	Mem 7	Stade Pierre de Coubertin, Paris; Attendance: 3,339; Referees: Schulze, Tönnies (GER)
25 April 2024; 20:45	4× (suspension)	Report	2× (suspension)	Stade Pierre de Coubertin, Paris; Attendance: 3,339; Referees: Schulze, Tönnies (GER)

2 May 2024; 20:45	Barça (Spain)	32–31	(France) Paris Saint-Germain	Palau Blaugrana, Barcelona; Attendance: 5,500; Referees: Pavićević, Ražnatović (MNE)
2 May 2024; 20:45	Mem 7	(17–12)	Prandi 10	Palau Blaugrana, Barcelona; Attendance: 5,500; Referees: Pavićević, Ražnatović (MNE)
2 May 2024; 20:45	3× (suspension)	Report	6× (suspension) 2× (red card)	Palau Blaugrana, Barcelona; Attendance: 5,500; Referees: Pavićević, Ražnatović (MNE)

Barça won 62–53 on aggregate.

== Final four ==
The final four was held at the Lanxess Arena in Cologne, Germany on 8 and 9 June 2024. The draw was held on 7 May 2024.

=== Bracket ===
Semi-finals
8 June
(Germany) SC Magdeburg	26
(Denmark) Aalborg Håndbold	28
8 June
(Spain) Barça	30
(Germany) THW Kiel	18

Final
9 June
(Denmark) Aalborg Håndbold	30
(Spain) Barça	31
Third place
9 June
(Germany) SC Magdeburg	28
(Germany) THW Kiel	32

=== Semifinals ===
8 June 2024; 15:00	SC Magdeburg (Germany)	26–28	(Denmark) Aalborg Håndbold	Lanxess Arena, Cologne; Attendance: 19,750; Referees: Bonaventura, Bonaventura (FRA)
8 June 2024; 15:00	Magnússon 10	(11–11)	Hoxer Hangaard 8	Lanxess Arena, Cologne; Attendance: 19,750; Referees: Bonaventura, Bonaventura (FRA)
8 June 2024; 15:00	1× (suspension) 1× (red card)	Report	2× (suspension)	Lanxess Arena, Cologne; Attendance: 19,750; Referees: Bonaventura, Bonaventura (FRA)

8 June 2024; 18:00	Barça (Spain)	30–18	(Germany) THW Kiel	Lanxess Arena, Cologne; Attendance: 19,750; Referees: Martins, Martins (POR)
8 June 2024; 18:00	Richardson 5	(15–9)	Duvnjak 4	Lanxess Arena, Cologne; Attendance: 19,750; Referees: Martins, Martins (POR)
8 June 2024; 18:00	2× (suspension)	Report	2× (suspension)	Lanxess Arena, Cologne; Attendance: 19,750; Referees: Martins, Martins (POR)

=== Third place game ===
9 June 2024; 15:00	SC Magdeburg (Germany)	28–32	(Germany) THW Kiel	Lanxess Arena, Cologne; Attendance: 19,750; Referees: Bíró, Kiss (HUN)
9 June 2024; 15:00	Mertens 7	(14–23)	Johansson 7	Lanxess Arena, Cologne; Attendance: 19,750; Referees: Bíró, Kiss (HUN)
9 June 2024; 15:00	1× (yellow card) 3× (suspension) 1× (red card)	Report	1× (yellow card) 8× (suspension)	Lanxess Arena, Cologne; Attendance: 19,750; Referees: Bíró, Kiss (HUN)

=== Final ===
9 June 2024; 18:00	Aalborg Håndbold (Denmark)	30–31	(Spain) Barça	Lanxess Arena, Cologne; Attendance: 19,750; Referees: Nikolov, Nachevski (MKD)
9 June 2024; 18:00	Hansen 8	(15–15)	Richardson 8	Lanxess Arena, Cologne; Attendance: 19,750; Referees: Nikolov, Nachevski (MKD)
9 June 2024; 18:00	2× (yellow card) 3× (suspension)	Report	3× (suspension)	Lanxess Arena, Cologne; Attendance: 19,750; Referees: Nikolov, Nachevski (MKD)
