= 2023–24 EHF Champions League =

64th edition of Europe's premier club handball tournament

EHF Champions League
- 2023–24

Tournament information
- Sport: Handball
- Location: Lanxess Arena (FINAL4)
- Dates: 13 September 2023–9 June 2024
- Teams: 16
- Website: ehfcl.com

Final positions
- Champions: (Spain) Barça
- Runner-up: (Denmark) Aalborg Håndbold

Tournament statistics
- Matches played: 130
- Goals scored: 7652 (58.86 per match)
- Attendance: 658,456 (5,065 per match)
- MVP: (France) Melvyn Richardson
- Top scorer(s): (Poland) Kamil Syprzak (112 goals)

The 2023–24 EHF Champions League was the 64th edition of Europe's premier club handball tournament, running from 13 September 2023 to 9 June 2024.

SC Magdeburg were the reigning champions but lost in the semifinals. Barça defeated Aalborg Håndbold in the final to win their 12th title.

== Format ==
The tournament used the same format as the previous three seasons. The competition began with a group stage featuring sixteen teams divided into two groups. Matches were played in a double round-robin system with home-and-away fixtures, fourteen in total for each team. In Groups A and B, the top two teams automatically qualified for the quarter-finals, with teams ranked 3rd to 6th entering the playoff round.

The knockout stage included four rounds: the playoffs, quarter-finals, and a final-four tournament comprising two semifinals and the final. In the playoffs, eight teams were paired against each other in two-legged home-and-away matches (third-placed in group A played sixth-placed group B; fourth-placed group A plays fifth-placed group B, etc.). The four aggregate winners of the playoffs advanced to the quarterfinals, joining the top-two teams of Groups A and B. The eight quarterfinalist teams were paired against each other in two-legged home-and-away matches, with the four aggregate winners qualifying to the final-four tournament.

In the final four tournament, the semifinals and the final were played as single matches at a pre-selected host venue.

== Rankings ==
This season, the EHF decided to make separate rankings for each club competition.

- Associations 1–9 had their league champion qualify for the group stage and apply for a wildcards.
- The Association that won the past season's EHF European League had their league champion and runner up qualify for the group stage but cannot apply for a wildcard.
- Associations below the top 9 had their league champion apply for a wildcard.

Rank	Association	Average points	Teams
1	Spain	230.00	1
2	Germany	170.33	2
3	France	134.33	2
4	Hungary	132.67	2
5	Denmark	131.67	2
6	Poland	124.33	2
7	Portugal	82.00	1
8	North Macedonia	80.00	1
9	Slovenia	78.00	1
10	Romania	66.50	0

Rank	Association	Average points	Teams
11	Belarus	57.67	0
12	Norway	57.00	1
13	Ukraine	48.00	0
14	Croatia	43.00	1
15	Sweden	38.00	0
16	Russia	34.00	0
17	Slovakia	33.00	0
18	Finland	32.00	0
18	Switzerland	32.00	0
20	Everyone else	0.00	0

== Teams ==
20 teams applied for a place, with ten having a fixed place. The final list was announced on June 20, 2023.

The fixed place for Russia was vacant since the country and its clubs were not admitted to participate in the EHF competitions due to the Russian invasion of Ukraine.

Participating teams
(Denmark) GOG Håndbold (1st)	(France) Paris Saint-Germain (1st)	(Spain) Barcelona (1st)	(Germany) THW Kiel (1st)
(Germany) SC Magdeburg (2nd)	(Hungary) Telekom Veszprém (1st)	(North Macedonia) RK Eurofarm Pelister (1st)	(Poland) Industria Kielce (1st)
(Portugal) FC Porto (1st)	(Slovenia) Celje Pivovarna Laško (1st)	(Croatia) RK Zagreb (1st) ^{WC}	(Denmark) Aalborg Håndbold (1st (Note: Regular season winner while final runner-up losing to GOG Håndbold)) ^{WC}
(France) Montpellier Handball (2nd) ^{WC}	(Hungary) OTP Bank - Pick Szeged (2nd) ^{WC}	(Norway) Kolstad Håndball (1st) ^{WC}	(Poland) Orlen Wisła Płock (2nd) ^{WC}

- ^{WC} Accepted wildcards

Wildcard rejection
(Portugal) Sporting CP (2nd)	(Romania) Dinamo București (1st)	(Switzerland) Kadetten Schaffhausen (1st)	(Sweden) IFK Kristianstad (1st)

== Draw ==
The draw took place on 27 June 2023.

== Group stage ==
Location of teams of the 2023–24 EHF Champions League group stage.
Red: Group A; Blue: Group B.

The 16 teams were drawn into two groups of eight. Teams from the same national association could not be drawn into the same group.

In the group stage, teams were ranked according to points (2 points for a win, 1 point for a draw, 0 points for a loss). After completion of the group stage, if two or more teams have scored the same number of points, the ranking will be determined as follows:

1. Highest number of points in matches between the teams directly involved;
2. Superior goal difference in matches between the teams directly involved;
3. Highest number of goals scored in matches between the teams directly involved;
4. Superior goal difference in all matches of the group;
5. Highest number of plus goals in all matches of the group;
6. Drawing of Lots

A total of 11 national associations will be represented in the group stage. North Macedonia are the only returnees, after Vardar 1961 was disqualified last season. Kolstad Håndball are the only debutants.

=== Group A ===
Pos	Team	Pld	W	D	L	GF	GA	GD	Pts	Qualification	THW	AAL	PAR	KIE	ZAG	SZE	KOL	PEL
1	(Germany) THW Kiel	14	10	2	2	410	379	+31	22	Quarterfinals	—	18–27	26–24	35–31	33–22	35–32	26–25	29–23
2	(Denmark) Aalborg Håndbold	14	8	3	3	430	382	+48	19	Quarterfinals	27–27	—	30–32	35–35	32–22	31–26	27–25	38–23
3	(France) Paris Saint-Germain	14	8	1	5	431	412	+19	17	Playoffs	28–34	33–30	—	35–26	35–31	37–33	28–28	31–26
4	(Poland) Industria Kielce	14	6	4	4	413	402	+11	16	Playoffs	36–36	31–34	30–29	—	28–24	27–27	31–23	35–25
5	(Croatia) RK Zagreb	14	6	2	6	373	373	0	14	Playoffs	23–30	30–30	28–26	22–22	—	30–25	31–20	27–18
6	(Hungary) OTP Bank - Pick Szeged	14	6	1	7	401	414	−13	13	Playoffs	27–28	34–27	29–31	26–25	27–26	—	29–27	34–26
7	(Norway) Kolstad Håndball	14	5	1	8	393	401	−8	11		34–30	18–29	36–31	30–34	25–34	37–24	—	34–27
8	(North Macedonia) RK Eurofarm Pelister	14	0	0	14	333	421	−88	0		20–23	28–33	25–31	21–24	22–23	27–28	22–31	—

Source: EHF
Rules for classification: Tiebreakers

=== Group B ===
Pos	Team	Pld	W	D	L	GF	GA	GD	Pts	Qualification	MAG	BAR	VES	MON	GOG	PLO	POR	CEL
1	(Germany) SC Magdeburg	14	12	0	2	439	384	+55	24	Quarterfinals	—	29–28	28–33	28–24	35–27	28–22	37–33	39–23
2	(Spain) Barça	14	11	0	3	473	409	+64	22	Quarterfinals	32–20	—	36–41	34–37	38–30	32–25	40–33	39–30
3	(Hungary) Telekom Veszprém	14	10	0	4	489	436	+53	20	Playoffs	28–30	30–31	—	33–31	34–31	28–21	44–34	41–31
4	(France) Montpellier Handball	14	7	0	7	411	396	+15	14	Playoffs	25–28	25–30	31–37	—	36–25	30–28	35–24	32–21
5	(Denmark) GOG Håndbold	14	6	1	7	429	445	−16	13	Playoffs	25–32	23–30	36–30	32–27	—	32–32	35–27	38–36
6	(Poland) Orlen Wisła Płock	14	5	1	8	376	386	−10	11	Playoffs	26–28	25–28	37–30	22–18	26–30	—	29–28	30–25
7	(Portugal) FC Porto	14	4	0	10	409	480	−71	8		31–40	30–38	26–40	25–29	32–31	24–23	—	32–30
8	(Slovenia) Celje Pivovarna Laško	14	0	0	14	400	490	−90	0		27–37	31–37	33–40	29–31	30–34	25–30	29–30	—

Source: EHF
Rules for classification: Tiebreakers

== Knockout stage ==
=== Playoffs ===
Team 1	Agg.	Team 2	1st leg	2nd leg
Orlen Wisła Płock (Poland)	59–64	(France) Paris Saint-Germain	26–30	33–34
OTP Bank - Pick Szeged (Hungary)	62–76	(Hungary) Telekom Veszprém	30–37	32–39
GOG Håndbold (Denmark)	53–66	(Poland) Industria Kielce	25–33	28–33
RK Zagreb (Croatia)	51–57	(France) Montpellier Handball	27–27	24–30

=== Quarterfinals ===
Team 1	Agg.	Team 2	1st leg	2nd leg
Montpellier Handball (France)	60–61	(Germany) THW Kiel	39–30	21–31
Industria Kielce (Poland)	49–49; 3–4 (p)	(Germany) SC Magdeburg	27–26	22–23
Telekom Veszprém (Hungary)	60–64	(Denmark) Aalborg Håndbold	32–31	28–33
Paris Saint-Germain (France)	53–62	(Spain) Barça	22–30	31–32

=== Final four ===
The final four was held at the Lanxess Arena in Cologne, Germany on 8 and 9 June 2024.

==== Bracket ====
Semi-finals
8 June
(Germany) SC Magdeburg	26
(Denmark) Aalborg Håndbold	28
8 June
(Spain) Barça	30
(Germany) THW Kiel	18

Final
9 June
(Denmark) Aalborg Håndbold	30
(Spain) Barça	31
Third place
9 June
(Germany) SC Magdeburg	28
(Germany) THW Kiel	32

==== Final ====
9 June 2024; 18:00	Aalborg Håndbold (Denmark)	30–31	(Spain) Barça	Lanxess Arena, Cologne; Attendance: 19,750; Referees: Nikolov, Nachevski (MKD)
9 June 2024; 18:00	Hansen 8	(15–15)	Richardson 8	Lanxess Arena, Cologne; Attendance: 19,750; Referees: Nikolov, Nachevski (MKD)
9 June 2024; 18:00	2× (yellow card) 3× (suspension)	Report	3× (suspension)	Lanxess Arena, Cologne; Attendance: 19,750; Referees: Nikolov, Nachevski (MKD)

== Top goalscorers ==
Rank	Player	Club	Goals
1	(Poland) Kamil Syprzak	(France) Paris Saint-Germain	112
2	(France) Dika Mem	(Spain) Barça	106
3	(Denmark) Emil Wernsdorf Madsen	(Denmark) GOG Håndbold	98
3	(Iceland) Ómar Ingi Magnússon	(Germany) SC Magdeburg	98
5	(Denmark) Mads Hoxer Hangaard	(Denmark) Aalborg Håndbold	96
6	(Denmark) Aaron Mensing	(Denmark) GOG Håndbold	93
7	(Sweden) Niclas Ekberg	(Germany) THW Kiel	92
8	(Croatia) Mario Šoštarič	(Hungary) OTP Bank - Pick Szeged	88
9	(Slovenia) Mitja Janc	(Slovenia) Celje Pivovarna Laško	87
9	(France) Elohim Prandi	(France) Paris Saint-Germain	87

== See also ==
- 2023–24 EHF European League
- 2023–24 EHF European Cup
- 2023–24 Women's EHF Champions League
- 2023–24 Women's EHF European League
- 2023–24 Women's EHF European Cup
