= 2022–23 Superliga (men's handball) =

Polish Superliga
- Season: 2022–23
- Dates: 2 September 2022 – 21 May 2023
- Champions: Barlinek Industria Kielce (20th title)
- Relegated: Pogoń Szczecin
- Champions League: Barlinek Industria Kielce; Orlen Wisła Płock
- Matches played: 182
- Goals scored: 10,311 (56.65 per match)
- Top goalscorer: Taras Minotskyi (181 goals)

The 2022–23 Superliga was the 67th season of the Polish Superliga, the top men's handball league in Poland. A total of fourteen teams competed in this season's league, which began on 2 September 2022 and concluded on 21 May 2023.

Barlinek Industria Kielce won their 20th title of the Polish Champions.

== Format ==
The competition format for the 2022–23 season consists of 14 teams each playing a total of 26 matches, half at home and half away, with the first placed team in the standings earning the Polish Championship. The last placed team is directly relegated to the 1st league, and the penultimate team play relegation playoffs with the willing team from the Central League.

The winners are entitled to play in the EHF Champions League the following season. The 2nd, 3rd and 4th team in the standings gain a chance to take part in the upcoming EHF European League edition.

== Teams ==
Location of the 2022–23 Superliga teams.
- The following teams compete in the Superliga during the 2022–23 season:

	Team	Arena	Capacity
1	Łomża Vive Kielce	Hala Legionów	4,200
2	Orlen Wisła Płock	Orlen Arena	5,492
3	Azoty Puławy	Hala MOSiR Puławy	3,362
4	MMTS Kwidzyn	KWS KCSiR	1,504
5	Górnik Zabrze	HWS Pogoń	1,013
6	Energa MKS Kalisz	Arena Kalisz	3,164
7	Piotrkowianin Piotrków Trybunalski	Hala Relax	1,000
8	Chrobry Głogów	HWS Głogów	2,500
9	Gwardia Opole	Stegu Arena	3,378
9	MKS Zagłębie Lubin	HWS RCS Lubin	3,714
11	Torus Wybrzeże Gdańsk	HWS AWFiS Gdańsk	1,700
12	Grupa Azoty Unia Tarnów	Arena Jaskółka Tarnów	4,317
13	Sandra SPA Pogoń Szczecin	Netto Arena	5,403
CL	Arged KPR Ostrovia	Arena Ostrów	2,500

== League table ==
Pos	Team	Pld	W	OTW	OTL	L	GF	GA	GD	Pts	Qualification or relegation
1	Barlinek Industria Kielce	26	25	0	0	1	1021	660	+361	75	EHF Champions League
2	Orlen Wisła Płock	26	25	0	0	1	878	592	+286	75	EHF Champions League
3	Górnik Zabrze	26	17	0	1	8	744	693	+51	52	EHF European League
4	Chrobry Głogów	26	15	0	1	10	721	756	−35	46	EHF European League
5	Torus Wybrzeże Gdańsk	26	14	1	2	9	701	705	−4	46	
6	Azoty Puławy	26	13	2	1	10	769	759	+10	44	
7	Grupa Azoty Unia Tarnów	26	10	1	5	10	692	726	−34	37	
8	MMTS Kwidzyn	26	10	1	0	15	678	740	−62	32	
9	Ostrovia Ostrów Wielkopolski	26	9	1	0	16	682	749	−67	29	
10	Gwardia Opole	26	7	2	0	17	676	774	−98	25	
11	Piotrkowianin Piotrków Trybunalski	26	7	1	1	17	689	752	−63	24	
12	Energa MKS Kalisz	26	6	2	1	17	639	729	−90	23	
13	Zagłębie Lubin	26	5	3	1	17	651	776	−125	22	Relegation playoffs
14	Sandra SPA Pogoń Szczecin	26	5	0	1	20	674	804	−130	16	Relegation to the Central League

Source: PGNiG Superliga

== Results ==
Home \ Away	PUL	GLO	KAL	ZAB	TAR	OPO	KIE	KWI	PLO	OST	PIO	SZC	GDA	LUB
Azoty Puławy		31–27	29–24	30–34	35–32	32–33	21–31	29–26	25–30	24–23	33–25	36–27	29–30	39–27
Chrobry Głogów	33–26		25–26	18–27	29–25	33–28	26–47	29–24	24–36	35–29	35–31	32–27	27–25	33–35
Energa MKS Kalisz	31–38	23–24		19–26	27–26	24–23	26–43	26–27	26–30	28–27	27–23	25–26	26–29	20–18
Górnik Zabrze	32–38	27–33	32–25		27–20	30–24	24–40	28–24	19–30	26–27	29–25	36–24	32–30	31–29
Grupa Azoty Unia Tarnów	34–35	23–25	33–34	21–31		31–24	27–37	25–26	23–35	26–23	30–27	30–28	23–22	30–24
Gwardia Opole	31–30	25–23	27–24	22–29	27–32		24–41	33–25	23–38	22–25	26–22	30–27	23–27	32–28
Barlinek Industria Kielce	39–24	41–25	40–25	40–31	40–25	42–21		42–31	27–24	47–28	40–28	40–23	41–25	39–20
MMTS Kwidzyn	23–30	28–25	35–25	21–32	30–31	31–27	30–35		18–36	23–22	25–24	27–22	25–26	28–31
Orlen Wisła Płock	36–21	42–22	29–23	34–25	33–26	32–18	29–27	48–24		32–26	37–21	35–20	32–24	31–16
Ostrovia Ostrów Wielkopolski	27–22	22–25	29–25	25–24	27–31	26–25	23–45	23–25	28–38		22–26	27–26	41–40	32–27
Piotrkowianin Piotrków Trybunalski	31–33	33–26	26–20	26–29	28–29	34–29	26–40	22–21	23–32	26–30		28–27	32–33	28–25
Sandra SPA Pogoń Szczecin	29–35	25–30	28–29	26–33	28–27	35–29	23–43	26–27	15–32	30–28	25–27		24–41	35–28
Torus Wybrzeże Gdańsk	30–25	24–26	29–26	20–28	26–25	29–27	20–31	23–22	24–32	32–26	33–32	25–24		27–19
Zagłębie Lubin	23–31	31–34	21–20	27–26	27–30	30–31	31–43	22–35	24–35	29–27	23–22	28–27	25–24	

Source: PGNiG Superliga
Legend: Blue = home team win; Red = away team win.
Matches with lighter background shading were decided after overtime.

== Relegation round ==
=== Playoffs ===
Team 1	Agg.	Team 2	1st leg	2nd leg
Stal Mielec	43–53	Zagłębie Lubin	19–22	24–31
