= Nikolaj Læsø =

Danish handball player (born 1996)

Personal information
- Full name: Nikolaj Læsø Dueholm Christensen
- Nationality: Danish
- Born: 15 November 1996 (age 29) Aarhus, Denmark
- Height: 1.96 m (6 ft 5 in)

Sport
- Sport: Handball
- Position: Left back
- Current club: FC Porto
- Number: 32

Senior clubs
- Years: Team
- –2017: Odder Håndbold
- 2017–2020: Aarhus Håndbold
- 2020–2022: Aalborg Håndbold
- 2022–2024: FC Porto
- 2024–: Bjerringbro-Silkeborg Håndbold
National team
| Years | Team | Apps | (Gls) |
| 2021– | Denmark | 6 | (5) |
Medal record
World Championship
| Gold medal – first place | 2021 Egypt |

Nikolaj Læsø Dueholm Christensen (born 15 November 1996) is a Danish handball player for FC Porto and the Danish national team.

He represented Denmark at the 2021 World Men's Handball Championship, where he won a gold medal.
