= Eric Johansson (handballer) =

Swedish handball player (born 2000)

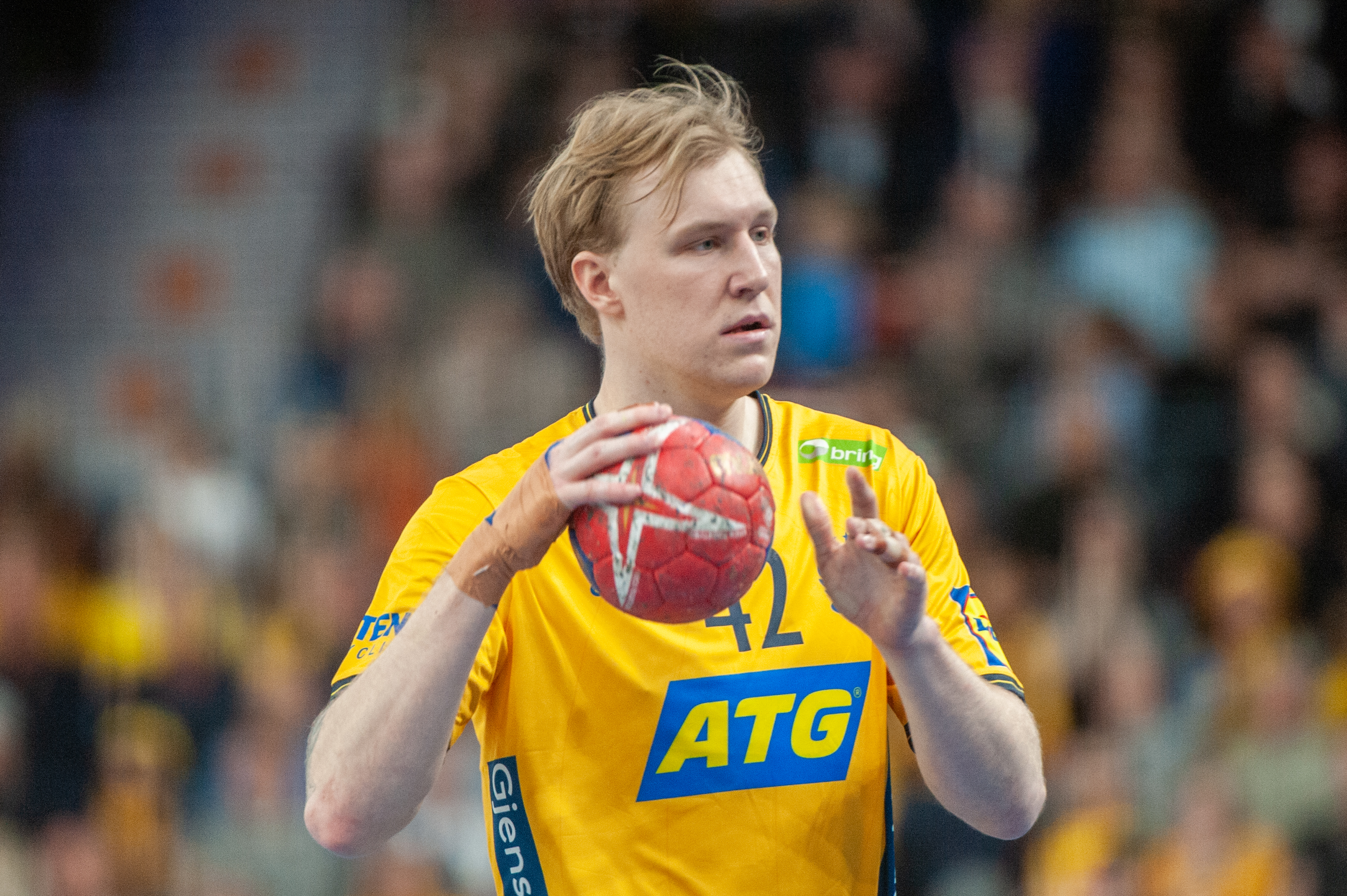
- Johansson with Sweden in 2023

Personal information
- Full name: Eric Oscar Johansson
- Nationality: Swedish
- Born: 28 June 2000 (age 26) Eskilstuna, Sweden
- Height: 1.98 m (6 ft 6 in)

Sport
- Sport: Handball
- Position: Left back
- Current club: THW Kiel
- Number: 21

Senior clubs
- Years: Team
- 2017–2021: Eskilstuna Guif
- 2021–2022: Elverum Håndball
- 2022–: THW Kiel
National team
Years	Team	Apps	(Gls)
2021–	Sweden	52	(147)
Medal record
European Championship
Gold medal – first place	2022 Hungary/Slovakia
Bronze medal – third place	2024 Germany
Youth European Championship
Gold medal – first place	2018 Croatia
- Updated on 14 January 2026

Eric Oscar Johansson (born 28 June 2000) is a Swedish professional handball player for THW Kiel and the Swedish national team.

He represented Sweden in the 2022 European Men's Handball Championship and won gold medal.

He has previously played for the Norwegian handball club Elverum.

== Achievements ==
- Handball-Bundesliga
  - Gold: 2023
- DHB-Pokal
  - Gold: 2025
- DHB-Supercup
  - Gold: 2022, 2023
- Norwegian League
  - Gold: 2022
- Norwegian Cup
  - Gold: 2021

Individual awards

- Handball-Planet – Best World Young Handball Player: 2022
