= Palais des sports René-Bougnol =

Indoor arena in Montpellier, France

- Bougnol
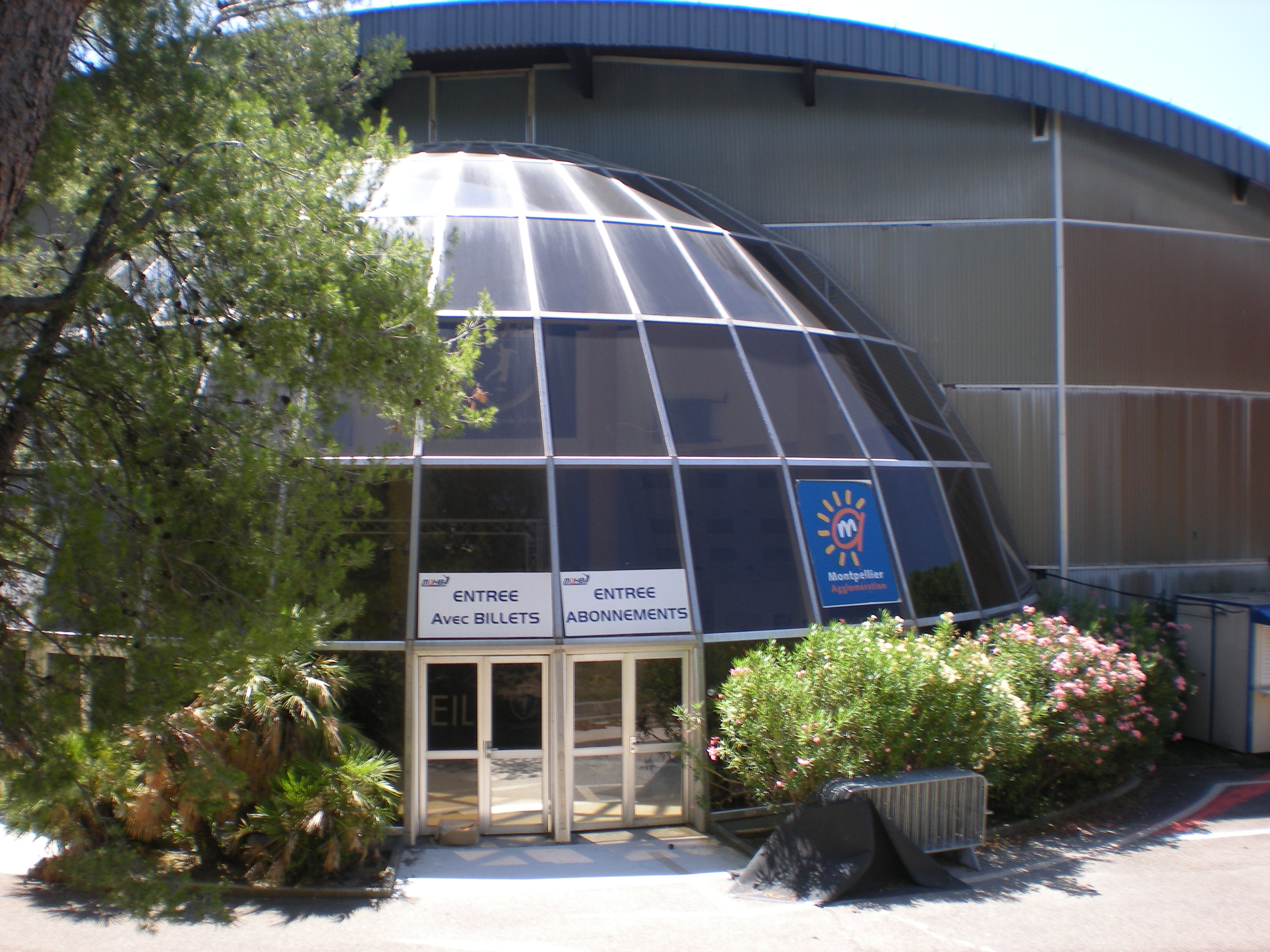
- Interactive map of Palais des sports René-Bougnol
- Location: Montpellier, France
- Coordinates: 43.638234°N 3.873901°E
- Capacity: 3,000

Construction
- Opened: 1977

Tenant
- Montpellier Handball

Palais des sports René-Bougnol, or FDI Stadium for sponsorship reasons, is an indoor sporting arena located in Montpellier, France. The seating capacity of the arena is 3,000 people. It is currently home to the Montpellier Handball team.

== History ==
The Palais des Sports was inaugurated in 1977. It is named after René Bougnol, a former fencer from Montpellier who won three Olympic medals in the team foil event (1932, 1936 and 1948).

On December 13, 1979, the Australian band AC/DC gave a concert at Bougnol as part of their Highway to Hell tour.

In 1986, the Palais des Sports hosted World Volleyball Championship matches. In 2001, it hosted men's World Handball Championship matches.

In 2003, the MHB won the prestigious Champions League against the club from Pamplona, where Jackson Richardson was playing at the time, by a score of 31-19 after the heavy defeat in the first leg of the final (27-19).

Known as a "cauldron" and led by its "Bluefox" supporters, Bougnol is the venue for MHB's victories against European teams, even though, from 2010 onwards, the club will be playing its fixtures at the Sud de France Arena.

From March 22 to 24, 2024, the arena will host the French Table Tennis Championships 2024.
