= Lukas Mertens =

German handball player (born 1996)

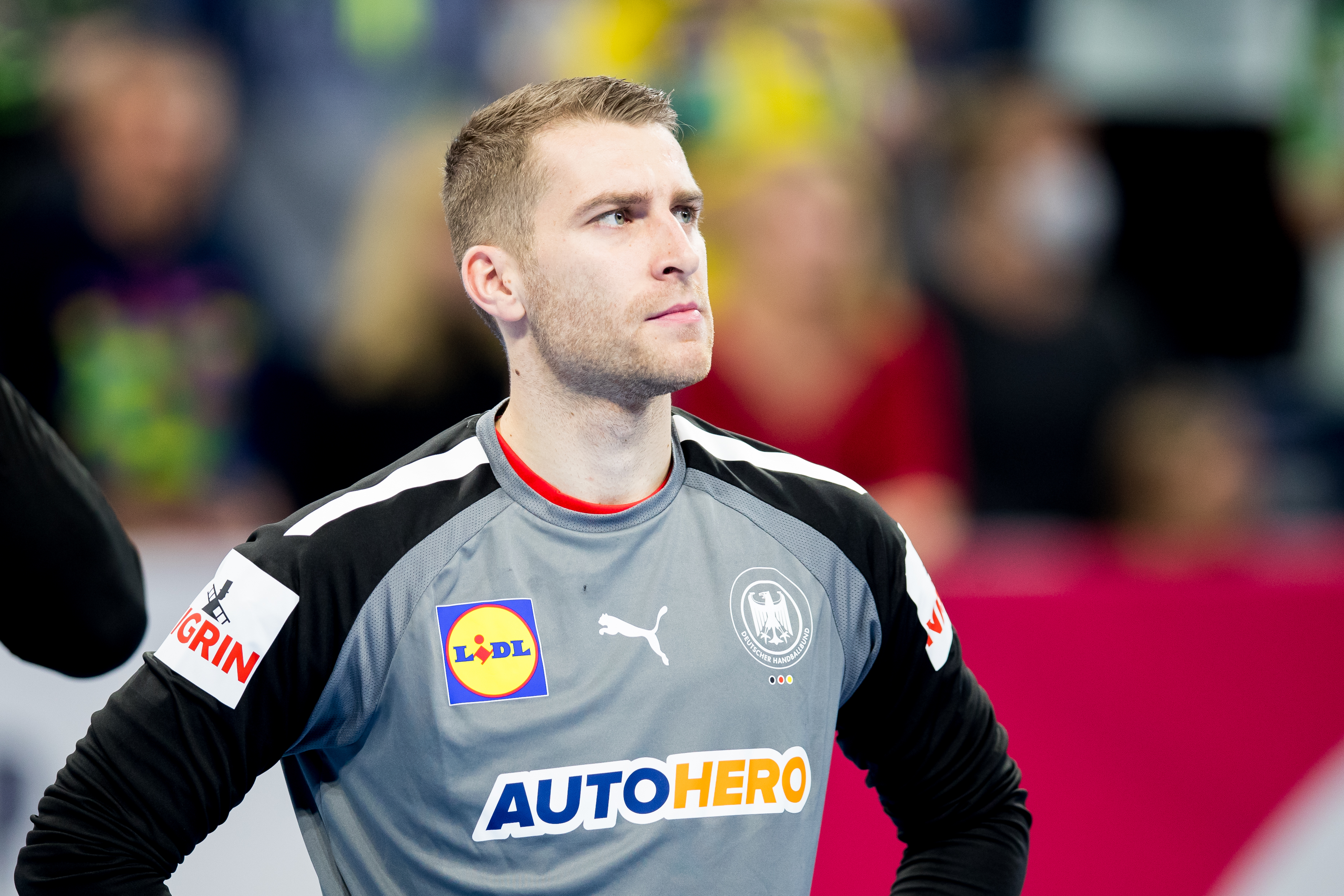
- Mertens in 2022

Personal information
- Nationality: German
- Born: 22 March 1996 (age 30) Wilhelmshaven, Germany
- Height: 1.82 m (6 ft 0 in)

Sport
- Sport: Handball
- Position: Left wing
- Current club: SC Magdeburg
- Number: 22

Youth career
- Years: Team
- –2013: JSG Wilhelmshaven

Senior clubs
- Years: Team
- 2013–2017: Wilhelmshavener HV
- 2017–: SC Magdeburg
National team
Years	Team	Apps	(Gls)
2021–	Germany	80	(183)
Medal record
Olympic Games
Silver medal – second place	2024 Paris	Team
European Championship
Silver medal – second place	2026 Denmark/Norway/Sweden
- Updated on 8 November 2026

Lukas Mertens (born 22 March 1996) is a German handball player for SC Magdeburg and the German national team.

== Career ==
As a youth player he played for JSG Wilhelmshaven. In 2013 he joined Wilhelmshavener HV. In 2015 he helped the team getting promoted from the 2nd Bundesliga.

In 2017 he joined SC Magdeburg. Here he won the EHF European League and the IHF Men's Super Globe in 2021 and the German Championship in 2022 and the Super Globe for a second time. In 2023 he won the 2022-23 EHF Champions League, beating Kielce in the final 30-29. The same year he won the Super Globe for the third time in a row. In 2024 he won the DHB-Pokal. In the final against MT Melsungen he was the topscorer with 7 goals. In 2025 he won his second Champions League, beating German rivals Füchse Berlin in the final.

== National team ==
Mertens made his debut for the German national team on 5 November 2021 in a friendly against Portugal. He participated at the 2022 European Men's Handball Championship. His tournament was hoever ended prematurily due to a positive Covid-19 test. At the 2023 World Men's Handball Championship he finished 5th with Germany. The year after he was part of the Germany team that reached the semifinals of the 2024 European Men's Handball Championship, where they lost to Denmark. Later the same year he won a silver medal at the 2024 Olympics. Once again, Germany lost to Denmark.

At the 2025 World Men's Handball Championship he finished 6th with Germany. At the 2026 European Men's Handball Championship he won silver medals, losing to Denmark in the final.

== Honours ==
- EHF Champions League:
  - Gold: 2023, 2025
  - Bronze: 2026
- EHF European League:
  - Gold: 2021
  - Silver: 2022
  - Bronze: 2018
- IHF Super Globe:
  - Gold: 2021, 2022, 2023
  - Silver: 2024
  - Bronze: 2025
- Handball-Bundesliga:
  - Gold: 2022, 2024, 2026
  - Silver: 2023, 2025
- DHB-Pokal:
  - Gold: 2024
  - Silver: 2019, 2022, 2023
- DHB-Supercup:
  - Gold: 2026
  - Silver: 2022, 2024
