= Kamil Syprzak =

Polish handball player (born 1991)

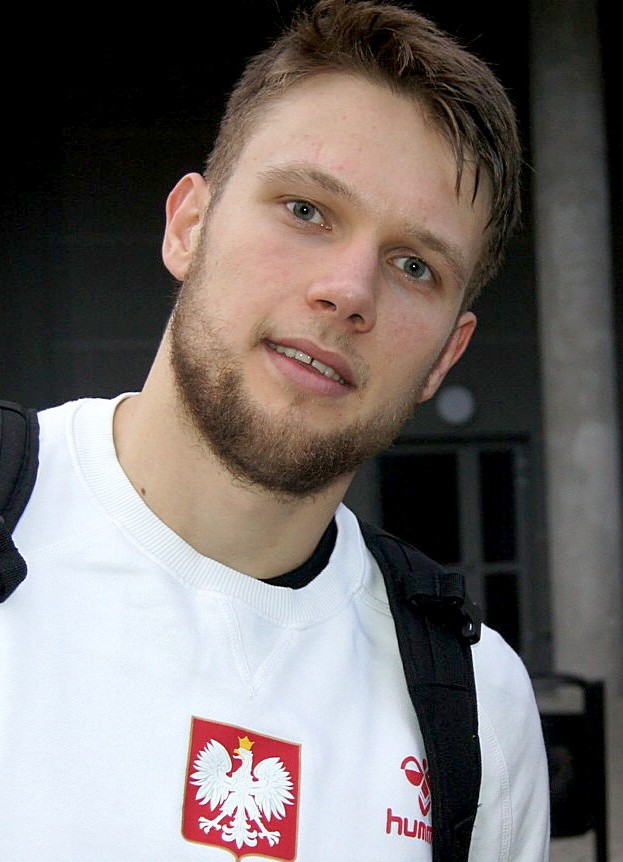
- Syprzak in 2013

Personal information
- Nationality: Polish
- Born: 23 July 1991 (age 35) Płock, Poland
- Height: 2.07 m (6 ft 9 in)

Sport
- Sport: Handball
- Position: Pivot
- Current club: Paris Saint-Germain
- Number: 21

Senior clubs
- Years: Team
- 2009–2015: Wisła Płock
- 2015–2019: FC Barcelona Lassa
- 2019–: Paris Saint-Germain
National team
Years	Team	Apps	(Gls)
2011–	Poland	175	(394)
Medal record
World Championship
Bronze medal – third place	2015 Qatar
- Updated on 12 January 2025

Kamil Syprzak (born 23 July 1991) is a Polish professional handball player for Paris Saint-Germain and the Polish national team.

== Career ==
Syprzak started his career at Orlen Wisła Płock, where he won the Polish Championship in 2011. On 9 June 2015, he joined FC Barcelona. On 22 February 2019, it was stated that he will be playing for Paris Saint-Germain in the next season.

=== National team ===
On 1 February 2015, Poland, including Syprzak, won the bronze medal of the 2015 World Championship. In the winning bronze medal match (29:28) against Spain, he threw last goal for Poland in extra time. He also participated at the 2016 Summer Olympics in Rio de Janeiro, in the men's handball tournament.

== Achievements ==
=== Club ===
Barcelona

- Spanish league: 2016, 2017, 2018, 2019
- Spanish Cup: 2016, 2017, 2018, 2019
- Spanish super cup: 2016, 2017, 2018, 2019

PSG

- French league: 2020, 2021, 2022, 2023, 2024, 2025, 2026
- French cup: 2021, 2022
- Champions' Trophy: 2019, 2023

== Sporting achievements ==
=== State awards ===
- 2015 Silver Cross of Merit

=== Individual awards ===
- All-Star Team as Best Line player of EHF Champions League: 2022
- Topscorer EHF Champions League: 2024
- All-Star Team as Best line player of the French league: 2023
