= Melvyn Richardson =

French handball player (born 1997)

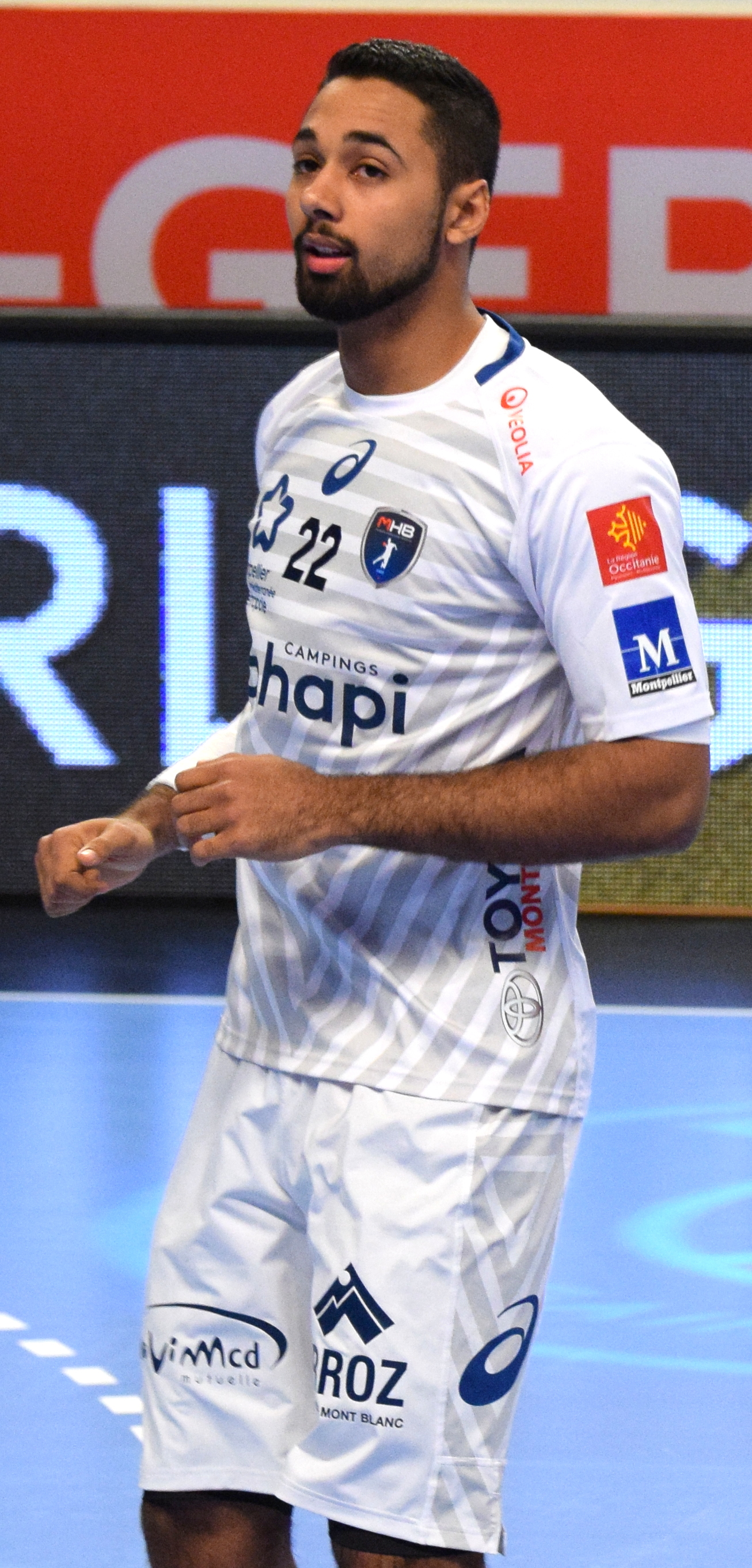
- Richardson in 2018

Personal information
- Nationality: French
- Born: 31 January 1997 (age 29) Marseille, France
- Height: 1.90 m (6 ft 3 in)

Sport
- Sport: Handball
- Position: Right back
- Current club: FC Barcelona
- Number: 66

Youth career
- Years: Team
- 2005–2015: Chambéry SMBH

Senior clubs
- Years: Team
- 2015–2017: Chambéry SMBH
- 2017–2021: Montpellier Handball
- 2021–2025: FC Barcelona
- 2025–: Wisła Płock
National team
Years	Team	Apps	(Gls)
2017–	France	113	(291)
Medal record
Olympic Games
Gold medal – first place	2020 Tokyo	Team
World Championship
Silver medal – second place	2023 Poland/Sweden
Bronze medal – third place	2019 Germany/Denmark
Bronze medal – third place	2025 Croatia/Denmark/Norway
European Championship
Gold medal – first place	2024 Germany
- Updated on 14 January 2026

Melvyn Richardson (born 31 January 1997) is a French professional handball player for FC Barcelona and the French national team.

== Personal life ==
He is the son of retired French handball player Jackson Richardson.

== Career ==
In 2021 he joined Spanish top team FC Barcelona. Here he won the 2022 and 2024 Champion Leagues and the Liga ASOBAL, Copa ASOBAL and Copa del Rey every season at the club.

From the 2025-26 season he will join the Polish team Wisła Płock.

=== National team ===
Melvyn Richardson debuted for the French national team on June 17th, 2017 against Belgium. His first major international tournament was the 2019 World Championship.

In September 2021 he won Olympic gold medals at the 2021 Olympics in Tokyo. For this he was made a knight of the French Legion of Honour.

At the 2024 European Championship he won a second gold medal with French team. He played 8 matches and scored 16 goals. At the 2025 World Championship he won a bronze medal, losing to Croatia in the semifinal and beating Portugal in the third place playoff. He played all 9 games, scoring 30 goals.

== Achievements ==
=== Club ===
- EHF Champions League:
  - Winner: 2018, 2022, 2024
- Liga ASOBAL:
  - Winner: 2022, 2023, 2024
- Copa ASOBAL:
  - Winner: 2022, 2023, 2024
- Copa del Rey:
  - Winner: 2022, 2023, 2024
- Supercopa Ibérica:
  - Winner: 2022, 2023

=== International ===
- World Championship:
  - Bronze Medalist: 2019
- Junior World Championship:
  - Bronze Medalist: 2017
- Youth World Championship:
  - Gold Medalist: 2015
- Youth European Championship:
  - Gold Medalist: 2014

=== Individual ===
- MVP EHF Champions League Final four: 2023–24
- All-Star Right Back of the Youth European Championship: 2014
- MVP of the Youth World Championship: 2015
- Best young player of the LNH Division 1: 2017
