= Aaron Mensing =

Danish-German handball player (born 1997)

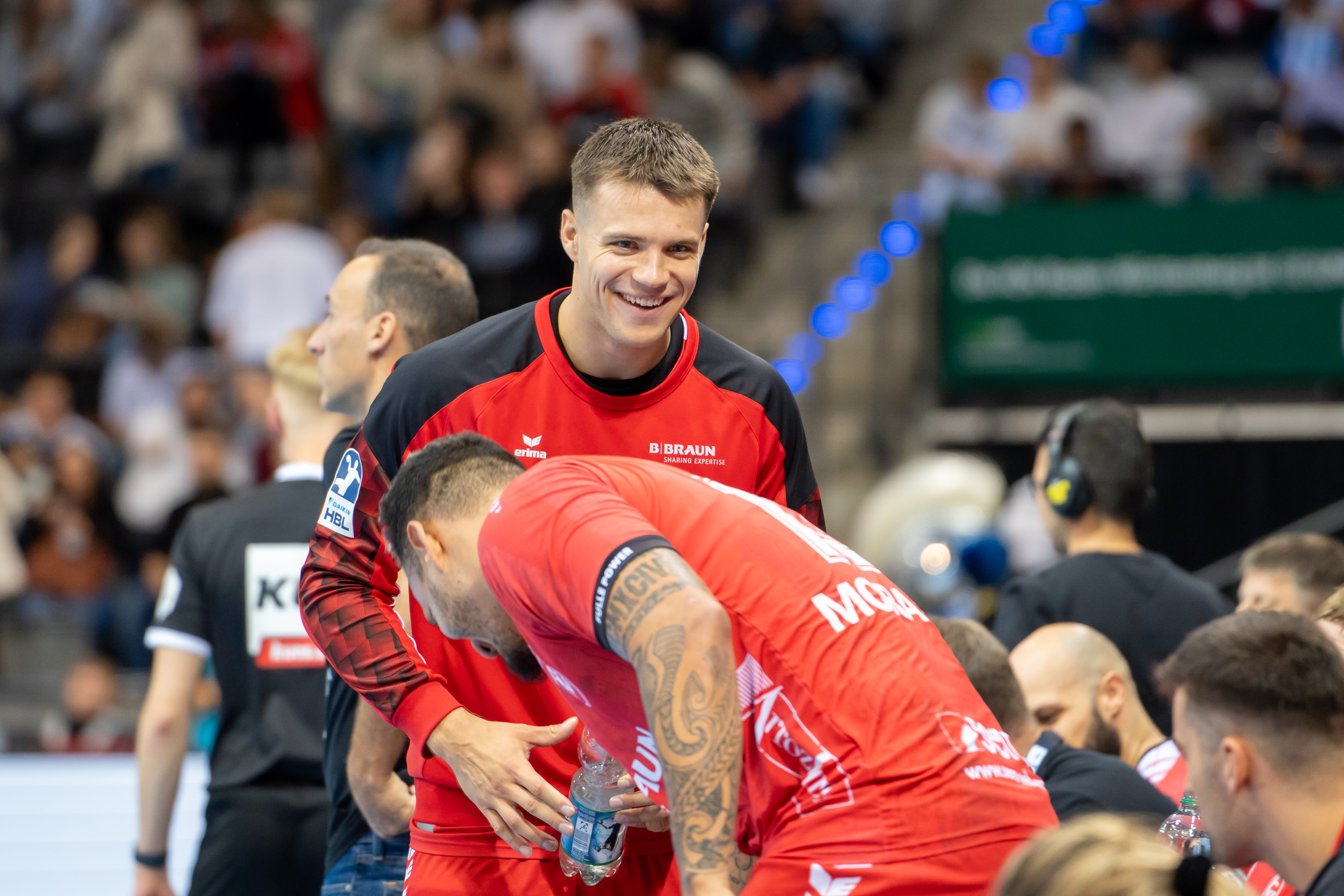

Personal information
- Full name: Hans Aaron Mensing
- Nationality: Danish
- Born: 11 November 1997 (age 28) Sønderborg, Denmark
- Height: 1.99 m (6 ft 6 in)

Sport
- Sport: Handball
- Position: Left back
- Current club: MT Melsungen
- Number: 33

Youth career
- Years: Team
- –: SG Flensburg-Handewitt
- –: SønderjyskE Herrehåndbold

Senior clubs
- Years: Team
- 2016–2020: SønderjyskE Herrehåndbold
- 2020–2021: TTH Holstebro
- 2021–2023: SG Flensburg-Handewitt
- 2023–2024: GOG Håndbold
- 2024–: MT Melsungen
National team
Years	Team	Apps	(Gls)
2021–	Denmark	24	(53)
Medal record
European Championship
Silver medal – second place	2024 Germany
Bronze medal – third place	2022 Hungary/Slovakia
- Updated on 31 August 2024

Hans Aaron Mensing (born 11 November 1997) is a Danish handball player for MT Melsungen and the Denmark men's national handball team.

Mensing was eligible to play international handball for both Germany and Denmark. He chose to represent Denmark and made his debut in April 2021.

== Career ==
He played for the SG Flensburg-Handewitt youth teams until 12 years old. In 2015 he debuted in the Danish league for Sønderjyske.

In 2020 he transferred to TTH Holstebro. The next season he made the league allstar team.

The next summer he signed for his old Childhood club SG Flensburg-Handewitt. For the 2023–24 season he joined Danish GOG Håndbold for a single season, before joining MT Melsungen. In early March 2025 he tore his achilles in a EHF European League match against THW Kiel. He returned to the court a year after in March 2026.

== Honours ==
=== Clubs ===
MT Melsungen

- EHF European League Champion: 2025–2026

=== Individual ===
- Herre Handbold Ligaen All-Star team of the season 2020–2021
