= Emil Madsen =

Danish handball player (born 2001)

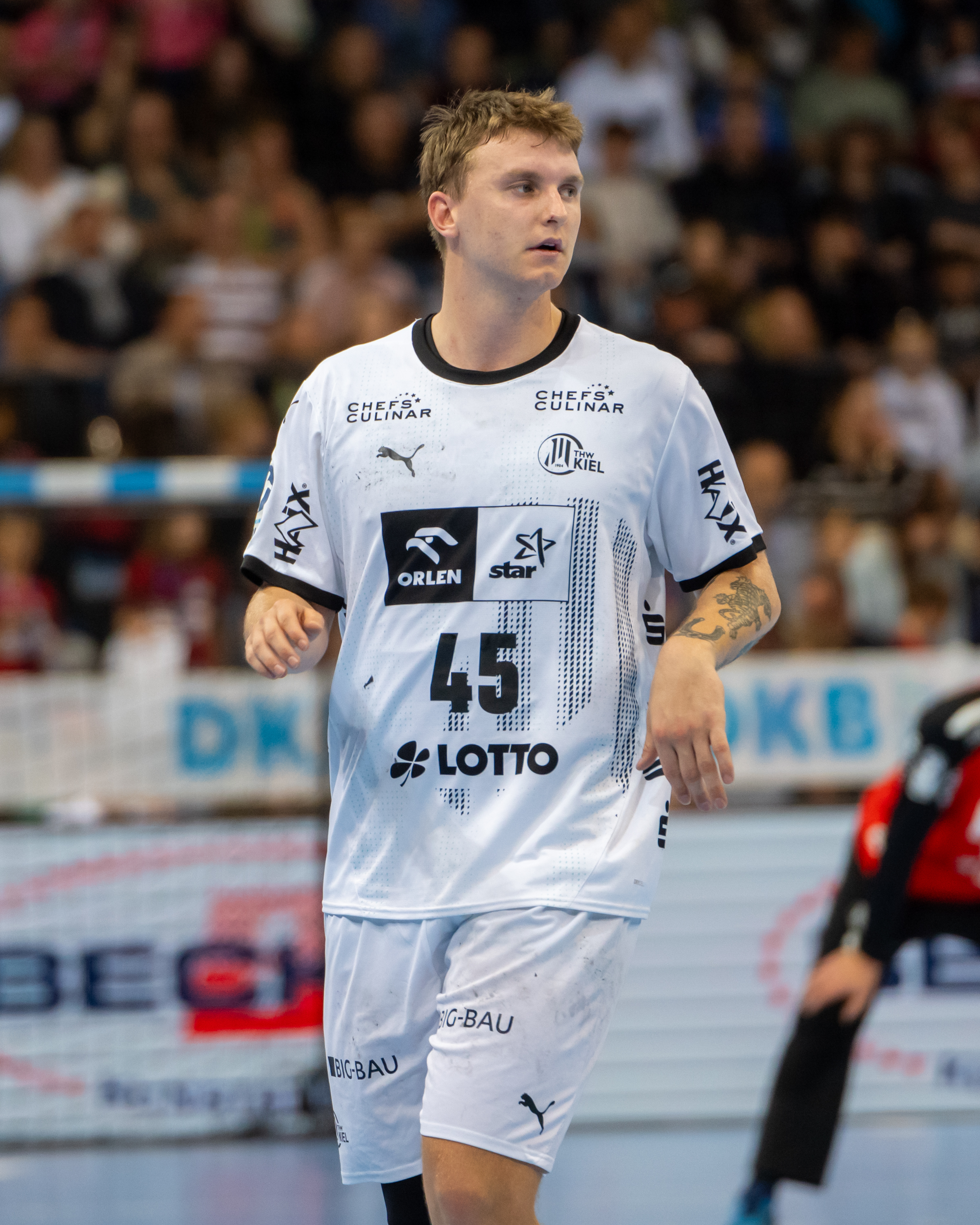
- Madsen in 2025

Personal information
- Full name: Emil Wernsdorf Madsen
- Nationality: Danish
- Born: 1 January 2001 (age 25) Svendborg, Denmark
- Height: 1.94 m (6 ft 4 in)

Sport
- Sport: Handball
- Position: Right back
- Current club: THW Kiel
- Number: 45

Youth career
- Years: Team
- –: GOG Håndbold

Senior clubs
- Years: Team
- 2019–2024: GOG Håndbold
- 2024–: THW Kiel
National team
Years	Team	Apps	(Gls)
2023–	Denmark	10	(23)
Medal record
World Championship
Gold medal – first place	2025 Croatia/Denmark/Norway
European Championship
Silver medal – second place	2024 Germany
- Updated on 29 January 2024

Emil Wernsdorf Madsen (born 1 January 2001) is a Danish handball player for THW Kiel and the Danish national team.

== Career ==
In November 2020, he signed a contract with Skanderborg Håndbold for the upcoming season, however he chose to terminate the contract only three months later and instead stayed in GOG. With GOG he won the Danish Championship twice and the Danish Cup three times.

In 2024 he joined German top team THW Kiel. Here he won the DHB-Pokal in 2025.

== National team ==
He made his debut for the national team on 27 April 2023.

Madsen's first appearance in an international tournament came at the 2024 European Men's Handball Championship. He ended up playing in just two matches - the group stage game against Greece, where he scored seven goals, and the final main round game against Slovenia - as Denmark finished second, losing out on the title to France.

At the 2025 World Championship he won gold medals with the Danish team.

== Achievements ==
- Danish League:
  - Gold: 2022, 2023
- Danish Cup:
  - Gold: 2019, 2022, 2023
- DHB-Pokal
  - Gold: 2025

Individual awards

- MVP (Pokalfighter) Danish Cup 2021
- Top scorer 2022–23 Danish League (252 goals), 2023–24 (192 goals)
- Top scorer 2022–23 EHF Champions League (107 goals)
