= Mads Hoxer Hangaard =

Danish handball player (born 2000)

Personal information
- Nationality: Danish
- Born: 6 December 2000 (age 25) Thisted, Denmark
- Height: 1.96 m (6 ft 5 in)

Sport
- Sport: Handball
- Position: Right back
- Current club: Aalborg Håndbold
- Number: 14

Youth career
- Years: Team
- –2016: Thisted IK / Thy Håndbold
- 2016–2017: Ikast Håndbold
- 2017–2020: HF Mors

Senior clubs
- Years: Team
- 2019–2022: Mors-Thy Håndbold
- 2022–: Aalborg Håndbold
National team
| Years | Team | Apps | (Gls) |
| 2021– | Denmark | 21 | (47) |
Medal record
World Championship
| Gold medal – first place | 2023 Poland/Sweden |
European Championship
| Gold medal – first place | 2026 Denmark/Norway/Sweden |
Youth European Championship
| Bronze medal – third place | 2018 Croatia |
- Updated on 3 February 2026

Mads Hoxer Hangaard (born 6 December 2000) is a Danish handball player for Aalborg Håndbold and the Danish national team.

== Career ==
Hoxer started playing handball at the age of 5. He participated in the 2018 European Men's U-18 Handball Championship and won a bronze medal. He also participated in the 2019 Men's Youth World Handball Championship, once again winning a bronze medal with Denmark.

With Mors-Thy Håndbold he won the 2020 Danish Men's Handball Cup, and was chosen as the MVP of the final four event. This was the first time ever that Mors-Thy won a top-level trophy.

He debuted for the Danish national team on 2 May 2021 in a European Championship qualification match against Finland.

In the summer of 2022 he joined Danish top club Aalborg Håndbold on a contract until 2025, and only 1 month later they extended his contract with one further year.

He was part of the initial roster for the 2024 Olympics but had to withdraw due to injury. In 2025, he won the Danish Cup for a second time, this time with Aalborg Håndbold, beating Bjerringbro-Silkeborg in the final. Later the same season, he won the Danish championship.

In November 2025 he extended his contract at Aalborg until 2030 despite interest from other clubs.

At the 2026 European Men's Handball Championship he won gold medals, meaning that Denmark held both the World, European and Olympic titles at the same time, as only the second team ever after France's 'Les Experts'.

== Private life ==
His father, Flemming Hangaard, is a coach at Mors-Thy Håndbold's B-team. His sister, Ida, is also a handball player.
