= Daniil Shishkaryov =

Russian handball player

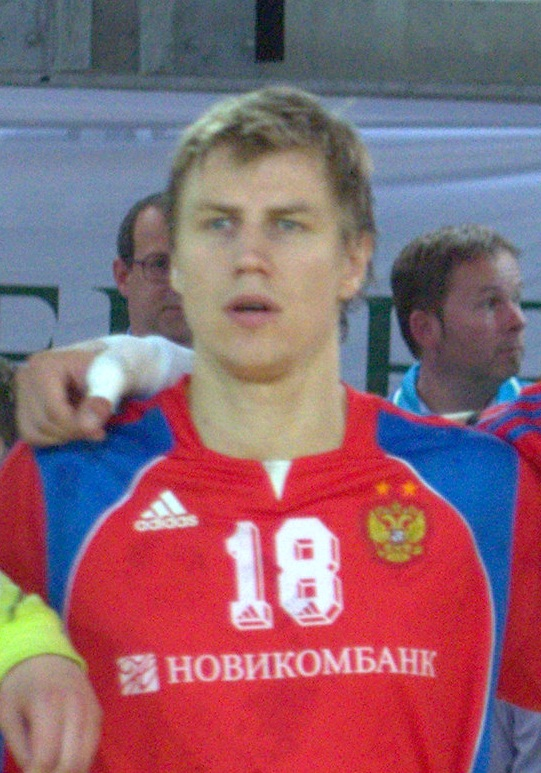

Personal information
- Nationality: Russian
- Born: 6 July 1988 (age 38) Kostanay, Kazakh SSR
- Height: 1.90 m (6 ft 3 in)

Sport
- Sport: Handball
- Position: Right wing
- Current club: HBC CSKA Moscow
- Number: 33

Senior clubs
- Years: Team
- 2007–2009: ZK Astrakhan
- 2009–2014: Chekhovskiye Medvedi
- 2014–2020: RK Vardar
- 2020–2021: Telekom Veszprém
- 2021–2022: Chekhovskiye Medvedi
- 2022–: HBC CSKA Moscow
National team
Years	Team	Apps	(Gls)
–	Russia	125	(320)

Daniil Borisovich Shishkaryov (Russian: Даниил Борисович Шишкарёв; born 6 July 1988) is a Russian handball player for HBC CSKA Moscow and the Russian national team.

== RK Vardar ==
=== Honours ===
- Macedonian Handball Super League

Winner : 2014–15, 2015–16, 2016–17, 2017–18, 2018–19

- Macedonian Handball Cup

Winner : 2014, 2015, 2016, 2017, 2018

- Macedonian Handball Super Cup

Winner : 2017, 2018, 2019

=== European competitions ===
- EHF Champions League

Winner (2): 2016–17, 2018–19

=== Other competitions ===
- SEHA League

Winner : 2013–14, 2016–17, 2017–18, 2018–19
Runner-up: 2015–16, 2019–20

- IHF Super Globe

Third placed: 2017, 2019
