= Vlado Nedanovski =

North Macedonian handball player

Personal information
- Nationality: Macedonian
- Born: 23 June 1985 (age 41) Resen, Yugoslavia
- Height: 1.87 m (6 ft 2 in)

Sport
- Sport: Handball
- Position: Left wing

Senior clubs
- Years: Team
- 2003–2008: (North Macedonia) RK Vardar PRO
- 2008–2010: (North Macedonia) RK Metalurg Skopje
- 2010–2012: (North Macedonia) RK Pelister
- 2012–2014: (North Macedonia) RK Vardar
- 2014–2016: (North Macedonia) RK Vardar Junior
- 2016–2019: (North Macedonia) RK Vardar
National team
- Years: Team
- –: Macedonia

Teams managed
- 2019–2020: (North Macedonia) RK Alushevski (youth category)
- 2020–2021: (North Macedonia) RK Vardar (assistant)
- 2021: (North Macedonia) RK Vardar (interim)
- 2022: (North Macedonia) RK Vardar (assistant)
- 2022–2024: (North Macedonia) RK Vardar

Vlado Nedanovski (born 23 June 1985) is a retired Macedonian handball player. After he retired as a player, Vlado started with coaching Handball. Currently he is the coach of HC Vardar.

== Honours ==
- As Player

=== Domestic competitions ===
- Macedonian Handball Super League:

Winner: 2003–04, 2006–07, 2009–10,2012–13, 2016–17, 2017–18, 2018-19

- Macedonian Handball Cup:

Winner: 2004, 2007, 2008, 2009, 2010, 2014, 2017, 2018

=== European competitions ===
- EHF Champions League

Winner: 2016–17, 2018–19

=== Other competitions ===
- SEHA League:

Winner: 2013–14, 2016–17, 2017–18, 2018–19

- As Manager

RK Vardar

- Macedonian Handball Cup:

Winner: 2023
