= Ivan Čupić =

Croatian handball player (born 1986)

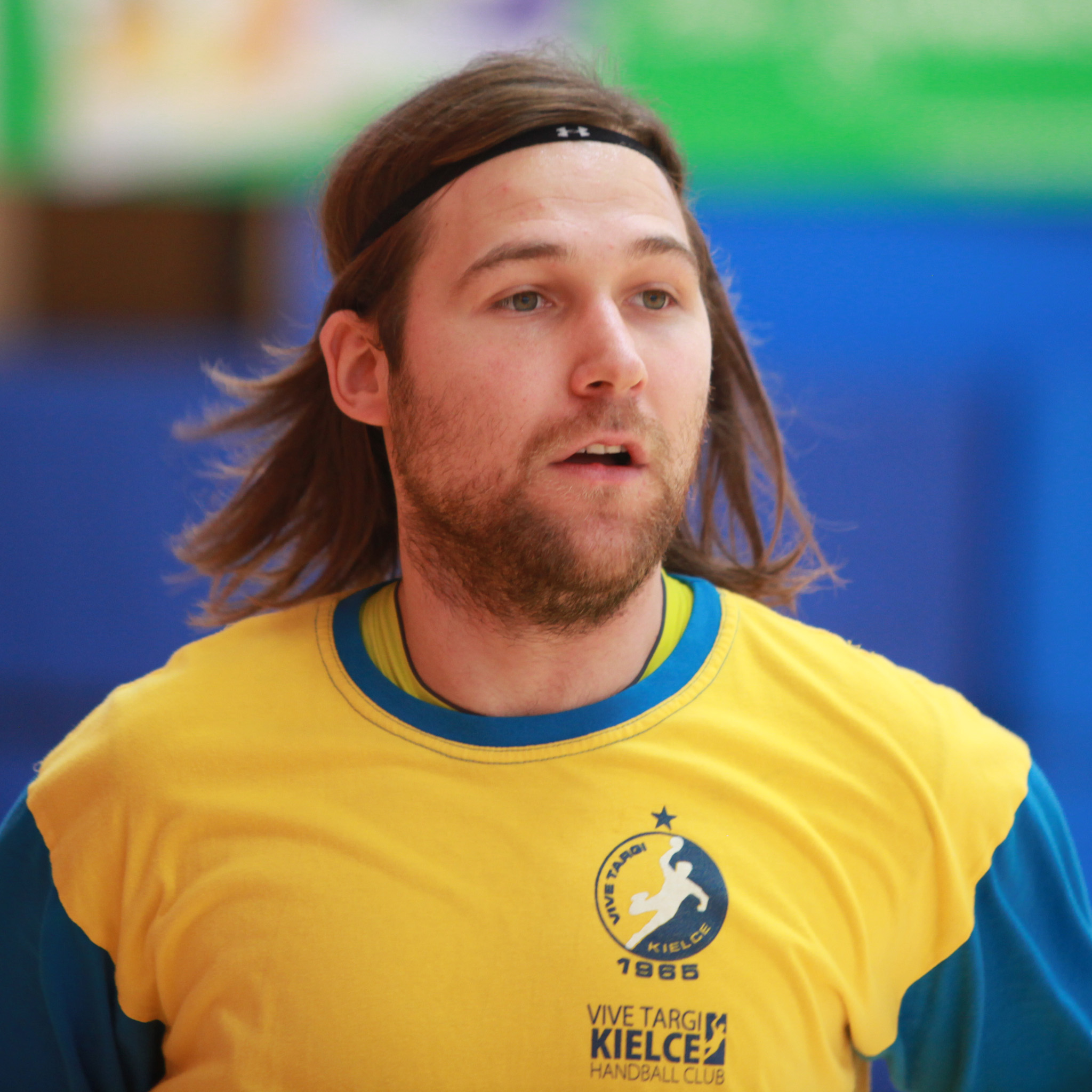
- Čupić with Vive Targi Kielce in 2013

Personal information
- Nationality: Croatian
- Born: 27 March 1986 (age 40) Metković, SR Croatia, Yugoslavia
- Height: 1.78 m (5 ft 10 in)

Sport
- Sport: Handball
- Position: Right wing
- Current club: RK Zagreb

Senior clubs
- Years: Team
- 2002–2005: RK Metković
- 2005–2007: RK Medveščak
- 2007–2008: SD Octavio Vigo
- 2008–2010: RK Gorenje Velenje
- 2010–2012: Rhein-Neckar Löwen
- 2012–2016: Vive Tauron Kielce
- 2016–2021: RK Vardar 1961
- 2021–2024: RK Zagreb
National team
Years	Team	Apps	(Gls)
2005–2024	Croatia	137	(511)

Teams managed
- 2024: RK Zagreb (assistant)
- 2024: RK Zagreb 2
- 2025: RK Metković
- 2025–: RK Vardar 1961
Medal record
Olympic Games
Bronze medal – third place	2012 London	Team
World Championships
Silver medal – second place	2009 Croatia
Bronze medal – third place	2013 Spain
European Championships
Silver medal – second place	2008 Norway
Silver medal – second place	2010 Austria
Bronze medal – third place	2012 Serbia
Bronze medal – third place	2016 Poland
Mediterranean Games
Silver medal – second place	2005 Almería	Team
U-19 World Championship
Bronze medal – third place	2005 Qatar

Ivan Čupić (born 27 March 1986) is a Croatian former handball player. He was inducted into the EHF Hall of Fame in 2024.

== Career ==
He was selected by the Croatian national team for the 2009 World Men's Handball Championship. He scored 8 goals in the opening match against South Korea, settling as the top scorer after the first day. He also played in the Croatian team that won the bronze medal at the 2012 Summer Olympics.

Čupić missed the Games of XXIX Olympiad in Beijing, after losing his left ring finger in bizarre accident in July 2008. During a training session, Čupić fell and caught his wedding ring on a wire fence. The force of the fall severed his finger at the first joint. Though the amputated portion of the digit could not be reattached, his career has since been unaffected by having only nine fingers.

== Honours ==
Gorenje

- Slovenian First League: 2008–09
- Slovenian Super Cup: 2009

Vive Tauron Kielce

- EHF Champions League: 2015–16
- Polish Championship: 2013, 2014, 2015, 2016
- Polish Cup: 2013, 2014, 2015, 2016

RK Vardar

- Macedonian Super League: 2017, 2018, 2019, 2021
- Macedonian Cup: 2017, 2018, 2021
- Macedonian Super Cup: 2017, 2018, 2019
- EHF Champions League: 2016–17, 2018–19
- SEHA League: 2016-17, 2017-18, 2018-19

RK Zagreb

- Croatian Premier League: 2022, 2023
- Croatian Cup: 2022

=== As Handball Manager ===
RK Vardar

- Macedonian Handball Super League (North Macedonia)

Winner Gold :2026

- Macedonian Cup (North Macedonia)

Winner Gold : 2026
