= Marko Kizikj =

Macedonian handball player

Personal information
- Nationality: Macedonian
- Born: 22 January 2001 (age 25) Skopje, Macedonia
- Height: 1.93 m (6 ft 4 in)

Sport
- Sport: Handball
- Position: Goalkeeper
- Current club: RK Alkaloid
- Number: 1

Youth career
- Years: Team
- –: RK Vardar 1961

Senior clubs
- Years: Team
- –: RK Vardar Junior
- 2018–2021: RK Vardar 1961
- 2021–2024: RK Eurofarm Pelister
- 2024–: RK Alkaloid
National team
- Years: Team
- 2019–: North Macedonia

Marko Kizikj (born 22 January 2001) is a Macedonian handball player who plays as a goalkeeper for RK Alkaloid and the North Macedonia national team.

== Early life and background ==
Born in Skopje, Macedonia, Kizikj began playing handball at the age of 10, initially as a left back before transitioning to the goalkeeper position. He joined the youth academy of RK Vardar, where he progressed through various youth selections. At 18, he made his debut in the EHF Champions League, describing the experience as a dream come true.

== Club career ==
=== RK Vardar 1961 (2018–2021) ===
Kizikj was promoted to the senior team of RK Vardar in 2018. During his tenure he was part of the squad that won the EHF Champions League in 2018–19, as well as multiple domestic titles, including the Macedonian Handball Super League and the Macedonian Handball Cup. In November 2019, during a VELUX EHF Champions League match against Meshkov Brest, he spent the last 15 minutes on court and made five key saves—one a double stop—earning “Best Save of the Round” recognition on EHF social media.

=== RK Eurofarm Pelister (2021–2024) ===
In 2021, Kizikj transferred to RK Eurofarm Pelister, where he became first-choice goalkeeper. His performances were instrumental in the club securing back-to-back Macedonian Handball Super League titles in 2023 and 2024. He also gained experience in European competitions, including the EHF Champions League and the EHF European League.

On 14 February 2023, in an EHF European League match against Portuguese side Águas Santas, he made eight saves, including a last-second stop to secure a 27–27 draw and keep Pelister in contention for the knockout stages. That save was later named among the Top 5 Saves of the Round in the competition.

In November 2023, Kizikj was named MVP of Round 10 in the Macedonian Handball Super League after making 26 saves against Golden Art, leading Pelister to a convincing victory.

=== RK Alkaloid (2024–present) ===
On 25 July 2024, Kizikj joined RK Alkaloid, bringing his experience and shot-stopping skills to the recently promoted club in the Macedonian Handball Super League. It was proven that his impact was immediate in the domestic competitions, by helping Alkaloid win the Macedonian Handball Super Cup in 2024.

On 6 April 2025, during a match against Tikvesh, he produced three consecutive saves in a single attack—denying two shots from Ani Obina and one from Dimitar Kocev—showcasing his exceptional reflexes and earning his place on the headlines of the local sports news.

On 18 May 2025, in the first leg of the EHF European Cup final against AEK Athens, Kizikj recorded 10 saves, instrumental in Alkaloid's 29–25 away victory and securing a four-goal advantage for the second leg in Skopje. Later, Alkaloid secured the win in the second leg as well with a result of 10–0 after AEK Athens refused to play, earning Kizikj his second European trophy.

== International career ==
Kizikj debuted for the Macedonian national handball team in 2019. He has since participated in major tournaments, including the European Championship and the World Championship. During the 2025 World Men's Handball Championship, he recorded 15 saves in Macedonia's 29–20 win over Guinea.

In June 2025, he was among the handball players honored by the Government of Macedonia with a state sports pension award in recognition of his contributions to the sport, since he is one of the Macedonian players who has won the EHF Champions League.

== Honours ==
=== RK Vardar 1961 ===
==== Domestic ====
- Macedonian Handball Super League

Winner (2): 2018-19, 2020-21

- Macedonian Handball Cup

Winner (1): 2021
Runner-up (1): 2019

- Macedonian Handball Super Cup

Winner (1): 2019

==== European ====
- EHF Champions League

Winner (1): 2018-19

==== Regional ====
- SEHA League

Winner (1): 2018–19
Runner-up (1): 2019–20

==== International ====
- IHF Super Globe

Third placed (1): 2019

=== RK Eurofarm Pelister ===
==== Domestic ====
- Macedonian Handball Super League

Winner (2): 2022-23, 2023-24
Runner-up (1): 2021-22

- Macedonian Handball Cup

Runner-up (3): 2022, 2023, 2024

- Macedonian Handball Super Cup

Winner (2): 2021, 2022
Runner-up (1): 2023

=== RK Alkaloid ===
==== Domestic ====
- Macedonian Handball Super Cup

Winner (1): 2024

==== European ====
- EHF European Cup

Winner (1): 2024-25

=== Individual ===
- MVP of Round 10 in the Macedonian Handball Super League: 2023
- State Sports Pension (Recognition): 2025
