= Stojanče Stoilov =

Macedonian handball player

Stojance Stoilov
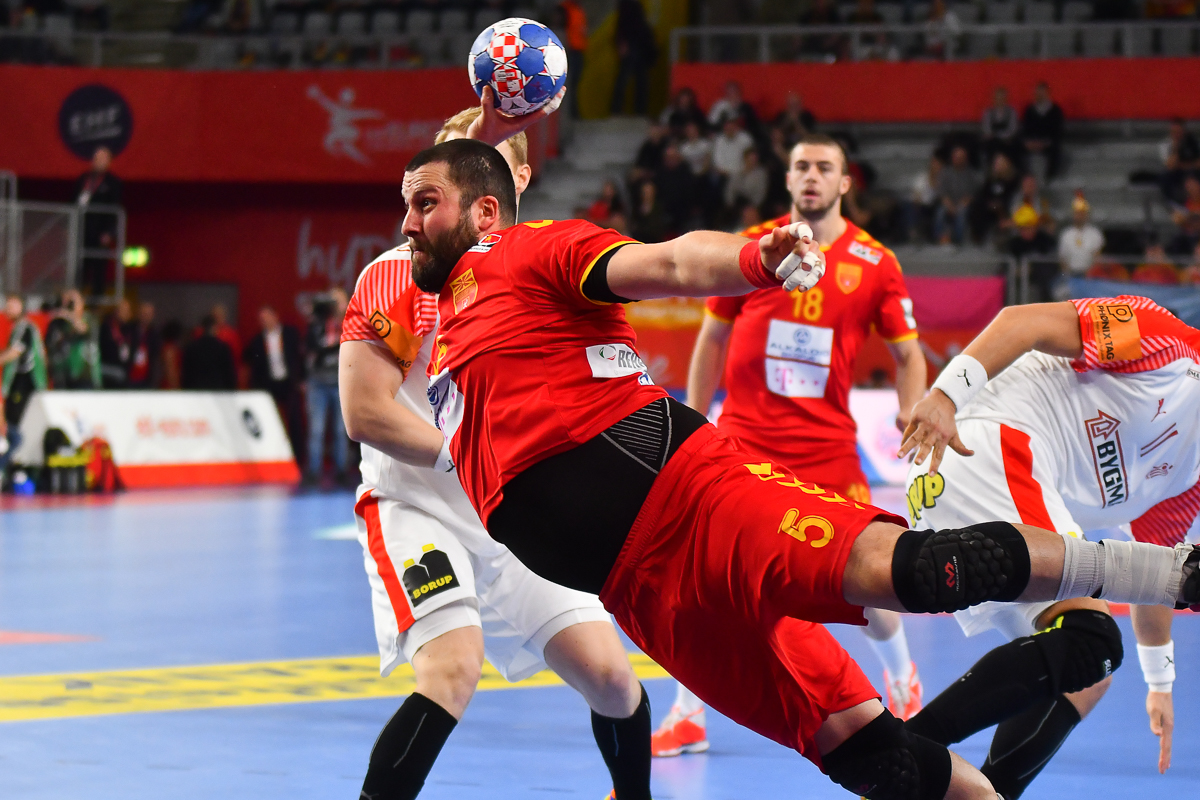

Personal information
- Nationality: Macedonian
- Born: 30 April 1987 (age 39) Skopje, SR Macedonia, SFR Yugoslavia
- Height: 1.91 m (6 ft 3 in)

Sport
- Sport: Handball
- Position: Pivot

Senior clubs
- Years: Team
- 2006–2011: RK Metalurg Skopje
- 2010–2011: → HC Odorheiu Secuiesc
- 2011–2023: RK Vardar 1961
- 2023: RK Vardar 1961
- 2024: RK Vardar 1961
National team
Years	Team	Apps	(Gls)
2007–2022	North Macedonia	68	(143)

Teams managed
- 2023–2024: RK Vardar 1961 (assistant)
- 2024–: North Macedonia (assistant)
- 2024: RK Vardar 1961 (interim)
- 2024–2025: RK Vardar 1961 (assistant)
- 2026–: HC Butel Skopje

Stojanče "Stole" Stoilov (Macedonian: Стојанче Стоилов) (born 30 April 1987) is a retired Macedonian handball player, and current handball coach.

== Honours ==
=== Domestic competitions ===
- Macedonian Handball Super League:

Winner: 2007–08, 2009–10, 2012–13, 2014–15, 2015–16, 2016–17, 2017–18, 2018-19, 2020-21, 2021-22

- Macedonian Handball Cup:

Winner: 2009, 2010, 2012, 2014, 2015, 2016, 2017, 2018, 2021, 2022, 2023

=== European competitions ===
- EHF Champions League

Winner: 2016–17, 2018–19

=== Other competitions ===
- SEHA League:

Winner: 2011–12, 2013–14, 2016–17, 2017–18, 2018–19
