= 2016–17 SEHA League =

2016-17 SEHA League season
- League: SEHA League
- Sport: Handball
- Duration: 30 August 2016 – 16 March 2017
- Games: 90 (regular season); 94 (including F4 tournament)
- Teams: 10; Belarus (1 team); Bosnia and Herzegovina (1 team); Croatia (2 teams); Hungary (1 team); Macedonia (2 teams); Slovakia (1 team); Slovenia (2 teams)

Regular season
- Season champions: (North Macedonia) Vardar
- Season MVP: Blaž Janc
- Top scorer: Blaž Janc (110 goals)

Final Four
- Finals champions: (North Macedonia) Vardar
- Runners-up: (Hungary) Telekom Veszprém
- Finals MVP: Joan Cañellas

SEHA League seasons
- 2015–16 2017–18

The 2016–17 season was the sixth season of the SEHA (South East Handball Association) League and third under the sponsorship of the Russian oil and gas company Gazprom. Ten teams from seven countries (Belarus, Bosnia and Herzegovina, Croatia, Hungary, Macedonia, Slovakia and Slovenia) participated in that year's competition.

Telekom Veszprém were the defending champions. The SEHA League was consisted of two phases – the first has 18 rounds in which all teams play one home and one away game against each other. After that, the four best ranked clubs played on the Final Four tournament.

The campaign began on 30 August 2016 with the match between last year's runner up Vardar and fourth placed Meshkov Brest. The regular season ended on 16 March 2017, with the decisive match between PPD Zagreb and Meshkov Brest.

The Final Four tournament was held in the city of Brest and organised in cooperation with Meshkov Brest, from 7 April to 9 April 2017.

== Team information ==
=== Venues and locations ===
Country	Team	City	Venue (Capacity)
Belarus	Meshkov Brest	Brest	Universal Sports Complex Victoria (3,740)
Bosnia and Herzegovina	Izviđač CO	Ljubuški	Ljubuški Sports Hall (4,000)
Croatia	PPD Zagreb	Zagreb	Arena Zagreb (16,800)
Croatia	Nexe	Našice	Sportska dvorana (2,500)
Hungary	Telekom Veszprém	Veszprém	Veszprém Aréna (5,096)
(North Macedonia) Macedonia	Vardar	Skopje	Jane Sandanski Arena (6,000)
(North Macedonia) Macedonia	Metalurg	Skopje	Avtokomanda Sports Hall (2,000)
Slovakia	Tatran Prešov	Prešov	City Hall Prešov (4,000)
Slovenia	Gorenje Velenje	Velenje	Red Hall (2,500)
Slovenia	Celje Pivovarna Laško	Celje	Zlatorog Arena (5,500)

Location of teams in 2016-17 SEHA League (Bosnia and Herzegovina, Croatia, Macedonia and Slovenia)
Location of teams in 2016-17 SEHA League (Belarus)
Location of teams in 2016-17 SEHA League (Hungary)
Location of teams in 2016-17 SEHA League (Slovakia)

=== Personnel and kits ===
Following is the list of clubs competing in 2016–17 SEHA League, with their manager, team captain, kit manufacturer and shirt sponsor.

Team	Head coach	Team captain	Kit manufacturer	Shirt sponsor (main)
Meshkov Brest	(Ukraine) Serhiy Bebeshko	(Belarus) Dzmitry Nikulenkau	Hummel	BelGazpromBank
Izviđač CO	(Bosnia and Herzegovina) Zdenko Grbavac	(Bosnia and Herzegovina) Ivan Miličević	Hummel	Central Osiguranje
PPD Zagreb	(Croatia) Silvio Ivandija	(Croatia) Zlatko Horvat	Hummel	Prvo Plinarsko Društvo
Nexe	(Croatia) Zdenko Kordi	(Croatia) Marko Mrđenović	Jako	Nexe Grupa
Telekom Veszprém	(Spain) Xavier Sabaté Caviedes	(Hungary) László Nagy	Adidas	Telekom
Vardar	(Spain) Raúl González	(North Macedonia) Stojanče Stoilov	Hummel	Mlekara Zdravje
Metalurg	(Croatia) Lino Červar	(North Macedonia) Filip Kuzmanovski	Kempa	Duferco Makstil
Tatran Prešov	(Czech Republic) Rastislav Trtík	(Slovakia) Radovan Pekár	ATAK Sportswear	Phoenix
Gorenje Velenje	(Slovenia) Marko Šibila	(Slovenia) Niko Medved	Kempa	Gorenje
Celje Pivovarna Laško	(Slovenia) Branko Tamše	(Slovenia) Luka Žvižej	Adidas	Laško

=== Coaching changes ===
Week	Club	Outgoing coach	Date of change	Incoming coach
6th	Gorenje Velenje	(Slovenia) Marko Šibila	3 October 2016	(Slovenia) Borut Plaskan
8th	PPD Zagreb	(Montenegro) Veselin Vujović	17 October 2016	(Croatia) Silvio Ivandija
13th	Nexe	(Croatia) Zdenko Kordi	26 November 2016	(Croatia) Hrvoje Horvat
F4	PPD Zagreb	(Croatia) Silvio Ivandija	3 April 2017	(Croatia) Slavko Goluža

== Regular season ==
=== Standings ===
Pos	Team	Pld	W	D	L	GF	GA	GD	Pts	Qualification
1	(North Macedonia) Vardar	18	15	2	1	599	510	+89	47	Final Four
2	(Hungary) Telekom Veszprém	18	14	2	2	521	458	+63	44	Final Four
3	(Belarus) Meshkov Brest	18	11	2	5	552	500	+52	35	Final Four
4	(Croatia) PPD Zagreb	18	11	1	6	496	469	+27	34	Final Four
5	(Slovenia) Celje Pivovarna Laško	18	11	0	7	561	545	+16	33	
6	(Slovenia) Gorenje Velenje	18	6	0	12	501	520	−19	18	
7	(Croatia) Nexe	18	5	3	10	493	523	−30	18	
8	(North Macedonia) Metalurg	18	5	2	11	453	472	−19	17	
9	(Slovakia) Tatran Prešov	18	4	1	13	469	548	−79	13	
10	(Bosnia and Herzegovina) Izviđač CO	18	1	1	16	503	603	−100	4	

Source: SEHA Standings

=== Results ===
Home \ Away	MES	IZV	ZAG	NEX	VES	VAR	MET	TAT	GOR	CEL
(Belarus) Meshkov Brest		40–29	28–28	37–29	16–19	30–35	31–26	33–25	26–24	36–29
(Bosnia and Herzegovina) Izviđač CO	26–34		26–28	27–30	25–31	27–33	24–24	33–28	32–36	31–32
(Croatia) PPD Zagreb	25–31	34–29		28–22	27–23	28–26	29–20	27–22	28–21	28–27
(Croatia) Nexe	28–27	39–29	23–25		29–29	27–30	27–22	25–31	29–27	26–35
(Hungary) Telekom Veszprém	31–30	36–31	28–25	27–23		28–28	33–21	32–28	36–27	32–25
(North Macedonia) Vardar	34–34	42–30	32–31	37–29	29–22		31–29	38–21	40–32	33–31
(North Macedonia) Metalurg	24–25	36–22	25–22	25–25	20–23	24–25		27–21	28–25	23–25
(Slovakia) Tatran Prešov	25–30	27–25	30–25	29–29	18–26	29–35	27–33		34–30	25–31
(Slovenia) Gorenje Velenje	34–37	31–24	27–26	24–20	27–31	29–31	23–18	30–19		26–27
(Slovenia) Celje Pivovarna Laško	29–27	42–33	29–32	34–33	29–34	29–40	34–28	39–30	34–28	

Legend: Blue = home team win; Yellow = draw; Red = away team win.

== Final four ==
The final four will be held at the Universal Sports Complex Victoria in Brest, Belarus on 7 and 9 April 2017.

== Format ==
The first-placed team of the group faces the fourth-placed team, and the second-placed team will play against the third-placed team from the other group in the final four.

=== Semifinals ===
7 April 2017; 17:30 CEST (UTC+02:00)	Vardar (North Macedonia)	36–28	(Croatia) PPD Zagreb	Universal Sports Complex Victoria, Brest; Attendance: 2,700; Referees: Nabokao, Kulik (BLR)
7 April 2017; 17:30 CEST (UTC+02:00)	Čupić 8	(19–12)	Horvat 8	Universal Sports Complex Victoria, Brest; Attendance: 2,700; Referees: Nabokao, Kulik (BLR)
7 April 2017; 17:30 CEST (UTC+02:00)	2× (yellow card) 7× (suspension)	Report	3× (yellow card) 5× (suspension)	Universal Sports Complex Victoria, Brest; Attendance: 2,700; Referees: Nabokao, Kulik (BLR)

7 April 2017
20:00 CEST (UTC+02:00)
Telekom Veszprém (Hungary)
33–31
(Belarus) Meshkov Brest
Universal Sports Complex Victoria, Brest
Attendance: 3,325
Referees: Mandak, Rudinsky (SVK)
Ilić 7
(14–14)
Stojković 9
3× (yellow card) 4× (suspension)
Report
3× (yellow card) 4× (suspension)

FT: 29–29 Pen: 4-2

=== Match for third place ===
9 April 2017; 17:30 CEST (UTC+02:00)	Meshkov Brest (Belarus)	23–19	(Croatia) Zagreb	Universal Sports Complex Victoria, Brest; Attendance: 3,375; Referees: Nachevski, Nikolov (MKD)
9 April 2017; 17:30 CEST (UTC+02:00)	Stojković 4	(14–10)	Horvat, Marković 5	Universal Sports Complex Victoria, Brest; Attendance: 3,375; Referees: Nachevski, Nikolov (MKD)
9 April 2017; 17:30 CEST (UTC+02:00)	3× (yellow card) 1× (suspension)	Report	3× (yellow card) 2× (suspension)	Universal Sports Complex Victoria, Brest; Attendance: 3,375; Referees: Nachevski, Nikolov (MKD)

=== Final ===
9 April 2017; 20:00 CEST (UTC+02:00)	Vardar (North Macedonia)	26–21	(Hungary) Telekom Veszprém	Universal Sports Complex Victoria, Brest; Attendance: 2,750; Referees: Gubica, Milošević (CRO)
9 April 2017; 20:00 CEST (UTC+02:00)	Cañellas, Dibirov 5	(11–11)	Ilić 5	Universal Sports Complex Victoria, Brest; Attendance: 2,750; Referees: Gubica, Milošević (CRO)
9 April 2017; 20:00 CEST (UTC+02:00)	3× (yellow card) 4× (suspension)	Report	3× (yellow card) 4× (suspension)	Universal Sports Complex Victoria, Brest; Attendance: 2,750; Referees: Gubica, Milošević (CRO)
