= Nikola Stojčevski =

Macedonian handball player (born 1984)

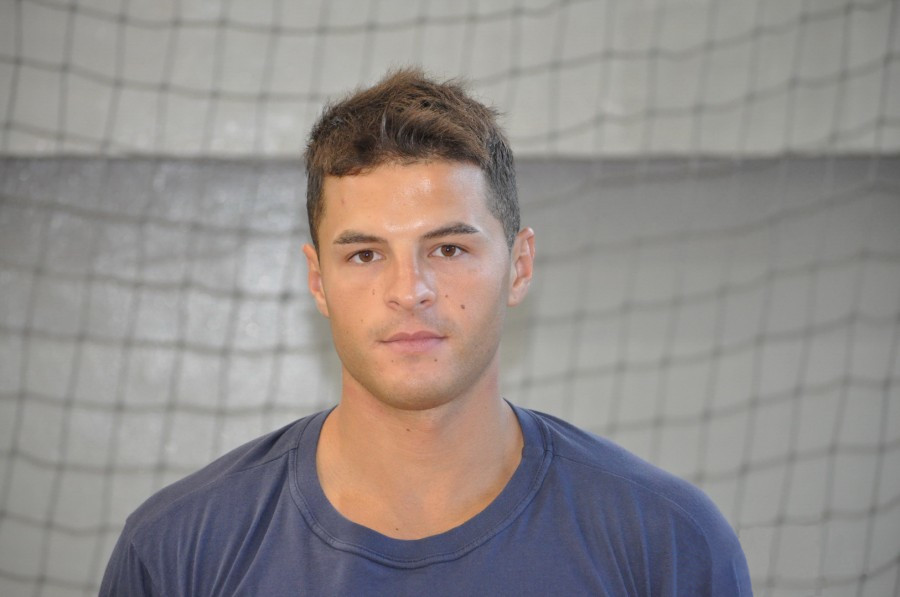

Personal information
- Nationality: Macedonian
- Born: 9 August 1984 (age 42) Resen, Macedonia
- Height: 1.84 m (6 ft 0 in)

Sport
- Sport: Handball
- Position: Central back

Senior clubs
- Years: Team
- 2003-2005: (North Macedonia) RK Prespa
- 2005-2008: (North Macedonia) RK Vardar PRO
- 2008-2009: (Croatia) RK Osijek
- 2009-2010: (Romania) Cluj Napoca
- 2010: (Romania) Pandurii Târgu Jiu
- 2010-2012: (North Macedonia) RK Metalurg Skopje
- 2012-2013: (Tunisia) Club Africain
- 2013-2015: (Sweden) Redbergslids IK
- 2015-2016: (Sweden) HK Drott
- 2016-2017: (Germany) TuS Ferndorf
National team
Years	Team	Apps	(Gls)
–	Macedonia	24	(33)

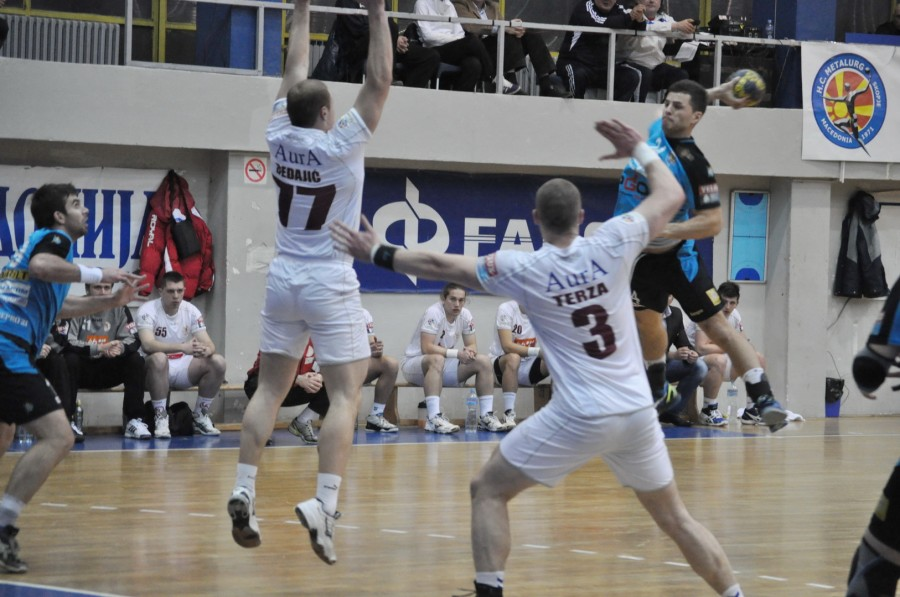
RK Metalurg - Bosna Sarajevo

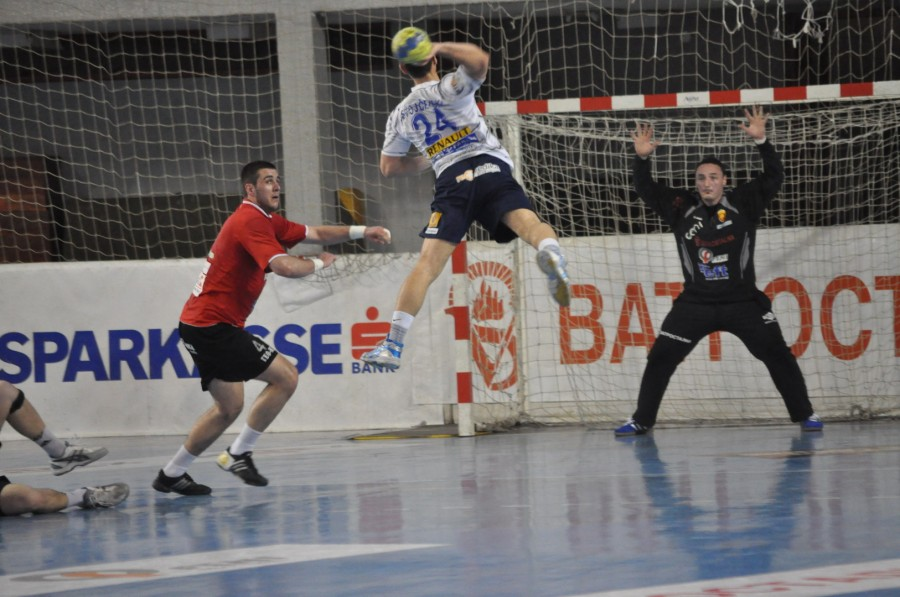
RK Metalurg - Vardar Pro

Nikola Stojčevski (Macedonian: Никола Стојчевски; born 9 August 1984) is a retired Macedonian handball player.
