= Miłosz Wałach =

Polish handball player (born 2001)

Personal information
- Nationality: Polish
- Born: 23 November 2001 (age 24) Pruchnik, Poland
- Height: 1.95 m (6 ft 5 in)

Sport
- Sport: Handball
- Position: Goalkeeper
- Current club: RK Vardar 1961
- Number: 25

Youth career
- Years: Team
- –: Jedynka Pruchnik
- –: Juvenia Rzeszów
- –2020: Vive Kielce

Senior clubs
- Years: Team
- 2020–2025: Industria Kielce
- 2021–2023: → Torus Wybrzeże Gdańsk (loan)
- 2025–: RK Vardar 1961
National team
Years	Team	Apps	(Gls)
2021–	Poland	4	(0)
- Updated on 10 August 2025

Miłosz Wałach (born 23 November 2001) is a Polish handball player for RK Vardar 1961 and the Polish national team.

== Honours ==
- Macedonian Handball Super League (North Macedonia)

Winner Gold :2026

- Macedonian Cup (North Macedonia)

Winner Gold : 2026
