= Patryk Walczak =

Polish handball player (born 1992)

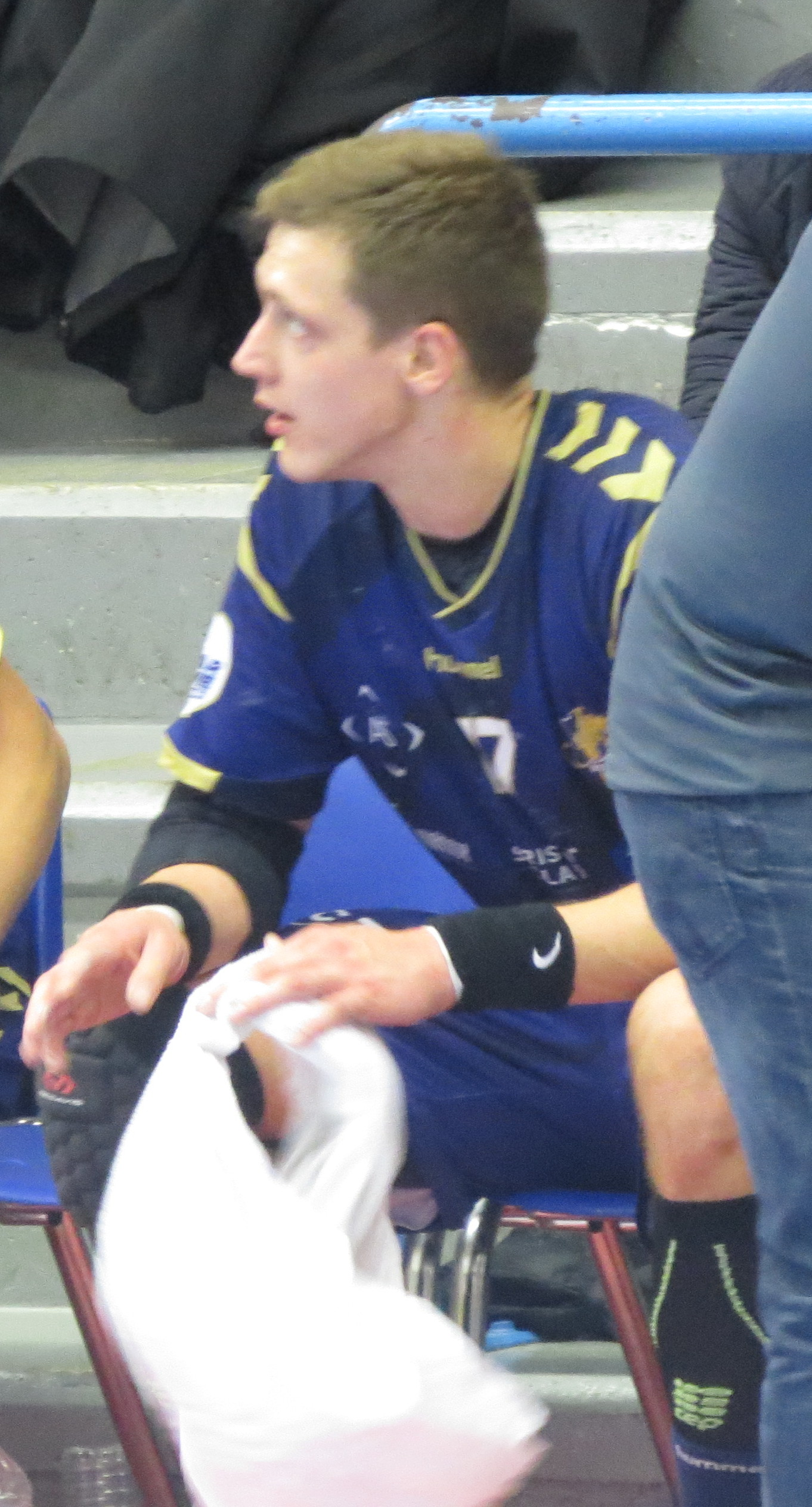

Personal information
- Nationality: Polish
- Born: 29 July 1992 (age 34) Szczecin, Poland
- Height: 1.98 m (6 ft 6 in)

Sport
- Sport: Handball
- Position: Pivot
- Current club: RK Zagreb
- Number: 7

Senior clubs
- Years: Team
- 2008–2011: SMS Gdańsk
- 2011–2016: Pogoń Szczecin
- 2016–2018: PGE Vive Kielce
- 2017–2018: → Massy Essonne HB (loan)
- 2018–2020: TuS N-Lübbecke
- 2020–2022: RK Vardar 1961
- 2022–2023: Sporting CP
- 2023–: RK Zagreb
National team
Years	Team	Apps	(Gls)
2017–2024	Poland	39	(27)

Patryk Walczak (born 29 July 1992) is a Polish handball player who plays for RK Zagreb.

He participated at the 2017 World Men's Handball Championship.

== Honors ==
- Macedonian Handball Super League

Winner: 2021, 2022

- Macedonian Handball Cup

Winner: 2021, 2022

- Portuguese Handball Cup

Winner: 2023
