= Dejan Milosavljev =

Serbian handball player (born 1996)

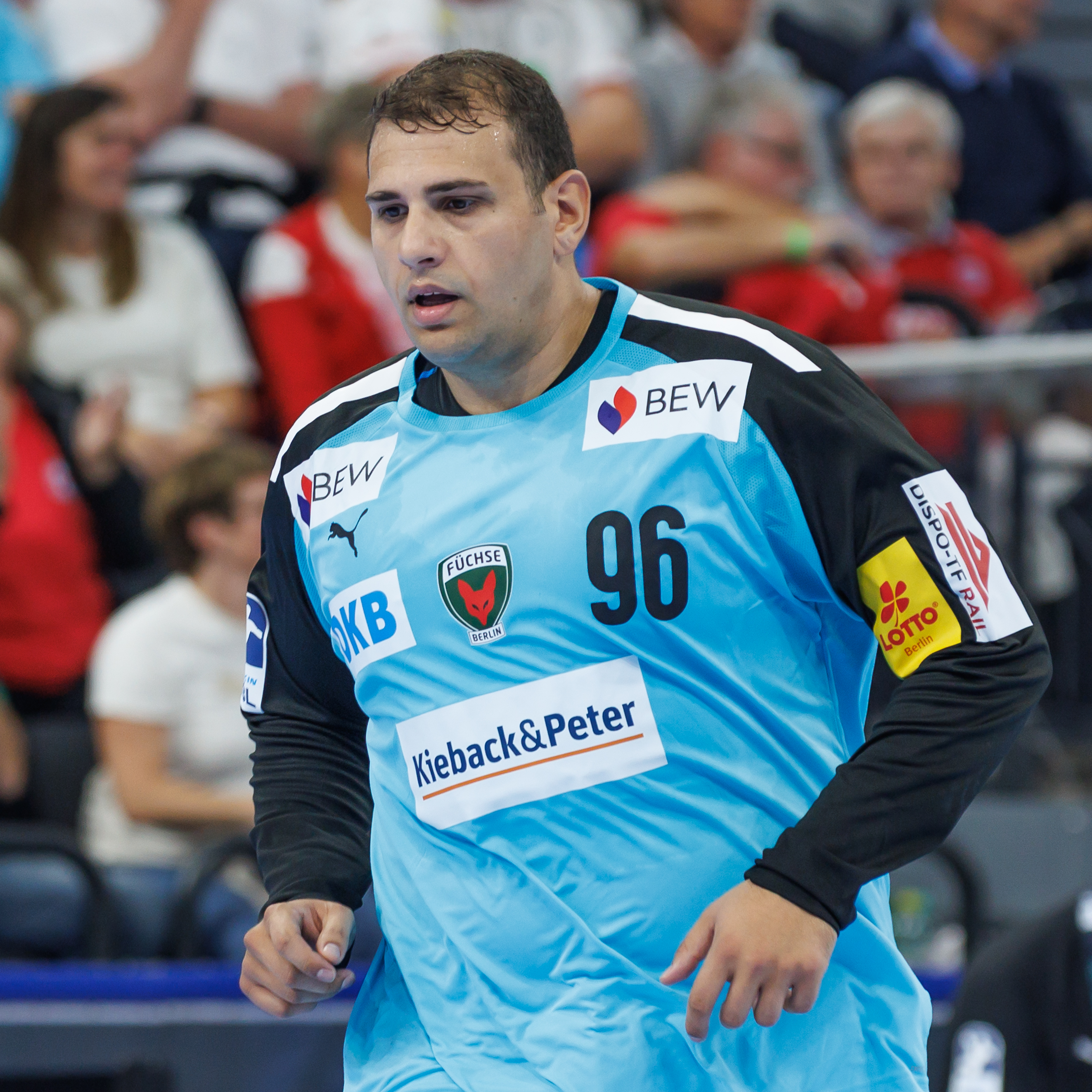
- Milosavljev in 2025

Personal information
- Full name: Dejan Milosavljev
- Nationality: Serbian
- Born: 16 March 1996 (age 30) Pančevo, Serbia, FR Yugoslavia
- Height: 1.96 m (6 ft 5 in)

Sport
- Sport: Handball
- Position: Goalkeeper
- Current club: Industria Kielce
- Number: 96

Youth career
- Years: Team
- –: Dolovo
- –: RK Jugović

Senior clubs
- Years: Team
- 2011–2017: RK Jugović
- 2017–2018: RK Partizan
- 2017: → Lekhwiya (loan)
- 2018–2019: RK Vardar
- 2019–2026: Füchse Berlin
- 2026–: Industria Kielce
National team
Years	Team	Apps	(Gls)
2014–	Serbia	74	(3)
- Updated on 15 January 2026

Dejan Milosavljev (Serbian Cyrillic: Дејан Милосављев; born 16 March 1996) is a Serbian handball player for Füchse Berlin and the Serbia national team.

== Career ==
Milosavljev made his debut for Jugović in the 2011–12 season. He was transferred to Partizan in March 2017. As part of the deal, it was agreed that Milosavljev would initially go on loan to Qatari club Lekhwiya.

He helped them win the Amir Cup, before returning to Partizan. In July 2018, Milosavljev signed with Macedonian champions Vardar. With Vardar he won the Macedonian Championship, the 2018–19 SEHA League and the 2018-19 EHF Champions League.

For the 2019-2020 season he joined Füchse Berlin. With Füchse he won the 2024-25 Handball-Bundesliga, which was the first in club history. The same season he played in the 2024-25 EHF Champions League final, where Füchse lost to league rivals SC Magdeburg.

A Serbia international since 2014, Milosavljev participated in the 2019 World Men's Handball Championship, where Serbia finished 18th.

== Honours ==
Vardar

- Macedonian Handball Super League: 2018–19
- EHF Champions League: 2018–19
- SEHA League: 2018–19

Füchse Berlin

- EHF European League: 2022–23
- Handball-Bundesliga: 2024-25
- DHB-Supercup: 2024
