= Mihajlo Mihajlovski =

Macedonian handball officer

Mihajlo Mihajlovski (Macedonian: Михајло Михајловски) is the current chairman of RK Vardar. In 2008, he was re-elected as the commissioner of the Macedonian Handball Federation.
