= RK Vardar =

Macedonian handball team based in Skopje

РК Вардар 1961 (North Macedonia) HC Vardar
- Full name: Rakometen klub Vardar 1961
- Short name: Vardar
- Founded: 1961; 65 years ago in Skopje
- Arena: Jane Sandanski Arena
- Capacity: 6.000
- President: Mihajlo Mihajlovski
- Head coach: Ivan Čupić
- League: Macedonian Super League; Regional League
- 2025-26: Macedonian Super League, 1st
- Club colours
Home	Away

RK Vardar 1961 (Macedonian: РК Вардар 1961) is a professional handball club from Skopje, Macedonia. Vardar is the most successful handball team in the country, having won 16-sixteen national League titles and 18-eighteen League Cup titles. Vardar is also the most successful team in the regional SEHA League, having won five titles and two EHF Champions League titles.

== History ==
RK Vardar was founded in 1961 as a part of the Vardar Sports Club in Skopje, which was founded in 1947.

The RK Grafichar Skopje club was established in 1948, and second only to HC Rabotnichki. In 1961, Grafichar was renamed Vardar, and almost all members of RK Partizan Skopje joined the team. The emergence of the ambitious Vardar team presented a challenge to HC Rabotnichki, which was no longer the strong first-league team from the past. Early members of Vardar include goalkeeper Jovanovski, as well as Atanasovski, Zdravkovski, Savevski and Bozinovski. Vardar joined the Yugoslav Handball Championship in 1976 where played for 2 seasons. In the 1980s they spent most of the time in the second division.

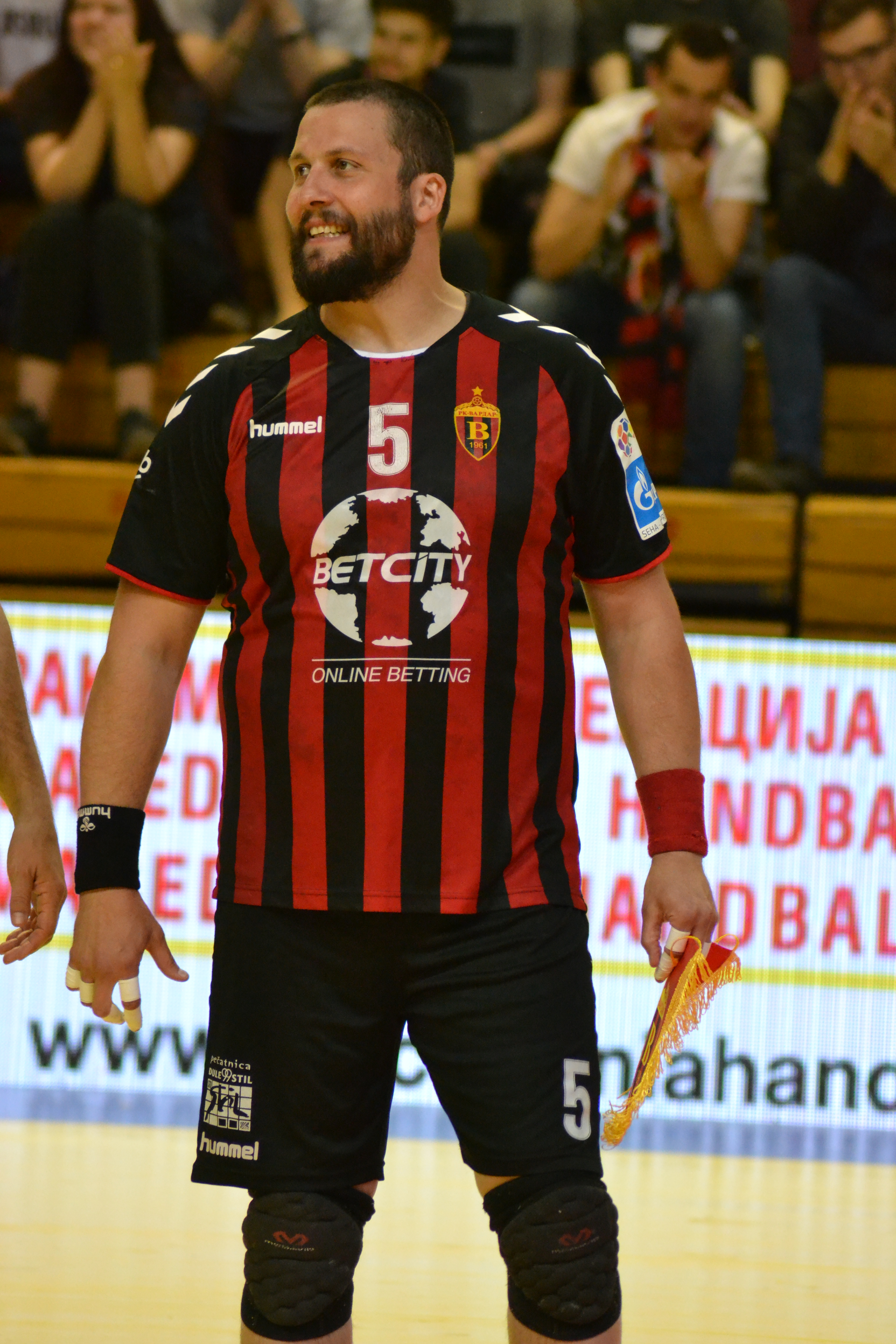
Stojan Stoilov the Captain goal machine

The handball team rose to power again in the late 1990s, becoming one of two clubs, alongside RK Pelister, to dominate the Macedonian handball scene after the independence of the country. Vardar has participated in the EHF Champions League eleven times and made it to the semifinals of the Cup Winner's Cup three times. The club achieved either championship or runner-up status in the Macedonian Super League every since 1999, with the exception of 2005, where they finished 4th. In 2018 they became the most winning team in the Macedonian handball championship by winning their twelfth title. They are also the record cup winner with thirteen titles. On April 15, 2012, Vardar defeated Metalurg at the Zagreb Arena to become the first SEHA League champion. The team has won five titles in the SEHA League. The club started the new 2013–14 season with a new management structure, with Sergey Samsonenko as the new proprietor and sports director of the club, and Mihajlo Mihajlovski as the honorary club chairman.

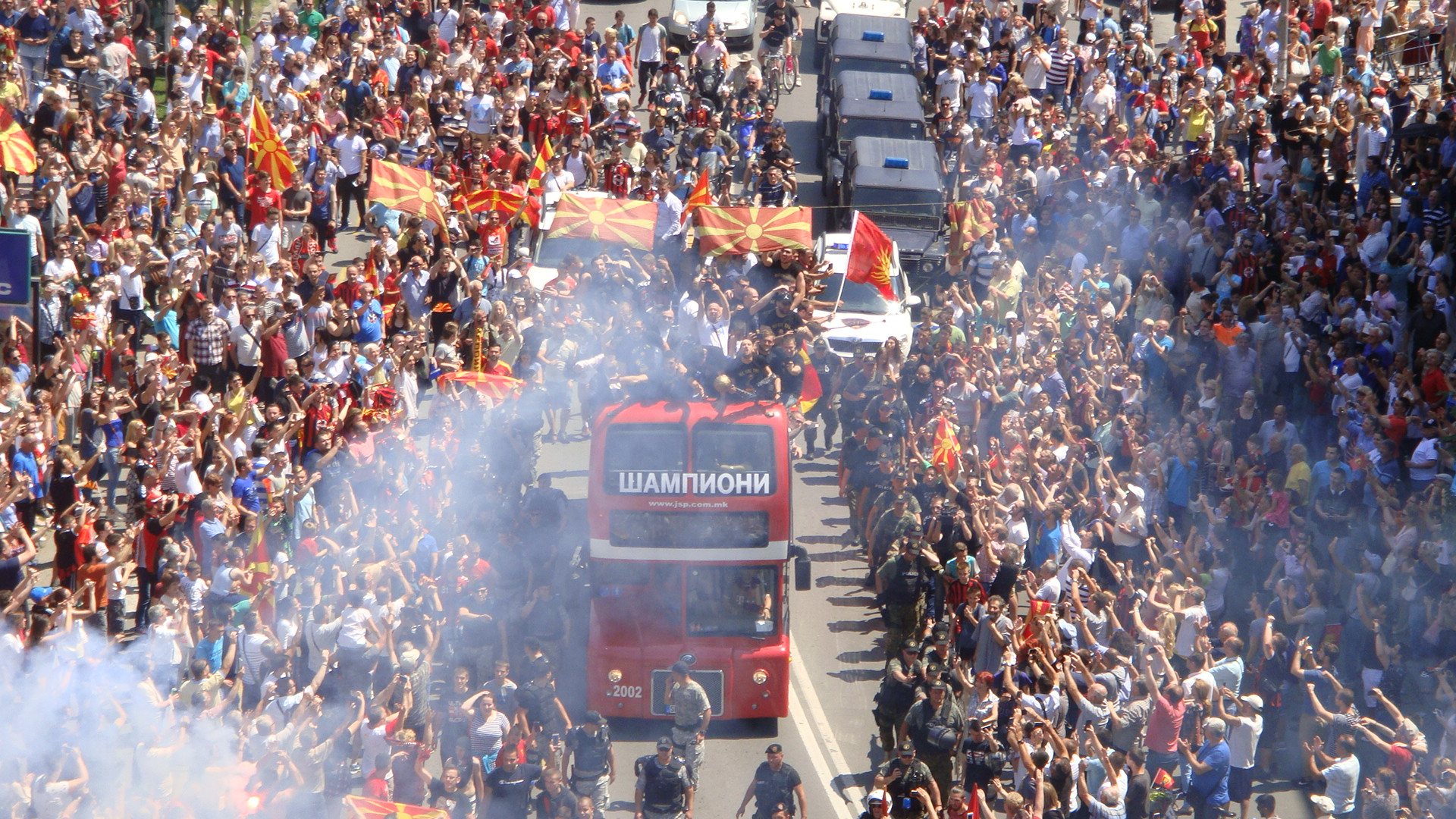
The welcoming ceremony after winning 2016–17 EHF Champions League

The 2016–17 season was the most successful for the team, as they won the EHF Champions League and the regional SEHA League, the two main domestic championships, the national Handball Super League, and the national Handball Cup. Two days after winning the EHF Champions League, the team celebrated the victory with approximately 150,000 people in a ceremony in Macedonia Square in Skopje. Because of the huge success the current President of the Republic of Macedonia, Gjorgje Ivanov awarded the members of the handball club Vardar a Medal of Merit for the Republic of Macedonia for the results they achieved, especially for winning the Champions League title. The club was awarded the national charter of the country.

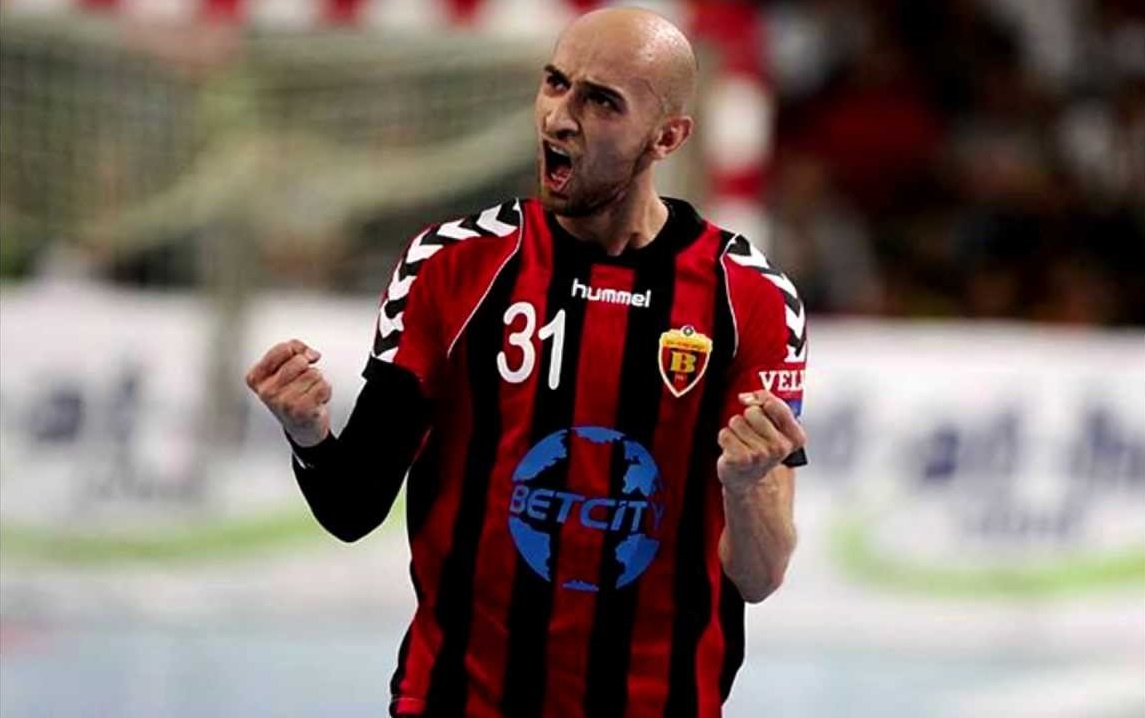
Legendary Winger Timur Dibirov

In the 2018–19 season, the team won the EHF Champions League, the regional SEHA League and the main domestic championship, the Handball Super League of North Macedonia. One day after winning the EHF Champions League, the team arrived in the country with a private jet and celebrated the victory with approximately 250,000 people in a central ceremony at Macedonia Square in Skopje.

== Kits ==
HOME
2014–16	2017–19

AWAY
2015-17	2017-19	2019-21	2021-22	2022-23	2023–24

== Accomplishments ==
=== Domestic competitions ===
Macedonian League

- Macedonian Republic League

Winner:(3) 1959, 1960, 1975

- Macedonian Handball Super League

Winner (16): 1998–99, 2000–01, 2001–02, 2002–03, 2003–04, 2006–07, 2008–09, 2012–13, 2014–15, 2015–16, 2016–17, 2017–18, 2018–19, 2020–21, 2021–22, 2025–26

- Macedonian Handball Cup

Winner (18): 1997, 2000, 2001, 2003, 2004, 2007, 2008, 2012, 2014, 2015, 2016, 2017, 2018, 2021, 2022, 2023, 2025, 2026

- Macedonian Handball Super Cup

Winner (5): 2017, 2018, 2019, 2023, 2026

=== European competitions ===
- EHF Champions League

Winner (2): 2016–17, 2018–19

- EHF Cup Winners' Cup

Third placed: 1998–99, 2004–05, 2010–11

=== Other competitions ===
- SEHA League

Winner (5): 2011–12, 2013–14, 2016–17, 2017–18, 2018–19
Runner-up: 2012–13, 2015–16, 2019–20

- IHF Super Globe

Third placed: 2017, 2019

=== Individual club awards ===
- Double

Winners (10): 2000–01, 2002–03, 2003–04, 2006–07, 2014–15, 2015–16, 2016–17, 2017–18, 2020–21, 2025–26

- Triple Crown

Winners (1): 2016–17

== Arena ==
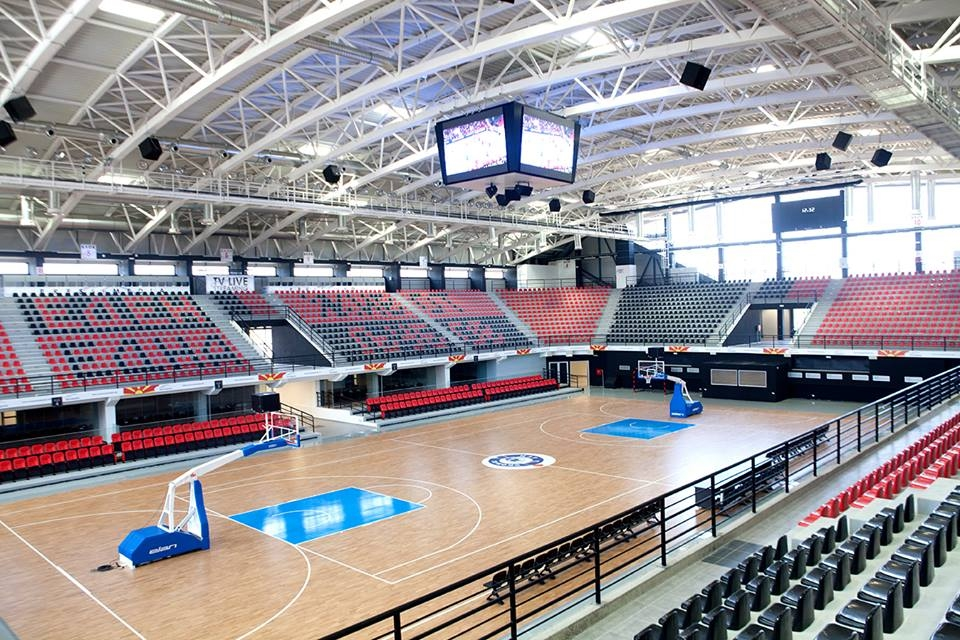

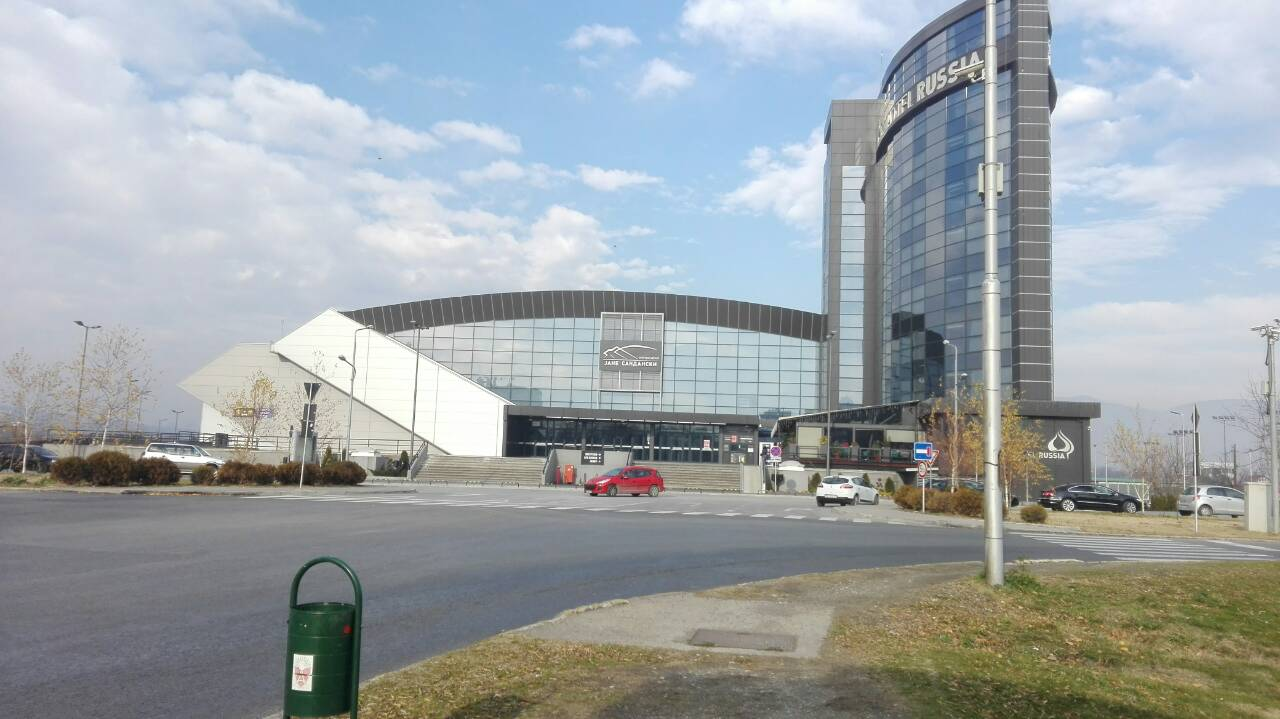
Sandanski Arena Hotel and Spa

Sergey Samsonenko is the owner of the Jane Sandanski Arena where RK Vardar 1961 play all their home matches in the EHF Champions League and in domestic competitions. It's a modern complex with a sports hall of 7.500 capacity. It has its own hotel, spa center, hospital and swimming pool. The arena is named after the Macedonian revolutionary Jane Sandanski.

== Team ==
=== Current squad ===
Squad for the 2026–2027 season

Goalkeepers

- 12 (Poland) Miłosz Wałach
- 33 (Serbia) Milan Bomaštar
- 99 (North Macedonia) Vasil Gogov

Left Wingers

- 2 (North Macedonia) Mario Stojanovski
- 10 (France) Mahamadou Keïta
- 23 (France) Junior Tuzolana

Right Wingers

- 3 (Serbia) Vukašin Vorkapić
- 9 (North Macedonia) Goce Georgievski (c)
- 11 (North Macedonia) Boban Popovski

Line players

- 18 (North Macedonia) Milan Lazarevski
- 27 (North Macedonia) Kristijan Anastasovski
- 78 (Poland) Wiktor Jankowski

Left Backs

- 15 (Croatia) Leon Ljevar
- 34 (Brazil) João Pedro Silva
- 77 (North Macedonia) Marko Gjorcheski

Central Backs

- 14 (North Macedonia) Nikola Nechovski
- 66 (Slovenia) Jaka Malus
- 93 (France) Mattéo Fadhuile

Right Backs

- 13 (Serbia) Uroš Mitrović
- 48 (Egypt) Mohab Abdelhak

=== Transfers ===
Transfers for the 2027–28 season

Joining

Leaving

- (Slovenia) Jaka Malus (CB) (to (Switzerland) HC Kriens-Luzern) ?

=== Transfer History ===
Transfers for the 2026–27 season

Joining

- (Serbia) Milan Bomaštar (GK) from (France) C' Chartres MHB
- (Egypt) Mohab Abdelhak (RB) from (Germany) THW Kiel
- (Croatia) Leon Ljevar (LB) from (Slovenia) RD Slovan
- (Serbia) Aljoša Damjanović (CB) from (Serbia) RK Partizan ?
- (France) Mattéo Fadhuile (CB) from (France) Tremblay Handball
- (North Macedonia) Marko Gjorcheski (LB) (from (North Macedonia) RK Tineks Prolet)
- (North Macedonia) Boban Popovski (RW) (from (North Macedonia) RK Multi Essence)

Leaving

- (North Macedonia) Dmytro Horiha (LB) to (Hungary) OTP Bank-Pick Szeged
- (Argentina) Nicolás Bono (CB) to (France) Fenix Toulouse Handball
- (Poland) Marek Marciniak (RW) to (Poland) Śląsk Wrocław
- (Portugal) Miguel Espinha Ferreira (GK) to (Turkey) Beşiktaş JK
- (Portugal) Miguel Pinto (RW) to (Spain) BM Rebi Cuenca
- (Japan) Haruki Kawada (CB) to (France) Caen Handball
- (North Macedonia) Mario Tankoski (CB) to (North Macedonia) RK Struga
- (North Macedonia) Marko Bogdanovski (GK) to (North Macedonia) HC Butel Skopje
- (North Macedonia) Kristijan Stamenković (RB) to (North Macedonia) HC Butel Skopje

Transfers for the 2025–26 season

Joining

- (Serbia) Uroš Mitrović (RB) from (France) Fenix Toulouse Handball
- (Serbia) Vukašin Vorkapić (RW) (from (Serbia) RK Vojvodina)
- (Argentina) Nicolás Bono (CB) from (France) Istres Provence Handball
- (Poland) Miłosz Wałach (GK) from (Poland) Industria Kielce
- (Poland) Marek Marciniak (RW) from (Poland) KS Azoty-Puławy
- (Poland) Wiktor Jankowski (LP) from (Poland) MMTS Kwidzyn
- (France) Mahamadou Keïta (LW) from (Spain) Ángel Ximénez Puente Genil
- (France) Junior Tuzolana (LW) from (France) Cesson Rennes MHB
- (Slovenia) Jaka Malus (CB) from (Slovenia) RD Slovan
- (Japan) Haruki Kawada (CB) from (Japan) University of Tsukuba
- (Brazil) João Pedro Silva (CB) from (Serbia) RK Vojvodina
- (North Macedonia) Filip Taleski (LB) from (Portugal) S.L. Benfica
- (North Macedonia) Kristijan Anastasovski (LP) from (North Macedonia) GRK Tikveš

Leaving

- (Serbia) Marko Srdanović (LW) to (Serbia) RK Vojvodina
- (Serbia) Stefan Petrić (LB) to (North Macedonia) GRK Ohrid
- (Serbia) Matija Nikolić (CB) to (Serbia) RK Vojvodina
- (Serbia) Mladen Krsmančić (CB) to (North Macedonia) GRK Ohrid
- (Portugal) Nilton Melo (LB) to (France) Caen Handball
- (Montenegro) Vuko Borozan (LB) to (North Macedonia) GRK Ohrid
- (Cuba) Hanser Rodríguez (LW) to (France) Caen Handball
- (Tunisia) Achraf Margheli (RB) to (Tunisia) Espérance
- (Netherlands) Lars Kooij (LP) to (Germany) Bergischer HC
- (North Macedonia) Alen Kjosevski (RW) to (North Macedonia) GRK Ohrid
- (North Macedonia) Mihail Alarov (LP) to (North Macedonia) RK Alkaloid
- (North Macedonia) Tomče Stojanovski (LB) to (North Macedonia) GRK Tikveš
- (North Macedonia) Tomislav Jagurinovski (RB) to (Germany) Dessau-Roßlauer HV
- (North Macedonia) Filip Taleski (LB) to (Hungary) MOL Tatabánya KC

=== Staff ===
==== Professional staff ====
Position	Name
Head coach	(Croatia) Ivan Čupić
Assistant coach	(Croatia) Tomislav Čupić
Goalkeeper Coach	(Croatia) Mario Kelentrić
Conditioning coach	(North Macedonia) Matej Jovanovski
Physiotherapists	(North Macedonia) Rubincho Srbinoski (North Macedonia) Nikolina Bojadjiska

==== Management ====
Position	Name
Owner	(North Macedonia) Mihajlo Mihajlovski
President	(North Macedonia) Mihajlo Mihajlovski
Executive director	
Chairperson of the NEDs	(North Macedonia) Emil Ugrinovski

=== Former club members ===
==== Notable former players ====
- (North Macedonia) Stojanče Stoilov
- (North Macedonia) Pepi Manaskov
- (North Macedonia) Stevče Aluševski
- (North Macedonia) Petar Misovski
- (North Macedonia) Branislav Angelovski
- (North Macedonia) Kiril Kolev
- (North Macedonia) Vančo Dimovski
- (North Macedonia) Lazo Majnov
- (North Macedonia) Naumče Mojsovski
- (North Macedonia) Zlatko Mojsovski
- (North Macedonia) Goran Kuzmanoski
- (North Macedonia) Dejan Pecakovski
- (North Macedonia) Radoslav Stojanović
- (North Macedonia) Aco Jonovski
- (North Macedonia) Marjan Kolev
- (North Macedonia) Mitko Stoilov
- (North Macedonia) Vlado Nedanovski
- (North Macedonia) Martin Popovski
- (North Macedonia) Marko Kizikj
- (North Macedonia) Dimitar Dimitrioski
- (North Macedonia) Zlatko Daskalovski
- (North Macedonia) Nemanja Pribak
- (North Macedonia) Filip Lazarov
- (North Macedonia) Velko Markoski
- (North Macedonia) Milorad Kukoski
- (North Macedonia) Gradimir Čanevski
- (North Macedonia) Petar Angelov
- (North Macedonia) Goce Ojleski
- (North Macedonia) Nikola Markoski
- (North Macedonia) Milan Levov
- (North Macedonia) Nikola Mitrevski
- (North Macedonia) Daniel Gjorgjeski
- (North Macedonia) Nikola Stojčevski
- (North Macedonia) Dejan Manaskov
- (North Macedonia) Borko Ristovski
- (North Macedonia) Filip Taleski
- (North Macedonia) Martin Tomovski
- (North Macedonia) Tomislav Jagurinovski
- (North Macedonia) Mihail Alarov
- (Russia) Alexey Rastvortsev
- (Russia) Mikhail Chipurin
- (Russia) Alexander Dereven
- (Russia) Dmitrii Kiselev
- (Russia) Pavel Atman
- (Russia) Daniil Shishkarev
- (Russia) Sergei Gorbok
- (Russia) Gleb Kalarash
- (Russia) Timur Dibirov
- (Serbia) Strahinja Milić
- (Serbia) Ilija Abutović
- (Serbia) Mijajlo Marsenić
- (Serbia) Dejan Milosavljev
- (Serbia) Marko Vujin
- (Serbia) Vladimir Petrić
- (Serbia) Alem Toskić
- (Spain) Iñaki Malumbres Aldave
- (Spain) Alex Dujshebaev
- (Spain) Arpad Šterbik
- (Spain) Joan Cañellas
- (Spain) Jorge Maqueda
- (Croatia) Blaženko Lacković
- (Croatia) Luka Cindrić
- (Croatia) Igor Karačić
- (Croatia) Ivan Čupić
- (Croatia) Lovro Jotić
- (Montenegro) Mladen Rakčević
- (Montenegro) Stevan Vujović
- (Montenegro) Vuk Lazović
- (Montenegro) Vasko Ševaljević
- (Montenegro) Andrej Dobrković
- (Montenegro) Vuko Borozan
- (Slovenia) Miladin Kozlina
- (Slovenia) Matjaž Brumen
- (Slovenia) Gregor Ocvirk
- (Slovenia) Staš Skube
- (Slovenia) Domen Sikošek Pelko
- (Georgia (country)) Revaz Chanturia
- (Czech Republic) Jan Sobol
- (Brazil) Rogerio Moraes Ferreira
- (Brazil) José Toledo
- (Brazil) Leonardo Dutra
- (Latvia) Dainis Krištopāns
- (Algeria) Khalifa Ghedbane
- (France) Robin Cantegrel
- (France) Bakary Diallo
- (France) Jérémy Toto
- (Germany) Christian Dissinger
- (Poland) Patryk Walczak
- (Poland) Jan Czuwara
- (Netherlands) Lars Kooij
- (Cuba) Yoel Cuni Morales
- (Cuba) Hanser Rodriguez
- (Portugal) Nilton Melo
- (Democratic Republic of the Congo) Olivier Nyokas
- (Democratic Republic of the Congo) Kévynn Nyokas
- (Japan) Kosuke Yasuhira

==== Notable former coaches ====
- (North Macedonia) Ljubomir Savevski
- (North Macedonia) Andon Boškovski
- (North Macedonia) Zoran Kastratović
- (North Macedonia) Stevče Aluševski
- (North Macedonia) Vlado Nedanovski
- (Serbia) Dragan Đukić
- (Serbia) Dejan Perić
- (Montenegro) Veselin Vujović
- (Spain) Raúl González Gutiérrez
- (Spain) David Davis
- (Spain) Roberto García Parrondo
- (Spain) David Pisonero
- (Argentina) Guillermo Milano

==== Notable former presidents ====
- (Russia) Sergey Samsonenko
- (North Macedonia) Mihajlo Mihajlovski

== European competitions record ==
=== EHF Champions League ===
Season	Round	Club	Home	Away	Aggregate:
1999–00	1/16	(Switzerland) TV Suhr Handball	33–37	26–30	59–67
2001–02	R 2	(Turkey) ASKI Ankara	37–31	27–28	64–59
2001–02	GM (Group D)	(Hungary) Fotex KC Veszprém	24–27	22–27	3rd
2001–02	GM (Group D)	(Germany) Sportclub Magdeburg	27–27	19–33	3rd
2001–02	GM (Group D)	(France) S. O. Chambery	32–30	28–31	3rd
2002–03	QR 1	(Belgium) HC Eynatten G.o.E.	32–24	31–28	63–52
2002–03	QR 2	(Norway) Sandefjord TIF	29–23	26–26	55–49
2002–03	GM (Group D)	(Croatia) RK Zagreb	25–28	25–30	4th
2002–03	GM (Group D)	(Germany) THW Kiel	27–26	23–34	4th
2002–03	GM (Group D)	(Romania) "Fibrexnylon" Savinesti	26–25	26–38	4th
2003–04
2003–04	GM (Group B)	(Germany) Sportclub Magdeburg	28–30	24–38	4th
2003–04	GM (Group B)	(Spain) FC Barcelona	27–35	19–41	4th
2003–04	GM (Group B)	(Iceland) Haukar Hafnarfjördur	26–32	33–34	4th
2004–05
2004–05	GM (Group A)	(Spain) FC Barcelona	12–26	22–31	3rd
2004–05	GM (Group A)	(Hungary) SC Pick Szeged	24–24	18–25	3rd
2004–05	GM (Group A)	(Romania) HCM Constanta	22–22	26–25	3rd
2007–08	QR 1	(Estonia) Pölva Serviti	37–22	30–30	67–52
2007–08	GM (Group C)	(Switzerland) Kadetten Schaffhausen GCZ	27–26	30–36	4th
2007–08	GM (Group C)	HC Croatia Osiguranje-Zagreb	26–34	28–28	4th
2007–08	GM (Group C)	(Spain) C.BM. Ademar Leon	29–28	21–28	4th
2009–10	Q (Group 1)	(Turkey) Besiktas JK	33–30		1st
2009–10	Q (Group 1)	(Montenegro) HC Buducnost Podgorica	35–28		1st
2009–10	Q (Group 1)	(Belarus) HC Dinamo-Minsk	34–24		1st
2009–10	GP (Group D)	(Denmark) KIF Kolding	25–32	21–28	5th
2009–10	GP (Group D)	(Spain) Reale Ademar	24–31	28–37	5th
2009–10	GP (Group D)	(Germany) THW Kiel	23–33	23–39	5th
2009–10	GP (Group D)	(Switzerland) GC Amicitia Zürich	22–22	31–24	5th
2009–10	GP (Group D)	(Spain) F.C. Barcelona Borges	28–35	28–35	5th
2013–14	GP (Group C)	(Spain) FC Barcelona	29–29	23–30	4th
2013–14	GP (Group C)	(Belarus) HC Dinamo Minsk	30–22	24–26	4th
2013–14	GP (Group C)	(France) PSG Handball	24–24	25–35	4th
2013–14	GP (Group C)	(Switzerland) Wacker Thun	32–25	37–24	4th
2013–14	GP (Group C)	(North Macedonia) HC Metalurg	18–26	27–22	4th
2013–14	L16	(Germany) HSV Hamburg	28–28	30–29	58–57
2013–14	QF	(Germany) SG Flensburg-Handewitt	27–25	22–24	49–49
2014–15	GP (Group C)	(Slovenia) RK Celje Pivovarna Lasko	34–32	27–26	2nd
2014–15	GP (Group C)	(Russia) Chekhovskie Medvedi	39–28	39–34	2nd
2014–15	GP (Group C)	(Germany) Rhein-Neckar Löwen	28–25	35–28	2nd
2014–15	GP (Group C)	(France) Montpellier Agglomération Handball	30–26	34–34	2nd
2014–15	GP (Group C)	(Hungary) MKB-MVM Veszprém	23–24	24–32	2nd
2014–15	L16	(Poland) Orlen Wisla Plock	31–20	26–32	57–52
2014–15	QF	(Poland) KS Vive Tauron Kielce	20–22	31–33	51–55
2015–16	GP (Group B)	(France) Montpellier HB	34–26	30–25	3rd
2015–16	GP (Group B)	(Hungary) MOL-Pick Szeged	27–23	31–29	3rd
2015–16	GP (Group B)	(Sweden) IFK Kristianstad	38–36	30–25	3rd
2015–16	GP (Group B)	(Germany) Rhein-Neckar Löwen	25–19	27–28	3rd
2015–16	GP (Group B)	(Denmark) KIF Kolding Kobenhavn	34–24	31–33	3rd
2015–16	GP (Group B)	(Poland) KS Vive Tauron Kielce	34–24	20–23	3rd
2015–16	GP (Group B)	(Spain) FC Barcelona Lassa	25–27	30–31	3rd
2015–16	L16	(Poland) Orlen Wisla Plock	25–24	30–30	55–54
2015–16	QF	(Hungary) MVM Veszprém	26–29	30–30	56–59
2016–17	GP (Group B)	(Sweden) IFK Kristianstad	32–29	28–23	1st
2016–17	GP (Group B)	(Belarus) HC Meshkov Brest	31–27	26–30	1st
2016–17	GP (Group B)	(Slovenia) RK Celje Pivovarna Lasko	35–30	32–26	1st
2016–17	GP (Group B)	(Hungary) MOL-Pick Szeged	30–27	23–21	1st
2016–17	GP (Group B)	(Croatia) PPD Zagreb	25–20	27–28	1st
2016–17	GP (Group B)	(Poland) KS Vive Tauron Kielce	40–34	24–27	1st
2016–17	GP (Group B)	(Germany) Rhein-Neckar Löwen	26–29	33–27	1st
2016–17	QF	(Germany) SG Flensburg-Handewitt	35–27	26–24	61–51
2016–17	SF (F4)	(Spain) FC Barcelona Handbol	26–25		
2016–17	F (F4)	(France) PSG Handball	24–23		
2017–18	GP (Group A)	(Poland) Orlen Wisla Plock	31–31	26–22	1st
2017–18	GP (Group A)	(France) HBC Nantes	27–23	26–27	1st
2017–18	GP (Group A)	(Croatia) PPD Zagreb	28–21	29–23	1st
2017–18	GP (Group A)	(Hungary) MOL-Pick Szeged	34–30	26–26	1st
2017–18	GP (Group A)	(Spain) FC Barcelona Handbol	27–24	28–29	1st
2017–18	GP (Group A)	(Sweden) IFK Kristianstad	31–15	26–23	1st
2017–18	GP (Group A)	(Germany) Rhein-Neckar Löwen	30–26	21–21	1st
2017–18	QF	(Germany) THW Kiel	27–28	29–28	56–56
2017–18	SF (F4)	(France) Montpellier HB	27–28		
2017–18	3rd (F4)	(France) PSG Handball	28–29		
2018–19	GP (Group A)	(France) Montpellier HB	33–27	27–24	3rd
2018–19	GP (Group A)	(Sweden) IFK Kristianstad	33–25	32–30	3rd
2018–19	GP (Group A)	(Hungary) Telekom Veszprém	27–29	27–25	3rd
2018–19	GP (Group A)	(Germany) Rhein-Neckar Löwen	29–27	30–27	3rd
2018–19	GP (Group A)	(Poland) PGE Vive Kielce	28–27	27–31	3rd
2018–19	GP (Group A)	(Belarus) HC Meshkov Brest	30–23	31–31	3rd
2018–19	GP (Group A)	(Spain) Barça Lassa	26–30	26–34	3rd
2018–19	L16	(Croatia) PPD Zagreb	32–30	27–18	59–48
2018–19	QF	(Hungary) MOL-Pick Szeged	31–23	25–29	56–52
2018–19	SF (F4)	(Spain) Barça Lassa	29–27		
2018–19	F (F4)	(Hungary) Telekom Veszprém	27–24		
2019–20	GP (Group B)	(France) Montpellier HB	27–31	33–31	6th
2019–20	GP (Group B)	(Portugal) FC Porto Sofarma	32–27	22–30	6th
2019–20	GP (Group B)	(Ukraine) HC Motor Zaporizhzhia	38–28	31–30	6th
2019–20	GP (Group B)	(Germany) THW Kiel	20–31	23–34	6th
2019–20	GP (Group B)	(Hungary) Telekom Veszprém	29–38	30–39	6th
2019–20	GP (Group B)	(Belarus) HC Meshkov Brest	36–31	22–31	6th
2019–20	GP (Group B)	(Poland) PGE Vive Kielce	28–28	25–35	6th
2020–21	GP (Group A)	(Belarus) HC Meshkov Brest	32–36	22–24	7th
2020–21	GP (Group A)	(Norway) Elverum Håndball	34–34	35–32	7th
2020–21	GP (Group A)	(Hungary) MOL-Pick Szeged	26–28	33–34	7th
2020–21	GP (Group A)	(Germany) SG Flensburg-Handewitt	31–26	10-0	7th
2020–21	GP (Group A)	(Portugal) FC Porto	25–25	24–27	7th
2020–21	GP (Group A)	(France) PSG Handball	0-10	5-5	7th
2020–21	GP (Group A)	(Poland) Łomża Vive Kielce	29–33	29–36	7th
2020–21	Playoffs	(Hungary) Veszprém KC	27–41	30–39	57–80
2021–22	GP (Group A)	(Norway) Elverum Håndball	39–30	27–27	5th
2021–22	GP (Group A)	(Belarus) Meshkov Brest	35–27	0–10	5th
2021–22	GP (Group A)	(Denmark) Aalborg Håndbold	30–28	29–33	5th
2021–22	GP (Group A)	(France) Montpellier Handball	25–31	28–25	5th
2021–22	GP (Group A)	(Germany) THW Kiel	26–29	30–32	5th
2021–22	GP (Group A)	(Hungary) Pick Szeged	27–30	31–34	5th
2021–22	GP (Group A)	(Croatia) PPD Zagreb	20–19	22–23	5th
2021–22	Playoffs	(Hungary) Telekom Veszprém	22–30	31–31	53–61
2026–27	GP (Group B)	(Germany) MT Melsungen	26–26	31–33	4th
2026–27	GP (Group B)	(France) HBC Nantes	32–33	33–27	4th
2026–27	GP (Group B)	(Poland) Orlen Wisła Płock	26–32	32–33	4th

=== EHF Cup/European League ===
Season	Round	Club	Home	Away	Aggregate
1994–95	1/16	(Spain) BM Granollers	35–31	23–34	58–65
1995–96	ER	(Bulgaria) HC Shumen	29–24	30–26	59–50
1995–96	1/16	(Croatia) Zadar Gortan	31–31	24–33	55–64
2011–12	R2	(Bosnia and Herzegovina) HC Izvidac	27–25	26–29	53–54
2012–13	R2	(Czech Republic) Lovosice	36–19	24–25	60–44
2012–13	R3	(Germany) SC Magdeburg	28–26	27–30	55–56
2023–24	QR	(Germany) Rhein-Neckar Löwen	25–34	33–37	58–71
2024–25	GS	(Iceland) Valur	33–26	34–34	3rd
2024–25	GS	(Germany) MT Melsungen	32–30	18–34	3rd
2024–25	GS	(Portugal) FC Porto	22–26	24–37	3rd
2025–26	GS	(Croatia) MRK Sesvete	34–29	38–24	1st
2025–26	GS	(France) Fenix Toulouse	37–35	28–26	1st
2025–26	GS	(Sweden) IFK Kristianstad	35–30	31–32	1st
2025–26	MR	(Portugal) SL Benfica	33–27	35–40	1st
2025–26	MR	(Germany) MT Melsungen	37–33	34–25	1st
2025–26	QF	(France) Montpellier Handball	27–24	23–33	50–57
2026–27	PO	(To be determined) TBD	–	–	–

=== EHF Cup Winners' Cup ===
Season	Round	Club	Home	Away	Aggregate
1997–98	1/16	(Sweden) IF Guif Eskilstuna	29–28	25–28	54–56
1998–99	1/16	(Sweden) IFK Skövde HK	10–0	22–23	32–23
1998–99	1/8	(Slovenia) Gorenje Velenje	29–23	24–28	53–51
1998–99	1/4	(France) Sporting Toulouse 31	26–19	24–27	50–46
1998–99	1/2	(Spain) Prosesa Ademar León	27–29	20–35	47–64
2004–05	1/8	(Denmark) FCK Handbold Kopenhagen	27–23	29–28	56–51
2004–05	1/4	(Croatia) Medvescak Infosistem Zagreb	36–20	31–26	67–46
2004–05	1/2	(Croatia) RK Zagreb	23–21	26–34	49–55
2006–07	R2	(Greece) PAOK	43–29	34–29	77–58
2006–07	R3	(France) US Ivry Handball	32–20	29–36	61–56
2006–07	1/8	(Greece) Panellinios AC Athens	28–19	25–22	53–41
2006–07	1/4	(Bosnia and Herzegovina) RK Bosna Sarajevo	32–31	24–33	56–64
2008–09	R2	(Estonia) Chocolate Boys	36–27	30–32	66–59
2008–09	R3	(Switzerland) Kadetten Schaffhausen	33–27	25–33	58–60
2010–11	R3	(Luxembourg) HC Berchem	42–23	29–19	71–42
2010–11	L16	(Denmark) FIF Copenhagen	33–20	27–23	60–43
2010–11	QF	(Romania) UCM Sport RESITA	28–22	18–23	46–45
2010–11	SF	(Germany) VfL Gummersbach	29–38	21–33	50–71

== Statistics ==
=== All–time Top 10 Scorers in the EHF Champions League ===
As of 2021–22 season

Rank	Name	Seasons	Goals
1	(Russia) Timur Dibirov	9	660
2	(Croatia) Igor Karačić	6	351
3	(Croatia) Ivan Čupić	5	295
4	(Spain) Alex Dujshebaev	4	261
5	(North Macedonia) Stojanče Stoilov	9	206
6	(Russia) Daniil Shishkarev	6	194
7	(Latvia) Dainis Krištopāns	3	190
8	(Croatia) Luka Cindrić	3	176
9	(Montenegro) Vuko Borozan	3	156
10	(North Macedonia) Stevče Aluševski	5	121

=== Most appearances in the EHF Champions League ===
As of 2021–22 season

Rank	Name	Seasons	Appearances
1	(Russia) Timur Dibirov	9	143
2	(North Macedonia) Stojanče Stoilov	9	128
3	(Russia) Daniil Shishkarev	6	101
4	(Croatia) Igor Karačić	6	95
5	(Croatia) Ivan Čupić	5	80
6	(Serbia) Ilija Abutović	5	79
7	(Spain) Arpad Šterbik	4	65
8	(Spain) Alex Dujshebaev	4	60
9	(Serbia) Strahinja Milić	5	59
10	(Croatia) Luka Cindrić	3	53
10	(Spain) Jorge Maqueda	3	53
10	(Serbia) Mijajlo Marsenić	3	53

=== Individual awards in the EHF Champions League ===
Season	Player	Award
2013–14	(Russia) Timur Dibirov	All–Star Team (Best Left Wing)
2014–15	(Spain) Alex Dujshebaev	Best Young Player
2016–17	(Spain) Alex Dujshebaev	All–Star Team (Best Right Back)
2016–17	(Spain) Raúl González	Best Coach
2016–17	(Spain) Arpad Šterbik	Final Four MVP
2017–18	(Spain) Arpad Šterbik	All–Star Team (Best Goalkeeper)
2018–19	(Serbia) Dejan Milosavljev	All–Star Team (Best Goalkeeper)
2018–19	(Croatia) Ivan Čupić	All–Star Team (Best Right Wing)
2018–19	(Latvia) Dainis Krištopāns	All–Star Team (Best Right Back)
2018–19	(Russia) Timur Dibirov	All–Star Team (Best Left Wing)
2018–19	(Spain) Roberto García Parrondo	Best Coach
2018–19	(Croatia) Igor Karačić	Final Four MVP

== See also ==
- FK Vardar (football)
- KK Vardar (basketball)
