= Roberto García Parrondo =

Spanish handball player (born 1980)

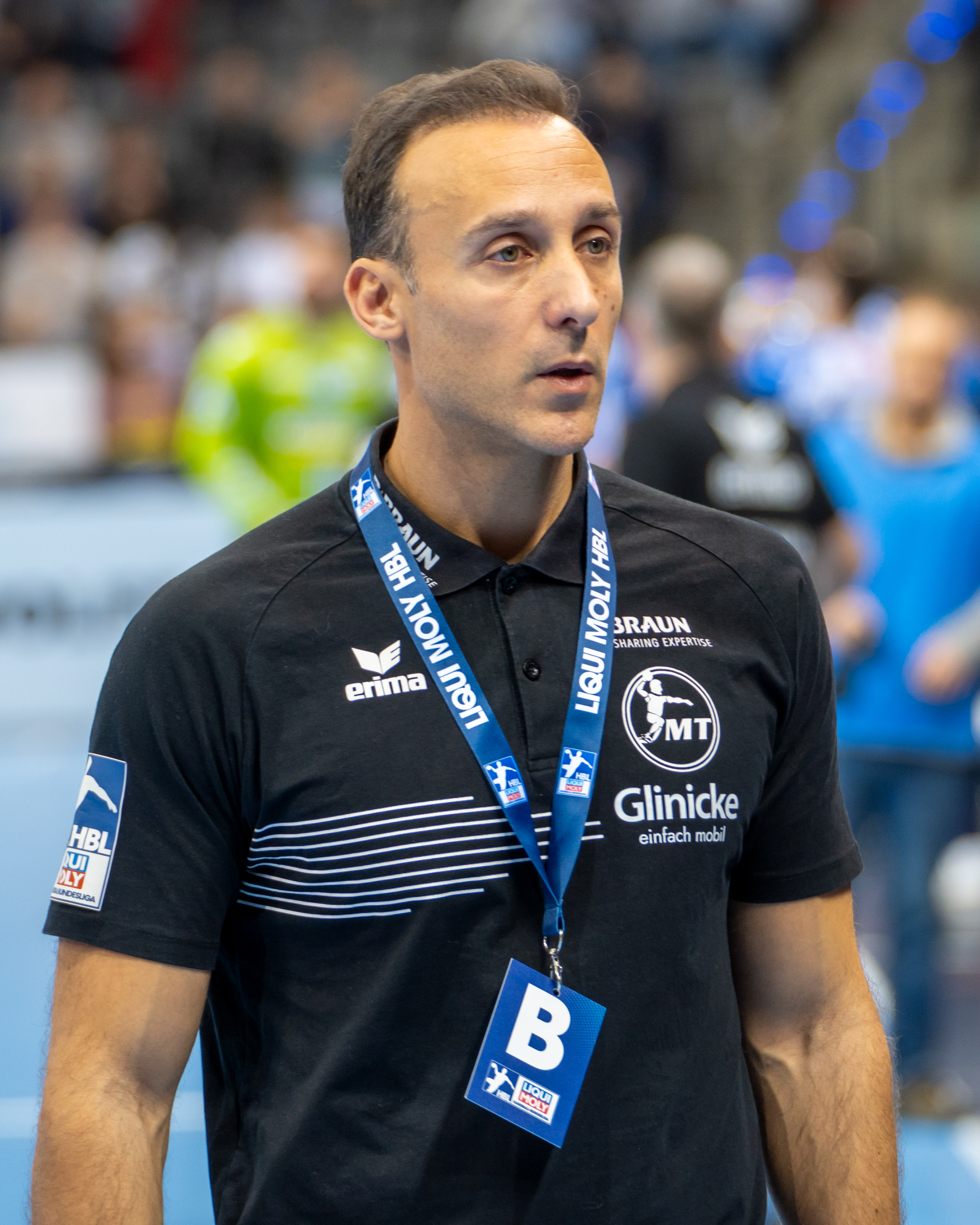
- Parrondo in 2024

Personal information
- Full name: Roberto García Parrondo
- Nationality: Spanish
- Born: 12 January 1980 (age 46) Madrid, Spain
- Height: 186 cm (73 in)

Sport
- Sport: Handball
- Position: Right wing
- Current club: MT Melsungen (manager)

Senior clubs
- Years: Team
- –: CB Getafe
- 1997–2003: BM Valladolid
- 2003–2006: CB Ademar León
- 2006–2007: BM Valladolid
- 2007–2011: BM Ciudad Real
- 2011–2013: Atlético Madrid
- 2013–2016: SC Pick Szeged
- 2016–2017: Budakalász FKC
National team
Years	Team	Apps	(Gls)
–	Spain	74	(174)

Teams managed
- 2017–2019: Macedonia (assistant)
- 2017–2018: ŽRK Vardar (assistant)
- 2018–2019: RK Vardar
- 2019–2023: Egypt
- 2021–: MT Melsungen

Roberto García Parrondo (born 12 January 1980) is a Spanish former handball player and current coach of MT Melsungen.

As part of the Spanish team, he played in the 2005 Mediterranean Games and the 2007 World Championship in Germany. García is 1.86 m tall and weighs 86 kg.

== Honours ==
=== Player ===
==== Club ====
BM Valladolid

- Copa ASOBAL (1): 2002

CB Ademar León

- EHF Cup Winner's Cup (1): 2005

BM Ciudad Real

- Liga ASOBAL (3): 2008, 2009, 2010
- Copa del Rey (2): 2008, 2011
- Copa ASOBAL (2): 2007, 2010
- Supercopa de España (2): 2008, 2011
- EHF Champions League (2): 2008, 2009
- EHF Men's Champions Trophy (1): 2008

BM Atlético de Madrid

- Supercopa de España (1): 2012
- Copa del Rey (2): 2012, 2013
- IHF Super Globe (1): 2012

Pick Szeged

- EHF Cup (1): 2014

==== International ====
Spain

- Mediterranean Games (1): 2005

=== Manager ===
==== Club ====
RK Vardar

- EHF Champions League: 2018–19
- SEHA League: 2018–19
- Macedonian Handball Super League: 2018–19

MT Melsungen

- EHF European League: 2025-26

==== International ====
Egypt

- African Championship: 2020, 2022
