= Sergey Samsonenko =

Russian businessman (born 1967)

- Born: 17 November 1967 (age 58); Rostov-on-Don, Rostov Oblast, Russian SFSR, Soviet Union (today Russian Federation)
- Occupation: Businessman
- Known for: Former owner of sports clubs FK Vardar and RK Vardar
- Spouse: Irina Samsonenko

Sergey Samsonenko (Russian: Сергей Самсоненко; born 17 November 1967) is a Russian millionaire and businessman residing in North Macedonia. He is the former owner of the Macedonian football club FK Vardar and the Macedonian handball club RK Vardar. He and his wife were sanctioned by the US Government in 2023.

== Career ==
He is the owner of Betcity, the largest sports-betting company in Russia and, the first Russian company to enter top 500 most prominent companies.

Sergey built the Russia Hotel in Skopje and created a business aviation airline. He is the Honorary Consul of Russia in Bitola.

== Sanctions ==
On 16 November 2023 the U.S. Department of the Treasury’s Office of Foreign Assets Control (OFAC) sanctioned Sergey Samsonenko and his wife Irina, pursuant to E.O. 14033 for being responsible for or complicit in, or having directly or indirectly engaged in, corruption related to the Western Balkans.
