= 2018–19 SEHA League =

2018-19 SEHA League season
- League: SEHA League
- Sport: Handball
- Games: 90 (regular season); 94 (including F4 tournament)
- Teams: 10; Belarus (1 team); Croatia (2 teams); North Macedonia (2 teams); Serbia (2 teams); Slovakia (1 team); Romania (1 team); Bosnia and Herzegovina (1 team)

Regular season
- Season champions: (North Macedonia) Vardar
- Season MVP: (Croatia) Zlatko Horvat
- Top scorer: (Serbia) Miloš Grozdanić (102 goals)

Final Four
- Finals champions: (North Macedonia) Vardar
- Runners-up: (Croatia) PPD Zagreb
- Finals MVP: (Latvia) Dainis Krištopāns

SEHA League seasons
- ← 2017–18 2019–20 →

The 2018–19 SEHA League season was the eighth season of the SEHA (South East Handball Association) League and fifth under the sponsorship of the Russian oil and gas company Gazprom. Ten teams from seven countries (Belarus, Croatia, North Macedonia, Serbia, Slovakia, Bosnia and Herzegovina and Romania) were participating in this year's competition.

Vardar were the defending champions. The SEHA League consists of two phases – the first one has 18 rounds in which all teams played one home and one away games against each other. Afterwards, the four best ranked clubs played on the Final Four tournament.

Final four tournament was held in Brest, Republic of Belarus, on 2nd and 3 April. RK Vardar defeated PPD Zagreb 26–23 in the final to win their fifth title.

== Team information ==
=== Venues and locations ===
Country	Team	City	Venue (Capacity)
Belarus	Meshkov Brest	Brest	Universal Sports Complex Victoria (3,740)
Croatia	PPD Zagreb	Zagreb	Sutinska Vrela Hall (2,000)
Croatia	Nexe	Našice	Sportska dvorana kralja Tomislava (2,500)
North Macedonia	Vardar	Skopje	Jane Sandanski Arena (7,500)
North Macedonia	Metalurg	Skopje	Boris Trajkovski Sports Center (8,000), Avtokomanda (2,000)
Serbia	Železničar	Niš	Čair Sports Center (4,800)
Serbia	Vojvodina	Novi Sad	SPENS (11,000), SC Slana Bara (2,000)
Slovakia	Tatran Prešov	Prešov	City Hall Prešov (4,870)
Bosnia and Herzegovina	Izviđač	Ljubuški	Ljubuški Sports Hall (4,000)
Romania	Steaua București	Bucharest	Sala Polivalentă (5,300), Sala Sporturilor Concordia (1,465)

Location of teams in 2018-19 SEHA League (Croatia, North Macedonia, Serbia and Bosnia and Herzegovina)
Location of teams in 2018-19 SEHA League (Belarus)
Location of teams in 2018-19 SEHA League (Slovakia)
Location of teams in 2018-19 SEHA League (Romania)

=== Personnel and kits ===
Following is the list of clubs competing in 2018–19 SEHA League, with their manager, team captain, kit manufacturer and shirt sponsor.

Team	Head coach	Team captain	Kit manufacturer	Shirt sponsor (main)
Meshkov Brest	(Spain) Manolo Cadenas	(Belarus) Siarhei Shylovich	Joma	BelGazpromBank
PPD Zagreb	(Slovenia) Branko Tamše	(Croatia) Zlatko Horvat	Hummel	Prvo Plinarsko Društvo
Nexe	(Croatia) Hrvoje Horvat	(Croatia) Vedran Zrnić	Jako	Nexe
Vardar	(Spain) Roberto García Parrondo	(North Macedonia) Stojanče Stoilov	Hummel	Bet City
Metalurg	(North Macedonia) Danilo Brestovac	(North Macedonia) Mario Tankoski	Kempa	ReMedika
Železničar	(Montenegro) Veselin Vujović	(Serbia) Milan Vučković	ASICS	Macron
Vojvodina	(Serbia) Boris Rojević	(Serbia) Vukašin Stojanović	NAAI	Grad Novi Sad
Tatran Prešov	(Croatia) Slavko Goluža	(Slovakia) Radovan Pekár	ATAK Sportswear	Phoenix
Izviđač	(Croatia) Silvio Ivandija	(Bosnia and Herzegovina) Vedran Delić	Hummel	Central Osiguranje
Steaua București	(Romania) Ovidiu Mihăilă	(Romania) Marius Stavrositu	Luanvi	Fundația Alexandrion

=== Coaching changes ===
Round	Club	Outgoing coach	Date of change	Incoming coach
11th	PPD Zagreb	(Croatia) Lino Červar	11 December 2018	(Croatia) Tonči Valčić
11th	PPD Zagreb	(Croatia) Tonči Valčić	4 January 2019	(Slovenia) Branko Tamše

== Regular season ==
=== Standings ===
Pos	Team	Pld	W	D	L	GF	GA	GD	Pts	Qualification
1	(North Macedonia) Vardar	18	14	0	4	512	467	+45	42	Final four
2	(Croatia) PPD Zagreb	18	13	0	5	484	442	+42	39 (Note: PPD Zagreb 6 Pts, +2 GD; Nexe 6 Pts, 0 GD; Meshkov Brest 6 Pts, −2 GD)	Final four
3	(Croatia) Nexe	18	13	0	5	469	420	+49	39	Final four
4	(Belarus) Meshkov Brest	18	13	0	5	573	483	+90	39	Final four
5	(Slovakia) Tatran Prešov	18	12	0	6	493	444	+49	36	
6	(Serbia) Vojvodina	18	7	1	10	441	483	−42	22	
7	(Romania) Steaua București	18	6	0	12	460	524	−64	18	
8	(Serbia) Železničar	18	5	1	12	463	507	−44	16	
9	(North Macedonia) Metalurg	18	4	1	13	494	534	−40	13	
10	(Bosnia and Herzegovina) Izviđač	18	1	1	16	444	529	−85	4	

Source: SEHA Standings

=== Results ===
Home \ Away	(Belarus) MES	(Croatia) ZAG	(Croatia) NEX	(North Macedonia) VAR	(North Macedonia) MET	(Bosnia and Herzegovina) IZV	(Serbia) VOJ	(Slovakia) TAT	(Serbia) ZEL	(Romania) STE
(Belarus) Meshkov Brest		31–26	25–30	35–20	41–29	40–22	35–19	28–32	28–20	35–21
(Croatia) PPD Zagreb	29–24		20–17	26–23	26–22	36–25	25–23	28–29	30–28	24–17
(Croatia) Nexe	26–29	23–22		24–21	26–23	22–17	29–23	27–22	34–25	28–23
(North Macedonia) Vardar	30–32	28–26	31–26		34–28	38–27	33–26	23–21	35–20	27–21
(North Macedonia) Metalurg	28–34	24–36	27–32	26–27		27–27	39–20	30–28	29–30	28–29
(Bosnia and Herzegovina) Izviđač	29–33	21–22	23–24	28–31	30–31		23–25	22–26	29–24	28–29
(Serbia) Vojvodina	29–23	20–23	26–21	23–26	31–30	26–18		17–27	27–27	28–25
(Slovakia) Tatran Prešov	21–35	31–21	26–24	26–27	30–20	29–22	31–24		27–26	26–19
(Serbia) Železničar	30–32	32–33	18–25	22–24	27–25	30–21	20–27	25–36		28–21
(Romania) Steaua București	42–33	24–31	19–31	30–34	26–28	36–32	28–27	26–25	24–31	

Source: SEHA Fixtures and Results
Legend: Blue = home team win; Yellow = draw; Red = away team win.

== Final Four ==
The SEHA - Gazprom League Executive Committee had made the decision for the final four tournament to be held at the Universal Sports Complex Victoria in Brest, Republic of Belarus, on 2nd and 3 April. The first-placed team of the standings faced the fourth-placed team, and the second-placed team played against the third-placed team from the standings in the Final Four.

=== Bracket ===
Semifinals
2 April
(Croatia) PPD Zagreb	28
(Croatia) Nexe	23
2 April
(North Macedonia) Vardar	25
(Belarus) Meshkov Brest	23

Final
3 April
(Croatia) PPD Zagreb	23
(North Macedonia) Vardar	26
Third place
3 April
(Croatia) Nexe	19
(Belarus) Meshkov Brest	24

==== Semifinals ====
2 April 2019; 16:30 CEST (UTC+02:00)	PPD Zagreb (Croatia)	28–23	(Croatia) Nexe	Universal Sports Complex Victoria, Brest; Attendance: 1,235; Referees: Nikolić, Stojković (SRB)
2 April 2019; 16:30 CEST (UTC+02:00)	Bičanić 7	(18–15)	Buvinić 7	Universal Sports Complex Victoria, Brest; Attendance: 1,235; Referees: Nikolić, Stojković (SRB)
2 April 2019; 16:30 CEST (UTC+02:00)	2× (yellow card) 2× (suspension)	Report	2× (yellow card) 3× (suspension)	Universal Sports Complex Victoria, Brest; Attendance: 1,235; Referees: Nikolić, Stojković (SRB)

2 April 2019; 19:00 CEST (UTC+02:00)	Vardar (North Macedonia)	25–23	(Belarus) Meshkov Brest	Universal Sports Complex Victoria, Brest; Attendance: 3,420; Referees: Mandak, Rudinsky (SVK)
2 April 2019; 19:00 CEST (UTC+02:00)	Stoilov 7	(14–10)	three players 3	Universal Sports Complex Victoria, Brest; Attendance: 3,420; Referees: Mandak, Rudinsky (SVK)
2 April 2019; 19:00 CEST (UTC+02:00)	2× (yellow card) 2× (suspension)	Report	3× (yellow card) 4× (suspension)	Universal Sports Complex Victoria, Brest; Attendance: 3,420; Referees: Mandak, Rudinsky (SVK)

==== Match for third place ====
3 April 2019; 16:30 CEST (UTC+02:00)	Nexe (Croatia)	19–24	(Belarus) Meshkov Brest	Universal Sports Complex Victoria, Brest; Attendance: 3,270; Referees: Stark, Ştefan (ROU)
3 April 2019; 16:30 CEST (UTC+02:00)	Jaganjac, Šipić 5	(8–12)	Baranau 5	Universal Sports Complex Victoria, Brest; Attendance: 3,270; Referees: Stark, Ştefan (ROU)
3 April 2019; 16:30 CEST (UTC+02:00)	3× (yellow card) 1× (suspension)	Report	3× (yellow card) 3× (suspension)	Universal Sports Complex Victoria, Brest; Attendance: 3,270; Referees: Stark, Ştefan (ROU)

==== Final ====
3 April 2019; 19:00 CEST (UTC+02:00)	PPD Zagreb (Croatia)	23–26	(North Macedonia) Vardar	Universal Sports Complex Victoria, Brest; Attendance: 3,210; Referees: Pavićević, Ražnatović (MNE)
3 April 2019; 19:00 CEST (UTC+02:00)	Mrakovčić 4	(12–14)	Krištopāns 7	Universal Sports Complex Victoria, Brest; Attendance: 3,210; Referees: Pavićević, Ražnatović (MNE)
3 April 2019; 19:00 CEST (UTC+02:00)	2× (yellow card) 5× (suspension) 2× (red card)	Report	1× (yellow card) 1× (suspension) 1× (red card)	Universal Sports Complex Victoria, Brest; Attendance: 3,210; Referees: Pavićević, Ražnatović (MNE)

== Top goalscorers ==
Rank	Player	Club	Goals
1	(Serbia) Miloš Grozdanić	(Serbia) Vojvodina	102
2	(Croatia) Bruno Butorac	(Slovakia) Tatran Prešov	90
3	(Croatia) Halil Jaganjac	(Croatia) Nexe	85

== Awards ==
The all-star team was announced on 3 April 2019.

- Goalkeeper: Dejan Milosavljev (SRB)
- Right wing: Zlatko Horvat (CRO)
- Right back: Dainis Krištopāns (LAT)
- Centre back: Sandro Obranović (CRO)
- Left back: Damir Bičanić (CRO)
- Left wing: Timur Dibirov (RUS)
- Pivot: Stojanče Stoilov (MKD)
- Best Defender: Pavel Horák (CZE)
- MVP of the Final four: Dainis Krištopāns (LAT)
