= Mario Tankoski =

Macedonian handball player

Personal information
- Nationality: Macedonian
- Born: 28 August 1998 (age 28) Struga, Macedonia
- Height: 1.92 m (6 ft 4 in)

Sport
- Sport: Handball
- Position: Centre back
- Current club: RK Vardar 1961
- Number: 14

Youth career
- Years: Team
- 2013–2017: RK Metalurg II

Senior clubs
- Years: Team
- 2015–2017: RK Metalurg II
- 2017–2020: RK Metalurg Skopje
- 2020–2024: RK Eurofarm Pelister
- 2024–: RK Vardar 1961
National team
Years	Team	Apps	(Gls)
2019–	North Macedonia	12	(5)

Mario Tankoski (Macedonian: Марио Танкоски) (born 28 August 1998) is a Macedonian handball player for RK Vardar 1961 and the North Macedonia national team.

He participated at the 2017 Men's Junior World Handball Championship.

== Trophies ==
- Macedonian Handball Super League (North Macedonia)

Winner Gold :2020, 2023, 2024, 2026

- Cups (North Macedonia)

Winner Gold : 2019, 2026
