= Jane Sandanski Arena =

Sports venue in Skopje, North Macedonia

Sportskiot Centar "Jane Sandanski"
- Luxury Arena
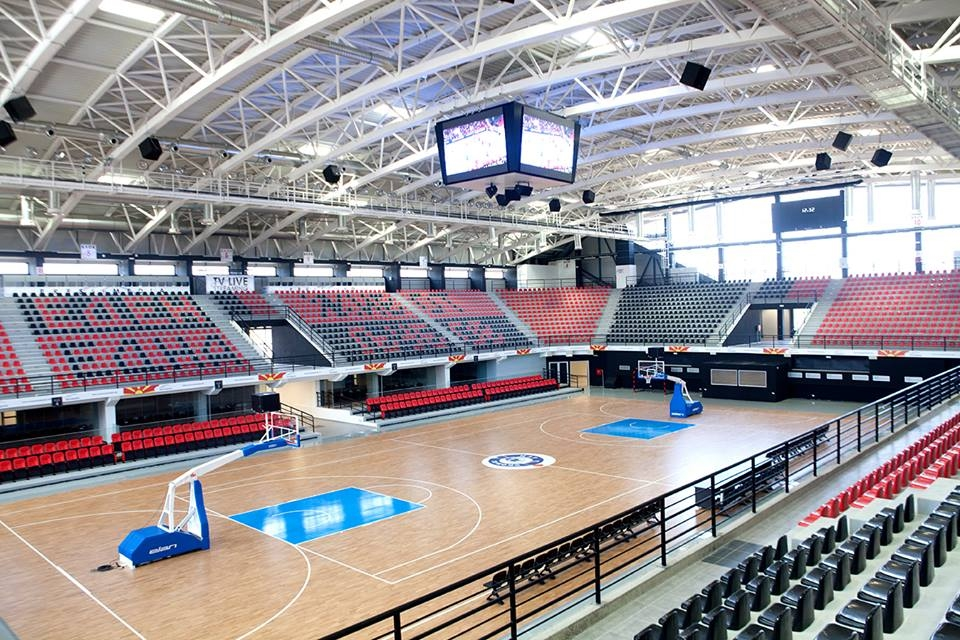
- Jane Sandanski Arena in Skopje (2015)
- Interactive map of Sportskiot Centar "Jane Sandanski"
- Location: Aerodrom, North Macedonia
- Coordinates: 41.993249°N 21.464866°E
- Owner: Sergey Samsonenko
- Capacity: 6.000 (greater hall); 800 (small hall)

Construction
- Opened: 1980s
- Closed: 15 February 2013
- Reopened: August 2014
- Demolished: 2012
- Cost: €15,000,000

Tenant
- MZT Skopje Aerodrom / RK Vardar / WHC Vardar

Jane Sandanski Arena (Macedonian: Спортскиот центар „Јане Сандански“ or Сала „Јане Сандански“) is an indoor sports arena located in the Aerodrom Municipality of Skopje, North Macedonia. It has a capacity of 6,000. It is named after the revolutionary Jane Sandanski.

== History ==
On 18 November 2012, it was announced that the arena would be completely demolished, with a new arena called Sports Centre Jane Sandanski planned to be built in its place. On 14 February 2013, MZT Aerodrom held their last training in Jane Sandanski, with more than a thousand fans attending. The following day the arena was officially closed and demolished.

It was rebuilt and reopened in August 2014, financed by the Russian businessman Sergey Samsonenko, built alongside the four-star hotel "Russia". In September 2015, the west and east stands were upgraded by 650 seats and south and north stands upgraded with 500 seats. Now the arena is the home ground of MZT Skopje Aerodrom, RK Vardar and WHC Vardar.

== Hotel and spa ==
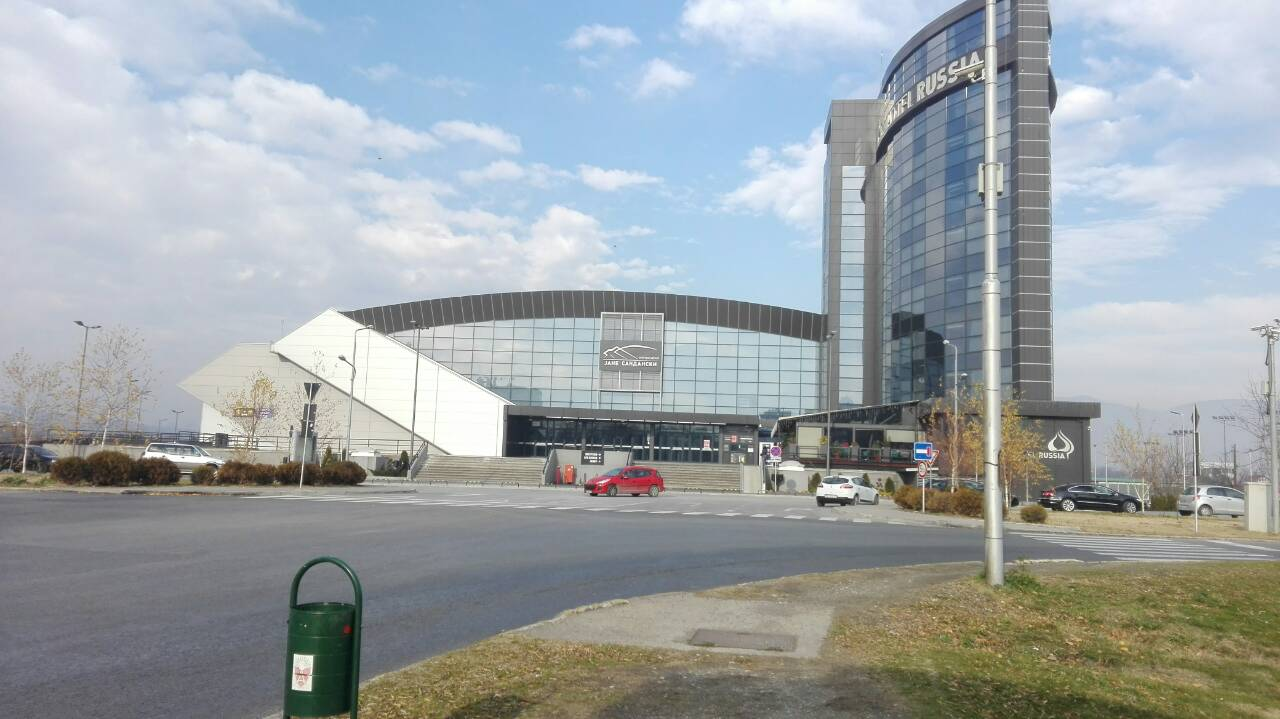
Sandanski Arena Hotel and Spa

Sandanski Arena is a super modern sports center. The sports complex includes a 4-star hotel with a spa center, swimming pool and a sky bar. Tennis courts, fitness center and clubs headquarters are within the sports complex. Sports Centre Jane Sandanski also has an aerobics center, tennis and table tennis courts, playground for children and exclusive HUMMEL sports store and fan shop.

== See also ==
- List of indoor arenas in North Macedonia
