= 2017–18 SEHA League =

2017–18 SEHA League season
- League: SEHA League
- Sport: Handball
- Duration: 30 August 2017 – 17 March 2018
- Games: 90 (regular season); 94 (including F4 tournament)
- Teams: 10; Belarus (1 team); Croatia (2 teams); Macedonia (2 teams); Serbia (2 teams); Slovakia (1 team); Slovenia (2 teams)

Regular season
- Season champions: (North Macedonia) Vardar
- Season MVP: Luka Cindrić
- Top scorer: Halil Jaganjac (100 goals)

Final Four
- Finals champions: (North Macedonia) Vardar
- Runners-up: (Croatia) PPD Zagreb
- Finals MVP: Luka Cindrić

SEHA League seasons
- 2016–17 2018–19

The 2017–18 SEHA League season was the seventh season of the SEHA (South East Handball Association) League and fourth under the sponsorship of the Russian oil and gas company Gazprom. Ten teams from six countries (Belarus, Croatia, Macedonia, Serbia, Slovakia and Slovenia) participated in this year's competition.

Vardar are the defending champions. The SEHA League consists of two phases – the first one has 18 rounds in which all teams play one home and one away games against each other. Afterwards, the four best ranked clubs played on the Final Four tournament.

The campaign began on 30 August 2017 with three matches from the first round. The regular season ended on 17 March 2018.

The final four tournament was held at the Jane Sandanski Arena in Skopje, Macedonia from 13th to 15 April 2018.

== Team information ==
=== Venues and locations ===
Country	Team	City	Venue (Capacity)
Belarus	Meshkov Brest	Brest	Universal Sports Complex Victoria (3,740)
Croatia	PPD Zagreb	Zagreb	Arena Zagreb (15,200); Sutinska Vrela Hall (2,000)
Croatia	Nexe	Našice	Sportska dvorana (2,500)
(North Macedonia) Macedonia	Vardar	Skopje	Jane Sandanski Arena (6,000)
(North Macedonia) Macedonia	Metalurg	Skopje	Boris Trajkovski Sports Center (7,000), Avtokomanda (2,000)
Serbia	Dinamo	Pančevo	Strelište Sports Hall (1,100)
Serbia	Vojvodina	Novi Sad	SPENS (11,000), SC Slana Bara (2,000)
Slovakia	Tatran Prešov	Prešov	City Hall Prešov (4,000)
Slovenia	Gorenje Velenje	Velenje	Red Hall (2,500)
Slovenia	Celje Pivovarna Laško	Celje	Zlatorog Arena (5,500)

Location of teams in 2017-18 SEHA League (Croatia, Macedonia, Serbia and Slovenia)
Location of teams in 2017-18 SEHA League (Belarus)
Location of teams in 20167-18 SEHA League (Slovakia)

=== Personnel and kits ===
Following is the list of clubs competing in 2017–18 SEHA League, with their manager, team captain, kit manufacturer and shirt sponsor.

Team	Head coach	Team captain	Kit manufacturer	Shirt sponsor (main)
Meshkov Brest	(Ukraine) Serhiy Bebeshko	(Belarus) Dzmitry Nikulenkau	Joma	BelGazpromBank
PPD Zagreb	(Croatia) Zlatko Saračević	(Croatia) Igor Vori	Hummel	Prvo Plinarsko Društvo
Nexe	(Croatia) Hrvoje Horvat	(Croatia) Marko Mrđenović	Jako	Nexe
Vardar	(Spain) Raúl González	(North Macedonia) Stojanče Stoilov	Hummel	Bet City
Metalurg	(Croatia) Lino Červar	(North Macedonia) Filip Kuzmanovski	Kempa	Duferco Makstil
Dinamo	(Serbia) Ivan Petković	(Serbia) Branko Radanović	unit-sport	Grad Pančevo
Vojvodina	(Bosnia and Herzegovina) Kasim Kamenica	(Serbia) Vukašin Stojanović	NAAI	Vinarija Zvonko Bogdan
Tatran Prešov	(Croatia) Slavko Goluža	(Slovakia) Radovan Pekár	ATAK Sportswear	Phoenix
Gorenje Velenje	(Croatia) Željko Babić	(Slovenia) Niko Medved	Kempa	Gorenje
Celje Pivovarna Laško	(Slovenia) Branko Tamše	(Slovenia) David Razgor	Nike	Laško

=== Coaching changes ===
Round	Club	Outgoing coach	Date of change	Incoming coach
3rd	Vojvodina	(Serbia) Boško Rudić	18 September 2017	(Serbia) Dragan Kukić
7th	PPD Zagreb	(Bosnia and Herzegovina) Kasim Kamenica	27 November 2017	(Croatia) Zlatko Saračević
12th	Vojvodina	(Serbia) Dragan Kukić	6 January 2018	(Bosnia and Herzegovina) Kasim Kamenica
18th	Vojvodina	(Bosnia and Herzegovina) Kasim Kamenica	28 March 2018	(Serbia) Boris Rojević

== Regular season ==
=== Standings ===
Pos	Team	Pld	W	D	L	GF	GA	GD	Pts	Qualification
1	(North Macedonia) Vardar	18	17	1	0	565	445	+120	52	Final four
2	(Croatia) PPD Zagreb	18	12	2	4	514	463	+51	38	Final four
3	(Slovenia) Celje Pivovarna Laško	18	11	2	5	540	489	+51	35	Final four
4	(Belarus) Meshkov Brest	18	10	1	7	532	499	+33	31	Final four
5	(Slovenia) Gorenje Velenje	18	9	3	6	523	482	+41	30	
6	(Slovakia) Tatran Prešov	18	6	4	8	494	487	+7	22	
7	(North Macedonia) Metalurg	18	7	1	10	487	521	−34	22	
8	(Croatia) Nexe	18	2	6	10	455	510	−55	12	
9	(Serbia) Dinamo	18	2	3	13	456	554	−98	9	
10	(Serbia) Vojvodina	18	2	1	15	461	567	−106	7	

Source: SEHA Standings

=== Results ===
Home \ Away	(Belarus) MES	(Croatia) ZAG	(Croatia) NEX	(North Macedonia) VAR	(North Macedonia) MET	(Serbia) DIN	(Serbia) VOJ	(Slovakia) TAT	(Slovenia) GOR	(Slovenia) CEL
(Belarus) Meshkov Brest		24–23	35–23	25–25	35–30	29–26	32–27	32–26	32–33	30–34
(Croatia) PPD Zagreb	27–24		27–19	24–25	30–28	40–29	35–25	32–26	26–25	25–25
(Croatia) Nexe	19–29	29–30		21–30	31–31	27–19	33–28	23–27	24–24	23–35
(North Macedonia) Vardar	31–23	30–23	29–25		31–24	42–32	37–22	32–28	32–19	35–27
(North Macedonia) Metalurg	37–33	26–32	29–22	23–32		33–25	30–26	31–30	24–29	28–26
(Serbia) Dinamo	26–33	28–28	25–25	23–27	20–25		22–20	26–26	27–29	26–37
(Serbia) Vojvodina	27–36	21–29	29–28	32–36	21–19	24–29		23–23	27–39	26–31
(Slovakia) Tatran Prešov	24–23	33–28	26–26	22–30	27–19	36–24	35–26		27–27	25–26
(Slovenia) Gorenje Velenje	37–28	23–25	30–30	24–30	37–25	34–24	37–20	27–25		22–25
(Slovenia) Celje Pivovarna Laško	24–29	23–30	27–27	28–31	34–25	39–25	36–27	32–28	31–27	

Legend: Blue = home team win; Yellow = draw; Red = away team win.

== Final Four ==
The SEHA - Gazprom League Executive Committee has made the decision for the final four tournament to be held at the Jane Sandanski Arena in Skopje, Macedonia from 13th to 15 April.

=== Format ===
The first-placed team of the standings faced the fourth-placed team, and the second-placed team played against the third-placed team from the standings in the Final Four.

=== Semifinals ===
13 April 2018; 17:45 CEST (UTC+02:00)	Vardar (North Macedonia)	33–24	(Belarus) Meshkov Brest	Jane Sandanski Arena, Skopje; Attendance: 5,380; Referees: Gubica, Milošević (CRO)
13 April 2018; 17:45 CEST (UTC+02:00)	Cindrić 6	(17–14)	Baranau 9	Jane Sandanski Arena, Skopje; Attendance: 5,380; Referees: Gubica, Milošević (CRO)
13 April 2018; 17:45 CEST (UTC+02:00)	3× (yellow card) 1× (suspension)	Report	3× (yellow card) 5× (suspension)	Jane Sandanski Arena, Skopje; Attendance: 5,380; Referees: Gubica, Milošević (CRO)

13 April 2018; 20:15 CEST (UTC+02:00)	PPD Zagreb (Croatia)	29–28	(Slovenia) Celje Pivovarna Laško	Jane Sandanski Arena, Skopje; Attendance: 2,270; Referees: Nikolov, Nachevski (MKD)
13 April 2018; 20:15 CEST (UTC+02:00)	Pavlović 7	(14–11)	Mačkovšek 6	Jane Sandanski Arena, Skopje; Attendance: 2,270; Referees: Nikolov, Nachevski (MKD)
13 April 2018; 20:15 CEST (UTC+02:00)	3× (yellow card) 2× (suspension)	Report	4× (yellow card) 3× (suspension)	Jane Sandanski Arena, Skopje; Attendance: 2,270; Referees: Nikolov, Nachevski (MKD)

=== Match for third place ===
15 April 2018; 17:45 CEST (UTC+02:00)	Meshkov Brest (Belarus)	28–31	(Slovenia) Celje Pivovarna Laško	Jane Sandanski Arena, Skopje; Attendance: 3,000; Referees: Nikolić Stojković (SRB)
15 April 2018; 17:45 CEST (UTC+02:00)	Horák, Shumak 5	(14–15)	Mlakar 7	Jane Sandanski Arena, Skopje; Attendance: 3,000; Referees: Nikolić Stojković (SRB)
15 April 2018; 17:45 CEST (UTC+02:00)	4× (suspension)	Report	4× (yellow card) 4× (suspension) 1× (red card)	Jane Sandanski Arena, Skopje; Attendance: 3,000; Referees: Nikolić Stojković (SRB)

=== Final ===
15 April 2018; 20:15 CEST (UTC+02:00)	Vardar (North Macedonia)	26–24	(Croatia) PPD Zagreb	Jane Sandanski Arena, Skopje; Attendance: 6,000; Referees: Brynovski, Čanda (SVK)
15 April 2018; 20:15 CEST (UTC+02:00)	Cindrić, Krištopāns 5	(14–13)	Horvat 8	Jane Sandanski Arena, Skopje; Attendance: 6,000; Referees: Brynovski, Čanda (SVK)
15 April 2018; 20:15 CEST (UTC+02:00)	2× (yellow card) 1× (suspension)	Report	2× (yellow card) 2× (suspension) 1× (red card)	Jane Sandanski Arena, Skopje; Attendance: 6,000; Referees: Brynovski, Čanda (SVK)

== Top goalscorers ==
As of 15 April 2018

Rank	Player	Club	Goals
1	(Croatia) Halil Jaganjac	(North Macedonia) Metalurg	100
2	(Croatia) Bruno Butorac	(Slovakia) Tatran Prešov	95
3	(Croatia) Zlatko Horvat	(Croatia) PPD Zagreb	92
