= Timur Dibirov =

Russian handball player

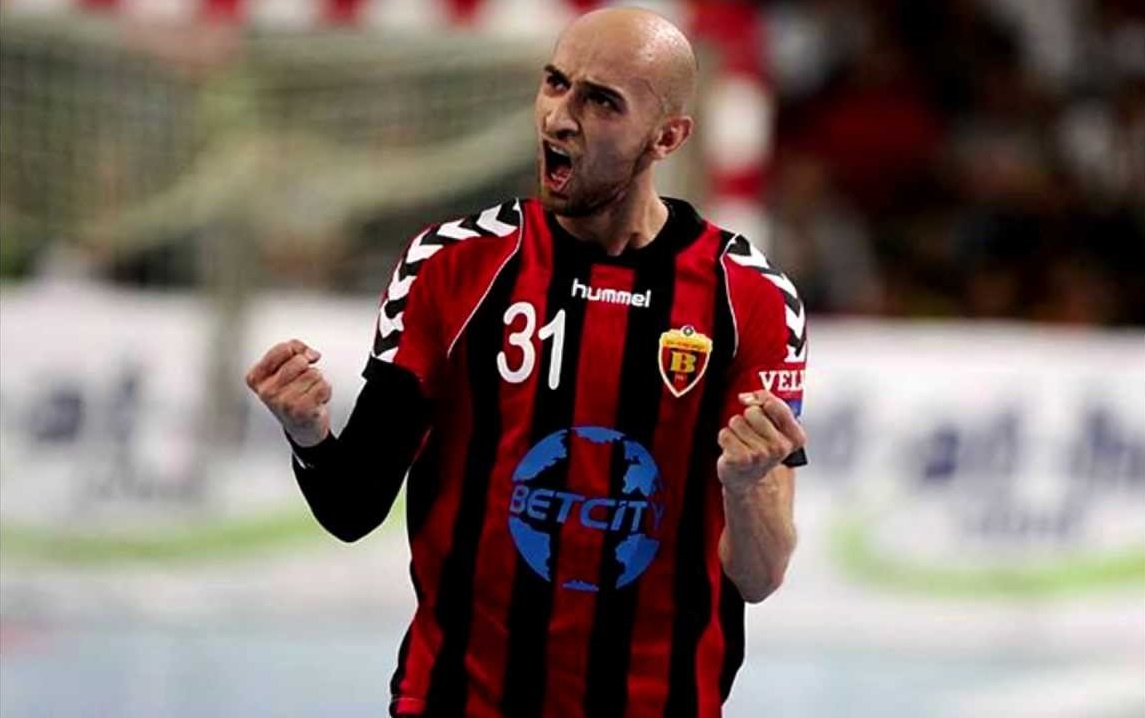
- Dibirov in c. 2014

Personal information
- Full name: Timur Magomedovich Dibirov
- Nationality: Russian; Macedonian
- Born: 30 July 1983 (age 43) Petrozavodsk, Russian SFSR, Soviet Union
- Height: 1.80 m (5 ft 11 in)

Sport
- Sport: Handball
- Position: Left wing

Senior clubs
- Years: Team
- 2004–2013: Chekhovskiye Medvedi
- 2013–2022: RK Vardar 1961
- 2022–2025: RK Zagreb
National team
Years	Team	Apps	(Gls)
2006–2020	Russia	215	(747)

Timur Magomedovich Dibirov (Russian: Тимур Магомедович Дибиров; born 30 July 1983) is a Russian former handball player.

He competed at the 2008 Summer Olympics in Beijing, where the Russian team placed sixth.

Besides the Russian, Dibirov also holds Macedonian citizenship.

Dibirov is all-time top scorer for RK Vardar in the EHF Champions League having scored 525 goals as of 19 November 2020.

He was voted Best left wing of the season 2022/2023 for the EHF Excellence Awards.

== Personal life ==
Married to handball player Irina Poltoratskaya. They have two children — a son, Murad, and a daughter, Tiana.

== Honours ==
RK Vardar

- Macedonian Handball Super League: 2014–15, 2015–16, 2016–17, 2017–18, 2018–19, 2020–21, 2021–22
- Macedonian Handball Cup: 2014, 2015, 2016, 2017, 2018, 2021, 2022
- Macedonian Handball Super Cup: 2017, 2018, 2019
- SEHA League: 2013–14, 2016–17, 2017–18, 2018–19
- EHF Champions League: 2016–17, 2018–19

RK Zagreb

- Croatian Handball Premier League: 2022–23

Individual honours

- EHF Excellence Awards: Left Wing of the Season 2022/23
