= 2018–19 EHF Champions League =

European handball competition

EHF Champions League
- 2018–19

Tournament information
- Sport: Handball
- Location: Lanxess Arena (FINAL4)
- Dates: 12 September 2018–2 June 2019
- Teams: 28
- Website: ehfcl.com

Final positions
- Champions: (North Macedonia) RK Vardar
- Runner-up: (Hungary) Telekom Veszprém

Tournament statistics
- Matches played: 200
- Goals scored: 11395 (56.98 per match)
- Attendance: 738,682 (3,693 per match)
- Top scorer(s): (Spain) Alex Dujshebaev (99 goals)

The 2018–19 EHF Champions League was the 59th edition of Europe's premier club handball tournament and the 26th edition under the current EHF Champions League format.

RK Vardar defeated Telekom Veszprém 27–24 in the final to win their second title.

== Competition format ==
Twenty-eight teams, divided into four groups, participated in the competition. Groups A and B were played with eight teams each, in a round robin, home and away format. The top team in each group qualified directly for the quarter-finals, while the bottom two in each group dropped out of the competition. The remaining 10 teams qualified for the first knockout phase.

In Groups C and D, six teams played in each group in a round robin format, with both home and away games. The top two teams in each group then met in an elimination play-off, with the two winners proceeding to the first knockout phase. The remaining teams were eliminated from the competition.

Knockout phase 1 (last 16)

12 teams played home and away in the first knockout phase, with the 10 teams qualified from Groups A and B and the two teams qualified from Groups C and D.

Knockout phase 2 (quarter-finals)

The six winners of the matches in the first knockout phase were joined by the winners of Groups A and B to play home and away for the right to contest the VELUX EHF FINAL4.

VELUX EHF FINAL4

The culmination of the season, the VELUX EHF FINAL4, continued in its existing format, with the four top teams from the competition competing for the title over one weekend in LANXESS arena, Cologne.

== Team allocation ==
28 teams were directly qualified for the group stage.

Groups A/B
(Belarus) Meshkov Brest	(Croatia) PPD Zagreb	(Denmark) Skjern Håndbold	(France) Montpellier Handball
(France) HBC Nantes	(France) Paris Saint-Germain	(Germany) Flensburg-Handewitt	(Germany) Rhein-Neckar Löwen
(Hungary) MOL-Pick Szeged	(Hungary) Telekom Veszprém	(North Macedonia) RK Vardar	(Poland) PGE Vive Kielce
(Spain) Barça Lassa	(Sweden) IFK Kristianstad	(Slovenia) Celje Pivovarna Laško	(Ukraine) Motor Zaporizhzhia
Groups C/D
(Denmark) Bjerringbro-Silkeborg	(Finland) Riihimäki Cocks	(North Macedonia) Metalurg Skopje	(Norway) Elverum Håndball
(Poland) Wisła Płock	(Portugal) Sporting CP	(Romania) Dinamo București	(Russia) Chekhovskiye Medvedi
(Slovakia) Tatran Prešov	(Spain) Ademar León	(Switzerland) Wacker Thun	(Turkey) Beşiktaş

== Round and draw dates ==
Phase	Draw date
Group stage	29 June 2018
Knockout stage	29 June 2018
Final Four (Cologne)	7 May 2019

== Group stage ==
Location of teams of the 2018–19 EHF Champions League group stage.
Red: Group A; Blue: Group B; Green: Group C; Yellow: Group D.

The draw for the group stage was held on 29 June 2018 at 12:30 at the Erste Campus in Vienna, Austria. The 28 teams were drawn into four groups, two containing eight teams (Groups A and B) and two containing six teams (Groups C and D). The only restriction was that teams from the same national association could not face each other in the same group. The only exception was HBC Nantes, who play against one of the two French rivals in the group.

In each group, teams will play against each other in a double round-robin format, with home and away matches.

After completion of the group stage matches, the teams advancing to the knockout stage will be determined in the following manner:

- Groups A and B – the top team will qualify directly for the quarterfinals, and the five teams ranked 2nd–6th will advance to the first knockout round.
- Groups C and D – the top two teams from both groups contest a playoff to determine the last two sides joining the 10 teams from Groups A and B in the first knockout round.

Tiebreakers
In the group stage, teams are ranked according to points (2 points for a win, 1 point for a draw, 0 points for a loss). After completion of the group stage, if two or more teams have scored the same number of points, the ranking will be determined as follows:
1. Highest number of points in matches between the teams directly involved;
2. Superior goal difference in matches between the teams directly involved;
3. Highest number of goals scored in matches between the teams directly involved (or in the away match in case of a two-team tie);
4. Superior goal difference in all matches of the group;
5. Highest number of plus goals in all matches of the group;

If the ranking of one of these teams is determined, the above criteria are consecutively followed until the ranking of all teams is determined. If no ranking can be determined, a decision shall be obtained by EHF through drawing of lots.

During the group stage, only criteria 4–5 apply to determine the provisional ranking of teams.

=== Group A ===
Pos	Team	Pld	W	D	L	GF	GA	GD	Pts	Qualification	BAR	VES	VAR	KIE	RNL	BRE	MON	KRI
1	(Spain) Barça Lassa	14	12	0	2	486	391	+95	24	Quarterfinals	—	31–28	34–26	31–27	30–25	41–32	35–27	43–26
2	(Hungary) Telekom Veszprém	14	10	0	4	410	382	+28	20	First knockout round	29–26	—	24–27	29–27	28–29	28–20	25–19	36–27
3	(North Macedonia) RK Vardar	14	9	1	4	406	390	+16	19	First knockout round	26–30	27–29	—	28–27	29–27	30–23	33–27	33–25
4	(Poland) PGE Vive Kielce	14	7	0	7	439	430	+9	14 (Note: Vive Kielce 64–62 Rhein-Neckar Löwen)	First knockout round	36–42	35–36	31–27	—	35–32	33–31	27–28	33–31
5	(Germany) Rhein-Neckar Löwen	14	7	0	7	418	410	+8	14	First knockout round	35–34	25–29	27–30	30–29	—	33–27	37–27	36–27
6	(Belarus) Meshkov Brest	14	4	1	9	379	419	−40	9	First knockout round	21−29	28–29	31–31	26–35	27–24	—	26–23	32–23
7	(France) Montpellier	14	3	1	10	377	414	−37	7		28–36	29–30	24–27	26–29	31–26	29–23	—	30–31
8	(Sweden) IFK Kristianstad	14	2	1	11	396	475	−79	5		25–44	32–29	30–31	33–34	27–32	30–32	29–29	—

Source: EHF

=== Group B ===
Pos	Team	Pld	W	D	L	GF	GA	GD	Pts	Qualification	PAR	SZE	FLE	NAN	ZAP	ZAG	SKJ	CEL
1	(France) Paris Saint-Germain	14	13	0	1	455	385	+70	26	Quarterfinals	—	33–31	29–28	35–34	31–25	33–28	38–28	33–21
2	(Hungary) MOL-Pick Szeged	14	9	2	3	411	397	+14	20	First knockout round	33–32	—	30–28	30–28	30–29	26–26	33–33	33–24
3	(Germany) Flensburg-Handewitt	14	7	1	6	378	370	+8	15	First knockout round	20–27	27–25	—	29–29	31–24	29–31	26–22	27–26
4	(France) HBC Nantes	14	5	4	5	421	408	+13	14	First knockout round	31–35	29–26	31–34	—	23–27	23–20	35–27	38–27
5	(Ukraine) Motor Zaporizhzhia	14	5	1	8	389	381	+8	11 (Note: Motor Zaporizhzhia 59–54 Zagreb)	First knockout round	29–35	31–32	28–26	30–30	—	35–27	33–23	36–27
6	(Croatia) PPD Zagreb	14	4	3	7	382	420	−38	11	First knockout round	21–32	23–24	21–22	27–27	27–24	—	32–29	24–22
7	(Denmark) Skjern Håndbold	14	3	2	9	398	439	−41	8		24–26	26–29	24–31	32–34	37–33	31–31	—	35–32
8	(Slovenia) Celje Pivovarna Laško	14	3	1	10	380	416	−36	7		32–36	28–29	23–20	29–29	33–28	30–21	26–27	—

Source: EHF

=== Group C ===
Pos	Team	Pld	W	D	L	GF	GA	GD	Pts	Qualification	BJE	SPO	PRE	MED	BES	SKO
1	(Denmark) Bjerringbro-Silkeborg	10	8	0	2	323	273	+50	16	Playoffs	—	29–28	29–30	39–28	34–27	33–25
2	(Portugal) Sporting CP	10	7	0	3	304	277	+27	14 (Note: Sporting 56–55 Prešov)	Playoffs	32–35	—	26–28	33–31	34–28	34–26
3	(Slovakia) Tatran Prešov	10	7	0	3	278	268	+10	14		26–24	27–30	—	27–28	27–23	30–24
4	(Russia) Chekhovskiye Medvedi	10	4	0	6	280	279	+1	8		24–30	22–23	38–26	—	22–24	33–25
5	(Turkey) Beşiktaş	10	3	0	7	255	289	−34	6		24–37	27–33	22–28	27–30	—	23–22
6	(North Macedonia) Metalurg Skopje	10	1	0	9	246	300	−54	2		29–33	24–31	24–29	25–24	22–30	—

Source: EHF

=== Group D ===
Pos	Team	Pld	W	D	L	GF	GA	GD	Pts	Qualification	BUC	PLO	ELV	LEO	RII	THU
1	(Romania) Dinamo București	10	7	0	3	293	280	+13	14 (Note: Dinamo 52–50 Płock)	Playoffs	—	24–21	26–24	35–30	24–22	35–34
2	(Poland) Wisła Płock	10	7	0	3	278	250	+28	14	Playoffs	29–28	—	30–28	25–23	34–18	34–24
3	(Norway) Elverum Håndball	10	6	1	3	278	272	+6	13		29–28	28–30	—	30–25	28–27	29–28
4	(Spain) Ademar León	10	5	2	3	252	251	+1	12		31–28	27–24	24–24	—	23–20	24–21
5	(Finland) Riihimäki Cocks	10	2	2	6	246	269	−23	6		31–32	27–26	25–28	19–19	—	31–29
6	(Switzerland) Wacker Thun	10	0	1	9	268	293	−25	1		29–33	23–25	29–30	25–26	26–26	—

Source: EHF

=== Playoffs ===
The top two teams from Groups C and D contested a playoff to determine the two sides advancing to the knockout phase. The winners of each group will face the runners-up of the other group in a two-legged tie.

Team 1	Agg.	Team 2	1st leg	2nd leg
Sporting CP (Portugal)	59–57	(Romania) Dinamo București	32–31	27–26
Wisła Płock (Poland)	49–46	(Denmark) Bjerringbro-Silkeborg	22–26	27–20

== Knockout stage ==
The first-placed team from the preliminary groups A and B advanced to the quarterfinals, while the 2–6th placed teams advanced to the round of 16 alongside the playoff winners.

=== Round of 16 ===
Team 1	Agg.	Team 2	1st leg	2nd leg
Sporting CP (Portugal)	57–65	(Hungary) Telekom Veszprém	28–30	29–35
Wisła Płock (Poland)	36–45	(Hungary) MOL-Pick Szeged	20–22	16–23
PPD Zagreb (Croatia)	48–59	(North Macedonia) RK Vardar	18–27	30–32
Meshkov Brest (Belarus)	48–60	(Germany) Flensburg-Handewitt	28–30	20–30
Motor Zaporizhzhia (Ukraine)	62–67	(Poland) PGE Vive Kielce	33–33	29–34
Rhein-Neckar Löwen (Germany)	61–62	(France) HBC Nantes	34–32	27–30

=== Quarterfinals ===
Team 1	Agg.	Team 2	1st leg	2nd leg
HBC Nantes (France)	51–61	(Spain) Barça Lassa	25–32	26–29
PGE Vive Kielce (Poland)	60–59	(France) Paris Saint-Germain	34–24	26–35
Flensburg-Handewitt (Germany)	47–57	(Hungary) Telekom Veszprém	22–28	25–29
RK Vardar (North Macedonia)	56–52	(Hungary) MOL-Pick Szeged	31–23	25–29

=== Final four ===
Semifinals
1 June
(Hungary) Telekom Veszprém	33
(Poland) PGE Vive Kielce	30
1 June
(Spain) Barça Lassa	27
(North Macedonia) RK Vardar	29

Final
2 June
(Hungary) Telekom Veszprém	24
(North Macedonia) RK Vardar	27
Third place
2 June
(Poland) PGE Vive Kielce	35
(Spain) Barça Lassa	40

==== Final ====
2 June 2019; 18:00	RK Vardar (North Macedonia)	27–24	(Hungary) Telekom Veszprém	Lanxess Arena, Cologne; Attendance: 19,250; Referees: Geipel, Helbig (GER)
2 June 2019; 18:00	Ferreira 6	(16–11)	Mahé 6	Lanxess Arena, Cologne; Attendance: 19,250; Referees: Geipel, Helbig (GER)
2 June 2019; 18:00	4× (yellow card) 2× (suspension)	Report	1× (yellow card) 5× (suspension)	Lanxess Arena, Cologne; Attendance: 19,250; Referees: Geipel, Helbig (GER)

== Statistics and awards ==
=== Top goalscorers ===
Rank	Player	Club	Goals
1	(Spain) Alex Dujshebaev	(Poland) PGE Vive Kielce	99
2	(Latvia) Dainis Krištopāns	(North Macedonia) RK Vardar	94
3	(Switzerland) Andy Schmid	(Germany) Rhein-Neckar Löwen	91
4	(Belarus) Barys Pukhouski	(Ukraine) Motor Zaporizhzhia	87
4	(France) Melvyn Richardson	(France) Montpellier	87
6	(Croatia) Zlatko Horvat	(Croatia) PPD Zagreb	85
7	(Spain) Valero Rivera Folch	(France) HBC Nantes	81
8	(France) Nedim Remili	(France) Paris Saint-Germain	80
9	(Germany) Uwe Gensheimer	(France) Paris Saint-Germain	79
9	(Croatia) Igor Karačić	(North Macedonia) RK Vardar	79
9	(Germany) Jannik Kohlbacher	(Germany) Rhein-Neckar Löwen	79
9	(Serbia) Petar Nenadić	(Hungary) Telekom Veszprém	79

=== Awards ===
- MVP of the Final four: (Croatia) Igor Karačić
- Best Defender: (Slovenia) Blaž Blagotinšek
- Best Young player: (France) Ludovic Fabregas
- Coach: (Spain) Roberto García Parrondo

=== All-star team ===
The all-star team was announced on 31 May 2019.

Position	Player
Goalkeeper	(Serbia) Dejan Milosavljev
Right wing	(Croatia) Ivan Čupić
Right back	(Latvia) Dainis Krištopāns
Centre back	(France) Kentin Mahé
Left back	(Denmark) Mikkel Hansen
Left wing	(Russia) Timur Dibirov
Pivot	(Spain) Julen Aguinagalde
