= 2019–20 EHF Champions League group stage =

The 2019–20 EHF Champions League group stage began on 11 September 2019 and was concluded on 1 March 2020. A total of 28 teams competed for 14 places in the knockout stage of the 2019–20 EHF Champions League.

== Draw ==
The draw for the group stage was held on 27 June 2019.

=== Seedings ===
The seedings were announced on 20 June 2018.

Seeding pots for Groups A and B
Pot 1	Pot 2	Pot 3	Pot 4
(France) Paris Saint-Germain (North Macedonia) Vardar	(Spain) Barça (Hungary) Telekom Veszprém	(Germany) SG Flensburg-Handewitt (Poland) PGE Vive Kielce	(Belarus) HC Meshkov Brest (Denmark) Aalborg Håndbold
Pot 5	Pot 6	Pot 7	Pot 8
(Hungary) MOL-Pick Szeged (Ukraine) HC Motor Zaporizhzhia	(Croatia) PPD Zagreb (France) Montpellier Handball	(Norway) Elverum Håndball (Portugal) FC Porto Sofarma	(Germany) THW Kiel (Slovenia) Celje Pivovarna Laško

Seeding pots for Groups C and D
Pot 1	Pot 2	Pot 3
(Romania) CS Dinamo București (Sweden) IK Sävehof	(Russia) Chekhovskiye Medvedi (Slovakia) Tatran Prešov	(Finland) Riihimäki Cocks (Switzerland) Kadetten Schaffhausen
Pot 4	Pot 5	Pot 6
(North Macedonia) Eurofarm Rabotnik (Sweden) IFK Kristianstad	(Spain) Bidasoa Irun (Poland) Orlen Wisła Płock	(Denmark) GOG Håndbold (Portugal) Sporting CP

== Format ==
In each group, teams played against each other in a double round-robin format, with home and away matches. After completion of the group stage matches, the teams advancing to the knockout stage was determined in the following manner:

- Groups A and B – the top teams qualified directly for the quarter-finals, and the five teams ranked 2nd–6th advanced to the first knockout round.
- Groups C and D – the top two teams from both groups contested a playoff to determine the last two sides joining the ten teams from Groups A and B in the first knockout round.

== Tiebreakers ==
In the group stage, teams are ranked according to points (2 points for a win, 1 point for a draw, 0 points for a loss). After completion of the group stage, if two or more teams have the same number of points, the ranking is determined as follows:

1. Highest number of points in matches between the teams directly involved;
2. Superior goal difference in matches between the teams directly involved;
3. Highest number of goals scored in matches between the teams directly involved (or in the away match in case of a two-team tie);
4. Superior goal difference in all matches of the group;
5. Highest number of plus goals in all matches of the group;

If the ranking of one of these teams is determined, the above criteria are consecutively followed until the ranking of all teams is determined. If no ranking can be determined, a decision shall be obtained by EHF through drawing of lots.

== Groups ==
The matchdays were 11–15 September, 18–22 September, 25–29 September, 9–13 October, 16–20 October, 30 October–3 November, 6–10 November, 13–17 November, 20–24 November, 27 November–1 December 2019. For Groups A and B, additional matchdays included, 5–9 February, 12–16 February, 19–23 February and 26 February–1 March 2020.

=== Group A ===
Pos	Team	Pld	W	D	L	GF	GA	GD	Pts	Qualification
1	(Spain) Barça	14	13	0	1	485	380	+105	26	Quarterfinals
2	(France) Paris Saint-Germain	14	11	0	3	444	389	+55	22	First knockout round
3	(Hungary) MOL-Pick Szeged	14	9	2	3	409	370	+39	20	First knockout round
4	(Denmark) Aalborg Håndbold	14	7	1	6	416	420	−4	15 (Note: Aalborg Håndbold 63–57 SG Flensburg-Handewitt)	First knockout round
5	(Germany) SG Flensburg-Handewitt	14	7	1	6	388	379	+9	15	First knockout round
6	(Slovenia) Celje Pivovarna Laško	14	3	0	11	355	429	−74	6	First knockout round
7	(Croatia) PPD Zagreb	14	2	1	11	343	419	−76	5	
8	(Norway) Elverum Håndball	14	1	1	12	365	419	−54	3	

Source: EHF
Rules for classification: Tiebreakers
Notes:

14 September 2019; 17:30	MOL-Pick Szeged (Hungary)	31–28	(Spain) Barça	Városi Sportcsarnok, Szeged; Attendance: 3,200; Referees: Elíasson, Pálsson (ISL)
14 September 2019; 17:30	Maqueda 7	(18–11)	Fabregas 8	Városi Sportcsarnok, Szeged; Attendance: 3,200; Referees: Elíasson, Pálsson (ISL)
14 September 2019; 17:30	2× (yellow card) 3× (suspension)	Report	2× (yellow card) 2× (suspension)	Városi Sportcsarnok, Szeged; Attendance: 3,200; Referees: Elíasson, Pálsson (ISL)

14 September 2019; 20:00	PPD Zagreb (Croatia)	29–37	(France) Paris Saint-Germain	Arena Zagreb, Zagreb; Attendance: 5,865; Referees: Horváth, Marton (HUN)
14 September 2019; 20:00	Bičanić, Horvat 6	(15–19)	Ekdahl du Rietz 7	Arena Zagreb, Zagreb; Attendance: 5,865; Referees: Horváth, Marton (HUN)
14 September 2019; 20:00	2× (yellow card) 5× (suspension)	Report	1× (yellow card) 2× (suspension)	Arena Zagreb, Zagreb; Attendance: 5,865; Referees: Horváth, Marton (HUN)

15 September 2019; 17:00	Celje Pivovarna Laško (Slovenia)	24–25	(Germany) SG Flensburg-Handewitt	Zlatorog Arena, Celje; Attendance: 4,000; Referees: Caçador, Nicolau (POR)
15 September 2019; 17:00	Šarac 5	(12–13)	Golla 6	Zlatorog Arena, Celje; Attendance: 4,000; Referees: Caçador, Nicolau (POR)
15 September 2019; 17:00	1× (yellow card) 4× (suspension)	Report	2× (yellow card) 5× (suspension)	Zlatorog Arena, Celje; Attendance: 4,000; Referees: Caçador, Nicolau (POR)

15 September 2019; 19:00	Elverum Håndball (Norway)	24–34	(Denmark) Aalborg Håndbold	Terningen Arena, Elverum; Attendance: 2,283; Referees: Mažeika, Gatelis (LTU)
15 September 2019; 19:00	Guðjónsson, Sandell 5	(12–18)	Barthold, Christiansen 7	Terningen Arena, Elverum; Attendance: 2,283; Referees: Mažeika, Gatelis (LTU)
15 September 2019; 19:00	2× (yellow card) 3× (suspension)	Report	2× (yellow card) 4× (suspension)	Terningen Arena, Elverum; Attendance: 2,283; Referees: Mažeika, Gatelis (LTU)

18 September 2019; 19:00	SG Flensburg-Handewitt (Germany)	26–19	(Norway) Elverum Håndball	Flens-Arena, Flensburg; Attendance: 3,105; Referees: Bonaventura, Bonaventura (FRA)
18 September 2019; 19:00	Svan Hansen 6	(12–9)	Guðjónsson 7	Flens-Arena, Flensburg; Attendance: 3,105; Referees: Bonaventura, Bonaventura (FRA)
18 September 2019; 19:00	1× (yellow card) 2× (suspension)	Report	2× (yellow card) 2× (suspension)	Flens-Arena, Flensburg; Attendance: 3,105; Referees: Bonaventura, Bonaventura (FRA)

21 September 2019; 20:00	Barça (Spain)	45–21	(Slovenia) Celje Pivovarna Laško	Palau Blaugrana, Barcelona; Attendance: 1,905; Referees: Gasmi, Gasmi (FRA)
21 September 2019; 20:00	Cindrić 8	(21–13)	Silva 5	Palau Blaugrana, Barcelona; Attendance: 1,905; Referees: Gasmi, Gasmi (FRA)
21 September 2019; 20:00	1× (yellow card) 2× (suspension)	Report	2× (yellow card) 2× (suspension)	Palau Blaugrana, Barcelona; Attendance: 1,905; Referees: Gasmi, Gasmi (FRA)

22 September 2019; 16:50	Aalborg (Denmark)	30–20	(Croatia) PPD Zagreb	Jutlander Bank Arena, Aalborg; Attendance: 4,133; Referees: Schulze, Tönnies (GER)
22 September 2019; 16:50	Barthold 12	(13–11)	Horvat, Hrstić 4	Jutlander Bank Arena, Aalborg; Attendance: 4,133; Referees: Schulze, Tönnies (GER)
22 September 2019; 16:50	3× (yellow card) 4× (suspension)	Report	3× (yellow card) 5× (suspension) 2× (red card)	Jutlander Bank Arena, Aalborg; Attendance: 4,133; Referees: Schulze, Tönnies (GER)

22 September 2019; 19:00	Paris Saint-Germain (France)	30–25	(Hungary) MOL-Pick Szeged	Stade Pierre de Coubertin, Paris; Attendance: 1,800; Referees: Nikolov, Nachevski (MKD)
22 September 2019; 19:00	N. Karabatić 8	(16–14)	Maqueda 6	Stade Pierre de Coubertin, Paris; Attendance: 1,800; Referees: Nikolov, Nachevski (MKD)
22 September 2019; 19:00	2× (yellow card) 4× (suspension)	Report	2× (yellow card) 3× (suspension)	Stade Pierre de Coubertin, Paris; Attendance: 1,800; Referees: Nikolov, Nachevski (MKD)

28 September 2019; 17:30	MOL-Pick Szeged (Hungary)	24–24	(Germany) SG Flensburg-Handewitt	Városi Sportcsarnok, Szeged; Attendance: 3,200; Referees: Brunovský, Čanda (SVK)
28 September 2019; 17:30	Radivojević 11	(12–12)	Johannessen 9	Városi Sportcsarnok, Szeged; Attendance: 3,200; Referees: Brunovský, Čanda (SVK)
28 September 2019; 17:30	1× (yellow card) 1× (suspension)	Report	2× (yellow card)	Városi Sportcsarnok, Szeged; Attendance: 3,200; Referees: Brunovský, Čanda (SVK)

28 September 2019; 17:30	Elverum Håndball (Norway)	22–25	(France) Paris Saint-Germain	Håkons Hall, Lillehammer; Attendance: 12,377; Referees: Horáček, Novotný (CZE)
28 September 2019; 17:30	Sandell 5	(9–13)	Keïta 8	Håkons Hall, Lillehammer; Attendance: 12,377; Referees: Horáček, Novotný (CZE)
28 September 2019; 17:30	3× (yellow card) 6× (suspension) 1× (red card)	Report	3× (suspension)	Håkons Hall, Lillehammer; Attendance: 12,377; Referees: Horáček, Novotný (CZE)

28 September 2019; 20:30	PPD Zagreb (Croatia)	19–36	(Spain) Barça	Krešimir Ćosić Hall, Zadar; Attendance: 6,900; Referees: Leszczyński, Piechota (POL)
28 September 2019; 20:30	Šipić 4	(9–21)	Gómez 8	Krešimir Ćosić Hall, Zadar; Attendance: 6,900; Referees: Leszczyński, Piechota (POL)
28 September 2019; 20:30	1× (yellow card) 7× (suspension)	Report	2× (yellow card) 4× (suspension)	Krešimir Ćosić Hall, Zadar; Attendance: 6,900; Referees: Leszczyński, Piechota (POL)

29 September 2019; 17:00	Celje Pivovarna Laško (Slovenia)	28–29	(Denmark) Aalborg Handbold	Zlatorog Arena, Celje; Referees: Nikolić, Stojković (SRB)
29 September 2019; 17:00	Silva, Šarac 6	(14–10)	Jensen 5	Zlatorog Arena, Celje; Referees: Nikolić, Stojković (SRB)
29 September 2019; 17:00	1× (yellow card) 3× (suspension)	Report	2× (yellow card) 5× (suspension) 1× (red card)	Zlatorog Arena, Celje; Referees: Nikolić, Stojković (SRB)

9 October 2019; 19:00	SG Flensburg-Handewitt (Germany)	20–17	(Croatia) PPD Zagreb	Flens-Arena, Flensburg; Attendance: 3,355; Referees: Kurtagic, Wetterwik (SWE)
9 October 2019; 19:00	Golla 5	(10–10)	Horvat 6	Flens-Arena, Flensburg; Attendance: 3,355; Referees: Kurtagic, Wetterwik (SWE)
9 October 2019; 19:00	2× (yellow card) 3× (suspension)	Report	1× (yellow card) 3× (suspension)	Flens-Arena, Flensburg; Attendance: 3,355; Referees: Kurtagic, Wetterwik (SWE)

12 October 2019; 20:00	Barça (Spain)	33–24	(Norway) Elverum Håndball	Palau Blaugrana, Barcelona; Attendance: 1,996; Referees: Brkic, Jusufhodzic (AUT)
12 October 2019; 20:00	Cindrić 7	(15–12)	Henneberg 8	Palau Blaugrana, Barcelona; Attendance: 1,996; Referees: Brkic, Jusufhodzic (AUT)
12 October 2019; 20:00	1× (yellow card) 4× (suspension)	Report	3× (yellow card) 3× (suspension)	Palau Blaugrana, Barcelona; Attendance: 1,996; Referees: Brkic, Jusufhodzic (AUT)

13 October 2019; 16:50	Aalborg (Denmark)	28–35	(Hungary) MOL-Pick Szeged	Jutlander Bank Arena, Aalborg; Attendance: 4,382; Referees: Santos, Fonseca (POR)
13 October 2019; 16:50	Møllgaard 7	(17–22)	Bánhidi 11	Jutlander Bank Arena, Aalborg; Attendance: 4,382; Referees: Santos, Fonseca (POR)
13 October 2019; 16:50	2× (yellow card) 3× (suspension)	Report	4× (suspension)	Jutlander Bank Arena, Aalborg; Attendance: 4,382; Referees: Santos, Fonseca (POR)

13 October 2019; 17:00	Paris Saint-Germain (France)	27–18	(Slovenia) Celje Pivovarna Laško	Stade Pierre de Coubertin, Paris; Attendance: 2,500; Referees: Konjičanin, Konjičanin (BIH)
13 October 2019; 17:00	Remili 7	(13–11)	Grebenc 5	Stade Pierre de Coubertin, Paris; Attendance: 2,500; Referees: Konjičanin, Konjičanin (BIH)
13 October 2019; 17:00	1× (yellow card) 1× (suspension)	Report	2× (yellow card) 4× (suspension)	Stade Pierre de Coubertin, Paris; Attendance: 2,500; Referees: Konjičanin, Konjičanin (BIH)

19 October 2019; 20:00	Barça (Spain)	36–32	(France) Paris Saint-Germain	Palau Blaugrana, Barcelona; Attendance: 4,315; Referees: Nikolov, Nachevski (MKD)
19 October 2019; 20:00	Gómez 8	(19–15)	L. Karabatic 8	Palau Blaugrana, Barcelona; Attendance: 4,315; Referees: Nikolov, Nachevski (MKD)
19 October 2019; 20:00	1× (yellow card) 2× (suspension)	Report	3× (suspension)	Palau Blaugrana, Barcelona; Attendance: 4,315; Referees: Nikolov, Nachevski (MKD)

20 October 2019; 16:50	Aalborg (Denmark)	31–28	(Germany) SG Flensburg-Handewitt	Jutlander Bank Arena, Aalborg; Attendance: 4,653; Referees: Baďura, Ondogrecula (SVK)
20 October 2019; 16:50	Barthold 8	(14–16)	Johannessen, Svan Hansen 6	Jutlander Bank Arena, Aalborg; Attendance: 4,653; Referees: Baďura, Ondogrecula (SVK)
20 October 2019; 16:50	2× (yellow card) 1× (suspension)	Report	3× (yellow card) 3× (suspension)	Jutlander Bank Arena, Aalborg; Attendance: 4,653; Referees: Baďura, Ondogrecula (SVK)

20 October 2019; 17:00	Celje Pivovarna Laško (Slovenia)	32–25	(Norway) Elverum Håndball	Zlatorog Arena, Celje; Attendance: 3,300; Referees: Geipel, Helbig (GER)
20 October 2019; 17:00	three players 5	(14–15)	Guðjónsson 10	Zlatorog Arena, Celje; Attendance: 3,300; Referees: Geipel, Helbig (GER)
20 October 2019; 17:00	2× (yellow card) 3× (suspension)	Report	1× (yellow card) 3× (suspension)	Zlatorog Arena, Celje; Attendance: 3,300; Referees: Geipel, Helbig (GER)

20 October 2019; 17:00	PPD Zagreb (Croatia)	21–26	(Hungary) MOL-Pick Szeged	Arena Zagreb, Zagreb; Attendance: 3,721; Referees: Zotin, Volodkov (RUS)
20 October 2019; 17:00	Šipić 6	(10–15)	Maqueda, Šoštarič 5	Arena Zagreb, Zagreb; Attendance: 3,721; Referees: Zotin, Volodkov (RUS)
20 October 2019; 17:00	3× (yellow card) 9× (suspension) 1× (red card)	Report	3× (yellow card) 6× (suspension) 1× (red card)	Arena Zagreb, Zagreb; Attendance: 3,721; Referees: Zotin, Volodkov (RUS)

30 October 2019; 19:00	SG Flensburg-Handewitt (Germany)	27–34	(Spain) Barça	Flens-Arena, Flensburg; Attendance: 5,221; Referees: Mažeika, Gatelis (LTU)
30 October 2019; 19:00	Jurecki 5	(12–18)	three players 5	Flens-Arena, Flensburg; Attendance: 5,221; Referees: Mažeika, Gatelis (LTU)
30 October 2019; 19:00	2× (yellow card) 4× (suspension)	Report	1× (yellow card) 6× (suspension)	Flens-Arena, Flensburg; Attendance: 5,221; Referees: Mažeika, Gatelis (LTU)

2 November 2019; 17:15	Paris Saint-Germain (France)	37–24	(Denmark) Aalborg Handbold	Stade Pierre de Coubertin, Paris; Attendance: 2,500; Referees: Pavićević, Ražnatović (MNE)
2 November 2019; 17:15	Hansen 6	(18–11)	Jakobsen 5	Stade Pierre de Coubertin, Paris; Attendance: 2,500; Referees: Pavićević, Ražnatović (MNE)
2 November 2019; 17:15	2× (yellow card) 4× (suspension)	Report	2× (yellow card) 2× (suspension)	Stade Pierre de Coubertin, Paris; Attendance: 2,500; Referees: Pavićević, Ražnatović (MNE)

3 November 2019; 17:00	MOL-Pick Szeged (Hungary)	31–24	(Slovenia) Celje Pivovarna Laško	Városi Sportcsarnok, Szeged; Attendance: 3,200; Referees: Bonaventura, Bonaventura (FRA)
3 November 2019; 17:00	Radivojević 8	(14–14)	Šarac 7	Városi Sportcsarnok, Szeged; Attendance: 3,200; Referees: Bonaventura, Bonaventura (FRA)
3 November 2019; 17:00	1× (yellow card)	Report	2× (yellow card) 3× (suspension)	Városi Sportcsarnok, Szeged; Attendance: 3,200; Referees: Bonaventura, Bonaventura (FRA)

3 November 2019; 19:00	Elverum Håndball (Norway)	30–30	(Croatia) PPD Zagreb	Terningen Arena, Elverum; Attendance: 2,034; Referees: Santos, Fonseca (POR)
3 November 2019; 19:00	Blonz 8	(13–18)	Gadža 8	Terningen Arena, Elverum; Attendance: 2,034; Referees: Santos, Fonseca (POR)
3 November 2019; 19:00	2× (yellow card) 8× (suspension)	Report	3× (yellow card) 6× (suspension)	Terningen Arena, Elverum; Attendance: 2,034; Referees: Santos, Fonseca (POR)

6 November 2019; 19:00	SG Flensburg-Handewitt (Germany)	29–30	(France) Paris Saint-Germain	Flens-Arena, Flensburg; Attendance: 5,030; Referees: Jurinović, Mrvica (CRO)
6 November 2019; 19:00	Rød, Steinhauser 6	(13–14)	Hansen, N. Karabatić 5	Flens-Arena, Flensburg; Attendance: 5,030; Referees: Jurinović, Mrvica (CRO)
6 November 2019; 19:00	3× (yellow card)	Report	1× (yellow card) 2× (suspension)	Flens-Arena, Flensburg; Attendance: 5,030; Referees: Jurinović, Mrvica (CRO)

10 November 2019; 16:50	Aalborg (Denmark)	30–34	(Spain) Barça	Jutlander Bank Arena, Aalborg; Attendance: 5,000; Referees: Brunner, Salah (SUI)
10 November 2019; 16:50	Jensen 6	(14–15)	Gómez 9	Jutlander Bank Arena, Aalborg; Attendance: 5,000; Referees: Brunner, Salah (SUI)
10 November 2019; 16:50	2× (yellow card) 2× (suspension)	Report	1× (yellow card) 4× (suspension)	Jutlander Bank Arena, Aalborg; Attendance: 5,000; Referees: Brunner, Salah (SUI)

10 November 2019; 17:00	MOL-Pick Szeged (Hungary)	32–25	(Norway) Elverum Håndball	Városi Sportcsarnok, Szeged; Attendance: 3,200; Referees: Sondors, Līcis (LAT)
10 November 2019; 17:00	Zhitnikov 5	(15–13)	Blonz 8	Városi Sportcsarnok, Szeged; Attendance: 3,200; Referees: Sondors, Līcis (LAT)
10 November 2019; 17:00	1× (yellow card) 6× (suspension) 1× (red card)	Report	2× (yellow card) 5× (suspension)	Városi Sportcsarnok, Szeged; Attendance: 3,200; Referees: Sondors, Līcis (LAT)

10 November 2019; 17:00	Celje Pivovarna Laško (Slovenia)	24–22	(Croatia) PPD Zagreb	Zlatorog Arena, Celje; Attendance: 4,850; Referees: Marín, García (ESP)
10 November 2019; 17:00	Šarac 6	(10–8)	Bičanić 6	Zlatorog Arena, Celje; Attendance: 4,850; Referees: Marín, García (ESP)
10 November 2019; 17:00	1× (yellow card) 5× (suspension)	Report	2× (yellow card) 5× (suspension)	Zlatorog Arena, Celje; Attendance: 4,850; Referees: Marín, García (ESP)

14 November 2019; 18:00	PPD Zagreb (Croatia)	27–31	(Slovenia) Celje Pivovarna Laško	Arena Zagreb, Zagreb; Attendance: 2,634; Referees: Horáček, Novotný (CZE)
14 November 2019; 18:00	Vistorop 6	(11–14)	Šarac 10	Arena Zagreb, Zagreb; Attendance: 2,634; Referees: Horáček, Novotný (CZE)
14 November 2019; 18:00	2× (yellow card) 4× (suspension)	Report	1× (yellow card) 5× (suspension) 1× (red card)	Arena Zagreb, Zagreb; Attendance: 2,634; Referees: Horáček, Novotný (CZE)

16 November 2019; 20:00	Barça (Spain)	44–35	(Denmark) Aalborg Handbold	Palau Blaugrana, Barcelona; Attendance: 2,139; Referees: Geipel, Helbig (GER)
16 November 2019; 20:00	Gómez 9	(22–17)	Saugstrup 6	Palau Blaugrana, Barcelona; Attendance: 2,139; Referees: Geipel, Helbig (GER)
16 November 2019; 20:00	2× (yellow card) 1× (suspension)	Report	2× (yellow card) 1× (suspension)	Palau Blaugrana, Barcelona; Attendance: 2,139; Referees: Geipel, Helbig (GER)

17 November 2019; 17:00	Paris Saint-Germain (France)	32–30	(Germany) SG Flensburg-Handewitt	Stade Pierre de Coubertin, Paris; Attendance: 2,500; Referees: Leszczyński, Piechota (POL)
17 November 2019; 17:00	Hansen, Sagosen 7	(17–16)	four players 5	Stade Pierre de Coubertin, Paris; Attendance: 2,500; Referees: Leszczyński, Piechota (POL)
17 November 2019; 17:00	2× (yellow card) 4× (suspension)	Report	3× (yellow card) 6× (suspension)	Stade Pierre de Coubertin, Paris; Attendance: 2,500; Referees: Leszczyński, Piechota (POL)

17 November 2019; 19:00	Elverum Håndball (Norway)	25–26	(Hungary) MOL-Pick Szeged	Terningen Arena, Elverum; Attendance: 1,941; Referees: Kurtagic, Wetterwik (SWE)
17 November 2019; 19:00	Sandell 10	(9–14)	Maqueda 6	Terningen Arena, Elverum; Attendance: 1,941; Referees: Kurtagic, Wetterwik (SWE)
17 November 2019; 19:00	1× (yellow card) 2× (suspension)	Report	1× (yellow card) 5× (suspension)	Terningen Arena, Elverum; Attendance: 1,941; Referees: Kurtagic, Wetterwik (SWE)

23 November 2019; 20:00	Barça (Spain)	31–27	(Germany) SG Flensburg-Handewitt	Palau Blaugrana, Barcelona; Attendance: 2,521; Referees: Santos, Fonseca (POR)
23 November 2019; 20:00	Gómez 10	(15–15)	Lier, Steinhauser 6	Palau Blaugrana, Barcelona; Attendance: 2,521; Referees: Santos, Fonseca (POR)
23 November 2019; 20:00	4× (suspension)	Report	1× (yellow card) 4× (suspension)	Palau Blaugrana, Barcelona; Attendance: 2,521; Referees: Santos, Fonseca (POR)

24 November 2019; 16:50	Aalborg (Denmark)	29–32	(France) Paris Saint-Germain	Jutlander Bank Arena, Aalborg; Attendance: 5,000; Referees: Brkic, Jusufhodzic (AUT)
24 November 2019; 16:50	Saugstrup 6	(14–17)	Hansen, Sagosen 7	Jutlander Bank Arena, Aalborg; Attendance: 5,000; Referees: Brkic, Jusufhodzic (AUT)
24 November 2019; 16:50	2× (yellow card) 1× (suspension)	Report	2× (yellow card) 4× (suspension)	Jutlander Bank Arena, Aalborg; Attendance: 5,000; Referees: Brkic, Jusufhodzic (AUT)

24 November 2019; 17:00	Celje Pivovarna Laško (Slovenia)	23–34	(Hungary) MOL-Pick Szeged	Zlatorog Arena, Celje; Attendance: 4,900; Referees: Brunner, Salah (SUI)
24 November 2019; 17:00	Šarac 6	(11–19)	Bánhidi 7	Zlatorog Arena, Celje; Attendance: 4,900; Referees: Brunner, Salah (SUI)
24 November 2019; 17:00	2× (yellow card) 4× (suspension)	Report	1× (yellow card) 4× (suspension)	Zlatorog Arena, Celje; Attendance: 4,900; Referees: Brunner, Salah (SUI)

24 November 2019; 17:00	PPD Zagreb (Croatia)	30–27	(Norway) Elverum Håndball	Arena Zagreb, Zagreb; Attendance: 2,500; Referees: Pichon, Reveret (FRA)
24 November 2019; 17:00	Bičanić 8	(16–13)	Guðjónsson 7	Arena Zagreb, Zagreb; Attendance: 2,500; Referees: Pichon, Reveret (FRA)
24 November 2019; 17:00	3× (yellow card) 5× (suspension)	Report	3× (yellow card) 3× (suspension)	Arena Zagreb, Zagreb; Attendance: 2,500; Referees: Pichon, Reveret (FRA)

30 November 2019; 17:30	MOL-Pick Szeged (Hungary)	33–23	(Croatia) PPD Zagreb	Városi Sportcsarnok, Szeged; Attendance: 3,200; Referees: Gousko, Repkin (BLR)
30 November 2019; 17:30	Cañellas 5	(14–7)	Gadža 7	Városi Sportcsarnok, Szeged; Attendance: 3,200; Referees: Gousko, Repkin (BLR)
30 November 2019; 17:30	3× (yellow card) 1× (suspension)	Report	3× (yellow card) 2× (suspension)	Városi Sportcsarnok, Szeged; Attendance: 3,200; Referees: Gousko, Repkin (BLR)

1 December 2019; 17:00	Paris Saint-Germain (France)	32–35	(Spain) Barça	Stade Pierre de Coubertin, Paris; Attendance: 3,346; Referees: Gubica, Milošević (CRO)
1 December 2019; 17:00	Hansen, Sagosen 8	(17–16)	Cindrić, Pálmarsson 6	Stade Pierre de Coubertin, Paris; Attendance: 3,346; Referees: Gubica, Milošević (CRO)
1 December 2019; 17:00	3× (yellow card) 6× (suspension)	Report	3× (yellow card) 2× (suspension)	Stade Pierre de Coubertin, Paris; Attendance: 3,346; Referees: Gubica, Milošević (CRO)

1 December 2019; 19:00	SG Flensburg-Handewitt (Germany)	29–32	(Denmark) Aalborg Handbold	Flens-Arena, Flensburg; Attendance: 4,406; Referees: Nikolov, Nachevski (MKD)
1 December 2019; 19:00	Johannessen 5	(15–18)	three players 7	Flens-Arena, Flensburg; Attendance: 4,406; Referees: Nikolov, Nachevski (MKD)
1 December 2019; 19:00	2× (yellow card) 3× (suspension)	Report	2× (yellow card)	Flens-Arena, Flensburg; Attendance: 4,406; Referees: Nikolov, Nachevski (MKD)

1 December 2019; 19:00	Elverum Håndball (Norway)	37–26	(Slovenia) Celje Pivovarna Laško	Terningen Arena, Elverum; Attendance: 1,910; Referees: Brunovský, Čanda (SVK)
1 December 2019; 19:00	four players 6	(21–13)	Horžen 5	Terningen Arena, Elverum; Attendance: 1,910; Referees: Brunovský, Čanda (SVK)
1 December 2019; 19:00	3× (yellow card) 1× (suspension)	Report	1× (yellow card) 4× (suspension)	Terningen Arena, Elverum; Attendance: 1,910; Referees: Brunovský, Čanda (SVK)

8 February 2020; 18:00	MOL-Pick Szeged (Hungary)	26–26	(Denmark) Aalborg Handbold	Városi Sportcsarnok, Szeged; Attendance: 3,200; Referees: Leszczyński, Piechota (POL)
8 February 2020; 18:00	Bombač 5	(13–15)	Juul, Smárason 6	Városi Sportcsarnok, Szeged; Attendance: 3,200; Referees: Leszczyński, Piechota (POL)
8 February 2020; 18:00	2× (yellow card) 1× (suspension)	Report	4× (yellow card) 4× (suspension)	Városi Sportcsarnok, Szeged; Attendance: 3,200; Referees: Leszczyński, Piechota (POL)

8 February 2020; 18:00	PPD Zagreb (Croatia)	25–26	(Germany) SG Flensburg-Handewitt	Arena Zagreb, Zagreb; Attendance: 5,364; Referees: Elíasson, Pálsson (ISL)
8 February 2020; 18:00	Šipić 8	(9–11)	Steinhauser 7	Arena Zagreb, Zagreb; Attendance: 5,364; Referees: Elíasson, Pálsson (ISL)
8 February 2020; 18:00	3× (yellow card) 7× (suspension)	Report	3× (yellow card) 4× (suspension)	Arena Zagreb, Zagreb; Attendance: 5,364; Referees: Elíasson, Pálsson (ISL)

9 February 2020; 17:00	Celje Pivovarna Laško (Slovenia)	29–33	(France) Paris Saint-Germain	Zlatorog Arena, Celje; Attendance: 4,700; Referees: Zotin, Volodkov (RUS)
9 February 2020; 17:00	Kodrin 5	(13–17)	Syprzak 9	Zlatorog Arena, Celje; Attendance: 4,700; Referees: Zotin, Volodkov (RUS)
9 February 2020; 17:00	3× (yellow card) 2× (suspension)	Report	3× (yellow card) 2× (suspension)	Zlatorog Arena, Celje; Attendance: 4,700; Referees: Zotin, Volodkov (RUS)

9 February 2020; 19:00	Elverum Håndball (Norway)	26–30	(Spain) Barça	Terningen Arena, Elverum; Attendance: 2,507; Referees: Konjičanin, Konjičanin (BIH)
9 February 2020; 19:00	Fredriksen 5	(14–16)	Ariño, Gómez 6	Terningen Arena, Elverum; Attendance: 2,507; Referees: Konjičanin, Konjičanin (BIH)
9 February 2020; 19:00	2× (yellow card) 3× (suspension)	Report	1× (yellow card) 1× (suspension)	Terningen Arena, Elverum; Attendance: 2,507; Referees: Konjičanin, Konjičanin (BIH)

15 February 2020; 17:30	Elverum Håndball (Norway)	28–34	(Germany) SG Flensburg-Handewitt	Håkons Hall, Lillehammer; Attendance: 9,312; Referees: Brunner, Salah (SUI)
15 February 2020; 17:30	Blonz 9	(14–15)	Steinhauser 7	Håkons Hall, Lillehammer; Attendance: 9,312; Referees: Brunner, Salah (SUI)
15 February 2020; 17:30	1× (yellow card) 2× (suspension)	Report	2× (yellow card) 3× (suspension)	Håkons Hall, Lillehammer; Attendance: 9,312; Referees: Brunner, Salah (SUI)

15 February 2020; 20:00	Barça (Spain)	32–23	(Croatia) PPD Zagreb	Palau Blaugrana, Barcelona; Attendance: 3,215; Referees: Mandák, Rudinský (SVK)
15 February 2020; 20:00	Pálmarsson, Tomás 6	(17–9)	Božović 6	Palau Blaugrana, Barcelona; Attendance: 3,215; Referees: Mandák, Rudinský (SVK)
15 February 2020; 20:00	2× (yellow card) 1× (suspension)	Report	2× (yellow card) 3× (suspension)	Palau Blaugrana, Barcelona; Attendance: 3,215; Referees: Mandák, Rudinský (SVK)

16 February 2020; 16:50	Aalborg (Denmark)	28–24	(Slovenia) Celje Pivovarna Laško	Jutlander Bank Arena, Aalborg; Attendance: 4,640; Referees: Pichon, Reveret (FRA)
16 February 2020; 16:50	Strandgaard 6	(13–9)	Horžen, Leban 5	Jutlander Bank Arena, Aalborg; Attendance: 4,640; Referees: Pichon, Reveret (FRA)
16 February 2020; 16:50	2× (yellow card) 3× (suspension)	Report	1× (yellow card) 6× (suspension)	Jutlander Bank Arena, Aalborg; Attendance: 4,640; Referees: Pichon, Reveret (FRA)

16 February 2020; 17:00	MOL-Pick Szeged (Hungary)	32–29	(France) Paris Saint-Germain	Városi Sportcsarnok, Szeged; Attendance: 3,200; Referees: Madsen, Mortensen (DEN)
16 February 2020; 17:00	Cañellas 10	(15–18)	Hansen 7	Városi Sportcsarnok, Szeged; Attendance: 3,200; Referees: Madsen, Mortensen (DEN)
16 February 2020; 17:00	1× (yellow card) 3× (suspension) 1× (red card)	Report	1× (yellow card) 3× (suspension)	Városi Sportcsarnok, Szeged; Attendance: 3,200; Referees: Madsen, Mortensen (DEN)

19 February 2020; 19:00	SG Flensburg-Handewitt (Germany)	34–26	(Hungary) MOL-Pick Szeged	Flens-Arena, Flensburg; Attendance: 4,355; Referees: Gubica, Milošević (CRO)
19 February 2020; 19:00	Jurecki 6	(17–11)	Cañellas 5	Flens-Arena, Flensburg; Attendance: 4,355; Referees: Gubica, Milošević (CRO)
19 February 2020; 19:00	1× (yellow card) 5× (suspension)	Report	2× (yellow card) 6× (suspension)	Flens-Arena, Flensburg; Attendance: 4,355; Referees: Gubica, Milošević (CRO)

22 February 2020; 17:15	Paris Saint-Germain (France)	31–25	(Norway) Elverum Håndball	Stade Pierre de Coubertin, Paris; Attendance: 3,010; Referees: Stark, Ştefan (ROU)
22 February 2020; 17:15	Sagosen 8	(17–13)	Fredriksen 6	Stade Pierre de Coubertin, Paris; Attendance: 3,010; Referees: Stark, Ştefan (ROU)
22 February 2020; 17:15	1× (yellow card) 3× (suspension)	Report	3× (yellow card) 4× (suspension)	Stade Pierre de Coubertin, Paris; Attendance: 3,010; Referees: Stark, Ştefan (ROU)

22 February 2020; 18:00	PPD Zagreb (Croatia)	31–30	(Denmark) Aalborg Håndbold	Arena Zagreb, Zagreb; Attendance: 2,134; Referees: Andorka, Hucker (HUN)
22 February 2020; 18:00	Gadža 9	(16–15)	Smárason 7	Arena Zagreb, Zagreb; Attendance: 2,134; Referees: Andorka, Hucker (HUN)
22 February 2020; 18:00	2× (yellow card) 6× (suspension)	Report	1× (yellow card) 2× (suspension) 1× (red card)	Arena Zagreb, Zagreb; Attendance: 2,134; Referees: Andorka, Hucker (HUN)

23 February 2020; 17:00	Celje Pivovarna Laško (Slovenia)	25–37	(Spain) Barça	Zlatorog Arena, Celje; Attendance: 5,400; Referees: Pavićević, Ražnatović (MNE)
23 February 2020; 17:00	Razgor 9	(14–19)	Dolenec 7	Zlatorog Arena, Celje; Attendance: 5,400; Referees: Pavićević, Ražnatović (MNE)
23 February 2020; 17:00	2× (yellow card) 2× (suspension)	Report	3× (yellow card) 4× (suspension)	Zlatorog Arena, Celje; Attendance: 5,400; Referees: Pavićević, Ražnatović (MNE)

26 February 2020; 19:00	SG Flensburg-Handewitt (Germany)	29–26	(Slovenia) Celje Pivovarna Laško	Flens-Arena, Flensburg; Attendance: 4,221; Referees: López, Ramírez (ESP)
26 February 2020; 19:00	Golla 8	(15–12)	Cokan, Razgor 6	Flens-Arena, Flensburg; Attendance: 4,221; Referees: López, Ramírez (ESP)
26 February 2020; 19:00	1× (yellow card) 2× (suspension)	Report	1× (yellow card) 1× (suspension)	Flens-Arena, Flensburg; Attendance: 4,221; Referees: López, Ramírez (ESP)

29 February 2020; 20:00	Barça (Spain)	30–28	(Hungary) MOL-Pick Szeged	Palau Blaugrana, Barcelona; Attendance: 3,658; Referees: Lah, Sok (SLO)
29 February 2020; 20:00	Cindrić, Dolenec 7	(13–15)	Bodó 7	Palau Blaugrana, Barcelona; Attendance: 3,658; Referees: Lah, Sok (SLO)
29 February 2020; 20:00	2× (yellow card) 4× (suspension)	Report	2× (yellow card) 5× (suspension)	Palau Blaugrana, Barcelona; Attendance: 3,658; Referees: Lah, Sok (SLO)

1 March 2020; 16:50	Aalborg (Denmark)	30–28	(Norway) Elverum Håndball	Jutlander Bank Arena, Aalborg; Attendance: 4,782; Referees: Álvarez, Bustamente (ESP)
1 March 2020; 16:50	Strandgaard 8	(18–11)	Sandell 7	Jutlander Bank Arena, Aalborg; Attendance: 4,782; Referees: Álvarez, Bustamente (ESP)
1 March 2020; 16:50	2× (yellow card) 4× (suspension)	Report	3× (yellow card) 5× (suspension)	Jutlander Bank Arena, Aalborg; Attendance: 4,782; Referees: Álvarez, Bustamente (ESP)

1 March 2020; 17:00	Paris Saint-Germain (France)	37–26	(Croatia) PPD Zagreb	Stade Pierre de Coubertin, Paris; Attendance: 3,010; Referees: Leandersson, Lindroos (FIN)
1 March 2020; 17:00	Sagosen 9	(17–12)	Božović 6	Stade Pierre de Coubertin, Paris; Attendance: 3,010; Referees: Leandersson, Lindroos (FIN)
1 March 2020; 17:00	2× (yellow card) 5× (suspension)	Report	2× (yellow card) 5× (suspension)	Stade Pierre de Coubertin, Paris; Attendance: 3,010; Referees: Leandersson, Lindroos (FIN)

=== Group B ===
Pos	Team	Pld	W	D	L	GF	GA	GD	Pts	Qualification
1	(Germany) THW Kiel	14	9	2	3	437	398	+39	20 (Note: THW Kiel 66–59 Telekom Veszprém)	Quarterfinals
2	(Hungary) Telekom Veszprém	14	10	0	4	448	386	+62	20	First knockout round
3	(Poland) PGE Vive Kielce	14	8	2	4	421	389	+32	18	First knockout round
4	(France) Montpellier Handball	14	8	1	5	386	375	+11	17	First knockout round
5	(Portugal) FC Porto Sofarma	14	6	2	6	400	410	−10	14	First knockout round
6	(North Macedonia) Vardar	14	5	1	8	396	444	−48	11	First knockout round
7	(Belarus) HC Meshkov Brest	14	4	0	10	401	431	−30	8	
8	(Ukraine) HC Motor Zaporizhzhia	14	1	2	11	406	462	−56	4	

Source: EHF
Rules for classification: Tiebreakers
Notes:

14 September 2019; 17:15	Montpellier Handball (France)	31–33	(North Macedonia) Vardar	Palais des sports René-Bougnol, Montpellier; Attendance: 2,700; Referees: Gjeding, Hansen (DEN)
14 September 2019; 17:15	Porte 7	(17–16)	Skube 7	Palais des sports René-Bougnol, Montpellier; Attendance: 2,700; Referees: Gjeding, Hansen (DEN)
14 September 2019; 17:15	1× (yellow card) 5× (suspension)	Report	5× (suspension)	Palais des sports René-Bougnol, Montpellier; Attendance: 2,700; Referees: Gjeding, Hansen (DEN)

14 September 2019; 19:30	FC Porto Sofarma (Portugal)	27–25	(Belarus) HC Meshkov Brest	Dragão Caixa, Porto; Attendance: 1,196; Referees: Pichon, Reveret (FRA)
14 September 2019; 19:30	Branquinho 8	(9–15)	Ðukić 10	Dragão Caixa, Porto; Attendance: 1,196; Referees: Pichon, Reveret (FRA)
14 September 2019; 19:30	1× (yellow card) 4× (suspension)	Report	1× (yellow card) 2× (suspension)	Dragão Caixa, Porto; Attendance: 1,196; Referees: Pichon, Reveret (FRA)

15 September 2019; 17:00	Telekom Veszprém (Hungary)	40–28	(Ukraine) HC Motor Zaporizhzhia	Veszprém Aréna, Veszprém; Attendance: 5,019; Referees: Marín, García (ESP)
15 September 2019; 17:00	Gajič, Tønnesen 6	(17–13)	Malašinskas, Pukhouski 6	Veszprém Aréna, Veszprém; Attendance: 5,019; Referees: Marín, García (ESP)
15 September 2019; 17:00	4× (suspension)	Report	5× (yellow card) 2× (suspension) 2× (red card)	Veszprém Aréna, Veszprém; Attendance: 5,019; Referees: Marín, García (ESP)

15 September 2019; 19:00	THW Kiel (Germany)	30–30	(Poland) PGE Vive Kielce	Sparkassen-Arena, Kiel; Attendance: 8,223; Referees: Lah, Sok (SLO)
15 September 2019; 19:00	Bilyk 7	(14–15)	Dujshebaev, Kulesh 5	Sparkassen-Arena, Kiel; Attendance: 8,223; Referees: Lah, Sok (SLO)
15 September 2019; 19:00	2× (yellow card) 7× (suspension) 1× (red card)	Report	2× (yellow card) 8× (suspension)	Sparkassen-Arena, Kiel; Attendance: 8,223; Referees: Lah, Sok (SLO)

21 September 2019; 17:30	HC Meshkov Brest (Belarus)	25–27	(France) Montpellier Handball	Sportshall Victoria, Brest; Referees: Geipel, Helbig (GER)
21 September 2019; 17:30	Ðukić, Panić 6	(13–12)	Richardson 7	Sportshall Victoria, Brest; Referees: Geipel, Helbig (GER)
21 September 2019; 17:30	2× (yellow card) 2× (suspension)	Report	2× (yellow card) 3× (suspension)	Sportshall Victoria, Brest; Referees: Geipel, Helbig (GER)

21 September 2019; 17:30	Telekom Veszprém (Hungary)	31–37	(Germany) THW Kiel	Veszprém Aréna, Veszprém; Attendance: 5,019; Referees: Pavićević, Ražnatović (MNE)
21 September 2019; 17:30	Nilsson, Omar 5	(13–16)	Reinkind 8	Veszprém Aréna, Veszprém; Attendance: 5,019; Referees: Pavićević, Ražnatović (MNE)
21 September 2019; 17:30	3× (yellow card) 4× (suspension)	Report	3× (yellow card) 2× (suspension)	Veszprém Aréna, Veszprém; Attendance: 5,019; Referees: Pavićević, Ražnatović (MNE)

22 September 2019; 17:00	Vardar (North Macedonia)	32–27	(Portugal) FC Porto Sofarma	Jane Sandanski Arena, Skopje; Attendance: 4,800; Referees: Brkic, Jusufhodzic (AUT)
22 September 2019; 17:00	Čupić, Krištopāns 7	(14–16)	Branquinho 6	Jane Sandanski Arena, Skopje; Attendance: 4,800; Referees: Brkic, Jusufhodzic (AUT)
22 September 2019; 17:00	2× (yellow card) 3× (suspension)	Report	3× (yellow card) 7× (suspension)	Jane Sandanski Arena, Skopje; Attendance: 4,800; Referees: Brkic, Jusufhodzic (AUT)

22 September 2019; 20:00	PGE Vive Kielce (Poland)	33–26	(Ukraine) HC Motor Zaporizhzhia	Hala Legionów, Kielce; Attendance: 4,000; Referees: Brunner, Salah (SUI)
22 September 2019; 20:00	Karalek 6	(22–11)	Pukhouski, Vujović 5	Hala Legionów, Kielce; Attendance: 4,000; Referees: Brunner, Salah (SUI)
22 September 2019; 20:00	3× (yellow card) 2× (suspension)	Report	1× (yellow card) 5× (suspension)	Hala Legionów, Kielce; Attendance: 4,000; Referees: Brunner, Salah (SUI)

25 September 2019; 19:00	THW Kiel (Germany)	31–23	(Belarus) HC Meshkov Brest	Sparkassen-Arena, Kiel; Attendance: 7,506; Referees: Madsen, Mortensen (DEN)
25 September 2019; 19:00	Dahmke, Wiencek 5	(13–12)	Panić 6	Sparkassen-Arena, Kiel; Attendance: 7,506; Referees: Madsen, Mortensen (DEN)
25 September 2019; 19:00	1× (suspension)	Report	1× (yellow card) 2× (suspension)	Sparkassen-Arena, Kiel; Attendance: 7,506; Referees: Madsen, Mortensen (DEN)

28 September 2019; 20:00	FC Porto Sofarma (Portugal)	33–30	(Poland) PGE Vive Kielce	Dragão Caixa, Porto; Attendance: 1,701; Referees: Baďura, Ondogrecula (SVK)
28 September 2019; 20:00	Areia 8	(15–12)	Janc 7	Dragão Caixa, Porto; Attendance: 1,701; Referees: Baďura, Ondogrecula (SVK)
28 September 2019; 20:00	3× (yellow card) 5× (suspension)	Report	2× (yellow card) 2× (suspension)	Dragão Caixa, Porto; Attendance: 1,701; Referees: Baďura, Ondogrecula (SVK)

29 September 2019; 17:00	HC Motor Zaporizhzhia (Ukraine)	30–31	(North Macedonia) Vardar	Sport Palace Yunost, Zaporizhzhia; Attendance: 2,600; Referees: Jurinović, Mrvica (CRO)
29 September 2019; 17:00	Soroka 8	(18–16)	Dibirov 10	Sport Palace Yunost, Zaporizhzhia; Attendance: 2,600; Referees: Jurinović, Mrvica (CRO)
29 September 2019; 17:00	3× (yellow card) 4× (suspension) 1× (red card)	Report	2× (yellow card) 3× (suspension)	Sport Palace Yunost, Zaporizhzhia; Attendance: 2,600; Referees: Jurinović, Mrvica (CRO)

29 September 2019; 19:00	Montpellier Handball (France)	23–18	(Hungary) Telekom Veszprém	Sud de France Arena, Montpellier; Attendance: 3,000; Referees: Zotin, Volodkov (RUS)
29 September 2019; 19:00	Richardson 8	(11–10)	Mahé 5	Sud de France Arena, Montpellier; Attendance: 3,000; Referees: Zotin, Volodkov (RUS)
29 September 2019; 19:00	3× (yellow card) 2× (suspension)	Report	3× (yellow card) 3× (suspension)	Sud de France Arena, Montpellier; Attendance: 3,000; Referees: Zotin, Volodkov (RUS)

12 October 2019; 17:30	Vardar (North Macedonia)	20–31	(Germany) THW Kiel	Jane Sandanski Arena, Skopje; Attendance: 5,500; Referees: Brunner, Salah (SUI)
12 October 2019; 17:30	Dibirov 5	(4–16)	Duvnjak, Pekeler 6	Jane Sandanski Arena, Skopje; Attendance: 5,500; Referees: Brunner, Salah (SUI)
12 October 2019; 17:30	2× (yellow card) 1× (suspension)	Report	2× (yellow card) 3× (suspension)	Jane Sandanski Arena, Skopje; Attendance: 5,500; Referees: Brunner, Salah (SUI)

12 October 2019; 18:00	PGE Vive Kielce (Poland)	27–29	(France) Montpellier Handball	Hala Legionów, Kielce; Attendance: 4,199; Referees: Gubica, Milošević (CRO)
12 October 2019; 18:00	Janc 7	(12–14)	Soussi, Villeminot 6	Hala Legionów, Kielce; Attendance: 4,199; Referees: Gubica, Milošević (CRO)
12 October 2019; 18:00	1× (yellow card) 3× (suspension)	Report	2× (yellow card) 3× (suspension)	Hala Legionów, Kielce; Attendance: 4,199; Referees: Gubica, Milošević (CRO)

12 October 2019; 18:30	HC Meshkov Brest (Belarus)	33–31	(Ukraine) HC Motor Zaporizhzhia	Sportshall Victoria, Brest; Attendance: 2,700; Referees: Jørum, Kleven (NOR)
12 October 2019; 18:30	Accambray 6	(16–19)	Malašinskas 9	Sportshall Victoria, Brest; Attendance: 2,700; Referees: Jørum, Kleven (NOR)
12 October 2019; 18:30	1× (yellow card) 3× (suspension)	Report	1× (yellow card) 1× (suspension)	Sportshall Victoria, Brest; Attendance: 2,700; Referees: Jørum, Kleven (NOR)

13 October 2019; 15:00	Telekom Veszprém (Hungary)	38–28	(Portugal) FC Porto Sofarma	Veszprém Aréna, Veszprém; Attendance: 4,809; Referees: Sondors, Līcis (LAT)
13 October 2019; 15:00	Nilsson 8	(19–16)	Iturriza 6	Veszprém Aréna, Veszprém; Attendance: 4,809; Referees: Sondors, Līcis (LAT)
13 October 2019; 15:00	2× (yellow card) 3× (suspension)	Report	3× (yellow card) 2× (suspension)	Veszprém Aréna, Veszprém; Attendance: 4,809; Referees: Sondors, Līcis (LAT)

19 October 2019; 17:00	HC Meshkov Brest (Belarus)	27–31	(Poland) PGE Vive Kielce	Sportshall Victoria, Brest; Attendance: 3,100; Referees: Horáček, Novotný (CZE)
19 October 2019; 17:00	Accambray 6	(9–15)	Kulesh 6	Sportshall Victoria, Brest; Attendance: 3,100; Referees: Horáček, Novotný (CZE)
19 October 2019; 17:00	2× (yellow card) 5× (suspension) 1× (red card)	Report	2× (yellow card) 6× (suspension)	Sportshall Victoria, Brest; Attendance: 3,100; Referees: Horáček, Novotný (CZE)

19 October 2019; 17:15	Montpellier Handball (France)	30–33	(Germany) THW Kiel	Sud de France Arena, Montpellier; Referees: Mažeika, Gatelis (LTU)
19 October 2019; 17:15	Grébille 8	(16–17)	Nilsson 11	Sud de France Arena, Montpellier; Referees: Mažeika, Gatelis (LTU)
19 October 2019; 17:15	3× (yellow card) 2× (suspension)	Report	1× (yellow card) 1× (suspension)	Sud de France Arena, Montpellier; Referees: Mažeika, Gatelis (LTU)

19 October 2019; 17:30	Telekom Veszprém (Hungary)	39–30	(North Macedonia) Vardar	Veszprém Aréna, Veszprém; Referees: Pichon, Reveret (FRA)
19 October 2019; 17:30	Lauge 8	(21–17)	Dibirov 8	Veszprém Aréna, Veszprém; Referees: Pichon, Reveret (FRA)
19 October 2019; 17:30	2× (yellow card) 5× (suspension) 1× (red card)	Report	5× (yellow card) 2× (suspension) 1× (red card)	Veszprém Aréna, Veszprém; Referees: Pichon, Reveret (FRA)

19 October 2019; 19:30	FC Porto Sofarma (Portugal)	35–35	(Ukraine) HC Motor Zaporizhzhia	Dragão Caixa, Porto; Attendance: 1,465; Referees: Madsen, Mortensen (DEN)
19 October 2019; 19:30	Gomes 8	(15–15)	Pukhouski 12	Dragão Caixa, Porto; Attendance: 1,465; Referees: Madsen, Mortensen (DEN)
19 October 2019; 19:30	1× (yellow card) 4× (suspension)	Report	3× (yellow card) 6× (suspension)	Dragão Caixa, Porto; Attendance: 1,465; Referees: Madsen, Mortensen (DEN)

2 November 2019; 15:00	PGE Vive Kielce (Poland)	34–33	(Hungary) Telekom Veszprém	Hala Legionów, Kielce; Attendance: 4,200; Referees: Gjeding, Hansen (DEN)
2 November 2019; 15:00	A. Dujshebaev 11	(17–17)	Gajić 7	Hala Legionów, Kielce; Attendance: 4,200; Referees: Gjeding, Hansen (DEN)
2 November 2019; 15:00	2× (yellow card) 5× (suspension)	Report	2× (yellow card) 7× (suspension)	Hala Legionów, Kielce; Attendance: 4,200; Referees: Gjeding, Hansen (DEN)

2 November 2019; 19:30	FC Porto Sofarma (Portugal)	23–23	(France) Montpellier Handball	Dragão Caixa, Porto; Attendance: 1,989; Referees: López, Ramírez (ESP)
2 November 2019; 19:30	Iturriza 4	(11–10)	Duarte 6	Dragão Caixa, Porto; Attendance: 1,989; Referees: López, Ramírez (ESP)
2 November 2019; 19:30	4× (yellow card) 1× (suspension) 1× (red card)	Report	5× (yellow card) 1× (suspension) 1× (red card)	Dragão Caixa, Porto; Attendance: 1,989; Referees: López, Ramírez (ESP)

3 November 2019; 17:00	Vardar (North Macedonia)	36–31	(Belarus) HC Meshkov Brest	Jane Sandanski Arena, Skopje; Attendance: 4,900; Referees: Elíasson, Pálsson (ISL)
3 November 2019; 17:00	Krištopāns 9	(19–17)	Vailupau 9	Jane Sandanski Arena, Skopje; Attendance: 4,900; Referees: Elíasson, Pálsson (ISL)
3 November 2019; 17:00	3× (yellow card) 4× (suspension)	Report	3× (yellow card) 8× (suspension)	Jane Sandanski Arena, Skopje; Attendance: 4,900; Referees: Elíasson, Pálsson (ISL)

3 November 2019; 17:00	HC Motor Zaporizhzhia (Ukraine)	27–30	(Germany) THW Kiel	Sport Palace Yunost, Zaporizhzhia; Attendance: 3,100; Referees: Kurtagic, Wetterwik (SWE)
3 November 2019; 17:00	Jaanimaa, Soroka 5	(13–15)	Reinkind 7	Sport Palace Yunost, Zaporizhzhia; Attendance: 3,100; Referees: Kurtagic, Wetterwik (SWE)
3 November 2019; 17:00	2× (yellow card) 2× (suspension)	Report	1× (yellow card) 1× (suspension)	Sport Palace Yunost, Zaporizhzhia; Attendance: 3,100; Referees: Kurtagic, Wetterwik (SWE)

9 November 2019; 17:30	Vardar (North Macedonia)	28–28	(Poland) PGE Vive Kielce	Jane Sandanski Arena, Skopje; Attendance: 4,900; Referees: Schulze, Tönnies (GER)
9 November 2019; 17:30	Skube 7	(17–16)	Janc 7	Jane Sandanski Arena, Skopje; Attendance: 4,900; Referees: Schulze, Tönnies (GER)
9 November 2019; 17:30	2× (yellow card) 4× (suspension)	Report	6× (suspension)	Jane Sandanski Arena, Skopje; Attendance: 4,900; Referees: Schulze, Tönnies (GER)

9 November 2019; 17:30	HC Meshkov Brest (Belarus)	30–37	(Hungary) Telekom Veszprém	Sportshall Victoria, Brest; Attendance: 2,700; Referees: Gubica, Milošević (CRO)
9 November 2019; 17:30	Vailupau 5	(17–20)	Gajić, Nenadić 8	Sportshall Victoria, Brest; Attendance: 2,700; Referees: Gubica, Milošević (CRO)
9 November 2019; 17:30	4× (yellow card) 4× (suspension)	Report	1× (yellow card) 2× (suspension)	Sportshall Victoria, Brest; Attendance: 2,700; Referees: Gubica, Milošević (CRO)

10 November 2019; 17:00	HC Motor Zaporizhzhia (Ukraine)	25–26	(France) Montpellier Handball	Sport Palace Yunost, Zaporizhzhia; Attendance: 2,670; Referees: Lah, Sok (SLO)
10 November 2019; 17:00	Babichev 7	(17–12)	Descat, Truchanovicius 5	Sport Palace Yunost, Zaporizhzhia; Attendance: 2,670; Referees: Lah, Sok (SLO)
10 November 2019; 17:00	3× (yellow card) 5× (suspension)	Report	2× (yellow card) 5× (suspension)	Sport Palace Yunost, Zaporizhzhia; Attendance: 2,670; Referees: Lah, Sok (SLO)

10 November 2019; 19:00	THW Kiel (Germany)	27–28	(Portugal) FC Porto Sofarma	Sparkassen-Arena, Kiel; Attendance: 8,011; Referees: Jørum, Kleven (NOR)
10 November 2019; 19:00	Ekberg 7	(14–13)	Iturriza 6	Sparkassen-Arena, Kiel; Attendance: 8,011; Referees: Jørum, Kleven (NOR)
10 November 2019; 19:00	1× (yellow card) 3× (suspension)	Report	2× (yellow card) 4× (suspension) 1× (red card)	Sparkassen-Arena, Kiel; Attendance: 8,011; Referees: Jørum, Kleven (NOR)

13 November 2019; 20:00	FC Porto Sofarma (Portugal)	29–30	(Germany) THW Kiel	Dragão Caixa, Porto; Attendance: 1,916; Referees: Elíasson, Pálsson (ISL)
13 November 2019; 20:00	Iturriza 6	(16–14)	M. Landin Jacobsen 9	Dragão Caixa, Porto; Attendance: 1,916; Referees: Elíasson, Pálsson (ISL)
13 November 2019; 20:00	3× (yellow card) 3× (suspension)	Report	4× (yellow card) 4× (suspension)	Dragão Caixa, Porto; Attendance: 1,916; Referees: Elíasson, Pálsson (ISL)

16 November 2019; 17:30	Telekom Veszprém (Hungary)	31–25	(Belarus) HC Meshkov Brest	Veszprém Aréna, Veszprém; Attendance: 5,019; Referees: Brunovský, Čanda (SVK)
16 November 2019; 17:30	three players 5	(14–14)	Accambray 5	Veszprém Aréna, Veszprém; Attendance: 5,019; Referees: Brunovský, Čanda (SVK)
16 November 2019; 17:30	1× (yellow card) 4× (suspension)	Report	2× (yellow card) 1× (suspension)	Veszprém Aréna, Veszprém; Attendance: 5,019; Referees: Brunovský, Čanda (SVK)

16 November 2019; 18:00	PGE Vive Kielce (Poland)	35–25	(North Macedonia) Vardar	Hala Legionów, Kielce; Attendance: 4,200; Referees: Jørum, Kleven (NOR)
16 November 2019; 18:00	Karačić, Karalek 6	(17–14)	Dibirov 9	Hala Legionów, Kielce; Attendance: 4,200; Referees: Jørum, Kleven (NOR)
16 November 2019; 18:00	2× (yellow card) 4× (suspension)	Report	1× (yellow card) 2× (suspension)	Hala Legionów, Kielce; Attendance: 4,200; Referees: Jørum, Kleven (NOR)

17 November 2019; 19:00	Montpellier Handball (France)	34–30	(Ukraine) HC Motor Zaporizhzhia	Palais des sports René-Bougnol, Montpellier; Attendance: 3,000; Referees: Pavićević, Ražnatović (MNE)
17 November 2019; 19:00	Descat, Lenne 8	(16–15)	Soroka 5	Palais des sports René-Bougnol, Montpellier; Attendance: 3,000; Referees: Pavićević, Ražnatović (MNE)
17 November 2019; 19:00	1× (yellow card) 4× (suspension)	Report	1× (yellow card) 7× (suspension)	Palais des sports René-Bougnol, Montpellier; Attendance: 3,000; Referees: Pavićević, Ražnatović (MNE)

20 November 2019; 19:00	THW Kiel (Germany)	32–32	(Ukraine) HC Motor Zaporizhzhia	Sparkassen-Arena, Kiel; Attendance: 7,618; Referees: Baďura, Ondogrecula (SVK)
20 November 2019; 19:00	Ekberg 9	(16–17)	Pukhouski 10	Sparkassen-Arena, Kiel; Attendance: 7,618; Referees: Baďura, Ondogrecula (SVK)
20 November 2019; 19:00	2× (yellow card) 1× (suspension)	Report	2× (yellow card) 5× (suspension)	Sparkassen-Arena, Kiel; Attendance: 7,618; Referees: Baďura, Ondogrecula (SVK)

23 November 2019; 17:15	Montpellier Handball (France)	22–27	(Portugal) FC Porto Sofarma	Palais des sports René-Bougnol, Montpellier; Attendance: 3,010; Referees: Jurinović, Mrvica (CRO)
23 November 2019; 17:15	Simonet, Villeminot 5	(10–14)	Martins 7	Palais des sports René-Bougnol, Montpellier; Attendance: 3,010; Referees: Jurinović, Mrvica (CRO)
23 November 2019; 17:15	2× (yellow card) 1× (suspension)	Report	2× (yellow card) 2× (suspension)	Palais des sports René-Bougnol, Montpellier; Attendance: 3,010; Referees: Jurinović, Mrvica (CRO)

23 November 2019; 17:30	HC Meshkov Brest (Belarus)	31–22	(North Macedonia) Vardar	Sportshall Victoria, Brest; Attendance: 2,400; Referees: Pavićević, Ražnatović (MNE)
23 November 2019; 17:30	Vailupau 12	(12–13)	Stoilov 6	Sportshall Victoria, Brest; Attendance: 2,400; Referees: Pavićević, Ražnatović (MNE)
23 November 2019; 17:30	1× (yellow card) 2× (suspension)	Report	2× (yellow card) 3× (suspension)	Sportshall Victoria, Brest; Attendance: 2,400; Referees: Pavićević, Ražnatović (MNE)

23 November 2019; 17:30	Telekom Veszprém (Hungary)	28–24	(Poland) PGE Vive Kielce	Veszprém Aréna, Veszprém; Attendance: 5,125; Referees: Mažeika, Gatelis (LTU)
23 November 2019; 17:30	Nilsson 5	(13–15)	Karalek 6	Veszprém Aréna, Veszprém; Attendance: 5,125; Referees: Mažeika, Gatelis (LTU)
23 November 2019; 17:30	2× (yellow card) 8× (suspension)	Report	3× (yellow card) 3× (suspension)	Veszprém Aréna, Veszprém; Attendance: 5,125; Referees: Mažeika, Gatelis (LTU)

27 November 2019; 18:00	HC Motor Zaporizhzhia (Ukraine)	33–29	(Portugal) FC Porto Sofarma	Sport Palace Yunost, Zaporizhzhia; Attendance: 1,800; Referees: Boričič, Marković (SRB)
27 November 2019; 18:00	Soroka 10	(19–16)	Branquinho, Gomes 6	Sport Palace Yunost, Zaporizhzhia; Attendance: 1,800; Referees: Boričič, Marković (SRB)
27 November 2019; 18:00	2× (yellow card) 5× (suspension)	Report	3× (yellow card) 6× (suspension) 1× (red card)	Sport Palace Yunost, Zaporizhzhia; Attendance: 1,800; Referees: Boričič, Marković (SRB)

30 November 2019; 15:00	PGE Vive Kielce (Poland)	30–24	(Belarus) HC Meshkov Brest	Hala Legionów, Kielce; Attendance: 4,200; Referees: Kurtagic, Wetterwik (SWE)
30 November 2019; 15:00	Janc 7	(12–11)	Accambray 6	Hala Legionów, Kielce; Attendance: 4,200; Referees: Kurtagic, Wetterwik (SWE)
30 November 2019; 15:00	3× (yellow card) 6× (suspension)	Report	1× (yellow card) 4× (suspension)	Hala Legionów, Kielce; Attendance: 4,200; Referees: Kurtagic, Wetterwik (SWE)

30 November 2019; 17:30	THW Kiel (Germany)	33–32	(France) Montpellier Handball	Sparkassen-Arena, Kiel; Attendance: 9,318; Referees: Horáček, Novotný (CZE)
30 November 2019; 17:30	Bilyk 8	(16–19)	Porte 7	Sparkassen-Arena, Kiel; Attendance: 9,318; Referees: Horáček, Novotný (CZE)
30 November 2019; 17:30	1× (yellow card) 2× (suspension)	Report	2× (yellow card) 8× (suspension) 1× (red card)	Sparkassen-Arena, Kiel; Attendance: 9,318; Referees: Horáček, Novotný (CZE)

1 December 2019; 17:00	Vardar (North Macedonia)	29–38	(Hungary) Telekom Veszprém	Jane Sandanski Arena, Skopje; Attendance: 5,500; Referees: Madsen, Mortensen (DEN)
1 December 2019; 17:00	Atman 7	(15–22)	Nenadić 11	Jane Sandanski Arena, Skopje; Attendance: 5,500; Referees: Madsen, Mortensen (DEN)
1 December 2019; 17:00	2× (yellow card) 1× (suspension)	Report	4× (suspension) 1× (red card)	Jane Sandanski Arena, Skopje; Attendance: 5,500; Referees: Madsen, Mortensen (DEN)

5 February 2020; 19:00	THW Kiel (Germany)	34–23	(North Macedonia) Vardar	Sparkassen-Arena, Kiel; Attendance: 9,024; Referees: Sondors, Līcis (LAT)
5 February 2020; 19:00	Ekberg 8	(18–14)	Krištopāns 6	Sparkassen-Arena, Kiel; Attendance: 9,024; Referees: Sondors, Līcis (LAT)
5 February 2020; 19:00	3× (yellow card) 3× (suspension)	Report	3× (yellow card) 3× (suspension)	Sparkassen-Arena, Kiel; Attendance: 9,024; Referees: Sondors, Līcis (LAT)

8 February 2020; 16:00	FC Porto Sofarma (Portugal)	24–31	(Hungary) Telekom Veszprém	Dragão Caixa, Porto; Attendance: 1,726; Referees: Erdoğan, Özdeniz (TUR)
8 February 2020; 16:00	Branquinho 6	(9–14)	Borozan 7	Dragão Caixa, Porto; Attendance: 1,726; Referees: Erdoğan, Özdeniz (TUR)
8 February 2020; 16:00	2× (yellow card) 3× (suspension) 1× (red card)	Report	1× (yellow card) 3× (suspension)	Dragão Caixa, Porto; Attendance: 1,726; Referees: Erdoğan, Özdeniz (TUR)

8 February 2020; 17:15	Montpellier Handball (France)	25–24	(Poland) PGE Vive Kielce	Palais des sports René-Bougnol, Montpellier; Attendance: 3,000; Referees: Nikolić, Stojković (SRB)
8 February 2020; 17:15	Descat 10	(12–14)	Kulesh, Moryto 5	Palais des sports René-Bougnol, Montpellier; Attendance: 3,000; Referees: Nikolić, Stojković (SRB)
8 February 2020; 17:15	2× (yellow card) 5× (suspension)	Report	1× (yellow card) 4× (suspension)	Palais des sports René-Bougnol, Montpellier; Attendance: 3,000; Referees: Nikolić, Stojković (SRB)

9 February 2020; 17:00	HC Motor Zaporizhzhia (Ukraine)	33–36	(Belarus) HC Meshkov Brest	Sport Palace Yunost, Zaporizhzhia; Attendance: 2,250; Referees: Vešović, Mitrović (MNE)
9 February 2020; 17:00	Malašinskas, Pukhouski 6	(17–18)	Shkurinskiy 10	Sport Palace Yunost, Zaporizhzhia; Attendance: 2,250; Referees: Vešović, Mitrović (MNE)
9 February 2020; 17:00	2× (yellow card) 5× (suspension)	Report	1× (yellow card) 2× (suspension) 1× (red card)	Sport Palace Yunost, Zaporizhzhia; Attendance: 2,250; Referees: Vešović, Mitrović (MNE)

12 February 2020; 19:00	THW Kiel (Germany)	29–28	(Hungary) Telekom Veszprém	Sparkassen-Arena, Kiel; Attendance: 10,285; Referees: Jurinović, Mrvica (CRO)
12 February 2020; 19:00	Ekberg 8	(15–15)	Borozan, Nilsson 5	Sparkassen-Arena, Kiel; Attendance: 10,285; Referees: Jurinović, Mrvica (CRO)
12 February 2020; 19:00	1× (yellow card) 1× (suspension)	Report	3× (yellow card) 2× (suspension)	Sparkassen-Arena, Kiel; Attendance: 10,285; Referees: Jurinović, Mrvica (CRO)

15 February 2020; 15:00	PGE Vive Kielce (Poland)	30–25	(Portugal) FC Porto Sofarma	Hala Legionów, Kielce; Attendance: 4,100; Referees: Covalciuc, Covalciuc (MDA)
15 February 2020; 15:00	Dujshebaev 7	(12–12)	Magalhães, Martins 5	Hala Legionów, Kielce; Attendance: 4,100; Referees: Covalciuc, Covalciuc (MDA)
15 February 2020; 15:00	2× (yellow card) 1× (suspension)	Report	3× (yellow card) 4× (suspension)	Hala Legionów, Kielce; Attendance: 4,100; Referees: Covalciuc, Covalciuc (MDA)

15 February 2020; 17:15	Montpellier Handball (France)	30–26	(Belarus) HC Meshkov Brest	Palais des sports René-Bougnol, Montpellier; Attendance: 3,000; Referees: Brkic, Jusufhodzic (AUT)
15 February 2020; 17:15	Descat 11	(16–14)	Baranau 5	Palais des sports René-Bougnol, Montpellier; Attendance: 3,000; Referees: Brkic, Jusufhodzic (AUT)
15 February 2020; 17:15	2× (yellow card) 3× (suspension)	Report	3× (yellow card) 3× (suspension)	Palais des sports René-Bougnol, Montpellier; Attendance: 3,000; Referees: Brkic, Jusufhodzic (AUT)

15 February 2020; 17:30	Vardar (North Macedonia)	38–28	(Ukraine) HC Motor Zaporizhzhia	Jane Sandanski Arena, Skopje; Attendance: 4,200; Referees: Mažeika, Gatelis (LTU)
15 February 2020; 17:30	Skube 8	(16–11)	Pukhouski 7	Jane Sandanski Arena, Skopje; Attendance: 4,200; Referees: Mažeika, Gatelis (LTU)
15 February 2020; 17:30	2× (yellow card) 2× (suspension) 1× (red card)	Report	3× (yellow card) 4× (suspension)	Jane Sandanski Arena, Skopje; Attendance: 4,200; Referees: Mažeika, Gatelis (LTU)

20 February 2020; 18:00	HC Motor Zaporizhzhia (Ukraine)	26–33	(Poland) PGE Vive Kielce	Sport Palace Yunost, Zaporizhzhia; Attendance: 1,600; Referees: Sondors, Līcis (LAT)
20 February 2020; 18:00	Kozakevych 5	(14–19)	Karalek 8	Sport Palace Yunost, Zaporizhzhia; Attendance: 1,600; Referees: Sondors, Līcis (LAT)
20 February 2020; 18:00	2× (yellow card) 4× (suspension)	Report	1× (yellow card) 5× (suspension)	Sport Palace Yunost, Zaporizhzhia; Attendance: 1,600; Referees: Sondors, Līcis (LAT)

22 February 2020; 16:00	FC Porto Sofarma (Portugal)	30–22	(North Macedonia) Vardar	Dragão Caixa, Porto; Attendance: 1,711; Referees: Horváth, Marton (HUN)
22 February 2020; 16:00	three players 5	(11–10)	Shishkarev 7	Dragão Caixa, Porto; Attendance: 1,711; Referees: Horváth, Marton (HUN)
22 February 2020; 16:00	3× (yellow card) 1× (suspension)	Report	2× (yellow card) 3× (suspension)	Dragão Caixa, Porto; Attendance: 1,711; Referees: Horváth, Marton (HUN)

22 February 2020; 17:30	HC Meshkov Brest (Belarus)	33–30	(Germany) THW Kiel	Sportshall Victoria, Brest; Attendance: 3,300; Referees: Gasmi, Gasmi (FRA)
22 February 2020; 17:30	Vailupau 11	(16–13)	Nilsson 8	Sportshall Victoria, Brest; Attendance: 3,300; Referees: Gasmi, Gasmi (FRA)
22 February 2020; 17:30	1× (yellow card) 1× (suspension)	Report	1× (yellow card) 1× (suspension)	Sportshall Victoria, Brest; Attendance: 3,300; Referees: Gasmi, Gasmi (FRA)

23 February 2020; 17:00	Telekom Veszprém (Hungary)	24–23	(France) Montpellier Handball	Veszprém Aréna, Veszprém; Attendance: 5,019; Referees: Kurtagic, Wetterwik (SWE)
23 February 2020; 17:00	Gajić 7	(16–14)	Descat 6	Veszprém Aréna, Veszprém; Attendance: 5,019; Referees: Kurtagic, Wetterwik (SWE)
23 February 2020; 17:00	1× (yellow card) 3× (suspension)	Report	2× (yellow card) 1× (suspension)	Veszprém Aréna, Veszprém; Attendance: 5,019; Referees: Kurtagic, Wetterwik (SWE)

29 February 2020; 17:30	Vardar (North Macedonia)	27–31	(France) Montpellier Handball	Jane Sandanski Arena, Skopje; Attendance: 3,500; Referees: Baďura, Ondogrecula (SVK)
29 February 2020; 17:30	Stoilov 7	(13–14)	Descat 8	Jane Sandanski Arena, Skopje; Attendance: 3,500; Referees: Baďura, Ondogrecula (SVK)
29 February 2020; 17:30	2× (yellow card) 2× (suspension)	Report	2× (yellow card) 2× (suspension)	Jane Sandanski Arena, Skopje; Attendance: 3,500; Referees: Baďura, Ondogrecula (SVK)

29 February 2020; 17:30	HC Motor Zaporizhzhia (Ukraine)	22–32	(Hungary) Telekom Veszprém	Sport Palace Yunost, Zaporizhzhia; Attendance: 1,200; Referees: Horáček, Novotný (CZE)
29 February 2020; 17:30	Denysov 5	(8–17)	Gajić 5	Sport Palace Yunost, Zaporizhzhia; Attendance: 1,200; Referees: Horáček, Novotný (CZE)
29 February 2020; 17:30	2× (yellow card) 2× (suspension)	Report	2× (yellow card) 2× (suspension)	Sport Palace Yunost, Zaporizhzhia; Attendance: 1,200; Referees: Horáček, Novotný (CZE)

29 February 2020; 17:30	HC Meshkov Brest (Belarus)	32–35	(Portugal) FC Porto Sofarma	Sportshall Victoria, Brest; Attendance: 3,100; Referees: Nikolić, Stojković (SRB)
29 February 2020; 17:30	Malus 10	(13–17)	Alves 5	Sportshall Victoria, Brest; Attendance: 3,100; Referees: Nikolić, Stojković (SRB)
29 February 2020; 17:30	3× (yellow card)	Report	2× (yellow card) 6× (suspension)	Sportshall Victoria, Brest; Attendance: 3,100; Referees: Nikolić, Stojković (SRB)

29 February 2020; 18:00	PGE Vive Kielce (Poland)	32–30	(Germany) THW Kiel	Hala Legionów, Kielce; Attendance: 4,200; Referees: Nikolov, Nachevski (MKD)
29 February 2020; 18:00	A. Dujshebaev 6	(16–18)	Ekberg 8	Hala Legionów, Kielce; Attendance: 4,200; Referees: Nikolov, Nachevski (MKD)
29 February 2020; 18:00	2× (yellow card) 5× (suspension)	Report	1× (yellow card) 5× (suspension)	Hala Legionów, Kielce; Attendance: 4,200; Referees: Nikolov, Nachevski (MKD)

=== Group C ===
Pos	Team	Pld	W	D	L	GF	GA	GD	Pts	Qualification
1	(Spain) Bidasoa Irun	10	6	3	1	297	246	+51	15	Playoffs
2	(Portugal) Sporting CP	10	6	2	2	309	266	+43	14	Playoffs
3	(Sweden) IK Sävehof	10	6	0	4	268	278	−10	12	
4	(Slovakia) Tatran Prešov	10	3	1	6	260	279	−19	7	
5	(Finland) Riihimäki Cocks	10	3	0	7	239	290	−51	6 (Note: Riihimäki Cocks 53–52 Eurofarm Rabotnik)	
6	(North Macedonia) Eurofarm Rabotnik	10	3	0	7	265	279	−14	6	

Source: EHF
Rules for classification: Tiebreakers
Notes:

11 September 2019; 18:00	Riihimäki Cocks (Finland)	25–30	(Sweden) IK Sävehof	Cocks Areena, Riihimäki; Attendance: 1,217; Referees: Covalciuc, Covalciuc (MDA)
11 September 2019; 18:00	Lukyanchuk, Semenov 6	(13–18)	Bogojevic 8	Cocks Areena, Riihimäki; Attendance: 1,217; Referees: Covalciuc, Covalciuc (MDA)
11 September 2019; 18:00	1× (yellow card) 5× (suspension)	Report	1× (yellow card) 5× (suspension)	Cocks Areena, Riihimäki; Attendance: 1,217; Referees: Covalciuc, Covalciuc (MDA)

14 September 2019; 18:00	Tatran Prešov (Slovakia)	23–25	(Spain) Bidasoa Irun	Tatran Handball Arena, Prešov; Attendance: 2,425; Referees: Andorka, Hucker (HUN)
14 September 2019; 18:00	Grzentič 5	(13–13)	Odriozola 6	Tatran Handball Arena, Prešov; Attendance: 2,425; Referees: Andorka, Hucker (HUN)
14 September 2019; 18:00	1× (yellow card) 3× (suspension)	Report	1× (suspension)	Tatran Handball Arena, Prešov; Attendance: 2,425; Referees: Andorka, Hucker (HUN)

15 September 2019; 17:00	Eurofarm Rabotnik (North Macedonia)	29–30	(Portugal) Sporting CP	Sports Hall Boro Čurlevski, Bitola; Attendance: 2,100; Referees: Erdoğan, Özdeniz (TUR)
15 September 2019; 17:00	Jotić, Ostroushko 5	(16–15)	Ghionea 10	Sports Hall Boro Čurlevski, Bitola; Attendance: 2,100; Referees: Erdoğan, Özdeniz (TUR)
15 September 2019; 17:00	1× (yellow card) 2× (suspension)	Report	2× (suspension)	Sports Hall Boro Čurlevski, Bitola; Attendance: 2,100; Referees: Erdoğan, Özdeniz (TUR)

18 September 2019; 19:00	IK Sävehof (Sweden)	25–24	(North Macedonia) Eurofarm Rabotnik	Partille Arena, Partille; Attendance: 850; Referees: Bolic, Hurich (AUT)
18 September 2019; 19:00	Karlsson, Sunajko 5	(10–15)	Jotić 8	Partille Arena, Partille; Attendance: 850; Referees: Bolic, Hurich (AUT)
18 September 2019; 19:00	1× (yellow card) 3× (suspension) 1× (red card)	Report	1× (yellow card) 5× (suspension)	Partille Arena, Partille; Attendance: 850; Referees: Bolic, Hurich (AUT)

21 September 2019; 16:00	Bidasoa Irun (Spain)	34–19	(Finland) Riihimäki Cocks	Pabellón Polideportivo Artaleku, Irun; Attendance: 1,793; Referees: Opava, Válek (CZE)
21 September 2019; 16:00	Zabala 5	(17–11)	Rönnberg 5	Pabellón Polideportivo Artaleku, Irun; Attendance: 1,793; Referees: Opava, Válek (CZE)
21 September 2019; 16:00	2× (yellow card) 2× (suspension)	Report	2× (yellow card) 3× (suspension)	Pabellón Polideportivo Artaleku, Irun; Attendance: 1,793; Referees: Opava, Válek (CZE)

21 September 2019; 19:30	Sporting CP (Portugal)	32–24	(Slovakia) Tatran Prešov	Pavilhão João Rocha, Lisbon; Attendance: 1,868; Referees: Gousko, Repkin (BLR)
21 September 2019; 19:30	Frankis 5	(17–14)	Urban 5	Pavilhão João Rocha, Lisbon; Attendance: 1,868; Referees: Gousko, Repkin (BLR)
21 September 2019; 19:30	2× (yellow card) 1× (suspension)	Report	2× (yellow card) 3× (suspension)	Pavilhão João Rocha, Lisbon; Attendance: 1,868; Referees: Gousko, Repkin (BLR)

25 September 2019; 18:00	Riihimäki Cocks (Finland)	29–27	(Slovakia) Tatran Prešov	Cocks Areena, Riihimäki; Attendance: 787; Referees: Stark, Ştefan (ROU)
25 September 2019; 18:00	Rönnberg, Tamminen 7	(15–12)	Cabezón 9	Cocks Areena, Riihimäki; Attendance: 787; Referees: Stark, Ştefan (ROU)
25 September 2019; 18:00	3× (yellow card) 6× (suspension) 1× (red card)	Report	2× (yellow card) 3× (suspension)	Cocks Areena, Riihimäki; Attendance: 787; Referees: Stark, Ştefan (ROU)

26 September 2019; 19:00	IK Sävehof (Sweden)	29–24	(Portugal) Sporting CP	Partille Arena, Partille; Attendance: 800; Referees: Manea, Iliescu (ROU)
26 September 2019; 19:00	Edvardsson 6	(13–10)	Araújo, Frankis 4	Partille Arena, Partille; Attendance: 800; Referees: Manea, Iliescu (ROU)
26 September 2019; 19:00	3× (yellow card) 3× (suspension)	Report	2× (yellow card) 3× (suspension)	Partille Arena, Partille; Attendance: 800; Referees: Manea, Iliescu (ROU)

29 September 2019; 12:10	Bidasoa Irun (Spain)	26–25	(North Macedonia) Eurofarm Rabotnik	Pabellón Polideportivo Artaleku, Irun; Attendance: 1,698; Referees: Cindrić, Gonzurek (CRO)
29 September 2019; 12:10	Novella 8	(11–14)	Ostroushko 9	Pabellón Polideportivo Artaleku, Irun; Attendance: 1,698; Referees: Cindrić, Gonzurek (CRO)
29 September 2019; 12:10	2× (yellow card) 1× (suspension)	Report	2× (yellow card) 3× (suspension) 1× (red card)	Pabellón Polideportivo Artaleku, Irun; Attendance: 1,698; Referees: Cindrić, Gonzurek (CRO)

12 October 2019; 18:30	Tatran Prešov (Slovakia)	23–28	(Sweden) IK Sävehof	Tatran Handball Arena, Prešov; Referees: Baumgart, Wild (GER)
12 October 2019; 18:30	Cabezón 8	(10–16)	Salihi 11	Tatran Handball Arena, Prešov; Referees: Baumgart, Wild (GER)
12 October 2019; 18:30	3× (yellow card) 3× (suspension)	Report	3× (yellow card) 3× (suspension)	Tatran Handball Arena, Prešov; Referees: Baumgart, Wild (GER)

12 October 2019; 19:30	Sporting CP (Portugal)	30–30	(Spain) Bidasoa Irun	Pavilhão João Rocha, Lisbon; Attendance: 1,653; Referees: Gasmi, Gasmi (FRA)
12 October 2019; 19:30	Ghionea 7	(16–17)	Salinas 8	Pavilhão João Rocha, Lisbon; Attendance: 1,653; Referees: Gasmi, Gasmi (FRA)
12 October 2019; 19:30	1× (yellow card) 3× (suspension)	Report	2× (yellow card) 1× (suspension)	Pavilhão João Rocha, Lisbon; Attendance: 1,653; Referees: Gasmi, Gasmi (FRA)

13 October 2019; 17:00	Eurofarm Rabotnik (North Macedonia)	31–30	(Finland) Riihimäki Cocks	Sports Hall Boro Čurlevski, Bitola; Attendance: 2,500; Referees: Andorka, Hucker (HUN)
13 October 2019; 17:00	Ostroushko 8	(17–13)	Tamminen 6	Sports Hall Boro Čurlevski, Bitola; Attendance: 2,500; Referees: Andorka, Hucker (HUN)
13 October 2019; 17:00	2× (yellow card) 4× (suspension)	Report	2× (yellow card) 4× (suspension)	Sports Hall Boro Čurlevski, Bitola; Attendance: 2,500; Referees: Andorka, Hucker (HUN)

20 October 2019; 12:10	Bidasoa Irun (Spain)	39–23	(Sweden) IK Sävehof	Pabellón Polideportivo Artaleku, Irun; Attendance: 1,910; Referees: Vešović, Mitrović (MNE)
20 October 2019; 12:10	Azkue 8	(21–12)	Blanche 5	Pabellón Polideportivo Artaleku, Irun; Attendance: 1,910; Referees: Vešović, Mitrović (MNE)
20 October 2019; 12:10	3× (yellow card) 2× (suspension)	Report	2× (yellow card) 4× (suspension)	Pabellón Polideportivo Artaleku, Irun; Attendance: 1,910; Referees: Vešović, Mitrović (MNE)

20 October 2019; 17:00	Eurofarm Rabotnik (North Macedonia)	23–24	(Slovakia) Tatran Prešov	Sports Hall Boro Čurlevski, Bitola; Attendance: 3,000; Referees: Leszczyński, Piechota (POL)
20 October 2019; 17:00	Ostroushko 8	(14–13)	Rábek 7	Sports Hall Boro Čurlevski, Bitola; Attendance: 3,000; Referees: Leszczyński, Piechota (POL)
20 October 2019; 17:00	2× (yellow card) 4× (suspension)	Report	3× (yellow card) 4× (suspension)	Sports Hall Boro Čurlevski, Bitola; Attendance: 3,000; Referees: Leszczyński, Piechota (POL)

20 October 2019; 17:00	Riihimäki Cocks (Finland)	25–23	(Portugal) Sporting CP	Cocks Areena, Riihimäki; Attendance: 787; Referees: Boričič, Marković (SRB)
20 October 2019; 17:00	Tamminen 6	(12–11)	Ghionea 5	Cocks Areena, Riihimäki; Attendance: 787; Referees: Boričič, Marković (SRB)
20 October 2019; 17:00	2× (yellow card) 5× (suspension) 1× (red card)	Report	1× (yellow card) 3× (suspension)	Cocks Areena, Riihimäki; Attendance: 787; Referees: Boričič, Marković (SRB)

2 November 2019; 16:00	IK Sävehof (Sweden)	24–33	(Spain) Bidasoa Irun	Partille Arena, Partille; Attendance: 1,284; Referees: Konjičanin, Konjičanin (BIH)
2 November 2019; 16:00	Edvardsson 5	(9–20)	Salinas 5	Partille Arena, Partille; Attendance: 1,284; Referees: Konjičanin, Konjičanin (BIH)
2 November 2019; 16:00	5× (suspension)	Report	2× (yellow card) 3× (suspension) 1× (red card)	Partille Arena, Partille; Attendance: 1,284; Referees: Konjičanin, Konjičanin (BIH)

2 November 2019; 17:30	Sporting CP (Portugal)	38–29	(Finland) Riihimäki Cocks	Pavilhão João Rocha, Lisbon; Attendance: 1,205; Referees: Bolic, Hurich (AUT)
2 November 2019; 17:30	Frankis 11	(23–15)	Tamminen 11	Pavilhão João Rocha, Lisbon; Attendance: 1,205; Referees: Bolic, Hurich (AUT)
2 November 2019; 17:30	1× (yellow card) 4× (suspension)	Report	1× (yellow card) 5× (suspension)	Pavilhão João Rocha, Lisbon; Attendance: 1,205; Referees: Bolic, Hurich (AUT)

2 November 2019; 18:00	Tatran Prešov (Slovakia)	31–29	(North Macedonia) Eurofarm Rabotnik	Tatran Handball Arena, Prešov; Attendance: 1,124; Referees: Šniūrevičius, Grigalionis (LTU)
2 November 2019; 18:00	Rábek 10	(15–14)	Ostroushko 8	Tatran Handball Arena, Prešov; Attendance: 1,124; Referees: Šniūrevičius, Grigalionis (LTU)
2 November 2019; 18:00	3× (suspension)	Report	2× (yellow card) 5× (suspension)	Tatran Handball Arena, Prešov; Attendance: 1,124; Referees: Šniūrevičius, Grigalionis (LTU)

9 November 2019; 16:00	IK Sävehof (Sweden)	28–22	(Finland) Riihimäki Cocks	Partille Arena, Partille; Attendance: 1,592; Referees: Cindrić, Gonzurek (CRO)
9 November 2019; 16:00	Brännberger 6	(12–8)	four players 5	Partille Arena, Partille; Attendance: 1,592; Referees: Cindrić, Gonzurek (CRO)
9 November 2019; 16:00	3× (yellow card) 2× (suspension)	Report	2× (yellow card) 5× (suspension)	Partille Arena, Partille; Attendance: 1,592; Referees: Cindrić, Gonzurek (CRO)

9 November 2019; 16:00	Bidasoa Irun (Spain)	27–27	(Slovakia) Tatran Prešov	Pabellón Polideportivo Artaleku, Irun; Attendance: 1,910; Referees: Simone, Monitillo (ITA)
9 November 2019; 16:00	Renaud-David 6	(12–15)	Rábek, Urban 6	Pabellón Polideportivo Artaleku, Irun; Attendance: 1,910; Referees: Simone, Monitillo (ITA)
9 November 2019; 16:00	1× (yellow card) 2× (suspension)	Report	1× (yellow card) 5× (suspension)	Pabellón Polideportivo Artaleku, Irun; Attendance: 1,910; Referees: Simone, Monitillo (ITA)

9 November 2019; 19:30	Sporting CP (Portugal)	36–26	(North Macedonia) Eurofarm Rabotnik	Pavilhão João Rocha, Lisbon; Attendance: 1,341; Referees: Baumgart, Wild (GER)
9 November 2019; 19:30	Rocha 7	(17–11)	Jotić 8	Pavilhão João Rocha, Lisbon; Attendance: 1,341; Referees: Baumgart, Wild (GER)
9 November 2019; 19:30	2× (yellow card) 2× (suspension)	Report	3× (yellow card) 4× (suspension)	Pavilhão João Rocha, Lisbon; Attendance: 1,341; Referees: Baumgart, Wild (GER)

13 November 2019; 18:00	Tatran Prešov (Slovakia)	22–37	(Portugal) Sporting CP	Tatran Handball Arena, Prešov; Attendance: 1,400; Referees: Vešović, Mitrović (MNE)
13 November 2019; 18:00	Urban 6	(10–16)	Ghionea 8	Tatran Handball Arena, Prešov; Attendance: 1,400; Referees: Vešović, Mitrović (MNE)
13 November 2019; 18:00	2× (yellow card) 5× (suspension)	Report	1× (yellow card) 4× (suspension)	Tatran Handball Arena, Prešov; Attendance: 1,400; Referees: Vešović, Mitrović (MNE)

17 November 2019; 17:00	Eurofarm Rabotnik (North Macedonia)	32–31	(Sweden) IK Sävehof	Sports Hall Boro Čurlevski, Bitola; Attendance: 2,000; Referees: Nabokau, Kulik (BLR)
17 November 2019; 17:00	three players 6	(18–12)	Bogojevic 9	Sports Hall Boro Čurlevski, Bitola; Attendance: 2,000; Referees: Nabokau, Kulik (BLR)
17 November 2019; 17:00	2× (yellow card) 2× (suspension)	Report	2× (yellow card) 4× (suspension)	Sports Hall Boro Čurlevski, Bitola; Attendance: 2,000; Referees: Nabokau, Kulik (BLR)

17 November 2019; 17:00	Riihimäki Cocks (Finland)	18–28	(Spain) Bidasoa Irun	Cocks Areena, Riihimäki; Attendance: 757; Referees: Manea, Iliescu (ROU)
17 November 2019; 17:00	Tamminen 5	(9–12)	Odriozola, Renaud-David 7	Cocks Areena, Riihimäki; Attendance: 757; Referees: Manea, Iliescu (ROU)
17 November 2019; 17:00	2× (yellow card) 5× (suspension)	Report	1× (suspension)	Cocks Areena, Riihimäki; Attendance: 757; Referees: Manea, Iliescu (ROU)

20 November 2019; 18:00	Riihimäki Cocks (Finland)	23–21	(North Macedonia) Eurofarm Rabotnik	Cocks Areena, Riihimäki; Attendance: 575; Referees: Backović, Palačković (SLO)
20 November 2019; 18:00	Tamminen 6	(13–13)	Jotić 5	Cocks Areena, Riihimäki; Attendance: 575; Referees: Backović, Palačković (SLO)
20 November 2019; 18:00	2× (yellow card) 5× (suspension)	Report	3× (yellow card) 3× (suspension)	Cocks Areena, Riihimäki; Attendance: 575; Referees: Backović, Palačković (SLO)

23 November 2019; 16:00	IK Sävehof (Sweden)	30–29	(Slovakia) Tatran Prešov	Partille Arena, Partille; Attendance: 1,012; Referees: Vitaku, Vitaku (KOS)
23 November 2019; 16:00	Bogojevic 12	(16–16)	Gatine 7	Partille Arena, Partille; Attendance: 1,012; Referees: Vitaku, Vitaku (KOS)
23 November 2019; 16:00	2× (yellow card) 3× (suspension)	Report	2× (yellow card) 2× (suspension) 2× (red card)	Partille Arena, Partille; Attendance: 1,012; Referees: Vitaku, Vitaku (KOS)

23 November 2019; 16:00	Bidasoa Irun (Spain)	32–32	(Portugal) Sporting CP	Pabellón Polideportivo Artaleku, Irun; Attendance: 1,925; Referees: Madsen, Mortensen (DEN)
23 November 2019; 16:00	Odriozola 8	(16–16)	Frankis 9	Pabellón Polideportivo Artaleku, Irun; Attendance: 1,925; Referees: Madsen, Mortensen (DEN)
23 November 2019; 16:00	2× (suspension)	Report	5× (suspension)	Pabellón Polideportivo Artaleku, Irun; Attendance: 1,925; Referees: Madsen, Mortensen (DEN)

30 November 2019; 17:30	Eurofarm Rabotnik (North Macedonia)	25–23	(Spain) Bidasoa Irun	Sports Hall Boro Čurlevski, Bitola; Attendance: 1,950; Referees: Brkic, Jusufhodzic (AUT)
30 November 2019; 17:30	Ostroushko 8	(14–15)	Seri 9	Sports Hall Boro Čurlevski, Bitola; Attendance: 1,950; Referees: Brkic, Jusufhodzic (AUT)
30 November 2019; 17:30	2× (yellow card) 3× (suspension)	Report	2× (yellow card) 2× (suspension)	Sports Hall Boro Čurlevski, Bitola; Attendance: 1,950; Referees: Brkic, Jusufhodzic (AUT)

30 November 2019; 18:00	Sporting CP (Portugal)	27–20	(Sweden) IK Sävehof	Pavilhão João Rocha, Lisbon; Attendance: 2,564; Referees: Zotin, Volodkov (RUS)
30 November 2019; 18:00	Frade 6	(14–9)	Karlsson 5	Pavilhão João Rocha, Lisbon; Attendance: 2,564; Referees: Zotin, Volodkov (RUS)
30 November 2019; 18:00	1× (yellow card) 3× (suspension)	Report	3× (yellow card) 2× (suspension)	Pavilhão João Rocha, Lisbon; Attendance: 2,564; Referees: Zotin, Volodkov (RUS)

30 November 2019; 18:00	Tatran Prešov (Slovakia)	30–19	(Finland) Riihimäki Cocks	Tatran Handball Arena, Prešov; Attendance: 1,026; Referees: Jerlecki, Labun (POL)
30 November 2019; 18:00	Muñoz 8	(15–11)	Tamminen 8	Tatran Handball Arena, Prešov; Attendance: 1,026; Referees: Jerlecki, Labun (POL)
30 November 2019; 18:00	1× (yellow card) 5× (suspension)	Report	3× (yellow card) 5× (suspension)	Tatran Handball Arena, Prešov; Attendance: 1,026; Referees: Jerlecki, Labun (POL)

=== Group D ===
Pos	Team	Pld	W	D	L	GF	GA	GD	Pts	Qualification
1	(Romania) CS Dinamo București	10	7	3	0	298	256	+42	17	Playoffs
2	(Poland) Orlen Wisła Płock	10	5	1	4	267	260	+7	11	Playoffs
3	(Denmark) GOG Håndbold	10	4	1	5	310	319	−9	9 (Note: GOG Håndbold 70–61 IFK Kristianstad)	
4	(Sweden) IFK Kristianstad	10	3	3	4	283	298	−15	9	
5	(Russia) Chekhovskiye Medvedi	10	4	0	6	280	308	−28	8	
6	(Switzerland) Kadetten Schaffhausen	10	2	2	6	280	277	+3	6	

Source: EHF
Rules for classification: Tiebreakers
Notes:

12 September 2019; 20:15	Kadetten Schaffhausen (Switzerland)	28–28	(Romania) CS Dinamo București	BBC-Arena, Schaffhausen; Attendance: 873; Referees: Baumgart, Wild (GER)
12 September 2019; 20:15	Maros, Šešum 6	(14–15)	Bannour, Kuduz 5	BBC-Arena, Schaffhausen; Attendance: 873; Referees: Baumgart, Wild (GER)
12 September 2019; 20:15	3× (yellow card) 4× (suspension)	Report	2× (yellow card) 4× (suspension) 1× (red card)	BBC-Arena, Schaffhausen; Attendance: 873; Referees: Baumgart, Wild (GER)

14 September 2019; 15:00	Chekhovskiye Medvedi (Russia)	25–23	(Poland) Orlen Wisła Płock	Olimpiysky Sport Palace, Chekhov; Attendance: 1,800; Referees: Baďura, Ondogrecula (SVK)
14 September 2019; 15:00	Kiselev, Santalov 6	(9–7)	Matulić 5	Olimpiysky Sport Palace, Chekhov; Attendance: 1,800; Referees: Baďura, Ondogrecula (SVK)
14 September 2019; 15:00	1× (yellow card) 2× (suspension)	Report	3× (yellow card) 5× (suspension)	Olimpiysky Sport Palace, Chekhov; Attendance: 1,800; Referees: Baďura, Ondogrecula (SVK)

15 September 2019; 17:00	IFK Kristianstad (Sweden)	24–33	(Denmark) GOG Håndbold	Kristianstad Arena, Kristianstad; Attendance: 3,382; Referees: Jørum, Kleven (NOR)
15 September 2019; 17:00	Einarsson 6	(14–17)	Jakobsen 8	Kristianstad Arena, Kristianstad; Attendance: 3,382; Referees: Jørum, Kleven (NOR)
15 September 2019; 17:00	1× (yellow card) 2× (suspension)	Report	1× (yellow card) 2× (suspension)	Kristianstad Arena, Kristianstad; Attendance: 3,382; Referees: Jørum, Kleven (NOR)

18 September 2019; 17:00	CS Dinamo București (Romania)	28–25	(Sweden) IFK Kristianstad	Dinamo Polyvalent Hall, Bucharest; Attendance: 2,000; Referees: Álvarez, Bustamante (ESP)
18 September 2019; 17:00	Asoltanei 6	(13–10)	Halén 5	Dinamo Polyvalent Hall, Bucharest; Attendance: 2,000; Referees: Álvarez, Bustamante (ESP)
18 September 2019; 17:00	5× (suspension)	Report	2× (yellow card) 5× (suspension)	Dinamo Polyvalent Hall, Bucharest; Attendance: 2,000; Referees: Álvarez, Bustamante (ESP)

21 September 2019; 15:00	Orlen Wisła Płock (Poland)	27–23	(Switzerland) Kadetten Schaffhausen	Orlen Arena, Płock; Attendance: 2,540; Referees: Boričič, Marković (SRB)
21 September 2019; 15:00	Stenmalm 5	(16–12)	Frimmel 4	Orlen Arena, Płock; Attendance: 2,540; Referees: Boričič, Marković (SRB)
21 September 2019; 15:00	3× (yellow card) 5× (suspension)	Report	2× (yellow card) 3× (suspension)	Orlen Arena, Płock; Attendance: 2,540; Referees: Boričič, Marković (SRB)

22 September 2019; 15:10	GOG Håndbold (Denmark)	38–31	(Russia) Chekhovskiye Medvedi	Jyske Bank Arena, Odense; Attendance: 3,245; Referees: Konjičanin, Konjičanin (BIH)
22 September 2019; 15:10	Møller, Tilsted 6	(20–15)	Kosorotov 5	Jyske Bank Arena, Odense; Attendance: 3,245; Referees: Konjičanin, Konjičanin (BIH)
22 September 2019; 15:10	2× (yellow card) 7× (suspension)	Report	2× (yellow card) 5× (suspension)	Jyske Bank Arena, Odense; Attendance: 3,245; Referees: Konjičanin, Konjičanin (BIH)

25 September 2019; 18:00	CS Dinamo București (Romania)	35–28	(Denmark) GOG Håndbold	Dinamo Polyvalent Hall, Bucharest; Attendance: 2,200; Referees: Sondors, Līcis (LAT)
25 September 2019; 18:00	Bannour 11	(17–12)	Jakobsen 8	Dinamo Polyvalent Hall, Bucharest; Attendance: 2,200; Referees: Sondors, Līcis (LAT)
25 September 2019; 18:00	2× (yellow card) 5× (suspension)	Report	2× (yellow card) 2× (suspension)	Dinamo Polyvalent Hall, Bucharest; Attendance: 2,200; Referees: Sondors, Līcis (LAT)

29 September 2019; 17:30	Orlen Wisła Płock (Poland)	36–29	(Sweden) IFK Kristianstad	Orlen Arena, Płock; Attendance: 2,500; Referees: Mitrevski, Todorovski (MKD)
29 September 2019; 17:30	Igropulo 6	(19–13)	Guðmundsson 12	Orlen Arena, Płock; Attendance: 2,500; Referees: Mitrevski, Todorovski (MKD)
29 September 2019; 17:30	2× (yellow card) 5× (suspension)	Report	2× (yellow card) 3× (suspension)	Orlen Arena, Płock; Attendance: 2,500; Referees: Mitrevski, Todorovski (MKD)

29 September 2019; 19:00	Kadetten Schaffhausen (Switzerland)	32–23	(Russia) Chekhovskiye Medvedi	BBC-Arena, Schaffhausen; Attendance: 839; Referees: Vešović, Mitrović (MNE)
29 September 2019; 19:00	Gerbl, Šešum 5	(15–10)	A. Kotov 4	BBC-Arena, Schaffhausen; Attendance: 839; Referees: Vešović, Mitrović (MNE)
29 September 2019; 19:00	2× (yellow card) 2× (suspension)	Report	2× (yellow card) 6× (suspension) 1× (red card)	BBC-Arena, Schaffhausen; Attendance: 839; Referees: Vešović, Mitrović (MNE)

10 October 2019; 19:00	IFK Kristianstad (Sweden)	24–24	(Switzerland) Kadetten Schaffhausen	Kristianstad Arena, Kristianstad; Attendance: 3,042; Referees: Brunovský, Čanda (SVK)
10 October 2019; 19:00	Guðmundsson 9	(11–15)	Császár 7	Kristianstad Arena, Kristianstad; Attendance: 3,042; Referees: Brunovský, Čanda (SVK)
10 October 2019; 19:00	2× (yellow card) 1× (suspension)	Report	2× (yellow card) 3× (suspension)	Kristianstad Arena, Kristianstad; Attendance: 3,042; Referees: Brunovský, Čanda (SVK)

12 October 2019; 15:00	Chekhovskiye Medvedi (Russia)	20–30	(Romania) CS Dinamo București	Olimpiysky Sport Palace, Chekhov; Attendance: 1,020; Referees: Erdoğan, Özdeniz (TUR)
12 October 2019; 15:00	three players 4	(10–16)	Kuduz 6	Olimpiysky Sport Palace, Chekhov; Attendance: 1,020; Referees: Erdoğan, Özdeniz (TUR)
12 October 2019; 15:00	2× (yellow card) 3× (suspension) 1× (red card)	Report	1× (yellow card) 7× (suspension)	Olimpiysky Sport Palace, Chekhov; Attendance: 1,020; Referees: Erdoğan, Özdeniz (TUR)

13 October 2019; 16:50	GOG Håndbold (Denmark)	28–27	(Poland) Orlen Wisła Płock	Jyske Bank Arena, Odense; Attendance: 3,642; Referees: Covalciuc, Covalciuc (MDA)
13 October 2019; 16:50	Jakobsen 7	(16–14)	Igropulo, Mihić 5	Jyske Bank Arena, Odense; Attendance: 3,642; Referees: Covalciuc, Covalciuc (MDA)
13 October 2019; 16:50	2× (yellow card) 4× (suspension)	Report	2× (yellow card) 6× (suspension)	Jyske Bank Arena, Odense; Attendance: 3,642; Referees: Covalciuc, Covalciuc (MDA)

19 October 2019; 18:00	IFK Kristianstad (Sweden)	36–28	(Russia) Chekhovskiye Medvedi	Kristianstad Arena, Kristianstad; Attendance: 3,116; Referees: Caçador, Nicolau (POR)
19 October 2019; 18:00	Nyfjäll 8	(19–13)	A.Kotov 5	Kristianstad Arena, Kristianstad; Attendance: 3,116; Referees: Caçador, Nicolau (POR)
19 October 2019; 18:00	2× (yellow card) 5× (suspension)	Report	1× (yellow card) 2× (suspension)	Kristianstad Arena, Kristianstad; Attendance: 3,116; Referees: Caçador, Nicolau (POR)

20 October 2019; 15:10	GOG Håndbold (Denmark)	35–30	(Switzerland) Kadetten Schaffhausen	Jyske Bank Arena, Odense; Attendance: 3,845; Referees: Álvarez, Bustamante (ESP)
20 October 2019; 15:10	Jakobsen 7	(18–15)	Schelker 7	Jyske Bank Arena, Odense; Attendance: 3,845; Referees: Álvarez, Bustamante (ESP)
20 October 2019; 15:10	2× (yellow card) 4× (suspension)	Report	1× (yellow card) 6× (suspension)	Jyske Bank Arena, Odense; Attendance: 3,845; Referees: Álvarez, Bustamante (ESP)

20 October 2019; 16:00	Orlen Wisła Płock (Poland)	26–26	(Romania) CS Dinamo București	Orlen Arena, Płock; Attendance: 3,500; Referees: Horváth, Marton (HUN)
20 October 2019; 16:00	Mihić, Mindegía 7	(13–12)	Negru 5	Orlen Arena, Płock; Attendance: 3,500; Referees: Horváth, Marton (HUN)
20 October 2019; 16:00	2× (yellow card) 5× (suspension)	Report	3× (yellow card) 6× (suspension)	Orlen Arena, Płock; Attendance: 3,500; Referees: Horváth, Marton (HUN)

30 October 2019; 18:00	CS Dinamo București (Romania)	29–20	(Poland) Orlen Wisła Płock	Dinamo Polyvalent Hall, Bucharest; Attendance: 2,100; Referees: Pandžić, Mošorinski (SRB)
30 October 2019; 18:00	Alouini, Kuduz 6	(13–10)	Mlakar 5	Dinamo Polyvalent Hall, Bucharest; Attendance: 2,100; Referees: Pandžić, Mošorinski (SRB)
30 October 2019; 18:00	1× (yellow card) 3× (suspension)	Report	3× (yellow card) 8× (suspension)	Dinamo Polyvalent Hall, Bucharest; Attendance: 2,100; Referees: Pandžić, Mošorinski (SRB)

31 October 2019; 20:15	Kadetten Schaffhausen (Switzerland)	40–28	(Denmark) GOG Håndbold	BBC-Arena, Schaffhausen; Attendance: 1,212; Referees: Mitrevski, Todorovski (MKD)
31 October 2019; 20:15	Császár 16	(18–11)	Gidsel 6	BBC-Arena, Schaffhausen; Attendance: 1,212; Referees: Mitrevski, Todorovski (MKD)
31 October 2019; 20:15	2× (yellow card) 6× (suspension)	Report	3× (yellow card) 6× (suspension)	BBC-Arena, Schaffhausen; Attendance: 1,212; Referees: Mitrevski, Todorovski (MKD)

2 November 2019; 15:00	Chekhovskiye Medvedi (Russia)	37–26	(Sweden) IFK Kristianstad	Olimpiysky Sport Palace, Chekhov; Attendance: 1,500; Referees: Leandersson, Lindroos (FIN)
2 November 2019; 15:00	Kornev 7	(20–16)	Ehn, Einarsson 5	Olimpiysky Sport Palace, Chekhov; Attendance: 1,500; Referees: Leandersson, Lindroos (FIN)
2 November 2019; 15:00	2× (yellow card) 4× (suspension)	Report	2× (yellow card) 3× (suspension)	Olimpiysky Sport Palace, Chekhov; Attendance: 1,500; Referees: Leandersson, Lindroos (FIN)

6 November 2019; 17:15	CS Dinamo București (Romania)	27–26	(Switzerland) Kadetten Schaffhausen	Dinamo Polyvalent Hall, Bucharest; Attendance: 2,023; Referees: Bounouara, Sami (FRA)
6 November 2019; 17:15	Kuduz 10	(15–14)	Császár 6	Dinamo Polyvalent Hall, Bucharest; Attendance: 2,023; Referees: Bounouara, Sami (FRA)
6 November 2019; 17:15	2× (yellow card) 4× (suspension)	Report	1× (yellow card) 7× (suspension)	Dinamo Polyvalent Hall, Bucharest; Attendance: 2,023; Referees: Bounouara, Sami (FRA)

10 November 2019; 15:10	GOG Håndbold (Denmark)	37–37	(Sweden) IFK Kristianstad	Jyske Bank Arena, Odense; Attendance: 3,656; Referees: Mandák, Rudinský (SVK)
10 November 2019; 15:10	Møller 7	(15–19)	Nyfjäll 8	Jyske Bank Arena, Odense; Attendance: 3,656; Referees: Mandák, Rudinský (SVK)
10 November 2019; 15:10	3× (yellow card) 3× (suspension)	Report	3× (yellow card) 4× (suspension) 1× (red card)	Jyske Bank Arena, Odense; Attendance: 3,656; Referees: Mandák, Rudinský (SVK)

10 November 2019; 18:00	Orlen Wisła Płock (Poland)	34–28	(Russia) Chekhovskiye Medvedi	Orlen Arena, Płock; Attendance: 3,200; Referees: Tzaferopoulos, Bethmann (GRE)
10 November 2019; 18:00	Mindegía 10	(18–15)	K.Kotov 6	Orlen Arena, Płock; Attendance: 3,200; Referees: Tzaferopoulos, Bethmann (GRE)
10 November 2019; 18:00	3× (yellow card) 5× (suspension)	Report	1× (yellow card) 3× (suspension)	Orlen Arena, Płock; Attendance: 3,200; Referees: Tzaferopoulos, Bethmann (GRE)

13 November 2019; 19:00	IFK Kristianstad (Sweden)	29–29	(Romania) CS Dinamo București	Kristianstad Arena, Kristianstad; Attendance: 3,402; Referees: Bolic, Hurich (AUT)
13 November 2019; 19:00	eight players 3	(16–17)	Kuduz 6	Kristianstad Arena, Kristianstad; Attendance: 3,402; Referees: Bolic, Hurich (AUT)
13 November 2019; 19:00	1× (yellow card) 2× (suspension)	Report	1× (yellow card) 5× (suspension)	Kristianstad Arena, Kristianstad; Attendance: 3,402; Referees: Bolic, Hurich (AUT)

16 November 2019; 14:00	Chekhovskiye Medvedi (Russia)	36–28	(Denmark) GOG Håndbold	Olimpiysky Sport Palace, Chekhov; Attendance: 1,750; Referees: Andorka, Hucker (HUN)
16 November 2019; 14:00	Santalov 8	(15–18)	Jakobsen, Ríkharðsson 7	Olimpiysky Sport Palace, Chekhov; Attendance: 1,750; Referees: Andorka, Hucker (HUN)
16 November 2019; 14:00	2× (yellow card) 7× (suspension) 1× (red card)	Report	1× (yellow card) 5× (suspension)	Olimpiysky Sport Palace, Chekhov; Attendance: 1,750; Referees: Andorka, Hucker (HUN)

17 November 2019; 19:00	Kadetten Schaffhausen (Switzerland)	24–27	(Poland) Orlen Wisła Płock	BBC-Arena, Schaffhausen; Attendance: 1,165; Referees: Erdoğan, Özdeniz (TUR)
17 November 2019; 19:00	Šešum 6	(11–10)	Szita 5	BBC-Arena, Schaffhausen; Attendance: 1,165; Referees: Erdoğan, Özdeniz (TUR)
17 November 2019; 19:00	2× (yellow card) 4× (suspension)	Report	4× (yellow card) 6× (suspension)	BBC-Arena, Schaffhausen; Attendance: 1,165; Referees: Erdoğan, Özdeniz (TUR)

20 November 2019; 18:00	CS Dinamo București (Romania)	34–23	(Russia) Chekhovskiye Medvedi	Dinamo Polyvalent Hall, Bucharest; Attendance: 2,100; Referees: Budzák, Záhradník (SVK)
20 November 2019; 18:00	Bannour 7	(15–13)	A.Kotov, Ostashchenko 5	Dinamo Polyvalent Hall, Bucharest; Attendance: 2,100; Referees: Budzák, Záhradník (SVK)
20 November 2019; 18:00	3× (yellow card) 5× (suspension)	Report	2× (yellow card) 2× (suspension)	Dinamo Polyvalent Hall, Bucharest; Attendance: 2,100; Referees: Budzák, Záhradník (SVK)

23 November 2019; 15:00	Orlen Wisła Płock (Poland)	27–24	(Denmark) GOG Håndbold	Orlen Arena, Płock; Attendance: 3,900; Referees: Cindrić, Gonzurek (CRO)
23 November 2019; 15:00	Mindegía 7	(11–13)	Møller 7	Orlen Arena, Płock; Attendance: 3,900; Referees: Cindrić, Gonzurek (CRO)
23 November 2019; 15:00	3× (yellow card) 3× (suspension)	Report	2× (yellow card) 2× (suspension)	Orlen Arena, Płock; Attendance: 3,900; Referees: Cindrić, Gonzurek (CRO)

24 November 2019; 19:00	Kadetten Schaffhausen (Switzerland)	26–29	(Sweden) IFK Kristianstad	BBC-Arena, Schaffhausen; Attendance: 916; Referees: Konjičanin, Konjičanin (BIH)
24 November 2019; 19:00	four players 4	(15–15)	Guðmundsson 8	BBC-Arena, Schaffhausen; Attendance: 916; Referees: Konjičanin, Konjičanin (BIH)
24 November 2019; 19:00	2× (yellow card) 4× (suspension)	Report	2× (yellow card) 4× (suspension)	BBC-Arena, Schaffhausen; Attendance: 916; Referees: Konjičanin, Konjičanin (BIH)

27 November 2019; 19:00	IFK Kristianstad (Sweden)	24–20	(Poland) Orlen Wisła Płock	Kristianstad Arena, Kristianstad; Attendance: 3,036; Referees: Andorka, Hucker (HUN)
27 November 2019; 19:00	Chrintz 10	(15–9)	Mlakar 7	Kristianstad Arena, Kristianstad; Attendance: 3,036; Referees: Andorka, Hucker (HUN)
27 November 2019; 19:00	1× (yellow card) 2× (suspension)	Report	4× (yellow card) 2× (suspension)	Kristianstad Arena, Kristianstad; Attendance: 3,036; Referees: Andorka, Hucker (HUN)

30 November 2019; 14:00	Chekhovskiye Medvedi (Russia)	29–27	(Switzerland) Kadetten Schaffhausen	Olimpiysky Sport Palace, Chekhov; Attendance: 1,700; Referees: Opava, Válek (CZE)
30 November 2019; 14:00	K. Kotov 7	(14–14)	Frimmel 8	Olimpiysky Sport Palace, Chekhov; Attendance: 1,700; Referees: Opava, Válek (CZE)
30 November 2019; 14:00	3× (yellow card) 1× (suspension)	Report	3× (yellow card) 4× (suspension)	Olimpiysky Sport Palace, Chekhov; Attendance: 1,700; Referees: Opava, Válek (CZE)

1 December 2019; 16:50	GOG Håndbold (Denmark)	31–32	(Romania) CS Dinamo București	Jyske Bank Arena, Odense; Attendance: 2,607; Referees: Schulze, Tönnies (GER)
1 December 2019; 16:50	Lærke 10	(16–18)	Bannour 9	Jyske Bank Arena, Odense; Attendance: 2,607; Referees: Schulze, Tönnies (GER)
1 December 2019; 16:50	2× (yellow card) 5× (suspension)	Report	1× (yellow card) 4× (suspension)	Jyske Bank Arena, Odense; Attendance: 2,607; Referees: Schulze, Tönnies (GER)

== Playoffs ==
The top two teams from Groups C and D contested a playoff to determine the two sides advancing to the knockout phase. The winners of each group faced the runners-up of the other group in a two-legged tie.

=== Overview ===
Team 1	Agg.	Team 2	1st leg	2nd leg
Sporting CP (Portugal)	49–52	(Romania) CS Dinamo București	25–26	24–26
Orlen Wisła Płock (Poland)	51–49	(Spain) Bidasoa Irun	32–25	19–24

=== Matches ===
22 February 2020; 19:30	Sporting CP (Portugal)	25–26	(Romania) CS Dinamo București	Pavilhão João Rocha, Lisbon; Attendance: 2,468; Referees: Jørum, Kleven (NOR)
22 February 2020; 19:30	Ghionea 8	(9–13)	Kuduz 7	Pavilhão João Rocha, Lisbon; Attendance: 2,468; Referees: Jørum, Kleven (NOR)
22 February 2020; 19:30	1× (yellow card) 4× (suspension)	Report	2× (yellow card) 5× (suspension)	Pavilhão João Rocha, Lisbon; Attendance: 2,468; Referees: Jørum, Kleven (NOR)

1 March 2020; 16:30	CS Dinamo București (Romania)	26–24	(Portugal) Sporting CP	Dinamo Polyvalent Hall, Bucharest; Attendance: 2,500; Referees: Geipel, Helbig (GER)
1 March 2020; 16:30	Asoltanei 7	(15–12)	Ghionea 5	Dinamo Polyvalent Hall, Bucharest; Attendance: 2,500; Referees: Geipel, Helbig (GER)
1 March 2020; 16:30	2× (yellow card) 2× (suspension) 1× (red card)	Report	2× (yellow card) 2× (suspension) 1× (red card)	Dinamo Polyvalent Hall, Bucharest; Attendance: 2,500; Referees: Geipel, Helbig (GER)

CS Dinamo București won 52–49 on aggregate.

22 February 2020; 15:00	Orlen Wisła Płock (Poland)	32–25	(Spain) Bidasoa Irun	Orlen Arena, Płock; Attendance: 3,500; Referees: Bonaventura, Bonaventura (FRA)
22 February 2020; 15:00	Daszek 9	(17–11)	Azkue 7	Orlen Arena, Płock; Attendance: 3,500; Referees: Bonaventura, Bonaventura (FRA)
22 February 2020; 15:00	1× (yellow card) 6× (suspension) 1× (red card)	Report	2× (yellow card) 2× (suspension)	Orlen Arena, Płock; Attendance: 3,500; Referees: Bonaventura, Bonaventura (FRA)

29 February 2020; 16:00	Bidasoa Irun (Spain)	24–19	(Poland) Orlen Wisła Płock	Pabellón Polideportivo Artaleku, Irun; Attendance: 1,911; Referees: Gjeding, Hansen (DEN)
29 February 2020; 16:00	Renaud-David 6	(10–12)	Szita 7	Pabellón Polideportivo Artaleku, Irun; Attendance: 1,911; Referees: Gjeding, Hansen (DEN)
29 February 2020; 16:00	1× (yellow card) 6× (suspension)	Report	10× (suspension)	Pabellón Polideportivo Artaleku, Irun; Attendance: 1,911; Referees: Gjeding, Hansen (DEN)

Orlen Wisła Płock won 51–49 on aggregate.
