= 2019–20 EHF Champions League knockout stage =

The 2019–20 EHF Champions League knockout stage was scheduled to begin on 18 March with the round of 16 and end on 31 May 2020 with the final at the Lanxess Arena in Cologne, Germany, to decide the winners of the 2019–20 EHF Champions League. A total of 14 teams would have competed in the knockout phase, including the top six teams from Groups A and B and the two winners of the playoffs between the top two teams from Groups C and D.

On 25 March, the EHF announced that no matches would be played before June due to the COVID-19 pandemic. Afterwards, it was decided just to play the final four.

== Format ==
In the round of 16, the ten teams ranked 2nd–6th in Groups A and B plus the two winners from the playoffs between the top two teams from Groups C and D play against each other in two-legged home-and-away matches. The six winning teams advance to the quarterfinals, where they are joined by the winners of Groups A and B for another round of two-legged home-and-away matches. The four quarterfinal winners qualify for the final four tournament at the Lanxess Arena in Cologne, Germany.

== Qualified teams ==
The top six teams from Groups A and B and the two playoff winners qualify for the knockout stage.

Group	Qualified for quarterfinals	Qualified for Round of 16				
Group	First place	Second place	Third place	Fourth place	Fifth place	Sixth place
A	(Spain) Barça	(France) Paris Saint-Germain	(Hungary) MOL-Pick Szeged	(Denmark) Aalborg Håndbold	(Germany) SG Flensburg-Handewitt	(Slovenia) Celje Pivovarna Laško
B	(Germany) THW Kiel	(Hungary) Telekom Veszprém	(Poland) PGE Vive Kielce	(France) Montpellier Handball	(Portugal) FC Porto Sofarma	(North Macedonia) Vardar
Playoff winners	(Poland) Orlen Wisła Płock (Romania) CS Dinamo București					

== Round of 16 ==
On 13 March 2020, the EHF announced that the round of 16 matches would not be held as scheduled due to the ongoing coronavirus pandemic in Europe. A new competition schedule proposed by the EHF on 25 March foresees the first and second legs being played in the first week of June, with a cancellation deadline on 15 May. The matches were cancelled on 24 April 2020.

=== Overview ===
Team 1	Agg.	Team 2	1st leg	2nd leg
CS Dinamo București (Romania)	M1	(France) Paris Saint-Germain	Cancelled	Cancelled
Orlen Wisła Płock (Poland)	M2	(Hungary) Telekom Veszprém	Cancelled	Cancelled
Vardar (North Macedonia)	M3	(Hungary) MOL-Pick Szeged	Cancelled	Cancelled
Celje Pivovarna Laško (Slovenia)	M4	(Poland) PGE Vive Kielce	Cancelled	Cancelled
FC Porto Sofarma (Portugal)	M5	(Denmark) Aalborg Håndbold	Cancelled	Cancelled
SG Flensburg-Handewitt (Germany)	M6	(France) Montpellier Handball	Cancelled	Cancelled

=== Matches ===
CS Dinamo București (Romania)	Cancelled	(France) Paris Saint-Germain

Paris Saint-Germain (France)	Cancelled	(Romania) CS Dinamo București

Orlen Wisła Płock (Poland)	Cancelled	(Hungary) Telekom Veszprém

Telekom Veszprém (Hungary)	Cancelled	(Poland) Orlen Wisła Płock

Vardar (North Macedonia)	Cancelled	(Hungary) MOL-Pick Szeged

MOL-Pick Szeged (Hungary)	Cancelled	(North Macedonia) Vardar

Celje Pivovarna Laško (Slovenia)	Cancelled	(Poland) PGE Vive Kielce

PGE Vive Kielce (Poland)	Cancelled	(Slovenia) Celje Pivovarna Laško

FC Porto Sofarma (Portugal)	Cancelled	(Denmark) Aalborg Håndbold

Aalborg Håndbold (Denmark)	Cancelled	(Portugal) FC Porto Sofarma

SG Flensburg-Handewitt (Germany)	Cancelled	(France) Montpellier Handball

Montpellier Handball (France)	Cancelled	(Germany) SG Flensburg-Handewitt

== Quarterfinals ==
The quarterfinals were rescheduled on 25 March 2020. The matches were cancelled on 24 April 2020.

=== Overview ===
Team 1	Agg.	Team 2	1st leg	2nd leg
M6	–	(Spain) Barça	Cancelled	Cancelled
M5	–	(Germany) THW Kiel	Cancelled	Cancelled
M4	–	M1	Cancelled	Cancelled
M3	–	M2	Cancelled	Cancelled

=== Matches ===
M6	Cancelled	(Spain) Barça

Barça (Spain)	Cancelled	M6

M5	Cancelled	(Germany) THW Kiel

THW Kiel (Germany)	Cancelled	M5

M4	Cancelled	M1

M1	Cancelled	M4

M3	Cancelled	M2

M2	Cancelled	M3

== Final four ==
The final four was scheduled to be held at the Lanxess Arena in Cologne, Germany on 30 and 31 May but was rescheduled to 22 and 23 August 2020, and later to 28 and 29 December 2020. Because of the cancellation of the last 16 and quarterfinals, the first two-placed teams from the group stage groups will play in the final four. The draw was held on 10 November 2020.

=== Bracket ===
Semifinals
28 December
(Germany) THW Kiel	36
(Hungary) Telekom Veszprém	35
28 December
(Spain) Barça	37
(France) Paris Saint-Germain	32

Final
29 December
(Germany) THW Kiel	33
(Spain) Barça	28
Third place
29 December
(Hungary) Telekom Veszprém	26
(France) Paris Saint-Germain	31

=== Semifinals ===
28 December 2020; 18:00	Barça (Spain)	37–32	(France) Paris Saint-Germain	Lanxess Arena, Cologne; Attendance: 0 (Note: The match was played behind closed doors due to the COVID-19 pandemic.); Referees: Gubica, Milošević (CRO)
28 December 2020; 18:00	Mem 8	(18–14)	Nahi 9	Lanxess Arena, Cologne; Attendance: 0 Referees: Gubica, Milošević (CRO)
28 December 2020; 18:00	3× (suspension)	Report	2× (yellow card) 2× (suspension)	Lanxess Arena, Cologne; Attendance: 0 Referees: Gubica, Milošević (CRO)

28 December 2020
20:30
THW Kiel (Germany)
36–35 (ET)
(Hungary) Telekom Veszprém
Lanxess Arena, Cologne
Attendance: 0
Referees: Marìn, García (ESP)
Pekeler 8
(18–13)
Borozan, Marguc 7
1× (yellow card) 7× (suspension) 1× (red card)
Report
1× (yellow card) 5× (suspension)

FT: 29–29 ET: 7–6

=== Third place game ===
29 December 2020; 18:00	Telekom Veszprém (Hungary)	26–31	(France) Paris Saint-Germain	Lanxess Arena, Cologne; Attendance: 0 Referees: Pavićević, Ražnatović (MNE)
29 December 2020; 18:00	Lékai 9	(11–14)	Prandi, Remili 6	Lanxess Arena, Cologne; Attendance: 0 Referees: Pavićević, Ražnatović (MNE)
29 December 2020; 18:00	1× (yellow card) 6× (suspension)	Report	1× (yellow card) 3× (suspension)	Lanxess Arena, Cologne; Attendance: 0 Referees: Pavićević, Ražnatović (MNE)

=== Final ===
29 December 2020; 20:30	THW Kiel (Germany)	33–28	(Spain) Barça	Lanxess Arena, Cologne; Attendance: 0 Referees: Gubica, Milošević (CRO)
29 December 2020; 20:30	Ekberg 8	(19–16)	Gómez 10	Lanxess Arena, Cologne; Attendance: 0 Referees: Gubica, Milošević (CRO)
29 December 2020; 20:30	1× (yellow card) 5× (suspension)	Report	4× (suspension)	Lanxess Arena, Cologne; Attendance: 0 Referees: Gubica, Milošević (CRO)
