= 2019–20 EHF Champions League =

European club handball tournament

EHF Champions League
- 2019–20

Tournament information
- Sport: Handball
- Location: Lanxess Arena (FINAL4)
- Dates: 11 September 2019–29 December 2020
- Teams: 28 (group stage)
- Website: ehfcl.com

Final positions
- Champions: (Germany) THW Kiel
- Runner-up: (Spain) Barça

Tournament statistics
- Matches played: 180
- Goals scored: 10715 (59.53 per match)
- Attendance: 553,901 (3,077 per match)
- Top scorer(s): (Sweden) Niclas Ekberg (85 goals)

The 2019–20 EHF Champions League was the 60th edition of Europe's premier club handball tournament and the 27th edition under the current EHF Champions League format.

Because of the COVID-19 pandemic in Europe, the knockout stage matches were postponed and later cancelled. The Final Four, which took place at the Lanxess Arena in Cologne, Germany, was moved from May to December and was contested by the top two teams from Groups A and B – Barça, Paris Saint-Germain, THW Kiel and Telekom Veszprém. As a result, reigning champions Vardar were not able to defend their title.

== Format ==
The competition begins with a group stage featuring twenty-eight teams divided in four groups: Groups A and B contain eight teams, while Groups C and D contain six teams. Matches are played in a double round-robin system with home-and-away fixtures. In Groups A and B, the top six teams qualify for the knockout stage, with teams ranked 2nd–6th entering the round of 16 and the group winners advancing directly to the quarter-finals. In Groups C and D, only the top two teams advance to a compete in a two-legged play-off round, with the two winners going through to the knockout stage round of 16.

The knockout stage includes four rounds: the round of 16, quarterfinals, and a final-four tournament comprising two semifinals and the final. In the round of 16, twelve teams (ten from Groups A and B, and the two play-off winners from Groups C and D) are paired against each other in two-legged home-and-away matches. The six aggregate winners of the round of 16 advance to the quarterfinals, joining the winners of Groups A and B. The eight quarterfinalist teams are paired against each other in two-legged home-and-away matches, with the four aggregate winners qualifying to the final-four tournament.

In the final four tournament, the semifinals and the final are played as single matches at a pre-selected host venue.

== Team allocation ==
A total of 35 teams from 21 countries submitted their application for a place in the competition's group stage before the deadline of 12 June. The final list of 28 participants was revealed by the EHF Executive Committee on 21 June.

Groups A/B
(Belarus) HC Meshkov Brest	(Croatia) PPD Zagreb	(Denmark) Aalborg Handbold	(Germany) SG Flensburg-Handewitt
(Spain) Barça	(France) Paris Saint-Germain	(Hungary) Telekom Veszprém	(North Macedonia) Vardar
(Norway) Elverum Håndball	(Poland) PGE Vive Kielce	(Portugal) FC Porto Sofarma	(Slovenia) Celje Pivovarna Laško
(Ukraine) HC Motor Zaporizhzhia	(Germany) THW Kiel	(France) Montpellier Handball	(Hungary) MOL-Pick Szeged
Groups C/D
(Finland) Riihimäki Cocks	(Romania) CS Dinamo București	(Russia) Chekhovskiye Medvedi	(Sweden) IK Sävehof
(Switzerland) Kadetten Schaffhausen	(Slovakia) Tatran Prešov	(Denmark) GOG Håndbold	(Spain) Bidasoa Irun
(North Macedonia) Eurofarm Rabotnik	(Poland) Orlen Wisła Płock	(Portugal) Sporting CP	(Sweden) IFK Kristianstad

== Round and draw dates ==
The draw was held on 27 June 2019 in Vienna, Austria.

Phase	Draw date
Group stage	27 June 2019
Knockout stage	27 June 2019
Final Four (Cologne)	5 May 2020

== Group stage ==
Location of teams of the 2019–20 EHF Champions League group stage.
Red: Group A; Blue: Group B; Green: Group C; Yellow: Group D.

The draw for the group stage was held on 27 June 2019 in Vienna, Austria. The teams were drawn into four groups, two containing eight teams (Groups A and B) and two containing six teams (Groups C and D). The only restriction was that teams from the same national association could not face each other in the same group.

In each group, teams played against each other in a double round-robin format, with home and away matches.

After completion of the group stage matches, the teams advancing to the knockout stage were determined in the following manner:

- Groups A and B – the top team qualified directly for the quarterfinals, and the five teams ranked 2nd–6th advanced to the first knockout round.
- Groups C and D – the top two teams from both groups contested a playoff to determine the last two sides joining the 10 teams from Groups A and B in the first knockout round.

Tiebreakers
In the group stage, teams are ranked according to points (2 points for a win, 1 point for a draw, 0 points for a loss). After completion of the group stage, if two or more teams have scored the same number of points, the ranking will be determined as follows:
1. Highest number of points in matches between the teams directly involved;
2. Superior goal difference in matches between the teams directly involved;
3. Highest number of goals scored in matches between the teams directly involved (or in the away match in case of a two-team tie);
4. Superior goal difference in all matches of the group;
5. Highest number of plus goals in all matches of the group;

If the ranking of one of these teams is determined, the above criteria are consecutively followed until the ranking of all teams is determined. If no ranking can be determined, a decision shall be obtained by EHF through drawing of lots.

During the group stage, only criteria 4–5 apply to determine the provisional ranking of teams.

=== Group A ===
Pos	Team	Pld	W	D	L	GF	GA	GD	Pts	Qualification	BAR	PAR	SZE	ALB	FLE	CEL	ZAG	ELV
1	(Spain) Barça	14	13	0	1	485	380	+105	26	Quarterfinals	—	36–32	30–28	44–35	31–27	45–21	32–23	33–24
2	(France) Paris Saint-Germain	14	11	0	3	444	389	+55	22	First knockout round	32–35	—	30–25	37–24	32–30	27–18	37–26	31–25
3	(Hungary) MOL-Pick Szeged	14	9	2	3	409	370	+39	20	First knockout round	31–28	32–29	—	26–26	24–24	31–24	33–23	32–25
4	(Denmark) Aalborg Håndbold	14	7	1	6	416	420	−4	15 (Note: Aalborg Håndbold 63–57 SG Flensburg-Handewitt)	First knockout round	30–34	29–32	28–35	—	31–28	28–24	30–20	30–28
5	(Germany) SG Flensburg-Handewitt	14	7	1	6	388	379	+9	15	First knockout round	27–34	29–30	34–26	29–32	—	29–26	20–17	26–19
6	(Slovenia) Celje Pivovarna Laško	14	3	0	11	355	429	−74	6	First knockout round	25–37	29–33	23–34	28–29	24–25	—	24–22	32–25
7	(Croatia) PPD Zagreb	14	2	1	11	343	419	−76	5		19–36	29–37	21–26	31–30	25–26	27–31	—	30–27
8	(Norway) Elverum Håndball	14	1	1	12	365	419	−54	3		26–30	22–25	25–26	24–34	28–34	37–26	30–30	—

Source: EHF

=== Group B ===
Pos	Team	Pld	W	D	L	GF	GA	GD	Pts	Qualification	THW	VES	KIE	MON	POR	VAR	BRE	ZAP
1	(Germany) THW Kiel	14	9	2	3	437	398	+39	20 (Note: THW Kiel 66–59 Telekom Veszprém)	Quarterfinals	—	29–28	30–30	33–32	27–28	34–23	31–23	32–32
2	(Hungary) Telekom Veszprém	14	10	0	4	448	386	+62	20	First knockout round	31–37	—	28–24	24–23	38–28	39–30	31–25	40–28
3	(Poland) PGE Vive Kielce	14	8	2	4	421	389	+32	18	First knockout round	32–30	34–33	—	27–29	30–25	35–25	30–24	33–26
4	(France) Montpellier Handball	14	8	1	5	386	375	+11	17	First knockout round	30–33	23–18	25–24	—	22–27	31–33	30–26	34–30
5	(Portugal) FC Porto Sofarma	14	6	2	6	400	410	−10	14	First knockout round	29–30	24–31	33–30	23–23	—	30–22	27–25	35–35
6	(North Macedonia) Vardar	14	5	1	8	396	444	−48	11	First knockout round	20–30	29–38	28–28	27–31	32–27	—	36–31	38–28
7	(Belarus) HC Meshkov Brest	14	4	0	10	401	431	−30	8		33–30	30–37	27–31	25–27	32–35	31–22	—	33–31
8	(Ukraine) HC Motor Zaporizhzhia	14	1	2	11	406	462	−56	4		27–30	22–32	26–33	25–26	33–29	30–31	33–36	—

Source: EHF

=== Group C ===
Pos	Team	Pld	W	D	L	GF	GA	GD	Pts	Qualification	BID	SPO	SÄV	PRE	RII	RAB
1	(Spain) Bidasoa Irun	10	6	3	1	297	246	+51	15	Playoffs	—	30–30	39–23	27–27	34–19	26–25
2	(Portugal) Sporting CP	10	6	2	2	309	266	+43	14	Playoffs	32–32	—	27–20	32–24	39–29	36–26
3	(Sweden) IK Sävehof	10	6	0	4	268	278	−10	12		24–33	29–24	—	30–29	28–22	25–24
4	(Slovakia) Tatran Prešov	10	3	1	6	260	279	−19	7		23–25	22–37	23–28	—	30–19	31–29
5	(Finland) Riihimäki Cocks	10	3	0	7	239	290	−51	6 (Note: Riihimäki Cocks 53–52 Eurofarm Rabotnik)		18–28	25–23	25–30	29–27	—	23–21
6	(North Macedonia) Eurofarm Rabotnik	10	3	0	7	265	279	−14	6		25–23	28–29	32–31	23–24	31–30	—

Source: EHF

=== Group D ===
Pos	Team	Pld	W	D	L	GF	GA	GD	Pts	Qualification	BUC	PLO	GOG	KRI	MED	SCH
1	(Romania) CS Dinamo București	10	7	3	0	298	256	+42	17	Playoffs	—	29–20	35–28	28–25	34–23	27–26
2	(Poland) Orlen Wisła Płock	10	5	1	4	267	260	+7	11	Playoffs	26–26	—	27–24	36–29	34–28	27–23
3	(Denmark) GOG Håndbold	10	4	1	5	310	319	−9	9 (Note: GOG Håndbold 70–61 IFK Kristianstad)		31–32	28–27	—	37–37	38–31	35–30
4	(Sweden) IFK Kristianstad	10	3	3	4	283	298	−15	9		29–29	24–20	24–33	—	36–28	24–24
5	(Russia) Chekhovskiye Medvedi	10	4	0	6	280	308	−28	8		20–30	25–23	36–28	37–26	—	29–27
6	(Switzerland) Kadetten Schaffhausen	10	2	2	6	280	277	+3	6		28–28	24–27	40–28	26–29	32–23	—

Source: EHF

=== Playoffs ===
The top two teams from Groups C and D contested a playoff to determine the two sides advancing to the knockout phase. The winners of each group faced the runners-up of the other group in a two-legged tie.

=== Overview ===
Team 1	Agg.	Team 2	1st leg	2nd leg
Sporting CP (Portugal)	49–52	(Romania) CS Dinamo București	25–26	24–26
Orlen Wisła Płock (Poland)	51–49	(Spain) Bidasoa Irun	32–25	19–24

== Knockout stage ==
The winners of Groups A and B would have advanced directly to the quarterfinals, while the teams ranked 2nd–6th to the round of 16 alongside the playoff winners. After the cancellation of the last 16 and quarterfinals on 24 April 2020, the top-two placed teams from each group played the final four.

=== Round of 16 ===
Team 1	Agg.	Team 2	1st leg	2nd leg
CS Dinamo București (Romania)	M1	(France) Paris Saint-Germain	Cancelled	Cancelled
Orlen Wisła Płock (Poland)	M2	(Hungary) Telekom Veszprém	Cancelled	Cancelled
Vardar (North Macedonia)	M3	(Hungary) MOL-Pick Szeged	Cancelled	Cancelled
Celje Pivovarna Laško (Slovenia)	M4	(Poland) PGE Vive Kielce	Cancelled	Cancelled
FC Porto Sofarma (Portugal)	M5	(Denmark) Aalborg Håndbold	Cancelled	Cancelled
SG Flensburg-Handewitt (Germany)	M6	(France) Montpellier Handball	Cancelled	Cancelled

=== Quarterfinals ===
Team 1	Agg.	Team 2	1st leg	2nd leg
M6	–	(Spain) Barça	Cancelled	Cancelled
M5	–	(Germany) THW Kiel	Cancelled	Cancelled
M4	–	M1	Cancelled	Cancelled
M3	–	M2	Cancelled	Cancelled

=== Final four ===
The final four was scheduled to be held at the Lanxess Arena in Cologne, Germany on 30 and 31 May but was rescheduled to 22 and 23 August 2020, and later to 28 and 29 December 2020. Because of the cancellation of the last 16 and quarterfinals, the first two-placed teams from the group stage groups will play in the final four. The draw was held on 10 November 2020.

=== Bracket ===
Semifinals
28 December
(Germany) THW Kiel	36
(Hungary) Telekom Veszprém	35
28 December
(Spain) Barça	37
(France) Paris Saint-Germain	32

Final
29 December
(Germany) THW Kiel	33
(Spain) Barça	28
Third place
29 December
(Hungary) Telekom Veszprém	26
(France) Paris Saint-Germain	31

==== Final ====
29 December 2020; 20:30	THW Kiel (Germany)	33–28	(Spain) Barça	Lanxess Arena, Cologne; Attendance: 0 (Note: The match was played behind closed doors due to the COVID-19 pandemic.); Referees: Gubica, Milošević (CRO)
29 December 2020; 20:30	Ekberg 8	(19–16)	Gómez 10	Lanxess Arena, Cologne; Attendance: 0 Referees: Gubica, Milošević (CRO)
29 December 2020; 20:30	1× (yellow card) 5× (suspension)	Report	4× (suspension)	Lanxess Arena, Cologne; Attendance: 0 Referees: Gubica, Milošević (CRO)

== Statistics and awards ==
=== Top goalscorers ===
Rank	Player	Club	Goals
1	(Sweden) Niclas Ekberg	(Germany) THW Kiel	85
2	(Norway) Sander Sagosen	(France) Paris SG/ (Germany) THW Kiel	76
3	(France) Hugo Descat	(France) Montpellier Handball	75
4	(Spain) Aleix Gómez	(Spain) Barça	74
4	(Belarus) Barys Pukhouski	(Ukraine) HC Motor Zaporizhzhia	74
6	(Russia) Timur Dibirov	(North Macedonia) Vardar	69
7	(Serbia) Petar Nenadić	(Hungary) Telekom Veszprém	67
8	(Norway) Sebastian Barthold	(Denmark) Aalborg Håndbold	65
8	(Spain) Alex Dujshebaev	(Poland) PGE Vive Kielce	65
8	(Ukraine) Vladislav Ostroushko	(North Macedonia) Eurofarm Rabotnik	65
8	(Germany) Hendrik Pekeler	(Germany) THW Kiel	65

=== Awards ===
The all-star team was announced on 12 June 2020.

- Goalkeeper: (Denmark) Niklas Landin
- Right wing: (Sweden) Niclas Ekberg
- Right back: (Spain) Alex Dujshebaev
- Centre back: (Denmark) Mikkel Hansen
- Left back: (Norway) Sander Sagosen
- Left wing: (Croatia) Manuel Štrlek
- Pivot: (Hungary) Bence Bánhidi

Other awards

- Best Defender: (Slovenia) Blaž Blagotinšek
- Best Young player: (Spain) Aleix Gómez
- Best Coach: (Spain) David Davis
