= Jonathan Edvardsson =

Swedish handball player (born 1997)

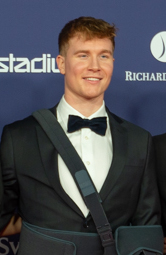
- Edvardsson at the 2023 Swedish Sports Awards

Personal information
- Nationality: Swedish
- Born: 7 April 1997 (age 29) Partille, Sweden
- Height: 1.90 m (6 ft 3 in)

Sport
- Sport: Handball
- Position: Centre back
- Current club: TSV Hannover-Burgdorf
- Number: 26

Youth career
- Years: Team
- –: IK Sävehof

Senior clubs
- Years: Team
- 2014–2021: IK Sävehof
- 2021–: TSV Hannover-Burgdorf
National team
Years	Team	Apps	(Gls)
2020–	Sweden	27	(18)
Medal record
World Championship
Silver medal – second place	2021 Egypt
European Championship
Gold medal – first place	2022 Hungary/Slovakia
Bronze medal – third place	2024 Germany
- Updated on 5 January 2025

Jonathan Edvardsson (born 7 April 1997) is a Swedish handball player. He was part of the Swedish national team that won silver medals at the 2021 World Men's Handball Championship in Egypt. A year later at the 2022 European Championship he won gold medals with Sweden.

With IK Sävehof he has become Swedish champion twice, 2019 and 2021. In the season of 2020/21 he was voted into the All-Star Team in the Swedish league Handbollsligan, and was also chosen as the MVP of the league. He was also given the award "Årets komet", which is handed to a Swedish player who has had their definite breakthrough during the year, and proved to be an important player both in their team and their league.
