= Igor Soroka =

Russian handball player

Personal information
- Nationality: Russian
- Born: 27 May 1991 (age 35) Cherkessk, Russia
- Height: 1.80 m (5 ft 11 in)

Sport
- Sport: Handball
- Position: Left wing
- Current club: HBC CSKA Moscow
- Number: 44

Senior clubs
- Years: Team
- 2013–2016: Permskie Medvedi
- 2016–2020: Motor Zaporizhzhia
- 2020–2022: CSKA Moscow
National team
Years	Team	Apps	(Gls)
2016–	Russia	51	(141)

Igor Soroka (born 27 May 1991) is a Russian handball player for HBC CSKA Moscow and the Russian national team.

He competed at the 2016 European Men's Handball Championship.
