= Alexander Kotov (handballer) =

Russian handball player

Personal information
- Nationality: Russian
- Born: 11 July 1994 (age 32) Volgograd, Russia
- Height: 1.98

Sport
- Sport: Handball
- Position: Right back
- Current club: Chekhovskiye Medvedi
- Number: 17
National team
Years	Team	Apps	(Gls)
–	Russia	14	(7)

Alexander Kotov (born 11 July 1994) is a Russian handball player for Chekhovskiye Medvedi and the Russian national team.

He represented Russia at the 2020 European Men's Handball Championship.
