= Partille =

Place in Partille Municipality, Sweden

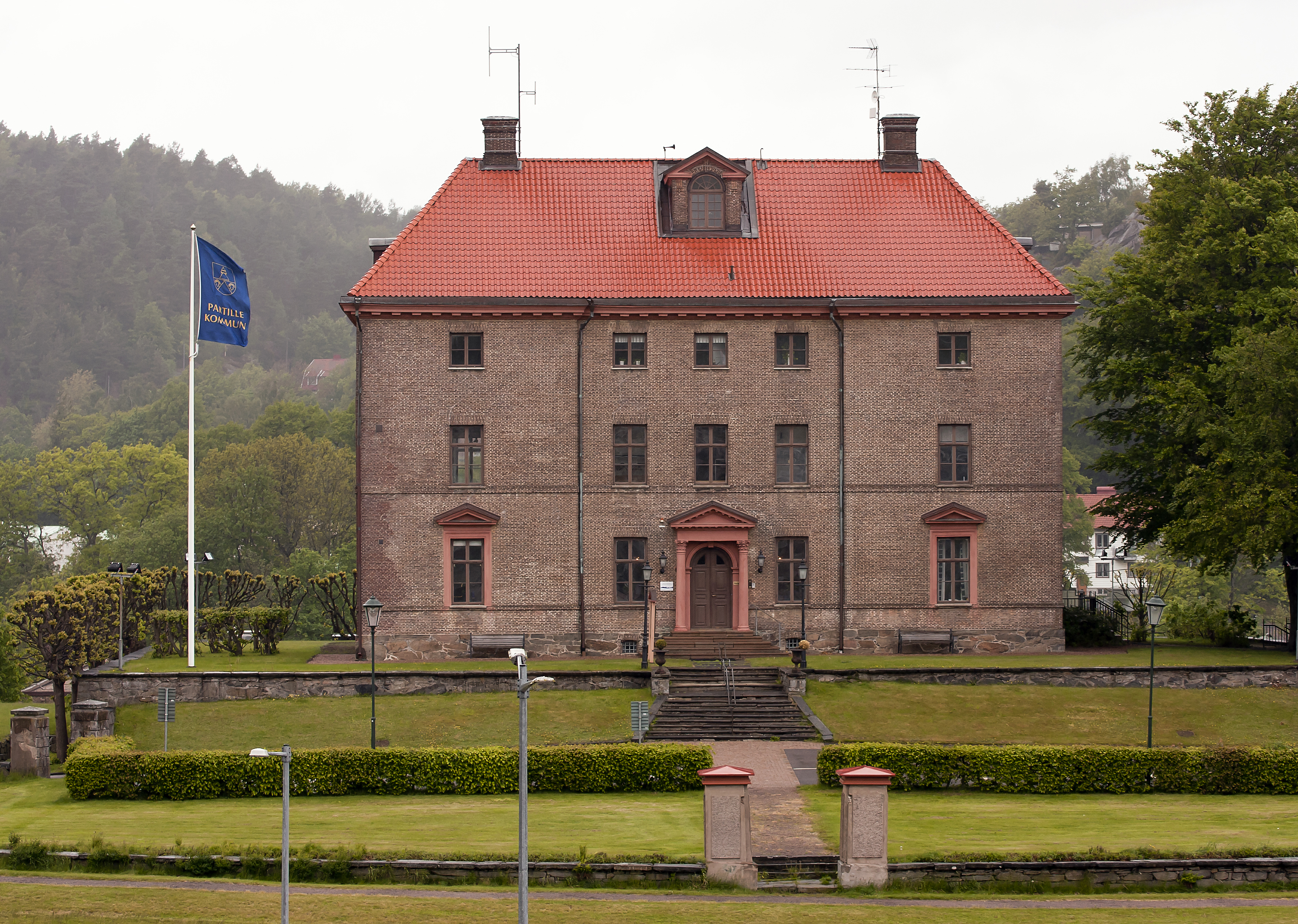
Partille Mansion

Partille (Swedish pronunciation: [ˈpâʈːɪlɛ]) is a former urban area in the county of Västra Götaland in Sweden. It is the seat of Partille Municipality.
