= 2021–22 EHF Champions League group stage =

The 2021–22 EHF Champions League group stage was played between 15 September 2021 and 10 March 2022 to determine the ten teams advancing to the knockout stage of the 2021–22 EHF Champions League.

== Draw ==
The draw was held on 2 July 2020 in Vienna, Austria.

=== Seeding ===
The composition of the seeding pots for the group stage draw was announced on 30 June 2021. From each pot, two teams were drawn into Group A and the other two in Group B. Teams from the same national association were not drawn into the same group.

Seeding pots for Groups A and B
Pot 1	Pot 2	Pot 3	Pot 4
(Spain) Barça (Germany) THW Kiel (Hungary) Pick Szeged (France) Paris Saint-Germain	(North Macedonia) Vardar 1961 (Denmark) Aalborg Håndbold (Poland) Łomża Vive Kielce (Portugal) FC Porto	(Belarus) Meshkov Brest (Germany) SG Flensburg-Handewitt (Hungary) Telekom Veszprém (France) Montpellier Handball	(Ukraine) Motor (Croatia) PPD Zagreb (Romania) Dinamo București (Norway) Elverum Håndball

== Format ==
In each group, teams played against each other in a double round-robin format, with home and away matches.

== Tiebreakers ==
In the group stage, teams are ranked according to points (2 points for a win, 1 point for a draw, 0 points for a loss). After completion of the group stage, if two or more teams have the same number of points, the ranking is determined as follows:

1. Highest number of points in matches between the teams directly involved;
2. Superior goal difference in matches between the teams directly involved;
3. Highest number of goals scored in matches between the teams directly involved (or in the away match in case of a two-team tie);
4. Superior goal difference in all matches of the group;
5. Highest number of plus goals in all matches of the group;

If the ranking of one of these teams is determined, the above criteria are consecutively followed until the ranking of all teams is determined. If no ranking can be determined, a decision shall be obtained by EHF through drawing of lots.

== Groups ==
The matchdays were 15–16 September, 22–23 September, 29–30 September, 13–14 October, 20–21 October, 27–28 October, 17–18 November, 24–25 November, 1–2 December, 8–9 December 2021, 16–17 February, 23–24 February, 2–3 March, 9–10 March 2022.

Times until 30 October 2021 are UTC+2, from 31 October 2021 on times are UTC+1.

Due to the COVID-19 pandemic, each local health department allows a different number of spectators.

=== Group A ===
Pos	Team	Pld	W	D	L	GF	GA	GD	Pts	Qualification
1	(Denmark) Aalborg Håndbold	14	11	0	3	453	410	+43	22	Quarterfinals
2	(Germany) THW Kiel	14	10	1	3	427	395	+32	21	Quarterfinals
3	(Hungary) Pick Szeged	14	8	3	3	412	392	+20	19	Playoffs
4	(France) Montpellier Handball	14	7	3	4	424	409	+15	17	Playoffs
5	(North Macedonia) RK Vardar	14	6	1	7	379	368	+11	13	Playoffs
6	(Norway) Elverum Håndball	14	3	2	9	417	449	−32	8 (Note: Elverum 57–52 Zagreb)	Playoffs
7	(Croatia) PPD Zagreb	14	3	2	9	351	385	−34	8	
8	(Belarus) Meshkov Brest	14	1	2	11	342	397	−55	4	

Source: EHF
Rules for classification: Tiebreakers
Notes:

15 September 2021; 18:45	Meshkov Brest (Belarus)	30–33	(Germany) THW Kiel	Universal Sports Complex Victoria, Brest; Attendance: 1,650; Referees: Erdoğan, Özdeniz (TUR)
15 September 2021; 18:45	three players 6	(15–18)	Ekberg 11	Universal Sports Complex Victoria, Brest; Attendance: 1,650; Referees: Erdoğan, Özdeniz (TUR)
15 September 2021; 18:45	1× (yellow card) 2× (suspension)	Report	2× (yellow card) 3× (suspension)	Universal Sports Complex Victoria, Brest; Attendance: 1,650; Referees: Erdoğan, Özdeniz (TUR)

15 September 2021; 18:45	Montpellier Handball (France)	29–29	(Hungary) Pick Szeged	Sud de France Arena, Montpellier; Attendance: 3,500; Referees: Santos, Fonseca (POR)
15 September 2021; 18:45	six players 3	(14–15)	Frimmel 8	Sud de France Arena, Montpellier; Attendance: 3,500; Referees: Santos, Fonseca (POR)
15 September 2021; 18:45	1× (yellow card) 3× (suspension)	Report	2× (yellow card) 1× (suspension)	Sud de France Arena, Montpellier; Attendance: 3,500; Referees: Santos, Fonseca (POR)

15 September 2021; 18:45	Elverum Håndball (Norway)	27–27	(North Macedonia) RK Vardar	Terningen Arena, Elverum; Attendance: 940; Referees: Horáček, Novotný (CZE)
15 September 2021; 18:45	Heldal, Máthé 6	(13–13)	Toto 6	Terningen Arena, Elverum; Attendance: 940; Referees: Horáček, Novotný (CZE)
15 September 2021; 18:45	1× (suspension)	Report	1× (yellow card) 4× (suspension) 1× (red card)	Terningen Arena, Elverum; Attendance: 940; Referees: Horáček, Novotný (CZE)

15 September 2021; 20:45	PPD Zagreb (Croatia)	24–34	(Denmark) Aalborg Håndbold	Arena Zagreb, Zagreb; Attendance: 325; Referees: Marín, García (ESP)
15 September 2021; 20:45	Klarica, Mandić 5	(14–18)	Barthold 9	Arena Zagreb, Zagreb; Attendance: 325; Referees: Marín, García (ESP)
15 September 2021; 20:45	1× (yellow card) 6× (suspension)	Report	4× (suspension)	Arena Zagreb, Zagreb; Attendance: 325; Referees: Marín, García (ESP)

22 September 2021; 18:45	Pick Szeged (Hungary)	30–21	(Croatia) PPD Zagreb	Újszegedi Sportcsarnok, Szeged; Attendance: 2,500; Referees: Schulze, Tönnies (GER)
22 September 2021; 18:45	Šoštarič 7	(10–7)	Klis, Vistorop 4	Újszegedi Sportcsarnok, Szeged; Attendance: 2,500; Referees: Schulze, Tönnies (GER)
22 September 2021; 18:45	2× (yellow card) 5× (suspension)	Report	2× (yellow card) 2× (suspension)	Újszegedi Sportcsarnok, Szeged; Attendance: 2,500; Referees: Schulze, Tönnies (GER)

22 September 2021; 18:45	Aalborg Håndbold (Denmark)	36–28	(France) Montpellier Handball	Gigantium, Aalborg; Attendance: 4,237; Referees: Mandák, Rudinský (SVK)
22 September 2021; 18:45	Sandell 11	(18–13)	Villeminot 7	Gigantium, Aalborg; Attendance: 4,237; Referees: Mandák, Rudinský (SVK)
22 September 2021; 18:45	1× (yellow card) 4× (suspension)	Report	7× (suspension)	Gigantium, Aalborg; Attendance: 4,237; Referees: Mandák, Rudinský (SVK)

22 September 2021; 20:45	RK Vardar (North Macedonia)	35–27	(Belarus) Meshkov Brest	Jane Sandanski Arena, Skopje; Attendance: 1,950; Referees: Brkic, Jusufhodzic (AUT)
22 September 2021; 20:45	Nyokas 8	(19–13)	Kašpárek 6	Jane Sandanski Arena, Skopje; Attendance: 1,950; Referees: Brkic, Jusufhodzic (AUT)
22 September 2021; 20:45	2× (yellow card) 7× (suspension)	Report	3× (yellow card) 5× (suspension)	Jane Sandanski Arena, Skopje; Attendance: 1,950; Referees: Brkic, Jusufhodzic (AUT)

22 September 2021; 20:45	THW Kiel (Germany)	41–36	(Norway) Elverum Håndball	Sparkassen-Arena, Kiel; Attendance: 4,622; Referees: Pichon, Reveret (FRA)
22 September 2021; 20:45	Reinkind 7	(20–20)	Johansson 7	Sparkassen-Arena, Kiel; Attendance: 4,622; Referees: Pichon, Reveret (FRA)
22 September 2021; 20:45	2× (yellow card) 1× (suspension)	Report	2× (yellow card) 4× (suspension)	Sparkassen-Arena, Kiel; Attendance: 4,622; Referees: Pichon, Reveret (FRA)

29 September 2021; 18:45	RK Vardar (North Macedonia)	30–28	(Denmark) Aalborg Håndbold	Jane Sandanski Arena, Skopje; Attendance: 2,000; Referees: Nikolić, Stojković (SRB)
29 September 2021; 18:45	Nyokas 7	(16–16)	three players 5	Jane Sandanski Arena, Skopje; Attendance: 2,000; Referees: Nikolić, Stojković (SRB)
29 September 2021; 18:45	2× (yellow card) 3× (suspension)	Report	2× (yellow card) 1× (suspension)	Jane Sandanski Arena, Skopje; Attendance: 2,000; Referees: Nikolić, Stojković (SRB)

29 September 2021; 20:45	PPD Zagreb (Croatia)	27–27	(Norway) Elverum Håndball	Arena Zagreb, Zagreb; Attendance: 500; Referees: Lah, Sok (SLO)
29 September 2021; 20:45	Čupić 7	(14–11)	three players 5	Arena Zagreb, Zagreb; Attendance: 500; Referees: Lah, Sok (SLO)
29 September 2021; 20:45	2× (yellow card) 3× (suspension)	Report	2× (yellow card) 5× (suspension)	Arena Zagreb, Zagreb; Attendance: 500; Referees: Lah, Sok (SLO)

30 September 2021; 18:45	Meshkov Brest (Belarus)	25–28	(Hungary) Pick Szeged	Universal Sports Complex Victoria, Brest; Attendance: 1,350; Referees: Pavićević, Ražnatović (MNE)
30 September 2021; 18:45	Skube, Vranješ 4	(12–16)	Garciandia 7	Universal Sports Complex Victoria, Brest; Attendance: 1,350; Referees: Pavićević, Ražnatović (MNE)
30 September 2021; 18:45	1× (yellow card) 3× (suspension)	Report	1× (yellow card) 2× (suspension)	Universal Sports Complex Victoria, Brest; Attendance: 1,350; Referees: Pavićević, Ražnatović (MNE)

30 September 2021; 20:45	Montpellier Handball (France)	37–30	(Germany) THW Kiel	Sud de France Arena, Montpellier; Attendance: 4,000; Referees: Stark, Ştefan (ROU)
30 September 2021; 20:45	Villeminot 8	(18–14)	Ekberg 9	Sud de France Arena, Montpellier; Attendance: 4,000; Referees: Stark, Ştefan (ROU)
30 September 2021; 20:45	2× (yellow card) 2× (suspension)	Report	1× (yellow card) 3× (suspension)	Sud de France Arena, Montpellier; Attendance: 4,000; Referees: Stark, Ştefan (ROU)

13 October 2021; 18:45	THW Kiel (Germany)	36–28	(Croatia) PPD Zagreb	Sparkassen-Arena, Kiel; Attendance: 5,413; Referees: Andorka, Hucker (HUN)
13 October 2021; 18:45	Reinkind 8	(18–15)	Čupić, Vistorop 6	Sparkassen-Arena, Kiel; Attendance: 5,413; Referees: Andorka, Hucker (HUN)
13 October 2021; 18:45	1× (yellow card) 4× (suspension)	Report	3× (yellow card) 3× (suspension)	Sparkassen-Arena, Kiel; Attendance: 5,413; Referees: Andorka, Hucker (HUN)

13 October 2021; 18:45	Aalborg Håndbold (Denmark)	34–33	(Belarus) Meshkov Brest	Gigantium, Aalborg; Attendance: 4,144; Referees: Kurtagic, Wetterwik (SWE)
13 October 2021; 18:45	Claar 8	(18–18)	Bonnefond 8	Gigantium, Aalborg; Attendance: 4,144; Referees: Kurtagic, Wetterwik (SWE)
13 October 2021; 18:45	3× (suspension)	Report	4× (suspension)	Gigantium, Aalborg; Attendance: 4,144; Referees: Kurtagic, Wetterwik (SWE)

13 October 2021; 20:45	RK Vardar (North Macedonia)	25–31	(France) Montpellier Handball	Jane Sandanski Arena, Skopje; Attendance: 3,200; Referees: Marín, García (ESP)
13 October 2021; 20:45	Dibirov 7	(11–15)	Bos, Villeminot 7	Jane Sandanski Arena, Skopje; Attendance: 3,200; Referees: Marín, García (ESP)
13 October 2021; 20:45	1× (yellow card) 2× (suspension)	Report	2× (yellow card) 4× (suspension)	Jane Sandanski Arena, Skopje; Attendance: 3,200; Referees: Marín, García (ESP)

14 October 2021; 18:45	Pick Szeged (Hungary)	30–34	(Norway) Elverum Håndball	Újszegedi Sportcsarnok, Szeged; Attendance: 2,800; Referees: Nikolić, Stojković (SRB)
14 October 2021; 18:45	Bánhidi 6	(15–19)	Grøndahl 9	Újszegedi Sportcsarnok, Szeged; Attendance: 2,800; Referees: Nikolić, Stojković (SRB)
14 October 2021; 18:45	1× (yellow card) 3× (suspension)	Report	2× (yellow card) 2× (suspension) 1× (red card)	Újszegedi Sportcsarnok, Szeged; Attendance: 2,800; Referees: Nikolić, Stojković (SRB)

20 October 2021; 18:45	THW Kiel (Germany)	32–32	(Hungary) Pick Szeged	Sparkassen-Arena, Kiel; Attendance: 5,824; Referees: Mandák, Rudinský (SVK)
20 October 2021; 18:45	Pekeler 8	(17–14)	Šoštarič 5	Sparkassen-Arena, Kiel; Attendance: 5,824; Referees: Mandák, Rudinský (SVK)
20 October 2021; 18:45	1× (yellow card) 4× (suspension)	Report	1× (yellow card) 3× (suspension)	Sparkassen-Arena, Kiel; Attendance: 5,824; Referees: Mandák, Rudinský (SVK)

20 October 2021; 18:45	Aalborg Håndbold (Denmark)	33–29	(North Macedonia) RK Vardar	Gigantium, Aalborg; Attendance: 4,755; Referees: Bíró, Kiss (HUN)
20 October 2021; 18:45	Pálmarsson 8	(16–13)	Dibirov 9	Gigantium, Aalborg; Attendance: 4,755; Referees: Bíró, Kiss (HUN)
20 October 2021; 18:45	5× (suspension)	Report	1× (yellow card) 5× (suspension)	Gigantium, Aalborg; Attendance: 4,755; Referees: Bíró, Kiss (HUN)

20 October 2021; 18:45	Elverum Håndball (Norway)	30–25	(Croatia) PPD Zagreb	Terningen Arena, Elverum; Attendance: 2,000; Referees: Stark, Ştefan (ROU)
20 October 2021; 18:45	three players 5	(17–14)	Ćavar 6	Terningen Arena, Elverum; Attendance: 2,000; Referees: Stark, Ştefan (ROU)
20 October 2021; 18:45	2× (suspension)	Report	5× (suspension)	Terningen Arena, Elverum; Attendance: 2,000; Referees: Stark, Ştefan (ROU)

20 October 2021; 20:45	Montpellier Handball (France)	32–26	(Belarus) Meshkov Brest	Sud de France Arena, Montpellier; Attendance: 4,000; Referees: Mažeika, Gatelis (LTU)
20 October 2021; 20:45	Bos 11	(14–12)	Bonnefond 5	Sud de France Arena, Montpellier; Attendance: 4,000; Referees: Mažeika, Gatelis (LTU)
20 October 2021; 20:45	1× (yellow card) 4× (suspension)	Report	1× (yellow card) 2× (suspension)	Sud de France Arena, Montpellier; Attendance: 4,000; Referees: Mažeika, Gatelis (LTU)

27 October 2021; 18:45	Pick Szeged (Hungary)	31–28	(Denmark) Aalborg Håndbold	Újszegedi Sportcsarnok, Szeged; Attendance: 3,000; Referees: Lah, Sok (SLO)
27 October 2021; 18:45	three players 5	(17–13)	Barthold 8	Újszegedi Sportcsarnok, Szeged; Attendance: 3,000; Referees: Lah, Sok (SLO)
27 October 2021; 18:45	2× (yellow card) 5× (suspension) 1× (red card)	Report	2× (yellow card) 4× (suspension)	Újszegedi Sportcsarnok, Szeged; Attendance: 3,000; Referees: Lah, Sok (SLO)

27 October 2021; 20:45	RK Vardar (North Macedonia)	26–29	(Germany) THW Kiel	Jane Sandanski Arena, Skopje; Attendance: 3,000; Referees: Brunner, Salah (SUI)
27 October 2021; 20:45	Dibirov 10	(13–10)	Duvnjak 7	Jane Sandanski Arena, Skopje; Attendance: 3,000; Referees: Brunner, Salah (SUI)
27 October 2021; 20:45	4× (suspension)	Report	1× (yellow card) 4× (suspension)	Jane Sandanski Arena, Skopje; Attendance: 3,000; Referees: Brunner, Salah (SUI)

27 October 2021; 20:45	PPD Zagreb (Croatia)	22–25	(France) Montpellier Handball	Arena Zagreb, Zagreb; Attendance: 350; Referees: Horáček, Novotný (CZE)
27 October 2021; 20:45	Čupić 7	(13–12)	Bos 7	Arena Zagreb, Zagreb; Attendance: 350; Referees: Horáček, Novotný (CZE)
27 October 2021; 20:45	1× (yellow card) 2× (suspension)	Report	1× (yellow card) 3× (suspension)	Arena Zagreb, Zagreb; Attendance: 350; Referees: Horáček, Novotný (CZE)

28 October 2021; 18:45	Meshkov Brest (Belarus)	27–30	(Norway) Elverum Håndball	Universal Sports Complex Victoria, Brest; Attendance: 920; Referees: Horváth, Marton (HUN)
28 October 2021; 18:45	Vranješ 7	(11–14)	Grøndahl 9	Universal Sports Complex Victoria, Brest; Attendance: 920; Referees: Horváth, Marton (HUN)
28 October 2021; 18:45	2× (yellow card) 6× (suspension)	Report	2× (yellow card) 4× (suspension)	Universal Sports Complex Victoria, Brest; Attendance: 920; Referees: Horváth, Marton (HUN)

17 November 2021; 18:45	Meshkov Brest (Belarus)	30–30	(Croatia) PPD Zagreb	Universal Sports Complex Victoria, Brest; Attendance: 1,220; Referees: Baďura, Ondogrecula (SVK)
17 November 2021; 18:45	Kašpárek 6	(13–15)	Čupić 7	Universal Sports Complex Victoria, Brest; Attendance: 1,220; Referees: Baďura, Ondogrecula (SVK)
17 November 2021; 18:45	2× (yellow card) 3× (suspension)	Report	1× (yellow card) 2× (suspension)	Universal Sports Complex Victoria, Brest; Attendance: 1,220; Referees: Baďura, Ondogrecula (SVK)

17 November 2021; 18:45	Elverum Håndball (Norway)	30–37	(France) Montpellier Handball	Terningen Arena, Elverum; Attendance: 2,430; Referees: Schulze, Tönnies (GER)
17 November 2021; 18:45	Máthé 7	(15–20)	Descat 9	Terningen Arena, Elverum; Attendance: 2,430; Referees: Schulze, Tönnies (GER)
17 November 2021; 18:45	1× (yellow card) 5× (suspension)	Report	3× (suspension)	Terningen Arena, Elverum; Attendance: 2,430; Referees: Schulze, Tönnies (GER)

18 November 2021; 18:45	THW Kiel (Germany)	31–28	(Denmark) Aalborg Håndbold	Sparkassen-Arena, Kiel; Attendance: 6,233; Referees: Gubica, Milošević (CRO)
18 November 2021; 18:45	Ekberg, Pekeler 7	(17–14)	Juul 8	Sparkassen-Arena, Kiel; Attendance: 6,233; Referees: Gubica, Milošević (CRO)
18 November 2021; 18:45	6× (suspension)	Report	6× (suspension)	Sparkassen-Arena, Kiel; Attendance: 6,233; Referees: Gubica, Milošević (CRO)

18 November 2021; 18:45	Pick Szeged (Hungary)	34–31	(North Macedonia) RK Vardar	Újszegedi Sportcsarnok, Szeged; Attendance: 3,000; Referees: Elíasson, Pálsson (ISL)
18 November 2021; 18:45	Frimmel 9	(17–15)	Dibirov 7	Újszegedi Sportcsarnok, Szeged; Attendance: 3,000; Referees: Elíasson, Pálsson (ISL)
18 November 2021; 18:45	4× (suspension)	Report	1× (yellow card) 4× (suspension)	Újszegedi Sportcsarnok, Szeged; Attendance: 3,000; Referees: Elíasson, Pálsson (ISL)

24 November 2021; 18:45	Aalborg Håndbold (Denmark)	35–33	(Germany) THW Kiel	Gigantium, Aalborg; Attendance: 5,020; Referees: Elíasson, Pálsson (ISL)
24 November 2021; 18:45	Læsø 9	(17–16)	Ekberg 7	Gigantium, Aalborg; Attendance: 5,020; Referees: Elíasson, Pálsson (ISL)
24 November 2021; 18:45	1× (yellow card) 4× (suspension)	Report	2× (yellow card) 3× (suspension)	Gigantium, Aalborg; Attendance: 5,020; Referees: Elíasson, Pálsson (ISL)

24 November 2021; 20:45	PPD Zagreb (Croatia)	31–24	(Belarus) Meshkov Brest	Arena Zagreb, Zagreb; Attendance: 340; Referees: Santos, Fonseca (POR)
24 November 2021; 20:45	Čupić 8	(14–14)	Malus 6	Arena Zagreb, Zagreb; Attendance: 340; Referees: Santos, Fonseca (POR)
24 November 2021; 20:45	1× (yellow card) 2× (suspension)	Report	1× (yellow card) 4× (suspension) 1× (red card)	Arena Zagreb, Zagreb; Attendance: 340; Referees: Santos, Fonseca (POR)

24 November 2021; 20:45	Montpellier Handball (France)	39–32	(Norway) Elverum Håndball	Sud de France Arena, Montpellier; Attendance: 2,900; Referees: Bíró, Kiss (HUN)
24 November 2021; 20:45	Descat 11	(19–16)	Grøndahl 8	Sud de France Arena, Montpellier; Attendance: 2,900; Referees: Bíró, Kiss (HUN)
24 November 2021; 20:45	2× (suspension)	Report	1× (suspension)	Sud de France Arena, Montpellier; Attendance: 2,900; Referees: Bíró, Kiss (HUN)

25 November 2021; 20:45	RK Vardar (North Macedonia)	27–30	(Hungary) Pick Szeged	Jane Sandanski Arena, Skopje; Attendance: 2,500; Referees: Stark, Ştefan (ROU)
25 November 2021; 20:45	Dibirov, Gadža 5	(9–16)	Šoštarić 7	Jane Sandanski Arena, Skopje; Attendance: 2,500; Referees: Stark, Ştefan (ROU)
25 November 2021; 20:45	1× (yellow card) 5× (suspension)	Report	3× (suspension)	Jane Sandanski Arena, Skopje; Attendance: 2,500; Referees: Stark, Ştefan (ROU)

1 December 2021; 18:45	Elverum Håndball (Norway)	32–33	(Belarus) Meshkov Brest	Terningen Arena, Elverum; Attendance: 1,604; Referees: Brunner, Salah (SUI)
1 December 2021; 18:45	Grøndahl 8	(15–17)	Vailupau 8	Terningen Arena, Elverum; Attendance: 1,604; Referees: Brunner, Salah (SUI)
1 December 2021; 18:45	1× (yellow card) 4× (suspension)	Report	7× (suspension) 1× (red card)	Terningen Arena, Elverum; Attendance: 1,604; Referees: Brunner, Salah (SUI)

1 December 2021; 20:45	Aalborg Håndbold (Denmark)	34–30	(Hungary) Pick Szeged	Gigantium, Aalborg; Attendance: 450; Referees: Santos, Fonseca (POR)
1 December 2021; 20:45	Læsø 9	(16–14)	Šoštarič 7	Gigantium, Aalborg; Attendance: 450; Referees: Santos, Fonseca (POR)
1 December 2021; 20:45	1× (yellow card) 4× (suspension)	Report	1× (yellow card) 4× (suspension)	Gigantium, Aalborg; Attendance: 450; Referees: Santos, Fonseca (POR)

1 December 2021; 20:45	Montpellier Handball (France)	24–23	(Croatia) PPD Zagreb	Sud de France Arena, Montpellier; Attendance: 2,800; Referees: Pavićević, Ražnatović (MNE)
1 December 2021; 20:45	Wallinius 5	(14–12)	Čupić 5	Sud de France Arena, Montpellier; Attendance: 2,800; Referees: Pavićević, Ražnatović (MNE)
1 December 2021; 20:45	1× (yellow card) 5× (suspension)	Report	1× (yellow card) 5× (suspension)	Sud de France Arena, Montpellier; Attendance: 2,800; Referees: Pavićević, Ražnatović (MNE)

2 December 2021; 20:45	THW Kiel (Germany)	32–30	(North Macedonia) RK Vardar	Sparkassen-Arena, Kiel; Attendance: 4,711; Referees: Martins, Martins (POR)
2 December 2021; 20:45	Sagosen 8	(18–16)	Kuduz 9	Sparkassen-Arena, Kiel; Attendance: 4,711; Referees: Martins, Martins (POR)
2 December 2021; 20:45	1× (suspension)	Report	3× (suspension)	Sparkassen-Arena, Kiel; Attendance: 4,711; Referees: Martins, Martins (POR)

8 December 2021; 18:45	Elverum Håndball (Norway)	28–34	(Denmark) Aalborg Håndbold	Terningen Arena, Elverum; Attendance: 1,513; Referees: Marín, García (ESP)
8 December 2021; 18:45	Máthé 7	(12–16)	Bjørnsen, Claar 6	Terningen Arena, Elverum; Attendance: 1,513; Referees: Marín, García (ESP)
8 December 2021; 18:45	2× (yellow card) 5× (suspension)	Report	2× (suspension)	Terningen Arena, Elverum; Attendance: 1,513; Referees: Marín, García (ESP)

8 December 2021; 18:45	Meshkov Brest (Belarus)	31–31	(France) Montpellier Handball	Universal Sports Complex Victoria, Brest; Attendance: 1,120; Referees: Nikolić, Stojković (SRB)
8 December 2021; 18:45	Vailupau 9	(17–18)	Pellas 13	Universal Sports Complex Victoria, Brest; Attendance: 1,120; Referees: Nikolić, Stojković (SRB)
8 December 2021; 18:45	2× (yellow card) 5× (suspension)	Report	3× (yellow card) 5× (suspension)	Universal Sports Complex Victoria, Brest; Attendance: 1,120; Referees: Nikolić, Stojković (SRB)

8 December 2021; 20:45	PPD Zagreb (Croatia)	23–22	(North Macedonia) RK Vardar	Arena Zagreb, Zagreb; Attendance: 350; Referees: Mažeika, Gatelis (LTU)
8 December 2021; 20:45	Čupić 5	(14–12)	Dibirov, Toto 4	Arena Zagreb, Zagreb; Attendance: 350; Referees: Mažeika, Gatelis (LTU)
8 December 2021; 20:45	4× (yellow card) 3× (suspension)	Report	2× (yellow card) 4× (suspension) 1× (red card)	Arena Zagreb, Zagreb; Attendance: 350; Referees: Mažeika, Gatelis (LTU)

9 December 2021; 20:45	Pick Szeged (Hungary)	30–26	(Germany) THW Kiel	Pick Aréna, Szeged; Attendance: 8,300; Referees: Nikolov, Nachevski (MKD)
9 December 2021; 20:45	Bánhidi 6	(19–13)	Ekberg, Reinkind 5	Pick Aréna, Szeged; Attendance: 8,300; Referees: Nikolov, Nachevski (MKD)
9 December 2021; 20:45	1× (yellow card) 3× (suspension)	Report	1× (yellow card) 3× (suspension)	Pick Aréna, Szeged; Attendance: 8,300; Referees: Nikolov, Nachevski (MKD)

16 February 2022; 18:45	Meshkov Brest (Belarus)	30–33	(Denmark) Aalborg Håndbold	Universal Sports Complex Victoria, Brest; Attendance: 1,150; Referees: Brkic, Jusufhodzic (AUT)
16 February 2022; 18:45	Skube 8	(15–17)	Claar 7	Universal Sports Complex Victoria, Brest; Attendance: 1,150; Referees: Brkic, Jusufhodzic (AUT)
16 February 2022; 18:45	1× (yellow card) 4× (suspension)	Report	1× (yellow card) 5× (suspension)	Universal Sports Complex Victoria, Brest; Attendance: 1,150; Referees: Brkic, Jusufhodzic (AUT)

16 February 2022; 18:45	Montpellier Handball (France)	25–28	(North Macedonia) RK Vardar	FDI Stadium, Montpellier; Attendance: 2,800; Referees: Kurtagic, Wetterwik (SWE)
16 February 2022; 18:45	Descat 7	(10–14)	Nyokas 5	FDI Stadium, Montpellier; Attendance: 2,800; Referees: Kurtagic, Wetterwik (SWE)
16 February 2022; 18:45	1× (yellow card) 2× (suspension)	Report	1× (yellow card) 2× (suspension) 1× (red card)	FDI Stadium, Montpellier; Attendance: 2,800; Referees: Kurtagic, Wetterwik (SWE)

17 February 2022; 18:45	Elverum Håndball (Norway)	30–31	(Germany) THW Kiel	Terningen Arena, Elverum; Attendance: 8,532; Referees: Santos, Fonseca (POR)
17 February 2022; 18:45	Johansson 8	(15–14)	Sagosen 6	Terningen Arena, Elverum; Attendance: 8,532; Referees: Santos, Fonseca (POR)
17 February 2022; 18:45	1× (yellow card) 4× (suspension)	Report	7× (suspension)	Terningen Arena, Elverum; Attendance: 8,532; Referees: Santos, Fonseca (POR)

17 February 2022; 20:45	PPD Zagreb (Croatia)	26–24	(Hungary) Pick Szeged	Arena Zagreb, Zagreb; Attendance: 425; Referees: Erdoğan, Özdeniz (TUR)
17 February 2022; 20:45	Obranović 7	(14–10)	Martins 5	Arena Zagreb, Zagreb; Attendance: 425; Referees: Erdoğan, Özdeniz (TUR)
17 February 2022; 20:45	1× (yellow card) 2× (suspension)	Report	1× (yellow card) 1× (suspension)	Arena Zagreb, Zagreb; Attendance: 425; Referees: Erdoğan, Özdeniz (TUR)

23 February 2022; 18:45	Aalborg Håndbold (Denmark)	32–27	(Norway) Elverum Håndball	Gigantium, Aalborg; Attendance: 4,384; Referees: Mažeika, Gatelis (LTU)
23 February 2022; 18:45	Claar 6	(14–13)	Heldal 8	Gigantium, Aalborg; Attendance: 4,384; Referees: Mažeika, Gatelis (LTU)
23 February 2022; 18:45	1× (yellow card) 2× (suspension)	Report	4× (suspension)	Gigantium, Aalborg; Attendance: 4,384; Referees: Mažeika, Gatelis (LTU)

23 February 2022; 20:45	THW Kiel (Germany)	35–26	(France) Montpellier Handball	Sparkassen-Arena, Kiel; Attendance: 3,435; Referees: Lah, Sok (SLO)
23 February 2022; 20:45	Weinhold 5	(19–13)	Descat 6	Sparkassen-Arena, Kiel; Attendance: 3,435; Referees: Lah, Sok (SLO)
23 February 2022; 20:45	3× (suspension)	Report	1× (yellow card) 1× (suspension)	Sparkassen-Arena, Kiel; Attendance: 3,435; Referees: Lah, Sok (SLO)

23 February 2022; 20:45	RK Vardar (North Macedonia)	20–19	(Croatia) PPD Zagreb	Jane Sandanski Arena, Skopje; Attendance: 2,200; Referees: Horáček, Novotný (CZE)
23 February 2022; 20:45	Nyokas, Taleski 4	(11–9)	Leimeter 4	Jane Sandanski Arena, Skopje; Attendance: 2,200; Referees: Horáček, Novotný (CZE)
23 February 2022; 20:45	4× (suspension)	Report	1× (yellow card) 3× (suspension)	Jane Sandanski Arena, Skopje; Attendance: 2,200; Referees: Horáček, Novotný (CZE)

24 February 2022; 20:45	Pick Szeged (Hungary)	28–26	(Belarus) Meshkov Brest	Pick Aréna, Szeged; Attendance: 3,400; Referees: Marín, García (ESP)
24 February 2022; 20:45	Bánhidi 8	(16–14)	Sretenović 7	Pick Aréna, Szeged; Attendance: 3,400; Referees: Marín, García (ESP)
24 February 2022; 20:45	5× (suspension)	Report	2× (yellow card) 2× (suspension)	Pick Aréna, Szeged; Attendance: 3,400; Referees: Marín, García (ESP)

2 March 2022; 18:45	Elverum Håndball (Norway)	24–27	(Hungary) Pick Szeged	Terningen Arena, Elverum; Attendance: 1,655; Referees: Kurtagic, Wetterwik (SWE)
2 March 2022; 18:45	Heldal 7	(12–13)	Frimmel 7	Terningen Arena, Elverum; Attendance: 1,655; Referees: Kurtagic, Wetterwik (SWE)
2 March 2022; 18:45	1× (yellow card) 3× (suspension)	Report	5× (suspension)	Terningen Arena, Elverum; Attendance: 1,655; Referees: Kurtagic, Wetterwik (SWE)

{{{date}}} 20:45	Montpellier Handball (France)	31–33	(Denmark) Aalborg Håndbold	Sud de France Arena, Montpellier; Attendance: 3,000; Referees: Brunner, Salah (SUI)
{{{date}}} 20:45	Descat 8	(14–20)	Claar 10	Sud de France Arena, Montpellier; Attendance: 3,000; Referees: Brunner, Salah (SUI)
{{{date}}} 20:45	1× (yellow card) 2× (suspension)	Report	1× (suspension)	Sud de France Arena, Montpellier; Attendance: 3,000; Referees: Brunner, Salah (SUI)

3 March 2022; 20:45	PPD Zagreb (Croatia)	27–28	(Germany) THW Kiel	Arena Zagreb, Zagreb; Attendance: 1,721; Referees: Brkic, Jusufhodzic (AUT)
3 March 2022; 20:45	Mandić 9	(15–12)	Duvnjak, Reinkind 5	Arena Zagreb, Zagreb; Attendance: 1,721; Referees: Brkic, Jusufhodzic (AUT)
3 March 2022; 20:45	2× (yellow card) 5× (suspension)	Report	3× (yellow card) 4× (suspension)	Arena Zagreb, Zagreb; Attendance: 1,721; Referees: Brkic, Jusufhodzic (AUT)

9 March 2022; 18:45	Aalborg Håndbold (Denmark)	31–25	(Croatia) PPD Zagreb	Gigantium, Aalborg; Attendance: 4,877; Referees: Gasmi, Gasmi (FRA)
9 March 2022; 18:45	Claar 6	(16–13)	Čupić 11	Gigantium, Aalborg; Attendance: 4,877; Referees: Gasmi, Gasmi (FRA)
9 March 2022; 18:45	2× (suspension)	Report	4× (suspension)	Gigantium, Aalborg; Attendance: 4,877; Referees: Gasmi, Gasmi (FRA)

9 March 2022; 20:45	RK Vardar (North Macedonia)	39–30	(Norway) Elverum Håndball	Jane Sandanski Arena, Skopje; Attendance: 2,200; Referees: Baumgart, Wild (GER)
9 March 2022; 20:45	Dibirov 7	(17–16)	Johansson 8	Jane Sandanski Arena, Skopje; Attendance: 2,200; Referees: Baumgart, Wild (GER)
9 March 2022; 20:45	5× (suspension)	Report	1× (yellow card) 3× (suspension)	Jane Sandanski Arena, Skopje; Attendance: 2,200; Referees: Baumgart, Wild (GER)

10 March 2022; 18:45	Pick Szeged (Hungary)	29–29	(France) Montpellier Handball	Pick Aréna, Szeged; Attendance: 5,500; Referees: Gubica, Milošević (CRO)
10 March 2022; 18:45	Šoštarič 6	(17–16)	Pellas, Simonet 5	Pick Aréna, Szeged; Attendance: 5,500; Referees: Gubica, Milošević (CRO)
10 March 2022; 18:45	5× (suspension) 1× (red card)	Report	1× (yellow card) 5× (suspension)	Pick Aréna, Szeged; Attendance: 5,500; Referees: Gubica, Milošević (CRO)

Cancelled (Note: The matches were cancelled due to the Russian invasion of Ukraine.)	THW Kiel (Germany)	10–0	(Belarus) Meshkov Brest

Cancelled	Meshkov Brest (Belarus)	0–10	(North Macedonia) RK Vardar

=== Group B ===
Pos	Team	Pld	W	D	L	GF	GA	GD	Pts	Qualification
1	(Poland) Łomża Vive Kielce	14	10	0	4	449	415	+34	20 (Note: Kielce 61–57 Barça)	Quarterfinals
2	(Spain) Barça	14	9	2	3	420	369	+51	20	Quarterfinals
3	(France) Paris Saint-Germain	14	8	2	4	452	396	+56	18	Playoffs
4	(Hungary) Telekom Veszprém	14	8	1	5	449	423	+26	17	Playoffs
5	(Portugal) FC Porto	14	4	3	7	375	408	−33	11	Playoffs
6	(Germany) SG Flensburg-Handewitt	14	4	2	8	381	401	−20	10	Playoffs
7	(Romania) Dinamo București	14	4	0	10	415	470	−55	8 (Note: Dinamo 60–57 Motor)	
8	(Ukraine) Motor	14	4	0	10	312	371	−59	8	

Source: EHF
Rules for classification: Tiebreakers
Notes:

15 September 2021; 18:45	Telekom Veszprém (Hungary)	34–31	(France) Paris Saint-Germain	Veszprém Aréna, Veszprém; Attendance: 4,600; Referees: Gubica, Milošević (CRO)
15 September 2021; 18:45	Omar 10	(13–17)	Hansen 7	Veszprém Aréna, Veszprém; Attendance: 4,600; Referees: Gubica, Milošević (CRO)
15 September 2021; 18:45	1× (yellow card) 5× (suspension)	Report	3× (suspension)	Veszprém Aréna, Veszprém; Attendance: 4,600; Referees: Gubica, Milošević (CRO)

15 September 2021; 18:45	Dinamo București (Romania)	32–29	(Poland) Łomża Vive Kielce	Dinamo Polyvalent Hall, Bucharest; Attendance: 1,700; Referees: Hansen, Madsen (DEN)
15 September 2021; 18:45	Nantes 11	(16–12)	Moryto 7	Dinamo Polyvalent Hall, Bucharest; Attendance: 1,700; Referees: Hansen, Madsen (DEN)
15 September 2021; 18:45	5× (suspension) 1× (red card)	Report	4× (suspension)	Dinamo Polyvalent Hall, Bucharest; Attendance: 1,700; Referees: Hansen, Madsen (DEN)

15 September 2021; 18:45	Motor (Ukraine)	30–27	(Portugal) FC Porto	Yunist Palace of Sports, Zaporizhzhia; Attendance: 1,950; Referees: Pavićević, Ražnatović (MNE)
15 September 2021; 18:45	Bokhan 8	(15–10)	Areia 6	Yunist Palace of Sports, Zaporizhzhia; Attendance: 1,950; Referees: Pavićević, Ražnatović (MNE)
15 September 2021; 18:45	1× (yellow card) 1× (suspension)	Report	3× (yellow card) 2× (suspension)	Yunist Palace of Sports, Zaporizhzhia; Attendance: 1,950; Referees: Pavićević, Ražnatović (MNE)

15 September 2021; 20:45	SG Flensburg-Handewitt (Germany)	21–25	(Spain) Barça	Flens-Arena, Flensburg; Attendance: 2,066; Referees: Brunner, Salah (SUI)
15 September 2021; 20:45	Wanne 6	(10–13)	Mem 7	Flens-Arena, Flensburg; Attendance: 2,066; Referees: Brunner, Salah (SUI)
15 September 2021; 20:45	1× (yellow card) 1× (suspension)	Report	1× (yellow card) 3× (suspension)	Flens-Arena, Flensburg; Attendance: 2,066; Referees: Brunner, Salah (SUI)

23 September 2021; 18:45	Barça (Spain)	36–25	(Ukraine) Motor	Palau Blaugrana, Barcelona; Attendance: 487; Referees: Madsen, Mortensen (DEN)
23 September 2021; 18:45	Mem 8	(16–13)	Pukhouski 6	Palau Blaugrana, Barcelona; Attendance: 487; Referees: Madsen, Mortensen (DEN)
23 September 2021; 18:45	2× (suspension)	Report	1× (yellow card) 4× (suspension)	Palau Blaugrana, Barcelona; Attendance: 487; Referees: Madsen, Mortensen (DEN)

23 September 2021; 18:45	Łomża Vive Kielce (Poland)	32–29	(Hungary) Telekom Veszprém	Hala Legionów, Kielce; Attendance: 4,100; Referees: Kurtagic, Wetterwik (SWE)
23 September 2021; 18:45	A. Dujshebaev 7	(17–12)	Nenadić 10	Hala Legionów, Kielce; Attendance: 4,100; Referees: Kurtagic, Wetterwik (SWE)
23 September 2021; 18:45	2× (yellow card) 4× (suspension) 1× (red card)	Report	5× (suspension)	Hala Legionów, Kielce; Attendance: 4,100; Referees: Kurtagic, Wetterwik (SWE)

23 September 2021; 20:45	Paris Saint-Germain (France)	41–30	(Romania) Dinamo București	Stade Pierre de Coubertin, Paris; Attendance: 2,421; Referees: Bíró, Kiss (HUN)
23 September 2021; 20:45	Solé 6	(21–11)	Sorhaindo 9	Stade Pierre de Coubertin, Paris; Attendance: 2,421; Referees: Bíró, Kiss (HUN)
23 September 2021; 20:45	2× (suspension)	Report	1× (yellow card) 5× (suspension)	Stade Pierre de Coubertin, Paris; Attendance: 2,421; Referees: Bíró, Kiss (HUN)

23 September 2021; 20:45	FC Porto (Portugal)	28–27	(Germany) SG Flensburg-Handewitt	Dragão Arena, Porto; Attendance: 695; Referees: Nikolov, Nachevski (MKD)
23 September 2021; 20:45	Salina 6	(13–12)	Wanne 8	Dragão Arena, Porto; Attendance: 695; Referees: Nikolov, Nachevski (MKD)
23 September 2021; 20:45	1× (yellow card) 4× (suspension)	Report	1× (yellow card) 2× (suspension)	Dragão Arena, Porto; Attendance: 695; Referees: Nikolov, Nachevski (MKD)

29 September 2021; 18:45	Motor (Ukraine)	25–26	(Poland) Łomża Vive Kielce	Yunist Palace of Sports, Zaporizhzhia; Attendance: 1,900; Referees: Mažeika, Gatelis (LTU)
29 September 2021; 18:45	Malašinskas 9	(13–14)	four players 4	Yunist Palace of Sports, Zaporizhzhia; Attendance: 1,900; Referees: Mažeika, Gatelis (LTU)
29 September 2021; 18:45	7× (suspension) 2× (red card)	Report	1× (yellow card) 3× (suspension)	Yunist Palace of Sports, Zaporizhzhia; Attendance: 1,900; Referees: Mažeika, Gatelis (LTU)

29 September 2021; 18:45	Telekom Veszprém (Hungary)	29–28	(Spain) Barça	Veszprém Aréna, Veszprém; Attendance: 5,089; Referees: Horáček, Novotný (CZE)
29 September 2021; 18:45	Marguč 8	(16–12)	three players 5	Veszprém Aréna, Veszprém; Attendance: 5,089; Referees: Horáček, Novotný (CZE)
29 September 2021; 18:45	3× (yellow card) 6× (suspension)	Report	1× (yellow card) 3× (suspension)	Veszprém Aréna, Veszprém; Attendance: 5,089; Referees: Horáček, Novotný (CZE)

29 September 2021; 20:45	SG Flensburg-Handewitt (Germany)	27–27	(France) Paris Saint-Germain	Flens-Arena, Flensburg; Attendance: 2,400; Referees: Hansen, Madsen (DEN)
29 September 2021; 20:45	Wanne 7	(14–13)	Hansen 6	Flens-Arena, Flensburg; Attendance: 2,400; Referees: Hansen, Madsen (DEN)
29 September 2021; 20:45	2× (yellow card) 2× (suspension)	Report	3× (yellow card) 0× (suspension)	Flens-Arena, Flensburg; Attendance: 2,400; Referees: Hansen, Madsen (DEN)

30 September 2021; 18:45	Dinamo București (Romania)	26–27	(Portugal) FC Porto	Dinamo Polyvalent Hall, Bucharest; Attendance: 1,250; Referees: Brunner, Salah (SUI)
30 September 2021; 18:45	five players 3	(14–15)	Alves, Iturriza	Dinamo Polyvalent Hall, Bucharest; Attendance: 1,250; Referees: Brunner, Salah (SUI)
30 September 2021; 18:45	3× (suspension)	Report	4× (suspension) 1× (red card)	Dinamo Polyvalent Hall, Bucharest; Attendance: 1,250; Referees: Brunner, Salah (SUI)

13 October 2021; 20:45	Łomża Vive Kielce (Poland)	37–29	(Germany) SG Flensburg-Handewitt	Hala Legionów, Kielce; Attendance: 3,800; Referees: Lah, Sok (SLO)
13 October 2021; 20:45	Sićko 9	(21–16)	Mensing 9	Hala Legionów, Kielce; Attendance: 3,800; Referees: Lah, Sok (SLO)
13 October 2021; 20:45	3× (suspension)	Report	2× (yellow card) 3× (suspension)	Hala Legionów, Kielce; Attendance: 3,800; Referees: Lah, Sok (SLO)

14 October 2021; 20:45	Paris Saint-Germain (France)	40–32	(Ukraine) Motor	Stade Pierre de Coubertin, Paris; Attendance: 2,000; Referees: Pandžić, Mošorinski (SRB)
14 October 2021; 20:45	Hansen 6	(19–14)	Kozakevych 7	Stade Pierre de Coubertin, Paris; Attendance: 2,000; Referees: Pandžić, Mošorinski (SRB)
14 October 2021; 20:45	1× (yellow card) 4× (suspension)	Report	2× (yellow card) 5× (suspension)	Stade Pierre de Coubertin, Paris; Attendance: 2,000; Referees: Pandžić, Mošorinski (SRB)

14 October 2021; 20:45	Barça (Spain)	36–32	(Romania) Dinamo București	Palau Blaugrana, Barcelona; Attendance: 1,018; Referees: Bonaventura, Bonaventura (FRA)
14 October 2021; 20:45	Mem 12	(19–14)	Ghionea, Pascual Garcia 9	Palau Blaugrana, Barcelona; Attendance: 1,018; Referees: Bonaventura, Bonaventura (FRA)
14 October 2021; 20:45	2× (suspension)	Report	1× (yellow card) 4× (suspension)	Palau Blaugrana, Barcelona; Attendance: 1,018; Referees: Bonaventura, Bonaventura (FRA)

14 October 2021; 20:45	FC Porto (Portugal)	23–30	(Hungary) Telekom Veszprém	Dragão Arena, Porto; Attendance: 1,486; Referees: Baumgart, Wild (GER)
14 October 2021; 20:45	Silva 6	(10–16)	Nenadić 8	Dragão Arena, Porto; Attendance: 1,486; Referees: Baumgart, Wild (GER)
14 October 2021; 20:45	1× (yellow card) 1× (suspension)	Report	1× (yellow card) 2× (suspension)	Dragão Arena, Porto; Attendance: 1,486; Referees: Baumgart, Wild (GER)

20 October 2021; 18:45	Łomża Vive Kielce (Poland)	39–33	(Portugal) FC Porto	Hala Legionów, Kielce; Attendance: 4,100; Referees: Gubica, Milošević (CRO)
20 October 2021; 18:45	Guðjónsson 10	(21–17)	Slišković 7	Hala Legionów, Kielce; Attendance: 4,100; Referees: Gubica, Milošević (CRO)
20 October 2021; 18:45	4× (suspension)	Report	1× (yellow card) 8× (suspension) 1× (red card)	Hala Legionów, Kielce; Attendance: 4,100; Referees: Gubica, Milošević (CRO)

21 October 2021; 18:45	Telekom Veszprém (Hungary)	28–23	(Germany) SG Flensburg-Handewitt	Veszprém Aréna, Veszprém; Attendance: 5,000; Referees: Brkic, Jusufhodzic (AUT)
21 October 2021; 18:45	Štrlek 7	(14–8)	Einarsson 5	Veszprém Aréna, Veszprém; Attendance: 5,000; Referees: Brkic, Jusufhodzic (AUT)
21 October 2021; 18:45	1× (yellow card)	Report	1× (yellow card) 4× (suspension) 1× (red card)	Veszprém Aréna, Veszprém; Attendance: 5,000; Referees: Brkic, Jusufhodzic (AUT)

21 October 2021; 18:45	Motor (Ukraine)	28–27	(Romania) Dinamo București	Yunist Palace of Sports, Zaporizhzhia; Attendance: 500; Referees: Nikolov, Nachevski (MKD)
21 October 2021; 18:45	Denysov, Pukhouski 5	(13–13)	Ghionea 8	Yunist Palace of Sports, Zaporizhzhia; Attendance: 500; Referees: Nikolov, Nachevski (MKD)
21 October 2021; 18:45	1× (yellow card)	Report	2× (yellow card) 4× (suspension)	Yunist Palace of Sports, Zaporizhzhia; Attendance: 500; Referees: Nikolov, Nachevski (MKD)

21 October 2021; 20:45	Barça (Spain)	30–27	(France) Paris Saint-Germain	Palau Blaugrana, Barcelona; Attendance: 2,451; Referees: Schulze, Tönnies (GER)
21 October 2021; 20:45	Mem 7	(13–13)	Hansen 7	Palau Blaugrana, Barcelona; Attendance: 2,451; Referees: Schulze, Tönnies (GER)
21 October 2021; 20:45	1× (yellow card) 5× (suspension)	Report	1× (yellow card) 1× (suspension)	Palau Blaugrana, Barcelona; Attendance: 2,451; Referees: Schulze, Tönnies (GER)

27 October 2021; 18:45	Łomża Vive Kielce (Poland)	38–33	(France) Paris Saint-Germain	Hala Legionów, Kielce; Attendance: 4,000; Referees: Pavićević, Ražnatović (MNE)
27 October 2021; 18:45	Nahi, Sićko 6	(19–14)	Hansen 8	Hala Legionów, Kielce; Attendance: 4,000; Referees: Pavićević, Ražnatović (MNE)
27 October 2021; 18:45	6× (suspension)	Report	2× (yellow card) 5× (suspension)	Hala Legionów, Kielce; Attendance: 4,000; Referees: Pavićević, Ražnatović (MNE)

28 October 2021; 18:45	Dinamo București (Romania)	31–29	(Hungary) Telekom Veszprém	Dinamo Polyvalent Hall, Bucharest; Attendance: 100; Referees: Nikolić, Stojković (SRB)
28 October 2021; 18:45	Ghionea 8	(14–13)	Nenadić 9	Dinamo Polyvalent Hall, Bucharest; Attendance: 100; Referees: Nikolić, Stojković (SRB)
28 October 2021; 18:45	1× (yellow card) 7× (suspension) 1× (red card)	Report	3× (yellow card) 4× (suspension) 1× (red card)	Dinamo Polyvalent Hall, Bucharest; Attendance: 100; Referees: Nikolić, Stojković (SRB)

28 October 2021; 20:45	FC Porto (Portugal)	33–33	(Spain) Barça	Dragão Arena, Porto; Attendance: 1,792; Referees: Hansen, Madsen (DEN)
28 October 2021; 20:45	Slišković 7	(17–14)	Gómez 11	Dragão Arena, Porto; Attendance: 1,792; Referees: Hansen, Madsen (DEN)
28 October 2021; 20:45	5× (suspension)	Report	1× (suspension)	Dragão Arena, Porto; Attendance: 1,792; Referees: Hansen, Madsen (DEN)

28 October 2021; 20:45	SG Flensburg-Handewitt (Germany)	34–27	(Ukraine) Motor	Flens-Arena, Flensburg; Attendance: 1,234; Referees: Kurtagic, Wetterwik (SWE)
28 October 2021; 20:45	Wanne 8	(13–11)	Bokhan 7	Flens-Arena, Flensburg; Attendance: 1,234; Referees: Kurtagic, Wetterwik (SWE)
28 October 2021; 20:45	1× (yellow card) 5× (suspension)	Report	6× (suspension) 1× (red card)	Flens-Arena, Flensburg; Attendance: 1,234; Referees: Kurtagic, Wetterwik (SWE)

17 November 2021; 18:45	Motor (Ukraine)	29–27	(Hungary) Telekom Veszprém	Yunist Palace of Sports, Zaporizhzhia; Attendance: 1,100; Referees: Jurinović, Mrvica (CRO)
17 November 2021; 18:45	Denysov, Horiha 6	(14–12)	Mahé 6	Yunist Palace of Sports, Zaporizhzhia; Attendance: 1,100; Referees: Jurinović, Mrvica (CRO)
17 November 2021; 18:45	1× (yellow card) 3× (suspension)	Report	1× (yellow card) 4× (suspension)	Yunist Palace of Sports, Zaporizhzhia; Attendance: 1,100; Referees: Jurinović, Mrvica (CRO)

17 November 2021; 20:45	SG Flensburg-Handewitt (Germany)	37–30	(Romania) Dinamo București	Flens-Arena, Flensburg; Attendance: 1,277; Referees: Marín, García (ESP)
17 November 2021; 20:45	Wanne 8	(14–14)	Ghionea 8	Flens-Arena, Flensburg; Attendance: 1,277; Referees: Marín, García (ESP)
17 November 2021; 20:45	2× (yellow card) 3× (suspension)	Report	1× (yellow card) 1× (suspension)	Flens-Arena, Flensburg; Attendance: 1,277; Referees: Marín, García (ESP)

18 November 2021; 20:45	Paris Saint-Germain (France)	33–19	(Portugal) FC Porto	Stade Pierre de Coubertin, Paris; Attendance: 2,383; Referees: Mažeika, Gatelis (LTU)
18 November 2021; 20:45	Syprzak 8	(18–4)	Iturriza 5	Stade Pierre de Coubertin, Paris; Attendance: 2,383; Referees: Mažeika, Gatelis (LTU)
18 November 2021; 20:45	2× (suspension)	Report	3× (suspension)	Stade Pierre de Coubertin, Paris; Attendance: 2,383; Referees: Mažeika, Gatelis (LTU)

18 November 2021; 20:45	Barça (Spain)	30–32	(Poland) Łomża Vive Kielce	Palau Blaugrana, Barcelona; Attendance: 2,480; Referees: Nikolov, Nachevski (MKD)
18 November 2021; 20:45	Mem, N'Guessan 7	(16–19)	Moryto 7	Palau Blaugrana, Barcelona; Attendance: 2,480; Referees: Nikolov, Nachevski (MKD)
18 November 2021; 20:45	1× (yellow card) 1× (suspension)	Report	1× (yellow card) 2× (suspension)	Palau Blaugrana, Barcelona; Attendance: 2,480; Referees: Nikolov, Nachevski (MKD)

24 November 2021; 18:45	Łomża Vive Kielce (Poland)	29–27	(Spain) Barça	Hala Legionów, Kielce; Attendance: 4,200; Referees: Brkic, Jusufhodzic (AUT)
24 November 2021; 18:45	A. Dujshebaev 8	(14–16)	Ariño 5	Hala Legionów, Kielce; Attendance: 4,200; Referees: Brkic, Jusufhodzic (AUT)
24 November 2021; 18:45	1× (yellow card) 2× (suspension)	Report	2× (yellow card) 4× (suspension)	Hala Legionów, Kielce; Attendance: 4,200; Referees: Brkic, Jusufhodzic (AUT)

25 November 2021; 18:45	Telekom Veszprém (Hungary)	36–29	(Ukraine) Motor	Veszprém Aréna, Veszprém; Attendance: 4,000; Referees: Jørum, Kleven (NOR)
25 November 2021; 18:45	Marguč 9	(18–13)	Bokhan 8	Veszprém Aréna, Veszprém; Attendance: 4,000; Referees: Jørum, Kleven (NOR)
25 November 2021; 18:45	1× (yellow card) 3× (suspension)	Report	1× (yellow card) 5× (suspension)	Veszprém Aréna, Veszprém; Attendance: 4,000; Referees: Jørum, Kleven (NOR)

25 November 2021; 18:45	Dinamo București (Romania)	20–28	(Germany) SG Flensburg-Handewitt	Dinamo Polyvalent Hall, Bucharest; Attendance: 0 (Note: The match was played behind closed doors due to the COVID-19 pandemic.); Referees: Horáček, Novotný (CZE)
25 November 2021; 18:45	Shebib, Nantes 5	(13–13)	Mensing 8	Dinamo Polyvalent Hall, Bucharest; Attendance: 0 Referees: Horáček, Novotný (CZE)
25 November 2021; 18:45	1× (yellow card) 2× (suspension)	Report	1× (yellow card) 4× (suspension)	Dinamo Polyvalent Hall, Bucharest; Attendance: 0 Referees: Horáček, Novotný (CZE)

25 November 2021; 20:45	FC Porto (Portugal)	30–39	(France) Paris Saint-Germain	Dragão Arena, Porto; Attendance: 1,917; Referees: Mandák, Rudinský (SVK)
25 November 2021; 20:45	Cruz, Slišković 5	(15–23)	Syprzak 9	Dragão Arena, Porto; Attendance: 1,917; Referees: Mandák, Rudinský (SVK)
25 November 2021; 20:45	1× (yellow card) 5× (suspension)	Report	1× (yellow card) 3× (suspension)	Dragão Arena, Porto; Attendance: 1,917; Referees: Mandák, Rudinský (SVK)

1 December 2021; 18:45	Motor (Ukraine)	31–22	(Germany) SG Flensburg-Handewitt	Yunist Palace of Sports, Zaporizhzhia; Attendance: 1,100; Referees: Bíró, Kiss (HUN)
1 December 2021; 18:45	Malašinskas 9	(15–14)	Jakobsen 8	Yunist Palace of Sports, Zaporizhzhia; Attendance: 1,100; Referees: Bíró, Kiss (HUN)
1 December 2021; 18:45	3× (suspension)	Report	1× (yellow card) 1× (suspension)	Yunist Palace of Sports, Zaporizhzhia; Attendance: 1,100; Referees: Bíró, Kiss (HUN)

2 December 2021; 18:45	Telekom Veszprém (Hungary)	47–32	(Romania) Dinamo București	Veszprém Aréna, Veszprém; Attendance: 4,300; Referees: Hansen, Madsen (DEN)
2 December 2021; 18:45	Omar 8	(22–15)	Humet, Nantes 6	Veszprém Aréna, Veszprém; Attendance: 4,300; Referees: Hansen, Madsen (DEN)
2 December 2021; 18:45	1× (yellow card) 4× (suspension)	Report	2× (suspension)	Veszprém Aréna, Veszprém; Attendance: 4,300; Referees: Hansen, Madsen (DEN)

2 December 2021; 20:45	Barça (Spain)	38–31	(Portugal) FC Porto	Palau Blaugrana, Barcelona; Attendance: 1,140; Referees: Kurtagic, Wetterwik (SWE)
2 December 2021; 20:45	Gómez 12	(20–13)	Magalhães 9	Palau Blaugrana, Barcelona; Attendance: 1,140; Referees: Kurtagic, Wetterwik (SWE)
2 December 2021; 20:45	2× (suspension) 1× (red card)	Report	2× (suspension)	Palau Blaugrana, Barcelona; Attendance: 1,140; Referees: Kurtagic, Wetterwik (SWE)

2 December 2021; 20:45	Paris Saint-Germain (France)	32–27	(Poland) Łomża Vive Kielce	Stade Pierre de Coubertin, Paris; Attendance: 2,843; Referees: Horáček, Novotný (CZE)
2 December 2021; 20:45	Hansen 7	(16–14)	Nahi, Sićko 5	Stade Pierre de Coubertin, Paris; Attendance: 2,843; Referees: Horáček, Novotný (CZE)
2 December 2021; 20:45	1× (yellow card) 7× (suspension)	Report	6× (suspension) 1× (red card)	Stade Pierre de Coubertin, Paris; Attendance: 2,843; Referees: Horáček, Novotný (CZE)

9 December 2021; 18:45	Dinamo București (Romania)	33–29	(Ukraine) Motor	Dinamo Polyvalent Hall, Bucharest; Attendance: 2,000; Referees: Gubica, Milošević (CRO)
9 December 2021; 18:45	Nantes 13	(16–14)	Bokhan, Malašinskas 6	Dinamo Polyvalent Hall, Bucharest; Attendance: 2,000; Referees: Gubica, Milošević (CRO)
9 December 2021; 18:45	1× (yellow card) 5× (suspension)	Report	1× (yellow card) 5× (suspension)	Dinamo Polyvalent Hall, Bucharest; Attendance: 2,000; Referees: Gubica, Milošević (CRO)

9 December 2021; 18:45	SG Flensburg-Handewitt (Germany)	30–27	(Hungary) Telekom Veszprém	Flens-Arena, Flensburg; Attendance: 1,703; Referees: Mandák, Rudinský (SVK)
9 December 2021; 18:45	Mensah Larsen 7	(16–12)	Marguč 6	Flens-Arena, Flensburg; Attendance: 1,703; Referees: Mandák, Rudinský (SVK)
9 December 2021; 18:45	1× (yellow card) 3× (suspension)	Report	5× (suspension)	Flens-Arena, Flensburg; Attendance: 1,703; Referees: Mandák, Rudinský (SVK)

9 December 2021; 20:45	Paris Saint-Germain (France)	28–28	(Spain) Barça	Stade Pierre de Coubertin, Paris; Attendance: 2,795; Referees: Lah, Sok (SLO)
9 December 2021; 20:45	Solé 8	(17–15)	Langaro 7	Stade Pierre de Coubertin, Paris; Attendance: 2,795; Referees: Lah, Sok (SLO)
9 December 2021; 20:45	3× (suspension)	Report	1× (yellow card) 3× (suspension) 1× (red card)	Stade Pierre de Coubertin, Paris; Attendance: 2,795; Referees: Lah, Sok (SLO)

9 December 2021; 20:45	FC Porto (Portugal)	29–27	(Poland) Łomża Vive Kielce	Dragão Arena, Porto; Attendance: 608; Referees: Madsen, Mortensen (DEN)
9 December 2021; 20:45	Cruz 7	(14–14)	Karalek 7	Dragão Arena, Porto; Attendance: 608; Referees: Madsen, Mortensen (DEN)
9 December 2021; 20:45	1× (yellow card) 2× (suspension)	Report	2× (suspension)	Dragão Arena, Porto; Attendance: 608; Referees: Madsen, Mortensen (DEN)

16 February 2022; 18:45	Telekom Veszprém (Hungary)	28–28	(Portugal) FC Porto	Veszprém Aréna, Veszprém; Attendance: 4,800; Referees: Nikolić, Stojković (SRB)
16 February 2022; 18:45	Mahé, Nenadić 6	(15–15)	three players 4	Veszprém Aréna, Veszprém; Attendance: 4,800; Referees: Nikolić, Stojković (SRB)
16 February 2022; 18:45	2× (yellow card) 3× (suspension)	Report	3× (yellow card) 4× (suspension)	Veszprém Aréna, Veszprém; Attendance: 4,800; Referees: Nikolić, Stojković (SRB)

16 February 2022; 20:45	SG Flensburg-Handewitt (Germany)	25–33	(Poland) Łomża Vive Kielce	Flens-Arena, Flensburg; Attendance: 1,075; Referees: Elíasson, Pálsson (ISL)
16 February 2022; 20:45	Jakobsen 6	(12–14)	Karačić 6	Flens-Arena, Flensburg; Attendance: 1,075; Referees: Elíasson, Pálsson (ISL)
16 February 2022; 20:45	1× (yellow card) 3× (suspension)	Report	1× (yellow card) 2× (suspension)	Flens-Arena, Flensburg; Attendance: 1,075; Referees: Elíasson, Pálsson (ISL)

17 February 2022; 18:45	Dinamo București (Romania)	30–35	(Spain) Barça	Dinamo Polyvalent Hall, Bucharest; Attendance: 1,650; Referees: Pavićević, Ražnatović (MNE)
17 February 2022; 18:45	Shebib 9	(15–17)	Mem 9	Dinamo Polyvalent Hall, Bucharest; Attendance: 1,650; Referees: Pavićević, Ražnatović (MNE)
17 February 2022; 18:45	4× (suspension)	Report		Dinamo Polyvalent Hall, Bucharest; Attendance: 1,650; Referees: Pavićević, Ražnatović (MNE)

23 February 2022; 18:45	Łomża Vive Kielce (Poland)	33–27	(Ukraine) Motor	Hala Legionów, Kielce; Attendance: 4,200; Referees: Hansen, Madsen (DEN)
23 February 2022; 18:45	Tournat 8	(19–13)	Horiha 5	Hala Legionów, Kielce; Attendance: 4,200; Referees: Hansen, Madsen (DEN)
23 February 2022; 18:45	2× (suspension)	Report	4× (suspension)	Hala Legionów, Kielce; Attendance: 4,200; Referees: Hansen, Madsen (DEN)

24 February 2022; 18:45	Barça (Spain)	35–30	(Hungary) Telekom Veszprém	Palau Blaugrana, Barcelona; Attendance: 2,579; Referees: Gubica, Milošević (CRO)
24 February 2022; 18:45	Mem 8	(13–13)	Omar 7	Palau Blaugrana, Barcelona; Attendance: 2,579; Referees: Gubica, Milošević (CRO)
24 February 2022; 18:45	5× (suspension)	Report	6× (suspension)	Palau Blaugrana, Barcelona; Attendance: 2,579; Referees: Gubica, Milošević (CRO)

24 February 2022; 20:45	Paris Saint-Germain (France)	33–30	(Germany) SG Flensburg-Handewitt	Stade Pierre de Coubertin, Paris; Attendance: 2,911; Referees: Nikolov, Nachevski (MKD)
24 February 2022; 20:45	Steins 7	(17–13)	Semper 7	Stade Pierre de Coubertin, Paris; Attendance: 2,911; Referees: Nikolov, Nachevski (MKD)
24 February 2022; 20:45	1× (yellow card) 3× (suspension)	Report	1× (yellow card) 3× (suspension)	Stade Pierre de Coubertin, Paris; Attendance: 2,911; Referees: Nikolov, Nachevski (MKD)

24 February 2022; 20:45	FC Porto (Portugal)	31–32	(Romania) Dinamo București	Dragão Arena, Porto; Attendance: 1,091; Referees: Jørum, Kleven (NOR)
24 February 2022; 20:45	Magalhães 6	(12–12)	Pascual García 6	Dragão Arena, Porto; Attendance: 1,091; Referees: Jørum, Kleven (NOR)
24 February 2022; 20:45	1× (yellow card) 2× (suspension)	Report	1× (yellow card) 2× (suspension)	Dragão Arena, Porto; Attendance: 1,091; Referees: Jørum, Kleven (NOR)

2 March 2022; 20:45	SG Flensburg-Handewitt (Germany)	26–26	(Portugal) FC Porto	Flens-Arena, Flensburg; Attendance: 1,134; Referees: Pavićević, Ražnatović (MNE)
2 March 2022; 20:45	Einarsson 8	(14–13)	M'Bengue 6	Flens-Arena, Flensburg; Attendance: 1,134; Referees: Pavićević, Ražnatović (MNE)
2 March 2022; 20:45	1× (suspension)	Report	1× (suspension)	Flens-Arena, Flensburg; Attendance: 1,134; Referees: Pavićević, Ražnatović (MNE)

3 March 2022; 18:45	Telekom Veszprém (Hungary)	35–33	(Poland) Łomża Vive Kielce	Veszprém Aréna, Veszprém; Attendance: 5,019; Referees: Nikolov, Nachevski (MKD)
3 March 2022; 18:45	Mahé, Nenadić 6	(18–16)	A. Dujshebaev, Nahi 6	Veszprém Aréna, Veszprém; Attendance: 5,019; Referees: Nikolov, Nachevski (MKD)
3 March 2022; 18:45	2× (yellow card) 4× (suspension)	Report	1× (yellow card) 3× (suspension)	Veszprém Aréna, Veszprém; Attendance: 5,019; Referees: Nikolov, Nachevski (MKD)

3 March 2022; 18:45	Dinamo București (Romania)	31–39	(France) Paris Saint-Germain	Dinamo Polyvalent Hall, Bucharest; Attendance: 3,000; Referees: Elíasson, Pálsson (ISL)
3 March 2022; 18:45	Nantes 7	(16–20)	Hansen 7	Dinamo Polyvalent Hall, Bucharest; Attendance: 3,000; Referees: Elíasson, Pálsson (ISL)
3 March 2022; 18:45	1× (yellow card) 5× (suspension)	Report	1× (yellow card) 3× (suspension)	Dinamo Polyvalent Hall, Bucharest; Attendance: 3,000; Referees: Elíasson, Pálsson (ISL)

9 March 2022; 18:45	Łomża Vive Kielce (Poland)	34–29	(Romania) Dinamo București	Hala Legionów, Kielce; Attendance: 4,200; Referees: Jurinović, Mrvica (CRO)
9 March 2022; 18:45	Moryto 8	(20–13)	Shebib 7	Hala Legionów, Kielce; Attendance: 4,200; Referees: Jurinović, Mrvica (CRO)
9 March 2022; 18:45	1× (yellow card) 3× (suspension)	Report	1× (yellow card) 5× (suspension) 1× (red card)	Hala Legionów, Kielce; Attendance: 4,200; Referees: Jurinović, Mrvica (CRO)

10 March 2022; 18:45	Barça (Spain)	29–22	(Germany) SG Flensburg-Handewitt	Palau Blaugrana, Barcelona; Attendance: 2,159; Referees: Hansen, Madsen (DEN)
10 March 2022; 18:45	Gómez 9	(15–11)	Wanne 6	Palau Blaugrana, Barcelona; Attendance: 2,159; Referees: Hansen, Madsen (DEN)
10 March 2022; 18:45	1× (suspension)	Report	1× (yellow card) 2× (suspension)	Palau Blaugrana, Barcelona; Attendance: 2,159; Referees: Hansen, Madsen (DEN)

10 March 2022; 20:45	Paris Saint-Germain (France)	39–40	(Hungary) Telekom Veszprém	Stade Pierre de Coubertin, Paris; Attendance: 2,618; Referees: Santos, Fonseca (POR)
10 March 2022; 20:45	N. Karabatić 8	(19–20)	Nenadić 9	Stade Pierre de Coubertin, Paris; Attendance: 2,618; Referees: Santos, Fonseca (POR)
10 March 2022; 20:45	5× (suspension) 1× (red card)	Report	2× (yellow card) 9× (suspension) 1× (red card)	Stade Pierre de Coubertin, Paris; Attendance: 2,618; Referees: Santos, Fonseca (POR)

Cancelled	Motor (Ukraine)	0–10	(France) Paris Saint-Germain

Cancelled	Motor (Ukraine)	0–10	(Spain) Barça

Cancelled	FC Porto (Portugal)	10–0	(Ukraine) Motor
