= 2021–22 EHF Champions League knockout stage =

The 2021–22 EHF Champions League knockout stage began on 30 March with the playoffs and ended on 19 June 2022 with the final at the Lanxess Arena in Cologne, Germany, to decide the winners of the 2021–22 EHF Champions League. A total of twelve teams will compete in the knockout phase.

== Format ==
In the playoffs, the eight teams ranked third to sixth in Groups A and B played against each other in two-legged home-and-away matches. The four winning teams advanced to the quarterfinals, where they are joined by the top-two teams of Groups A and B for another round of two-legged home-and-away matches. The four quarterfinal winners qualified for the final four tournament at the Lanxess Arena in Cologne, Germany.

== Qualified teams ==
The top six teams from Groups A and B qualified for the knockout stage.

Group	Qualified for quarterfinals		Qualified for playoffs			
Group	First place	Second place	Third place	Fourth place	Fifth place	Sixth place
A	(Denmark) Aalborg Håndbold	(Germany) THW Kiel	(Hungary) Pick Szeged	(France) Montpellier Handball	(North Macedonia) RK Vardar	(Norway) Elverum Håndball
B	(Poland) Łomża Vive Kielce	(Spain) Barça	(France) Paris Saint-Germain	(Hungary) Telekom Veszprém	(Portugal) FC Porto	(Germany) SG Flensburg-Handewitt

== Playoffs ==
=== Overview ===
Team 1	Agg.	Team 2	1st leg	2nd leg
SG Flensburg-Handewitt (Germany)	60–57	(Hungary) Pick Szeged	25–21	35–36
Elverum Håndball (Norway)	60–67	(France) Paris Saint-Germain	30–30	30–37
FC Porto (Portugal)	56–64	(France) Montpellier Handball	29–29	27–35
RK Vardar (North Macedonia)	53–61	(Hungary) Telekom Veszprém	22–30	31–31

==== Matches ====
30 March 2022; 20:45	SG Flensburg-Handewitt (Germany)	25–21	(Hungary) Pick Szeged	Flens-Arena, Flensburg; Attendance: 1,522; Referees: Jørum, Kleven (NOR)
30 March 2022; 20:45	Wanne 5	(14–10)	Garciandia 5	Flens-Arena, Flensburg; Attendance: 1,522; Referees: Jørum, Kleven (NOR)
30 March 2022; 20:45	1× (yellow card) 2× (suspension)	Report	2× (suspension) 1× (red card)	Flens-Arena, Flensburg; Attendance: 1,522; Referees: Jørum, Kleven (NOR)

7 April 2022; 18:45	Pick Szeged (Hungary)	36–35	(Germany) SG Flensburg-Handewitt	Pick Aréna, Szeged; Attendance: 7,300; Referees: Brunner, Salah (SUI)
7 April 2022; 18:45	Frimmel 6	(17–18)	Wanne 9	Pick Aréna, Szeged; Attendance: 7,300; Referees: Brunner, Salah (SUI)
7 April 2022; 18:45	1× (yellow card) 1× (suspension)	Report	1× (yellow card) 1× (suspension)	Pick Aréna, Szeged; Attendance: 7,300; Referees: Brunner, Salah (SUI)

SG Flensburg-Handewitt won 60–57 on aggregate.

30 March 2022; 18:45	Elverum Håndball (Norway)	30–30	(France) Paris Saint-Germain	Terningen Arena, Elverum; Attendance: 2,230; Referees: Madsen, Mortensen (DEN)
30 March 2022; 18:45	Solstad 9	(13–15)	Syprzak 12	Terningen Arena, Elverum; Attendance: 2,230; Referees: Madsen, Mortensen (DEN)
30 March 2022; 18:45	2× (suspension)	Report	2× (yellow card) 1× (suspension)	Terningen Arena, Elverum; Attendance: 2,230; Referees: Madsen, Mortensen (DEN)

7 April 2022; 20:45	Paris Saint-Germain (France)	37–30	(Norway) Elverum Håndball	Stade Pierre de Coubertin, Paris; Attendance: 3,000; Referees: Pavićević, Ražnatović (MNE)
7 April 2022; 20:45	Krištopāns, Syprzak 7	(20–14)	Moen Nilsen 10	Stade Pierre de Coubertin, Paris; Attendance: 3,000; Referees: Pavićević, Ražnatović (MNE)
7 April 2022; 20:45	2× (suspension)	Report	5× (suspension)	Stade Pierre de Coubertin, Paris; Attendance: 3,000; Referees: Pavićević, Ražnatović (MNE)

Paris Saint-Germain won 67–60 on aggregate.

31 March 2022; 20:45	FC Porto (Portugal)	29–29	(France) Montpellier Handball	Dragão Arena, Porto; Attendance: 1,518; Referees: Mažeika, Gatelis (LTU)
31 March 2022; 20:45	Areia 6	(13–14)	Simonet, Wallinius 5	Dragão Arena, Porto; Attendance: 1,518; Referees: Mažeika, Gatelis (LTU)
31 March 2022; 20:45	1× (yellow card) 6× (suspension)	Report	1× (yellow card) 2× (suspension)	Dragão Arena, Porto; Attendance: 1,518; Referees: Mažeika, Gatelis (LTU)

6 April 2022; 20:45	Montpellier Handball (France)	35–27	(Portugal) FC Porto	Sud de France Arena, Montpellier; Attendance: 3,000; Referees: Hansen, Madsen (DEN)
6 April 2022; 20:45	Descat 7	(19–11)	Salina 6	Sud de France Arena, Montpellier; Attendance: 3,000; Referees: Hansen, Madsen (DEN)
6 April 2022; 20:45	1× (yellow card) 2× (suspension)	Report	1× (suspension)	Sud de France Arena, Montpellier; Attendance: 3,000; Referees: Hansen, Madsen (DEN)

Montpellier Handball won 64–56 on aggregate.

31 March 2022; 18:45	RK Vardar (North Macedonia)	22–30	(Hungary) Telekom Veszprém	Jane Sandanski Arena, Skopje; Attendance: 4,800; Referees: Jurinović, Mrvica (CRO)
31 March 2022; 18:45	Dibirov, Taleski 6	(11–15)	Nilsson 8	Jane Sandanski Arena, Skopje; Attendance: 4,800; Referees: Jurinović, Mrvica (CRO)
31 March 2022; 18:45	1× (yellow card) 2× (suspension)	Report	3× (yellow card) 1× (suspension)	Jane Sandanski Arena, Skopje; Attendance: 4,800; Referees: Jurinović, Mrvica (CRO)

6 April 2022; 18:45	Telekom Veszprém (Hungary)	31–31	(North Macedonia) RK Vardar	Veszprém Aréna, Veszprém; Attendance: 5,019; Referees: Kurtagic, Wetterwik (SWE)
6 April 2022; 18:45	Omar 7	(18–13)	Morales 6	Veszprém Aréna, Veszprém; Attendance: 5,019; Referees: Kurtagic, Wetterwik (SWE)
6 April 2022; 18:45	5× (suspension)	Report	4× (suspension)	Veszprém Aréna, Veszprém; Attendance: 5,019; Referees: Kurtagic, Wetterwik (SWE)

Telekom Veszprém won 61–53 on aggregate.

== Quarterfinals ==
=== Overview ===
Team 1	Agg.	Team 2	1st leg	2nd leg
Telekom Veszprém (Hungary)	71–66	(Denmark) Aalborg Håndbold	36–29	35–37
Montpellier Handball (France)	50–61	(Poland) Łomża Vive Kielce	28–31	22–30
Paris Saint-Germain (France)	62–63	(Germany) THW Kiel	30–30	32–33
SG Flensburg-Handewitt (Germany)	53–60	(Spain) Barça	29–33	24–27

==== Matches ====
12 May 2022; 18:45	Telekom Veszprém (Hungary)	36–29	(Denmark) Aalborg Håndbold	Veszprém Aréna, Veszprém; Attendance: 5,256; Referees: Lah, Sok (SLO)
12 May 2022; 18:45	Marguč 7	(17–16)	Juul 6	Veszprém Aréna, Veszprém; Attendance: 5,256; Referees: Lah, Sok (SLO)
12 May 2022; 18:45	3× (yellow card) 4× (suspension)	Report	2× (yellow card) 6× (suspension)	Veszprém Aréna, Veszprém; Attendance: 5,256; Referees: Lah, Sok (SLO)

18 May 2022; 18:45	Aalborg Håndbold (Denmark)	37–35	(Hungary) Telekom Veszprém	Gigantium, Aalborg; Attendance: 5,020; Referees: Schulze, Tönnies (GER)
18 May 2022; 18:45	Bjørnsen, Juul 9	(20–21)	Lauge, Mahé 6	Gigantium, Aalborg; Attendance: 5,020; Referees: Schulze, Tönnies (GER)
18 May 2022; 18:45	1× (yellow card) 3× (suspension)	Report	2× (yellow card) 5× (suspension)	Gigantium, Aalborg; Attendance: 5,020; Referees: Schulze, Tönnies (GER)

Telekom Veszprém won 71–66 on aggregate.

12 May 2022; 20:45	Montpellier Handball (France)	28–31	(Poland) Łomża Vive Kielce	Sud de France Arena, Montpellier; Attendance: 6,700; Referees: Baumgart, Wild (GER)
12 May 2022; 20:45	Descat 5	(12–16)	A. Dujshebaev 7	Sud de France Arena, Montpellier; Attendance: 6,700; Referees: Baumgart, Wild (GER)
12 May 2022; 20:45	1× (yellow card) 5× (suspension)	Report	5× (suspension) 1× (red card)	Sud de France Arena, Montpellier; Attendance: 6,700; Referees: Baumgart, Wild (GER)

18 May 2022; 20:45	Łomża Vive Kielce (Poland)	30–22	(France) Montpellier Handball	Hala Legionów, Kielce; Attendance: 4,200; Referees: Marín, García (ESP)
18 May 2022; 20:45	Karalek 7	(15–8)	Bos 7	Hala Legionów, Kielce; Attendance: 4,200; Referees: Marín, García (ESP)
18 May 2022; 20:45	1× (yellow card) 3× (suspension)	Report	2× (yellow card) 2× (suspension)	Hala Legionów, Kielce; Attendance: 4,200; Referees: Marín, García (ESP)

Łomża Vive Kielce won 61–50 on aggregate.

11 May 2022; 20:45	Paris Saint-Germain (France)	30–30	(Germany) THW Kiel	Stade Pierre de Coubertin, Paris; Attendance: 3,000; Referees: Kurtagic, Wetterwik (SWE)
11 May 2022; 20:45	Remili 8	(14–16)	Sagosen 6	Stade Pierre de Coubertin, Paris; Attendance: 3,000; Referees: Kurtagic, Wetterwik (SWE)
11 May 2022; 20:45	3× (suspension)	Report	6× (suspension)	Stade Pierre de Coubertin, Paris; Attendance: 3,000; Referees: Kurtagic, Wetterwik (SWE)

19 May 2022; 20:45	THW Kiel (Germany)	33–32	(France) Paris Saint-Germain	Sparkassen-Arena, Kiel; Attendance: 10,285; Referees: Nikolov, Nachevski (MKD)
19 May 2022; 20:45	M. Landin 7	(17–19)	Remili 8	Sparkassen-Arena, Kiel; Attendance: 10,285; Referees: Nikolov, Nachevski (MKD)
19 May 2022; 20:45	1× (yellow card) 4× (suspension)	Report	1× (yellow card) 7× (suspension)	Sparkassen-Arena, Kiel; Attendance: 10,285; Referees: Nikolov, Nachevski (MKD)

THW Kiel won 63–62 on aggregate.

11 May 2022; 18:45	SG Flensburg-Handewitt (Germany)	29–33	(Spain) Barça	Flens-Arena, Flensburg; Attendance: 5,066; Referees: Horáček, Novotný (CZE)
11 May 2022; 18:45	Jakobsen 9	(13–18)	Benali 8	Flens-Arena, Flensburg; Attendance: 5,066; Referees: Horáček, Novotný (CZE)
11 May 2022; 18:45	4× (suspension)	Report	4× (suspension)	Flens-Arena, Flensburg; Attendance: 5,066; Referees: Horáček, Novotný (CZE)

19 May 2022; 18:45	Barça (Spain)	27–24	(Germany) SG Flensburg-Handewitt	Palau Blaugrana, Barcelona; Attendance: 4,184; Referees: Mrvica, Jurinović (CRO)
19 May 2022; 18:45	Mem 6	(10–10)	Wanne 6	Palau Blaugrana, Barcelona; Attendance: 4,184; Referees: Mrvica, Jurinović (CRO)
19 May 2022; 18:45	1× (suspension)	Report	4× (suspension)	Palau Blaugrana, Barcelona; Attendance: 4,184; Referees: Mrvica, Jurinović (CRO)

Barcelona won 60–53 on aggregate.

== Final four ==
The final four will held at the Lanxess Arena in Cologne, Germany on 18 and 19 June 2022. The draw took place on 24 May 2022.

=== Bracket ===
Semi-finals
18 June
(Germany) THW Kiel	30
(Spain) Barça	34
18 June
(Hungary) Telekom Veszprém	35
(Poland) Łomża Vive Kielce	37

Final
19 June
(Spain) Barça (Pen.)	32 (5)
(Poland) Łomża Vive Kielce	32 (3)
Third place
19 June
(Germany) THW Kiel (Pen.)	34 (3)
(Hungary) Telekom Veszprém	34 (1)

=== Semifinals ===
18 June 2022; 15:15	Telekom Veszprém (Hungary)	35–37	(Poland) Łomża Vive Kielce	Lanxess Arena, Cologne; Attendance: 19,250; Referees: Hansen, Madsen (DEN)
18 June 2022; 15:15	Lauge 8	(18–16)	Moryto 8	Lanxess Arena, Cologne; Attendance: 19,250; Referees: Hansen, Madsen (DEN)
18 June 2022; 15:15	1× (yellow card) 7× (suspension) 1× (red card)	Report	5× (suspension)	Lanxess Arena, Cologne; Attendance: 19,250; Referees: Hansen, Madsen (DEN)

18 June 2022; 18:00	THW Kiel (Germany)	30–34	(Spain) Barça	Lanxess Arena, Cologne; Attendance: 19,250; Referees: Nikolić, Stojković (SRB)
18 June 2022; 18:00	Wiencek 7	(18–19)	Gómez 12	Lanxess Arena, Cologne; Attendance: 19,250; Referees: Nikolić, Stojković (SRB)
18 June 2022; 18:00	2× (yellow card) 5× (suspension)	Report	1× (yellow card) 6× (suspension) 1× (red card)	Lanxess Arena, Cologne; Attendance: 19,250; Referees: Nikolić, Stojković (SRB)

=== Third place game ===
19 June 2022
15:15
THW Kiel (Germany)
37–35
(Hungary) Telekom Veszprém
Lanxess Arena, Cologne
Attendance: 19,250
Referees: Gasmi, Gasmi (FRA)
Bilyk 7
(14–18)
Omar 8
1× (yellow card) 2× (suspension)
Report
4× (suspension)

FT: 34–34 Pen: 3–1

=== Final ===
19 June 2022
18:00
Barça (Spain)
37–35 (ET)
(Poland) Łomża Vive Kielce
Lanxess Arena, Cologne
Attendance: 19,250
Referees: Gubica, Milošević (CRO)
Gómez 10
(14–13)
Moryto 6
3× (suspension)
Report
4× (suspension)

FT: 28–28 ET: 4–4 Pen: 5–3

(Spain) Barça
1	GK	(Spain) Gonzalo Pérez de Vargas	12/44
40	GK	(Argentina) Leonel Maciel	0/0
10	RB	(France) Dika Mem	5/10	Penalty scored
13	LW	(Spain) Aitor Ariño	3/4
18	RW	(Slovenia) Blaž Janc	1/1
19	LB	(France) Timothey N'Guessan	5/10
20	RW	(Spain) Aleix Gómez	9/12	Penalty scored
22	LB	(Brazil) Thiagus dos Santos	1/1	Suspension
25	CB	(Croatia) Luka Cindrić	0/1
32	LW	(Spain) Ángel Fernández Pérez	3/3	Suspension
35	CB	(Slovenia) Domen Makuc	1/1
37	LB	(Brazil) Haniel Langaro	1/2
41	P	(Tunisia) (Qatar) Youssef Benali	0/0
66	RB	(France) Melvyn Richardson	2/4	Penalty scored
72	P	(France) Ludovic Fabregas	1/2	Penalty scored
90	RL	(Egypt) Ali Zein	0/0	Suspension Penalty scored
Coach : (Spain) Antonio Carlos Ortega

(Spain)	Statistics (without penalties shootout)	(Poland)
32/51	Goals scored	32/51
62,7 %	% Success	62,7 %
5/5	7m shots	4/5
0	Yellow card	0
6 min	(suspension) Suspensions	8 min
0	Red card	0
12/44	Saves	12/44
27,2 %	% Saves	27,2 %

- tirs au but: (penalty scored) success, (penalty missed) failed.

(Poland) Kielce
33	GK	(Germany) Andreas Wolff	12/43
1	GK	(Poland) Mateusz Kornecki	0/1
2 •	RB	(Montenegro) Branko Vujović	4/4
4 •	LW	(Spain) Miguel Sánchez-Migallón	0/0
5	CB	(Poland) Michał Olejniczak	0/0
9 •	LB	(Poland) Szymon Sićko	3/7
10	RW	(Spain) Alex Dujshebaev	4/9	Suspension Penalty missed
11	P	(France) Nicolas Tournat	2/2
18 •	CB	(Croatia) Igor Karačić	1/1	Penalty scored
22	LB	(Belarus) Uladzislau Kulesh	4/6
23 •	RW	(Poland) Arkadiusz Moryto	4/7	Penalty scored
24	LB	(Spain) Daniel Dujshebaev	4/8	Penalty scored
34	RB	(Poland) Paweł Paczkowski	0/0
48	RB	(Poland) Tomasz Gębala	0/0	Suspension
50	P	(Belarus) Artsem Karalek	4/5	Suspension
99 •	LW	(France) Dylan Nahi	2/2	Suspension
Coach : (Russia) (Spain) Talant Dujshebaev

View source data.
