= 2021–22 EHF Champions League =

European men's club handball tournament

EHF Champions League
- 2021–22

Tournament information
- Sport: Handball
- Location: Lanxess Arena (FINAL4)
- Dates: 15 September 2021–19 June 2022
- Teams: 16
- Website: ehfcl.com

Final positions
- Champions: (Spain) Barça
- Runner-up: (Poland) Łomża Vive Kielce

Tournament statistics
- Matches played: 126
- Goals scored: 7682 (60.97 per match)
- Attendance: 432,271 (3,431 per match)
- Top scorer(s): (Spain) Aleix Gómez (104 goals)

The 2021–22 EHF Champions League was the 62nd edition of Europe's premier club handball tournament and the 29th edition under the current EHF Champions League format, running from 15 September 2021 to 19 June 2022. Barça won the competition, defeating Łomza Vive Kielce on penalties in the final.

Because of the COVID-19 pandemic, each local health department allowed a different number of spectators.

== Format ==
The competition began with a group stage featuring 16 teams divided in two groups. Matches were played in a double round-robin system with home-and-away fixtures. In Groups A and B, the top two teams qualified for the quarterfinals, with teams ranked third to sixth entering the playoffs.

The knockout stage included four rounds: the playoffs, quarterfinals, and a final-four tournament comprising two semifinals and the final. In the playoffs, eight teams were paired against each other in two-legged home-and-away matches. The four aggregate winners of the playoffs advanced to the quarterfinals, joining the top-two teams of Groups A and B. The eight quarterfinalist teams were paired against each other in two-legged home-and-away matches, with the four aggregate winners qualifying to the final-four tournament.

In the final four tournament, the semifinals and the final were played as single matches at a pre-selected host venue.

== Teams ==
Location of teams of the 2022–23 EHF Champions League group stage.
Red: Group A; Blue: Group B.

The final list of 16 participants was revealed by the EHF Executive Committee in June 2021. Ten teams were registered according to fixed places, while six were granted wild cards. On 29 June, the final list was revealed. Although, in the final list announcement, the EHF said that if RK Vardar did not pay a fine for failing to play Champions League games in the previous season, they would be disqualified and replaced with RK Gorenje Velenje, who was the standby team. However, this never materialised.

Participating teams
(Germany) THW Kiel (1st)	(France) Paris Saint-Germain (1st)	(Spain) Barça (1st)	(Hungary) Pick Szeged (1st)
(North Macedonia) RK Vardar (1st)	(Poland) Łomża Vive Kielce (1st)	(Denmark) Aalborg Håndbold (1st)	(Portugal) FC Porto (1st)
(Croatia) PPD Zagreb (1st)	(Germany) SG Flensburg-Handewitt (2nd)	(Belarus) Meshkov Brest (WC)	(France) Montpellier Handball (WC)
(Hungary) Telekom Veszprém (WC)	(Norway) Elverum Håndball (WC)	(Romania) Dinamo București (WC)	(Ukraine) Motor (WC)

Wildcard rejection
(Sweden) IK Sävehof	(Denmark) GOG Håndbold	(Poland) Orlen Wisła Płock	(Portugal) Sporting CP
(Slovenia) RK Gorenje Velenje	(Switzerland) Kadetten Schaffhausen		

== Group stage ==
The draw took place on 2 July 2021.

=== Group A ===
Pos	Team	Pld	W	D	L	GF	GA	GD	Pts	Qualification	AAL	KIE	SZE	MON	VAR	ELV	ZAG	BRE
1	(Denmark) Aalborg Håndbold	14	11	0	3	453	410	+43	22	Quarterfinals	—	35–33	34–30	36–28	33–29	32–27	31–25	34–33
2	(Germany) THW Kiel	14	10	1	3	427	395	+32	21	Quarterfinals	31–27	—	32–32	35–26	32–30	41–36	36–28	10–0
3	(Hungary) Pick Szeged	14	8	3	3	412	392	+20	19	Playoffs	31–28	30–26	—	29–29	34–31	30–34	30–21	28–26
4	(France) Montpellier Handball	14	7	3	4	424	409	+15	17	Playoffs	31–33	37–30	29–29	—	25–28	39–32	24–23	32–26
5	(North Macedonia) RK Vardar	14	6	1	7	379	368	+11	13	Playoffs	30–28	26–29	27–30	25–31	—	39–30	20–19	35–27
6	(Norway) Elverum Håndball	14	3	2	9	417	449	−32	8 (Note: Elverum 57–52 Zagreb)	Playoffs	28–34	30–31	24–27	30–37	27–27	—	30–25	32–33
7	(Croatia) PPD Zagreb	14	3	2	9	351	385	−34	8		24–34	27–28	26–24	22–25	23–22	27–27	—	31–24
8	(Belarus) Meshkov Brest	14	1	2	11	342	397	−55	4		30–33	30–33	25–28	31–31	0–10	27–30	30–30	—

Source: EHF
Rules for classification: Tiebreakers

=== Group B ===
Pos	Team	Pld	W	D	L	GF	GA	GD	Pts	Qualification	KIE	BAR	PAR	VES	POR	FLE	BUC	MOT
1	(Poland) Łomża Vive Kielce	14	10	0	4	449	415	+34	20 (Note: Kielce 61–57 Barça)	Quarterfinals	—	29–27	38–33	32–29	39–33	37–29	34–29	33–27
2	(Spain) Barça	14	9	2	3	420	369	+51	20	Quarterfinals	30–32	—	30–27	35–30	38–31	29–22	36–32	36–25
3	(France) Paris Saint-Germain	14	8	2	4	452	396	+56	18	Playoffs	32–27	28–28	—	39–40	33–19	33–30	41–30	40–32
4	(Hungary) Telekom Veszprém	14	8	1	5	449	423	+26	17	Playoffs	35–33	29–28	34–31	—	28–28	28–23	47–32	36–29
5	(Portugal) FC Porto	14	4	3	7	375	408	−33	11	Playoffs	29–27	33–33	30–39	23–30	—	28–27	31–32	10–0
6	(Germany) SG Flensburg-Handewitt	14	4	2	8	381	401	−20	10	Playoffs	25–33	21–25	27–27	30–27	26–26	—	37–30	34–27
7	(Romania) Dinamo București	14	4	0	10	415	470	−55	8 (Note: Dinamo 60–57 Motor)		32–29	30–35	31–39	31–29	26–27	20–28	—	33–29
8	(Ukraine) Motor	14	4	0	10	312	371	−59	8		25–26	0–10	0–10	29–27	30–27	31–22	28–27	—

Source: EHF
Rules for classification: Tiebreakers

== Knockout stage ==
=== Playoffs ===
Team 1	Agg.	Team 2	1st leg	2nd leg
SG Flensburg-Handewitt (Germany)	60–57	(Hungary) Pick Szeged	25–21	35–36
Elverum Håndball (Norway)	60–67	(France) Paris Saint-Germain	30–30	30–37
FC Porto (Portugal)	56–64	(France) Montpellier Handball	29–29	27–35
RK Vardar (North Macedonia)	53–61	(Hungary) Telekom Veszprém	22–30	31–31

=== Quarterfinals ===
Team 1	Agg.	Team 2	1st leg	2nd leg
Telekom Veszprém (Hungary)	71–66	(Denmark) Aalborg Håndbold	36–29	35–37
Montpellier Handball (France)	50–61	(Poland) Łomża Vive Kielce	28–31	22–30
Paris Saint-Germain (France)	62–63	(Germany) THW Kiel	30–30	32–33
SG Flensburg-Handewitt (Germany)	53–60	(Spain) Barça	29–33	24–27

=== Final four ===
The final four was held at the Lanxess Arena in Cologne, Germany on 18 and 19 June 2022.

==== Bracket ====
Semi-finals
18 June
(Germany) THW Kiel	30
(Spain) Barça	34
18 June
(Hungary) Telekom Veszprém	35
(Poland) Łomża Vive Kielce	37

Final
19 June
(Spain) Barça (Pen.)	32 (5)
(Poland) Łomża Vive Kielce	32 (3)
Third place
19 June
(Germany) THW Kiel (Pen.)	34 (3)
(Hungary) Telekom Veszprém	34 (1)

==== Final ====
19 June 2022
18:00
Barça (Spain)
37–35 (ET)
(Poland) Łomża Vive Kielce
Lanxess Arena, Cologne
Attendance: 19,250
Referees: Gubica, Milošević (CRO)
Gómez 10
(14–13)
Moryto 6
3× (suspension)
Report
4× (suspension)

FT: 28–28 ET: 4–4 Pen: 5–3

== Top goalscorers ==
Rank	Player	Club	Goals
1	(Spain) Aleix Gómez	(Spain) Barça	104
2	(France) Dika Mem	(Spain) Barça	100
3	(Serbia) Petar Nenadić	(Hungary) Telekom Veszprém	93
4	(Sweden) Felix Claar	(Denmark) Aalborg Håndbold	88
4	(Slovenia) Gašper Marguč	(Hungary) Telekom Veszprém	88
6	(Poland) Kamil Syprzak	(France) Paris Saint-Germain	86
7	(Egypt) Yahia Omar	(Hungary) Telekom Veszprém	83
8	(Norway) Tobias Grøndahl	(Norway) Elverum Håndball	81
8	(Sweden) Hampus Wanne	(Germany) SG Flensburg-Handewitt	81
10	(Poland) Arkadiusz Moryto	(Poland) Łomża Vive Kielce	79

== Awards ==
The all-star team was announced on 17 June 2022.

Position	Player
Goalkeeper	(Denmark) Niklas Landin Jacobsen (THW Kiel)
Right wing	(Spain) Aleix Gómez (Barça)
Right back	(France) Dika Mem (Barça)
Centre back	(France) Kentin Mahé (Telekom Veszprém)
Left back	(Serbia) Petar Nenadić (Telekom Veszprém)
Left wing	(Sweden) Hampus Wanne (SG Flensburg-Handewitt)
Pivot	(Poland) Kamil Syprzak (Paris Saint-Germain)
Final four MVP	(Belarus) Artsem Karalek (Łomża Vive Kielce)
Best defender	(Germany) Hendrik Pekeler (THW Kiel)
Best young player	(Norway) Tobias Grøndahl (Elverum Håndball)
Best coach	(Spain) Talant Dujshebaev (Łomża Vive Kielce)

Best Coach: (Spain) Talant Dujshebaev
