= Imanol Garciandia =

Spanish handball player (born 1995)

Personal information
- Full name: Imanol Garciandia Alustiza
- Nationality: Spanish
- Born: 30 April 1995 (age 31) Urretxu, Spain
- Height: 2.04 m (6 ft 8 in)

Sport
- Sport: Handball
- Position: Right back
- Current club: OTP Bank-Pick Szeged
- Number: 41

Youth career
- Years: Team
- –2012: SD Urola
- 2012–2015: Sanlo EKT

Senior clubs
- Years: Team
- 2015–2020: CB Ciudad de Logroño
- 2020–2021: Pays d'Aix UC
- 2021–2026: OTP Bank-Pick Szeged
- 2026–: HBC Nantes
National team
Years	Team	Apps	(Gls)
2018–	Spain	66	(166)
Medal record
Olympic Games
Bronze medal – third place	2024 Paris	Team
World Championship
Bronze medal – third place	2023 Poland/Sweden
Mediterranean Games
Gold medal – first place	2022 Oran	Team
Bronze medal – third place	2018 Tarragona	Team
- Updated on 13 January 2025

Imanol Garciandia Alustiza (Note: In this Spanish name, the first or paternal surname is Garciandia and the second or maternal family name is Alustiza.) (born 30 April 1995) is a Spanish handball player who plays for OTP Bank-Pick Szeged and the Spanish national team.

== Club career ==
Garciandia learned to play handball at SD Urola, a sports club in the two municipalities of Urretxu and Zumarraga in the Basque Country. The left-hander joined first division club CB Ciudad de Logroño in 2015 via Sanlo EKT in Elgoibar, with whom he finished runner-up in the Liga ASOBAL behind FC Barcelona in the 2015–16 season. In the Copa del Rey in 2016–17 and 2017–18, he and the team from the La Rioja region only lost in the final against Barca, as well as in the Copa ASOBAL 2015–16 and the Supercopa ASOBAL 2017–18. In the European Cup, he gained experience in the 2015–16 and 2016–17 EHF Champions League and in the 2017–18, 2018–19 and 2019–20 EHF Cup. For Ciudad de Logroño, the Garciandia scored 378 goals in 139 league games.

In the 2020–21 season, Garciandia played for the club Pays d'Aix in the French Starligue, where he scored 104 goals in 30 games. In the 2021–22 season, Garciandia signed a contract with the Hungarian first division club Pick Szeged. With Szeged, he won the Hungarian championship in 2022. In the 2021–22 EHF Champions League, the team reached the round of 16.

== International career ==
Garciandia made his debut for the Spanish national team on 20 June 2018 against Poland. At the subsequent 2018 Mediterranean Games in Tarragona, he won the bronze medal with the selection and the gold medal at the 2022 Mediterranean Games. He took part in a World Championship for the first time in January 2023 in Poland and Sweden. He won the bronze medal with the Spanish selection at the 2023 World Championship.

By January 2023, Garciandia had played 47 international matches, in which he scored 120 goals.

== Honors ==
SC Pick Szeged

- Nemzeti Bajnokság I: 2021–22
