= Tobias Grøndahl =

Norwegian handball player (born 2001)

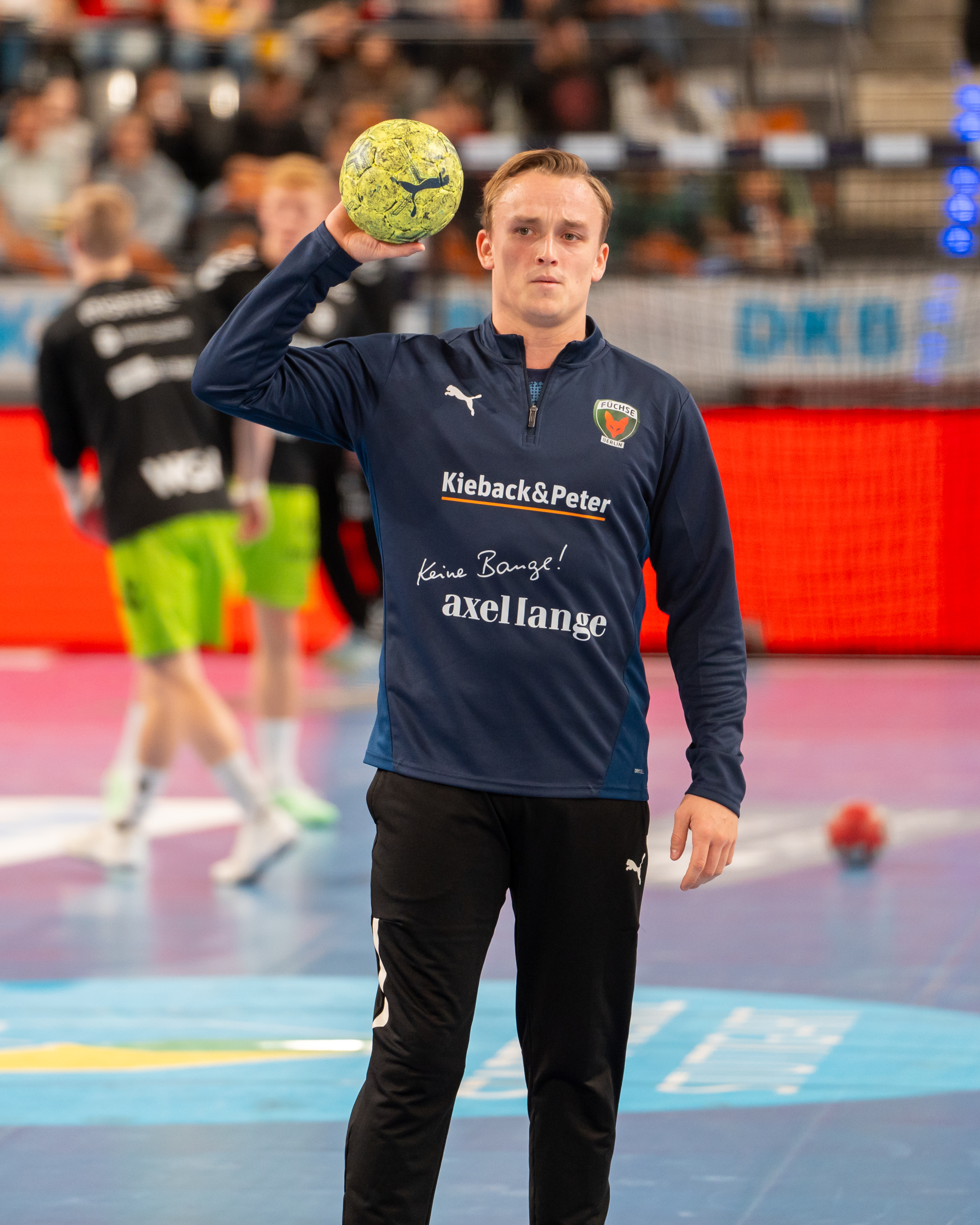
- Grøndahl in 2025

Personal information
- Full name: Tobias Schjølberg Grøndahl
- Nationality: Norwegian
- Born: 22 January 2001 (age 25) Bærum, Norway
- Height: 1.83 m (6 ft 0 in)

Sport
- Sport: Handball
- Position: Centre back
- Current club: Füchse Berlin
- Number: 15

Youth career
- Years: Team
- –: Vestre Bærum IF
- –: Haslum HK

Senior clubs
- Years: Team
- 2017–2019: Haslum HK
- 2019–2024: Elverum Håndball
- 2024–2025: GOG Håndbold
- 2025–: Füchse Berlin
National team
Years	Team	Apps	(Gls)
2021–	Norway	71	(243)
- Updated on 8 November 2026

Tobias Schjølberg Grøndahl (born 22 January 2001) is a Norwegian handball player for Füchse Berlin and the Norwegian national team. He participated at the 2023 World Men's Handball Championship.

== Career ==
Grøndahl started playing handball at Haslum HK, where his father was a youth coach. Until he was 16, he also played football until his football coach advised him to focus on handball. He debuted for the senior team in the 2017–18 season with a single game. The following season, he became a part of the rotation, playing 19 matches. In 2019, he switched to Norwegian champions Elverum Håndball. Here, he won the Norwegian championship in 2020, 2021, and 2022. In 2024, he switched to Danish side GOG Håndbold. At GOG, he was one of the most important players on the team when they finished 3rd in the Danish League. After a season, he was sold to German Füchse Berlin. GOG had initially rejected a transfer bid before accepting one that the club called "financially irresponsible to reject".

== Individual awards ==
- EHF Champions League All-Star Team as Best Young Player: 2022

== Personal life ==
Grøndahl is in a relationship with fellow handballer Lív Sveinbjørnsdóttir Poulsen. His father was also a handball player for Haslum HK and Elverum Håndball.
