= Yunist Palace of Sports =

Coordinates: 47.835023°N 35.123444°E

- Interactive map of Yunist Palace of Sports
- Location: Zaporizhia, Ukraine
- Capacity: 3,200

Construction
- Renovated: 2018; 8 years ago

Tenant
- HC Motor Zaporizhzhia

Website
- Venue Website

Palace of Sports "Yunist" (Ukrainian: Палац спорту «Юність») is an indoor arena in the eastern Ukrainian city Zaporizhia. Rebuilt in 2018, it has a seating capacity for 3,200 people and is a home arena of HC Motor Zaporizhzhia.

== See also ==
- Motor Sich
