= Julien Bos =

French handball player (born 1998)

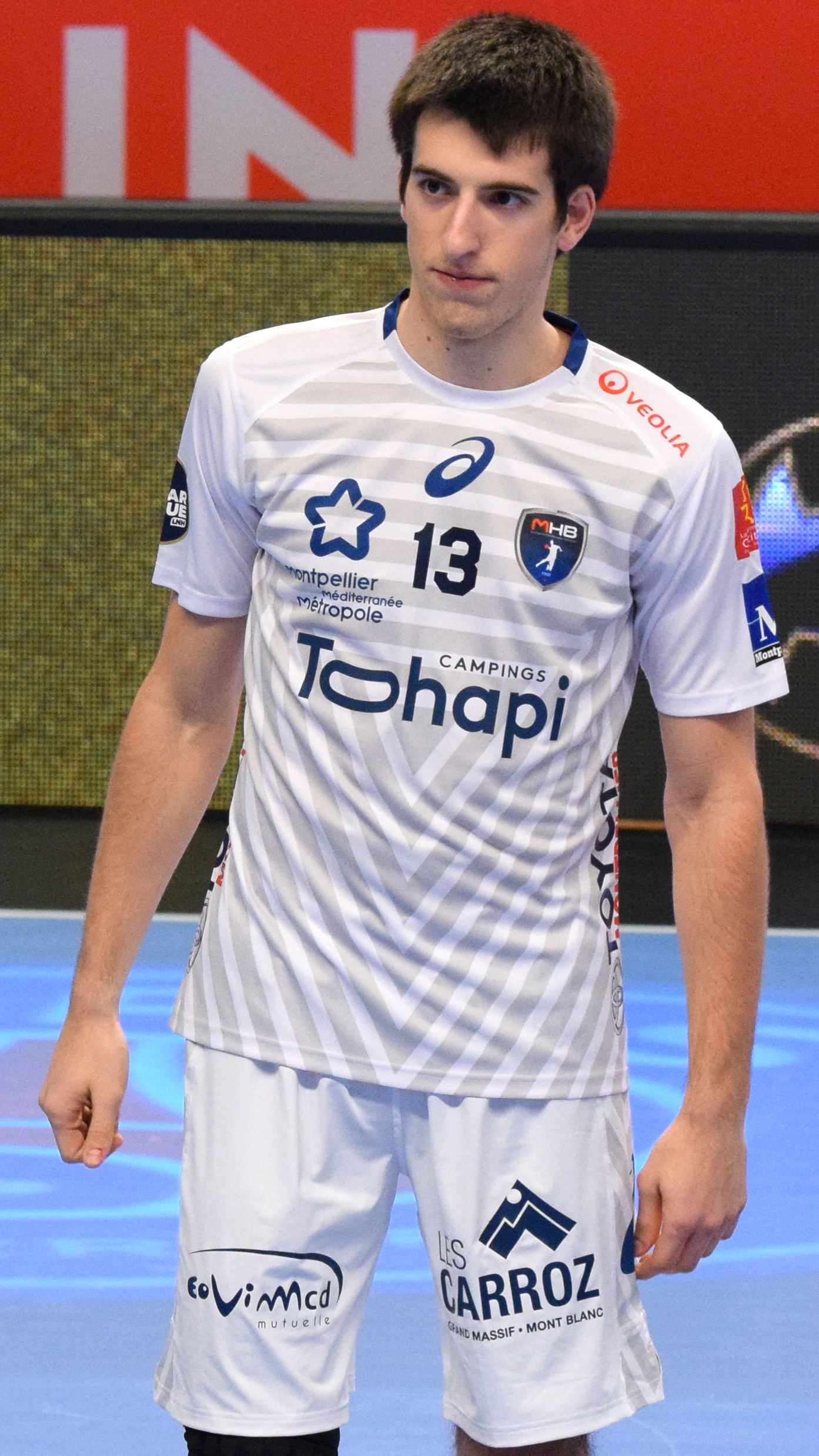

Personal information
- Nationality: French
- Born: 18 August 1998 (age 28) Pessac, France
- Height: 1.88 m (6 ft 2 in)

Sport
- Sport: Handball
- Position: Right back/wing
- Current club: HBC Nantes

Youth career
- Years: Team
- 2016–2018: Montpellier Handball

Senior clubs
- Years: Team
- 2018–2023: Montpellier Handball
- 2023–2026: HBC Nantes
- 2026–: Industria Kielce
National team
Years	Team	Apps	(Gls)
2021–	France	21	(34)
Medal record
World Championship
Bronze medal – third place	2025 Croatia/Denmark/Norway
Youth European Championship
Gold medal – first place	2016 Croatia
Youth World Championship
Gold medal – first place	2017 Georgia
Junior World Championship
Gold medal – first place	2019 Spain
Junior European Championship
Silver medal – second place	2018 Slovenia
- Updated on 14 January 2024

Julien Bos (born 18 August 1998) is a French handball player for HBC Nantes and France men's national handball team.

== Career ==
Julien Bos joined the Montpellier Handball youth academy in 2016. In the first season he broke through on the first team. In 2018 he signed his first professional contract.

In 2023 he joined HBC Nantes. Here he won the 2024 Coupe de France.

He debuted for the French national team on November 6th 2021 in a 26:31 defeat to Denmark. At the 2025 World Championship he won bronze medals with France, losing to Croatia in the semifinal and beating Portugal in the third place playoff.
