= Kentin Mahé =

French handball player (born 1991)

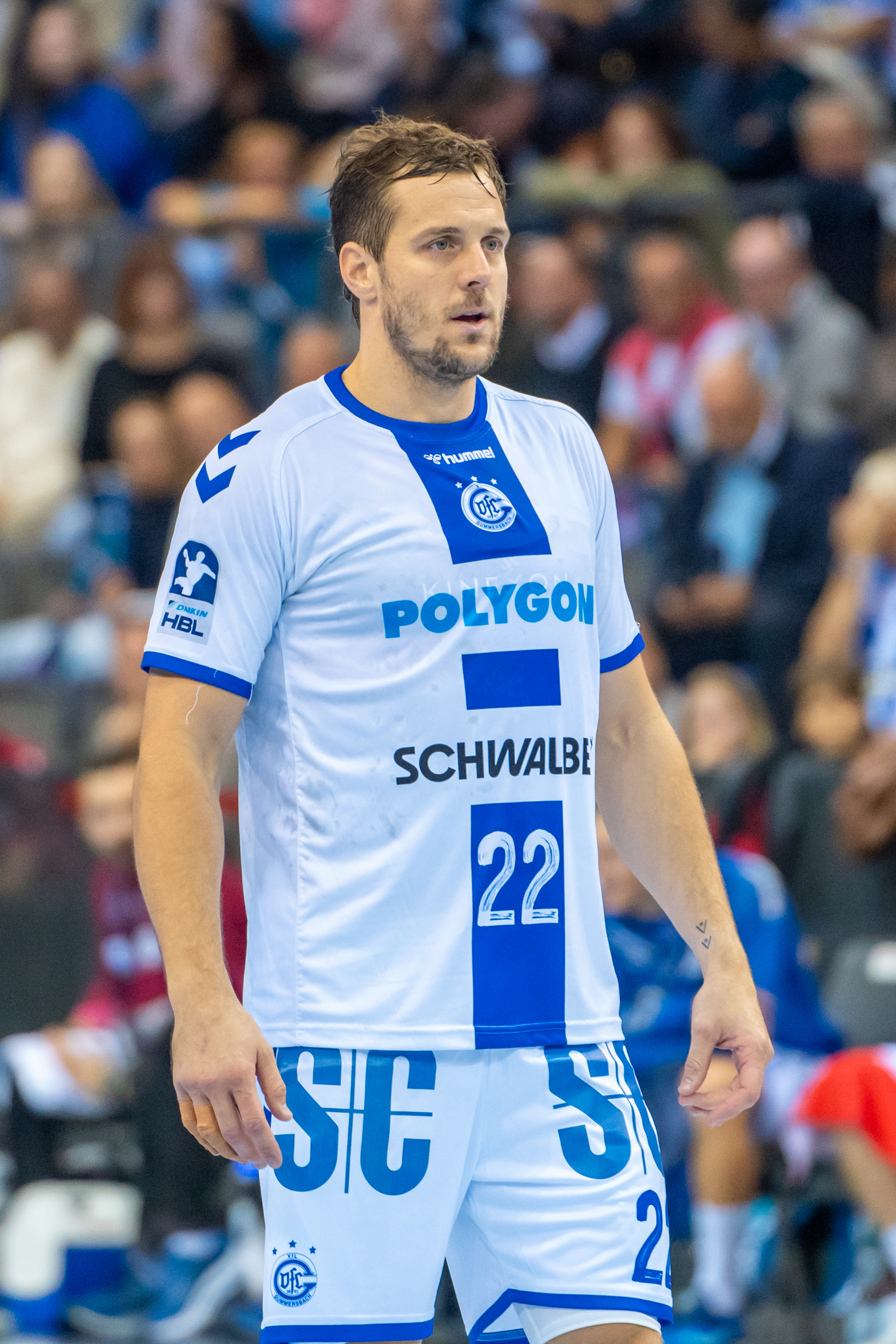
- Mahé in 2024

Personal information
- Nationality: French
- Born: 22 May 1991 (age 35) Paris, France
- Height: 1.86 m (6 ft 1 in)

Sport
- Sport: Handball
- Position: Centre back/Left Wing
- Current club: VfL Gummersbach
- Number: 22

Youth career
- Years: Team
- 1997–1999: AS Monaco
- 1999–2000: ASPTT Nice
- 2000–2008: TSV Bayer Dormagen
- 2008: Hammarby IF
- 2009: TSV Bayer Dormagen

Senior clubs
- Years: Team
- 2009–2011: DHC Rheinland
- 2011–2013: VfL Gummersbach
- 2013–2015: HSV Hamburg
- 2015–2018: SG Flensburg-Handewitt
- 2018–2024: Telekom Veszprém
- 2024–: VfL Gummersbach
National team
Years	Team	Apps	(Gls)
2010–2025	France	173	(558)
Medal record
Olympic Games
Gold medal – first place	2020 Tokyo	Team
Silver medal – second place	2016 Rio de Janeiro	Team
World Championship
Gold medal – first place	2015 Qatar
Gold medal – first place	2017 France
Silver medal – second place	2023 Poland/Sweden
Bronze medal – third place	2019 Germany/Denmark
European Championship
Gold medal – first place	2024 Germany
Bronze medal – third place	2018 Croatia
- Updated on 12 July 2024

Kentin Mahé (born 22 May 1991) is a French handball player for VfL Gummersbach.

== Early life ==
Kentin Mahé was born in Paris and started to play handball at age six in AS Monaco, before briefly representing ASPTT Nice. In 2000, he moved to Germany where he grew up, due to his father Pascal Mahé, a former handball player, taking up several managerial positions in the country.

His maternal grandmother is from Sweden and he lived in Stockholm for four months in 2008, aged 18, playing youth handball with then reigning national champions Hammarby IF.

== Career ==
Mahé returned to Germany in 2009 and made his senior debut for DHC Rheinland, before enjoying stints in VfL Gummersbach and HSV Hamburg.

In 2015, he signed with the German top club SG Flensburg-Handewitt where he developed into a world class-player under the management of Ljubomir Vranjes. He joined the Hungarian club Telekom Veszprém on 1 July 2018. Here he played for 6 years, where he won the Hungarian Championship 3 times, reached the EHF Champions League final in 2019 and won the SEHA League 3 times.

In 2024 he returned to VfL Gummersbach.

== Achievements ==
=== National team ===
- Olympic Games:
  - Gold: 2020
  - Silver: 2016
- World Championship:
  - Gold: 2015, 2017
  - Bronze: 2019
- European Men's Handball Championship
  - Bronze: 2018

=== Domestic competitions ===
- Handball-Bundesliga:
  - Gold: 2018
- Nemzeti Bajnokság I:
  - Gold: 2019, 2023, 2024
- Magyar Kupa
  - Gold: 2021, 2022, 2023, 2024
- EHF Champions League
  - Silver: 2019

== Individual awards ==
- MVP of the EHF Cup Final Four tournament: 2015
- All-Star team Best Centre Back of the EHF Champions League: 2019, 2022
