= Daymaro Salina =

Portuguese handball player (born 1987)

Personal information
- Full name: Daymaro Amador Salina
- Nationality: Portuguese
- Born: 1 September 1987 (age 39) Artemisa, Cuba
- Height: 2.00 m (6 ft 7 in)

Sport
- Sport: Handball
- Position: Pivot
- Current club: FC Porto
- Number: 15

Senior clubs
- Years: Team
- 2011–: FC Porto
National team
Years	Team	Apps	(Gls)
2017–	Portugal	44	(79)

Daymaro Amador Salina (Portuguese pronunciation: [dajˈmaɾu sɐˈlinɐ]; born 1 September 1987) is a Cuban-born Portuguese handballer for FC Porto and the Portuguese national team.

He represented Portugal at the 2020 European Men's Handball Championship.

== Honours ==
Porto

- Portuguese League: 2011–12, 2012–13, 2013–14, 2014–15, 2018–19, 2020–21, 2021–22, 2022–23
- Portuguese Cup: 2018–19, 2020–21
- Portuguese Super Cup: 2014, 2019, 2021
