= Dika Mem =

French handball player (born 1997)

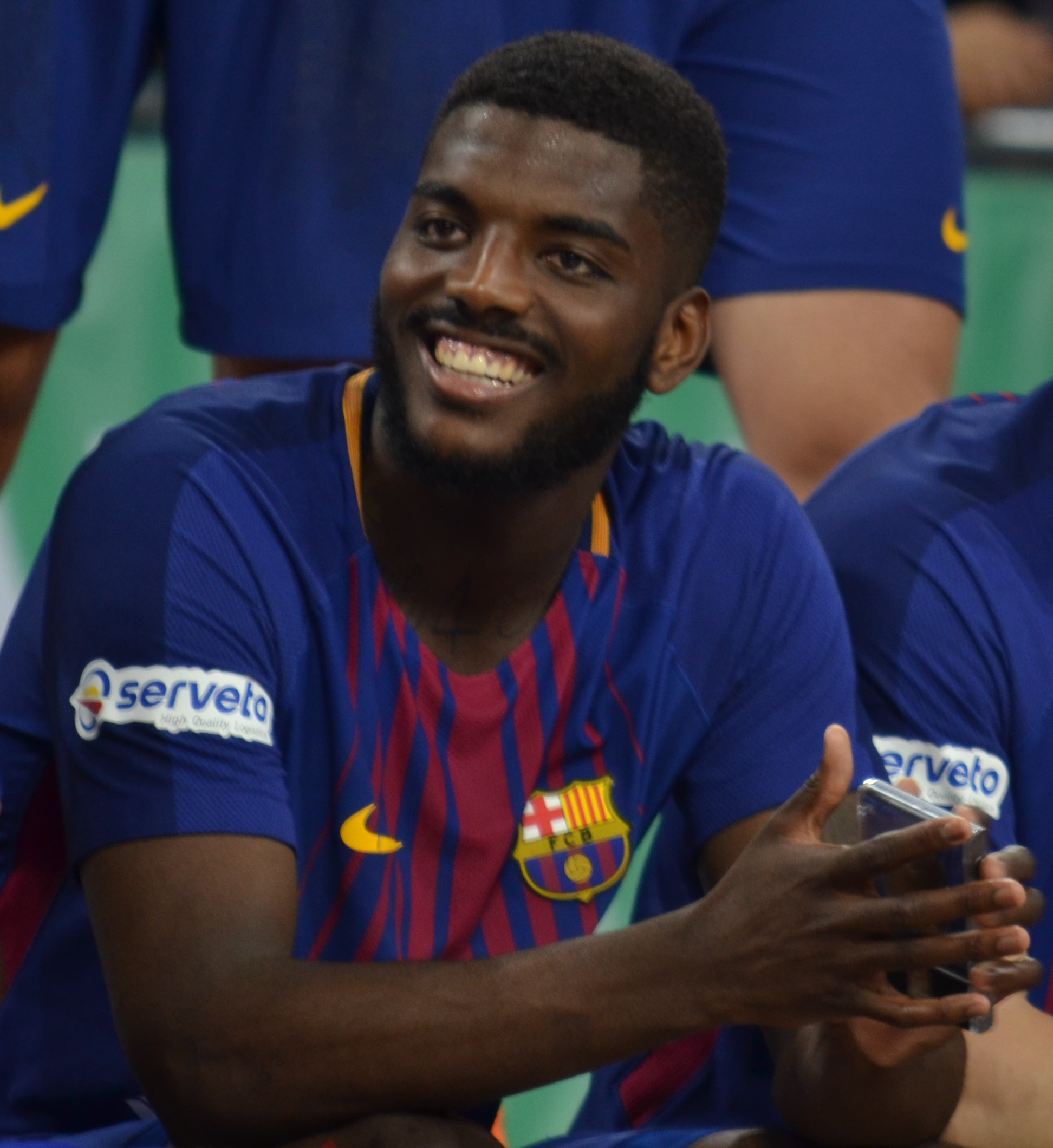
- Mem with FC Barcelona in 2018

Personal information
- Nationality: French
- Born: 31 August 1997 (age 29) Paris, France
- Height: 1.94 m (6 ft 4 in)

Sport
- Sport: Handball
- Position: Right back
- Current club: FC Barcelona
- Number: 10

Youth career
- Years: Team
- 2011-2013: CSM Eaubonne
- 2011-2013: Saint-Gratien/Sannois

Senior clubs
- Years: Team
- 2015–2016: Tremblay-en-France
- 2016–2027: FC Barcelona
- 2027–: Füchse Berlin
National team
| Years | Team | Apps | (Gls) |
| 2016– | France | 144 | (545) |
Medal record
Olympic Games
| Gold medal – first place | 2020 Tokyo | Team |
World Championship
| Gold medal – first place | 2017 France |
| Silver medal – second place | 2023 Poland/Sweden |
| Bronze medal – third place | 2019 Germany/Denmark |
| Bronze medal – third place | 2025 Croatia/Denmark/Norway |
European Championship
| Gold medal – first place | 2024 Germany |
| Bronze medal – third place | 2018 Croatia |
- Updated on 26 January 2026

Dika Mem (born 31 August 1997) is a French professional handball player for FC Barcelona and the French national handball team. He is widely regarded as one of the best players of his generation.

== Career ==
=== Youth career ===
Mem was a late starter, learning how to play at the age of 13. He began his career with French club CSM Eaubonne, where he played until he was 15 years old. The following two seasons he was at Pôle Espoirs before one season at Saint Gratien, where he made his senior debut in the French third tier at the age of 16.

A week before his 17th birthday he won U-18 European Championship, and a year later he won the U17 World Championship.

=== Senior debut ===
He made the jump to the handball elite at the age of 17 and in the 2015–16 season he made his debut with Tremblay. In his first season in the LNH, Mem scored 93 goals in 25 games.

=== Fc Barcelona ===
In 2016 Mem signed with Spanish champions FC Barcelona on a six year deal. This makes him the youngest first team player, FC Barcelona has ever signed. There, he has won the Liga ASOBAL, Copa ASOBAL and Copa del Rey de Balonmano treble for seven consecutive seasons. In his second season he was named as best young player in the world by Handball Planet. Already in 2018 he extended his contract to 2024.

In 2019 won the IHF Super Globe, beating German club THW Kiel 34:32 in the final.

In May 2022 he extended his contract until 2027. A month later he won the 2021–22 EHF Champions League beating Polish Vive Kielce on penalties. Mem was in the Champions League all star team for the tournament.

From the 2023/24 season he became the team captain of Barcelona. The same season he was named best right back in the world at the 2024 EHF Excellence Awards.

=== National team ===
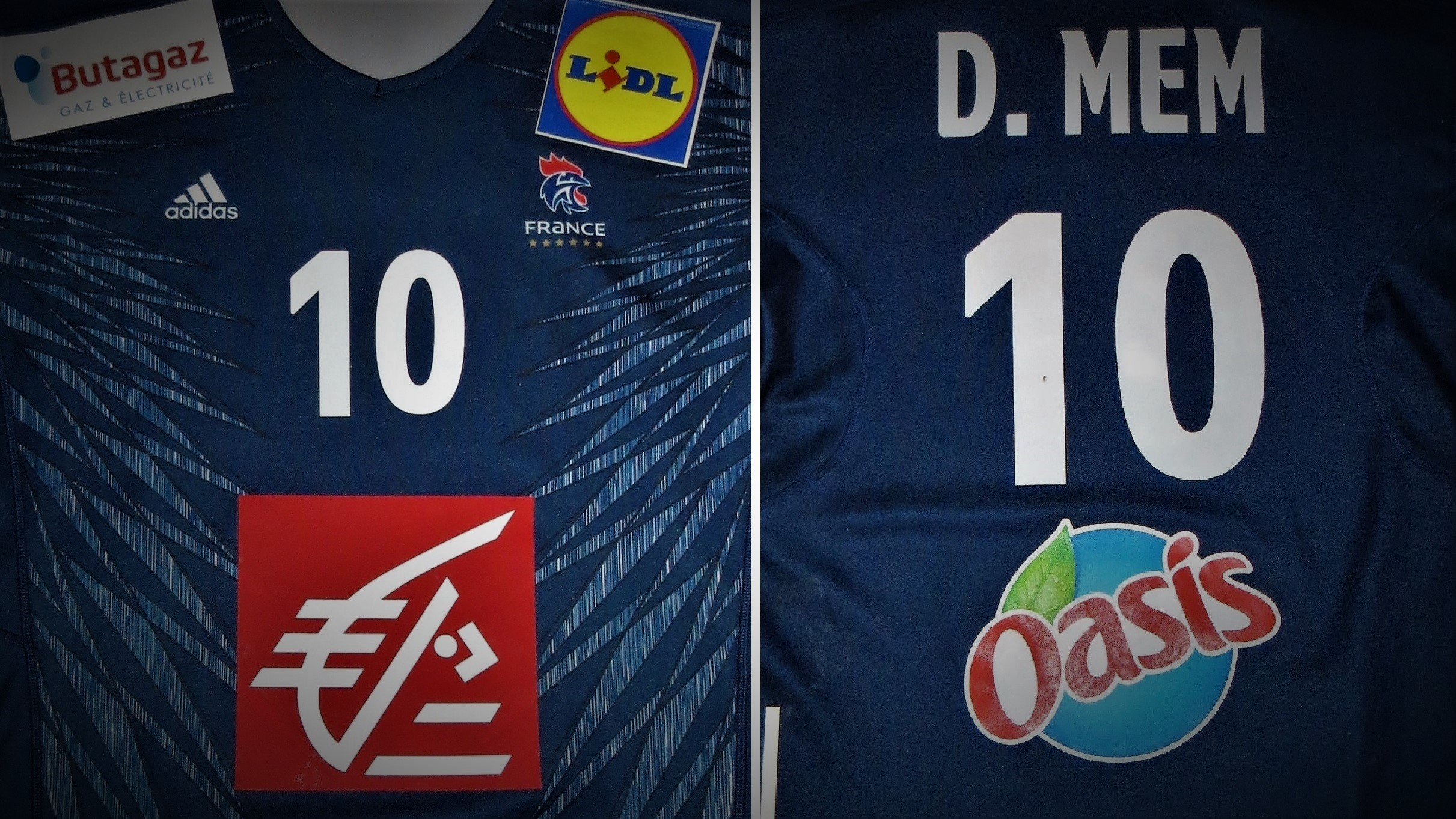

At the age of 19 he was on the France squad at the 2017 World Men's Handball Championship, that won a gold medal. He won an additional gold medal with the French national team at the 2020 Olympics. In 2024 he completed the set when he won a gold medal at the 2024 European Championship.

At the 2025 World Championship he won bronze medals with France, losing to Croatia in the semifinal and beating Portugal in the third place playoff.

== Personal life ==
Two of his brothers are basketball players in the Ligue Nationale de Basket. He was born to a Cameroonian father and a Réunionese mother.

== Honours ==
=== Club ===
- EHF Champions League
  - Winner: 2021, 2022, 2024
  - Second place: 2020
- Super Globe
  - Winner: 2017, 2018, 2019
  - Second place: 2021, 2022
  - Third place: 2023
- Liga ASOBAL 2017, 2018, 2019, 2020, 2021, 2022, 2023, 2024
- Copa ASOBAL 2017, 2018, 2019, 2020, 2021, 2022, 2023, 2024
- Spanish Super Cup (Supercopa de España de Balonmano) 2016, 2017, 2018, 2019, 2020, 2021
- Catalan Super Cup 2016, 2017, 2018, 2019, 2020, 2021, 2022, 2023
- Copa del Rey 2017, 2018, 2019, 2020, 2021, 2022, 2023, 2024
- Iberian Super Cup 2022 and 2023

=== Individual awards ===
- All-Star Right Back of EHF Champions League: 2021, 2022
- Best right back at the 2023/24 EHF Excellence Awards
- Best young player in the world 2017/2018
- Liga ASOBAL all star team (right back): 2019, 2020, 2021, 2022, 2024
