= Karl Wallinius =

Swedish handball player (born 1999)

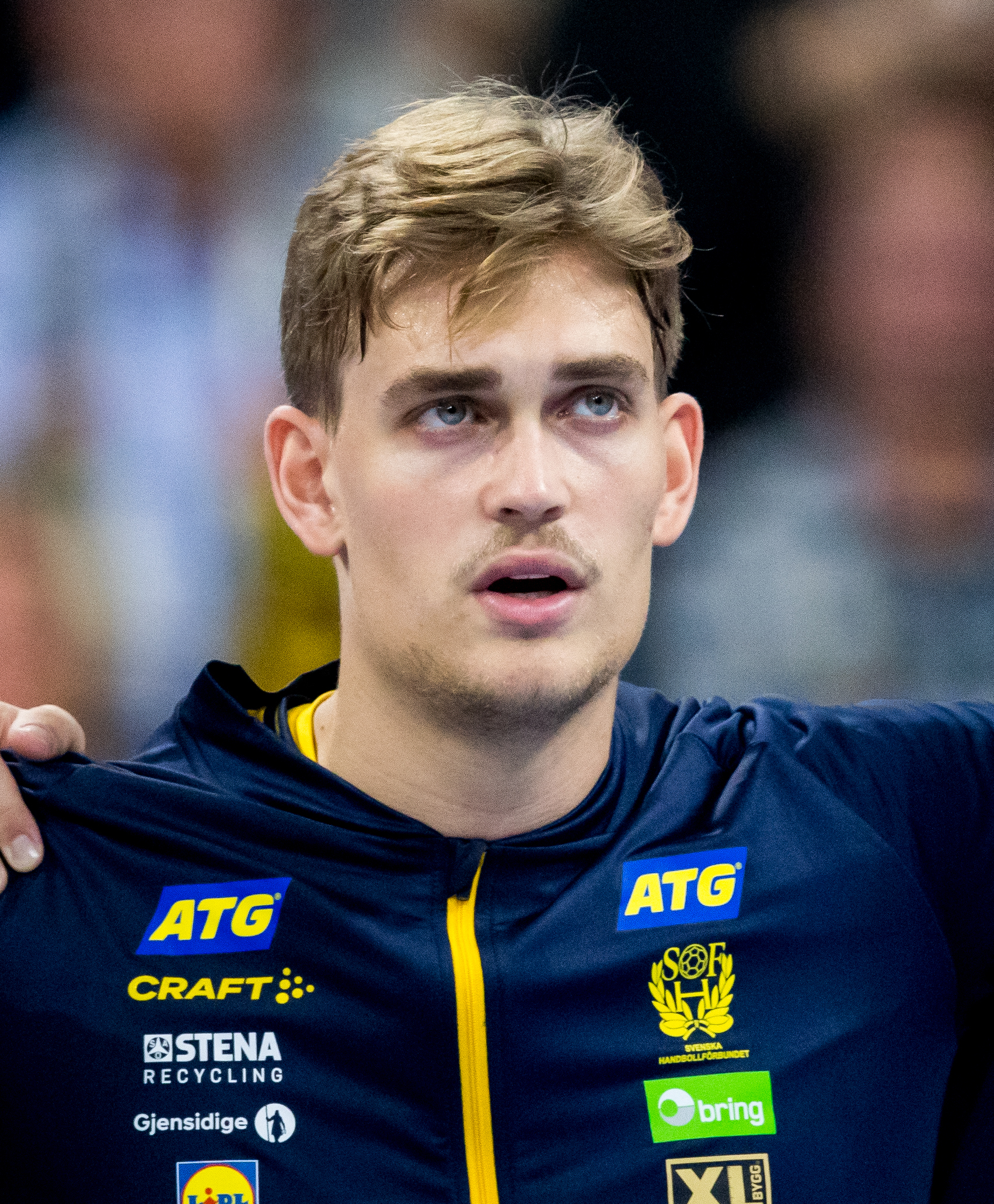
- Wallinius in 2022

Personal information
- Full name: Karl Erik Edvin Wallinius
- Nationality: Swedish
- Born: 14 January 1999 (age 27) Lund, Sweden
- Height: 1.99 m (6 ft 6 in)

Sport
- Sport: Handball
- Position: Left back
- Current club: Ribe-Esbjerg HH
- Number: 49

Youth career
- Years: Team
- –2016: Lugi HF

Senior clubs
- Years: Team
- 2016–2021: Lugi HF
- 2021–2022: Montpellier Handball
- 2022–2024: THW Kiel
- 2024–: Ribe-Esbjerg HH
National team
Years	Team	Apps	(Gls)
2021–	Sweden	36	(41)
Medal record
European Championship
Gold medal – first place	2022 Hungary/Slovakia
Bronze medal – third place	2024 Germany
- Updated on 7 November 2024

Karl Erik Edvin Wallinius (born 14 January 1999) is a Swedish professional handball player for Ribe-Esbjerg HH and the Swedish national team.

== Career ==
Wallinius started his career at Lugi HF where he played until 2021. His breakthrough year was the 2019-2020, where he scored 131 goals for the club. In 2021 he signed for French team Montpellier HB.

After a single season at Montpellier he joined German THW Kiel on a 5 year deal. Here he won the German Bundesliga in 2023 and the German Supercup in 2022 and 2023. In November 2024 he left Kiel for Danish club

=== National team ===
In October 2021 he became a part of the national team. He debuted for the team in November 2021 against Poland. In 2022 he played at his first major international tournament, when he was part of the team that won the 2022 European Championship.

At the 2023 World Men's Handball Championship he was initially part of the Swedish squad, but he had to withdraw due to knee injuries. He was replaced by Olle Forsell Schefvert.

== Achievements ==
- Handball-Bundesliga
  - Gold: 2023
- DHB-Supercup
  - Gold: 2022, 2023
