= Aleix Gómez =

Spanish handball player (born 1997)

Personal information
- Full name: Aleix Gómez Abelló
- Nationality: Spanish
- Born: 7 May 1997 (age 29) Sabadell, Spain
- Height: 1.80 m (5 ft 11 in)

Sport
- Sport: Handball
- Position: Right wing
- Current club: FC Barcelona Handbol
- Number: 20

Youth career
- Years: Team
- –2009: OAR Gracia Sabadell
- 2009–2017: FC Barcelona

Senior clubs
- Years: Team
- 2017–: FC Barcelona
National team
| Years | Team | Apps | (Gls) |
| 2017– | Spain | 35 | (106) |
Medal record
Olympic Games
| Bronze medal – third place | 2020 Tokyo | Team |
| Bronze medal – third place | 2024 Paris | Team |
World Championship
| Bronze medal – third place | 2021 Egypt |
European Championship
| Gold medal – first place | 2020 Sweden/Austria/Norway |
| Silver medal – second place | 2022 Hungary/Slovakia |
Mediterranean Games
| Bronze medal – third place | 2018 Tarragona | Team |

Aleix Gómez Abelló (Note: In this Spanish name, the first or paternal surname is Gómez and the second or maternal family name is Abelló.) (born 7 May 1997) is a Spanish professional handball player for FC Barcelona and the Spain national team.

He participated at the 2019 World Men's Handball Championship.

== International honours ==
- EHF Champions League:
  - Winner: 2021, 2022, 2024, 2026
  - Silver medal: 2020
  - Bronze medal: 2019, 2023
- IHF Super Globe:
  - Winner: 2017, 2018, 2019, 2025
  - Silver medal: 2022
  - Bronze medal: 2023
- Junior World Championship:
  - Gold Medalist: 2017
- Junior European Championship:
  - Gold Medalist: 2016

== Individual awards ==
- All-Star Right Wing at the Olympic Games: 2020
- All-Star Right Wing of the European Championship: 2022
- All-Star Right Wing of EHF Champions League: 2021, 2022
- Top Goalscorer of EHF Champions League: 2022 (104 goals)
- Best Young Player of EHF Champions League: 2020
- All-Star Right Wing of the Junior World Championship: 2017
