= Arkadiusz Moryto =

Polish handball player (born 1997)

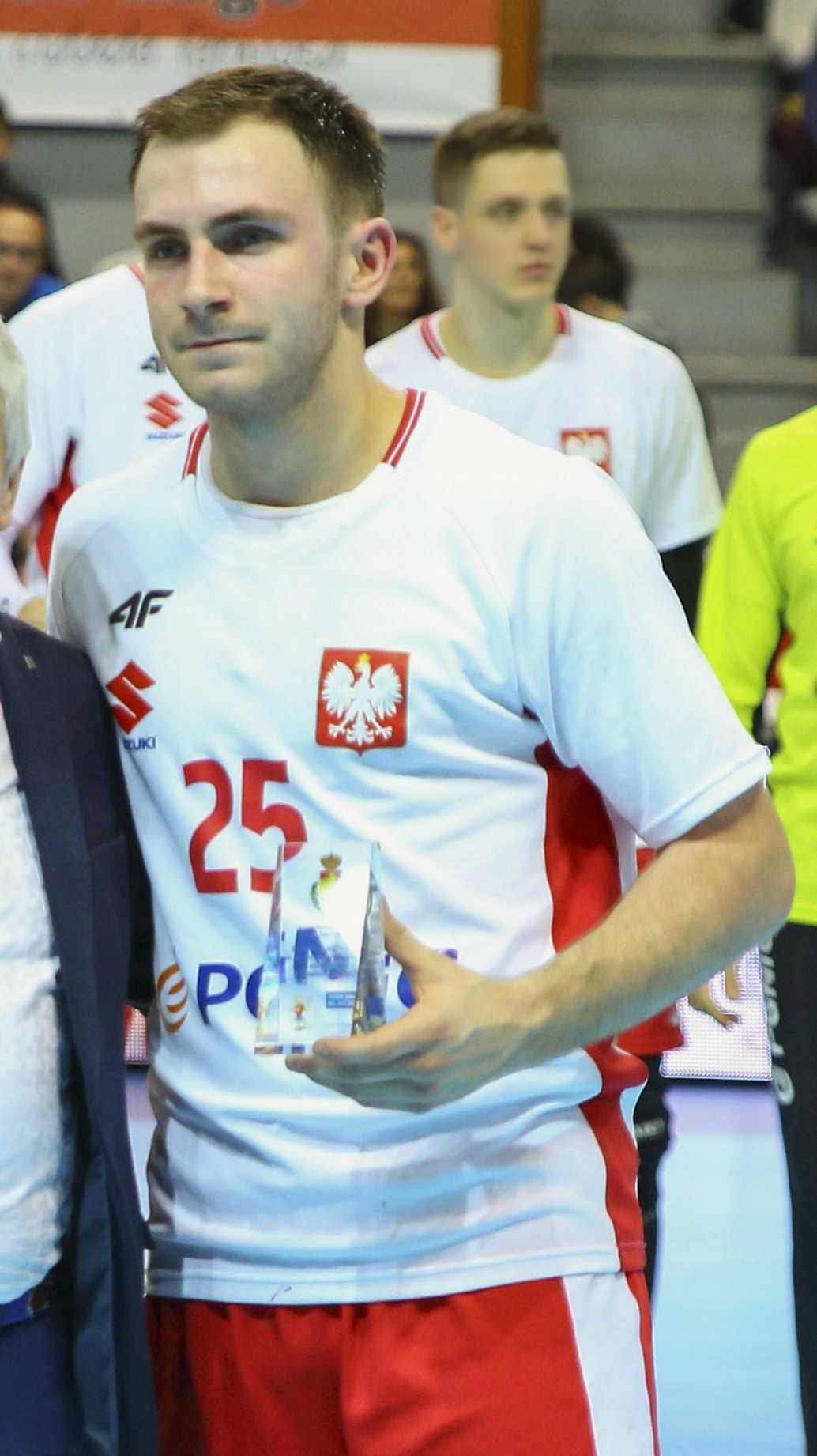

Personal information
- Nationality: Polish
- Born: 31 August 1997 (age 29) Kraków, Poland
- Height: 1.80 m (5 ft 11 in)

Sport
- Sport: Handball
- Position: Right wing
- Current club: Industria Kielce
- Number: 23

Youth career
- Years: Team
- –2013: Kusy Kraków
- 2013–2014: SMS Gdańsk

Senior clubs
- Years: Team
- 2014–2016: SMS Gdańsk
- 2016–2018: Zagłębie Lubin
- 2018–: Industria Kielce
National team
Years	Team	Apps	(Gls)
2017–	Poland	108	(510)
- Updated on 12 January 2026

Arkadiusz Moryto (born 31 August 1997) is a Polish handball player for Industria Kielce and the Polish national team.

He participated at the 2017 World Men's Handball Championship, as well as in the 2020 and 2022 European Men's Handball Championship.
