= Artsem Karalek =

Belarusian handball player

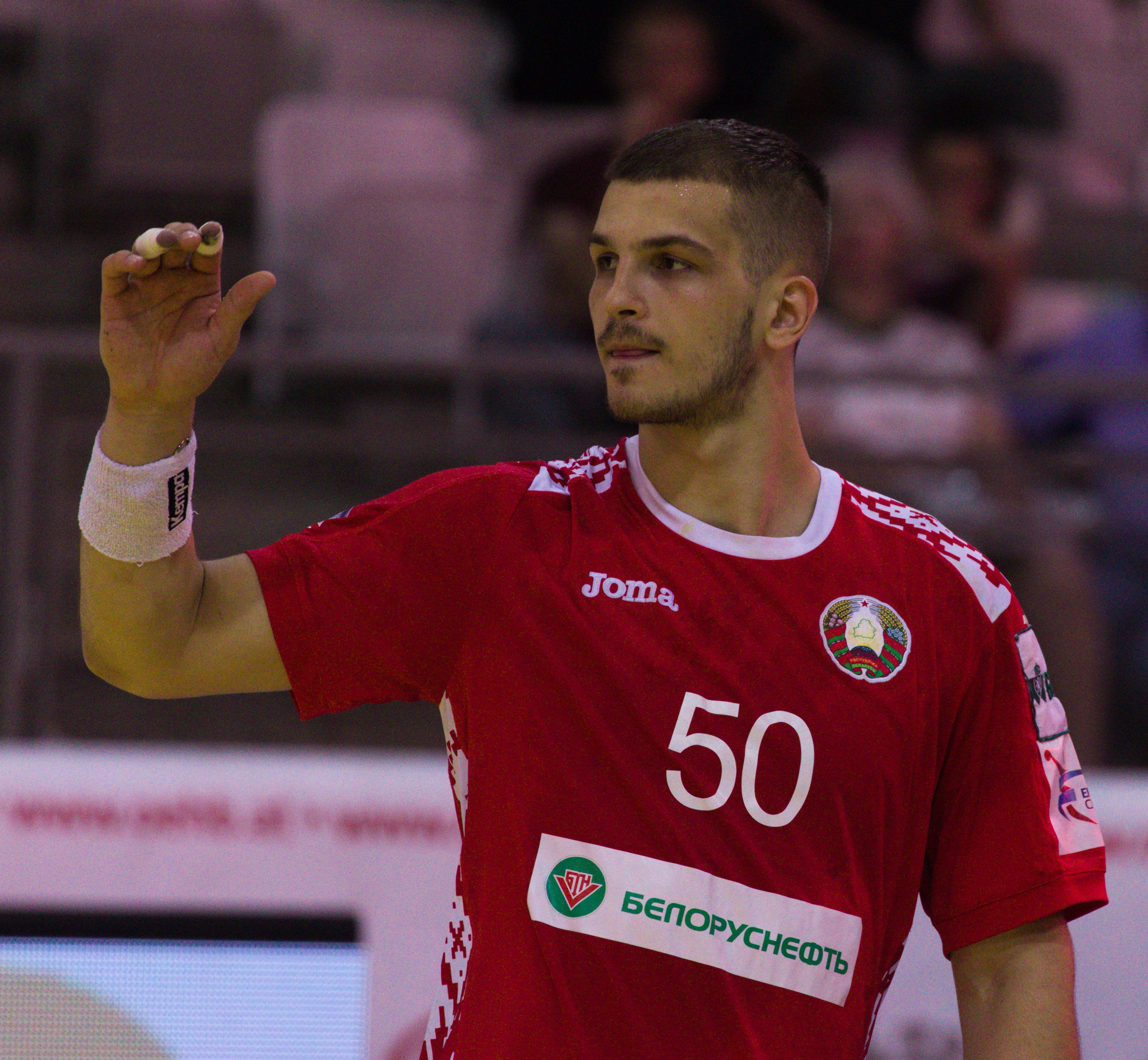

Personal information
- Nationality: Belarusian
- Born: 20 February 1996 (age 30) Hrodna, Belarus
- Height: 1.96 m (6 ft 5 in)

Sport
- Sport: Handball
- Position: Pivot
- Current club: Industria Kielce
- Number: 50

Senior clubs
- Years: Team
- –2014: Kronon Hrodna
- 2014–2016: SKA Minsk
- 2016–2018: Saint-Raphaël Var
- 2018–: Industria Kielce
National team
Years	Team	Apps	(Gls)
2013–	Belarus	72	(276)

Artsem Mikhailavich Karalek (Belarusian: Арцём Міхайлавіч Каралёк; born 20 February 1996) is a Belarusian handball player for Industria Kielce and the Belarusian national team.

He competed both at the 2016 European Men's Handball Championship and the 2020 European Men's Handball Championship.
