= 2018–19 EHF Champions League group stage =

The 2018–19 EHF Champions League group stage began on 12 September 2018 and concluded on 3 March 2019. A total of 28 teams competed for 14 places in the knockout stage of the 2018–19 EHF Champions League.

== Draw ==
The draw for the group stage was held on 29 June 2018.

=== Seedings ===
The seedings were announced on 20 June 2018.

Seeding pots for Groups A and B
Pot 1	Pot 2	Pot 3	Pot 4
(France) Paris Saint-Germain (North Macedonia) Vardar	(Poland) PGE Vive Kielce (Hungary) MOL-Pick Szeged	(Germany) Flensburg-Handewitt (Spain) Barça Lassa	(Denmark) Skjern Håndbold (Belarus) Meshkov Brest
Pot 5	Pot 6	Pot 7	Pot 8
(Croatia) PPD Zagreb (Hungary) Telekom Veszprém	(Ukraine) Motor Zaporizhzhia (France) Montpellier	(Sweden) IFK Kristianstad (Slovenia) Celje Pivovarna Laško	(Germany) Rhein-Neckar Löwen (France) HBC Nantes

Seeding pots for Groups C and D
Pot 1	Pot 2	Pot 3
(North Macedonia) Metalurg Skopje (Poland) Wisła Płock	(Spain) Ademar León (Denmark) Bjerringbro-Silkeborg	(Portugal) Sporting CP (Norway) Elverum Håndball
Pot 4	Pot 5	Pot 6
(Turkey) Beşiktaş (Switzerland) Wacker Thun	(Russia) Chekhovskiye Medvedi (Romania) Dinamo București	(Slovakia) Tatran Prešov (Finland) Riihimäki Cocks

== Format ==
In each group, teams played against each other in a double round-robin format, with home and away matches. After completion of the group stage matches, the teams advancing to the knockout stage were determined in the following manner:

- Groups A and B – the top team qualified directly for the quarter-finals, and the five teams ranked 2nd–6th advanced to the first knockout round.
- Groups C and D – the top two teams from both groups contested a playoff to determine the last two sides joining the ten teams from Groups A and B in the first knockout round.

== Tiebreakers ==
In the group stage, teams were ranked according to points (2 points for a win, 1 point for a draw, 0 points for a loss). After completion of the group stage, if two or more teams had the same number of points, the ranking was determined as follows:

1. Highest number of points in matches between the teams directly involved;
2. Superior goal difference in matches between the teams directly involved;
3. Highest number of goals scored in matches between the teams directly involved (or in the away match in case of a two-team tie);
4. Superior goal difference in all matches of the group;
5. Highest number of plus goals in all matches of the group;

If the ranking of one of these teams is determined, the above criteria are consecutively followed until the ranking of all teams is determined. If no ranking can be determined, a decision shall be obtained by EHF through drawing of lots.

== Groups ==
The matchdays were 12–16 September, 19–23 September, 26–30 September, 3–7 October, 10–14 October, 1–4 November, 7–11 November, 14–18 November, 21–25 November, 28 November–2 December 2018. For Groups A and B, additional matchdays included, 6–10 February, 13–17 February, 20–24 February and 27 February–3 March 2019.

=== Group A ===
Pos	Team	Pld	W	D	L	GF	GA	GD	Pts	Qualification
1	(Spain) Barça Lassa	14	12	0	2	486	391	+95	24	Quarterfinals
2	(Hungary) Telekom Veszprém	14	10	0	4	410	382	+28	20	First knockout round
3	(North Macedonia) RK Vardar	14	9	1	4	406	390	+16	19	First knockout round
4	(Poland) PGE Vive Kielce	14	7	0	7	439	430	+9	14 (Note: Vive Kielce 64–62 Rhein-Neckar Löwen)	First knockout round
5	(Germany) Rhein-Neckar Löwen	14	7	0	7	418	410	+8	14	First knockout round
6	(Belarus) Meshkov Brest	14	4	1	9	379	419	−40	9	First knockout round
7	(France) Montpellier	14	3	1	10	377	414	−37	7	
8	(Sweden) IFK Kristianstad	14	2	1	11	396	475	−79	5	

Source: EHF
Notes:

12 September 2018; 19:00	Rhein-Neckar Löwen (Germany)	35–34	(Spain) Barça Lassa	SAP Arena, Mannheim; Attendance: 6,018; Referees: Nikolov, Nachevski (MKD)
12 September 2018; 19:00	Sigurðsson 6	(16–13)	Gómez 11	SAP Arena, Mannheim; Attendance: 6,018; Referees: Nikolov, Nachevski (MKD)
12 September 2018; 19:00	4× (yellow card) 3× (suspension)	Report	3× (yellow card) 1× (suspension)	SAP Arena, Mannheim; Attendance: 6,018; Referees: Nikolov, Nachevski (MKD)

15 September 2018; 17:30	Montpellier (France)	24–27	(North Macedonia) Vardar	Palais des sports René-Bougnol, Montpellier; Attendance: 3,000; Referees: Baďura, Ondogrecula (SVK)
15 September 2018; 17:30	Kavtičnik 6	(11–12)	Borozan 8	Palais des sports René-Bougnol, Montpellier; Attendance: 3,000; Referees: Baďura, Ondogrecula (SVK)
15 September 2018; 17:30	2× (yellow card) 3× (suspension)	Report	3× (yellow card) 4× (suspension)	Palais des sports René-Bougnol, Montpellier; Attendance: 3,000; Referees: Baďura, Ondogrecula (SVK)

15 September 2018; 18:00	Telekom Veszprém (Hungary)	29–27	(Poland) PGE Vive Kielce	Veszprém Aréna, Veszprém; Attendance: 5,019; Referees: Gousko, Repkin (BLR)
15 September 2018; 18:00	Gajić 6	(14–13)	Dujshebaev 10	Veszprém Aréna, Veszprém; Attendance: 5,019; Referees: Gousko, Repkin (BLR)
15 September 2018; 18:00	3× (yellow card) 5× (suspension) 1× (red card)	Report	2× (yellow card) 3× (suspension)	Veszprém Aréna, Veszprém; Attendance: 5,019; Referees: Gousko, Repkin (BLR)

15 September 2018; 19:30	IFK Kristianstad (Sweden)	30–32	(Belarus) Meshkov Brest	Kristianstad Arena, Kristianstad; Attendance: 3,368; Referees: Marín, García (ESP)
15 September 2018; 19:30	Henningsson 7	(16–14)	Obranović 7	Kristianstad Arena, Kristianstad; Attendance: 3,368; Referees: Marín, García (ESP)
15 September 2018; 19:30	2× (yellow card) 1× (suspension)	Report	1× (yellow card) 6× (suspension)	Kristianstad Arena, Kristianstad; Attendance: 3,368; Referees: Marín, García (ESP)

22 September 2018; 17:30	Vardar (North Macedonia)	33–25	(Sweden) IFK Kristianstad	Jane Sandanski Arena, Skopje; Attendance: 3,500; Referees: Brunner, Salah (SUI)
22 September 2018; 17:30	Čupić 7	(19–10)	Nyfjäll 5	Jane Sandanski Arena, Skopje; Attendance: 3,500; Referees: Brunner, Salah (SUI)
22 September 2018; 17:30	2× (yellow card) 2× (suspension)	Report	3× (yellow card) 6× (suspension)	Jane Sandanski Arena, Skopje; Attendance: 3,500; Referees: Brunner, Salah (SUI)

22 September 2018; 18:00	PGE Vive Kielce (Poland)	35–32	(Germany) Rhein-Neckar Löwen	Hala Legionów, Kielce; Attendance: 4,000; Referees: Santos, Fonseca (POR)
22 September 2018; 18:00	Cindrić, Dujshebaev 5	(17–17)	Schmid 9	Hala Legionów, Kielce; Attendance: 4,000; Referees: Santos, Fonseca (POR)
22 September 2018; 18:00	1× (yellow card) 2× (suspension)	Report	2× (yellow card) 5× (suspension)	Hala Legionów, Kielce; Attendance: 4,000; Referees: Santos, Fonseca (POR)

22 September 2018; 18:00	Barça Lassa (Spain)	31–28	(Hungary) Telekom Veszprém	Palau Blaugrana, Barcelona; Attendance: 2,828; Referees: Gjeding, Hansen (DEN)
22 September 2018; 18:00	Mortensen 7	(17–14)	Gajić 8	Palau Blaugrana, Barcelona; Attendance: 2,828; Referees: Gjeding, Hansen (DEN)
22 September 2018; 18:00	2× (yellow card) 6× (suspension) 1× (red card)	Report	2× (yellow card) 8× (suspension)	Palau Blaugrana, Barcelona; Attendance: 2,828; Referees: Gjeding, Hansen (DEN)

22 September 2018; 18:30	Meshkov Brest (Belarus)	26–23	(France) Montpellier	Sportshall Victoria, Brest; Attendance: 3,500; Referees: Jurinović, Mrvica (CRO)
22 September 2018; 18:30	three players 4	(13–10)	Porte 6	Sportshall Victoria, Brest; Attendance: 3,500; Referees: Jurinović, Mrvica (CRO)
22 September 2018; 18:30	2× (yellow card) 2× (suspension)	Report	3× (yellow card) 1× (suspension)	Sportshall Victoria, Brest; Attendance: 3,500; Referees: Jurinović, Mrvica (CRO)

26 September 2018; 19:00	Rhein-Neckar Löwen (Germany)	33–27	(Belarus) Meshkov Brest	SAP Arena, Mannheim; Attendance: 2,365; Referees: Lah, Sok (SLO)
26 September 2018; 19:00	Sigurðsson 6	(18–13)	Ivić, Shkurinskiy 7	SAP Arena, Mannheim; Attendance: 2,365; Referees: Lah, Sok (SLO)
26 September 2018; 19:00	2× (yellow card) 2× (suspension)	Report	2× (yellow card) 3× (suspension)	SAP Arena, Mannheim; Attendance: 2,365; Referees: Lah, Sok (SLO)

29 September 2018; 17:30	Telekom Veszprém (Hungary)	25–27	(North Macedonia) Vardar	Veszprém Aréna, Veszprém; Attendance: 5,019; Referees: Geipel, Helbig (GER)
29 September 2018; 17:30	Gajić 5	(11–13)	three players 5	Veszprém Aréna, Veszprém; Attendance: 5,019; Referees: Geipel, Helbig (GER)
29 September 2018; 17:30	3× (yellow card) 8× (suspension)	Report	2× (yellow card) 1× (suspension)	Veszprém Aréna, Veszprém; Attendance: 5,019; Referees: Geipel, Helbig (GER)

29 September 2018; 19:30	IFK Kristianstad (Sweden)	25–44	(Spain) Barça Lassa	Kristianstad Arena, Kristianstad; Attendance: 4,200; Referees: Jørum, Kleven (NOR)
29 September 2018; 19:30	Nilsen 6	(14–19)	Dolenec 7	Kristianstad Arena, Kristianstad; Attendance: 4,200; Referees: Jørum, Kleven (NOR)
29 September 2018; 19:30	2× (yellow card) 3× (suspension)	Report	3× (suspension)	Kristianstad Arena, Kristianstad; Attendance: 4,200; Referees: Jørum, Kleven (NOR)

30 September 2018; 19:00	Montpellier (France)	26–29	(Poland) PGE Vive Kielce	Sud de France Arena, Montpellier; Attendance: 4,812; Referees: Horáček, Novotný (CZE)
30 September 2018; 19:00	Richardson 6	(14–16)	Dujshebaev 9	Sud de France Arena, Montpellier; Attendance: 4,812; Referees: Horáček, Novotný (CZE)
30 September 2018; 19:00	3× (yellow card) 5× (suspension)	Report	1× (yellow card) 4× (suspension)	Sud de France Arena, Montpellier; Attendance: 4,812; Referees: Horáček, Novotný (CZE)

6 October 2018; 15:00	Meshkov Brest (Belarus)	28–29	(Hungary) Telekom Veszprém	Sportshall Victoria, Brest; Attendance: 3,300; Referees: Caçador, Nicolau (POR)
6 October 2018; 15:00	Ðukić 5	(16–15)	Štrlek 6	Sportshall Victoria, Brest; Attendance: 3,300; Referees: Caçador, Nicolau (POR)
6 October 2018; 15:00	3× (yellow card) 4× (suspension)	Report	2× (yellow card) 5× (suspension) 1× (red card)	Sportshall Victoria, Brest; Attendance: 3,300; Referees: Caçador, Nicolau (POR)

6 October 2018; 16:00	PGE Vive Kielce (Poland)	33–31	(Sweden) IFK Kristianstad	Hala Legionów, Kielce; Attendance: 3,500; Referees: Brkic, Jusufhodzic (AUT)
6 October 2018; 16:00	Moryto 7	(17–12)	Guðmundsson 7	Hala Legionów, Kielce; Attendance: 3,500; Referees: Brkic, Jusufhodzic (AUT)
6 October 2018; 16:00	1× (yellow card) 2× (suspension)	Report	3× (yellow card) 4× (suspension)	Hala Legionów, Kielce; Attendance: 3,500; Referees: Brkic, Jusufhodzic (AUT)

6 October 2018; 16:00	Barça Lassa (Spain)	35–27	(France) Montpellier	Palau Blaugrana, Barcelona; Attendance: 2,642; Referees: Elíasson, Pálsson (ISL)
6 October 2018; 16:00	Mortensen 7	(18–13)	Villeminot 6	Palau Blaugrana, Barcelona; Attendance: 2,642; Referees: Elíasson, Pálsson (ISL)
6 October 2018; 16:00	1× (yellow card) 4× (suspension)	Report	2× (yellow card) 3× (suspension)	Palau Blaugrana, Barcelona; Attendance: 2,642; Referees: Elíasson, Pálsson (ISL)

6 October 2018; 17:30	Vardar (North Macedonia)	29–27	(Germany) Rhein-Neckar Löwen	Jane Sandanski Arena, Skopje; Attendance: 5,500; Referees: Nikolić, Stojković (SRB)
6 October 2018; 17:30	Dibirov 8	(13–15)	Petersson 7	Jane Sandanski Arena, Skopje; Attendance: 5,500; Referees: Nikolić, Stojković (SRB)
6 October 2018; 17:30	2× (yellow card) 3× (suspension)	Report	4× (yellow card) 4× (suspension) 1× (red card)	Jane Sandanski Arena, Skopje; Attendance: 5,500; Referees: Nikolić, Stojković (SRB)

10 October 2018; 19:00	Rhein-Neckar Löwen (Germany)	36–27	(Sweden) IFK Kristianstad	SAP Arena, Mannheim; Attendance: 3,082; Referees: Erdoğan, Özdeniz (TUR)
10 October 2018; 19:00	Radivojević 9	(18–14)	Guðmundsson, Nilsen 5	SAP Arena, Mannheim; Attendance: 3,082; Referees: Erdoğan, Özdeniz (TUR)
10 October 2018; 19:00	2× (yellow card) 2× (suspension)	Report	1× (yellow card) 5× (suspension) 2× (red card)	SAP Arena, Mannheim; Attendance: 3,082; Referees: Erdoğan, Özdeniz (TUR)

13 October 2018; 16:00	Meshkov Brest (Belarus)	21–29	(Spain) Barça Lassa	Sportshall Victoria, Brest; Attendance: 3,500; Referees: Pavićević, Ražnatović (MNE)
13 October 2018; 16:00	Obranović 5	(14–15)	three players 5	Sportshall Victoria, Brest; Attendance: 3,500; Referees: Pavićević, Ražnatović (MNE)
13 October 2018; 16:00	3× (yellow card) 4× (suspension)	Report	3× (yellow card) 5× (suspension)	Sportshall Victoria, Brest; Attendance: 3,500; Referees: Pavićević, Ražnatović (MNE)

13 October 2018; 17:30	Montpellier (France)	29–30	(Hungary) Telekom Veszprém	Sud de France Arena, Montpellier; Attendance: 5,000; Referees: Gubica, Milošević (CRO)
13 October 2018; 17:30	Richardson 7	(16–14)	Štrlek 6	Sud de France Arena, Montpellier; Attendance: 5,000; Referees: Gubica, Milošević (CRO)
13 October 2018; 17:30	3× (yellow card) 4× (suspension)	Report	6× (suspension)	Sud de France Arena, Montpellier; Attendance: 5,000; Referees: Gubica, Milošević (CRO)

14 October 2018; 17:00	PGE Vive Kielce (Poland)	31–27	(North Macedonia) Vardar	Hala Legionów, Kielce; Attendance: 4,100; Referees: Mažeika, Gatelis (LTU)
14 October 2018; 17:00	Cindrić 8	(16–15)	Dibirov, Skube 6	Hala Legionów, Kielce; Attendance: 4,100; Referees: Mažeika, Gatelis (LTU)
14 October 2018; 17:00	3× (yellow card) 6× (suspension) 1× (red card)	Report	3× (yellow card) 4× (suspension) 1× (red card)	Hala Legionów, Kielce; Attendance: 4,100; Referees: Mažeika, Gatelis (LTU)

3 November 2018; 17:30	Vardar (North Macedonia)	30–23	(Belarus) Meshkov Brest	Jane Sandanski Arena, Skopje; Attendance: 4,500; Referees: Horáček, Novotný (CZE)
3 November 2018; 17:30	Karačić 11	(14–14)	Shkurinskiy 5	Jane Sandanski Arena, Skopje; Attendance: 4,500; Referees: Horáček, Novotný (CZE)
3 November 2018; 17:30	3× (yellow card) 3× (suspension)	Report	3× (yellow card) 3× (suspension)	Jane Sandanski Arena, Skopje; Attendance: 4,500; Referees: Horáček, Novotný (CZE)

3 November 2018; 17:30	Telekom Veszprém (Hungary)	28–29	(Germany) Rhein-Neckar Löwen	Veszprém Aréna, Veszprém; Attendance: 5,000; Referees: Baďura, Ondogrecula (SVK)
3 November 2018; 17:30	Mahé 5	(12–15)	three players 6	Veszprém Aréna, Veszprém; Attendance: 5,000; Referees: Baďura, Ondogrecula (SVK)
3 November 2018; 17:30	3× (yellow card) 1× (suspension)	Report	2× (suspension)	Veszprém Aréna, Veszprém; Attendance: 5,000; Referees: Baďura, Ondogrecula (SVK)

3 November 2018; 19:30	IFK Kristianstad (Sweden)	29–29	(France) Montpellier	Kristianstad Arena, Kristianstad; Attendance: 3,848; Referees: Nikolić, Stojković (SRB)
3 November 2018; 19:30	Halén 6	(12–17)	Richardson 7	Kristianstad Arena, Kristianstad; Attendance: 3,848; Referees: Nikolić, Stojković (SRB)
3 November 2018; 19:30	2× (yellow card) 1× (suspension)	Report	4× (yellow card) 3× (suspension)	Kristianstad Arena, Kristianstad; Attendance: 3,848; Referees: Nikolić, Stojković (SRB)

4 November 2018; 19:00	Barça Lassa (Spain)	31–27	(Poland) PGE Vive Kielce	Palau Blaugrana, Barcelona; Attendance: 3,239; Referees: Jurinović, Mrvica (CRO)
4 November 2018; 19:00	Gómez 7	(14–11)	Dujshebaev 6	Palau Blaugrana, Barcelona; Attendance: 3,239; Referees: Jurinović, Mrvica (CRO)
4 November 2018; 19:00	2× (yellow card) 1× (suspension)	Report	2× (yellow card) 1× (suspension)	Palau Blaugrana, Barcelona; Attendance: 3,239; Referees: Jurinović, Mrvica (CRO)

7 November 2018; 19:00	Rhein-Neckar Löwen (Germany)	37–27	(France) Montpellier	SAP Arena, Mannheim; Attendance: 3,285; Referees: Madsen, Mortensen (DEN)
7 November 2018; 19:00	Sigurðsson 11	(16–13)	Richardson 10	SAP Arena, Mannheim; Attendance: 3,285; Referees: Madsen, Mortensen (DEN)
7 November 2018; 19:00	2× (yellow card) 3× (suspension)	Report	1× (yellow card) 2× (suspension)	SAP Arena, Mannheim; Attendance: 3,285; Referees: Madsen, Mortensen (DEN)

10 November 2018; 15:00	Meshkov Brest (Belarus)	26–35	(Poland) PGE Vive Kielce	Sportshall Victoria, Brest; Attendance: 3,250; Referees: Brunovský, Čanda (SVK)
10 November 2018; 15:00	Kulak, Selvasiuk 4	(13–15)	Janc 8	Sportshall Victoria, Brest; Attendance: 3,250; Referees: Brunovský, Čanda (SVK)
10 November 2018; 15:00	3× (yellow card) 3× (suspension) 1× (red card)	Report	3× (yellow card) 4× (suspension)	Sportshall Victoria, Brest; Attendance: 3,250; Referees: Brunovský, Čanda (SVK)

10 November 2018; 19:30	IFK Kristianstad (Sweden)	32–29	(Hungary) Telekom Veszprém	Kristianstad Arena, Kristianstad; Attendance: 3,786; Referees: Lah, Sok (SLO)
10 November 2018; 19:30	Guðmundsson 7	(14–15)	Mahé 4	Kristianstad Arena, Kristianstad; Attendance: 3,786; Referees: Lah, Sok (SLO)
10 November 2018; 19:30	3× (yellow card) 6× (suspension)	Report	2× (yellow card) 3× (suspension)	Kristianstad Arena, Kristianstad; Attendance: 3,786; Referees: Lah, Sok (SLO)

11 November 2018; 17:00	Vardar (North Macedonia)	26–30	(Spain) Barça Lassa	Jane Sandanski Arena, Skopje; Attendance: 5,500; Referees: Santos, Fonseca (POR)
11 November 2018; 17:00	Dibirov 6	(9–13)	Mem 8	Jane Sandanski Arena, Skopje; Attendance: 5,500; Referees: Santos, Fonseca (POR)
11 November 2018; 17:00	1× (yellow card) 2× (suspension)	Report	2× (yellow card) 3× (suspension)	Jane Sandanski Arena, Skopje; Attendance: 5,500; Referees: Santos, Fonseca (POR)

14 November 2018; 20:45	Montpellier (France)	31–26	(Germany) Rhein-Neckar Löwen	Sud de France Arena, Montpellier; Attendance: 3,000; Referees: Pavićević, Ražnatović (MNE)
14 November 2018; 20:45	Guigou, Richardson 7	(16–12)	Tollbring 6	Sud de France Arena, Montpellier; Attendance: 3,000; Referees: Pavićević, Ražnatović (MNE)
14 November 2018; 20:45	1× (yellow card) 3× (suspension)	Report	1× (yellow card) 4× (suspension) 1× (red card)	Sud de France Arena, Montpellier; Attendance: 3,000; Referees: Pavićević, Ražnatović (MNE)

17 November 2018; 17:30	Telekom Veszprém (Hungary)	36–27	(Sweden) IFK Kristianstad	Veszprém Aréna, Veszprém; Attendance: 5,019; Referees: Pavićević, Ražnatović (BIH)
17 November 2018; 17:30	Tønnesen 8	(20–14)	Chrintz 8	Veszprém Aréna, Veszprém; Attendance: 5,019; Referees: Pavićević, Ražnatović (BIH)
17 November 2018; 17:30	2× (yellow card) 6× (suspension)	Report	3× (yellow card) 2× (suspension)	Veszprém Aréna, Veszprém; Attendance: 5,019; Referees: Pavićević, Ražnatović (BIH)

17 November 2018; 18:00	PGE Vive Kielce (Poland)	34–31	(Belarus) Meshkov Brest	Hala Legionów, Kielce; Attendance: 4,100; Referees: Nikolić, Stojković (SRB)
17 November 2018; 18:00	Dujshebaev 10	(17–16)	Shkurinskiy 7	Hala Legionów, Kielce; Attendance: 4,100; Referees: Nikolić, Stojković (SRB)
17 November 2018; 18:00	2× (yellow card) 4× (suspension)	Report	2× (yellow card) 4× (suspension)	Hala Legionów, Kielce; Attendance: 4,100; Referees: Nikolić, Stojković (SRB)

17 November 2018; 19:00	Barça Lassa (Spain)	34–26	(North Macedonia) Vardar	Palau Blaugrana, Barcelona; Attendance: 3,874; Referees: Sondors, Līcis (LAT)
17 November 2018; 19:00	Mortensen 8	(16–15)	Čupić 5	Palau Blaugrana, Barcelona; Attendance: 3,874; Referees: Sondors, Līcis (LAT)
17 November 2018; 19:00	2× (yellow card) 5× (suspension)	Report	2× (yellow card) 7× (suspension)	Palau Blaugrana, Barcelona; Attendance: 3,874; Referees: Sondors, Līcis (LAT)

21 November 2018; 19:00	Rhein-Neckar Löwen (Germany)	25–29	(Hungary) Telekom Veszprém	SAP Arena, Mannheim; Attendance: 3,555; Referees: Jurinović, Mrvica (CRO)
21 November 2018; 19:00	Larsen 6	(13–14)	Mahé 7	SAP Arena, Mannheim; Attendance: 3,555; Referees: Jurinović, Mrvica (CRO)
21 November 2018; 19:00	3× (yellow card) 2× (suspension)	Report	3× (yellow card) 3× (suspension)	SAP Arena, Mannheim; Attendance: 3,555; Referees: Jurinović, Mrvica (CRO)

24 November 2018; 15:00	Meshkov Brest (Belarus)	31–31	(North Macedonia) Vardar	Sportshall Victoria, Brest; Attendance: 3,200; Referees: Gjeding, Hansen (DEN)
24 November 2018; 15:00	Ðukić 7	(14–13)	Krištopāns 8	Sportshall Victoria, Brest; Attendance: 3,200; Referees: Gjeding, Hansen (DEN)
24 November 2018; 15:00	2× (yellow card) 5× (suspension)	Report	1× (yellow card) 5× (suspension) 1× (red card)	Sportshall Victoria, Brest; Attendance: 3,200; Referees: Gjeding, Hansen (DEN)

24 November 2018; 18:00	PGE Vive Kielce (Poland)	36–42	(Spain) Barça Lassa	Hala Legionów, Kielce; Attendance: 4,200; Referees: Pichon, Reveret (FRA)
24 November 2018; 18:00	Kulesh 6	(15–18)	Duarte, Mortensen 9	Hala Legionów, Kielce; Attendance: 4,200; Referees: Pichon, Reveret (FRA)
24 November 2018; 18:00	2× (yellow card) 2× (suspension)	Report	3× (yellow card) 1× (suspension)	Hala Legionów, Kielce; Attendance: 4,200; Referees: Pichon, Reveret (FRA)

25 November 2018; 17:00	Montpellier (France)	30–31	(Sweden) IFK Kristianstad	Palais des sports René-Bougnol, Montpellier; Attendance: 5,200; Referees: Caçador, Nicolau (POR)
25 November 2018; 17:00	Richardson 11	(16–16)	Chrintz, Moen Nilsen 8	Palais des sports René-Bougnol, Montpellier; Attendance: 5,200; Referees: Caçador, Nicolau (POR)
25 November 2018; 17:00	2× (yellow card) 3× (suspension)	Report	2× (yellow card) 5× (suspension)	Palais des sports René-Bougnol, Montpellier; Attendance: 5,200; Referees: Caçador, Nicolau (POR)

1 December 2018; 17:30	Vardar (North Macedonia)	28–27	(Poland) PGE Vive Kielce	Jane Sandanski Arena, Skopje; Attendance: 5,500; Referees: Zotin, Volodkov (RUS)
1 December 2018; 17:30	Krištopāns 6	(14–11)	Dujshebaev 6	Jane Sandanski Arena, Skopje; Attendance: 5,500; Referees: Zotin, Volodkov (RUS)
1 December 2018; 17:30	3× (yellow card) 3× (suspension)	Report	2× (yellow card) 4× (suspension)	Jane Sandanski Arena, Skopje; Attendance: 5,500; Referees: Zotin, Volodkov (RUS)

1 December 2018; 18:30	IFK Kristianstad (Sweden)	27–32	(Germany) Rhein-Neckar Löwen	Kristianstad Arena, Kristianstad; Attendance: 4,326; Referees: Sondors, Līcis (LAT)
1 December 2018; 18:30	Chrintz 6	(13–18)	Schmid 10	Kristianstad Arena, Kristianstad; Attendance: 4,326; Referees: Sondors, Līcis (LAT)
1 December 2018; 18:30	3× (yellow card) 3× (suspension)	Report	3× (yellow card) 4× (suspension)	Kristianstad Arena, Kristianstad; Attendance: 4,326; Referees: Sondors, Līcis (LAT)

2 December 2018; 16:30	Barça Lassa (Spain)	41–32	(Belarus) Meshkov Brest	Palau Blaugrana, Barcelona; Attendance: 3,344; Referees: Erdoğan, Özdeniz (TUR)
2 December 2018; 16:30	N'Guessan, Tomás 6	(22–17)	Ivić 6	Palau Blaugrana, Barcelona; Attendance: 3,344; Referees: Erdoğan, Özdeniz (TUR)
2 December 2018; 16:30	2× (yellow card)	Report	2× (yellow card) 5× (suspension)	Palau Blaugrana, Barcelona; Attendance: 3,344; Referees: Erdoğan, Özdeniz (TUR)

2 December 2018; 19:00	Telekom Veszprém (Hungary)	25–19	(France) Montpellier	Veszprém Aréna, Veszprém; Attendance: 5,019; Referees: Brunner, Salah (SUI)
2 December 2018; 19:00	Nilsson 6	(15–11)	Richardson 9	Veszprém Aréna, Veszprém; Attendance: 5,019; Referees: Brunner, Salah (SUI)
2 December 2018; 19:00	3× (yellow card) 2× (suspension) 1× (red card)	Report	4× (yellow card) 2× (suspension)	Veszprém Aréna, Veszprém; Attendance: 5,019; Referees: Brunner, Salah (SUI)

6 February 2019; 19:00	Rhein-Neckar Löwen (Germany)	27–30	(North Macedonia) Vardar	SAP Arena, Mannheim; Attendance: 4,149; Referees: Pichon, Reveret (FRA)
6 February 2019; 19:00	Schmid 9	(12–16)	Dibirov 7	SAP Arena, Mannheim; Attendance: 4,149; Referees: Pichon, Reveret (FRA)
6 February 2019; 19:00	2× (yellow card) 3× (suspension)	Report	2× (yellow card) 3× (suspension)	SAP Arena, Mannheim; Attendance: 4,149; Referees: Pichon, Reveret (FRA)

9 February 2019; 17:30	Montpellier (France)	29–23	(Belarus) Meshkov Brest	Sud de France Arena, Montpellier; Attendance: 2,900; Referees: Nikolov, Nachevski (MKD)
9 February 2019; 17:30	Richardson 8	(15–11)	Baranau 4	Sud de France Arena, Montpellier; Attendance: 2,900; Referees: Nikolov, Nachevski (MKD)
9 February 2019; 17:30	2× (yellow card) 6× (suspension)	Report	2× (yellow card) 6× (suspension) 1× (red card)	Sud de France Arena, Montpellier; Attendance: 2,900; Referees: Nikolov, Nachevski (MKD)

9 February 2019; 17:30	Telekom Veszprém (Hungary)	29–26	(Spain) Barça Lassa	Veszprém Aréna, Veszprém; Attendance: 5,019; Referees: Kurtagic, Wetterwik (SWE)
9 February 2019; 17:30	four players 4	(15–15)	three players 4	Veszprém Aréna, Veszprém; Attendance: 5,019; Referees: Kurtagic, Wetterwik (SWE)
9 February 2019; 17:30	3× (yellow card) 3× (suspension)	Report	1× (yellow card) 1× (suspension)	Veszprém Aréna, Veszprém; Attendance: 5,019; Referees: Kurtagic, Wetterwik (SWE)

9 February 2019; 19:00	IFK Kristianstad (Sweden)	33–34	(Poland) PGE Vive Kielce	Kristianstad Arena, Kristianstad; Attendance: 3,812; Referees: Gubica, Milošević (CRO)
9 February 2019; 19:00	four players 5	(15–16)	Jurecki 11	Kristianstad Arena, Kristianstad; Attendance: 3,812; Referees: Gubica, Milošević (CRO)
9 February 2019; 19:00	3× (yellow card) 4× (suspension)	Report	1× (yellow card) 2× (suspension)	Kristianstad Arena, Kristianstad; Attendance: 3,812; Referees: Gubica, Milošević (CRO)

16 February 2019; 17:30	Vardar (North Macedonia)	27–29	(Hungary) Telekom Veszprém	Jane Sandanski Arena, Skopje; Attendance: 5,500; Referees: Caçador, Nicolau (POR)
16 February 2019; 17:30	Dissinger 5	(16–11)	Lékai 7	Jane Sandanski Arena, Skopje; Attendance: 5,500; Referees: Caçador, Nicolau (POR)
16 February 2019; 17:30	2× (yellow card) 4× (suspension)	Report	2× (yellow card) 6× (suspension)	Jane Sandanski Arena, Skopje; Attendance: 5,500; Referees: Caçador, Nicolau (POR)

16 February 2019; 17:30	Meshkov Brest (Belarus)	27–24	(Germany) Rhein-Neckar Löwen	Sportshall Victoria, Brest; Attendance: 3,450; Referees: Mažeika, Gatelis (LTU)
16 February 2019; 17:30	Shkurinskiy 8	(15–12)	Schmid, Sigurðsson 5	Sportshall Victoria, Brest; Attendance: 3,450; Referees: Mažeika, Gatelis (LTU)
16 February 2019; 17:30	3× (yellow card) 2× (suspension) 1× (red card)	Report	2× (yellow card) 2× (suspension)	Sportshall Victoria, Brest; Attendance: 3,450; Referees: Mažeika, Gatelis (LTU)

16 February 2019; 18:00	PGE Vive Kielce (Poland)	27–28	(France) Montpellier	Hala Legionów, Kielce; Attendance: 4,000; Referees: Marín, García (ESP)
16 February 2019; 18:00	three players 4	(11–14)	Grébille, Richardson 6	Hala Legionów, Kielce; Attendance: 4,000; Referees: Marín, García (ESP)
16 February 2019; 18:00	3× (yellow card) 1× (suspension)	Report	1× (yellow card) 5× (suspension)	Hala Legionów, Kielce; Attendance: 4,000; Referees: Marín, García (ESP)

17 February 2019; 19:30	Barça Lassa (Spain)	43–26	(Sweden) IFK Kristianstad	Palau Blaugrana, Barcelona; Attendance: 3,479; Referees: Madsen, Mortensen (DEN)
17 February 2019; 19:30	Gómez, Syprzak 6	(21–12)	Halén 5	Palau Blaugrana, Barcelona; Attendance: 3,479; Referees: Madsen, Mortensen (DEN)
17 February 2019; 19:30	1× (yellow card)	Report	2× (yellow card) 4× (suspension)	Palau Blaugrana, Barcelona; Attendance: 3,479; Referees: Madsen, Mortensen (DEN)

20 February 2019; 19:00	Rhein-Neckar Löwen (Germany)	30–29	(Poland) PGE Vive Kielce	SAP Arena, Mannheim; Attendance: 4,067; Referees: Gjeding, Hansen (DEN)
20 February 2019; 19:00	Schmid 8	(18–14)	Aguinagalde 6	SAP Arena, Mannheim; Attendance: 4,067; Referees: Gjeding, Hansen (DEN)
20 February 2019; 19:00	1× (yellow card) 1× (suspension)	Report	1× (yellow card) 2× (suspension)	SAP Arena, Mannheim; Attendance: 4,067; Referees: Gjeding, Hansen (DEN)

23 February 2019; 19:00	IFK Kristianstad (Sweden)	30–32	(North Macedonia) Vardar	Kristianstad Arena, Kristianstad; Attendance: 3,867; Referees: Brunovský, Čanda (SVK)
23 February 2019; 19:00	Guðmundsson 10	(17–16)	Krištopāns 8	Kristianstad Arena, Kristianstad; Attendance: 3,867; Referees: Brunovský, Čanda (SVK)
23 February 2019; 19:00	1× (yellow card) 4× (suspension)	Report	1× (yellow card) 2× (suspension)	Kristianstad Arena, Kristianstad; Attendance: 3,867; Referees: Brunovský, Čanda (SVK)

24 February 2019; 17:00	Telekom Veszprém (Hungary)	28–20	(Belarus) Meshkov Brest	Veszprém Aréna, Veszprém; Attendance: 5,019; Referees: Lah, Sok (SVN)
24 February 2019; 17:00	three players 4	(9–10)	four players 4	Veszprém Aréna, Veszprém; Attendance: 5,019; Referees: Lah, Sok (SVN)
24 February 2019; 17:00	2× (yellow card) 4× (suspension)	Report	4× (yellow card) 2× (suspension)	Veszprém Aréna, Veszprém; Attendance: 5,019; Referees: Lah, Sok (SVN)

24 February 2019; 19:00	Montpellier (France)	28–36	(Spain) Barça Lassa	Sud de France Arena, Montpellier; Attendance: 7,500; Referees: Geipel, Helbig (GER)
24 February 2019; 19:00	Richardson 6	(12–18)	Gómez 8	Sud de France Arena, Montpellier; Attendance: 7,500; Referees: Geipel, Helbig (GER)
24 February 2019; 19:00	1× (yellow card) 3× (suspension)	Report	1× (yellow card) 2× (suspension)	Sud de France Arena, Montpellier; Attendance: 7,500; Referees: Geipel, Helbig (GER)

2 March 2019; 17:30	Vardar (North Macedonia)	33–27	(France) Montpellier	Jane Sandanski Arena, Skopje; Attendance: 5,000; Referees: Erdoğan, Özdeniz (TUR)
2 March 2019; 17:30	Krištopāns 7	(16–13)	Porte 5	Jane Sandanski Arena, Skopje; Attendance: 5,000; Referees: Erdoğan, Özdeniz (TUR)
2 March 2019; 17:30	2× (yellow card) 2× (suspension)	Report	3× (yellow card) 2× (suspension) 1× (red card)	Jane Sandanski Arena, Skopje; Attendance: 5,000; Referees: Erdoğan, Özdeniz (TUR)

2 March 2019; 17:30	Meshkov Brest (Belarus)	32–23	(Sweden) IFK Kristianstad	Sportshall Victoria, Brest; Attendance: 3,450; Referees: Baďura, Ondogrecula (SVK)
2 March 2019; 17:30	Ivić 6	(15–11)	Nilsen 4	Sportshall Victoria, Brest; Attendance: 3,450; Referees: Baďura, Ondogrecula (SVK)
2 March 2019; 17:30	1× (yellow card) 4× (suspension)	Report	1× (yellow card) 3× (suspension)	Sportshall Victoria, Brest; Attendance: 3,450; Referees: Baďura, Ondogrecula (SVK)

2 March 2019; 17:30	PGE Vive Kielce (Poland)	35–36	(Hungary) Telekom Veszprém	Hala Legionów, Kielce; Attendance: 4,200; Referees: Nikolić, Stojković (SRB)
2 March 2019; 17:30	Janc 7	(21–18)	Mahé 8	Hala Legionów, Kielce; Attendance: 4,200; Referees: Nikolić, Stojković (SRB)
2 March 2019; 17:30	1× (yellow card) 1× (suspension)	Report	2× (yellow card) 5× (suspension)	Hala Legionów, Kielce; Attendance: 4,200; Referees: Nikolić, Stojković (SRB)

2 March 2019; 17:30	Barça Lassa (Spain)	30–25	(Germany) Rhein-Neckar Löwen	Palau Blaugrana, Barcelona; Attendance: 3,033; Referees: Andorka, Hucker (HUN)
2 March 2019; 17:30	Andersson, Syprzak 5	(20–12)	Kohlbacher, Taleski 6	Palau Blaugrana, Barcelona; Attendance: 3,033; Referees: Andorka, Hucker (HUN)
2 March 2019; 17:30	1× (yellow card)	Report	2× (yellow card) 2× (suspension)	Palau Blaugrana, Barcelona; Attendance: 3,033; Referees: Andorka, Hucker (HUN)

=== Group B ===
Pos	Team	Pld	W	D	L	GF	GA	GD	Pts	Qualification
1	(France) Paris Saint-Germain	14	13	0	1	455	385	+70	26	Quarterfinals
2	(Hungary) MOL-Pick Szeged	14	9	2	3	411	397	+14	20	First knockout round
3	(Germany) Flensburg-Handewitt	14	7	1	6	378	370	+8	15	First knockout round
4	(France) HBC Nantes	14	5	4	5	421	408	+13	14	First knockout round
5	(Ukraine) Motor Zaporizhzhia	14	5	1	8	389	381	+8	11 (Note: Motor Zaporizhzhia 59–54 Zagreb)	First knockout round
6	(Croatia) PPD Zagreb	14	4	3	7	382	420	−38	11	First knockout round
7	(Denmark) Skjern Håndbold	14	3	2	9	398	439	−41	8	
8	(Slovenia) Celje Pivovarna Laško	14	3	1	10	380	416	−36	7	

Source: EHF
Notes:

12 September 2018; 18:00	Motor Zaporizhzhia (Ukraine)	29–35	(France) Paris Saint-Germain	Yunost Sport Hall, Zaporizhzhia; Attendance: 3,500; Referees: Pavićević, Ražnatović (MNE)
12 September 2018; 18:00	Malasinskas 6	(12–17)	Remili 8	Yunost Sport Hall, Zaporizhzhia; Attendance: 3,500; Referees: Pavićević, Ražnatović (MNE)
12 September 2018; 18:00	1× (yellow card) 4× (suspension)	Report	2× (yellow card) 1× (suspension)	Yunost Sport Hall, Zaporizhzhia; Attendance: 3,500; Referees: Pavićević, Ražnatović (MNE)

16 September 2018; 17:00	Celje Pivovarna Laško (Slovenia)	26–27	(Denmark) Skjern Håndbold	Zlatorog Arena, Celje; Attendance: 3,567; Referees: Pichon, Reveret (FRA)
16 September 2018; 17:00	Ovniček, Razgor 4	(13–12)	Eggert 8	Zlatorog Arena, Celje; Attendance: 3,567; Referees: Pichon, Reveret (FRA)
16 September 2018; 17:00	4× (yellow card) 4× (suspension)	Report	2× (yellow card) 5× (suspension)	Zlatorog Arena, Celje; Attendance: 3,567; Referees: Pichon, Reveret (FRA)

16 September 2018; 19:00	HBC Nantes (France)	31–34	(Germany) Flensburg-Handewitt	Palais des Sports de Beaulieu, Nantes; Attendance: 5,108; Referees: Zotin, Volodkov (RUS)
16 September 2018; 19:00	Rivera 6	(16–18)	Rød 6	Palais des Sports de Beaulieu, Nantes; Attendance: 5,108; Referees: Zotin, Volodkov (RUS)
16 September 2018; 19:00	2× (yellow card) 2× (suspension)	Report	3× (yellow card) 4× (suspension)	Palais des Sports de Beaulieu, Nantes; Attendance: 5,108; Referees: Zotin, Volodkov (RUS)

16 September 2018; 20:00	PPD Zagreb (Croatia)	23–24	(Hungary) MOL-Pick Szeged	Gradski vrt Hall, Osijek; Attendance: 3,251; Referees: Mažeika, Gatelis (LTU)
16 September 2018; 20:00	Horvat 8	(12–9)	Källman 6	Gradski vrt Hall, Osijek; Attendance: 3,251; Referees: Mažeika, Gatelis (LTU)
16 September 2018; 20:00	4× (yellow card) 2× (suspension) 1× (red card)	Report	3× (yellow card) 4× (suspension)	Gradski vrt Hall, Osijek; Attendance: 3,251; Referees: Mažeika, Gatelis (LTU)

19 September 2018; 19:00	Flensburg-Handewitt (Germany)	29–31	(Croatia) PPD Zagreb	Flens-Arena, Flensburg; Attendance: 3,125; Referees: López, Ramírez (ESP)
19 September 2018; 19:00	Hansen 7	(16–16)	Mandić 8	Flens-Arena, Flensburg; Attendance: 3,125; Referees: López, Ramírez (ESP)
19 September 2018; 19:00	3× (yellow card) 3× (suspension)	Report	1× (yellow card) 4× (suspension)	Flens-Arena, Flensburg; Attendance: 3,125; Referees: López, Ramírez (ESP)

23 September 2018; 16:50	Skjern Håndbold (Denmark)	37–33	(Ukraine) Motor Zaporizhzhia	Skjern Bank Arena, Skjern; Attendance: 2,457; Referees: Erdoğan, Özdeniz (TUR)
23 September 2018; 16:50	Myrhol 8	(19–14)	Malašinskas, Paczkowski 7	Skjern Bank Arena, Skjern; Attendance: 2,457; Referees: Erdoğan, Özdeniz (TUR)
23 September 2018; 16:50	1× (yellow card) 9× (suspension)	Report	2× (yellow card) 7× (suspension)	Skjern Bank Arena, Skjern; Attendance: 2,457; Referees: Erdoğan, Özdeniz (TUR)

23 September 2018; 17:00	Paris Saint-Germain (France)	33–21	(Slovenia) Celje Pivovarna Laško	Stade Pierre de Coubertin, Paris; Attendance: 2,780; Referees: Kurtagic, Wetterwik (SWE)
23 September 2018; 17:00	Hansen 7	(17–12)	Nenadić 5	Stade Pierre de Coubertin, Paris; Attendance: 2,780; Referees: Kurtagic, Wetterwik (SWE)
23 September 2018; 17:00	3× (yellow card) 2× (suspension)	Report	3× (yellow card) 2× (suspension)	Stade Pierre de Coubertin, Paris; Attendance: 2,780; Referees: Kurtagic, Wetterwik (SWE)

23 September 2018; 19:00	MOL-Pick Szeged (Hungary)	30–28	(France) HBC Nantes	Városi Sportcsarnok, Szeged; Attendance: 3,200; Referees: Nikolić, Stojković (SRB)
23 September 2018; 19:00	Bodó 8	(11–12)	Lazarov 6	Városi Sportcsarnok, Szeged; Attendance: 3,200; Referees: Nikolić, Stojković (SRB)
23 September 2018; 19:00	4× (yellow card) 5× (suspension)	Report	4× (yellow card) 4× (suspension)	Városi Sportcsarnok, Szeged; Attendance: 3,200; Referees: Nikolić, Stojković (SRB)

29 September 2018; 20:00	PPD Zagreb (Croatia)	21–32	(France) Paris Saint-Germain	Arena Zagreb, Zagreb; Attendance: 9,134; Referees: Brunovský, Čanda (SVK)
29 September 2018; 20:00	Horvat 4	(9–15)	L. Karabatic 8	Arena Zagreb, Zagreb; Attendance: 9,134; Referees: Brunovský, Čanda (SVK)
29 September 2018; 20:00	4× (yellow card)	Report	3× (yellow card) 1× (suspension)	Arena Zagreb, Zagreb; Attendance: 9,134; Referees: Brunovský, Čanda (SVK)

30 September 2018; 17:00	Celje Pivovarna Laško (Slovenia)	23–20	(Germany) Flensburg-Handewitt	Zlatorog Arena, Celje; Attendance: 3,300; Referees: Pandzić, Mosorinski (SRB)
30 September 2018; 17:00	Malus, Razgor 5	(10–11)	Glandorf, Lauge Schmidt 4	Zlatorog Arena, Celje; Attendance: 3,300; Referees: Pandzić, Mosorinski (SRB)
30 September 2018; 17:00	3× (yellow card) 1× (suspension)	Report	3× (yellow card) 4× (suspension)	Zlatorog Arena, Celje; Attendance: 3,300; Referees: Pandzić, Mosorinski (SRB)

30 September 2018; 17:00	HBC Nantes (France)	35–27	(Denmark) Skjern Håndbold	Palais des Sports de Beaulieu, Nantes; Attendance: 5,194; Referees: Vešović, Mitrović (MNE)
30 September 2018; 17:00	Balaguer 7	(17–16)	Eggert, Tangen 7	Palais des Sports de Beaulieu, Nantes; Attendance: 5,194; Referees: Vešović, Mitrović (MNE)
30 September 2018; 17:00	3× (yellow card) 4× (suspension)	Report	3× (yellow card) 4× (suspension)	Palais des Sports de Beaulieu, Nantes; Attendance: 5,194; Referees: Vešović, Mitrović (MNE)

30 September 2018; 17:00	Motor Zaporizhzhia (Ukraine)	31–32	(Hungary) MOL-Pick Szeged	Yunost Sport Hall, Zaporizhzhia; Attendance: 3,480; Referees: Leszczyński, Piechota (POL)
30 September 2018; 17:00	Kozakevych 8	(13–19)	Šoštarič 8	Yunost Sport Hall, Zaporizhzhia; Attendance: 3,480; Referees: Leszczyński, Piechota (POL)
30 September 2018; 17:00	2× (yellow card) 4× (suspension)	Report	3× (yellow card) 3× (suspension)	Yunost Sport Hall, Zaporizhzhia; Attendance: 3,480; Referees: Leszczyński, Piechota (POL)

3 October 2018; 19:00	Flensburg-Handewitt (Germany)	31–24	(Ukraine) Motor Zaporizhzhia	Flens-Arena, Flensburg; Attendance: 3,309; Referees: Baďura, Ondogrecula (SVK)
3 October 2018; 19:00	Rød 7	(13–11)	Paczkowski 6	Flens-Arena, Flensburg; Attendance: 3,309; Referees: Baďura, Ondogrecula (SVK)
3 October 2018; 19:00	1× (yellow card) 3× (suspension)	Report	4× (yellow card) 6× (suspension)	Flens-Arena, Flensburg; Attendance: 3,309; Referees: Baďura, Ondogrecula (SVK)

6 October 2018; 17:30	Paris Saint-Germain (France)	35–34	(France) HBC Nantes	Stade Pierre de Coubertin, Paris; Attendance: 2,400; Referees: Mažeika, Gatelis (LTU)
6 October 2018; 17:30	L. Karabatic, Remili 7	(19–16)	three players 6	Stade Pierre de Coubertin, Paris; Attendance: 2,400; Referees: Mažeika, Gatelis (LTU)
6 October 2018; 17:30	2× (yellow card) 6× (suspension)	Report	3× (yellow card) 3× (suspension)	Stade Pierre de Coubertin, Paris; Attendance: 2,400; Referees: Mažeika, Gatelis (LTU)

6 October 2018; 17:30	MOL-Pick Szeged (Hungary)	33–24	(Slovenia) Celje Pivovarna Laško	Városi Sportcsarnok, Szeged; Attendance: 3,200; Referees: Covalciuc, Covalciuc (MDA)
6 October 2018; 17:30	Bánhidi, Maqueda 5	(18–8)	Malus, Ovniček 5	Városi Sportcsarnok, Szeged; Attendance: 3,200; Referees: Covalciuc, Covalciuc (MDA)
6 October 2018; 17:30	2× (yellow card) 6× (suspension)	Report	2× (yellow card) 4× (suspension)	Városi Sportcsarnok, Szeged; Attendance: 3,200; Referees: Covalciuc, Covalciuc (MDA)

7 October 2018; 16:50	Skjern Håndbold (Denmark)	31–31	(Croatia) PPD Zagreb	Skjern Bank Arena, Skjern; Attendance: 2,589; Referees: Geipel, Helbig (GER)
7 October 2018; 16:50	Mogensen 6	(14–14)	Burić 7	Skjern Bank Arena, Skjern; Attendance: 2,589; Referees: Geipel, Helbig (GER)
7 October 2018; 16:50	3× (yellow card) 2× (suspension)	Report	2× (yellow card) 5× (suspension)	Skjern Bank Arena, Skjern; Attendance: 2,589; Referees: Geipel, Helbig (GER)

14 October 2018; 16:50	Skjern Håndbold (Denmark)	24–26	(France) Paris Saint-Germain	Jyske Bank Boxen, Herning; Attendance: 7,008; Referees: Santos, Fonseca (POR)
14 October 2018; 16:50	Mogensen 10	(10–12)	Hansen 8	Jyske Bank Boxen, Herning; Attendance: 7,008; Referees: Santos, Fonseca (POR)
14 October 2018; 16:50	3× (yellow card) 3× (suspension) 1× (red card)	Report	4× (suspension) 1× (red card)	Jyske Bank Boxen, Herning; Attendance: 7,008; Referees: Santos, Fonseca (POR)

14 October 2018; 17:00	MOL-Pick Szeged (Hungary)	30–28	(Germany) Flensburg-Handewitt	Városi Sportcsarnok, Szeged; Attendance: 3,200; Referees: Nikolov, Nachevski (MKD)
14 October 2018; 17:00	Šoštarič 6	(15–14)	Glandorf, Rød 5	Városi Sportcsarnok, Szeged; Attendance: 3,200; Referees: Nikolov, Nachevski (MKD)
14 October 2018; 17:00	3× (yellow card) 2× (suspension)	Report	3× (yellow card) 2× (suspension)	Városi Sportcsarnok, Szeged; Attendance: 3,200; Referees: Nikolov, Nachevski (MKD)

14 October 2018; 17:00	Motor Zaporizhzhia (Ukraine)	35–27	(Croatia) PPD Zagreb	Yunost Sport Hall, Zaporizhzhia; Attendance: 3,500; Referees: Horáček, Novotný (CZE)
14 October 2018; 17:00	Pukhouski 7	(17–13)	Božić Pavletić 10	Yunost Sport Hall, Zaporizhzhia; Attendance: 3,500; Referees: Horáček, Novotný (CZE)
14 October 2018; 17:00	3× (yellow card) 2× (suspension)	Report	2× (yellow card) 1× (suspension)	Yunost Sport Hall, Zaporizhzhia; Attendance: 3,500; Referees: Horáček, Novotný (CZE)

14 October 2018; 19:00	HBC Nantes (France)	38–27	(Slovenia) Celje Pivovarna Laško	Palais des Sports de Beaulieu, Nantes; Attendance: 5,332; Referees: Jørum, Kleven (NOR)
14 October 2018; 19:00	Lazarov 7	(17–13)	Vujović 6	Palais des Sports de Beaulieu, Nantes; Attendance: 5,332; Referees: Jørum, Kleven (NOR)
14 October 2018; 19:00	2× (yellow card) 3× (suspension)	Report	2× (yellow card) 7× (suspension)	Palais des Sports de Beaulieu, Nantes; Attendance: 5,332; Referees: Jørum, Kleven (NOR)

3 November 2018; 17:30	HBC Nantes (France)	23–20	(Croatia) PPD Zagreb	Palais des Sports de Beaulieu, Nantes; Attendance: 5,902; Referees: Sondors, Līcis (LAT)
3 November 2018; 17:30	Lazarov 5	(10–11)	Horvat 5	Palais des Sports de Beaulieu, Nantes; Attendance: 5,902; Referees: Sondors, Līcis (LAT)
3 November 2018; 17:30	2× (yellow card) 1× (suspension)	Report	4× (yellow card) 3× (suspension)	Palais des Sports de Beaulieu, Nantes; Attendance: 5,902; Referees: Sondors, Līcis (LAT)

4 November 2018; 17:00	Celje Pivovarna Laško (Slovenia)	33–28	(Ukraine) Motor Zaporizhzhia	Zlatorog Arena, Celje; Attendance: 3,900; Referees: Elíasson, Pálsson (ISL)
4 November 2018; 17:00	Accambray 7	(18–14)	Malašinskas 10	Zlatorog Arena, Celje; Attendance: 3,900; Referees: Elíasson, Pálsson (ISL)
4 November 2018; 17:00	3× (yellow card) 5× (suspension)	Report	3× (yellow card) 5× (suspension)	Zlatorog Arena, Celje; Attendance: 3,900; Referees: Elíasson, Pálsson (ISL)

4 November 2018; 17:00	Paris Saint-Germain (France)	33–31	(Hungary) MOL-Pick Szeged	Stade Pierre de Coubertin, Paris; Attendance: 2,500; Referees: Geipel, Helbig (GER)
4 November 2018; 17:00	Gensheimer 9	(15–14)	Bodó 7	Stade Pierre de Coubertin, Paris; Attendance: 2,500; Referees: Geipel, Helbig (GER)
4 November 2018; 17:00	3× (yellow card) 2× (suspension)	Report	2× (yellow card) 3× (suspension)	Stade Pierre de Coubertin, Paris; Attendance: 2,500; Referees: Geipel, Helbig (GER)

4 November 2018; 18:15	Flensburg-Handewitt (Germany)	26–22	(Denmark) Skjern Håndbold	Flens-Arena, Flensburg; Attendance: 5,211; Referees: Kurtagic, Wetterwik (SWE)
4 November 2018; 18:15	three players 5	(10–10)	Tangen 5	Flens-Arena, Flensburg; Attendance: 5,211; Referees: Kurtagic, Wetterwik (SWE)
4 November 2018; 18:15	2× (yellow card) 1× (suspension)	Report	3× (yellow card) 1× (suspension)	Flens-Arena, Flensburg; Attendance: 5,211; Referees: Kurtagic, Wetterwik (SWE)

10 November 2018; 17:30	Paris Saint-Germain (France)	29–28	(Germany) Flensburg-Handewitt	Stade Pierre de Coubertin, Paris; Attendance: 3,300; Referees: Brkic, Jusufhodzic (AUT)
10 November 2018; 17:30	Gensheimer 8	(12–15)	Jeppsson 9	Stade Pierre de Coubertin, Paris; Attendance: 3,300; Referees: Brkic, Jusufhodzic (AUT)
10 November 2018; 17:30	3× (yellow card) 1× (suspension)	Report	2× (yellow card) 2× (suspension)	Stade Pierre de Coubertin, Paris; Attendance: 3,300; Referees: Brkic, Jusufhodzic (AUT)

10 November 2018; 20:00	PPD Zagreb (Croatia)	24–22	(Slovenia) Celje Pivovarna Laško	Arena Zagreb, Zagreb; Attendance: 5,860; Referees: Zotin, Volodkov (RUS)
10 November 2018; 20:00	Horvat 6	(11–9)	Vujović 5	Arena Zagreb, Zagreb; Attendance: 5,860; Referees: Zotin, Volodkov (RUS)
10 November 2018; 20:00	3× (yellow card) 5× (suspension)	Report	3× (yellow card) 2× (suspension)	Arena Zagreb, Zagreb; Attendance: 5,860; Referees: Zotin, Volodkov (RUS)

11 November 2018; 16:50	Skjern Håndbold (Denmark)	26–29	(Hungary) MOL-Pick Szeged	Skjern Bank Arena, Skjern; Attendance: 2,761; Referees: López, Ramírez (ESP)
11 November 2018; 16:50	Eggert 6	(15–14)	Cañellas, Šoštarič 5	Skjern Bank Arena, Skjern; Attendance: 2,761; Referees: López, Ramírez (ESP)
11 November 2018; 16:50	2× (yellow card) 5× (suspension) 1× (red card)	Report	1× (yellow card) 4× (suspension)	Skjern Bank Arena, Skjern; Attendance: 2,761; Referees: López, Ramírez (ESP)

11 November 2018; 17:00	Motor Zaporizhzhia (Ukraine)	30–30	(France) HBC Nantes	Yunost Sport Hall, Zaporizhzhia; Attendance: 3,500; Referees: Nikolov, Nachevski (MKD)
11 November 2018; 17:00	Kozakevych 9	(15–14)	Tournat 8	Yunost Sport Hall, Zaporizhzhia; Attendance: 3,500; Referees: Nikolov, Nachevski (MKD)
11 November 2018; 17:00	3× (yellow card) 2× (suspension)	Report	4× (yellow card) 3× (suspension)	Yunost Sport Hall, Zaporizhzhia; Attendance: 3,500; Referees: Nikolov, Nachevski (MKD)

14 November 2018; 18:45	Flensburg-Handewitt (Germany)	20–27	(France) Paris Saint-Germain	Flens-Arena, Flensburg; Attendance: 5,223; Referees: Horáček, Novotný (CZE)
14 November 2018; 18:45	Wanne 5	(9–12)	Hansen 6	Flens-Arena, Flensburg; Attendance: 5,223; Referees: Horáček, Novotný (CZE)
14 November 2018; 18:45	3× (yellow card) 2× (suspension)	Report	1× (yellow card) 2× (suspension)	Flens-Arena, Flensburg; Attendance: 5,223; Referees: Horáček, Novotný (CZE)

18 November 2018; 17:00	MOL-Pick Szeged (Hungary)	33–33	(Denmark) Skjern Håndbold	Városi Sportcsarnok, Szeged; Attendance: 3,200; Referees: Brunner, Salah (SUI)
18 November 2018; 17:00	Sigurmannsson 6	(14–15)	Søndergaard 10	Városi Sportcsarnok, Szeged; Attendance: 3,200; Referees: Brunner, Salah (SUI)
18 November 2018; 17:00	3× (yellow card) 2× (suspension)	Report	2× (yellow card) 7× (suspension) 1× (red card)	Városi Sportcsarnok, Szeged; Attendance: 3,200; Referees: Brunner, Salah (SUI)

18 November 2018; 17:00	Celje Pivovarna Laško (Slovenia)	30–21	(Croatia) PPD Zagreb	Zlatorog Arena, Celje; Attendance: 5,600; Referees: Erdoğan, Özdeniz (TUR)
18 November 2018; 17:00	Vujović 7	(10–9)	Horvat 5	Zlatorog Arena, Celje; Attendance: 5,600; Referees: Erdoğan, Özdeniz (TUR)
18 November 2018; 17:00	3× (yellow card) 6× (suspension) 1× (red card)	Report	4× (yellow card) 3× (suspension)	Zlatorog Arena, Celje; Attendance: 5,600; Referees: Erdoğan, Özdeniz (TUR)

18 November 2018; 17:00	HBC Nantes (France)	23–27	(Ukraine) Motor Zaporizhzhia	Palais des Sports de Beaulieu, Nantes; Attendance: 5,902; Referees: Kurtagic, Wetterwik (SWE)
18 November 2018; 17:00	Claire 6	(13–12)	Malašinskas 8	Palais des Sports de Beaulieu, Nantes; Attendance: 5,902; Referees: Kurtagic, Wetterwik (SWE)
18 November 2018; 17:00	2× (yellow card) 3× (suspension)	Report	2× (yellow card) 3× (suspension)	Palais des Sports de Beaulieu, Nantes; Attendance: 5,902; Referees: Kurtagic, Wetterwik (SWE)

24 November 2018; 17:30	MOL-Pick Szeged (Hungary)	33–32	(France) Paris Saint-Germain	Városi Sportcsarnok, Szeged; Attendance: 3,200; Referees: Gubica, Milošević (CRO)
24 November 2018; 17:30	Sigurmannsson 11	(16–14)	Remili 8	Városi Sportcsarnok, Szeged; Attendance: 3,200; Referees: Gubica, Milošević (CRO)
24 November 2018; 17:30	3× (yellow card) 5× (suspension)	Report	2× (yellow card) 4× (suspension) 1× (red card)	Városi Sportcsarnok, Szeged; Attendance: 3,200; Referees: Gubica, Milošević (CRO)

24 November 2018; 19:15	PPD Zagreb (Croatia)	27–27	(France) HBC Nantes	Arena Zagreb, Zagreb; Attendance: 5,273; Referees: Baranowski, Lemanowicz (POL)
24 November 2018; 19:15	Horvat 8	(12–12)	three players 5	Arena Zagreb, Zagreb; Attendance: 5,273; Referees: Baranowski, Lemanowicz (POL)
24 November 2018; 19:15	4× (yellow card) 2× (suspension)	Report	4× (yellow card)	Arena Zagreb, Zagreb; Attendance: 5,273; Referees: Baranowski, Lemanowicz (POL)

25 November 2018; 16:50	Skjern Håndbold (Denmark)	24–31	(Germany) Flensburg-Handewitt	Skjern Bank Arena, Skjern; Attendance: 3,177; Referees: Elíasson, Pálsson (ISL)
25 November 2018; 16:50	Eggert 8	(13–14)	Wanne 6	Skjern Bank Arena, Skjern; Attendance: 3,177; Referees: Elíasson, Pálsson (ISL)
25 November 2018; 16:50	1× (yellow card) 2× (suspension)	Report	2× (yellow card) 4× (suspension)	Skjern Bank Arena, Skjern; Attendance: 3,177; Referees: Elíasson, Pálsson (ISL)

25 November 2018; 17:00	Motor Zaporizhzhia (Ukraine)	36–27	(Slovenia) Celje Pivovarna Laško	Yunost Sport Hall, Zaporizhzhia; Attendance: 3,500; Referees: Andorka, Hucker (HUN)
25 November 2018; 17:00	Malašinskas 9	(18–12)	Šarac 4	Yunost Sport Hall, Zaporizhzhia; Attendance: 3,500; Referees: Andorka, Hucker (HUN)
25 November 2018; 17:00	1× (yellow card) 4× (suspension)	Report	2× (yellow card) 5× (suspension)	Yunost Sport Hall, Zaporizhzhia; Attendance: 3,500; Referees: Andorka, Hucker (HUN)

28 November 2018; 19:00	Flensburg-Handewitt (Germany)	27–25	(Hungary) MOL-Pick Szeged	Flens-Arena, Flensburg; Attendance: 4,304; Referees: Mažeika, Gatelis (LTU)
28 November 2018; 19:00	Jøndal 8	(14–14)	Bodó 5	Flens-Arena, Flensburg; Attendance: 4,304; Referees: Mažeika, Gatelis (LTU)
28 November 2018; 19:00	2× (yellow card) 3× (suspension)	Report	2× (yellow card) 4× (suspension)	Flens-Arena, Flensburg; Attendance: 4,304; Referees: Mažeika, Gatelis (LTU)

1 December 2018; 17:00	PPD Zagreb (Croatia)	27–24	(Ukraine) Motor Zaporizhzhia	Varaždin Arena, Varaždin; Attendance: 3,126; Referees: Nikolić, Stojković (SRB)
1 December 2018; 17:00	Horvat 8	(14–11)	Paczkowski, Pukhouski 6	Varaždin Arena, Varaždin; Attendance: 3,126; Referees: Nikolić, Stojković (SRB)
1 December 2018; 17:00	3× (yellow card) 6× (suspension) 1× (red card)	Report	4× (yellow card) 6× (suspension)	Varaždin Arena, Varaždin; Attendance: 3,126; Referees: Nikolić, Stojković (SRB)

1 December 2018; 17:30	Paris Saint-Germain (France)	38–28	(Denmark) Skjern Håndbold	Stade Pierre de Coubertin, Paris; Attendance: 3,600; Referees: Nikolov, Nachevski (MKD)
1 December 2018; 17:30	Gensheimer 9	(19–13)	Tangen 6	Stade Pierre de Coubertin, Paris; Attendance: 3,600; Referees: Nikolov, Nachevski (MKD)
1 December 2018; 17:30	3× (yellow card) 1× (suspension)	Report	3× (yellow card) 1× (suspension)	Stade Pierre de Coubertin, Paris; Attendance: 3,600; Referees: Nikolov, Nachevski (MKD)

2 December 2018; 17:00	Celje Pivovarna Laško (Slovenia)	29–29	(France) HBC Nantes	Zlatorog Arena, Celje; Attendance: 4,800; Referees: López, Ramírez (ESP)
2 December 2018; 17:00	Vujović 6	(15–19)	Delecroix 6	Zlatorog Arena, Celje; Attendance: 4,800; Referees: López, Ramírez (ESP)
2 December 2018; 17:00	1× (yellow card) 3× (suspension)	Report	1× (yellow card) 2× (suspension)	Zlatorog Arena, Celje; Attendance: 4,800; Referees: López, Ramírez (ESP)

7 February 2019; 20:45	HBC Nantes (France)	31–35	(France) Paris Saint-Germain	Palais des Sports de Beaulieu, Nantes; Attendance: 5,657; Referees: Pavićević, Ražnatović (MNE)
7 February 2019; 20:45	Lazarov, Rivera 6	(15–18)	Abalo 7	Palais des Sports de Beaulieu, Nantes; Attendance: 5,657; Referees: Pavićević, Ražnatović (MNE)
7 February 2019; 20:45	2× (suspension)	Report	2× (yellow card) 2× (suspension)	Palais des Sports de Beaulieu, Nantes; Attendance: 5,657; Referees: Pavićević, Ražnatović (MNE)

10 February 2019; 17:00	Celje Pivovarna Laško (Slovenia)	28–29	(Hungary) MOL-Pick Szeged	Zlatorog Arena, Celje; Attendance: 4,900; Referees: Santos, Fonseca (POR)
10 February 2019; 17:00	Accambray 8	(16–18)	Maqueda 7	Zlatorog Arena, Celje; Attendance: 4,900; Referees: Santos, Fonseca (POR)
10 February 2019; 17:00	2× (yellow card) 4× (suspension)	Report	3× (yellow card) 9× (suspension)	Zlatorog Arena, Celje; Attendance: 4,900; Referees: Santos, Fonseca (POR)

10 February 2019; 17:00	Motor Zaporizhzhia (Ukraine)	28–26	(Germany) Flensburg-Handewitt	Yunost Sport Hall, Zaporizhzhia; Attendance: 3,500; Referees: Sondors, Līcis (LAT)
10 February 2019; 17:00	Pukhouski 9	(10–12)	Schmidt 6	Yunost Sport Hall, Zaporizhzhia; Attendance: 3,500; Referees: Sondors, Līcis (LAT)
10 February 2019; 17:00	2× (yellow card) 4× (suspension)	Report	2× (yellow card) 4× (suspension) 1× (red card)	Yunost Sport Hall, Zaporizhzhia; Attendance: 3,500; Referees: Sondors, Līcis (LAT)

10 February 2019; 17:00	PPD Zagreb (Croatia)	32–29	(Denmark) Skjern Håndbold	Arena Zagreb, Zagreb; Attendance: 3,845; Referees: Horáček, Novotný (CZE)
10 February 2019; 17:00	Sršen 9	(15–14)	Myrhol 8	Arena Zagreb, Zagreb; Attendance: 3,845; Referees: Horáček, Novotný (CZE)
10 February 2019; 17:00	2× (yellow card) 3× (suspension) 1× (red card)	Report	2× (yellow card) 3× (suspension)	Arena Zagreb, Zagreb; Attendance: 3,845; Referees: Horáček, Novotný (CZE)

13 February 2019; 19:00	Flensburg-Handewitt (Germany)	27–26	(Slovenia) Celje Pivovarna Laško	Flens-Arena, Flensburg; Attendance: 5,025; Referees: Baranowski, Lemanowicz (POL)
13 February 2019; 19:00	Wanne 8	(16–12)	Vujović 7	Flens-Arena, Flensburg; Attendance: 5,025; Referees: Baranowski, Lemanowicz (POL)
13 February 2019; 19:00	3× (yellow card) 1× (suspension)	Report	3× (yellow card) 3× (suspension)	Flens-Arena, Flensburg; Attendance: 5,025; Referees: Baranowski, Lemanowicz (POL)

17 February 2019; 16:50	Skjern Håndbold (Denmark)	32–34	(France) HBC Nantes	Skjern Bank Arena, Skjern; Attendance: 2,781; Referees: Zotin, Volodkov (RUS)
17 February 2019; 16:50	Myrhol 8	(17–15)	Lazarov 6	Skjern Bank Arena, Skjern; Attendance: 2,781; Referees: Zotin, Volodkov (RUS)
17 February 2019; 16:50	3× (yellow card) 6× (suspension)	Report	4× (yellow card) 4× (suspension)	Skjern Bank Arena, Skjern; Attendance: 2,781; Referees: Zotin, Volodkov (RUS)

17 February 2019; 17:00	MOL-Pick Szeged (Hungary)	30–29	(Ukraine) Motor Zaporizhzhia	Városi Sportcsarnok, Szeged; Attendance: 3,200; Referees: Konjičanin, Konjičanin (BIH)
17 February 2019; 17:00	Šoštarič 9	(12–15)	Soroka 8	Városi Sportcsarnok, Szeged; Attendance: 3,200; Referees: Konjičanin, Konjičanin (BIH)
17 February 2019; 17:00	1× (yellow card) 4× (suspension)	Report	3× (yellow card) 8× (suspension)	Városi Sportcsarnok, Szeged; Attendance: 3,200; Referees: Konjičanin, Konjičanin (BIH)

17 February 2019; 19:00	Paris Saint-Germain (France)	33–28	(Croatia) PPD Zagreb	Stade Pierre de Coubertin, Paris; Attendance: 3,100; Referees: Elíasson, Pálsson (ISL)
17 February 2019; 19:00	Gensheimer 8	(19–13)	Horvat 6	Stade Pierre de Coubertin, Paris; Attendance: 3,100; Referees: Elíasson, Pálsson (ISL)
17 February 2019; 19:00	2× (yellow card) 3× (suspension) 1× (red card)	Report	4× (yellow card) 2× (suspension)	Stade Pierre de Coubertin, Paris; Attendance: 3,100; Referees: Elíasson, Pálsson (ISL)

23 February 2019; 17:30	HBC Nantes (France)	29–26	(Hungary) MOL-Pick Szeged	Palais des Sports de Beaulieu, Nantes; Attendance: 5,902; Referees: Horáček, Novotný (CZE)
23 February 2019; 17:30	Folch 8	(13–11)	Sigurmannsson 6	Palais des Sports de Beaulieu, Nantes; Attendance: 5,902; Referees: Horáček, Novotný (CZE)
23 February 2019; 17:30	2× (yellow card) 3× (suspension)	Report	1× (yellow card) 6× (suspension)	Palais des Sports de Beaulieu, Nantes; Attendance: 5,902; Referees: Horáček, Novotný (CZE)

24 February 2019; 17:00	Celje Pivovarna Laško (Slovenia)	32–36	(France) Paris Saint-Germain	Zlatorog Arena, Celje; Attendance: 5,800; Referees: Jørum, Kleven (NOR)
24 February 2019; 17:00	Accambray 5	(17–17)	Abalo 8	Zlatorog Arena, Celje; Attendance: 5,800; Referees: Jørum, Kleven (NOR)
24 February 2019; 17:00	1× (yellow card)	Report	2× (yellow card) 3× (suspension)	Zlatorog Arena, Celje; Attendance: 5,800; Referees: Jørum, Kleven (NOR)

24 February 2019; 17:00	PPD Zagreb (Croatia)	21–22	(Germany) Flensburg-Handewitt	Arena Zagreb, Zagreb; Attendance: 5,800; Referees: Caçador, Nicolau (POR)
24 February 2019; 17:00	Horvat 5	(11–9)	Wanne 9	Arena Zagreb, Zagreb; Attendance: 5,800; Referees: Caçador, Nicolau (POR)
24 February 2019; 17:00	3× (yellow card) 3× (suspension)	Report	1× (yellow card) 4× (suspension)	Arena Zagreb, Zagreb; Attendance: 5,800; Referees: Caçador, Nicolau (POR)

24 February 2019; 17:00	Motor Zaporizhzhia (Ukraine)	33–23	(Denmark) Skjern Håndbold	Yunost Sport Hall, Zaporizhzhia; Attendance: 3,650; Referees: Pandzić, Mosorinski (SRB)
24 February 2019; 17:00	Pukhouski 8	(13–9)	Eggert 5	Yunost Sport Hall, Zaporizhzhia; Attendance: 3,650; Referees: Pandzić, Mosorinski (SRB)
24 February 2019; 17:00	3× (yellow card) 7× (suspension)	Report	3× (yellow card) 4× (suspension)	Yunost Sport Hall, Zaporizhzhia; Attendance: 3,650; Referees: Pandzić, Mosorinski (SRB)

27 February 2019; 19:00	Flensburg-Handewitt (Germany)	29–29	(France) HBC Nantes	Flens-Arena, Flensburg; Attendance: 4,724; Referees: Brunner, Salah (SUI)
27 February 2019; 19:00	Rød, Wanne 5	(17–17)	Rivera 5	Flens-Arena, Flensburg; Attendance: 4,724; Referees: Brunner, Salah (SUI)
27 February 2019; 19:00	2× (yellow card) 4× (suspension)	Report	4× (suspension)	Flens-Arena, Flensburg; Attendance: 4,724; Referees: Brunner, Salah (SUI)

3 March 2019; 16:50	Skjern Håndbold (Denmark)	35–32	(Slovenia) Celje Pivovarna Laško	Skjern Bank Arena, Skjern; Attendance: 2,498; Referees: Sondors, Līcis (LAT)
3 March 2019; 16:50	Myrhol 8	(20–14)	Marguč 9	Skjern Bank Arena, Skjern; Attendance: 2,498; Referees: Sondors, Līcis (LAT)
3 March 2019; 16:50	2× (yellow card) 4× (suspension)	Report	2× (yellow card) 4× (suspension)	Skjern Bank Arena, Skjern; Attendance: 2,498; Referees: Sondors, Līcis (LAT)

3 March 2019; 17:00	Paris Saint-Germain (France)	31–25	(Ukraine) Motor Zaporizhzhia	Stade Pierre de Coubertin, Paris; Attendance: 3,200; Referees: Baranowski, Lemanowicz (POL)
3 March 2019; 17:00	Stepančić 9	(16–13)	three players 5	Stade Pierre de Coubertin, Paris; Attendance: 3,200; Referees: Baranowski, Lemanowicz (POL)
3 March 2019; 17:00	2× (yellow card) 2× (suspension)	Report	3× (yellow card) 6× (suspension)	Stade Pierre de Coubertin, Paris; Attendance: 3,200; Referees: Baranowski, Lemanowicz (POL)

3 March 2019; 17:00	MOL-Pick Szeged (Hungary)	26–26	(Croatia) PPD Zagreb	Városi Sportcsarnok, Szeged; Attendance: 3,200; Referees: Kurtagic, Wetterwik (SWE)
3 March 2019; 17:00	Bombač 7	(14–14)	Mandić 8	Városi Sportcsarnok, Szeged; Attendance: 3,200; Referees: Kurtagic, Wetterwik (SWE)
3 March 2019; 17:00	2× (yellow card) 4× (suspension)	Report	2× (yellow card) 2× (suspension)	Városi Sportcsarnok, Szeged; Attendance: 3,200; Referees: Kurtagic, Wetterwik (SWE)

=== Group C ===
Pos	Team	Pld	W	D	L	GF	GA	GD	Pts	Qualification
1	(Denmark) Bjerringbro-Silkeborg	10	8	0	2	323	273	+50	16	Playoffs
2	(Portugal) Sporting CP	10	7	0	3	304	277	+27	14 (Note: Sporting 56–55 Prešov)	Playoffs
3	(Slovakia) Tatran Prešov	10	7	0	3	278	268	+10	14	
4	(Russia) Chekhovskiye Medvedi	10	4	0	6	280	279	+1	8	
5	(Turkey) Beşiktaş	10	3	0	7	255	289	−34	6	
6	(North Macedonia) Metalurg Skopje	10	1	0	9	246	300	−54	2	

Source: EHF
Notes:

15 September 2018; 16:00	Beşiktaş (Turkey)	22–28	(Slovakia) Tatran Prešov	Recep Topaloğlu Sports Hall, İzmit; Attendance: 800; Referees: Brkic, Jusufhodzic (AUT)
15 September 2018; 16:00	Döne, Özbahar 4	(10–13)	Butorac, Lapajne 4	Recep Topaloğlu Sports Hall, İzmit; Attendance: 800; Referees: Brkic, Jusufhodzic (AUT)
15 September 2018; 16:00	2× (yellow card) 3× (suspension) 1× (red card)	Report	2× (yellow card) 3× (suspension) 1× (red card)	Recep Topaloğlu Sports Hall, İzmit; Attendance: 800; Referees: Brkic, Jusufhodzic (AUT)

15 September 2018; 18:30	Sporting CP (Portugal)	34–26	(North Macedonia) Metalurg	Pavilhão João Rocha, Lisbon; Attendance: 1,043; Referees: Mata, López (ESP)
15 September 2018; 18:30	Chiuffa 6	(13–13)	Tankoski 6	Pavilhão João Rocha, Lisbon; Attendance: 1,043; Referees: Mata, López (ESP)
15 September 2018; 18:30	2× (yellow card) 2× (suspension)	Report	2× (yellow card) 2× (suspension)	Pavilhão João Rocha, Lisbon; Attendance: 1,043; Referees: Mata, López (ESP)

16 September 2018; 15:10	Bjerringbro-Silkeborg (Denmark)	39–28	(Russia) Chekhovskiye Medvedi	Jysk Arena, Silkeborg; Attendance: 1,632; Referees: Gasmi, Gasmi (FRA)
16 September 2018; 15:10	Hansen 14	(21–16)	Kotov 5	Jysk Arena, Silkeborg; Attendance: 1,632; Referees: Gasmi, Gasmi (FRA)
16 September 2018; 15:10	1× (yellow card) 3× (suspension)	Report	1× (yellow card) 3× (suspension)	Jysk Arena, Silkeborg; Attendance: 1,632; Referees: Gasmi, Gasmi (FRA)

22 September 2018; 16:00	Chekhovskiye Medvedi (Russia)	22–23	(Portugal) Sporting CP	Olimpiysky Sport Palace, Chekhov; Attendance: 1,100; Referees: Horváth, Marton (HUN)
22 September 2018; 16:00	Kosorotov 6	(14–10)	Araújo, Chiuffa 4	Olimpiysky Sport Palace, Chekhov; Attendance: 1,100; Referees: Horváth, Marton (HUN)
22 September 2018; 16:00	2× (yellow card) 6× (suspension)	Report	1× (yellow card) 6× (suspension)	Olimpiysky Sport Palace, Chekhov; Attendance: 1,100; Referees: Horváth, Marton (HUN)

22 September 2018; 18:00	Tatran Prešov (Slovakia)	26–24	(Denmark) Bjerringbro-Silkeborg	Tatran Handball Arena, Prešov; Attendance: 2,950; Referees: Konjičanin, Konjičanin (BIH)
22 September 2018; 18:00	Lapajne 6	(12–12)	Nielsen 6	Tatran Handball Arena, Prešov; Attendance: 2,950; Referees: Konjičanin, Konjičanin (BIH)
22 September 2018; 18:00	1× (yellow card) 2× (suspension)	Report	3× (yellow card) 2× (suspension)	Tatran Handball Arena, Prešov; Attendance: 2,950; Referees: Konjičanin, Konjičanin (BIH)

23 September 2018; 17:00	Metalurg (North Macedonia)	22–30	(Turkey) Beşiktaş	Boris Trajkovski Sports Center, Skopje; Attendance: 1,000; Referees: Baranowski, Lemanowicz (POL)
23 September 2018; 17:00	Jaganjac 7	(13–14)	Lasica 7	Boris Trajkovski Sports Center, Skopje; Attendance: 1,000; Referees: Baranowski, Lemanowicz (POL)
23 September 2018; 17:00	3× (yellow card) 1× (suspension)	Report	3× (yellow card) 2× (suspension)	Boris Trajkovski Sports Center, Skopje; Attendance: 1,000; Referees: Baranowski, Lemanowicz (POL)

29 September 2018; 15:00	Chekhovskiye Medvedi (Russia)	22–24	(Turkey) Beşiktaş	Olimpiysky Sport Palace, Chekhov; Attendance: 1,100; Referees: Katsikis, Michailidis (GRE)
29 September 2018; 15:00	Kotov 6	(13–12)	Döne 9	Olimpiysky Sport Palace, Chekhov; Attendance: 1,100; Referees: Katsikis, Michailidis (GRE)
29 September 2018; 15:00	2× (yellow card) 4× (suspension)	Report	2× (yellow card) 3× (suspension)	Olimpiysky Sport Palace, Chekhov; Attendance: 1,100; Referees: Katsikis, Michailidis (GRE)

29 September 2018; 19:30	Sporting CP (Portugal)	32–35	(Denmark) Bjerringbro-Silkeborg	Pavilhão João Rocha, Lisbon; Attendance: 2,493; Referees: Manea, Iliescu (ROU)
29 September 2018; 19:30	three players 5	(14–19)	Markussen 9	Pavilhão João Rocha, Lisbon; Attendance: 2,493; Referees: Manea, Iliescu (ROU)
29 September 2018; 19:30	2× (yellow card) 3× (suspension)	Report	3× (yellow card) 5× (suspension)	Pavilhão João Rocha, Lisbon; Attendance: 2,493; Referees: Manea, Iliescu (ROU)

30 September 2018; 17:00	Metalurg (North Macedonia)	24–29	(Slovakia) Tatran Prešov	Jane Sandanski Arena, Skopje; Attendance: 2,000; Referees: Leandersson, Lindroos (FIN)
30 September 2018; 17:00	three players 5	(12–13)	Babić 6	Jane Sandanski Arena, Skopje; Attendance: 2,000; Referees: Leandersson, Lindroos (FIN)
30 September 2018; 17:00	3× (yellow card) 4× (suspension)	Report	3× (yellow card) 7× (suspension)	Jane Sandanski Arena, Skopje; Attendance: 2,000; Referees: Leandersson, Lindroos (FIN)

6 October 2018; 16:00	Beşiktaş (Turkey)	27–33	(Portugal) Sporting CP	Recep Topaloğlu Sports Hall, İzmit; Attendance: 700; Referees: Nabokau, Kulik (BLR)
6 October 2018; 16:00	Pribak 6	(15–18)	Ghionea 8	Recep Topaloğlu Sports Hall, İzmit; Attendance: 700; Referees: Nabokau, Kulik (BLR)
6 October 2018; 16:00	3× (yellow card) 2× (suspension) 1× (red card)	Report	1× (yellow card) 1× (suspension) 1× (red card)	Recep Topaloğlu Sports Hall, İzmit; Attendance: 700; Referees: Nabokau, Kulik (BLR)

6 October 2018; 18:00	Tatran Prešov (Slovakia)	27–28	(Russia) Chekhovskiye Medvedi	Tatran Handball Arena, Prešov; Attendance: 2,500; Referees: Harabagiu, Stănescu (ROU)
6 October 2018; 18:00	Číp, Hrstka 5	(13–13)	Kotov, Santalov 5	Tatran Handball Arena, Prešov; Attendance: 2,500; Referees: Harabagiu, Stănescu (ROU)
6 October 2018; 18:00	3× (yellow card) 5× (suspension)	Report	3× (yellow card) 5× (suspension)	Tatran Handball Arena, Prešov; Attendance: 2,500; Referees: Harabagiu, Stănescu (ROU)

7 October 2018; 15:10	Bjerringbro-Silkeborg (Denmark)	33–25	(North Macedonia) Metalurg	Jysk Arena, Silkeborg; Attendance: 1,991; Referees: Herczeg, Südi (HUN)
7 October 2018; 15:10	Hansen 7	(16–14)	Jaganjac 10	Jysk Arena, Silkeborg; Attendance: 1,991; Referees: Herczeg, Südi (HUN)
7 October 2018; 15:10	3× (yellow card) 5× (suspension)	Report	2× (yellow card) 4× (suspension) 2× (red card)	Jysk Arena, Silkeborg; Attendance: 1,991; Referees: Herczeg, Südi (HUN)

13 October 2018; 16:00	Beşiktaş (Turkey)	24–37	(Denmark) Bjerringbro-Silkeborg	Recep Topaloğlu Sports Hall, İzmit; Attendance: 500; Referees: Simone, Monitillo (ITA)
13 October 2018; 16:00	Özbahar, Pribak 5	(12–22)	Hansen, Lassen 9	Recep Topaloğlu Sports Hall, İzmit; Attendance: 500; Referees: Simone, Monitillo (ITA)
13 October 2018; 16:00	3× (yellow card) 6× (suspension)	Report	1× (yellow card) 4× (suspension)	Recep Topaloğlu Sports Hall, İzmit; Attendance: 500; Referees: Simone, Monitillo (ITA)

13 October 2018; 16:00	Chekhovskiye Medvedi (Russia)	33–25	(North Macedonia) Metalurg	Olimpiysky Sport Palace, Chekhov; Attendance: 1,100; Referees: Brunner, Salah (SUI)
13 October 2018; 16:00	Santalov 6	(18–13)	Jaganjac 7	Olimpiysky Sport Palace, Chekhov; Attendance: 1,100; Referees: Brunner, Salah (SUI)
13 October 2018; 16:00	2× (yellow card) 6× (suspension) 1× (red card)	Report	2× (yellow card) 1× (suspension)	Olimpiysky Sport Palace, Chekhov; Attendance: 1,100; Referees: Brunner, Salah (SUI)

13 October 2018; 18:00	Tatran Prešov (Slovakia)	27–30	(Portugal) Sporting CP	Tatran Handball Arena, Prešov; Attendance: 2,100; Referees: Baranowski, Lemanowicz (POL)
13 October 2018; 18:00	Butorac 7	(13–15)	Frankis 10	Tatran Handball Arena, Prešov; Attendance: 2,100; Referees: Baranowski, Lemanowicz (POL)
13 October 2018; 18:00	3× (yellow card) 2× (suspension)	Report	3× (yellow card) 3× (suspension) 1× (red card)	Tatran Handball Arena, Prešov; Attendance: 2,100; Referees: Baranowski, Lemanowicz (POL)

3 November 2018; 19:30	Sporting CP (Portugal)	26–28	(Slovakia) Tatran Prešov	Pavilhão João Rocha, Lisbon; Attendance: 1,292; Referees: Borićić, Marković (SRB)
3 November 2018; 19:30	Ruesga 8	(11–14)	Číp, Rábek 5	Pavilhão João Rocha, Lisbon; Attendance: 1,292; Referees: Borićić, Marković (SRB)
3 November 2018; 19:30	1× (yellow card) 2× (suspension)	Report	2× (yellow card) 5× (suspension)	Pavilhão João Rocha, Lisbon; Attendance: 1,292; Referees: Borićić, Marković (SRB)

4 November 2018; 15:10	Bjerringbro-Silkeborg (Denmark)	34–27	(Turkey) Beşiktaş	Jysk Arena, Silkeborg; Attendance: 1,934; Referees: Leandersson, Lindroos (FIN)
4 November 2018; 15:10	Hansen, Markussen 6	(16–12)	Döne 8	Jysk Arena, Silkeborg; Attendance: 1,934; Referees: Leandersson, Lindroos (FIN)
4 November 2018; 15:10	3× (yellow card) 7× (suspension)	Report	2× (yellow card) 6× (suspension)	Jysk Arena, Silkeborg; Attendance: 1,934; Referees: Leandersson, Lindroos (FIN)

4 November 2018; 17:00	Metalurg (North Macedonia)	25–24	(Russia) Chekhovskiye Medvedi	Boris Trajkovski Sports Center, Skopje; Attendance: 2,000; Referees: Gousko, Repkin (BLR)
4 November 2018; 17:00	Dimitrioski 5	(16–10)	Maslennikov 7	Boris Trajkovski Sports Center, Skopje; Attendance: 2,000; Referees: Gousko, Repkin (BLR)
4 November 2018; 17:00	3× (yellow card) 3× (suspension)	Report	3× (yellow card) 2× (suspension)	Boris Trajkovski Sports Center, Skopje; Attendance: 2,000; Referees: Gousko, Repkin (BLR)

8 November 2018; 17:00	Metalurg (North Macedonia)	24–31	(Portugal) Sporting CP	Boris Trajkovski Sports Center, Skopje; Attendance: 400; Referees: Bounouara, Sami (FRA)
8 November 2018; 17:00	Dimitrioski 5	(18–17)	Ruesga, Valdés 5	Boris Trajkovski Sports Center, Skopje; Attendance: 400; Referees: Bounouara, Sami (FRA)
8 November 2018; 17:00	2× (yellow card) 2× (suspension)	Report	1× (yellow card) 5× (suspension)	Boris Trajkovski Sports Center, Skopje; Attendance: 400; Referees: Bounouara, Sami (FRA)

10 November 2018; 16:00	Chekhovskiye Medvedi (Russia)	24–30	(Denmark) Bjerringbro-Silkeborg	Olimpiysky Sport Palace, Chekhov; Attendance: 1,250; Referees: Panayides, Andreou (CYP)
10 November 2018; 16:00	Santalov 6	(10–16)	N. Nielsen 8	Olimpiysky Sport Palace, Chekhov; Attendance: 1,250; Referees: Panayides, Andreou (CYP)
10 November 2018; 16:00	3× (yellow card) 1× (suspension)	Report	2× (yellow card) 2× (suspension)	Olimpiysky Sport Palace, Chekhov; Attendance: 1,250; Referees: Panayides, Andreou (CYP)

10 November 2018; 18:00	Tatran Prešov (Slovakia)	27–23	(Turkey) Beşiktaş	Tatran Handball Arena, Prešov; Attendance: 1,920; Referees: Cindrić, Gonzurek (CRO)
10 November 2018; 18:00	three players 5	(18–11)	Özbahar 8	Tatran Handball Arena, Prešov; Attendance: 1,920; Referees: Cindrić, Gonzurek (CRO)
10 November 2018; 18:00	2× (yellow card) 1× (suspension)	Report	3× (yellow card) 1× (suspension)	Tatran Handball Arena, Prešov; Attendance: 1,920; Referees: Cindrić, Gonzurek (CRO)

17 November 2018; 16:00	Beşiktaş (Turkey)	23–22	(North Macedonia) Metalurg	Recep Topaloğlu Sports Hall, İzmit; Attendance: 500; Referees: Manea, Iliescu (ROU)
17 November 2018; 16:00	Döne 9	(12–12)	Tankoski 6	Recep Topaloğlu Sports Hall, İzmit; Attendance: 500; Referees: Manea, Iliescu (ROU)
17 November 2018; 16:00	3× (yellow card) 1× (suspension)	Report	2× (yellow card) 1× (suspension)	Recep Topaloğlu Sports Hall, İzmit; Attendance: 500; Referees: Manea, Iliescu (ROU)

17 November 2018; 19:30	Sporting CP (Portugal)	33–31	(Russia) Chekhovskiye Medvedi	Pavilhão João Rocha, Lisbon; Attendance: 1,153; Referees: Covalciuc, Covalciuc (MDA)
17 November 2018; 19:30	Ruesga 8	(14–12)	Santalov 8	Pavilhão João Rocha, Lisbon; Attendance: 1,153; Referees: Covalciuc, Covalciuc (MDA)
17 November 2018; 19:30	1× (yellow card) 3× (suspension)	Report	2× (yellow card) 3× (suspension)	Pavilhão João Rocha, Lisbon; Attendance: 1,153; Referees: Covalciuc, Covalciuc (MDA)

18 November 2018; 13:30	Bjerringbro-Silkeborg (Denmark)	29–30	(Slovakia) Tatran Prešov	Jysk Arena, Silkeborg; Attendance: 1,931; Referees: Schulze, Tönnies (GER)
18 November 2018; 13:30	four players 7	(17–14)	Butorac 9	Jysk Arena, Silkeborg; Attendance: 1,931; Referees: Schulze, Tönnies (GER)
18 November 2018; 13:30	3× (yellow card) 3× (suspension) 1× (red card)	Report	2× (yellow card) 3× (suspension)	Jysk Arena, Silkeborg; Attendance: 1,931; Referees: Schulze, Tönnies (GER)

24 November 2018; 16:00	Chekhovskiye Medvedi (Russia)	38–26	(Slovakia) Tatran Prešov	Olimpiysky Sport Palace, Chekhov; Attendance: 1,100; Referees: Gasmi, Gasmi (FRA)
24 November 2018; 16:00	Kornev, Kuretkov 6	(19–13)	Butorac 7	Olimpiysky Sport Palace, Chekhov; Attendance: 1,100; Referees: Gasmi, Gasmi (FRA)
24 November 2018; 16:00	2× (yellow card) 3× (suspension)	Report	5× (suspension) 1× (red card)	Olimpiysky Sport Palace, Chekhov; Attendance: 1,100; Referees: Gasmi, Gasmi (FRA)

24 November 2018; 17:30	Metalurg (North Macedonia)	29–33	(Denmark) Bjerringbro-Silkeborg	Boris Trajkovski Sports Center, Skopje; Attendance: 900; Referees: Bolic, Hurich (AUT)
24 November 2018; 17:30	Spende 8	(12–15)	Lassen 8	Boris Trajkovski Sports Center, Skopje; Attendance: 900; Referees: Bolic, Hurich (AUT)
24 November 2018; 17:30	2× (yellow card) 4× (suspension)	Report	1× (yellow card) 3× (suspension)	Boris Trajkovski Sports Center, Skopje; Attendance: 900; Referees: Bolic, Hurich (AUT)

24 November 2018; 19:30	Sporting CP (Portugal)	34–28	(Turkey) Beşiktaş	Pavilhão João Rocha, Lisbon; Attendance: 1,520; Referees: Herceg, Südi (HUN)
24 November 2018; 19:30	Ruesga 7	(20–16)	Pribak 10	Pavilhão João Rocha, Lisbon; Attendance: 1,520; Referees: Herceg, Südi (HUN)
24 November 2018; 19:30	2× (yellow card) 5× (suspension)	Report	3× (yellow card) 6× (suspension) 1× (red card)	Pavilhão João Rocha, Lisbon; Attendance: 1,520; Referees: Herceg, Südi (HUN)

1 December 2018; 14:00	Beşiktaş (Turkey)	27–30	(Russia) Chekhovskiye Medvedi	Recep Topaloğlu Sports Hall, İzmit; Attendance: 1,000; Referees: Schulze, Tönnies (GER)
1 December 2018; 14:00	Lasica 6	(17–17)	Kosorotov 9	Recep Topaloğlu Sports Hall, İzmit; Attendance: 1,000; Referees: Schulze, Tönnies (GER)
1 December 2018; 14:00	3× (yellow card) 5× (suspension)	Report	3× (yellow card) 4× (suspension)	Recep Topaloğlu Sports Hall, İzmit; Attendance: 1,000; Referees: Schulze, Tönnies (GER)

1 December 2018; 19:30	Tatran Prešov (Slovakia)	30–24	(North Macedonia) Metalurg	Tatran Handball Arena, Prešov; Attendance: 1,500; Referees: Katsikis, Michailidis (GRE)
1 December 2018; 19:30	Hrstka 8	(15–13)	Pučnik 7	Tatran Handball Arena, Prešov; Attendance: 1,500; Referees: Katsikis, Michailidis (GRE)
1 December 2018; 19:30	2× (yellow card) 2× (suspension)	Report	3× (yellow card) 5× (suspension)	Tatran Handball Arena, Prešov; Attendance: 1,500; Referees: Katsikis, Michailidis (GRE)

2 December 2018; 16:50	Bjerringbro-Silkeborg (Denmark)	29–28	(Portugal) Sporting CP	Jysk Arena, Silkeborg; Attendance: 2,012; Referees: Lah, Sok (SLO)
2 December 2018; 16:50	Nielsen 7	(16–16)	four players 5	Jysk Arena, Silkeborg; Attendance: 2,012; Referees: Lah, Sok (SLO)
2 December 2018; 16:50	2× (yellow card) 3× (suspension)	Report	1× (yellow card) 7× (suspension)	Jysk Arena, Silkeborg; Attendance: 2,012; Referees: Lah, Sok (SLO)

=== Group D ===
Pos	Team	Pld	W	D	L	GF	GA	GD	Pts	Qualification
1	(Romania) Dinamo București	10	7	0	3	293	280	+13	14 (Note: Dinamo 52–50 Płock)	Playoffs
2	(Poland) Wisła Płock	10	7	0	3	278	250	+28	14	Playoffs
3	(Norway) Elverum Håndball	10	6	1	3	278	272	+6	13	
4	(Spain) Ademar León	10	5	2	3	252	251	+1	12	
5	(Finland) Riihimäki Cocks	10	2	2	6	246	269	−23	6	
6	(Switzerland) Wacker Thun	10	0	1	9	268	293	−25	1	

Source: EHF
Notes:

12 September 2018; 18:15	Riihimäki Cocks (Finland)	19–19	(Spain) Ademar León	Energia Areena, Vantaa; Attendance: 500; Referees: Andorka, Hucker (HUN)
12 September 2018; 18:15	Rönnberg 8	(13–11)	Mošić 5	Energia Areena, Vantaa; Attendance: 500; Referees: Andorka, Hucker (HUN)
12 September 2018; 18:15	2× (yellow card) 1× (suspension)	Report	3× (yellow card)	Energia Areena, Vantaa; Attendance: 500; Referees: Andorka, Hucker (HUN)

12 September 2018; 19:30	Dinamo București (Romania)	26–24	(Norway) Elverum Håndball	Dinamo Polyvalent Hall, Bucharest; Attendance: 1,500; Referees: Mandák, Rudinský (SVK)
12 September 2018; 19:30	Bannour 5	(12–11)	Sandell 7	Dinamo Polyvalent Hall, Bucharest; Attendance: 1,500; Referees: Mandák, Rudinský (SVK)
12 September 2018; 19:30	3× (yellow card) 2× (suspension)	Report	3× (yellow card) 3× (suspension)	Dinamo Polyvalent Hall, Bucharest; Attendance: 1,500; Referees: Mandák, Rudinský (SVK)

16 September 2018; 19:00	Wisła Płock (Poland)	34–24	(Switzerland) Wacker Thun	Orlen Arena, Płock; Attendance: 2,150; Referees: Madsen, Mortensen (DEN)
16 September 2018; 19:00	Mlakar 8	(18–13)	Delhees 7	Orlen Arena, Płock; Attendance: 2,150; Referees: Madsen, Mortensen (DEN)
16 September 2018; 19:00	2× (yellow card) 2× (suspension)	Report	1× (yellow card) 3× (suspension)	Orlen Arena, Płock; Attendance: 2,150; Referees: Madsen, Mortensen (DEN)

20 September 2018; 20:00	Wacker Thun (Switzerland)	26–26	(Finland) Riihimäki Cocks	Mobiliar Arena, Gümlingen; Attendance: 520; Referees: Mitrevski, Todorovski (MKD)
20 September 2018; 20:00	Holm, Suter 6	(11–15)	Rönnberg 7	Mobiliar Arena, Gümlingen; Attendance: 520; Referees: Mitrevski, Todorovski (MKD)
20 September 2018; 20:00	4× (yellow card) 7× (suspension)	Report	3× (yellow card) 6× (suspension)	Mobiliar Arena, Gümlingen; Attendance: 520; Referees: Mitrevski, Todorovski (MKD)

22 September 2018; 19:30	Ademar León (Spain)	31–28	(Romania) Dinamo București	Palacio de los Deportes de León, León; Attendance: 2,500; Referees: Caçador, Nicolau (POR)
22 September 2018; 19:30	three players 5	(12–14)	Gavriloaia, Negru 4	Palacio de los Deportes de León, León; Attendance: 2,500; Referees: Caçador, Nicolau (POR)
22 September 2018; 19:30	4× (yellow card) 3× (suspension)	Report	1× (yellow card) 5× (suspension)	Palacio de los Deportes de León, León; Attendance: 2,500; Referees: Caçador, Nicolau (POR)

23 September 2018; 18:10	Elverum Håndball (Norway)	28–30	(Poland) Wisła Płock	Terningen Arena, Elverum; Attendance: 1,972; Referees: Baumgart, Wild (GER)
23 September 2018; 18:10	Guðjónsson 9	(15–13)	Daszek 6	Terningen Arena, Elverum; Attendance: 1,972; Referees: Baumgart, Wild (GER)
23 September 2018; 18:10	1× (yellow card) 5× (suspension)	Report	2× (yellow card) 7× (suspension)	Terningen Arena, Elverum; Attendance: 1,972; Referees: Baumgart, Wild (GER)

26 September 2018; 18:00	Dinamo București (Romania)	35–34	(Switzerland) Wacker Thun	Dinamo Polyvalent Hall, Bucharest; Attendance: 1,100; Referees: Panayides, Andreou (CYP)
26 September 2018; 18:00	Bannour 9	(19–14)	Delhees 10	Dinamo Polyvalent Hall, Bucharest; Attendance: 1,100; Referees: Panayides, Andreou (CYP)
26 September 2018; 18:00	2× (yellow card) 3× (suspension)	Report	3× (yellow card) 6× (suspension)	Dinamo Polyvalent Hall, Bucharest; Attendance: 1,100; Referees: Panayides, Andreou (CYP)

26 September 2018; 19:00	Wisła Płock (Poland)	34–18	(Finland) Riihimäki Cocks	Orlen Arena, Płock; Attendance: 2,050; Referees: Schulze, Tönnies (GER)
26 September 2018; 19:00	Toledo 8	(16–10)	Tamminen 6	Orlen Arena, Płock; Attendance: 2,050; Referees: Schulze, Tönnies (GER)
26 September 2018; 19:00	2× (yellow card) 6× (suspension)	Report	3× (yellow card) 4× (suspension)	Orlen Arena, Płock; Attendance: 2,050; Referees: Schulze, Tönnies (GER)

30 September 2018; 18:10	Elverum Håndball (Norway)	30–25	(Spain) Ademar León	Terningen Arena, Elverum; Attendance: 2,096; Referees: Hermann, Madsen (DEN)
30 September 2018; 18:10	Poklar, Sandell 7	(18–13)	Marqués 6	Terningen Arena, Elverum; Attendance: 2,096; Referees: Hermann, Madsen (DEN)
30 September 2018; 18:10	3× (yellow card) 2× (suspension)	Report	3× (yellow card) 1× (suspension)	Terningen Arena, Elverum; Attendance: 2,096; Referees: Hermann, Madsen (DEN)

3 October 2018; 18:15	Riihimäki Cocks (Finland)	31–32	(Romania) Dinamo București	Energia Areena, Vantaa; Attendance: 550; Referees: Cindrić, Gonzurek (CRO)
3 October 2018; 18:15	Rönnberg 11	(17–15)	Bannour 6	Energia Areena, Vantaa; Attendance: 550; Referees: Cindrić, Gonzurek (CRO)
3 October 2018; 18:15	1× (yellow card) 3× (suspension)	Report	2× (yellow card) 5× (suspension)	Energia Areena, Vantaa; Attendance: 550; Referees: Cindrić, Gonzurek (CRO)

6 October 2018; 17:30	Wacker Thun (Switzerland)	29–30	(Norway) Elverum Håndball	Mobiliar Arena, Gümlingen; Attendance: 880; Referees: Bolic, Hurich (AUT)
6 October 2018; 17:30	Delhees, Suter 6	(13–16)	Pettersen 6	Mobiliar Arena, Gümlingen; Attendance: 880; Referees: Bolic, Hurich (AUT)
6 October 2018; 17:30	2× (yellow card) 7× (suspension)	Report	2× (yellow card) 2× (suspension)	Mobiliar Arena, Gümlingen; Attendance: 880; Referees: Bolic, Hurich (AUT)

6 October 2018; 19:30	Ademar León (Spain)	27–24	(Poland) Wisła Płock	Palacio de los Deportes de León, León; Attendance: 3,000; Referees: Opava, Válek (CZE)
6 October 2018; 19:30	Mošić 9	(15–9)	Sulić, Toledo 5	Palacio de los Deportes de León, León; Attendance: 3,000; Referees: Opava, Válek (CZE)
6 October 2018; 19:30	2× (yellow card) 1× (suspension)	Report	3× (yellow card) 4× (suspension)	Palacio de los Deportes de León, León; Attendance: 3,000; Referees: Opava, Válek (CZE)

13 October 2018; 17:30	Wacker Thun (Switzerland)	25–26	(Spain) Ademar León	Mobiliar Arena, Gümlingen; Attendance: 1,220; Referees: Baumgart, Wild (GER)
13 October 2018; 17:30	Suter 6	(12–15)	three players 5	Mobiliar Arena, Gümlingen; Attendance: 1,220; Referees: Baumgart, Wild (GER)
13 October 2018; 17:30	3× (yellow card) 3× (suspension)	Report	2× (yellow card) 2× (suspension)	Mobiliar Arena, Gümlingen; Attendance: 1,220; Referees: Baumgart, Wild (GER)

14 October 2018; 18:10	Elverum Håndball (Norway)	28–27	(Finland) Riihimäki Cocks	Terningen Arena, Elverum; Attendance: 1,940; Referees: Kurtagic, Wetterwik (SWE)
14 October 2018; 18:10	Westby 7	(15–14)	Rönnberg 7	Terningen Arena, Elverum; Attendance: 1,940; Referees: Kurtagic, Wetterwik (SWE)
14 October 2018; 18:10	3× (yellow card) 3× (suspension)	Report	2× (yellow card) 2× (suspension)	Terningen Arena, Elverum; Attendance: 1,940; Referees: Kurtagic, Wetterwik (SWE)

14 October 2018; 21:00	Dinamo București (Romania)	24–21	(Poland) Wisła Płock	Dinamo Polyvalent Hall, Bucharest; Attendance: 2,326; Referees: Pichon, Reveret (FRA)
14 October 2018; 21:00	Bannour 7	(13–10)	Žabič 5	Dinamo Polyvalent Hall, Bucharest; Attendance: 2,326; Referees: Pichon, Reveret (FRA)
14 October 2018; 21:00	2× (yellow card) 10× (suspension)	Report	2× (yellow card) 5× (suspension) 1× (red card)	Dinamo Polyvalent Hall, Bucharest; Attendance: 2,326; Referees: Pichon, Reveret (FRA)

3 November 2018; 16:00	Riihimäki Cocks (Finland)	25–28	(Norway) Elverum Håndball	Energia Areena, Vantaa; Attendance: 600; Referees: Ershov, Pavliukov (RUS)
3 November 2018; 16:00	Tamminen 7	(12–15)	Westby 10	Energia Areena, Vantaa; Attendance: 600; Referees: Ershov, Pavliukov (RUS)
3 November 2018; 16:00	2× (yellow card) 5× (suspension)	Report	2× (yellow card) 5× (suspension)	Energia Areena, Vantaa; Attendance: 600; Referees: Ershov, Pavliukov (RUS)

3 November 2018; 18:00	Wisła Płock (Poland)	29–28	(Romania) Dinamo București	Orlen Arena, Płock; Attendance: 3,000; Referees: Gasmi, Gasmi (FRA)
3 November 2018; 18:00	Daszek 7	(14–12)	Zulfić 6	Orlen Arena, Płock; Attendance: 3,000; Referees: Gasmi, Gasmi (FRA)
3 November 2018; 18:00	2× (yellow card) 2× (suspension) 1× (red card)	Report	2× (yellow card) 9× (suspension) 1× (red card)	Orlen Arena, Płock; Attendance: 3,000; Referees: Gasmi, Gasmi (FRA)

3 November 2018; 20:00	Ademar León (Spain)	24–21	(Switzerland) Wacker Thun	Palacio de los Deportes de León, León; Attendance: 2,550; Referees: Bonifert, Oláh (HUN)
3 November 2018; 20:00	Pešić 5	(14–12)	Wyttenbach 7	Palacio de los Deportes de León, León; Attendance: 2,550; Referees: Bonifert, Oláh (HUN)
3 November 2018; 20:00	2× (yellow card) 3× (suspension)	Report	1× (yellow card) 8× (suspension) 1× (red card)	Palacio de los Deportes de León, León; Attendance: 2,550; Referees: Bonifert, Oláh (HUN)

8 November 2018; 18:00	Dinamo București (Romania)	35–30	(Spain) Ademar León	Dinamo Polyvalent Hall, Bucharest; Attendance: 1,800; Referees: Konjičanin, Konjičanin (BIH)
8 November 2018; 18:00	Bannour 11	(18–15)	López 11	Dinamo Polyvalent Hall, Bucharest; Attendance: 1,800; Referees: Konjičanin, Konjičanin (BIH)
8 November 2018; 18:00	2× (yellow card) 6× (suspension)	Report	1× (yellow card) 3× (suspension)	Dinamo Polyvalent Hall, Bucharest; Attendance: 1,800; Referees: Konjičanin, Konjičanin (BIH)

10 November 2018; 18:00	Wisła Płock (Poland)	30–28	(Norway) Elverum Håndball	Orlen Arena, Płock; Attendance: 3,500; Referees: Mitrevski, Todorovski (MKD)
10 November 2018; 18:00	Mlakar 8	(17–15)	Guðjónsson 7	Orlen Arena, Płock; Attendance: 3,500; Referees: Mitrevski, Todorovski (MKD)
10 November 2018; 18:00	4× (yellow card) 6× (suspension)	Report	2× (yellow card) 1× (suspension)	Orlen Arena, Płock; Attendance: 3,500; Referees: Mitrevski, Todorovski (MKD)

11 November 2018; 15:15	Riihimäki Cocks (Finland)	31–29	(Switzerland) Wacker Thun	Energia Areena, Vantaa; Attendance: 887; Referees: Katsikis, Michailidis (GRE)
11 November 2018; 15:15	Rönnberg 10	(14–18)	three players 5	Energia Areena, Vantaa; Attendance: 887; Referees: Katsikis, Michailidis (GRE)
11 November 2018; 15:15	3× (yellow card) 6× (suspension)	Report	2× (yellow card) 5× (suspension)	Energia Areena, Vantaa; Attendance: 887; Referees: Katsikis, Michailidis (GRE)

15 November 2018; 20:00	Wacker Thun (Switzerland)	23–25	(Poland) Wisła Płock	Mobiliar Arena, Gümlingen; Attendance: 960; Referees: Ershov, Pavliukov (RUS)
15 November 2018; 20:00	Wyttenbach 7	(13–14)	Daszek 5	Mobiliar Arena, Gümlingen; Attendance: 960; Referees: Ershov, Pavliukov (RUS)
15 November 2018; 20:00	3× (yellow card) 5× (suspension)	Report	4× (yellow card) 4× (suspension) 1× (red card)	Mobiliar Arena, Gümlingen; Attendance: 960; Referees: Ershov, Pavliukov (RUS)

17 November 2018; 19:30	Ademar León (Spain)	23–20	(Finland) Riihimäki Cocks	Palacio de los Deportes de León, León; Attendance: 3,000; Referees: Boričić, Marković (SRB)
17 November 2018; 19:30	Marqués 7	(14–11)	Rönnberg 7	Palacio de los Deportes de León, León; Attendance: 3,000; Referees: Boričić, Marković (SRB)
17 November 2018; 19:30	2× (yellow card) 2× (suspension)	Report	3× (yellow card) 3× (suspension)	Palacio de los Deportes de León, León; Attendance: 3,000; Referees: Boričić, Marković (SRB)

18 November 2018; 18:10	Elverum Håndball (Norway)	29–28	(Romania) Dinamo București	Terningen Arena, Elverum; Attendance: 2,438; Referees: Horváth, Marton (HUN)
18 November 2018; 18:10	Westby 8	(12–15)	Gavriloaia, Zulfić 6	Terningen Arena, Elverum; Attendance: 2,438; Referees: Horváth, Marton (HUN)
18 November 2018; 18:10	3× (yellow card) 4× (suspension)	Report	2× (yellow card) 7× (suspension)	Terningen Arena, Elverum; Attendance: 2,438; Referees: Horváth, Marton (HUN)

21 November 2018; 19:30	Dinamo București (Romania)	24–22	(Finland) Riihimäki Cocks	Dinamo Polyvalent Hall, Bucharest; Attendance: 2,450; Referees: Baumgart, Wild (GER)
21 November 2018; 19:30	Descat 7	(13–12)	Rönnberg 9	Dinamo Polyvalent Hall, Bucharest; Attendance: 2,450; Referees: Baumgart, Wild (GER)
21 November 2018; 19:30	1× (yellow card) 6× (suspension)	Report	3× (yellow card) 6× (suspension)	Dinamo Polyvalent Hall, Bucharest; Attendance: 2,450; Referees: Baumgart, Wild (GER)

24 November 2018; 16:00	Wisła Płock (Poland)	25–23	(Spain) Ademar León	Orlen Arena, Płock; Attendance: 3,800; Referees: Freitas, Carvalho (POR)
24 November 2018; 16:00	Toledo 7	(9–10)	López 6	Orlen Arena, Płock; Attendance: 3,800; Referees: Freitas, Carvalho (POR)
24 November 2018; 16:00	1× (yellow card) 4× (suspension)	Report	4× (yellow card) 4× (suspension) 1× (red card)	Orlen Arena, Płock; Attendance: 3,800; Referees: Freitas, Carvalho (POR)

25 November 2018; 18:10	Elverum Håndball (Norway)	29–28	(Switzerland) Wacker Thun	Terningen Arena, Elverum; Attendance: 2,273; Referees: Mandák, Rudinský (SVK)
25 November 2018; 18:10	Sandell 9	(15–16)	Caspar 5	Terningen Arena, Elverum; Attendance: 2,273; Referees: Mandák, Rudinský (SVK)
25 November 2018; 18:10	2× (yellow card) 4× (suspension)	Report	1× (yellow card) 7× (suspension)	Terningen Arena, Elverum; Attendance: 2,273; Referees: Mandák, Rudinský (SVK)

28 November 2018; 18:15	Riihimäki Cocks (Finland)	27–26	(Poland) Wisła Płock	Energia Areena, Vantaa; Attendance: 400; Referees: Panayides, Andreou (CYP)
28 November 2018; 18:15	Rönnberg 8	(10–15)	Daszek 8	Energia Areena, Vantaa; Attendance: 400; Referees: Panayides, Andreou (CYP)
28 November 2018; 18:15	3× (yellow card) 3× (suspension)	Report	3× (yellow card) 2× (suspension)	Energia Areena, Vantaa; Attendance: 400; Referees: Panayides, Andreou (CYP)

29 November 2018; 20:00	Wacker Thun (Switzerland)	29–33	(Romania) Dinamo București	Mobiliar Arena, Gümlingen; Attendance: 1,380; Referees: Baďura, Ondogrecula (SVK)
29 November 2018; 20:00	Lanz 6	(13–14)	Bannour 6	Mobiliar Arena, Gümlingen; Attendance: 1,380; Referees: Baďura, Ondogrecula (SVK)
29 November 2018; 20:00	2× (yellow card) 4× (suspension)	Report	2× (yellow card) 4× (suspension)	Mobiliar Arena, Gümlingen; Attendance: 1,380; Referees: Baďura, Ondogrecula (SVK)

1 December 2018; 20:00	Ademar León (Spain)	24–24	(Norway) Elverum Håndball	Palacio de los Deportes de León, León; Attendance: 2,200; Referees: Brkic, Jusufhodzic (AUT)
1 December 2018; 20:00	Marqués 6	(14–13)	Pettersen 6	Palacio de los Deportes de León, León; Attendance: 2,200; Referees: Brkic, Jusufhodzic (AUT)
1 December 2018; 20:00	3× (yellow card) 4× (suspension)	Report	3× (yellow card) 5× (suspension)	Palacio de los Deportes de León, León; Attendance: 2,200; Referees: Brkic, Jusufhodzic (AUT)

== Playoffs ==
The top two teams from Groups C and D contested a playoff to determine the two sides advancing to the knockout phase. The winners of each group will face the runners-up of the other group in a two-legged tie.

Team 1	Agg.	Team 2	1st leg	2nd leg
Sporting CP (Portugal)	59–57	(Romania) Dinamo București	32–31	27–26
Wisła Płock (Poland)	49–46	(Denmark) Bjerringbro-Silkeborg	22–26	27–20

=== Matches ===
23 February 2019; 18:30	Sporting CP (Portugal)	32–31	(Romania) Dinamo București	Pavilhão João Rocha, Lisbon; Attendance: 2,660; Referees: Schulze, Tönnies (GER)
23 February 2019; 18:30	Nikčević 11	(14–14)	Bannour, Descat 6	Pavilhão João Rocha, Lisbon; Attendance: 2,660; Referees: Schulze, Tönnies (GER)
23 February 2019; 18:30	2× (yellow card) 4× (suspension)	Report	2× (yellow card) 6× (suspension)	Pavilhão João Rocha, Lisbon; Attendance: 2,660; Referees: Schulze, Tönnies (GER)

28 February 2019; 20:00	Dinamo București (Romania)	26–27	(Portugal) Sporting CP	Dinamo Polyvalent Hall, Bucharest; Attendance: 2,538; Referees: Mažeika, Gatelis (LTU)
28 February 2019; 20:00	Gavriloaia, Szász 6	(15–11)	Frankis 7	Dinamo Polyvalent Hall, Bucharest; Attendance: 2,538; Referees: Mažeika, Gatelis (LTU)
28 February 2019; 20:00	3× (yellow card) 5× (suspension)	Report	3× (yellow card) 5× (suspension)	Dinamo Polyvalent Hall, Bucharest; Attendance: 2,538; Referees: Mažeika, Gatelis (LTU)

Sporting CP won 59–57 on aggregate.

23 February 2019; 18:00	Wisła Płock (Poland)	22–26	(Denmark) Bjerringbro-Silkeborg	Orlen Arena, Płock; Attendance: 3,850; Referees: Herceg, Südi (HUN)
23 February 2019; 18:00	Krajewski, Racoțea 4	(14–14)	Skube 9	Orlen Arena, Płock; Attendance: 3,850; Referees: Herceg, Südi (HUN)
23 February 2019; 18:00	1× (yellow card) 4× (suspension)	Report	3× (yellow card) 3× (suspension)	Orlen Arena, Płock; Attendance: 3,850; Referees: Herceg, Südi (HUN)

3 March 2019; 15:10	Bjerringbro-Silkeborg (Denmark)	20–27	(Poland) Wisła Płock	Jysk Arena, Silkeborg; Attendance: 2,213; Referees: Vešović, Mitrović (MNE)
3 March 2019; 15:10	Nøddesbo 4	(15–13)	Mlakar 8	Jysk Arena, Silkeborg; Attendance: 2,213; Referees: Vešović, Mitrović (MNE)
3 March 2019; 15:10	2× (yellow card) 4× (suspension)	Report	3× (yellow card) 5× (suspension) 2× (red card)	Jysk Arena, Silkeborg; Attendance: 2,213; Referees: Vešović, Mitrović (MNE)

Wisła Płock won 49–46 on aggregate.
