= 2018–19 EHF Champions League knockout stage =

This article describes the knockout stage of the 2018–19 EHF Champions League.

== Qualified teams ==
The top six placed teams from each of the two groups advanced to the knockout stage.

Group	Qualified for quarterfinals	Qualified for Round of 16				
Group	First place	Second place	Third place	Fourth place	Fifth place	Sixth place
A	(Spain) Barça Lassa	(Hungary) Telekom Veszprém	(North Macedonia) RK Vardar	(Poland) PGE Vive Kielce	(Germany) Rhein-Neckar Löwen	(Belarus) Meshkov Brest
B	(France) Paris Saint-Germain	(Hungary) MOL-Pick Szeged	(Germany) Flensburg-Handewitt	(France) HBC Nantes	(Ukraine) Motor Zaporizhzhia	(Croatia) PPD Zagreb
Playoff winners	(Portugal) Sporting CP (Poland) Wisła Płock					

== Format ==
12 teams played home and away in the first knock-out phase, with the 10 teams qualified from groups A and B and the two teams qualified from groups C and D. After that, the six winners of these matches in the first knock-out phase joined with the winners of groups A and B to play home and away for the right to play in the final four.

== Round of 16 ==
=== Overview ===
Team 1	Agg.	Team 2	1st leg	2nd leg
Sporting CP (Portugal)	57–65	(Hungary) Telekom Veszprém	28–30	29–35
Wisła Płock (Poland)	36–45	(Hungary) MOL-Pick Szeged	20–22	16–23
PPD Zagreb (Croatia)	48–59	(North Macedonia) RK Vardar	18–27	30–32
Meshkov Brest (Belarus)	48–60	(Germany) Flensburg-Handewitt	28–30	20–30
Motor Zaporizhzhia (Ukraine)	62–67	(Poland) PGE Vive Kielce	33–33	29–34
Rhein-Neckar Löwen (Germany)	61–62	(France) HBC Nantes	34–32	27–30

=== Matches ===
24 March 2019; 18:00	Sporting CP (Portugal)	28–30	(Hungary) Telekom Veszprém	Pavilhão João Rocha, Lisbon; Attendance: 2,903; Referees: Elíasson, Pálsson (ISL)
24 March 2019; 18:00	Ghionea 7	(15–14)	Nenadić 9	Pavilhão João Rocha, Lisbon; Attendance: 2,903; Referees: Elíasson, Pálsson (ISL)
24 March 2019; 18:00	2× (yellow card) 4× (suspension)	Report	3× (yellow card) 3× (suspension)	Pavilhão João Rocha, Lisbon; Attendance: 2,903; Referees: Elíasson, Pálsson (ISL)

30 March 2019; 17:30	Telekom Veszprém (Hungary)	35–29	(Portugal) Sporting CP	Veszprém Aréna, Veszprém; Attendance: 5,019; Referees: Brunner, Salah (SUI)
30 March 2019; 17:30	Štrlek 7	(17–14)	three players 6	Veszprém Aréna, Veszprém; Attendance: 5,019; Referees: Brunner, Salah (SUI)
30 March 2019; 17:30	2× (yellow card) 2× (suspension)	Report	2× (yellow card) 3× (suspension)	Veszprém Aréna, Veszprém; Attendance: 5,019; Referees: Brunner, Salah (SUI)

Telekom Veszprém won 65–57 on aggregate.

24 March 2019; 16:00	Wisła Płock (Poland)	20–22	(Hungary) MOL-Pick Szeged	Orlen Arena, Płock; Attendance: 4,000; Referees: Jørum, Kleven (NOR)
24 March 2019; 16:00	Daszek, Toledo 5	(10–10)	Cañellas 6	Orlen Arena, Płock; Attendance: 4,000; Referees: Jørum, Kleven (NOR)
24 March 2019; 16:00	2× (yellow card) 4× (suspension)	Report	2× (yellow card) 1× (suspension)	Orlen Arena, Płock; Attendance: 4,000; Referees: Jørum, Kleven (NOR)

31 March 2019; 17:00	MOL-Pick Szeged (Hungary)	23–16	(Poland) Wisła Płock	Városi Sportcsarnok, Szeged; Attendance: 3,200; Referees: Sondors, Līcis (LAT)
31 March 2019; 17:00	Bánhidi 6	(13–8)	Gębala 5	Városi Sportcsarnok, Szeged; Attendance: 3,200; Referees: Sondors, Līcis (LAT)
31 March 2019; 17:00	2× (yellow card) 3× (suspension)	Report	2× (yellow card) 3× (suspension)	Városi Sportcsarnok, Szeged; Attendance: 3,200; Referees: Sondors, Līcis (LAT)

MOL-Pick Szeged won 45–36 on aggregate.

23 March 2019; 20:30	PPD Zagreb (Croatia)	18–27	(North Macedonia) RK Vardar	Arena Zagreb, Zagreb; Attendance: 7,836; Referees: Geipel, Helbig (GER)
23 March 2019; 20:30	Mandić 5	(6–14)	Karačić, Krištopāns 5	Arena Zagreb, Zagreb; Attendance: 7,836; Referees: Geipel, Helbig (GER)
23 March 2019; 20:30	1× (yellow card) 4× (suspension) 1× (red card)	Report	1× (suspension)	Arena Zagreb, Zagreb; Attendance: 7,836; Referees: Geipel, Helbig (GER)

30 March 2019; 19:30	RK Vardar (North Macedonia)	32–30	(Croatia) PPD Zagreb	Jane Sandanski Arena, Skopje; Attendance: 5,500; Referees: Madsen, Mortensen (DEN)
30 March 2019; 19:30	Čupić 9	(19–13)	Horvat 11	Jane Sandanski Arena, Skopje; Attendance: 5,500; Referees: Madsen, Mortensen (DEN)
30 March 2019; 19:30	1× (yellow card) 1× (suspension)	Report	3× (yellow card) 7× (suspension)	Jane Sandanski Arena, Skopje; Attendance: 5,500; Referees: Madsen, Mortensen (DEN)

RK Vardar won 59–48 on aggregate.

23 March 2019; 18:00	Meshkov Brest (Belarus)	28–30	(Germany) Flensburg-Handewitt	Sportshall Victoria, Brest; Attendance: 3,500; Referees: Kurtagic, Wetterwik (SWE)
23 March 2019; 18:00	Đorđić 6	(14–14)	Schmidt 8	Sportshall Victoria, Brest; Attendance: 3,500; Referees: Kurtagic, Wetterwik (SWE)
23 March 2019; 18:00	1× (yellow card) 2× (suspension)	Report	2× (yellow card) 7× (suspension)	Sportshall Victoria, Brest; Attendance: 3,500; Referees: Kurtagic, Wetterwik (SWE)

31 March 2019; 19:00	Flensburg-Handewitt (Germany)	30–20	(Belarus) Meshkov Brest	Flens-Arena, Flensburg; Attendance: 4,709; Referees: Pavićević, Ražnatović (MNE)
31 March 2019; 19:00	Wanne 7	(14–8)	Ðukić 6	Flens-Arena, Flensburg; Attendance: 4,709; Referees: Pavićević, Ražnatović (MNE)
31 March 2019; 19:00	2× (yellow card) 3× (suspension)	Report	1× (yellow card) 4× (suspension)	Flens-Arena, Flensburg; Attendance: 4,709; Referees: Pavićević, Ražnatović (MNE)

Flensburg-Handewitt won 60–48 on aggregate.

23 March 2019; 17:30	Motor Zaporizhzhia (Ukraine)	33–33	(Poland) PGE Vive Kielce	Yunost Sport Hall, Zaporizhzhia; Attendance: 3,500; Referees: Brunovský, Čanda (SVK)
23 March 2019; 17:30	Kozakevych 9	(16–16)	Cindrić, Dujshebaev 8	Yunost Sport Hall, Zaporizhzhia; Attendance: 3,500; Referees: Brunovský, Čanda (SVK)
23 March 2019; 17:30	3× (yellow card)	Report	3× (yellow card) 2× (suspension)	Yunost Sport Hall, Zaporizhzhia; Attendance: 3,500; Referees: Brunovský, Čanda (SVK)

30 March 2019; 16:00	PGE Vive Kielce (Poland)	33–29	(Ukraine) Motor Zaporizhzhia	Hala Legionów, Kielce; Attendance: 3,900; Referees: Caçador, Nicolau (POR)
30 March 2019; 16:00	Dujshebaev, Kulesh 6	(17–12)	Kozakevych 7	Hala Legionów, Kielce; Attendance: 3,900; Referees: Caçador, Nicolau (POR)
30 March 2019; 16:00	3× (yellow card) 2× (suspension)	Report	1× (yellow card) 4× (suspension)	Hala Legionów, Kielce; Attendance: 3,900; Referees: Caçador, Nicolau (POR)

PGE Vive Kielce won 67–62 on aggregate.

20 March 2019; 19:00	Rhein-Neckar Löwen (Germany)	34–32	(France) HBC Nantes	SAP Arena, Mannheim; Attendance: 5,417; Referees: Marín, García (ESP)
20 March 2019; 19:00	Kohlbacher 11	(18–16)	Gurbindo, Nyokas 7	SAP Arena, Mannheim; Attendance: 5,417; Referees: Marín, García (ESP)
20 March 2019; 19:00	3× (yellow card) 4× (suspension)	Report	1× (yellow card) 1× (suspension)	SAP Arena, Mannheim; Attendance: 5,417; Referees: Marín, García (ESP)

30 March 2019; 19:00	HBC Nantes (France)	30–27	(Germany) Rhein-Neckar Löwen	Palais des Sports de Beaulieu, Nantes; Attendance: 5,902; Referees: Baranowski, Lemanowicz (POL)
30 March 2019; 19:00	Lagarde, Rivera Folch 8	(14–14)	three players 5	Palais des Sports de Beaulieu, Nantes; Attendance: 5,902; Referees: Baranowski, Lemanowicz (POL)
30 March 2019; 19:00	3× (yellow card) 3× (suspension)	Report	3× (yellow card) 2× (suspension)	Palais des Sports de Beaulieu, Nantes; Attendance: 5,902; Referees: Baranowski, Lemanowicz (POL)

HBC Nantes won 62–61 on aggregate.

== Quarterfinals ==
=== Overview ===
Team 1	Agg.	Team 2	1st leg	2nd leg
HBC Nantes (France)	51–61	(Spain) Barça Lassa	25–32	26–29
PGE Vive Kielce (Poland)	60–59	(France) Paris Saint-Germain	34–24	26–35
Flensburg-Handewitt (Germany)	47–57	(Hungary) Telekom Veszprém	22–28	25–29
RK Vardar (North Macedonia)	56–52	(Hungary) MOL-Pick Szeged	31–23	25–29

=== Matches ===
24 April 2019; 20:45	HBC Nantes (France)	25–32	(Spain) Barça Lassa	Palais des Sports de Beaulieu, Nantes; Attendance: 5,657; Referees: Gubica, Milošević (CRO)
24 April 2019; 20:45	Rivera 8	(12–16)	Fabregas 9	Palais des Sports de Beaulieu, Nantes; Attendance: 5,657; Referees: Gubica, Milošević (CRO)
24 April 2019; 20:45	1× (yellow card) 3× (suspension)	Report	3× (yellow card) 4× (suspension)	Palais des Sports de Beaulieu, Nantes; Attendance: 5,657; Referees: Gubica, Milošević (CRO)

4 May 2019; 19:30	Barça Lassa (Spain)	29–26	(France) HBC Nantes	Palau Blaugrana, Barcelona; Attendance: 5,278; Referees: Gjeding, Hansen (DEN)
4 May 2019; 19:30	Andersson 5	(17–14)	Tournat 5	Palau Blaugrana, Barcelona; Attendance: 5,278; Referees: Gjeding, Hansen (DEN)
4 May 2019; 19:30	1× (yellow card) 3× (suspension)	Report	1× (yellow card) 3× (suspension)	Palau Blaugrana, Barcelona; Attendance: 5,278; Referees: Gjeding, Hansen (DEN)

Barça Lassa won 61–51 on aggregate.

27 April 2019; 18:00	PGE Vive Kielce (Poland)	34–24	(France) Paris Saint-Germain	Hala Legionów, Kielce; Attendance: 4,200; Referees: Zotin, Volodkov (RUS)
27 April 2019; 18:00	Karalek, Kulesh 6	(16–11)	Gensheimer 11	Hala Legionów, Kielce; Attendance: 4,200; Referees: Zotin, Volodkov (RUS)
27 April 2019; 18:00	3× (yellow card) 4× (suspension)	Report	3× (yellow card) 2× (suspension)	Hala Legionów, Kielce; Attendance: 4,200; Referees: Zotin, Volodkov (RUS)

5 May 2019; 17:00	Paris Saint-Germain (France)	35–26	(Poland) PGE Vive Kielce	Stade Pierre de Coubertin, Paris; Attendance: 3,500; Referees: Nikolić, Stojković (SRB)
5 May 2019; 17:00	Remili 13	(18–11)	Cindrić 6	Stade Pierre de Coubertin, Paris; Attendance: 3,500; Referees: Nikolić, Stojković (SRB)
5 May 2019; 17:00	3× (yellow card) 8× (suspension) 1× (red card)	Report	3× (yellow card) 8× (suspension)	Stade Pierre de Coubertin, Paris; Attendance: 3,500; Referees: Nikolić, Stojković (SRB)

PGE Vive Kielce won 60–59 on aggregate.

24 April 2019; 19:00	Flensburg-Handewitt (Germany)	22–28	(Hungary) Telekom Veszprém	Flens-Arena, Flensburg; Attendance: 5,118; Referees: Horáček, Novotný (CZE)
24 April 2019; 19:00	Glandorf, Jøndal 5	(15–15)	Nilsson 6	Flens-Arena, Flensburg; Attendance: 5,118; Referees: Horáček, Novotný (CZE)
24 April 2019; 19:00	1× (yellow card) 3× (suspension)	Report	3× (yellow card) 4× (suspension)	Flens-Arena, Flensburg; Attendance: 5,118; Referees: Horáček, Novotný (CZE)

4 May 2019; 17:30	Telekom Veszprém (Hungary)	29–25	(Germany) Flensburg-Handewitt	Veszprém Aréna, Veszprém; Attendance: 5,321; Referees: Pichon, Reveret (FRA)
4 May 2019; 17:30	Gajić 6	(17–13)	Wanne 7	Veszprém Aréna, Veszprém; Attendance: 5,321; Referees: Pichon, Reveret (FRA)
4 May 2019; 17:30	1× (yellow card) 3× (suspension)	Report	2× (yellow card) 1× (suspension)	Veszprém Aréna, Veszprém; Attendance: 5,321; Referees: Pichon, Reveret (FRA)

Telekom Veszprém won 57–47 on aggregate.

25 April 2019; 20:00	RK Vardar (North Macedonia)	31–23	(Hungary) MOL-Pick Szeged	Jane Sandanski Arena, Skopje; Attendance: 5,500; Referees: Baďura, Ondogrecula (SVK)
25 April 2019; 20:00	Karačić, Krištopāns 8	(14–12)	Bánhidi 5	Jane Sandanski Arena, Skopje; Attendance: 5,500; Referees: Baďura, Ondogrecula (SVK)
25 April 2019; 20:00	3× (yellow card) 3× (suspension)	Report	2× (yellow card) 5× (suspension)	Jane Sandanski Arena, Skopje; Attendance: 5,500; Referees: Baďura, Ondogrecula (SVK)

5 May 2019; 19:00	MOL-Pick Szeged (Hungary)	29–25	(North Macedonia) RK Vardar	Városi Sportcsarnok, Szeged; Attendance: 3,200; Referees: López, Ramírez (ESP)
5 May 2019; 19:00	Bánhidi 7	(17–9)	Karačić 8	Városi Sportcsarnok, Szeged; Attendance: 3,200; Referees: López, Ramírez (ESP)
5 May 2019; 19:00	4× (yellow card) 8× (suspension) 2× (red card)	Report	2× (yellow card) 5× (suspension) 1× (red card)	Városi Sportcsarnok, Szeged; Attendance: 3,200; Referees: López, Ramírez (ESP)

RK Vardar won 56–52 on aggregate.

== Final four ==
The final four was held at the Lanxess Arena in Cologne, Germany on 1 and 2 June 2019. The draw took place on 7 May 2019.

=== Bracket ===
Semifinals
1 June
(Hungary) Telekom Veszprém	33
(Poland) PGE Vive Kielce	30
1 June
(Spain) Barça Lassa	27
(North Macedonia) RK Vardar	29

Final
2 June
(Hungary) Telekom Veszprém	24
(North Macedonia) RK Vardar	27
Third place
2 June
(Poland) PGE Vive Kielce	35
(Spain) Barça Lassa	40

=== Semifinals ===
1 June 2019; 15:15	Telekom Veszprém (Hungary)	33–30	(Poland) PGE Vive Kielce	Lanxess Arena, Cologne; Attendance: 19,250; Referees: Nikolov, Nachevski (MKD)
1 June 2019; 15:15	Nenadić 12	(13–13)	A. Dujshebaev 6	Lanxess Arena, Cologne; Attendance: 19,250; Referees: Nikolov, Nachevski (MKD)
1 June 2019; 15:15	2× (yellow card) 3× (suspension) 1× (red card)	Report	2× (yellow card) 2× (suspension)	Lanxess Arena, Cologne; Attendance: 19,250; Referees: Nikolov, Nachevski (MKD)

1 June 2019; 18:00	Barça Lassa (Spain)	27–29	(North Macedonia) RK Vardar	Lanxess Arena, Cologne; Attendance: 19,250; Referees: Sondors, Līcis (LAT)
1 June 2019; 18:00	Gómez 9	(16–9)	Krištopāns 10	Lanxess Arena, Cologne; Attendance: 19,250; Referees: Sondors, Līcis (LAT)
1 June 2019; 18:00	4× (yellow card) 5× (suspension) 1× (red card)	Report	2× (yellow card) 3× (suspension)	Lanxess Arena, Cologne; Attendance: 19,250; Referees: Sondors, Līcis (LAT)

=== Third place game ===
2 June 2019; 15:15	Barça Lassa (Spain)	40–35	(Poland) PGE Vive Kielce	Lanxess Arena, Cologne; Attendance: 19,250; Referees: Santos, Fonseca (POR)
2 June 2019; 15:15	Mem 8	(20–16)	Moryto 10	Lanxess Arena, Cologne; Attendance: 19,250; Referees: Santos, Fonseca (POR)
2 June 2019; 15:15	9× (suspension) 1× (red card)	Report	4× (yellow card) 8× (suspension)	Lanxess Arena, Cologne; Attendance: 19,250; Referees: Santos, Fonseca (POR)

=== Final ===
2 June 2019; 18:00	RK Vardar (North Macedonia)	27–24	(Hungary) Telekom Veszprém	Lanxess Arena, Cologne; Attendance: 19,250; Referees: Geipel, Helbig (GER)
2 June 2019; 18:00	Ferreira 6	(16–11)	Mahé 6	Lanxess Arena, Cologne; Attendance: 19,250; Referees: Geipel, Helbig (GER)
2 June 2019; 18:00	4× (yellow card) 2× (suspension)	Report	1× (yellow card) 5× (suspension)	Lanxess Arena, Cologne; Attendance: 19,250; Referees: Geipel, Helbig (GER)
