= Delhees =

Delhees is a surname. Notable people with the surname include:

- Max Delhees (born 1960), Swiss handball player
- Petra Jauch-Delhees (born 1959), born Petra Delhees, Swiss tennis player
- Ron Delhees (born 1995), Swiss handball player
