= Max Delhees =

Swiss handball player

Personal information
- Nationality: Swiss
- Born: 2 July 1960 (age 64)

Sport
- Sport: Handball

Max Delhees (born 2 July 1960) is a Swiss handball player. He competed in the men's tournament at the 1984 Summer Olympics.
