= Stig-Tore Moen Nilsen =

Norwegian handball player (born 1994)

Personal information
- Nationality: Norwegian
- Born: 9 August 1994 (age 32) Alta, Norway
- Height: 1.92 m (6 ft 4 in)

Sport
- Sport: Handball
- Position: Right back
- Current club: GOG Håndbold
- Number: 9

Senior clubs
- Years: Team
- -2016: Bodø HK
- 2016-2019: IFK Kristianstad
- 2019-2021: GOG Håndbold
- 2021-: Elverum Håndball
National team
| Years | Team | Apps | (Gls) |
| 2015–2018 | Norway | 6 | (4) |

Stig-Tore Moen Nilsen (born 9 August 1994) is a Norwegian handball player for GOG Håndbold and the Norwegian national team.
