= Ron Delhees =

Swiss handball player

Personal information
- Full name: Ron Delhees
- Nationality: Swiss
- Born: 28 August 1995 (age 31) Zug, Switzerland
- Height: 1.97 m (6 ft 6 in)

Sport
- Sport: Handball
- Position: Right Back
- Current club: Wacker Thun
- Number: 26

Senior clubs
- Years: Team
- 2012–2014: HC Kriens
- 2014-2016: GC Amicitia Zürich
- 2016-2018: Kadetten Schaffhausen
- 2018-: Wacker Thun
National team
- Years: Team
- –: Switzerland

Ron Delhees (born 28 August 1995) is a Swiss handballer currently playing for Wacker Thun of the Swiss Handball League. He also plays for the Switzerland national team.
