= Darko Đukić =

Serbian handball player (born 1994)

Darko Ðukić
Personal information
- Nationality: Serbian
- Born: 11 December 1994 (age 31) Niš, Serbia, FR Yugoslavia
- Height: 1.89 m (6 ft 2 in)

Sport
- Sport: Handball
- Position: Right wing
- Current club: Dinamo București
- Number: 45

Senior clubs
- Years: Team
- –2014: RK Železničar 1949
- 2014–2015: RK Metalurg Skopje
- 2015–2016: Beşiktaş
- 2016–2018: PGE Vive Kielce
- 2018–2020: HC Meshkov Brest
- 2020–2021: Sporting CP
- 2021–2024: RK Vardar 1961
- 2024–2025: Dinamo București
- 2025–: GRK Ohrid
National team
| Years | Team | Apps | (Gls) |
| 2012– | Serbia | 54 | (134) |
- Updated on 25 August 2024

Darko Ðukić (born 11 December 1994) is a Serbian handball player who plays for Dinamo București and the Serbian national team.

He debuted for the Serbian national team on 22 September 2012 against Germany. He competed at the 2016 European Men's Handball Championship, where Serbia finished 15th.

== Honors ==
- Macedonian Handball Super League

Winner: 2022

- Macedonian Handball Cup

Winner: 2022, 2023
