= Artem Kozakevych =

Ukrainian handball player

Personal information
- Nationality: Ukrainian
- Born: 2 October 1992 (age 34) Novovolynsk, Ukraine
- Height: 1.82 m (6 ft 0 in)

Sport
- Sport: Handball
- Position: Right wing
- Current club: CS Minaur Baia Mare
- Number: 20
National team
Years	Team	Apps	(Gls)
–	Ukraine	40	(94)

Artem Kozakevych (born 2 October 1992) is a Ukrainian handball player for CS Minaur Baia Mare and the Ukrainian national team.

He represented Ukraine at the 2020 European Men's Handball Championship.
