= 2026 European Men's Handball Championship squads =

This article displays the squads for the 2026 European Men's Handball Championship. Each team consisted of up to 20 players, of whom 16 may be fielded for each match.

Age, club, caps and goals as of 15 January 2026.

== Group A ==
=== Austria ===
The squad was announced on 3 January 2026.

Head coach: (Spain) Iker Romero

| No. | Pos. | Name | Date of birth (age) | Height | App. | Goals | Club |
|---|---|---|---|---|---|---|---|
| 6 | LB | Markus Mahr | 3 November 2000 (aged 25) | 1.89 m | 35 | 36 | (Germany) 1. VfL Potsdam |
| 7 | RB | Janko Božović | 14 July 1985 (aged 40) | 2.04 m | 203 | 576 | (Kuwait) Sulaibikhat SC |
| 18 | P | Emanuel Petrusic | 26 June 2001 (aged 24) | 1.93 m | 4 | 0 | (Austria) Handball Tirol |
| 19 | RW | Nils Moser | 2 June 2005 (aged 20) | 1.90 m | 3 | 2 | (Austria) HC Linz AG |
| 20 | LW | Sebastian Frimmel | 18 December 1995 (aged 30) | 1.90 m | 129 | 473 | (Hungary) SC Pick Szeged |
| 23 | LB | Nemanja Beloš | 8 June 1994 (aged 31) | 1.92 m | 27 | 48 | (Austria) HSG Graz |
| 26 | P | Lukas Herburger | 19 December 1994 (aged 31) | 1.97 m | 92 | 90 | (Germany) Füchse Berlin |
| 30 | RB | Boris Zivkovic | 2 May 1992 (aged 33) | 1.95 m | 86 | 167 | (France) C' Chartres Métropole Handball |
| 45 | LW | Eric Damböck | 6 September 1999 (aged 26) | 1.81 m | 53 | 69 | (Germany) TV Emsdetten |
| 51 | GK | Leon Bergmann | 17 April 2004 (aged 21) | 1.96 m | 13 | 1 | (Switzerland) Kadetten Schaffhausen |
| 53 | LB | Mykola Bilyk | 28 November 1996 (aged 29) | 1.98 m | 116 | 523 | (Germany) THW Kiel |
| 55 | P | Tobias Wagner | 26 March 1995 (aged 30) | 1.98 m | 124 | 370 | (France) Limoges Handball |
| 57 | RW | Jakob Nigg | 6 May 2003 (aged 22) | 1.84 m | 36 | 55 | (Germany) TVB Stuttgart |
| 66 | CB | Elias Kofler | 9 August 2000 (aged 25) | 1.87 m | 41 | 24 | (Germany) HSV Hamburg |
| 72 | CB | Lukas Hutecek | 2 July 2000 (aged 25) | 1.89 m | 73 | 254 | (Germany) TBV Lemgo |
| 97 | RB | Michael Miskovez | 29 August 1997 (aged 28) | 1.97 m | 51 | 10 | (Austria) Handball Tirol |
| 98 | GK | Constantin Möstl | 1 April 2000 (aged 25) | 1.86 m | 48 | 0 | (Germany) TBV Lemgo |

=== Germany ===
The squad was announced on 17 December 2025.

Head coach: (Iceland) Alfreð Gíslason

| No. | Pos. | Name | Date of birth (age) | Height | App. | Goals | Club |
|---|---|---|---|---|---|---|---|
| 1 | GK | David Späth | 29 April 2002 (aged 23) | 2.00 m | 46 | 3 | (Germany) Rhein-Neckar Löwen |
| 3 | CB | Nils Lichtlein | 31 July 2002 (aged 23) | 1.83 m | 31 | 35 | (Germany) Füchse Berlin |
| 4 | P | Johannes Golla (c) | 5 November 1997 (aged 28) | 1.95 m | 108 | 377 | (Germany) SG Flensburg-Handewitt |
| 5 | LB | Miro Schluroff | 25 April 2000 (aged 25) | 1.98 m | 8 | 20 | (Germany) VfL Gummersbach |
| 13 | LB | Matthes Langhoff | 30 March 2002 (aged 23) | 1.93 m | 3 | 2 | (Germany) Füchse Berlin |
| 14 | RW | Mathis Häseler | 25 June 2002 (aged 23) | 1.90 m | 6 | 12 | (Germany) VfL Gummersbach |
| 15 | CB | Juri Knorr | 9 May 2000 (aged 25) | 1.94 m | 83 | 319 | (Denmark) Aalborg Håndbold |
| 17 | RW | Lukas Zerbe | 17 January 1996 (aged 29) | 1.84 m | 47 | 105 | (Germany) THW Kiel |
| 18 | LB | Julian Köster | 16 March 2000 (aged 25) | 2.03 m | 75 | 198 | (Germany) VfL Gummersbach |
| 23 | RB | Renārs Uščins | 29 April 2002 (aged 23) | 1.89 m | 45 | 182 | (Germany) TSV Hannover-Burgdorf |
| 30 | CB | Tom Kiesler | 24 April 2001 (aged 24) | 1.93 m | 4 | 0 | (Germany) VfL Gummersbach |
| 32 | RB | Franz Semper | 5 July 1997 (aged 28) | 1.91 m | 30 | 61 | (Germany) SC DHfK Leipzig |
| 33 | GK | Andreas Wolff | 3 March 1991 (aged 34) | 1.98 m | 187 | 16 | (Germany) THW Kiel |
| 34 | LW | Rune Dahmke | 10 April 1993 (aged 32) | 1.89 m | 96 | 137 | (Germany) THW Kiel |
| 36 | LW | Lukas Mertens | 22 March 1996 (aged 29) | 1.82 m | 70 | 158 | (Germany) SC Magdeburg |
| 54 | P | Justus Fischer | 6 February 2003 (aged 22) | 1.93 m | 34 | 42 | (Germany) TSV Hannover-Burgdorf |
| 71 | LB | Marko Grgic | 11 September 2003 (aged 22) | 1.98 m | 31 | 91 | (Germany) SG Flensburg-Handewitt |
| 80 | P | Jannik Kohlbacher | 19 July 1995 (aged 30) | 1.90 m | 127 | 239 | (Germany) Rhein-Neckar Löwen |

=== Serbia ===
A 21-player list was announced on 16 December 2025. The final roster was revealed on 15 January 2026.

Head coach: (Spain) Raúl González

| No. | Pos. | Name | Date of birth (age) | Height | App. | Goals | Club |
|---|---|---|---|---|---|---|---|
| 1 | GK | Vladimir Cupara | 19 February 1994 (aged 31) | 1.99 m | 79 | 5 | (Romania) Dinamo București |
| 3 | RW | Vukašin Vorkapić | 1 October 1997 (aged 28) | 1.87 m | 34 | 69 | (Serbia) RK Vojvodina |
| 4 | P | Marko Jevtić | 17 October 2001 (aged 24) | 1.86 m | 5 | 21 | (Spain) CD Bidasoa |
| 13 | LB | Uroš Borzaš | 28 July 1999 (aged 26) | 1.88 m | 38 | 66 | (North Macedonia) RK Alkaloid |
| 15 | RW | Uroš Kojadinović | 26 September 2000 (aged 25) | 1.86 m | 23 | 67 | (France) Fenix Toulouse Handball |
| 16 | GK | Andrej Trnavac | 13 December 1998 (aged 27) | 1.87 m | 8 | 0 | (Serbia) RK Partizan |
| 19 | LW | Nemanja Ilić | 11 May 1990 (aged 35) | 1.76 m | 140 | 397 | (France) Fenix Toulouse Handball |
| 21 | LW | Vanja Ilić | 25 February 1993 (aged 32) | 1.85 m | 97 | 245 | (France) C' Chartres Métropole Handball |
| 22 | P | Ivan Mićić | 22 September 2000 (aged 25) | 1.90 m | 5 | 13 | (Serbia) RK Partizan |
| 23 | CB | Aljoša Damjanović | 29 May 2005 (aged 20) | 1.87 m | 0 | 0 | (Serbia) RK Metaloplastika |
| 24 | CB | Lazar Kukić | 12 December 1995 (aged 30) | 1.88 m | 61 | 147 | (Hungary) SC Pick Szeged |
| 28 | RB | Uroš Mitrović | 13 September 2004 (aged 21) | 1.98 m | 2 | 5 | (North Macedonia) RK Vardar |
| 29 | LB | Marko Tasić | 2 February 2003 (aged 22) | 1.99 m | 2 | 1 | (Serbia) Dinamo Pančevo |
| 35 | CB | Veljko Popović | 18 February 2000 (aged 25) | 1.90 m | 2 | 6 | (Serbia) RK Partizan |
| 40 | CB | Stefan Dodić | 13 March 2003 (aged 22) | 1.94 m | 10 | 17 | (Serbia) RK Vojvodina |
| 45 | RW | Darko Đukić | 11 December 1994 (aged 31) | 1.91 m | 58 | 157 | (North Macedonia) GRK Ohrid |
| 46 | P | Dragan Pechmalbec | 5 January 1996 (aged 30) | 1.94 m | 35 | 92 | (Hungary) Veszprém KC |
| 93 | P | Mijajlo Marsenić | 9 March 1993 (aged 32) | 2.02 m | 130 | 298 | (Germany) Füchse Berlin |
| 96 | GK | Dejan Milosavljev | 16 March 1996 (aged 29) | 1.96 m | 74 | 3 | (Germany) Füchse Berlin |

=== Spain ===
The squad was announced on 18 December 2025.

Head coach: Jordi Ribera

| No. | Pos. | Name | Date of birth (age) | Height | App. | Goals | Club |
|---|---|---|---|---|---|---|---|
| 5 | LB | Antonio Serradilla | 10 January 1999 (aged 27) | 1.98 m | 16 | 9 | (Germany) TVB Stuttgart |
| 7 | LB | Jan Gurri Aregay | 10 June 2002 (aged 23) | 1.90 m | 22 | 31 | (Portugal) Sporting CP |
| 8 | LB | Agustín Casado | 21 May 1996 (aged 29) | 1.93 m | 74 | 185 | (France) Montpellier Handball |
| 9 | CB | Ian Tarrafeta | 4 January 1999 (aged 27) | 1.88 m | 73 | 176 | (France) HBC Nantes |
| 10 | RB | Alex Dujshebaev | 17 December 1992 (aged 33) | 1.88 m | 174 | 504 | (Poland) KS Iskra Kielce |
| 11 | RW | Kauldi Odriozola | 7 January 1997 (aged 29) | 1.83 m | 81 | 205 | (France) HBC Nantes |
| 18 | RB | Imanol Garciandia | 30 April 1995 (aged 30) | 2.03 m | 78 | 204 | (Hungary) SC Pick Szeged |
| 20 | P | Abel Serdio | 16 April 1994 (aged 31) | 1.95 m | 66 | 129 | (Poland) Wisła Płock |
| 22 | RB | Marcos Fis Ballester | 1 April 2007 (aged 18) | 1.88 m | 3 | 10 | (Spain) BM Granollers |
| 24 | LB | Daniel Dujshebaev | 4 July 1997 (aged 28) | 1.96 m | 111 | 244 | (Poland) KS Iskra Kielce |
| 25 | GK | Sergey Hernández | 17 June 1995 (aged 30) | 1.98 m | 69 | 12 | (Germany) SC Magdeburg |
| 28 | RW | Aleix Gómez | 7 May 1997 (aged 28) | 1.83 m | 100 | 407 | (Spain) FC Barcelona |
| 33 | LB | Natan Suárez | 20 January 1998 (aged 27) | 1.85 m | 2 | 3 | (Portugal) Sporting CP |
| 37 | P | Víctor Romero Holguín | 9 March 2004 (aged 21) | 1.92 m | 12 | 29 | (Portugal) Sporting CP |
| 53 | GK | Ignacio Biosca | 17 July 1995 (aged 30) | 2.00 m | 11 | 1 | (France) HBC Nantes |
| 70 | LW | Daniel Fernández Jiménez | 28 March 2001 (aged 24) | 1.80 m | 63 | 210 | (Spain) FC Barcelona |
| 80 | LW | Ian Barrufet | 19 May 2004 (aged 21) | 1.98 m | 15 | 27 | (Spain) FC Barcelona |
| 99 | P | Javier Rodríguez Moreno | 22 July 2002 (aged 23) | 1.98 m | 30 | 47 | (Portugal) Benfica |

== Group B ==
=== Denmark ===
The squad was announced on 17 December 2025. Thomas Arnoldsen was called up during the main round to replace Lukas Jørgensen.

Head coach: Nikolaj Jacobsen

| No. | Pos. | Name | Date of birth (age) | Height | App. | Goals | Club |
|---|---|---|---|---|---|---|---|
| 3 | RB | Niclas Kirkeløkke | 26 March 1994 (aged 31) | 1.95 m | 100 | 204 | (Germany) SG Flensburg-Handewitt |
| 4 | LW | Magnus Landin | 20 August 1995 (aged 30) | 2.00 m | 163 | 300 | (Germany) THW Kiel |
| 7 | LW | Emil Jakobsen | 24 January 1998 (aged 27) | 1.90 m | 102 | 366 | (Germany) SG Flensburg-Handewitt |
| 11 | CB | Rasmus Lauge | 20 June 1991 (aged 34) | 1.95 m | 186 | 467 | (Denmark) Bjerringbro-Silkeborg Håndbold |
| 12 | GK | Emil Nielsen | 10 March 1997 (aged 28) | 1.95 m | 70 | 6 | (Spain) FC Barcelona |
| 15 | P | Magnus Saugstrup (c) | 12 July 1996 (aged 29) | 1.95 m | 107 | 206 | (Germany) SC Magdeburg |
| 19 | RB | Mathias Gidsel | 8 February 1999 (aged 26) | 1.90 m | 97 | 592 | (Germany) Füchse Berlin |
| 20 | GK | Kevin Møller | 20 June 1989 (aged 36) | 2.00 m | 96 | 8 | (Germany) SG Flensburg-Handewitt |
| 22 | CB | Mads Mensah Larsen | 12 August 1991 (aged 34) | 1.88 m | 218 | 339 | (Denmark) Skjern Håndbold |
| 25 | P | Lukas Jørgensen | 31 March 1999 (aged 26) | 1.94 m | 63 | 178 | (Germany) SG Flensburg-Handewitt |
| 26 | RW | Jóhan á Plógv Hansen | 1 May 1994 (aged 31) | 1.90 m | 111 | 202 | (Denmark) Skanderborg AGF Håndbold |
| 28 | LB | Lasse Andersson | 11 March 1994 (aged 31) | 1.96 m | 88 | 122 | (Germany) Füchse Berlin |
| 33 | P | Emil Bergholt | 25 August 1997 (aged 28) | 1.90 m | 25 | 13 | (Denmark) Skjern Håndbold |
| 34 | P | Simon Hald | 28 September 1994 (aged 31) | 2.03 m | 114 | 118 | (Denmark) Aalborg Håndbold |
| 38 | RB | Mads Hoxer | 6 December 2000 (aged 25) | 1.95 m | 12 | 26 | (Denmark) Aalborg Håndbold |
| 42 | CB | Thomas Arnoldsen | 11 January 2002 (aged 24) | 1.94 m | 30 | 73 | (Denmark) Aalborg Håndbold |
| 43 | LB | Simon Pytlick | 11 December 2000 (aged 25) | 1.93 m | 62 | 287 | (Germany) SG Flensburg-Handewitt |
| 49 | RW | Frederik Bo Andersen | 9 December 1998 (aged 27) | 1.86 m | 5 | 10 | (Germany) HSV Hamburg |
| 59 | CB | Mads Svane Knudsen | 25 March 2002 (aged 23) | 1.85 m | 2 | 6 | (Denmark) Bjerringbro-Silkeborg Håndbold |
| 63 | P | Andreas Magaard | 2 August 1998 (aged 27) | 1.94 m | 0 | 0 | (Germany) HSV Hamburg |
| 64 | LB | Lasse Kjær Møller | 11 June 1996 (aged 29) | 1.99 m | 21 | 27 | (Germany) SG Flensburg-Handewitt |

=== North Macedonia ===
The squad was announced on 18 December 2025.

Head coach: Kiril Lazarov

| No. | Pos. | Name | Date of birth (age) | Height | App. | Goals | Club |
|---|---|---|---|---|---|---|---|
| 1 | GK | Nikola Mitrevski | 3 October 1985 (aged 40) | 1.84 m | 134 | 6 | (North Macedonia) RK Eurofarm Pelister |
| 4 | RB | Martin Velkovski | 10 March 1997 (aged 28) | 1.88 m | 37 | 15 | (North Macedonia) RK Alkaloid |
| 9 | CB | Igor Gjorgiev | 2 June 2000 (aged 25) | 1.87 m | 19 | 32 | (North Macedonia) RK Alkaloid |
| 10 | CB | Marko Mitev | 23 February 2003 (aged 22) | 1.83 m | 15 | 33 | (North Macedonia) RK Alkaloid |
| 12 | GK | Martin Tomovski | 10 July 1997 (aged 28) | 1.94 m | 41 | 5 | (Germany) HB Ludwigsburg |
| 16 | GK | Ivan Galevski | 5 July 2004 (aged 21) | 1.95 m | 13 | 0 | (North Macedonia) RK Alkaloid |
| 17 | P | Nikola Markoski | 22 May 1990 (aged 35) | 1.97 m | 73 | 26 | (North Macedonia) RK Alkaloid |
| 18 | CB | Filip Kuzmanovski | 7 July 1996 (aged 29) | 1.98 m | 82 | 280 | (North Macedonia) RK Eurofarm Pelister |
| 19 | RW | Nenad Kosteski | 4 March 2001 (aged 24) | 1.88 m | 46 | 97 | (North Macedonia) RK Alkaloid |
| 22 | CB | Damjan Mitev | 8 November 2006 (aged 19) | 1.92 m | 8 | 7 | (North Macedonia) RK Alkaloid |
| 26 | RW | Nikola Kosteski | 22 August 1992 (aged 33) | 1.87 m | 13 | 12 | (North Macedonia) RK Alkaloid |
| 31 | P | Samoil Ristevski | 22 May 2006 (aged 19) | 1.99 m | 8 | 5 | (North Macedonia) RK Eurofarm Pelister |
| 32 | LW | Goce Ojleski | 10 October 1989 (aged 36) | 1.82 m | 45 | 127 | (North Macedonia) GRK Ohrid |
| 33 | P | Žarko Peševski | 11 April 1991 (aged 34) | 1.95 m | 63 | 90 | (North Macedonia) RK Eurofarm Pelister |
| 38 | LB | Ivan Djonov | 15 July 1997 (aged 28) | 1.91 m | 13 | 17 | (North Macedonia) RK Alkaloid |
| 42 | P | Marko Stojkovikj | 27 June 2003 (aged 22) | 1.99 m | 13 | 10 | (North Macedonia) RK Alkaloid |
| 44 | P | Mihail Alarov | 21 November 1997 (aged 28) | 1.95 m | 10 | 5 | (North Macedonia) RK Alkaloid |
| 55 | LW | Petar Atanasijevikj | 9 July 2003 (aged 22) | 1.92 m | 8 | 6 | (North Macedonia) RK Eurofarm Pelister |
| 77 | RB | Martin Serafimov | 3 March 2000 (aged 25) | 1.85 m | 39 | 77 | (North Macedonia) RK Alkaloid |
| 88 | CB | Pavle Atanasijevikj | 9 July 2003 (aged 22) | 1.95 m | 3 | 10 | (North Macedonia) RK Eurofarm Pelister |

=== Portugal ===
The squad was announced on 13 January 2026.

Head coach: Paulo Pereira

| No. | Pos. | Name | Date of birth (age) | Height | App. | Goals | Club |
|---|---|---|---|---|---|---|---|
| 8 | P | Victor Iturriza | 22 May 1990 (aged 35) | 1.93 m | 62 | 214 | Kuwait SC |
| 9 | CB | Filipe Graça Monteiro | 26 April 2004 (aged 21) | 1.81 m | 5 | 5 | (Portugal) Sporting CP |
| 13 | LB | Salvador Salvador | 29 July 2001 (aged 24) | 1.98 m | 45 | 102 | (Portugal) Sporting CP |
| 14 | CB | Rui Silva | 28 April 1993 (aged 32) | 1.86 m | 153 | 276 | (Portugal) FC Porto |
| 20 | LB | Miguel José Soares Neves | 31 October 2000 (aged 25) | 2.03 m | 7 | 16 | (France) Saint-Raphaël Var Handball |
| 21 | LW | Leonel Fernandes | 12 March 1998 (aged 27) | 1.91 m | 68 | 121 | (Portugal) FC Porto |
| 23 | LW | Diogo Branquinho | 25 July 1994 (aged 31) | 1.85 m | 112 | 233 | (Portugal) Sporting CP |
| 25 | RW | Antonio Areia | 21 June 1990 (aged 35) | 1.90 m | 115 | 344 | (France) Tremblay Handball |
| 26 | RB | Francisco Costa | 16 February 2005 (aged 20) | 1.90 m | 44 | 157 | (Portugal) Sporting CP |
| 29 | RW | José Luís Correia Ferreira | 24 June 2005 (aged 20) | 1.83 m | 5 | 5 | (Portugal) FC Porto |
| 41 | GK | Gustavo Capdeville | 31 August 1997 (aged 28) | 1.90 m | 74 | 0 | (Portugal) Benfica |
| 66 | RB | João Gomes | 6 September 2002 (aged 23) | 1.78 m | 20 | 48 | (Germany) VfL Gummersbach |
| 79 | CB | Martim Costa | 27 September 2002 (aged 23) | 1.88 m | 42 | 177 | (Portugal) Sporting CP |
| 82 | P | Luís Frade | 11 September 1998 (aged 27) | 1.94 m | 90 | 204 | (Spain) FC Barcelona |
| 86 | P | Ricardo Brandão | 28 April 2004 (aged 21) | 1.95 m | 25 | 29 | (Portugal) FC Porto |
| 95 | CB | Gabriel Cavalcanti | 30 April 2004 (aged 21) | 1.97 m | 9 | 16 | (Portugal) Benfica |
| 96 | GK | Pedro Tonicher | 16 January 2003 (aged 22) | 1.90 m | 2 | 0 | (Spain) BM Ciudad Encantada |
| 99 | GK | Diogo Valério | 10 February 1999 (aged 26) | 1.94 m | 14 | 0 | (Greece) Olympiacos |

=== Romania ===
A 19-player squad was announced on 9 December 2025. The final squad was announced on 13 January 2026.

Head coach: George Buricea

| No. | Pos. | Name | Date of birth (age) | Height | App. | Goals | Club |
|---|---|---|---|---|---|---|---|
| 1 | GK | Ionuț Iancu | 18 February 1994 (aged 31) | 1.92 m | 90 | 7 | (Romania) Dinamo București |
| 2 | LW | Denis Vereș | 19 November 2003 (aged 22) | 1.77 m | 13 | 6 | (Romania) AHC Potaissa Turda |
| 5 | RW | Ionuț Nistor Ioniță | 24 May 1994 (aged 31) | 1.87 m | 51 | 82 | (Romania) Dinamo București |
| 6 | LB | Tudor Botea | 7 July 1997 (aged 28) | 1.94 m | 41 | 63 | (Romania) CS Minaur Baia Mare |
| 7 | LW | Alexandru Andrei | 17 July 1998 (aged 27) | 1.80 m | 21 | 15 | (Romania) SCM Politehnica Timișoara |
| 8 | LB | Robert Militaru | 4 January 1994 (aged 32) | 1.96 m | 95 | 17 | (Romania) Dinamo București |
| 9 | RW | Sorin Grigore | 2 February 2004 (aged 21) | 1.93 m | 13 | 7 | (Romania) CSU Suceava |
| 10 | CB | Gabriel Cumpănici | 12 October 1998 (aged 27) | 1.98 m | 31 | 29 | (Romania) CS Minaur Baia Mare |
| 11 | P | Robert Nagy | 6 July 1997 (aged 28) | 1.92 m | 28 | 25 | (Romania) CS Minaur Baia Mare |
| 13 | RB | Radu Ghiță | 22 November 1990 (aged 35) | 1.89 m | 75 | 96 | (Romania) AHC Potaissa Turda |
| 16 | GK | Mihai Cătălin Popescu | 15 March 1985 (aged 40) | 1.95 m | 249 | 8 | (Romania) AHC Potaissa Turda |
| 17 | LB | Dan-Emil Racoțea | 21 July 1995 (aged 30) | 2.03 m | 90 | 77 | (Poland) KS Azoty-Puławy |
| 20 | P | András Szász | 24 January 1994 (aged 31) | 1.98 m | 35 | 24 | (Romania) SCM Politehnica Timișoara |
| 23 | P | Călin Dedu | 21 October 2002 (aged 23) | 2.07 m | 48 | 51 | (Romania) Dinamo București |
| 25 | RB | Ionuț Adrian Stănescu | 31 March 2003 (aged 22) | 1.92 m | 15 | 12 | (Poland) Wybrzeże Gdańsk |
| 41 | LB | Răzvan Trif | 29 December 1999 (aged 26) | 1.92 m | 10 | 1 | (Romania) SCM Politehnica Timișoara |
| 44 | CB | Daniel Stanciuc | 7 March 2004 (aged 21) | 1.89 m | 26 | 83 | (Romania) Dinamo București |
| 47 | LB | Andrei Buzle | 3 May 1999 (aged 26) | 1.98 m | 64 | 112 | (Romania) Dinamo București |

== Group C ==
=== Czech Republic ===
The final squad was announced on 12 January 2026.

Head coach: Ondřej Mika

| No. | Pos. | Name | Date of birth (age) | Height | App. | Goals | Club |
|---|---|---|---|---|---|---|---|
| 1 | GK | Tomáš Mrkva | 20 January 1989 (aged 36) | 2.01 m | 140 | 12 | (Germany) SC DHfK Leipzig |
| 3 | LW | Petr Široký | 8 December 2002 (aged 23) | 1.86 m | 3 | 8 | (Czech Republic) HCB Karviná |
| 6 | RB | Dominik Skopár | 4 May 2006 (aged 19) | 1.80 m | 16 | 48 | (Czech Republic) Talent Plzeň |
| 7 | RB | Tomáš Piroch | 12 May 2000 (aged 25) | 1.87 m | 50 | 125 | (Germany) SC DHfK Leipzig |
| 8 | LW | Pavel Chotěborský | 29 July 2003 (aged 22) | 1.85 m | 6 | 4 | (Czech Republic) HK Lovosice |
| 14 | RW | Jakub Štěrba | 11 July 1996 (aged 29) | 1.84 m | 34 | 67 | (Germany) GWD Minden |
| 23 | LB | Jonáš Josef | 29 July 2004 (aged 21) | 1.90 m | 13 | 26 | (Czech Republic) Dukla Prague |
| 28 | CB | Matěj Havran | 22 January 2002 (aged 23) | 1.90 m | 29 | 17 | (Hungary) Tatabánya KC |
| 33 | P | Matěj Nantl | 15 July 1998 (aged 27) | 1.95 m | 16 | 13 | (Czech Republic) HCB Karviná |
| 34 | LB | Dominik Solák | 17 August 1997 (aged 28) | 1.99 m | 54 | 89 | (Czech Republic) HCB Karviná |
| 37 | P | Jan Užek | 11 October 1993 (aged 32) | 1.94 m | 39 | 40 | (Czech Republic) HCB Karviná |
| 39 | CB | Lukáš Mořkovský | 4 January 2002 (aged 24) | 1.89 m | 23 | 47 | (Czech Republic) HC Zubří |
| 43 | CB | Jakub Douda | 7 March 1994 (aged 31) | 1.89 m | 10 | 12 | (Czech Republic) Talent Plzeň |
| 49 | LB | Daniel Bláha | 27 December 2005 (aged 20) | 2.12 m | 17 | 26 | (Czech Republic) Talent Plzeň |
| 53 | LB | Martin Brězina | 22 August 2001 (aged 24) | 1.90 m | 14 | 2 | (Czech Republic) Dukla Prague |
| 77 | P | Daniel Režnický | 26 March 1998 (aged 27) | 1.90 m | 31 | 25 | (Switzerland) Kadetten Schaffhausen |
| 87 | RB | Filip Tůma | 9 November 2005 (aged 20) | 1.87 m | 2 | 4 | (Czech Republic) TJ Sokol Nové Veselí |
| 96 | GK | Jan Hrdlička | 10 November 1996 (aged 29) | 1.89 m | 28 | 0 | (Germany) HB Ludwigsburg |

=== France ===
The squad was announced on 12 January 2026. On 13 January 2026, Nedim Remili withdrew due to an injury and was replaced by Aymeric Zaepfel.

Head coach: Guillaume Gille

| No. | Pos. | Name | Date of birth (age) | Height | App. | Goals | Club |
|---|---|---|---|---|---|---|---|
| 2 | RW | Yanis Lenne | 29 June 1996 (aged 29) | 1.87 m | 66 | 131 | (Hungary) Veszprém KC |
| 4 | CB | Aymeric Minne | 20 April 1997 (aged 28) | 1.86 m | 49 | 159 | (France) HBC Nantes |
| 6 | RB | Julien Bos | 18 August 1998 (aged 27) | 1.88 m | 23 | 35 | (France) HBC Nantes |
| 8 | LB | Elohim Prandi | 24 August 1998 (aged 27) | 1.93 m | 64 | 176 | (France) Paris Saint-Germain |
| 9 | RB | Melvyn Richardson | 31 January 1997 (aged 28) | 1.90 m | 115 | 296 | (Poland) Wisła Płock |
| 10 | RB | Dika Mem | 31 August 1997 (aged 28) | 1.94 m | 141 | 528 | (Spain) FC Barcelona |
| 11 | P | Nicolas Tournat | 5 April 1994 (aged 31) | 2.00 m | 120 | 281 | (France) HBC Nantes |
| 12 | GK | Valentin Kieffer | 2 July 1999 (aged 26) | 1.90 m | 2 | 0 | (France) Dunkerque HB |
| 16 | GK | Charles Bolzinger | 14 December 2000 (aged 25) | 1.98 m | 28 | 1 | (France) Montpellier Handball |
| 23 | P | Ludovic Fabregas | 1 July 1996 (aged 29) | 1.98 m | 166 | 416 | (Spain) FC Barcelona |
| 25 | LW | Hugo Descat | 16 August 1992 (aged 33) | 1.83 m | 73 | 320 | (Hungary) Veszprém KC |
| 29 | RW | Benoît Kounkoud | 19 February 1997 (aged 28) | 1.90 m | 67 | 98 | (Poland) KS Kielce |
| 30 | LW | Wallem Peleka | 18 January 2002 (aged 23) | 1.96 m | 4 | 0 | (France) Paris Saint-Germain |
| 31 | LW | Dylan Nahi | 30 November 1999 (aged 26) | 1.98 m | 81 | 218 | (Poland) KS Kielce |
| 34 | P | Karl Konan | 3 June 1995 (aged 30) | 2.00 m | 59 | 8 | (France) Paris Saint-Germain |
| 37 | LB | Aymeric Zaepfel | 3 October 2001 (aged 24) | 1.89 m | 3 | 2 | (France) Pays d'Aix Université Club |
| 39 | LB | Thibaud Briet | 14 December 1999 (aged 26) | 2.05 m | 46 | 100 | (France) HBC Nantes |
| 92 | GK | Rémi Desbonnet | 28 February 1992 (aged 33) | 1.82 m | 68 | 6 | (France) Montpellier Handball |

=== Norway ===
The squad was announced on 17 December 2025. On 5 January 2026, Simen Schønningsen replaced Harald Reinkind in the squad due to an injury. Later, Gabriel Setterblom was added, and Henrik Jakobsen had to withdraw from the squad due to an injury.

Head coach: Jonas Wille

| No. | Pos. | Name | Date of birth (age) | Height | App. | Goals | Club |
|---|---|---|---|---|---|---|---|
| 1 | GK | Robin Paulsen Haug | 1 September 1998 (aged 27) | 1.94 m | 7 | 0 | (Germany) HSV Hamburg |
| 3 | P | Vetle Eck Aga (c) | 4 October 1993 (aged 32) | 1.90 m | 74 | 4 | (Norway) Kolstad Håndball |
| 5 | CB | Sander Sagosen | 14 September 1995 (aged 30) | 1.95 m | 186 | 907 | (Denmark) Aalborg Håndbold |
| 9 | P | Henrik Jakobsen | 16 December 1992 (aged 33) | 1.96 m | 62 | 62 | (Denmark) GOG Håndbold |
| 10 | P | Vetle Rønningen | 13 May 1998 (aged 27) | 2.04 m | 7 | 3 | (Denmark) Aalborg Håndbold |
| 18 | LB | William Aar | 23 October 1997 (aged 28) | 1.99 m | 34 | 47 | (Denmark) TTH Holstebro |
| 22 | CB | Tobias Grøndahl | 22 January 2001 (aged 24) | 1.82 m | 58 | 197 | (Germany) Füchse Berlin |
| 25 | P | Martin Hovde | 17 December 2001 (aged 24) | 2.01 m | 2 | 4 | (Norway) Kolstad Håndball |
| 29 | CB | Magnus Fredriksen | 24 May 1997 (aged 28) | 1.88 m | 28 | 15 | (Denmark) SønderjyskE |
| 30 | GK | Torbjørn Bergerud | 16 July 1994 (aged 31) | 2.00 m | 167 | 0 | (Poland) Wisła Płock |
| 31 | RW | Kasper Lien | 15 April 2001 (aged 24) | 1.94 m | 32 | 52 | (Germany) TVB Stuttgart |
| 32 | P | Thomas Solstad | 26 February 1997 (aged 28) | 1.94 m | 49 | 85 | (Germany) TSV Hannover-Burgdorf |
| 35 | RB | Patrick Helland Anderson | 8 December 2004 (aged 21) | 1.93 m | 9 | 25 | (Denmark) Aalborg Håndbold |
| 40 | LW | August Pedersen | 24 June 1994 (aged 31) | 1.80 m | 19 | 34 | (Germany) TSV Hannover-Burgdorf |
| 42 | RB | Gabriel Setterblom | 22 November 1997 (aged 28) | 1.95 m | 18 | 34 | (Denmark) SønderjyskE |
| 43 | LB | Simen Lyse | 1 February 2000 (aged 25) | 1.95 m | 40 | 124 | (France) Paris Saint-Germain |
| 44 | RW | Kevin Gulliksen | 9 November 1996 (aged 29) | 1.79 m | 108 | 185 | (Norway) Elverum Håndball |
| 45 | RB | Simen Schønningsen | 21 February 1996 (aged 29) | 1.91 m | 7 | 15 | (Denmark) HØJ Elite |
| 71 | LW | Alexander Blonz | 17 April 2000 (aged 25) | 1.89 m | 98 | 264 | (Denmark) Aalborg Håndbold |

=== Ukraine ===
The squad was announced on 31 December 2025.

Head coach: Vadym Brazhnyk

| No. | Pos. | Name | Date of birth (age) | Height | App. | Goals | Club |
|---|---|---|---|---|---|---|---|
| 1 | GK | Anton Terekhov | 28 July 1992 (aged 33) | 1.94 m | 38 | 1 | (Romania) CS Minaur Baia Mare |
| 5 | RW | Andrii Akimenko | 12 June 1994 (aged 31) | 1.90 m | 57 | 194 | (Romania) Dinamo București |
| 7 | RW | Illya Blyznyuk | 19 February 2001 (aged 24) | 1.85 m | 23 | 57 | (Czech Republic) HCB Karviná |
| 9 | CB | Danylo Savchuk | 25 June 2006 (aged 19) | 1.85 m | 12 | 6 | (Ukraine) CSKA Kyiv |
| 10 | P | Dmytro Tiutiunnyk | 7 March 1993 (aged 32) | 1.98 m | 31 | 42 | (Ukraine) HC Motor Zaporizhzhia |
| 11 | LW | Zakhar Denysov | 1 March 1990 (aged 35) | 1.87 m | 61 | 159 | (Romania) SCM Politehnica Timișoara |
| 13 | LW | Dmytro Artemenko | 18 January 1996 (aged 29) | 1.80 m | 26 | 101 | (Poland) KS Azoty-Puławy |
| 15 | CB | Oleksandr Tilte | 10 April 1995 (aged 30) | 1.98 m | 60 | 133 | (Turkey) Beşiktaş JK |
| 17 | LB | Ihor Turchenko | 4 December 2000 (aged 25) | 1.93 m | 29 | 156 | (France) Limoges Handball |
| 20 | LW | Pavlo Savytskyi | 2 March 2004 (aged 21) | 1.87 m | 6 | 5 | (Poland) KS Azoty-Puławy |
| 23 | P | Oleksandr Onufriyenko | 28 April 2001 (aged 24) | 1.94 m | 14 | 31 | (Slovenia) RK Celje |
| 25 | RW | Danylo Hlushak | 8 July 2000 (aged 25) | 1.91 m | 8 | 9 | (Romania) CSM Sighișoara |
| 27 | P | Ivan Burzak | 22 February 1998 (aged 27) | 2.02 m | 41 | 51 | (Poland) Ostrovia Ostrów Wielkopolski |
| 30 | LB | Maxym Strelnikov | 8 January 1997 (aged 29) | 2.04 m | 7 | 0 | (Poland) SPR Chrobry Głogów |
| 35 | LB | Taras Minotskyi | 15 January 2000 (aged 26) | 1.93 m | 30 | 40 | (France) Dunkerque HB |
| 51 | GK | Oleksii Novikov | 16 July 1999 (aged 26) | 2.02 m | 8 | 0 | (Austria) Handballclub Fivers Margareten |
| 53 | RB | Bogdan Cherkashchenko | 10 September 1996 (aged 29) | 2.02 m | 13 | 32 | (Poland) Górnik Zabrze |
| 55 | GK | Gennadiy Komok | 5 July 1987 (aged 38) | 1.97 m | 71 | 2 | (Romania) HC Buzău |

== Group D ==
=== Faroe Islands ===
The squad was announced on 9 December 2025.

Head coach: (Denmark) Peter Bredsdorff-Larsen

| No. | Pos. | Name | Date of birth (age) | Height | App. | Goals | Club |
|---|---|---|---|---|---|---|---|
| 1 | GK | Pauli Jacobsen | 11 July 2002 (aged 23) | 1.82 m | 32 | 0 | (Denmark) HØJ Elite |
| 2 | P | Helgi Hoydal | 1 May 1996 (aged 29) | 1.88 m | 45 | 54 | (Faroe Islands) H71 |
| 4 | LB | Bjarni í Selvindi | 27 August 2002 (aged 23) | 1.89 m | 10 | 8 | (Iceland) Valur |
| 6 | LW | Leivur Mortensen | 25 March 1999 (aged 26) | 1.85 m | 32 | 63 | (Denmark) Frederiksberg IF |
| 7 | RW | Allan Norðberg | 25 March 1994 (aged 31) | 1.87 m | 46 | 76 | (Iceland) Valur Reykjavík |
| 8 | P | Pætur Mikkjalsson | 11 May 1997 (aged 28) | 1.90 m | 29 | 22 | (Denmark) Team Sydhavsøerne |
| 9 | LW | Rói Berg Hansen | 11 April 1996 (aged 29) | 1.82 m | 49 | 83 | (Denmark) Køge Håndbold |
| 10 | RB | Kjartan Johansen | 17 April 1996 (aged 29) | 1.90 m | 53 | 90 | (Denmark) Vendsyssel Håndbold |
| 12 | GK | Tórður Skorheim Guttesen | 15 November 1997 (aged 28) | 1.88 m | 10 | 0 | (Faroe Islands) Kyndil |
| 17 | RW | Hákun West Av Teigum | 19 February 2002 (aged 23) | 1.89 m | 37 | 206 | (Germany) Füchse Berlin |
| 25 | RB | Vilhelm Poulsen | 20 August 1999 (aged 26) | 1.90 m | 41 | 76 | (Germany) TSV Hannover-Burgdorf |
| 30 | LB | Tróndur Mikkelsen | 1 July 2000 (aged 25) | 1.90 m | 32 | 46 | (Sweden) HF Karlskrona |
| 47 | P | Ísak Vedelsbøl | 18 October 2004 (aged 21) | 1.97 m | 16 | 24 | (Sweden) IK Sävehof |
| 61 | LB | Pauli Mittún | 30 May 2002 (aged 23) | 1.88 m | 29 | 26 | (Denmark) Team Sydhavsøerne |
| 71 | CB | Elias Ellefsen á Skipagøtu | 19 May 2002 (aged 23) | 1.87 m | 28 | 186 | (Germany) THW Kiel |
| 75 | CB | Rói Ellefsen á Skipagøtu | 10 October 2003 (aged 22) | 1.84 m | 20 | 23 | (Sweden) IF Hallby |
| 78 | LB | Óli Mittún | 10 June 2005 (aged 20) | 1.88 m | 24 | 101 | (Denmark) GOG Håndbold |
| 79 | P | Teis Horn Rasmussen | 31 March 1996 (aged 29) | 1.95 m | 41 | 84 | (Denmark) Ribe-Esbjerg HH |

=== Montenegro ===
A 24-player squad was announced on 23 December 2025. The final roster was revealed on 13 January 2026.

Head coach: (France) Didier Dinart

| No. | Pos. | Name | Date of birth (age) | Height | App. | Goals | Club |
|---|---|---|---|---|---|---|---|
| 2 | LW | Filip Vujović | 7 April 1996 (aged 29) | 1.88 m | 14 | 11 | (Montenegro) RK Sutjeska Nikšić |
| 6 | LW | Miloš Vujović | 5 September 1993 (aged 32) | 1.81 m | 71 | 195 | (Germany) VfL Gummersbach |
| 7 | RB | Stefan Čavor | 3 November 1994 (aged 31) | 1.97 m | 47 | 78 | (Germany) HSG Wetzlar |
| 9 | CB | Radojica Čepić | 29 July 2002 (aged 23) | 1.94 m | 31 | 82 | (Switzerland) HC Kriens-Luzern |
| 10 | P | Miodrag Ćorsović | 22 February 2000 (aged 25) | 1.98 m | 13 | 27 | (France) Dijon Métropole Handball |
| 11 | RB | Branko Vujović | 20 April 1998 (aged 27) | 1.96 m | 29 | 143 | (Romania) Dinamo București |
| 12 | GK | Haris Suljević | 26 February 2001 (aged 24) | 1.94 m | 6 | 0 | (Croatia) RK Zagreb |
| 13 | RW | Mirko Radović | 15 June 1990 (aged 35) | 1.85 m | 66 | 39 | (Montenegro) RK Lovćen |
| 17 | LB | Vasilije Kaluđerović | 3 October 1998 (aged 27) | 1.91 m | 28 | 31 | (Kuwait) Al-Qurain SC |
| 20 | LB | Stevan Vujović | 7 April 1990 (aged 35) | 1.90 m | 55 | 47 | (Kuwait) Al-Nassr |
| 22 | P | Luka Vujović | 11 April 2000 (aged 25) | 1.93 m | 8 | 9 | (Romania) CSM Sighişoara |
| 24 | LB | Miloš Božović | 10 December 1994 (aged 31) | 1.99 m | 44 | 67 | (Hungary) Győri ETO-UNI FKC |
| 26 | RB | Risto Vujačić | 4 December 1993 (aged 32) | 1.90 m | 31 | 42 | (Romania) SCM Politehnica Timișoara |
| 36 | P | Admir Pelidija | 26 August 1994 (aged 31) | 1.93 m | 13 | 7 | (Poland) Corotop Gwardia Opole |
| 37 | LB | Milorad Bakić | 9 February 2005 (aged 20) | 2.01 m | 3 | 0 | (Sweden) Eskilstuna Guif |
| 77 | RW | Luka Radović | 29 December 1997 (aged 28) | 1.80 m | 15 | 37 | (France) Saran Loiret Handball |
| 85 | GK | Mile Mijušković | 8 October 1985 (aged 40) | 1.92 m | 30 | 5 | (Spain) OAR Coruña |
| 87 | LB | Vuko Borozan | 9 April 1994 (aged 31) | 2.02 m | 28 | 52 | (North Macedonia) RK Vardar 1961 |

=== Slovenia ===
The squad was announced on 7 January 2026.

Head coach: Uroš Zorman

| No. | Pos. | Name | Date of birth (age) | Height | App. | Goals | Club |
|---|---|---|---|---|---|---|---|
| 1 | GK | Jože Baznik | 24 May 1993 (aged 32) | 1.87 m | 33 | 2 | (France) Pays d'Aix Université Club |
| 5 | LB | Nik Henigman | 4 December 1995 (aged 30) | 2.01 m | 91 | 124 | (North Macedonia) RK Eurofarm Pelister |
| 8 | RW | Blaž Janc | 20 November 1996 (aged 29) | 1.86 m | 126 | 472 | (Spain) FC Barcelona |
| 14 | CB | Domen Tajnik | 31 October 2000 (aged 25) | 1.83 m | 12 | 18 | (North Macedonia) RK Eurofarm Pelister |
| 16 | GK | Miljan Vujović | 27 August 2000 (aged 25) | 1.98 m | 16 | 0 | (Germany) TVB Stuttgart |
| 19 | LW | Staš Jovičić Slatinek | 6 December 2000 (aged 25) | 1.89 m | 49 | 105 | (Slovenia) RD Slovan |
| 20 | LW | Tilen Kodrin | 14 May 1994 (aged 31) | 1.92 m | 109 | 193 | (Germany) VfL Gummersbach |
| 24 | LW | Andraž Makuc | 24 July 2002 (aged 23) | 1.86 m | 4 | 13 | (Slovenia) RK Celje |
| 27 | P | Kristjan Horžen | 8 December 1999 (aged 26) | 1.92 m | 68 | 101 | (Germany) VfL Gummersbach |
| 28 | RB | Timotej Grmšek | 19 May 2000 (aged 25) | 1.94 m | 7 | 9 | (Slovenia) RK Trimo Trebnje |
| 30 | RW | Tim Cokan | 7 June 2001 (aged 24) | 1.91 m | 15 | 35 | (Slovenia) RD Slovan |
| 32 | LB | Tarik Mlivić | 21 April 2003 (aged 22) | 1.95 m | 8 | 27 | (Slovenia) RD Slovan |
| 33 | P | Stefan Žabić | 17 February 1999 (aged 26) | 2.03 m | 16 | 12 | (Slovenia) RD Slovan |
| 35 | CB | Domen Makuc | 1 July 2000 (aged 25) | 1.88 m | 38 | 110 | (Spain) FC Barcelona |
| 36 | P | Lan Grbić | 26 May 2000 (aged 25) | 1.94 m | 6 | 3 | (Slovenia) RK Trimo Trebnje |
| 51 | LB | Borut Mačkovšek | 11 September 1992 (aged 33) | 2.03 m | 158 | 409 | (Hungary) SC Pick Szeged |
| 77 | RW | Domen Novak | 26 April 1998 (aged 27) | 1.81 m | 59 | 113 | (Germany) SG Flensburg-Handewitt |
| 95 | P | Matic Suholežnik | 2 May 1995 (aged 30) | 2.02 m | 71 | 51 | (Slovenia) RD Slovan Ljubljana |

=== Switzerland ===
The squad was announced on 15 December 2025.

Head coach: Andy Schmid

| No. | Pos. | Name | Date of birth (age) | Height | App. | Goals | Club |
|---|---|---|---|---|---|---|---|
| 3 | P | Lucas Meister | 16 August 1996 (aged 29) | 1.96 m | 100 | 230 | (Switzerland) Kadetten Schaffhausen |
| 4 | LB | Lenny Rubin | 1 February 1996 (aged 29) | 2.05 m | 92 | 350 | (Germany) TVB Stuttgart |
| 8 | LB | Manuel Zehnder | 24 October 1999 (aged 26) | 1.90 m | 30 | 140 | (Germany) SC Magdeburg |
| 11 | CB | Felix Aellen | 11 October 2003 (aged 22) | 1.87 m | 29 | 68 | (Germany) ThSV Eisenach |
| 13 | RB | Michael Kusio | 31 August 1998 (aged 27) | 1.95 m | 29 | 16 | (Switzerland) BSV Bern |
| 16 | GK | Nikola Portner | 19 November 1993 (aged 32) | 1.94 m | 148 | 33 | (Germany) SC Magdeburg |
| 17 | P | Samuel Röthlisberger | 15 August 1996 (aged 29) | 1.99 m | 98 | 24 | (Germany) TVB 1898 Stuttgart |
| 18 | RB | Dimitrij Küttel | 18 February 1994 (aged 31) | 1.91 m | 98 | 187 | (Switzerland) Kadetten Schaffhausen |
| 20 | LB | Luka Maros | 20 March 1994 (aged 31) | 1.96 m | 89 | 221 | (Switzerland) Kadetten Schaffhausen |
| 21 | RW | Gino Steenaerts | 5 May 2005 (aged 20) | 1.84 m | 22 | 68 | (Germany) Rhein-Neckar Löwen |
| 23 | P | Lukas Laube | 22 April 2000 (aged 25) | 1.92 m | 44 | 94 | (Germany) THW Kiel |
| 25 | RW | Levin Wanner | 18 August 2000 (aged 25) | 1.83 m | 11 | 10 | (Switzerland) BSV Bern |
| 28 | CB | Luca Sigrist | 4 October 2005 (aged 20) | 1.86 m | 19 | 42 | (Switzerland) HC Kriens-Luzern |
| 29 | LW | Samuel Zehnder | 29 February 2000 (aged 25) | 1.83 m | 69 | 148 | (Germany) TBV Lemgo |
| 30 | P | Joël Willecke | 23 November 2003 (aged 22) | 2.02 m | 39 | 10 | (Germany) TBV Lemgo |
| 35 | LW | Noam Leopold | 17 July 2002 (aged 23) | 1.86 m | 25 | 73 | (France) HBC Nantes |
| 38 | GK | Jannis Scheidiger | 8 August 2002 (aged 23) | 1.93 m | 22 | 2 | (Switzerland) HC Kriens-Luzern |
| 40 | GK | Mathieu Seravalli | 15 September 2004 (aged 21) | 1.98 m | 10 | 0 | (Switzerland) BSV Bern |
| 44 | LB | Mehdi Ben Romdhane | 2 December 2001 (aged 24) | 1.89 m | 44 | 60 | (Switzerland) Kadetten Schaffhausen |

== Group E ==
=== Croatia ===
A 20-player squad was announced on 9 January 2026.

Head coach: (Iceland) Dagur Sigurðsson

| No. | Pos. | Name | Date of birth (age) | Height | App. | Goals | Club |
|---|---|---|---|---|---|---|---|
| 1 | GK | Dominik Kuzmanović | 15 August 2002 (aged 23) | 1.93 m | 45 | 4 | (Germany) VfL Gummersbach |
| 6 | RW | Mario Šoštarić | 25 November 1992 (aged 33) | 1.93 m | 47 | 185 | (Hungary) SC Pick Szeged |
| 9 | RB | Luka Lovre Klarica | 25 September 2001 (aged 24) | 1.98 m | 47 | 111 | (Croatia) RK Zagreb |
| 10 | P | Josip Šimić | 10 May 2000 (aged 25) | 1.94 m | 15 | 14 | (Germany) HSG Wetzlar |
| 11 | LB | Zvonimir Srna | 18 January 1998 (aged 27) | 2.02 m | 50 | 122 | (France) Montpellier Handball |
| 12 | GK | Matej Mandić | 2 May 2002 (aged 23) | 2.04 m | 37 | 2 | (Germany) SC Magdeburg |
| 13 | CB | Ivano Pavlović | 19 March 2003 (aged 22) | 1.90 m | 14 | 20 | (Croatia) RK Zagreb |
| 14 | LB | Diano Ćeško | 17 April 2004 (aged 21) | 1.96 m | 5 | 9 | (Bosnia and Herzegovina) RK Izviđač |
| 20 | RB | Mateo Maraš | 17 December 2000 (aged 25) | 2.03 m | 47 | 84 | (France) Paris Saint-Germain |
| 23 | P | Zlatko Raužan | 14 February 2002 (aged 23) | 1.89 m | 3 | 4 | (Croatia) MRK Sesvete |
| 30 | LB | Marko Mamić | 6 March 1994 (aged 31) | 2.02 m | 106 | 123 | (Germany) SC DHfK Leipzig |
| 33 | CB | Luka Cindrić | 5 July 1993 (aged 32) | 1.81 m | 128 | 354 | (Hungary) Veszprém KC |
| 39 | LW | David Mandić | 14 September 1997 (aged 28) | 1.87 m | 64 | 149 | (Germany) MT Melsungen |
| 41 | CB | Tin Lučin | 16 August 1999 (aged 26) | 1.96 m | 55 | 143 | (Croatia) RK Nexe Našice |
| 43 | GK | Dino Slavić | 4 December 1992 (aged 33) | 1.85 m | 10 | 0 | (France) Limoges Handball |
| 51 | RB | Ivan Martinović | 6 January 1998 (aged 28) | 1.94 m | 66 | 308 | (Hungary) Veszprém KC |
| 52 | P | Leon Šušnja | 5 August 1993 (aged 32) | 2.04 m | 42 | 24 | (Poland) Wisła Płock |
| 57 | RW | Filip Glavaš | 6 May 1997 (aged 28) | 1.83 m | 62 | 209 | (Croatia) RK Zagreb |
| 62 | LW | Marin Jelinić | 7 December 1996 (aged 29) | 1.94 m | 58 | 153 | (Hungary) SC Pick Szeged |
| 93 | P | Veron Načinović | 7 March 2000 (aged 25) | 2.04 m | 48 | 98 | (Germany) THW Kiel |

=== Georgia ===
The squad was announced on 7 January 2026.

Head coach: Tite Kalandadze

| No. | Pos. | Name | Date of birth (age) | Height | App. | Goals | Club |
|---|---|---|---|---|---|---|---|
| 1 | GK | Gigi Rukhadze | 15 March 2004 (aged 21) | 1.85 m | 0 | 0 | (Croatia) RK Bjelovar |
| 3 | P | George Lapiashvili | 12 November 2000 (aged 25) | 1.95 m | 22 | 13 | (Georgia (country)) B.S.B. Batumi |
| 5 | LW | Vakhtang Khelisupali | 13 January 2005 (aged 21) | 1.90 m | 2 | 2 | (Georgia (country)) Mimi Samtredia Tbilisi |
| 7 | LW | Khazein Rustamov | 9 December 1998 (aged 27) | 1.80 m | 34 | 51 | (Romania) CSM Constanța |
| 8 | RB | Vakhtang Kharebashvili | 19 October 2008 (aged 17) | 1.90 m | 3 | 0 | (Lithuania) Dragūnas Klaipėda |
| 9 | CB | Giorgi Areshidze | 23 July 2004 (aged 21) | 1.90 m | 4 | 4 | (Georgia (country)) HC Pegasi |
| 10 | CB | Irakli Kbilashvili | 2 October 1998 (aged 27) | 1.89 m | 38 | 122 | (Romania) AHC Potaissa Turda |
| 11 | RB | Giorgi Tskhovrebadze | 19 February 2001 (aged 24) | 1.94 m | 33 | 237 | (Croatia) RK Zagreb |
| 12 | GK | Zurab Tsintsadze | 3 October 1996 (aged 29) | 1.85 m | 28 | 5 | (Poland) KPR Legionowo |
| 18 | P | Erekle Arsenashvili | 18 October 1998 (aged 27) | 1.97 m | 32 | 105 | (France) Tremblay Handball |
| 24 | RB | Zurab Gogava | 14 September 1998 (aged 27) | 1.96 m | 16 | 2 | (Germany) TBV Lemgo |
| 27 | LB | Nikoloz Kalandadze | 27 July 2002 (aged 23) | 1.98 m | 14 | 35 | (France) Chambéry Savoie Mont-Blanc Handball |
| 28 | LB | Davit Grishikashvili | 25 June 2007 (aged 18) | 1.98 m | 0 | 0 | (North Macedonia) HC Butel Skopje |
| 34 | LB | Miriani Gavashelishvili | 21 September 2000 (aged 25) | 1.97 m | 26 | 11 | (Poland) KPR Ostrovia Ostrów Wielkopolski |
| 71 | RW | Giorgi Dikhaminjia | 21 June 1997 (aged 28) | 1.88 m | 44 | 101 | (Iceland) KA Handball |
| 87 | GK | David Nikabadze | 16 June 1999 (aged 26) | 1.99 m | 16 | 1 | (Russia) SGAU Saratov |

=== Netherlands ===
The squad was announced on 15 January 2026.

Head coach: (Sweden) Staffan Olsson

| No. | Pos. | Name | Date of birth (age) | Height | App. | Goals | Club |
|---|---|---|---|---|---|---|---|
| 3 | CB | Ivar Stavast | 13 January 1998 (aged 28) | 1.91 m | 67 | 118 | (Germany) HC Elbflorenz |
| 5 | LW | Rutger ten Velde | 5 March 1997 (aged 28) | 1.78 m | 89 | 351 | (Germany) Frisch Auf Göppingen |
| 11 | GK | Jorick Pol | 26 February 2004 (aged 21) | 1.99 m | 13 | 0 | (Germany) TVB Stuttgart |
| 12 | GK | Matthias Dorgelo | 31 October 2002 (aged 23) | 2.00 m | 16 | 2 | (Denmark) SønderjyskE Herrehåndbold |
| 14 | RW | Bobby Schagen | 13 January 1990 (aged 36) | 1.90 m | 150 | 452 | (Germany) TBV Lemgo |
| 15 | P | Lars Kooij | 11 August 2000 (aged 25) | 1.99 m | 41 | 96 | (Germany) Bergischer HC |
| 17 | LW | Kaj Geenen | 6 May 2003 (aged 22) | 1.86 m | 37 | 40 | (Germany) HSV Hamburg |
| 20 | RB | Niels Versteijnen | 3 February 2000 (aged 25) | 2.00 m | 67 | 185 | (Germany) TBV Lemgo |
| 21 | P | Martijn Kleijkers | 22 February 2001 (aged 24) | 1.88 m | 24 | 36 | (Belgium) Sporting Neerpelt |
| 22 | CB | Luc Steins | 22 March 1995 (aged 30) | 1.73 m | 127 | 370 | (France) Paris Saint-Germain |
| 24 | P | Driek Manders | 29 November 2004 (aged 21) | 1.97 m | 5 | 6 | (Netherlands) HC Bevo |
| 25 | LB | Destin van Dijk | 2 November 2001 (aged 24) | 2.02 m | 9 | 1 | (Hungary) Szigetszentmiklósi KSK |
| 26 | LB | Bram van de Vreede | 16 April 2007 (aged 18) | 1.98 m | 5 | 2 | (Germany) ASV Hamm-Westfalen |
| 27 | RW | Alec Smit | 15 May 1999 (aged 26) | 1.82 m | 67 | 84 | (Denmark) Aalborg Håndbold |
| 29 | RB | Marek Skwarczynski | 22 July 2006 (aged 19) | 1.92 m | 2 | 0 | (Germany) ATSV Habenhausen |
| 34 | RB | Tom Jansen | 18 June 1998 (aged 27) | 1.99 m | 34 | 52 | (Germany) TuS Ferndorf |
| 77 | LB | Dani Baijens | 5 May 1998 (aged 27) | 1.82 m | 102 | 320 | (Germany) Rhein-Neckar Löwen |
| 97 | LB | Reinier Taboada | 2 June 1997 (aged 28) | 1.92 m | 5 | 11 | (Portugal) Benfica |

=== Sweden ===
The squad was announced on 6 January 2026.

Head coach: Michael Apelgren

| No. | Pos. | Name | Date of birth (age) | Height | App. | Goals | Club |
|---|---|---|---|---|---|---|---|
| 2 | LB | Jonathan Carlsbogård | 19 April 1995 (aged 30) | 1.95 m | 92 | 182 | (Spain) FC Barcelona |
| 5 | P | Max Darj | 27 September 1991 (aged 34) | 1.92 m | 134 | 162 | (Germany) Füchse Berlin |
| 6 | P | Felix Möller | 4 September 2002 (aged 23) | 1.96 m | 37 | 66 | (Denmark) Aalborg Håndbold |
| 11 | RW | Daniel Pettersson | 6 May 1992 (aged 33) | 1.79 m | 101 | 228 | (Germany) SC Magdeburg |
| 12 | GK | Andreas Palicka | 10 July 1986 (aged 39) | 1.89 m | 177 | 19 | (Norway) Kolstad Håndball |
| 13 | RW | Sebastian Karlsson | 21 January 1995 (aged 30) | 1.78 m | 38 | 111 | (France) Paris Saint-Germain |
| 15 | LW | Hampus Wanne | 10 December 1993 (aged 32) | 1.85 m | 117 | 468 | (Denmark) HØJ Elite |
| 19 | CB | Felix Claar | 5 January 1997 (aged 29) | 1.92 m | 86 | 243 | (Germany) SC Magdeburg |
| 20 | GK | Mikael Appelgren | 6 September 1989 (aged 36) | 1.92 m | 103 | 2 | (Hungary) Veszprém KC |
| 23 | RB | Albin Lagergren | 11 September 1992 (aged 33) | 1.86 m | 133 | 413 | (Germany) SC Magdeburg |
| 24 | CB | Jim Gottfridsson | 2 September 1992 (aged 33) | 1.92 m | 178 | 537 | (Hungary) SC Pick Szeged |
| 25 | LB | Nikola Roganović | 27 July 2006 (aged 19) | 1.99 m | 6 | 12 | (Sweden) HK Malmö |
| 27 | CB | Axel Månsson | 10 May 2005 (aged 20) | 1.78 m | 5 | 4 | (Sweden) IFK Kristianstad |
| 29 | RB | Edwin Aspenbäck | 8 July 2000 (aged 25) | 1.96 m | 12 | 4 | (Germany) Rhein-Neckar Löwen |
| 32 | P | Oscar Bergendahl | 8 March 1995 (aged 30) | 1.92 m | 67 | 105 | (Germany) SC Magdeburg |
| 33 | RB | Lukas Sandell | 3 February 1997 (aged 28) | 1.91 m | 80 | 212 | (Germany) Rhein-Neckar Löwen |
| 42 | LB | Eric Johansson | 28 June 2000 (aged 25) | 1.97 m | 54 | 151 | (Germany) THW Kiel |
| 43 | LW | Felix Montebovi | 28 November 2005 (aged 20) | 1.75 m | 4 | 5 | (Sweden) HK Malmö |
| 51 | GK | Fabian Norsten | 11 July 2000 (aged 25) | 1.96 m | 19 | 0 | (Denmark) Aalborg Håndbold |

== Group F ==
=== Hungary ===
A 20-player squad was announced on 17 December 2025.

Head coach: (Spain) Chema Rodríguez

| No. | Pos. | Name | Date of birth (age) | Height | App. | Goals | Club |
|---|---|---|---|---|---|---|---|
| 1 | GK | Arián Andó | 29 January 1999 (aged 26) | 1.90 m | 11 | 0 | (Hungary) MOL-Tatabánya KC |
| 2 | P | Adrián Sipos | 8 March 1990 (aged 35) | 1.98 m | 102 | 48 | (Germany) MT Melsungen |
| 7 | LW | Bendegúz Bóka | 2 October 1993 (aged 32) | 1.95 m | 106 | 255 | (Hungary) Balatonfüredi KSE |
| 9 | LB | Andrej Pergel | 18 June 2003 (aged 22) | 1.97 m | 4 | 11 | (Spain) CB Ciudad de Logroño |
| 11 | LB | Patrik Ligetvári | 13 February 1996 (aged 29) | 2.05 m | 123 | 94 | (Hungary) Veszprém KC |
| 13 | P | Tamás Papp | 11 November 2002 (aged 23) | 1.83 m | 4 | 9 | (Hungary) MOL-Tatabánya KC |
| 18 | LW | Bence Krakovszki | 9 July 2002 (aged 23) | 1.87 m | 20 | 37 | (Hungary) MOL-Tatabánya KC |
| 24 | CB | Gergő Fazekas | 31 October 2003 (aged 22) | 1.91 m | 49 | 91 | (Poland) Wisła Płock |
| 26 | RW | Pedro Rodríguez Álvarez | 22 August 1990 (aged 35) | 1.93 m | 50 | 123 | (Hungary) MOL-Tatabánya KC |
| 30 | LB | Zoltán Szita | 10 February 1998 (aged 27) | 1.96 m | 95 | 237 | (Poland) Wisła Płock |
| 32 | GK | Kristóf Palasics | 19 April 2002 (aged 23) | 1.99 m | 36 | 1 | (Germany) MT Melsungen |
| 39 | LB | Richárd Bodó | 13 March 1993 (aged 32) | 2.03 m | 132 | 380 | (Hungary) OTP Bank-Pick Szeged |
| 43 | RB | Zoran Ilić | 2 January 2002 (aged 24) | 1.97 m | 52 | 88 | (Poland) Wisła Płock |
| 45 | P | Miklós Rosta | 14 February 1999 (aged 26) | 2.03 m | 83 | 227 | (Romania) CS Dinamo București |
| 61 | GK | László Bartucz | 5 November 1991 (aged 34) | 1.97 m | 44 | 0 | (Germany) MT Melsungen |
| 71 | RB | Máté Ónodi-Jánoskúti | 17 June 2002 (aged 23) | 1.93 m | 18 | 37 | (France) USAM Nîmes Gard |
| 72 | CB | Péter Lukács | 30 July 2002 (aged 23) | 1.90 m | 5 | 4 | (Norway) Elverum Håndball |
| 77 | CB | Egon Hanusz | 25 September 1997 (aged 28) | 1.77 m | 63 | 93 | (France) Cesson Rennes MHB |
| 91 | RW | Bence Imre | 15 October 2002 (aged 23) | 1.85 m | 37 | 167 | (Germany) THW Kiel |
| 93 | RW | Benjámin Szilágyi | 18 May 2003 (aged 22) | 1.89 m | 1 | 3 | (Hungary) OTP Bank-Pick Szeged |

=== Iceland ===
The squad was announced on 18 December 2025.

Head coach: Snorri Guðjónsson

| No. | Pos. | Name | Date of birth (age) | Height | App. | Goals | Club |
|---|---|---|---|---|---|---|---|
| 1 | GK | Björgvin Páll Gústavsson | 24 May 1985 (aged 40) | 1.93 m | 287 | 26 | (Iceland) Valur |
| 2 | RW | Óðinn Þór Ríkharðsson | 23 October 1997 (aged 28) | 1.83 m | 58 | 178 | (Switzerland) Kadetten Schaffhausen |
| 3 | CB | Janus Daði Smárason | 1 January 1995 (aged 31) | 1.84 m | 100 | 177 | (Hungary) SC Pick Szeged |
| 6 | CB | Elvar Ásgeirsson | 4 September 1994 (aged 31) | 1.94 m | 21 | 24 | (Denmark) SGI-Håndbold |
| 7 | RB | Viggó Kristjánsson | 9 December 1993 (aged 32) | 1.87 m | 73 | 219 | (Germany) HC Erlangen |
| 8 | LW | Bjarki Már Elísson | 16 May 1990 (aged 35) | 1.90 m | 128 | 426 | (Hungary) Veszprém KC |
| 9 | LB | Elvar Örn Jónsson | 31 August 1997 (aged 28) | 1.85 m | 93 | 214 | (Germany) SC Magdeburg |
| 10 | CB | Gísli Þorgeir Kristjánsson | 30 July 1999 (aged 26) | 1.86 m | 75 | 171 | (Germany) SC Magdeburg |
| 11 | P | Ýmir Örn Gíslason | 15 July 1997 (aged 28) | 1.96 m | 108 | 48 | (Germany) Frisch Auf Göppingen |
| 14 | RB | Ómar Ingi Magnússon | 12 March 1997 (aged 28) | 1.86 m | 94 | 341 | (Germany) SC Magdeburg |
| 15 | LB | Þorsteinn Leó Gunnarsson | 13 November 2002 (aged 23) | 2.08 m | 19 | 39 | (Portugal) FC Porto |
| 16 | GK | Viktor Gísli Hallgrímsson | 24 July 2000 (aged 25) | 2.04 m | 74 | 2 | (Spain) FC Barcelona |
| 18 | P | Elliði Snær Viðarsson | 15 November 1998 (aged 27) | 1.94 m | 64 | 138 | (Germany) VfL Gummersbach |
| 19 | LW | Orri Freyr Þorkelsson | 25 June 1999 (aged 26) | 1.84 m | 32 | 106 | (Portugal) Sporting CP |
| 21 | P | Arnar Freyr Arnarsson | 14 March 1996 (aged 29) | 2.01 m | 107 | 115 | (Germany) MT Melsungen |
| 22 | RW | Sigvaldi Guðjónsson | 4 July 1994 (aged 31) | 1.92 m | 85 | 230 | (Denmark) Kolstad Håndball |
| 24 | RB | Teitur Örn Einarsson | 23 September 1998 (aged 27) | 1.90 m | 48 | 46 | (Germany) VfL Gummersbach |
| 25 | CB | Haukur Þrastarson | 14 April 2001 (aged 24) | 1.93 m | 47 | 64 | (Germany) Rhein-Neckar Löwen |
| 27 | LB | Einar Þorsteinn Ólafsson | 30 September 2001 (aged 24) | 2.00 m | 27 | 7 | (Germany) HSV Hamburg |
| 34 | CB | Andri Már Rúnarsson | 21 August 2002 (aged 23) | 1.88 m | 8 | 8 | (Germany) HC Erlangen |

=== Italy ===
A 20-player squad was announced on 23 December 2025.

Head coach: (Germany) Bob Hanning

| No. | Pos. | Name | Date of birth (age) | Height | App. | Goals | Club |
|---|---|---|---|---|---|---|---|
| 1 | GK | Domenico Ebner | 26 April 1994 (aged 31) | 1.92 m | 70 | 10 | (Germany) SC DHfK Leipzig |
| 2 | RW | Leo Prantner | 24 November 2001 (aged 24) | 1.78 m | 45 | 42 | (Germany) Füchse Berlin |
| 5 | LW | Gianluca Dapiran | 9 May 1994 (aged 31) | 1.93 m | 80 | 88 | (Italy) Cassano Magnago HC |
| 6 | LB | Davide Bulzamini | 3 February 1995 (aged 30) | 1.94 m | 93 | 115 | (Germany) 1. VfL Potsdam |
| 8 | CB | Giacomo Savini | 19 May 1998 (aged 27) | 1.85 m | 80 | 57 | (Italy) Cassano Magnago HC |
| 9 | P | Gabriele Sontacchi | 19 September 2003 (aged 22) | 1.90 m | 18 | 9 | (Germany) 1. VfL Potsdam |
| 10 | CB | Marco Mengon | 3 January 2000 (aged 26) | 1.92 m | 62 | 109 | (Germany) 1. VfL Potsdam |
| 11 | RW | Nicolo D'Antino | 22 June 1999 (aged 26) | 1.72 m | 55 | 43 | (Spain) BM Atlético Valladolid |
| 15 | LB | Simone Mengon | 3 January 2000 (aged 26) | 1.92 m | 54 | 99 | (Germany) TVB Stuttgart |
| 19 | RB | Thomas Bortoli | 20 February 2002 (aged 23) | 1.94 m | 56 | 60 | (France) Istres Provence Handball |
| 20 | RB | Davide Pugliese | 12 June 2001 (aged 24) | 1.87 m | 14 | 4 | (Spain) Club Balonmano Nava |
| 23 | LB | Christian Manojlovic | 14 August 2005 (aged 20) | 1.87 m | 25 | 22 | (Romania) SCM Politehnica Timișoara |
| 24 | LB | Mikael Helmersson | 29 September 2003 (aged 22) | 1.99 m | 23 | 44 | (Germany) HSC 2000 Coburg |
| 29 | LW | Jeremi Pirani | 18 January 1994 (aged 31) | 1.78 m | 17 | 23 | (France) Tremblay Handball |
| 30 | P | Tommaso Romei | 30 March 2003 (aged 22) | 1.90 m | 23 | 15 | (Austria) Bregenz Handball |
| 32 | P | Andrea Parisini | 18 November 1994 (aged 31) | 1.94 m | 109 | 183 | (France) Limoges Handball |
| 40 | LW | Simon Sirot | 18 April 2007 (aged 18) | 1.78 m | 3 | 1 | (Germany) Füchse Berlin |
| 51 | GK | Pau Panitti | 18 July 2004 (aged 21) | 1.95 m | 2 | 0 | (Spain) Club Balonmano Granollers |
| 90 | GK | Giovanni Pavani | 3 August 2000 (aged 25) | 1.84 m | 16 | 0 | (Italy) Handball Sassari |

=== Poland ===
The squad was announced on 13 January 2026.

Head coach: (Spain) Jota González

| No. | Pos. | Name | Date of birth (age) | Height | App. | Goals | Club |
|---|---|---|---|---|---|---|---|
| 1 | GK | Miłosz Wałach | 23 November 2001 (aged 24) | 1.95 m | 4 | 0 | (North Macedonia) RK Vardar 1961 |
| 2 | LB | Damian Przytuła | 27 November 1998 (aged 27) | 2.00 m | 58 | 122 | (Croatia) RK Zagreb |
| 3 | RB | Michał Daszek | 27 June 1992 (aged 33) | 1.82 m | 155 | 398 | (Poland) Orlen Wisła Płock |
| 4 | CB | Piotr Jędraszczyk | 9 October 2001 (aged 24) | 1.80 m | 50 | 119 | (Poland) Industria Kielce |
| 5 | CB | Michał Olejniczak | 31 January 2001 (aged 24) | 1.95 m | 82 | 154 | (Poland) Industria Kielce |
| 12 | LB | Ariel Pietrasik | 21 October 1999 (aged 26) | 2.02 m | 55 | 116 | (Switzerland) Kadetten Schaffhausen |
| 17 | RB | Andrzej Widomski | 6 February 2003 (aged 22) | 1.90 m | 14 | 28 | (North Macedonia) RK Eurofarm Pelister |
| 23 | RW | Arkadiusz Moryto | 31 August 1997 (aged 28) | 1.82 m | 108 | 510 | (Poland) Industria Kielce |
| 25 | LW | Piotr Jarosiewicz | 28 June 1998 (aged 27) | 1.80 m | 30 | 41 | (Poland) Industria Kielce |
| 26 | RW | Marek Marciniak | 21 September 1995 (aged 30) | 1.88 m | 13 | 24 | (North Macedonia) RK Vardar 1961 |
| 28 | P | Maciej Gębala | 10 January 1994 (aged 32) | 2.00 m | 116 | 151 | (Germany) HC Erlangen |
| 30 | RB | Wiktor Tomczak | 22 July 2002 (aged 23) | 2.00 m | 6 | 2 | (Poland) PGE Wybrzeże Gdańsk |
| 35 | CB | Paweł Paterek | 17 December 2000 (aged 25) | 1.86 m | 31 | 66 | (Poland) KGHM Chrobry Głogów |
| 36 | P | Dawid Dawydzik | 7 December 1994 (aged 31) | 2.00 m | 57 | 75 | (Poland) Orlen Wisła Płock |
| 38 | P | Sebastian Kaczor | 15 December 2001 (aged 24) | 1.96 m | 3 | 4 | (France) USAM Nîmes Gard |
| 44 | LW | Mikołaj Czapliński | 11 August 2000 (aged 25) | 1.88 m | 34 | 86 | (Poland) PGE Wybrzeże Gdańsk |
| 48 | LB | Tomasz Gębala | 23 November 1995 (aged 30) | 2.12 m | 49 | 135 | (Poland) PGE Wybrzeże Gdańsk |
| 50 | GK | Jakub Skrzyniarz | 6 June 1996 (aged 29) | 1.89 m | 29 | 0 | (Spain) Irudek Bidasoa Irún |
| 78 | P | Wiktor Jankowski | 12 October 2001 (aged 24) | 2.00 m | 5 | 2 | (North Macedonia) RK Vardar 1961 |

== Statistics ==
=== Player representation by club ===
Clubs with 10 or more players represented are listed.

| Club | Players |
|---|---|
| (North Macedonia) RK Alkaloid | 13 |
| (Spain) FC Barcelona | 11 |
| (Denmark) Aalborg Håndbold | 10 |
| (Germany) THW Kiel | 10 |

== Notable players ==
=== Oldest and youngest players ===
| Oldest player | Age |
|---|---|
| (Romania) Mihai Cătălin Popescu | 15 March 1985 (aged 40) |
| Youngest player | Age |
| (Georgia (country)) Vakhtang Kharebashvili | 19 October 2008 (age 17) |

=== Tallest and shortest players ===
| Tallest player | Height |
|---|---|
| (Czech Republic) Daniel Bláha (Poland) Tomasz Gębala | 2.12 m |
| Shortest player | Height |
| (Italy) Nicolo D'Antino | 1.72 m |

=== Most caps and goals ===
| Player | Caps (over 200) |
|---|---|
| (Iceland) Björgvin Páll Gústavsson | 284 |
| (Denmark) Mads Mensah Larsen | 216 |
| (Austria) Janko Božović | 200 |
| Player | Goals (over 500) |
| (Norway) Sander Sagosen | 907 |
| (Denmark) Mathias Gidsel | 578 |
| (Austria) Janko Božović | 569 |
| (Sweden) Jim Gottfridsson | 535 |
| (France) Dika Mem | 521 |
| (Austria) Nikola Bilyk | 518 |
| (Poland) Arkadiusz Moryto | 510 |
| (Spain) Alex Dujshebaev | 504 |
