= Marko Božinovski =

Macedonian handball player (2000–2021)

Personal information
- Nationality: Macedonian
- Born: 11 September 2000 Skopje, Macedonia
- Died: 3 June 2021 (aged 20)
- Height: 1.88 m (6 ft 2 in)

Sport
- Sport: Handball
- Position: Left wing

Senior clubs
- Years: Team
- 2018–2019: RK Metalurg Skopje
- 2019–2021: HC Butel Skopje

Marko Božinovski (Macedonian: Марко Божиновски) (11 September 2000 – 2 June 2021) was a Macedonian handball player for HC Butel Skopje and the U-18 Macedonian national team.

== Professional career ==
On 27 December 2020, he scored 10 goals for HC Butel Skopje in the game against Metalurg Skopje.

== Legacy ==
His parents, Aleksandra and Riste Bozinovski have established the Marko Bozinovski Foundation to preserve the memory of their son's life and work. The goal of the foundation is to help many young people succeed in sports, especially those who are talented but lack the resources to invest in the development of their careers.
