= Teodor Todeski =

Macedonian handball player

Personal information
- Nationality: Macedonian
- Born: 3 September 2002 (age 24) Prilep, Macedonia
- Height: 2.00 m (6 ft 7 in)

Sport
- Sport: Handball
- Position: Left Back
- Current club: HC Butel Skopje

Youth career
- Years: Team
- –: RK Prilep 2010
- 2018–2021: RK Metalurg Skopje

Senior clubs
- Years: Team
- 2020–2021: RK Metalurg Skopje
- 2021–2023: RK Alkaloid
- 2023–2024: RK Multi Essence
- 2024–: HC Butel Skopje

Teodor Todeski (Macedonian: Теодор Тодески; born 3 September 2002) is a Macedonian handball player who plays for HC Butel Skopje.
