= 2026–27 Regional Handball League =

- League: Regional Handball League
- Duration: 23 September 2026 – 17 March 2027 (Regular season); 24 – 25 April 2027 (Final Four)
- Teams: 10; Montenegro (2 teams); North Macedonia (4 teams); Serbia (4 teams)

The 2026–27 Regional Handball League is the inaugural season of the Regional Handball League. Ten teams from Montenegro, North Macedonia, and Serbia are participating in this year's competition.

The 10 teams will be split into two groups of five teams and play a double round-robin, with each team playing the others twice, once at home and once away. The top two teams in each group will advance to the Final Four.

== Team information ==
Location of teams of the 2026–27 Regional Handball League group phase.
Blue: Group A; Red: Group B

Country	Team	City
Montenegro	Budvanska rivijera	Budva
Montenegro	Lovćen	Cetinje
North Macedonia	Alkaloid	Skopje
North Macedonia	Eurofarm Pelister	Bitola
North Macedonia	Ohrid	Ohrid
North Macedonia	Vardar 1961	Skopje
Serbia	Dinamo	Pančevo
Serbia	Dubočica 54	Leskovac
Serbia	Partizan	Belgrade
Serbia	Vojvodina	Novi Sad

== Group stage ==
=== Group A ===
Pos	Team	Pld	W	D	L	GF	GA	GD	Pts	Qualification	PEL	PAR	ALK	DUB	LOV
1	(North Macedonia) Eurofarm Pelister	3	3	0	0	118	88	+30	6	Final Four	—	35–31	27 Mar	38–24	45–33
2	(Serbia) Partizan	3	2	0	1	109	97	+12	4	Final Four	17 Mar	—	3 Feb	39–31	2 Dec
3	(North Macedonia) Alkaloid	3	2	0	1	126	105	+21	4		21 Nov	31–39	—	15 Dec	54–39
4	(Serbia) Dubočica 54	3	1	0	2	85	106	−21	2		3 Feb	5 Dec	11 Oct	—	17 Mar
5	(Montenegro) Lovćen	4	0	0	4	128	170	−42	0		15 Dec	8 Dec	29–40	29–30	—

Updated to match(es) played on 31 August 2026. Source: RHL

=== Group B ===
Pos	Team	Pld	W	D	L	GF	GA	GD	Pts	Qualification	OHD	VAR	BDR	VOJ	DIN
1	(North Macedonia) Ohrid	3	3	0	0	81	67	+14	6	Final Four	—	6 Feb	22 Dec	29–19	31 Jan
2	(North Macedonia) Vardar 1961	1	1	0	0	36	30	+6	2	Final Four	3 Oct	—	23 Sep	36–30	18 Dec
3	(Montenegro) Budvanska rivijera	2	1	0	1	52	53	−1	2		20–22	17 Mar	—	3 Feb	15 Dec
4	(Serbia) Vojvodina	3	1	0	2	79	94	−15	2		9 Dec	15 Dec	1 Sep	—	5 Dec
5	(Serbia) Dinamo Pančevo	3	0	0	3	88	92	−4	0		28–30	22 Dec	31–32	29–30	—

Updated to match(es) played on 12 September 2026. Source: RHL

== Final Four ==
=== Bracket ===
Semi-finals
24 April
24 April

Final
25 April
Third place
25 April
