= Nejc Cehte =

Slovenian handball player (born 1992)

Personal information
- Nationality: Slovenian
- Born: 4 September 1992 (age 34) Brežice, Slovenia
- Height: 1.96 m (6 ft 5 in)

Sport
- Sport: Handball
- Position: Right back
- Current club: RK Alkaloid
- Number: 17

Youth career
- Years: Team
- –2007: RK Krško

Senior clubs
- Years: Team
- 2007–2013: RK Krško
- 2013–2018: RK Gorenje Velenje
- 2018–2022: TSV Hannover-Burgdorf
- 2022–2023: GOG Håndbold
- 2023–2025: RK Eurofarm Pelister
- 2025–2026: Füchse Berlin
- 2026–: RK Alkaloid
National team
Years	Team	Apps	(Gls)
2020–	Slovenia	83	(146)
- Updated on 24 January 2026

Nejc Cehte (born 4 September 1992) is a Slovenian handball player who plays for RK Alkaloid and the Slovenia national team. He represented the country at the 2020 European Men's Handball Championship. He also represented Slovenia at the 2024 Summer Olympics.

Cehte was raised in Stolovnik, Slovenia. His older brother, Klemen Cehte, inspired him to play handball.

== Honours ==
GOG Håndbold

- Danish Handball League: 2023
- Danish Handball Cup: 2022

RK Eurofarm Pelister

- Macedonian Super League: 2024, 2025
