= Ahmed Hadjali =

Algerian handball player (born 1976)

Personal information
- Nationality: Algerian
- Born: 6 June 1976 (age 50) Boghni, Algeria
- Height: 190 cm (75 in)

Sport
- Sport: Handball
- Position: Right Wing
- Current club: Retired

Senior clubs
- Years: Team
- 1997–2001: (France) US Ivry
- 2001–2004: (France) Massy Ensonne HB
- 2004–2006: Tremblay-en-France Handball
- 2006–2009: (France) US Ivry
- 2009–2010: (France) HBC Nantes
- 2010–2012: (France) Angers Noyant
- 2012–2014: (France) Amiens HB
National team
- Years: Team
- –: Algeria

Ahmed Hadjali (born June 16, 1976) is an Algerian handball player currently playing for French club US Ivry Handball and the Algerian National Team. He plays as a right wing.

Hadjali was selected in the Algerian team for the 2009 World Men's Handball Championship in Croatia.
