= Mice Šilegov =

Macedonian handball player

Personal information
- Nationality: Macedonian
- Born: 19 June 1998 (age 28) Skopje, Macedonia
- Height: 1.75 m (5 ft 9 in)

Sport
- Sport: Handball
- Position: Right Wing
- Current club: HC Butel Skopje
- Number: 10

Senior clubs
- Years: Team
- 2015–2017: (North Macedonia) RK Metalurg II
- 2017–2021: (North Macedonia) RK Metalurg Skopje
- 2021–2022: (North Macedonia) GRK Ohrid
- 2022–2024: (North Macedonia) RK Golden Art
- 2024–2025: (North Macedonia) RK Tineks Prolet
- 2025–12/2025: (North Macedonia) RK Vardar Negotino
- 02/2026–: (North Macedonia) HC Butel Skopje

Mice Šilegov (Macedonian: Мице Шилегов) (born 19 June 1998) is a Macedonian handball player who plays for HC Butel Skopje.

He participated at the 2017 Men's Junior World Handball Championship.
