= Arnaud Bingo =

French handball player (born 1987)

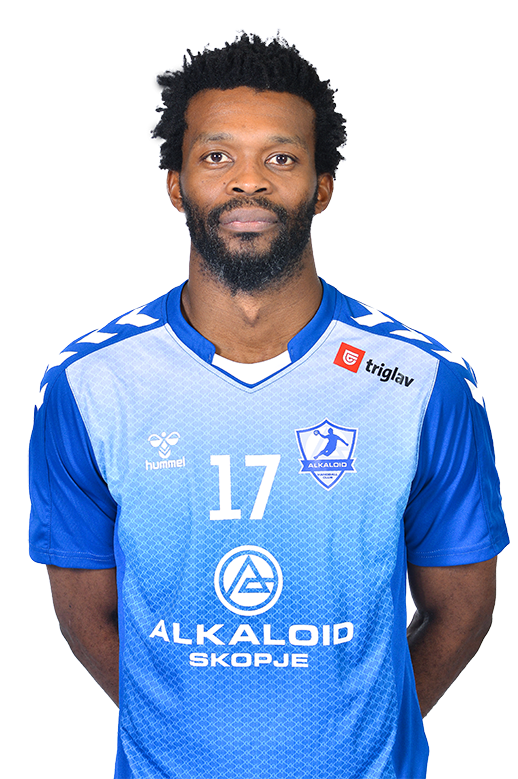
- Bingo in 2023

Personal information
- Nationality: French
- Born: 12 October 1987 (age 39) Lyon, France
- Height: 1.90 m (6 ft 3 in)

Sport
- Sport: Handball
- Position: Left wing
- Current club: Anorthosis Famagusta
- Number: 28

Senior clubs
- Years: Team
- 2005–2009: Villeurbanne
- 2009–2016: Tremblay-en-France
- 2016–2018: Montpellier Handball
- 2019–2021: Sporting CP
- 2021–2022: Tremblay-en-France
- 2022–2023: S.L. Benfica
- 2023–2025: RK Alkaloid
- 2025–: Anorthosis Famagusta
National team
Years	Team	Apps	(Gls)
2010–	France	31	(49)

Arnaud Bingo (born 12 October 1987) is a French handball player who plays for Anorthosis Famagusta.

His mother is Denise Ouabangui, 1996 Olympic sprinter for the Central African Republic. Arnaud said that continuing her mother's legacy running on the track wasn't for him because he doesn't like running for running's sake.

== Honours ==
- RK Alkaloid (North Macedonia)
- EHF European Cup

Winner (1): 2024-25
