= Sébastien Ostertag =

French handball player (born 1979)

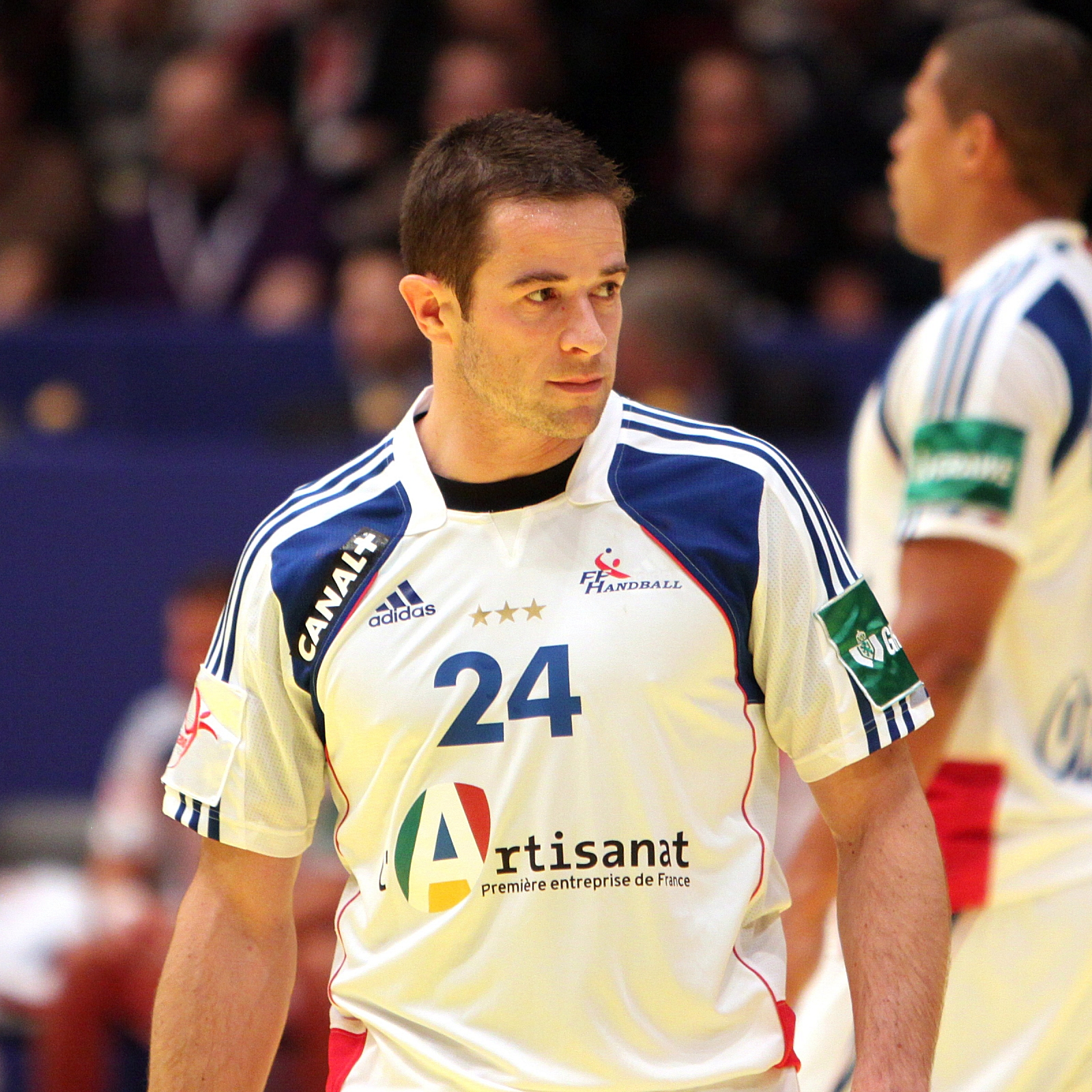

Personal information
- Nationality: French
- Born: 16 March 1979 (age 47) Paris, France
- Height: 173 cm (68 in)

Sport
- Sport: Handball
- Position: Left wing
- Current club: Retired

Youth career
- Years: Team
- 1985–1997: Livry-Gargan HB

Senior clubs
- Years: Team
- 1997–2000: Livry-Gargan HB
- 2000–2001: Athletic Club de Boulogne-Billancourt
- 2001–2005: Livry-Gargan HB
- 2005–2012: Tremblay-en-France Handball
- 2012–2015: Chartres MHB 28
National team
Years	Team	Apps	(Gls)
2005–2010	France	51	(113)
Medal record
Representing France
World Championship
Gold medal – first place	2009 Croatia	Team competition
European Championships
Bronze medal – third place	2008 Norway	Team competition
Gold medal – first place	2010 Austria	Team competition
- Updated on 3 September 2021

Sébastien Ostertag (born 16 March 1979 in Paris) is a French team handball player. He played on the France men's national handball team which won gold medals at the 2009 World Men's Handball Championship in Croatia and at the 2010 European Championship in Austria.

== Club career ==
Ostertag started his career at Livry-Gargan HB where he made his senior debut. With the club he was promoted to the Starligue in 1999.

After the team was relegated he joined Athletic Club de Boulogne-Billancourt for a season, before returning to Livry-Gargan HB. In 2003 he was once again promoted to the top french league. After another relegation in 2005 he joined Tremblay-en-France Handball, where he played until 2012.

From 2012 to 2015 he played for Chartres MBH 28 in the second tier. In 2018 he became the assistant coach at the club.
