= Marko Mitev =

Macedonian handball player

Personal information
- Nationality: Macedonian
- Born: 23 February 2003 (age 23) Skopje, Macedonia
- Height: 1.83 m (6 ft 0 in)

Sport
- Sport: Handball
- Position: Centre back
- Current club: RK Alkaloid
- Number: 10

Youth career
- Years: Team
- 2012–2018: RK Aerodrom

Senior clubs
- Years: Team
- 2018–2020: RK Aerodrom
- 2020–2023: HC Butel Skopje
- 2023–: RK Alkaloid
National team
- Years: Team
- 2022–: North Macedonia

Marko Mitev (born 23 February 2003) is a Macedonian handball player who plays for RK Alkaloid and the Macedonian national team.

== Early life and background ==
Born in Skopje, North Macedonia, Mitev began playing handball at a very young age. He started training at the age of 9 at RK Aerodrom under coach Darko Petrovski. He recalled that the team play, physical contact, and fighting spirit were the key factors that led him to choose handball.

== Club career ==
=== RK Aerodrom (2012–2020) ===
Mitev spent his formative years at RK Aerodrom, progressing through the youth system before being promoted to the senior team in 2018 at the age of 15. At Aerodrom, he played in the Macedonian Handball First League (second tier) and established himself as a promising young talent.

=== HC Butel Skopje (2020–2023) ===
In 2020, Mitev signed with HC Butel Skopje. During the 2020–21 season, he competed in the EHF European League with HC Butel Skopje. In addition, he was named the best young player of the half-season in the Macedonian Handball Super League in the same year.

=== RK Alkaloid (2023–present) ===
Mitev transferred to RK Alkaloid in a widely reported move in 2023. During the 2023/24 season, he recorded 32 goals in the EHF European League, and in the 2024/25 season he won his first European trophy by winning the EHF European Cup. In addition, Alkaloid clinched both the Macedonian Handball Cup and the Macedonian Handball Super Cup in 2024, with Mitev playing a crucial role in these triumphs.

== International career ==
Mitev represented Macedonia at all youth levels—including the under-16, under-18, and under-20 teams—before making his senior debut in 2022. During his cadet career, he reached the final of the 2021 Men's 19 EHF Championship B in Skopje, where he was recognized as the tournament's most useful player (MVP). At his first European Championship in 2022 with the senior national team, he scored his debut goal against the reigning world champion Denmark—a moment he described as immensely gratifying. Since then, he has represented the Macedonian Handball National Team in every major tournament. At the 2025 World Men's Handball Championship, he earned two Player of the Match awards— against Qatar and another against France.

== Honours ==
=== Club ===
==== RK Alkaloid ====
- Macedonian Handball Super League

Runner-up (1): 2022-23

- Macedonian Handball Cup

Winner (1): 2024

- Macedonian Handball Super Cup

Winner (1): 2024

- EHF European Cup

Winner (1): 2024-25

=== Individual ===
- Best Young Player of the Half-Season in the Macedonian Handball Super League: 2020–21 season.
- Most Valuable Player (MVP) of the 2021 European Men's U-19 Handball Championship B
- Player of the Match Awards – Two awards at the 2025 World Men's Handball Championship (against Qatar and France)

== Personal life ==
Marko Mitev is the older brother of handball player Damjan Mitev.
