= Ljubomir Savevski =

Macedonian handball player

Personal information
- Full name: Ljubomir Savevski
- Born: January 27, 1957 (age 69) Skopje, PR Macedonia, FPR Yugoslavia

Sport
- Sport: Handball

Teams managed
- Years: Team
- ?: RK Vardar
- ?: RK Pelister
- 2006–2008: Kometal Gjorče Petrov Skopje
- 2007–2008: North Macedonia (womes)
- 2009–2010: North Macedonia (men)
- 2010–2011: RK Vardar
- 2021–2022: RK Alkaloid
- 2022–2023: North Macedonia (women)
- Updated on 31 August 2009

Ljubomir Savevski (born 1 January 1957 in Skopje) is a Macedonian former handball player and a current head coach of the North Macedonia women's national handball team. He has coached Kometal Gjorče Petrov Skopje and the Macedonian national women's and men's teams.

== Achievements ==
- Kometal Gjorce Petrov
  - Macedonian League: 3
    - Winner: 2006, 2007, 2008
  - Macedonian Cup: 3
    - Winner: 2006, 2007, 2008
