= Regional Handball League =

Handball league in Southeast Europe

- Current season, competition or edition: 2026–27 Regional Handball League
- Sport: Handball
- Founded: 20 May 2026; 5 months ago
- No. of teams: 10
- Country: Montenegro; North Macedonia; Serbia
- Confederation: EHF
- Website: rr-liga.com

The Regional Handball League (abbr. RHL) is a regional handball league in Southeast Europe, featuring teams from Montenegro, North Macedonia, and Serbia.

The league was established in 2026, with its inaugural season played in a shortened format before transitioning to a full double round-robin system from the 2027–28 season.

== History ==
The league was founded on May 20, 2026, by the handball federations of Montenegro, North Macedonia, and Serbia, as a joint regional competition based on the defunct SEHA League.

== Team information ==
Location of teams in the 2026–27 season

Country	Team	City
Montenegro	Budvanska rivijera	Budva
Montenegro	Lovćen	Cetinje
North Macedonia	Alkaloid	Skopje
North Macedonia	Eurofarm Pelister	Bitola
North Macedonia	Ohrid	Ohrid
North Macedonia	Vardar 1961	Skopje
Serbia	Dinamo	Pančevo
Serbia	Dubočica 54	Leskovac
Serbia	Partizan	Belgrade
Serbia	Vojvodina	Novi Sad

== See also ==
- SEHA League
- ARKUS liga
- Macedonian Handball Super League
- Montenegrin Men's Handball First League
- Women's Regional Handball League
