= Ivan Džonov =

Macedonian handball player

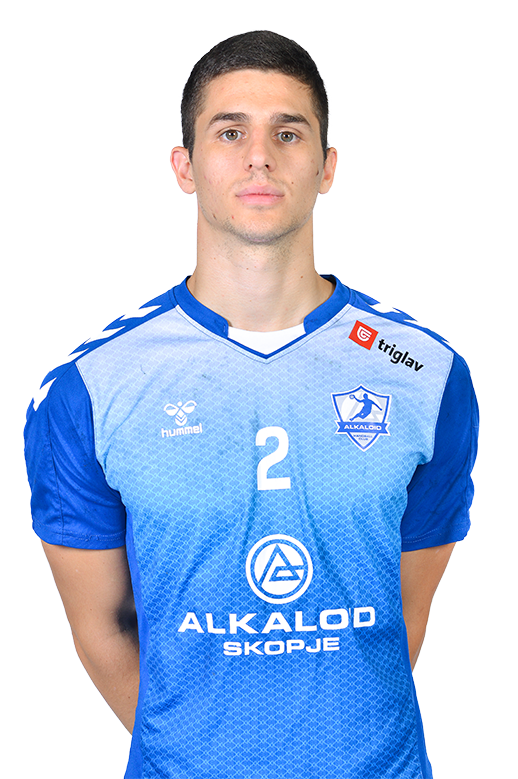

Personal information
- Nationality: Macedonian
- Born: 15 July 1997 (age 29) Skopje, Macedonia
- Height: 1.91 m (6 ft 3 in)

Sport
- Sport: Handball
- Position: Left Back
- Current club: RK Alkaloid
- Number: 2

Youth career
- Years: Team
- –: RK Metalurg Skopje
- –: RK Tineks Prolet

Senior clubs
- Years: Team
- 2015–2023: RK Tineks Prolet
- 2017–2018: → RK Partizan Gevgelija
- 2023–: RK Alkaloid
National team
| Years | Team | Apps | (Gls) |
| 2022- | Macedonia | 10 | (13) |
- Updated on 31. December 2023

Ivan Džonov (Macedonian: Иван Џонов) (born 15 July 1997) is a Macedonian handball player who plays for RK Alkaloid.

He participated at the 2017 Men's Junior World Handball Championship.

== Honours ==
- EHF European Cup

Winner (1): 2024-25
