= Nikola Markoski =

Macedonian handball player

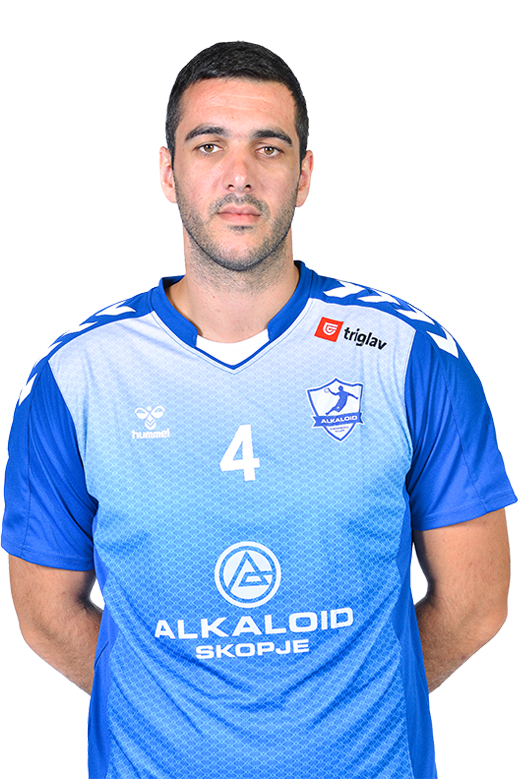

Personal information
- Nationality: Macedonian
- Born: 22 May 1990 (age 36) Struga, SFR Yugoslavia
- Height: 1.95 m (6 ft 5 in)

Sport
- Sport: Handball
- Position: Pivot
- Current club: RK Alkaloid

Senior clubs
- Years: Team
- 2007–2013: RK Vardar
- 2013–2015: RK Metalurg Skopje
- 2015: Zomimak M
- 2015–2016: HC Rabotnichki
- 2016–2018: Orosházi FKSE
- 2018–2022: RK Eurofarm Pelister
- 2022–2026: RK Alkaloid
National team
Years	Team	Apps	(Gls)
–	North Macedonia	73	(26)
- Updated on 2026

Nikola Markoski (born 22 May 1990) is a retired Macedonian handball player.

His brother Velko Markoski was also a handball player.

== Honors ==
- Macedonian Handball Super League

HC Vardar
Winner: 2009, 2013

- Macedonian Handball Cup

Winner: 2008, 2012

- SEHA League

Winner: 2012
HC Metalurg

- Champions (North Macedonia)

Gold : 2014

- Cup (North Macedonia)

Gold : 2013
HC Pelister

- Macedonian Super Cup (2)

1st: 2021 and 2022

RK Alkaloid

- Macedonian Handball Cup

Winner (1): 2024

- Macedonian Handball Super Cup

Winner (1): 2024

- EHF European Cup

Winner (1): 2024-25
