= Tremblay Handball =

French handball club

- Full name: Tremblay-en-France Handball
- Short name: TFHB
- Founded: 1972; 54 years ago
- Arena: Palais Des Sports, Tremblay-en-France
- Capacity: 1,020
- Head coach: Dragan Zovko
- League: LNH Division 1
- 2024–25: 10th of 16
- Club colours
Home	Away

Tremblay en France Handball is a handball club from Tremblay-en-France, France, that plays in the LNH Division 1.

Location of Tremblay-en-France Handball

== Crest, colours, supporters ==
=== Naming history ===
Name	Period
Tremblay Athletic Club	1972–2002
Tremblay-en-France Handball	2002–2021
Tremblay Handball	2021–present

=== Kits ===
HOME
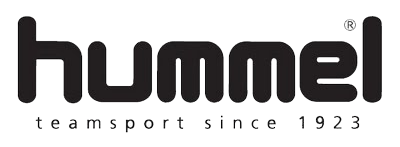
2020-

AWAY
2011-12	2020-

== Team ==
=== Current squad ===
Squad for the 2021–22 season

Tremblay Handball

Goalkeepers

- 1 (France) Cyril Dumoulin
- 95 (Guinea) Rubens Pierre

Left wingers

- 23 (France) Arnaud Bingo
- 34 (France) Étienne Mocquais

Right wingers

- 25 (France) Tahu Lufuanitu
- 64 (France) Jordan Camarero

Line players

- 7 (France) Mathieu Bataille
- 76 (France) Léo Naal
- 90 (Tunisia) Marouan Chouiref

Left Backs

- 3 (Cuba) Yosdany Rios
- 39 (Israel) Adir Cohen
- 75 (France) Fabien Ruiz

Centre Backs

- 6 (France) Allan Villeminot
- 10 (Slovenia) Marko Matijasevic
- 40 (Tunisia) Mohamed Soussi

Right Backs

- 18 (Poland) Michał Szyba
- 31 (France) Elyas Bouadjadja

=== Technical staff ===
- Head Coach: (Bosnia and Herzegovina) (France) Dragan Zovko

=== Transfers ===
Transfers for the 2026–27 season

Joining

- (France) Kevin Bonnefoi (GK) from (Switzerland) HC Kriens-Luzern
- (France) Wesley Pardin (GK) from (France) USAM Nîmes Gard
- (France) Reyhan Zuzo (CB) from (France) USAM Nîmes Gard
- (France) Timmy Petit (LP) from (Portugal) FC Porto
- (France) Théo Avelange-Demouge (RW) from (France) HBC Nantes
- (France) Kylian Prat (LB) from (France) Montpellier Handball
- (France) Gabriel Sculo (LW) from (France) Massy Essonne Handball

Leaving

- (Portugal) António Areia (RW) to (France) Caen Handball
- (Tunisia) Yassine Belkaïd (GK) to (Tunisia) Club Africain
- (Guinea) (France) Rubens Pierre (GK) to (Germany) HC Erlangen
- (Italy) (France) Jérémi Pirani (LW) to (France) Pontault-Combault Handball
- (France) Geoffroy Carabasse (LP) to (France) US Dunkerque HB
- (France) Mattéo Fadhuile (CB) to (North Macedonia) RK Vardar

=== Transfer History ===
Transfers for the 2025–26 season

Joining

- (Tunisia) Yassine Belkaïd (GK) from (Tunisia) Espérance Sportive de Tunis
- (Belgium) Raphael Kötters (RB) from (France) Istres Provence Handball
- (Denmark) Torben Petersen (LB) from (France) Istres Provence Handball
- (France) Geoffroy Carabasse (LP) from (France) Istres Provence Handball
- (France) Nicolas Nieto (LP) from (France) Limoges Handball

Leaving

- (Brazil) Uelington da Silva (LB) to (France) US Saintes Handball
- (Spain) David Iglesias Estévez (LB) to (France) US Créteil Handball
- (France) Rohnan Conte-Prat (LB) to (Italy) Handball Sassari
- (France) Erwan Modeste (LP) to (France) Union sportive de Saintes Handball
- (France) Tahu Lufuanitu (RW) to (France) Nancy Handball

== Previous squads ==
2010–2011 Team
Shirt No	Nationality	Player	Birth Date	Position
1	France	Robin Guillot	5 April 1989 (age 37)	Goalkeeper
2	France	Samuel Ugolin	28 December 1980 (age 45)	Right Winger
3	France	Jean-Philippe Pies	19 February 1991 (age 35)	Left Winger
4	France	Matthieu Drouhin	29 June 1981 (age 45)	Right Winger
6	France	Olivier Botesti	8 May 1990 (age 36)	Right Winger
7	France	Semir Zuzo	11 August 1976 (age 50)	Line Player
8	France	Teddy Poulin	9 February 1983 (age 43)	Left Back
9	France	Sébastien Ostertag	16 March 1979 (age 47)	Left Winger
10	Serbia	Rastko Stefanovič	9 February 1971 (age 55)	Central Back
11	Senegal	Ibrahima Sall	9 February 1978 (age 48)	Right Back
12	France	Sebastien Mias	21 October 1978 (age 47)	Goalkeeper
13	France	Teddy Prat	11 May 1974 (age 52)	Left Back
14	France	Romain Guillard	14 January 1986 (age 40)	Left Back
16	Serbia	Dragan Počuča	16 March 1974 (age 52)	Goalkeeper
17	France	Damien Waeghe	11 November 1984 (age 41)	Right Back
18	France	Macira Sacko	14 December 1985 (age 40)	Right Back
19	France	Sébastien Mongin	18 April 1978 (age 48)	Central Back
21	France	Benoit Peyrabout	22 July 1977 (age 49)	Line Player
23	France	Arnaud Bingo	12 October 1987 (age 38)	Left Winger

== Former club members ==
=== Notable former players ===
- (France) Patrice Annonay (2016–2021)
- (France) Arnaud Bingo (2007–2016, 2021-2022)
- (France) Sébastien Bosquet (2013–2015)
- (France) Samuel Honrubia (2016-2019)
- (France) Dika Mem (2015-2016)
- (France) Sébastien Mongin (2008–2012)
- (France) Sébastien Ostertag (2005-2012)
- (France) (Cameroon) Erwan Siakam-Kadji (2016-2021)
- (France) (Democratic Republic of the Congo) Audräy Tuzolana (2012–2016)
- (France) Semir Zuzo (2006-2011)
- (Algeria) Yacinn Bouakaz (2005–2010)
- (Algeria) Sassi Boultif (2017-2019)
- (Algeria) (France) Micke Brasseleur (2011–2015)
- (Algeria) Ahmed Hadjali (2005-2006)
- (Algeria) Salim Nedjel (2004-2005)
- (Brazil) Felipe Borges (2018-2020)
- (Croatia) Bruno Butorac (2019–2021)
- (Croatia) Luka Šebetić (2017–2021)
- (Democratic Republic of the Congo) Aurélien Tchitombi (2011–2013)
- (Hungary) Barna Putics (2014–2016)
- (North Macedonia) Petar Angelov (2005-2009)
- (Montenegro) Vasko Ševaljević (2017-2019)
- (Netherlands) Luc Steins (2017-2019)
- (Portugal) Pedro Portela (2018-2021)
- (Romania) Marius Sadoveac (2016–2018)
- (Russia) Alexander Pyshkin (2016–2017)
- (Slovenia) Uroš Bundalo (2014-2016)
- (Slovenia) Aljoša Rezar (2014-2016)
- (Spain) Juan del Arco (2019–2020)
- (Serbia) Mladen Bojinović (2015-2017)
- (Serbia) Dragan Počuča (2009-2013)
- (Serbia) Rastko Stefanovič (2005-2011)
- (Tunisia) Oussama Boughanmi (2013-2015)
- (Tunisia) Wissem Bousnina (2006-2010)
- (Tunisia) Marouan Chouiref (2013-2015, 2018-)
- (Tunisia) Makrem Missaoui (2005-2007)
- (Tunisia) Mohamed Soussi (2020-)
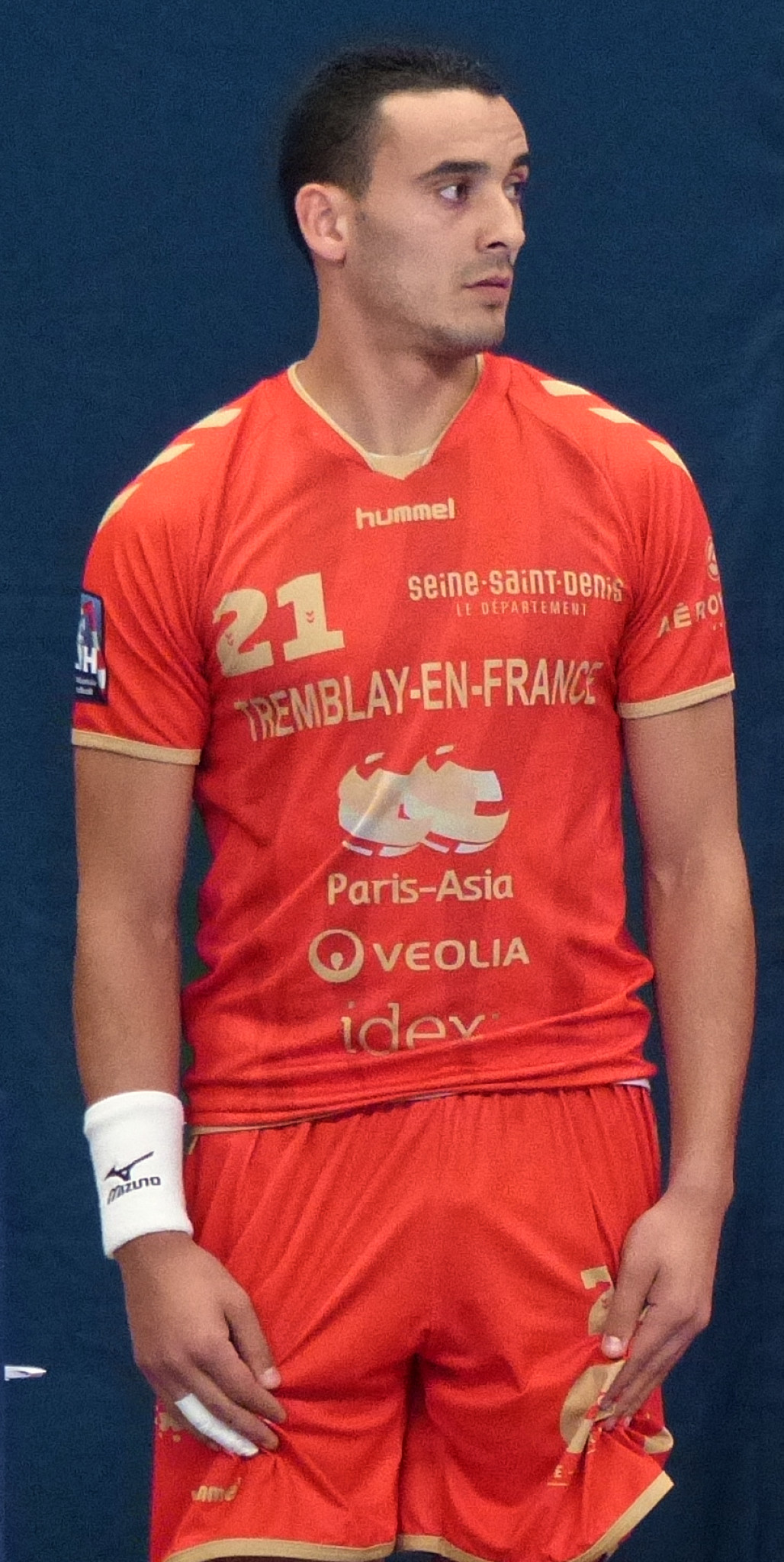
Oussama Boughanmi
(2014)

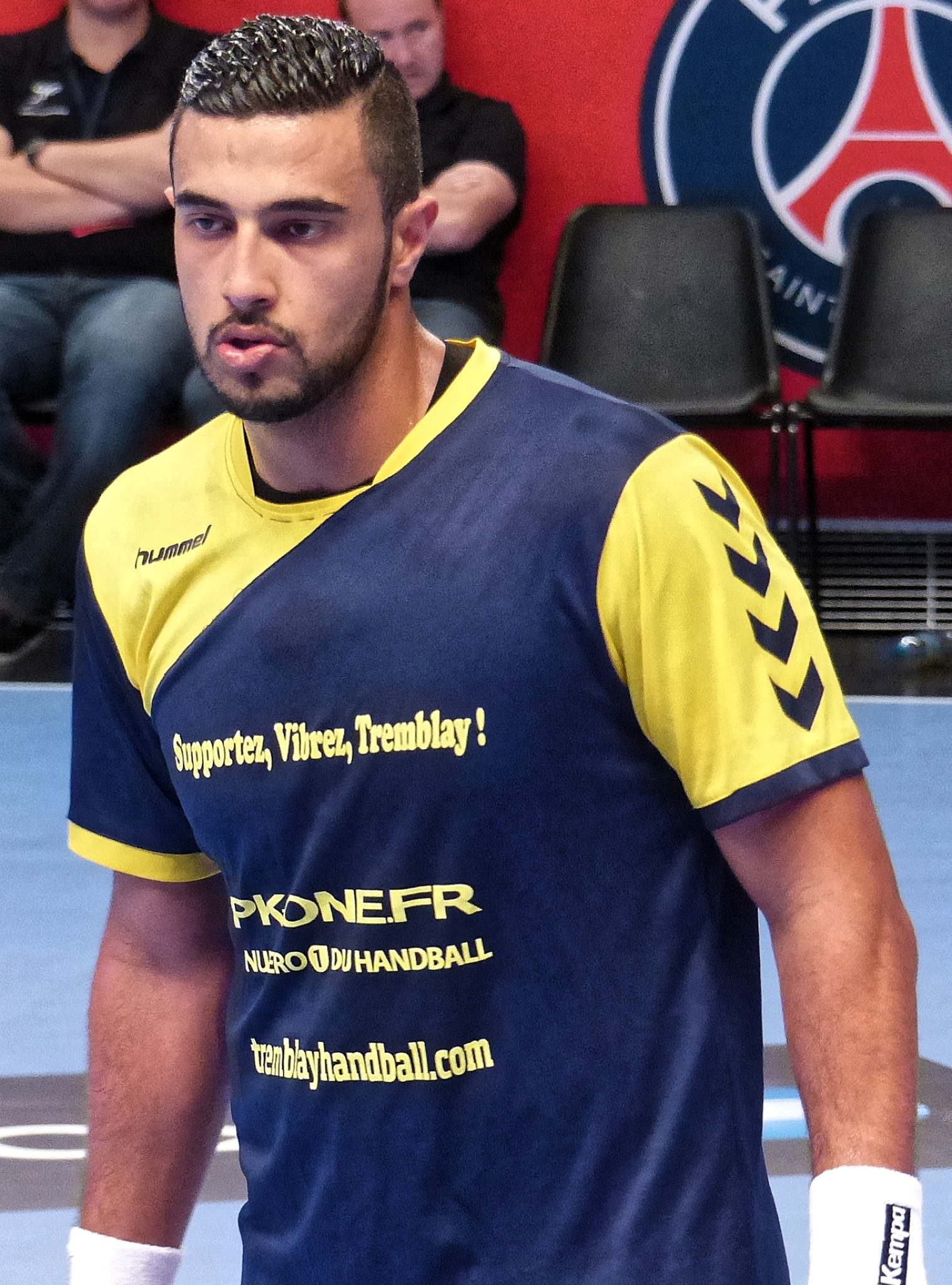
Marouan Chouiref
(2014)

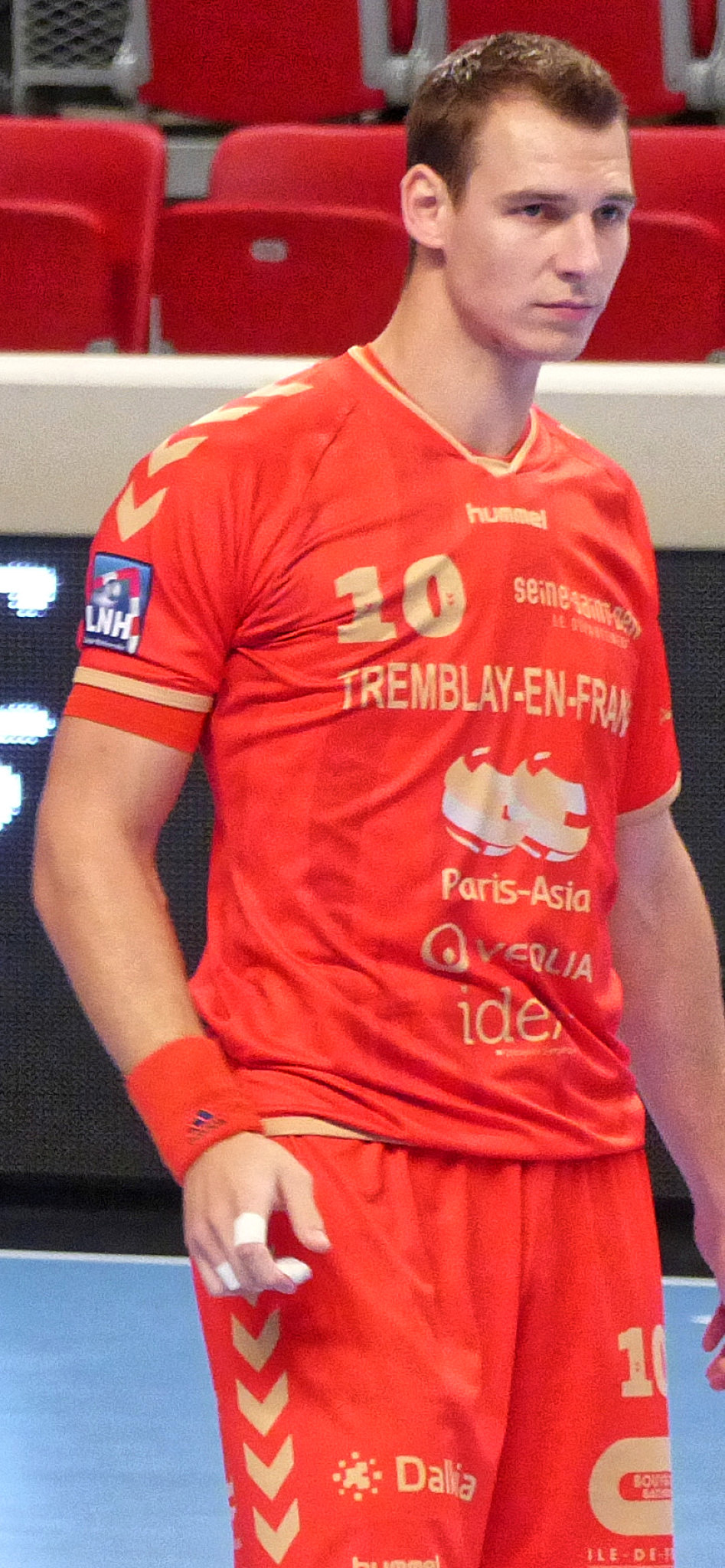
Barna Putics
(2014)

=== Former coaches ===
Seasons	Coach	Country
2003–2007	David Peneau	(France)
2007–2008	Thierry Perreux	(France)
2008–2013	Stéphane Imbratta	(France)
2013–2014	Dragan Zovko	(Bosnia and Herzegovina) (France)
2014-2017	David Christmann	(France)
2017–2019	Benjamin Braux	(France)
2019–2020	Rastko Stefanovič	(Serbia)
2020	Stéphane Imbratta	(France)
2020–2021	Joël da Silva	(France)
2021–	Dragan Zovko	(Bosnia and Herzegovina) (France)
