= CS Minaur Baia Mare =

Romanian sports society

- Full name: Club Sportiv Minaur Baia Mare
- Nicknames: Băimărenii (The People from Baia Mare)
- Founded: 1974; 52 years ago 2015; 11 years ago (refounded)
- Colours: Black, White, Orange
- Chairman: Raluca Mureșan
- Website: Official website

Club Sportiv Minaur Baia Mare, commonly known as CS Minaur Baia Mare, Minaur Baia Mare or simply as Minaur, is a Romanian sports society from Baia Mare, Romania, founded in 1974 by Lascăr Pană, after he took over the old entity (Minerul) in 1970. The club went bankrupt during early 2010s and was re-founded in 2015.

== History ==
On 15 May 1974, Lascăr Pană founded Handbal Club Minaur Baia Mare as Romania's first sports club dedicated to handball. The club's name, Minaur, is derived from the Romanian expression mina de aur ("gold mine"), referring to the mining of the Maramureș region. Minaur adopted orange and black as its club colours.

Minaur became one of Romania's most successful men's handball clubs, winning Romanian Cup in the 1977–78 season before achieving success in European competitions. Minaur reached the semi-finals of the EHF Cup Winners' Cup in the 1978–79 and 1980–81 seasons. The club won the IHF Cup (now the EHF European League) in 1984–85 after defeating ZTR Zaporizhzhia in the final, and won the competition again in 1987–88 against Granitas Kaunas. Domestically, Minaur won consecutive Romanian league championships in 1997–98 and 1998–99.

Financial difficulties during the early 2010s resulted in the club entering bankruptcy proceedings. In 2015, the Baia Mare Local Council reestablished Club Sportiv Minaur Baia Mare as a municipal multi-sport club. Initially comprising men's and women's handball sections, the club later added a football department. As of 2026, club operates men's handball, women's handball, and football sections and is funded by the local municipality.

== Men's Handball section ==
The men's handball section of Minaur is one of the most prestigious and respected handball teams in Romania. Founded in 1974 by Lascăr Pană, men's handball section was the first one of the sports society and over the years won three Romanian Leagues, was ranked second on seven occasions and was on the podium in no less than 17 times. The boys from Minaur also won six Romanian Cups and two EHF Cups.

== Women's Handball section ==
The women's handball section is part of Minaur only since 2015, year when the club was re-founded after its bankruptcy. The women's handball section was in fact founded on the basis of HCM Baia Mare, club that also went bankrupt in 2016. HCM was one of the oldest sport clubs in Baia Mare, with a tradition that started in 1960, one Romanian League title, 3 Romanian Cups, 3 Romanian Supercups and with notable results in the Women's EHF Champions League, Women's EHF European Cup and Women's EHF Cup Winners' Cup.

== Football section ==
The football section of Minaur is the newest one, added in the sports society organizational chart only in 2017. Football team of Baia Mare was founded in 1948 as CSM Baia Mare and was for most of its existence a second league member. The most glorious period of "the miners" was at the end of the 1970s, under the command of Viorel Mateianu, at that time they qualified in the UEFA Cup Winners' Cup and played against Real Madrid. In recent years, the football club went bankrupt on two occasions, so after the last one, it went under the umbrella of Minaur.
