= Matic Suholežnik =

Slovene handball player (born 1995)

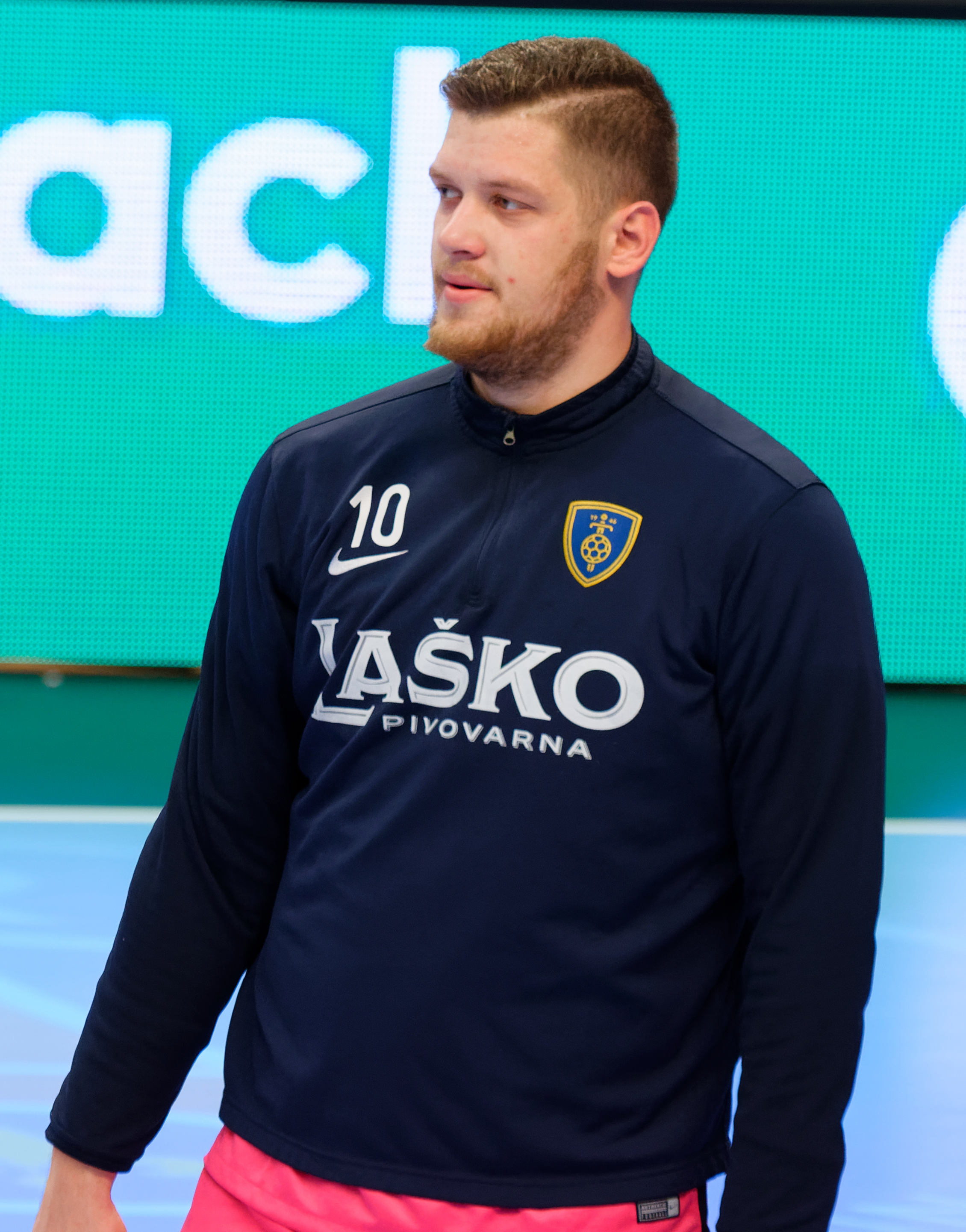

Personal information
- Nationality: Slovenian
- Born: 2 May 1995 (age 31) Celje, Slovenia
- Height: 2.02 m (6 ft 8 in)

Sport
- Sport: Handball
- Position: Pivot
- Current club: RK Alkaloid
- Number: 4

Senior clubs
- Years: Team
- –2018: RK Celje
- 2018–2020: Dunkerque HGL
- 2020–2021: S.L. Benfica
- 2021–2023: RK Celje
- 2023: Sepahan S.C.
- 2023–2024: RK Zagreb
- 2024–2025: Saran Loiret Handball
- 2025–2026: RD Slovan
- 2026–: RK Alkaloid
National team
Years	Team	Apps	(Gls)
2018–	Slovenia	74	(52)
- Updated on 24 January 2026

Matic Suholežnik (born 2 May 1995) is a Slovenian handball player who plays for RK Alkaloid and the Slovenia national team.

He represented Slovenia at the 2018 European Men's Handball Championship.
