= RK Alkaloid =

Handball club from Skopje, Macedonia

Handball Club Alkaloid
- Full name: Rakometen klub Alkaloid
- Short name: Alkaloid
- Founded: 7 July 2021; 5 years ago
- Arena: Avtokomanda Sports Hall; Boris Trajkovski Sports Center
- Capacity: 2,000; 6,500
- President: Goran Minov
- Head coach: Kiril Lazarov
- Captain: Igor Gjorgjiev
- League: Macedonian Super League; Regional League
- 2025–26: Macedonian Super League, 4th
- Club colours
Home	Away

RK Alkaloid (Macedonian: РК Алкалоид) is a Macedonian professional team handball club from Skopje that plays in the Macedonian Super League and the Regional League.

Location of RK Alkaloid

== History ==
The club was founded on 7 July 2021 and started competing in the second tier of Macedonian handball. The Alkaloid company owns 100% of the club. RK Alkaloid managed to win the league title in their first season, securing a place in the Macedonian Handball Super League for 2022–23. They finished 2nd in the 2022-23 Macedonian Handball Super League season and they competed in the EHF European League group stage for the first time in the season 2023-24. In 2024 Alkaloid won the domestic cup for the first time, followed by the Supercup of Macedonia title. After beating AEK H.C., Alkaloid became the third Macedonian handball club with a European trophy and the first one to win the EHF European Cup. Kiril Lazarov became the first Macedonian to win a European trophy both as a player and a coach.

== Home ground ==
Avtokomanda Hall the indoor sports arena located in Skopje, Avtokomanda.

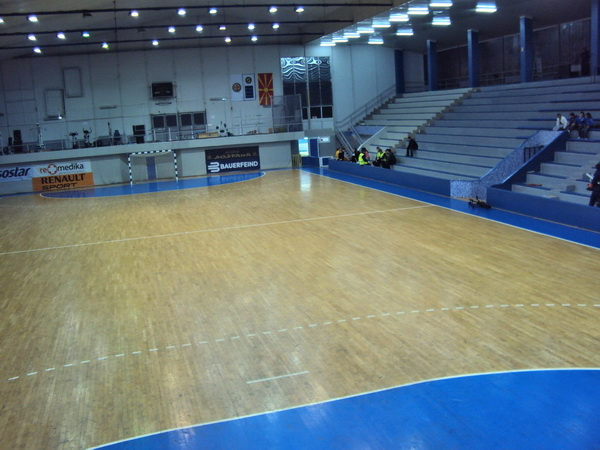

== Crest, colours, supporters ==
=== Kit manufacturers ===
Period	Kit manufacturer
2021–present	(Denmark) Hummel

=== Kits ===
HOME
2021–22	2022–23	2023–24

AWAY
2021–22	2022–23	2023–24

== Accomplishments ==
=== Domestic competitions ===
- Macedonian Handball Cup

Winner (1): 2024

- Macedonian Handball Super Cup

Winner (1): 2024

=== European Competitions ===
- EHF European Cup

Winner (1): 2024-25

== European record ==
=== EHF European League ===
Season	Round	Club	Home	Away	Aggregate
2023–24	Group Stage (Group F)	(Serbia) RK Vojvodina	26–31	29–34	3rd place
2023–24	Group Stage (Group F)	(Spain) Logroño La Rioja	28–27	29–29	3rd place
2023–24	Group Stage (Group F)	(Denmark) Bjerringbro-Silkeborg	23–31	31–35	3rd place
2025–26	Qualification round	(Germany) TSV Hannover-Burgdorf	28–29	27–37	55–66

=== EHF European Cup ===
Season	Round	Club	Home	Away	Aggregate
2024–25; Winners	Round 2	(Lithuania) Dragūnas Klaipėda	42–31	37–31	79–62
2024–25; Winners	Round 3	(Austria) Handball Westwien	38–27	32–29	70–56
2024–25; Winners	Last 16	(Italy) SSV Brixen Handball	38–31	44–22	82–63
2024–25; Winners	Quarterfinals	(Romania) CS Minaur Baia Mare	32–25	31–31	63–56
2024–25; Winners	Semifinals	(Norway) Runar Sandefjord	42–37	29–34	71–71 (3–1 p)
2024–25; Winners	Final	(Greece) AEK Athens HC	10–0 (Note: Due to security concerns in the arena, the final was cancelled. On 5 June 2025, the EHF decided that HC Alkaloid would be given a 10–0 forfeit win and declared them the champions, because AEK refused to play)	29–25	39–25
2026–27	Round 2	(Austria) SC Kelag Ferlach	31–22	32–18	63–40
2026–27	Round 2	(Slovenia) RK Gorenje Velenje	–	–	–

=== EHF ranking ===
As of 10/22/2026

Rank	Team	Points
44	(Serbia) Vojvodina Novi Sad	108
45	(Norway) Runar Sandefjord	106
46	(France) Fenix Toulouse	95
47	(North Macedonia) RK Alkaloid	94
48	(Finland) BK-46	93
49	(Turkey) Beşiktaş JK	89
50	(Slovenia) RK Gorenje Velenje	89

== Management ==
Position	Name
President	(North Macedonia) Goran Minov
Sport Director	(North Macedonia) Ljubomir Savevski
Operations Director	(North Macedonia) Miloš Miloševski

== Current squad ==
Squad for the 2026–2027 season

Goalkeepers

- 1 (North Macedonia) Marko Kizikj
- 12 (North Macedonia) Ivan Galevski
- 16 (North Macedonia) Gjorgji Nikolovski

Left wingers

- 2 (North Macedonia) Ivan Djonov
- 3 (Iceland) Úlfar Páll Monsi Þórðarson

Right wingers

- 5 (North Macedonia) Nikola Kosteski
- 18 (North Macedonia) Nenad Kosteski
- 19 (North Macedonia) Aleksandar Petkovski

Line players

- 4 (Slovenia) Matic Suholežnik
- 8 (North Macedonia) Valentin Karasmanakis
- 9 (North Macedonia) Marko Stojkovikj
- 23 (North Macedonia) Mihail Alarov

Left Backs

- 21 (Serbia) Uroš Borzaš
- 25 (North Macedonia) Emilijan Gjorgovski
- 87 (Montenegro) Vuko Borozan

Central backs

- 10 (North Macedonia) Marko Mitev
- 11 (North Macedonia) Igor Gjorgjiev (c)
- 20 (North Macedonia) Damjan Mitev

Right backs

- 13 (North Macedonia) Martin Velkovski
- 17 (Slovenia) Nejc Cehte
- 24 (North Macedonia) Filip Nikolov

=== Transfers ===
Transfers for the 2026–27 season

Joining

- (Montenegro) Vuko Borozan (LB) from (North Macedonia) GRK Ohrid
- (Slovenia) Nejc Cehte (RB) from (Germany) Füchse Berlin
- (Slovenia) Matic Suholežnik (LP) from (Slovenia) RD Slovan
- (North Macedonia) Dimitar Uzunchev (RB) back from loan at (North Macedonia) HC Butel Skopje

Leaving

- (North Macedonia) Martin Ivanovski (CB) to (North Macedonia) GRK Ohrid
- (North Macedonia) Dimitar Uzunchev (RB) to (Slovenia) RK Celje
- (North Macedonia) Kristijan Simonoski (LP) to (North Macedonia) RK Eurofarm Pelister 2
- (North Macedonia) David Trajkovski (LW) (to (North Macedonia) RK Multi Essence)
- (North Macedonia) Nikola Markoski (P) (retires)

=== Transfer history ===
Transfers for the 2025–26 season

Joining

- (North Macedonia) Gjorgji Nikolovski (GK) (from (North Macedonia) RK Multi Essens)
- (Iceland) Úlfar Páll Monsi Þórðarson (LW) from (Iceland) Valur
- (North Macedonia) David Trajkoski (LW) (from (North Macedonia) RK Prilep 2010)
- (Serbia) Uroš Borzaš (LB) from (North Macedonia) RK Eurofarm Pelister
- (North Macedonia) Emilijan Gjorgovski (LB) from (North Macedonia) RK Eurofarm Pelister
- (North Macedonia) Mihail Ivanoski (RB) back from loan at (Serbia) RK Dubočica 54
- (North Macedonia) Filip Nikolov (RB) (from (North Macedonia) HC Butel Skopje)
- (North Macedonia) Nenad Kosteski (RW) from (North Macedonia) RK Eurofarm Pelister
- (North Macedonia) Mihail Alarov (LP) from (North Macedonia) RK Vardar

Leaving

- (North Macedonia) Blagojče Trajkovski (GK) to (North Macedonia) HC Butel Skopje
- (France) Arnaud Bingo (LW) to (Cyprus) Anorthosis Famagusta
- (North Macedonia) Mihajlo Mladenović (LB) to (France) US Créteil Handball
- (Portugal) Francisco Oliveira Silva (LB) to (South Korea) SK Hawks
- (North Macedonia) David Savrevski (RB) to (North Macedonia) GRK Ohrid
- (North Macedonia) Mihail Ivanoski (RB) to (Slovenia) RK Ajdovščina
- (North Macedonia) Martin Serafimov (RB) (free agent)
- (North Macedonia) Kostadin Petrov (LP) to (North Macedonia) RK Multi Essence
- (North Macedonia) Dimitar Uzunchev (RB) on loan at (North Macedonia) HC Butel Skopje

=== Technical staff ===
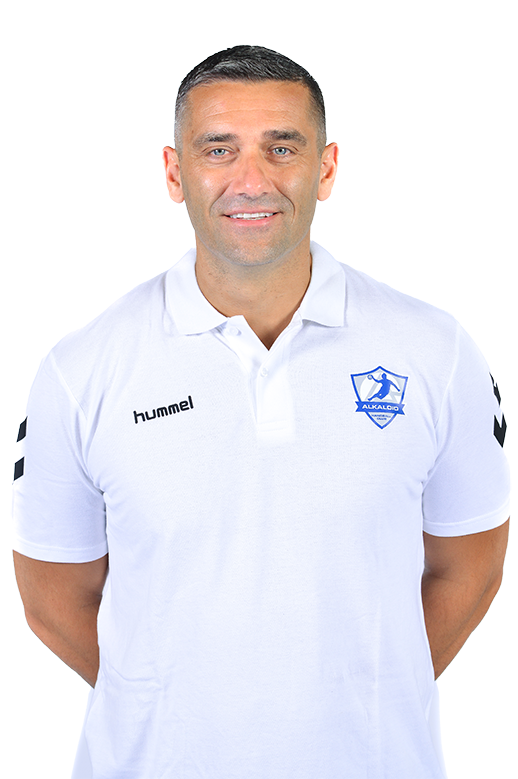
Head Coach Kiril Lazarov

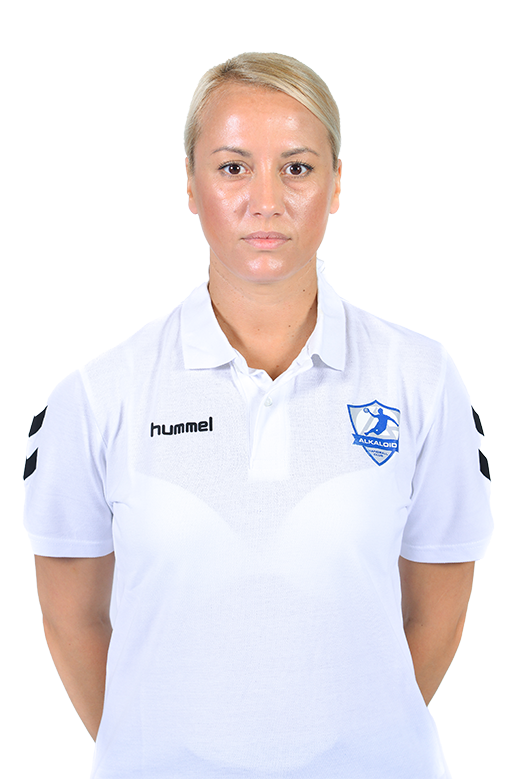
Assistant Coach Biljana Crvenkoska

- Head coach: (North Macedonia) Kiril Lazarov
- Assistant coach: (North Macedonia) Biljana Crvenkoska
- Goalkeeping coach: (North Macedonia) Jane Cvetkovski
- Fitness coach: (North Macedonia) Petar Basnarkov
- Physiotherapist: (North Macedonia) Toše Ristovski & (North Macedonia) Toše Trajkovski

== Former club members ==
=== Notable former players ===
- (North Macedonia) Jane Cvetkovski
- (North Macedonia) Blagojče Trajkovski
- (Cuba) Alejandro Romero
- (France) Arnaud Bingo
- (Portugal) Francisco Oliveira Silva

=== Former coaches ===
Seasons	Coach	Country
2021–2022	Ljubomir Savevski	(North Macedonia)
2022–	Kiril Lazarov	(North Macedonia)
