= HC Butel Skopje =

Handball club based in Skopje Macedonia

(North Macedonia) Butel Skopje
- Full name: Butel Skopje
- Founded: August 2017; 9 years ago
- Arena: Andon Dimitrovski
- Capacity: 500
- Head coach: Stojanče Stoilov
- League: Macedonian Super League
- Club colours
Home	Away

HC Butel Handball is a men's professional handball club based in Skopje, Macedonia. It competes in the Macedonian top flight Super League.

== Crest, colours, supporters ==
=== Kits ===
HOME
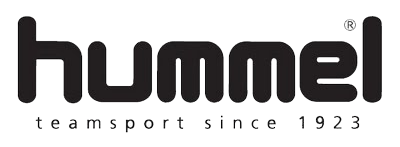
2022–23

AWAY
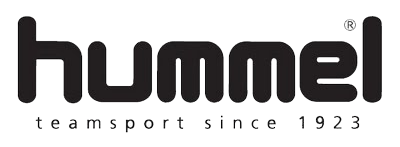
2022–23

== History ==
The club is established in August 2017. In their debut they've won the league 1 which is second rank division and they qualified for the Super league competition. In the season 2018/19 they've finished 4th and managed to qualify for the EHF Cup competition for the first time. HC Butel Skopje reached the round 2 in the debut for EHF competition .

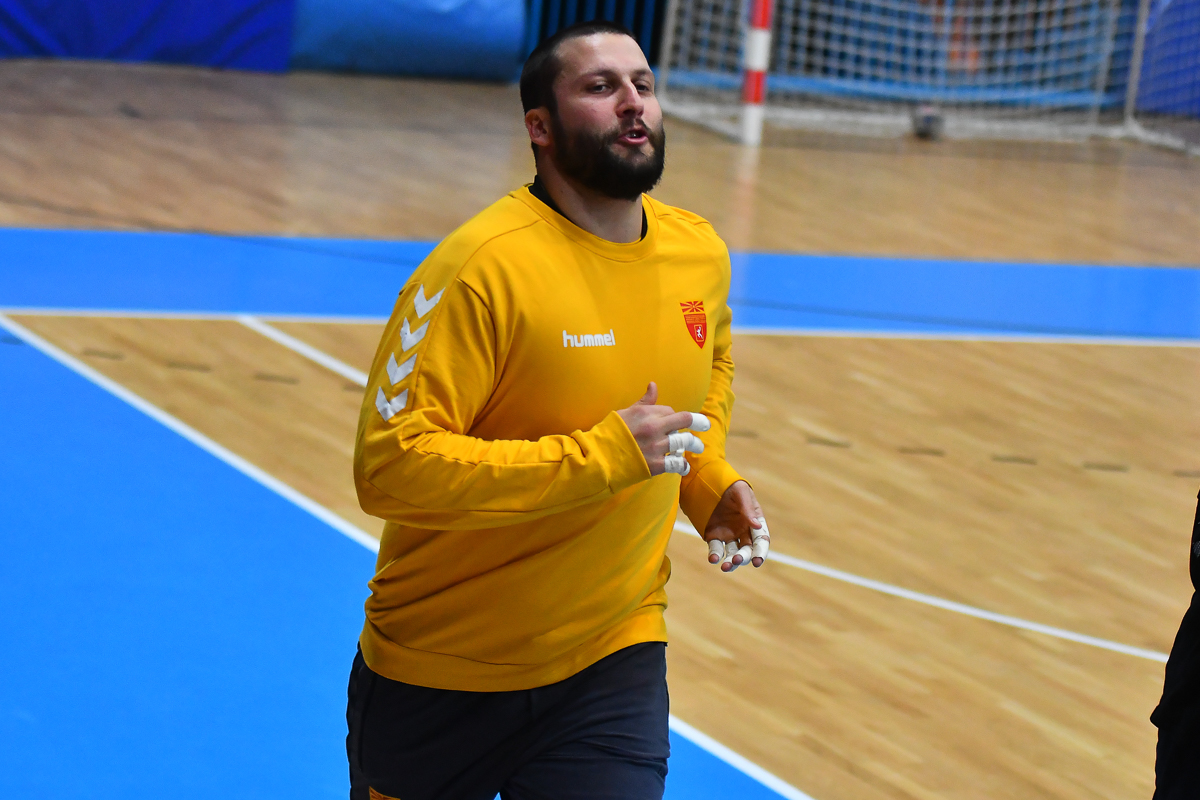
HC Butels Coach Stoilov

== European record (European Union) ==
In the season 2018/19 they've finished 4th and managed to qualify for the EHF Cup competition for the first time. HC Butel Skopje reached the round 2 in the debut for EHF competition.There they faced Ukrainian Side ZTR Zaporizhzhia in a two legged qualification round, where the first leg was a draw while the second leg HC Butel Skopje fell short and lost on aggregate do to away goals.In the season 2019-20 Butel again had a good season in the Macedonian Handball Super League finishing in the fourth (4th) position and qualifying for the qualification round of the 2020-21 EHF European League where they faced Hungarian side Gyöngyösi in a two legged qualification round. Butel lost the first leg by a rough 34-21, in the second leg they fought a tough battle where they got the win 25-24 but it wasn't enough to go to the next round losing 46–58 on aggregate.In the 2021–22 season Butel finished in again the fourth (4th) position again qualifying for the qualification round of the EHF European League.This time their opponent was Austrian side Alpla Hard, sadly Butel fell short in both legs losing 55–56 on aggregate, the first leg being 21–25 at home, while the second leg 26–21 in the second leg away.In the 2024–25 season saw Butel finish in the sixth (6th) position in the Macedonian Handball Super League which means they qualified for the first of the 2025-26 where they faced Luxembourg side HB Dudelange. Butel won the first leg 27-31 a good win for the side looking to qualify to the next round for the first time, sadly in the second leg Butel had control of the game and score until the final minutes where HB Dudelange found a way back to win by a score of 24–29 completing the comeback of -4 goals to eliminate Butel

=== EHF Cup ===
Season	Round	Club	Home	Away	Aggregate
2019-20	R2	(Ukraine) ZTR Zaporizhzhia	18–14	29–24	43-42

=== EHF European League ===
Season	Round	Club	Home	Away	Aggregate
2020–21	Qualification round	(Hungary) Gyöngyösi	25–24	34–21	46–58
2022–23	Qualification round 2	(Austria) Alpla Hard	21–25	26–21	42–51

=== EHF European Cup ===
Season	Round	Club	Home	Away	Aggregate
2025–26	Round 1	(Luxembourg) HB Dudelange	24–29	27–31	55–56
2026–27	Round 2	(Croatia) HRK Gorica	25–24	24–27	49–51

== Team ==
=== Current squad ===
Squad for the 2026–2027 season

Goalkeepers

- 1 (North Macedonia) Marko Bogdanovski
- 12 (North Macedonia) Atanasij Trsunov
- 32 (North Macedonia) Gradimir Chanevski

Left Wingers

- 3 (North Macedonia) Damjan Subashevski
- 26 (North Macedonia) Marko Kaevski
- (North Macedonia) David Avramovski
- (North Macedonia) Toma Simonovski

Right Wingers

- 17 (North Macedonia) Bojan Spasovski
- 18 (North Macedonia) Luka Jovikj
- 69 (North Macedonia) Stefan Zengovski

Line players

- 6 (North Macedonia) Matej Markovski
- 42 (North Macedonia) Dejan Mihajlovikj
- 9 (North Macedonia) Gjorgji Leshnikovski

Left Backs

- 7 (North Macedonia) Andrej Gjorgjeski
- 71 (North Macedonia) Petar Nikoloski
- 77 (North Macedonia) Teodor Todeski

Central Backs

- 4 (North Macedonia) Luka Langoski
- 8 (North Macedonia) Dimitar Gjorgievski
- 11 (North Macedonia) David Janevski
- 13 (North Macedonia) Trajce Kostov
- 45 (North Macedonia) Arhangel Trsunov

Right Backs

- 10 (North Macedonia) Kristijan Stamenkovikj
- 14 (North Macedonia) Martin Petrovski
- (North Macedonia) Todor Aksentiev
- (North Macedonia) Dimitar Simovski

=== Transfers ===
Transfers for the 2026–27 season

Joining

- (North Macedonia) Kristijan Stamenković (RB) from (North Macedonia) RK Vardar
- (North Macedonia) Marko Bogdanovski (GK) from (North Macedonia) RK Vardar
- (North Macedonia) Gradimir Chanevski (GK) (free agent)
- (North Macedonia) Toma Simonovski (LW) (from (North Macedonia) RK Multi Essence)
- (North Macedonia) David Avramovski (LW) (from (North Macedonia) RK Aerodrom)
- (North Macedonia) Andrej Gjorgjeski (LB) (from (North Macedonia) RK Alkaloid)
- (North Macedonia) Trajce Kostov (CB) (from (North Macedonia) RK Prolet 62)
- (North Macedonia) Todor Aksentiev (RB) (from (North Macedonia) RK Multi Essence)
- (North Macedonia) Dimitar Simovski (RB) (from (North Macedonia) RK Multi Essence)
- (North Macedonia) Luka Jovikj (RW) (from (North Macedonia) RK Prolet 62)
- (North Macedonia) Gjorgji Leshnikovski (P) (from (North Macedonia) RK Alkaloid)

Leaving

- (North Macedonia) Blagojche Trajkovski (GK) to (North Macedonia) RK Prilep 2010
- (North Macedonia) Matej Novakovski (LP) to (North Macedonia) MRK Kumanovo
- (North Macedonia) Dimitar Uzunchev (RB) loan back to (North Macedonia) RK Alkaloid
- (North Macedonia) Aleksandar Stojanoski (GK) (to (Germany) HSV Apolda)
- (North Macedonia) Dario Vasileski (GK) (to ?)
- (North Macedonia) Todor Uzunchev (LB) (to (North Macedonia) RK Mladost 1977)
- (North Macedonia) Hristijan Gjurmeshevikj (LB) (to (North Macedonia) RK Multi Essence)
- (North Macedonia) Leonid Kiselovski (CB) (to ?)
- (North Macedonia) Mice Šilegov (RW) (to (North Macedonia) RK Struga)

=== Transfer History ===
Transfers for the 2025–26 season

Joining

- (North Macedonia) Blagojče Trajkovski (GK) from (North Macedonia) RK Alkaloid
- (North Macedonia) Dimitar Uzunchev (RB) on loan from (North Macedonia) RK Alkaloid

Leaving

- (North Macedonia) Bojan Blažeski (GK) to (North Macedonia) GRK Ohrid

=== Technical staff ===
- Head coach: (North Macedonia) Stojanče Stoilov
