= Paris Saint-Germain Handball =

French professional handball club

Paris Saint-Germain
- Full name: Paris Saint-Germain Handball
- Short name: PSG Handball
- Founded: 1941; 85 years ago
- Arena: Stade Pierre de Coubertin
- Capacity: 4,016
- President: Nasser Al-Khelaifi
- Head coach: Stefan Madsen
- Captain: Luka Karabatic
- League: LNH Division 1
- 2025–26: 1st of 16 (champions)
- Club colours
Home	Away

Paris Saint-Germain Handball, commonly known as PSG Handball, is a French professional handball club based in Paris, France. It operates as the handball department of Paris Saint-Germain FC. Founded in 1941, the club currently competes in the top tier of French handball, the LNH Division 1. Originally established as Patriotes d'Asnières, the club underwent several name changes and relocations before becoming part of Paris Saint-Germain ahead of the 1992–93 season. Following a period of decline and separation from PSG in 2002, the club was rebranded as Paris Handball and later entered a new era after being acquired by Qatar Sports Investments (QSI) in 2012, adopting its current name.

The club's history has been marked by steady development and several pivotal turning points. After experiencing both successes and setbacks in the mid-20th century, PSG Handball rose to prominence during the 1990s under the PSG banner. However, the early 2000s saw the club suffer relegation and financial difficulties. The post-2002 period involved a gradual rebuilding process, with Paris Handball stabilising independently and achieving consistent domestic performances, laying the foundations for its resurgence prior to the QSI takeover.

Since 2012, PSG Handball have established themselves as the dominant force in French handball. The club have won twelve LNH Division 1 titles, six Coupe de France, three Coupe de la Ligue, and a record five Trophée des Champions. PSG have also claimed two LNH Division 2 championships earlier in their history. On the international stage, the club have become regular contenders, reaching the EHF Champions League final in the 2016–17 season and the IHF Men's Super Globe final in 2016, finishing runners-up in both competitions.

PSG Handball have played their home matches at the Stade Pierre de Coubertin, which has also served as the club's training ground since 1992. The club previously hosted its European fixtures at the Halle Georges Carpentier until 2016, when Coubertin underwent renovation and refurbishment work to comply with European Handball Federation (EHF) regulatory standards for international competitions. PSG also operate a structured academy system, including a U18 team and a reserve side. The reserve team has won one Pré-nationale title, two Nationale 3 titles, and one Nationale 2 title, while the U18s have lifted both the Championnat de France U18 and Challenge de France once. As part of the club's long-term development strategy, the handball section is expected to relocate its training and academy operations to Campus PSG in 2028.

== History ==
=== Asnières origins and relocation to Paris ===
The Parisian club was founded in 1941 as Patriotes d'Asnières and adopted the name Asnières Sports one year later. In 1945, the team reached the final of the Coupe de France, losing to Villemomble at the Parc des Princes in front of an estimated crowd of 15,000 spectators. At the time, handball was played in an eleven-a-side format. Asnières Sports was chaired by Christian Picard, who was succeeded by his son Gérard Picard during the 1975–76 season; Gérard Picard remained president until 2003.

In 1985, the club partnered with Racing Club de France and competed under the name Asnières Racing Olympique 92 until 1987. During the 1985–86 season, the team achieved promotion to LNH Division 1 for the first time in its history after reaching the LNH Division 2 final, where it was defeated by Villefranche. Following this success, the club's leadership persuaded the Council of Paris to join forces with the municipality of Asnières-sur-Seine to establish a major handball club in the capital. The Hauts-de-Seine-based team subsequently relocated to Paris and was renamed Paris-Racing-Asnières in 1987, before adopting the name Paris-Asnières Handball in 1989.

Several future international players featured for the club during this period, including Jackson Richardson and Patrick Cazal. Richardson spent two seasons with Paris between 1989 and 1991, while Cazal signed his first professional contract with the club in 1989. Under the management of Yann Blanchard, Richardson and Cazal, along with league top scorer Júlíus Jónasson, helped Paris-Asnières win their first trophy in 1990, claiming the Division 2 title after defeating Sélestat in the final and securing promotion to the top flight.

=== PSG takeover and OM Vitrolles rivalry ===
On 7 July 1992, Paris Saint-Germain FC and its owners Canal+ took over the professional team and reserve squad of Paris-Asnières. Led by Charles Biétry, PSG's multisport project also included active sections in judo, volleyball, rugby league, boxing, and basketball. This development led to a further change of name, as Paris-Asnières became PSG-Asnières. The partnership lasted ten years. Chaired by Gérard Picard, the club played its home matches at the Stade Pierre de Coubertin and the Halle Georges Carpentier.

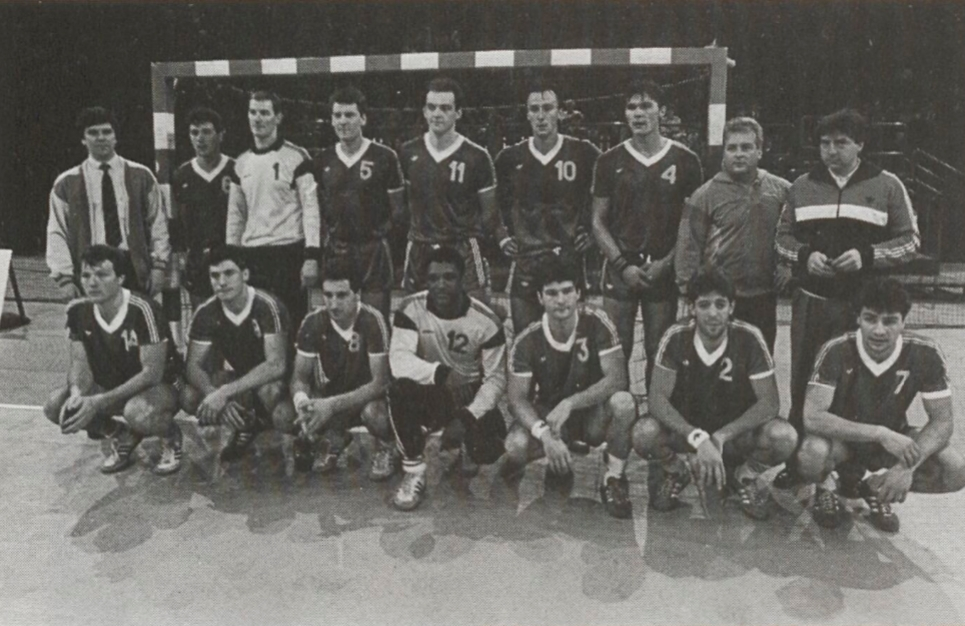
The Paris-Racing-Asnières squad in 1988.

During the 1992–93 season, under the management of Patrice Canayer, PSG competed in the Division 1, the top tier of French handball, finishing sixth with a balanced record of wins and defeats. In the Coupe de France, the team reached the quarter-finals before being eliminated by Vénissieux. The season marked a transitional but stable foundation for PSG's handball project, combining experienced internationals such as Patrick Cazal with the club's first steps under the PSG identity.

The following season, PSG reinforced its squad with Nenad Peruničić from Red Star Belgrade and made its European debut in the EHF European Cup, reaching the semi-finals after defeating Karviná and Benfica before losing to Drott of Sweden. Domestically, PSG finished fifth in the French Championship, just missing European qualification, and were eliminated in the round of 16 of the Coupe de France by Gagny. Meanwhile, the reserve team won the Nationale 3 title.

PSG entered a period of consolidation and renewed ambition under Macedonian manager Risto Magdinčev, who took charge for the 1994–95 season. French internationals Denis Lathoud and Stéphane Stoecklin joined the squad to replace Peruničić. Despite an early-season injury to Lathoud, PSG steadily improved, finishing fourth in the French Championship. The team also reached the semi-finals of the Coupe de France, where they were eliminated by OM Vitrolles, and secured qualification for the EHF European Cup.

In 1995–96, PSG strengthened further with world champion pivot Gaël Monthurel, aiming to challenge OM Vitrolles for the national title. The team achieved its best domestic performance to date, finishing second in the league with 20 wins, 3 draws, and 3 losses, including two defeats to OM. PSG were eliminated in the quarter-finals of the Coupe de France by Ivry and suffered a surprise early exit from the EHF European Cup against Norwegian side Drammen.

The 1996–97 season saw PSG qualify for the EHF Champions League following the financial relegation of OM Vitrolles. Stoecklin departed for Germany and was replaced by Macedonian Tomče Petreski. The team struggled domestically, finishing fourth in the French Championship, 13 points behind champions Ivry, and were eliminated in the quarter-finals of the Coupe de France by Créteil. In the Champions League, the team defeated Hasselt in the round of 16 but finished last in the group stage, recording five defeats in six matches. The disappointing campaign led to Magdinčev's departure, leaving the club without a title during his tenure.

=== Decline and end of the PSG era ===
Following a disappointing campaign, PSG appointed young manager Nicolas Cochery ahead of the 1997–98 season. The club lost its leading figure, Denis Lathoud, who joined Ivry alongside Dejan Lukić, and recruited Egyptian pivot Sameh Abdel Waress as his replacement. The season quickly unraveled: PSG opened with a five-match losing streak, while Abdel Waress suffered a shoulder injury that effectively ended his Paris career. Further setbacks included injuries to Gaël Monthurel and Stéphane Cordinier, the temporary signing of Radovan Djurković as a medical joker, and a doping suspension for Christophe Zuniga. PSG finished 8th in the French Championship, 27 points behind champions Montpellier. Despite reaching the Coupe de France semi-finals, they were eliminated by Montpellier, and exited the EHF European Cup in the round of 16 against Szeged.

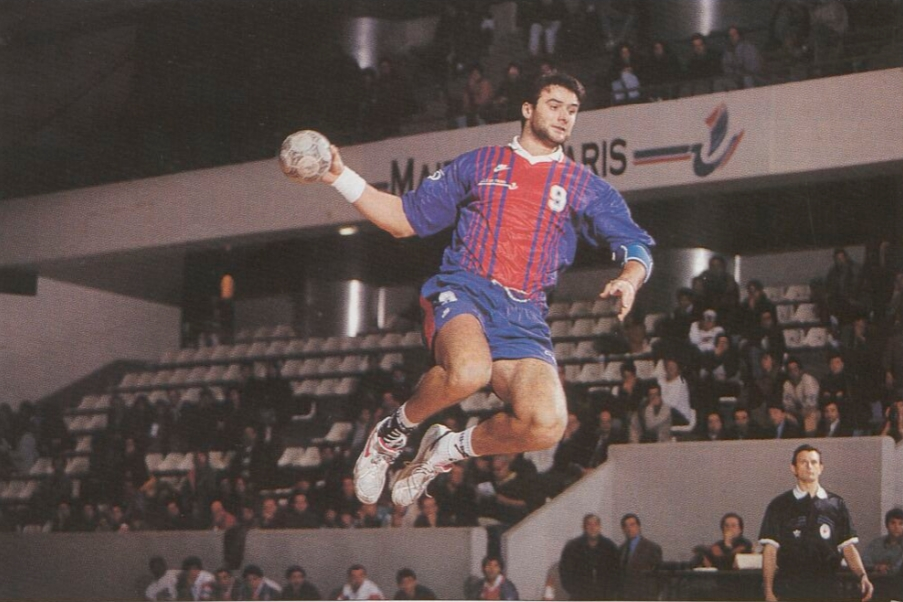
PSG-Asnières player Nenad Peruničić in 1993.

In 1998–99, the return of Bernard Latchimy after a season in Germany failed to compensate for the departures of Cordinier and Monthurel, the latter becoming manager at Saintes. Abdel Waress remained on the roster despite being sidelined for over a year and never returning to competition. After two opening defeats, PSG reinforced the squad with Yugoslav international Nikola Vojinović and Christophe Marais. While the Stojiljković–Vojinović pairing showed attacking promise, inconsistency plagued the team. PSG finished 6th in the league, with their strongest run again coming in the Coupe de France, where they reached the semi-finals before losing to Toulouse. Individually, Zoran Stojiljković stood out as the league's top scorer with 159 goals.

Ahead of the 1999–2000 season, PSG underwent another major rebuild, losing several experienced players, including Marais, Nicolas Farrenc, Gérald Motte, Christian Bertreux, and Fabrice Leton. To raise ambitions, the club recruited French internationals Olivier Girault, Stéphane Raphanel, and Stéphane Zuzo. PSG made a promising start and remained in contention for European qualification deep into the season, but a defeat at Livry-Gargan on the penultimate matchday cost them third place. The Coupe de France represented a final chance to secure Europe, but a heavy 32–25 semi-final loss to Dunkerque ended those hopes. PSG finished 4th in the French Championship, and Cochery left the club at the end of the season after failing to qualify for Europe.

Following the disappointment of the previous campaign, PSG appointed former Boro Golić from Nîmes as manager, ushering in a period of renewed ambition. Goalkeeper Francis Franck departed for Germany and was replaced by Arnaud Siffert, as PSG assembled a competitive and motivated squad. The team made a strong start to the season, winning their first four matches and reaching the winter break with eight wins from ten games. After 20 matchdays, PSG sat second behind Chambéry, but a dip in form late in the season saw them finish 4th in the French Championship. Despite falling short of the title race, PSG secured qualification for the EHF European Cup and enjoyed an impressive run in the Coupe de France, reaching the final. Playing at Coubertin, Paris were defeated 30–26 by Montpellier, but the campaign was widely viewed as a success, marking a clear improvement and a return to competitiveness at the national level.

=== Coupe de France winners ===
PSG reinforced its squad with the signing of Icelandic international Gunnar Viktorsson; however, several key departures weakened the team, including Bernard Latchimy, Stéphane Raphanel, and captain Zoran Stojiljković. Following the departure of Charles Biétry, the PSG multisport structure gradually collapsed, leaving handball as the club's sole remaining section and leading to a reduction in ambitions. During the 2001–02 season, PSG were eliminated from the EHF European Cup in the round of 16 on away goals by Macedonian side Pelister, who later reached the final. Domestically, the club finished fifth in the French Championship and were narrowly eliminated in the Coupe de France quarter-finals, losing 27–26 to Montpellier.

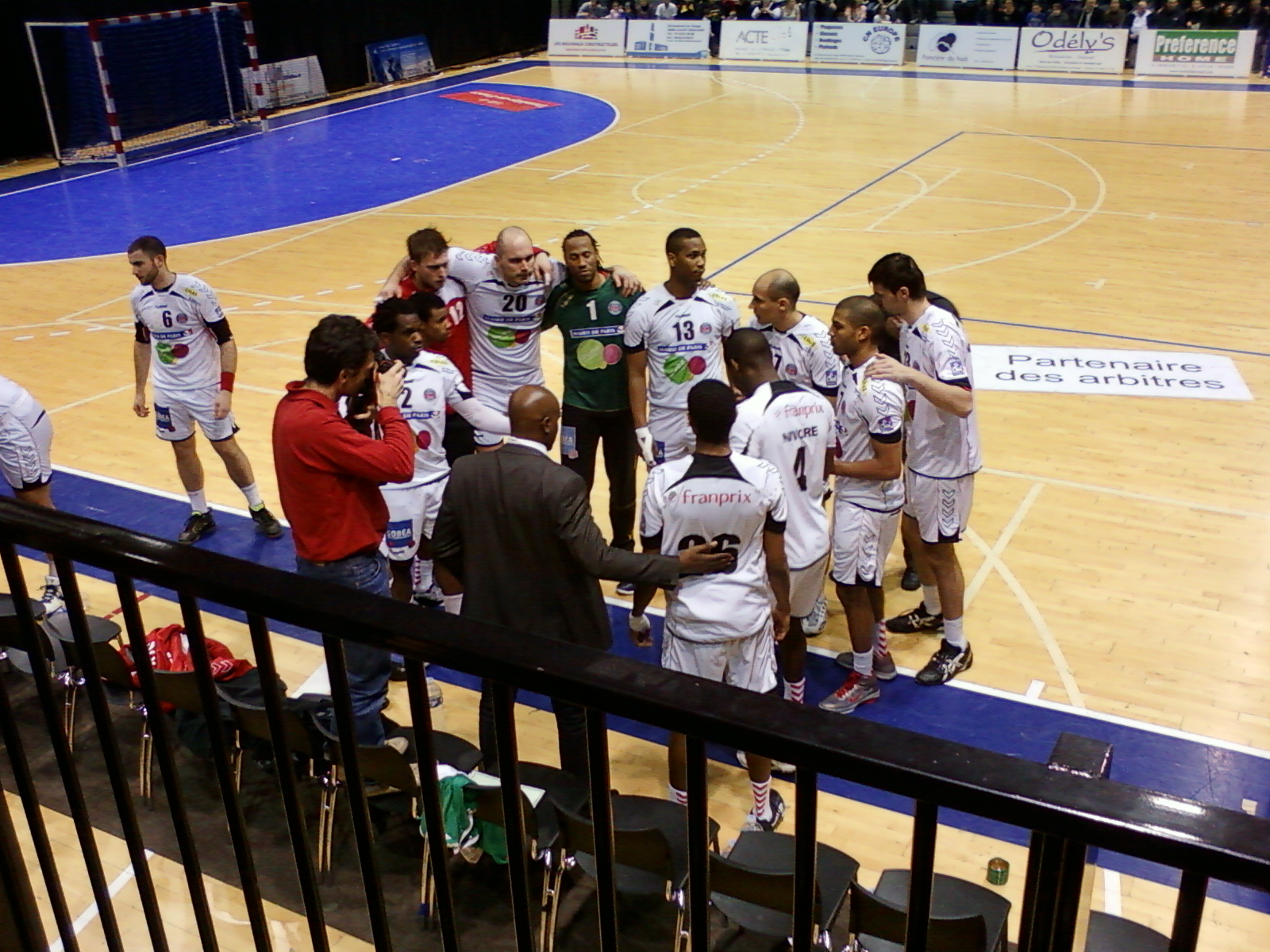
Paris Handball during a match in 2011.

On 25 May 2002, Louis Nicollin acquired the club, which was subsequently renamed Paris Handball, marking the official end of the PSG multisport project initiated by Canal+ and Charles Biétry. In 2003, Nicollin succeeded Gérard Picard as club president, a position he held until 2010. During the Nicollin era, under manager Thierry Anti, Paris reached the round of 16 in the 2005–06 EHF Champions League, won the club's first major trophy by defeating Aix in the 2007 Coupe de France final, and reaching a second cup final in 2008, where they lost to Montpellier. The reserve team also experienced success, winning consecutive titles in the Pré-nationale in 2006 and the Nationale 3 in 2007, securing promotion to the Nationale 2.

Freshly retired Paris player Olivier Girault succeeded Thierry Anti as head coach for the 2008–09 season, which ended with the club finishing 13th in Division 1 and being relegated. PSG responded by winning the Division 2 title in 2009–10, securing an immediate return to the top flight. In March 2010, club owner Louis Nicollin sold Paris to a group of investors led by former Paris Handball player Bruno Martini, and Jean-Paul Ouillon was appointed president in May 2010. Upon their return to the elite division in the 2010–11 season, Paris finished 11th in the league, with academy graduate Kévynn Nyokas establishing himself in the first team. In the 2011–12 season, under head coach François Berthier, the club narrowly avoided relegation, finishing 12th on the final matchday.

A new era began in June 2012 when Paris Handball was acquired by Qatar Sports Investments (QSI), the owners of Paris Saint-Germain, and the club reverted to the PSG name. A new sporting and executive structure was introduced, with Nasser Al-Khelaifi replacing Ouillon as president, and Philippe Gardent appointed head coach, assisted by Thierry Perreux. In pursuit of immediate success, PSG signed several high-profile international players, including French Olympic gold medallists Didier Dinart, Luc Abalo, and Samuel Honrubia, 2011 IHF World Player of the Year Mikkel Hansen, Croatian international Marko Kopljar, and Spanish internationals José Manuel Sierra and Antonio García. Since the Qatari takeover, PSG have operated with a budget exceeding €17 million, the largest in European handball, ahead of other leading clubs such as Kiel (€9.5 million) and Montpellier (€7.6 million).

=== Second PSG era and first league title ===
Backed by a star-studded squad, PSG quickly established itself as a dominant force in French handball during the 2012–13 season. The team's success could be connected to the betting scandal that heavily affected rivals Montpellier, although PSG were not entirely spared, as Samuel Honrubia and Mladen Bojinović were suspended in connection with the investigation. With an exceptional record of 24 wins, one draw, and one defeat, PSG secured the first French Championship title in the club's history, clinching it five matchdays before the season's end and qualifying for the EHF Champions League. The team narrowly missed out on a domestic double, losing 35–28 to Montpellier in the Coupe de France final, and were eliminated in the quarter-finals of the Coupe de la Ligue by Nantes. At the end of the season, Didier Dinart retired, leaving behind the most illustrious record in French team sports.

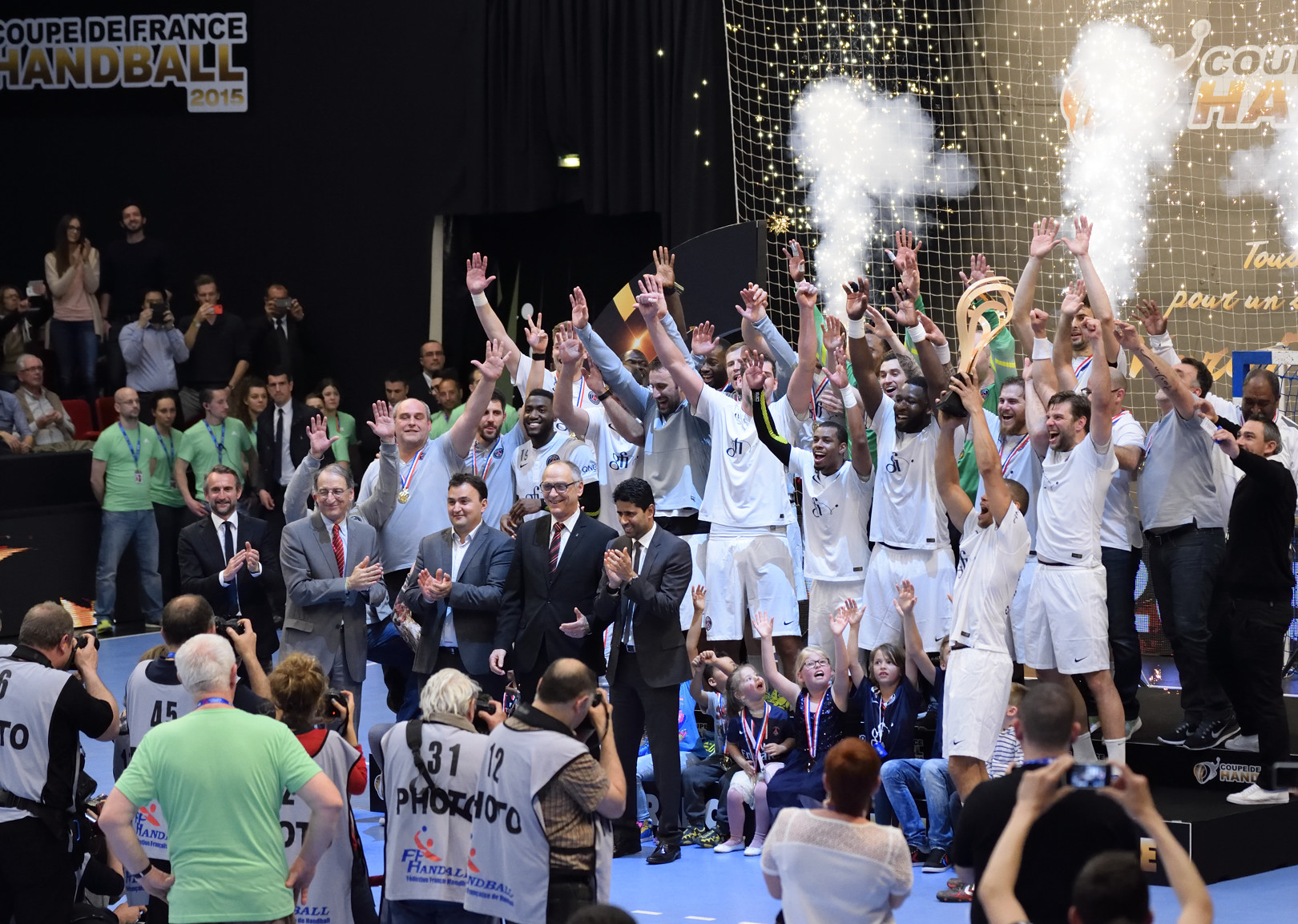
PSG won their third Coupe de France title in 2015.

PSG strengthened its squad for the 2013–14 season with high-profile signings, including Daniel Narcisse, Croatians Igor Vori and Jakov Gojun, as well as Fahrudin Melić and Gábor Császár. The club reached the quarter-finals of the EHF Champions League for the first time in its history but were eliminated by Veszprém just short of the Final Four. Domestically, Paris was unable to match the consistency of Dunkerque, who claimed their first French Championship title. The season ended on a positive note with a Coupe de France victory over Chambéry, securing PSG's second historic national cup. PSG also finished third in the Trophée des Champions at the start of the season and were eliminated in the quarter-finals of the Coupe de la Ligue by Saint-Raphaël.

In the 2014–15 season, PSG engaged in a tight battle with Montpellier and secured the second French Championship title in the club's history during the final stretch. A victory over Tremblay on the last matchday allowed PSG to lift the trophy, completing a domestic treble. Earlier in the season, the club had claimed its second trophy by defeating Nantes in the Coupe de France final at their home arena, Coubertin, having previously won their first Trophée des Champions title against Dunkerque. The only domestic competition to elude PSG was the Coupe de la Ligue, where they were eliminated by Nantes in the quarter-finals. In European competition, PSG came close to qualifying for the EHF Champions League Final Four for the first time but were once again eliminated by Veszprém.

Under new manager Zvonimir Serdarušić and strengthened by the arrival of French international Nikola Karabatić, PSG won the Trophée des Champions and claimed their third French Championship title in the 2015–16 season. The club also reached the finals of the Coupe de la Ligue and the Coupe de France, losing both to Montpellier. In European competition, PSG qualified for their first EHF Champions League Final Four. Season highlights included a home victory over Veszprém at Carpentier, an away win against Kiel—whose arena had remained unbeaten for four years—and topping Group A ahead of Flensburg, allowing the team to bypass the round of 16. Serdarušić's side ultimately finished third, losing to Kielce in the semi-finals but defeating Kiel again in the third-place match. Individually, Mikkel Hansen set a new record for the most goals scored in a single edition, with 141 goals.

=== Champions League runners-up ===
For the 2016–17 season, PSG signed world-class players Luka Stepančić and Uwe Gensheimer, as well as emerging talent Nedim Remili. The club dominated the domestic scene, winning the Trophée des Champions for the third consecutive year, claiming their first Coupe de la Ligue title after three previous final losses, and securing a third consecutive French Championship, finishing ahead of Nantes in all three competitions. They were, however, eliminated in the round of 16 of the Coupe de France by Montpellier. PSG also made its first appearance at the IHF Men's Super Globe, reaching the final, where they lost 29–28 to defending champions Füchse Berlin. Gensheimer, the league and European top scorer, led Paris to the EHF Champions League final, where they were edged out 24–23 by Vardar. Meanwhile, the reserve team won the Nationale 2 title and achieved promotion to the Nationale 1.

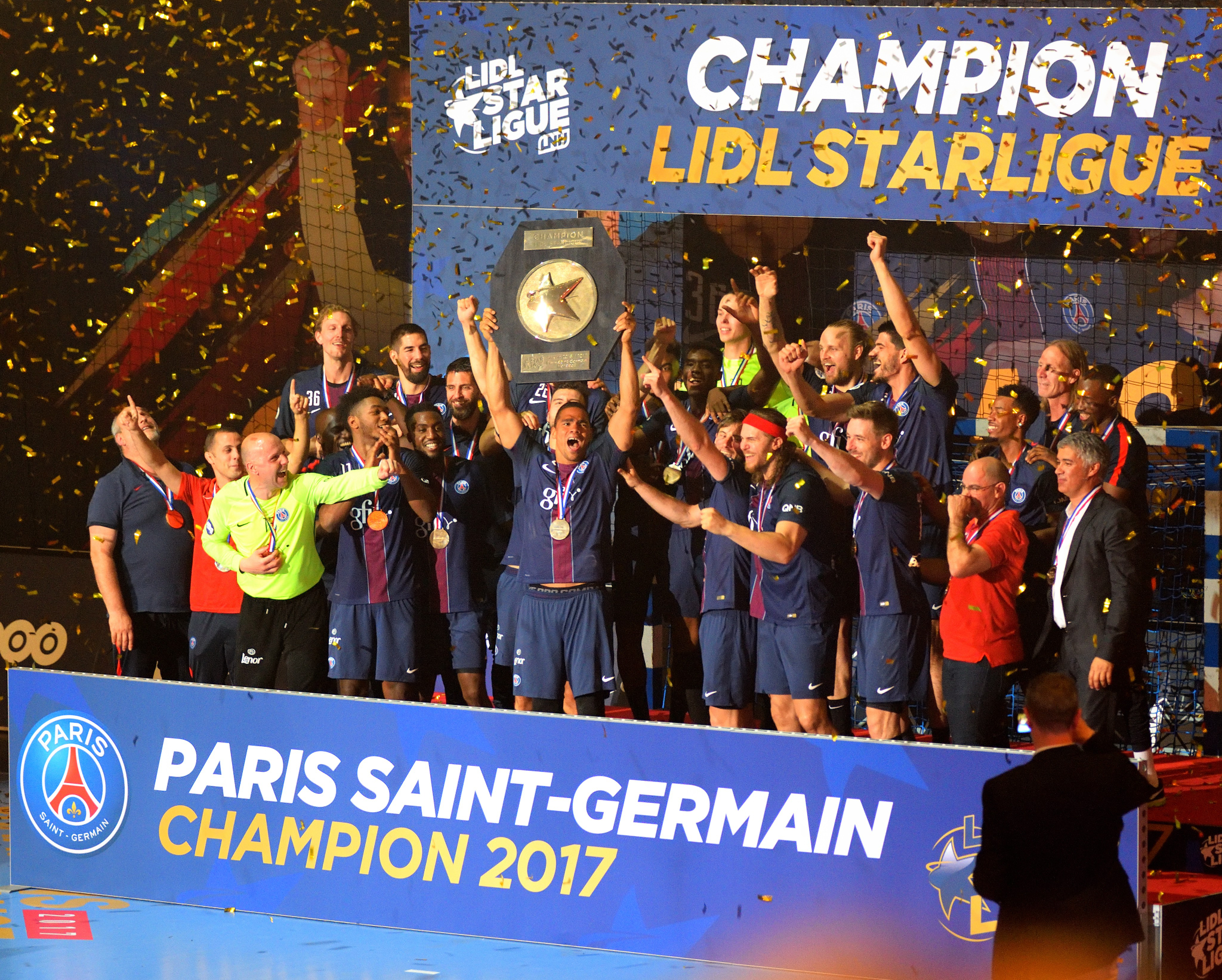
PSG lifting the 2016–17 league trophy.

PSG won the French Championship for a fourth consecutive season in 2017–18, securing their fifth league title in six seasons since 2012. Daniel Narcisse played the final match of his career, scoring in the closing minutes of a 30–26 home victory over Chambéry on the final matchday to clinch the title. Paris finished level on points with Montpellier but were crowned champions based on a superior head-to-head goal difference. In addition to the league, PSG completed a domestic treble by winning both the Coupe de France and the Coupe de la Ligue. The only setback was the season-opening Trophée des Champions final, in which PSG lost to Nantes. In European competition, the club reached the EHF Champions League Final Four for the third consecutive season but were eliminated in the semi-finals by Nantes.

For the 2018–19 season, Raúl González replaced Serdarušić as manager, while PSG retained most of the squad’s key players, including veteran goalkeeper Thierry Omeyer for his final season. González led the club to the French Championship and the Coupe de la Ligue. PSG secured their fifth consecutive league title, and sixth overall, with four matches remaining. The team, however, finished fourth in the Trophée des Champions and were eliminated from the Coupe de France quarter-finals by Montpellier. In European competition, PSG were eliminated in the EHF Champions League quarter-finals by Kielce, marking another disappointment on the continental stage. The season also marked Omeyer's final domestic title before his retirement, as well as the last PSG campaigns for Gensheimer and Stepančić.

PSG began the 2019–20 season by winning their fourth Trophée des Champions, defeating Montpellier. The club remained unbeaten at the start of the league season and held a six-point lead at the top of the table when the campaign was suspended due to the COVID-19 pandemic. The Ligue Nationale de Handball (LNH) subsequently canceled the final eight matchdays and awarded PSG their sixth consecutive league title and seventh overall. The Coupe de France and the Coupe de la Ligue were also annulled, with PSG still in the semi-finals of both competitions. In the EHF Champions League, the competition resumed with a Final Four in December 2020 following the lockdown. PSG were eliminated in the semi-finals by Barcelona but secured third place after defeating Veszprém, marking the club's third third-place finish in the competition, after 2016 and 2018.

=== Perfect league season ===
Having lost four previous Coupe de France finals to Montpellier (2001, 2008, 2013 and 2016), PSG ended the streak during the 2020–21 season by defeating Montpellier 30–26 to claim their fifth Coupe de France title. The Parisians then beat Cesson Rennes to secure the French Championship and complete a league–cup double. With two matches remaining, they could no longer be caught by Montpellier, who sat second, three points behind with only one game left. The title was PSG's seventh consecutive league championship and eighth overall, equalling the number of titles held by city rivals Ivry. PSG's pursuit of the EHF Champions League once again fell short, following a surprising semi-final defeat to Aalborg. The club took comfort by defeating Nantes 31–28 in the "small final" of the Final Four, finishing on the podium for the fourth time in five Final Four appearances, after similar results in 2016, 2018 and 2020.

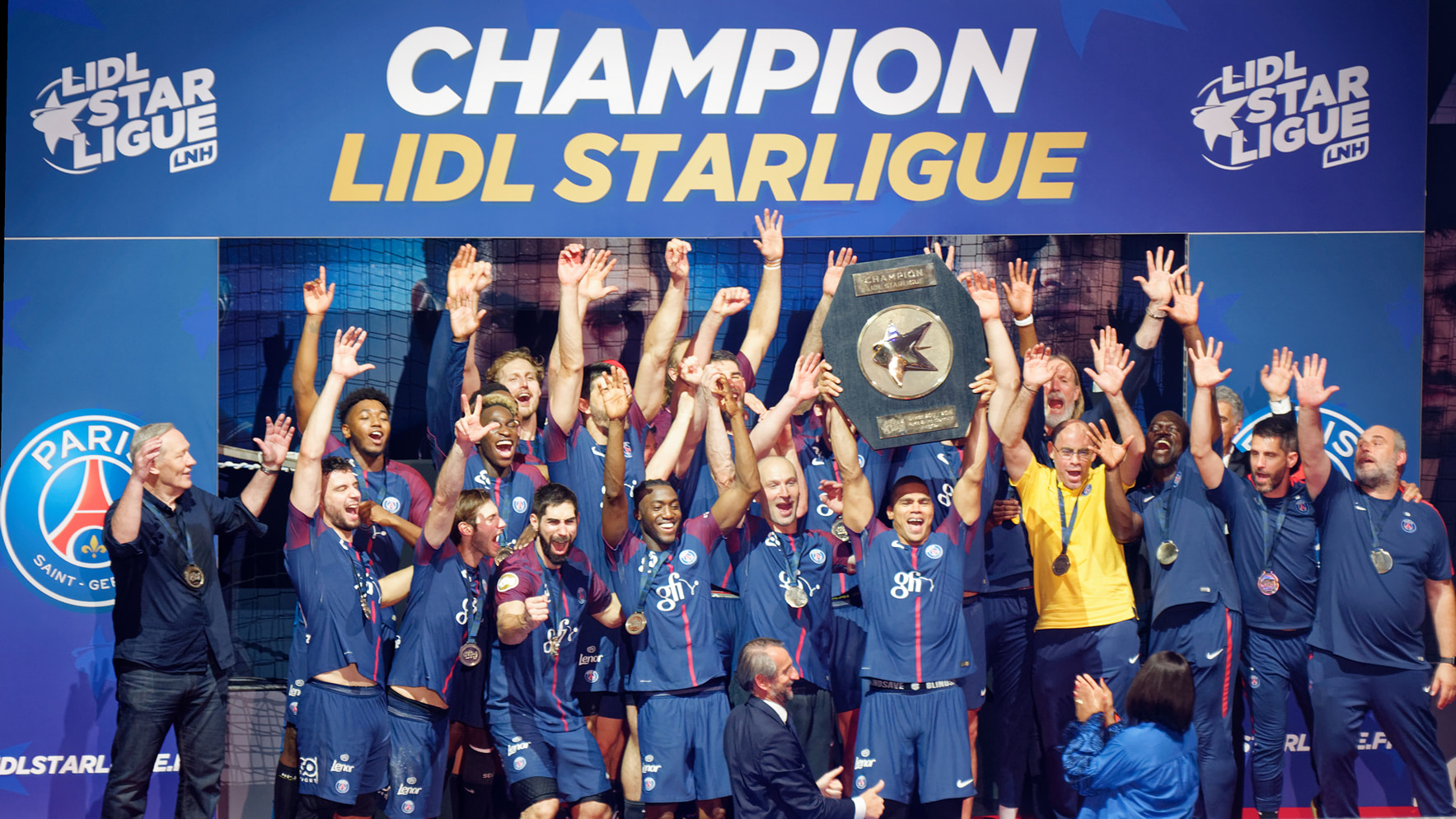
PSG clinched the domestic treble in the 2017–18 season.

By defeating Créteil on the final matchday of the 2021–22 season, PSG completed the first perfect season in the history of the French Championship, winning all 30 of their matches. The club also retained the Coupe de France, securing the league–cup double for the second consecutive season with a victory over Nantes. However, PSG were eliminated by a single goal in both the Coupe de la Ligue semi-finals against Chambéry in the tournament's final edition and the Champions League quarter-finals against Kiel. The season was also marked by the departure of several key figures, including Mikkel Hansen after ten years at the club, as well as goalkeepers Vincent Gérard and Yann Genty, and homegrown talents Benoît Kounkoud and Nedim Remili. Meanwhile, the U18 team secured the Championnat de France U18 title.

In the 2022–23 season, PSG secured their tenth French Championship title with a 35–32 victory over Nantes at Coubertin, following a closely contested title race with Nantes and Montpellier. Despite their league success, PSG lost the Trophée des Champions final to Nantes and were eliminated in the Coupe de France semi-finals after a 33–20 defeat away to Montpellier, the club's heaviest loss in any competition since its acquisition by QSI in 2012. In the EHF Champions League, PSG reached the Final Four but, for the first time in the club's history, failed to record a win at that stage and finished fourth.

PSG claimed their fifth Trophée des Champions title with a 35–25 victory over Nantes, avenging their defeat in the previous edition. The win provided a positive start to a 2023–24 season that ultimately proved mixed. The Coupe de France final, expected to be closely contested, instead ended in a decisive 31–23 victory for Nantes, who retained the title at the Accor Arena. PSG concluded the season on a high note by defeating Aix on the 30th and final matchday of the league, finishing one point ahead of Nantes to secure their 11th French championship overall and 10th consecutive title. The match also marked the final club appearance of French handball legend Nikola Karabatić, aged 40. The league title offered some solace for PSG following their elimination from the EHF Champions League quarter-finals by Barcelona, which prevented the club from qualifying for the Final Four.

=== Domestic dominance amid transition ===
Celebrations following PSG's league title in 2025.

The 2024–25 season, the first following Nikola Karabatić's retirement, proved challenging for PSG. The team lost to Nantes in the Trophée des Champions, failed to reach the EHF Champions League quarter-finals for the first time under QSI ownership after a home defeat to Szeged in the round of 16, and were beaten on penalties by Montpellier in the Coupe de France final following a 28–28 draw in regulation. Led by captain Luka Karabatic, Nikola's younger brother, PSG took consolation in securing their 12th French Championship and 11th consecutive league title after a home victory over Istres on the penultimate matchday, making them mathematically uncatchable by Nantes. Meanwhile, the U18 team took part in the inaugural 2025 EHF Youth Club Trophy.

Following the appointment of Danish manager Stefan Madsen, who replaced Raúl González, and a significant squad overhaul featuring seven departures and seven arrivals, PSG started the 2025–26 season with a defeat to Montpellier in the Trophée des Champions. The team's struggles continued in Europe, as they were again eliminated in the Champions League round of 16. Shortly after, PSG were knocked out of the Coupe de France at the semi-final stage. However, PSG responded strongly in the league. After a closely contested title race between the two sides, both unbeaten heading into Matchday 28, PSG defeated Nantes to claim their 13th French championship and 12th consecutive league title since 2015. A further highlight came from the U18 team, which claimed the Challenge de France.

PSG, who had lost the previous two editions of the Trophée des Champions, won the title by defeating Montpellier 21–20. The victory marked their return to the trophy and gave the reigning French champions a winning start to the 2026–27 season.

== Former names ==
Logo of Paris Handball.

Name	Period	Source
Patriotes d'Asnières	1941–1942	
Asnières Sports	1942–1985	
Asnières Racing Olympique 92	1985–1987	
Paris-Racing-Asnières	1987–1989	
Paris-Asnières Handball	1989–1992	
PSG-Asnières	1992–2002	
Paris Handball	2002–2012	
Paris Saint-Germain Handball	2012–Present	

== Grounds ==
The team's regular home ground is the Stade Pierre de Coubertin in Paris, France, which has a capacity of 4,016 spectators. The club moved into the venue in 1992 after becoming the handball section of Paris Saint-Germain FC ahead of the 1992–93 season. Coubertin remained the club's home arena even after PSG disengaged from the team in 2002. However, from the outset, PSG were required to stage their European fixtures at the Halle Georges Carpentier—also located in Paris and with a capacity of 4,800—after the European Handball Federation (EHF) declined to approve Coubertin, primarily due to the non-compliant dimensions of the playing area.

Following PSG's return to ownership in 2012, the club continued to alternate between the two venues, using Coubertin for domestic matches and Carpentier for European competitions until the end of the 2015–16 season. In particular, all of PSG's EHF Champions League home matches between 2013 and 2016 were played at Carpentier. During the summer of 2016, Coubertin underwent renovation and refurbishment works to meet EHF regulatory standards, enabling PSG to host Champions League matches at the arena from the 2016–17 season onward. Since then, the club have played all of their home fixtures—both domestic and European—at the Stade Pierre de Coubertin.

The Stade Pierre de Coubertin also serves as PSG's training ground; however, the club and its academy are expected to move into Campus PSG in 2028. By then, PSG plans to have constructed two judo dojos, two handball courts, and additional facilities, including a football stadium with a capacity of 5,000 spectators. Owned and funded by the club, the training complex already houses the men's and women's football teams, as well as the football academy, and is projected to also accommodate the judo section and its academy.

== Honours ==
As of 2026 Trophée des Champions.

Type	Competitions	Titles	Seasons
National	LNH Division 1	13	2012–13, 2014–15, 2015–16, 2016–17, 2017–18, 2018–19, 2019–20, 2020–21, 2021–22, 2022–23, 2023–24, 2024–25, 2025–26
National	LNH Division 2	2	1989–90, 2009–10
National	Coupe de France	6	2006–07, 2013–14, 2014–15, 2017–18, 2020–21, 2021–22
National	Coupe de la Ligue	3	2016–17, 2017–18, 2018–19
National	Trophée des Champions	6	2014, 2015, 2016, 2019, 2023, 2026
Reserve	Nationale 2	1	2016–17
Reserve	Nationale 3	2	1993–94, 2006–07
Reserve	Pré-nationale	1	2005–06
Under-18	Championnat de France U18	1	2021–22
Under-18	Challenge de France	1	2025–26

- record
- ^{s} shared record

== Statistics ==
=== Seasons ===
As of 2025–26 season.

From the 1980–81 season onwards.

List of seasons

Winners Runners-up Promoted Relegated

Season	League		Coupe de France	Coupe de la Ligue	Trophée des Champions	European competitions		Super Globe	League top scorers								
Season	1980–81	D2	Coupe de France	Coupe de la Ligue	Trophée des Champions	European competitions		Super Globe	5th	—N/a	—N/a	—N/a	—N/a	—N/a	—N/a	—N/a	—N/a
1981–82	D2	3rd	—N/a	—N/a	—N/a	—N/a	—N/a	—N/a	—N/a	—N/a							
1982–83	D2	3rd	—N/a	—N/a	—N/a	—N/a	—N/a	—N/a	—N/a	—N/a							
1983–84	D2	SF	—N/a	—N/a	—N/a	—N/a	—N/a	—N/a	—N/a	—N/a							
1984–85	D2	7th	R1	—N/a	—N/a	—N/a	—N/a	—N/a	—N/a	—N/a							
1985–86	D2	RU	R1	—N/a	—N/a	—N/a	—N/a	—N/a	—N/a	—N/a							
1986–87	D1	9th	R32	—N/a	—N/a	—N/a	—N/a	—N/a	(France) Roland Indriliunas	139							
1987–88	D1	7th	—N/a	—N/a	—N/a	—N/a	—N/a	—N/a	(Poland) Magic Fiedorow	88							
1988–89	D1	11th	—N/a	—N/a	—N/a	—N/a	—N/a	—N/a	(France) Jean-Louis Auxenfans	87							
1989–90	D2	1st	—N/a	—N/a	—N/a	—N/a	—N/a	—N/a	(Iceland) Júlíus Jónasson	168							
1990–91	D1	6th	R16	—N/a	—N/a	—N/a	—N/a	—N/a	(Iceland) Júlíus Jónasson	129							
1991–92	D1	6th	SF	—N/a	—N/a	—N/a	—N/a	—N/a	(Romania) Ion Mocanu	96							
1992–93	D1	6th	QF	—N/a	—N/a	—N/a	—N/a	—N/a	(Iceland) Júlíus Jónasson	95							
1993–94	D1	5th	R16	—N/a	—N/a	European Cup	SF	—N/a	(Socialist Federal Republic of Yugoslavia) Nenad Peruničić	215							
1994–95	D1	4th	SF	—N/a	—N/a	—N/a	—N/a	—N/a	(France) Stéphane Stoecklin	175							
1995–96	D1	2nd	QF	—N/a	—N/a	European Cup	R16	—N/a	—N/a	—N/a							
1996–97	D1	4th	QF	—N/a	—N/a	Champions League	GS	—N/a	—N/a	—N/a							
1997–98	D1	8th	SF	—N/a	—N/a	European Cup	R16	—N/a	—N/a	—N/a							
1998–99	D1	6th	SF	—N/a	—N/a	—N/a	—N/a	—N/a	(Socialist Federal Republic of Yugoslavia) Zoran Stojiljković	157							
1999–2000	D1	4th	SF	—N/a	—N/a	—N/a	—N/a	—N/a	(Socialist Federal Republic of Yugoslavia) Zoran Stojiljković	146							
2000–01	D1	4th	RU	—N/a	—N/a	—N/a	—N/a	—N/a	(Socialist Federal Republic of Yugoslavia) Nikola Vojinović	119							
2001–02	D1	5th	QF	QF	—N/a	European Cup	Round 4	—N/a	(France) Olivier Girault	122							
2002–03	D1	4th	QF	QF	—N/a	European Cup	Round 2	—N/a	(France) Olivier Girault	128							
2003–04	D1	4th	—N/a	QF	—N/a	European League	R16	—N/a	(France) Olivier Girault	131							
2004–05	D1	2nd	SF	RU	—N/a	European League	R32	—N/a	(France) Olivier Girault	109							
2005–06	D1	3rd	QF	RU	—N/a	Champions League	R16	—N/a	(Senegal) Ibrahim Diaw	98							
2006–07	D1	7th	W	QF	—N/a	European League	QF	—N/a	(France) Olivier Girault	123							
2007–08	D1	9th	RU	QF	—N/a	Cup Winners' Cup	R32	—N/a	(France) Olivier Girault	105							
2008–09	D1	13th	R16	SF	—N/a	Cup Winners' Cup	R16	—N/a	(France) Cédric Sorhaindo	118							
2009–10	D2	1st	SF	—N/a	—N/a	—N/a	—N/a	—N/a	—N/a	—N/a							
2010–11	D1	11th	R32	SF	—N/a	—N/a	—N/a	—N/a	(France) Mathias Ortega	124							
2011–12	D1	12th	QF	R16	—N/a	—N/a	—N/a	—N/a	(France) Nicolas Claire	121							
2012–13	D1	1st	RU	QF	—N/a	—N/a	—N/a	—N/a	(France) Luc Abalo	118							
2013–14	D1	2nd	W	SF	3rd	Champions League	QF	—N/a	(Montenegro) Fahrudin Melić	126							
2014–15	D1	1st	W	QF	W	Champions League	QF	—N/a	(Denmark) Mikkel Hansen	203							
2015–16	D1	1st	RU	RU	W	Champions League	3rd	—N/a	(Denmark) Mikkel Hansen	228							
2016–17	D1	1st	R16	W	W	Champions League	RU	RU	(Germany) Uwe Gensheimer	167							
2017–18	D1	1st	W	W	RU	Champions League	3rd	—N/a	(Denmark) Mikkel Hansen	127							
2018–19	D1	1st	QF	W	4th	Champions League	QF	—N/a	(Denmark) Mikkel Hansen	130							
2019–20	D1	1st	SF	SF	W	Champions League	3rd	—N/a	(Denmark) Mikkel Hansen	85							
2020–21	D1	1st	W	—N/a	—N/a	Champions League	3rd	—N/a	(Denmark) Mikkel Hansen	132							
2021–22	D1	1st	W	SF	—N/a	Champions League	QF	—N/a	(Poland) Kamil Syprzak	149							
2022–23	D1	1st	SF	—N/a	RU	Champions League	4th	—N/a	(Poland) Kamil Syprzak	184							
2023–24	D1	1st	RU	—N/a	W	Champions League	QF	—N/a	(Poland) Kamil Syprzak	220							
2024–25	D1	1st	RU	—N/a	RU	Champions League	PO	—N/a	(Poland) Kamil Syprzak	197							
2025–26	D1	1st	SF	—N/a	RU	Champions League	PO	—N/a	(Egypt) Yahia Omar	162							
2025–26	D1	TBD	TBD	—N/a	W	Champions League	TBD	—N/a	TBD	TBD							

=== Competitive record ===
As of 22 November 2026.

From the 1992–93 season onwards.

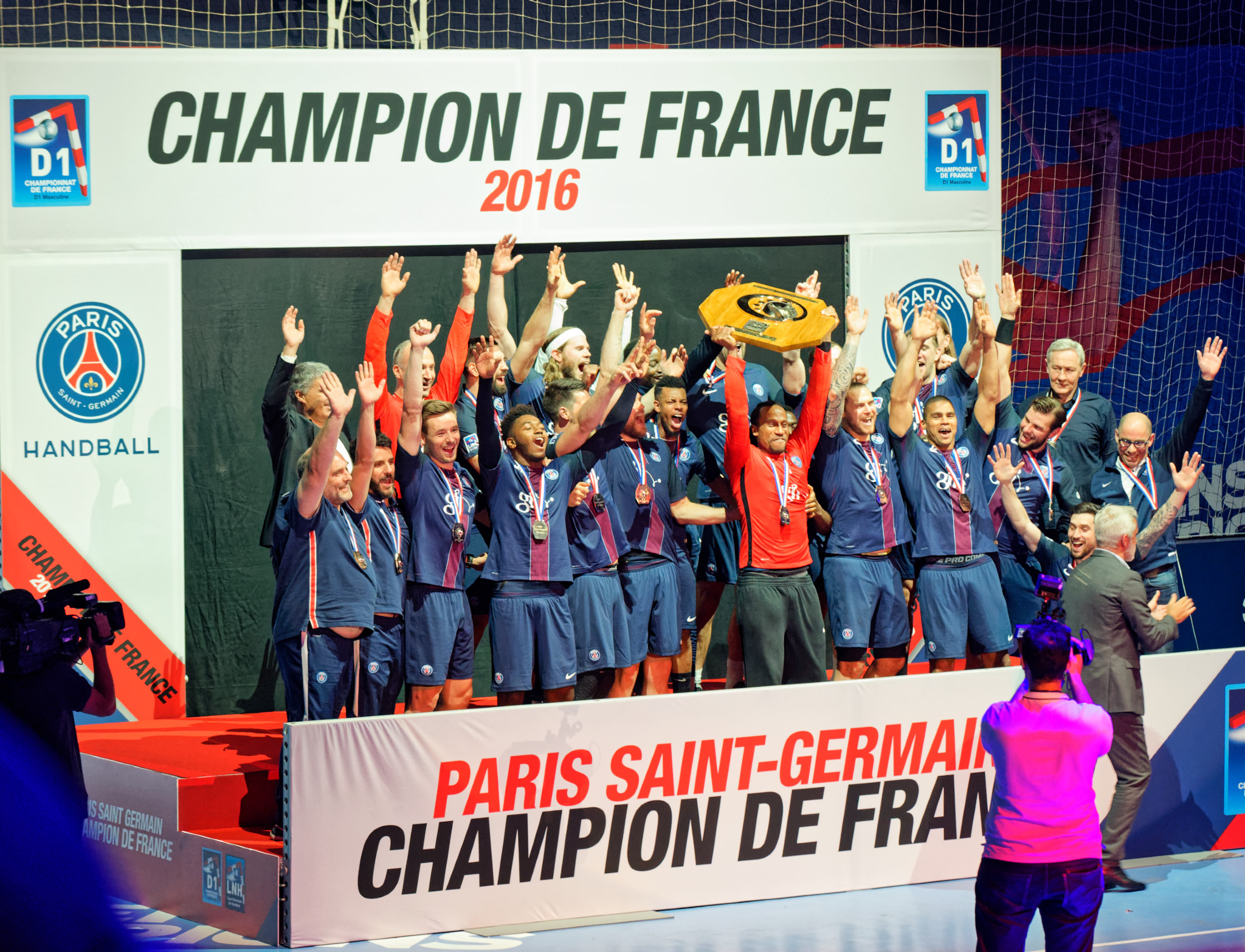
PSG being crowned French champions in 2016.

Competition	MP	W	D	L	WP%
League
LNH Division 1	867	592	58	217	68.28
LNH Division 2	26	18	3	5	69.23
National cups
Coupe de France	117	87	0	30	74.36
Coupe de la Ligue (defunct)	49	31	1	17	63.27
Trophée des Champions	18	11	0	7	61.11
International cups
EHF Champions League	235	154	16	65	65.53
EHF Cup Winners' Cup (defunct)	10	8	0	2	80.00
EHF European League	16	9	2	5	56.25
EHF European Cup	20	12	2	6	60.00
IHF Men's Super Globe	3	2	0	1	66.67
Total	1,357	921	81	355	67.87

== Players ==
=== Current squad ===
As of 24 August 2026.

Goalkeepers

- 1 (Denmark) Mikkel Løvkvist
- 12 (Spain) Rodrigo Corrales

Left Wingers

- 4 (Iceland) Bjarki Mar Elisson
- 9 (Sweden) Emil Mellegård
- 20 (France) Mathieu Grébille

Right Wingers

- 10 (Sweden) Sebastian Karlsson
- 14 (Spain) Ferran Solé

Line players

- 7 (France) Karl Konan
- 21 (Poland) Kamil Syprzak
- 22 (France) Luka Karabatic (captain)
- 26 (Denmark) Frederik Ladefoged

Left Backs

- 25 (Norway) Simen Lyse
- 47 (France) Wallem Peleka
- 71 (France) Elohim Prandi

Centre Backs

- 6 (Netherlands) Luc Steins
- 66 (France) Noah Gaudin

Right Backs

- 2 (Croatia) Mateo Maraš
- 5 (Egypt) Yahia Omar

== Academy ==
=== Reserve team ===
As of 14 September 2026.

Goalkeepers

- 77 (France) Djibril Sarre
- 91 (France) Elouan Brocandel

Left Wingers

- 18 (France) Tidiane Firmesse

Right Wingers

- 3 (France) Théo Ducap

Line players

- 31 (France) Vladimir Rousseau
- 45 (France) Seraphin Marie

Left Backs

- 15 (France) Nathan Lafosse

Centre Backs

- 13 (France) Lucas Richard
- 17 (France) Ethan Hulugalle Bandaranayake

Right Backs

- 94 (France) Emilien Montauban

=== Notable graduates ===
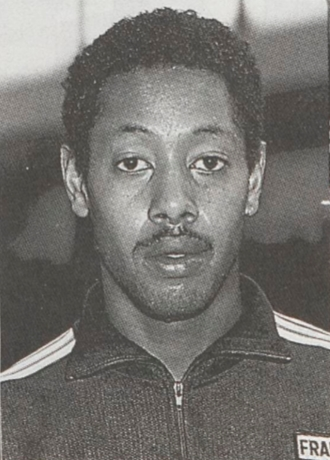
Jackson Richardson

Player	Position	Paris Saint-Germain	Source
(France) Jackson Richardson	Centre back	1989–1991	
(France) Patrick Cazal	Right back	1990–1994	
(France) Maxime Spincer	Goalkeeper	1986–1996	
(France) Bernard Latchimy	Right back	1990–1997, 1998–2001	
(Senegal) Ibrahim Diaw	Left back	2003–2009, 2011–2014	
(France) Cédric Sorhaindo	Pivot	2004–2009	
(France) Olivier Nyokas	Left back	2006–2008	
(France) Kévynn Nyokas	Right back	2006–2012	
(France) Mathias Ortega	Right wing	2007–2013	
(France) Nicolas Claire	Centre back	2008–2013	
(France) Rudy Nivore	Pivot	2010–2013	
(France) Jeffrey M'Tima	Left wing	2011–2017	
(France) Benoît Kounkoud	Right wing	2014–2022	
(France) Dylan Nahi	Left wing	2016–2021	
(France) Adama Keïta	Left wing	2017–2024	
(France) Sadou Ntanzi	Centre back	2020–2024	
(France) Gauthier Loredon	Pivot	2020–2026	
(France) Wallem Peleka	Left back	2021–Present	

== Notable players ==
=== Most goals ===
As of 10 October 2026.

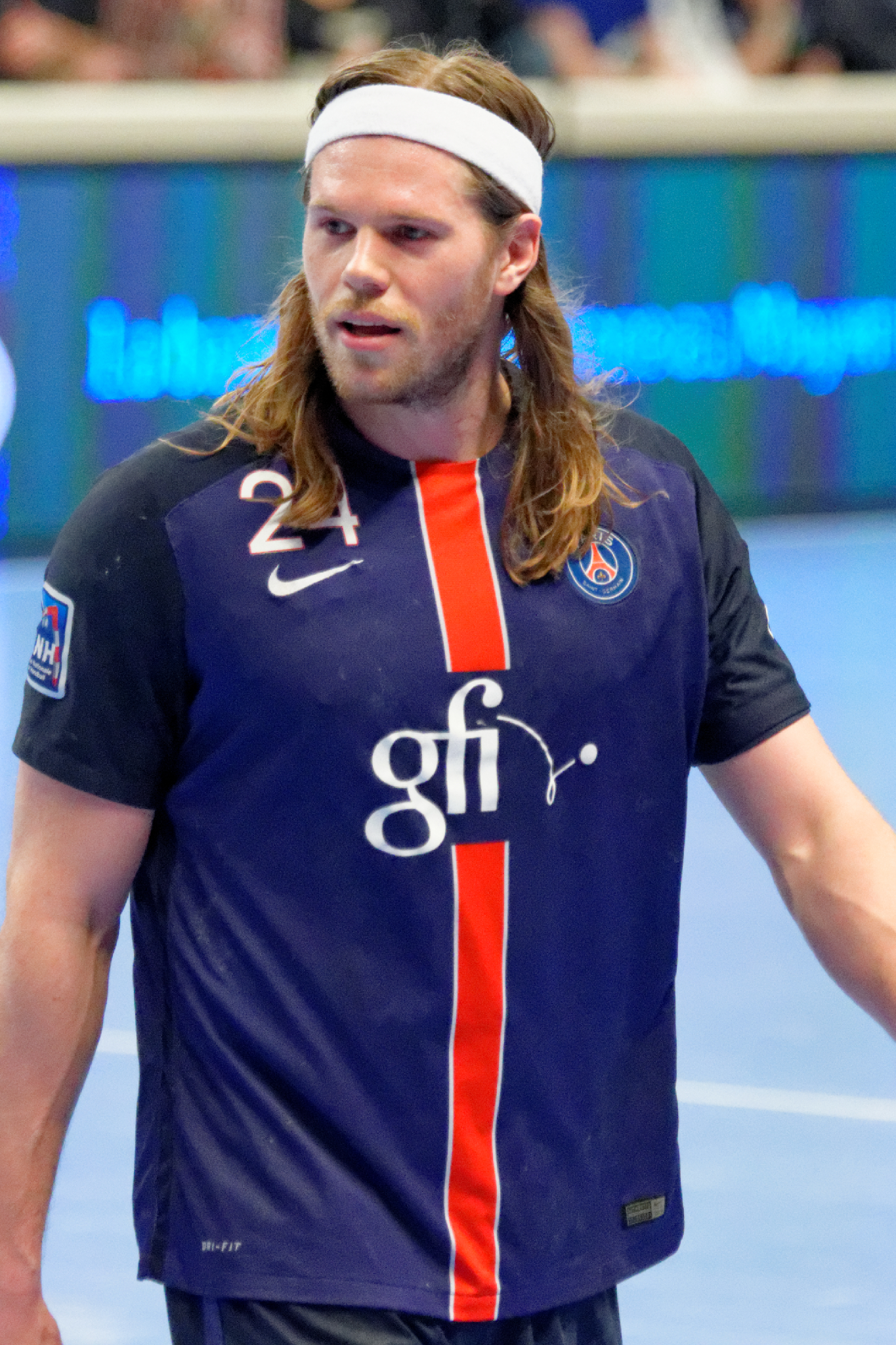
Mikkel Hansen

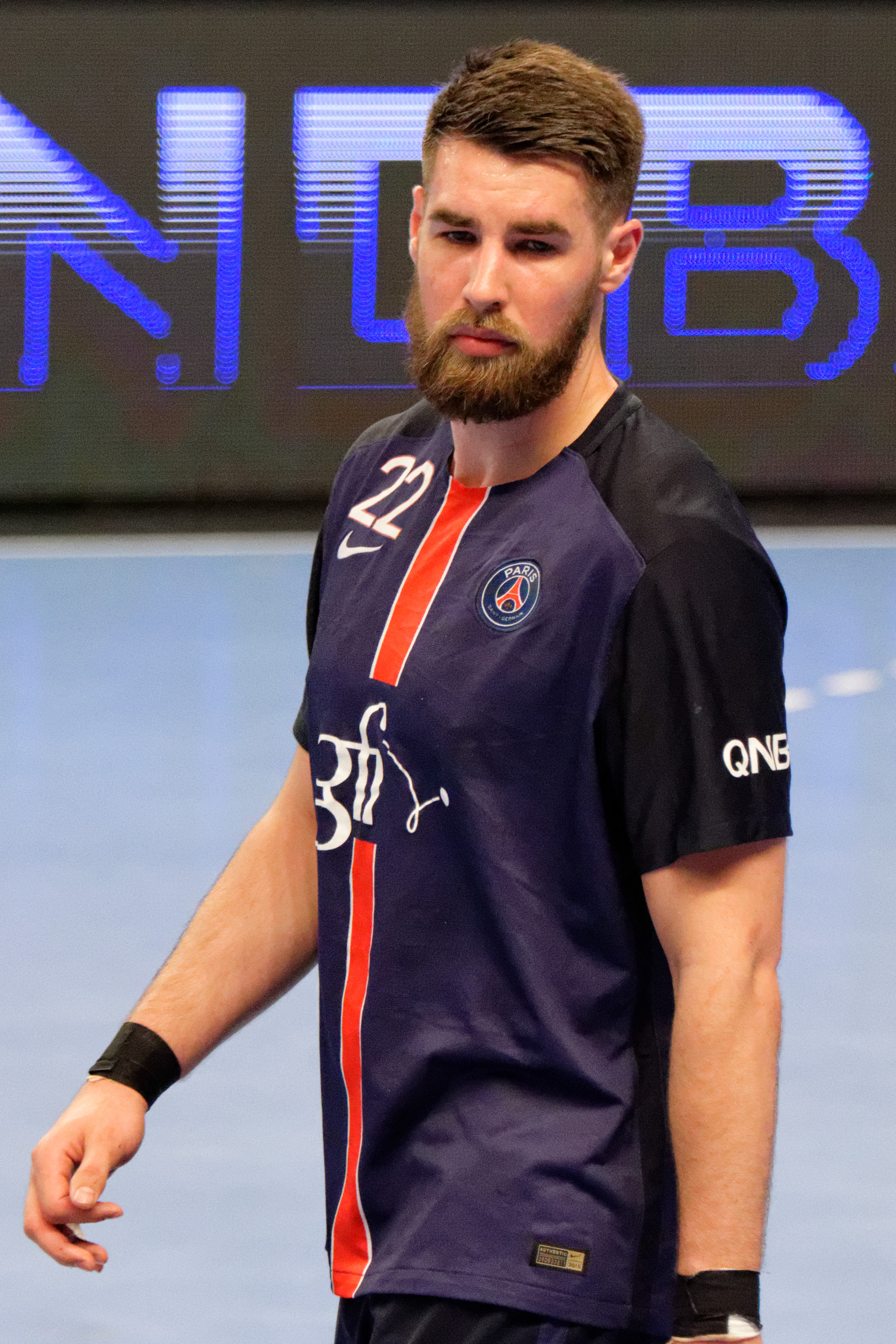
Luka Karabatić

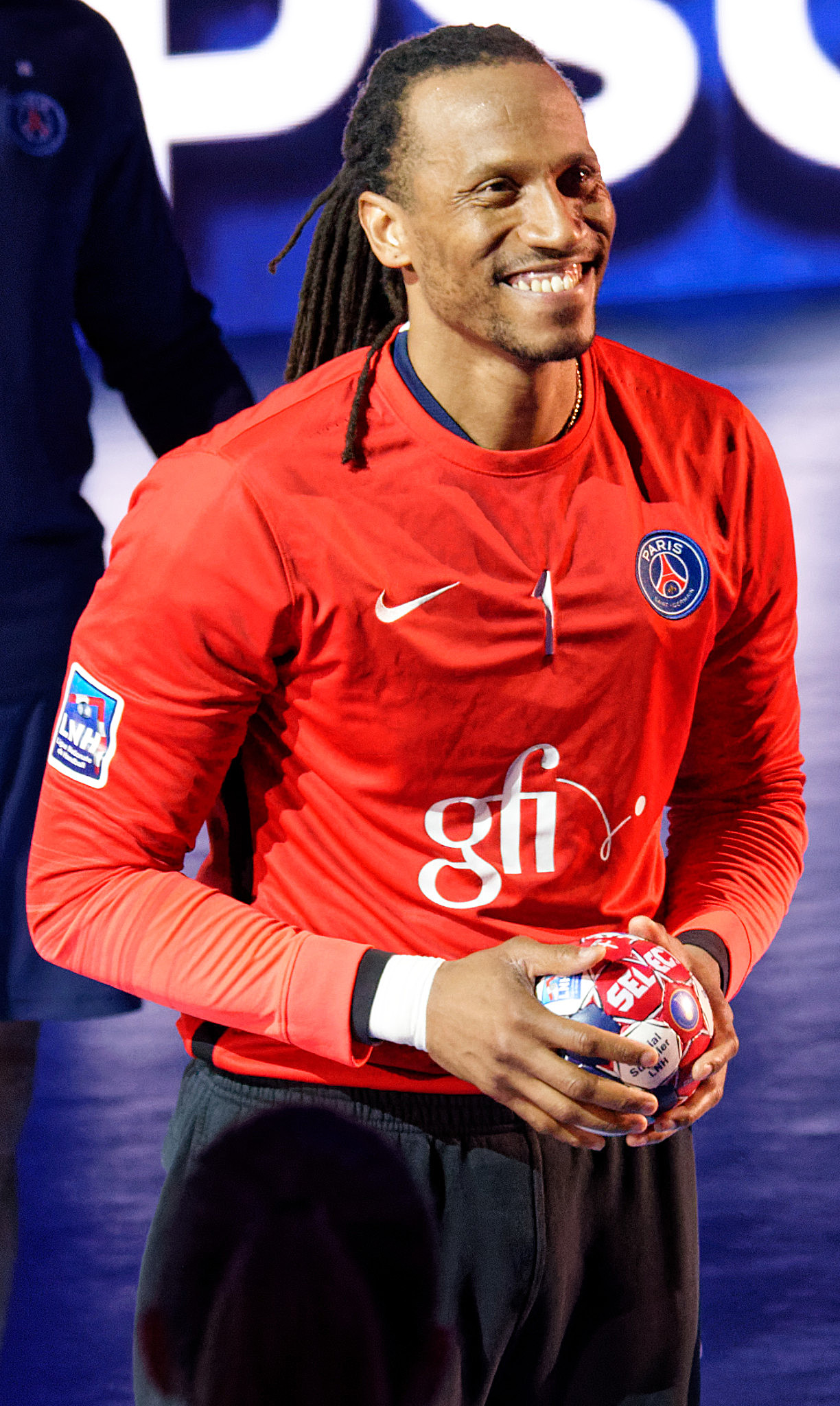
Patrice Annonay

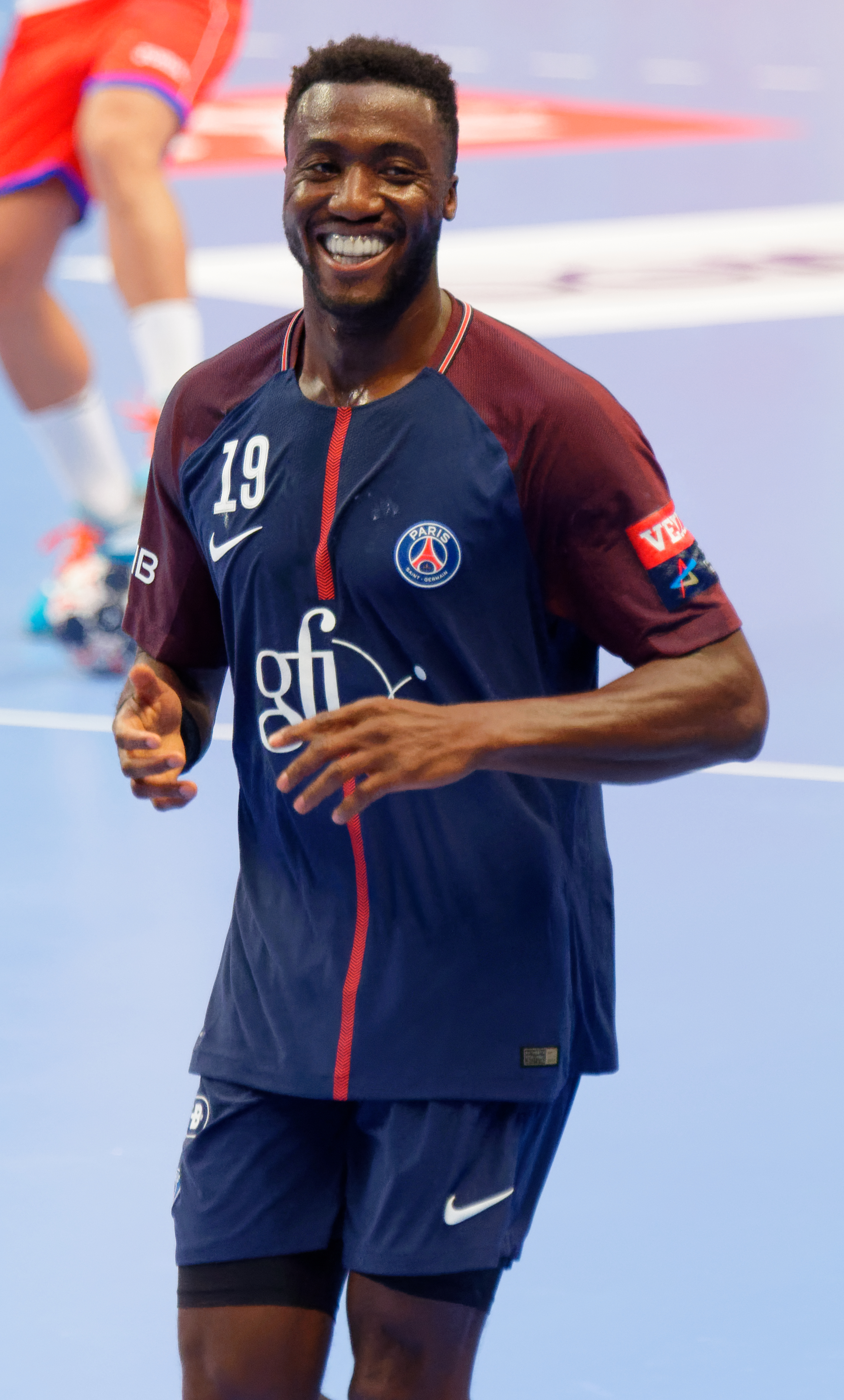
Luc Abalo

Rank	Player	Position	Paris Saint-Germain	Goals	Source
1	(Denmark) Mikkel Hansen	Left back	2012–2022	2321	
2	(Poland) Kamil Syprzak	Pivot	2019–Present	1770	
3	(France) Elohim Prandi	Left back	2020–Present	1409	
4	(France) Nedim Remili	Right back	2016–2022	1164	
5	(France) Nikola Karabatić	Centre back	2015–2024	1098	
6	(Spain) Ferran Solé	Right wing	2020–Present	984	
7	(France) Luka Karabatic	Pivot	2015–Present	936	
8	(Netherlands) Luc Steins	Centre back	2020–Present	909	
9	(France) Luc Abalo	Right wing	2012–2020	899	
10	(Germany) Uwe Gensheimer	Left wing	2016–2019	813	

=== Most appearances ===
As of 4 October 2026.

Rank	Player	Position	Paris Saint-Germain	Appearances	Source
1	(France) Luka Karabatic	Pivot	2015–Present	479	
2	(Denmark) Mikkel Hansen	Left back	2012–2022	416	
3	(France) Nikola Karabatić	Centre back	2015–2024	348	
4	(France) Patrice Annonay	Goalkeeper	2005–2016	333	
5	(Poland) Kamil Syprzak	Pivot	2019–Present	318	
6	(Spain) Ferran Solé	Right wing	2020–Present	300	
7	(France) Thierry Omeyer	Goalkeeper	2014–2019	239	
8	(France) Daniel Narcisse	Centre back	2013–2018	223	
9	(France) Nedim Remili	Right back	2016–2022	215	
10	(France) Luc Abalo	Right wing	2012–2020	207	

=== League top scorers ===
Season	Player	Position	Goals	Source
1989–90	(Iceland) Júlíus Jónasson	Right back	168	
1998–99	(Socialist Federal Republic of Yugoslavia) Zoran Stojiljković	Left back	157	
2014–15	(Denmark) Mikkel Hansen	Left back	203	
2015–16	(Denmark) Mikkel Hansen	Left back	228	
2016–17	(Germany) Uwe Gensheimer	Left wing	167	
2023–24	(Poland) Kamil Syprzak	Pivot	220	

=== Champions League top scorers ===
Season	Player	Position	Goals	Source
2015–16	(Denmark) Mikkel Hansen	Left back	141	
2016–17	(Germany) Uwe Gensheimer	Left back	115	
2017–18	(Germany) Uwe Gensheimer	Left wing	92	
2023–24	(Poland) Kamil Syprzak	Pivot	112	

=== Retired numbers ===
No.	Player	Position	Paris Saint-Germain	Source
1	(France) Patrice Annonay	Goalkeeper	2005–2016	
19	(France) Luc Abalo	Right wing	2012–2020	
24	(Denmark) Mikkel Hansen	Left back	2012–2022	
44	(France) Nikola Karabatić	Centre back	2015–2024	

=== Awards ===
- IHF World Player of the Year (3)
  - (Denmark) Mikkel Hansen (2) – 2015, 2018.
  - (France) Nikola Karabatić – 2016.

== Personnel ==
=== Current staff ===
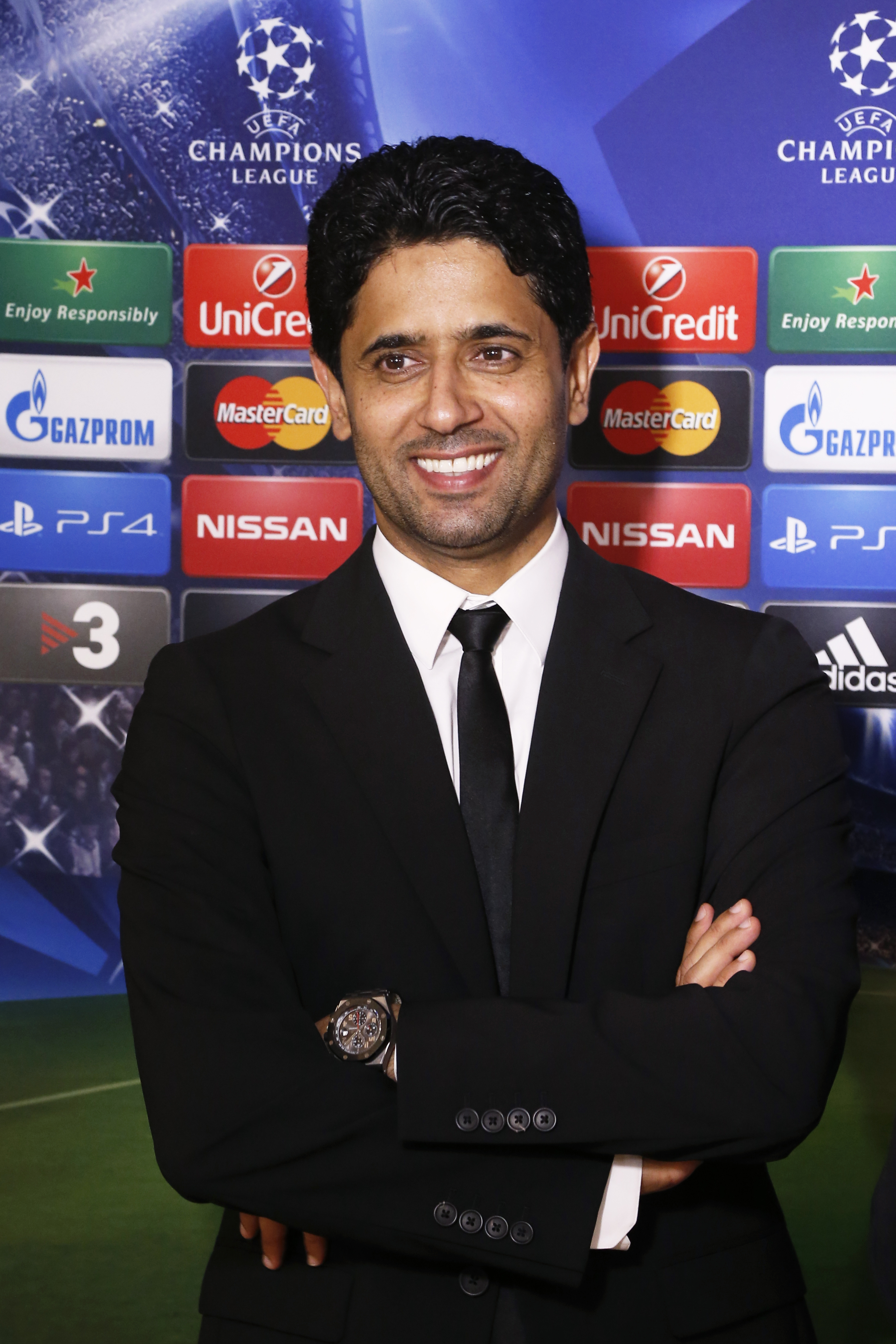
Nasser Al-Khelaïfi

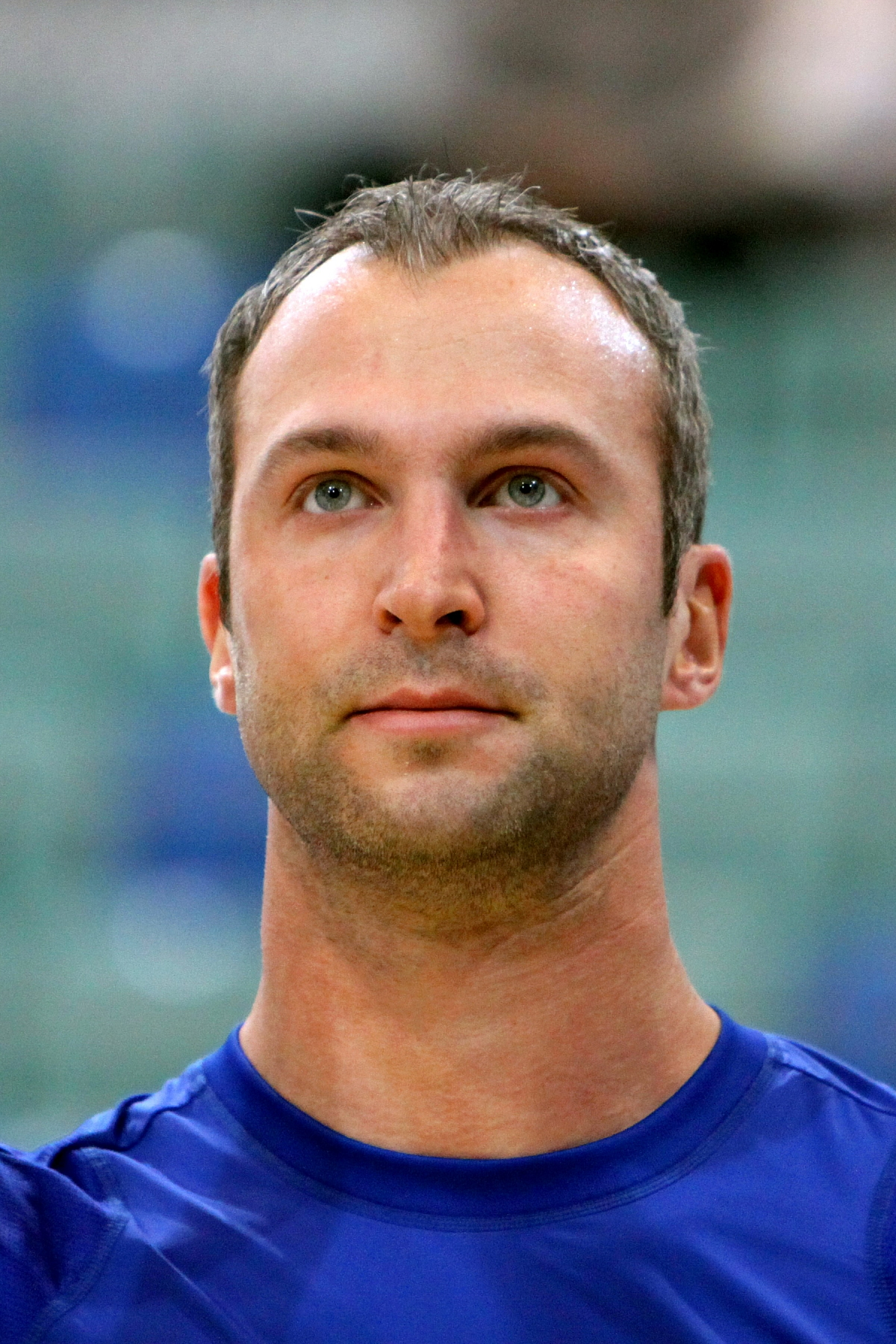
Thierry Omeyer

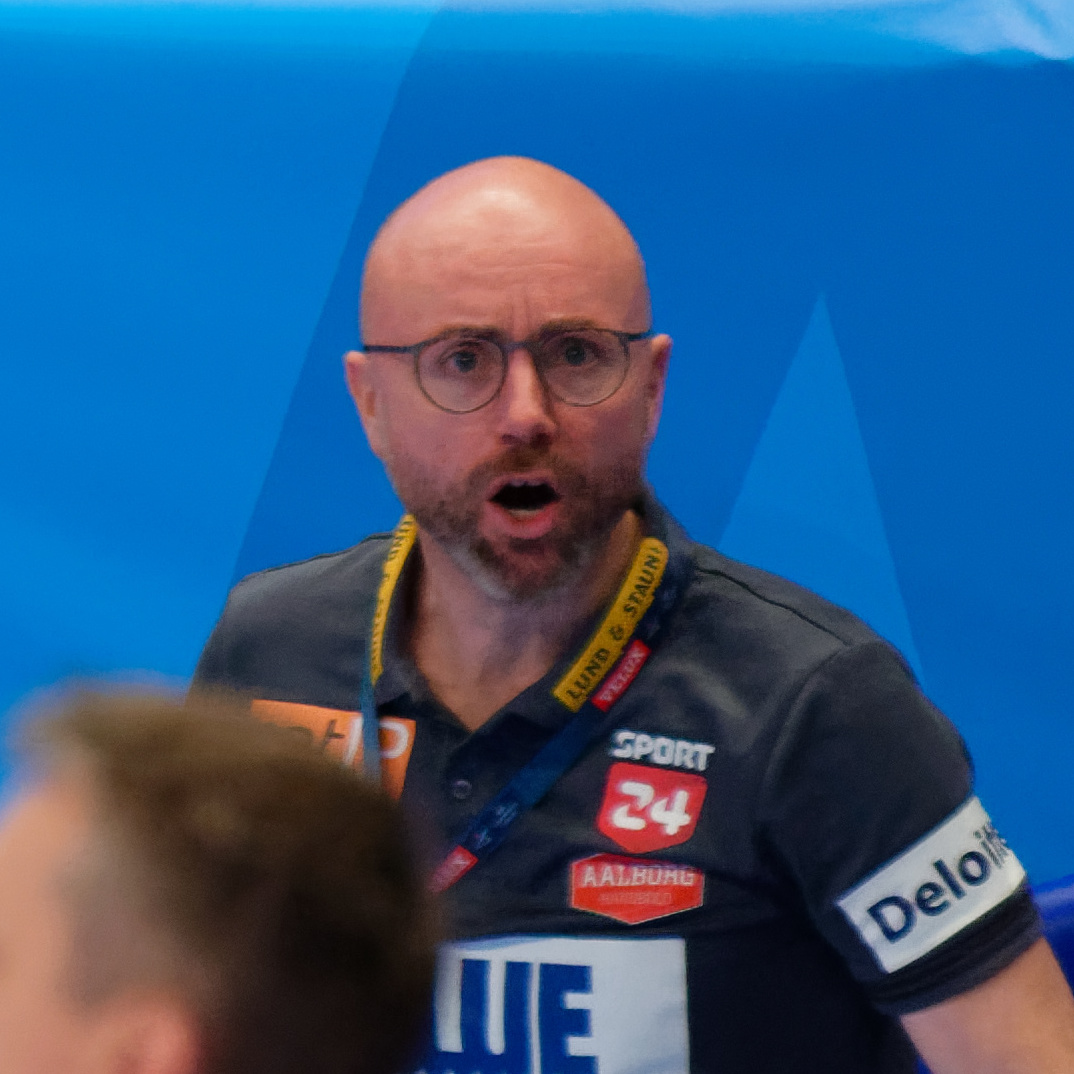
Stefan Madsen

Position	Name	Source
President	(Qatar) Nasser Al-Khelaifi	
General manager	(France) Thierry Omeyer	
Sports coordinator	(France) Daniel Narcisse	
Academy sporting director	(France) Maxime Spincer	
Assistant academy sporting director	(France) Thierry Perreux	
First-team head coach	(Denmark) Stefan Madsen	
Assistant coach	(Denmark) Henrik Møllgaard	
Goalkeeping coach	(Serbia) Dragan Počuča	
Reserve team head coach	(France) Pierre-Alexis Médina	

=== Presidents ===
No.	President	Tenure	D1	D2	CdF	CdL	TdC	Total	Source
1	(France) Christian Picard	1941–1975							
2	(France) Gérard Picard	1975–2003		1				1	
3	(France) Louis Nicollin	2003–2010		1	1			2	
4	(France) Jean-Paul Ouillon	2010–2012							
5	(Qatar) Nasser Al-Khelaifi	2012–Present	13		5	3	6	27	

=== Managers ===
Managers listed from 1984 onwards.

No.	President	Tenure	D1	D2	CdF	CdL	TdC	Total	Source
1	(France) Yann Blanchard	1984–1990		1				1	
2	(France) Patrice Canayer	1990–1994							
3	(North Macedonia) Risto Magdinčev	1994–1997							
4	(France) Nicolas Cochery	1997–2000							
5	(Bosnia and Herzegovina) Boro Golić	2000–2003							
6	(France) Maxime Spincer	2004, 2011							
7	(France) Thierry Anti	2004–2008			1			1	
8	(France) Olivier Girault	2008–2011		1				1	
9	(France) François Berthier	2011–2012							
10	(France) Philippe Gardent	2012–2015	2		2		1	5	
11	(Croatia) Zvonimir Serdarušić	2015–2018	3		1	2	2	8	
12	(Spain) Raúl González	2018–2025	7		2	1	2	12	
13	(Denmark) Stefan Madsen	2025–Present	1				1	2	
