= Mathieu Grébille =

French handball player (born 1991)

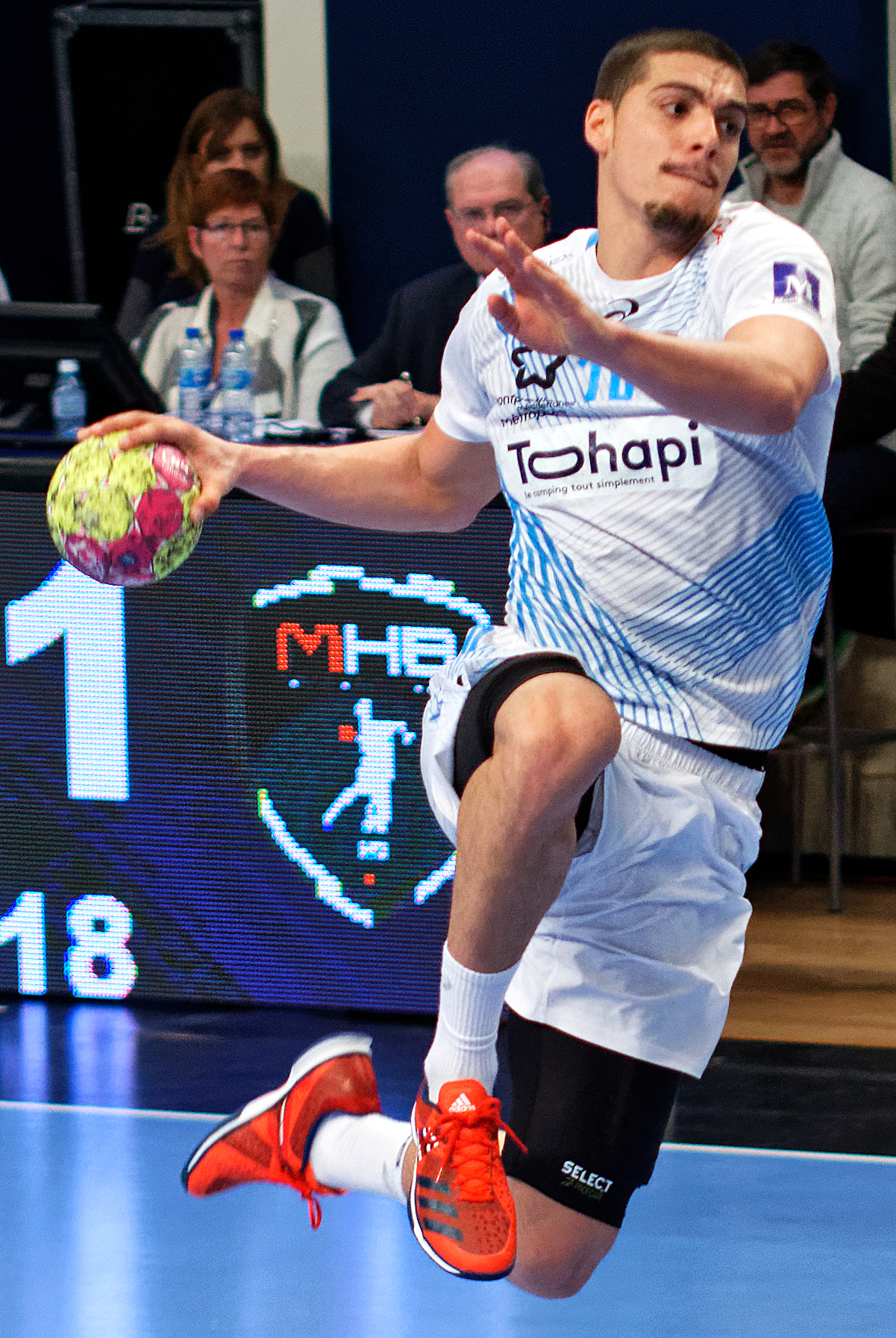

Personal information
- Nationality: French
- Born: 6 October 1991 (age 35) Paris, France
- Height: 1.98 m (6 ft 6 in)

Sport
- Sport: Handball
- Position: Left wing
- Current club: Paris Saint-Germain
- Number: 20

Youth career
- Years: Team
- 2002–2008: ASC Ducos Martinique
- 2008: Pôle espoir de Martinique
- 2008–2010: Montpellier Handball

Senior clubs
- Years: Team
- 2010–2020: Montpellier Handball
- 2020–: Paris Saint-Germain
National team
Years	Team	Apps	(Gls)
2012–	France	102	(148)
Medal record
Olympic Games
Silver medal – second place	2016 Rio de Janeiro	Team
World Championship
Gold medal – first place	2015 Qatar
Silver medal – second place	2023 Poland/Sweden
Bronze medal – third place	2019 Germany/Denmark
Bronze medal – third place	2025 Croatia/Denmark/Norway
European Championship
Gold medal – first place	2014 Denmark
- Updated on 8 February 2025

Mathieu Grébille (born 6 October 1991) is a French professional handball player for Paris Saint-Germain and the French national team.

== Career ==
Grébille started playing handball in 2002 at ASC Ducos Martinique. In 2008 he switched to French top club Montpellier Handball, where he debuted for the senior team in 2010. In his first season he won the French treble (league, cup, league cup).

In the summer of 2020 he joined league rivals Paris Saint-Germain. Here he won the French Championship 5 times in a row from 2021 to 2025.

== National Team ==
He debuted for the French national team on November 1st 2012 against Lithuania. His first major international tournament was the 2014 European Championship in Denmark, where he won gold medals with the French team.

At the 2016 Olympics he won silver medals with the French team, losing in the final to Denmark.

He participated at the 2019 World Men's Handball Championship, where France came in third.

In 2023 he won silver medals at the 2023 World Men's Handball Championship, losing to Denmark in the final. At the 2025 World Championship he won bronze medals with France, losing to Croatia in the semifinal and beating Portugal in the third place playoff.

== Titles ==
- French Championship: 2010, 2011, 2012, 2021, 2022, 2023, 2024, 2025, 2026
- Coupe de France: 2010, 2012, 2013, 2016, 2021, 2022
- Coupe de la Ligue: 2010, 2011, 2012, 2014, 2016
- Trophée des champions: 2010, 2011, 2018, 2023
