= 2018–19 LNH Division 1 =

LNH Division 1
- Season: 2018-19
- Champions: Paris Saint-Germain
- Matches played: 182
- Goals scored: 10,028 (55.1 per match)
- Top goalscorer: (France) Raphaël Caucheteux (179 goals)

The 2018–19 LNH Division 1 is the 67th season of the LNH Division 1, French premier handball league and the 42nd season consisting of only one league. It runs from 5 September 2018 to 5 June 2019.

== Team information ==
Locations of the 2017-18 LNH Division 1

The following 14 clubs compete in the LNH Division 1 during the 2018–19 season:

Team	Location	Arena	Capacity
Pays d'Aix Université Club	Aix-en-Provence	Complexe sportif du Val de l'Arc; Arena du Pays d'Aix	1,650; 6,004
Cesson-Rennes	Rennes	Palais des sports de la Valette; Le Liberté	1,400; 4,000
Chambéry	Chambéry	Le Phare	4,400
Dunkerque	Dunkerque	Stade des Flandres	2,400
US Ivry	Ivry-sur-Seine	Gymnase Auguste-Delaune	1,500
UMS Pontault-Combault HB	Pontault-Combault	Espace Boisramé	1,500
Montpellier	Montpellier	Palais des sports René-Bougnol; Sud de France Arena	3,000; 8,000
Nantes	Nantes	Palais des Sports; Halle XXL de la Beaujoire	5,000; 9,000
USAM Nîmes	Nîmes	Le Parnasse	3,391
Paris Saint-Germain	Paris	Stade Pierre de Coubertin; Halle Georges Carpentier	3,402; 4,300
Saint Raphaël	Saint-Raphaël	Palais des sports J-F Krakowski	2,000
Istres	Istres	Halle polyvalente	2,000
Fenix Toulouse	Toulouse	Palais des Sports André Brouat	4,200
Tremblay	Tremblay-en-France	Palais des sports	1,020

== League table ==
Pos	Team	Pld	W	D	L	GF	GA	GD	Pts	Qualification or relegation
1	Paris Saint-Germain	26	24	1	1	855	656	+199	49	Qualification to Champions League group stage
2	Montpellier Handball	26	21	1	4	740	666	+74	43	Qualification to Champions League group stage
3	Chambéry SMB	26	20	1	5	738	655	+83	41	Qualification to EHF Cup
4	HBC Nantes	26	19	1	6	800	710	+90	39	Qualification to EHF Cup
5	USAM Nîmes	26	17	2	7	747	720	+27	36	Qualification to EHF Cup
6	Pays d'Aix UC	26	14	0	12	697	666	+31	28	
7	Saint-Raphaël VHB	26	11	3	12	766	744	+22	25	
8	Fenix Toulouse Handball	26	10	3	13	757	763	−6	23	
9	Tremblay-en-France Handball	26	9	4	13	712	774	−62	22	
10	Dunkerque HGL	26	8	3	15	639	663	−24	19	
11	Istres Provence Handball	26	6	2	18	676	756	−80	14	
12	US Ivry	26	4	2	20	653	741	−88	10	
13	Cesson Rennes MHB	26	3	3	20	599	727	−128	9	Relegation to 2018–19 LNH Division 2
14	Pontault-Combault Handball	26	3	0	23	649	787	−138	6	Relegation to 2018–19 LNH Division 2

Updated to match(es) played on 27 July 2020. Source: lnh.fr/lidl-starligue
Rules for classification: 1) Points; 2) Head-to-head goal difference; 3) Head-to-head goals scored.
