= 2010–11 LNH Division 1 =

LNH Division 1
- Season: 2010–11
- Champions: Montpellier
- Relegated: Cesson & Dijon

2010–11 Ligue Nationale de Handball Division 1 season was the 59th since its establishment. Montpellier were the defending champions, having won their title the previous season.

== Team information ==
2010–11 teams

Club	Arena	Capacity
Chambéry SH	Le Phare	4 500
USAM Nîmes	Le Parnasse	3 391
Toulouse Union	Palais des Sports André Brouat	3 751
Dijon Bourgogne HB	Palais des Sports JM Geoffroy	4 000
Montpellier AHB	Palais des sports René Bougnol; Arena Montpellier	3 000; 8 500
Dunkerque HBGL	Salle Dewerdt	2 500
Istres OPH	Halle polyvalente	2 000
Saint-Raphaël Var HB	Palais des Sports Intercommunal	2 000
HBC Nantes	Complexe sportif Mangin Beaulieu; Palais des Sports de Beaulieu	2 900; 5 000
US Ivry Handball	Gymnase Auguste Delaune	1 500
OC Cesson	Palais des Sports de la Valette	1 400
Tremblay en France	Palais des sports de Tremblay-en-France	1 200
Saint-Cyr Touraine	Complexe Sportif Guy Drut	1 200

== League table ==
EHF Champions League
EHF Cup
EHF Cup Winners' Cup
Relegated

#	Team	MP	W	D	L	F	A	Dff	Pts
1	Montpellier AHB	26	25	0	1	847	660	+187	50
2	Chambéry Savoie	26	22	0	4	805	701	+104	44
3	Dunkerque	26	18	1	7	789	732	+57	37
4	Saint Raphaël	26	12	6	8	740	722	+18	30
5	HBC Nantes	26	14	2	10	756	723	+33	30
6	Istres HB	26	13	1	12	701	711	-10	27
7	Tremblay HB	26	11	4	11	654	684	-30	26
8	Saint Cyr Touraine	26	10	0	16	706	767	-61	20
9	Toulouse Union	26	7	4	15	703	762	-59	18
10	USAM Nîmes	26	8	2	16	639	666	-27	18
11	Paris HB	26	7	3	16	691	729	-38	17
12	US Ivry	26	7	2	17	689	758	-69	16
13	OC Cesson	26	6	4	16	658	696	-38	16
14	Dijon	26	6	3	17	673	740	-67	15

- source:scoresway.com
