= 2017–18 LNH Division 1 =

LNH Division 1
- Season: 2017-18
- Champions: Paris Saint-Germain
- Matches played: 182
- Goals scored: 10,208 (56.09 per match)
- Top goalscorer: (France) Raphaël Caucheteux (167 goals)

The 2017–18 LNH Division 1 is the 66th season of the LNH Division 1, French premier handball league and the 41st season consisting of only one league. It runs from 13 September 2017 to 30 May 2018.

== Team information ==
Locations of the 2017-18 LNH Division 1

The following 14 clubs compete in the LNH Division 1 during the 2017–18 season:

| Team | Location | Arena | Capacity |
|---|---|---|---|
| Pays d'Aix Université Club | Aix-en-Provence | Complexe sportif du Val de l'Arc; Arena du Pays d'Aix | 1,650; 6,004 |
| Cesson-Rennes | Rennes | Palais des sports de la Valette; Le Liberté | 1,400; 4,000 |
| Chambéry | Chambéry | Le Phare | 4,400 |
| Dunkerque | Dunkerque | Stade des Flandres | 2,400 |
| US Ivry | Ivry-sur-Seine | Gymnase Auguste-Delaune | 1,500 |
| Massy Essonne Handball | Massy | Centre omnisports Pierre-de-Coubertin; Gymnase Mares-Yvon | 800; 2,000 |
| Montpellier | Montpellier | Palais des sports René-Bougnol; Sud de France Arena | 3,000; 8,000 |
| Nantes | Nantes | Palais des Sports; Halle XXL de la Beaujoire | 5,000; 9,000 |
| USAM Nîmes | Nîmes | Le Parnasse | 3,391 |
| Paris Saint-Germain | Paris | Stade Pierre de Coubertin; Halle Georges Carpentier | 3,402; 4,300 |
| Saint Raphaël | Saint-Raphaël | Palais des sports J-F Krakowski | 2,000 |
| Saran | Saran | Halle du Bois Joly | 1,440 |
| Fenix Toulouse | Toulouse | Palais des Sports André Brouat | 4,200 |
| Tremblay | Tremblay-en-France | Palais des sports | 1,020 |

== League table ==
| Pos | Team | Pld | W | D | L | GF | GA | GD | Pts | Qualification or relegation |
|---|---|---|---|---|---|---|---|---|---|---|
| 1 | Paris Saint-Germain | 26 | 22 | 1 | 3 | 855 | 656 | +199 | 45 | Qualification to Champions League group stage |
| 2 | Montpellier | 26 | 22 | 1 | 3 | 767 | 642 | +125 | 45 | Qualification to Champions League group stage |
| 3 | HBC Nantes | 26 | 17 | 3 | 6 | 814 | 726 | +88 | 37 | Qualification to EHF Cup |
| 4 | Saint Raphaël | 26 | 15 | 4 | 7 | 734 | 695 | +39 | 34 | Qualification to EHF Cup |
| 5 | Aix | 26 | 15 | 3 | 8 | 748 | 712 | +36 | 33 | Qualification to EHF Cup |
| 6 | Dunkerque | 26 | 15 | 2 | 9 | 689 | 687 | +2 | 32 | |
| 7 | Toulouse | 26 | 13 | 1 | 12 | 777 | 785 | −8 | 27 | |
| 8 | USAM Nîmes | 26 | 12 | 3 | 11 | 729 | 713 | +16 | 27 | |
| 9 | Chambéry | 26 | 10 | 3 | 13 | 717 | 732 | −15 | 23 | |
| 10 | Ivry | 26 | 10 | 3 | 13 | 653 | 742 | −89 | 23 | |
| 11 | Tremblay | 26 | 6 | 2 | 18 | 743 | 789 | −46 | 14 | |
| 12 | Cesson-Rennes | 26 | 4 | 5 | 17 | 666 | 732 | −66 | 13 | |
| 13 | Saran | 26 | 5 | 2 | 19 | 757 | 839 | −82 | 12 | Relegation to 2018–19 LNH Division 2 |
| 14 | Massy | 26 | 2 | 2 | 22 | 618 | 740 | −122 | 6 | Relegation to 2018–19 LNH Division 2 |

Updated to match(es) played on 26 january 2018. Source: lnh.fr/lidl-starligue
Rules for classification: 1) Points; 2) Goal difference; 3) Goals scored.

=== Schedule and results ===
In the table below the home teams are listed on the left and the away teams along the top.

| | AIX | CES | CHA | DUN | IVR | MAS | MON | NAN | NIM | PSG | STR | SAR | TOU | TRE |
|---|---|---|---|---|---|---|---|---|---|---|---|---|---|---|
| Aix | | 31-32 | 29-28 | 27-32 | 30-25 | 33-19 | 28-32 | 28-28 | 29-23 | 33-31 | 29-29 | 36-29 | 29-30 | 28-25 |
| Cesson-Rennes | 16-19 | | 22-30 | 21-25 | 26-26 | 28-23 | 23-28 | 27-33 | 23-24 | 28-34 | 27-28 | 29-30 | 28-32 | 30-30 |
| Chambéry | 29-30 | 32-24 | | 26-26 | 29-23 | 27-24 | 21-30 | 25-29 | 28-28 | 24-32 | 24-28 | 33-24 | 23-27 | 33-29 |
| Dunkerque | 30-31 | 22-21 | 26-23 | | 25-22 | 24-21 | 23-24 | 30-22 | 27-30 | 22-27 | 30-26 | 28-22 | 24-32 | 37-32 |
| Ivry | 21-28 | 19-26 | 24-22 | 26-29 | | 24-24 | 22-25 | 30-29 | 29-26 | 24-31 | 25-31 | 32-27 | 28-32 | 24-29 |
| Massy | 30-36 | 21-21 | 31-32 | 20-23 | 24-28 | | 15-21 | 22-28 | 29-23 | 24-27 | 25-36 | 25-23 | 26-30 | 20-29 |
| Montpellier | 22-23 | 33-27 | 29-18 | 33-25 | 36-22 | 32-23 | | 33-28 | 33-30 | 33-30 | 28-28 | 32-29 | 36-25 | 28-25 |
| Nantes | 29-24 | 38-30 | 28-32 | 31-15 | 31-22 | 41-35 | 27-30 | | 33-25 | 27-27 | 31-27 | 31-29 | 32-28 | 36-31 |
| Nîmes | 25-25 | 29-18 | 25-31 | 31-25 | 29-25 | 27-25 | 24-28 | 29-29 | | 26-24 | 25-26 | 30-23 | 33-35 | 30-21 |
| Paris | 33-22 | 32-25 | 30-26 | 32-29 | 30-22 | 33-17 | 26-19 | 31-29 | 30-29 | | 27-25 | 40-31 | 38-30 | 25-23 |
| Saint Raphaël | 32-28 | 25-24 | 30-24 | 23-23 | 35-25 | 25-21 | 26-25 | 25-26 | 31-35 | 25-26 | | 27-27 | 27-23 | 32-28 |
| Saran | 35-37 | 29-29 | 41-33 | 32-33 | 27-29 | 32-27 | 29-34 | 30-39 | 20-29 | 28-36 | 27-28 | | 34-33 | 39-37 |
| Toulouse | 26-25 | 30-30 | 32-33 | 25-28 | 35-29 | 31-24 | 26-34 | 28-34 | 27-29 | 27-34 | 34-29 | 37-35 | | 31-29 |
| Tremblay | 21-30 | 29-32 | 31-31 | 27-28 | 26-27 | 26-23 | 19-29 | 33-45 | 39-35 | 26-30 | 29-30 | 35-25 | 34-31 | |

== Season statistics ==
=== Top goalscorers ===
As of 30 May 2018

| Rank | Player | Club | Goals |
|---|---|---|---|
| 1 | (France) Raphaël Caucheteux | Saint Raphaël | 167 |
| 2 | (Serbia) Nemanja Ilić | Toulouse | 146 |
| 3 | (France) Matthieu Drouhin | Saran | 140 |
| 4 | (Montenegro) Fahrudin Melić | Chambéry | 137 |
| 5 | (France) Baptiste Butto | Dunkerque | 133 |
| 6 | (Denmark) Mikkel Hansen | Paris Saint-Germain | 127 |
| 7 | (Spain) David Balaguer | Nantes | 123 |
| 8 | (France) Nicolas Tournat | Nantes | 117 |
| 9 | (Germany) Uwe Gensheimer | Paris Saint-Germain | 115 |
| 10 | (France) Jean-Jacques Acquevillo | Saran | 112 |

=== Monthly awards ===
| Month | Player of the Month | |
| Month | Player | Club |
|---|---|---|
| September | (France) Vincent Gérard | Montpellier |
| October | (France) Julien Rebichon | Nîmes |
| November | (France) Valentin Porte | Montpellier |
| December | (France) Valentin Porte | Montpellier |
| February | (Spain) David Balaguer | Nantes |
| March | (France) Melvyn Richardson | Montpellier |
| April | (France) Melvyn Richardson | Montpellier |
| May | (France) Baptiste Butto | Dunkerque |
