= 2016–17 LNH Division 1 =

LNH Division 1
- Season: 2016-17
- Champions: Paris Saint-Germain
- Relegated: US Créteil; Sélestat
- EHF Champions League: Paris Saint-Germain; Nantes; Montpellier
- EHF Cup: Chambéry; Saint Raphaël
- Matches played: 182
- Goals scored: 10,460 (57.47 per match)
- Top goalscorer: (Germany) Uwe Gensheimer (167 goals)

The 2016–17 LNH Division 1 is the 65th season of the LNH Division 1, French premier handball league and the 40th season consisting of only one league. It runs from 21 September 2016 to 8 June 2017.

== Team information ==
Locations of the 2016-17 LNH Division 1

The following 14 clubs compete in the LNH Division 1 during the 2016–17 season:

Team	Location	Arena	Capacity
Aix	Aix-en-Provence	Complexe sportif du Val de l'Arc	1,650
Cesson-Rennes	Rennes	Palais des sports de la Valette; Le Liberté	1,400; 4,000
Chambéry	Chambéry	Le Phare	4,400
US Créteil	Créteil	Palais des Sports Robert Oubron	2,500
Dunkerque	Dunkerque	Stade des Flandres	2,400
US Ivry	Ivry-sur-Seine	Gymnase Auguste-Delaune	1,500
Montpellier	Montpellier	Palais des sports René-Bougnol; Park&Suites Arena	3,000; 8,000
Nantes	Nantes	Palais des Sports; Halle XXL de la Beaujoire	5,000; 9,000
USAM Nîmes	Nîmes	Le Parnasse	3,391
Paris Saint-Germain	Paris	Stade Pierre de Coubertin; Halle Georges Carpentier	3,402; 4,300
Saint Raphaël	Saint-Raphaël	Palais des sports J-F Krakowski	2,000
Saran	Saran	Halle du Bois Joly	1,440
Sélestat	Sélestat	CSI Sélestat; Rhénus Sport	2,300; 5,500
Fenix Toulouse	Toulouse	Palais des Sports André Brouat	4,200

== League table ==
Pos	Team	Pld	W	D	L	GF	GA	GD	Pts	Qualification or relegation
1	Paris Saint-Germain	26	24	0	2	899	729	+170	48	Qualification to Champions League group stage
2	HBC Nantes	26	22	1	3	843	732	+111	45	Qualification to Champions League group stage
3	Montpellier	26	20	0	6	848	704	+144	40	Qualification to Champions League group stage
4	Saint Raphaël	26	16	3	7	746	691	+55	35	Qualification to EHF Cup
5	Chambéry	26	13	0	13	727	702	+25	26	Qualification to EHF Cup
6	Dunkerque	26	12	2	12	699	711	−12	26	
7	Toulouse	26	11	3	12	749	779	−30	25	
8	Aix	26	10	2	14	761	769	−8	22	
9	Ivry	26	9	4	13	705	740	−35	22	
10	USAM Nîmes	26	10	2	14	703	733	−30	22	
11	Cesson-Rennes	26	6	4	16	681	748	−67	16	
12	Saran	26	6	4	16	745	845	−100	16	
13	Créteil	26	7	2	17	738	815	−77	16	Relegation to 2017–18 LNH Division 2
14	Sélestat	26	2	1	23	616	762	−146	5	Relegation to 2017–18 LNH Division 2

Source: lnh.fr/lidl-starligue
Rules for classification: 1) Points; 2) Goal difference; 3) Goals scored.

=== Schedule and results ===
In the table below the home teams are listed on the left and the away teams along the top.

	AIX	CES	CHA	CRÉ	DUN	IVR	MON	NAN	NIM	PSG	STR	SAR	SEL	TOU
Aix		34–25	25–32	32–22	31–35	28–30	22–31	33–38	32–27	28–30	29–29	27–30	33–28	38–35
Cesson-Rennes	31–34		22–33	33–23	23–22	31–26	28–37	27–33	24–24	22–28	25–22	26–25	22–24	26–26
Chambéry	27–25	27–25		29–30	29–20	29–25	32–34	33–30	17–22	26–33	28–23	26–28	36–23	30–29
Créteil	27–27	28–27	31–29		31–34	29–29	24–32	26–32	25–29	28–29	31–37	35–36	30–24	27–29
Dunkerque	27–21	27–25	24–22	34–30		31–20	26–31	26–34	23–23	27–37	27–23	27–29	29–21	24–24
Ivry	23–28	27–27	27–24	27–28	28–21		30–29	29–30	33–23	21–31	21–28	35–31	27–22	32–28
Montpellier	36–32	35–28	29–25	35–27	38–26	32–27		25–26	37–30	33–34	33–25	42–28	31–20	31–29
Nantes	34–28	29–25	30–27	35–29	27–23	30–30	30–33		29–33	37–31	38–33	34–25	40–29	42–27
Nîmes	25–29	30–24	23–25	30–26	26–23	29–27	21–34	31–34		33–36	26–28	25–28	31–20	22–27
Paris	34–32	41–28	31–25	39–32	36–29	40–26	31–25	37–38	37–23		28–24	30–29	38–25	42–31
Saint Raphaël	31–29	29–29	30–25	39–28	26–21	27–21	27–26	23–21	29–25	29–32		30–30	25–18	31–25
Saran	26–28	30–26	33–36	32–37	23–37	32–32	20–37	27–31	31–39	32–44	27–44		28–28	28–29
Sélestat	28–29	19–21	20–27	26–27	24–26	24–25	27–34	19–27	22–25	19–32	24–28	30–27		26–32
Toulouse	28–27	35–31	30–28	30–27	29–30	28–27	28–32	24–30	33–28	27–38	24–26	30–30	32–26	

== Season statistics ==
=== Top goalscorers ===
Rank	Player	Club	Goals
1	(Germany) Uwe Gensheimer	Paris Saint-Germain	167
2	(France) Hugo Descat	Créteil	158
3	(Denmark) Morten Vium	Ivry	152
4	(France) Raphaël Caucheteux	Saint Raphaël	150
5	(Spain) David Balaguer	Nantes	139
6	(Slovenia) Jure Dolenec	Montpellier	132
7	(Montenegro) Fahrudin Melić	Chambéry	130
7	(Serbia) Nemanja Ilić	Toulouse	130
9	(Iceland) Snorri Stein Guðjónsson	Nîmes	127
10	(France) Nicolas Claire	Nantes	125

=== Monthly awards ===
Month	Player of the Month	
Month	Player	Club
September	(France) Jean-Jacques Acquevillo	Saran Loiret HB
October	(France) Matthieu Drouhin	Saran Loiret HB
November	(France) Nicolas Claire	HBC Nantes
December	(France) Cyril Dumoulin	HBC Nantes
February	(France) Jean-Loup Faustin	Montpellier Handball
March	(France) Hugo Descat	US Créteil
April	(Slovenia) Jure Dolenec	Montpellier Handball
May	(Spain) David Balaguer	HBC Nantes
