= Ibrahima Diaw =

Ibrahima Diaw may refer to:

- Ibrahim Diaw, or Ibrahima, French-born Senegalese handballer
- Ibrahima Diaw (table tennis), Senegalese table tennis player
