= Coupe de la Ligue (men's handball) =

French handball tournament

The Coupe de la Ligue was an annual League cup competition for French men's handball professional clubs. Organized by the Ligue Nationale de Handball, it first took place in 2002. He was run by the French Handball Federation for the two first years, and in 2004 the Ligue Nationale de Handball took over until it was cancelled in 2022.

Montpellier Handball is the competition's most successful club as of 2019 with ten titles, followed by Paris Saint-Germain Handball with three.

In the 2019-2020 the tournament was cancelled at the semifinals, and in the 2020-2021 season, it was cancelled outright. It came back for a single season in 2021-2022, but was ultimately scrapped to lighten the schedule in French handball.

== Champions ==
=== Winners by season ===
Year	Champion	Runner-up	Score	Location
2001-2002	SO Chambéry	Dunkerque HBGL	25 – 19	Cosec Eugène Griesmar, Sélestat
2002-2003	US Créteil	Montpellier Handball	27 – 23	Palais des Sports, Besançon
2003-2004	Montpellier Handball	US Créteil	26 – 23	Stade des Flandres, Dunkerque
2004-2005	Montpellier Handball (2)	Paris Handball	27 – 21	Le Parnasse, Nîmes
2005-2006	Montpellier Handball (3)	Paris Handball	31 – 30	Gymnase Pierre Charpy, Paris
2006-2007	Montpellier Handball (4)	US Ivry	34 – 33	Les Arènes, Metz
2007-2008	Montpellier AHB (5)	US Créteil	26 – 23	Halle olympique, Albertville
2008-2009	Istres OPH	Montpellier AHB	22 – 20	AmericanAirlines Arena, Miami (United States)
2009-2010	Montpellier AHB (6)	Saint-Raphaël VHB	37 – 25	Palais des Sports de Beaulieu, Nantes
2010-2011	Montpellier AHB (7)	Chambéry SH	32 – 29	Palais des Sports, Pau
2011-2012	Montpellier AHB (8)	Saint-Raphaël VHB	28 – 27	Palais des Sports de Beaulieu, Nantes
2012-2013	US Dunkerque HBGL	HBC Nantes	28 – 24	Palais des sports André-Brouat, Toulouse
2013-2014	Montpellier AHB (9)	Saint-Raphaël VHB	34 – 21	Le Phare, Chambéry
2014-2015	HBC Nantes	Fenix Toulouse	23 – 20	Kindarena, Rouen
2015-2016	Montpellier Handball (10)	Paris Saint-Germain Handball	31 – 26	Arena Montpellier, Montpellier
2016-2017	Paris Saint-Germain (1)	HBC Nantes	31 – 27	Complexe René-Tys, Reims
2017-2018	Paris Saint-Germain (2)	Fenix Toulouse Handball	40 – 30	Les Arènes, Metz
2018-2019	Paris Saint-Germain (3)	Montpellier Handball	31 – 25	Antarès, Le Mans
2019-2020	cancelled in semi-finals due to COVID-19 pandemic			
2020-2021	cancelled due to COVID-19 pandemic			
2021-2022	HBC Nantes (2)	Chambéry Savoie	28 – 21	Les Arènes, Metz

=== Performances ===
#	Club	Winner		Runner-up	
#	Club	Nb	Years	Nb	Years
1	Montpellier Handball	10	2004, 2005, 2006, 2007, 2008, 2010, 2011, 2012, 2014, 2016	3	2003, 2009, 2019
2	Paris Saint-Germain Handball	3	2017, 2018, 2019	3	2005, 2006, 2016
3	HBC Nantes (T)	2	2015, 2022	2	2013, 2017
4	US Créteil Handball	1	2003	2	2004, 2008
4	Chambéry Savoie Mont-Blanc Handball	1	2002	2	2011, 2022
6	Dunkerque Handball Grand Littoral	1	2013	1	2002
7	Istres Ouest Provence Handball	1	2009	0	-
8	Saint-Raphaël Var Handball	0	-	3	2010, 2012, 2014
9	Fenix Toulouse Handball	0	-	2	2015, 2018
10	US Ivry Handball	0	-	1	2007
-	Cancelled	2	2020, 2021	2	2020, 2021
Total		21	2002-2022	21	2002-2022

Legend : 10 cups won; (T) : title holder

== See also ==
- LNH
- Division 1
- Coupe de France
- Trophée des Champions
- Coupe de la Ligue (women)
