= Benoît Kounkoud =

French handball player (born 1997)

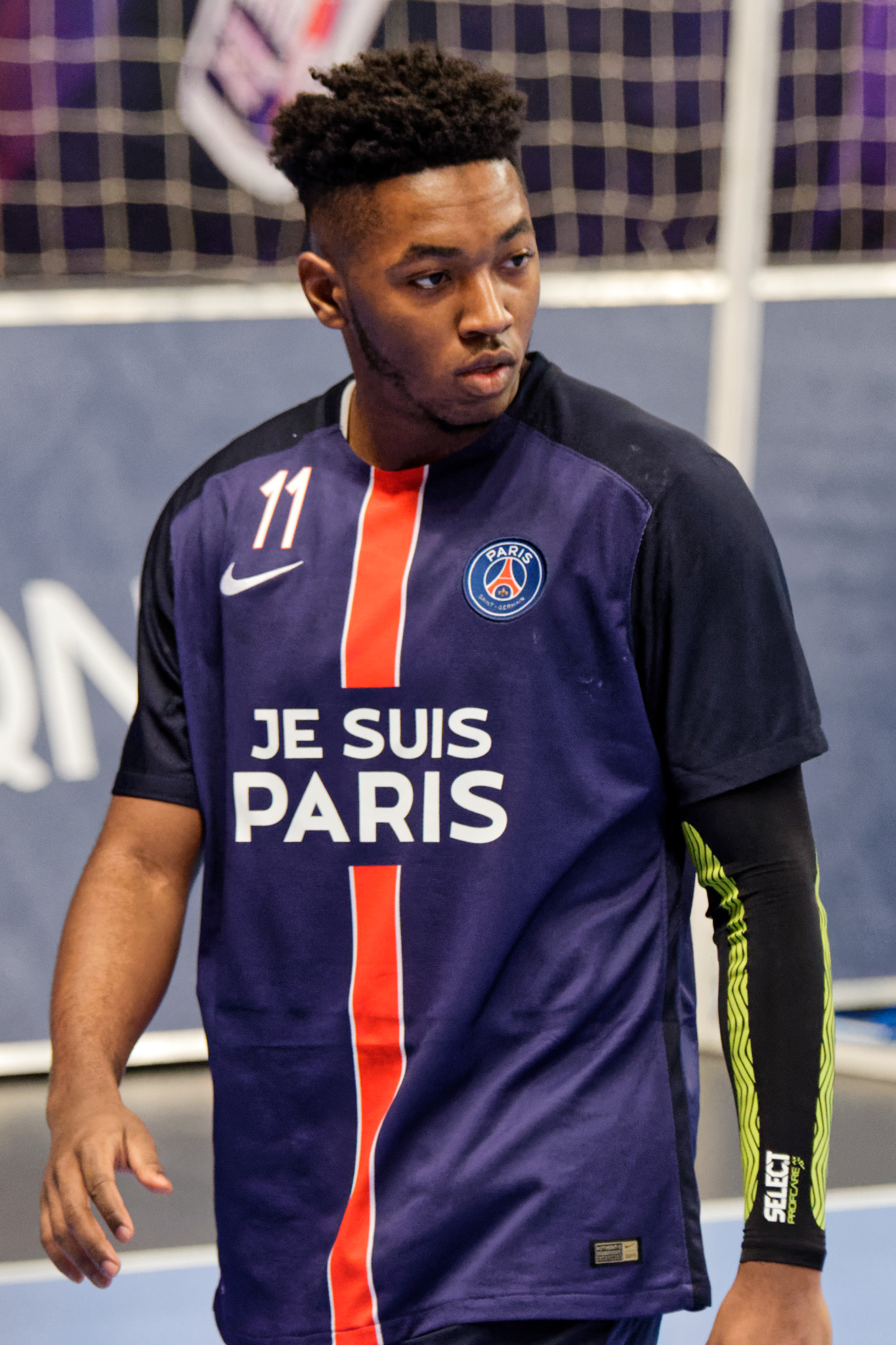

Personal information
- Nationality: French
- Born: 19 February 1997 (age 29) Versailles, France
- Height: 1.88 m (6 ft 2 in)

Sport
- Sport: Handball
- Position: Right wing
- Current club: Industria Kielce
- Number: 11

Senior clubs
- Years: Team
- 2014–2022: Paris Saint-Germain
- 2022–: Industria Kielce
National team
Years	Team	Apps	(Gls)
2015–	France	65	(95)
Medal record
World Championship
Bronze medal – third place	2025 Croatia/Denmark/Norway
European Championship
Gold medal – first place	2024 Germany
Youth World Championship
Gold medal – first place	2015 Russia
- Updated on 14 January 2026

Benoît Kounkoud (born 19 February 1997) is a French handball player for Industria Kielce and the French national team.

He participated at the 2016 European Men's Handball Championship.

At the 2025 World Championship he won bronze medals with France, losing to Croatia in the semifinal and beating Portugal in the third place playoff.
