= Louis Nicollin =

French entrepreneur

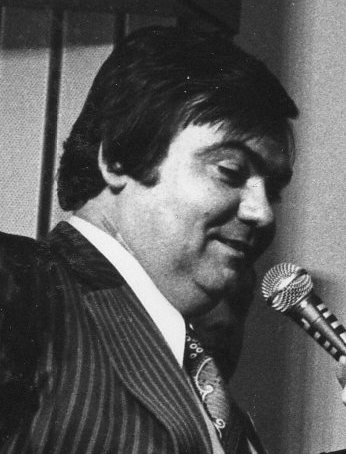
- Louis Nicollin at the draw for the 1978–79 Coupe de France
- Born: 29 June 1943; Valence, France
- Died: 29 June 2017 (aged 74); Nîmes, France
- Occupations: Owner of Montpellier HSC and Le Groupe Nicollin (waste collection company)
- Spouse: Colette Nicollin
- Children: 2

Louis Nicollin (29 June 1943 – 29 June 2017) was a French entrepreneur and director of the Nicollin Company, which specializes in the collection and reprocessing of household and industrial waste. Nicollin notably served as chairman of Montpellier Hérault Sport Club, a football team, from 1974 to his death in 2017.

== Early life ==
Nicollin was born in Valence, capital of the Drôme department. As a young man he worked in the family business of waste collection.

== Business career ==
In 1974, he became chairman of the amateur football club Montpellier Paillade Sport Club, which played in the division d'honneur. Under his leadership, and the support of Mayor Georges Frêche, the club grew and was promoted to Ligue 1 within eight years.

He became the manager in 1977 and developed its activity mainly in Montpellier, before spreading the company around France and creating overseas departments. The company has operations in Belgium and Morocco. It took the name of Montpellier Hérault Sport Club (MHSC) in 1989, the same year Nicollin became the sole shareholder. Under his leadership, the club of Montpellier has won the championship of Ligue 2 in 1987, the Coupe de France in 1990, and Ligue 1 in 2012.

Nicollin not only invested in football, but also in other sports. In rugby, the Nicollin Company was the main sponsor of the AS Béziers Hérault from 1999 to 2009. In 2009, through a holding in his name, Nicollin became a shareholder in Montpellier Hérault Rugby Club. In 2000, he bought Paris Basket Racing and in 2002 Paris Handball. He placed his associates, including Jean-Claude Lemoult, in charge of the teams. He is also president of the Fédération Française de Joute et Sauvetage Nautique (FFJSN), a regulatory group for water jousting.

His responsibilities and his image in the sports world raised Nicollin's profile among local officials, which helped him win new waste collection contracts for the Nicollin Company. He was a member of the Club des Cinquante (Club of Fifty), a fraternal organization, as well as the Masonic Lodge of Montpellier, which is affiliated with the Grand Orient de France. Nicollin was the 354th richest man in France at the time of his death.

On 15 April 2012, Nicollin told TF1 that he would dye his hair in a fauxhawk style, in orange and blue—the colours of Montpellier HSC—if the club won the 2012 Ligue 1 trophy. The following month, under his presidency, Montpellier secured its first Ligue 1 title, a landmark achievement in French football. On 24 May 2012, he honoured his promise by colouring his hair in the club’s colours during the title celebrations.

Nicollin remained president of the club until his death on 29 June 2017, which coincided with his 74th birthday. He was succeeded by his son, Laurent Nicollin, who assumed the role of club president.

=== Groupe Nicollin ===
In addition to his football interests, Louis Nicollin oversaw the growth of Groupe Nicollin, a company initially founded by his father in 1945 that specializes in household and industrial waste collection, recycling, urban sanitation, industrial cleaning, and water management. Under his leadership from 1977 until his death in 2017, the group expanded from a regional waste collection operation into a national environmental services provider. As of 2022–2023, the company employed approximately 9,000 staff and generated annual revenues of around €550 million, with more than 60% of its business stemming from public sector contracts across roughly 300 municipal and institutional clients. The group also diversified into water services (such as sewage system maintenance and wastewater treatment) and industrial services including security, hygiene products, and building maintenance.

== Personal life ==
Nicollin had a large collection of football jerseys. The collection comprised around 4500 pieces, some of which belonged to football legends.

He was married to Colette, with whom he has two sons Oliver (42 years) and Laurent (39), who both work within the company and the club. His younger son Laurent is the Chairman of Montpellier HSC.

== Death ==
Nicollin died on his 74th birthday on 29 June 2017 of a heart attack in Nîmes, France.

== Controversies ==
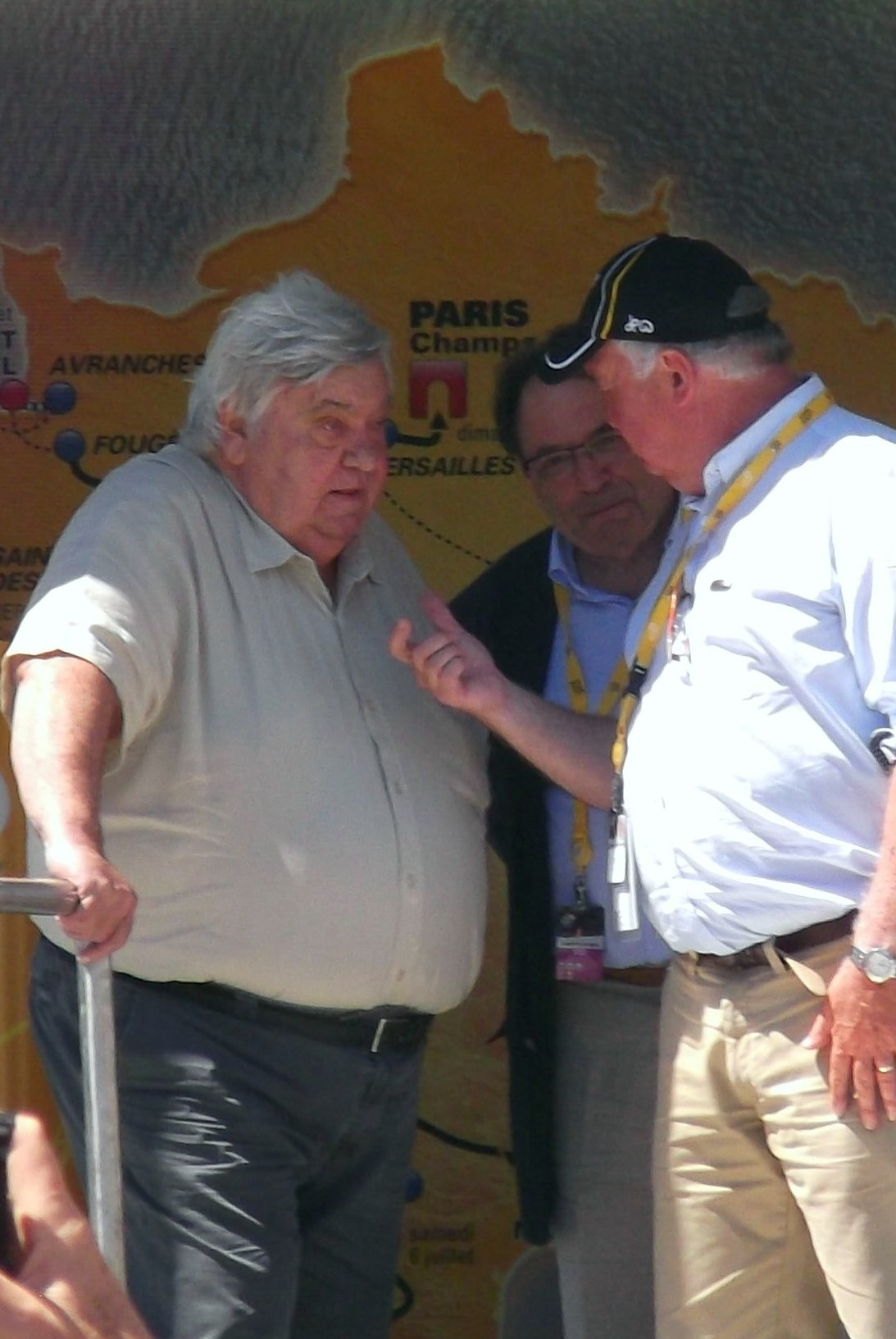
Louis Nicollin (2013).

Nicollin was known in the world of French football for his explosive temperament, marked by frequent verbal blunders and outbursts. On 31 October 2009, he called Benoit Pedretti, captain of AJ Auxerre (to whom Montpellier had just lost), a petit tarlouze, a highly offensive term for a gay man. Nicollin insinuated Pedretti would be treated badly at the next match between the teams. The next day, the Collective Against Homophobia (CCH) asked the Ligue de Football Professionnel (LFP) for sanctions against Louis Nicollin, who apologized the day after. Subsequently, the National Council of Ethics gave Nicollin a four-month ban from official duties, saying his comments were "discriminatory and threatening".

On 15 May 2010, following the club's qualification for the 3rd qualifying round of the Europa League, he bragged to Canal +: "The role of idiot is not for us, it is for Mr. Triaud and Mr. de Tavernost (directors of the Bordeaux football club, Ligue 1 champions 2009), and that, that makes me laugh."

On 30 December 2011, the newspaper L'Équipe reported Nicollin's comments about Carlo Ancelotti, coach of Paris Saint-Germain. "I prefer Courbis to Ancelotti! [...] The greatest coaches are those who win titles with half-good players. Courbis went up in Ligue 1 coaching half-retarded players."

On 17 April 2012, barely a month after he was awarded the Pierre Guenin prize for working against homophobia, he lost the prize and its reward of 2,000 euros as a result of a homophobic insult said on Radio Monte Carlo.

On 28 July 2012, Nicollin mocked A.C. Milan's Vice president and CEO Adriano Galliani calling him Kojak:

Kojak never called me", Nicollin told Canal+. "This makes me laugh. Those guys just got out of bed. They sold a guy for €45 million euros (Thiago Silva to PSG) and they want to steal one of ours ... If they offered €25m or €30m then fair enough, but from what I understood, they merely come in with €5m or €6m. (Galliani should) go play in movies and not hassle us."
