= Olivier Girault =

French handball player (born 1973)

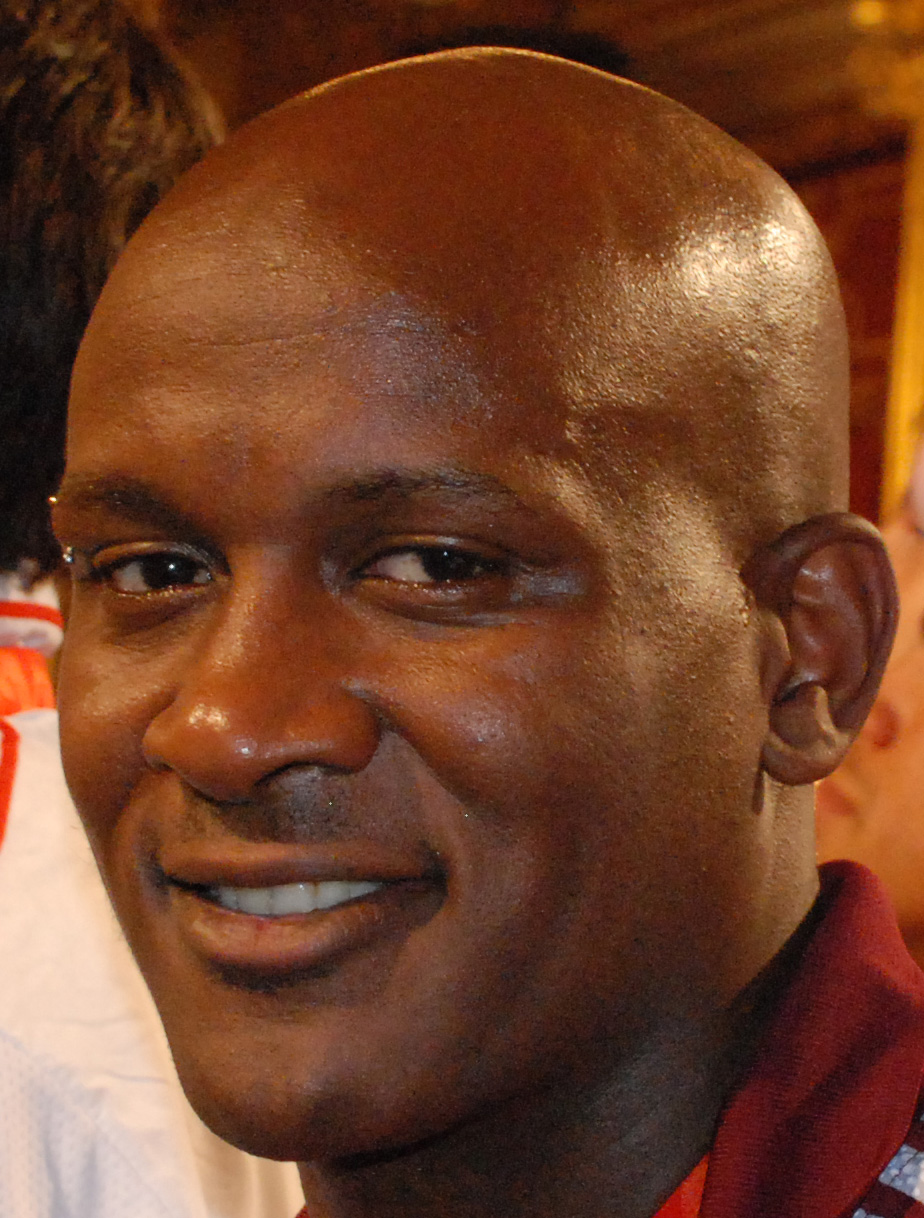
- Girault in 2008

Personal information
- Full name: Olivier Damien Girault
- Nationality: French
- Born: 22 February 1973 (age 53) Pointe-à-Pitre, Guadeloupe, French West Indies
- Height: 1.83 m (6 ft 0 in)

Sport
- Sport: Handball
- Position: Left back

Youth career
- Years: Team
- 1986–1990: Vaires-sur-Marne
- 1990–1994: Livry-Gargan handball

Senior clubs
- Years: Team
- 1994–1995: Livry-Gargan handball
- 1995–1998: Massy Essonne HB
- 1998–1999: Bidasoa Irun
- 1999–2010: Paris HB
National team
| Years | Team | Apps | (Gls) |
| 1997–2008 | France | 231 | (527) |

Teams managed
- 2008–2011: Paris HB
Medal record
Men's handball
Representing France
Olympic Games
| Gold medal – first place | 2008 Beijing | Team competition |
World Championships
| Gold medal – first place | 2001 France | Team competition |
European Championships
| Gold medal – first place | 2006 Switzerland | Team competition |
Mediterranean Games
| Bronze medal – third place | 2001 Tunis | Team competition |

Olivier Damien Girault (born 22 February 1973) is former French team handball player and coach. He retired as a field player in 2008 after the victory of the France men's national handball team (of which he was the captain) at the Beijing Olympics. From 2008 to 2011 he was the head coach of Paris HB.

He won all three major championships with the national team: world championship in 2001, European championship in 2006 and olympic champion in 2008, as mentioned above.

He also regularly works as a commentator and consultant on sports events for France Télévisions.

He was the president of National Handball League from 2018 till 2020.

== Clubs ==
- Vaires-sur-Marne
- Livry-Gargan handball
- Massy Essonne HB
- CD Bidasoa
- Paris Handball

== Honors ==
Club

- 2007 : Winner of French Cup
- 2008 : 2nd of the French Cup

National team

- World Cup : 2001
- European Men's Handball Championship : 2006
