= Sameh Abdel Waress =

Egyptian handball player

Personal information
- Nationality: Egyptian
- Born: 3 August 1971 (age 55)
- Height: 197 cm (78 in)

Sport
- Sport: Handball
- Position: Right back

Senior clubs
- Years: Team
- 1989-1997: al Ahly Cairo
- 1997-1999: PSG-Asnières
- 1999-?: al Ahly Cairo
National team
- Years: Team
- –: Egypt

Sameh Abdel Waress Muhammad in arabic: سامح عبد الوارث (born 3 August 1971) is an Egyptian handball player. He competed in the 1996 Summer Olympics.
