= Júlíus Jónasson =

Icelandic handball player

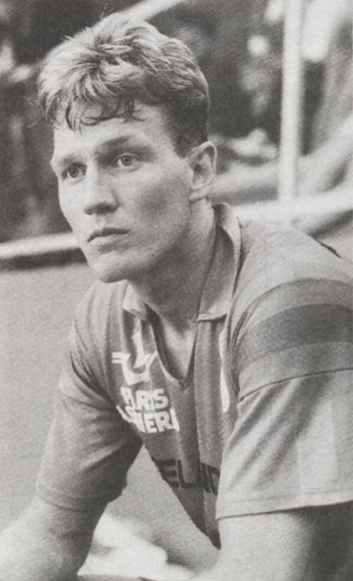
- Júlíus Jónasson in 1990.

Personal information
- Nationality: Icelandic
- Born: 22 August 1964 (age 62)

Sport
- Sport: Handball
- Position: Right back
- Number: 15

Senior clubs
- Years: Team
- –1989: Valur Reykjavik
- 1989–1991: Paris-Asnières
- 1991–1992: Bidasoa Irun
- 1992–1993: Paris-Asnières
- 1993–1994: CB Avidesa Alzira
- 1994–1995: VfL Gummersbach
- 1995–1997: TV Suhr
- 1997–1999: TSV St. Otmar St. Gallen
National team
| Years | Team | Apps | (Gls) |
| 1983-2001 | Iceland | 288 | (703) |

Teams managed
- 2006-2011: Iceland Women's team

Júlíus Jónasson (born 22 August 1964) is an Icelandic handball player and coach. He played for the Iceland men's national handball team at the 1992 Summer Olympics in Barcelona, where the Icelandic team placed fourth.

Jónasson was the head coach for the Iceland women's national handball team from 2006 to 2011. He managed to qualify the team for the first ever major international tournament, the 2010 European Women's Handball Championship. At the tournament he got them to a 15th place. A year later he managed them at the 2011 World Women's Handball Championship, where he got them to 12th.

== Private life ==
Jónasson was involved in the 2008–2011 Icelandic financial crisis, and 17 November 2011 he was ordered in court to pay back 28 million Icelandic krónur, because he had borrowed money from the bank he himself worked at, in order to invest it in said bank.
