= Ibrahim Diaw =

French-born Senegalese handball player (born 1979)

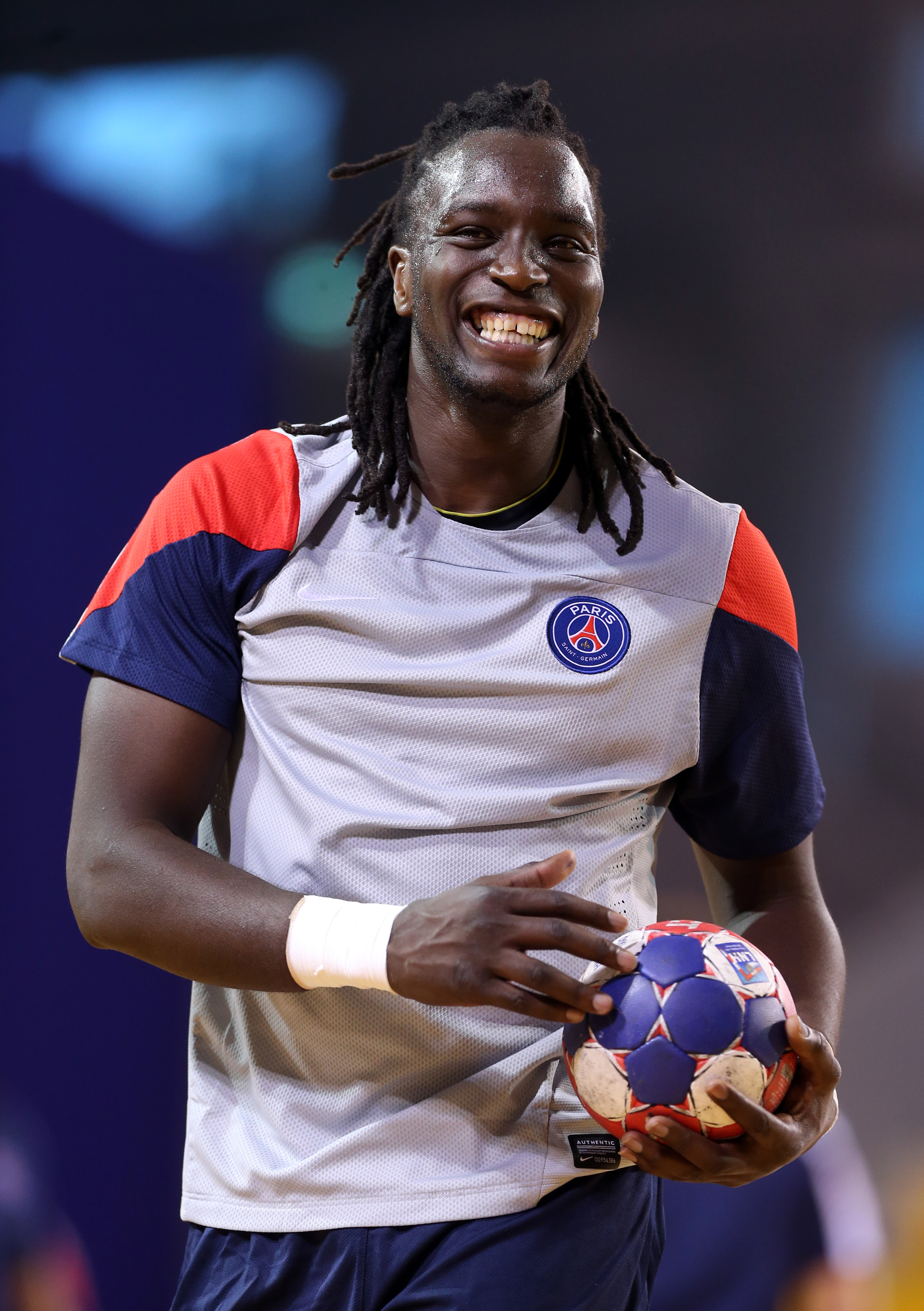
- Diaw in 2013

Personal information
- Full name: Ibrahim Diaw
- Nationality: Senegalese
- Born: 28 November 1979 (age 46) Poissy, France
- Height: 1.94 m (6 ft 4 in)

Sport
- Sport: Handball
- Position: Defender / Left Back
- Current club: Retired

Senior clubs
- Years: Team
- 2002–2009: PSG Handball
- 2009–2011: Istres Handball
- 2011–2014: PSG Handball
- 2014–2016: Dinamo București
- 2016–2018: USM Saran Handball
National team
- Years: Team
- –: Senegal

Ibrahim Diaw or Ibrahima Diaw (born 28 November 1979) is a French-born Senegalese retired handballer who played for the Senegalese national team. He was former co-captain of Paris Saint-Germain Handball alongside Didier Dinart, then with Daniel Narcisse.

== Achievements ==
- LNH Division 1:
  - Winner: 2013
  - Silver Medalist: 2005, 2014
  - Bronze Medalist: 2006
- LNH Division 2:
  - Winner: 2010
- Coupe de France:
  - Winner: 2007, 2014
  - Finalist: 2008, 2013
- Coupe de la Ligue:
  - Finalist: 2005, 2006
- Liga Națională:
  - Winner: 2016
  - Bronze Medalist: 2015
