= Ligue Nationale de Handball =

Professional handball organization in France

The Ligue Nationale de Handball (English: National Handball League) is a governing body established in 2004 to administer French men's professional handball autonomously from the national federation (FFHB). It has jurisdiction over the country's top two men's divisions, a cup tournament and a super cup.

== Competitions ==
- LNH Division 1, marketed as Starligue
- LNH Division 2, marketed as Proligue
- Coupe de la Ligue (English: League Cup)
- Trophée des Champions (English: Champions' Trophy)

== President ==
From June 2010 to February 2018, its president was former rugby union international player Philippe Bernat-Salles. Olivier Girault was the president from 2018 till 2020. David Tebib was an interim in 2021. Bruno Martini is the current president.
