= Trophée des Champions (handball) =

- Organiser(s): Ligue nationale de handball, Union des journalistes de sport en France
- Founded: 2010; 15 years ago
- Region: France
- Teams: 2
- Current champions: Montpellier Handball (4th title)
- Most championships: Paris Saint-Germain (5 titles)
- Website: https://www.lnh.fr/trophees-des-champions/accueil

The Trophée des Champions is a Super Cup in handball created in March 2010 by the Ligue Nationale de Handball, the main body of French handball. The competition usually takes place at the beginning of September a few days before the championship resumes and is therefore the first official match of the season.

The Women's Handball League does not organize an equivalent competition for women.

== Results ==
Edition	Winner	Finalists	Score	Location
2010	Montpellier AHB	Chambéry Savoie HB	32–30	Stade Louis-II, Monaco
2011	Montpellier AHB	Chambéry Savoie HB	30–23	Stade Louis-II, Monaco
2012	Dunkerque HGL (1)	Chambéry Savoie HB	26–25	Stade Louis-II, Monaco
2013	Chambéry Savoie HB (1)	Dunkerque HGL	23–21	Sousse, Tunisia
2014	Paris Saint-Germain	Dunkerque HGL	34–23	Monastir, Tunisia
2015	Paris Saint-Germain	Saint-Raphaël	29–27	Nantes
2016	Paris Saint-Germain	HBC Nantes	35–26	La Roche-sur-Yon
2017	HBC Nantes	Paris Saint-Germain	32–26	Rouen
2018	Montpellier Handball (3)	Saint-Raphaël	32–27	Montbéliard
2019	Paris Saint-Germain	Montpellier Handball	34–27	Limoges
2020	Cancelled			
2021	Not arranged			
2022	HBC Nantes	Paris Saint-Germain	37–33	Futuroscope, Chasseneuil-du-Poitou
2023	Paris Saint-Germain (5)	HBC Nantes	35–25	Glaz Arena, Cesson-Sévigné
2024	HBC Nantes (3)	Paris Saint-Germain	36–29	Futuroscope, Chasseneuil-du-Poitou
2025	Montpellier Handball (4)	Paris Saint-Germain	29–23	Futuroscope, Chasseneuil-du-Poitou

== Winners ==
#	Club	Titles		Second places	
#	Club	#	Years	#	Years
1	Paris Saint-Germain	5	2014, 2015, 2016, 2019, 2023	4	2017, 2022, 2024, 2025
2	Montpellier Handball	4	2010, 2011, 2018, 2025	1	2019
3	HBC Nantes	3	2017, 2022, 2024	2	2016, 2023
4	Chambéry Savoie HB	1	2013	3	2010, 2011, 2012
5	Dunkerque HGL	1	2012	2	2013, 2014
6	Saint-Raphaël VHB	0	-	2	2015, 2018
-	No Competition	2	2020, 2021	2	2020, 2021

== See also ==
- LNH
- Division 1
- Coupe de France
