= Le Phare (Chambéry) =

Arena in Chambéry, France

Coordinates: 45.583583°N 5.89968°E

- Interactive map of Le Phare
- Location: Chambéry, France
- Capacity: 5,200: handball 14,000: Concerts

Construction
- Groundbreaking: January 2007
- Opened: January 2009
- Architects: PATRIARCHE & CO

Tenant
- Chambéry Savoie Mont-Blanc Handball

Le Phare is an indoor sporting arena located in Chambéry, France. The capacity of the arena is 4,500 people for handball until 14,000 for Concerts and it has a total Large Area with 29074 m^{2} It is currently home for Chambéry Savoie Mont-Blanc team handball team.
