= 2025 World Men's Handball Championship squads =

This article displays the squads for the 2025 World Men's Handball Championship. Each team consisted of 18 players, of which 16 were fielded for each game.

Age, club, appearances and goals correct as of 14 January 2025.

== Group A ==
=== Czech Republic ===
A 21-player squad was announced on 23 December 2024. The list was renewed on 1 January 2025. It was cut to 19 on 12 January 2025. The final roster was revealed on 14 January 2025.

Head coach: (Spain) Xavi Sabaté

No.	Pos.	Name	Date of birth (age)	Height	App.	Goals	Club
1	GK	Tomáš Mrkva	20 January 1989 (aged 35)	2.00 m	128	11	(Germany) THW Kiel
2	LW	Jakub Hrstka	17 March 1990 (aged 34)	1.87 m	150	484	(Czech Republic) HC Zubří
4	GK	Jan Hrdlička	10 November 1996 (aged 28)	1.95 m	17	0	(Poland) Energa MKS Kalisz
6	RW	Dominik Skopár	4 May 2006 (aged 18)	1.80 m	2	11	(Czech Republic) Talent Plzeň
7	RB	Tomáš Piroch	12 May 2000 (aged 24)	1.88 m	37	88	(Poland) Orlen Wisła Płock
14	RW	Jakub Štěrba	11 July 1996 (aged 28)	1.84 m	24	55	(Germany) ASV Hamm-Westfalen
17	RB	Stanislav Kašpárek	11 June 1996 (aged 28)	2.02 m	70	228	(Romania) Dinamo București
18	P	Vít Reichl	15 June 1993 (aged 31)	1.88 m	22	54	(Germany) TV Hüttenberg
19	CB	Tomáš Babák	28 December 1993 (aged 31)	1.86 m	100	299	(Germany) Bergischer HC
21	CB	Dušan Palát	2 April 2001 (aged 23)	1.85 m	1	3	(Czech Republic) HC Zubří
23	LB	Jonáš Josef	29 July 2004 (aged 20)	1.90 m	2	1	(Czech Republic) HC Dukla Prague
28	CB	Matěj Havran	22 January 2002 (aged 22)	1.90 m	16	4	(Hungary) Tatabánya KC
34	LB	Dominik Solák	17 August 1997 (aged 27)	1.98 m	42	35	(Czech Republic) HCB Karviná
35	RB	Martin Rakouský	26 June 2002 (aged 22)	1.80 m	0	0	(Czech Republic) HC Dukla Prague
39	CB	Lukáš Mořkovský	4 January 2002 (aged 23)	1.89 m	11	11	(Poland) Górnik Zabrze
49	LB	Daniel Bláha	27 December 2005 (aged 19)	2.12 m	6	6	(Czech Republic) Talent Plzeň
66	P	Štěpán Zeman	9 May 1997 (aged 27)	2.02 m	62	55	(Germany) VfL Gummersbach
77	P	Daniel Režnický	26 March 1998 (aged 26)	1.90 m	21	17	(Poland) Rebud KPR Ostrovia
93	LW	Jan Blecha	22 April 1993 (aged 31)	1.84 m	10	19	(Czech Republic) HC Dukla Prague

=== Germany ===
A 19-player squad was announced on 17 December 2024. The final roster was revealed on 11 January 2025.

Head coach: (Iceland) Alfreð Gíslason

No.	Pos.	Name	Date of birth (age)	Height	App.	Goals	Club
1	GK	David Späth	29 April 2002 (aged 22)	2.02 m	31	1	(Germany) Rhein-Neckar Löwen
3	CB	Nils Lichtlein	31 July 2002 (aged 22)	1.83 m	17	11	(Germany) Füchse Berlin
4	P	Johannes Golla	5 November 1997 (aged 27)	1.95 m	94	334	(Germany) SG Flensburg-Handewitt
7	CB	Luca Witzke	3 April 1999 (aged 25)	1.92 m	40	80	(Germany) SC DHfK Leipzig
15	CB	Juri Knorr	9 May 2000 (aged 24)	1.90 m	70	270	(Germany) Rhein-Neckar Löwen
17	RW	Lukas Zerbe	17 January 1996 (aged 28)	1.84 m	34	66	(Germany) THW Kiel
18	LB	Julian Köster	16 March 2000 (aged 24)	2.00 m	60	143	(Germany) VfL Gummersbach
22	CB	Marian Michalczik	1 February 1997 (aged 27)	1.99 m	30	26	(Germany) TSV Hannover-Burgdorf
23	RB	Renārs Uščins	29 April 2002 (aged 22)	1.88 m	32	129	(Germany) TSV Hannover-Burgdorf
32	RB	Franz Semper	5 July 1997 (aged 27)	1.90 m	24	45	(Germany) SC DHfK Leipzig
33	GK	Andreas Wolff	3 March 1991 (aged 33)	1.98 m	173	14	(Germany) THW Kiel
34	LW	Rune Dahmke	10 April 1993 (aged 31)	1.89 m	86	129	(Germany) THW Kiel
36	LW	Lukas Mertens	22 March 1996 (aged 28)	1.82 m	59	135	(Germany) SC Magdeburg
39	LB	Lukas Stutzke	14 January 1998 (aged 27)	1.95 m	14	16	(Germany) TSV Hannover-Burgdorf
44	RB	Christoph Steinert	18 January 1990 (aged 34)	1.95 m	59	103	(Germany) HC Erlangen
54	P	Justus Fischer	6 February 2003 (aged 21)	1.94 m	23	26	(Germany) TSV Hannover-Burgdorf
71	LB	Marko Grgić	11 September 2003 (aged 21)	1.98 m	16	40	(Germany) ThSV Eisenach
73	RW	Timo Kastening	25 June 1995 (aged 29)	1.80 m	63	199	(Germany) MT Melsungen

=== Poland ===
A 27-player squad was announced on 18 December 2024. It was cut to 21 players on 3 January 2025. The final roster was revealed on 13 January 2025.

Head coach: Marcin Lijewski

No.	Pos.	Name	Date of birth (age)	Height	App.	Goals	Club
2	LB	Damian Przytuła	27 November 1998 (aged 26)	2.00 m	47	85	(Hungary) MOL Tatabánya KC
4	CB	Piotr Jędraszczyk	9 October 2001 (aged 23)	1.77 m	39	80	(Poland) Corotop Gwardia Opole
5	LB	Michał Olejniczak	31 January 2001 (aged 23)	1.95 m	71	122	(Poland) Industria Kielce
8	P	Bartłomiej Bis	25 March 1997 (aged 27)	1.94 m	38	12	(Germany) HSC 2000 Coburg
11	CB	Paweł Paterek	17 December 2000 (aged 24)	1.86 m	19	34	(Poland) KGHM Chrobry Głogów
12	LB	Ariel Pietrasik	21 October 1999 (aged 25)	2.02 m	44	91	(Switzerland) Kadetten Schaffhausen
19	LW	Jan Czuwara	18 October 1995 (aged 29)	1.84 m	74	150	(Poland) Zagłębie Lubin
20	CB	Kamil Adamski	17 May 1995 (aged 29)	1.93 m	4	3	(Poland) Rebud KPR Ostrovia
21	P	Kamil Syprzak	23 July 1991 (aged 33)	2.07 m	177	404	(France) Paris Saint-Germain
23	RB	Arkadiusz Moryto	31 August 1997 (aged 27)	1.82 m	104	504	(Poland) Industria Kielce
26	RW	Marek Marciniak	21 September 1995 (aged 29)	1.88 m	3	4	(Poland) Azoty Puławy
28	P	Maciej Gębala	10 January 1994 (aged 31)	2.00 m	105	136	(Germany) HC Erlangen
44	LW	Mikołaj Czapliński	11 August 2000 (aged 24)	1.88 m	22	40	(Poland) PGE Wybrzeże Gdańsk
46	RW	Mateusz Wojdan	19 December 2000 (aged 24)	1.77 m	3	7	(Poland) Corotop Gwardia Opole
60	GK	Kacper Ligarzewski	14 June 2001 (aged 23)	1.89 m	3	0	(Poland) Górnik Zabrze
75	GK	Marcel Jastrzębski	14 March 2003 (aged 21)	1.95 m	10	0	(Poland) Orlen Wisła Płock
93	P	Łukasz Rogulski	10 June 1993 (aged 31)	1.92 m	6	6	(Poland) Industria Kielce
94	GK	Adam Morawski	17 October 1994 (aged 30)	1.90 m	85	7	(Germany) MT Melsungen

=== Switzerland ===
A 20-player squad was announced on 24 December 2024. The final roster was revealed on 8 January 2025.

Head coach: Andy Schmid

No.	Pos.	Name	Date of birth (age)	Height	App.	Goals	Club
3	P	Lucas Meister	16 August 1996 (aged 28)	1.96 m	85	207	(Switzerland) Kadetten Schaffhausen
4	LB	Lenny Rubin	1 February 1996 (aged 28)	2.05 m	77	280	(Germany) TVB Stuttgart
6	RW	Gian Attenhofer	26 April 2002 (aged 22)	1.85 m	6	2	(Germany) ThSV Eisenach
11	CB	Felix Aellen	11 October 2003 (aged 21)	1.84 m	11	16	(Switzerland) BSV Bern
13	RB	Michael Kusio	31 August 1998 (aged 26)	1.95 m	17	6	(Switzerland) BSV Bern
16	GK	Nikola Portner	19 November 1993 (aged 31)	1.94 m	132	30	(Germany) SC Magdeburg
17	P	Samuel Röthlisberger	15 August 1996 (aged 28)	1.99 m	83	22	(Germany) TVB Stuttgart
18	RB	Dimitrij Küttel	18 February 1994 (aged 30)	1.92 m	81	162	(Switzerland) HC Kriens-Luzern
20	LB	Luka Maros	20 March 1994 (aged 30)	1.96 m	72	154	(Switzerland) Kadetten Schaffhausen
21	RW	Gino Steenaerts	5 May 2005 (aged 19)	1.84 m	4	6	(Switzerland) HC Kriens-Luzern
23	P	Lukas Laube	22 April 2000 (aged 24)	1.92 m	26	61	(Germany) TVB Stuttgart
28	CB	Luca Sigrist	4 October 2005 (aged 19)	1.87 m	2	3	(Switzerland) HC Kriens-Luzern
29	LW	Samuel Zehnder	29 February 2000 (aged 24)	1.83 m	52	103	(Germany) TBV Lemgo
30	P	Joël Willecke	23 November 2003 (aged 21)	1.96 m	23	7	(Switzerland) HSC Suhr Aarau
35	LW	Noam Leopold	17 July 2002 (aged 22)	1.81 m	8	4	(France) HBC Nantes
38	GK	Jannis Scheidiger	8 August 2002 (aged 22)	1.93 m	8	2	(Switzerland) HSC Suhr Aarau
40	GK	Mathieu Seravalli	15 September 2004 (aged 20)	1.90 m	3	0	(Switzerland) BSV Bern
44	LB	Mehdi Ben Romdhane	2 December 2001 (aged 23)	1.89 m	31	32	(Switzerland) Kadetten Schaffhausen

== Group B ==
=== Algeria ===
A 24-player squad was announced on 25 December 2024. The final roster was revealed on 14 January 2025.

Head coach: Farouk Dehili

No.	Pos.	Name	Date of birth (age)	Height	App.	Goals	Club
2	LB	Zouhir Naim	3 May 1996 (aged 28)	1.87 m	0	0	(United Arab Emirates) Sharjah SC
5	CB	Hani Bounab	20 December 2000 (aged 24)	1.89 m	13	50	(Algeria) JSE Skikda
6	LB	Messaoud Berkous	20 July 1989 (aged 35)	1.94 m	163	472	(Qatar) Al-Arabi
7	LW	Hichem Daoud	9 January 1992 (aged 33)	1.91 m	67	115	(France) Pau Billère handball
11	RW	Ali Boulesha	9 November 1991 (aged 33)	1.80 m	0	0	(Algeria) JSE Skikda
15	RW	Redouane Saker	1 October 1991 (aged 33)	1.79 m	36	52	(Algeria) JSE Skikda
16	GK	Yahia Zemouchi	17 September 1994 (aged 30)	1.90 m	25	0	(Algeria) HBC El Biar
17	P	Zine Boughaba	21 March 2000 (aged 24)	2.00 m	10	15	(Qatar) Al-Shamal
22	GK	Khalifa Ghedbane	26 November 1996 (aged 28)	2.02 m	99	5	(Germany) HC Erlangen
24	CB	Rayane Abrous	16 August 2001 (aged 23)	1.91 m	10	21	(Saudi Arabia) Al-Ahli
31	RB	Elyas Bouadjadja	21 April 2002 (aged 22)	1.97 m	0	0	(France) Massy Essonne Handball
33	LW	Mounir Chehri	4 June 1999 (aged 25)	1.79 m	0	0	(Norway) Halden Topphåndball
36	RB	Mohamed Hacene-Djaballah	18 April 1993 (aged 31)	1.90 m	8	10	(Saudi Arabia) Al-Rawdhah
44	CB	Moustapha Hadj Sadok	17 August 1997 (aged 27)	1.92 m	52	202	(Kuwait) Al-Nasr
63	GK	Salim Mezaza	26 January 2004 (aged 20)	1.96 m	10	3	(Spain) CB Ciudad de Logroño
77	P	Islam Kaabeche	6 November 1998 (aged 26)	1.98 m	0	0	(Algeria) JSE Skikda
87	RB	Ayoub Abdi	16 February 1997 (aged 27)	1.98 m	50	269	(France) HBC Nantes
94	P	Bastien Khermouche	10 November 1993 (aged 31)	1.92 m	23	45	(France) Dijon Métropole Handball
98	P	Abdeldjalil Zannadi	18 May 1998 (aged 26)	1.98 m	17	22	(Hungary) Eger-Eszterházy SzSE

=== Denmark ===
A 19-player squad was announced on 18 December 2024.

Head coach: Nikolaj Jacobsen

No.	Pos.	Name	Date of birth (age)	Height	App.	Goals	Club
3	RB	Niclas Kirkeløkke	26 March 1994 (aged 30)	1.95 m	93	180	(Germany) SG Flensburg-Handewitt
4	LW	Magnus Landin Jacobsen	20 August 1995 (aged 29)	1.97 m	147	273	(Germany) THW Kiel
7	LW	Emil Jakobsen	24 January 1998 (aged 26)	1.92 m	84	272	(Germany) SG Flensburg-Handewitt
11	CB	Rasmus Lauge	20 June 1991 (aged 33)	1.93 m	176	435	(Denmark) Bjerringbro-Silkeborg
12	GK	Emil Nielsen	10 March 1997 (aged 27)	1.95 m	54	6	(Spain) FC Barcelona
15	P	Magnus Saugstrup	12 July 1996 (aged 28)	1.97 m	94	196	(Germany) SC Magdeburg
16	GK	Jannick Green	29 September 1988 (aged 36)	1.95 m	139	2	(France) Paris Saint-Germain
19	RB	Mathias Gidsel	8 February 1999 (aged 25)	1.90 m	81	467	(Germany) Füchse Berlin
20	GK	Kevin Møller	20 June 1989 (aged 35)	2.03 m	82	7	(Germany) SG Flensburg-Handewitt
21	LB	Henrik Møllgaard	2 January 1985 (aged 40)	1.97 m	228	182	(Denmark) Aalborg Håndbold
22	CB	Mads Mensah Larsen	12 August 1991 (aged 33)	1.88 m	206	327	(Germany) SG Flensburg-Handewitt
25	P	Lukas Jørgensen	31 March 1999 (aged 25)	1.93 m	45	130	(Germany) SG Flensburg-Handewitt
26	RW	Jóhan Hansen	1 May 1994 (aged 30)	1.90 m	95	176	(Germany) SG Flensburg-Handewitt
28	LB	Lasse Andersson	11 March 1994 (aged 30)	1.96 m	73	84	(Germany) Füchse Berlin
33	P	Emil Bergholt	25 August 1997 (aged 27)	1.90 m	7	9	(Denmark) Skjern Håndbold
34	P	Simon Hald	28 September 1994 (aged 30)	2.03 m	98	102	(Denmark) Aalborg Håndbold
42	CB	Thomas Arnoldsen	11 January 2002 (aged 23)	1.94 m	19	52	(Denmark) Aalborg Håndbold
43	LB	Simon Pytlick	11 December 2000 (aged 24)	1.91 m	48	209	(Germany) SG Flensburg-Handewitt
45	RB	Emil Madsen	1 January 2001 (aged 24)	1.94 m	18	37	(Germany) THW Kiel

=== Italy ===
An 18-player squad was announced on 23 December 2024. A 19-player roster was revealed on 2 January 2025. The final roster was revealed on 7 January 2025.

Head coach: Riccardo Trillini

No.	Pos.	Name	Date of birth (age)	Height	App.	Goals	Club
1	GK	Domenico Ebner	26 April 1994 (aged 30)	1.92 m	53	9	(Germany) SC DHfK Leipzig
2	RW	Leo Prantner	24 November 2001 (aged 23)	1.78 m	28	18	(Germany) HBW Balingen-Weilstetten
4	LW	Tommaso De Angelis	21 September 2005 (aged 19)	1.75 m	19	22	(Spain) BM Benidorm
5	LW	Gianluca Dapiran	9 May 1994 (aged 30)	1.93 m	65	78	(Italy) Cassano Magnago
6	LB	Davide Bulzamini	3 February 1995 (aged 29)	1.94 m	72	105	(Italy) Accademia Pallamano Conversano
7	LB	Filippo Angiolini	23 April 1999 (aged 25)	1.90 m	11	0	(Italy) ASD Albatro
8	RB	Giacomo Savini	19 May 1998 (aged 26)	1.85 m	61	46	(Italy) Cassano Magnago
9	P	Gabriele Sontacchi	19 September 2003 (aged 21)	1.90 m	7	3	(Italy) SSV Bozen Loacker
10	CB	Marco Mengon	3 January 2000 (aged 25)	1.90 m	52	81	(France) Sélestat Alsace Handball
13	RW	Umberto Bronzo	29 December 2000 (aged 24)	1.83 m	38	48	(Italy) Handball Sassari
15	CB	Simone Mengon	3 January 2000 (aged 25)	1.92 m	37	57	(Germany) ThSV Eisenach
16	GK	Andrea Colleluori	17 May 2000 (aged 24)	1.87 m	34	0	(Italy) Meran Handball
17	P	Endrit Iballi	15 May 1998 (aged 26)	1.89 m	23	12	(Italy) SSV Brixen
19	RW	Thomas Bortoli	20 February 2002 (aged 22)	1.94 m	36	44	(France) Istres Provence Handball
24	LB	Mikael Helmersson	29 September 2003 (aged 21)	1.99 m	7	23	(Germany) HSC 2000 Coburg
25	CB	Pablo Marrochi	13 September 1986 (aged 38)	1.90 m	48	95	(Italy) Accademia Pallamano Conversano
29	LW	Jeremi Pirani	18 January 1994 (aged 30)	1.78 m	0	0	Tremblay-en-France Handball
30	P	Tommaso Romei	30 March 2003 (aged 21)	1.90 m	4	0	(Italy) Meran Handball
32	P	Andrea Parisini	18 November 1994 (aged 30)	1.94 m	97	161	(France) Pays d'Aix Université Club
90	GK	Giovanni Pavani	3 August 2000 (aged 24)	1.86 m	3	0	(Italy) Handball Sassari

=== Tunisia ===
A 20-player squad was announced on 24 December 2024.

Head coach: Mohamed Sghir

No.	Pos.	Name	Date of birth (age)	Height	App.	Goals	Club
6	P	Ghazi Ben Ghali	28 March 1999 (aged 25)	1.98 m	31	29	(Qatar) Al-Gharafa
10	CB	Bilel Abdelli	4 August 1995 (aged 29)	1.90 m	49	74	(Tunisia) Espérance de Tunis
16	GK	Mohamed Sfar	4 January 1990 (aged 35)	1.94 m	44	0	(Tunisia) Espérance de Tunis
17	RB	Oussama Hosni	17 September 1992 (aged 32)	1.93 m	130	162	(North Macedonia) RK Eurofarm Pelister
22	LB	Youssef Maaraf	21 July 1996 (aged 28)	1.95 m	100	185	(Saudi Arabia) Al Safa
23	LW	Oussama Rmeiki	8 October 1996 (aged 28)	1.93 m	42	67	(Tunisia) Club Africain
25	CB	Abdelhak Ben Salah	25 April 1990 (aged 34)	1.84 m	84	170	(Tunisia) Espérance de Tunis
28	LB	Hazem Bacha	8 December 2001 (aged 23)	2.05 m	33	66	(Tunisia) Espérance de Tunis
29	RW	Tarek Jallouz	1 November 1993 (aged 31)	1.83 m	38	58	(Tunisia) Espérance de Tunis
31	LB	Mohamed Frad	25 September 1993 (aged 31)	1.90 m	20	20	(Kuwait) Kazma
33	RB	Yassine Ben Salem	11 January 2003 (aged 22)	1.90 m	13	24	(France) C' Chartres Métropole Handball
39	CB	Rayen Zariat	11 January 2003 (aged 22)	1.90 m	15	12	(United Arab Emirates) Shabab Al Ahli Club
55	LW	Ghassen Toumi	14 June 1997 (aged 27)	1.80 m	70	159	(Tunisia) Espérance de Tunis
61	GK	Yassine Belkaied	19 October 2000 (aged 24)	1.97 m	38	3	(France) Fenix Toulouse Handball
72	P	Mohamed Ben Hammouda	7 December 2002 (aged 22)	1.92 m	7	5	(Tunisia) Association Sportive d'Hammamet
93	GK	Fradj Ben Tekaya	29 April 1998 (aged 26)	1.91 m	5	0	(Spain) BM Ciudad Encantada
96	RB	Anouar Ben Abdallah	20 June 1996 (aged 28)	1.88 m	80	167	(Kuwait) Kazma
97	RB	Achref Marghli	22 May 1997 (aged 27)	1.93 m	18	21	(North Macedonia) RK Vardar
98	P	Islem Jbeli	13 December 1998 (aged 26)	1.93 m	39	72	(Tunisia) Espérance de Tunis

== Group C ==
=== Austria ===
The squad was announced on 20 December 2024.

Head coach: (Slovenia) Aleš Pajovič

No.	Pos.	Name	Date of birth (age)	Height	App.	Goals	Club
1	GK	Leon Bergmann	17 April 2004 (aged 20)	1.96 m	6	1	(Austria) Fivers Margareten
6	CB	Markus Mahr	3 November 2000 (aged 24)	1.89 m	23	23	(Austria) Bregenz Handball
11	LB	József Albek	30 June 1999 (aged 25)	1.95 m	5	1	(Austria) HC SSV Graz
16	GK	Florian Kaiper	26 May 1995 (aged 29)	1.87 m	25	1	(Austria) HC Linz AG
20	LW	Sebastian Frimmel	18 December 1995 (aged 29)	1.90 m	115	396	(Hungary) OTP Bank-Pick Szeged
23	LB	Nemanja Beloš	8 June 1994 (aged 30)	1.92 m	13	4	(Austria) HC SSV Graz
26	P	Lukas Herburger	19 December 1994 (aged 30)	1.97 m	79	71	(Germany) Füchse Berlin
29	P	Lukas Schweighofer	29 December 1992 (aged 32)	1.92 m	19	5	(Austria) HC SSV Graz
30	RB	Boris Zivkovic	2 May 1992 (aged 32)	1.95 m	80	160	(Kuwait) Al-Qurain
44	RB	Nicolas Paulnsteiner	16 July 2004 (aged 20)	1.93 m	0	0	(Germany) Füchse Berlin
45	LW	Eric Damböck	6 September 1999 (aged 25)	1.81 m	41	41	(Austria) HSC Kreuzlingen
55	P	Tobias Wagner	26 March 1995 (aged 29)	1.98 m	110	309	(Germany) HC Erlangen
57	RW	Jakob Nigg	6 May 2003 (aged 21)	1.85 m	22	22	(Austria) Fivers Margareten
66	CB	Elias Kofler	9 August 2000 (aged 24)	1.89 m	27	11	(Germany) 1. VfL Potsdam
72	LB	Lukas Hutecek	2 July 2000 (aged 24)	1.91 m	59	202	(Germany) TBV Lemgo
86	RW	Franko Lastro	13 April 2003 (aged 21)	1.85 m	23	29	(Germany) Frisch Auf Göppingen
97	RB	Michael Miskovez	29 August 1997 (aged 27)	1.96 m	37	6	(Austria) Handball Tirol
98	GK	Constantin Möstl	1 April 2000 (aged 24)	1.86 m	34	0	(Germany) TBV Lemgo

=== France ===
A 22-player squad was announced on 23 December 2024. The final roster was revealed on 11 January 2025.

Head coach: Guillaume Gille

No.	Pos.	Name	Date of birth (age)	Height	App.	Goals	Club
1	GK	Samir Bellahcene	20 February 1995 (aged 29)	1.91 m	13	1	(Germany) TVB Stuttgart
4	CB	Aymeric Minne	20 April 1997 (aged 27)	1.87 m	33	93	(France) HBC Nantes
5	CB	Nedim Remili	18 July 1995 (aged 29)	1.95 m	136	411	(Hungary) Telekom Veszprém
6	RB	Julien Bos	18 August 1998 (aged 26)	1.88 m	6	12	(France) HBC Nantes
7	LB	Romain Lagarde	5 March 1997 (aged 27)	1.94 m	79	86	(France) Pays d'Aix Université Club
8	LB	Elohim Prandi	24 August 1998 (aged 26)	1.93 m	48	124	(France) Paris Saint-Germain
9	RB	Melvyn Richardson	31 January 1997 (aged 27)	1.90 m	97	230	(Spain) FC Barcelona
10	RB	Dika Mem	31 August 1997 (aged 27)	1.94 m	126	441	(Spain) FC Barcelona
11	P	Nicolas Tournat	4 May 1994 (aged 30)	2.00 m	103	233	(France) HBC Nantes
12	GK	Valentin Kieffer	2 July 1999 (aged 25)	1.90 m	0	0	(France) Chambéry Savoie Mont-Blanc Handball
15	LW	Mathieu Grebille	6 October 1991 (aged 33)	1.98 m	93	140	(France) Paris Saint-Germain
16	GK	Charles Bolzinger	14 December 2000 (aged 24)	1.98 m	15	1	(France) Montpellier Handball
22	P	Luka Karabatic	19 April 1988 (aged 36)	2.02 m	162	176	(France) Paris Saint-Germain
23	P	Ludovic Fabregas	1 July 1996 (aged 28)	1.98 m	151	375	(Hungary) Telekom Veszprém
29	RW	Benoît Kounkoud	19 February 1997 (aged 27)	1.90 m	49	71	(Poland) Industria Kielce
31	LW	Dylan Nahi	30 November 1999 (aged 25)	1.92 m	64	169	(Poland) Industria Kielce
34	P	Karl Konan	3 June 1995 (aged 29)	1.96 m	44	7	(France) Montpellier Handball
39	LB	Thibaud Briet	14 December 1999 (aged 25)	2.05 m	28	46	(France) HBC Nantes
92	GK	Rémi Desbonnet	28 February 1992 (aged 32)	1.82 m	50	4	(France) Montpellier Handball

=== Kuwait ===
A 23-player squad was announced on 8 December 2024. The final roster was revealed on 3 January 2025.

Head coach: Said Hadjazi

No.	Pos.	Name	Date of birth (age)	Height	App.	Goals	Club
5	CB	Abdullah Al-Khamees	23 June 1992 (aged 32)	1.86 m	54	42	Kuwait SC
6	RW	Saleh Ali	28 September 1990 (aged 34)	1.73 m	45	67	Kuwait SC
7	LW	Abdulaziz Al-Shammari	8 August 1992 (aged 32)	1.81 m	32	35	Kuwait SC
18	P	Mohammad Al-Sanea	21 May 1996 (aged 28)	1.87 m	7	14	(Kuwait) Qadsia SC
19	RB	Mohammad Al-Hendal	19 October 1997 (aged 27)	1.88 m	17	30	(Kuwait) Al-Fahaheel SC
20	RW	Mishaal Al-Harbi	8 June 1992 (aged 32)	1.74 m	37	35	Kuwait SC
22	GK	Hasan Safar	7 December 1998 (aged 26)	1.87 m	25	2	Kuwait SC
23	LB	Saif Al-Dawani	17 April 2002 (aged 22)	1.89 m	25	63	Kuwait SC
24	LB	Mohammad Radhei	2 July 1996 (aged 28)	1.93 m	26	24	Kuwait SC
37	CB	Saleh Al-Raghaib	26 August 2005 (aged 19)	1.79 m	15	28	(Kuwait) Burgan SC
44	P	Mohammad Ghadnafar	25 June 1996 (aged 28)	1.91 m	12	13	(Kuwait) Burgan SC
49	LB	Fawaz Mubarak	19 August 1998 (aged 26)	1.95 m	15	18	(Kuwait) Al-Arabi SC
66	CB	Abdulaziz Salmeen	31 May 1999 (aged 25)	1.74 m	19	26	(Kuwait) Qadsia SC
72	P	Abdulrahman Al-Shammari	16 September 2002 (aged 22)	1.94 m	15	31	(Kuwait) Kazma SC
79	RB	Ali Jaafar	7 December 2002 (aged 22)	1.79 m	13	34	(Kuwait) Al-Arabi SC
80	GK	Abdulaziz Al-Thafiri	11 July 1993 (aged 31)	1.89 m	32	1	(Kuwait) Kazma SC
84	LW	Haider Dashti	5 December 2000 (aged 24)	1.92 m	26	34	(Kuwait) Al-Salmiya SC
97	GK	Mohammad Buyabes	9 June 1997 (aged 27)	1.92 m	18	0	(Kuwait) Burgan SC

=== Qatar ===
A 20-player squad was announced on 3 January 2025.

Head coach: (Montenegro) Veselin Vujović

No.	Pos.	Name	Date of birth (age)	Height	App.	Goals	Club
1	RB	Žarko Marković	1 June 1986 (aged 38)	1.96 m	13	31	(Qatar) Al-Gharafa
7	LW	Ahmad Madadi	31 August 1994 (aged 30)	1.75 m	97	298	(Qatar) Al Duhail
9	LB	Rafael Capote	5 October 1987 (aged 37)	2.00 m	91	348	(Qatar) Al Duhail
10	LB	Frankis Carol	7 September 1987 (aged 37)	1.91 m	70	235	Kuwait SC
11	LW	Abdulrazzaq Ahmad	29 June 1990 (aged 34)	1.86 m	114	177	(Qatar) Al-Gharafa
12	GK	Bilal Lepenica	26 December 1996 (aged 28)	1.91 m	50	0	(Qatar) Al Duhail
13	RW	Eldar Memišević	21 June 1992 (aged 32)	1.78 m	120	232	(Qatar) Al-Rayyan
16	GK	Irhad Alihodžić	22 December 1996 (aged 28)	1.85 m	20	0	(Qatar) Al Arabi
17	LB	Amir Nowraddine	7 March 1995 (aged 29)	1.90 m	77	unknown	(Qatar) Al-Gharafa
22	CB	Abdelrahman Tarek	1 January 1994 (aged 31)	1.89 m	70	106	(Qatar) Al Duhail
23	RW	Allaedine Berrached	31 January 1994 (aged 30)	1.86 m	87	179	(Qatar) Al Duhail
24	CB	Wajdi Sinen	17 September 1990 (aged 34)	1.93 m	93	298	(Qatar) Al Arabi
28	RW	Nidhal Aissa	8 June 1991 (aged 33)	1.88 m	18	20	(Qatar) Al Arabi
37	P	Yassine Sami	1 May 1985 (aged 39)	1.91 m	46	42	(Qatar) Al Wakrah
41	P	Youssef Benali	28 May 1987 (aged 37)	1.90 m	107	186	(Qatar) Al Rayyan
44	LB	Amine Guehis	23 March 1996 (aged 28)	2.03 m	54	134	(Qatar) Al Duhail
88	CB	Moustafa Heiba	17 December 1996 (aged 28)	1.84 m	94	175	(Qatar) Al Duhail
93	LW	Hamdi Ayed	16 August 1993 (aged 31)	1.88 m	80	109	(Qatar) Al Duhail
94	LB	Ameen Zakkar	15 June 1994 (aged 30)	1.98 m	85	120	(Qatar) Al Rayyan
98	GK	Anadin Suljaković	16 June 1998 (aged 26)	1.96 m	43	0	(Germany) HSG Wetzlar

== Group D ==
=== Guinea ===
Head coach: (France) Kévin Decaux

No.	Pos.	Name	Date of birth (age)	Height	App.	Goals	Club
7	P	Sambou Sissoko	30 January 1991 (aged 33)	1.90 m	9	24	(France) AS Neuilly-en-Thelle
10	CB	Omar Baradji	5 September 1998 (aged 26)	1.96 m	17	33	(Guinea) Univers Sport de Guinée
15	P	Modibo Sidibé	15 December 1998 (aged 26)	1.87 m	6	16	(France) Elite Val d'Oise Handball
17	RB	Lilian Pasquet	5 August 1996 (aged 28)	1.92 m	11	57	(France) Pontault-Combault Handball
19	LW	Adjiri Corcher	19 May 1998 (aged 26)	1.87 m	9	34	(France) Angers SCO
21	P	Sireoumar Diallo	30 November 1999 (aged 25)	1.97 m	11	56	(Guinea) Univers Sport de Guinée
24	RB	Fenotina Doisel	26 August 1998 (aged 26)	1.80 m	2	28	(France) HBC Livry-Gargan
27	RB	Victor Sawadogo	30 August 1987 (aged 37)	1.85 m	5	12	(France) St Michel Cugand Handball
28	CB	Boubou Touré	29 January 1994 (aged 30)	1.87 m	9	31	(France) AS Saint-Ouen-l'Aumône
29	LB	Jordan Pitre	6 April 1992 (aged 32)	1.91 m	8	14	(France) Saint-Marcel Vernon HB
70	LW	Mohamed Sylla	12 December 2001 (aged 23)	1.85 m	19	76	(Guinea) Espoir Olympique
77	CB	David Eponouh	1 April 1999 (aged 25)	1.95 m	8	31	(France) Draguignan Var Handbal]
93	P	Makan Magassa	20 August 1990 (aged 34)	1.80 m	3	27	(France) Joinville Handball
94	GK	Bryan Jabea	28 June 1992 (aged 32)	1.96 m	9	0	(France) Torcy Handball Marne-la-Vallée
95	GK	Rubens Pierre	14 May 1999 (aged 25)	1.95 m	4	0	Tremblay-en-France Handball
97	RW	Theo Lebon	10 December 1997 (aged 27)	1.84 m	11	55	(France) US Dreux-Vernouillet
98	GK	Mohamed Camara	17 April 2002 (aged 22)	1.96 m	13	0	(Guinea) Espoir Olympique
99	RB	Kalagban Oulare	26 October 2003 (aged 21)	1.85 m	5	18	(Guinea) Espoir Olympique

=== Hungary ===
A 20-player squad was announced on 11 December 2024.

Head coach: (Spain) Chema Rodríguez

No.	Pos.	Name	Date of birth (age)	Height	App.	Goals	Club
2	P	Adrián Sipos	8 March 1990 (aged 34)	1.98 m	89	39	(Germany) MT Melsungen
7	LW	Bendegúz Bóka	2 October 1993 (aged 31)	1.93 m	93	222	(Hungary) Balatonfüredi KSE
10	RW	Zsolt Krakovszki	9 July 2002 (aged 22)	1.88 m	13	22	(Germany) HSG Wetzlar
11	LB	Patrik Ligetvári	13 February 1996 (aged 28)	2.03 m	108	89	(Hungary) Telekom Veszprém
16	GK	Roland Mikler	20 September 1984 (aged 40)	1.93 m	247	1	(Hungary) OTP Bank-Pick Szeged
18	LW	Bence Krakovszki	9 July 2002 (aged 22)	1.87 m	10	18	(Hungary) MOL-Tatabánya KC
24	CB	Gergő Fazekas	31 October 2003 (aged 21)	1.90 m	34	58	(Poland) Orlen Wisła Płock
27	P	Bence Bánhidi	9 February 1995 (aged 29)	2.06 m	118	364	(Hungary) OTP Bank-Pick Szeged
30	LB	Zoltán Szita	10 February 1998 (aged 26)	1.96 m	79	181	(Poland) Orlen Wisła Płock
32	GK	Kristóf Palasics	19 April 2002 (aged 22)	1.99 m	21	0	(Portugal) Benfica
33	RB	Gábor Ancsin	27 November 1990 (aged 34)	2.02 m	168	379	(Hungary) Ferencvárosi TC
39	LB	Richárd Bodó	13 March 1993 (aged 31)	2.03 m	119	355	(Hungary) OTP Bank-Pick Szeged
43	RB	Zoran Ilić	2 January 2002 (aged 23)	1.97 m	39	51	(Germany) HSV Hamburg
45	P	Miklós Rosta	14 February 1999 (aged 25)	2.03 m	70	200	(Romania) CS Dinamo București
61	GK	László Bartucz	5 November 1991 (aged 33)	1.94 m	33	0	(Hungary) MOL-Tatabánya KC
66	CB	Máté Lékai	16 June 1988 (aged 36)	1.90 m	187	561	(Hungary) Ferencvárosi TC
71	RB	Máté Ónodi-Jánoskúti	17 June 2002 (aged 22)	1.93 m	5	9	(Hungary) Ferencvárosi TC
77	CB	Egon Hanusz	25 September 1997 (aged 27)	1.77 m	55	83	(Portugal) Benfica
91	RW	Bence Imre	15 October 2002 (aged 22)	1.87 m	23	113	(Germany) THW Kiel

=== Netherlands ===
The squad was announced on 19 December 2024.

Head coach: (Sweden) Staffan Olsson

No.	Pos.	Name	Date of birth (age)	Height	App.	Goals	Club
1	GK	Bart Ravensbergen	14 March 1993 (aged 31)	1.90 m	105	17	(Germany) Frisch Auf Göppingen
2	GK	Rob Goudriaan	7 February 2001 (aged 23)	1.89 m	2	0	(Netherlands) RKHV Volendam
3	CB	Ivar Stavast	13 January 1998 (aged 27)	1.91 m	49	61	(Germany) HC Elbflorenz
5	LW	Rutger ten Velde	5 March 1997 (aged 27)	1.78 m	71	219	(Germany) Frisch Auf Göppingen
7	LB	Robin Schoenaker	23 August 1995 (aged 29)	1.96 m	59	8	(Belgium) Sporting Pelt
11	GK	Jorick Pol	26 February 2004 (aged 20)	1.98 m	0	0	(Netherlands) HV Hurry-Up
12	GK	Matthias Dorgelo	31 October 2002 (aged 22)	2.00 m	4	1	(Denmark) SønderjyskE Håndbold
15	P	Lars Kooij	11 August 2000 (aged 24)	2.00 m	27	39	(North Macedonia) RK Vardar
17	LW	Kaj Geenen	6 May 2003 (aged 21)	1.86 m	20	16	(Germany) VfL Lübeck-Schwartau
20	RB	Niels Versteijnen	3 February 2000 (aged 24)	2.00 m	49	107	(Germany) TBV Lemgo
21	P	Martijn Kleijkers	22 February 2001 (aged 23)	1.92 m	9	6	(France) Pau Billère Handball
22	CB	Luc Steins	22 March 1995 (aged 29)	1.72 m	111	319	(France) Paris Saint-Germain
23	LB	Jorn Smits	3 September 1992 (aged 32)	1.93 m	75	112	(Switzerland) GC Amicitia Zürich
27	RW	Alec Smit	15 May 1999 (aged 25)	1.85 m	60	71	(Switzerland) Pfadi Winterthur
31	RB	Kay Smits	31 March 1997 (aged 27)	1.85 m	82	383	(Germany) SG Flensburg-Handewitt
38	RW	Rob Schmeits	11 June 1994 (aged 30)	1.85 m	4	3	(Belgium) Sporting Pelt
40	RW	Robin Nagtegall	21 January 1999 (aged 25)	1.85 m	2	0	(Netherlands) RKHV Volendam
41	LW	Jeromy van der Ban	14 January 2002 (aged 23)	1.91 m	2	2	(Netherlands) HV Aalsmeer
77	CB	Dani Baijens	5 May 1998 (aged 26)	1.82 m	84	229	(France) Paris Saint-Germain

=== North Macedonia ===
A 20-player squad was announced on 19 December 2024.

Head coach: Kiril Lazarov

No.	Pos.	Name	Date of birth (age)	Height	App.	Goals	Club
1	GK	Nikola Mitrevski	3 October 1985 (aged 39)	1.79 m	140	6	(North Macedonia) RK Eurofarm Pelister
4	RB	Martin Velkovski	10 March 1997 (aged 27)	1.96 m	42	35	(North Macedonia) RK Alkaloid
9	CB	Igor Gjorgiev	2 June 2000 (aged 24)	1.88 m	24	32	(North Macedonia) RK Alkaloid
10	CB	Marko Mitev	23 February 2003 (aged 21)	1.73 m	12	26	(North Macedonia) RK Alkaloid
13	P	Valentin Karasmanakis	14 January 2005 (aged 20)	2.01 m	2	1	(North Macedonia) RK Alkaloid
16	GK	Ivan Galevski	5 July 2004 (aged 20)	1.97 m	0	0	(North Macedonia) RK Alkaloid
17	P	Nikola Markoski	22 May 1990 (aged 34)	1.97 m	86	49	(North Macedonia) RK Alkaloid
18	LB	Filip Kuzmanovski	3 July 1996 (aged 28)	1.97 m	75	231	(North Macedonia) RK Eurofarm Pelister
19	RW	Nenad Kosteski	4 March 2001 (aged 23)	1.83 m	33	65	(North Macedonia) RK Eurofarm Pelister
20	GK	Marko Kizikj	22 January 2001 (aged 23)	1.90 m	4	0	(North Macedonia) RK Alkaloid
21	RW	Aleksandar Petkovski	24 May 2004 (aged 20)	1.85 m	2	3	(North Macedonia) RK Alkaloid
33	P	Zharko Peshevski	11 April 1991 (aged 33)	1.85 m	78	173	(North Macedonia) RK Eurofarm Pelister
34	RB	Tomislav Jagurinovski	19 August 1998 (aged 26)	1.92 m	19	21	(North Macedonia) RK Vardar 1961
36	P	Milan Lazarevski	9 February 1997 (aged 27)	1.97 m	6	8	(North Macedonia) RK Vardar 1961
38	LW	Ivan Djonov	15 July 1997 (aged 27)	1.84 m	16	26	(North Macedonia) RK Alkaloid
42	P	Marko Stojkovikj	27 June 2003 (aged 21)	2.00 m	9	15	(North Macedonia) RK Alkaloid
55	LW	Petar Atanasijevikj	9 July 2003 (aged 21)	1.92 m	16	27	(North Macedonia) RK Eurofarm Pelister
77	RB	Martin Serafimov	3 March 2000 (aged 24)	1.95 m	36	71	(North Macedonia) RK Alkaloid
88	LB	Pavle Atanasijevikj	9 July 2003 (aged 21)	1.95 m	8	9	(North Macedonia) RK Eurofarm Pelister

== Group E ==
=== Brazil ===
A 24-player squad was announced on 20 December 2024. The final squad was announced on 6 January 2025.

Head coach: Marcus Oliveira

No.	Pos.	Name	Date of birth (age)	Height	App.	Goals	Club
7	LW	Joel Rodrigues	24 February 2001 (aged 23)	1.83 m	0	0	(Brazil) Praia Clube/Colégio Nacional
14	LB	Thiagus dos Santos	25 January 1989 (aged 35)	1.98 m	169	234	(Spain) FC Barcelona
15	LB	Leandro Monte da Silva	9 March 1998 (aged 26)	1.91 m	0	0	(Saudi Arabia) Mudhar
16	GK	Rangel da Rosa	11 May 1996 (aged 28)	1.89 m	51	3	(France) Saint-Raphaël Var Handball
26	LB	Bryan Monte	6 April 2003 (aged 21)	2.02 m	9	26	(France) Montpellier Handball
27	RW	Marcos da Silva	1 January 2001 (aged 24)	1.86 m	0	0	(Brazil) Pinheiros
37	LB	Haniel Langaro	7 March 1995 (aged 29)	1.97 m	93	398	(Romania) Dinamo București
47	P	Renan Pinheiro	19 April 2005 (aged 19)	2.02 m	0	0	(Brazil) Pinheiros
57	RB	Vinícios Carvalho	6 March 1997 (aged 27)	1.88 m	3	7	(France) C' Chartres Métropole Handball
75	CB	Denys Barros	2 January 1994 (aged 31)	1.86 m	0	0	(Spain) AD Ciudad de Guadalajara
77	RW	Rudolph Hackbarth	10 March 1994 (aged 30)	1.89 m	65	159	(Spain) BM Ciudad Encantada
80	P	Edney Oliveira	19 June 1998 (aged 26)	1.90 m	3	9	(Portugal) Sporting CP
82	CB	Tarcísio Oliveira	25 January 2000 (aged 24)	1.87 m	0	0	(Spain) BM Atlético Valladolid
88	P	Guilherme Borges	5 February 1999 (aged 25)	1.93 m	0	0	(France) Istres Provence Handball
94	CB	Acácio Filho	26 January 1994 (aged 30)	1.91 m	1	2	(Qatar) Al Arabi SC
95	RB	Gustavo Rodrigues	9 April 1995 (aged 29)	1.90 m	63	167	(France) Chambéry Handball
97	GK	Mateus Nascimento	7 October 1999 (aged 25)	1.88 m	4	0	(Brazil) Pinheiros
99	LW	Jean-Pierre Dupoux	16 August 1991 (aged 33)	1.80 m	12	41	Tremblay-en-France Handball

=== Norway ===
The squad was announced on 17 December 2024, but on 30 December August Pedersen replaced Alexander Blonz in the squad. On 23 January 2025, Kristian Sæverås replaced Sander Sagosen due to an injury.

Head coach: Jonas Wille

No.	Pos.	Name	Date of birth (age)	Height	App.	Goals	Club
3	DF	Vetle Eck Aga	4 October 1993 (aged 31)	1.90 m	60	4	(Norway) Kolstad Håndball
5	LB	Sander Sagosen	14 September 1995 (aged 29)	1.95 m	176	865	(Norway) Kolstad Håndball
6	LW	Sebastian Barthold	27 August 1991 (aged 33)	1.85 m	96	249	(Denmark) Aalborg Håndbold
11	P	Petter Øverby	26 March 1992 (aged 32)	1.94 m	147	156	(Germany) THW Kiel
12	GK	Kristian Sæverås	22 June 1996 (aged 28)	1.94 m	94	3	(Germany) SC DHfK Leipzig
14	CB	Mario Matic	23 July 1994 (aged 30)	1.91 m	8	12	(Greece) AEK H.C.
15	RB	Kent Robin Tønnesen	5 June 1991 (aged 33)	1.95 m	142	355	(France) Paris Saint-Germain Handball
18	LB	William Aar	23 October 1997 (aged 27)	1.98 m	23	22	(Denmark) TTH Holstebro
19	RW	Kristian Bjørnsen	10 January 1989 (aged 36)	1.92 m	209	741	(Denmark) Aalborg Håndbold
21	P	Magnus Gullerud	13 November 1991 (aged 33)	1.93 m	199	297	(Norway) Kolstad Håndball
22	CB	Tobias Grøndahl	22 January 2001 (aged 23)	1.82 m	46	131	(Denmark) GOG Håndbold
24	CB	Christian O'Sullivan (c)	22 August 1991 (aged 33)	1.90 m	202	297	(Germany) SC Magdeburg
30	GK	Torbjørn Bergerud	16 July 1994 (aged 30)	2.00 m	154	0	(Norway) Kolstad Håndball
31	RW	Kasper Lien	15 April 2001 (aged 23)	1.87 m	17	24	(Norway) Elverum Håndball
32	P	Thomas Solstad	26 February 1997 (aged 27)	1.94 m	36	69	(Germany) TSV Hannover-Burgdorf
36	GK	André Kristensen	15 March 2000 (aged 24)	1.92 m	5	0	(Portugal) Sporting CP
40	LW	August Pedersen	24 June 1994 (aged 30)	1.80 m	6	10	(Germany) SG Flensburg-Handewitt
43	LB	Simen Lyse	1 February 2000 (aged 24)	1.95 m	27	75	(Norway) Kolstad Håndball
77	RB	Magnus Abelvik Rød	7 July 1997 (aged 27)	2.04 m	90	208	(Hungary) SC Pick Szeged

=== Portugal ===
A 19-player squad was announced on 22 December 2024.

Head coach: Paulo Pereira

No.	Pos.	Name	Date of birth (age)	Height	App.	Goals	Club
4	RW	Pedro Portela	6 January 1990 (aged 35)	1.86 m	146	483	(Portugal) Sporting CP
8	P	Victor Iturriza	22 May 1990 (aged 34)	1.94 m	46	154	(Portugal) FC Porto
14	CB	Rui Silva	28 April 1993 (aged 31)	1.86 m	137	242	(Portugal) FC Porto
16	GK	Diogo Rêma Marques	17 March 2004 (aged 20)	1.90 m	18	0	(Portugal) FC Porto
21	LW	Leonel Fernandes	12 March 1998 (aged 26)	1.91 m	52	101	(Portugal) FC Porto
23	LW	Diogo Branquinho	25 July 1994 (aged 30)	1.85 m	94	203	(Portugal) Sporting CP
24	LB	Alexandre Cavalcanti	27 December 1996 (aged 28)	2.01 m	87	110	(Germany) MT Melsungen
25	RW	António Areia	21 June 1990 (aged 34)	1.90 m	99	285	Tremblay-en-France Handball
26	RB	Francisco Costa	16 February 2005 (aged 19)	1.83 m	30	101	(Portugal) Sporting CP
31	LB	Salvador Salvador	29 July 2001 (aged 23)	1.96 m	29	56	(Portugal) Sporting CP
41	GK	Gustavo Capdeville	31 August 1997 (aged 27)	1.90 m	54	0	(Portugal) SL Benfica
65	CB	André Sousa	3 March 2002 (aged 22)	1.86 m	7	13	(Portugal) ABC/UMinho
66	RB	João Gomes	6 September 2002 (aged 22)	1.78 m	2	3	(Portugal) Sporting CP
79	CB	Martim Costa	27 September 2002 (aged 22)	1.88 m	28	111	(Portugal) Sporting CP
80	CB	Miguel Oliveira	13 January 2004 (aged 21)	2.00 m	0	0	(Portugal) FC Porto
82	P	Luís Frade	11 September 1998 (aged 26)	1.94 m	72	160	(Spain) FC Barcelona
86	P	Ricardo Brandão	28 April 2004 (aged 20)	1.98 m	7	11	(Portugal) FC Porto
88	LB	Fábio Magalhães	12 March 1988 (aged 36)	1.94 m	183	351	(Portugal) FC Porto

=== United States ===
A 28-player squad was announced on 14 November 2024. The final squad was announced on 14 January 2025.

Head coach: (Sweden) Robert Hedin

No.	Pos.	Name	Date of birth (age)	Height	App.	Goals	Club
1	GK	Pál Merkovszky	5 May 2000 (aged 24)	1.95 m	10	1	(Hungary) Budai Farkasok KKUK
3	RW	Sean Corning	27 November 1996 (aged 28)	1.81 m	8	8	(Spain) CB Málaga
4	CB	Benjamin Edwards	1 September 2006 (aged 18)	1.88 m	12	72	(Hungary) Veszprém Handball Academy
6	RB	Jonas Strömberg	27 August 2001 (aged 23)	1.91 m	12	20	(Sweden) Lugi HF
7	CB	Alex Chan	26 April 1993 (aged 31)	1.88 m	10	40	(Spain) Club Cisne de Balonmano
8	P	Paul Skorupa	7 September 1999 (aged 25)	1.93 m	14	0	(Germany) VfL Lübeck-Schwartau
9	LB	Gary Hines	21 March 1984 (aged 40)	1.80 m	81	709	(Germany) SG Langenfeld
10	CB	Daniel Hunyadi	20 November 2003 (aged 21)	1.92 m	0	0	(Hungary) Ferencvárosi TC
11	LB	Aboubakar Fofana	26 July 1996 (aged 28)	1.98 m	110	137	(France) Villeurbanne Handball
14	CB	Ian Hueter	22 October 1997 (aged 27)	1.96 m	32	80	(Germany) TSV Bayer Dormagen
15	LW	Lukas Hansen	14 June 2002 (aged 22)	1.87 m	0	0	(Denmark) HØJ Elite
16	GK	Douglas Otterström	16 May 2001 (aged 23)	1.85 m	2	0	(Sweden) Tyresö HF
17	P	Andrew Donlin	9 October 1992 (aged 32)	2.02 m	40	65	(United States) San Francisco CalHeat
20	RW	Rodrigo Campos	7 October 2004 (aged 20)	1.90 m	6	20	(Spain) Balonmano Cuatro Valles
25	P	Patrick Hueter	24 July 1995 (aged 29)	1.96 m	18	60	(Germany) TSV Bayer Dormagen
31	RB	Tristan Morawski	12 March 2005 (aged 19)	2.02 m	10	0	(Poland) Sandra SPA Pogoń Szczecin
33	LW	Samuel Hoddersen	10 June 1997 (aged 27)	1.83 m	35	48	(Germany) HSG Rodgau Nieder-Roden
34	P	Domagoj Sršen	31 December 1990 (aged 34)	2.02 m	16	3	(Croatia) RK Metković

== Group F ==
=== Chile ===
A 22-player squad was announced on 27 December 2024. The final roster was revealed on 14 January 2025.

Head coach: (Spain) Aitor Etxaburu

No.	Pos.	Name	Date of birth (age)	Height	App.	Goals	Club
1	GK	Vicente González	30 September 1999 (aged 25)	1.92 m	34	0	(Italy) Secchia Rubiera
4	LB	Erwin Feuchtmann	2 May 1990 (aged 34)	1.90 m	93	515	(France) Fenix Toulouse Handball
6	CB	Arian Delgado	25 August 2001 (aged 23)	1.80 m	12	12	(Chile) Liceo Nacional de Maipú
7	LW	Rodrigo Aedo	7 May 2000 (aged 24)	1.77 m	0	0	(Chile) Balonmano USAB
9	P	Javier Frelijj	28 January 1991 (aged 33)	1.91 m	85	108	(Spain) CBM San José Obrero
11	P	Esteban Salinas	18 January 1992 (aged 32)	1.83 m	100	369	(Spain) CD Bidasoa
12	GK	Felipe García	26 October 1993 (aged 31)	1.90 m	73	4	(Spain) BM Zamora
14	P	Benjamín Illesca	4 February 2000 (aged 24)	1.96 m	14	10	(Spain) CBM Gáldar
17	RB	Rodrigo Salinas	25 February 1989 (aged 35)	1.89 m	122	425	(Spain) CD Bidasoa
18	CB	Cristóbal Oyarzún	30 June 2004 (aged 20)	1.92 m	0	0	(Spain) BM Santoña
22	CB	Matias Payá	31 March 2000 (aged 24)	1.76 m	7	8	(Spain) Balonmano Sinfín
25	RB	Joshua Mesías	27 April 2002 (aged 22)	1.88 m	0	0	(Sweden) IFK Karlskrona
28	RW	Luciano Scaramelli	23 April 2002 (aged 22)	1.82 m	0	0	(Italy) Pallamano Conversano
30	RB	Daniel Ayala	30 December 1995 (aged 29)	1.77 m	54	92	(Chile) Balonmano USAB
32	LW	Danilo Salgado	1 June 1998 (aged 26)	1.79 m	9	12	(Spain) BM Pozuelo de Cva.
55	RW	Francisco Ahumada	19 July 2001 (aged 23)	1.74 m	7	25	(Spain) Balonmano Nava

=== Japan ===
The squad was announced on 25 December 2024.

Head coach: (Spain) Toni Gerona

No.	Pos.	Name	Date of birth (age)	Height	App.	Goals	Club
1	GK	Takumi Nakamura	2 August 1996 (aged 28)	1.90 m	43	1	(Japan) Toyoda Gosei Blue Falcon
9	LW	Naoki Sugioka	18 April 1994 (aged 30)	1.77 m	74	145	(Japan) Toyota Auto Body Brave Kings
11	RB	Tsubasa Nakamura	15 October 1999 (aged 25)	1.80 m	4	3	(Japan) Zeekstar Tokyo
19	RB	Shinnosuke Tokuda	6 December 1995 (aged 29)	1.78 m	101	312	(Qatar) Al Duhail
21	GK	Daisuke Okamoto	29 March 1995 (aged 29)	1.91 m	16	0	(Japan) Toyota Auto Body Brave Kings
24	CB	Asumi Kitazume	22 October 1996 (aged 28)	1.86 m	28	25	(Japan) Toyota Auto Body Brave Kings
26	LW	Seito Yano	15 May 1999 (aged 25)	1.87 m	2	2	(Japan) Toyoda Gosei Blue Falcon
27	P	Hiroyasu Tamakawa	27 April 1995 (aged 29)	2.00 m	95	89	(Japan) Zeekstar Tokyo
31	LB	Tatsuki Yoshino	13 July 1994 (aged 30)	1.83 m	82	276	(Japan) Toyota Auto Body Brave Kings
38	LB	Kotaro Mizumachi	13 March 1995 (aged 29)	1.83 m	22	40	(Japan) Toyoda Gosei Blue Falcon
39	CB	Naoki Fujisaka	1 July 2002 (aged 22)	1.80 m	7	31	(Japan) Nippon Sport Science University
51	RW	Kota Nakata	7 July 1999 (aged 25)	1.69 m	2	9	(Japan) Toyota Boshoku Kyushu Red Tornado Saga
56	RB	Ren Arase	6 November 2002 (aged 22)	1.74 m	0	0	(Japan) Osaka University of Health and Sport Sciences
57	P	Nikita Nakaoki	24 June 2004 (aged 20)	1.92 m	0	0	(Japan) Nippon Sport Science University
64	GK	Go Kawashima	13 March 2001 (aged 23)	1.88 m	2	0	Toyota Motor East Japan Regarosso Miyagi
67	RB	Shu Ishimine	12 November 2000 (aged 24)	1.81 m	2	2	(Japan) Toyoda Gosei Blue Falcon
68	P	Soya Ichihara	24 August 1999 (aged 25)	1.89 m	2	1	(Japan) Toyoda Gosei Blue Falcon
70	LB	Naoki Yamaguchi	25 September 2000 (aged 24)	1.88 m	0	0	(Japan) Toyota Boshoku Kyushu Red Tornado Saga

=== Spain ===
A 19-player squad was announced on 27 December 2024. The final roster was revealed on 12 January 2025.

Head coach: Jordi Ribera

No.	Pos.	Name	Date of birth (age)	Height	App.	Goals	Club
1	GK	Gonzalo Pérez de Vargas	10 January 1991 (aged 34)	1.89 m	193	18	(Spain) FC Barcelona
7	CB	Jan Gurri	10 June 2002 (aged 22)	1.90 m	13	16	(Portugal) Sporting CP
8	CB	Agustín Casado	21 May 1996 (aged 28)	1.90 m	62	166	(Hungary) Telekom Veszprém
9	CB	Ian Tarrafeta	4 January 1999 (aged 26)	1.88 m	61	140	(France) Pays d'Aix Université Club
10	RB	Alex Dujshebaev	17 December 1992 (aged 32)	1.88 m	166	481	(Poland) Industria Kielce
14	RW	Ferran Solé	25 August 1992 (aged 32)	1.93 m	113	429	(France) Paris Saint-Germain
15	CB	Petar Cikusa	8 December 2005 (aged 19)	1.88 m	8	9	(Spain) FC Barcelona
18	RB	Imanol Garciandia	30 April 1995 (aged 29)	2.01 m	66	166	(Hungary) OTP Bank-Pick Szeged
20	P	Abel Serdio	16 April 1994 (aged 30)	1.95 m	56	111	(Poland) Orlen Wisła Płock
24	LB	Daniel Dujshebaev	4 July 1997 (aged 27)	1.97 m	102	224	(Poland) Industria Kielce
25	GK	Sergey Hernández	17 June 1995 (aged 29)	1.98 m	59	11	(Germany) SC Magdeburg
34	RW	Carlos Álvarez Domínguez	6 February 2003 (aged 21)	1.82 m	2	6	(Spain) CB Ademar León
37	P	Víctor Romero	9 March 2004 (aged 20)	1.93 m	5	5	(Spain) BM Granollers
51	LW	Miguel Sánchez-Migallón	8 February 1995 (aged 29)	2.02 m	63	37	(Portugal) SL Benfica
70	LW	Daniel Fernández	28 March 2001 (aged 23)	1.76 m	51	181	(Germany) TVB Stuttgart
78	RB	Djordje Cikusa	8 December 2005 (aged 19)	1.91 m	8	15	(France) Montpellier Handball
80	LW	Ian Barrufet	19 May 2004 (aged 20)	1.94 m	3	5	(Germany) MT Melsungen
99	P	Javier Rodríguez Moreno	22 July 2002 (aged 22)	1.98 m	19	31	(Spain) FC Barcelona

=== Sweden ===
A 17-player squad was announced on 18 December 2024.

Head coach: Michael Apelgren

No.	Pos.	Name	Date of birth (age)	Height	App.	Goals	Club
2	LB	Jonathan Carlsbogård	19 April 1995 (aged 29)	1.95 m	79	156	(Spain) FC Barcelona
6	P	Felix Möller	4 September 2002 (aged 22)	1.97 m	22	29	(Denmark) Aalborg Håndbold
10	RW	Niclas Ekberg	23 December 1988 (aged 36)	1.91 m	212	845	(Sweden) Ystads IF
12	GK	Andreas Palicka	10 July 1986 (aged 38)	1.89 m	168	19	(France) Paris Saint-Germain
13	RW	Sebastian Karlsson	21 January 1995 (aged 29)	1.78 m	25	72	(France) Montpellier Handball
15	LW	Hampus Wanne	10 December 1993 (aged 31)	1.85 m	106	434	(Spain) FC Barcelona
16	GK	Tobias Thulin	5 July 1995 (aged 29)	1.98 m	69	0	(Hungary) Pick Szeged
22	LW	Lucas Pellas	28 August 1995 (aged 29)	1.83 m	80	256	(France) Montpellier Handball
23	RB	Albin Lagergren	11 September 1992 (aged 32)	1.86 m	120	356	(Germany) SC Magdeburg
24	CB	Jim Gottfridsson	2 September 1992 (aged 32)	1.91 m	164	517	(Germany) SG Flensburg-Handewitt
28	CB	Jonathan Edvardsson	7 April 1997 (aged 27)	1.90 m	29	18	(Germany) TSV Hannover-Burgdorf
29	RB	Edwin Aspenbäck	7 August 2000 (aged 24)	1.96 m	4	3	(Denmark) TTH Holstebro
33	RB	Lukas Sandell	3 February 1997 (aged 27)	1.93 m	66	166	(Hungary) Telekom Veszprém
35	P	Andreas Nilsson	12 April 1990 (aged 34)	1.97 m	155	351	(Sweden) Önnereds HK
42	LB	Eric Johansson	28 June 2000 (aged 24)	1.97 m	40	110	(Germany) THW Kiel
45	LB	Olle Forsell Schefvert	13 August 1993 (aged 31)	1.96 m	7	4	(Germany) Rhein Neckar Löwen
51	GK	Fabian Norsten	11 July 2000 (aged 24)	1.96 m	7	0	(Denmark) Aalborg Håndbold

== Group G ==
=== Cape Verde ===
A 20-player squad was announced on 20 December 2024. The final roster was revealed on 14 January 2025.

Head coach: (Portugal) Jorge Rito

No.	Pos.	Name	Date of birth (age)	Height	App.	Goals	Club
1	GK	Élcio Fernandes	23 September 1996 (aged 28)	1.96 m	16	0	(Spain) CB Burgos
2	RB	Edmilson García	27 July 1998 (aged 26)	1.85 m	0	0	(Portugal) Associação Artistica de Avanca
3	LB	Délcio Pina	27 March 1992 (aged 32)	1.98 m	40	31	(Portugal) Madeira Andebol SAD
4	P	Ivo Santos	28 April 1992 (aged 32)	2.00 m	28	1	(Germany) Bergischer HC
5	LB	Edmilson Araújo	6 January 1994 (aged 31)	1.87 m	6	12	(France) Istres Provence Handball
6	CB	Leandro Semedo	24 December 1994 (aged 30)	1.94 m	47	19	Kuwait SC
8	RB	Hafsteinn Ramos	29 February 2000 (aged 24)	1.90 m	0	0	(Iceland) Íþróttafélagið Grótta
10	RB	Bruno Landim	6 April 1993 (aged 31)	1.93 m	24	24	(Saudi Arabia) Al-Taraji Club
11	RW	Admilson Furtado	30 September 1995 (aged 29)	1.77 m	22	18	(Iceland) Knattspyrnufélagið Hörður
12	GK	Edmilson Gonçalves	26 December 1993 (aged 31)	1.89 m	13	1	(Portugal) Boa-Hora
13	P	Paulo Moreno	8 May 1992 (aged 32)	1.97 m	10	28	(France) C' Chartres Métropole Handball
14	LW	Alexandre Pereira	1 July 1994 (aged 30)	1.86 m	20	2	(Portugal) C.F. Os Belenenses
15	LW	Gilson Correia	23 April 1995 (aged 29)	1.75 m	13	1	(Luxembourg) CHEV Diekirch
16	GK	Bruno Fernandes	20 September 2001 (aged 23)	1.92 m	3	0	(Portugal) IFC Torrense
17	RB	Rafael Andrade	1 March 1996 (aged 28)	1.96 m	34	0	(Portugal) Vitória
44	CB	Gualther Furtado	6 February 1995 (aged 29)	1.85 m	31	21	(Spain) Club Cisne de Balonmano
48	RW	Malvino Varela	20 January 2003 (aged 21)	1.77 m	0	0	(Cape Verde) Girassol
55	CB	Isaías Sousa	6 December 2003 (aged 21)	1.75 m	0	0	(Cape Verde) Associação Asa Stars

=== Cuba ===
The squad was announced on 7 January 2025.

Head coach: Luis Martínez

No.	Pos.	Name	Date of birth (age)	Height	App.	Goals	Club
1	GK	Adan Calzada	3 September 1998 (aged 26)	1.94 m	15	3	(Croatia) MRK Čakovec
2	LB	Ronaldo Almeida	20 August 2002 (aged 22)	1.94 m	35	85	(France) US Ivry Handball
7	LW	Frank Cordies	3 June 2000 (aged 24)	1.93 m	27	105	(Spain) BM Huesca
9	RW	Osmani Miniet	5 September 2006 (aged 18)	1.81 m	0	0	(Cuba) Club Artemisa
10	LW	Hanser Rodríguez	5 May 2000 (aged 24)	1.88 m	36	74	(North Macedonia) RK Vardar
11	CB	Christopher Martinez	24 November 2000 (aged 24)	1.82 m	15	28	(Portugal) ABC/UMinho
12	GK	Esniel Negret	28 January 2003 (aged 21)	1.93 m	0	0	Santiago De Cuba
13	RW	Victor Dawkins	3 April 2001 (aged 23)	1.86 m	10	21	(Portugal) C.S. Marítimo
14	LW	Maiko Vázquez	3 September 2003 (aged 21)	1.94 m	20	61	(Portugal) Sporting CP
16	GK	Magnol Suárez	10 August 1994 (aged 30)	2.00 m	32	6	(Spain) L'Arancina Handbol Mallorca
19	CB	Samuel Cordies	2 November 2002 (aged 22)	1.91 m	25	77	(Spain) BM Huesca
21	P	Claudio Ramos	28 July 1998 (aged 26)	1.95 m	15	38	(Spain) BM Puente Genil
23	LW	Lafontan Freddy	12 May 2005 (aged 19)	1.95 m	5	5	(Portugal) FC Porto
27	P	Eduardo Valiente	15 August 1991 (aged 33)	1.97 m	20	31	(Cuba) Erromoko Eskubaloia
32	LW	Dariel García	31 December 1996 (aged 28)	1.97 m	21	36	(Spain) CD Bidasoa
91	RB	Adonis García	4 May 1993 (aged 31)	1.89 m	33	66	(Spain) CB Alarcos Ciudad Real

=== Iceland ===
The squad was announced on 19 December 2024.

Head coach: Snorri Guðjónsson

No.	Pos.	Name	Date of birth (age)	Height	App.	Goals	Club
1	GK	Björgvin Páll Gústavsson	24 May 1985 (aged 39)	1.93 m	273	24	(Iceland) Valur
2	RW	Óðinn Þór Ríkharðsson	23 October 1997 (aged 27)	1.83 m	42	130	(Switzerland) Kadetten Schaffhausen
3	CB	Janus Daði Smárason	1 January 1995 (aged 30)	1.86 m	86	146	(Hungary) Pick Szeged
4	LB	Aron Pálmarsson	19 July 1990 (aged 34)	1.93 m	177	674	(Hungary) Telekom Veszprém
5	P	Sveinn Jóhannsson	16 June 1999 (aged 25)	1.95 m	14	24	(Norway) Kolstad Håndball
7	RB	Viggó Kristjánsson	9 December 1993 (aged 31)	1.89 m	59	165	(Germany) SC DHfK Leipzig
8	LW	Bjarki Már Elísson	16 May 1990 (aged 34)	1.91 m	118	401	(Hungary) Telekom Veszprém
9	CB	Elvar Örn Jónsson	31 August 1997 (aged 27)	1.80 m	79	183	(Germany) MT Melsungen
10	CB	Gísli Þorgeir Kristjánsson	30 July 1999 (aged 25)	1.91 m	62	139	(Germany) SC Magdeburg
11	P	Ýmir Örn Gíslason	1 July 1997 (aged 27)	1.95 m	92	36	(Germany) Frisch Auf Göppingen
15	LB	Þorsteinn Leó Gunnarsson	13 November 2002 (aged 22)	2.08 m	5	10	(Portugal) FC Porto
16	GK	Viktor Gísli Hallgrímsson	24 July 2000 (aged 24)	2.03 m	60	1	(Poland) Orlen Wisła Płock
17	LW	Stiven Tobar Valencia	27 October 2000 (aged 24)	1.82 m	17	18	(Portugal) Benfica
18	P	Elliði Snær Viðarsson	15 November 1998 (aged 26)	1.91 m	50	109	(Germany) VfL Gummersbach
19	LW	Orri Freyr Þorkelsson	25 June 1999 (aged 25)	1.83 m	16	41	(Portugal) Sporting CP
22	RW	Sigvaldi Guðjónsson	4 July 1994 (aged 30)	1.92 m	76	214	(Norway) Kolstad Håndball
24	RB	Teitur Örn Einarsson	23 September 1998 (aged 26)	1.90 m	36	36	(Germany) VfL Gummersbach
25	CB	Haukur Þrastarson	14 April 2001 (aged 23)	1.91 m	35	50	(Romania) Dinamo București
27	LB	Einar Þorsteinn Ólafsson	30 September 2001 (aged 23)	1.97 m	14	5	(Denmark) Fredericia HK

=== Slovenia ===
A 20-player squad was announced on 2 January 2025.

Head coach: Uroš Zorman

No.	Pos.	Name	Date of birth (age)	Height	App.	Goals	Club
1	GK	Jože Baznik	24 May 1993 (aged 31)	1.87 m	22	2	(France) Pays d'Aix Université Club
3	P	Blaž Blagotinšek	17 January 1994 (aged 30)	2.02 m	146	252	(Germany) SG Flensburg-Handewitt
5	LB	Nik Henigman	4 December 1995 (aged 29)	2.01 m	84	115	(France) C' Chartres Métropole Handball
8	RW	Blaž Janc	20 November 1996 (aged 28)	1.86 m	113	422	(Spain) FC Barcelona
11	RB	Jure Dolenec	6 December 1988 (aged 36)	1.91 m	206	716	(Croatia) RK Nexe Našice
17	RB	Nejc Cehte	4 September 1992 (aged 32)	1.96 m	79	142	(North Macedonia) RK Eurofarm Pelister
18	RB	Tadej Kljun	18 April 2001 (aged 23)	1.96 m	9	13	(Hungary) Balatonfüredi KSE
19	LW	Staš Slatinek Jovičić	6 December 2000 (aged 24)	1.85 m	36	71	(Slovenia) RD Slovan
20	LW	Tilen Kodrin	14 May 1994 (aged 30)	1.92 m	97	169	(Germany) VfL Gummersbach
23	CB	Miha Zarabec	12 October 1991 (aged 33)	1.78 m	114	236	(Poland) Orlen Wisła Płock
26	GK	Klemen Ferlin	26 June 1989 (aged 35)	1.92 m	84	2	(Poland) Industria Kielce
27	P	Kristjan Horžen	8 December 1999 (aged 25)	1.92 m	54	78	(Germany) VfL Gummersbach
34	CB	Rok Ovniček	29 January 1995 (aged 29)	1.85 m	53	68	(France) HBC Nantes
35	CB	Domen Makuc	1 July 2000 (aged 24)	1.88 m	24	66	(Spain) FC Barcelona
45	P	Miha Kavčič	19 June 1998 (aged 26)	1.92 m	3	0	(Serbia) RK Vojvodina
51	LB	Borut Mačkovšek	11 September 1992 (aged 32)	2.04 m	153	402	(Hungary) OTP Bank-Pick Szeged
77	RW	Domen Novak	26 April 1998 (aged 26)	1.81 m	50	90	(Germany) HSG Wetzlar
88	LB	Aleks Vlah	22 July 1997 (aged 27)	1.91 m	56	234	(Denmark) Aalborg Håndbold
90	GK	Urban Lesjak	24 August 1990 (aged 34)	1.87 m	97	0	(Slovenia) RK Trimo Trebnje

== Group H ==
=== Argentina ===
A 21-player squad was announced on 9 December 2024. The final roster was revealed on 12 January 2025.

Head coach: Rodolfo Jung

No.	Pos.	Name	Date of birth (age)	Height	App.	Goals	Club
1	GK	Santiago Giovagnola	28 December 1999 (aged 25)	1.83 m	2	0	(Spain) Balonmano Caserio
3	LB	Santiago Barceló	5 September 2002 (aged 22)	1.91 m	19	28	(Spain) BM Ciudad Encantada
4	CB	Nicolás Bono	16 August 1997 (aged 27)	1.80 m	32	53	(France) Istres Provence
7	LB	Juan Gull	19 May 2004 (aged 20)	2.06 m	27	75	(Brazil) Pinheiros
9	LB	Tomás Cañete	14 January 1999 (aged 26)	1.88 m	2	2	(Italy) SSV Brixen Handball
10	LW	Ramiro Benacedo	21 March 2002 (aged 22)	1.88 m	7	22	(Argentina) Colegio Ward
11	P	Lucas Moscariello	19 February 1992 (aged 32)	1.90 m	115	246	(Spain) BM Benidorm
18	P	Guillermo Fischer	18 July 1996 (aged 28)	2.00 m	63	51	(Spain) BM Villa de Aranda
19	CB	Pedro Martínez Cami	20 December 1999 (aged 25)	1.90 m	68	140	(Portugal) Sporting CP
20	RW	Ramiro Martínez	22 July 1995 (aged 29)	1.81 m	65	166	(Spain) BM Benidorm
23	CB	Martín Jung	3 September 2002 (aged 22)	1.88 m	9	23	(France) US Ivry Handball
25	RW	Facundo Cangiani	23 April 1991 (aged 33)	1.82 m	59	84	(Spain) Balonmano Torrelavega
27	P	Pablo Minguez	24 January 1991 (aged 33)	1.92 m	0	0	(Italy) ASV Eppan
28	RW	Juan Saco	28 January 2002 (aged 22)	1.89 m	10	28	(Spain) CB Triana
40	GK	Leonel Maciel	4 January 1989 (aged 36)	1.92 m	140	17	(Spain) CD Bidasoa
77	RB	Lucas Aizen	5 February 1998 (aged 26)	1.91 m	24	39	(Spain) BM Puente Genil

=== Bahrain ===
The squad was announced on 7 January 2025.

Head coach: (Iceland) Aron Kristjánsson

No.	Pos.	Name	Date of birth (age)	Height	App.	Goals	Club
3	P	Ali Abdulla Eid	18 January 1991 (aged 33)	1.74 m	88	165	(Bahrain) Al-Najma
9	LW	Hasan Al-Samahiji	22 February 1991 (aged 33)	1.78 m	95	270	(Bahrain) Al Dair Sports Club
10	LB	Mohamed Rabia	14 January 2003 (aged 22)	1.86 m	30	35	(Bahrain) Al-Ahli
12	GK	Hesham Isa	5 January 2003 (aged 22)	1.91 m	26	15	(Bahrain) Al Dair Sports Club
14	RW	Qasim Qambar	21 August 2001 (aged 23)	1.75 m	36	56	(Bahrain) Al-Ahli
17	LB	Ahmed Kadhem	9 May 2003 (aged 21)	1.92 m	10	12	(Bahrain) Al-Shabab
19	P	Mohamed Ali	17 April 1987 (aged 37)	1.91 m	118	87	(Bahrain) Al-Najma
22	RW	Husain Ali	2 July 2001 (aged 23)	1.76 m	5	1	(Bahrain) Al Dair Sports Club
23	CB	Mujtaba Al-Zaimoor	8 May 2000 (aged 24)	1.77 m	26	44	(Bahrain) Al-Shabab
24	LB	Abdulla Abdulkarim	25 January 2002 (aged 22)	1.84 m	10	9	(Bahrain) Al-Shabab
29	LB	Abdulla Al-Zaimoor	6 October 1998 (aged 26)	1.81 m	51	65	(Bahrain) Al-Shabab
77	RB	Jassim Khamis	2 September 2002 (aged 22)	1.78 m	11	5	(Bahrain) Al-Shabab
89	P	Mahmood Al-Falahi	16 March 2004 (aged 20)	1.84 m	10	15	(Bahrain) Tubli Sports Club
90	RB	Ali Abdulla	5 August 2002 (aged 22)	1.85 m	15	35	(Bahrain) Al Tadamun Club
91	LW	Ali Al-Asheeri	13 April 2002 (aged 22)	1.80 m	15	30	(Bahrain) Al Dair Sports Club
93	RB	Mohamed Habib	20 July 1993 (aged 31)	1.86 m	203	126	(Bahrain) Al-Najma
95	CB	Mohamed Habib Naser	7 February 2001 (aged 23)	1.79 m	76	144	(Bahrain) Al-Najma
97	GK	Mohamed Ali	12 August 1989 (aged 35)	1.90 m	240	15	(Bahrain) Al-Najma

=== Croatia ===
A 22-player squad was announced on 30 December 2024. The final roster was revealed on 14 January 2025.

Head coach: (Iceland) Dagur Sigurðsson

No.	Pos.	Name	Date of birth (age)	Height	App.	Goals	Club
1	GK	Dominik Kuzmanović	15 August 2002 (aged 22)	1.93 m	28	1	(Germany) VfL Gummersbach
5	CB	Domagoj Duvnjak	1 June 1988 (aged 36)	1.98 m	263	785	(Germany) THW Kiel
6	RW	Mario Šoštarič	25 November 1992 (aged 32)	1.93 m	27	110	(Hungary) OTP Bank-Pick Szeged
9	RB	Luka Lovre Klarica	25 September 2001 (aged 23)	1.97 m	33	78	(Croatia) RK Zagreb
10	P	Josip Šimić	10 May 2000 (aged 24)	1.94 m	0	0	(Germany) 1. VfL Potsdam
11	LB	Zvonimir Srna	18 January 1998 (aged 26)	2.02 m	35	83	(Croatia) RK Zagreb
13	CB	Ivano Pavlović	19 March 2003 (aged 21)	1.91 m	1	1	(Croatia) RK Zagreb
18	CB	Igor Karačić	2 November 1988 (aged 36)	1.91 m	124	303	(Poland) KS Kielce
20	RB	Mateo Maraš	17 December 2000 (aged 24)	2.03 m	27	40	(Hungary) Tatabánya KC
30	LB	Marko Mamić	6 March 1994 (aged 30)	2.02 m	89	123	(Germany) SC DHfK Leipzig
33	CB	Luka Cindrić	5 July 1993 (aged 31)	1.81 m	119	339	(Hungary) Veszprém KC
35	GK	Ivan Pešić	17 March 1989 (aged 35)	1.94 m	66	1	(France) HBC Nantes
39	LW	David Mandić	14 September 1997 (aged 27)	1.89 m	57	141	(Germany) MT Melsungen
41	CB	Tin Lučin	16 August 1999 (aged 25)	1.97 m	39	96	(Croatia) RK Nexe Našice
51	RB	Ivan Martinović	6 January 1998 (aged 27)	1.94 m	51	233	(Germany) Rhein-Neckar Löwen
52	P	Leon Šušnja	5 August 1993 (aged 31)	2.04 m	23	22	(Poland) Orlen Wisła Płock
53	P	Marin Šipić	29 April 1996 (aged 28)	1.90 m	77	143	(Switzerland) HC Kriens-Luzern
57	RW	Filip Glavaš	6 May 1997 (aged 27)	1.84 m	42	133	(Croatia) RK Zagreb
62	LW	Marin Jelinić	7 December 1996 (aged 28)	1.94 m	40	102	(Hungary) OTP Bank-Pick Szeged
93	P	Veron Načinović	7 March 2000 (aged 24)	2.04 m	38	84	(France) Montpellier Handball

=== Egypt ===
The squad was announced on 10 January 2025.

Head coach: (Spain) Juan Carlos Pastor

No.	Pos.	Name	Date of birth (age)	Height	App.	Goals	Club
5	RB	Yahia Omar	9 September 1997 (aged 27)	1.95 m	68	252	(France) Paris Saint-Germain
7	CB	Seif Hany	10 June 2000 (aged 24)	1.84 m	0	0	(Egypt) Al Ahly
10	LB	Abdelrahman Abdou	30 January 1996 (aged 28)	1.96 m	21	25	(Egypt) Al Ahly
15	LB	Ahmed Hesham	15 May 2000 (aged 24)	1.91 m	64	94	(France) Montpellier Handball
17	CB	Ahmed Khairy	15 September 1994 (aged 30)	1.88 m	20	21	(Egypt) Al Ahly
20	LW	Belal Massoud	8 February 2004 (aged 20)	1.82 m	0	0	(Egypt) Al Ahly
21	P	Mohamed Tarek	15 January 2002 (aged 22)	2.02 m	6	2	(Egypt) Zamalek
24	P	Ibrahim El-Masry	11 March 1989 (aged 35)	1.96 m	274	84	(Egypt) Al Ahly
45	CB	Seif El-Deraa	19 September 1998 (aged 26)	1.87 m	64	113	(France) Limoges Handball
53	RW	Akram Yosri	22 November 1994 (aged 30)	1.80 m	54	152	(Egypt) Zamalek
55	RB	Mohsen Ramadan	11 March 1998 (aged 26)	1.92 m	46	88	(Egypt) Al Ahly
74	P	Yasser Abdelwahed	8 December 2000 (aged 24)	1.94 m	0	0	(Egypt) Al Ahly
79	LW	Ahmed Nafea	1 September 1997 (aged 27)	1.82 m	5	32	(Serbia) RK Vojvodina
80	P	Ahmed Adel	25 November 1994 (aged 30)	1.84 m	33	53	(Egypt) Al Ahly
88	GK	Karim Handawy	1 May 1988 (aged 36)	1.88 m	181	2	(Egypt) Zamalek
90	LB	Ali Zein	14 December 1990 (aged 34)	1.93 m	316	480	(Romania) CS Dinamo București
91	RW	Mohamed Sanad	16 January 1991 (aged 33)	1.88 m	177	430	(France) USAM Nîmes Gard
92	GK	Mohamed Aly	13 November 1992 (aged 32)	1.90 m	21	0	(Portugal) Sporting CP
