= Philipp Weber =

German handball player (born 1992)

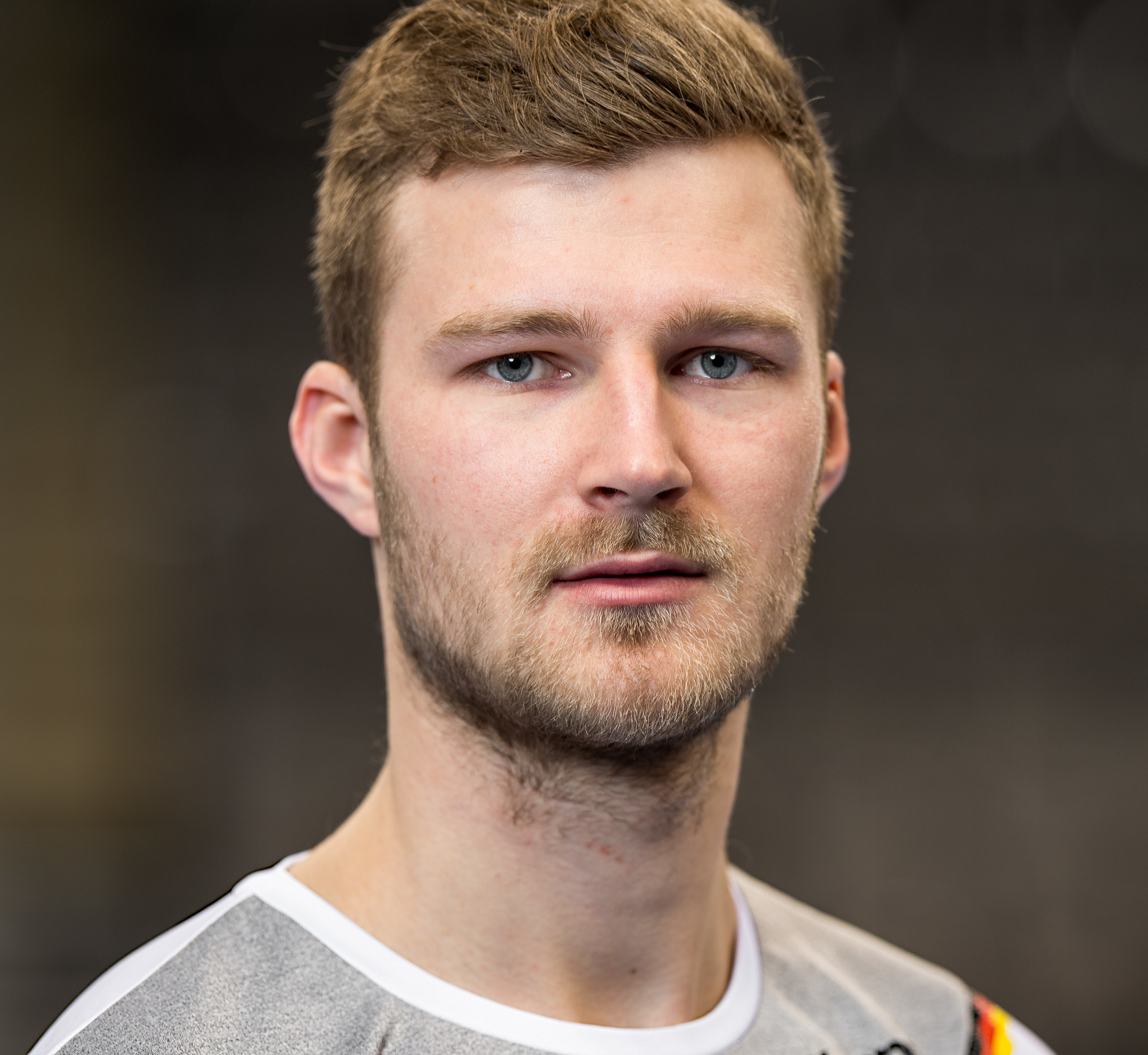
- Weber in 2018

Personal information
- Nationality: German
- Born: 15 September 1992 (age 34) Schönebeck, Germany
- Height: 1.94 m (6 ft 4 in)

Sport
- Sport: Handball
- Position: Left back
- Current club: SC Magdeburg

Youth career
- Years: Team
- 1999–2003: SG Eintracht Glinde
- 2003–2010: SC Magdeburg

Senior clubs
- Years: Team
- 2010–2012: SC Magdeburg Youngsters
- 2012–2013: SC Magdeburg
- 2013–2016: SC DHfK Leipzig
- 2016–2017: HSG Wetzlar
- 2017–2021: SC DHfK Leipzig
- 2021–: SC Magdeburg
National team
Years	Team	Apps	(Gls)
2017–	Germany	81	(171)
- Updated on 18. January 2024

Philipp Weber (born 15 September 1992) is a German handballer for SC Magdeburg and the German national team.

In the 2016-17 season he was the topscorer in the German Bundesliga with 223 goals in 34 matches. His team, HSG Wetzlar, achieved their highest ever league position that season, when they finished 6th.

== Individual awards ==
- Handball-Bundesliga Top Scorer: 2016-17
