= Tomáš Piroch =

Czech handball player (born 2000)

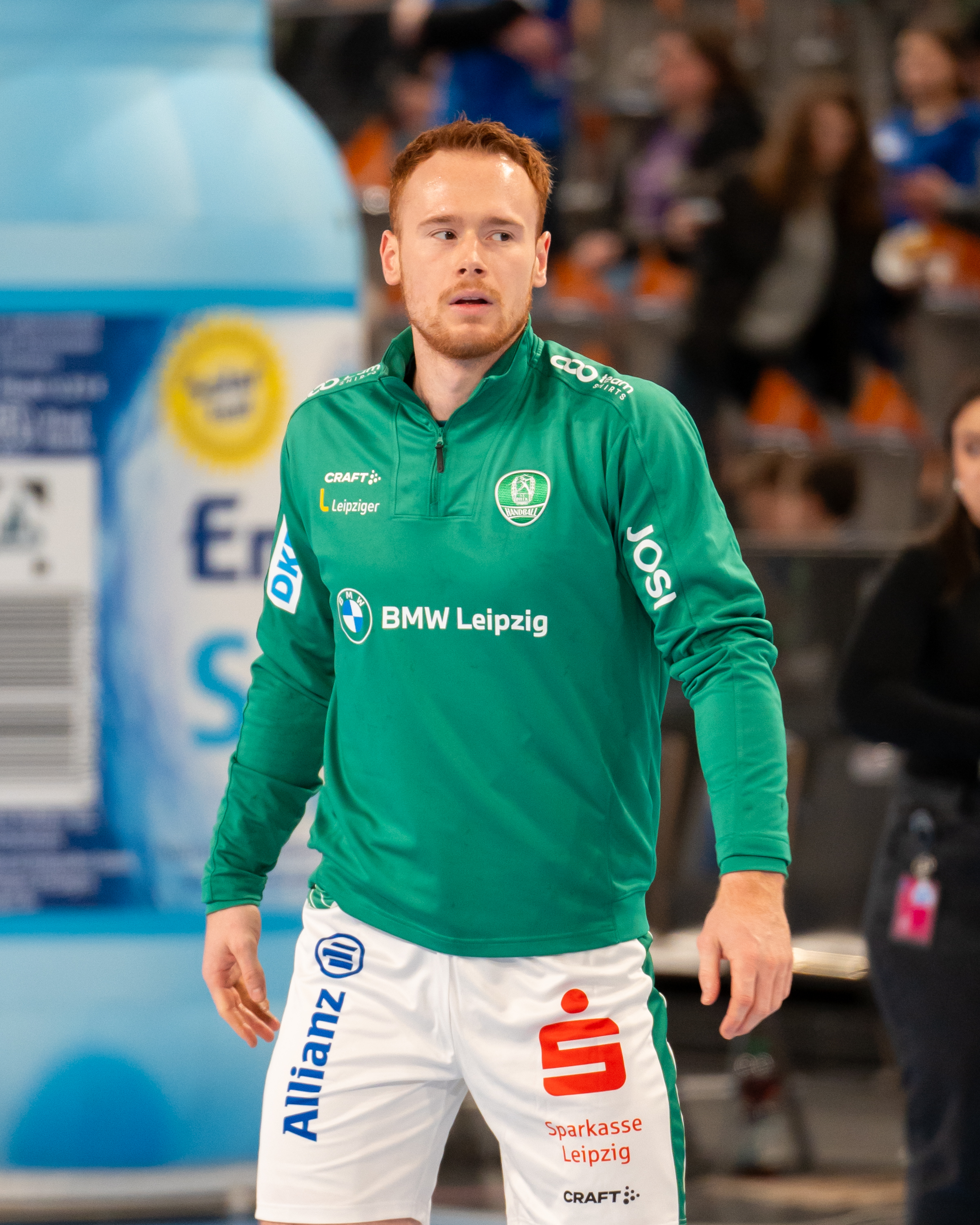

Personal information
- Nationality: Czech
- Born: 12 May 2000 (age 26) Plzeň, Czech Republic
- Height: 1.88 m (6 ft 2 in)

Sport
- Sport: Handball
- Position: Right back
- Current club: Wisła Płock
- Number: 7

Senior clubs
- Years: Team
- –2018: Talent Plzeň
- 2018–2019: MT Melsungen
- 2019–2021: HC Kriens-Luzern
- 2021–2022: US Créteil Handball
- 2022–2025: Wisła Płock
- 2025–: SC DHfK Leipzig
National team
Years	Team	Apps	(Gls)
2019–	Czech Republic	32	(71)

Tomáš Piroch (born 12 May 2000) is a Czech handball player for Wisła Płock and the Czech Republic national team.
