= Anadin Suljaković =

Qatari handball player (born 1998)

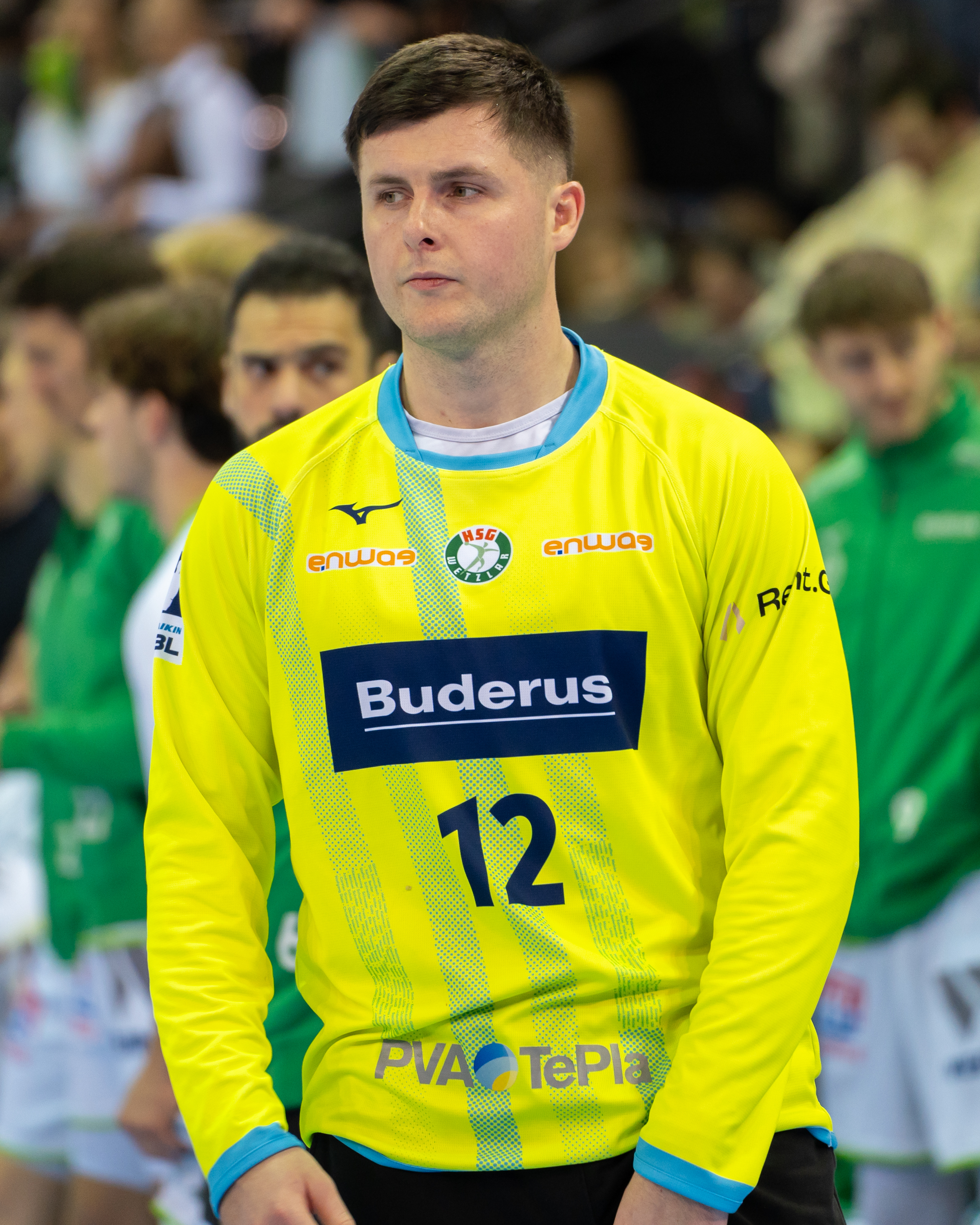

Personal information
- Nationality: Bosnian/Qatari
- Born: 16 June 1998 (age 28) Zenica, Bosnia and Herzegovina
- Height: 1.96 m (6 ft 5 in)

Sport
- Sport: Handball
- Position: Goalkeeper
- Current club: HSG Wetzlar
- Number: 12

Senior clubs
- Years: Team
- –: RK Maglaj
- –: Al Sadd
- –: Selfoss
- –2019: Al Ahli
- 2019–2026: HSG Wetzlar
- 2019–2020: HSG Wetzlar U23
- 2020–2021: → EHV Aue (loan)
- 2026–: SC DHfK Leipzig
National team
Years	Team	Apps	(Gls)
–	Qatar	18	(1)
Medal record
Asian Championship
Gold medal – first place	2024 Bahrain
Silver medal – second place	2026 Kuwait

Anadin Suljaković (born 16 June 1998) is a Bosnian-born Qatari handball player who plays for HSG Wetzlar and the Qatari national team.

He represented Qatar at the 2019 World Men's Handball Championship.
