= Kristian Sæverås =

Norwegian handball player (born 1996)

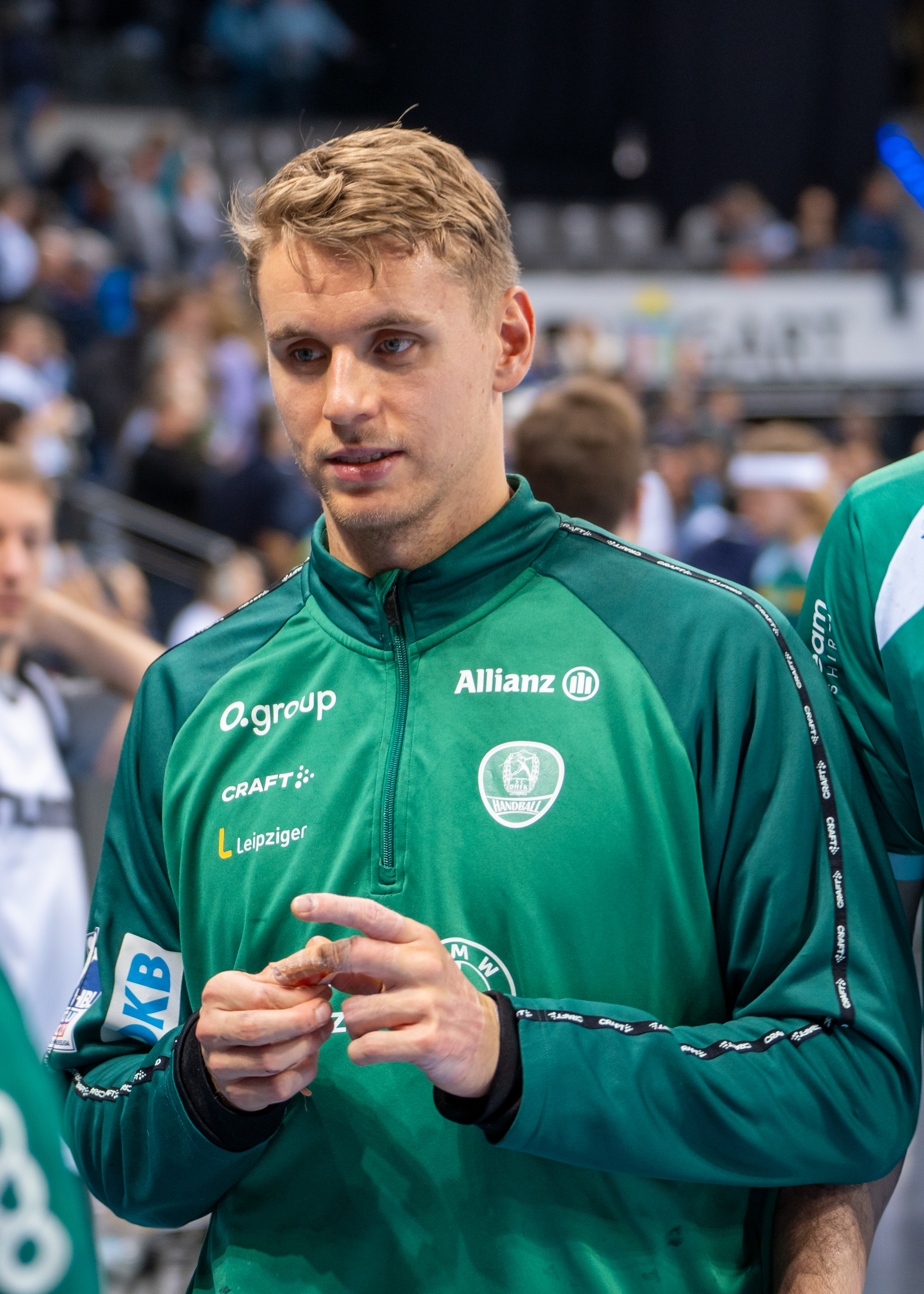
- Sæverås in 2024

Personal information
- Full name: Kristian Skinstad Sæverås
- Nationality: Norwegian
- Born: 22 June 1996 (age 30) Oslo, Norway
- Height: 1.97 m (6 ft 6 in)

Sport
- Sport: Handball
- Position: Goalkeeper
- Current club: SC DHfK Leipzig Handball
- Number: 12

Youth career
- Years: Team
- 2010–2012: Kolbotn IL

Senior clubs
- Years: Team
- 2012–2017: Bækkelagets SK
- 2017–2018: HK Malmö
- 2018–2020: Aalborg Håndbold
- 2020–2025: SC DHfK Leipzig Handball
- 2025–: Frisch Auf Göppingen
National team
Years	Team	Apps	(Gls)
2018–	Norway	94	(3)
Medal record
European Championship
Bronze medal – third place	2020 Sweden/Austria/Norway

Kristian Skinstad Sæverås (born 22 June 1996) is a Norwegian handball player for SC DHfK Leipzig Handball and the Norwegian national team.

== International career ==
Sæverås got his international championship debut at the 2018 European Championship, when he was called up to play the last match in the tournament for Norway against Sweden.

He then participated at the 2020 European Championship, 2021 World Championship, 2020 Summer Olympics, 2022 European Championship, 2023 World Championship, 2024 European Championship and 2024 Summer Olympics. At the 2025 World Championship he was added to the squad when Sander Sagosen got injured, but never entered the actual match squad.

== Achievements ==
- European Championship:
  - Bronze: 2020
