= Domenico Ebner =

Italian handball player (born 1994)

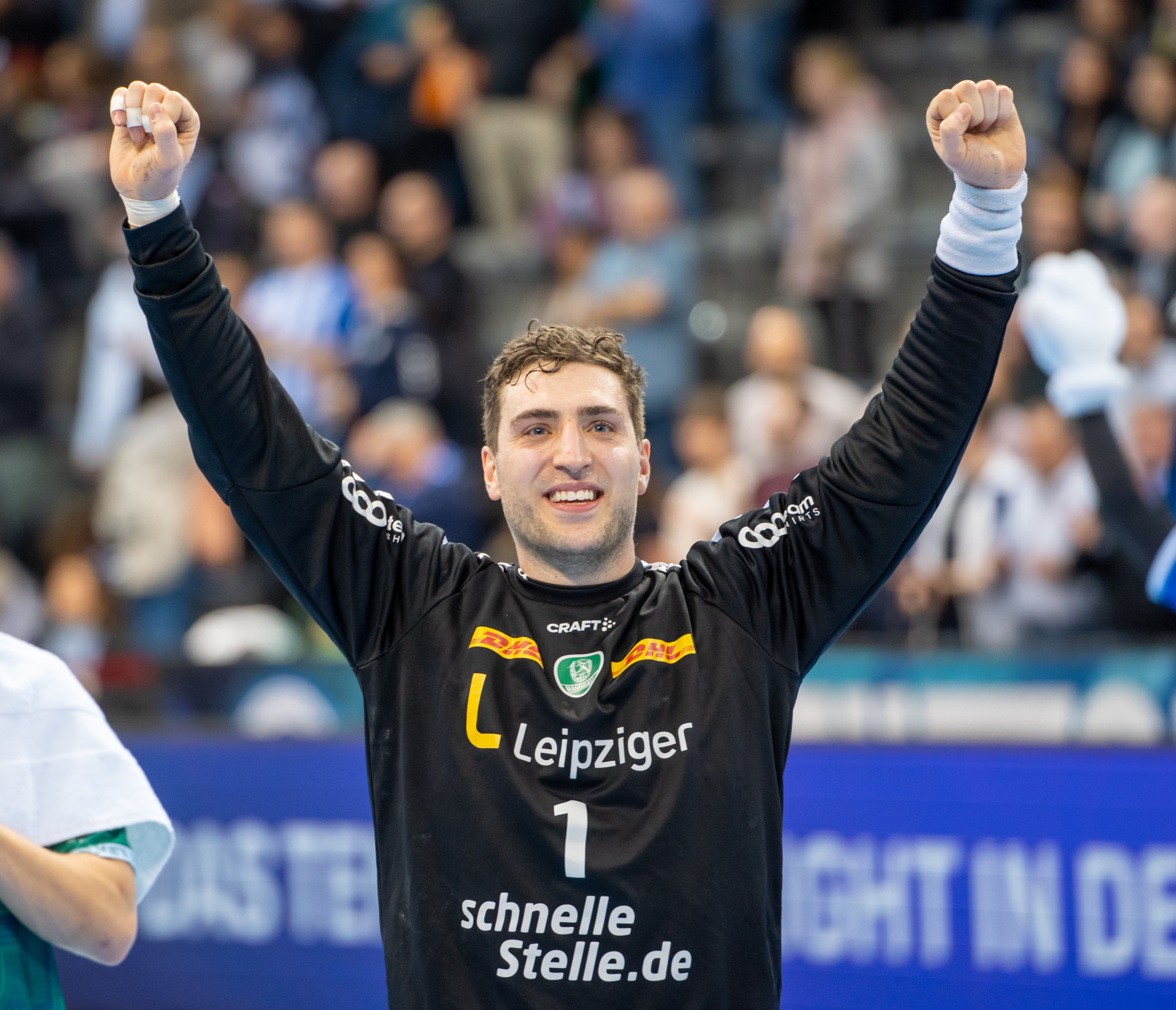
- Domenico Ebner 2024

Personal information
- Nationality: Italian-German
- Born: 26 April 1994 (age 32) Freiburg, Germany
- Height: 1.92 m (6 ft 4 in)

Sport
- Sport: Handball
- Position: Goalkeeper
- Current club: SC DHfK Leipzig
- Number: 1

Youth career
- Years: Team
- 2000-2006: TSV March
- 2006-2010: SG Waldkirch/Denzlingen
- 2010-2011: TuS Schutterwald

Senior clubs
- Years: Team
- 2010-2011: TuS Schutterwald
- 2011-2016: SG Köndringen/Teningen
- 2016-2019: SG BBM Bietigheim
- 2016-2023: TSV Hannover-Burgdorf
- 2023-: SC DHfK Leipzig
National team
| Years | Team | Apps | (Gls) |
| 2017- | Italy | 53 | (9) |
- Updated on 6 January 2025

Domenico Ebner (born 26 April 1994) is a German Italian handball player who plays as a goalkeeper for SC DHfK Leipzig and the Italian national team. Born in Freiburg, Germany, Ebner is of Italian heritage through his mother, and on request from the Italian national team, he applied for Italian as a second nationality, and could thus play for the Italian national team.
