= SC DHfK Leipzig Handball =

German handball club

- Full name: Sportclub Deutsche Hochschule für Körperkultur Leipzig
- Founded: September 20, 1954; 72 years ago
- Arena: Arena Leipzig
- Capacity: 8,000
- President: Bernd Merbitz
- Head coach: André Haber
- League: Handball-Bundesliga
- 2025–26: 18th of 18 (relegated)
- Club colours
| Home | Away |

SC DHfK Leipzig Handball is a German handball team from Leipzig, Germany, that plays in the Handball-Bundesliga. It was one of the strongest GDR clubs in late 1950s and 1960s.

Location of SC DHfK Leipzig Handball

== History ==
The SC DHfK Leipzig was founded in 1954 as a sports club of the Deutsche Hochschule für Körperkultur (German University for Physical Culture). During the time in the GDR, the club's handball section won six national championships (1959, 1960, 1961, 1962, 1965, 1966) and won the GDR Cup twice. In addition, it won the EHF Champions League in the 1965/1966 season and defeated Budapest Honvéd in the final on 22 April 1966 (16:14). In 1975, the authorities decided to dissolve the handball section and transfer all the players to another club in the city, SC Leipzig. On 30 June 1993, the handball department was re-established at SC DHfK. In June 1995, due to financial problems, the handball division was disbanded again. Finally, in 2007, the DHfK handball section was revived for the third time at the lowest level of German handball. It returned to the Handball-Bundesliga in the 2015–2016 season.

== Crest, colours, supporters ==
=== Kit manufacturers ===
| Period | Kit manufacturer |
|---|---|
| –2017 | (Denmark) Hummel |
| 2017–2020 | (Germany) Puma |
| 2020–present | (Sweden) Craft |

=== Kits ===
HOME
| 2014–16 | 2016–17 | 2018–20 | Craft; 2020–21 | Craft; 2021–22 |

AWAY
| 2015–16 | 2016–17 | 2017–18 | 2018–19 | 2019–20 | Craft; 2020–21 | Craft; 2021–22 |

THIRD
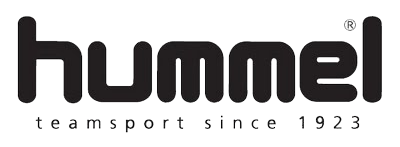
2016–17

== Sports hall information ==
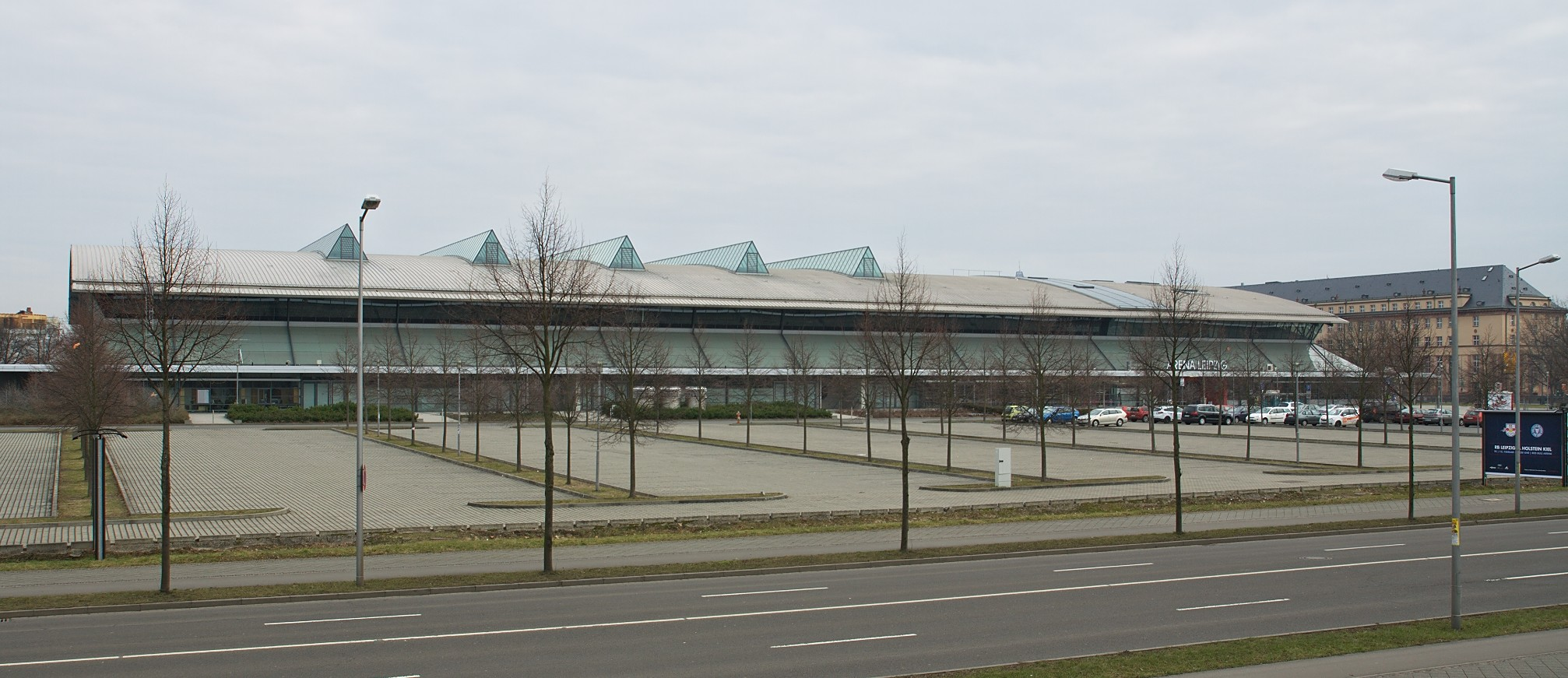
Home hall: Arena Leipzig

- Name: – Arena Leipzig
- City: – Leipzig
- Capacity: – 8000
- Address: – Am Sportforum 2 04105 Leipzig, Germany

== Accomplishments ==
- EHF Champions League:
  - Gold: 1966
- GDR Championship (Oberliga):
  - Gold: 1959, 1960, 1961, 1962, 1965, 1966, 1976^{a}, 1979^{a}
  - Silver: 1969^{a}
- GDR Cup (FDGB-Pokal):
  - Gold: 1971, 1972, 1982^{a}
- 2. Handball-Bundesliga:
  - Gold: 2015

== Team ==
=== Current squad ===
Squad for the 2024–25 season

SC DHfK Leipzig Handball

Goalkeepers

- 1 (Italy) Domenico Ebner
- 12 (Norway) Kristian Sæverås

Left wingers

- 11 (Germany) Lukas Binder
- (Germany) Nils Greilich

Right wingers

- 8 (Germany) Lukas Krzikalla

Line players

- 24 (Germany) Moritz Preuss
- (Serbia) Luka Rogan

Left backs

- 13 (Czech Republic) Matěj Klíma
- 14 (Croatia) Marko Mamić
- (Germany) Friedrich Schmitt

Centre Backs

- 4 (Iceland) Andri Rúnarsson
- 5 (Germany) Simon Ernst
- 7 (Germany) Luca Witzke

Right backs

- 32 (Germany) Franz Semper
- 73 (Iceland) Viggó Kristjánsson

=== Technical staff ===
- Head coach: (Germany) André Haber
- Assistant coach: (Slovakia) Miloš Putera
- Athletic Trainer: (Germany) Hagen Pietrek
- Physiotherapist: (Germany) Leon Brettschneider
- Club doctor: (Germany) Dr. Pierre Hepp

=== Transfers ===
Transfers for the 2026–27 season

Joining

- (Qatar) (Bosnia and Herzegovina) Anadin Suljaković (GK) from (Germany) HSG Wetzlar
- (Germany) Finn Schroven (RB) from (Germany) TSV Bayer Dormagen
- (Germany) Tim Maximilian Hertzfeld (LP) from (Germany) Dessau-Roßlauer HV
- (Germany) Fritz-Leon Haake (CB) from (Germany) Dessau-Roßlauer HV
- (Germany) Anton Voss (RW) back from loan at (Germany) HC Elbflorenz Dresden

Leaving

- (Croatia) Marko Mamić (LB) to (Croatia) RK Zagreb
- (Czech Republic) Tomáš Piroch (RB) to (Germany) HSG Wetzlar
- (Italy) Domenico Ebner (GK) to (Germany) TBV Lemgo
- (Sweden) Adam Lönn (LB) to (Sweden) Lugi HF
- (Sweden) William Bogojevic (LB) to (Portugal) S.L. Benfica
- (Egypt) Ahmed Khairy (CB) to (Egypt) Al Ahly
- (Germany) Simon Ernst (CB)
- (Germany) Lucas Krzikalla (RW) to (Germany) Münchner Panther

=== Transfer History ===
Transfers for the 2025–26 season

Joining

- (Czech Republic) Tomáš Mrkva (GK) from (Germany) THW Kiel
- (Czech Republic) Tomáš Piroch (RB) from (Poland) Wisła Płock
- (Egypt) Ahmed Khairy (CB) from (Egypt) Al Ahly
- (Sweden) Adam Lönn (LB) from (France) Pays d'Aix Université Club
- (Iceland) Blær Hinriksson (CB) from (Iceland) UMF Afturelding
- (Slovenia) Dean Bombač (CB) from (Hungary) Győri ETO-UNI FKC

Leaving

- (Iceland) Andri Már Rúnarsson (CB) to (Germany) HC Erlangen
- (Norway) Kristian Sæverås (GK) to (Germany) Frisch Auf Göppingen
- (Germany) Luca Witzke (CB) to (Germany) SG Flensburg-Handewitt
- (Germany) Stephan Seitz (RB) to (Germany) ThSV Eisenach
- (Germany) Anton Voss (RW) on loan at (Germany) HC Elbflorenz Dresden

== Previous squads ==
2012–2013 Team
| Shirt No | Nationality | Player | Birth Date | Position |
|---|---|---|---|---|
| 1 | Czech Republic | Michael Galia | 2 October 1972 (age 54) | Goalkeeper |
| 2 | Germany | Martin Müller | 9 May 1990 (age 36) | Left Back |
| 3 | Germany | Ole Dietzmann | 20 March 1989 (age 37) | Right Back |
| 4 | Germany | Max Emanuel | 26 August 1994 (age 32) | Right Back |
| 6 | Germany | Ulrich Streitenberger | 6 April 1982 (age 44) | Left Winger |
| 8 | Germany | Lucas Krzikalla | 14 January 1994 (age 32) | Right Winger |
| 9 | Germany | Steve Baumgärtel | 25 February 1984 (age 42) | Right Back |
| 10 | Germany | Thomas Oehlrich | 5 August 1984 (age 42) | Line Player |
| 11 | Germany | Lukas Binder | 30 June 1992 (age 34) | Left Winger |
| 17 | Germany | René Boese | 28 February 1984 (age 42) | Right Winger |
| 18 | Germany | Eric Jacob | 5 April 1987 (age 39) | Left Back |
| 21 | Germany | Till Riehn | 1 July 1986 (age 40) | Central Back |
| 22 | Hungary | Gabor Pulay | 15 June 1970 (age 56) | Goalkeeper |
| 24 | Germany | Oliver Krechel | 24 November 1990 (age 35) | Goalkeeper |
| 29 | Czech Republic | Pavel Prokopec | 10 January 1980 (age 46) | Left Back |
| 30 | Romania | Cristian Telehuz | 29 September 1979 (age 47) | Line Player |
| 43 | Germany | Alexander Feld | 15 June 1993 (age 33) | Central Back |
| 55 | Germany | Rico Göde | 13 April 1982 (age 44) | Line Player |

== EHF ranking ==
As of 22 October 2026

| Rank | Team | Points |
|---|---|---|
| 184 | (Austria) SG Handball West Wien | 13 |
| 185 | (Germany) TVB Stuttgart | 13 |
| 186 | (Slovenia) RK Slovenj Gradec | 13 |
| 187 | (Germany) SC DHfK Leipzig Handball | 13 |
| 189 | (Croatia) RK Spačva Vinkovci | 13 |
| 190 | (Spain) Rebi Balonmano Cuenca | 13 |
| 191 | (Turkey) Depsaş Enerji SK | 13 |

== Former club members ==
=== Notable former players ===
- (Germany) Joel Birlehm (2019–2022)
- (Germany) Simon Ernst (2021–)
- (Germany) Rico Göde (2012–2014)
- (Germany) Benjamin Herth (2016)
- (Germany) Klaus Franke (1959–1971)
- (Germany) Maximilian Janke (2015–2021)
- (Germany) Yves Kunkel (2017–2018)
- (Germany) Philipp Müller (2019–2021)
- (Germany) Niclas Pieczkowski (2016–2021)
- (Germany) (Poland) Andreas Rojewski (2016–2019)
- (Germany) Bastian Roscheck (2013–2021)
- (Germany) Franz Semper (2013–2020)
- (Germany) Christoph Steinert (2015–2017)
- (Germany) Hans-Joachim Ursinus (1963–1974)
- (Germany) Jens Vortmann (2016–2020)
- (Germany) Luca Witzke (2019–)
- (Germany) Philipp Weber (2013–2016, 2017–2021)
- (Argentina) Juan Pablo Fernández (2009–2010)
- (Austria) Raul Santos (2018–2020)
- (Croatia) Šime Ivić (2021–)
- (Croatia) Lovro Jotić (2021–)
- (Croatia) Marko Mamić (2019–)
- (Croatia) Marino Marić (2022–)
- (Czech Republic) Pavel Prokopec (2012–2014)
- (Denmark) René Villadsen (2018–2019)
- (Denmark) Patrick Wiesmach (2018–)
- (Egypt) Mohamed El-Tayar (2022–)
- (France) Joël Abati (2011)
- (Iceland) Viggó Kristjánsson (2019, 2022–)
- (Latvia) Aivis Jurdžs (2015–2019)
- (Norway) Kristian Sæverås (2020–2025)
- (Norway) Henrik Ruud Tovås (2013–2015)
- (Poland) Maciej Gębala (2018–)
- (Russia) Igor Lyovshin (2013)
- (Serbia) Goran Stojanović (2011)
- (Switzerland) Alen Milosevic (2013–2022)
- (Slovakia) Miloš Putera (2015–2019)
- (Sweden) Tobias Rivesjö (2016–2018)
- (Sweden) Oskar Sunnefeldt (2021–)

=== Former coaches ===
| Seasons | Coach | Country |
|---|---|---|
| 2010–2013 | Uwe Jungandreas | (Germany) |
| 2013 | Michael Biegler | (Germany) |
| 2013 | André Haber | (Germany) |
| 2013–2017 | Christian Prokop | (Germany) |
| 2017 | André Haber | (Germany) |
| 2018 | Michael Biegler | (Germany) |
| 2018– | André Haber | (Germany) |

== Notes ==
a. SC Leipzig
