= Franz Semper =

German handball player (born 1997)

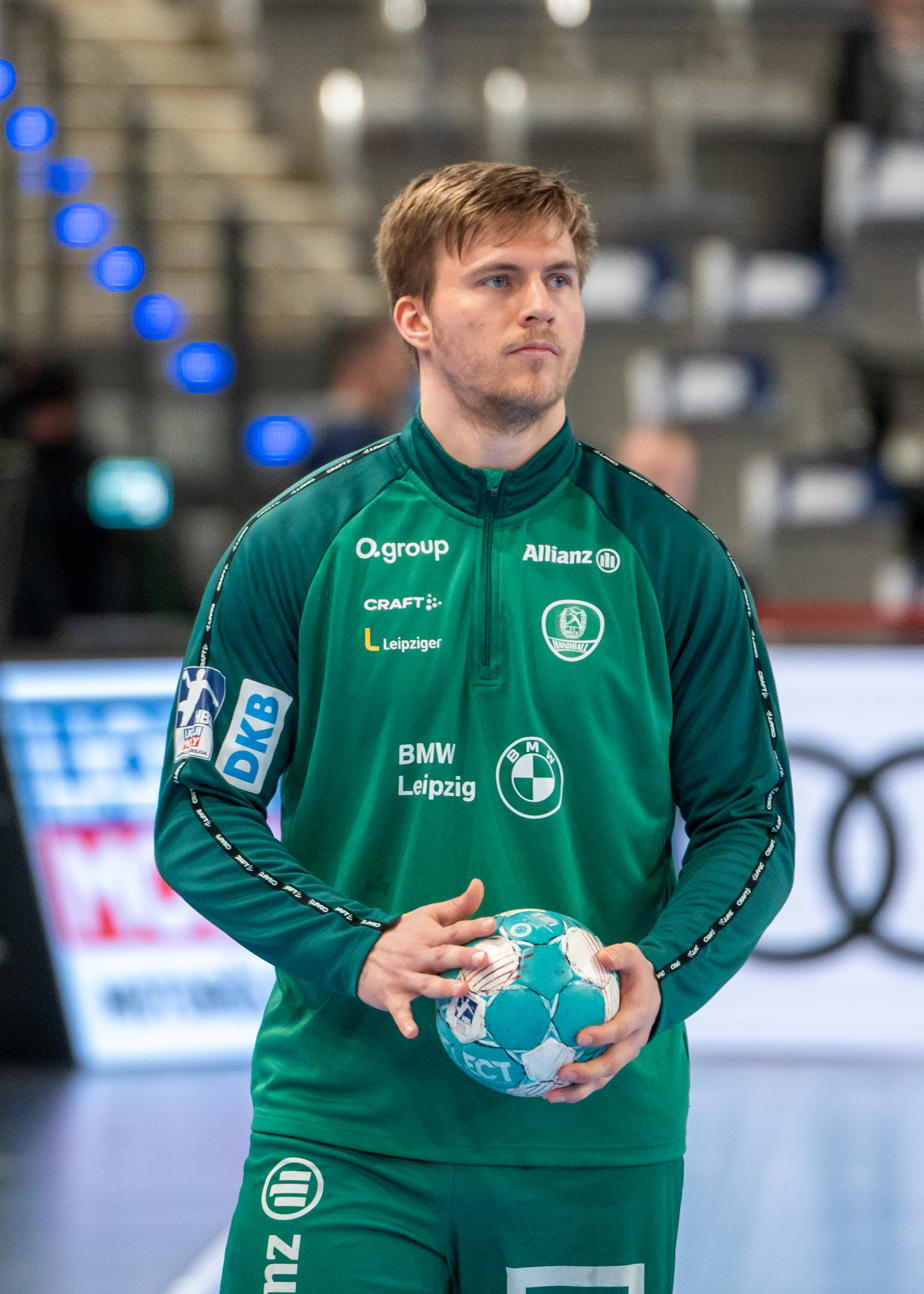

Personal information
- Nationality: German
- Born: 5 July 1997 (age 29) Borna, Germany
- Height: 1.90 m (6 ft 3 in)

Sport
- Sport: Handball
- Position: Right back
- Current club: SG Flensburg-Handewitt
- Number: 32

Youth career
- Years: Team
- 2013–2016: SC DHfK Leipzig

Senior clubs
- Years: Team
- 2016–2020: SC DHfK Leipzig
- 2020–2023: SG Flensburg-Handewitt
- 2023–: SC DHfK Leipzig
National team
Years	Team	Apps	(Gls)
2018–	Germany	42	(78)
Medal record
European Championship
Silver medal – second place	2026 Denmark/Norway/Sweden
- Updated on 8 November 2026

Franz Semper (born 5 July 1997) is a German handball player for SC DHfK Leipzig and the German national team.

He participated at the 2019 World Men's Handball Championship. At the 2026 European Men's Handball Championship he won silver medals, losing to Denmark in the final.
