= Luca Witzke =

German handball player (born 1999)

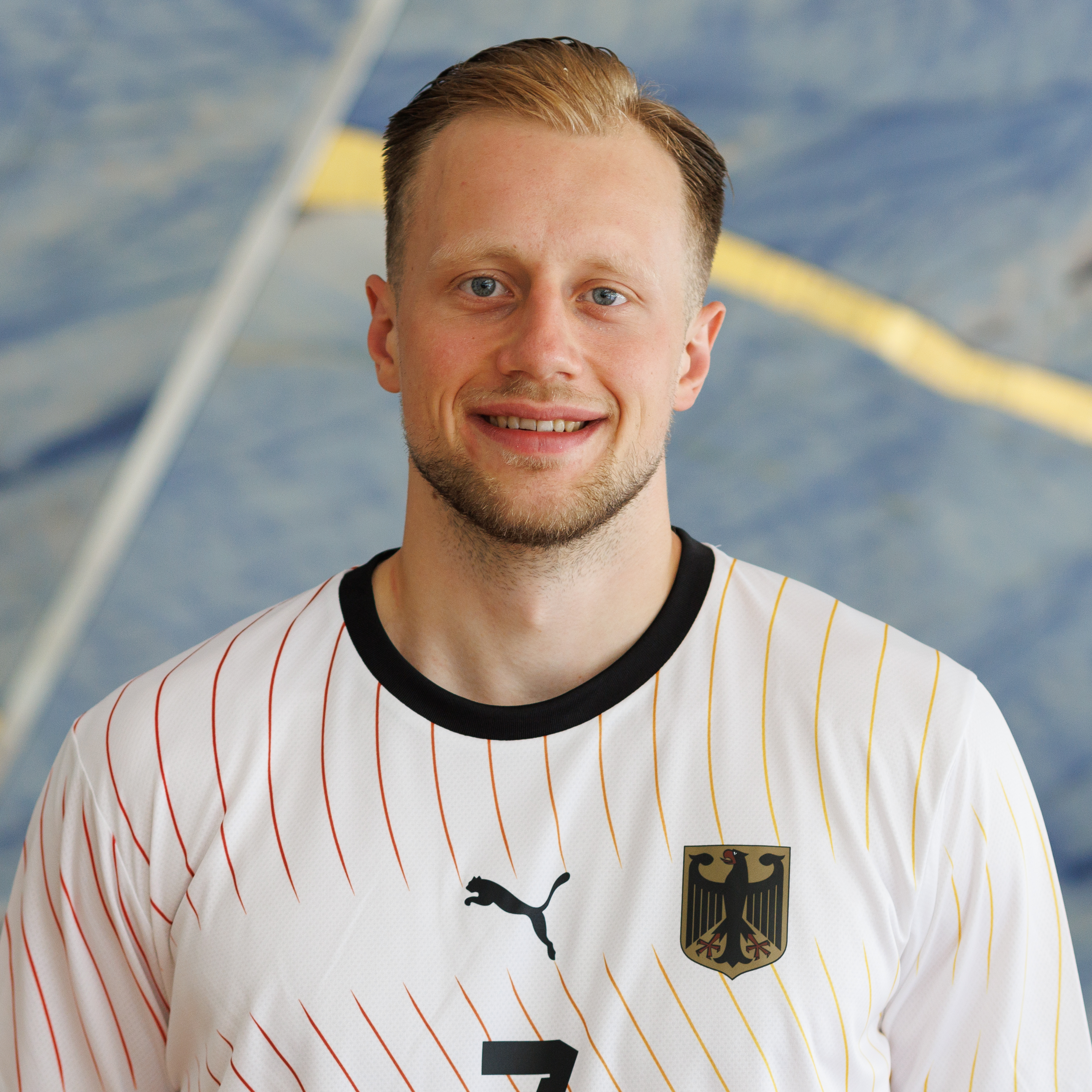
- Witzke in 2024

Personal information
- Nationality: German
- Born: 3 April 1999 (age 27) Kempen, Germany
- Height: 1.91 m (6 ft 3 in)

Sport
- Sport: Handball
- Position: Centre back
- Current club: SC DHfK Leipzig
- Number: 7

Youth career
- Years: Team
- 2004–2011: Hülser SV
- 2011–2014: TV Aldekerk
- 2014–2016: ART Düsseldorf
- 2016–2018: TUSEM Essen

Senior clubs
- Years: Team
- 2018–2019: TUSEM Essen
- 2019–2025: SC DHfK Leipzig
- 2025–: SG Flensburg-Handewitt
National team
Years	Team	Apps	(Gls)
2021–	Germany	51	(106)
Medal record
Olympic Games
Silver medal – second place	2024 Paris	Team
- Updated on 8 November 2026

Luca Witzke (born 3 April 1999) is a German handball player who plays for SG Flensburg Handewitt and the German national team.

== Club career ==
Witzke joined TUSEM Essen in the A-youth team. In the 2017/18 season he played in the club's second division team. In the 2018/19 season he scored 98 goals for Essen. In the summer of 2019, he moved to SC DHfK Leipzig in the Bundesliga.

== International career ==
Witzke had played 18 junior international matches. With the U20 national team, he won the bronze medal at the European Championships in Celje, Slovenia in the summer of 2018. He missed the 2019 U21 European Championships due to a patellar tendon injury.

In October 2019, Witzke was nominated for a training and international match week for the senior national team. There, he broke his nose, meaning he did not make his first international appearance. He was the youngest player in the 28-man squad for the European Championships in January 2020.

On 5 November 2021, Witzke made his debut for the senior national team in a friendly against Portugal in Luxembourg. At the 2022 European Championship, he played two games before a positive COVID-19 test ended his tournament. At the 2023 World Cup, he reached 5th place with the German national team, and Witzke scored 20 goals.
