= Marko Mamić =

Croatian handball player (born 1994)

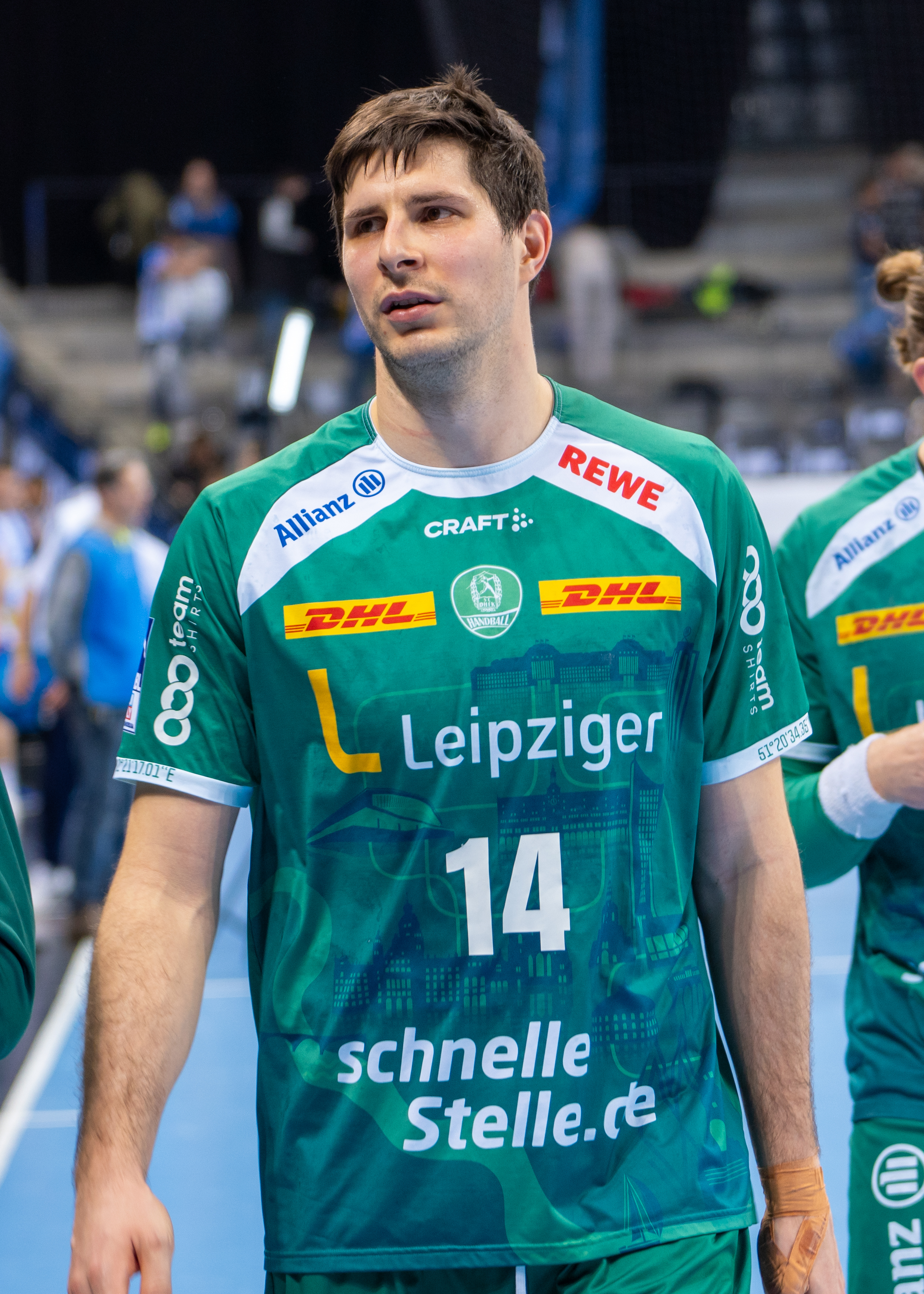

Personal information
- Nationality: Croatian
- Born: 6 March 1994 (age 32) Zagreb, Croatia
- Height: 2.00 m (6 ft 7 in)

Sport
- Sport: Handball
- Position: Left back
- Current club: SC DHfK Leipzig
- Number: 14

Youth career
- Years: Team
- 2007–2012: RK Moslavina

Senior clubs
- Years: Team
- 2012–2015: Kadetten Schaffhausen
- 2015–2017: Dunkerque
- 2017–2019: PGE Vive Kielce
- 2019–2026: SC DHfK Leipzig
- 2026–: RK Zagreb
National team
Years	Team	Apps	(Gls)
2016–	Croatia	113	(123)
Medal record
World Championship
Silver medal – second place	2025 Croatia/Denmark/Norway
European Championship
Silver medal – second place	2020 Sweden/Austria/Norway
Bronze medal – third place	2016 Poland
Bronze medal – third place	2026 Denmark/Norway/Sweden
Youth World Championship
Silver medal – second place	2013 Hungary
- Updated on 2 February 2026

Marko Mamić (born 6 March 1994) is a Croatian handball player for RK Zagreb and the Croatian national team.
