= Tomislav Jagurinovski =

Macedonian handball player

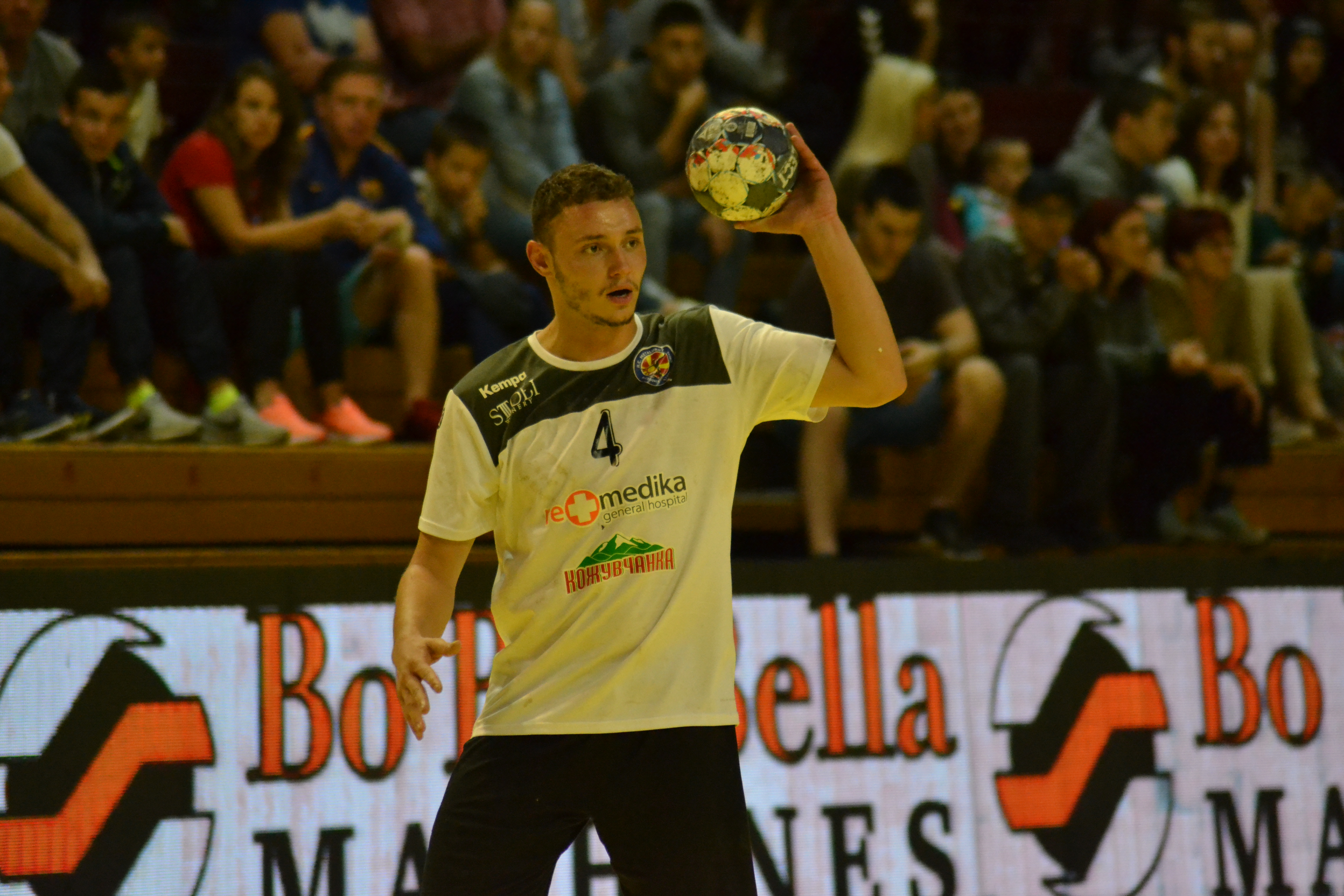

Personal information
- Nationality: Macedonian
- Born: 19 August 1998 (age 28) Skopje, Macedonia
- Height: 1.88 m (6 ft 2 in)

Sport
- Sport: Handball
- Position: Right wing/back
- Current club: GRK Ohrid
- Number: 4

Youth career
- Years: Team
- –: RK Vardar

Senior clubs
- Years: Team
- –2016: RK Vardar II
- 2016–2020: RK Metalurg Skopje
- 2016–2017: RK Metalurg II
- 2017: → Eurofarm Rabotnik
- 2017–2018: → RK Pelister
- 2020–2021: RK Vardar 1961
- 2021–2022: Þór Akureyri
- 2022: RK Tineks Prolet
- 2023–2025: RK Vardar 1961
- 2025–10/2025: Dessau-Roßlauer HV
- 10/2025–: GRK Ohrid
National team
| Years | Team | Apps | (Gls) |
| 2019– | Macedonia | 11 | (16) |

Tomislav Jagurinovski (Macedonian: Томислав Јагуриновски) (born 19 August 1998) is a Macedonian handball player for GRK Ohrid and the Macedonian national team.

He participated at the 2017 Men's Junior World Handball Championship.

== Honors ==
RK Metalurg Skopje

- Macedonian Handball Cup

Winner:2019

RK Vardar

- Macedonian Handball Super League

Winner:2021

- Macedonian Handball Cup

Winner:2021, 2023
