= Viggó Kristjánsson =

Icelandic handball player (born 1993)

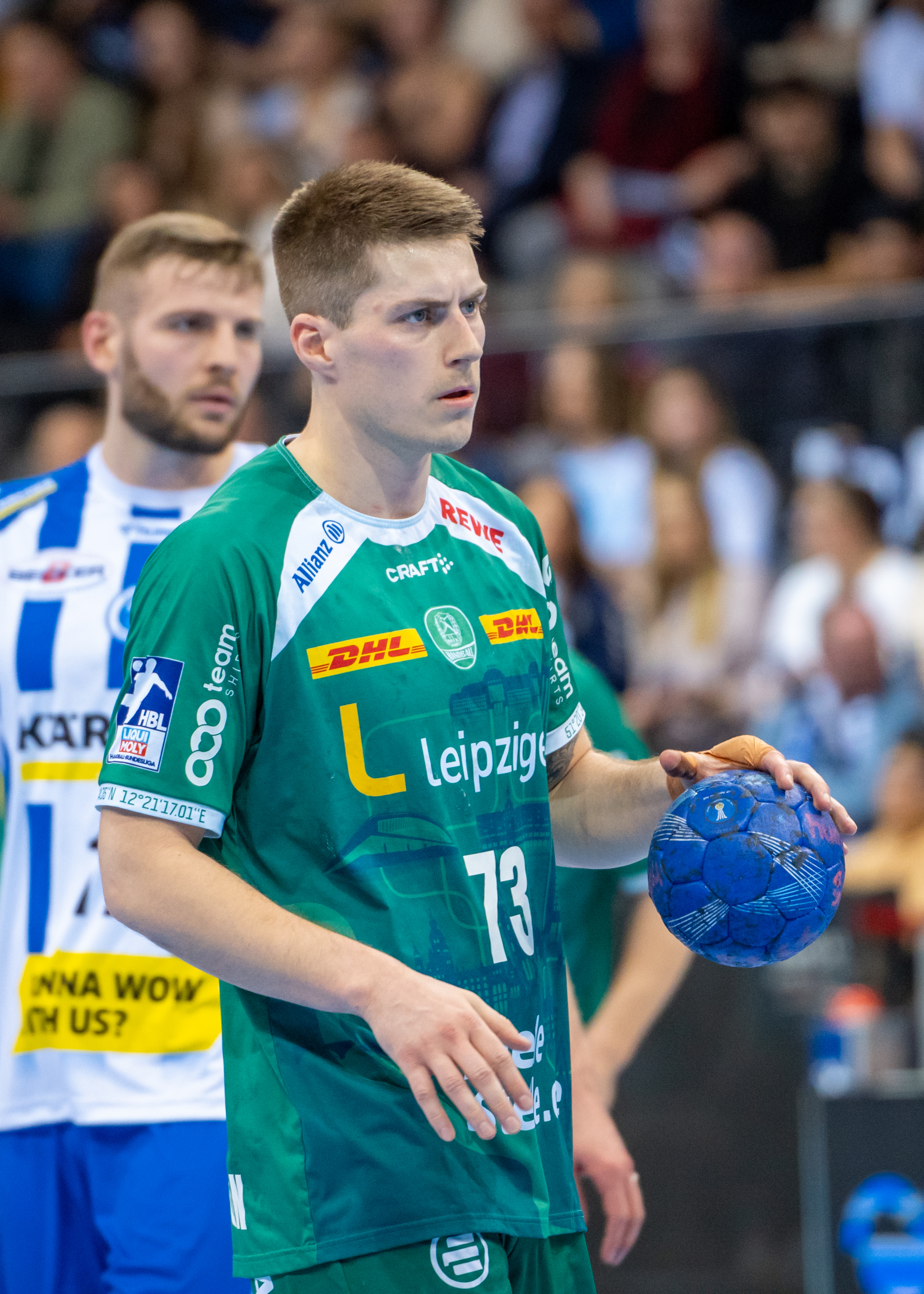

Personal information
- Nationality: Icelandic
- Born: 9 December 1993 (age 32) Reykjavík, Iceland
- Height: 1.90 m (6 ft 3 in)

Sport
- Sport: Handball
- Position: Right back
- Current club: HC Erlangen
- Number: 73

Youth career
- Years: Team
- –2010: Grótta

Senior clubs
- Years: Team
- 2010: Grótta
- 2014–2016: Grótta
- 2016–2017: Randers HH
- 2017–2019: SG Handball West Wien
- 2019: SC DHfK Leipzig
- 2019–2020: HSG Wetzlar
- 2020–: TV Bittenfeld
National team
Years	Team	Apps	(Gls)
2019–	Iceland	26	(68)

Viggó Kristjánsson
Personal information
- Position: Midfielder

Youth career
- –2009: Grótta

Senior career*
Years	Team	Apps	(Gls)
2009–2011	Grótta	31	(2)
2012–2013	Breiðablik	12	(0)
2012	→ ÍR (loan)	15	(1)
2014	Grótta	20	(11)

International career
2009	Iceland U16	3	(0)
2009	Iceland U17	3	(0)
2010	Iceland U18	2	(0)
- * Club domestic league appearances and goals

Viggó Kristjánsson (born 9 December 1993) is an Icelandic handball player for TV Bittenfeld and the Icelandic national team.

He represented Iceland at the 2020 European Men's Handball Championship, 2021 World Men's Handball Championship and 2022 European Men's Handball Championship. At the 2026 European Men's Handball Championship he finished 4th with Iceland, losing to Denmark in the semifinal and Croatia in the third-place playoff.

Having featured in senior handball in 2010, Viggó didn't play handball again until 2014. In the meantime he played football, playing 12 games in the Icelandic top tier, 43 games in the second tier and 23 games in the third tier, also featuring for the youth national teams in 2009–2010.
