= Saran Loiret Handball =

French handball team

Saran Loiret HB
- Full name: Saran Loiret Handball
- Nickname: Les Septors
- Short name: Saran LH
- Founded: 1974; 52 years ago
- Arena: Palais des sports d'Orléans, Orléans
- Capacity: 3,222
- President: Bruno Bordier
- Head coach: Jérémy Roussel
- League: LNH Division 1
- Club colours
Home	Away

Saran Loiret Handball is a French handball team based in Saran, that plays in the LNH Division 1.

Location of Saran Loiret Handball

== History ==
The club was founded in 1974. In 2002, he reached the 3rd division for the first time. In 2015, after several second places, the team was promoted to the second division. In the first season in the second division, they finally won the championship in the last round and were thus promoted to the first division. In its first season in the first division, the club changed its name to Saran Loiret Handball. In order to maintain his position, the team signed the French world champion Igor Anić. The club had the smallest budget in the league at the time and were almost relegated at the end of the season. The following year, the club signed Spanish world champion Chema Rodríguez, who was joined in 2018 by another Spanish world champion, José Manuel Sierra. However, during his second season, the club was relegated to the second division. After promotion to Ligue 1 in 2023, the first team will leave Saran and play their home games at the Palais des sports d'Orléans.

== Crest, colours, supporters ==
=== Naming history ===
Name	Period
Union sportive municipale de Saran handball (USM Saran Handball)	1974–2016
Saran Loiret Handball	2016–present

=== Kit manufacturers ===
Period	Kit manufacturer
2022	(Italy) Kappa
2022–present	(France) Vestiaire du Sport

=== Kits ===
HOME
2020-21	2021-22	Vestiaire du Sport; 2023–24

AWAY
2020-21	2021-22	Vestiaire du Sport; 2023–24

== Sports Hall information ==
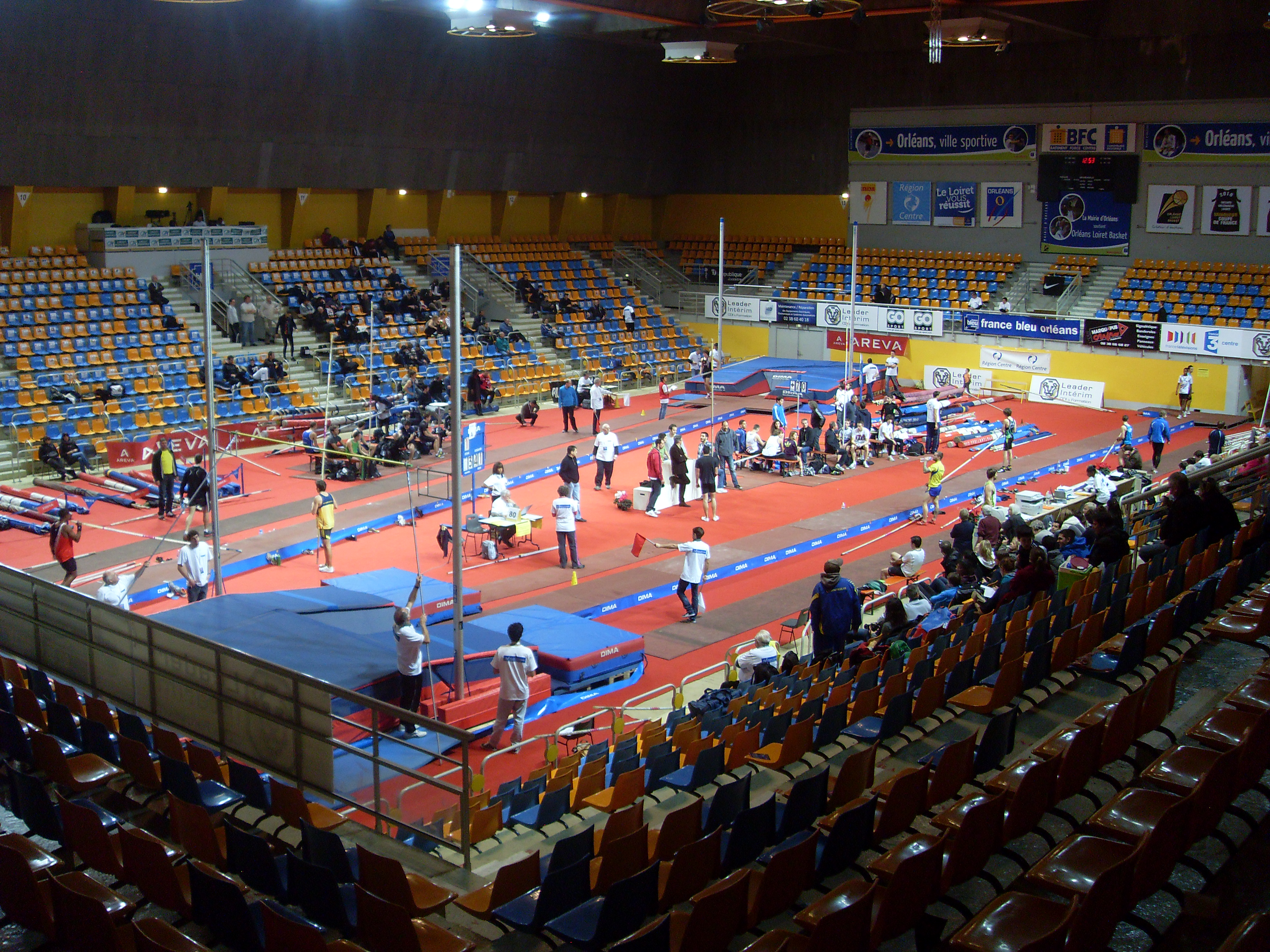
Home hall: Palais des sports d'Orléans

- Name: – Palais des sports d'Orléans
- City: – Orléans
- Capacity: – 3222
- Address: – 14 rue Eugène Vignat, 45000 Orléans, France

== Team ==
=== Current squad ===
Squad for the 2023–24 season

Saran Loiret Handball

Goalkeepers

- 10 (France) (Cameroon) Emmanuel Sokeng
- 12 (France) Yann Genty
- 16 (Croatia) Ivan Panjan

Left Wingers

- 6 (Spain) Jordi Deumal
- 13 (France) Noé Lafougère

Right Wingers

- 35 (France) Enzo Gesland
- 45 (France) Maxence Foucault
- 77 (Montenegro) Luka Radović

Line Players

- 8 (France) Théo Clarac
- 24 (France) Charlélie Gentils
- 29 (France) Yoro Diarra
- 64 (France) Hadrien Ramond (c)

Left Backs

- 18 (France) William Accambray
- 28 (France) Edynio Linère
- 34 (France) (Ivory Coast) Romuald Kollé

Central Backs

- 9 (Spain) Pau Oliveras
- 11 (Belgium) Tom Robyns
- 39 (France) Théo Texier

Right Backs

- 5 (France) Clément Damiani
- 99 (France) Axel Allory

=== Technical staff ===
- Head coach: (France) Jérémy Roussel
- Assistant coach: (France) Guillaume Crépain

=== Transfers ===
Transfers for the 2026–27 season

Joining

- (Serbia) Miloš Orbović (RB) from (Switzerland) HC Kriens-Luzern
- (Portugal) Francisco Tavares (RW) from (France) US Ivry Handball
- (France) Théo Reuillard (RW) from (France) Valence Drôme Handball
- (France) Thomas Loppy (LP) from (France) JS Cherbourg

Leaving

- (France) Lucas Petit (RW) to (France) Limoges Handball

=== Transfer History ===
Transfers for the 2025–26 season

Joining

- (Spain) Eduardo Calle Redondo (LB) from (Spain) Recoletas Atlético Valladolid
- (Brazil) Pedro Pacheco (CB) from (Spain) CD Bidasoa
- (Portugal) Daniel Vieira (RB) from (Iceland) ÍBV
- (France) Noa Narcisse (LB) from (France) Paris Saint-Germain
- (France) Antoine Sol (LP) from (France) Massy Essonne Handball

Leaving

- (Spain) Pau Oliveras (LB) to (Portugal) S.L. Benfica
- (Portugal) Manuel Lima (CB) to (Spain) BM Rebi Cuenca
- (France) Florian Delecroix (RB) to (France) Grand Besançon Doubs Handball
- (France) Antonin Mohamed (LW) to (France) Saint-Raphaël Var Handball
- (France) Théo Clarac (LP) to (France) Limoges Handball

Transfers for the 2023–24 season

Joining

- (Spain) Pau Oliveras (CB) from (France) Frontignan Handball
- (France) William Accambray (LB) from (France) PAUC Handball
- (France) Yann Genty (GK) from (France) Limoges Handball
- (France) (Ivory Coast) Romuald Kollé (LB) from (France) Limoges Handball
- (France) Florian Delecroix (RB) from (France) Cesson Rennes MHB
- (France) Théo Clarac (LP) from (France) Bordeaux Bruges Lormont Handball
- (France) Clément Damiani (RB) from (France) Bordeaux Bruges Lormont Handball

Leaving

- (Israel) Daniel Mosindi (RB) to (France) Cesson Rennes MHB
- (France) Quentin Eymann (RB) to (France) Sélestat Alsace Handball
- (France) Kevin Taufond (CB) to (France) Pontault-Combault Handball
- (France) Antoine Blanc (LB) to (France) Nancy Handball
- (France) Lucas Jametal (RB) to (France) Villeurbanne Handball
- (France) Florian Delecroix (RB) to (France) Cesson Rennes MHB

== Honours ==
- LNH Division 2
  - Winners (2): 2016, 2021
  - Runners-up (1): 2023

== Former club members ==
=== Notable former players ===
- (France) William Accambray (2023–)
- (France) Jean-Jacques Acquevillo (2014–2018)
- (France) Igor Anić (2016-2017)
- (France) (Senegal) Ibrahim Diaw (2016-2018)
- (France) Yann Genty (2023–2024)
- (Algeria) (France) Rabah Soudani (2012–2014)
- (Belgium) Jef Lettens (2015–2016)
- (Belgium) Tom Robyns (2020–)
- (Japan) Adam Yuki Baig (2019-2020)
- (Montenegro) Vasko Ševaljević (2021-2022)
- (Montenegro) Nebojša Simović (2021-2022)
- (Spain) Chema Rodríguez (2017–2020)
- (Spain) José Manuel Sierra (2018–2020)

=== Former coaches ===
Seasons	Coach	Country
2010–2023	Fabien Courtial	(France)
12/2023–2024	Jérémy Roussel	(France)
2024–	Luís Cruz	(Portugal)
