= Žvižej =

Žvižej is a Slovene surname. Notable people with the surname include:

- Luka Žvižej (born 1980), Slovenian handball player
- Miha Žvižej (born 1987), Slovenian handball player, brother of Luka
- Žiga Žvižej, Slovenian Songwriter who represented Slovenia at the Eurovision Song Contest in 2022 with band Last Pizza Slice
