= Oussama Hosni =

Tunisian handball player (born 1992)

Personal information
- Nationality: Tunisian
- Born: 17 September 1992 (age 34) Tunis, Tunisia
- Height: 1.92 m (6 ft 4 in)

Sport
- Sport: Handball
- Position: Right wing/back

Senior clubs
- Years: Team
- –2017: Club Africain
- 2017–2018: US Ivry Handball
- 2018–2019: Pontault-Combault Handball
- 2019–2022: Istres Provence Handball
- 2022: Qadsia SC
- 2022–2023: RK Eurofarm Pelister
- 2023: Al Rayyan
- 2023–2024: Al-Arabi
- 2024–2026: RK Eurofarm Pelister
National team
Years	Team	Apps	(Gls)
–	Tunisia	102	(125)
Medal record
African Championship
Gold medal – first place	2018 Gabon
Silver medal – second place	2020 Tunisia
Bronze medal – third place	2024 Egypt
Mediterranean Games
Silver medal – second place	2018 Tarragona	Team

Oussama Hosni (born 17 September 1992) is a Tunisian handball player for RK Eurofarm Pelister and the Tunisian national team.

He participated on the Tunisia national team at the 2016 Summer Olympics in Rio de Janeiro, in the men's handball tournament.
