= Gonçalo Ribeiro =

Gonçalo Ribeiro may refer to:

- Gonçalo Ribeiro Telles (1922–2020), Portuguese politician and architect
- Gonçalo Ribeiro (handballer) (born 1997), Portuguese handball player
- Gonçalo Ribeiro (footballer) (born 2006), Portuguese footballer
