= Sjöblad =

Sjöblad is a surname. Notable people with the surname include:

- Axel Sjöblad (born 1967), Swedish handball player
- Erik Carlsson Sjöblad (1647–1725), Swedish governor
