= Ruslan Dashko =

Russian handball player

Personal information
- Nationality: Russian
- Born: 13 August 1996 (age 30)
- Height: 1.98 m (6 ft 6 in)

Sport
- Sport: Handball
- Position: Right Back
- Current club: Anaitasuna
- Number: 26

Senior clubs
- Years: Team
- –2019: (Russia) Dynamo-Victor
- 2019–2020: (Spain) Puente Genil
- 2020–2021: (Spain) Anaitasuna
- 2021–: (Spain) Club Balonmano Burgos
National team
Years	Team	Apps	(Gls)
–	Russia	5	(13)

Ruslan Dashko (born 13 August 1996) is a Russian handball player who plays for Angel Ximenez Avia Puente Genil and the Russian national team.

He competed at the 2016 European Men's Handball Championship.
