= Igor Anić =

French handball player (born 1987)

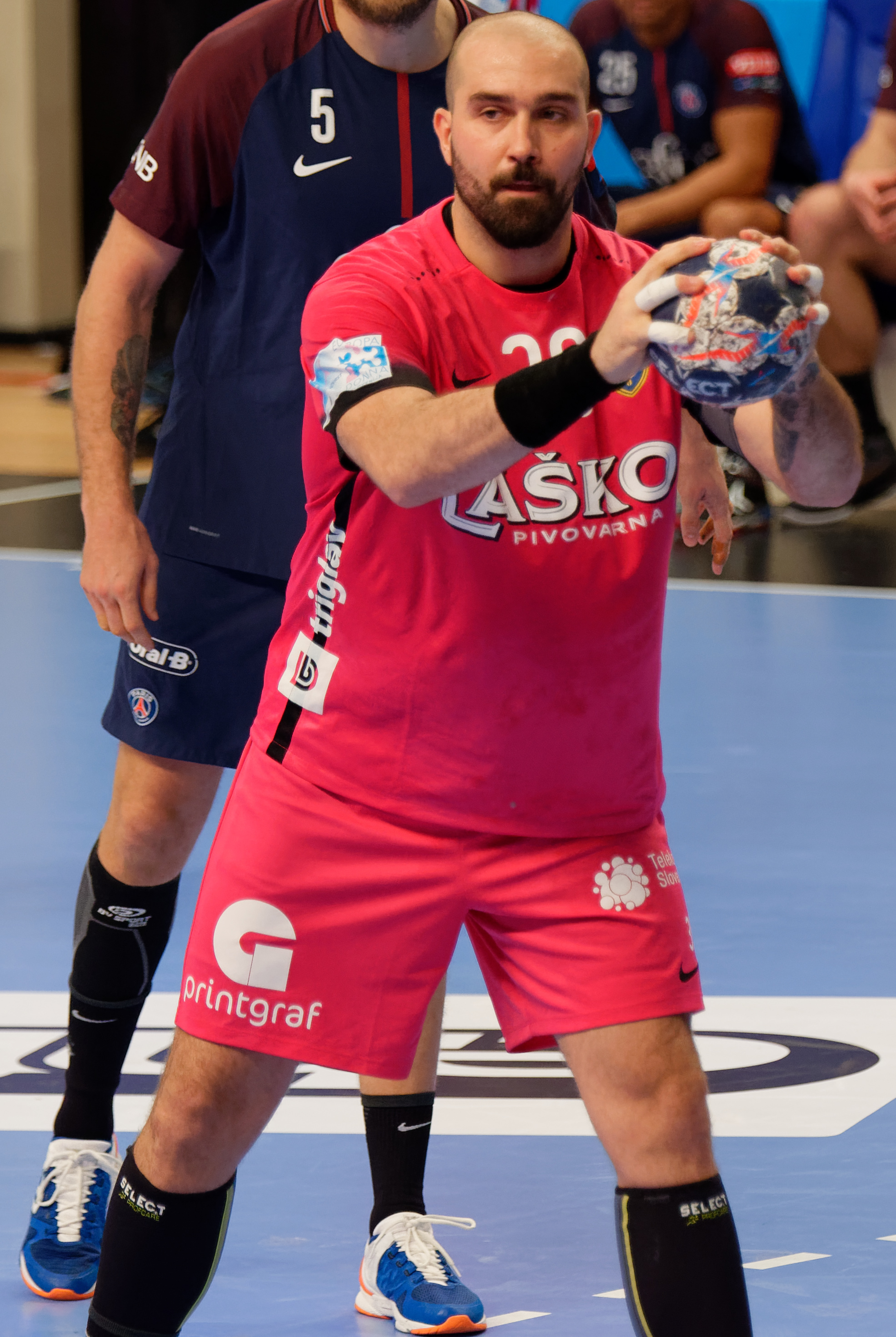
- Igor Anić in 2017

Personal information
- Nationality: French
- Born: 12 June 1987 (age 39) Mostar, SFR Yugoslavia
- Height: 1.96 m (6 ft 5 in)

Sport
- Sport: Handball
- Position: Pivot

Senior clubs
- Years: Team
- 2003–2007: Montpellier HB
- 2007–2010: THW Kiel
- 2010–2012: VfL Gummersbach
- 2012–2014: Cesson Rennes MHB
- 2014–2015: HBC Nantes
- 2015–2016: THW Kiel
- 2016–2017: Saran Loiret Handball
- 2017–2019: RK Celje
- 2019–2021: Cesson Rennes MHB
- 2021–: Daido Steel Phenix
National team
Years	Team	Apps	(Gls)
2009-2015	France	24	(31)
Medal record
Representing France
Men's handball
World Championship
Gold medal – first place	2015 Qatar	Team
European Championship
Gold medal – first place	2014 Denmark	Team
Mediterranean Games
Silver medal – second place	2009 Pescara	Team

Igor Anić (born 12 June 1987) is a French handball player who plays as a pivot.

Born in Mostar, Anić migrated to France and played for Montpellier from 2003 to 2007. With Montpellier, he became French champion in 2006. He then spent five years in Germany, first with THW Kiel from 2007 to 2010 and then VfL Gummersbach from 2010 to 2012. With Kiel he won the 2009–10 EHF Champions League.

Anić returned to France in 2012, playing for Cesson Rennes MHB and then HBC Nantes from 2014 to 2015. He was then re-recruited by THW Kiel to replace their injured pivor Patrick Wiencek. In 2021 he moved to Japan and the Nagoya-based club Daido Steel Phenix.

His first call-up to represent France came in 2009, with him making his debut against Latvia. By 1 January 2015 he had won 24 caps. His main honours with the national team were the gold medals at the 2014 European Championship and the 2015 World Championship.
