= Arena du Pays d'Aix =

Arena in Aix-en-Provence, France

- Aréna du Pays d'Aix
- Interactive map of Arena du Pays d'Aix
- Address: France
- Location: Aix-en-Provence, Bouches-du-Rhône, France
- Coordinates: 43.47306°N 5.40389°E
- Owner: Aix-Marseille-Provence Metropolis

Construction
- Opened: October 11, 2017

Tenant
- Pays d'Aix Université Club handball

Arena du Pays d'Aix (French: Aréna du Pays d'Aix) is a multi-purpose hall near the district of Milles in Aix-en-Provence (Bouches-du-Rhône) inaugurated on 11 October 2017.

== History ==
The arena is an original project by the Communauté d'agglomération of Pays d'Aix (CPA) announced in 2008 by Maryse Joissains-Masini. In 2013, the CPA decided to include the construction of a public transport interchange hub public transport interchange hub. The project was entrusted to the local public company Pays d'Aix Territoires in 2014 and the architects were chosen in 2015.

The hall was chosen as the site for the 2017 World Men's Handball Championship, but, as the project could not be implemented in time, the city of Aix-en-Provence withdrew from being among the host cities in March 2015.

On January 1, 2016, the Aix-Marseille-Provence metropolis succeeded the CPA. Work began in 2016 and on August 27th the metropolitan area launched the procedure to choose a manager for the arena.
