= USAM Nîmes Gard =

French handball club

- Full name: Union Sportive des Anciens du Mont Duplan Nîmes Gard
- Short name: USAM Nîmes
- Founded: 1960; 66 years ago
- Arena: Le Parnasse
- Capacity: 4,191
- President: David Tebib
- Head coach: David Degouy
- League: LNH Division 1
- 2024–25: LNH Division 1, 6th of 16
- Club colours
Home	Away

USAM Nîmes is a French handball team based in Nîmes, that plays in the LNH Division 1.

Location of USAM Nîmes Gard

== Crest, colours, supporters ==
=== Naming history ===
Name	Period
Union Sportive des Anciens du Mont Duplan Nîmes Gard	1960–present

=== Kit manufacturers ===
Period	Kit manufacturer
2011	(Germany) Puma
2011–present	(Italy) Kappa

=== Kits ===
HOME
2009-10	2018-19	2020-21	2021-22	2023-24

AWAY
2009-10	2018-19	2020-21	2021-22	2023-24

== Results ==
- LNH Division 1:
  - Winners: (4) 1988, 1990, 1991, 1993
  - Runner-Up: (4) 1986, 1987, 1989, 1994
- Coupe de France:
  - Winners: 1985, 1986, 1994
  - Finalists: 1989, 2018
- EHF Champions League:
  - Semifinalists: 1994

== Team ==
=== Current squad ===
Squad for the 2024–25 season

USAM Nîmes Gard

Goalkeepers

- 1 (France) Dylan Soyez
- 12 (France) Wesley Pardin

Right Wingers

- 3 (France) Rémi Peyre
- 20 (France) Damien Gibernon
- 91 (Egypt) Mohammad Sanad

Left Wingers

- 6 (France) Julien Rebichon (c)
- 13 (France) Guéric Vincent

Line players

- 2 (France) Tom Poyet
- 17 (France) Hugo Kamtchop-Baril
- 41 (Poland) Sebastian Kaczor

Left Backs

- 8 (France) Yoann Gibelin
- 14 (Brazil) José Luciano Costa da Silva
- 27 (France) Jean-Jacques Acquevillo

Central Backs

- 5 (France) Lou Derisbourg
- 10 (Sweden) Jesper Konradsson
- 18 (France) Boïba Sissoko (injured)

Right Backs

- 24 (France) Luc Tobie
- 48 (Egypt) Mohab Abdelhak

=== Transfers ===
Transfers for the 2026–27 season

Joining

- (Egypt) Mohammad Sanad (RW) from (France) Istres Provence Handball
- (Switzerland) Michael Kusio (RB) from (Switzerland) BSV Bern
- (Belarus) Yahor Stasiuk (GK) from (Slovenia) RK Radovljica
- (Denmark) Toke Schröder (LB) from (France) US Ivry Handball

Leaving

- (Sweden) Gustaf Wedberg (RW) to (Sweden) Tyresö HF
- (France) Wesley Pardin (GK) to (France) Tremblay Handball
- (France) Reyhan Zuzo (CB) to (France) Tremblay Handball

=== Transfer History ===
Transfers for the 2025–26 season

Joining

- (Hungary) Máté Ónodi-Jánoskúti (RB) from (Hungary) Ferencvárosi TC
- (Sweden) Gustaf Wedberg (RW) from (Sweden) IK Sävehof
- (Bosnia and Herzegovina) Harun Hodžić (GK) from (France) Chambéry SMBH
- (France) Arthur Anquetil (LW) from (France) Chambéry SMBH
- (France) Jean-Loup Faustin (CB) from (France) US Dunkerque HB
- (Serbia) Aleksandar Antić (RW) back from loan at (France) Grand Besançon Doubs Handball
- (France) Reyhan Zuzo (CB) back from loan at (France) Caen Handball

Leaving

- (Egypt) Mohammad Sanad (RW) to (France) Istres Provence Handball
- (Sweden) Jesper Konradsson (CB) to (Denmark) Sønderjyske Handbold
- (France) Tom Poyet (LP) to (Sweden) IK Sävehof
- (France) Boïba Sissoko (LW) to (France) US Créteil Handball
- (Brazil) José Luciano Costa da Silva (LB) on loan at (Portugal) Madeira Andebol SAD
- (Egypt) Mohab Abdelhak (RB) to (Germany) THW Kiel

== Former club members ==
=== Notable former players ===
- (France) Jean-Jacques Acquevillo (2019–)
- (France) Cédric Burdet (2009-2010)
- (France) Rémi Desbonnet (2013–2022)
- (France) Philippe Debureau (1994-1996)
- (France) Yohan Delattre (1993-1994)
- (France) Gilles Derot (1983–1994)
- (France) Grégoire Detrez (2001–2008)
- (France) Benjamin Gallego (2010–)
- (France) Dylan Garain (2018–2019)
- (France) Philippe Gardent (1990–1992)
- (France) Christian Gaudin (1987–1994)
- (France) (Socialist Federal Republic of Yugoslavia) Andrej Golić (1991-1992)
- (France) Michaël Guigou (2019–2022)
- (France) Franck Junillon (2010-2012)
- (France) Christophe Kempé (1995–1996)
- (France) Guéric Kervadec (1993–1994)
- (France) Denis Lathoud (1992-1994)
- (France) Olivier Marroux (2014–2017)
- (France) Bruno Martini (2005-2007)
- (France) Olivier Maurelli (1998–2000)
- (France) Franck Maurice (1999–2002)
- (France) Philippe Médard (1989-1992)
- (France) Quentin Minel (2020–)
- (France) O'Brian Nyateu (2017–)
- (France) Alain Portes (1982-1994)
- (France) Elohim Prandi (2017-2020)
- (France) Julien Rebichon (2005–)
- (France) Guillaume Saurina (2006–2010, 2011-2016)
- (France) Stéphane Stoecklin (1990–1994)
- (France) Luc Tobie (2016–)
- (France) Frédéric Volle (1980–1992)
- (Algeria) Malik Boubaiou (2006–2013)
- (Algeria) (France) Micke Brasseleur (2018–2020)
- (Algeria) Hichem Kaabeche (2017–2018, 2019-2020)
- (Algeria) Abdelkader Rahim (2013–2015)
- (Croatia) Zlatko Saračević (1991-1994)
- (Croatia) Mirza Šarić (2005-2006)
- (Croatia) Irfan Smajlagić (1993-1994)
- (Egypt) Ahmed Hesham (2020-)
- (Egypt) Mohammad Sanad (2017-)
- (Spain) Garcia Alberto Aguirrezabalaga (2014-2017)
- (Hungary) Attila Borsos (1991-1992)
- (Iceland) Snorri Guðjónsson (2015-2017)
- (Iceland) Ásgeir Örn Hallgrímsson (2014-2018)
- (Iceland) Ragnar Þór Óskarsson (2007-2008)
- (Morocco) Yassine Idrissi (2000-2008, 2011-2016)
- (Norway) Henrik Jakobsen (2021-)
- (Romania) Sorin Toacsen (1995-1996, 2000-2003)
- (Slovenia) Vid Kavtičnik (2020-2021)
- (Slovenia) Aljoša Rezar (2016-2017)
- (Serbia) Stevan Sretenović (2016-2017)
- (Slovakia) Teodor Paul (2017-2022)
- (Tunisia) Heykel Megannem (2005-2007)

=== Former coaches ===
Seasons	Coach	Country
1996–1998	Gilles Baron	(France)
1998–2000	Boro Golić	(Bosnia and Herzegovina)
2000–2003	Gilles Baron	(France)
2003–2006	Christophe Mazel	(France)
2006-2009	Alain Portes	(France)
2009–2011	Laurent Puigségur	(France)
2011–2014	Jérôme Chauvet	(France)
2014–2022	Franck Maurice	(France)
2022	Yann Balmossière	(France)
2022–2023	Ljubomir Vranjes	(Sweden)
2023–	Yann Balmossière	(France)
