= Abdérazak Hamad =

Algerian handball player (born 1975)

Personal information
- Full name: Abdérazak Hamad
- Nationality: Algerian
- Born: 25 June 1975 (age 51) Aïn Taya, Algeria
- Height: 1.82 m (5 ft 11 1/2 in)

Sport
- Sport: Handball
- Position: Pivot
- Current club: Retired

Senior clubs
- Years: Team
- 1994–1997: OC Alger
- 1997–2008: MC Alger
- 2008–2009: Chateauneuf HB
- 2009–2012: Pays d'Aix UC
National team
Years	Team	Apps	(Gls)
1996–2011	Algeria	201	(250)

Abdérazak Hamad (born June 25, 1975) is an Algerian former handballer, He played as a pivot for French sides Pays d'Aix Université Club Handball and Châteauneuf HB, as well as the Algerian sides OC Alger and MC Alger. Hamad was a key member of the Algerian national handball team, which he represented 201 times during his career.

Hamad was a member of the Algerian national team at the 2011 World Men's Handball Championship in Sweden.
