= Jean-Jacques Acquevillo =

French handball player (born 1989)

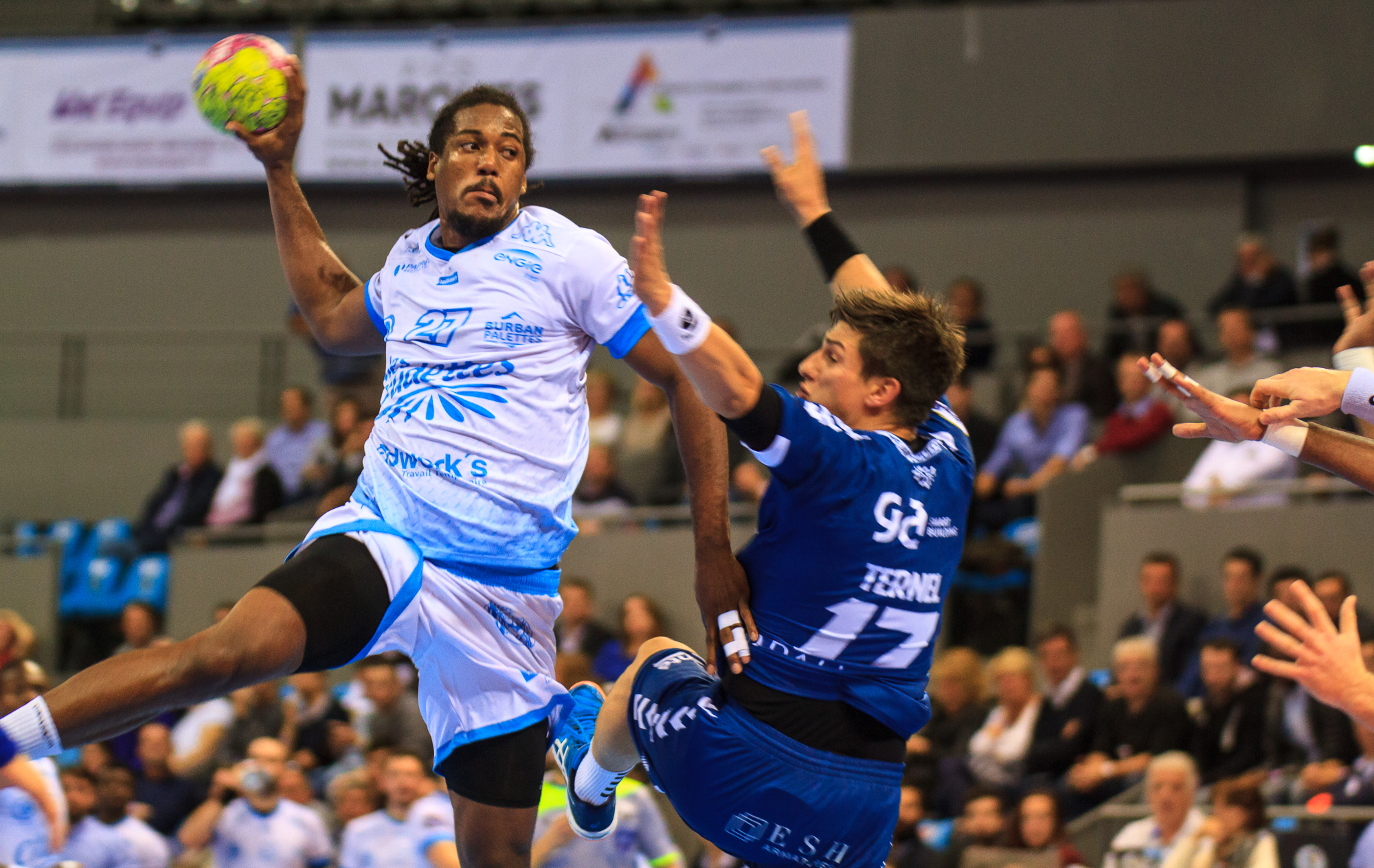

Personal information
- Nationality: French
- Born: 17 January 1989 (age 37) Le Lamentin, Martinique
- Height: 195 cm (77 in)

Sport
- Sport: Handball
- Position: Left back
- Current club: USAM Nîmes Gard
- Number: 27

Youth career
- Years: Team
- 2002-2006: FR Palmiste
- 2006-2008: SC Lamantinois

Senior clubs
- Years: Team
- 2008-2011: ALC Longvic
- 2011-2014: Grenoble-St-Martin-d'Hères
- 2014-2018: Saran Loiret Handball
- 2018-2019: Cesson Rennes Métropole HB
- 2019-: USAM Nîmes Gard
National team
Years	Team	Apps	(Gls)
2019-	France	14	(20)
- Updated on 26 December 2022

Jean-Jacques Acquevillo (born 17 January 1989 in Le Lamentin, Martinique) is a French handball player, playing for USAM Nîmes Gard.

== Career ==
Acquevillo started playing handball at FR Palmiste and SC Lamantinois in Martinique. In 2018 he joined ALC Longvic on the mainland, followed by third-tier side Grenoble-St-Martin-d'Hères. In 2014 he joined third-tier side Saran Loiret Handball. In his first season he was promoted with the team to the second tier. In 2016 he was promoted again, by winning the second tier French league. In the 2016-17 they survived relegation by only a goal difference of four to split them from US Créteil HB. The year after they were relegated however.

He then joined Cesson Rennes Métropole HB. After a season he joined USAM Nîmes Gard.

=== National team ===
Acquevillo debuted for the French national team on 13 June 2019 in a 37:17 away win against Lithuania.

He represented France at the 2021 World Men's Handball Championship in Egypt.
