= William Accambray =

French handball player (born 1988)

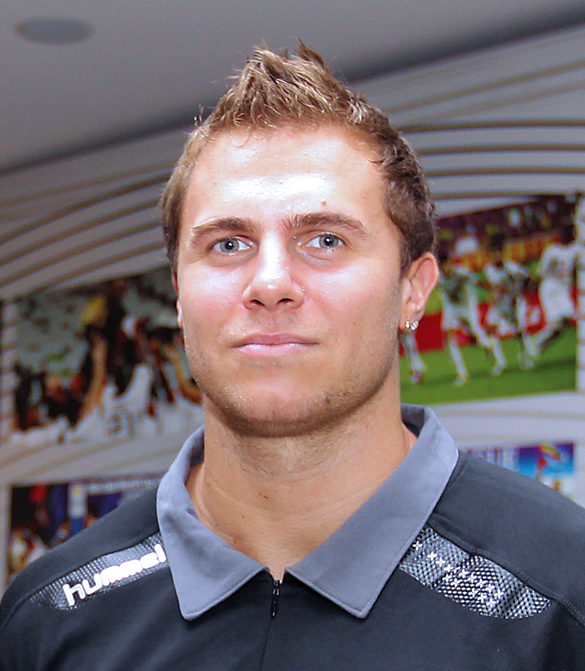

Personal information
- Nationality: French
- Born: 8 April 1988 (age 38) Cannes, France
- Height: 1.94 m (6 ft 4 in)

Sport
- Sport: Handball
- Position: Left back
- Current club: Saran Loiret Handball
- Number: 18

Youth career
- Years: Team
- 2002: ASPTT Grasse
- 2002–2003: HBMMS
- 2003–2005: Mandelieu
- 2005–2008: Montpellier HB

Senior clubs
- Years: Team
- 2008–2014: Montpellier HB
- 2014–2017: Paris Saint-Germain
- 2017–2019: Telekom Veszprém
- 2018–2019: → RK Celje (loan)
- 2019–2020: HC Meshkov Brest
- 2020–2023: Pays d'Aix UC
- 2023–: Saran Loiret Handball
National team
Years	Team	Apps	(Gls)
2009–	France	105	(223)
Medal record
Olympic Games
Gold medal – first place	2012 London	Team
World Championship
Gold medal – first place	2011 Sweden
Gold medal – first place	2015 Qatar
Gold medal – first place	2017 France
European Championship
Gold medal – first place	2010 Austria
Gold medal – first place	2014 Denmark
Mediterranean Games
Silver medal – second place	2009 Pescara	Team
- Updated on 17 August 2023

William Gérald Accambray (born 8 April 1988) is a French handball player who plays for Saran Loiret Handball and for the French national team.

With the French national team, he is a three time world champion, in 2011, 2015 and 2017.

He is the son of hammer thrower Jacques Accambray and Isabelle Accambray.

== Career ==
Accambray started playing handball at the age of 6 at ASPTT Grasse. At 14 he joined Handball Mougins Mouans-Sartoux. A year later he joined Mandelieu HB. His professional career started at HB Mougins Mouans-Sartoux Mandelieu in the French second tier.

In 2008 he joined top flight team Montpellier HB. In the 2010–11 season he was named the best player in the Division 1. In the 2011–12 season he extended his contract with Montpellier until 2016.

In 2014 he joined league rivals Paris Saint-Germain together with Thierry Omeyer.

In 2017 he joined Hungarian KC Veszprém.

From October 2018 until the end of the 2018–19 season he was loaned to Slovenian RK Celje. Afterwards he joined Belarusian team HC Meshkov Brest. After a year in Belarus he returned to France to join Pays d'Aix UC.

In 2023 he joined Saran Loiret Handball.

=== National team ===
Accambray debuted for the French national team on 19 May 2009 against Portugal.

His first medal for France was at the 2009 Mediterranean Games in Pescara. A year later he won the 2010 European Championship in Austria. In 2011 he won the 2011 World Championship beating Denmark in the final.

At the 2012 Olympics he won gold medals with the French team.

In 2014 he won the European Championship for a second time, and in 2015 he won the World Championship for a second time. His third world championship came in 2017.

== Achievements ==
- Olympic Games:
  - Winner: 2012
- World Championship:
  - Winner: 2011, 2015, 2014
- European Championship:
  - Winner: 2010, 2014
- LNH Division 1:
  - Winner: 2006, 2008, 2009, 2010, 2011, 2012
- Coupe de France:
  - Winner: 2006, 2008, 2009, 2010, 2012
- Belarusian championship:
  - Winner: 2020
