= Robin Cantegrel =

French handball player (born 1995)

Personal information
- Nationality: French
- Born: 13 February 1995 (age 31) Nantes, France
- Height: 1.93 m (6 ft 4 in)

Sport
- Sport: Handball
- Position: Goalkeeper
- Current club: HC Elbflorenz Dresden 2006
- Number: 77

Youth career
- Years: Team
- 2008–2017: HBC Nantes

Senior clubs
- Years: Team
- 2017–2019: Pontault-Combault Handball
- 2019–2020: Cesson Rennes MHB
- 2020–2021: RK Vardar 1961
- 2021–2022: Fenix Toulouse
- 2022–2024: Pontault-Combault Handball
- 2024–: HC Elbflorenz 2006
National team
Years	Team	Apps	(Gls)
2019–	France	1	(0)
- Updated on 30 August 2024

Robin Cantegrel (born 13 February 1995) is a French handball player who plays for HC Elbflorenz.
