= Rune Schrøder =

Danish handball player (born 1995)

Personal information
- Full name: Rune Hoyer Schrøder
- Nationality: Danish
- Born: 27 August 1995 (age 31) Tønder, Denmark
- Height: 1.94 m (6 ft 4 in)

Sport
- Sport: Handball
- Position: Left back
- Current club: Cesson Rennes MHB

Youth career
- Years: Team
- –: TM Tønder

Senior clubs
- Years: Team
- 2013–2018: TM Tønder
- 2018–2020: Fredericia HK
- 2020–2022: IK Sävehof
- 2022–: Cesson Rennes MHB

Rune Schrøder (born 27 August 1995) is a Danish handball player for Cesson Rennes MHB.

== Achievements ==
- Swedish Handball League
  - Winner: 2021
- Swedish Handball Cup
  - Winner: 2022
