= Luka Karabatic =

French handball player (born 1988)

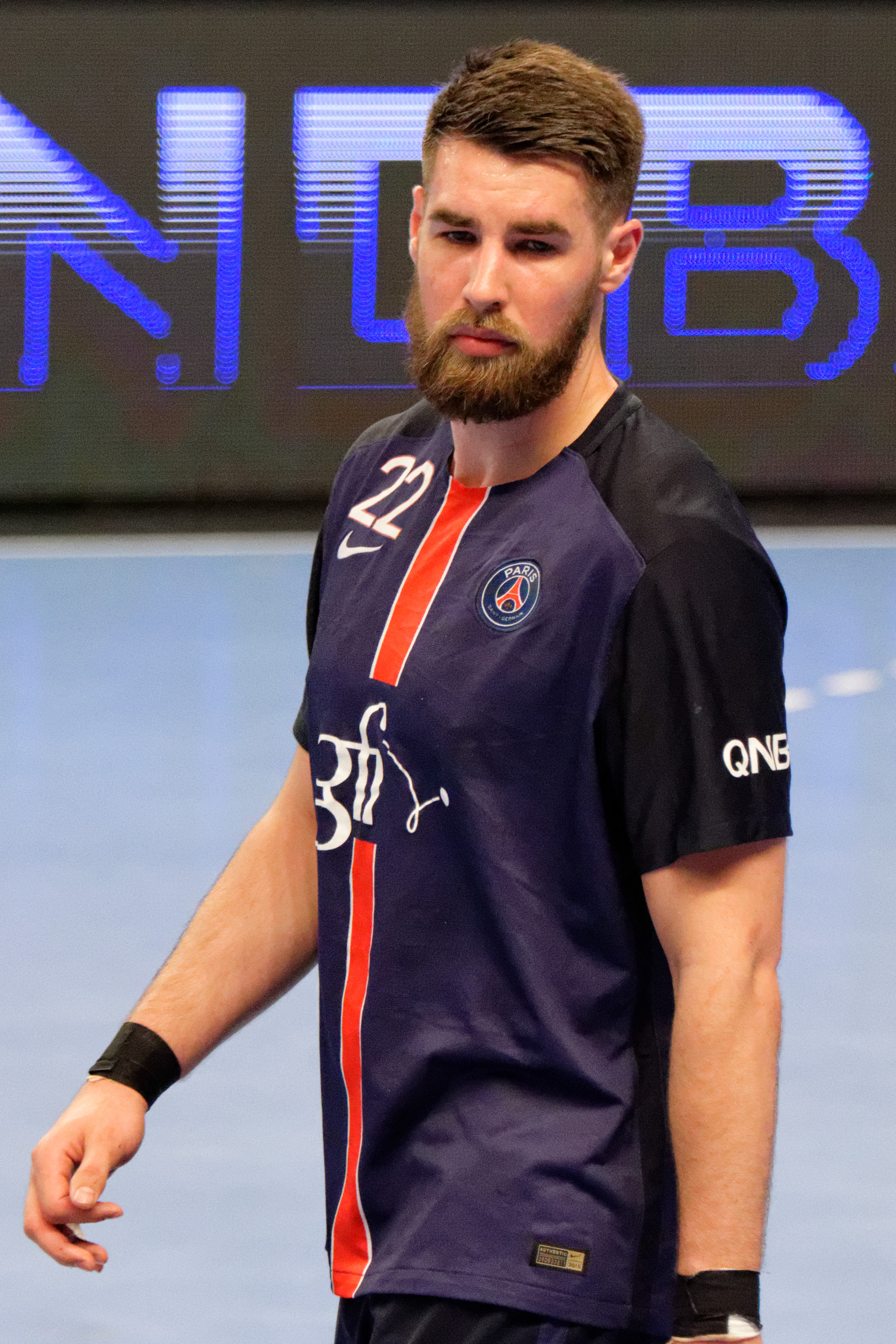
- Karabatic in 2016

Personal information
- Nationality: French
- Born: 19 April 1988 (age 38) Strasbourg, France
- Height: 2.02 m (6 ft 8 in)

Sport
- Sport: Handball
- Position: Pivot
- Current club: Paris Saint-Germain
- Number: 22

Senior clubs
- Years: Team
- 2008–2012: Montpellier Handball
- 2012–2015: Pays d'Aix UC
- 2015–: Paris Saint-Germain
National team
Years	Team	Apps	(Gls)
2011–2025	France	172	(182)
Medal record
Olympic Games
Gold medal – first place	2020 Tokyo	Team
Silver medal – second place	2016 Rio de Janeiro	Team
World Championship
Gold medal – first place	2015 Qatar
Gold medal – first place	2017 France
Silver medal – second place	2023 Poland/Sweden
Bronze medal – third place	2019 Germany/Denmark
Bronze medal – third place	2025 Croatia/Denmark/Norway
European Championship
Gold medal – first place	2014 Denmark
Gold medal – first place	2024 Germany
Bronze medal – third place	2018 Croatia
- Updated on 5 July 2024

Luka Karabatic (born 19 April 1988) is a French professional handball player for Paris Saint-Germain and formerly for the French national team.

He is the younger brother of Nikola Karabatić.

== Biography ==
Karabatic was born in France to Croatian dad and Serbian mom. He came from a handball family – his father, Branko who is originally from Trogir, Croatia, is a former Yugoslavian handballer who played as goalkeeper in the national team. His older brother, Nikola, is one of the best handball players in the world who was named best player in the world by IHF two times, but Karabatic decided to play tennis and won France championship for 10 years old in 1998. In 2007, when he was 19, Karabatic started to train handball with the youth team of Montpellier Handball as center back. In 2009, he joined the senior team of the club, in the same year his older brother returned to Montpellier AHB again.

In his first two years as professional player, Karabatic won the French championship two times in 2009 and 2010. After his two successful seasons in Montpellier, the club decided to extend his contract until 2016. He became the second pivot in rotation after Issam Tej. In June 2006, Karabatic debuted for France in a friendly tournament in Argentina.

On 30 September 2012, he was involved in a match-fixing and arrested with his brother Nikola and his wife. On 2 October, he was indicted and then released for €4,500. Few days after his release from custody, Karabatic released from Montpellier AHB because of "serious disciplinary offenses". He signed for Pays d'Aix Université, which only promoted to LNH Division 1, with his brother Nikola. In their first season in the club, the Karabatic brothers took the team to the 9th place in the league.

In 2014, Karabatic played for the first time with France in an official competition in EHF Euro in Denmark. In 2015 he won the World Championship with France.

In 2015 he signed for PSG Handball. Here he won the French Championship every year from 2016 to 2025, as well as the French Cup in 2017, 2021 and 2022 and the French League Cup in 2017, 2018 and 2019.

At the 2025 World Championship, he won bronze medals with France, losing to Croatia in the semifinal and beating Portugal in the third place playoff. He retired from the French national team in February 2025, 8 months after his brother had done so.

== Titles ==
- French Championship: (16) 2008, 2009, 2010, 2011, 2012, 2016, 2017, 2018, 2019, 2020, 2021, 2022, 2023, 2024, 2025, 2026
- Coupe de France: (7) 2008, 2009, 2010, 2012, 2018, 2021, 2022
- Coupe de la Ligue: (6) 2010, 2011, 2012, 2017, 2018, 2019
- Trophée des Champions: (6) 2010-2011, 2011-2012, 2015–2016, 2016-2017, 2018-2019, 2023-2024
- EHF Champions League:
  - Second-place: 2017

=== Personal Awards ===
- EHF Champions League best defender: 2016-17, 2017-18
- French Championship best defender: 2014-15
