= Rudi Prisăcaru =

Romanian handball player (born 1970)

Personal information
- Nationality: Romanian
- Born: 3 January 1970 (age 56) Sinești, Romania
- Height: 1.92 m (6 ft 4 in)

Sport
- Sport: Handball
- Position: Centre back

Youth career
- Years: Team
- –: (Romania) CSȘ Unirea Iași

Senior clubs
- Years: Team
- 1988–1993: (Romania) Dinamo București
- 1993–1995: (France) RC Strasbourg
- 1995–2002: (France) Fenix Toulouse
National team
Years	Team	Apps	(Gls)
1988–1998	Romania	213	(284)

Teams managed
- 2002–2005: (France) Fenix Toulouse
Medal record
Men's handball
Representing Romania
World Championship
Bronze medal – third place	1990 Czechoslovakia	Team

Rudi Prisăcaru (born 3 January 1970) is a Romanian handball coach and former player. He competed in the men's tournament at the 1992 Summer Olympics.

== Honours ==
Club
Fenix Toulouse

- Coupe de France
  - Winner: 1998
  - Finalist: 1999
