= Wesley Pardin =

French handball player (born 1990)

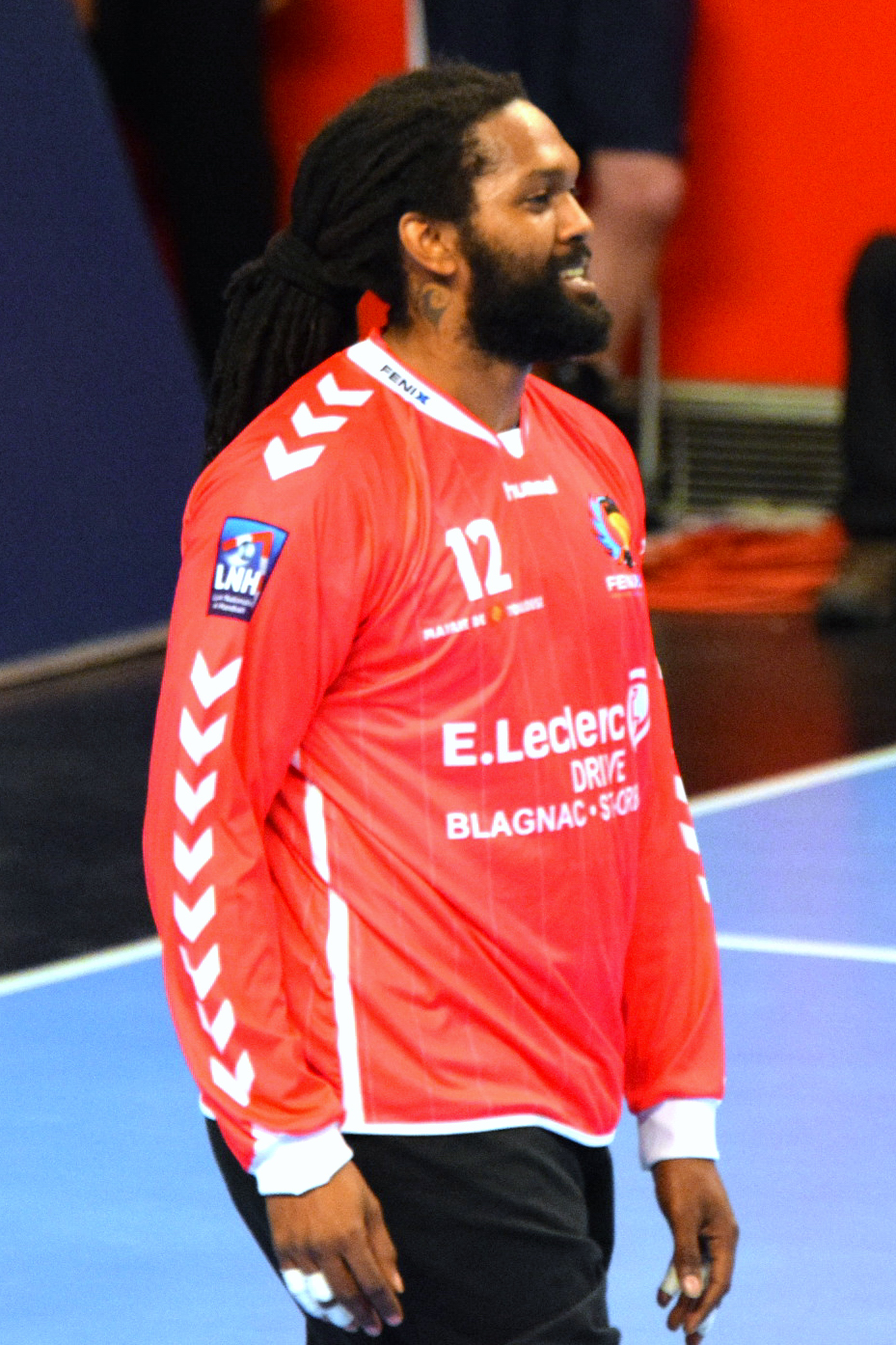

Personal information
- Nationality: French
- Born: 1 January 1990 (age 36) Le Lamentin, Martinique
- Height: 1.95 m (6 ft 5 in)

Sport
- Sport: Handball
- Position: Goalkeeper
- Current club: Pays d’Aix UC
- Number: 12

Senior clubs
- Years: Team
- 2008–2017: Fenix Toulouse Handball
- 2017–: Pays d’Aix UC
National team
Years	Team	Apps	(Gls)
2013–	France	34	(0)
- Updated on 31 August 2024

Wesley Pardin (born 1 January 1990 in Le Lamentin, Martinique) is a French handball player for Pays d’Aix UC and the French national team.

== Career ==
Hailing from Martinique, Pardin played soccer as a kid as a goalkeeper and change to handball at the age of 12.

In 2006 he joined the Fenix Touloouse youth team.

He debuted for the senior team in the 2007/08 season. In 2015 he reached the Coupe de France final with the team.

In 2017 he joined Pays d'Aix UC.

In 2024 he joined USAM Nîmes Gard.

=== National team ===
He debuted for the French national team on November 2nd 2013 in a 32:29 win against Norway. He represented France at the 2020 European Men's Handball Championship, where France finished 7th.

At the 2022 European Men's Handball Championship he was also in the French team as a backup to Vincent Gérard. He did however not play.
