= Hichem Kaabeche =

Algerian handball player (born 1990)

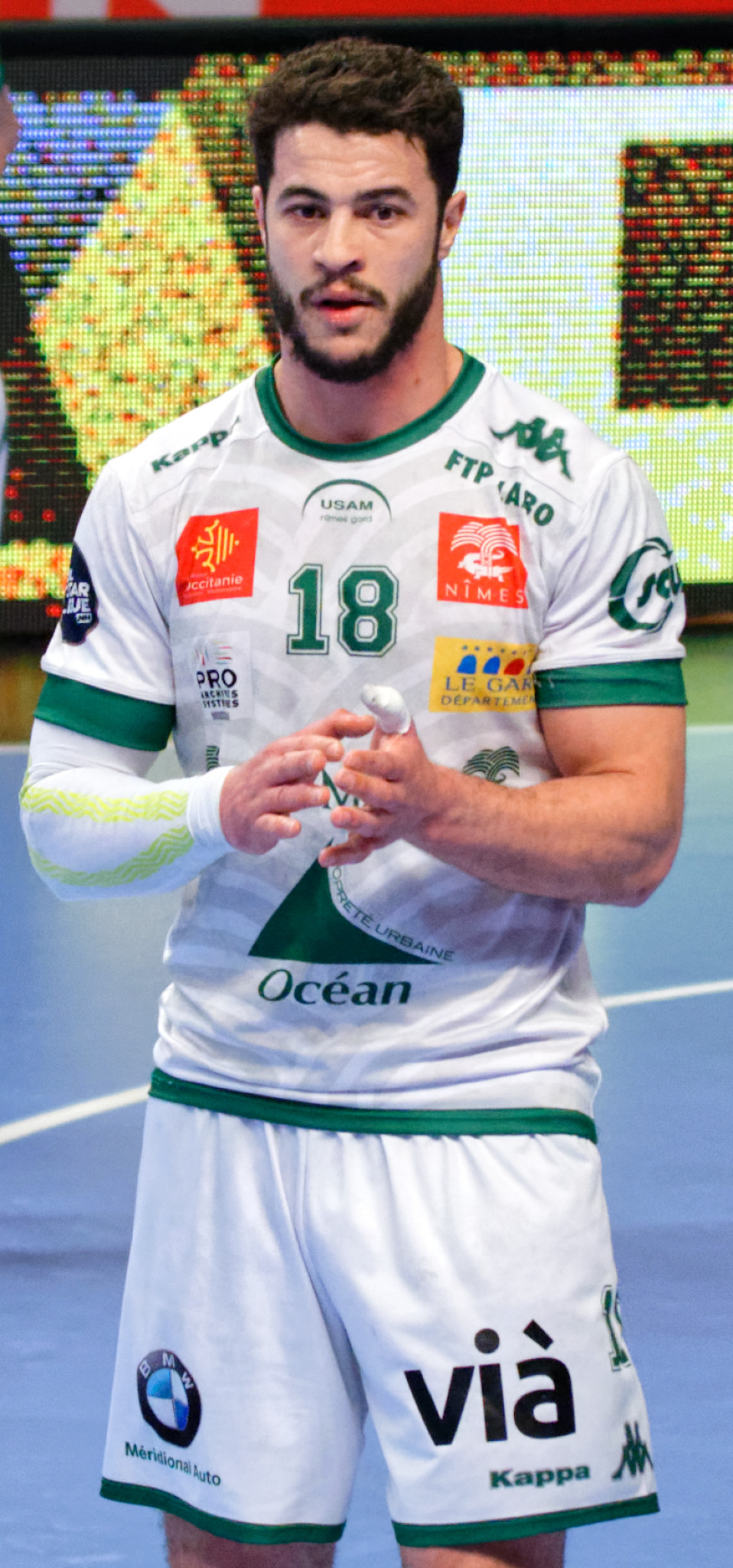

Personal information
- Nationality: Algerian
- Born: 12 March 1990 (age 36) Skikda, Algeria
- Height: 1.91 m (6 ft 3 in)

Sport
- Sport: Handball
- Position: Pivot

Senior clubs
- Years: Team
- 2009–2016: (Algeria) JSE Skikda
- 2016–2017: (France) Istres Provence Handball
- 2017–2020: (France) USAM Nîmes Gard
- 2018–2019: (France) → Pontault-Combault Handball
- 2020–2021: (Qatar) Al Ahli SC
- 2021: (Turkey) → Beşiktaş
- 2021–2022: (France) Villeurbanne
- 2022–2024: (Turkey) Beşiktaş
National team
Years	Team	Apps	(Gls)
2010–2024	Algeria	97	(152)
Medal record
African Championship
Gold medal – first place	2014 Algeria
Silver medal – second place	2012 Morocco
Silver medal – second place	2024 Egypt
Bronze medal – third place	2020 Tunisia

Hichem Kaabeche (born 12 March 1990) is an Algerian former handball player.

He competed for the Algerian national team at the 2015 World Men's Handball Championship in Qatar.

He also participated at the 2013 and 2015 World Championships.
