= Wael Horri =

Tunisian handball player and coach

Personal information
- Nationality: Tunisian
- Born: 20 March 1982 (age 44) Menzel Temime, Tunisia
- Height: 1.93 m (6 ft 4 in)

Sport
- Sport: Handball
- Position: Left back

Senior clubs
- Years: Team
- 2000–2001: TUN US Témimienne
- 2002–2005: TUN ES Sahel
- 2005–2006: DE TV Großwallstadt
- 2006–2008: TUN Club africain
- 2008–2010: TUN ES Tunis
- 2010–2012: FRA Cesson Rennes MHB
National team
- Years: Team
- 2002–2012: Tunisia

Teams managed
- 2014–2017: TV Olpe
- 2020–2021: FT Fulda
- 2021–: SG Ratingen

Wael Horri (born 20 March 1982) is a Tunisian retired handball player and current coach.

== Club career ==
In September 2005, he left team ES Sahel for playing in the Bundesliga for team TV Großwallstadt, where he played alongside Dominik Klein, Carsten Lichtlein and Alexander Petersson.

In 2010, he moved to France, where he played with Cesson Rennes MHB for two years, until he ended his career in 2012.

In France, he obtained a coaching license and managed a second division club, before being finally hired at TV Olpe in 2014, where he played for two championships as a player-coach.

== Honours ==
=== National team ===
- 10th place in 2000 Summer Olympics (Australia)
- 4th place in 2012 Summer Olympics (United Kingdom)

World Men's Handball Championship

- 4th place in 2005 World Men's Handball Championship (Tunisia)

World Cup Handball

- 2006 World Cup silver medalist (Sweden)

African Men's Handball Championship

- Silver medal in 2004 African Men's Handball Championship (Egypt)
- Gold medal in 2006 African Men's Handball Championship (Tunisia)

=== Club ===
Tunisian Handball League

- Winner: 2003, 2009, 2010

Tunisian Handball Cup

- Winner: 2007

Arab Handball Championship of Champions

- Winner: 2004
