= Yann Genty =

French handball player (born 1981)

Yann Genty OLY
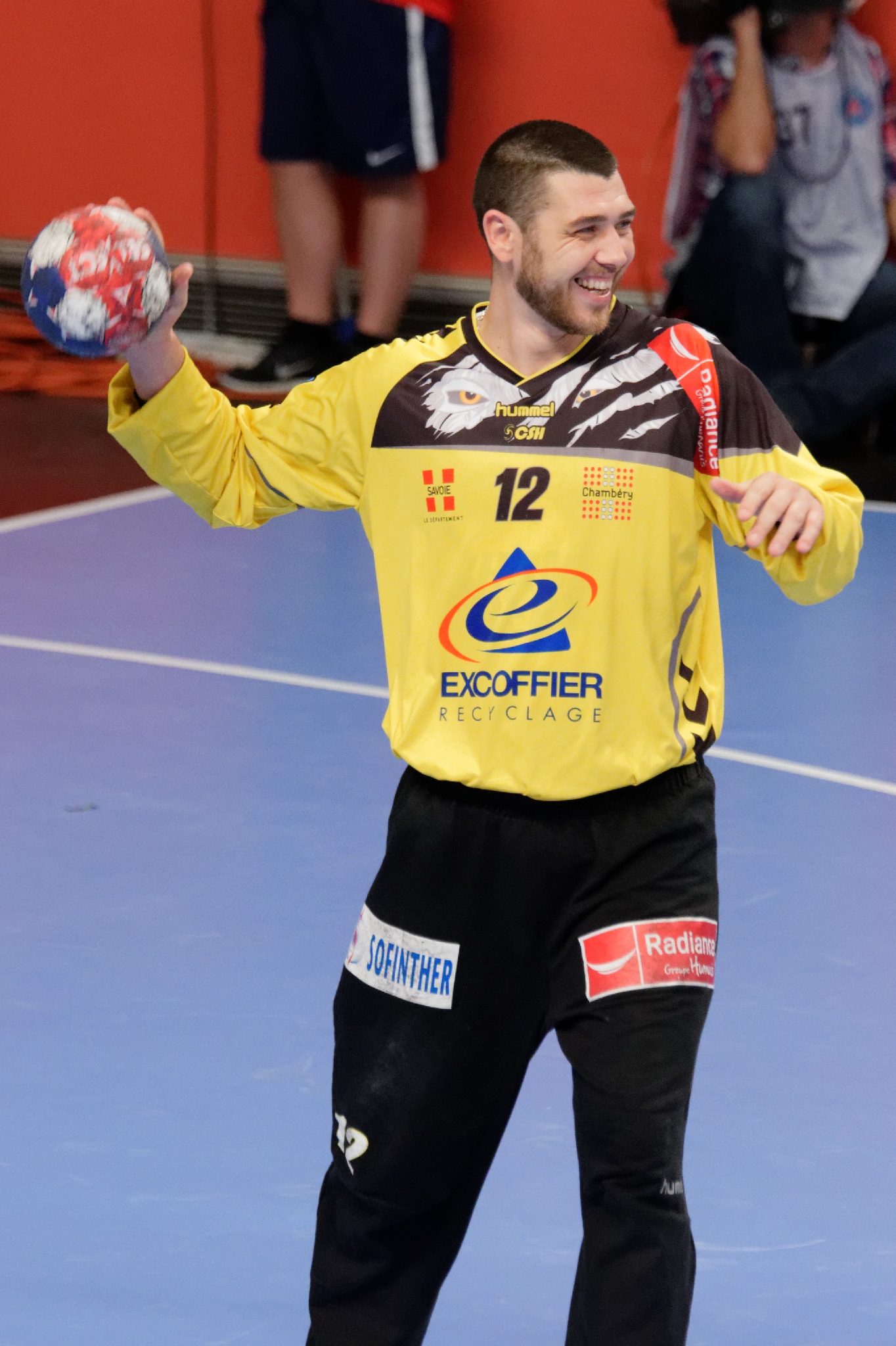
- Genty in 2015

Personal information
- Nationality: French
- Born: 26 December 1981 (age 44) Enghien-les-Bains, France
- Height: 1.85 m (6 ft 1 in)

Sport
- Sport: Handball
- Position: Goalkeeper
- Current club: AEK Athens
- Number: 12

Senior clubs
- Years: Team
- 2006–2008: Billère Handball
- 2008–2010: Aurillac HB CA
- 2010–2012: Istres PH
- 2012–2014: Cesson Rennes MHB
- 2014–2020: Chambéry SMBH
- 2020–2022: Paris Saint-Germain
- 2022–2023: Limoges Handball
- 2023–2024: Saran Loiret Handball
- 2024–: AEK Athens
National team
Years	Team	Apps	(Gls)
2019–2021	France	27	(0)
Medal record
Olympic Games
Gold medal – first place	2020 Tokyo	Team

Yann Genty OLY (born 26 December 1981) is a French handball player for AEK Athens.

He represented France at the 2020 European Men's Handball Championship.

== Individual awards ==
- French Championship Best Goalkeeper: 2015, 2019
