= Cyril Dumoulin =

French handball player (born 1984)

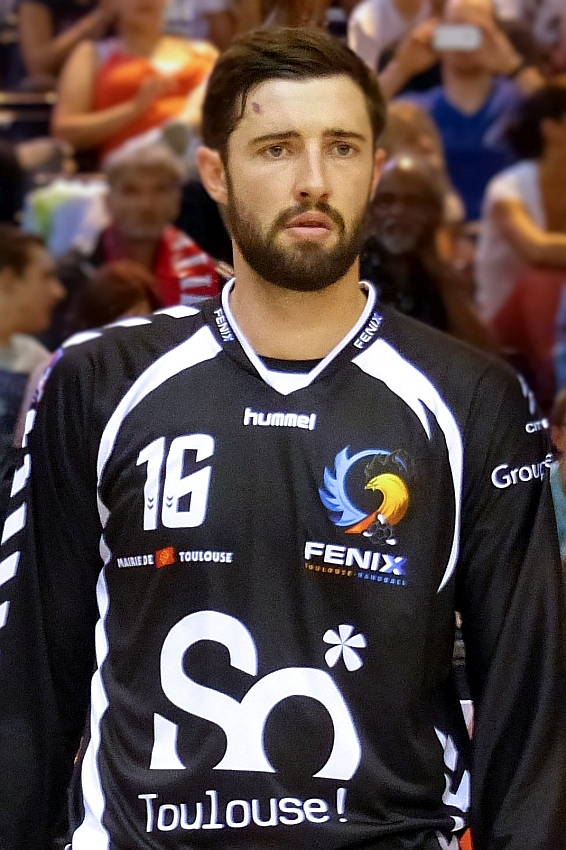

Personal information
- Nationality: French
- Born: 2 February 1984 (age 42) Rillieux-la-Pape, France
- Height: 2.00 m (6 ft 7 in)

Sport
- Sport: Handball
- Position: Goalkeeper
- Current club: Tremblay-en-France Handball
- Number: 16

Youth career
- Years: Team
- 1997–2000: Bourgoin-Jallieu
- 2000–2004: Chambéry SH

Senior clubs
- Years: Team
- 2004–2014: Chambéry SH
- 2014–2016: Fenix Toulouse HB
- 2016–2021: HBC Nantes
- 2021–2025: Tremblay-en-France Handball
National team
Years	Team	Apps	(Gls)
2009–2025	France	91	(0)
Medal record
World Championship
Gold medal – first place	2015 Qatar
Bronze medal – third place	2019 Germany/Denmark
European Championship
Gold medal – first place	2014 Denmark
Bronze medal – third place	2018 Croatia
Mediterranean Games
Silver medal – second place	2009 Pescara	Team

Cyril Dumoulin (born 2 February 1984) is a French former handball player who played for the French national team.

In 2015 he won gold medals at the 2015 World Men's Handball Championship.

== Career ==
Dumoulin started playing handball at Bourgoin-Jallieu, before joining Chambéry SH in 2000. Here he made his senior debut in 2004. In 2014 he joined Fenix Toulouse Handball to replace Gonzalo Perez de Vargas, who had joined FC Barcelona Handbol. Two years later he joined HBC Nantes. It was originally planned, that he would join the club in between the 2015-16 and 2016-17 season, but due to injury to Nantes' starting goalkeeper Gorazd Skof, he joined already in April 2016. With Nantes he won the 2017 French Cup and reached the final of the 2017-18 EHF Champions League, where Nantes lost to league rivals Montpellier Handball.

In 2021 he joined Tremblay-en-France Handball. He retired after the 2024-25 season.

=== National team ===
Dumoulin made his debut for the French national team on 21 June 2009 against Latvia. For much of his tenure on the French national team, he was the back-up to either Daouda Karaboué or Thierry Omeyer. With France he won silver medals at the 2009 Mediterranean Games. He also represented France at the 2014 European Men's Handball Championship. At the 2015 World Men's Handball Championship he won gold medals.

In 2018 he won his third medal with France, when they took bronze at the 2018 European Men's Handball Championship. He participated at the 2019 World Men's Handball Championship where France won bronze medals.

== Titles ==
- Coupe de France
  - Winner: 2017
- Coupe de la Ligue
  - Winner: 2011, 2017
- Trophée des Champions
  - Winner: 2013, 2017
