= Istres Provence Handball =

French handball club

- Full name: Istres Provence Handball
- Founded: 1970; 56 years ago
- Arena: Halle polyvalente
- Capacity: 2,000
- President: Alain Felzen
- Head coach: Gilles Derot
- League: LNH Division 1
- 2024–25: LNH Division 1, 13th of 16
- Club colours
Home	Away

Istres Provence Handball is a handball club from Istres, France. Currently, Istres Provence Handball competes in the French First League of Handball.

Location of Istres Provence Handball

== Crest, colours, supporters ==
=== Naming history ===
Name	Period
Istres Sports	1970–2003
Istres Ouest Provence Handball	2003–2016
Istres Provence Handball	2016–present

=== Kits ===
HOME
2012-13	2017-18	2020-21	2021-

AWAY
2011-12	2012-13	2017–18	2020-21	2021-

== Team ==
=== Current squad ===
Squad for the 2022–23 season

Istres Provence Handball

Goalkeepers

- 12 (France) Hugo Bonnat
- 33 (Spain) Xoan Manuel Ledo
- 70 (France) Clément Gaudin

Left Wingers

- 25 (Serbia) Marko Nikolic
- 77 (France) Arthur Jund

Right Wingers

- 8 (Italy) Thomas Bortoli
- 10 (Denmark) Rasmus Nielsen

Line players

- 32 (Italy) Andrea Parisini
- 27 (France) Jotham Mandiangu
- 68 (France) Edgar Dentz

Left Backs

- 6 (Denmark) Oliver Eggert
- 11 (Algeria) Messaoud Berkous
- 13 (France) Lubin Gensoulen
- 26 (Lithuania) Lukas Simėnas

Central Backs

- 18 (Sweden) Henrik Olsson
- 76 (France) Lucas Vanegue

Right Backs

- 7 (Spain) Alejandro Márquez
- 17 (Belgium) Raphaël Kotters

=== Technical staff ===
- Head Coach: (France) Gilles Derot

=== Transfers ===
Transfers for the 2026–27 season

Joining

- (Latvia) Jevgenijs Rogonovs (LP) from (Spain) BM Villa de Aranda
- (Denmark) Julius Christian Sten (GK) from (Denmark) SønderjyskE Herrehåndbold
- (Spain) Pau Oliveras (LB) from (Portugal) S.L. Benfica
- (France) Matthieu Ong (LW) from (France) Pays d'Aix Université Club
- (France) Louis Despreaux (RB) from (France) Pays d'Aix Université Club
- (France) Léo Martinez (CB) from (Denmark) Nordsjælland Håndbold
- (France) Arnaud Tabarand (GK) from (France) Pau Billère Handball
- (France) Thomas Toupance (LB) from (France) Pontault-Combault Handball

Leaving

- (Egypt) Mohammad Sanad (RW) to (France) USAM Nîmes Gard
- (Cape Verde) (Portugal) Edmilson Araújo (LB) to (France) C' Chartres MHB
- (Belgium) Nick Deekens (GK) to (Germany) TSV Bayer Dormagen
- (Iran) Mohammad Reza Oraei (RB) to (Romania) CS Universitatea Cluj
- (Croatia) Jakov Dujić (CB) to (Croatia) HRK Gorica
- (France) Romain Mathias (GK) to (France) Sélestat Alsace Handball
- (France) Aurélien Padolus (LB) to (Portugal) S.L. Benfica
- (France) Nathy Camara (LW) to (France) ROC Aveyron Handball
- (France) Lubin Gensoulen (CB) to (France) Valence Drôme Handball

=== Transfer History ===
Transfers for the 2025–26 season

Joining

- (Egypt) Mohammad Sanad (RW) from (France) USAM Nîmes Gard
- (Iran) Mohammad Reza Oraei (RB) from (Romania) AHC Potaissa Turda
- (Sweden) Assar Kammenhed (RB) from (Denmark) Nordsjælland Håndbold
- (Croatia) Jakov Dujić (CB) from (Croatia) HRK Gorica
- (France) Aurélien Padolus (LB) from (France) Pontault-Combault Handball
- (France) Guénolé Gaillard (LB) from (France) Frontignan Thau HB
- (France) Nathy Camara (LW) from (France) Frontignan Thau HB
- (France) Robin Dourte (LP) from (France) Handball Club Cournon d'Auvergne

Leaving

- (Croatia) Josip Božić Pavletić (RW) to (Romania) SCM Politehnica Timișoara
- (Argentina) Nicolás Bono (CB) to (North Macedonia) RK Vardar
- (Spain) Josep Folqués Ortiz (LW) to (France) Cesson Rennes MHB
- (Belgium) Raphael Kötters (RB) to Tremblay-en-France Handball
- (Denmark) Torben Petersen (LB) to Tremblay-en-France Handball
- (France) Louis Joseph (RB) to (France) US Créteil Handball
- Geoffroy Carabasse (LP) to Tremblay-en-France Handball
- (France) Marin Langlais (LW) to (France) JS Cherbourg
- (France) Jean-Philippe Takaniua (LP) to (France) Handball Club Cournon d'Auvergne

Transfers for the 2022–23 season

Joining

- (Spain) Xoan Ledo (GK) from (Spain) Bidasoa Irún
- (Spain) Alejandro Márquez Coloma (RB) from (Spain) BM Granollers
- (Denmark) Oliver Nøddesbo Eggert (LB) from (Denmark) SønderjyskE Håndbold
- (France) Lucas Vanegue (CB) from (France) JS Cherbourg

Leaving

- (France) Guillaume Crépain (CB) (retires)
- (France) Arnaud Tabarand (GK) to (France) Cesson Rennes MHB
- (France) Andréa Guillaume (RW) to (France) Limoges Handball
- (Tunisia) Oussama Hosni (RB) to (North Macedonia) RK Eurofarm Pelister
- (Denmark) Jakob Mikkelsen (RB) to (Portugal) FC Porto
- (Spain) Juan José Fernández (LB) to (Spain) BM Ciudad Encantada

== Honors ==
- Coupe de la Ligue: 1

Winner : 2009

- LNH Division 2: 2

Champion : 1995, 2018

== Former club members ==
=== Notable former players ===
- (France) Théo Derot (2014–2015, 2019)
- (France) Frédéric Dole (1999-2004)
- (France) Christian Gaudin (1995–1997)
- (France) Yann Genty (2010–2012)
- (France) Vincent Gérard (2008-2010)
- (France) Samuel Honrubia (2021-)
- (France) Frédéric Louis (1998-2000)
- (France) Bruno Martini (1994-1995)
- (France) Olivier Maurelli (2000–2002)
- (France) Sébastien Mongin (2000–2004)
- (France) Laurent Munier (1996-1997)
- (France) Raoul Prandi (1998-2000)
- (France) Luc Tobie (2009–2012)
- (Algeria) Omar Benali (2008-2009)
- (Algeria) Messaoud Berkous (2021-)
- (Algeria) Sassi Boultif (2008-2012)
- (Algeria) Hichem Daoud (2016-2021)
- (Algeria) Hichem Kaabeche (2016–2017)
- (Algeria) Tahar Labane (2000–2008)
- (Algeria) Abdelkader Rahim (2015–2016)
- (Argentina) Gonzalo Carou (2014-2015)
- (Argentina) Federico Matías Vieyra (2012–2015)
- (Austria) Thomas Bauer (2015-2016)
- (Belgium) Thomas Bolaers (2009-2010)
- (Belgium) Bram Dewit (2013-2014)
- (Chile) Erwin Feuchtmann (2018-2019)
- (Croatia) Zlatko Saračević (1995-1997)
- (Czech Republic) David Juříček (2003-2004)
- (Czech Republic) Tomáš Řezníček (2012–2014)
- (Czech Republic) Petr Štochl (2004-2006)
- (Czech Republic) Jiří Vítek (2004-2007)
- (Italy) Andrea Parisini (2019-)
- (Latvia) Ingars Dude (2013-2015)
- (Montenegro) Vasko Ševaljević (2019-2021)
- (Romania) Alexandru Dedu (1996-1997)
- (Senegal) Ibrahima Diaw (2009-2011)
- (Slovenia) Aljoša Rezar (2013-2014)
- (Serbia) Nebojša Stojinović (2001-2004)
- (Serbia) (Croatia) Stefan Vujić (2014-2015)
- (Serbia) Aleksandar Stojanović (handballer) (2018-2019)
- (Tunisia) Kamel Alouini (2008-2010)
- (Tunisia) Mehdi Harbaoui (2014-2020)
- (Tunisia) Oussama Hosni (2019-2022)

=== Former coaches ===
Seasons	Coach	Country
2000–2004	Gilles Derot	(France)
2004–2006	Jan Bašný	(Czech Republic)
2006–2007	Gilles Derot	(France)
2007–2013	Christophe Mazel	(France)
2013-	Gilles Derot	(France)
