= Nikola Karabatić =

French handball player (born 1984)

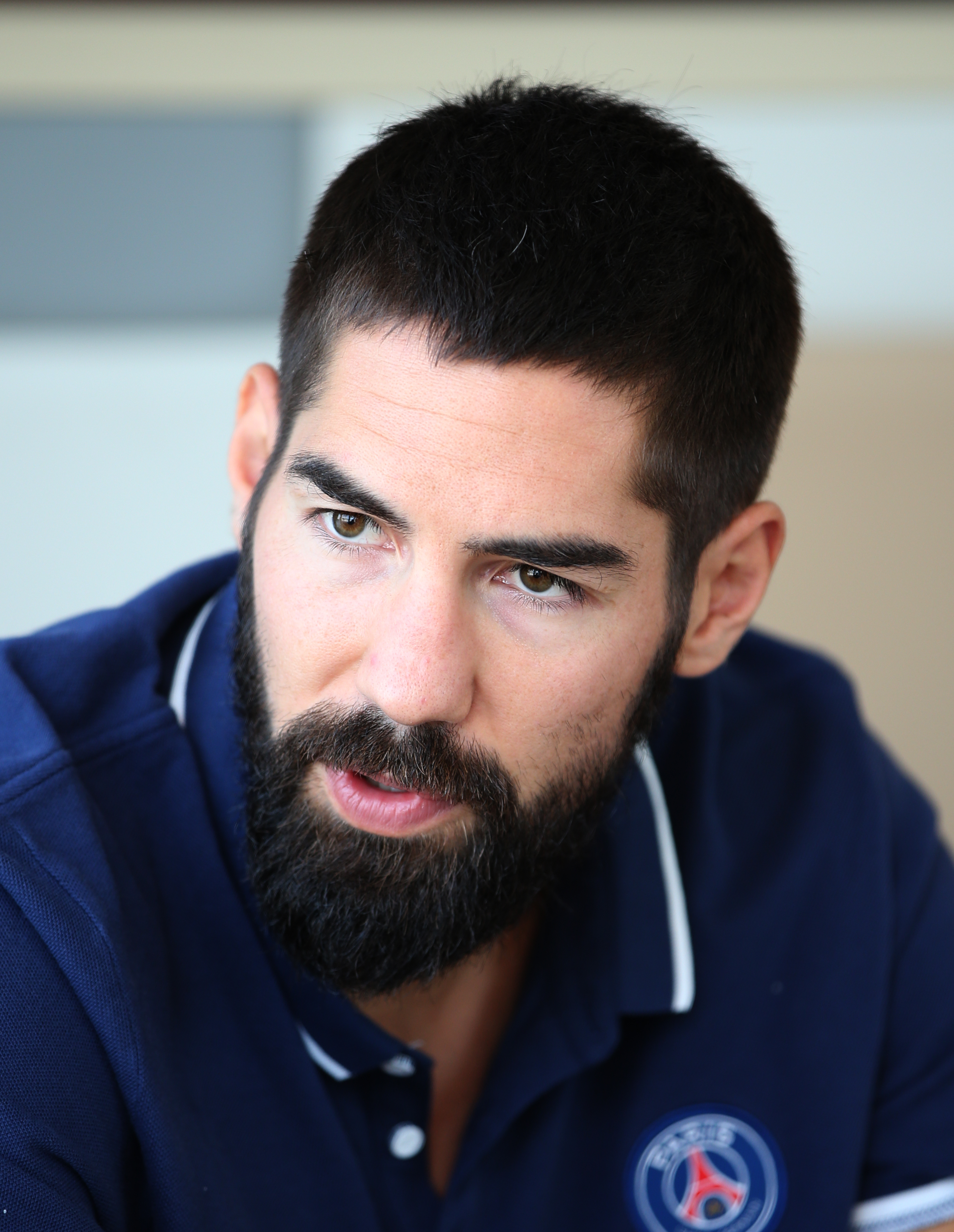
- Karabatić in 2015

Personal information
- Nationality: French
- Born: 11 April 1984 (age 42) Niš, SR Serbia, Yugoslavia
- Height: 1.96 m (6 ft 5 in)

Sport
- Sport: Handball
- Position: Centre back

Senior clubs
- Years: Team
- 2000–2005: Montpellier Handball
- 2005–2009: THW Kiel
- 2009–2013: Montpellier Handball
- 2013: Pays d'Aix
- 2013–2015: FC Barcelona
- 2015–2024: Paris Saint-Germain
National team
Years	Team	Apps	(Gls)
2002–2024	France	365	(1303)
Medal record
Representing France
Olympic Games
Gold medal – first place	2008 Beijing	Team
Gold medal – first place	2012 London	Team
Gold medal – first place	2020 Tokyo	Team
Silver medal – second place	2016 Rio de Janeiro	Team
World Championship
Gold medal – first place	2009 Croatia
Gold medal – first place	2011 Sweden
Gold medal – first place	2015 Qatar
Gold medal – first place	2017 France
Silver medal – second place	2023 Poland/Sweden
Bronze medal – third place	2005 Tunisia
Bronze medal – third place	2019 Germany/Denmark
European Championship
Gold medal – first place	2006 Switzerland
Gold medal – first place	2010 Austria
Gold medal – first place	2014 Denmark
Gold medal – first place	2024 Germany
Bronze medal – third place	2008 Norway
Bronze medal – third place	2018 Croatia

Nikola Karabatić (born 11 April 1984) is a French former professional handball player who was named IHF World Player of the Year a male record-tying three times, in 2007, 2014, and 2016. He is regarded as one of the greatest players in handball history.

With the French national handball team, he won three Olympic gold medals (Summer Olympics of 2008, 2012 and 2020), four World Championship gold medals (2009, 2011, 2015, and 2017) as well as four gold medals in the European Championship (2006, 2010, 2014, and 2024). He also won L'Équipe Champion of Champions in 2011.

He was inducted into the EHF Hall of Fame in 2024.

== Club career ==
Karabatić began his professional career at the top French club Montpellier HB. There he became French champion in 2002, 2003, 2004 and 2005 as well as winner of the EHF Champions League in 2003. He then played for the German club THW Kiel, who became German champions in 2006, 2007, 2008 and 2009, and won the EHF Champions League in 2007. In the summer of 2009 he left Germany and returned to Montpellier HB, winning three further French champion titles in 2010, 2011 and 2012. After a quick stay in Pays d'Aix Université Club handball, Aix-en-Provence, between February and June in 2013, he moved to FC Barcelona and then in 2015 for PSG Handball, where he played until his retirement in 2024.

== International career ==
He is an Olympic, World and European champion. This makes eleven titles out of 17 medals won, which constitutes an absolute record.

He first became a European champion in the 2006 European Men's Handball Championship, subsequently becoming a bronze medallist in the 2008 edition of the championship (without forgetting 2018). He has received two more bronze medals at the World Championships, in 2005 and 2019. At the 2007 World Men's Handball Championship, he was voted into the All-Star Team in which France finished fourth. He was also voted into the All Star Team at the 2004 European Men's Handball Championship.

== Personal life ==
Karabatić was born in Niš, SFR Yugoslavia, to a Croatian father and Serbian mother. Karabatić's father Branko Karabatić, who was also a professional handball player, is originally from Vrsine, a village between Trogir and Marina in Croatia. In his career, Branko played for the Železničar handball team from Niš, which is where he met his wife Radmila, who is originally from Aleksinac, Serbia. The family moved to France after Karabatić's father got a coaching job there when Karabatić was 3 1/2 years old. His younger brother, Luka, is also a professional handball player.

On 30 September 2012, he was involved in match-fixing and was arrested alongside his wife and his brother Luka.

In addition to French and Serbo-Croatian, he speaks English, German and Spanish.

== Major tournament statistics ==
Legend
Tnmt	Tournament	GP	Games played	Gls	Goals
Sh	Shots	G%	Goal percentage	7G	7-meter goals
7S	7-meter shots	As	Assists	AG	Assists and Goals
St	Steals	Bl	Blocks	2M	2 Minute Suspensions
RC	Red Cards	Pl	Placement of National Team	**Bold**	Career high
	Led the Tournament		Tournament MVP		On All-Star Team

As of conclusion of 2024 Summer Olympics - Men's Handball Tournament

Tnmt	GP	Gls	Sh	G%	7G	7S	As	AG	St	Bl	2M	RC	Pl
2004 EC	7	35	71	49	**8**	13	21	56	4	3	4	0	6th
2004 OG	7	20	39	51	2	2	16	36	2	1	5	0	5th
2005 WC	9	43	71	61	5	5	20	63	8	4	5	0	3rd
2006 EC	8	40	72	56	0	1	14	54	10	4	4	0	1st
2007 WC	**10**	50	86	58	0	2	24	74	**13**	4	7	1	4th
2008 EC	8	44	**89**	49	7	**14**	26	70	6	5	2	0	3rd
2008 OG	8	37	69	54	2	3	34	71	7	6	2	0	1st
2009 WC	**10**	45	80	56	0	0	36	81	8	9	2	0	1st
2010 EC	8	40	73	55	0	0	25	65	5	4	6	0	1st
2011 WC	**10**	**51**	80	63	0	0	34	**85**	4	10	2	0	1st
2012 EC	6	9	34	26	0	0	11	20	3	1	1	0	11th
2012 OG	8	26	48	54	0	0	34	60	3	**15**	3	0	1st
2013 WC	7	25	38	**66**	0	0	12	37	3	10	3	0	6th
2014 EC	8	32	51	63	0	0	**44**	76	3	6	4	0	1st
2015 WC	9	33	56	59	0	0	26	59	8	14	**9**	0	1st
2016 EC	7	26	47	55	0	0	21	47	5	3	2	0	5th
2016 OG	8	26	40	65	0	0	21	47	4	4	2	0	2nd
2017 WC	9	31	53	58	0	0	42	73	7	5	4	0	1st
2018 EC	8	30	46	65	0	0	33	63	3	3	3	0	3rd
2019 WC	6	4	15	27	0	0	15	19	1	1	3	0	3rd
2020 EC	3	8	13	62	0	0	5	13	0	2	0	0	14th
2021 WC	Not in team												
2020 OG	8	22	34	65	0	0	29	51	1	1	3	0	1st
2022 EC	8	15	36	42	0	0	22	37	2	3	3	0	4th
2023 WC	7	8	18	44	0	0	12	20	0	1	0	0	2nd
2024 EC	8	16	27	59	0	0	22	38	1	0	0	0	1st
2024 OG	6	6	11	55	0	0	8	14	2	0	0	0	8th

== Achievements ==
=== Club ===
- EHF Champions League:
  - Winner in 2003, 2007, 2015
  - Runners up in 2008, 2009, 2017
- IHF Super Globe: 2013, 2014
- European Super Cup: 2007
- French league: 2002, 2003, 2004, 2005, 2010, 2011, 2012, 2016, 2017, 2018, 2019, 2020, 2021, 2022, 2023, 2024
- French Cup: 2001, 2002, 2003, 2005, 2010, 2012, 2018, 2021, 2022
- French League Cup: 2004, 2005, 2010, 2011, 2012, 2017, 2018
- French Supercup: 2010, 2011, 2015, 2016, 2019, 2023
- German league: 2006, 2007, 2008, 2009
- German Cup: 2007, 2008, 2009
- German Supercup: 2005, 2007, 2008
- Spanish league: 2014, 2015
- Spanish Cup: 2014, 2015
- Spanish supercup: 2013, 2014
- Asobal Cup: 2013, 2014
- Catalonia Supercup: 2013, 2014
- Pyrenees league: 2004

=== International ===
- Olympics
  - Gold: 2008, 2012, 2020
  - Silver: 2016
- World Championship
  - Gold: 2009, 2011, 2015, 2017
  - Silver: 2023
  - Bronze: 2005, 2019
- European Championship
  - Gold: 2006, 2010, 2014, 2024
  - Bronze: 2008, 2018
- World Cup 2002
- Tournoi de France: 2007, 2011

=== Individual ===
- IHF World Player of the Year – Men
  - Winner: 2007, 2014, 2016
  - Second: 2009, 2010, 2015
  - Third: 2011
- With French national team:
  - Most Valuable Player (MVP) of the World Championship (2): 2011, 2017
  - Most Valuable Player (MVP) of the European Championship (2): 2008, 2014
  - Top Scorer of the European Championship: 2008
  - All-Star Centre back of the Olympic Games: 2012, 2016
  - All-Star Centre back of the World Championship: 2009, 2015
  - All-Star Centre back of the European Championship: 2010
  - All-Star Left back of the World Championship: 2007
  - All-Star Left back of the European Championship: 2004
  - Best player of Tournoi de France: 2007, 2011
- With clubs:
  - Champions League
    - Top scorer: 2007 (89 goals)
    - All-stars team: 2014
  - France
    - Best player of French league: 2010, 2013, 2017
    - Best left back of French league: 2004, 2005
    - Best center back of French league: 2010, 2016, 2017
    - Best player of French supercup: 2010
  - Germany
    - Best player of the year in Germany: 2007, 2008
    - Best player of the season in German league: 2006–07, 2007–08
    - Best left back in German league: 2006, 2007, 2008
    - Best player of German All-stars game: 2007
  - Spain
    - Best player of Spanish league: 2014, 2015
- Others
  - Sportsman on France: 2011
  - EHF Hall of Fame in 2024.

== See also ==
- List of men's handballers with 1000 or more international goals
