= Jesper Konradsson =

Swedish handball player (born 1994)

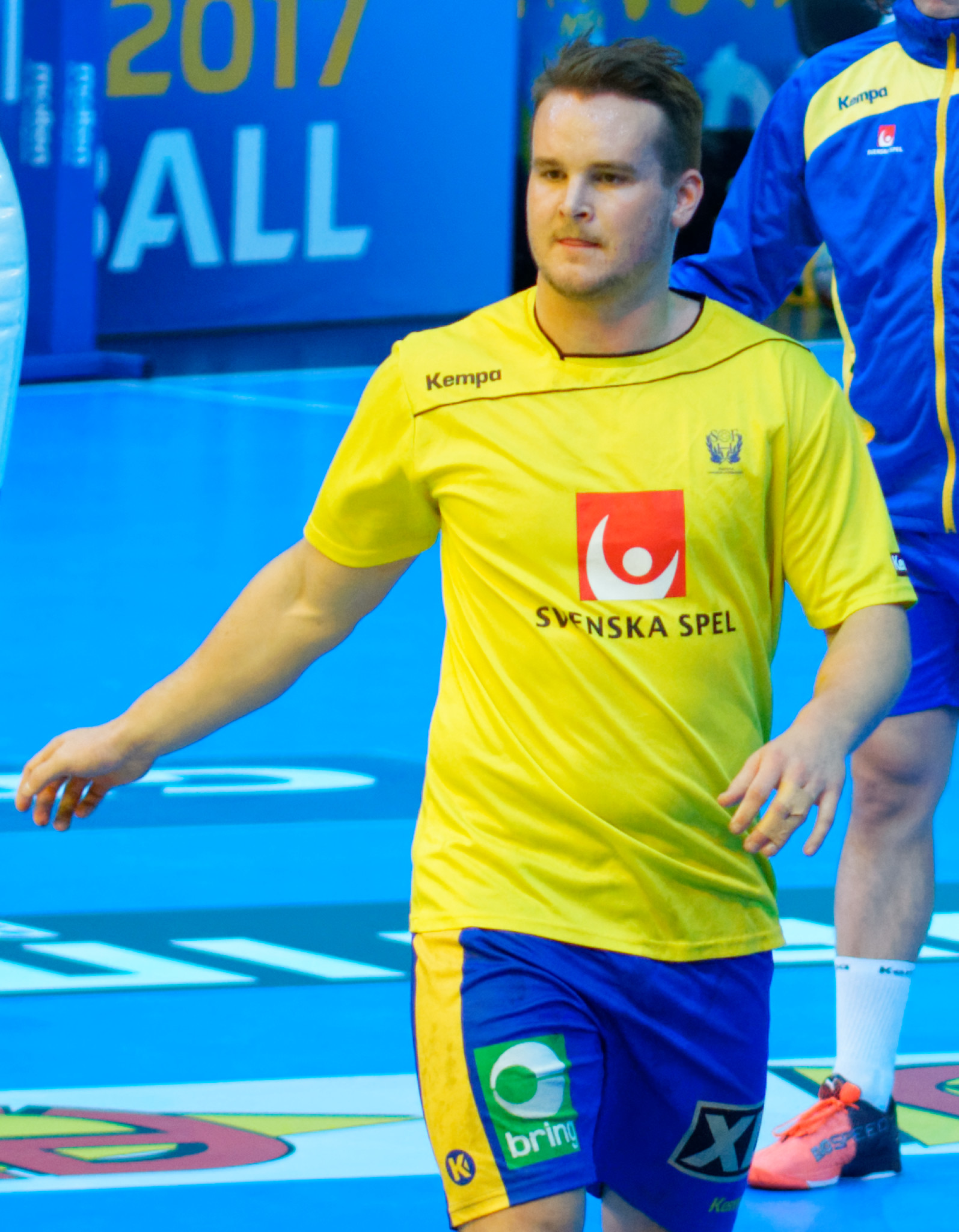

Personal information
- Full name: Jesper Ilmari Korhonen Konradsson
- Nationality: Swedish
- Born: 4 June 1994 (age 32) Gothenburg, Sweden
- Height: 1.84 m (6 ft 0 in)

Sport
- Sport: Handball
- Position: Centre back
- Current club: SønderjyskE
- Number: 6

Youth career
- Years: Team
- –: Kärra HF

Senior clubs
- Years: Team
- –2011: Kärra HF
- 2011–2017: Alingsås HK
- 2017–2022: Skjern Håndbold
- 2022–2025: USAM Nîmes Gard
- 2025–: SønderjyskE
National team
Years	Team	Apps	(Gls)
2014–	Sweden	45	(55)
- Updated on 4 July 2025

Jesper Ilmari Korhonen Konradsson (born 4 June 1994) is a Swedish handball player for SønderjyskE and the Swedish national team.

He competed at the 2016 European Men's Handball Championship. He participated at the 2019 World Men's Handball Championship.
