= Fenix Toulouse Handball =

French handball club

- Full name: Fenix Toulouse Handball
- Short name: Fenix
- Founded: 1964; 62 years ago
- Arena: Palais des sports André-Brouat, Toulouse
- Capacity: 4,397
- League: LNH Division 1
- 2024–25: LNH Division 1, 4th of 16
- Club colours
Home	Away

Fenix Toulouse Handball is a French handball team based in Toulouse, that plays in the LNH Division 1.

Location of Fenix Toulouse Handball

== Crest, colours, supporters ==
=== Naming history ===
Name	Period
Association sportive des établissements aéronautiques de Toulouse	1964–1978
Stade Toulousain	1978–1989
Sporting Toulouse 31	1989–1996
Spacer's de Toulouse Handball	1996–2003
Toulouse Union Handball	2003–2007
Toulouse Handball	2007–2011
Fenix Toulouse Handball	2011–present

=== Kit manufacturers ===
Period	Kit manufacturer
–2020	(Denmark) Hummel
2020–present	(Sweden) Craft

=== Kits ===
HOME
2014–15	Craft; 2020–21	Craft; 2021–22	Craft; 2023–24

AWAY
2014–15	Craft; 2020–21	Craft; 2021–22	Craft; 2023–24

== Sports Hall information ==
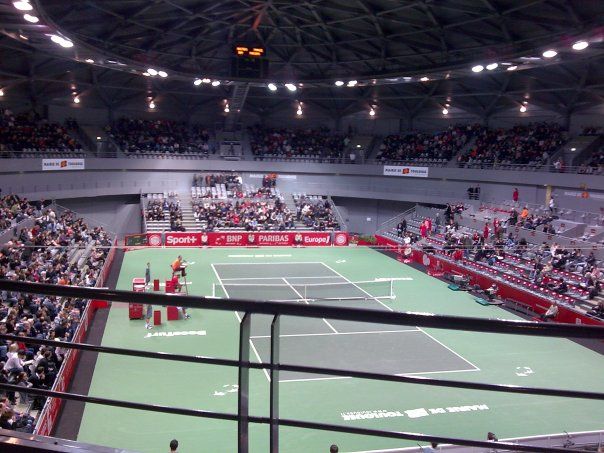
Home hall: Palais des sports André-Brouat

- Name: – Palais des sports André-Brouat
- City: – Toulouse
- Capacity: – 4397
- Address: – 3 Rue Pierre Laplace, 31000 Toulouse, France

== Results ==
- Coupe de France:
  - Winners: 1998
  - Finalists: 1999
- Coupe de la Ligue:
  - Finalists: 2015

== Team ==
=== Current squad ===
Squad for the 2024–25 season

Fenix Toulouse Handball

Goalkeepers

- 1 (Belgium) Jef Lettens
- 12 (Sweden) Simon Möller
- 61 (Tunisia) Yassine Belkaied

Right wingers

- 2 (France) Romain Giraudeau
- 11 (France) Edouard Kempf

Left wingers

- 7 (France) Téo Jarry
- 19 (Serbia) Nemanja Ilić (c)

Line players

- 5 (Democratic Republic of the Congo) Gabriel Nyembo
- 6 (Poland) Antoni Doniecki

Left Backs

- 4 (Chile) Erwin Feuchtmann
- 13 (France) Bakary Diallo
- 23 (Portugal) Gonçalo Vieira

Centre Backs

- 10 (France) Maxime Gilbert
- 14 (Sweden) Casper Käll
- 55 (Spain) Niko Mindegia

Right Backs

- 8 (France) Matthieu Marmier
- 15 (Serbia) Uroš Mitrović
- 17 (Serbia) Uroš Kojadinović

=== Technical staff ===
- Head coach: (Serbia) Danijel Anđelković
- Assistant coach: (France) Rémi Calvel
- Fitness coach: (France) Maxime Altenhoven
- Physiotherapist: (France) Hervé Fournier
- Club doctor: (France) Pierre Sébastien

=== Transfers ===
Transfers for the 2026–27 season

Joining

- (Argentina) Nicolás Bono (CB) from (North Macedonia) RK Vardar
- (France) Mathéo Briffe (LB) from (France) Cesson Rennes MHB
- (France) Andréa Guillaume (RW) from (France) Limoges Handball
- (France) Robin Kerdudo (GK) from (France) Valence Drôme Handball

Leaving

- (Spain) Niko Mindegia (CB) to (Spain) CD Bidasoa
- (Chile) Erwin Feuchtmann (LB) to (Turkey) Beşiktaş JK
- (Sweden) Simon Möller (GK) to (Germany) SG Flensburg-Handewitt
- (France) Édouard Kempf (RW) to (France) C' Chartres MHB

=== Transfer History ===
Transfers for the 2025–26 season

Joining

- (Sweden) Pontus Brolin (LB) from (Sweden) IK Sävehof
- (Slovenia) Enej Slatinek Jovičić (CB) from (Slovenia) RK Gorenje Velenje
- (France) Hugo Jund (LP) from (France) C' Chartres MHB

Leaving

- (Serbia) Uroš Mitrović (RB) to (North Macedonia) RK Vardar
- (Poland) Antoni Doniecki (LP) to (France) US Créteil Handball
- (Sweden) Casper Käll (CB) to (Denmark) GOG Håndbold
- (France) Matthieu Marmier (RB) to (France) US Dunkerque HB

== Previous squads ==
2020–2021 Team
Shirt No	Nationality	Player	Birth Date	Position
1	Belgium	Jef Lettens	12 August 1990 (age 36)	Goalkeeper
2	France	Rémi Leventoux	12 February 1992 (age 34)	Line Player
3	France	Pierrick Chelle	8 December 1989 (age 36)	Right Winger
5	France	Tom Bertini	6 March 1999 (age 27)	Central Back
6	France	Josh Mongin	9 March 1999 (age 27)	Left Winger
7	France	Sadou N'Tanzi	7 January 2000 (age 26)	Central Back
8	France	Matis Gardent	5 May 1999 (age 27)	Line Player
9	Norway	Henrik Jakobsen	16 December 1992 (age 33)	Line Player
10	France	Maxime Gilbert	22 May 1991 (age 35)	Central Back
11	France	Édouard Kempf	20 March 1998 (age 28)	Right Winger
13	SerbiaHungary	Uros Borzas	28 July 1999 (age 27)	Left Back
15	France	Pierre Soudry	27 March 1988 (age 38)	Right Back
16	France	Théo Gehin	14 March 1999 (age 27)	Goalkeeper
19	Serbia	Nemanja Ilić	11 May 1990 (age 36)	Left Winger
21	France	Matthieu Marmier	8 June 2000 (age 26)	Right Back
23	Portugal	Gonçalo Martins Vieira	27 April 1999 (age 27)	Central Back
24	Serbia	Milan Jovanović	24 January 1998 (age 28)	Left Back
33	France	Gaël Tribillon	2 March 1998 (age 28)	Left Winger
34	France	Nori Ben Halima	15 May 1998 (age 28)	Left Back
51	Croatia	Luka Sokolić	15 April 1990 (age 36)	Left Back
67	Algeria	Ayoub Abdi	16 February 1997 (age 29)	Right Back
69	France	Maxime Discamps	3 July 2003 (age 23)	Left Back
89	Brazil	César Almeida	6 January 1989 (age 37)	Goalkeeper
95	Chile	Aaron Codina	19 February 1999 (age 27)	Left Back

2014–2015 Team
Shirt No	Nationality	Player	Birth Date	Position
1	France	Steeven Panchaud	18 May 1995 (age 31)	Goalkeeper
3	France	Pierrick Chelle	8 December 1989 (age 36)	Right Winger
6	France	Clement Perez	24 May 1994 (age 32)	Left Winger
10	France	Maxime Gilbert	22 May 1991 (age 35)	Central Back
11	France	Jérôme Fernandez	7 March 1977 (age 49)	Left Back
12	France	Wesley Pardin	1 January 1990 (age 36)	Goalkeeper
14	France	Jackson Pavade	5 March 1992 (age 34)	Right Winger
15	Serbia	Danijel Anđelković	28 August 1978 (age 48)	Central Back
16	France	Cyril Dumoulin	2 February 1984 (age 42)	Goalkeeper
19	Serbia	Nemanja Ilić	11 May 1990 (age 36)	Left Winger
20	France	Cyril Morency	14 June 1991 (age 35)	Left Back
22	Slovenia	Miha Žvižej	6 November 1987 (age 38)	Line Player
23	France	Clement Lhuillier	9 February 1995 (age 31)	Right Winger
25	France	Rémi Calvel	25 July 1983 (age 43)	Left Back
28	France	Valentin Porte	7 September 1990 (age 36)	Right Back
47	France	Jordan Bonilauri	23 January 1992 (age 34)	Line Player
88	Montenegro	Vladimir Osmajić	17 March 1980 (age 46)	Left Back

== Former club members ==
=== Notable former players ===
- (France) Rémi Calvel (2010–2017)
- (France) Robin Cantegrel (2021–)
- (France) Philippe Debureau (1984–1986)
- (France) Cyril Dumoulin (2014–2016)
- (France) (Democratic Republic of the Congo) Rock Feliho (2012)
- (France) Jérôme Fernandez (1997–1999, 2011–2015)
- (France) Daouda Karaboué (2010–2013)
- (France) Christophe Kempé (1996–1999, 2001–2010)
- (France) Bruno Martini (1997–1998)
- (France) Aymeric Minne (2013–2015)
- (France) Claude Onesta (1968–1987)
- (France) Wesley Pardin (2006–2017)
- (France) Frédéric Perez (1994–1997)
- (France) Stéphane Plantin (1994–2006)
- (France) Yohann Ploquin (1998–2008)
- (France) Valentin Porte (2008–2016)
- (France) (Morocco) Seufyann Sayad (2004–2006)
- (France) Cédric Sorhaindo (2010)
- (Algeria) Ayoub Abdi (2019–2024)
- (Algeria) Abdelkrim Bendjemil (1992–1998)
- (Algeria) Rabah Soudani (2005–2009)
- (Austria) Tobias Wagner (2021–)
- (Belgium) Jef Lettens (2019–)
- (Belarus) Vitali Feshchanka (1999–2000)
- (Brazil) César Almeida (2019–2021)
- (Chile) Erwin Feuchtmann (2021–)
- (Croatia) Luka Sokolić (2020–)
- (Czech Republic) Michal Brůna (2002–2003)
- (Czech Republic) Petr Linhart (2016–2017)
- (Denmark) Kasper Kisum (2017–2018)
- (Democratic Republic of the Congo) Damien Kabengele (2010–2013)
- (Greece) Alexandros Vasilakis (2013)
- (Morocco) Yassine Idrissi (2016–2019)
- (North Macedonia) Goce Georgievski (2015–2016)
- (Montenegro) Vladimir Osmajić (2013–2016)
- (Montenegro) Vasko Ševaljević (2015–2017)
- (Netherlands) Luc Steins (2019–2020)
- (Norway) Alexander Buchmann (2007)
- (Norway) Henrik Jakobsen (2018–2021)
- (Poland) Rafał Przybylski (2017–2019)
- (Romania) Rudi Prisăcaru (1995–2002)
- (Slovenia) Miha Žvižej (2012–2016)
- (Spain) Arnau García (2017–2020)
- (Spain) Ángel Montoro (2013–2014)
- (Spain) Gonzalo Pérez de Vargas (2013–2014)
- (Spain) Salvador Puig (2011–2014)
- (Spain) Álvaro Ruiz Sánchez (2015–2019)
- (Spain) Ferran Solé (2016–2020)
- (Serbia) Danijel Anđelković (2010–2016)
- (Serbia) (Hungary) Uros Borzas (2020–2022)
- (Serbia) Nemanja Ilić (2013–)
- (Serbia) Milan Jovanović (2018–)
- (Serbia) Vladica Stojanović (2010)
- (Sweden) Andreas Cederholm (2016–2017)
- (Sweden) Fredric Pettersson (2016–2018, 2021–2024)
- (Tunisia) Anouar Ayed (2004–2013)
- (Tunisia) Marouen Belhadj (2009–2011)

=== Former coaches ===
Seasons	Coach	Country
1987–2001	Claude Onesta	(France)
2001–2002	Frédéric Perez	(France)
2002–2005	Rudi Prisăcaru	(Romania)
2005–2009	Laurent Bezeau	(France)
2009–2011	Raphaël Geslan	(France)
2011–2014	Joël da Silva	(France)
2014–2015	Toni Garcia	(Spain)
2015–2021	Philippe Gardent	(France)
2021–	Danijel Anđelković	(Serbia)
