= Sorin Toacsen =

Romanian handball player (born 1969)

Personal information
- Full name: Sorin Gabriel Toacsen
- Nationality: Romanian
- Born: 27 February 1969 (age 57) Drobeta-Turnu Severin, Romania

Sport
- Sport: Handball
- Position: Goalkeeper

Youth career
- Years: Team
- –: CSŞ Târgu Jiu

Senior clubs
- Years: Team
- 1986-1995: Universitatea Craiova
- 1995-1996: USAM Nîmes
- 1996-2000: Montpellier Handball
- 2000-2003: USAM Nîmes
- 2003-2004: Montpellier Handball
- 2004-2006: US Dunkerque
- 2006-2007: SC Uztel Ploiești
National team
Years	Team	Apps	(Gls)
–	Romania	243	(7)

Sorin Toacsen (born 27 February 1969) is a Romanian handball player. He competed in the men's tournament at the 1992 Summer Olympics.
