= Palais des Sports (Orléans) =

Indoor sports complex in Orléans, France

Coordinates: 47°54′35″N 1°54′43″E

- Palais des Sports d'Orleans
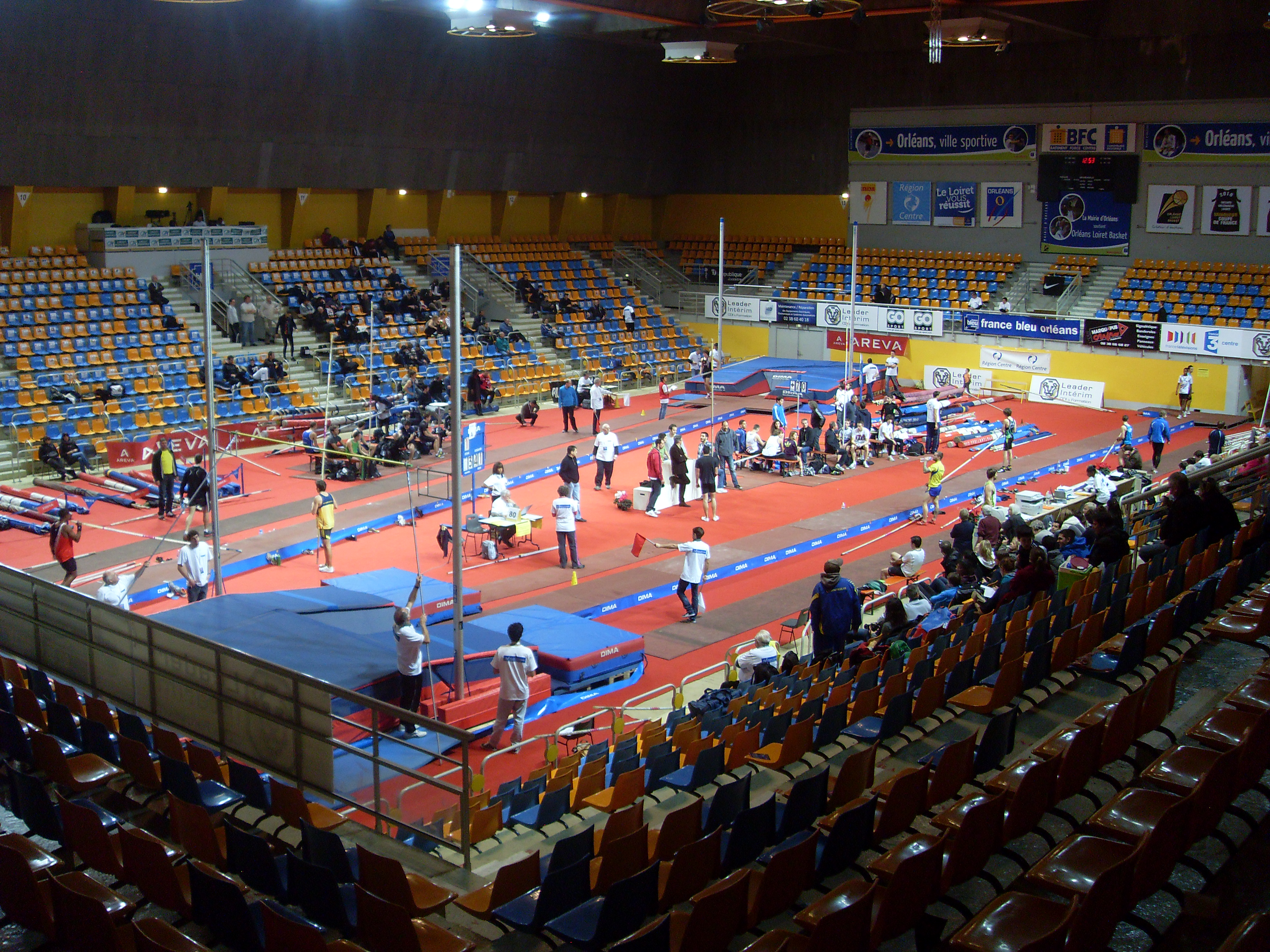
- Interactive map of Palais des Sports
- Location: Orléans, France
- Capacity: 3,222 (Basketball)

Tenants
- Orléans Loiret Basket (LNB Pro A) (1993-2023); Saran Loiret Handball (Proligue) (2023-present)

Palais des Sports (English: Palace of Sports) is an indoor sports complex in the city of Orléans, France. The capacity of the arena is 3,222 people. This is the arena use by the resident club of Saran Loiret Handball.

Until 2023, it was an arena used by the French Pro B League professional basketball team Orléans Loiret Basket. The Palais des Sports, with its smaller capacity, hosts the team's domestic competitions, while EuroLeague and Eurocup matches are held in the larger Zénith d'Orléans. The club now plays at the CO'Met Arena.

In addition to basketball, since 2005, the arena has played host to the Open d'Orléans, a tennis tournament that is part of the ATP Challenger Tour.

From June 16 to 19, 2022, the Palais des Sports welcomes the French women's volleyball team and other teams competing in the final phase of the European Golden League 2022.

Since 2023 and its return to the StarLigue, Saran Loiret Handball has moved to Orléans and plays its home games at the Palais des Sports.
