= Cesson Rennes MHB =

French handball club

- Full name: Cesson Rennes Métropole Handball
- Short name: CRMHB
- Founded: 1968; 58 years ago
- Arena: Glaz Arena, Cesson-Sévigné
- Capacity: 4,500
- League: LNH Division 1
- 2024–25: LNH Division 1, 12th of 16
- Club colours
Home	Away

Cesson Rennes Métropole Handball, is a team handball club from Cesson-Sévigné, France. The club was formed in 1968 being called OC Cesson. In 2011 a new club was created with a new name.

Location of Cesson Rennes MHB

== Crest, colours, supporters ==
=== Naming history ===
Name	Period
Olympique Club Cessonnais	1968–2011
Cesson Rennes Métropole Handball	2011–present

=== Kits ===
HOME
2017–18	2020-21	2021-22	2023-24

AWAY
2014–15	2017–18	2018–19	2020-21	2021-22	2023-24

== Sports Hall information ==
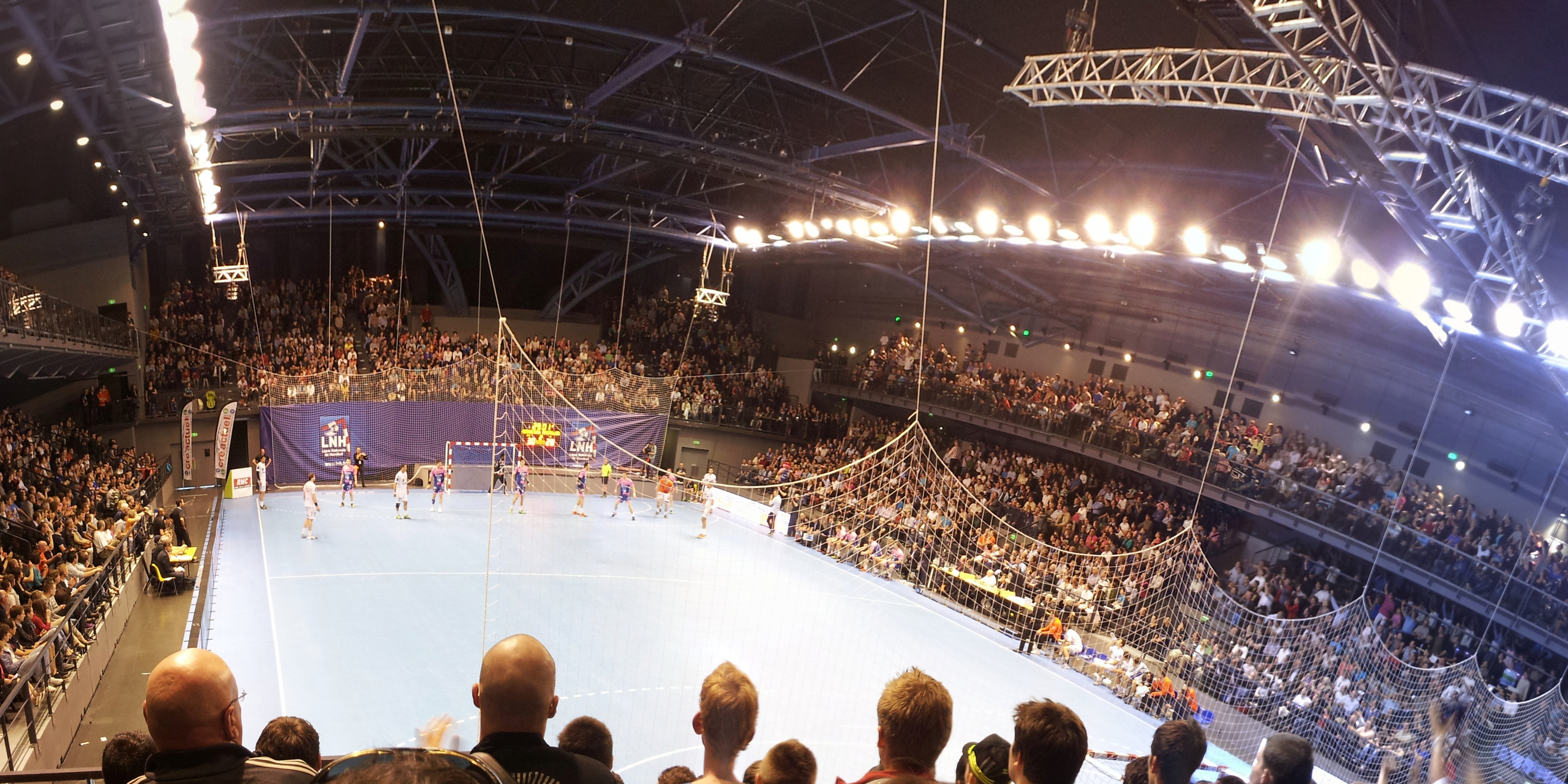
Home hall: Glaz Arena

- Name: – Glaz Arena
- City: – Cesson-Sévigné
- Capacity: – 4500
- Address: – Chemin du Bois de la Justice, 35510 Cesson-Sévigné, France

== Team ==
=== Current squad ===
Squad for the 2022–23 season

Cesson Rennes MHB

Goalkeepers

- 1 (France) Arnaud Tabarand
- 12 (Portugal) Miguel Espinha Ferreira

Right wingers

- 9 (France) Théophile Caussé
- 29 (France) Youenn Cardinal

Left wingers

- 11 (France) Sylvain Hochet (c)
- 23 (France) Junior Tuzolana

Line players

- 17 (Portugal) Tiago Rocha
- 22 (France) (Italy) Axel Oppedisano
- 56 (France) Romaric Guillo

Left Backs

- 14 (France) Mathéo Briffe
- 15 (France) Robin Molinié
- 54 (France) Ludwig Appolinaire
- 64 (Denmark) Rune Schrøder

Centre Backs

- 10 (France) Corentin Lorvellec
- 13 (France) Romain Briffe

Right Backs

- 3 (France) Florian Delecroix
- 4 (Spain) Javier Borrogan

=== Technical staff ===
- Head coach: (France) Sébastien Leriche
- Assistant coach: (France) Yann Lemaire
- Physiotherapist: (France) Thibaut Minel
- Club doctor: (France) Thierry Le Bars

=== Transfers ===
Transfers for the 2026–27 season

Joining

- (Belarus) Andrei Klimavets (LB) from (Austria) HC Linz AG

Leaving

- (France) Mathéo Briffe (LB) to (France) Fenix Toulouse Handball

=== Transfer History ===
Transfers for the 2025–26 season

Joining

- (Brazil) Gustavo Rodrigues (RB) from (France) Chambéry SMBH
- (Spain) Josep Folqués Ortiz (LW) from (France) Istres Provence Handball
- (Spain) Asier Nieto Marcos (LB) from (Spain) Bidasoa Irún
- (Hungary) Egon Hanusz (CB) from (Portugal) S.L. Benfica
- (Hungary) Erik Szeitl (LP) from (France) Csurgói KK
- (Belgium) Simon Ooms (LP) from (Denmark) TMS Ringsted
- (France) Alex Moran (RW) from (France) Pontault-Combault Handball
- (France) Jean-Emmanuel Kouassi (GK) from (France) Caen Handball

Leaving

- (Israel) Daniel Mosindi (RB) to (Hungary) MOL Tatabánya KC
- (Bosnia and Herzegovina) Milos Mocevic (GK) to (France) Caen Handball
- (Italy) (France) Axel Oppedisano (LP) to (France) JS Cherbourg
- (France) Youenn Cardinal (RW) to (France) C' Chartres MHB
- (France) Ludwig Appolinaire (CB) to (France) US Dunkerque HB
- (France) Robin Molinié (LB) to (France) Pays d'Aix Université Club

== Former club members ==
=== Notable former players ===
- (France) Jean-Jacques Acquevillo (2018–2019)
- (France) Igor Anić (2012-2014, 2019-2021)
- (France) (Democratic Republic of the Congo) Frédéric Beauregard (2017–2019)
- (France) Robin Cantegrel (2019-2020)
- (France) Yann Genty (2012-2014)
- (France) Sylvain Hochet (2009-2024)
- (France) Hugo Kamtchop-Baril (2014-2022)
- (France) Nicolas Lemonne (2009-2013)
- (France) Mickaël Robin (2014-2016)
- (Algeria) El Hadi Biloum (2009-2012)
- (Algeria) Sassi Boultif (2012-2013)
- (Belgium) Thomas Bolaers (2017-2020)
- (Belgium) Bram Dewit (2007-2010)
- (Belgium) Jef Lettens (2016–2019)
- (Belgium) Simon Ooms (2017-2018)
- (Belgium) Arber Qerimi (2017-2018)
- (Bosnia and Herzegovina) Duško Čelica (2013-2014)
- (Canada) Alexis Bertrand (2005–2007, 2008-2010)
- (Hungary) Rudolf Faluvégi (2019, 2021-)
- (Hungary) István Rédei (2014-2015)
- (Iran) Sajjad Esteki (2019-2021)
- (Iceland) Guðmundur Hólmar Helgason (2016-2018)
- (Italy) (Croatia) Michele Skatar (2014-2016)
- (Japan) Adam Yuki Baig (2017-2019)
- (Moldova) Ghennadii Solomon (2006-2007)
- (Poland) Michał Szyba (2018-2019)
- (Portugal) Wilson Davyes (2015-2017)
- (Portugal) Miguel Espinha Ferreira (2021-)
- (Slovenia) Rok Zaponsek (2020-2021)
- (Tunisia) Wael Horri (2010-2012)

=== Former coaches ===
Seasons	Coach	Country
2014–2018	Yérime Sylla	(France)
2018–2019	Christian Gaudin	(France)
2019–	Sébastien Leriche	(France)
