= Gonçalo Ribeiro (handballer) =

Portuguese handball player (born 1997)

Personal information
- Nationality: Portuguese
- Born: 22 February 1997 (age 29) Lisbon, Portugal
- Height: 1.90 m (6 ft 3 in)

Sport
- Sport: Handball
- Position: Centre Back
- Current club: Al Arabi
- Number: 33

Senior clubs
- Years: Team
- –2017: (Portugal) S.L. Benfica
- 2017–2018: (France) Pontault-Combault Handball
- 2018–2019: (North Macedonia) RK Metalurg Skopje
- 2019–2020: (Austria) Union JURI Leoben
- 2020: (Spain) Liberbank Cantabria Sinfín
- 2020–2022: (Germany) EHV Aue
- 2022–2024: (Spain) Ángel Ximénez Puente Genil
- 2024–: (Qatar) Al Arabi

Gonçalo Ribeiro (born 22 February 1997) is a Portuguese handball player who plays for Al Arabi.
