= Miha Žvižej =

Slovenian handball player

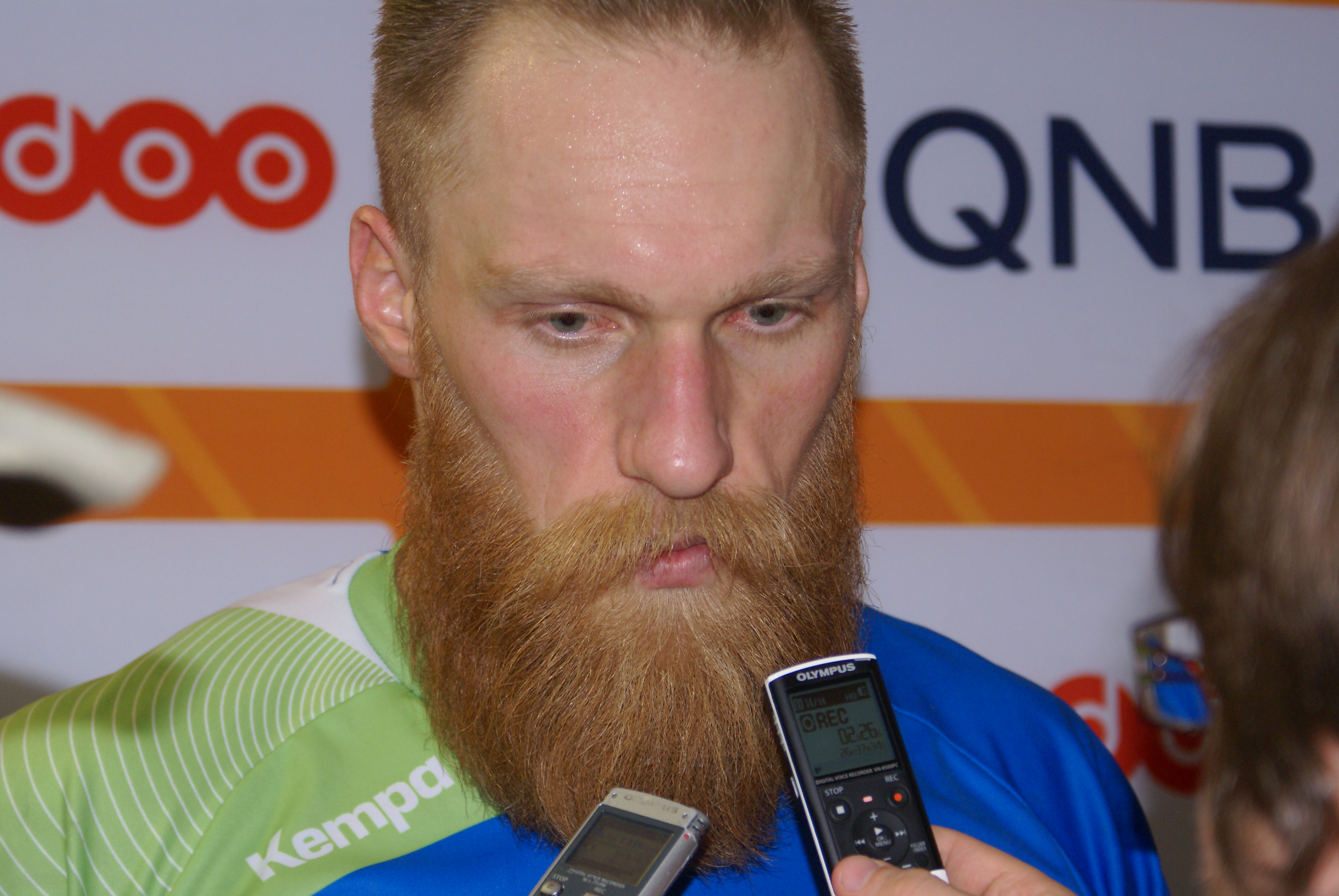

Personal information
- Nationality: Slovenian
- Born: 6 November 1987 (age 38) Celje, SFR Yugoslavia
- Height: 1.93 m (6 ft 4 in)

Sport
- Sport: Handball
- Position: Pivot
- Current club: TTH Holstebro
- Number: 23

Senior clubs
- Years: Team
- –2010: RK Gorenje Velenje
- 2010–2012: Bjerringbro-Silkeborg
- 2012–2016: Fenix Toulouse
- 2016–2017: Montpellier Handball
- 2017–2022: Ribe-Esbjerg HH
- 2022–: TTH Holstebro
National team
Years	Team	Apps	(Gls)
2010-	Slovenia	102	(222)

Miha Žvižej (born 6 November 1987) is a professional handball player from Slovenia. He is currently playing in Denmark for TTH Holstebro.

Recently, he represented Slovenia at the 2015 World Men's Handball Championship. Before that, he played at the 2010 European Men's Handball Championship.

His brother Luka Žvižej is also a professional handball player.
