= Axel Sjöblad =

Swedish handball player (born 1967)

Personal information
- Full name: Axel Erland Sjöblad
- Nationality: Sweden
- Born: 3 November 1967 (age 58) Malmö, Sweden
- Height: 196 cm (77 in)

Sport
- Sport: Handball
- Position: Pivot

Youth career
- Years: Team
- –: Lugi HF

Senior clubs
- Years: Team
- 1985-1992: Lugi HF
- 1992-1993: UMS Pontault-Combault HB
- 1993-??: Stavstens IF
National team
Years	Team	Apps	(Gls)
1988-1993	Sweden	75	(83)
Medal record
Men's Handball
Silver medal – second place	1992 Barcelona	Team
World Championship
Gold medal – first place	1990 Czechoslovakia

Axel Erland Sjöblad (born 3 November 1967) is a Swedish former handball player who won the 1990. He also competed in the 1992 Summer Olympics in Barcelona where Sweden won silver medals. He was primarily a defensive player.

He began his career at Lugi in 1985 and played there until 1992. He then joined the French team UMS Pontault-Combault HB.

In 1990, he was a member of the Swedish handball team that won the silver medal. He played in all seven matches and scored five goals.
