= Pays d'Aix Université Club =

French handball club

PAUC Handball
- Full name: Pays d'Aix Université Club Handball
- Short name: PAUC
- Founded: 1955
- Arena: Arena du Pays d'Aix
- Capacity: 6,000
- President: Christian Salomez
- Head coach: Benjamin Pavoni
- League: LNH Division 1
- 2024–25: LNH Division 1, 7th of 16
- Club colours
Home	Away

Location of Pays d'Aix Université Club

Pays d'Aix Université Club Handball is a handball club from Aix-en-Provence, France. Currently, Pays d'Aix Université Club Handball competes in the French First League of Handball.

== History ==
Founded in 1955, the club has played in the French First League of Handball since 2012-13. Just after promotion the signed the French handball star brothers Luka and Nikola Karabatić following a match-fixing scandal involving the players.

In 2017 they moved into the recently built Arena du Pays d'Aix.

== Crest, colours, supporters ==
=== Naming history ===
Name	Period
Aix Université Club	1955–2004
Pays d'Aix Université Club	2004–present

=== Kit manufacturers ===
Period	Kit manufacturer
2012	(United States) Nike
2012 - present	(Germany) Kempa

=== Kits ===
HOME
2009-10	2010-11	2020-21	2021-22	Select; 2023–24

AWAY
2011-12	2013–14	2020-21	2021-22	Select; 2023–24

== Team ==
=== Current squad ===
Squad for the 2024–25 season

Goalkeepers

- 1 (Slovenia) Jože Baznik
- 12 (Sweden) Gustaf Banke

Wingers
LW

- 3 (Spain) Adrian Casqueiro
- 4 (France) Matthieu Ong

RW

- 8 (France) Gabriel Loesch
- 17 (France) Antoine Tissot

Line players

- 15 (France) Hugo Brouzet
- 32 (Italy) Andrea Parisini
- 34 (France) Paul Louis Guiraudou

Back players
LB

- 11 (Sweden) Adam Lönn
- 13 (France) Rohnan Conte-Prat

CB

- 28 (Spain) Ian Tarrafeta
- 10 (France) Eliott Desblancs

RB

- 22 (France) Louis Despreaux
- 33 (France) Alexandre Tritta

=== Transfers ===
Transfers for the 2026–27 season

Joining

- (Norway) Magnus Søndenå (RB) from (Norway) Kolstad Håndball
- (Serbia) Vanja Ilić (LW) from (France) C' Chartres MHB
- (Hungary) Ádám Nagy (RB) from (Hungary) HE-DO B. Braun Gyöngyös

Leaving

- (Spain) Adrián Casqueiro (LW) to (Spain) CB Ademar León
- (France) Aymeric Zaepfel (LB) to (Germany) Füchse Berlin
- (France) Matthieu Ong (LW) to (France) Istres Provence Handball
- (France) Louis Despreaux (RB) to (France) Istres Provence Handball

=== Transfer History ===
Transfers for the 2025–26 season

Joining

- (Georgia (country)) Nikoloz Kalandadze (LB) from (France) Chambéry SMBH
- (Denmark) Sasser Sonn (LP) from (Sweden) IFK Kristianstad
- (France) Aymeric Zaepfel (LB) from (France) US Ivry Handball
- (France) Lucas De la Bretèche (CB) from (France) HBC Nantes
- (France) Robin Molinié (LB) from (France) Cesson Rennes MHB

Leaving

- (Spain) Ian Tarrafeta (CB) to (France) HBC Nantes
- (Sweden) Adam Lönn (LB) to (Germany) SC DHfK Leipzig
- (Italy) Andrea Parisini (LP) to (France) Limoges Handball

== Former club members ==
=== Notable former players ===
- (France) William Accambray (2020–2023)
- (France) Baptiste Bonnefond (2019–2021)
- (France) Nicolas Claire (2019–2023)
- (France) Théo Derot (2017–2019)
- (France) Jérôme Fernandez (2015–2017)
- (France) Samuel Honrubia (2019–2021)
- (France) Philippe Julia (1998–2005)
- (France) Luka Karabatic (2012–2015)
- (France) Nikola Karabatić (2013)
- (France) Romain Lagarde (2021–2025)
- (France) Yanis Lenne (2018-2019)
- (France) Aymeric Minne (2015–2019)
- (France) Wesley Pardin (2017–2024)
- (France) Yohann Ploquin (2013-2015)
- (France) Luc Tobie (2012–2016)
- (Algeria) Ayoub Abdi (2016–2017)
- (Algeria) (France) Micke Brasseleur (2021–2022)
- (Algeria) Abdérazak Hamad (2009–2012)
- (Algeria) Tahar Labane (2008–2010)
- (Algeria) Sid Ali Yahia (2009–2012)
- (Austria) Thomas Bauer (2016-2017)
- (Croatia) Robert Markotić (2014–2015)
- (Croatia) Mirza Šarić (2009-2011)
- (Czech Republic) Michal Kasal (2016)
- (Egypt) Mohamed Mamdouh (2016–2017)
- (Egypt) Ali Zein (2016–2018)
- (Spain) Juan Andreu (2015–2019)
- (Spain) Imanol Garciandia (2020–2021)
- (Spain) Iosu Goñi Leoz (2013–2020)
- (Spain) Isaías Guardiola (2015–2016)
- (Spain) Iñaki Peciña (2017–2022)
- (Spain) Joan Saubich (2015–2016)
- (Spain) Ian Tarrafeta (2020-)
- (Greece) Alexandros Vasilakis (2013–2014)
- (Iceland) Kristján Örn Kristjánsson (2020–2024)
- (Lithuania) Gerdas Babarskas (2022-2024)
- (Norway) Ole Erevik (2015–2017)
- (Slovenia) Dean Bombač (2014)
- (Slovenia) Klemen Cehte (2014–2015)
- (Slovenia) Darko Cingesar (2017–2020)
- (Slovenia) Vid Kavtičnik (2019–2020)
- (Slovenia) Borut Oslak (2011–2013)
- (Serbia) Vladica Stojanović (2012–2016)
- (Sweden) Philip Stenmalm (2018–2019)
- (Ukraine) Sergiy Onufriyenko (2016–2018)

=== Former coaches ===
Seasons	Coach	Country
2005–2008	Philippe Julia	(France)
2008–2010	Didier de Samie	(France)
2010–2014	Jérémy Roussel	(France)
2014–2015	Zvonimir Serdarušić	(Croatia)
2015	Marc Wiltberger	(France)
2015–2016	Didier de Samie	(France)
2016–2020	Jérôme Fernandez	(France)
2020–2023	Thierry Anti	(France)
2023–	Benjamin Pavoni	(France)
