= Pontault-Combault Handball =

French handball club

- Short name: PCHB
- Founded: 1967; 59 years ago
- Arena: Espace Boisramé
- Capacity: 1,300
- League: LNH Division 2
- Club colours
Home	Away

Pontault-Combault Handball, previously known as UMS Pontault-Combault HB is a French handball team based in Pontault-Combault in the suburbs of Paris and founded in 1967. Since 1992, the club has alternated between the French Division 2 and Division 1 championships, which it found for only one season in 2018–2019.

Location of Pontault-Combault Handball

== History ==
Born in 1967, the Etoile Sportive de Pontault-Combault took off through the Regional Championship. Having become Union municipale sports de Pontault-Combault Handball Club and then trained by Thierry Anti, the club won the French championship in the 3rd division in 1992 and then in the 2nd division in 1994. The club then evolves for 7 seasons in the elite with the culmination of a fourth place in 1999 before being relegated in 2001. The club then oscillates several seasons between D1 and D2 before being permanently relegated in 2008. In 2018, the club, now called Pontault-Combault Handball, won the Division 2 Accession Barrages: author of 4 draws in as many games, the club was thus promoted to Division 1 without having won a match.

== Crest, colours, supporters ==
=== Naming history ===
Name	Period
Étoile sportive de Pontault-Combault	1967–1974
Union municipale sports de Pontault-Combault Handball Club	1974–2018
Pontault-Combault Handball	2018–present

=== Kits ===
HOME
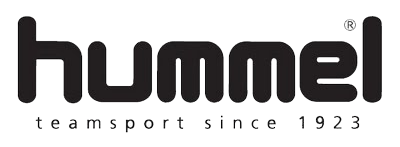
2020–

AWAY
2018–19	2020–

== Team ==
=== Current squad ===
Squad for the 2021–22 season

Pontault-Combault Handball

Goalkeepers

- 12 (Croatia) Sven Horvat
- 24 (Gabon) Rémy Gervelas
- 90 (France) Léo Canton-Lauga

Left Wingers

- 17 (France) Damien Gineys
- 68 (Algeria) Walid Badi
- 99 (France) / (Brazil) Jean-Pierre Dupoux (c)

Right Wingers

- 11 (France) Alexis Lemal
- 20 (France) Alex Moran

Line players

- 10 (France) Ognjen Djeric
- 18 (Tunisia) Ryadh Souid
- 42 (France) Adrien Chaudanson
- 77 (France) Younés Ouzrour

Central Backs

- 3 (France) Pierre Guillaumat
- 4 (Portugal) Hugo Lima
- 6 (France) Nicolas Schneider
- 9 (Ukraine) Dmytro Gunko
- 14 (France) Thibault Garaudet

Left Backs

- 15 (Brazil) Da Silva Uelington Ferreira
- 26 (Belgium) Sébastien Danesi

Right Backs

- 7 (France) Lilian Pasquet
- 19 (Democratic Republic of the Congo) (France) Genèse Bouity

=== Technical staff ===
- Head coach: (France) Chérif Hamani
- Assistant coach: (France) Didier Ruffe
- Goalkeeping coach: (France) Damien Pellier
- Fitness coach: (France) Mario Danial
- Physiotherapist: (France) Ludivine Misselyn
- Physiotherapist: (France) Julie Mandelli
- Club doctor: (France) Patrick Sportouch

=== Transfers ===
Transfers for the 2026–27 season

Joining

- (United States) (Hungary) Pál Merkovszki (GK) from (Germany) OHV Aurich
- (Italy) (France) Jérémi Pirani (LW) from (France) Tremblay Handball
- (France) Loick Spady (GK) from (France) Angers SCO Handball
- (France) Erwan Modeste (LP) from (France) Union sportive de Saintes Handball
- (France) Noah Lenclume (LB) from (France) Union sportive de Saintes Handball

Leaving

- (France) Thomas Toupance (LB) to (France) Istres Provence Handball
- (France) Joris Labro (GK) to (France) Pau Billère Handball
- (France) Nael Tighiouart (LW) loan back to (France) C' Chartres MHB

=== Transfer History ===
Transfers for the 2025–26 season

Joining

- (Algeria) (France) Elyas Bouadjadja (RB) from (France) Massy Essonne Handball
- (France) Enzo Gesland (RW) from (France) JS Cherbourg
- (France) Baptiste Joblon (LP) from (France) Nancy Handball
- (France) Louis Messager (LB) from (France) Nancy Handball
- (France) Nael Tighiouart (LW) on loan from (France) C' Chartres MHB

Leaving

- (Guinea) (France) Lilian Pasquet (RB) to (Spain) Club Balonmano Nava
- (Democratic Republic of the Congo) (France) Genèse Bouity (RB) to (France) Villemomble Handball
- (France) Alex Moran (RW) to (France) Cesson Rennes MHB
- (France) Aurélien Padolus (LB) to (France) Istres Provence Handball
- (France) Julien Luciani (LP) to (France) C' Chartres MHB
- (France) Elio Zammit (LW) to (France) Chambéry SMBH

== Former club members ==
=== Notable former players ===
- (France) Johan Boisedu (2000–2001)
- (France) Robin Cantegrel (2017–2019)
- (France) Francis Franck (1995–1996)
- (France) Thibaut Karsenty (2002–2006)
- (France) Frédéric Louis (1992–1995)
- (France) Mohamadi Loutoufi (2001–2005)
- (France) Stéphane Moualek (2003–2004)
- (France) Alix Kévynn Nyokas (2004–2006)
- (France) Olivier Nyokas (2004–2006)
- (France) Thierry Perreux (1996–1998)
- (France) Yérime Sylla (2001–2004)
- (Algeria) Walid Badi (2021–)
- (Algeria) Hichem Kaabeche (2018–2019)
- (Argentina) Gonzalo Carró (2019–2020)
- (Croatia) Luka Sokolić (2016–2020)
- (Democratic Republic of the Congo) Aurélien Tchitombi (2013–2018)
- (Portugal) Gonçalo Ribeiro (2017-2018)
- (Romania) Ion Mocanu (1995–2002)
- (Romania) Cristian Zaharia (1993–1996)
- (Serbia) Dragan Mladenović (2004–2006)
- (Sweden) Axel Sjöblad (1992–1993)

=== Former coaches ===
Seasons	Coach	Country
1990–1994	Thierry Anti	(France)
1994–1996	Philippe Carrara	(France)
1996–2000	Philippe Germain	(France)
2000	Philippe Desrose	(France)
2000	Emmanuel Remai	(France)
2000–2007	Philippe Carrara	(France)
2007–2008	David Peneau	(France)
2008–2009	Benjamin Pavoni	(France)
2009–2010	Brahim Ighirri	(France)
2010–2014	William Holder	(France)
2014–2018	Sébastien Quintallet	(France)
2018–	Chérif Hamani	(France)
