= Alex Dujshebaev =

Spanish handball player (born 1992)

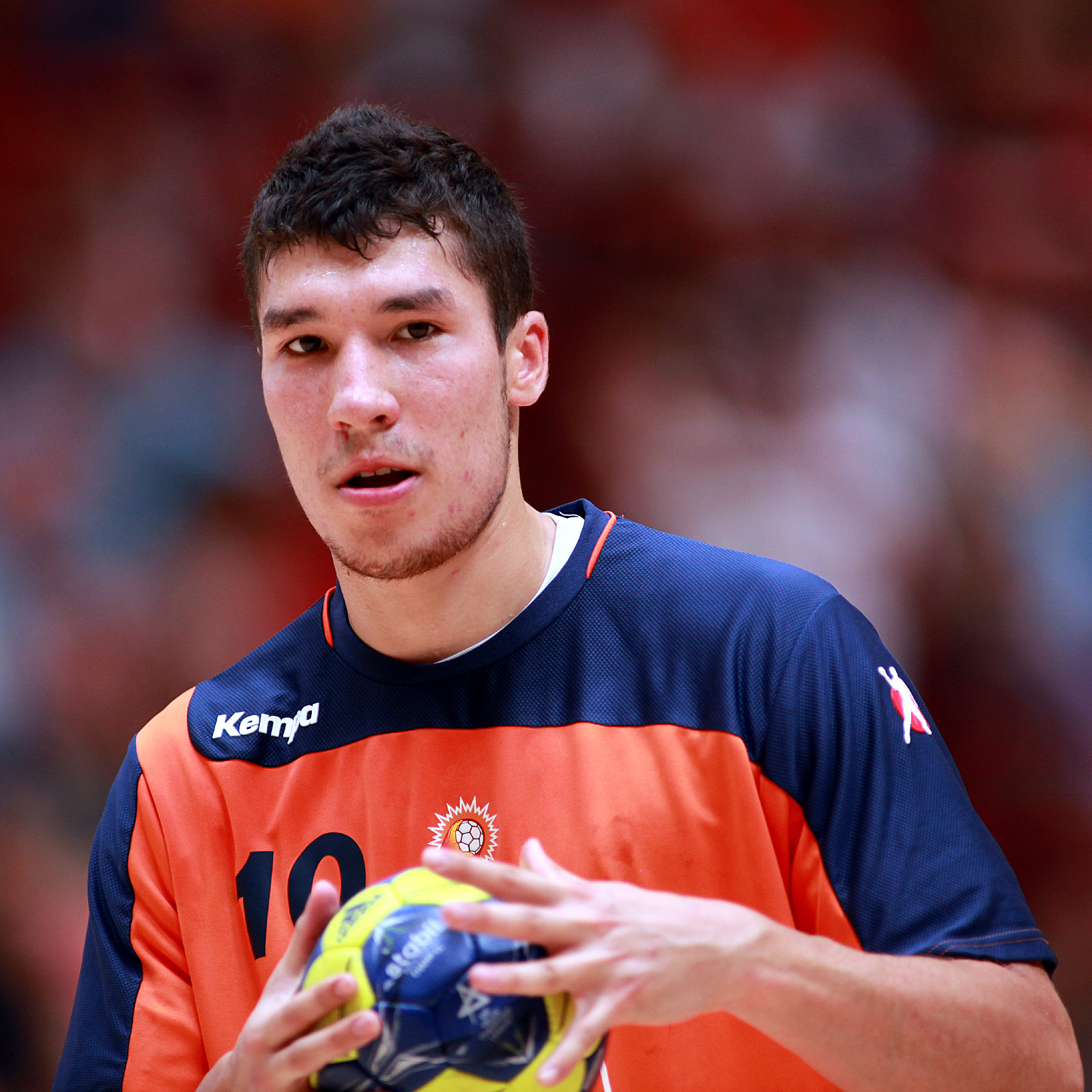
- Dujshebaev in 2012

Personal information
- Full name: Alex Dujshebaev Dobichebaeva
- Nationality: Spanish; Kyrgyz
- Born: 17 December 1992 (age 33) Santander, Spain
- Height: 1.87 m (6 ft 2 in)

Sport
- Sport: Handball
- Position: Right back
- Current club: Industria Kielce
- Number: 10

Senior clubs
- Years: Team
- 2009–2010: BM Ciudad Real
- 2010–2012: La Rioja
- 2012–2013: BM Aragón
- 2013–2017: RK Vardar
- 2017–2026: Industria Kielce
- 2026–: VfL Gummersbach
National team
| Years | Team | Apps | (Gls) |
| 2014– | Spain | 172 | (498) |
Medal record
Olympic Games
| Bronze medal – third place | 2020 Tokyo | Team |
| Bronze medal – third place | 2024 Paris | Team |
World Championship
| Bronze medal – third place | 2021 Egypt |
| Bronze medal – third place | 2023 Poland/Sweden |
European Championship
| Gold medal – first place | 2018 Croatia |
| Gold medal – first place | 2020 Sweden/Austria/Norway |
| Silver medal – second place | 2016 Poland |
- Updated on 27 January 2025

Alex Dujshebaev Dobichebaeva (Kyrgyz: Алекс Талантович Дүйшөбаев; latin: Alex Talantovič Dujshebaev; born 17 December 1992) is a Spanish handball player for Industria Kielce and the Spanish national team.

His mother is of Russian descent, and his father, Talant Dujshebaev who is a former handball player and current coach, is of Kyrgyz descent. His brother Daniel Dujshebaev is also a handball player.

== Career ==
Dujshebaev began his career at BM Ciudad Real, where he became a part of the first team in the 2009-10 season. Back then he played mainly as a right wing player. At the end of the season he joined CB Ciudad de Logroño, where he played for 2 years. He then joined BM Aragón, where he played for 1 season. Here he transitioned to being a right back.

In 2013 he signed a contract Atlético Madrid, but since the club had to withdraw due to financial reasons, the deal fell through. Instead he moved away from Spain to join Macedonian side RK Vardar Skopje. Here he won the Macedonian cup 4 times in row from 2014 to 2017, the Macedonian league in 2015, 2016 and 2017 and the 2017 EHF Champions League.

In the summer of 2017 he joined Polish team Industria Kielce. Here he won the Polish championship every year from 2018 to 2023 and the Polish cup in 2018, 2019 and 2021. In 2022 he reached the EHF Champions League final with the club, but lost to FC Barcelona on penalties. Alex Dujshebaev was the only player to miss his penalty.

=== National team ===
Alex Dujshebaev debuted for the Spanish national team on January 3rd 2014.

He was part of the extended squad for the 2014 European Championship, but could not participate due to a hand injury. He was replaced by Eduardo Gurbindo. His first major international tournament was thus the 2015 World Men's Handball Championship.

He won the 2018 and 2020 European Championships with the Spanish team.

At the 2023 World Championship he won bronze medals and was selected for the all-star team of the tournament.

== Honours ==
RK Vardar

- EHF Champions League: 2017
- Macedonian Championship: 2015, 2016, 2017
- Macedonian Cup: 2014, 2015, 2016, 2017
- Liga SEHA: 2014, 2017

Vive Kielce

- Polish Championship: 2018, 2019, 2020, 2021, 2022, 2023, 2026
- Polish Cup: 2018, 2019, 2021, 2025

== Individual awards ==
- All-Star Right back of the World Championship: 2023
