= 2023–24 Superliga (men's handball) =

Polish Superliga
- Season: 2023–24
- Dates: 30 August 2023 – 25/26 May 2024
- Champions: Orlen Wisła Płock
- Matches: 182
- Goals: 10,525 (57.83 per match)

The 2023–24 Superliga was the 68th season of the Polish Superliga, the top men's handball league in Poland. A total of fourteen teams contested this season's league, which will begin in 30 August 2023 and will conclude in 25 or 26 May 2024.

Barlinek Industria Kielce is the defending champion.

== Format ==
The competition format for the 2023–24 season returns to the format last used in 2018–19 season. It consists of 14 teams each playing a total of 26 matches, half at home and half away. Then the first eight teams from the standings will be playing in the play-off, while the last six teams will be playing in the relegation round. The winner of the play-offs will earn the Polish Championship. The last placed team of the relegation round is directly relegated to the 1st league, and the penultimate team play relegation playoffs with the willing team from the Central League.

== Teams ==
Location of the 2023–24 Superliga teams.
- The following teams compete in the Superliga during the 2023–24 season:

	Team	Arena	Capacity
1	Industria Kielce	Hala Legionów	4,200
2	Orlen Wisła Płock	Orlen Arena	5,492
3	Górnik Zabrze	HWS Pogoń	1,013
4	Chrobry Głogów	HWS Głogów	2,500
5	Torus Wybrzeże Gdańsk	HWS AWFiS Gdańsk	1,700
6	Azoty Puławy	Hala MOSiR Puławy	3,362
7	Grupa Azoty Unia Tarnów	Arena Jaskółka Tarnów	4,317
8	MMTS Kwidzyn	KWS KCSiR	1,504
9	Arged Rebud KPR Ostrovia	Arena Ostrów	2,500
10	Gwardia Opole	Stegu Arena	3,378
11	Piotrkowianin Piotrków Trybunalski	Hala Relax	1,000
12	Energa MKS Kalisz	Arena Kalisz	3,164
13	MKS Zagłębie Lubin	HWS RCS Lubin	3,714
CL	Zepter KPR Legionowo	Arena Legionowo	1,998

== Regular season ==
=== Standings ===
Pos	Team	Pld	W	OTW	OTL	L	GF	GA	GD	Pts	Qualification or relegation
1	Barlinek Industria Kielce	26	25	0	0	1	1004	683	+321	75	Quarterfinals
2	Orlen Wisła Płock	26	25	0	0	1	873	576	+297	75	Quarterfinals
3	Górnik Zabrze	26	17	3	0	6	780	694	+86	57	Quarterfinals
4	Chrobry Głogów	26	17	0	0	9	741	746	−5	51	Quarterfinals
5	Azoty Puławy	26	14	0	2	10	821	788	+33	44	Quarterfinals
6	Energa MKS Kalisz	26	11	2	1	12	668	717	−49	38	Quarterfinals
7	Arged Rebud KPR Ostrovia Ostrów Wielkopolski	26	11	1	1	13	724	781	−57	36	Quarterfinals
8	MMTS Kwidzyn	26	9	1	3	13	721	771	−50	32	Quarterfinals
9	Gwardia Opole	26	7	3	2	14	696	753	−57	29	Relegation round
10	Grupa Azoty Unia Tarnów	26	8	1	1	16	674	787	−113	27	Relegation round
11	Piotrkowianin Piotrków Trybunalski	26	8	1	0	17	694	811	−117	26	Relegation round
12	Zagłębie Lubin	26	6	2	1	17	681	793	−112	23	Relegation round
13	Torus Wybrzeże Gdańsk	26	6	0	2	18	753	804	−51	20	Relegation round
14	Zepter KPR Legionowo	26	4	0	1	21	695	821	−126	13	Relegation round

Updated to match(es) played on 1 April 2024. Source: Orlen Superliga

=== Results ===
Home \ Away	PUL	KIE	GLO	KAL	ZAB	TAR	OPO	KWI	LEG	PLO	OST	PIO	GDA	LUB
Azoty Puławy		28–39	27–28	28–24	31–40	28–22	31–34	37–25	38–28	26–30	30–28	35–30	35–32	36–24
Barlinek Industria Kielce	39–23		44–24	40–29	41–23	45–24	37–24	40–25	39–32	28–29	37–23	41–27	34–30	47–26
Chrobry Głogów	26–31	28–38		28–17	29–33	30–29	26–25	27–26	31–23	25–37	36–31	35–31	34–27	28–23
Energa MKS Kalisz	33–31	21–38	24–28		32–27	28–22	29–28	22–27	30–28	19–32	28–22	30–27	26–24	30–28
Górnik Zabrze	34–29	32–36	39–26	26–21		26–19	29–19	27–24	33–22	22–24	30–26	26–25	31–26	31–29
Grupa Azoty Unia Tarnów	21–37	26–39	27–32	25–24	21–37		29–26	34–26	32–29	26–35	25–28	32–24	29–33	26–34
Gwardia Opole	35–33	24–40	24–22	25–19	28–30	30–26		30–29	27–20	25–30	26–27	32–30	29–33	27–29
MMTS Kwidzyn	29–31	29–48	30–25	22–26	33–35	25–27	33–25		35–26	15–34	37–36	29–31	33–30	26–25
Zepter KPR Legionowo	41–39	23–31	23–27	27–34	22–31	27–28	35–37	28–34		22–32	25–31	21–23	35–36	24–31
Orlen Wisła Płock	34–28	29–34	37–24	34–21	26–22	35–13	40–21	44–22	26–16		39–21	32–23	31–20	37–14
Arged Rebud KPR Ostrovia Ostrów Wielkopolski	35–34	27–38	26–27	27–24	23–32	27–24	28–27	32–31	39–33	23–31		29–25	30–28	26–27
Piotrkowianin Piotrków Trybunalski	29–34	26–45	26–31	20–26	33–28	26–27	27–26	21–38	30–29	20–39	29–28		31–30	32–28
Torus Wybrzeże Gdańsk	32–34	28–41	21–27	30–34	32–33	36–38	27–26	22–26	28–30	23–35	36–28	35–20		28–31
Zagłębie Lubin	25–32	24–30	27–37	31–27	24–35	21–25	28–32	29–25	22–23	23–41	29–32	27–32	31–30	

Updated to match(es) played on 19 December 2023. Source: PGNiG Superliga
Legend: Blue = home team win; Red = away team win.
Matches with lighter background shading were decided after overtime.

== Relegation round ==
=== Standings ===
Pos	Team	Pld	W	OTW	OTL	L	GF	GA	GD	Pts	Qualification or relegation
9	Gwardia Opole	31	10	3	2	16	843	886	−43	38	
10	Grupa Azoty Unia Tarnów	31	11	1	1	18	815	922	−107	36	
11	Torus Wybrzeże Gdańsk	31	11	0	2	18	925	953	−28	35	
12	Piotrkowianin Piotrków Trybunalski	31	10	1	0	20	825	953	−128	32	
13	Zagłębie Lubin	31	7	3	1	20	824	946	−122	28	Relegation play-offs
14	Zepter KPR Legionowo	31	4	0	2	25	830	978	−148	14	Relegated to Central League

Source: Orlen Superliga

=== Relegation play-offs ===
Team 1	Agg.	Team 2	1st leg	2nd leg
Padwa Zamość	53–60	Zagłębie Lubin	29–29	24–31

== Play-offs ==
Fifth place
5	Azoty Puławy	30	30
6	Energa MKS Kalisz	25	25
Seventh place
7	KPR Ostrovia	33	33
8	MMTS Kwidzyn	28	28

5th–8th classification
5	Azoty Puławy	37	37
8	MMTS Kwidzyn	36	36
6	Energa MKS Kalisz	27	27
7	KPR Ostrovia	22	22

Quarter-finals
1	Industria Kielce	43	40	2
8	MMTS Kwidzyn	28	25	0
4	Chrobry Głogów	35	34	26	2
5	Azoty Puławy	36	33	24	1
2	Orlen Wisła Płock	37	21	2
7	KPR Ostrovia	28	20	0
3	Górnik Zabrze	26	35	2
6	Energa MKS Kalisz	19	25	0

Semi-finals
1	Industria Kielce	30	34	2
4	Chrobry Głogów	22	22	0
2	Orlen Wisła Płock	31	34	2
3	Górnik Zabrze	30	19	0

Final
1	Industria Kielce	23	27	0
2	Orlen Wisła Płock	24	28	2
Third place game
3	Górnik Zabrze	28	33	2
4	Chrobry Głogów	21	27	0

== Final standings ==
Qualified for the 2024–25 EHF Champions League
Qualified for the 2024–25 EHF European League
Relegation to the Central League

Rank	Team
1	Orlen Wisła Płock
2	Industria Kielce
3	Górnik Zabrze
4	Chrobry Głogów
5	Azoty Puławy
6	Energa MKS Kalisz
7	KPR Ostrovia
8	MMTS Kwidzyn
9	Gwardia Opole
10	Grupa Azoty Unia Tarnów
11	Torus Wybrzeże Gdańsk
12	Piotrkowianin Piotrków Trybunalski
13	Zagłębie Lubin
14	Zepter KPR Legionowo
