= Uladzislau Kulesh =

Belarusian handball player

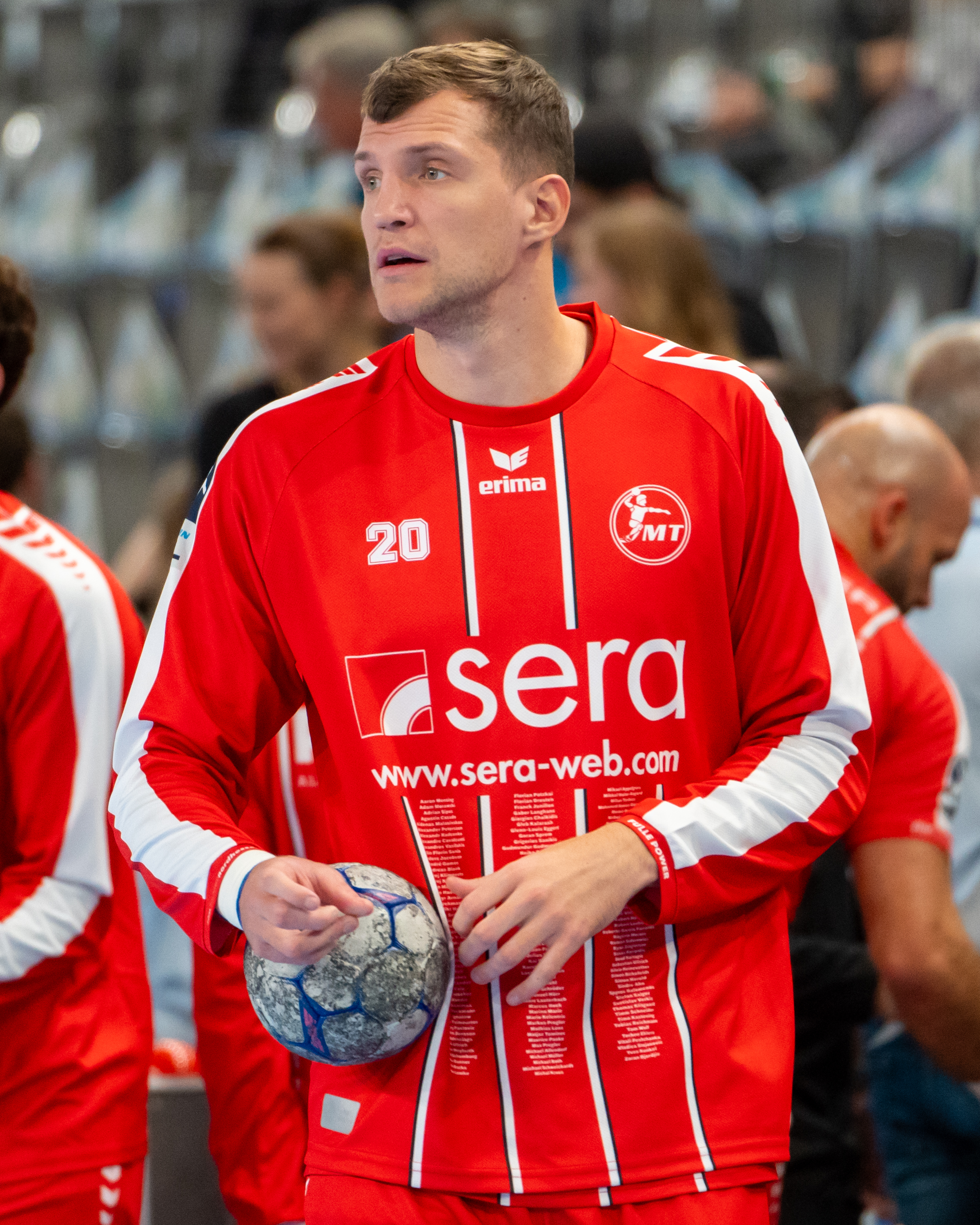
- Kulesh in 2025

Personal information
- Nationality: Belarusian
- Born: 28 May 1996 (age 30) Gomel, Belarus
- Height: 2.06 m (6 ft 9 in)

Sport
- Sport: Handball
- Position: Left back

Senior clubs
- Years: Team
- 2013–2018: SKA Minsk
- 2018–2022: Vive Kielce
- 2022–2025: Hannover-Burgdorf
- 2025–2026: Melsungen
- 2026: Partizan
National team
Years	Team	Apps	(Gls)
2015–present	Belarus	92	(353)
- Updated on 7 January 2023

Uladzislau Kulesh (Belarusian: Уладзіслаў Кулеш; born 28 May 1996) is a Belarusian handball player who last played for Partizan. He also represents the Belarusian national team.

He competed at the 2016 European Men's Handball Championship.

== Honours ==
SKA Minsk

- Baltic League: 2013–14, 2014–15

Vive Kielce

- Polish Superliga: 2018–19, 2019–20, 2020–21, 2021–22
- Polish Cup: 2018–19, 2020–21

Melsungen

- EHF European League: 2025–26

Partizan

- Serbian Supercup: 2026
- All-Serbian Cup: 2026
