= Talant Dujshebaev =

Handball player and coach (born 1968)

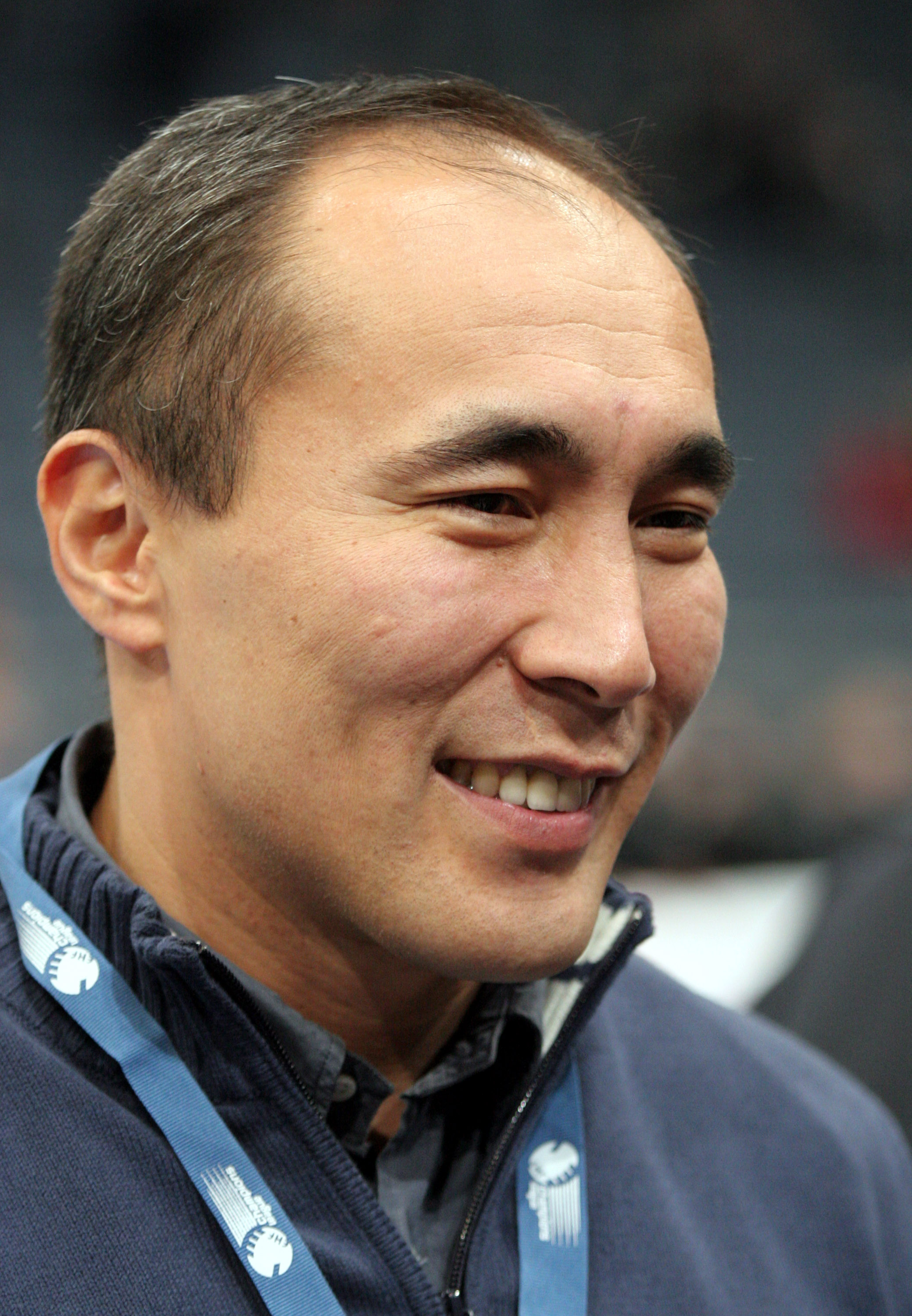
- Dujshebaev managing BM Ciudad Real in 2008

Personal information
- Full name: Talant Mushanbetovich Dujshebaev
- Nationality: Kyrgyz/Russian/Spanish
- Born: 2 June 1968 (age 58) Frunze, Kirghiz SSR, Soviet Union
- Height: 1.83 m (6 ft 0 in)

Sport
- Sport: Handball
- Position: Centre back
- Current club: France (head coach)

Youth career
- Years: Team
- 1976–1985: CSKA Moscow

Senior clubs
- Years: Team
- 1985–1992: CSKA Moscow
- 1992–1997: Teka Cantabria
- 1997–1998: TuS Nettelstedt-Lübbecke
- 1998–2001: GWD Minden
- 2001–2005: BM Ciudad Real
- 2006–2007: BM Ciudad Real
National team
Years	Team		
1988–1989	Soviet Union U-21		
1990–1992	Soviet Union		
1992	Unified Team	7	(47)
1992–1993	Russia	133	(726)
1995–2002	Spain	158	(569)

Teams managed
- 2005–2011: BM Ciudad Real
- 2011–2013: Atlético Madrid
- 2014–2026: Industria Kielce
- 2014–2016: Hungary
- 2016–2017: Poland
- 2026–: France
Medal record
Representing Soviet Union
IHF Junior World Championship
Gold medal – first place	1989 Spain	Player
Representing the Unified Team
Olympic Games
Gold medal – first place	1992 Barcelona	Team
Representing Russia
World Men's Handball Championship
Gold medal – first place	1993 Sweden	Player
Representing Spain
Olympic Games
Bronze medal – third place	1996 Atlanta	Player
Bronze medal – third place	2000 Sydney	Player
European Men's Handball Championship
Silver medal – second place	1996 Spain	Player
Silver medal – second place	1998 Italy	Player
Bronze medal – third place	2000 Croatia	Player

Talant Mushanbetovich Dujshebaev (Russian: Талант Мушанбетович Дуйшебаев; born 2 June 1968) is a former handball player, and current coach, who serves as the head coach for the France national team. Dujshebaev is considered by many to be one of the greatest handball coaches of his generation. He successively played for 4 national teams in his playing career: First for the Soviet Union, then the Unified Team, then Russia and finally Spain. His most usual demarcation as a player was centre backcourt. After initially having success with BM Ciudad Real as a coach, he was coaching Kielce for 12 years.

== Early life and career ==
He was born in Kirghiz Soviet Socialist Republic in the former Soviet Union, and started his playing career in CSKA Moscow. He started playing handball late; at the age of 14. Before that he practiced swimming. He participated on the 1992 Olympic Games as a member of the Unified Team and won the gold medal. He also became the top scorer of the games with 47 goals and was elected into the dream team of the tournament. One year later he participated on the 1993 World Championships as a member of the Russian team and won the gold medal again.

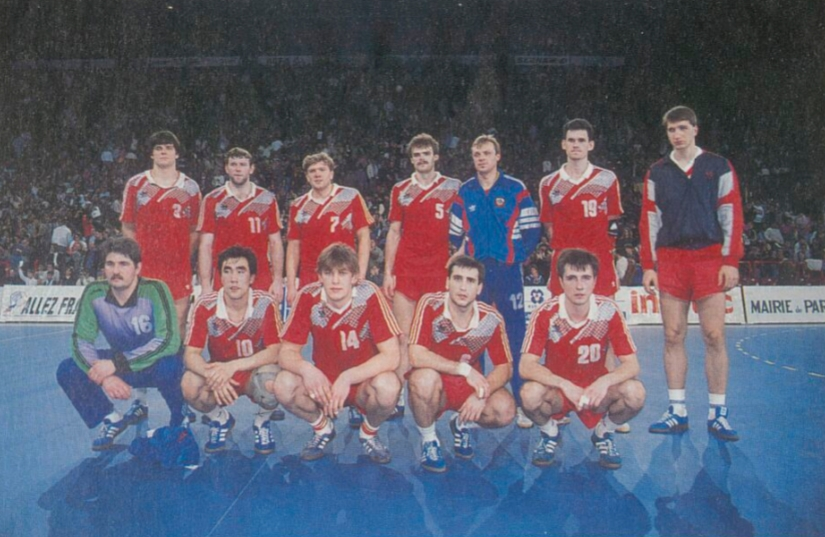
The CIS team in 1992

After the 1992 Summer Olympics he signed for Teka Cantabria and a few years later he received the Spanish citizenship. Afterwards he played in the Spain men's national handball team for nearly a decade, gaining two Olympic bronze medals in 1996 and 2000, and silver and bronze medals on the European championships. He also gained several individual recognitions in the world championships, like being elected as the best player of the tournament in 1997, but he failed to win any medals with the Spanish team, which finished 4th in both 1999 and 2003. Ironically when Spain finally won the world championship in 2005, Dujshebaev was no longer the member of the squad.

With Teka Cantabria he won the 1993 EHF Cup and the 1993-94 EHF Champions League as well as the Spanish Championship in 1993 and 1994.

In 1997 he joined TuS Nettelstedt. Here he won the Euro-City Cup in his first season. He also had the second most goals in the Bundesliga with 194. The season after he joined league rivals GWD Minden.

In 2001, after playing for a few years in Germany on club level, he returned to Spain and signed for BM Ciudad Real where he finished his playing career in 2007. In 2005 he became player-manager of the team, and after his retirement he became the full-time manager. His managerial successes include multiple Liga ASOBAL wins with the team, as well as winning the EHF Champions League in 2006, 2008 and 2009.

In 2006 he briefly returned to the field, when one of the Ciudad center backcourt players, Uroš Zorman injured.

He was voted twice as the IHF World Player of the Year, in 1994 and in 1996. He also came in second in the IHF World Player of the Century voting behind Magnus Wislander from Sweden.

In 2014 (8 January) he replaced Bogdan Wenta as head coach of PGE Vive Kielce.

Contemporaneously with his job in Kielce, he has been also coaching the Hungarian men's national handball team since October 8, 2014 until 2016.

He also coached Poland during the 2016 Summer Olympics and the 2017 World Men's Handball Championship in France.

In February 2026 he became the head coach of the French National team, replacing Guillaume Gille.

In April 2026 he ceased to be the head coach of Kielce after 12 years at the job. He was replaced by his former assistant coach Krzysztof Lijewski.

== Private ==
He is the father of fellow handball players Alex Dujshebaev and Daniel Dujshebaev, both of whom joined their father at Kielce in 2017.

== Honours ==
Player

=== CSKA Moscow ===
- Soviet Handball League: 1986–87
- Soviet Handball Cup: 1986
- EHF Cup Winners' Cup: 1986–87
- EHF Champions League: 1987–88

=== Teka Cantabria ===
- Liga ASOBAL: 1992–93, 1993–94
- Copa del Rey: 1994–95
- Copa ASOBAL: 1996–97, 1997–98
- Supercopa ASOBAL: 1992–93, 1994–95
- EHF Champions League: 1993–94
- EHF Cup: 1992–93
- IHF Super Globe: 1997

=== Nettelstedt-Lübbecke ===
- EHF Challenge Cup: 1997–98

=== Ciudad Real ===
- Liga ASOBAL: 2003–04, 2006–07
- Copa del Rey: 2003
- Copa ASOBAL: 2004, 2005, 2007
- Supercopa ASOBAL: 2005
- EHF Champions Trophy: 2005, 2006
- EHF Cup Winners' Cup: 2002, 2003

Manager

=== Ciudad Real ===
- Liga ASOBAL: 2006–07, 2007–08, 2008–09, 2009–10
- Copa del Rey: 2008, 2011
- Copa ASOBAL: 2005, 2006, 2007, 2008, 2011
- Supercopa ASOBAL: 2005, 2008, 2011
- EHF Champions League: 2005–06, 2007–08, 2008–09
- EHF Champions Trophy: 2005, 2006, 2008
- IHF Super Globe: 2007, 2010

=== Atletico Madrid ===
- Copa del Rey: 2012, 2013
- Supercopa ASOBAL: 2012
- IHF Super Globe: 2012

=== Vive Kielce ===
- Polish Superliga: 2014–15, 2015–16, 2016–17, 2017–18, 2018–19, 2019–20, 2020–21, 2021–22, 2022–23
- Polish Cup: 2015, 2016, 2017, 2018, 2019, 2021, 2025
- EHF Champions League: 2015–16

=== Hungary ===
- 2016 European Championship – 12th

=== Poland ===
- 2016 Summer Olympics – 4th

=== Individual ===
- Top scorer at 1992 Summer Olympics – 47 goals
- Best Center back at 1992 Summer Olympics
- IHF World Player of the Year (2): 1994, 1996
- Best Center back at 1995 World Championship
- MVP at 1996 European Championship
- Best Center back at 1997 World Championship
- MVP at 1997 World Championship
- Best Center back at 1998 European Championship
- MVP at 2000 Summer Olympics
- IHF World Player of the Century – 2nd place
- No. 10 jersey retired at BM Ciudad Real in 2005
- All-Star Team as Best Head Coach at EHF Champions League: 2015, 2022
- EHF Hall of Fame in 2023.

== See also ==
- List of men's handballers with 1000 or more international goals
