= 2024–25 Superliga (men's handball) =

Polish Superliga
- Season: 2024–25
- Dates: 31 August 2024 – 8 June 2025
- Champions: Orlen Wisła Płock
- Relegated: Śląsk Wrocław
- Champions League: Orlen Wisła Płock; Industria Kielce
- European League: REBUD KPR Ostrovia Ostrów Wielkopolski; KGHM Chrobry Głogów
- Matches: 220
- Goals: 13,151 (59.78 per match)
- Top goalscorer: Kamil Adamski (230)

The 2024–25 Superliga was the 69th season of the Polish Superliga, the top men's handball league in Poland. A total of fourteen teams contested this season's league, which began on 31 August 2024 and concluded on 8 June 2025.

Orlen Wisła Płock was the defending champion.

== Teams ==
Location of the 2024–25 Superliga teams.
- The following teams competed in the Superliga during the 2024–25 season:

	Team	Arena	Capacity
1	Orlen Wisła Płock	Orlen Arena	5,492
2	Industria Kielce	Hala Legionów	4,200
3	Górnik Zabrze	HWS Pogoń	1,013
4	KGHM Chrobry Głogów	HWS Głogów	2,500
5	Azoty Puławy	Hala MOSiR Puławy	3,362
6	Netland MKS Kalisz	Arena Kalisz	3,164
7	Rebud KPR Ostrovia	Arena Ostrów	2,500
8	Energa Bank PBS MMTS Kwidzyn	KWS KCSiR	1,504
9	Corotop Gwardia Opole	Stegu Arena	3,378
11	PGE Wybrzeże Gdańsk	HWS AWFiS Gdańsk	1,700
12	Piotrkowianin Piotrków Trybunalski	Hala Relax	1,000
13	Zagłębie Lubin	HWS RCS Lubin	3,714
14	Zepter KPR Legionowo	Arena Legionowo	1,998
CL	WKS Śląsk Wrocław	Hala Orbita	3,000

== Regular season ==
=== Standings ===
Pos	Team	Pld	W	OTW	OTL	L	GF	GA	GD	Pts	Qualification or relegation
1	Orlen Wisła Płock	26	25	0	0	1	894	581	+313	75	Quarterfinals
2	Industria Kielce	26	25	0	0	1	991	672	+319	75	Quarterfinals
3	Rebud KPR Ostrovia Ostrów Wielkopolski	26	16	2	2	6	824	783	+41	54	Quarterfinals
4	KGHM Chrobry Głogów	26	14	1	2	9	781	770	+11	46	Quarterfinals
5	Górnik Zabrze	26	13	1	0	12	777	771	+6	41	Quarterfinals
6	PGE Wybrzeże Gdańsk	26	9	6	2	9	771	798	−27	41	Quarterfinals
7	Corotop Gwardia Opole	26	12	2	1	11	767	781	−14	41	Quarterfinals
8	Netland MKS Kalisz	26	9	2	4	11	713	750	−37	35	Quarterfinals
9	Energa Bank PBS MMTS Kwidzyn	26	9	2	0	15	728	758	−30	31	Relegation round
10	Zagłębie Lubin	26	10	0	1	15	709	816	−107	31	Relegation round
11	Azoty Puławy	26	8	2	2	14	824	910	−86	30	Relegation round
12	Piotrkowianin Piotrków Trybunalski	26	6	0	4	16	737	883	−146	22	Relegation round
13	Zepter KPR Legionowo	26	5	1	0	20	709	790	−81	17	Relegation round
14	WKS Śląsk Wrocław	26	1	1	2	22	658	820	−162	7	Relegation round

Source: Orlen Superliga

== Relegation round ==
=== Standings ===
Pos	Team	Pld	W	OTW	OTL	L	GF	GA	GD	Pts	Qualification or relegation
9	Energa Bank PBS MMTS Kwidzyn	31	12	4	0	15	882	897	−15	44	
10	Zagłębie Lubin	31	11	2	3	15	856	962	−106	40	
11	Azoty Puławy	31	11	2	3	15	1020	1091	−71	40	
12	Piotrkowianin Piotrków Trybunalski	31	6	0	5	20	873	1034	−161	23	
13	Zepter KPR Legionowo	31	6	2	0	23	834	917	−83	22	
14	WKS Śląsk Wrocław	31	3	1	3	24	794	970	−176	14	Relegated to Central League

Source: Orlen Superliga

== Play-offs ==
Fifth place
4	KGHM Chrobry Głogów	39	39
6	PGE Wybrzeże Gdańsk	31	31
Seventh place
7	Corotop Gwardia Opole	34	34
8	Netland MKS Kalisz	32	32

5th–8th classification
4	KGHM Chrobry Głogów	31	31
8	Netland MKS Kalisz	24	24
6	PGE Wybrzeże Gdańsk	29	29
7	Corotop Gwardia Opole	23	23

Quarter-finals
1	Orlen Wisła Płock	40	41	2
8	Netland MKS Kalisz	24	25	0
4	KGHM Chrobry Głogów	29	26	31	1
5	Górnik Zabrze	24	31	32	2
2	Industria Kielce	44	40	2
7	Corotop Gwardia Opole	20	24	0
3	KPR Ostrovia	32	30	29	2
6	PGE Wybrzeże Gdańsk	31	31	27	1

Semi-finals
1	Orlen Wisła Płock	40	35	2
5	Górnik Zabrze	25	20	0
2	Industria Kielce	42	36	2
3	KPR Ostrovia	22	26	0

Final
1	Orlen Wisła Płock	30	25	2
2	Industria Kielce	29	24	0
Third place game
3	KPR Ostrovia	29	31	34	2
5	Górnik Zabrze	28	35	30	1

== Top goalscorers ==
Rank	Player	Club	Goals
1	(Poland) Kamil Adamski	Rebud KPR Ostrovia Ostrów Wielkopolski	230
2	(Poland) Mikołaj Czapliński	PGE Wybrzeże Gdańsk	213
3	(Poland) Paweł Paterek	KGHM Chrobry Głogów	194
4	(Poland) Łukasz Gogola	Azoty Puławy	186
5	(Poland) Mateusz Chabior	Zepter KPR Legionowo	177
6	(Poland) Mateusz Wojdan	Corotop Gwardia Opole	167
7	(Poland) Piotr Rutkowski	Piotrkowianin Piotrków Trybunalski	159
8	(Czech Republic) Daniel Režnický	Rebud KPR Ostrovia Ostrów Wielkopolski	157
9	(Poland) Dawid Krysiak	Zagłębie Lubin	151
10	(Ukraine) Dmytro Artemenko	Górnik Zabrze	148

== Final standings ==
Qualified for the 2025–26 EHF Champions League
Qualified for the 2025–26 EHF European League
Relegation to the Central League

Rank	Team
1	Orlen Wisła Płock
2	Industria Kielce
3	Rebud KPR Ostrovia Ostrów Wielkopolski
4	Górnik Zabrze
5	KGHM Chrobry Głogów
6	PGE Wybrzeże Gdańsk
7	Corotop Gwardia Opole
8	Netland MKS Kalisz
9	Energa Bank PBS MMTS Kwidzyn
10	Zagłębie Lubin
11	Azoty Puławy
12	Piotrkowianin Piotrków Trybunalski
13	Zepter KPR Legionowo
14	WKS Śląsk Wrocław
