= Igor Karačić =

Croatian handball player (born 1988)

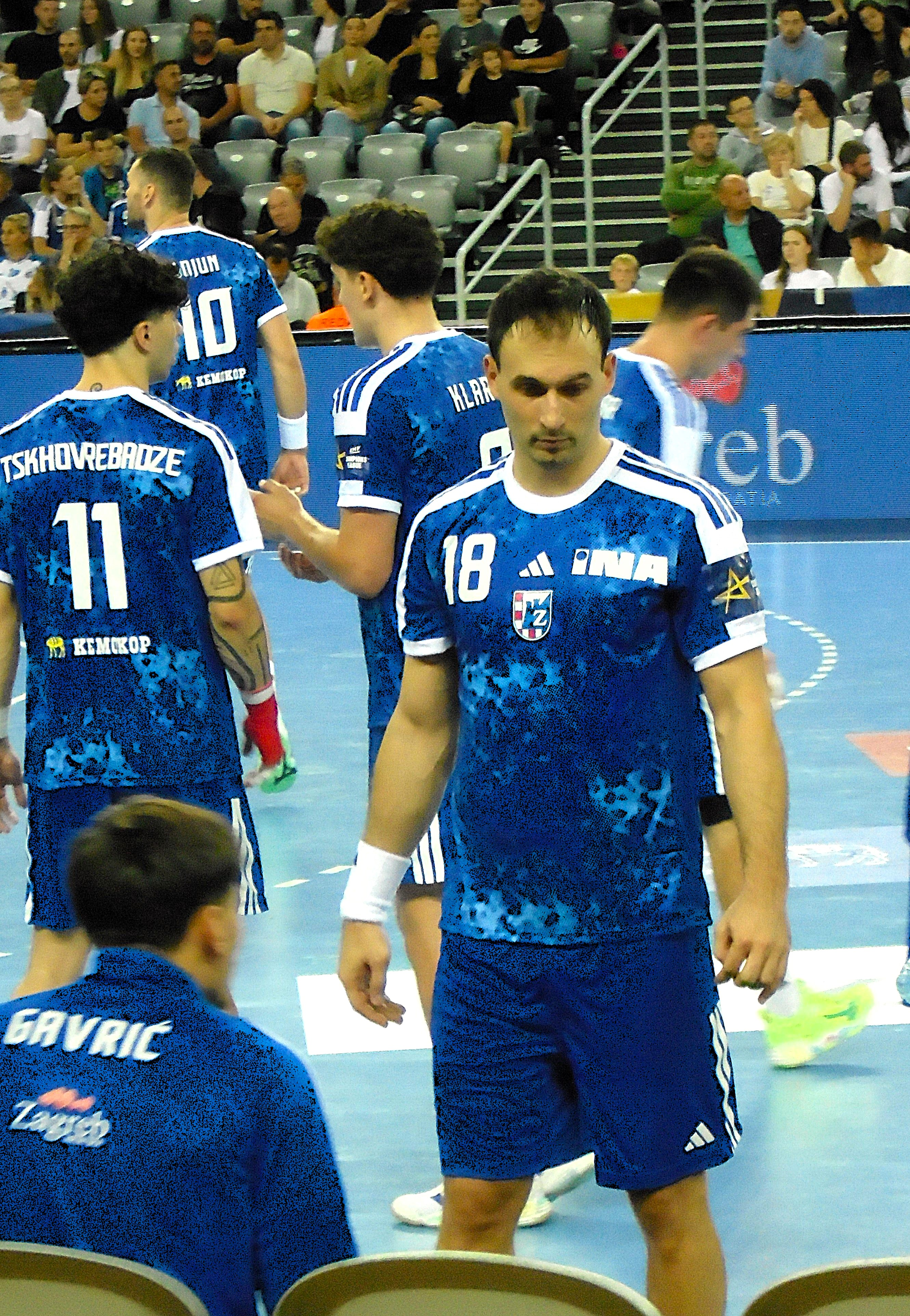

Personal information
- Nationality: Croatian
- Born: 2 November 1988 (age 37) Mostar, SFR Yugoslavia
- Height: 1.89 m (6 ft 2 in)

Sport
- Sport: Handball
- Position: Centre back
- Current club: RK Zagreb
- Number: 18

Senior clubs
- Years: Team
- –2007: HMRK Zrinjski Mostar
- 2007–2009: RK Metković
- 2009–2010: RK Perutnina Pipo IPC
- 2010–2012: RK Bosna Sarajevo
- 2012–2019: RK Vardar
- 2019–2025: Industria Kielce
- 2025–: RK Zagreb
National team
| Years | Team | Apps | (Gls) |
| 2013–2025 | Croatia | 98 | (236) |
Medal record
World Championship
| Silver medal – second place | 2025 Croatia/Denmark/Norway |
European Championship
| Silver medal – second place | 2020 Austria/Sweden/Norway |
| Bronze medal – third place | 2016 Poland |
Mediterranean Games
| Silver medal – second place | 2013 Mersin | Team |
U-19 World Championship
| Silver medal – second place | 2007 Bahrain |
U-18 European Championship
| Gold medal – first place | 2006 Estonia |
- Updated on 26 December 2023

Igor Karačić (born 2 November 1988) is a Croatian handball player for RK Zagreb.

His older brother Ivan Karačić plays for Bosnia and Herzegovina while his younger brother Goran Karačić is a football goalkeeper who plays for Adanaspor.

== Honours ==
Bosna Sarajevo

- BIH Premier League: 2010–2011

Vardar

- Macedonian Super League: 2012–13, 2014–15, 2015–16, 2016–17, 2017–18, 2018–19
- Macedonian Cup: 2014, 2015, 2016, 2017, 2018
- Macedonian Super Cup: 2017, 2018
- EHF Champions League: 2016–17, 2018–19
- SEHA League
  - Winner: 2013–14, 2016–17, 2017–18, 2018–19
  - Runner-up: 2012–13, 2015–16
- IHF Super Globe
  - Third: 2017

Kielce

- Polish Championship: 2020, 2021, 2022, 2023
- Polish Cup: 2021
- IHF Super Globe
  - Third: 2022
