= 2021–22 Superliga (men's handball) =

Polish Superliga
- Season: 2021–22
- Dates: 3 September 2021 – 24 May 2022
- Champions: Łomża Vive Kielce (19th title)
- Relegated: Stal Mielec
- Champions League: Łomża Vive Kielce; Orlen Wisła Płock
- European League: Azoty Puławy; MMTS Kwidzyn; Górnik Zabrze
- Matches played: 182
- Goals scored: 10,103 (55.51 per match)
- Top goalscorer: Kacper Adamski (162 goals)

The 2021–22 Superliga was the 66th season of the Polish Superliga, the top men's handball league in Poland. A total of fourteen teams contested this season's league, which began on 3 September 2021 and concluded on 24 May 2022.

Łomża Vive Kielce won their 19th title of the Polish Champions.

== Format ==
The competition format for the 2021–22 season consists of 14 teams each playing a total of 26 matches, half at home and half away, with the first placed team in the standings earning the Polish Championship. The last placed team is directly relegated to the 1st league, and the penultimate team play relegation playoffs with the willing team from the Central League.

The winners are entitled to play in the EHF Champions League the following season. The 2nd, 3rd and 4th team in the standings gain a chance to take part in the upcoming EHF European League edition.

== Teams ==
Location of the 2021–22 Superliga teams.
- The following teams compete in the Superliga during the 2021–22 season:

	Team	Arena	Capacity
1	Łomża Vive Kielce	Hala Legionów	4,200
2	Orlen Wisła Płock	Orlen Arena	5,492
3	Azoty Puławy	Hala MOSiR Puławy	3,362
4	Górnik Zabrze	HWS Pogoń	1,013
5	Gwardia Opole	Stegu Arena	3,378
6	Energa MKS Kalisz	Arena Kalisz	3,164
7	Chrobry Głogów	HWS Głogów	2,500
8	Sandra SPA Pogoń Szczecin	Netto Arena	5,403
9	MKS Zagłębie Lubin	HWS RCS Lubin	3,714
10	MMTS Kwidzyn	KWS KCSiR	1,504
11	Torus Wybrzeże Gdańsk	HWS AWFiS Gdańsk	1,700
12	Grupa Azoty Unia Tarnów	Arena Jaskółka Tarnów	4,317
13	Piotrkowianin Piotrków Trybunalski	Hala Relax	1,000
14	Handball Stal Mielec	Hala Sportowa SP 7	300

== League table ==
Pos	Team	Pld	W	OTW	OTL	L	GF	GA	GD	Pts	Qualification or relegation
1	Łomża Vive Kielce (C)	26	25	1	0	0	932	649	+283	77	EHF Champions League
2	Orlen Wisła Płock	26	24	0	1	1	850	601	+249	73	EHF Champions League
3	Azoty Puławy	26	18	2	0	6	789	670	+119	58	EHF European League
4	MMTS Kwidzyn	26	13	2	1	10	682	684	−2	44	EHF European League
5	Górnik Zabrze	26	13	1	3	9	688	687	+1	44	EHF European League
6	Energa MKS Kalisz	26	11	3	1	11	731	713	+18	40	
7	Piotrkowianin Piotrków Trybunalski	26	12	0	1	13	708	771	−63	37	
8	Chrobry Głogów	26	9	2	2	13	739	807	−68	33	
9	Gwardia Opole	26	8	4	0	14	642	711	−69	32	
10	Zagłębie Lubin	26	8	1	1	16	699	756	−57	27	
11	Torus Wybrzeże Gdańsk	26	6	1	2	17	657	754	−97	22	
12	Grupa Azoty Unia Tarnów	26	6	1	2	17	643	731	−88	22	
13	Sandra SPA Pogoń Szczecin	26	6	0	3	17	664	768	−104	21	
14	Stal Mielec (R)	26	5	0	1	20	679	801	−122	16	Relegation to the Central League

Source: PGNiG Superliga
(C) Champion; (R) Relegated

== Results ==
Home \ Away	PUL	GLO	KAL	ZAB	TAR	OPO	KIE	KWI	PLO	PIO	SZC	MIE	GDA	LUB
Azoty Puławy		40–28	27–29	33–32	30–21	34–23	28–29	22–19	24–32	36–24	30–19	29–26	35–25	32–31
Chrobry Głogów	31–44		31–30	39–40	28–27	34–22	29–45	29–28	26–30	32–33	27–29	36–27	30–24	28–25
Energa MKS Kalisz	23–28	30–25		25–22	35–23	23–26	26–32	21–22	24–33	32–20	30–28	39–38	35–22	30–28
Górnik Zabrze	23–21	28–29	25–24		29–30	29–25	21–30	22–28	20–34	25–23	24–18	37–28	22–23	29–27
Grupa Azoty Unia Tarnów	26–30	24–25	26–31	26–31		27–24	25–30	26–27	24–31	20–23	28–26	24–20	22–23	28–27
Gwardia Opole	15–32	27–32	23–31	25–23	29–26		22–27	26–24	22–29	33–30	29–28	25–17	32–26	30–27
Łomża Vive Kielce	41–26	43–23	37–29	37–28	51–19	40–24		41–29	27–26	39–21	34–21	35–28	39–25	38–24
MMTS Kwidzyn	31–32	31–29	30–26	19–22	33–31	20–19	23–35		25–34	27–28	24–22	29–23	28–25	23–26
Orlen Wisła Płock	27–26	40–19	39–28	27–21	32–16	33–18	23–25	31–26		36–19	38–25	37–19	35–28	34–21
Piotrkowianin Piotrków Trybunalski	24–26	31–29	30–29	29–34	30–29	26–33	32–38	24–31	22–25		30–32	28–26	26–23	31–24
Sandra SPA Pogoń Szczecin	28–32	30–24	30–33	25–27	21–27	23–31	20–34	27–37	27–38	32–37		27–21	27–33	27–30
Stal Mielec	26–34	30–27	29–30	27–35	28–26	32–28	30–41	27–29	25–37	25–30	27–30		29–28	32–31
Torus Wybrzeże Gdańsk	18–32	30–28	24–30	25–24	23–22	25–27	26–37	24–26	25–37	26–32	24–25	32–23		28–29
Zagłębie Lubin	27–36	33–35	30–28	27–29	25–29	21–20	24–32	23–26	24–35	32–25	32–24	25–23	33–32	

Source: PGNiG Superliga
Legend: Blue = home team win; Red = away team win.
Matches with lighter background shading were decided after overtime.

== Top goalscorers ==
Rank	Player	Club	Goals	Shots	%
1	(Poland) Kacper Adamski	MKS Kalisz	162	252	64
2	(Poland) Arkadiusz Moryto	Vive Kielce	155	192	81
3	(Poland) Patryk Mauer	Gwardia Opole	139	185	75
4	(Ukraine) Andrii Akimenko	Azoty-Puławy	129	164	79
5	(Poland) Paweł Krupa	Pogoń Szczecin	124	234	53
6	(Russia) Sergei Kosorotov	Wisła Płock	121	188	64
7	(Poland) Paweł Paterek	Chrobry Głogów	117	213	55
8	(Poland) Łukasz Gierak	Pogoń Szczecin	116	199	58
9	(Poland) Damian Przytuła	Górnik Zabrze	113	222	51
10	(Poland) Piotr Swat	Piotrkowianin	107	156	69

== Polish clubs in European competitions ==
	Competition	Team	Progress	Result	Total W–D–L
EHF					
EHF	Champions; League	Łomża Vive Kielce	Final	vs (Spain) Barcelona (L) - p	13–1–4
EHF	Champions; League	Łomża Vive Kielce	Semifinal	vs (Hungary) Telekom Veszprém (W)	13–1–4
EHF	Champions; League	Łomża Vive Kielce	Quarter-finals	vs (France) Montpellier Handball (W)	13–1–4
EHF	Champions; League	Łomża Vive Kielce	Group phase	1st of 8 teams (10–0–4)	13–1–4
EHF	European League	Orlen Wisła Płock	Bronze medal match	vs (Croatia) Nexe Našice (W)	14–1–3
EHF	European League	Orlen Wisła Płock	Semifinal	vs (Portugal) SL Benfica (L)	14–1–3
EHF	European League	Orlen Wisła Płock	Quarter-finals	vs (Switzerland) Kadetten Schaffhausen (W)	14–1–3
EHF	European League	Orlen Wisła Płock	Last 16	vs (Germany) TBV Lemgo (W)	14–1–3
EHF	European League	Orlen Wisła Płock	Group phase	1st of 6 teams (9–0–1)	14–1–3
EHF	European League	Orlen Wisła Płock	Qualification Round 2	vs (Romania) HC Dobrogea Sud Constanța (W)	14–1–3
EHF	European League	KS Azoty-Puławy	Qualification Round 2	vs (Germany) Füchse Berlin (L)	2–0–2
EHF	European League	KS Azoty-Puławy	Qualification Round 1	vs (Croatia) MRK Sesvete (W)	2–0–2
EHF	European League	Górnik Zabrze	Qualification Round 1	vs (Norway) ØIF Arendal (L)	1–0–1
