= 2020–21 Superliga (men's handball) =

Polish Superliga
- Season: 2020–21
- Dates: 5 September 2020 – 6 June 2021
- Champions: Łomża Vive Kielce (18th title)
- Champions League: Łomża Vive Kielce
- European League: Orlen Wisła Płock; Azoty Puławy; Górnik Zabrze; Grupa Azoty SPR Tarnów
- Matches played: 182
- Goals scored: 10,047 (55.2 per match)
- Top goalscorer: Rennosuke Tokuda (160 goals)

The 2020–21 Superliga was the 65th season of the Polish Superliga, the top men's handball league in Poland. A total of fourteen teams contested this season's league, which began on 5 September 2020 and concluded on 6 June 2021.

Łomża Vive Kielce won their 18th title of the Polish Champions.

== Format ==
The competition format for the 2020–21 season consists of 14 teams each playing a total of 26 matches, half at home and half away, with the first placed team in the standings earning the Polish Championship. The last placed team is directly relegated to the 1st league, and the penultimate team play relegation playoffs with the willing team from the 1st league.

The winners are entitled to play in the EHF Champions League the following season. The 2nd, 3rd and 4th team in the standings gain a chance to take part in the upcoming EHF European League edition.

== Teams ==
Location of the 2020–21 Superliga teams.
- The following teams compete in the Superliga during the 2021–22 season:

	Team	Arena	Capacity
1	Łomża Vive Kielce	Hala Legionów	4,200
2	Orlen Wisła Płock	Orlen Arena	5,492
3	Górnik Zabrze	HWS Pogoń	1,013
4	Azoty Puławy	Hala MOSiR Puławy	3,362
5	Gwardia Opole	Stegu Arena	3,378
6	Energa MKS Kalisz	Arena Kalisz	3,164
7	MKS Zagłębie Lubin	HWS RCS Lubin	3,714
8	Sandra SPA Pogoń Szczecin	Netto Arena	5,403
9	Chrobry Głogów	HWS Głogów	2,500
10	Piotrkowianin Piotrków Trybunalski	Hala Relax	1,000
11	MMTS Kwidzyn	KWS KCSiR	1,504
12	Torus Wybrzeże Gdańsk	HWS AWFiS Gdańsk	1,700
13	Handball Stal Mielec	Hala Sportowa SP 7	300
14	Grupa Azoty Unia Tarnów	Arena Jaskółka Tarnów	4,317

== Standings ==
Pos	Team	Pld	W	OTW	OTL	L	GF	GA	GD	Pts	Qualification or relegation
1	Łomża Vive Kielce	26	25	1	0	0	919	662	+257	77	EHF Champions League
2	Orlen Wisła Płock	26	23	0	1	2	791	570	+221	70	EHF European League
3	Azoty Puławy	26	20	0	1	5	846	687	+159	61	EHF European League
4	Górnik Zabrze	26	19	0	0	7	689	615	+74	57	EHF European League
5	Gwardia Opole	26	12	1	1	12	735	731	+4	39	
6	Energa MKS Kalisz	26	11	2	0	13	688	704	−16	37	
7	Chrobry Głogów	26	10	2	1	13	725	792	−67	35	
8	Sandra SPA Pogoń Szczecin	26	11	0	1	14	687	743	−56	34	
9	Zagłębie Lubin	26	8	0	5	13	685	757	−72	29	
10	MMTS Kwidzyn	26	7	2	1	16	624	721	−97	26	
11	Torus Wybrzeże Gdańsk	26	6	2	1	17	655	762	−107	23	
12	Grupa Azoty SPR Tarnów	26	7	0	0	19	646	754	−108	21	EHF European League
13	Piotrkowianin Piotrków Trybunalski	26	5	2	1	18	702	779	−77	20	
14	Stal Mielec	26	4	2	1	19	655	770	−115	17	

Source: PGNiG Superliga

== Results ==
Home \ Away	PUL	GLO	KAL	ZAB	TAR	OPO	KIE	KWI	PLO	PIO	SZC	MIE	GDA	LUB
Azoty Puławy		32–27	36–22	20–21	38–23	30–28	29–33	42–27	24–33	31–30	35–24	35–21	30–26	36–29
Chrobry Głogów	28–44		27–29	27–29	25–27	31–35	20–31	23–31	24–35	30–29	30–29	29–27	32–29	32–29
Energa MKS Kalisz	24–35	27–32		21–25	28–27	33–26	28–33	27–16	25–29	35–28	20–18	28–24	30–23	27–28
Górnik Zabrze	22–28	32–27	24–25		28–19	23–24	24–31	31–20	18–27	29–24	28–24	27–25	38–21	28–24
Grupa Azoty SPR Tarnów	20–33	24–34	30–33	20–27		27–34	20–31	26–23	22–27	24–21	19–31	24–20	29–30	24–26
Gwardia Opole	25–35	32–30	28–26	20–29	31–30		29–37	34–20	27–35	33–29	28–21	41–24	27–18	25–26
Łomża Vive Kielce	30–29	37–26	32–25	34–30	37–26	39–24		40–26	33–32	40–21	37–22	38–28	34–25	44–23
MMTS Kwidzyn	25–29	27–28	22–21	23–24	29–26	25–24	24–34		20–29	27–28	25–28	30–23	22–28	28–27
Orlen Wisła Płock	34–25	34–20	30–25	27–18	32–21	28–18	19–31	34–17		30–23	31–16	44–18	29–19	31–25
Piotrkowianin Piotrków Trybunalski	28–40	28–29	26–29	20–30	31–27	29–35	24–38	24–25	23–29		32–29	35–36	26–27	35–34
Sandra SPA Pogoń Szczecin	22–33	34–36	27–24	23–27	31–26	30–24	29–40	31–25	26–24	19–30		34–33	27–26	30–32
Stal Mielec	28–31	26–27	26–28	17–22	29–30	31–28	24–33	25–26	18–28	29–35	24–26		26–22	23–21
Torus Wybrzeże Gdańsk	38–36	29–25	30–32	24–29	23–29	21–36	26–33	25–24	16–31	28–33	29–27	26–27		24–28
Zagłębie Lubin	23–32	34–36	27–25	20–26	22–26	30–26	32–43	19–27	22–32	24–19	29–31	33–34	31–33	

Source: PGNiG Superliga
Legend: Blue = home team win; Red = away team win.
