= 2017–18 Superliga (men's handball) =

Polish Superliga
- Season: 2017–18
- Dates: 1 September 2017 – 3 June 2018
- Champions: PGE Vive Kielce (15th title)
- Champions League: PGE Vive Kielce; Orlen Wisła Płock
- EHF Cup: Azoty Puławy; Gwardia Opole
- Matches played: 260
- Goals scored: 14,545 (55.94 per match)
- Top goalscorer: Arkadiusz Moryto (217 goals)

The 2017–18 Superliga was the 62nd season of the Polish Superliga, the top men's handball league in Poland. A total of fourteen teams contested this season's league, which began on 1 September 2017 and concluded on 3 June 2018.

PGE Vive Kielce won their 15th title of the Polish Champions.

== Format ==
The competition format for the 2017–18 season consisted of 2 groups of eight teams each playing a total of 30 matches, half at home and half away, with the top 3 teams of each group qualifying directly for the quarterfinals. The teams ranked 4th and 5th play for a place in the quarterfinals.

== Regular season ==
- A victory over a team of the same group add 1 extra point.

=== Grenade Group ===
Pos	Team	Pld	W	OTW	OTL	L	GF	GA	GD	Pts	Qualification
1	PGE Vive Kielce	30	30	0	0	0	1168	741	+427	104	Quarterfinals
2	NMC Górnik Zabrze	30	23	0	0	7	892	766	+126	80	Quarterfinals
3	Chrobry Głogów	30	17	0	0	13	811	829	−18	59	Quarterfinals
4	MMTS Kwidzyn	30	15	0	3	12	797	839	−42	56	Playoffs; First round
5	Zagłębie Lubin	30	11	2	1	16	884	889	−5	45	Playoffs; First round
6	Meble Wójcik Elbląg	30	7	0	0	23	709	858	−149	26	
7	KPR Legionowo	30	4	2	1	23	722	864	−142	19	
8	Spójnia Gdynia	30	2	0	1	27	767	989	−222	8	

Source: PGNiG Superliga

EP
14
11
8
8
7
5
2
1

=== Orange Group ===
Pos	Team	Pld	W	OTW	OTL	L	GF	GA	GD	Pts	Qualification
1	Orlen Wisła Płock	30	27	1	0	2	969	686	+283	97	Quarterfinals
2	Azoty Puławy	30	23	1	1	5	919	792	+127	84	Quarterfinals
3	Gwardia Opole	30	15	1	2	12	835	846	−11	56	Quarterfinals
4	Energa MKS Kalisz	30	13	1	0	16	755	819	−64	48	Playoffs; First round
5	Wybrzeże Gdańsk	30	12	1	1	16	768	814	−46	44	Playoffs; First round
6	Piotrkowianin Piotrków Trybunalski	30	10	1	4	15	791	852	−61	39	
7	Stal Mielec	30	8	3	0	19	849	958	−109	34	
8	Sandra SPA Pogoń Szczecin	30	7	3	2	18	745	839	−94	33	

Source: PGNiG Superliga

EP
14
12
7
7
5
3
4
4

=== Results ===
Home \ Away	AZO	GLO	KAL	OPO	LEG	ELB	KWI	ZAB	PLO	KIE	PIO	SZC	GDY	MIE	GDA	LUB
Azoty Puławy		27–25	27–22	38–35	29–24	30–19	27–18	25–24	26–28	25–30	33–26	33–22	40–25	32–23	36–20	33–26
Chrobry Głogów	24–28		27–26	23–24	30–25	36–29	23–26	19–31	20–29	28–43	30–28	28–19	38–25	26–18	31–26	30–29
Energa MKS Kalisz	30–34	25–29		31–28	27–25	25–21	19–21	24–32	19–27	20–36	25–22	25–16	22–21	30–27	25–24	28–24
Gwardia Opole	29–33	23–28	28–21		26–22	26–19	22–23	27–31	20–32	21–43	31–22	26–22	33–24	37–27	30–28	37–30
KPR Legionowo	22–25	22–31	29–24	26–25		20–25	24–26	18–32	26–41	28–45	27–26	25–27	21–20	31–23	26–31	21–23
Meble Wójcik Elbląg	23–29	28–29	24–26	20–23	29–20		25–24	17–28	18–43	22–38	27–20	21–18	24–23	20–36	18–29	37–30
MMTS Kwidzyn	32–25	28–31	22–23	26–34	27–24	27–21		24–26	24–38	24–37	29–32	32–29	32–27	38–32	24–22	33–29
NMC Górnik Zabrze	36–34	28–26	33–26	36–23	27–20	31–28	38–23		21–27	28–37	27–28	30–21	34–20	37–28	33–25	33–31
Orlen Wisła Płock	31–21	32–23	35–22	29–16	37–25	29–17	32–21	33–25		30–31	26–24	27–21	39–23	37–26	29–25	31–27
PGE Vive Kielce	41–29	46–23	37–21	39–28	40–17	43–25	36–21	33–20	36–30		40–24	40–27	46–27	41–22	41–24	32–24
Piotrkowianin	33–34	29–26	33–26	29–33	23–22	31–26	30–31	26–28	23–31	24–43		30–23	39–32	26–29	21–25	29–26
Sandra SPA Pogoń Szczecin	24–38	28–30	28–17	29–27	28–24	29–24	25–20	20–30	17–33	29–38	30–29		33–27	36–37	22–24	31–30
Spójnia Gdynia	26–43	26–29	27–34	30–37	31–34	32–28	22–32	25–28	22–34	27–46	26–28	24–18		31–35	18–28	19–33
Stal Mielec	26–31	29–17	29–34	40–38	32–28	26–23	37–32	29–35	22–36	22–39	28–29	22–33	40–39		33–25	26–33
Wybrzeże Gdańsk	25–26	24–30	22–32	23–24	28–22	27–22	31–30	21–26	26–31	26–32	29–20	30–25	27–23	28–26		31–30
Zagłębie Lubin	32–36	28–21	32–28	33–34	38–37	30–29	29–33	28–24	21–36	25–39	28–23	35–34	36–26	40–28	36–21	

Source: PGNiG Superliga
Legend: Blue = home team win; Red = away team win.

== Playoffs ==
=== First round ===
Team 1	Agg.	Team 2	1st leg	2nd leg
Wybrzeże Gdańsk	55–53	MMTS Kwidzyn	30–23	25–30
Zagłębie Lubin	51–62	Energa MKS Kalisz	27–26	24–36

=== Final round ===
Quarterfinals
G1	PGE Vive Kielce	35	43	2
O4	Energa MKS Kalisz	21	22	0
G3	Chrobry Głogów	25	24	0
O2	Azoty Puławy	28	24	1
G2	NMC Górnik Zabrze	24	25	49
O3	Gwardia Opole	28	23	51
O5	Wybrzeże Gdańsk	25	32	0
O1	Orlen Wisła Płock	36	37	2

Semifinals
G1	PGE Vive Kielce	37	35	2
O2	Azoty Puławy	27	34	0
O3	Gwardia Opole	33	21	54
O1	Orlen Wisła Płock	32	33	65

Finals
G1	PGE Vive Kielce	33	33	2
O1	Orlen Wisła Płock	28	29	0
Third place
O2	Azoty Puławy	30	31	2
O3	Gwardia Opole	28	26	0

== Final standings ==
Qualified for the 2018–19 EHF Champions League
Qualified for the 2018–19 EHF Cup

Rank	Team
1	PGE Vive Kielce
2	Orlen Wisła Płock
3	Azoty Puławy
4	Gwardia Opole
5	NMC Górnik Zabrze
6	Chrobry Głogów
7	Energa MKS Kalisz
8	Wybrzeże Gdańsk
9	MMTS Kwidzyn
10	Zagłębie Lubin
11	Piotrkowianin Piotrków Trybunalski
12	Stal Mielec
13	Sandra SPA Pogoń Szczecin
14	Meble Wójcik Elbląg
15	KPR Legionowo
16	Spójnia Gdynia
