= 2019–20 Superliga (men's handball) =

Polish Superliga
- Season: 2019–20
- Dates: 30 August 2019 – 12 March 2020
- Champions: PGE Vive Kielce (17th title)
- Champions League: PGE Vive Kielce
- European League: Orlen Wisła Płock; Azoty Puławy
- Matches played: 169
- Goals scored: 9,284 (54.93 per match)
- Top goalscorer: Arkadiusz Moryto (127 goals)

The 2019–20 Superliga was the 64th season of the Polish Superliga, the top men's handball league in Poland. A total of fourteen teams contested this season's league, which began on 30 August 2019, and was prematurely ended due to the 2020 coronavirus outbreak.

On 23 March 2020, the governing body of the competition decided to end the season, and declare PGE Vive Kielce the winners, as the first placed team in the regular season standings.

The team from Kielce won their 17th title of the Polish Champions.

== Format ==
The competition format for the 2019–20 season consists of 14 teams each playing a total of 26 matches, half at home and half away, with the first placed team in the standings earning the Polish Championship. The last placed team is directly relegated to the 1st league, and the penultimate team in the standings play relegation playoffs with the willing team from the 1st league.

The winners are entitled to play in the EHF Champions League the following season. The 2nd, 3rd and 4th team in the standings gain a chance to take part in the upcoming EHF European League edition.

Due to the 2020 coronavirus outbreak, the relegation round and the playoffs were cancelled.

== Regular season ==
=== Standings ===
| Pos | Team | Pld | W | OTW | OTL | L | GF | GA | GD | Pts | Qualification |
|---|---|---|---|---|---|---|---|---|---|---|---|
| 1 | PGE Vive Kielce | 25 | 24 | 0 | 0 | 1 | 916 | 608 | +308 | 72 | EHF Champions League |
| 2 | Orlen Wisła Płock | 24 | 23 | 0 | 0 | 1 | 715 | 516 | +199 | 69 | EHF European League |
| 3 | NMC Górnik Zabrze | 24 | 18 | 1 | 1 | 4 | 699 | 614 | +85 | 57 | |
| 4 | Azoty Puławy | 25 | 16 | 0 | 2 | 7 | 761 | 673 | +88 | 50 | EHF European League |
| 5 | Gwardia Opole | 24 | 11 | 2 | 0 | 11 | 647 | 675 | −28 | 37 | |
| 6 | Energa MKS Kalisz | 24 | 10 | 1 | 1 | 12 | 611 | 658 | −47 | 33 | |
| 7 | Zagłębie Lubin | 24 | 10 | 1 | 0 | 13 | 633 | 683 | −50 | 32 | |
| 8 | Sandra SPA Pogoń Szczecin | 24 | 10 | 0 | 1 | 13 | 634 | 677 | −43 | 31 | |
| 9 | Chrobry Głogów | 24 | 8 | 1 | 3 | 12 | 659 | 702 | −43 | 29 | |
| 10 | Piotrkowianin Piotrków Trybunalski | 24 | 7 | 1 | 0 | 16 | 646 | 687 | −41 | 23 | |
| 11 | MMTS Kwidzyn | 24 | 7 | 0 | 0 | 17 | 609 | 694 | −85 | 21 | |
| 12 | Torus Wybrzeże Gdańsk | 24 | 6 | 1 | 0 | 17 | 589 | 684 | −95 | 20 | |
| 13 | Stal Mielec | 24 | 6 | 1 | 0 | 17 | 592 | 697 | −105 | 20 | |
| 14 | Grupa Azoty Tarnów | 24 | 3 | 1 | 2 | 18 | 573 | 716 | −143 | 13 | |

Source: PGNiG Superliga

=== Results ===
| Home \ Away | PUL | GLO | KAL | TAR | OPO | KWI | ZAB | PLO | KIE | PIO | SZC | MIE | GDA | LUB |
|---|---|---|---|---|---|---|---|---|---|---|---|---|---|---|
| Azoty Puławy | | 33–29 | 37–27 | 28–18 | 36–38 | 35–27 | 33–34 | 20–24 | 32–39 | 39–35 | 37–23 | 36–28 | 32–24 | 27–23 |
| Chrobry Głogów | 27–25 | | | 34–27 | 41–29 | 24–27 | 31–32 | | 27–34 | 28–26 | 28–26 | 26–23 | 32–33 | 29–31 |
| Energa MKS Kalisz | | 31–26 | | 33–28 | 25–27 | 27–23 | 17–28 | 23–26 | 22–42 | 27–26 | 26–29 | 26–20 | 26–23 | 27–30 |
| Grupa Azoty Tarnów | 21–35 | 31–29 | 24–25 | | 31–26 | | 23–33 | 16–33 | 19–33 | 23–22 | 22–28 | 27–23 | 31–34 | 27–35 |
| Gwardia Opole | 24–33 | 27–23 | 32–31 | 29–22 | | 29–25 | 19–20 | 23–28 | 18–29 | 29–26 | 33–24 | | 28–22 | 36–31 |
| MMTS Kwidzyn | 22–28 | 25–26 | 29–27 | 33–29 | 21–24 | | 19–25 | 19–25 | 22–40 | 28–26 | 35–28 | 30–24 | | 28–23 |
| NMC Górnik Zabrze | 32–25 | 35–29 | 28–23 | 23–22 | 37–31 | 32–36 | | 23–24 | 27–34 | 34–36 | | 30–22 | 29–20 | 38–27 |
| Orlen Wisła Płock | 25–17 | 42–23 | 30–23 | 33–14 | 26–20 | 37–21 | 25–20 | | 27–26 | 35–22 | 26–25 | 38–22 | 34–20 | 28–22 |
| PGE Vive Kielce | 34–31 | 47–26 | 38–16 | 52–30 | 38–21 | 45–32 | 34–24 | 29–20 | | | 45–28 | 33–20 | 38–24 | 36–24 |
| Piotrkowianin Piotrków Trybunalski | 25–35 | 27–23 | 23–26 | 22–21 | | 32–20 | 24–28 | 24–33 | 35–42 | | 29–27 | 29–25 | 32–29 | 28–21 |
| Sandra SPA Pogoń Szczecin | 25–34 | 27–19 | 22–19 | | 26–23 | 27–24 | 26–31 | 23–28 | 21–30 | 33–29 | | 27–29 | 29–28 | 28–18 |
| Stal Mielec | 25–27 | 24–31 | 29–30 | 31–30 | 34–26 | 28–27 | | 22–36 | 20–36 | 24–22 | 27–31 | | 23–27 | 27–25 |
| Torus Wybrzeże Gdańsk | 25–26 | 26–33 | 20–27 | 25–22 | 26–34 | 26–22 | 27–32 | 19–32 | 17–27 | 29–23 | 31–27 | 19–24 | | |
| Zagłębie Lubin | 28–26 | 28–26 | 27–36 | 28–26 | 27–31 | 27–24 | 24–30 | | 25–35 | 29–26 | 29–25 | 32–23 | 24–19 | |

Source: PGNiG Superliga
Legend: Blue = home team win; Red = away team win.
