= Michał Jurecki =

Polish handball player (born 1984)

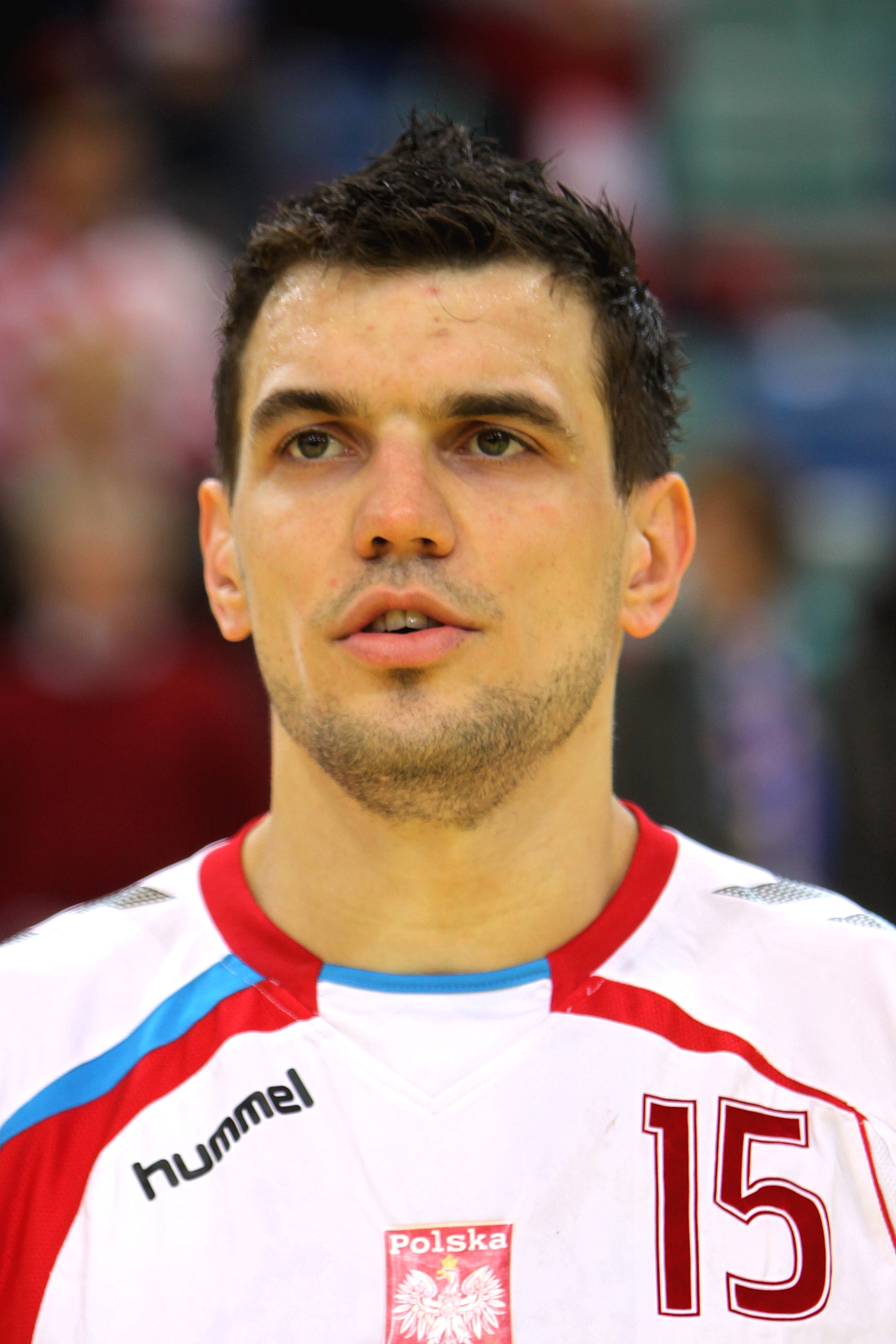

Personal information
- Full name: Michał Jurecki
- Nationality: Polish
- Born: 27 October 1984 (age 41) Kościan, Poland
- Height: 1.98 m (6 ft 6 in)

Sport
- Sport: Handball
- Position: Left back

Senior clubs
- Years: Team
- 2003–2006: SPR Chrobry Głogów
- 2006–2007: Vive Targi Kielce
- 2007–2008: HSV Hamburg
- 2008–2010: TuS Nettelstedt-Lübbecke
- 2010–2019: PGE Vive Kielce
- 2019–2020: SG Flensburg-Handewitt
- 2020–2023: KS Azoty-Puławy
National team
Years	Team	Apps	(Gls)
2005–2017	Poland	200	(547)
Medal record
Representing Poland
Men's handball
World Championship
Silver medal – second place	2007 Germany
Bronze medal – third place	2009 Croatia
Bronze medal – third place	2015 Qatar

Michał Jurecki (born 27 October 1984) is a Polish retired handball player.

== Private life ==
His older brother Bartosz Jurecki is a former handball player and current manager. In 2007 Michał married to Joanna. They have daughter Oliwia, born on 6 September 2007. In 2015 his wife gave birth to their second daughter named Julia.

== Career ==
He received a silver medal with the Polish team at the 2007 World Men's Handball Championship and a bronze medal in 2009 and in 2015. He participated at the 2008 Summer Olympics, where Poland finished fifth and at the 2016 Summer Olympics where Poland took fourth place. At the 2016 European Championship he was awarded All Star Left back of the tournament.

== Achievements ==
PGE Vive Kielce

- Polish Superliga: 2011–12, 2012–13, 2013–14, 2014–15, 2015–16, 2016–17, 2017–18, 2018–19
- Cup of Poland: 2011, 2012, 2013, 2014, 2015, 2016, 2017, 2018, 2019
- EHF Champions League: 2015–16

=== Individual ===
- 2016 European Championship - All-Star Left back

=== State awards ===
- 2007 Gold Cross of Merit
- 2015 Knight's Cross of Polonia Restituta
