= Salacz =

Salacz is a surname. Notable people with the surname include:

- László Salacz (born 1971), Hungarian lawyer and politician
- Paweł Salacz (born 1997), Polish handball player
