= 2018–19 Superliga (men's handball) =

Polish Superliga
- Season: 2018–19
- Dates: 31 August 2018 – 29 May 2019
- Champions: PGE Vive Kielce (16th title)
- Relegated: Arka Gdynia
- Champions League: PGE Vive Kielce; Orlen Wisła Płock
- EHF Cup: Gwardia Opole; NMC Górnik Zabrze; Azoty Puławy
- Matches played: 230
- Goals scored: 12,644 (54.97 per match)
- Top goalscorer: Arkadiusz Moryto (158 goals)

The 2018–19 Superliga was the 63rd season of the Polish Superliga, the top men's handball league in Poland. A total of fourteen teams contested this season's league, which began on 31 August 2018 and concluded on 29 May 2019.

PGE Vive Kielce won their 16th title of the Polish Champions.

== Regular season ==
=== Standings ===
Pos	Team	Pld	W	OTW	OTL	L	GF	GA	GD	Pts	Qualification
1	PGE Vive Kielce	26	25	1	0	0	973	681	+292	77	Quarterfinals
2	Orlen Wisła Płock	26	21	2	1	2	800	582	+218	68	Quarterfinals
3	NMC Górnik Zabrze	26	18	2	1	5	743	643	+100	59	Quarterfinals
4	Gwardia Opole	26	17	0	1	8	732	722	+10	52	Quarterfinals
5	Azoty Puławy	26	15	1	1	9	771	686	+85	48	Quarterfinals
6	MMTS Kwidzyn	26	13	2	2	9	644	657	−13	45	Quarterfinals
7	Piotrkowianin Piotrków Trybunalski	26	12	1	1	12	709	750	−41	39	Quarterfinals
8	Chrobry Głogów	26	12	0	0	14	694	700	−6	36	Quarterfinals
9	Torus Wybrzeże Gdańsk	26	9	0	2	15	691	754	−63	29	Relegation round
10	Zagłębie Lubin	26	9	1	0	16	641	707	−66	29	Relegation round
11	Energa MKS Kalisz	26	7	2	1	16	651	710	−59	26	Relegation round
12	Sandra SPA Pogoń Szczecin	26	6	0	1	19	648	762	−114	19	Relegation round
13	Stal Mielec	26	5	0	1	20	686	821	−135	16	Relegation round
14	Arka Gdynia	26	1	0	0	25	662	870	−208	3	Relegation round

Source: PGNiG Superliga

=== Results ===
Home \ Away	GDY	PUL	GLO	KAL	OPO	KWI	ZAB	PLO	KIE	PIO	SZC	MIE	GDA	LUB
Arka Gdynia		33–37	21–25	28–24	29–40	27–33	19–31	27–31	31–40	33–37	27–30	30–35	34–42	21–28
Azoty Puławy	35–22		34–26	28–24	34–22	26–17	30–32	21–24	30–35	31–27	30–23	35–20	28–27	35–24
Chrobry Głogów	41–29	34–33		22–24	29–34	27–21	22–26	26–33	30–38	29–23	25–28	25–24	26–21	23–19
Energa MKS Kalisz	27–16	24–25	26–24		26–31	27–25	28–30	26–29	27–37	24–29	26–24	29–28	29–31	27–29
Gwardia Opole	30–19	26–30	29–27	30–28		24–21	26–23	24–37	26–36	29–30	28–22	33–31	32–29	34–20
MMTS Kwidzyn	25–19	28–26	24–22	24–21	26–27		27–26	24–25	22–39	33–28	27–22	29–20	30–27	25–23
NMC Górnik Zabrze	38–24	28–25	29–24	29–26	32–25	30–21		24–26	24–32	27–20	32–26	35–26	28–19	28–25
Orlen Wisła Płock	36–17	28–17	29–21	30–18	29–17	29–16	25–26		24–31	38–24	42–21	38–22	38–27	28–20
PGE Vive Kielce	38–25	35–18	35–27	43–20	40–30	36–27	32–23	33–30		39–23	48–29	35–28	42–28	31–21
Piotrkowianin Piotrków Trybunalski	36–26	32–31	30–27	27–22	23–25	22–25	26–28	24–40	32–45		29–25	34–26	26–27	30–29
Sandra SPA Pogoń Szczecin	20–19	30–37	20–26	25–28	26–27	17–28	22–26	23–31	23–40	27–29		28–31	34–27	27–21
Stal Mielec	40–32	24–41	24–30	19–24	28–39	32–33	25–37	20–32	28–39	27–29	27–33		30–25	27–24
Torus Wybrzeże Gdańsk	33–27	16–31	25–28	33–28	25–28	26–27	32–31	21–26	29–42	17–20	25–20	29–23		29–25
Zagłębie Lubin	38–27	31–28	21–28	22–28	26–19	23–21	16–28	19–29	26–35	28–27	30–25	29–26	29–25	

Source: PGNiG Superliga
Legend: Blue = home team win; Red = away team win.

== Relegation round ==
=== Standings ===
Pos	Team	Pld	W	OTW	OTL	L	GF	GA	GD	Pts	Qualification
1	Energa MKS Kalisz	10	8	0	0	2	275	247	+28	24	
2	Sandra SPA Pogoń Szczecin	10	6	0	1	3	282	245	+37	19	
3	Torus Wybrzeże Gdańsk	10	4	1	1	4	268	274	−6	15	
4	Zagłębie Lubin	10	4	0	0	6	269	278	−9	12	
5	Stal Mielec	10	2	2	0	6	269	277	−8	10	Relegation playoffs
6	Arka Gdynia	10	3	0	1	6	259	301	−42	10	Relegation

Source: PGNiG Superliga

=== Results ===
Home \ Away	GDY	KAL	SZC	MIE	GDA	LUB
Arka Gdynia		29–31	28–27	30–41	29–30	26–30
Energa MKS Kalisz	32–19		25–24	26–22	27–22	23–28
Sandra SPA Pogoń Szczecin	39–14	24–22		31–33	31–24	31–27
Stal Mielec	23–32	23–29	25–27		23–24	26–27
Torus Wybrzeże Gdańsk	30–28	27–30	25–27	31–32		35–30
Zagłębie Lubin	22–26	29–30	26–23	26–30	24–28	

Source: PGNiG Superliga
Legend: Blue = home team win; Red = away team win.

=== Playoffs ===
Team 1	Agg.	Team 2	1st leg	2nd leg
Nielba Wągrowiec	53–64	Stal Mielec	28–35	25–29

== Playoffs ==
Quarterfinals
1	PGE Vive Kielce	41	34	2
8	Chrobry Głogów	22	28	0
5	Azoty Puławy	25	25	0
4	Gwardia Opole	27	28	2
3	NMC Górnik Zabrze	21	26	47
6	MMTS Kwidzyn	19	31	50
8	Piotrkowianin	26	20	0
2	Orlen Wisła Płock	32	33	2

Semifinals
1	PGE Vive Kielce	31	37	68
4	Gwardia Opole	32	28	60
6	MMTS Kwidzyn	13	16	0
2	Orlen Wisła Płock	25	28	2

Finals
1	PGE Vive Kielce	26	32	1
2	Orlen Wisła Płock	26	25	0
Third place
4	Gwardia Opole	25	26	51
6	MMTS Kwidzyn	26	24	50

== Final standings ==
Qualified for the 2019–20 EHF Champions League
Qualified for the 2019–20 EHF Cup
Relegation to the 1st league

Rank	Team
1	PGE Vive Kielce
2	Orlen Wisła Płock
3	Gwardia Opole
4	MMTS Kwidzyn
5	NMC Górnik Zabrze
6	Azoty Puławy
7	Piotrkowianin Piotrków Trybunalski
8	Chrobry Głogów
9	Energa MKS Kalisz
10	Sandra SPA Pogoń Szczecin
11	Torus Wybrzeże Gdańsk
12	Zagłębie Lubin
13	Stal Mielec
14	Arka Gdynia
