= Hutnik Kraków (handball) =

Polish handball club

- Full name: Klub Sportowy Hutnik Kraków
- Founded: 1950 (club); 1961 (handball team)
- Arena: Hala Widowiskowo–Sportowa Suche Stawy, Kraków
- Club colours

Hutnik Kraków – was a handball section of the same name club from Poland based in Nowa Huta, Kraków's district. The team played at the highest level of the Polish Handball League. Three–time Polish Champion (1979, 1980, 1981) and three–time Polish Cup winner (1978, 1983, 1986).

== Honours ==
- Polish Superliga

Winners (3): 1978–79, 1979–80, 1980–81

- Polish Cup

Winners (3): 1977–78, 1982–83, 1985–86

== See also ==
- Handball in Poland
- Sports in Poland
