= Kamil Adamczyk =

Polish handball player (born 1998)

Personal information
- Nationality: Polish
- Born: 7 May 1998 (age 28) Gdańsk, Poland
- Height: 1.96 m (6 ft 5 in)

Sport
- Sport: Handball
- Position: Right back
- Current club: Wybrzeże Gdańsk
- Number: 44

Senior clubs
- Years: Team
- 2015–: Wybrzeże Gdańsk
- 2017–2018: → GKS Żukowo (loan)
National team
Years	Team	Apps	(Gls)
2018–	Poland	5	(3)

Kamil Adamczyk (born 7 May 1998) is a Polish handball player for Wybrzeże Gdańsk and the Polish national team.
