= Unia Tarnów (handball) =

Men's handball club from Tarnów, Poland

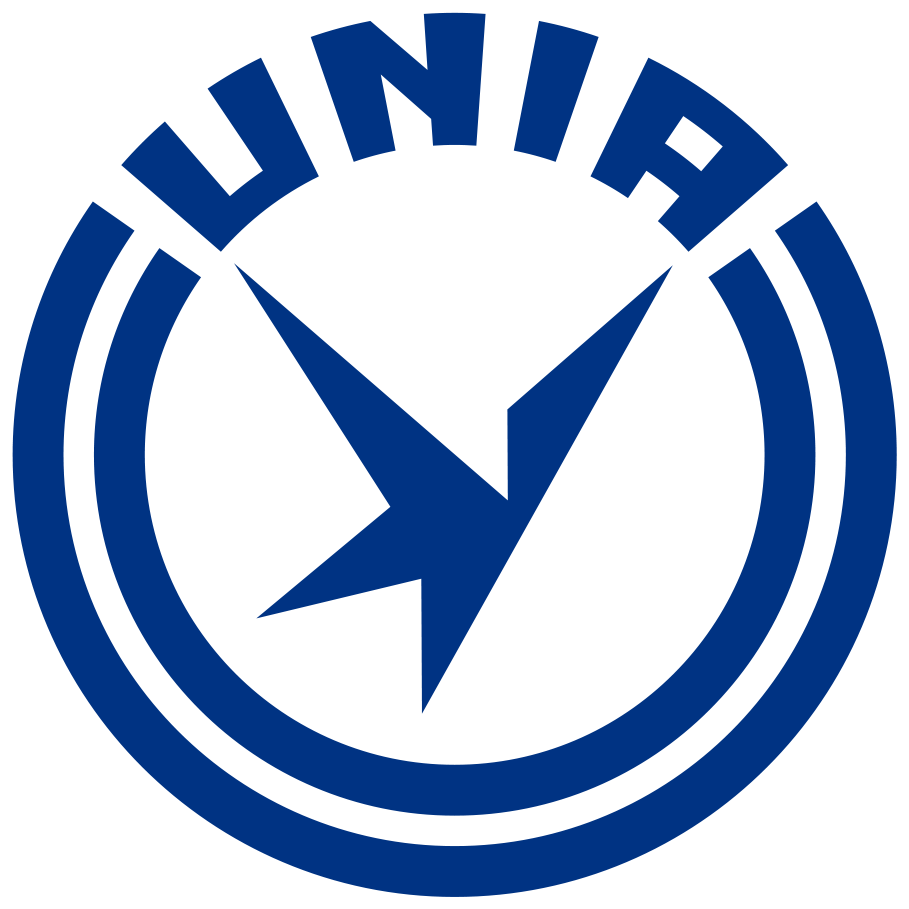
- Full name: Grupa Azoty Unia Tarnów
- Founded: 1960
- Arena: Arena Jaskółka Tarnów
- Capacity: 4,317
- President: Stanisław Piwowarski
- Head coach: Tomasz Strząbała
- League: Superliga
- 2021/22: 12th
- Club colours
Home	Away

Unia Tarnów, known as Grupa Azoty Unia Tarnów for sponsorship reasons, is a men's handball club from Tarnów, Poland, that plays in the Superliga. Between 1978-2010 the club was part of the Unia Tarnów sports club.

== Crest, colours, supporters ==
=== Kits ===
HOME
2023-24

AWAY
2023-24

THIRD
2023-24

== History ==
Historical names:

- MKS MDK Tarnów (1960–1973)
- MKS Pałac Młodzieży Tarnów (1973–1978)
- ZKS Unia Tarnów (1978–2010)
- SPR Tarnów (2010–2019)
- Grupa Azoty SPR Tarnów (2019–2021)
- Grupa Azoty Unia Tarnów (2021–)

== Team ==
=== Current squad ===
Squad for the 2023–24 season

Goalkeepers

- 12 (Poland) Paweł Kazimier
- 16 (Poland) Jakub Wysocki
- 21 (Poland) Patryk Małecki

Left wingers

- 23 (Poland) Michał Słupski
- 28 (Poland) Jakub Sikora

Right wingers

- 4 (Poland) Marcel Zdobylak
- 17 (Belarus) Aliaksandr Bushkou

Line players

- 15 (Poland) Korneliusz Małek
- 22 (Poland) Jakub Adamski

Left backs

- 9 (Poland) Paweł Podsiadło
- 39 (Poland) Przemysław Mrozowicz

Centre backs

- 5 (Poland) Konrad Wątroba
- 8 (Poland) Albert Sanek
- 25 (Ukraine) Vladyslav Parovinchak

Right backs

- 19 (Belarus) Dzmitry Smolikau
- 88 (Poland) Jakub Tokarz

=== Transfers ===
Transfers for the 2026–27 season

Joining

- (Poland) Albert Sanek (CB) from (Poland) Stal Mielec

Leaving

=== Transfer History ===
Transfers for the 2024–25 season

Joining

Leaving

- (Poland) Paweł Kazimier (GK) (to ?)
- (Poland) Patryk Małecki (GK) (to (Poland) Śląsk Wrocław)
- (Poland) Jakub Wysocki (GK) (to (Poland) Grunwald Poznań)
- (Poland) Jakub Sikora (LW) (to (Poland) Stal Mielec)
- (Poland) Michał Słupski (LW) (to (Poland) Zepter KPR Legionowo)
- (Poland) Przemysław Mrozowicz (LB) (to (Poland) Stal Mielec)
- (Poland) Paweł Podsiadło (LB) (to (Poland) Stal Mielec)
- (Ukraine) Vladyslav Parovinchak (CB) (to (Poland) Padwa Zamość)
- (Poland) Albert Sanek (CB) (to (Italy) Teamnetwork Albatro Siracusa)
- (Poland) Konrad Wątroba (CB) (to (Poland) Budimex Stal Gorzów)
- (Belarus) Dzmitry Smolikau (RB) (to (Poland) Arged Rebud KPR Ostrovia)
- (Poland) Jakub Tokarz (RB) (to (Poland) Stal Mielec)
- (Belarus) Aliaksandr Bushkou (RW) (to ?)
- (Poland) Marcel Zdobylak (RW) (to ?)
- (Poland) Jakub Adamski (P) (to (Poland) KGHM Chrobry Głogów)
- (Poland) Korneliusz Małek (P) (to ?)
