= Wiktor Tomczak =

Polish handball player (born 2002)

Personal information
- Nationality: Polish
- Born: 22 July 2002 (age 24) Wrocław, Poland
- Height: 2.00 m (6 ft 7 in)

Sport
- Sport: Handball
- Position: Right back
- Current club: Torus Wybrzeże Gdańsk
- Number: 30

Youth career
- Years: Team
- –2018: MKS MOS Wrocław
- 2018–2020: SMS Kielce

Senior clubs
- Years: Team
- 2020–2021: SMS Kielce
- 2021–2024: Barlinek Industria Kielce
- 2021–2024: → Torus Wybrzeże Gdańsk (loan)
- 2024-: PGE Wybrzeże Gdańsk
National team
Years	Team	Apps	(Gls)
2021–	Poland	10	(8)
- Updated on 16 January 2026

Wiktor Tomczak (born 22 July 2002) is a Polish handball player for PGE Wybrzeże Gdańsk and the Polish national team playing right back position.

== Professional Career ==
=== Clubs ===
1. SMS Kielce (2020-2021)
2. Barlinek Industria Kielce (2021)
3. PGE Wybrzeże Gdańsk (2021-2026) 3rd place at Polish Handball Championship 2026, 2nd place at Polish Handball Cup 2026

Wiktor is a member of PGE Wybrzeże Gdańsk since 2021, when he started as a loan from Barlinek Industria Kielce. As of 2026, his contract has been extended up until 2028.

=== National Team ===
Wiktor have been nominated for polish national teams since 2021. As of 2026 Wiktor is taking part in qualification games for 2028 EHF European Men's Handball Championship as a part of Polish National Team.
