= Michał Bartczak =

Polish handball player (born 1987)

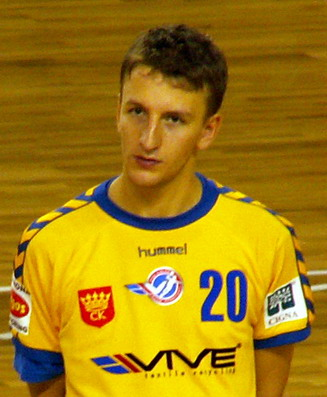

Personal information
- Nationality: Polish
- Born: 27 February 1987 (age 39) Pabianice, Poland
- Height: 1.93 m (6 ft 4 in)

Sport
- Sport: Handball
- Position: Right wing

Senior clubs
- Years: Team
- 2003–2005: ChKS Łódź
- 2005–2008: Vive Kielce
- 2008–2012: Warmia Olsztyn
- 2012–2017: Zagłębie Lubin
- 2017–2019: SPR Chrobry Głogów
National team
Years	Team	Apps	(Gls)
2012–	Poland	8	(13)

Michał Bartczak (born 27 February 1987) is a Polish handball player for the Polish national team. He is currently a free agent.

He participated at the 2013 World Men's Handball Championship.
