= Paweł Salacz =

Polish handball player (born 1997)

Personal information
- Nationality: Polish
- Born: 7 July 1997 (age 29) Brzeg, Poland
- Height: 2.07 m (6 ft 9 in)

Sport
- Sport: Handball
- Position: Pivot
- Current club: Slask Wroclaw
- Number: 33

Senior clubs
- Years: Team
- 2013–2016: SMS Gdańsk
- 2016–: Wybrzeże Gdańsk
- 2024–: Slask Wroclaw
National team
Years	Team	Apps	(Gls)
2018–	Poland	8	(7)

Paweł Salacz (born 7 July 1997) is a Polish handball player for Wybrzeże Gdańsk and the Polish national team.
