= Damian Krzysztofik =

Polish handball player (born 1988)

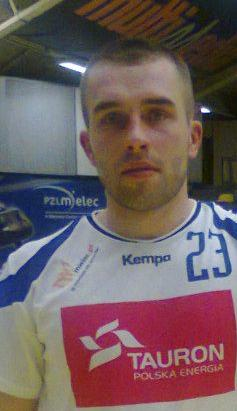

Personal information
- Nationality: Polish
- Born: 12 April 1988 (age 38) Mielec, Poland
- Height: 1.88 m (6 ft 2 in)

Sport
- Sport: Handball
- Position: Pivot
- Current club: Chrobry Głogów
- Number: 23
National team
Years	Team	Apps	(Gls)
2013–	Poland	3	(8)

Damian Krzysztofik (born 12 April 1988) is a Polish handball player for Chrobry Głogów and the Polish national team.
