= Śląsk Wrocław (handball) =

Polish handball club

WKS Śląsk Wrocław
- Full name: Wojskowy Klub Sportowy; Śląsk Wrocław
- Nickname: Wojskowi
- Founded: 1955; 71 years ago
- Arena: Hala Orbita
- Capacity: 3,000
- President: Bartłomiej Koprowski
- Head coach: Mateusz Jankowski & Bartłomiej Koprowski
- League: Polish Superliga
- Club colours
Home	Away

WKS Śląsk Wrocław is a professional men's handball club based in Wrocław in southwestern Poland, founded in 1955. They compete in the top flight of the Polish handball, Superliga. It is one of the most successful Polish handball clubs, having won 15 domestic league titles, although their last came more than 20 years ago.

== Crest, colours, supporters ==
=== Kits ===
HOME
2015–16	2024–25

== Honours ==
=== Domestic ===
- Polish Superliga

Winners (15): 1957–58, 1960–61, 1961–62, 1962–63, 1964–65, 1966–67, 1971–72, 1972–73, 1973–74, 1974–75, 1975–76, 1976–77, 1977–78, 1981–82, 1996–97

- Polish Cup

Winners (7): 1958–59, 1964–65, 1968–69, 1975–76, 1980–81, 1981–82, 1988–89

=== International ===
- EHF Champions League

Silver (1): 1977–78

== Team ==
=== Current squad ===
Squad for the 2025–26 season

Goalkeepers

- 11 (Poland) Marcin Dytko
- 12 (Poland) Marcin Młoczyński
- 16 (Poland) Bartosz Dudek
- 21 (Poland) Patryk Małecki

Left wingers

- 5 (Poland) Kacper Majewski
- 9 (Poland) Szymon Famulski
- 35 (Poland) Jakub Wielgucki

Right wingers

- 3 (Poland) Szymon Mucha
- 15 (Poland) Adrian Burtan
- 95 (Poland) Jarosław Cepielik

Line players

- 13 (Poland) Konrad Cegłowski
- 18 (Poland) Mateusz Jankowski
- 33 (Poland) Paweł Salacz
- 96 (Poland) Łukasz Królikowski

Left backs

- 8 (Poland) Wojciech Granowski
- 10 (Poland) Kacper Adamski
- 23 (Poland) Tomasz Kołodziejczyk

Centre backs

- 1 (Poland) Hubert Kornecki
- 24 (Poland) Krzysztof Gądek
- 31 (Poland) Kamil Ramiączek

Right backs

- 2 (Poland) Jakub Przybylski
- 53 (Ukraine) Bogdan Cherkashchenko

=== Transfers ===
Transfers for the 2026–27 season

Joining

- (Czech Republic) Alexandr Moješcik (CB) from (Czech Republic) SKKP Handball Brno
- (Poland) Marek Marciniak (RW) from (North Macedonia) RK Vardar

Leaving

=== Transfer History ===
Transfers for the 2025–26 season

Joining

- (Poland) Mateusz Góralski (RW) from (Poland) Wybrzeże Gdańsk
- (Poland) Patryk Niedzielenko (LB) from (Poland) Wybrzeże Gdańsk
- (Poland) Tyberiusz Chałupka (LP) from (Poland) MMTS Kwidzyn
- (Poland) Łukasz Mazur (GK) (from (Poland) Siódemka Miedź Huras Legnica)
- (Poland) Kacper Okapa (LW) (from (Poland) Padwa Zamość)
- (Ukraine) Vladyslav Parovinchak (CB) (from (Poland) Padwa Zamość)
- (Brazil) Ramon Oliveira (RB) (free agent)
- (Poland) Szymon Pacek (RB) (from (Poland) Siódemka Miedź Huras Legnica)
- (Poland) Mateusz Wychowaniec (RW) (from (Poland) Rebud KPR Ostrovia)
- (Poland) Jakub Świątkiewicz (P) (from (Poland) Nielba Wągrowiec)
- (Poland) Janusz Wandzel (LP) on loan from (Poland) Gwardia Opole

Leaving

- (Poland) Szymon Famulski (LW) (to (Poland) MKS Wieluń)
- (Poland) Kacper Majewski (LW) (to (Poland) Siódemka Miedź Huras Legnica)
- (Poland) Tomasz Kołodziejczyk (LB) (to (Poland) Energa MKS Kalisz)
- (Poland) Krzysztof Gądek (CB) (to (Japan) Golden Wolves Fukuoka)
- (Poland) Hubert Kornecki (CB) (to (Germany) HG Saarlouis)
- (Poland) Kamil Ramiączek (CB) (to ?)
- (Ukraine) Bogdan Cherkashchenko (RB) (to ?)
- (Poland) Adrian Burtan (RW) (to (Poland) Nielba Wągrowiec)
- (Poland) Jarosław Cepielik (RW) (to ?)
- (Poland) Szymon Mucha (RW) (to (Poland) Energa MMTS Kwidzyn)
- (Poland) Mateusz Jankowski (P) (retires)
- (Poland) Łukasz Królikowski (P) (to ?)
