= Handball in Poland =

Handball is a popular team sport in Poland.

- Superliga
- Ekstraklasa
- Poland men's national handball team
- Poland women's national handball team

== See also ==
- Sports in Poland
