= KPR Legionowo =

Polish handball club

Zepter KPR Legionowo
- Full name: Zepter Klub Piłki Ręcznej Legionowo
- Founded: 2009
- Arena: Arena Legionowo
- Capacity: 1,998
- President: Dominik Brinovec
- Head coach: Michał Prątnicki
- League: Orlen Superliga
- 2022–23: Liga Centralna, 1st (promoted)
- Club colours
Home	Away

KPR Legionowo, known as Zepter KPR Legionowo for sponsorship reasons, is a men's handball club from Legionowo, Poland. It plays in the Orlen Superliga.

== Crest, colours, supporters ==
=== Kits ===
HOME

2023–24

HOME

2024–25

== History ==
Historical names:

- KPR Legionowo (2009–2023)
- Zepter KPR Legionowo (2023–)

== Team ==
=== Current squad ===
Squad for the 2025–26 season

Goalkeepers

- 1 (Poland) Sebastian Pieńkowski
- 21 (Sweden) Casper Liljestrand
- (Georgia (country)) Zurab Tsintsadze

Left wingers

- 3 (Poland) Jakub Brzeziński
- 24 (Slovenia) Franci Brinovec
- (Poland) Szymon Wiaderny

Right wingers

- (Poland) Mateusz Kosmala
- (Poland) Maciej Stawicki

Line players

- 15 (Poland) Damian Pawelec
- 18 (Poland) Sławomir Lewandowski
- (Ukraine) Serhii Petrychenko

Left backs

- 13 (Poland) Filip Fąfara
- 23 (Poland) Krzysztof Tylutki
- 41 (Poland) Krystian Wołowiec
- (Poland) Jakub Pinda

Centre backs

- 42 (Poland) Dawid Petlak
- 44 (Poland) Mateusz Chabior
- 55 (Poland) Adam Laskowski
- 77 (Poland) Kamil Ciok

Right backs

- (Poland) Krzysztof Jagielski
- (Poland) Wojciech Matuszak

=== Transfers ===
Transfers for the 2026–27 season

Joining

- (Ukraine) Dmytro Ilchenko (LP) from (Poland) Górnik Zabrze
- (Poland) Mateusz Drozdalski (CB) from (Poland) Zagłębie Lubin
- (Poland) Paweł Kałużny (LP) from (Poland) Zagłębie Lubin
- (Poland) Ignacy Jaworski (LP) from (Poland) KS Azoty-Puławy
- (Poland) Jan Antolak (LB) from (Poland) KS Azoty-Puławy

Leaving

- (Slovenia) Maj Jelen (LP) to (Slovenia) RK Maribor Branik
- (Poland) Jakub Brzeziński (LW) (retires)
- (Poland) Mateusz Chabior (CB) to (Poland) MKS Kalisz
- (Poland) Sławomir Lewandowski (LP) to (Poland) KS Warszawianka

=== Transfer History ===
Transfers for the 2025–26 season

Joining

- (Georgia (country)) Zurab Tsintsadze (GK) from (Poland) KS Azoty-Puławy
- (Poland) Mateusz Kosmala (RW) from (Poland) Energa MMTS Kwidzyn
- (Poland) Wojciech Matuszak (RB) from (Poland) SPR Chrobry Głogów
- (Poland) Szymon Wiaderny (LW) (from (Poland) Industria Kielce)
- (Poland) Jakub Pinda (LB) (from (Poland) Górnik Zabrze)
- (Poland) Krzysztof Jagielski (RB) (from (Poland) KPR Fit Dieta Żukowo)
- (Poland) Maciej Stawicki (RW) (from (Poland) SMS ZPRP Płock)
- (Ukraine) Serhii Petrychenko (P) (from (Austria) Bregenz Handball)
- (Slovenia) Maj Jelen (LP) from (Slovenia) RK Celje

Leaving

- (Poland) Michał Klapka (RW) to (Poland) Pogoń Szczecin
- (Poland) Dawid Balcerek (GK) to (Poland) Gwardia Opole
- (Poland) Eliasz Kapela (LP) to (Poland) Nielba Wągrowiec
- (Poland) Michał Słupski (LW) (to ?)
- (Poland) Kamil Adamczyk (RB) (to ?)
- (Poland) Norbert Maksymczuk (RW) (to ?)
