= Pogoń Szczecin (men's handball) =

Sandra SPA Pogoń Szczecin
- Full name: Sandra SPA Pogoń Szczecin
- Founded: 2007
- Arena: Arena Szczecin
- Capacity: 5,403
- President: Paweł Biały
- Head coach: Rafał Biały
- League: Superliga
- 2021/22: 13th
- Club colours
Home	Away

Sandra SPA Pogoń Szczecin is a men's handball club from Szczecin, Poland, that plays in the Superliga.

== Crest, colours, supporters ==
=== Kits ===
HOME
2016-17	2017–21

AWAY

2017–18

== European record ==
=== EHF Cup ===
Season	Competition	Round	Club	1st leg	2nd leg	Aggregate
2015–16	EHF Cup	R2	(Hungary) Csurgói KK	19–29	27–30	46–59

== Team ==
=== Current squad ===
Squad for the 2022–23 season

Goalkeepers

- 22 (Poland) Grzegorz Jagodziński
- 27 (Serbia) Luka Arsenić
- 28 (Ukraine) Maksym Viunik

Left wingers

- 23 (Poland) Dawid Krysiak
- 24 (Poland) Grzegorz Nowak

Right wingers

- 5 (Poland) Patryk Krok
- 26 (Poland) Krzysztof Mitruczuk

Line players

- 7 (Poland) Eliasz Kapela

Left backs

- 6 (Poland) Filip Wrzesiński
- 11 (Poland) Paweł Krupa
- 14 (Poland) Hubert Wiśniewski

Centre backs

- 9 (Ukraine) Vladyslav Zalevskyi
- 15 (Croatia) Matija Starčević

Right backs

- 17 (Ukraine) Bogdan Cherkashchenko
- 99 (Poland) Jakub Polok

=== Technical staff ===
- Head coach: (Poland) Rafał Biały

=== Transfers ===
Transfers for the 2025–26 season

Joining

- (Poland) Michał Klapka (RW) from (Poland) KPR Legionowo

Leaving

- (Poland) Patryk Krok (RW) to (Poland) KPR Ostrovia

=== Transfer History ===
Transfers for the 2022–23 season

Joining

- (Poland) Krzysztof Mitruczuk (RW) (from (Poland) SMS Płock)

Leaving

- (Poland) Tomasz Wiśniewski (GK) (to (Poland) Stal Mielec)
- (Poland) Łukasz Gierak (CB) (to (Poland) ARGED KPR Ostrovia)
- (Poland) Mateusz Zaremba (RB) (retires)
- (Poland) Wojciech Jedziniak (RW) (retires)
- (Poland) Arkadiusz Bosy (P) (retires)
- (Poland) Adam Wąsowski (P) (to (Poland) Górnik Zabrze)
