= Dawid Przysiek =

Polish handball player (born 1987)

Personal information
- Nationality: Polish
- Born: 4 February 1987 (age 39) Wągrowiec, Poland
- Height: 1.86 m (6 ft 1 in)

Sport
- Sport: Handball
- Position: Centre back
- Current club: Arka Gdynia
- Number: 7

Senior clubs
- Years: Team
- 2002–2004: MKS Nielba Wągrowiec
- 2004–2005: Sparta Oborniki
- 2005–2012: MKS Nielba Wągrowiec
- 2012–2018: Zagłębie Lubin
- 2018–2019: Arka Gdynia
- 2019–: Chrobry Głogów
National team
Years	Team	Apps	(Gls)
2010–	Poland	3	(12)

Dawid Przysiek (born 4 February 1987) is a Polish handball player for Arka Gdynia and the Polish national team.
