= Stanisław Makowiejew =

Polish handball player (born 1991)

Personal information
- Nationality: Polish
- Born: 17 May 1991 (age 35) Tiraspol, Soviet Union
- Height: 1.90 m (6 ft 3 in)

Sport
- Sport: Handball
- Position: Central back
- Current club: SRS Orlen Upstream Przemyśl
- Number: 71
National team
Years	Team	Apps	(Gls)
2017–	Poland	7	(5)

Stanisław Makowiejew (born 17 May 1991) is a Polish handball player for Energa MKS Kalisz and the Polish national team.
