= Zagłębie Lubin (men's handball) =

Polish handball club

MKS Zagłębie Lubin
- Full name: Miejski Klub Sportowy Zagłębie Lubin
- Founded: 1967; 59 years ago
- Arena: Hala RCS
- Capacity: 3,714
- President: Witold Kulesza
- Head coach: Jarosław Hipner
- League: Polish Superliga
- Club colours
Home	Away

MKS Zagłębie Lubin is a men's handball club from Lubin, Poland, that plays in the Superliga.

Location of Zagłębie Lubin

== History ==
The club was founded in 1967 under the name Górnik Lubin. Their first coach was Szymon Kanigowski. The team reached the Polish top division for the first time at the end of the 1990/1991 season, already under the name Zagłębie Lubin. Two years later, the team won the Polish Cup in the 1992/1993 season, defeating SPR Chrobry Głogów and Wybrzeże Gdańsk in the final four and drawing with KS Warszawianka. In the 1993/1994 season, the team debuted on the international cup circuit, when they were eliminated in the first round against Extran Beyne of Belgium in the EHF Cup Winners' Cup.

In the 2004/2005 season, the team won the league title for the first time in its history, beating Wisła Płock in the final match (27-23; 37-32; 43-42). The team finished the following season in third place. In the 2006/2007 season, the team reached the semi-finals of the EHF Challenge Cup, where it was eliminated by the Romanian UCM Resita. In the 2007/2008 season, they reached the final of the league again, but this time Wisła Płock proved to be better in the duel. The team was in the Polish Cup finals in 2009 and 2010, but lost both times to Vive Kielce. In the years that followed, the team ended most seasons in the middle of the league.

== Crest, colours, supporters ==
=== Kit manufacturers ===
Period	Kit manufacturer
2013	(Denmark) Hummel
2013–present	(Germany) Adidas

=== Kits ===
HOME

2013–14

AWAY
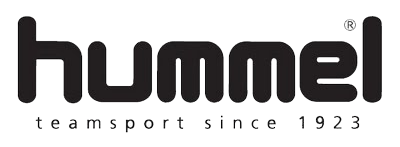
2012–13

== Management ==
Position	Name
President	(Poland) Witold Kulesza
Chairman of the Supervisory Board	(Poland) Adam Dworaczek
Member of the Supervisory Board	(Poland) Piotr Pater
Member of the Supervisory Board	(Poland) Wojciech Szolc

== Team ==
=== Current squad ===
Squad for the 2025–26 season

Goalkeepers

- 12 (Poland) Miłosz Byczek
- 16 (Poland) Miłosz Krukiewicz
- 44 (Poland) Marcin Schodowski

Left wingers

- 13 (Poland) Dawid Krysiak
- 14 (Poland) Jan Czuwara

Right wingers

- 19 (Poland) Arkadiusz Michalak
- 57 (Poland) Wojciech Kozłowski

Line players

- 7 (Poland) Kamil Pedryc
- 20 (Poland) Tomasz Pietruszko
- 45 (Poland) Paweł Kałuźny

Left backs

- 10 (Poland) Stanisław Gębala
- 11 (Poland) Paweł Krupa

Centre backs

- 23 (Poland) Mateusz Drozdalski
- 30 (Poland) Patryk Pulit
- (Poland) Michał Wojtała

Right backs

- 31 (Poland) Patryk Iskra
- 33 (Poland) Paweł Dudkowski

=== Transfers ===
Transfers for the 2026–27 season

Joining

Leaving

- (Poland) Paweł Dudkowski (RB) to (Poland) Piotrkowianin Piotrków Trybunalski
- (Poland) Mateusz Drozdalski (CB) to (Poland) KPR Legionowo
- (Poland) Paweł Kałużny (LP) to (Poland) KPR Legionowo

=== Transfer History ===
Transfers for the 2025–26 season

Joining

- (Poland) Michał Wojtała (CB) (from (Poland) Siódemka Miedź Huras Legnica)

Leaving

- (Poland) Filip Jarosz (LB) (end of loan (Poland) Energa MMTS Kwidzyn)
- (Poland) Maciej Markowski (CB) (to ?)
- (Poland) Bartosz Sarnowski (CB) (to ?)

== Honours ==
- Polish Superliga:
  - Gold (1): 2007
  - Silver (2): 2005, 2008
  - Bronze (1): 2006
- Polish Cup:
  - Gold (1): 1993
  - Silver (2): 2009, 2010
  - Bronze (3): 2007, 2008, 2021

=== Individual awards ===
==== Domestic ====
Polish Superliga Top Scorer

Season	Name	Goals
2003–04	(Poland) Michał Kubisztal	223
2004–05	(Poland) Michał Kubisztal	188
2006–07	(Poland) Michał Kubisztal	222
2017–18	(Poland) Arkadiusz Moryto	217

== European record ==
=== EHF Challenge Cup ===
Season	Round	Club	Home	Away	Aggregate
2006–07	Round 3	(Italy) Pallamano Prato	32–30	41–23	73–53
2006–07	Round 4	(Greece) A.C. Doukas School	40–25	37–36	77–61
2006–07	Quarter-finals	(Bosnia and Herzegovina) RK Konjuh Živinice	34–33	36–29	70–62
2006–07	Semi-finals	(Romania) UCM Resita	36–37	32–32	68–69

=== EHF ranking ===
As of 5 December 2024

Rank	Team	Points
274	(Slovakia) HC Sporta Hlohovec	2
275	(Poland) Piotrkowianin Piotrków Trybunalski	2
276	(Moldova) PGU Tiraspol	2
277	(Poland) Zagłębie Lubin	2
278	(Hungary) NEKA	2
279	(Moldova) SSSCJRO-1 Tiraspol	2
280	(Russia) GK Permskie Medvedi	2

== Former club members ==
=== Notable former players ===
The list includes players who have played at least once for their national team or spent at least 10 years with the team.

==== Goalkeepers ====
- (Poland) Szymon Ligarzewski (2004–2007)
- (Poland) Adam Malcher (2005–2013)
- (Poland) Marcin Schodowski (2019–)
- (Poland) Jakub Skrzyniarz (2015–2019)
- (Ukraine) Yuriy Shamrylo (2014–2016)

==== Right wingers ====
- (Poland) Michał Bartczak (2012–2017)
- (Poland) Krystian Bondzior (2016–2019)
- (Poland) Arkadiusz Moryto (2016–2018)
- (Poland) Piotr Obrusiewicz (2005–2012)

==== Left wingers ====
- (Poland) Paweł Biały (2019–2020)
- (Poland) Jan Czuwara (2014–2018, 2023–)
- (Poland) Wojciech Gumiński (2011–2016)
- (Poland) Marcel Sroczyk (2018–2022)
- (Poland) Bartłomiej Tomczak (2004–2011)

==== Line players ====
- (Poland) Dawid Dawydzik (2017–2019)
- (Poland) Paweł Orzłowski (2009–2012)
- (Poland) Jarosław Paluch (2002–2005, 2011–2015)
- (Poland) Michał Stankiewicz (2004–2008, 2009–2024)
- (Poland) Bartosz Wuszter (2000–2002)

==== Left backs ====
- (Poland) Grzegorz Gowin (2002–2004, 2012–2013)
- (Poland) Mariusz Jurkiewicz (2001–2003)
- (Poland) Kamil Krieger (2015–2016)
- (Poland) Paweł Krupa (2023–)
- (Poland) Michał Kubisztal (2003–2007)
- (Bosnia and Herzegovina) Faruk Halilbegović (2014–2015)

==== Central backs ====
- (Poland) Bartłomiej Jaszka (2003–2007, 2017–2019)
- (Poland) Jakub Moryń (2018–2019, 2021–2024)
- (Poland) Dawid Przysiek (2012–2018)

==== Right backs ====
- (Poland) Piotr Adamczak (2007–2012)
- (Poland) Krzysztof Górniak (2007–2008)
- (Poland) Przemysław Zadura (2008–2009)
- (Ukraine) Roman Chychykalo (2018–2022)
- (Ukraine) Danylo Hlushak (2022–2024)
