= Polish Handball Cup =

- Most recent season or competition: 2025–26
- Sport: Handball
- Founded: 1959
- Administrator: Polish Handball Association
- Country: Poland
- Confederation: EHF
- Most recent champion: Wisła Płock (2025–26)
- Most titles: Iskra Kielce (18 titles)
- Broadcaster: TVP Sport

The Polish Handball Cup is an annual competition for handball clubs in Poland. It is overseen by the Polish Handball Federation (Polish: Związek Piłki Ręcznej w Polsce). The tournament was established in 1959 and takes place every year (with a few exceptions, not held in: 1961, 1962, 1963, 1964, 1967, 1974, 1975, 1991, 2020).

== Winners ==
- The complete list of the Polish cup winners since 1959:

- 1959 : Śląsk Wrocław (1)
- 1960 : Sparta Katowice (1)
- 1965 : Śląsk Wrocław (2)
- 1966 : Spójnia Gdańsk (1)
- 1968 : Spójnia Gdańsk (2)
- 1969 : Śląsk Wrocław (3)
- 1970 : Spójnia Gdańsk (3)
- 1971 : Stal Mielec (1)
- 1972 : Grunwald Poznań (1)
- 1973 : Anilana Łódź (1)
- 1976 : Śląsk Wrocław (4)
- 1977 : Anilana Łódź (2)
- 1978 : Hutnik Nowa Huta (1)
- 1979 : Grunwald Poznań (2)
- 1980 : Grunwald Poznań (3)
- 1981 : Śląsk Wrocław (5)
- 1982 : Śląsk Wrocław (6)
- 1983 : Hutnik Kraków (2)
- 1984 : Pogoń Zabrze (1)
- 1985 : Korona Kielce (1)
- 1986 : Hutnik Nowa Huta (3)
- 1987 : Pogoń Szczecin (1)
- 1988 : Pogoń Zabrze (2)
- 1989 : Śląsk Wrocław (7)
- 1990 : Pogoń Zabrze (3)
- 1992 : Wisła Płock (1)
- 1993 : Zagłębie Lubin (1)
- 1994 : KS Warszawianka (1)
- 1995 : Wisła Płock (2)
- 1996 : Wisła Płock (3)
- 1997 : Wisła Płock (4)
- 1998 : Wisła Płock (5)
- 1999 : Wisła Płock (6)
- 2000 : Iskra Kielce (2)
- 2001 : Wisła Płock (7)
- 2002 : KS Warszawianka (2)
- 2003 : Vive Kielce (3)
- 2004 : Vive Kielce (4)
- 2005 : Wisła Płock (8)
- 2006 : Vive Kielce (5)
- 2007 : Wisła Płock (9)
- 2008 : Wisła Płock (10)
- 2009 : Vive Kielce (6)
- 2010 : Vive Targi Kielce (7)
- 2011 : Vive Targi Kielce (8)
- 2012 : Vive Targi Kielce (9)
- 2013 : Vive Targi Kielce (10)
- 2014 : Vive Targi Kielce (11)
- 2015 : Vive Tauron Kielce (12)
- 2016 : Vive Tauron Kielce (13)
- 2017 : Vive Tauron Kielce (14)
- 2018 : PGE Vive Kielce (15)
- 2019 : PGE Vive Kielce (16)
- 2021 : Łomża Vive Kielce (17)
- 2022 : Orlen Wisła Płock (11)
- 2023 : Orlen Wisła Płock (12)
- 2024 : Orlen Wisła Płock (13)
- 2025 : Industria Kielce (18)
- 2026 : Orlen Wisła Płock (14)

== Total titles won ==
Club	Titles	Years
Iskra Kielce	18	1985, 2000, 2003, 2004, 2006, 2009, 2010, 2011, 2012, 2013, 2014, 2015, 2016, 2017, 2018, 2019, 2021, 2025
Wisła Płock	14	1992, 1995, 1996, 1997, 1998, 1999, 2001, 2005, 2007, 2008, 2022, 2023, 2024, 2026
Śląsk Wrocław	7	1959, 1965, 1969, 1976, 1981, 1982, 1989
Spójnia Gdańsk	3	1966, 1968, 1970
Grunwald Poznań	3	1972, 1979, 1980
Hutnik Nowa Huta	3	1978, 1983, 1986
Pogoń Zabrze	3	1984, 1988, 1990
Anilana Łódź	2	1973, 1977
KS Warszawianka	2	1994, 2002
Sparta Katowice	1	1960
Stal Mielec	1	1971
Pogoń Szczecin	1	1987
Zagłębie Lubin	1	1993

== See also ==
- Polish Superliga
