= Paweł Krupa =

Polish handball player (born 1989)

Personal information
- Nationality: Polish
- Born: 24 October 1989 (age 36) Szczecin, Poland
- Height: 1.97 m (6 ft 6 in)

Sport
- Sport: Handball
- Position: Left back
- Current club: Pogoń Szczecin
- Number: 11

Senior clubs
- Years: Team
- 2007–: Pogoń Szczecin
National team
Years	Team	Apps	(Gls)
2018–	Poland	4	(2)

Paweł Krupa (born 24 October 1989) is a Polish handball player for Pogoń Szczecin and the Polish national team.
