= SPR Chrobry Głogów =

Polish handball club

- Full name: Stowarzyszenie Piłki Ręcznej Chrobry Głogów
- Founded: 1961
- Arena: HWS im. Ryszarda Matuszaka
- Capacity: 1,300
- President: Katarzyna Zygier
- Head coach: Vitaliy Nat
- League: Superliga
- 2021/22: 8th
- Club colours
Home	Away

SPR Chrobry Głogów is a men's handball club from Głogów, Poland, that plays in the Superliga.

Location of Chrobry Głogów

== History ==
In 1961, thanks to Henryk Tryka and Ryszard Matuszak, the handball era began in Głogów. In 1968, the team was promoted to the second division. In 1973, the team coached by Ryszard Matuszak achieved third place in the second league. Before long, Chrobry was relegated from the second league and played in the Vojvodina Inter-League to get promoted to the second league again, but for a longer period. The 2005/2006 season is a historic event for the club and the city of Głogów. The team finished second in the first division after losing the race for gold to multiple Polish champions Wisła Płock after dramatic matches. The players who won the silver medal: Bartosz Jurecki (captain), Paweł Piwko, Krystian Kuta, Wojciech Łuczyk, Michał Jurecki, Marek Świtała, Adrian Marciniak, Grzegorz Piotrowski, Sebastian Różański, Jacek Wolski, Kazimir Kotlinski, Mikołaj Szymyślik, Przemysław Pitoń, Tomasz Boruszewski, Jan Rak and Mieszko Nyćkowiak. The coach is Jarosław Cieślikowski. After the season, the Jurecki brothers, who were the team's main strengths for three seasons, will leave the club. Bartosz moved to SC Magdeburg, Michał to Vive Kielce. In the 2006/2007 season, the team finished 6th in the league.

== Crest, colours, supporters ==
=== Kits ===
HOME

2017–18

AWAY
2016–17	2017–18	2019–20

== Management ==
Position	Name
President	(Poland) Katarzyna Zygier
Member Of The Board	(Poland) Leszek Kroczak
Member Of The Board	(Poland) Marcin Sobuś
Member Of The Board	(Poland) Karolina Likus-Drozdel

== Team ==
=== Current squad ===
Squad for the 2025–26 season

Goalkeepers

- 1 (Poland) Rafał Stachera
- 22 (Ukraine) Anton Dereviankin

Left wingers

- 3 (Poland) Kacper Grabowski
- 27 (Poland) Wojciech Styrcz

Right wingers

- 13 (Poland) Tomasz Kosznik
- (Croatia) Matija Car

Line players

- 17 (Poland) Jakub Orpik
- 23 (Poland) Jakub Adamski
- 78 (Poland) Bartosz Skiba

Left backs

- 4 (Ukraine) Maxym Strelnikov
- 9 (Poland) Jędrzej Zieniewicz
- 33 (Poland) Kamil Mosiołek

Centre backs

- 6 (Poland) Filip Wrona
- 20 (Poland) Wojciech Dadej
- 35 (Poland) Paweł Paterek

Right backs

- (Ukraine) Maksym Pavlovskyi
- (Poland) Krzysztof Żyszkiewicz

=== Transfers ===
Transfers for the 2026–27 season

Joining

- (Poland) Krzysztof Komarzewski (RW) from (Poland) KS Azoty-Puławy
- (Poland) Jan Stolarski (RB) from (Poland) Piotrkowianin Piotrków Trybunalski

Leaving

=== Transfer History ===
Transfers for the 2025–26 season

Joining

- (Poland) Krzysztof Żyszkiewicz (RB) from (Poland) Piotrkowianin Piotrków Trybunalski
- (Ukraine) Maksym Pavlovskyi (RB) (from (Germany) HSC 2000 Coburg)
- (Croatia) Matija Car (RW) (from (Austria) HC Linz AG)

Leaving

- (Poland) Wojciech Matuszak (RB) to (Poland) KPR Legionowo
- (Ukraine) Maksym Lobchuk (GK) (on loan to (Poland) Siódemka Miedź Huras Legnica)
- (Poland) Rafał Jamioł (RB) (to ?)
- (Poland) Wojciech Hajnos (RW) (to (Poland) UKS Świt Szaflary)

== Titles ==
- Superliga:
  - 2nd: 2006

== EHF ranking ==
As of 22/10/2026

Rank	Team	Points
87	(Estonia) Tallinna Mistra	52
88	(Israel) Handball Club Holon	52
89	(Luxembourg) Handball Esch	49
90	(Poland) SPR Chrobry Głogów	48
91	(Luxembourg) HB Dudelange	48
92	(Germany) TBV Lemgo	48
93	(Lithuania) VHC Šviesa	47

== Former club members ==
=== Notable former players ===
- (Poland) Adam Babicz (2014–2021)
- (Poland) Ignacy Bąk (2014–2016)
- (Poland) Michał Bartczak (2017–2019)
- (Poland) Daniel Grobelny (2001–2002)
- (Poland) Bartosz Jurecki (2002–2006, 2015–2016)
- (Poland) Michał Jurecki (2003–2006)
- (Poland) Damian Krzysztofik (2016–2022)
- (Poland) Maciej Kubisztal (2006–2008)
- (Poland) Jakub Łucak (2008–2015)
- (Poland) Stanisław Makowiejew (2018–2022)
- (Poland) Arkadiusz Miszka (2015–2017)
- (Poland) Paweł Piwko (2003–2008)
- (Poland) Dawid Przysiek (2019–2022)
- (Poland) Tomasz Rosiński (2015–2016)
- (Poland) Szymon Sićko (2016–2017)
- (Belarus) Kazimir Kotlinski (2003–2007)
- (Belarus) Anton Prakapenia (2013–2014)
- (Ukraine) Yevhen Buinenko (2020)
- (Ukraine) Oleksandr Tilte (2020–2021, 2022–)
