= Piotrkowianin Piotrków Trybunalski =

- Founded: 1997
- Arena: Hala Relax
- Capacity: 1,000
- President: Tomasz Zwierzchowski
- Head coach: Michał Matyjasik
- League: Superliga
- 2021/22: 7th
- Club colours
Home	Away

Piotrkowianin Piotrków Trybunalski is a men's handball club from Piotrków Trybunalski, Poland, that plays in the Superliga.

== Crest, colours, supporters ==
=== Kits ===
AWAY
2024–25

== Team ==
=== Current squad ===
Squad for the 2025–26 season

Goalkeepers

- 12 (Poland) Damian Chmurski
- 24 (Poland) Artur Kot
- 91 (Poland) Adrian Lewandowski

Left wingers

- 9 (Poland) Jakub Dróżdż
- 20 (Poland) Patryk Mastalerz

Right wingers

- 11 (Poland) Marcin Szopa
- (Poland) Adrian Trójniak

Line players

- 13 (Poland) Filip Wadowski
- 21 (Poland) Marcel Filipowicz
- 32 (Czech Republic) Roman Požárek
- 77 (Poland) Franciszek Jurczenia

Left backs

- 23 (Poland) Filip Surosz
- 95 (Poland) Piotr Rutkowski
- (Poland) Bartosz Gogola

Centre backs

- 6 (Poland) Krystian Krajewski
- 42 (Poland) Patryk Grzesik
- 71 (Poland) Stanisław Makowiejew

Right backs

- 8 (Poland) Jan Stolarski
- (Poland) Filip Wawrzyński

=== Transfers ===
Transfers for the 2026–27 season

Joining

- (Poland) Jakub Matlęga (GK) from (Italy) SSV Bozen Loacker
- (Poland) Paweł Dudkowski (RB) from (Poland) Zagłębie Lubin
- (Poland) Michał Bekisz (LB) from (Poland) MMTS Kwidzyn

Leaving

- (Poland) Jan Stolarski (RB) to (Poland) SPR Chrobry Głogów
- (Poland) Patryk Grzesik (CB) to (Poland) MMTS Kwidzyn

=== Transfer History ===
Transfers for the 2025–26 season

Joining

- (Poland) Bartosz Gogola (LB) (from (Poland) Olimpia MEDEX Piekary Śląskie)
- (Poland) Filip Wawrzyński (RB) (from (Poland) SMS ZPRP Płock)
- (Poland) Adrian Trójniak (RW) (from (Poland) Górnik II Zabrze)

Leaving

- (Poland) Krzysztof Żyszkiewicz (RB) to (Poland) SPR Chrobry Głogów
- (Poland) Paweł Kowalski (LB) (to ?)
- (Poland) Tomasz Wawrzyniak (CB) (to ?)
- (Poland) Marcin Matyjasik (RW) (to (Poland) KPR Fit Dieta Żukowo) ?

== See also ==
- Handball in Poland
- Sports in Poland
