= Polish Superliga =

Top men's handball league in Poland

- Current season, competition or edition: 2026–27 Superliga (men's handball)
- Sport: Handball
- Founded: 1956; 70 years ago
- First season: 1956–57
- President: Piotr Należyty
- Administrator: Polish Handball Association
- No. of teams: 12
- Country: Poland
- Confederation: EHF
- Most recent champion: Industria Kielce (21st title) (2025–26)
- Most titles: Iskra Kielce (21 titles)
- Broadcaster: Polsat Sport
- Streaming partner: Emocje.tv
- Sponsor: Lotto
- Relegation to: Liga Centralna
- Domestic cup: Polish Cup
- International cups: EHF Champions League; EHF European League; EHF European Cup
- Website: Orlen Superliga

The Polish Superliga, officially known as the Lotto Superliga due to its sponsorship by Lotto, is the top men's handball league in Poland. It is currently a 12 teams league, played from September to May.

The competition was founded in 1956 under the name I Liga and changed its name to Ekstraklasa in 1998. Since 2010, it is named Superliga.

== Champions ==
- The complete list of the Polish indoor handball champions since 1955:

Polish Handball Championship (1955 & 1956)

- 1955 : Sparta Katowice (1)
- 1956 : Sparta Katowice (2)

I Liga (1956–1998)

- 1957 : Sparta Katowice (3)
- 1958 : Śląsk Wrocław (1)
- 1959 : Sparta Katowice (4)
- 1960 : Sparta Katowice (5)
- 1961 : Śląsk Wrocław (2)
- 1962 : Śląsk Wrocław (3)
- 1963 : Śląsk Wrocław (4)
- 1964 : AZS Katowice (1)
- 1965 : Śląsk Wrocław (5)
- 1966 : Wybrzeże Gdańsk (1)
- 1967 : Śląsk Wrocław (6)
- 1968 : Spójnia Gdańsk (1)
- 1969 : Spójnia Gdańsk (2)
- 1970 : Spójnia Gdańsk (3)
- 1971 : Grunwald Poznań (1)
- 1972 : Śląsk Wrocław (7)
- 1973 : Śląsk Wrocław (8)
- 1974 : Śląsk Wrocław (9)
- 1975 : Śląsk Wrocław (10)
- 1976 : Śląsk Wrocław (11)
- 1977 : Śląsk Wrocław (12)
- 1978 : Śląsk Wrocław (13)
- 1979 : Hutnik Kraków (1)
- 1980 : Hutnik Kraków (2)
- 1981 : Hutnik Kraków (3)
- 1982 : Śląsk Wrocław (14)
- 1983 : Anilana Łódź (1)
- 1984 : Wybrzeże Gdańsk (2)
- 1985 : Wybrzeże Gdańsk (3)
- 1986 : Wybrzeże Gdańsk (4)
- 1987 : Wybrzeże Gdańsk (5)
- 1988 : Wybrzeże Gdańsk (6)
- 1989 : Pogoń Zabrze (1)
- 1990 : Pogoń Zabrze (2)
- 1991 : Wybrzeże Gdańsk (7)
- 1992 : Wybrzeże Gdańsk (8)
- 1993 : Iskra Kielce (1)
- 1994 : Iskra Kielce (2)
- 1995 : Wisła Płock (1)
- 1996 : Iskra Kielce (3)
- 1997 : Śląsk Wrocław (15)
- 1998 : Iskra Kielce (4)

Ekstraklasa (1998–2010)

- 1999 : Iskra Kielce (5)
- 2000 : Wybrzeże Gdańsk (9)
- 2001 : Wybrzeże Gdańsk (10)
- 2002 : Wisła Płock (2)
- 2003 : Vive Kielce (6)
- 2004 : Wisła Płock (3)
- 2005 : Wisła Płock (4)
- 2006 : Wisła Płock (5)
- 2007 : Zagłębie Lubin (1)
- 2008 : Wisła Płock (6)
- 2009 : Vive Kielce (7)
- 2010 : Vive Targi Kielce (8)

Superliga (2010–present)

- 2011 : Wisła Płock (7)
- 2012 : Vive Targi Kielce (9)
- 2013 : Vive Targi Kielce (10)
- 2014 : Vive Targi Kielce (11)
- 2015 : Vive Tauron Kielce (12)
- 2016 : Vive Tauron Kielce (13)
- 2017 : Vive Tauron Kielce (14)
- 2018 : PGE Vive Kielce (15)
- 2019 : PGE Vive Kielce (16)
- 2020 : PGE Vive Kielce (17)
- 2021 : Łomża Vive Kielce (18)
- 2022 : Łomża Vive Kielce (19)
- 2023 : Barlinek Industria Kielce (20)
- 2024 : Wisła Płock (8)
- 2025 : Wisła Płock (9)
- 2026 : Industria Kielce (21)

== Teams ==
Location of the 2026–27 Superliga teams.
- The following teams compete in the Superliga during the 2026–27 season:

	Team	Arena	Capacity
1	Industria Kielce	Hala Legionów	4,200
2	Wisła Płock	Orlen Arena	5,492
3	Wybrzeże Gdańsk	HWS AWFiS	1,700
4	Ostrovia Ostrów Wielkopolski	Arena Ostrów	2,500
5	MKS Kalisz	Arena Kalisz	3,164
6	Chrobry Głogów	HWS Głogów	2,500
7	MMTS Kwidzyn	KWS KCSiR	1,504
8	Stal Mielec	HSW MOSiR Mielec	3,056
9	KPR Legionowo	Arena Legionowo	1,998
10	Gwardia Opole	Stegu Arena	3,378
11	Piotrkowianin Piotrków Tryb.	Hala Relax	1,000
12	Śląsk Wrocław	Hala Orbita	2,418

== Total titles won ==
Club	Titles	Years
Iskra Kielce	21	1993, 1994, 1996, 1998, 1999, 2003, 2009, 2010, 2012, 2013, 2014, 2015, 2016, 2017, 2018, 2019, 2020, 2021, 2022, 2023, 2026
Śląsk Wrocław	15	1958, 1961, 1962, 1963, 1965, 1967, 1972, 1973, 1974, 1975, 1976, 1977, 1978, 1982, 1997
Wybrzeże Gdańsk	10	1966, 1984, 1985, 1986, 1987, 1988, 1991, 1992, 2000, 2001
Wisła Płock	9	1995, 2002, 2004, 2005, 2006, 2008, 2011, 2024, 2025
Sparta Katowice	3	1957, 1959, 1960
Spójnia Gdańsk	3	1968, 1969, 1970
Hutnik Kraków	3	1979, 1980, 1981
Pogoń Zabrze	2	1989, 1990
AZS Katowice	1	1964
Grunwald Poznań	1	1971
Anilana Łódź	1	1983
Zagłębie Lubin	1	2007

== EHF coefficients ==
The following data indicates Polish coefficient rankings between European handball leagues.

View source data.

Country ranking

EHF League Ranking as of the 2022–23 season:

- 4. (5) (Hungary) Nemzeti Bajnokság I (94.17)
- 5. (7) (Denmark) Danish Handball League (87.33)
- 6. (4) (North Macedonia) Macedonian Handball Super League (86.00)
- 7. (6) (Poland) Polish Superliga (80.67)
- 8. (8) (Portugal) Andebol 1 (79.67)

Club ranking

EHF Club Ranking as of 15 October 2025:

- 12. Industria Kielce (428)
- 14. Wisła Płock (386)
- 62. Górnik Zabrze (74)
- 68. Chrobry Glogow (69)
- 122. Ostrów Wielkopolski (32)
