= Stal Mielec (handball) =

Handball Stal Mielec
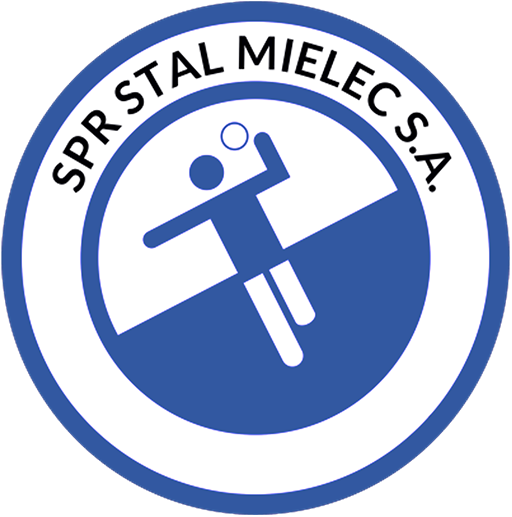
- Full name: Handball Stal Mielec
- Founded: 1952
- Arena: Hala SW MOSiR
- Capacity: 2,200
- President: Roman Kowalik
- Head coach: Marek Motyczyński
- League: Central League
- 2021/22: 14th (relegated)
- Club colours
Home	Away

Handball Stal Mielec is a men's handball club from Mielec, Poland, that plays in the Central League, having been relegated from the Superliga in 2022. It serves as the Stal Mielec's sports club section.

== Honours ==
- Polish Cup

Winners (1): 1970–71

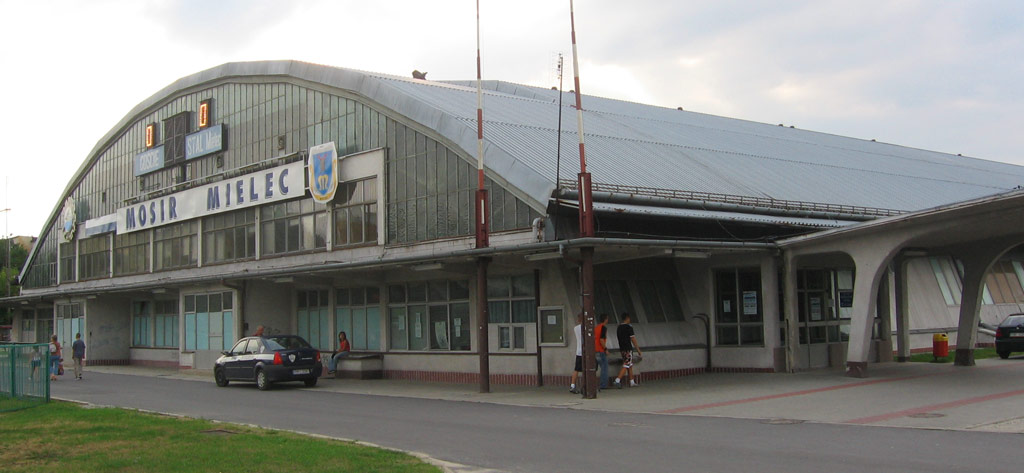
Hala sportowo-widowiskowa MOSiR

== Team ==
=== Current squad ===
Squad for the 2025–26 season

Goalkeepers

- 12 (Bosnia and Herzegovina) Željko Kozina
- 24 (Poland) Jędrzej Królikowski
- 99 (Poland) Krystian Witkowski

Left wingers

- 22 (Belarus) Maksim Krasouski
- 28 (Poland) Jakub Sikora
- 31 (Poland) Daniel Osmola

Right wingers

- 3 (Poland) Jakub Janus
- 25 (Poland) Filip Stefani

Line players

- 14 (Poland) Mikołaj Kotliński
- 89 (Poland) Adam Wąsowski
- 95 (Belarus) Aleh Tarasevich

Left backs

- 8 (Poland) Przemysław Mrozowicz
- 11 (Ukraine) Andrii Kasai
- 37 (Poland) Marcin Głuszczenko
- 38 (Bosnia and Herzegovina) Tarik Kasumović

Centre backs

- 15 (Poland) Jakub Tokarz
- 18 (Belarus) Dzianis Valyntsau
- 33 (Poland) Albert Sanek

Right backs

- 5 (Israel) Rotem Segal
- 19 (Poland) Rafał Przybylski

=== Transfers ===
Transfers for the 2026–27 season

Joining

- (Poland) Arkadiusz Ossowski (CB) from (Germany) HSC 2000 Coburg

Leaving

- (Poland) Albert Sanek (CB) to (Poland) Unia Tarnów
- (Poland) Krystian Marchewka (CB) loan back to (Poland) Wisła Płock

=== Transfer History ===
Transfers for the 2025–26 season

Joining

- (Israel) Rotem Segal (RB) from (France) Pau Billère Handball
- (Poland) Adam Wąsowski (LP) from (Poland) Górnik Zabrze
- (Poland) Krystian Witkowski (GK) from (Spain) BM Benidorm
- (Bosnia and Herzegovina) Željko Kozina (GK) (from (Slovenia) RK Celje)
- (Belarus) Maksim Krasouski (LW) (from (Belarus) HC Gomel)
- (Ukraine) Andrii Kasai (LB) (from (Germany) HSC 2000 Coburg)
- (Bosnia and Herzegovina) Tarik Kasumović (LB) (from (Slovenia) RD Riko Ribnica)
- (Poland) Albert Sanek (CB) (from (Italy) Teamnetwork Albatro Siracusa)
- (Poland) Rafał Przybylski (RB) (from (Belgium) Sezoens Achilles Bocholt)

Leaving

- (Poland) Dawid Dekarz (GK) to (Poland) Nielba Wągrowiec
- (Poland) Nikodem Błażejewski (GK) (end of loan (Poland) Industria Kielce)
- (Poland) Dawid Dekarz (GK) (to (Poland) Nielba Wągrowiec)
- (Poland) Igor Graczyk (LB) (to ?)
- (Poland) Paweł Podsiadło (LB) (to ?)
- (Poland) Dawid Ruhnke (RB) (to ?)
- (Poland) Szymon Światłowski (RB) (to (Poland) Olimpia MEDEX Piekary Śląskie))
- (Poland) Dawid Cacak (P) (on loan to (Poland) Azoty Puławy)
