= Wybrzeże Gdańsk (handball) =

Polish handball club

PGE Wybrzeże Gdańsk
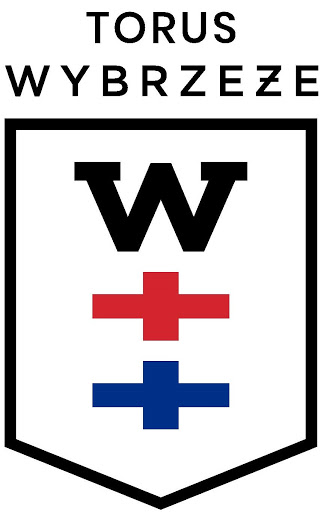
- Full name: Wybrzeże Gdańsk Handball Spółka Akcyjna
- Short name: Wybrzeże Gdańsk
- Founded: 1951; 75 years ago
- Arena: HWS Gdańsk
- Capacity: 1,700
- President: Jacek Pauba
- Head coach: Patryk Rombel
- Captain: Rafał Stępień
- League: Polish Superliga
- 2023–24: 11th place
- Club colours
Home	Away

Wybrzeże Gdańsk Handball SA, competing for sponsorship reasons as PGE Wybrzeże Gdańsk, is a professional men's handball club based in Gdańsk in northern Poland, founded in 1951, and competing in the Polish Superliga. The club celebrated its greatest successes during the 1980s, winning the domestic league 5 times and playing in the EHF Champions League final in 1986 and 1987.

== Crest, colours, supporters ==
=== Kits ===
HOME
2015–16	2019–20

AWAY
2016–17	2017–18	2018–20

== Honours ==
=== Domestic ===
- Polish Superliga

Winners (10): 1965–66, 1983–84, 1984–85, 1985–86, 1986–87, 1987–88, 1990–91, 1991–92, 1999–2000, 2000–01

=== International ===
- EHF Champions League

Silver (2): 1985–86, 1986–87

== Team ==
=== Current squad ===
Squad for the 2026–27 season

Goalkeepers

- 17 (Poland) Mateusz Zembrzycki
- 33 (Poland) Adam Zakrzewski
- 41 (Poland) Kornel Poźniak

Left wingers

- 31 (Poland) Mikołaj Rodak
- 44 (Poland) Mikołaj Czapliński

Right wingers

- 10 (Poland) Patryk Siekierka
- 87 (Poland) Filip Michałowicz

Line players

- 7 (Poland) Patryk Walczak
- 32 (Slovenia) Nejc Žmavc
- 40 (Iceland) Þorvaldur Örn Þorvaldsson

Left backs

- 9 (Poland) Rafał Stępień
- 42 (Poland) Jakub Będzikowski
- 48 (Poland) Tomasz Gębala

Centre backs

- 14 (Czech Republic) Lukáš Mořkovský
- 19 (Poland) Oskar Czertowicz
- 34 (Poland) Marcin Pepliński

Right backs

- 25 (Romania) Ionuț Stǎnescu
- 30 (Poland) Wiktor Tomczak

=== Transfers ===
Transfers for the 2026–27 season

Joining

- (Czech Republic) Lukáš Mořkovský (CB) from (Czech Republic) HC Zubří
- (Iceland) Thorvaldur Thorvaldsson (LP) from (Iceland) Valur
- (Poland) Patryk Walczak (LP) from (Croatia) RK Zagreb
- (Poland) Adam Zakrzewski (GK) (back from loan at (Poland) KPR Fit Dieta Żukowo)
- (Poland) Jakub Trzaskowski (RB) (from (Poland) SMS Kielce)

Leaving

- (Poland) Michał Peret (LP) to (Poland) ITS Jeziorak Iława
- (Poland) Maciej Papina (CB) to (Germany) HSG Krefeld
- (Poland) Damian Domagała (LP) to (Slovakia) HT Tatran Prešov
- (Poland) Jakub Trzaskowski (RB) (on loan to (Poland) NETLAND MKS Kalisz)
- (Poland) Jakub Waśkiewicz (P) (on loan to (Poland) MKS Piotrkowianin)

=== Transfer History ===
Transfers for the 2025–26 season

Joining

- (Poland) Tomasz Gębala (LB) from (Egypt) Al Ahly
- (Poland) Oskar Czertowicz (CB) from (Germany) SG Flensburg-Handewitt
- (Poland) Mikołaj Rodak (LW) (back from loan at (Poland) AZS AWF Biała Podlaska)
- (Poland) Filip Michałowicz (RW) (from (Poland) Orlen Wisła Płock)

Leaving

- (Poland) Piotr Papaj (LW) to (Poland) MMTS Kwidzyn
- (Poland) Mateusz Góralski (RW) to (Poland) Śląsk Wrocław
- (Poland) Patryk Niedzielenko (LB) to (Poland) Śląsk Wrocław
