= List of indoor arenas in Poland =

The following is a list of indoor arenas in Poland, ordered by capacity. The minimum required capacity is 1,000. The venues are by their final capacity after construction for seating-only events.

== Current arenas ==
Image	Stadium	Capacity	City	Team	Inaugurated
	Tauron Arena Kraków	15,030	Kraków	-	2014
	Atlas Arena	14,728	Łódź	-	2009
	Gliwice Arena	13,752	Gliwice	GTK Gliwice	2018
	Ergo Arena	11,409	Gdańsk and Sopot	Trefl Gdańsk; Atom Trefl Sopot; Trefl Sopot	2010
	Spodek	11,036	Katowice	-	1971
	Ice Arena Tomaszów Mazowiecki	11,000	Tomaszów Mazowiecki	Pilica Tomaszów Mazowiecki	2017
	Centennial Hall	10,000	Wrocław		1913
	Łuczniczka	8,764	Bydgoszcz	Astoria Bydgoszcz; Pałac Bydgoszcz	2002
	Hala MOSiR	6,710	Łódź	Organika Budowlani Łódź; ŁKS Łódź	1957
	Kujawsko-Pomorska Arena Toruń	6,248	Toruń	Pierniki Toruń	2014
	CRS Hall Zielona Góra	6,080	Zielona Góra	Basket Zielona Góra	2010
	Hala Sportowa Częstochowa	5,843	Częstochowa	KS Norwid Częstochowa	2012
	Hala Arena	5,500	Poznań		1974
	Polsat Plus Arena Gdynia	5,500	Gdynia	Asseco Gdynia	2008
	Hala Olivia	5,500	Gdańsk		1972
	Orlen Arena	5,467	Płock	Wisła Płock	2010
	Enea Arena	5,403	Szczecin	KPS Chemik Police; Pogoń Szczecin; Wilki Morskie Szczecin	2014
	Arena Gorzów	5,191	Gorzów Wielkopolski	AZS AJP Gorzów Wielkopolski; Cuprum Stilon Gorzów	2023
	Radomskie Centrum Sportu	5,029	Radom	Czarni Radom	2021
	Torwar Hall	4,824	Warsaw	Projekt Warsaw	1953
	Dębowiec Sports Arena	4,500	Bielsko-Biała	BKS Stal Bielsko-Biała	2010
	Arena Tarnów	4,317	Tarnów	SPR Tarnów; Unia Tarnów	2019
	Podpromie Hall	4,304	Rzeszów	Resovia Rzeszów	2002
	Hala Mistrzów	4,200	Włocławek	WTK Anwil Włocławek	2001
	Globus Hall	4,119	Lublin	KS Azoty-Puławy; SPR Lublin	2008
	Hala Legionów	4,100	Kielce	Effector Kielce; PGE Vive Kielce	2006
	Urania Hall	4,046	Olsztyn	Indykpol AZS Olsztyn; Warmia Olsztyn	1978
	Hala Widowiskowo Sportowa	4,000	Koszalin	AZS Koszalin	2012
	Hala KSZO	3,794	Ostrowiec Świętokrzyski	AZS KSZO Ostrowiec Świętokrzyski	2011
	Hala RCS	3,714	Lubin	MKS Zagłębie Lubin; Zagłębie Lubin	
	Arena Sosnowiec	3,502	Sosnowiec	Zagłębie Sosnowiec (women's basketball)	2023
	Miejska Hala Lodowa	3,500	Nowy Targ	Podhale Nowy Targ	1952
	PGE Turów Arena	3,500	Zgorzelec	Turów Zgorzelec	2014
	Stegu Arena	3,378	Opole	Gwardia Opole	1968
	Azoty Hall	3,375	Kędzierzyn-Koźle	ZAKSA Kędzierzyn-Koźle	2005
	Grupa Azoty Arena	3,164	Puławy	KS Azoty-Puławy	2006
	Arena Kalisz	3,164	Kalisz	Calisia Kalisz; Energa MKS Kalisz	2006
	Hala Widowiskowo-Sportowa w Jastrzębiu-Zdroju	3,007	Jastrzębie-Zdrój	Jastrzębski Węgiel	1971
	Arena Katowice	3,002	Katowice		2025
	Hala Sportowa w Mielcu	3,000	Mielec	Stal Mielec (handball); ITA TOOLS Stal Mielec	2023
	Arena Sanok	3,000	Sanok	KH Sanok	2006
	Hala Orbita	3,000	Wrocław	Śląsk Wrocław; WKS Śląsk Forza Wrocław	2004
	Hala Widowiskowo-Sportowa Aqua Zdrój	3,000	Wałbrzych	Górnik Wałbrzych; Koksownia Wałbrzych	2013
	Tor-Tor	2,997	Toruń	TKH Toruń	1960
	Hala Widowiskowo-Sportowa Centrum w Dąbrowie Górniczej	2,944	Dąbrowa Górnicza	MKS Dąbrowa Górnicza	2004
	Energia Hall	2,700	Bełchatów	PGE Skra Bełchatów	2006
	Arena Ostrów	2,600	Ostrów Wielkopolski	Stal Ostrów Wielkopolski	2020
	Stadion Zimowy	2,545	Sosnowiec	KH Zagłębie Sosnowiec	2023
	Będzin Arena	2,500	Będzin	MKS Będzin	2021
	HWS im. Ryszarda Matuszaka	2,500	Głogów	SPR Chrobry Głogów	
	Centrum Sportowo-Biznesowe w Elblągu	2,500	Elbląg	EB Start Elbląg	2006
	Hala Gryfia	2,454	Słupsk	Czarni Słupsk	1982
	Hala SW MOSiR	2,200	Mielec	KPSK Stal Mielec; SPR Stal Mielec	1963
	Suwałki Arena	2,165	Suwałki	Ślepsk Suwałki	2019
	Hala Znicz	2,097	Pruszków	MKS Znicz Basket Pruszków	2008
	Arena Ursynów	2,000	Warsaw		2007
	Legionowo Arena	1,998	Legionowo	Legionovia Legionowo Volleyball; Legion Legionowo; KPR Legionowo	2010
	Hala OSiR Bemowo	1,970	Warsaw	Legia Warsaw	1990
	Hala Polonia	1,950	Częstochowa	AZS Częstochowa; Tytan Częstochowa	1986
	Hala Stulecia Sopotu	1,942	Sopot		2001
	BGŻ Arena	1,800	Pruszków		2008
	Hala Widowiskowo-Sportowa MOSiR	1,777	Zabrze		1975
	HWS Gdańsk	1,700	Gdańsk	Wybrzeże Gdańsk	
	Grupa Moderator Arena	1,470	Bydgoszcz	Astoria Bydgoszcz; Artego Bydgoszcz	2014
	KWS KCSiR	1,504	Kwidzyn	MMTS Kwidzyn	2012
	Hala OSiR w Prudniku	1,600	Prudnik	Pogoń Prudnik; SPS Prudnik	1980
	Hala BKS Stal	1,400	Bielsko-Biała	BKS Stal Bielsko-Biała	1988
	Centrum Sportowe	1,300	Zgorzelec		1986
	Hala widowiskowo-sportowa w Tychach	1,250	Tychy	GKS Tychy; TKS Nascon Kopex Tychy	2008
	Hala sportowa Muszyna	1,200	Muszyna	Muszynianka Muszyna	
	Hala MOSIR w Radomiu	1,200	Radom	Rosa Radom	1979
	Hala MORiS w Chorzowie	1,100	Chorzów	Clearex Chorzów; KPR Ruch Chorzów	1982
	Hala ZSTiO w Gorzowie Wielkopolskim	1,100	Gorzów Wielkopolski	GTPS Gorzów Wielkopolski	1979
	Hala Dolnośląskich Olimpijczyków	1,000	Legnica	Miedź Legnica	1985
	Hala Relax	1,000	Piotrków Trybunalski	Piotrcovia Piotrków Trybunalski; Piotrkowianin Piotrków Trybunalski	1986
	Hala sportowa Pogoń Zabrze	1,000	Zabrze	NMC Górnik Zabrze	

== See also ==
- List of indoor arenas in Europe
- List of indoor arenas by capacity
- Lists of stadiums
