= MKS Kalisz =

Polish handball club

NETLAND MKS Kalisz
- Full name: NETLAND Miejski Klub Sportowy Kalisz
- Founded: 2007; 19 years ago
- Arena: Arena Kalisz
- Capacity: 3,164
- President: Błażej Wojtyła
- Head coach: Rafał Kuptel
- League: Polish Superliga
- Club colours

MKS Kalisz is a professional men's handball club from Kalisz, Poland, that plays in the Superliga.

The current name of the club is NETLAND MKS Kalisz due to sponsorship reasons.

Location of MKS Kalisz

== History ==
The club was founded in 2007 and was able to start in the second league. The Polish Handball Association expanded the first league on May 31, 2012, so the team started playing in the first league in the 2012/2013 season. In 2016, Bartłomiej Jaszka became the team's player coach. In the 2016/2017 season, the team won 21, drew one and lost four, finishing first in Division 1 Group B with 43 points. After winning the first league, the club management requested and received a license to play in the Superliga. MKS Kalisz debuted in the highest Polish league on September 2, 2017, losing at home to Vive Kielce (20:36). He achieved his first victory on September 17, 2017, defeating Stal Mielec at home (30:27). The team ended up in 7th place in the Superliga. The team's best result is 6th place, which it achieved several times.

== Crest, colours, supporters ==
=== Naming history ===
Name	Period
KPR Szczypiorno Kalisz	2007–2015
MKS Kalisz	2015–2018
Energa MKS Kalisz	2018–2025
NETLAND MKS Kalisz	2025–present

== Sports Hall information ==
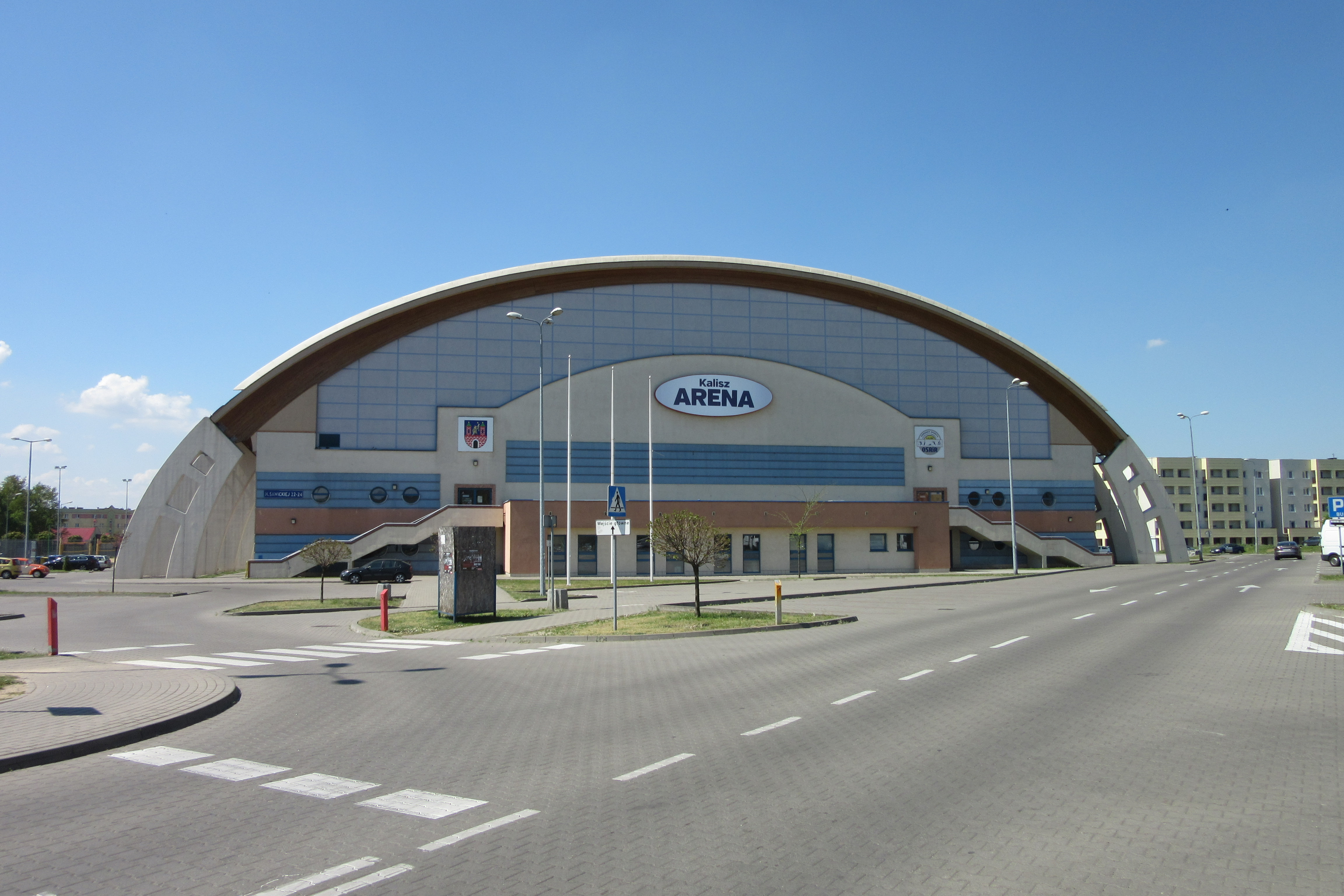
Home hall: Arena Kalisz

- Arena: - Arena Kalisz
- City: - Kalisz
- Capacity: - 3164
- Address: - Prymasa Stefana Wyszyńskiego 22-24, 62-800 Kalisz, Poland.

== Team ==
=== Current squad ===
Squad for the 2026–27 season

Goalkeepers

- 12 (Poland) Krzysztof Szczecina
- (Poland) Maciej Burzawa
- (Poland) Piotr Wyszomirski

Left wingers

- 26 (Poland) Dawid Molski
- 35 (Poland) Miłosz Bekisz

Right wingers

- 88 (Poland) Dawid Fedeńczak
- (Poland) Mateusz Nodzak

Line players

- 14 (Poland) Łukasz Kucharzyk
- (Poland) Jan Klimków

Left backs

- 5 (Croatia) Matija Starčević
- 72 (Portugal) Joel Ribeiro
- (Poland) Tomasz Kołodziejczyk

Centre backs

- 8 (Poland) Jakub Moryń
- (Ukraine) Rostyslav Polishchuk

Right backs

- 19 (Poland) Gracjan Wróbel
- (Poland) Mikołaj Białowąs

=== Transfers ===
Transfers for the 2026–27 season

Joining

- (Poland) Marcel Sroczyk (LW) from (Poland) Wisła Płock
- (Poland) Mateusz Chabior (CB) from (Poland) KPR Legionowo

Leaving

- (Portugal) Joel Ribeiro (CB) to (Poland) KPR Ostrovia Ostrów Wielkopolski

=== Transfer History ===
Transfers for the 2025–26 season

Joining

- (Poland) Piotr Wyszomirski (GK) from (Poland) Górnik Zabrze
- (Poland) Jan Klimków (LP) from (Croatia) RK Nexe Našice
- (Poland) Maciej Burzawa (GK) (from (Poland) Acana Moto-Jelcz Oława)
- (Poland) Tomasz Kołodziejczyk (LB) (from (Poland) Śląsk Wrocław)
- (Ukraine) Rostyslav Polishchuk (CB) (from (Germany) OHV Aurich)
- (Poland) Mikołaj Białowąs (RB) (from (Poland) Acana Moto-Jelcz Oława)
- (Poland) Mateusz Nodzak (RW) (from (Poland) KS Warszawianka)

Leaving

- (Czech Republic) Jan Hrdlička (GK) to (Germany) SG BBM Bietigheim
- (Ukraine) Vladyslav Dontsov (RB) to (Hungary) Carbonex-Komló
- (Poland) Bartosz Kowalczyk (LB) to (Poland) Gwardia Opole
- (Poland) Jacek Fajfer (CB) (on loan to (Poland) ENEA WKS Grunwald Poznań)
- (Poland) Michał Drej (RW) (retires)
- (Poland) Mateusz Kus (P) (retires) to (Germany) MT Melsungen

== Honours ==
=== Individual awards ===
==== Domestic ====
Polish Superliga Top Scorer

Season	Name	Goals
2021–22	(Poland) Kacper Adamski	162

== EHF ranking ==
As of 22/10/2026

Rank	Team	Points
132	(Austria) Handball Tirol	30
133	(Lithuania) Dragūnas Klaipėda	30
134	(Lithuania) Granitas Kaunas	30
135	(Poland) MKS Kalisz	29
136	(North Macedonia) Butel Skopje	28
137	(Italy) Pallamano Conversano	28
138	(Israel) Hapoel Rishon LeZion	28

== Former club members ==
=== Notable former players ===
The list includes players who have played at least once for their national team or spent at least 10 years with the team.

==== Goalkeepers ====
- (Poland) Krzysztof Szczecina (2022–)
- (Poland) Łukasz Zakreta (2017–2022)
- (Bosnia and Herzegovina) Edin Tatar (2017–2018)
- (Belarus) Artsem Padasinau (2018–2019)
- (Czech Republic) Jan Hrdlička (2022–)

==== Right wingers ====
- (Poland) Dawid Fedeńczak (2024–)
- (Poland) Krzysztof Komarzewski (2023–2024)

==== Left wingers ====
- (Poland) Bartłomiej Tomczak (2021–2022)

==== Line players ====
- (Poland) Mateusz Kus (2020–)
- (Poland) Zbigniew Kwiatkowski (2017–2020)
- (Belarus) Dzianis Krytski (2017–2020)

==== Left backs ====
- (Poland) Kacper Adamski (2020–2022)
- (Belarus) Kiryl Kniazeu (2017–2020)

==== Central backs ====
- (Poland) Bartłomiej Jaszka (2016–2017)
- (Poland) Bartosz Kowalczyk (2023–)
- (Poland) Stanisław Makowiejew (2020–2022)
- (Poland) Jakub Moryń (2024–)
- (Poland) Maciej Pilitowski (2018–2024)

==== Right backs ====
- (Poland) Piotr Adamczak (2018–2019)
- (Poland) Marek Szpera (2018–2022)
- (Ukraine) Vladyslav Dontsov (2024–)

=== Former coaches ===
Seasons	Coach	Country
2016–2017	Bartłomiej Jaszka	(Poland)
2017–2018	Paweł Rusek	(Poland)
2019–2020	Patrik Liljestrand	(Sweden)
2020–2021	Tomasz Strząbała	(Poland)
2021–2023	Paweł Noch	(Poland)
2023–	Rafał Kuptel	(Poland)
