= Adamuszek =

Adamuszek is a Polish-language surname. Notable people with the surname include:

- Jerzy Adamuszek, Polish geographer
- Michał Adamuszek (born 1986), Polish handball player
