= Kamil Krieger =

Polish handball player (born 1987)

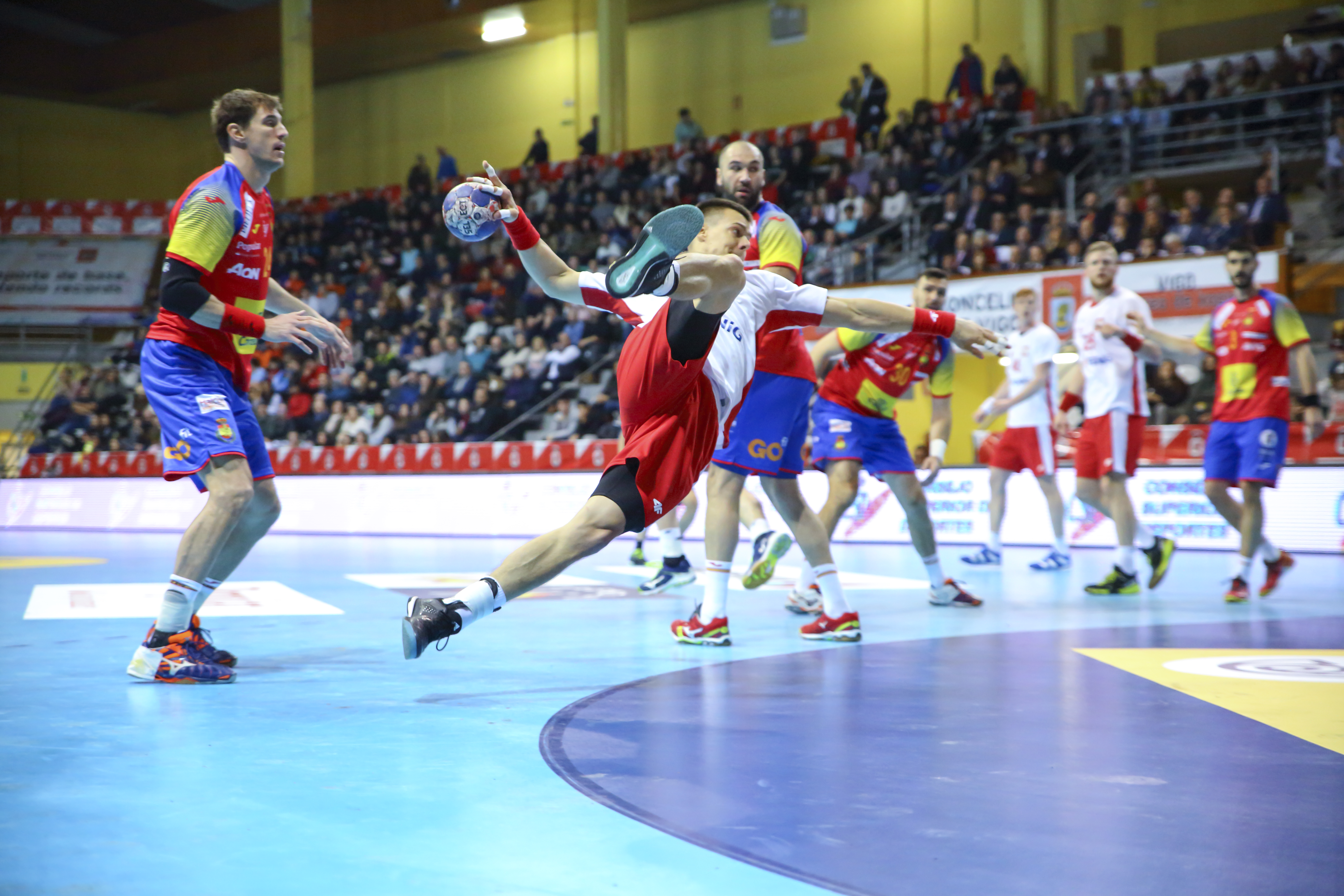

Personal information
- Nationality: Polish
- Born: 2 April 1987 (age 39) Kartuzy, Poland
- Height: 1.90 m (6 ft 3 in)

Sport
- Sport: Handball
- Position: Left back
- Current club: MMTS Kwidzyn
- Number: 7

Youth career
- Years: Team
- –2003: Cartusia Karzuty

Senior clubs
- Years: Team
- 2003–2006: SMS Gdańsk
- 2006–2008: MMTS Kwidzyn
- 2008–2011: Vive Kielce
- 2011–2012: MMTS Kwidzyn
- 2012–2015: Stal Mielec
- 2015–2016: Zagłębie Lubin
- 2016–: MMTS Kwidzyn
National team
Years	Team	Apps	(Gls)
2007–	Poland	18	(15)

Kamil Kriger (born 2 April 1987) is a Polish handball player for MMTS Kwidzyn and the Polish national team.

He competed at the 2010 European Men's Handball Championship.
