= Zadura =

Zadura is a surname. Notable people with this surname include:

- Bohdan Zadura (born 1945), Polish poet and translator
- Małgorzata Zadura (born 1982), Polish hammer thrower
- Przemysław Zadura (born 1988), Polish handball player
