= Paweł Genda =

Polish handball player (born 1994)

Personal information
- Nationality: Polish
- Born: 6 February 1994 (age 32) Ozimek, Poland
- Height: 1.98 m (6 ft 6 in)

Sport
- Sport: Handball
- Position: Left back

Senior clubs
- Years: Team
- 2010–2013: SMS Gdańsk
- 2013–2018: MMTS Kwidzyn
- 2018–2020: VfL Lübeck-Schwartau
National team
Years	Team	Apps	(Gls)
2017–2020	Poland	18	(24)

Paweł Genda (born 6 February 1994) is a former Polish handball player.
