= Patryk Mauer =

Polish handball player (born 1998)

Personal information
- Nationality: Polish
- Born: 2 September 1998 (age 28) Legnica, Poland
- Height: 1.80 m (5 ft 11 in)

Sport
- Sport: Handball
- Position: Right wing
- Current club: Górnik Zabrze
- Number: 21

Youth career
- Years: Team
- –2014: Dziewiątka Legnica

Senior clubs
- Years: Team
- 2014–2017: SMS Gdańsk
- 2017–2022: Gwardia Opole
- 2022-: Górnik Zabrze
National team
Years	Team	Apps	(Gls)
2017–	Poland	4	(1)

Patryk Mauer (born 2 September 1998) is a Polish handball player for Gwardia Opole and the Polish national team.
