= KPR Ostrovia Ostrów Wielkopolski =

Polish handball club

- Full name: Rebud Klub Piłki Ręcznej Ostrovia Ostrów Wielkopolski
- Nickname(s): Ovia, Pasiaki
- Short name: KPR Ostrovia
- Founded: 1996; 30 years ago
- Arena: Arena Ostrów
- Capacity: 2,600
- President: Jakub Kaszuba
- Head coach: Kim Rasmussen
- League: Polish Superliga
- Club colours
Home	Away

KPR Ostrovia Ostrów Wielkopolski is a men's handball club from Ostrów Wielkopolski, Poland, that plays in the Superliga.

The current name of the club is Rebud KPR Ostrovia Ostrów Wielkopolski due to sponsorship reasons.

Location of KPR Ostrovia Ostrów Wielkopolski

== History ==
The club was founded in November 1996. At the first general meeting on November 18, Mieczysław Mazurek was elected president. His first coach was Zbigniew Domagała. The team finished fourth in the second league in its first season. After the 2007/2008 season, the team won promotion to the first league. In the 2019/2020 season, the club won the first league, so they got the right to start the Polish Superliga. Unfortunately, the club did not meet the license conditions, so they were forced to stay in the first division. The team was promoted to the Polish Superliga at the end of the 2021/22 season.

== Crest, colours, supporters ==
=== Kits ===
HOME

2024–25

== Management ==
Position	Name
President	(Poland) Jakub Kaszuba
Vice President	(Poland) Karol Janoś
Sports Director	(Poland) Bartłomiej Tomczak
Member of the Supervisory Board	(Poland) Łukasz Kierzek
Member of the Supervisory Board	(Poland) Dominik Świątek

== Team ==
=== Current squad ===
Squad for the 2025–26 season

Goalkeepers

- 1 (Poland) Mikołaj Krekora
- 90 (Poland) Jakub Zimny
- 98 (Poland) Dawid Szymkowiak
- (Poland) Kacper Ligarzewski

Left wingers

- 6 (Poland) Przemysław Urbaniak
- 11 (Poland) Dawid Frankowski

Right wingers

- 9 (Poland) Artur Klopsteg
- (Poland) Patryk Krok

Line players

- 18 (Poland) Krzysztof Misiejuk
- 22 (Poland) Mateusz Wojciechowski
- (Ukraine) Ivan Burzak

Left backs

- 8 (Poland) Robert Kamyszek
- 68 (Poland) Ksawery Gajek

Centre backs

- 5 (Poland) Kamil Adamski
- 17 (Poland) Patryk Marciniak
- (Georgia (country)) Miriani Gavashelishvili

Right backs

- 23 (Belarus) Dzmitry Smolikau
- 29 (Poland) Marek Szpera

=== Transfers ===
Transfers for the 2026–27 season

Joining

- (Portugal) Diogo Valério (GK) from (Greece) Olympiacos
- (Portugal) Joel Ribeiro (CB) from (Poland) MKS Kalisz

Leaving

- (Poland) Kacper Ligarzewski (GK) to (Germany) HSG Nordhorn-Lingen

=== Transfer History ===
Transfers for the 2025–26 season

Joining

- (Ukraine) Ivan Burzak (LP) from (Romania) CS Minaur Baia Mare
- (Georgia (country)) Miriani Gavashelishvili (LB) from (Serbia) RK Metaloplastika
- (Poland) Kacper Ligarzewski (GK) from (Poland) Górnik Zabrze
- (Poland) Patryk Krok (RW) from (Poland) Pogoń Szczecin
- (Poland) Dawid Frankowski (LW) (from (Poland) SMS ZPRP Kwidzyn)

Leaving

- (Croatia) Sandro Meštrić (GK) loan back to (Poland) Industria Kielce
- (Czech Republic) Daniel Režnický (LP) to (Switzerland) Kadetten Schaffhausen
- (Poland) Krzysztof Łyżwa (CB) to (Poland) KS Azoty-Puławy
- (Poland) Bartłomiej Tomczak (LW) (retires)
- (Poland) Mateusz Wychowaniec (RW) (to (Poland) Śląsk Wrocław)
- (Poland) Filip Rybarczyk (RW) on loan at (Poland) Stal Gorzów)

== EHF ranking ==
As of 10/4/2026

Rank	Team	Points
126	(Serbia) RK Metaloplastika	35
127	(Czech Republic) HC ROBE Zubří	34
128	(Portugal) Águas Santas	34
129	(Poland) KPR Ostrovia Ostrów Wielkopolski	34
130	(Bosnia and Herzegovina) RK Sloga	33
131	(Switzerland) HSC Suhr Aarau	32
132	(Switzerland) GC Amicitia Zürich	32

== Former club members ==
=== Notable former players ===
The list includes players who have played at least once for their national team or spent at least 10 years with the team.

==== Left wingers ====
- (Poland) Bartłomiej Tomczak (2022–)
- (Poland) Przemysław Urbaniak (2022–)

==== Line players ====
- (Poland) Michał Stankiewicz (2024–)
- (Czech Republic) Daniel Režnický (2023–)

==== Left backs ====
- (Poland) Ksawery Gajek (2013–2018, 2020–)

==== Central backs ====
- (Poland) Łukasz Gierak (2022–2024)
- (Poland) Bartłomiej Jaszka (2000–2003)
- (Poland) Krzysztof Łyżwa (2007–2009, 2015–2016, 2023–)

==== Right backs ====
- (Poland) Krzysztof Lijewski (2000–2002)
- (Poland) Marek Szpera (2006–2009, 2022–)

=== Former coaches ===
Seasons	Coach	Country
2024–	Kim Rasmussen	(Denmark)
