= Michał Potoczny =

Polish handball player (born 1995)

Personal information
- Nationality: Polish
- Born: 10 January 1995 (age 31) Olsztyn, Poland
- Height: 1.89 m (6 ft 2 in)

Sport
- Sport: Handball
- Position: Centre back
- Current club: MMTS Kwidzyn
- Number: 19

Senior clubs
- Years: Team
- 2011–2014: SMS Gdańsk
- 2014–: MMTS Kwidzyn
- 2014–2015: → Pomezania Malbork (loan)
National team
| Years | Team | Apps | (Gls) |
| 2017– | Poland | 15 | (23) |

Michał Potoczny (born 10 January 1995) is a Polish handball player for MMTS Kwidzyn and the Polish national team.
