= MMTS Kwidzyn =

Polish handball club

- Full name: Energa Borys Miejsko-Młodzieżowe Towarzystwo Sportowe Kwidzyn
- Short name: MMTS
- Founded: 1998; 28 years ago
- Arena: Kompleks Widowisko-Sportowy KCSiR
- Capacity: 1,504
- President: Kamil Świątkowski
- Head coach: Bartłomiej Jaszka
- League: Polish Superliga
- Club colours
Home	Away

MMTS Kwidzyn is a men's handball club from Kwidzyn, Poland, that plays in the Superliga.

The current name of the club is Energa Borys MMTS Kwidzyn due to sponsorship reasons.

Location of MMTS Kwidzyn

== History ==
The team was founded in 1998. In the 1999/2000 season, it reached 2nd place in the Division 1 Group B and was promoted to the Superliga. In its first season in the Superliga, the team finished in 8th place. In the 2008/2009 season, the team stood on the podium of the Polish championship for the first time: in the fight for the bronze medal, they defeated the AZS-AWFiS Gdańsk team 3:2. In the 2008/2009 season, the team started in the international cup for the first time, in the third round of the EHF Challenge Cup, they were eliminated against the Serbian RK Proleter Zrenjanin. The team finished in 3rd place in the regular season of the 2009/2010 season. They defeated Warmia Olsztyn in the quarter-finals of the play-off, and Wisła Płock in the semi-finals 3:2. The finals were decided by the fifth match played in Płock, in which MMTS unexpectedly won 26:25 and thus reached the finals. In the final, he lost 3:0 to Vive Kielce (20:27; 24:28; 32:36) and thus won the silver medal of the Polish championship. In the 2009/2010 season, the team reached the finals of the EHF Challenge Cup, but lost to the Portuguese Sporting CP (25:27; 26:27), thereby ending the competition in 2nd place. In the 2010/2011 season, MMTS won their second bronze medal, defeating Stal Mielec in the 3rd place match. The team finished the 2011/2012 season in 4th place, but won the bronze medal in the Polish Cup after defeating KS Azoty-Puławy. In the 2012/2013 season, the team won its 3rd bronze medal, winning against KS Azoty-Puławy 3:2 (29:25; 29:30; 27:36; 36:28; 29:28). Due to insufficient budget to play in the Polish Superliga, they wanted to dissolve the club at the end of the 2020/2021 season, but this did not happen in the end.

== Crest, colours, supporters ==
=== Kits ===
HOME
2009–10	2017–18

AWAY
2009–10	2017–18

== Team ==
=== Current squad ===
Squad for the 2025–26 season

Goalkeepers

- 1 (Poland) Eryk Pisarkiewicz
- 12 (Poland) Oliwier Chruściel
- 33 (Poland) Łukasz Zakreta

Left wingers

- 21 (Poland) Piotr Papaj
- 88 (Poland) Marcin Kostro

Right wingers

- 37 (Poland) Szymon Mucha
- 97 (Poland) Michał Czarnecki

Line players

- 3 (Poland) Pawel Stempin
- 25 (Poland) Ryszard Landzwojczak
- 28 (Poland) Marcel Skierka

Left backs

- 5 (Poland) Leon Łazarczyk
- 7 (Poland) Michał Bekisz
- 22 (Poland) Filip Jarosz
- 87 (Poland) Piotr Lewczyk

Centre backs

- 17 (Poland) Filip Wawrzyniak
- 19 (Poland) Michał Potoczny
- 20 (Poland) Maciej Pilitowski
- 32 (Poland) Konrad Pilitowski
- 89 (Poland) Filip Lewczyk

Right backs

- 13 (Serbia) Jovan Milićević
- 14 (Poland) Kacper Bogudziński
- 24 (Poland) Igor Malczak

=== Transfers ===
Transfers for the 2026–27 season

Joining

- (Poland) Szymon Działakiewicz (RB) from (Poland) KS Azoty-Puławy
- (Poland) Patryk Grzesik (CB) from (Poland) Piotrkowianin Piotrków Trybunalski
- (Poland) Krystian Marchewka (CB) from (Poland) Wisła Płock
- (Poland) Aleksander Drzewiński (GK) from (Poland) SMS Kielce
- (Poland) Kamil Skiba (LW) from (Poland) SMS Kielce

Leaving

- (Serbia) Jovan Milićević (RB) to (Kuwait) Al-Sulaibikhat SC
- (Poland) Michał Bekisz (LB) to (Poland) Piotrkowianin Piotrków Trybunalski
- (Poland) Oliwier Chruściel (GK) to (Poland) ITS Jeziorak Iława

=== Transfer History ===
Transfers for the 2025–26 season

Joining

- (Poland) Piotr Papaj (LW) from (Poland) Wybrzeże Gdańsk
- (Poland) Pawel Stempin (LP) from (Poland) Gwardia Opole
- (Poland) Eryk Pisarkiewicz (GK) (from (Poland) Grot Blachy Pruszyński Anilana)
- (Poland) Marcin Kostro (LW) (from (Poland) Enea Orlęta Zwoleń)
- (Poland) Filip Jarosz (LB) (back from loan at (Poland) Zagłębie Lubin)
- (Poland) Szymon Mucha (RW) (from (Poland) Śląsk Wrocław)
- (Poland) Marcel Skierka (P) (from (Poland) SMS ZPRP Kwidzyn)

Leaving

- (Poland) Wiktor Jankowski (LP) to (North Macedonia) RK Vardar
- (Poland) Mateusz Kosmala (RW) to (Poland) Zepter KPR Legionowo
- (Poland) Jakub Matlęga (GK) to (Italy) SSV Bozen Loacker
- (Poland) Jakub Welcz (LW) to (Poland) MKS Grudziądz
- (Poland) Tyberiusz Chałupka (LP) to (Poland) Śląsk Wrocław
- (Poland) Patryk Grzenkowicz (LW) (to (Poland) Sandra Spa Pogoń Szczecin) ?

== Previous squads ==
2009–2010 Team
Shirt No	Nationality	Player	Birth Date	Position
1	Poland	Artur Gawlik	22 September 1981 (age 45)	Goalkeeper
2	Poland	Adam Pacześny	11 April 1990 (age 36)	Line Player
3	Poland	Robert Orzechowski	20 November 1989 (age 36)	Right Back
4	Poland	Adrian Nogowski	27 March 1990 (age 36)	Left Winger
6	Poland	Maciej Mroczkowski	1 June 1980 (age 46)	Central Back
7	Poland	Jacek Wardziński	20 September 1980 (age 46)	Right Winger
8	Poland	Michał Peret	13 August 1987 (age 39)	Line Player
9	Belarus	Dzmitry Marhun	21 October 1979 (age 47)	Left Back
10	Poland	Michał Adamuszek	29 April 1986 (age 40)	Left Back
11	Poland	Marcin Markuszewski	29 December 1983 (age 42)	Left Winger
12	Poland	Miłosz Jedowski	1 March 1987 (age 39)	Goalkeeper
13	Poland	Tomasz Witaszak	21 March 1980 (age 46)	Line Player
14	Poland	Łukasz Cieślak	14 March 1984 (age 42)	Left Winger
15	Poland	Patryk Rombel	16 July 1983 (age 43)	Left Winger
16	Poland	Sebastian Suchowicz	20 January 1976 (age 50)	Goalkeeper
17	Poland	Mateusz Seroka	24 December 1988 (age 37)	Right Winger
18	Poland	Antoni Łangowski	19 April 1990 (age 36)	Left Back
20	Poland	Łukasz Czertowicz	3 September 1979 (age 47)	Left Back
22	Poland	Michał Waszkiewicz	13 September 1982 (age 44)	Central Back

== Honours ==
=== Domestic ===
- Polish Superliga:
  - Silver (1): 2010
  - Bronze (3): 2009, 2011, 2013
- Polish Cup:
  - Bronze (7): 2003, 2004, 2005, 2006, 2012, 2017, 2023

=== International ===
- EHF Challenge Cup :
  - Silver (1): 2010

== European record ==
=== EHF European League ===
Season	Round	Club	Home	Away	Aggregate
2022–23	Round 2	(Germany) SG Flensburg-Handewitt	25–39	24–37	49–76

=== EHF Challenge Cup ===
Season	Round	Club	Home	Away	Aggregate
2009–10	Round 4	(Romania) HC Odorheiu Secuiesc	32–20	23–35	55–55 (a)
2009–10	Quarter-finals	(Portugal) Xico Andebol	25–28	28–23	53–51
2009–10	Semi-finals	(Italy) Bologna United Handball	28–19	24–24	52–43
2009–10	Finals	(Portugal) Sporting CP	25–27	26–27	51–54
2008–09	Round 3	(Serbia) RK Proleter Naftagas	24–29	15–23	39–52

=== EHF ranking ===
As of 22 October 2026

Rank	Team	Points
221	(Slovenia) RD Ribnica	7
222	(Slovenia) RD Ribnica	7
223	(Turkey) Köycegiz BLD SK	7
224	(Poland) MMTS Kwidzyn	6
225	(Belarus) SKA Minsk	6
226	(Estonia) HC Tallinn	6
227	(England) London GD HC	6

== Former club members ==
=== Notable former players ===
==== Goalkeepers ====
- (Poland) Sebastian Suchowicz (2004–2013)
- (Poland) Krzysztof Szczecina (2011–2014, 2016–2022)
- (Poland) Łukasz Zakreta (2022–)

==== Right wingers ====
- (Poland) Michał Daszek (2011–2014)
- (Poland) Piotr Frelek (2000–2006)
- (Poland) Mateusz Kosmala (2019–2020, 2023–)
- (Poland) Mateusz Seroka (2007–2017)
- (Poland) Jakub Szyszko (2020–2023)

==== Left wingers ====
- (Poland) Damian Kostrzewa (2011–2012)
- (Poland) Adrian Nogowski (2009–2011, 2012–2020)
- (Poland) Patryk Rombel (2001–2013)

==== Line players ====
- (Poland) Michał Peret (2006–2023)

==== Left backs ====
- (Poland) Kacper Adamski (2018–2020)
- (Poland) Michał Adamuszek (2008–2013)
- (Poland) Paweł Genda (2013–2017)
- (Poland) Hubert Kornecki (2021–2023)
- (Poland) Kamil Krieger (2006–2008, 2011–2012, 2016–2022)
- (Poland) Antoni Łangowski (2009–2015)
- (Poland) Damian Przytuła (2018–2021)

==== Central backs ====
- (Poland) Maciej Mroczkowski (1998–2016)
- (Poland) Arkadiusz Ossowski (2014–2015, 2016–2022)
- (Poland) Maciej Pilitowski (2014–2018, 2024–)
- (Poland) Michał Potoczny (2015–2021, 2022–)

==== Right backs ====
- (Poland) Ignacy Bąk (2017)
- (Poland) Robert Orzechowski (2008–2013, 2018–2023)
- (Poland) Marek Szpera (2015–2017)
- (Poland) Daniel Urbanowicz (2005–2008)
- (Poland) Przemysław Zadura (2013–2016)
- (Ukraine) Bogdan Cherkashchenko (2023–2024)
