= Maciej Pilitowski =

Polish handball player (born 1990)

Personal information
- Nationality: Polish
- Born: 27 October 1990 (age 35) Ciechanów, Poland
- Height: 1.88 m (6 ft 2 in)

Sport
- Sport: Handball
- Position: Centre back
- Current club: Energa MKS Kalisz
- Number: 24

Youth career
- Years: Team
- –2006: Jurand Ciechanów
- 2006–2008: SMS Gdańsk

Senior clubs
- Years: Team
- 2008–2009: SMS Gdańsk
- 2009–2010: AZS-AWFiS Gdańsk
- 2010–2014: Piotrkowianin Piotrków Trybunalski
- 2014–2018: MMTS Kwidzyn
- 2018–: Energa MKS Kalisz
National team
| Years | Team | Apps | (Gls) |
| 2013– | Poland | 20 | (22) |

Maciej Pilitowski (born 27 October 1990) is a Polish handball player for Energa MKS Kalisz and the Polish national team.

== Career ==
=== National team ===
Pilitowski made his debut for the national team on 4 January 2013, in a friendly match against Hungary (27:29). He was also chosen to participate at the 2014 European Championship in Denmark, but failed to make it to the final squad.

He represented Poland at the 2020 European Men's Handball Championship.
