= Maciej Zarzycki =

Polish handball player (born 1998)

Personal information
- Nationality: Polish
- Born: 26 July 1998 (age 28) Lublin, Poland
- Height: 1.86 m (6 ft 1 in)

Sport
- Sport: Handball
- Position: Centre back, Right back
- Current club: Gwardia Opole
- Number: 7

Youth career
- Years: Team
- –2014: Unia Lublin
- 2014–2017: SMS Gdańsk

Senior clubs
- Years: Team
- 2017–: Gwardia Opole
National team
Years	Team	Apps	(Gls)
2019–	Poland	3	(0)

Maciej Zarzycki (born 26 July 1998) is a Polish handball player for Gwardia Opole and the Polish national team.
