= Tomasz Strząbała =

Polish handball coach (born 1966)

Personal information
- Nationality: Polish
- Born: 19 January 1966 (age 60) Kielce, Poland

Sport
- Sport: Handball
- Current club: Energa MKS Kalisz (manager)

Teams managed
- Years: Team
- 2008–2018: PGE Vive Kielce (assistant)
- 2018–2019: MMTS Kwidzyn
- 2020: KSZO Ostrowiec Świętokrzyski
- 2020–2021: Energa MKS Kalisz
- 2022-: Grupa Azoty Unia Tarnów

Tomasz Strząbała (born 19 January 1966) is a Polish handball coach.
