= Antoni Łangowski =

Polish handball player (born 1990)

Personal information
- Nationality: Polish
- Born: 19 April 1990 (age 36) Czersk, Poland
- Height: 1.95 m (6 ft 5 in)

Sport
- Sport: Handball
- Position: Left back
- Current club: KS Azoty-Puławy
- Number: 8

Youth career
- Years: Team
- –2009: SMS Gdańsk

Senior clubs
- Years: Team
- 2009–2015: MMTS Kwidzyn
- 2015–2019: Gwardia Opole
- 2019–: KS Azoty-Puławy
National team
Years	Team	Apps	(Gls)
2013–	Poland	31	(57)

Antoni Łangowski (born 19 April 1990) is a Polish handball player for Gwardia Opole and the Polish national team.

== Career ==
He made his debut for the national team on 4 June 2013, in a friendly match against Sweden (27:29), where he scored two goals. He was also chosen to participate at the 2013 World Championship in Spain, but failed to make it to the final squad.

He represented Poland at the 2020 European Men's Handball Championship.
