= Robert Orzechowski =

Polish handball player (born 1989)

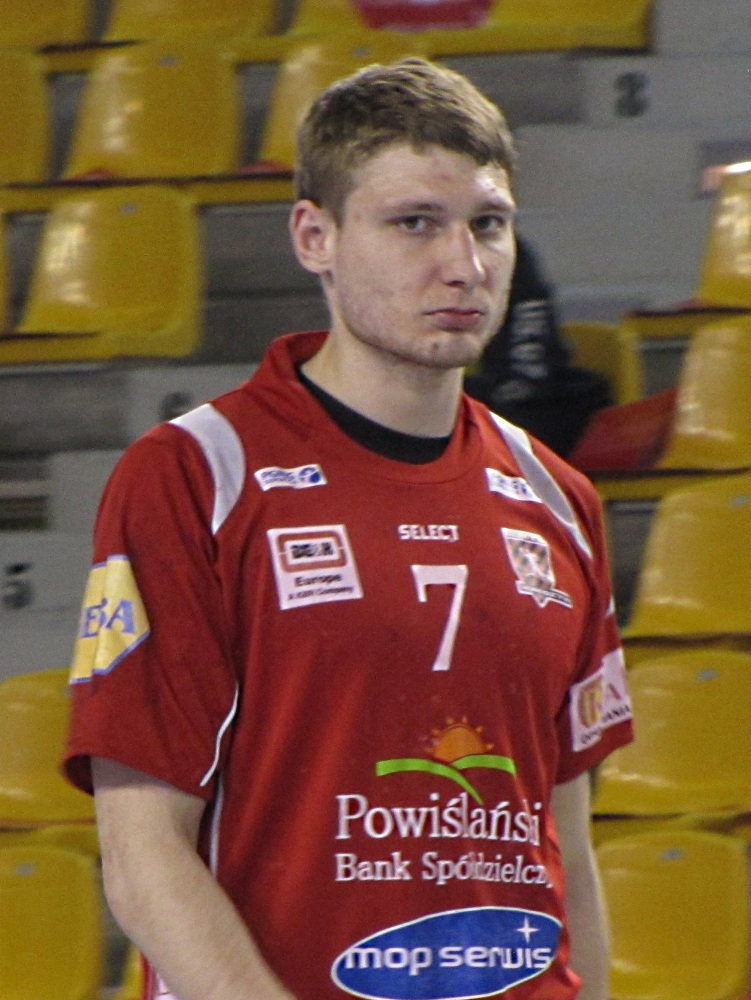

Personal information
- Nationality: Polish
- Born: 20 November 1989 (age 36) Gdańsk, Poland
- Height: 1.90 m (6 ft 3 in)

Sport
- Sport: Handball
- Position: Right back

Senior clubs
- Years: Team
- 2005–2008: SMS Gdańsk
- 2008–2013: MMTS Kwidzyn
- 2013–2015: Górnik Zabrze
- 2015–2018: KS Azoty-Puławy
- 2018–2023: MMTS Kwidzyn
National team
Years	Team	Apps	(Gls)
2010–2016	Poland	70	(106)
Medal record
World Championship
Bronze medal – third place	2015 Qatar

Robert Orzechowski (born 20 November 1989) is a Polish retired handball player.

== Career ==
On 1 February 2015, Poland, including Orzechowski, won the bronze medal of the 2015 World Championship. He also participated at the 2016 European Men's Handball Championship.

== State awards ==
- 2015 Silver Cross of Merit
