= Nogowski =

Surname list

Nowgowski (masculine), Nowgowska (feminine) is a Polish surname. Notable people with the surname include:

- Adrian Nogowski (born 1990), Polish handball player
- Ewa Kowalkowska née Nogowska (born 1975), Polish volleyball player
- John Nogowski (born 1993), American baseball player
