= Kiryl Kniazeu =

Belarusian handball player

Personal information
- Nationality: Belarusian
- Born: 9 March 1990 (age 36) Slutsk, Belarus
- Height: 1.95 m (6 ft 5 in)

Sport
- Sport: Handball
- Position: Left back
- Current club: Energa MKS Kalisz
- Number: 38

Senior clubs
- Years: Team
- 2010–2012: SKA Minsk
- 2012–2013: Meshkov Brest
- 2013–2015: SKA Minsk
- 2015–2017: Pogoń Szczecin
- 2017–: Energa MKS Kalisz
National team
Years	Team	Apps	(Gls)
2010–	Belarus	49	(95)

Kiryl Kniazeu (born 9 March 1990) is a Belarusian handball player for Energa MKS Kalisz and the Belarusian national team.
