= Marek Szpera =

Polish handball player (born 1987)

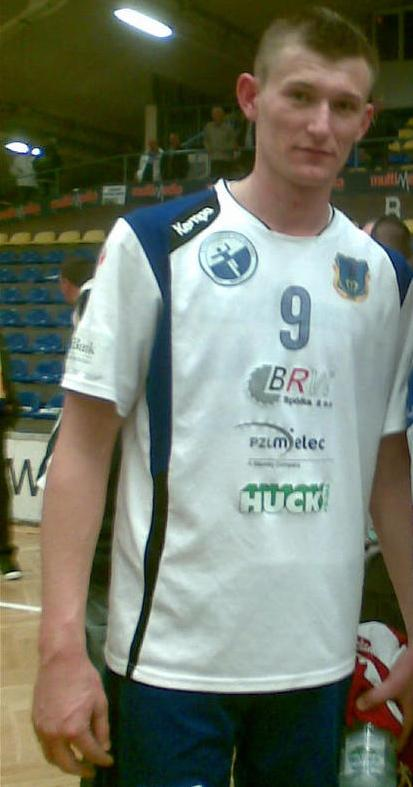

Personal information
- Nationality: Polish
- Born: 9 September 1987 (age 39) Ostrów Wielkopolski, Poland
- Height: 1.91 m (6 ft 3 in)

Sport
- Sport: Handball
- Position: Right back
- Current club: Energa MKS Kalisz
- Number: 22

Senior clubs
- Years: Team
- –2009: Ostrovia Ostrów Wielkopolski
- 2009–2015: Stal Mielec
- 2015–2017: MMTS Kwidzyn
- 2017–: Energa MKS Kalisz
National team
| Years | Team | Apps | (Gls) |
| 2013– | Poland | 30 | (16) |

Marek Szpera (born 9 September 1987) is a Polish handball player for Energa MKS Kalisz and the Polish national team.

He competed at the 2013 World Men's Handball Championship.
