= Piotr Czaczka =

Polish handball player (born 1958)

Personal information
- Nationality: Polish
- Born: 15 January 1958 (age 68) Czarnowąsy, Poland
- Height: 1.90 m (6 ft 3 in)

Sport
- Sport: Handball
- Position: Pivot

Senior clubs
- Years: Team
- 1978–1982: Gwardia Opole
- 1982–1992: Śląsk Wrocław
National team
Years	Team	Apps	(Gls)
1979–1992	Poland	50	(40)

Piotr Czaczka (born 15 January 1958) is a former Polish handball player who competed in the 1980 Summer Olympics and finished seventh with the Polish team.
