= Zbigniew Kwiatkowski =

Polish handball player (born 1985)

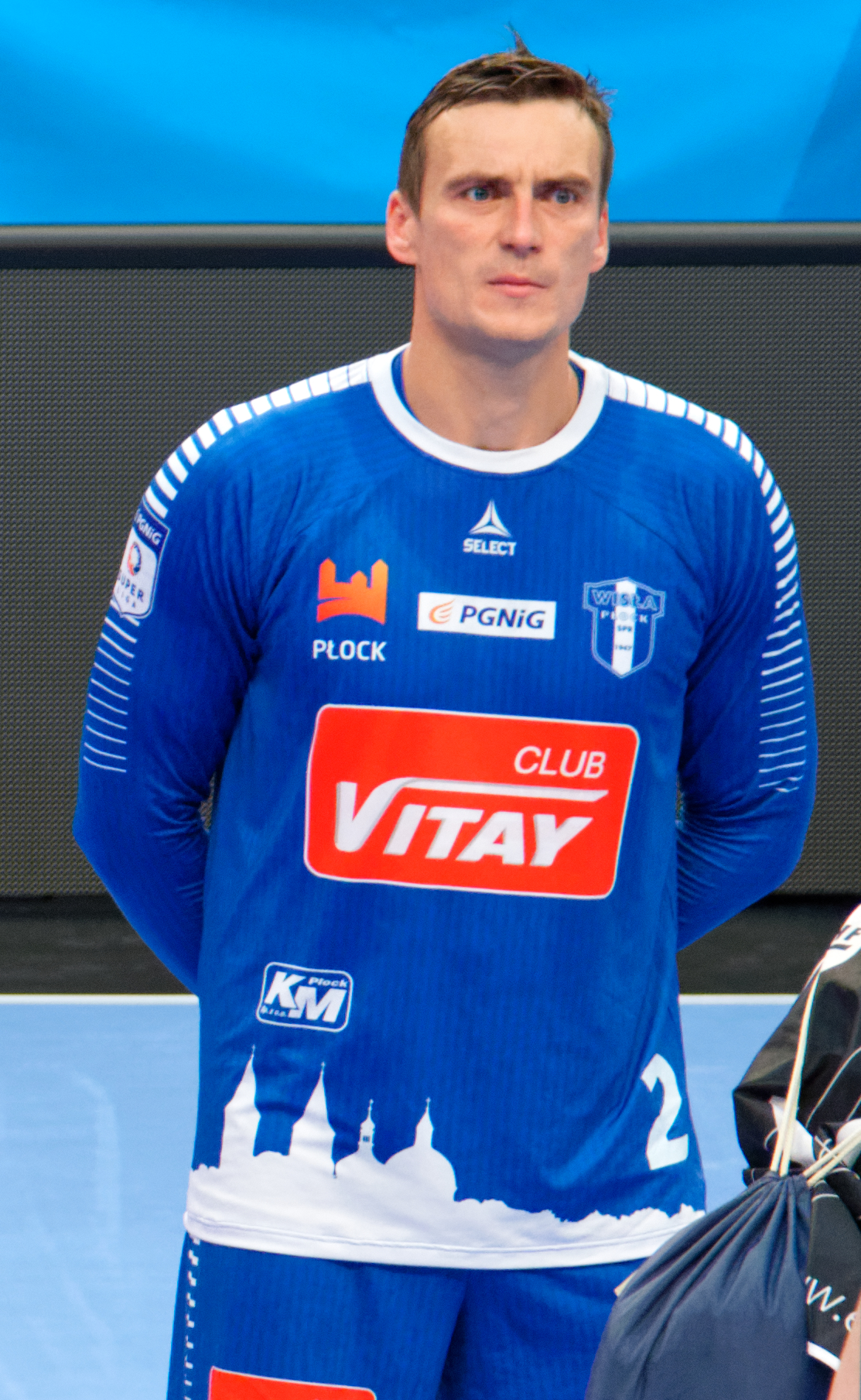

Personal information
- Full name: Zbigniew Kwiatkowski
- Nationality: Polish
- Born: 2 April 1985 (age 41) Mława, Poland
- Height: 2.08 m (6 ft 10 in)

Sport
- Sport: Handball
- Position: Pivot
- Current club: Energa MKS Kalisz
- Number: 2
National team
Years	Team	Apps	(Gls)
2007–	Poland	26	(15)
Medal record
World Championships
Silver medal – second place	2007 Germany

Zbigniew Kwiatkowski (born 2 April 1985, in Mława) is a Polish handballer who plays for Energa MKS Kalisz and the Polish national team.

== Awards ==
- Gold Cross of Merit (2007)
