= Adam Malcher =

Polish handball player (born 1986)

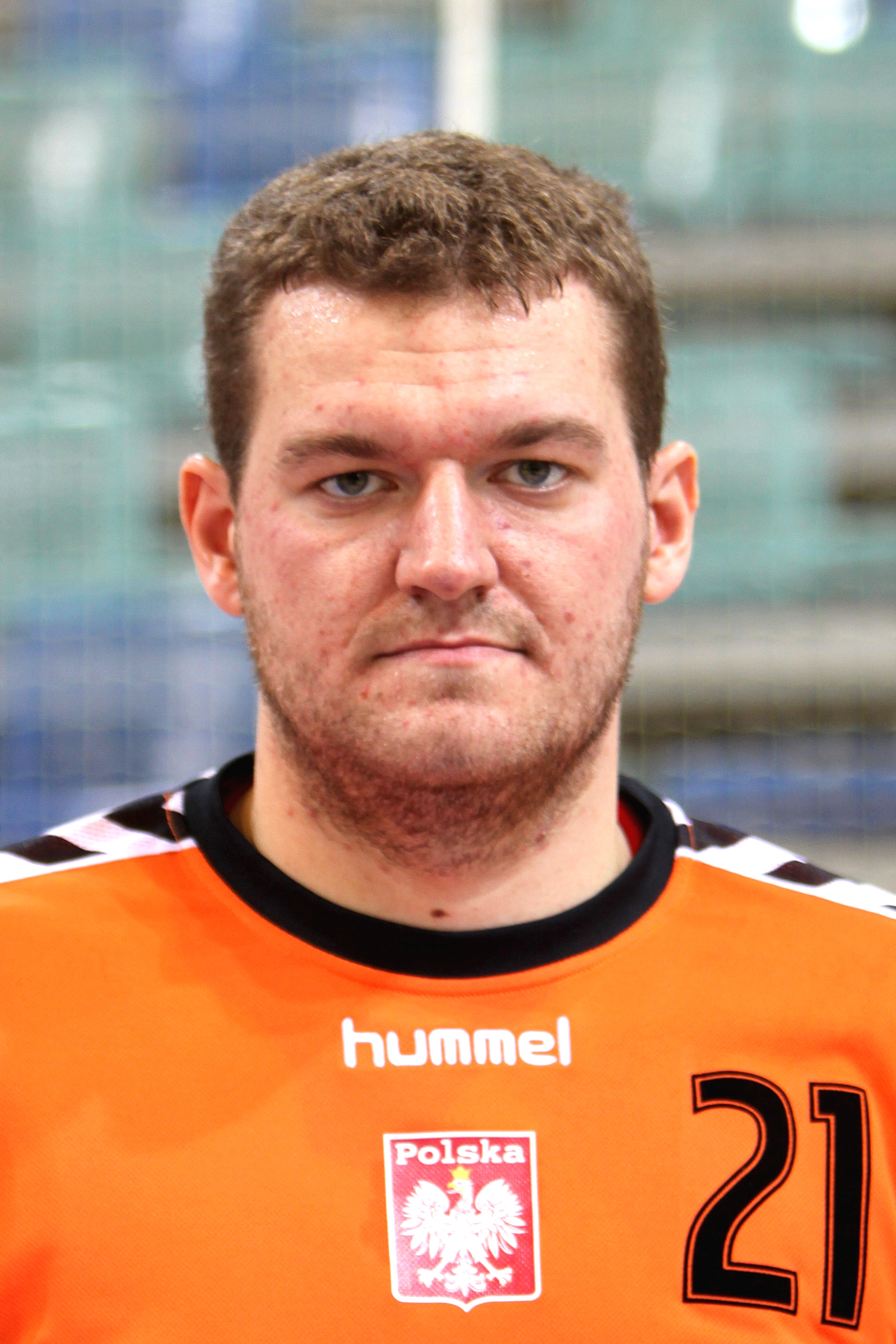

Personal information
- Nationality: Polish
- Born: 22 May 1986 (age 40) Opole, Poland
- Height: 1.98 m (6 ft 6 in)

Sport
- Sport: Handball
- Position: Goalkeeper
- Current club: Gwardia Opole
- Number: 16

Youth career
- Years: Team
- –2003: Gwardia Opole

Senior clubs
- Years: Team
- 2003–2005: Gwardia Opole
- 2005–2013: Zagłębie Lubin
- 2013–: Gwardia Opole
National team
| Years | Team | Apps | (Gls) |
| 2008– | Poland | 69 | (1) |
Medal record
World Championship
| Bronze medal – third place | 2009 Croatia |

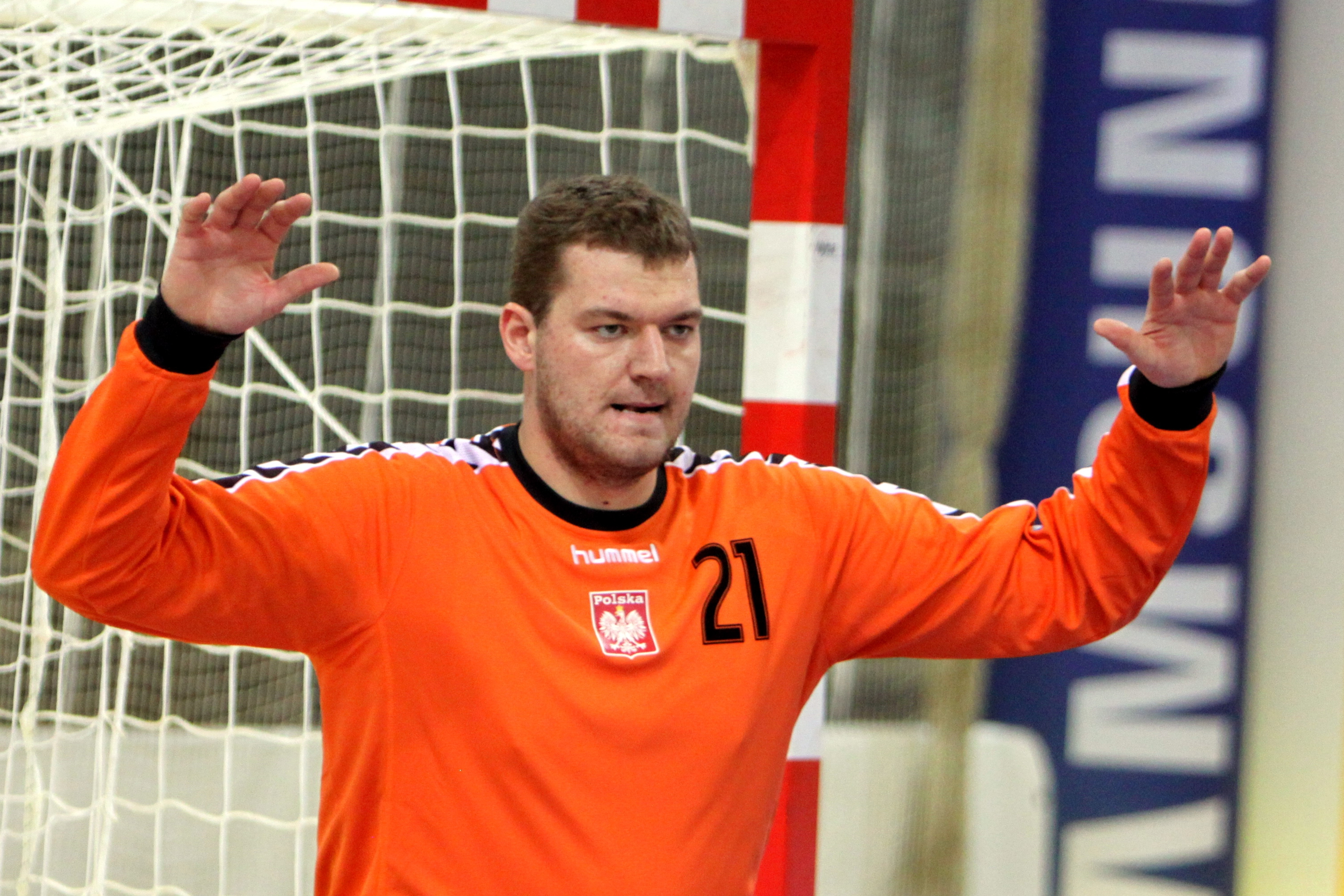
Adam Malcher during a match with the national team.

Adam Malcher (born 21 May 1986) is a Polish handball player for Gwardia Opole and the Polish national handball team.

He participated at the 2009 World Men's Handball Championship and at the 2017 World Men's Handball Championship.

== Sporting achievements ==
=== Clubs ===
- National championships
  - 2006/2007 Polish Championship, with Zagłębie Lubin

=== National team ===
- 2009 IHF World Championship
