= Adrian Nogowski =

Polish handball player (born 1990)

Personal information
- Nationality: Polish
- Born: 27 March 1990 (age 36) Kwidzyn, Poland
- Height: 1.82 m (6 ft 0 in)

Sport
- Sport: Handball
- Position: Left wing
- Current club: MMTS Kwidzyn

Senior clubs
- Years: Team
- 2007–2009: SMS Gdańsk
- 2009–2020: MMTS Kwidzyn
- 2011–2012: → Pomezania Malbork (loan)
National team
Years	Team	Apps	(Gls)
2016–2018	Poland	11	(17)

Adrian Nogowski (born 27 March 1990) is a former Polish handball player.
