= Ergo Arena =

Sport facility in Gdańsk/Sopot, Poland

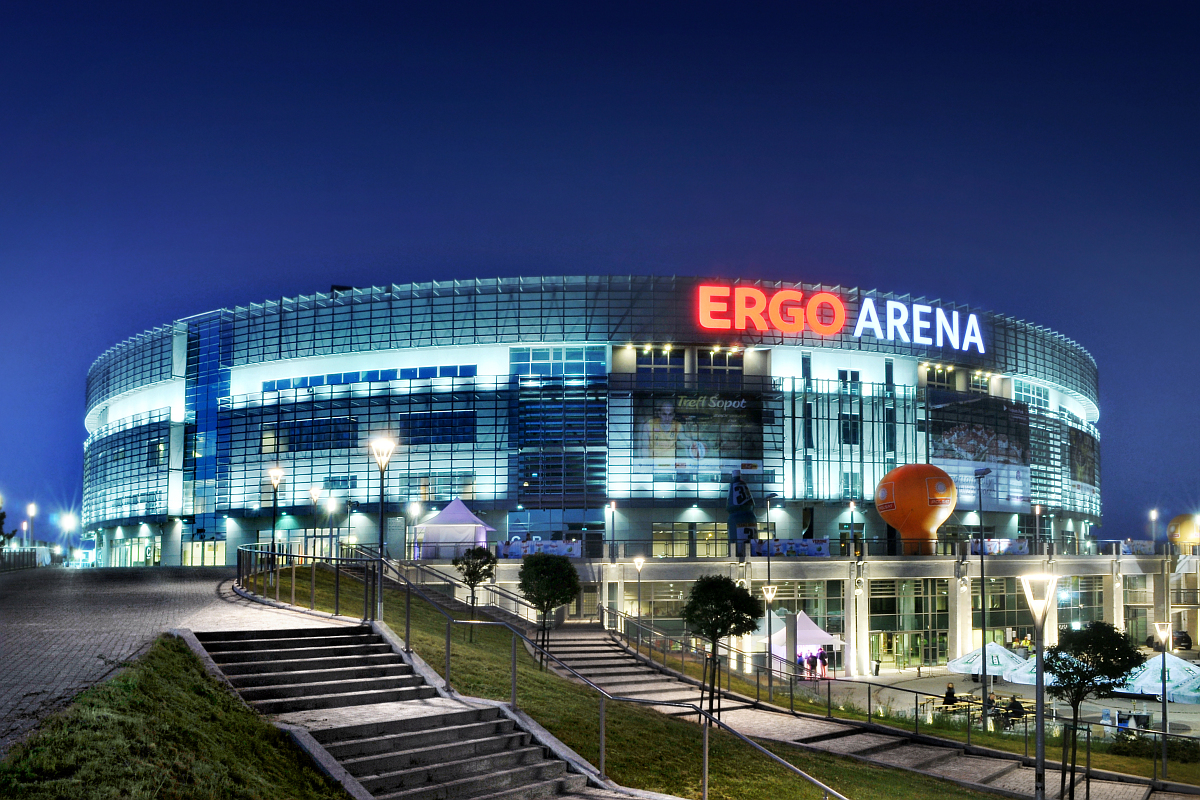
- Ergo Arena in 2011
- Interactive map of Ergo Arena
- Former names: Hala Gdańsk-Sopot
- Address: pl. Dwóch Miast 1, 80-344 Gdańsk/Sopot
- Location: Gdańsk and Sopot, Poland
- Coordinates: 54°25′33″N 18°34′49″E
- Operator: Hala Gdańsk-Sopot sp. z o.o.
- Capacity: 11,409 (sports); 15,000 (concerts)
- Executive suites: 940
- Field size: 96m x 30m x 48m

Construction
- Groundbreaking: 2007
- Opened: 18 August 2010
- Cost: 251 million zł (€60 million)
- Architect: KIPP Projekt

Tenants
- Trefl Sopot (2010–present); Trefl Gdańsk (2014–present)

Ergo Arena, formerly known as Hala Gdańsk-Sopot, is a multi-purpose indoor arena on the border of Gdańsk and Sopot, Poland, opened in 2010. The boundary between the two cities runs through the middle of the venue. The arena has a capacity of 11,409 people for sports events and up to 15,000 (with standing places) for concerts, making it one of the largest indoor arenas in the country.

== History ==
The first major event in the arena was a concert of Lady Gaga’s The Monster Ball Tour on 26 November 2010, with Semi Precious Weapons as the opening act.

The venue has hosted various sports events, including the 2013 Men's European Volleyball Championship, the 2014 IAAF World Indoor Championships and the 2014 FIVB Volleyball Men's World Championship, as well as a part of the 2016 European Men's Handball Championship.

Ergo Hestia acquired naming rights for the venue upon its completion in 2010, with the agreement later extended until 2030.

A six-lane banked 200-meter oval is installed on the arena floor for athletics.

== Gallery ==
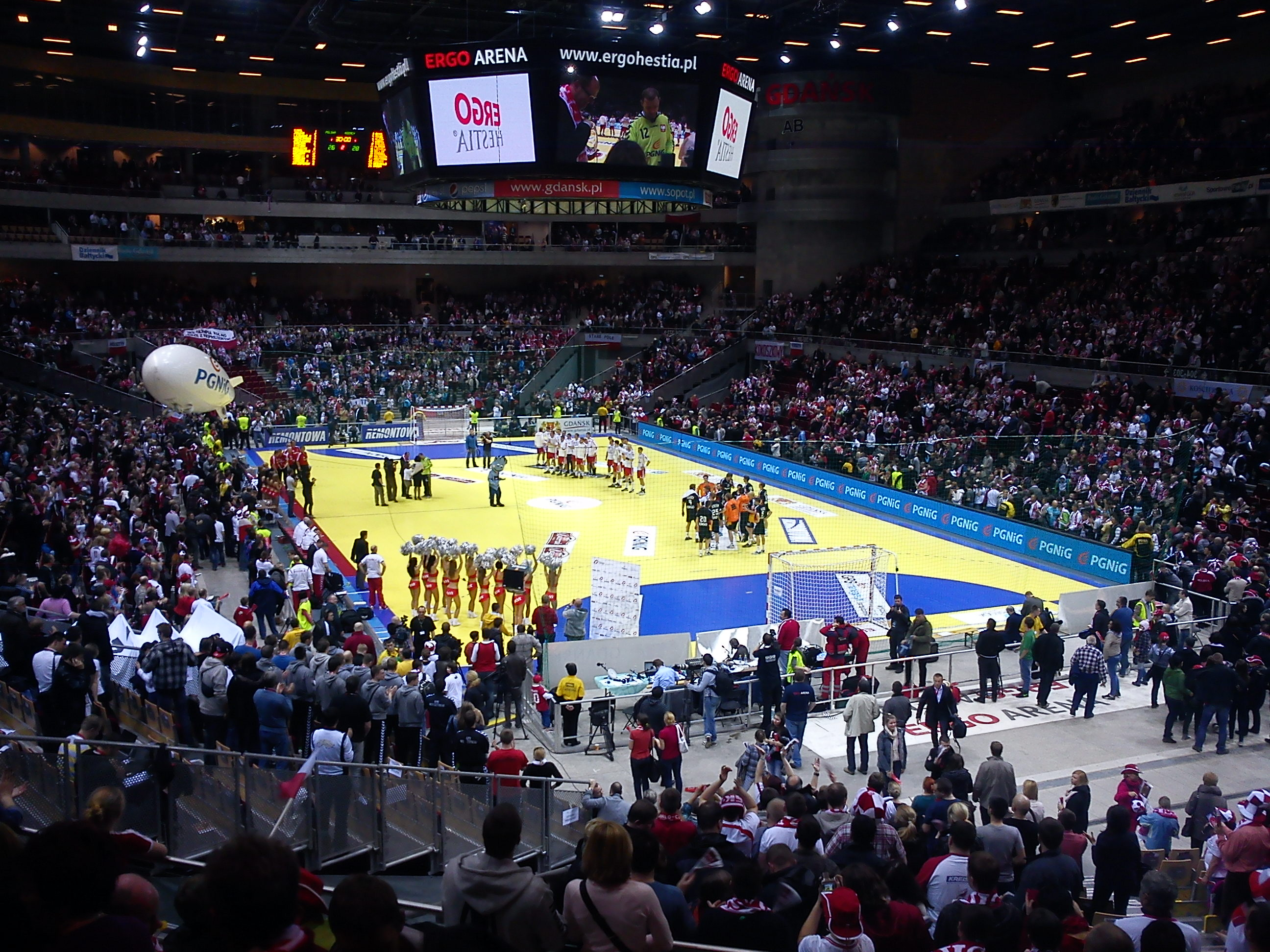
Interior before a handball game

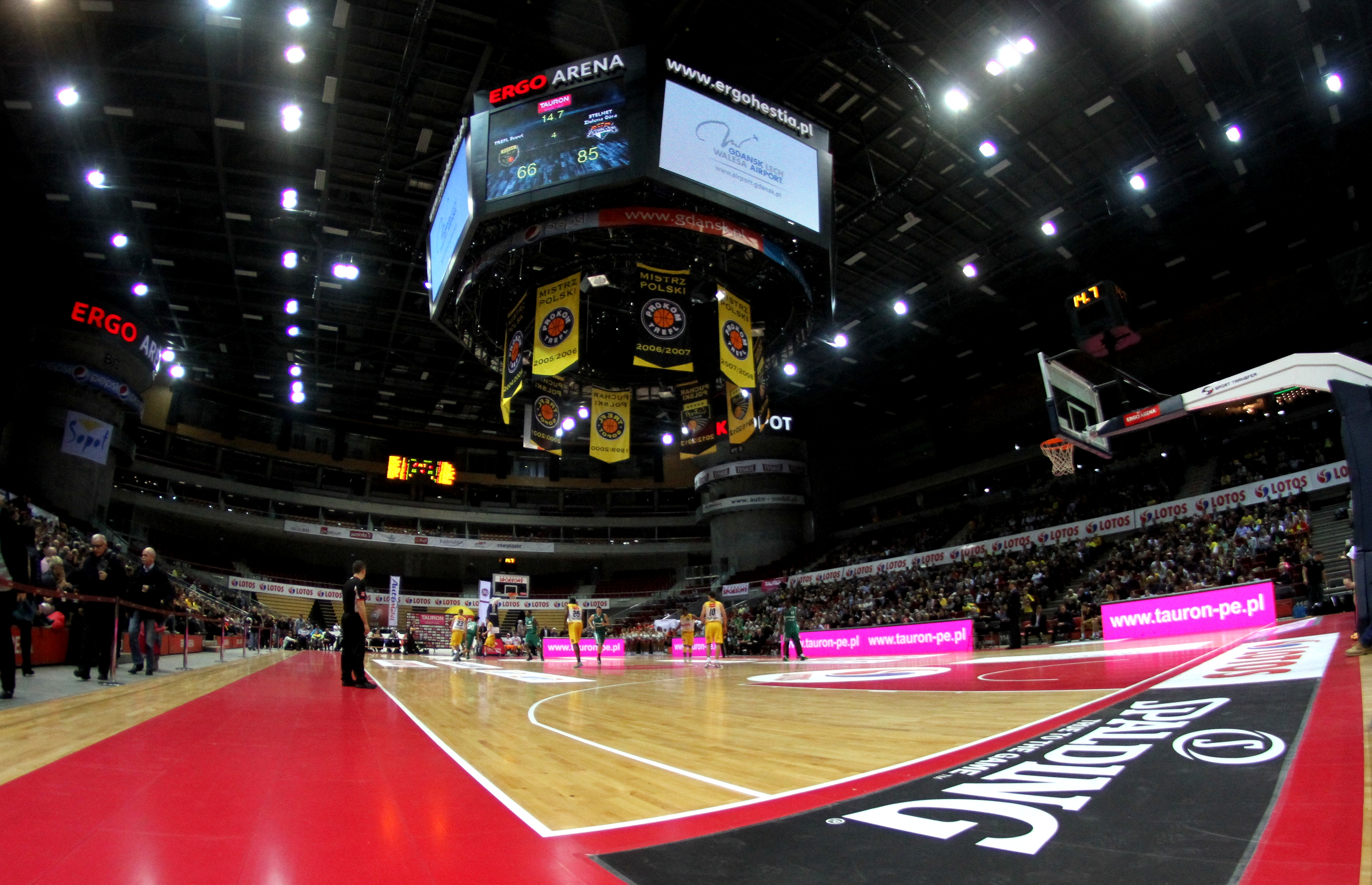
Basketball game (Trefl Sopot vs Stelmet Zielona Góra)

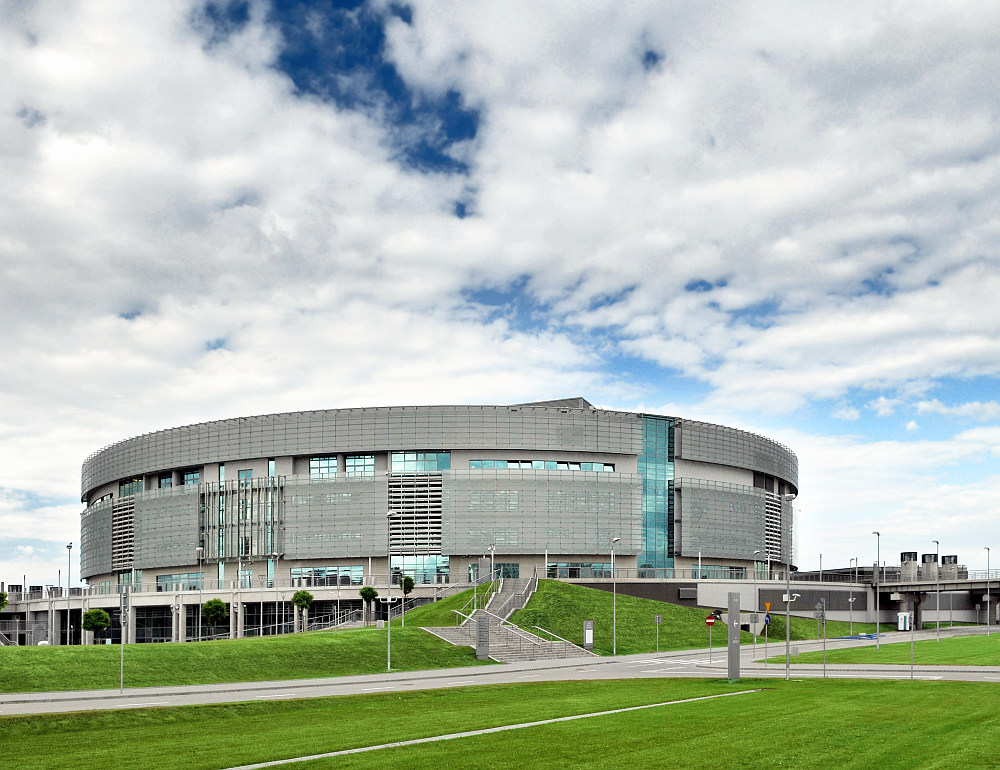
In daylight

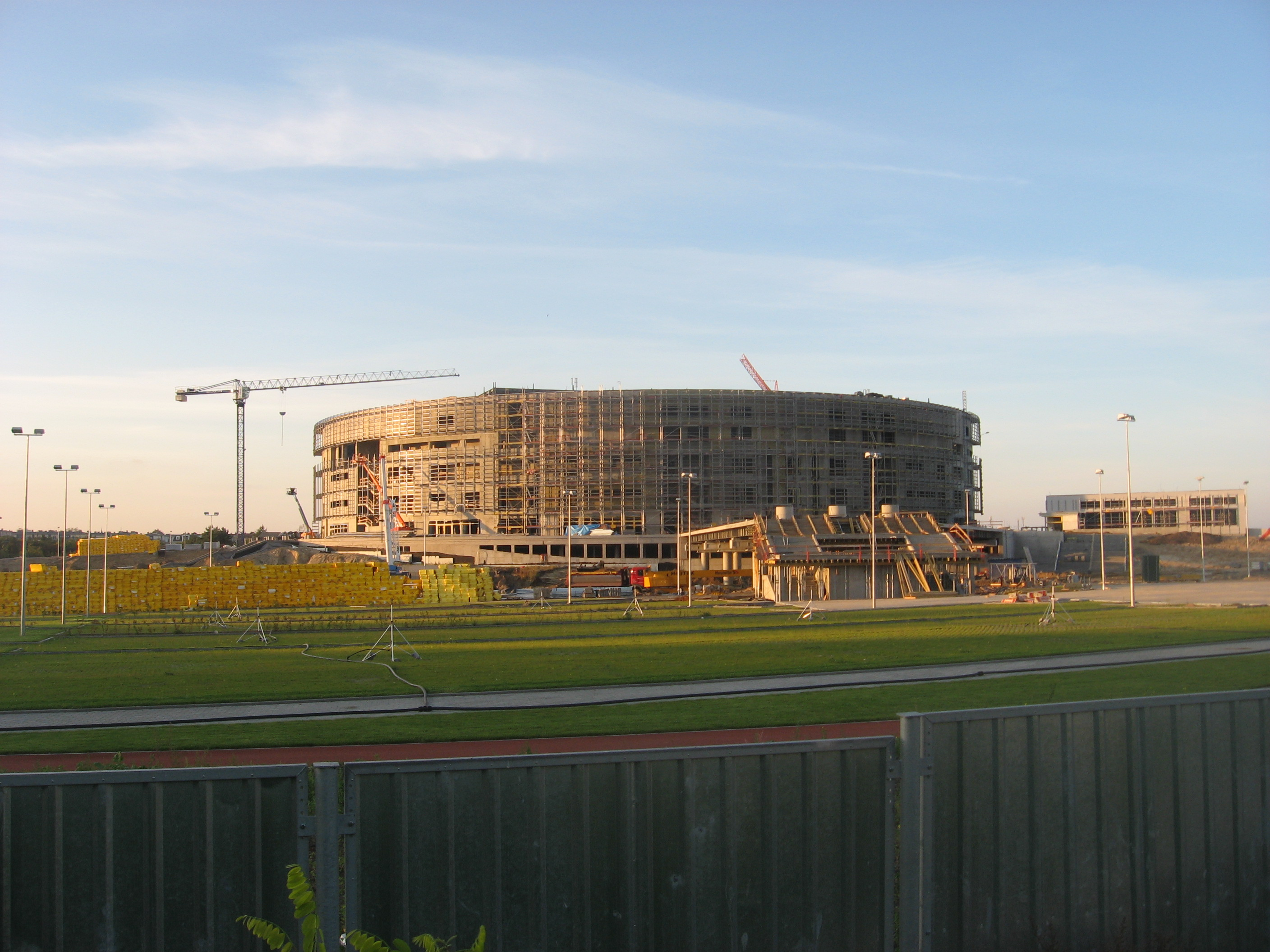
Under construction

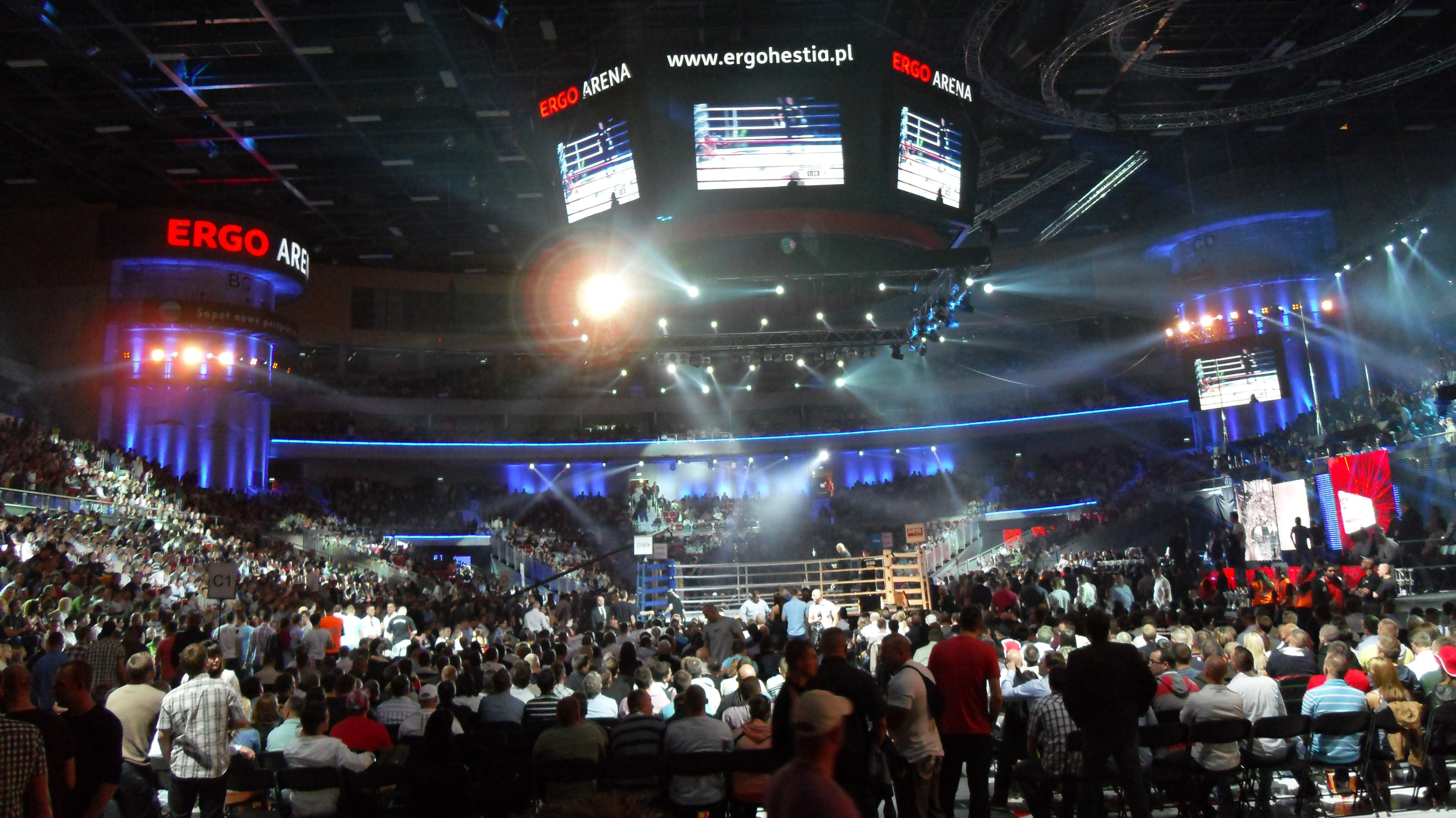
Ergo Arena during a KSW MMA event

== See also ==
- List of indoor arenas in Poland
- Sport in Poland

Preceded by Orfeo Superdomo; Córdoba	FIVB Volleyball World League; Final Venue; 2011	Succeeded by Arena Armeec; Sofia
Preceded by Ataköy Athletics Arena; Istanbul	IAAF World Indoor Championships in Athletics; Venue; 2014	Succeeded by Oregon Convention Center; Portland, Oregon
