= Mateusz Kus =

Polish handball player (born 1987)

Personal information
- Nationality: Polish
- Born: 14 July 1987 (age 39) Piekary Śląskie, Poland
- Height: 2.00 m (6 ft 7 in)

Sport
- Sport: Handball
- Position: Pivot
- Current club: Energa MKS Kalisz
- Number: 11

Youth career
- Years: Team
- –2004: Olimpia Piekary Śląskie

Senior clubs
- Years: Team
- 2004–2008: Olimpia Piekary Śląskie
- 2008–2015: KS Azoty-Puławy
- 2015–2018: PGE Vive Kielce
- 2018–2020: HC Motor Zaporizhzhia
- 2020–: Energa MKS Kalisz
National team
Years	Team	Apps	(Gls)
2016–	Poland	19	(13)

Mateusz Kus (born 14 July 1987) is a Polish handball player who plays for Energa MKS Kalisz and the Polish national team.

He participated at the 2016 Summer Olympics in Rio de Janeiro, in the men's handball tournament.
