= Patryk Rombel =

Polish handball coach (born 1983)

Personal information
- Nationality: Polish
- Born: 16 July 1983 (age 43) Kwidzyn, Poland

Sport
- Sport: Handball
- Current club: Wybrzeże Gdańsk

Teams managed
- Years: Team
- 2015–2017: MMTS Kwidzyn
- 2016–2017: Poland (AC)
- 2017–2018: HC Motor Zaporizhzhia
- 2019–2023: Poland
- 2023–: Wybrzeże Gdańsk

Patryk Rombel (born 16 July 1983) is a Polish handball coach.

He coached the Polish team at the 2020 European Men's Handball Championship.
