= Hala Arena =

Indoor sports arena in Poznań, Poland

- Arena
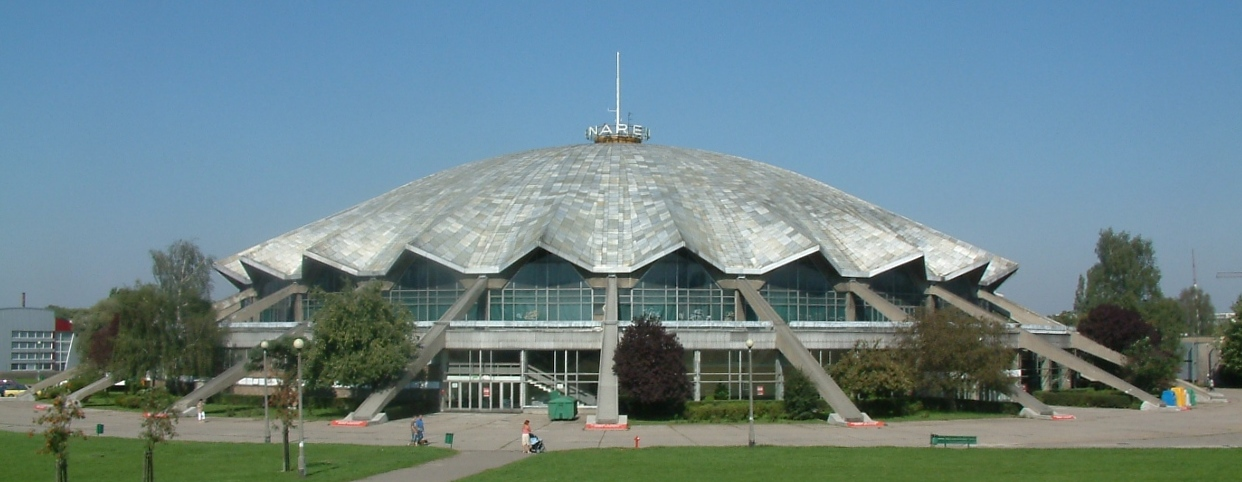
- Interactive map of Hala Arena
- Full name: Hala widowiskowo-sportowa Arena
- Location: Poznań, Poland
- Coordinates: 52.398163°N 16.892233°E
- Owner: City of Poznań
- Capacity: 6200
- Type: Multi-purpose arena
- Scoreboard: 24 m × 15 m (79 ft × 49 ft)
- Acreage: 13,500 m^{2} (145,000 sq ft)

Construction
- Groundbreaking: July 1972
- Opened: 28 June 1974
- Architect: Jerzy Turzeniecki

Website
- www.arenapoznan.pl Building details

General information
- Inaugurated: 1969

Height
- Height: 28 m (92 ft)

Dimensions
- Diameter: 100 m (330 ft)

Technical details
- Floor area: 1,625 m^{2} (17,490 sq ft)

Other information
- Number of suites: Press: 99 spaces VIP: 69 spaces
- Parking: Reymont Street: 175 car spaces Pool: 225 car spaces + 16 coach spaces

Hala Arena [ˈxala aˈrɛna], generally called simply Arena, is an indoor sporting arena in the Grunwald district of the city of Poznań in western Poland. It is primarily used for volleyball, other indoor sports, and concerts. The venue opened in 1974 and seats approximately 5,500 people, depending on type of event.

The arena hosted a preliminary round group of the EuroBasket 2009 competition.

In 1985 Hala Arena hosted the Rock Arena two day festival headlined by Hanoi Rocks and Pretty Maids. Many other international rock bands played there during the PRL (Communist government) era in the 1980s, including Iron Maiden, Dire Straits, Marillion, Leonard Cohen and UFO.

Hala was the penultimate site, on August 19, 1990, of the Rolling Stones 1989-1990 Steel Wheels/Urban Jungle Tour.

== See also ==
- List of indoor arenas in Poland
- Sport in Poland
