= Mateusz Zembrzycki =

Polish handball player (born 1997)

Personal information
- Nationality: Polish
- Born: 18 March 1997 (age 29) Legnica, Poland
- Height: 1.95 m (6 ft 5 in)

Sport
- Sport: Handball
- Position: Goalkeeper
- Current club: KS Azoty-Puławy
- Number: 12

Youth career
- Years: Team
- –2014: Siódemka Miedź Legnica
- 2014–2016: Gwardia Opole

Senior clubs
- Years: Team
- 2016–2020: Gwardia Opole
- 2016–2017: → Olimp Grodków (loan)
- 2020–: KS Azoty-Puławy
National team
Years	Team	Apps	(Gls)
2020–	Poland	3	(0)

Mateusz Zembrzycki (born 18 March 1997) is a Polish handball player for KS Azoty-Puławy and the Polish national team.
