= Kacper Adamski =

Polish handball player (born 1992)

Personal information
- Nationality: Polish
- Born: 19 March 1992 (age 34) Płock, Poland
- Height: 1.86 m (6 ft 1 in)

Sport
- Sport: Handball
- Position: Left back
- Current club: Energa MKS Kalisz
- Number: 10

Senior clubs
- Years: Team
- –2012: Wisła Płock
- 2012–2014: Siódemka Miedź Legnica
- 2014–2015: Wybrzeże Gdańsk
- 2015–2016: Wisła Płock
- 2016–2017: Gwardia Opole
- 2017–2018: KPR Legionowo
- 2018–2020: MMTS Kwidzyn
- 2020–: Energa MKS Kalisz
National team
Years	Team	Apps	(Gls)
2014–	Poland	3	(8)

Kacper Adamski (born 19 March 1992) is a Polish handball player for Energa MKS Kalisz and the Polish national team.
