= Kamil Mokrzki =

Polish handball player (born 1991)

Personal information
- Nationality: Polish
- Born: 29 October 1991 (age 34) Płock, Poland
- Height: 1.85 m (6 ft 1 in)

Sport
- Sport: Handball
- Position: Centre back
- Current club: Gwardia Opole
- Number: 14

Senior clubs
- Years: Team
- 2009–2011: Wisła Płock
- 2011–2014: NMC Górnik Zabrze
- 2014–: Gwardia Opole
National team
Years	Team	Apps	(Gls)
2018–	Poland	3	(1)

Kamil Mokrzki (born 29 October 1991) is a Polish handball player for Gwardia Opole and the Polish national team.
