= Piotr Jędraszczyk =

Polish handball player (born 2001)

Personal information
- Nationality: Polish
- Born: 9 October 2001 (age 25) Łódź, Poland
- Height: 1.77 m (5 ft 10 in)

Sport
- Sport: Handball
- Position: Centre back
- Current club: Industria Kielce
- Number: 4

Youth career
- Years: Team
- –2020: Anilana Łódź

Senior clubs
- Years: Team
- 2020–2023: Piotrkowianin Piotrków Trybunalski
- 2023–: Industria Kielce
- 2023–2025: → Corotop Gwardia Opole
National team
Years	Team	Apps	(Gls)
2021–	Poland	50	(119)
- Updated on 12 January 2026

Piotr Jędraszczyk (born 9 October 2001) is a Polish handball player for Industria Kielce and the Polish national team.

He started playing handball in his hometown at Anilana Łódź, where he played in the Polish 2nd tier in the 2018/19 and 2019/2020 seasons. In 2020 he joined Piotrkowianin Piotrków Trybunalski. For the 2023/2024 he signed for Polish champions Industria Kielce on a four year deal, but was immediately loaned to league rivals Gwardia Opole for the season.

He debuted on the Polish national team on December 28th 2021 in a 26-30 home field defeat to Tunisia.
