= Jan Klimków =

Polish handball player (born 1998)

Personal information
- Nationality: Polish
- Born: 21 December 1998 (age 27) Grodków, Poland
- Height: 2.03 m (6 ft 8 in)

Sport
- Sport: Handball
- Position: Pivot
- Current club: Gwardia Opole
- Number: 10

Youth career
- Years: Team
- –: Olimp Grodków

Senior clubs
- Years: Team
- –: Gwardia Opole
- –: Dunkerque HGL
- 2024–2025: RK Nexe Našice
- 2025–: MKS Kalisz
National team
Years	Team	Apps	(Gls)
–	Poland	5	(1)

Jan Klimków (born 21 December 1998) is a Polish handball player for Gwardia Opole and the Polish national team.
