= Michał Adamuszek =

Polish handball player (born 1986)

Personal information
- Nationality: Polish
- Born: 29 April 1986 (age 40) Dąbrowa Górnicza, Poland
- Height: 1.91 m (6 ft 3 in)

Sport
- Sport: Handball
- Position: Left back
- Current club: NMC Górnik Zabrze
- Number: 86

Senior clubs
- Years: Team
- 2002–2007: Viret Zawiercie
- 2007–2008: Miedź Legnica
- 2008–2010: MMTS Kwidzyn
- 2010–2011: Vive Kielce
- 2010–2011: → MMTS Kwidzyn (loan)
- 2011–2013: MMTS Kwidzyn
- 2013–2015: SPR Stal Mielec
- 2015: Śląsk Wrocław
- 2015–: NMC Górnik Zabrze
National team
Years	Team	Apps	(Gls)
2010–	Poland	4	(9)

Michał Adamuszek (born 29 April 1986) is a Polish handball player for NMC Górnik Zabrze and the Polish national team.
