= Łukasz Zakreta =

Polish handball player (born 1991)

Personal information
- Nationality: Polish
- Born: 25 February 1991 (age 35) Olsztyn, Poland
- Height: 1.95 m (6 ft 5 in)

Sport
- Sport: Handball
- Position: Goalkeeper
- Current club: Energa MKS Kalisz
- Number: 16

Senior clubs
- Years: Team
- 2009–2014: Szczypiorniak Olsztyn
- 2014–2017: Warmia Olsztyn
- 2017–: Energa MKS Kalisz
National team
Years	Team	Apps	(Gls)
2019–	Poland	5	(1)

Łukasz Zakreta (born 25 February 1991) is a Polish handball player for Energa MKS Kalisz and the Polish national team.
