= Dawid Fedeńczak =

Polish handball player (born 1998)

Personal information
- Nationality: Polish
- Born: 6 March 1998 (age 28) Nowogard, Poland
- Height: 1.85 m (6 ft 1 in)

Sport
- Sport: Handball
- Position: Right wing
- Current club: Pogoń Szczecin
- Number: 88

Youth career
- Years: Team
- –2015: CKS Szczecin

Senior clubs
- Years: Team
- 2015–: Pogoń Szczecin
National team
Years	Team	Apps	(Gls)
2020–	Poland	3	(2)

Dawid Fedeńczak (born 6 March 1998) is a Polish handball player for Pogoń Szczecin and the Polish national team.
