= Bartłomiej Jaszka =

Polish handball player and manager (born 1983)

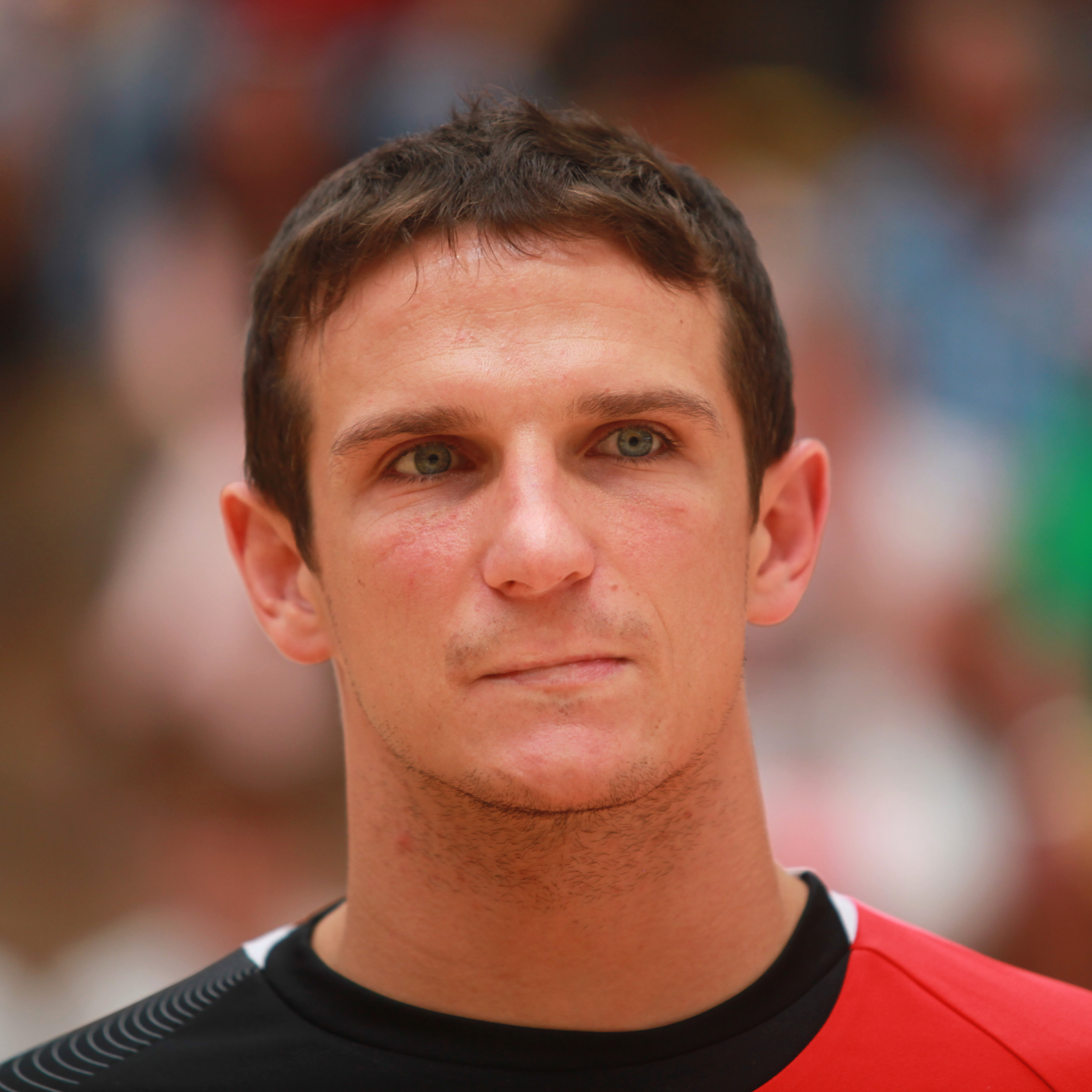

Personal information
- Nationality: Polish
- Born: 16 June 1983 (age 43) Ostrów Wielkopolski, Poland
- Height: 1.85 m (6 ft 1 in)

Sport
- Sport: Handball
- Position: Centre back
- Current club: Zagłębie Lubin (manager)

Senior clubs
- Years: Team
- –2003: Ostrovia Ostrów Wielkopolski
- 2003–2007: Zagłębie Lubin
- 2007–2016: Füchse Berlin
National team
Years	Team	Apps	(Gls)
2006–2014	Poland	152	(265)

Teams managed
- 2016–2017: Energa MKS Kalisz
- 2017–: Zagłębie Lubin
Medal record
World Championships
Bronze medal – third place	2009 Croatia	Team

Bartłomiej Jaszka (born 16 June 1983) is a former Polish handball player who is currently the manager of Zagłębie Lubin.

== Career ==
He participated at the 2008 Summer Olympics, where Poland finished fifth. He was also part of the Polish team, which won the bronze medal at the 2009 World Men's Handball Championship.
