= Rafał Kuptel =

Polish handball player and coach (born 1976)

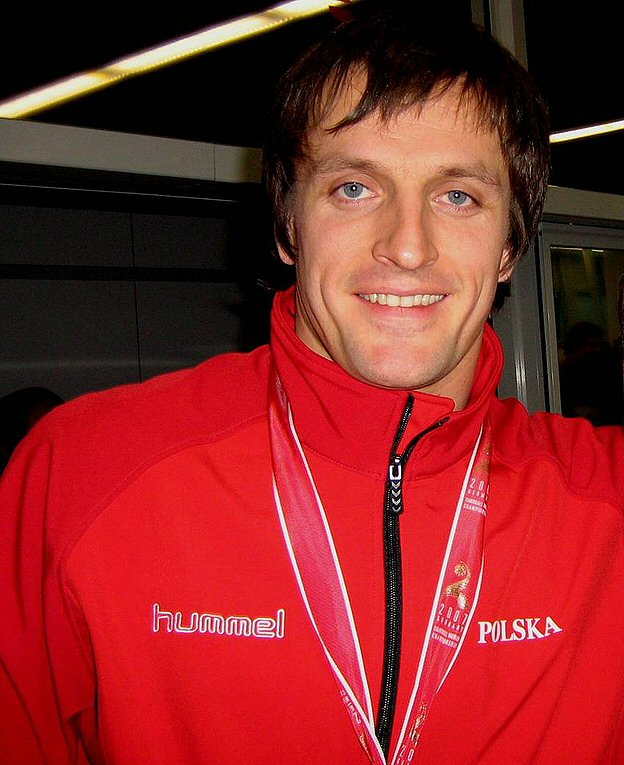

Personal information
- Nationality: Polish
- Born: April 1, 1976 (age 50) Iława, Poland
- Height: 1.92 m (6 ft 4 in)

Sport
- Sport: Handball
- Position: Centre back
- Current club: Gwardia Opole (manager)

Senior clubs
- Years: Team
- –1999: Spójnia Gdańsk
- 1999–2001: Wybrzeże Gdańsk
- 2001–2003: KS Warszawianka
- 2003–2011: Wisła Płock
- 2011–2013: Arka Gdynia
National team
Years	Team	Apps	(Gls)
1996–2008	Poland	145	(157)

Teams managed
- 2013–2014: Piotrkowianin Piotrków Trybunalski
- 2014–: Gwardia Opole
Medal record
World Championship
Silver medal – second place	2007 Germany

Rafał Kuptel (born 1 April 1976) is a retired Polish handball player and former coach of Gwardia Opole.

He is a silver medalist with the national team at the 2007 World Men's Handball Championship in Germany.

== Sporting achievements ==
=== State awards ===
- 2007 Gold Cross of Merit
