= Pogoń Prudnik =

KS Pogoń Prudnik
- Nickname: biało-niebiescy (white-blues)
- Leagues: I liga
- Founded: 1 October 1954
- Arena: Obuwnik Hall Prudnik
- Capacity: 1,600
- Location: Prudnik, Poland
- Team colors: Blue, white
- President: Dariusz Lis
- Head coach: Dominik Tomczyk
- Website: kspogonprudnik.pl
Home	Away

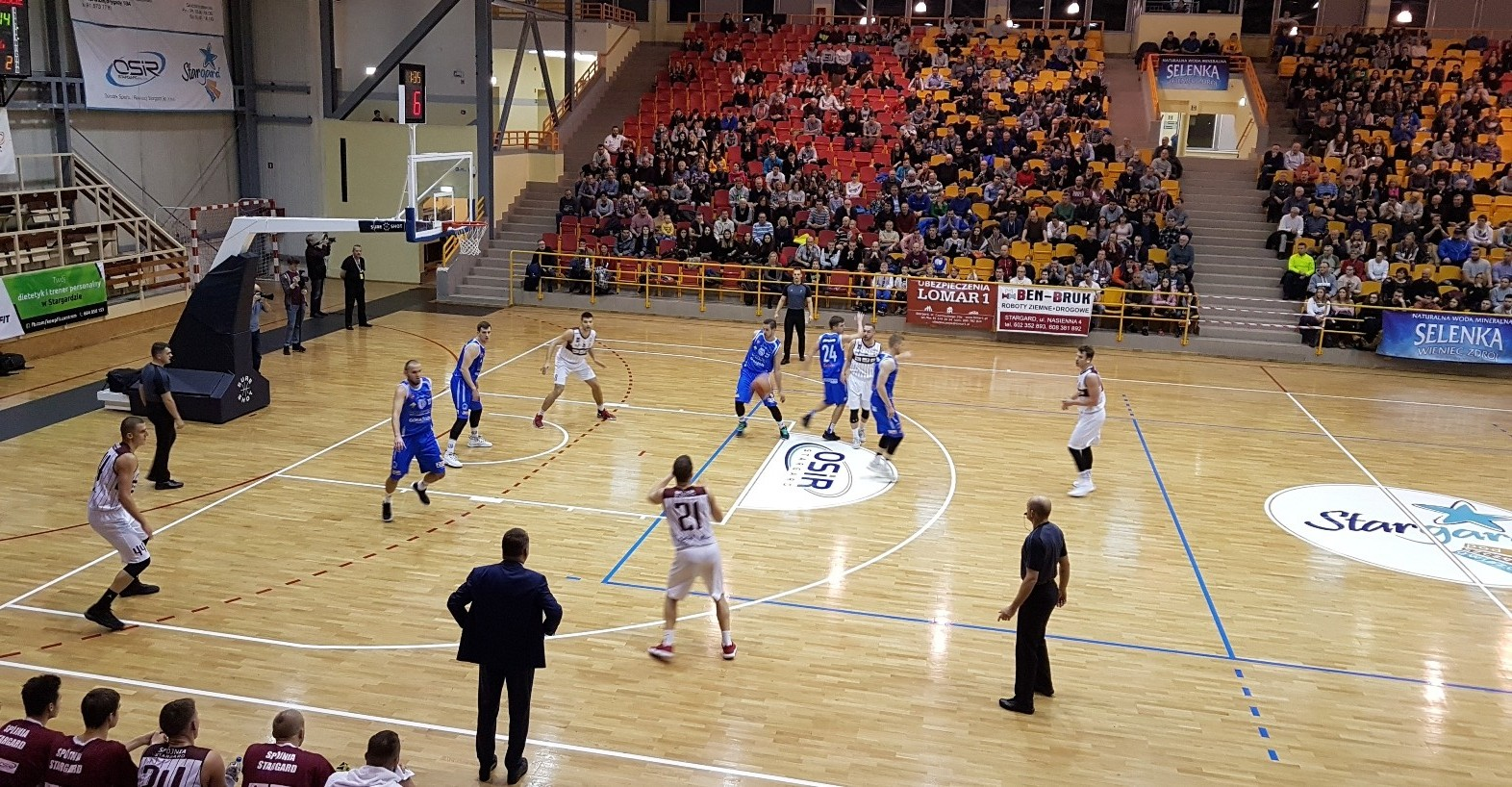
Pogoń Prudnik playing against Spójnia Stargard

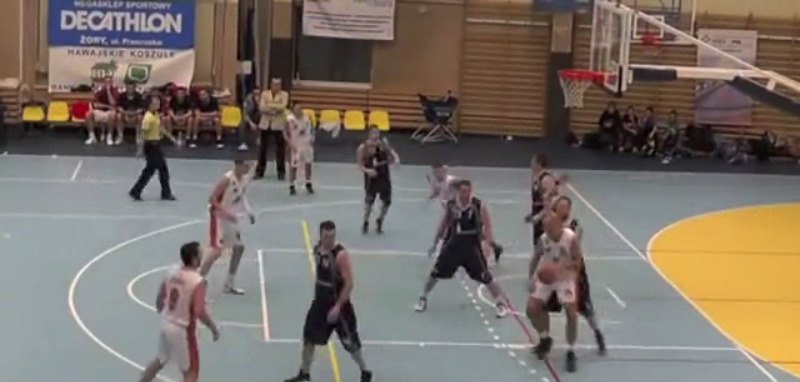
Pogoń Prudnik playing against Hawajskie Koszule Żory

Pogoń Prudnik (Polish pronunciation: [ˈpɔɡɔɲ ˈprudɲik]), also known as shortly Pogoń, is a Polish basketball team based in Prudnik. The club currently plays in the Polish national 1st basketball league since the 2014–15 season.

Pogoń hosts its games at the Obuwnik Sports Hall.

== Current roster ==
Pogoń Prudnik roster
Players
Coaches

Pos.	No.	Nat.	Name
PF	21	(Poland)	Antczak, Damian
PG	7	(Poland)	Krawczyk, Jakub
PG		(Poland)	Moczulski, Mateusz
PG	11	(Poland)	Mordzak, Grzegorz
F/C	14	(Poland)	Nowakowski, Tomasz
SF		(Poland)	Pisarczyk, Wojciech
PG	24	(Poland)	Prostak, Tomasz
F	13	(Poland)	Sroka, Marcin
SF	31	(Poland)	Stalicki, Kacper
PG	7	(Poland)	Szpyrka, Wojciech
SF		(Poland)	Topolski, Oliwer

Head coach

- (Poland) Tomasz Michalak

Assistant coach(es)

- (Poland) Maciej Maciejewski

Legend

- (C) Team captain
- Injured

- Roster

== Season by season ==
Season by season (1964–2017)
Season	League	Place
1964/65	II liga polska	4
1966/67	II liga polska	6
1968/69	II liga polska	10
1981/82	III liga polska	1 ▲
1982/83	II liga polska	6
1983/84	II liga polska	9
1984/85	II liga polska	3
1985/86	II liga polska	5
1986/87	II liga polska	4
1987/88	II liga polska	5
1988/89	II liga polska	5
1989/90	II liga polska	2
1990/91	II liga polska	7
1991/92	II liga polska	7
1992/93	II liga polska	3
1993/94	II liga polska	4
1994/95	II liga polska	4
1995/96	II liga polska	8
1996/97	II liga polska	12 ▼
1997/98	III liga śląska	10
1997/98	III liga śląska	3
1998/99	III liga śląska	1
1999/00	III liga opolska	1
2000/01	III liga donośląska	2
2001/02	III liga śląska	5
2002/03	III liga śląska	5 ▲
2003/04	II liga polska	12
2004/05	II liga polska	10
2005/06	II liga polska	7
2006/07	II liga polska	2
2007/08	II liga polska	4
2008/09	II liga polska	5
2009/10	II liga polska	9
2010/11	II liga polska	14
2011/12	II liga polska	4
2012/13	II liga polska	3
2013/14	II liga polska	4 ▲
2014/15	I liga polska	11
2015/16	I liga polska	7
2016/17	I liga polska	7
2017/18	I liga polska	13
