= Jerzy Adamuszek =

Polish geographer

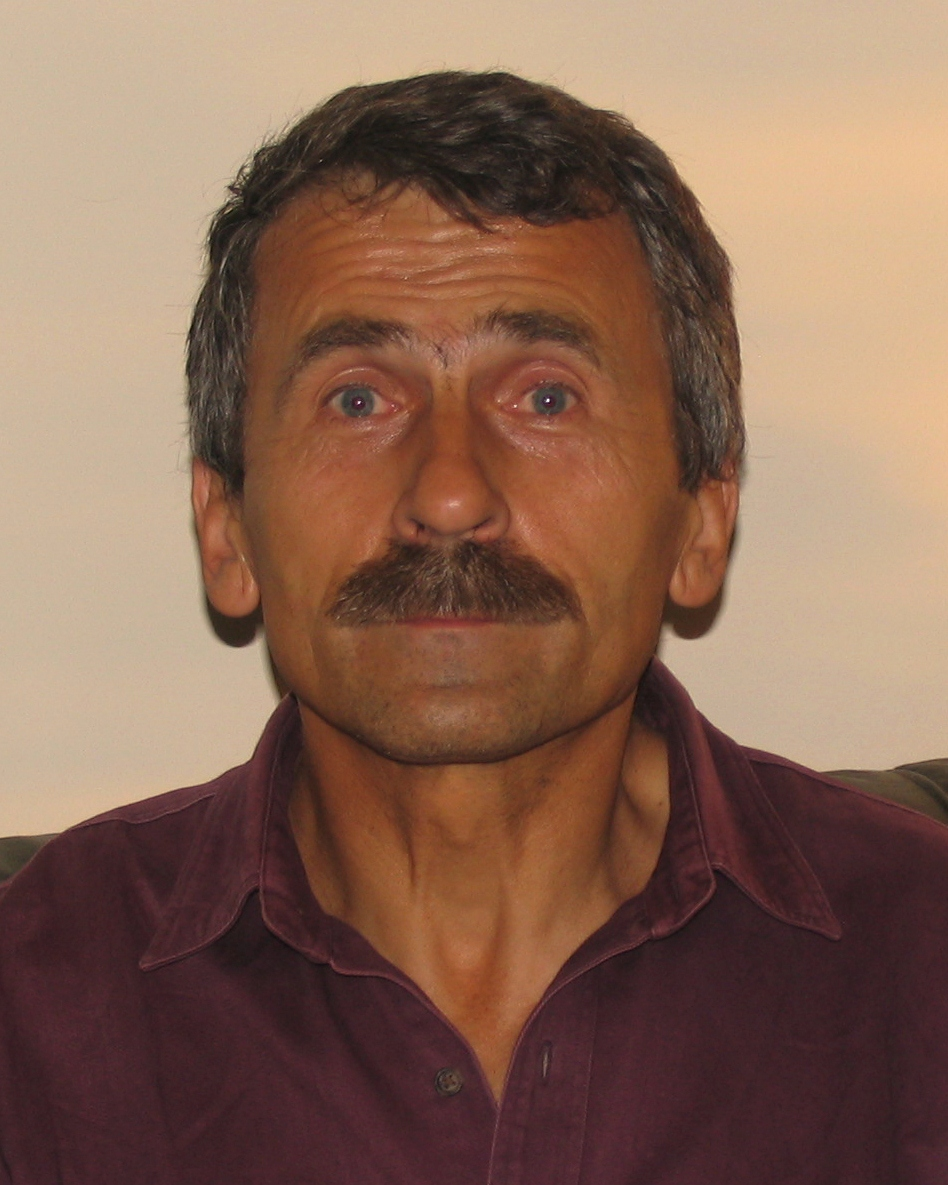
Jerzy Adamuszek

Jerzy Adamuszek (born 1955 in Klucze, Poland) is a geographer, adventurer and writer. He has lived in Montreal, Quebec, Canada since 1980.

== Biography ==
=== Early life and education ===
Adamuszek spent his childhood in Chechlo (near Olkusz), a village bordering Pustynia Bledowska which is part of Jura Krakowsko-Czestochowska. As a child, he spent much of his time poring over atlases, adventure books, and imagining himself in foreign lands. His youthful pastimes were science, sports, and painting. After the completion of Technical School of Gardening in Bielsko-Biala in 1974, he moved to Kraków to study geography at the Jagiellonian University. He received his master's degree in 1980.

=== Career ===
From this flurry of concentrated activity emerged a plan to undertake unique expeditions, mainly based on the sports at which he excelled. Working at a wide variety of jobs, as a land surveyor in Western Canada, making maps and city plans and delivering cars throughout the US and Canada, he was able at the same time to discover the new continent where he now lived. He began, and is organizing, two series of presentations in the Polish Consulate in Montreal.

- from 1994, called "Spotkania Podroznicze", with guest speakers on geographical topics, illustrated with films and slides (between 2001 - 2011, in co-operation with his friend).
- from 2007, called "Sa Wsrod Nas" (They are amongst us). His guests are interesting people from the Polish community.
- since 1994 he has been giving lectures, presentations, slide shows, and promotions of his books in: schools, libraries, and clubs in Poland, Canada, USA, and Australia (altogether, a few hundred presentations). In Canada (Chapters, Coles&Smith), and the USA (Barnes&Noble) he gave over 200 presentations of his book about Cuba.

== Achievements recognized by the Guinness Book of Records ==
- Solo Trans Americas Drive (40,370 km: Montreal – Alaska – Tierra del Fuego – Bolivia). The record distance from Alaska to Tierra del Fuego of 23,527 km driven in 18 days, 11 hours, 45 minutes.
- Discovery of the World's Longest Transcontinental Waterway linking the Beaufort Sea with the Gulf of Mexico (10,682 km).
- Confirmation that Montreal is the World's largest metropolitan city (in area), between two rivers (432 km^{2}). It is called Montreal Island.

== Published books ==
- "Wyrachowane Szalenstwo", Iskry 1994, (in Polish) about his solo Trans-Americas Drive to achieve a Guinness World Record.
- "Calculated Recklessness", in co-operation with D. Whitton, ready to publish.
- "Kuba to nie tylko Varadero", Yunia 1997, (in Polish) about cycling 1500 km around Cuba.
- "Cuba is not only Varadero", Yunia 1997, in cooperation with D. Whitton
- "Slonie na olejno", Yunia 2000, (in Polish), about his journeys throughout southern African countries.

== Articles ==
- "Cuba by bicycle": The Explorers Journal, volume 79, number 3, Fall 2001, page 20–29;

== Awards and honors ==
- 2007: Awarded by the President of Poland, the Silver Cross of Merit, Poland
- 1998: The honor citizen of his County, Klucze in Poland (Honorowy obywatel Gminy Klucze)

== Other major activities ==
- Traveled extensively throughout South and North America, Australia, Southern Africa, and the former Soviet Union.
- Crossed the Rocky Mountains by bicycle (2,300 km).
- Traveled from Montreal to New York by bicycle (630 km) and by kayak (580 km).
- Completed the Montreal annual Marathon five times.
- Navigated the Vistula River (1,059 km), the longest river in Poland, by kayak.
- Organized (1989–94) the annual mass event "By kayak & bicycle around the Island of Montreal" (122 km).
- Was a team member of the GM car race "Aurora Vacation Challenge" (10000 km, Detroit, LA)
- Participated twice in the expedition, "Sources of the Amazon 2000," sponsored by National Geographic.
- Was a team member in the "Strzelecki Traces Expedition – 2004," crossing Australia by jeep.
- Climbed the highest summit in the Western Hemisphere; Aconcagua (6,963 m asl) and Ecuador's volcanos; Cayambe and Cotopaxi (approx. 6,000 m asl).
- He is participating in a number of walking pilgrimages including Camino de Compostella (800 km).
- He has a project for several generations. Building the highest man-made mountain in the world. MONS PAX, Latin for "Peace Mountain".
