= Krzysztof Szczecina =

Polish handball player (born 1990)

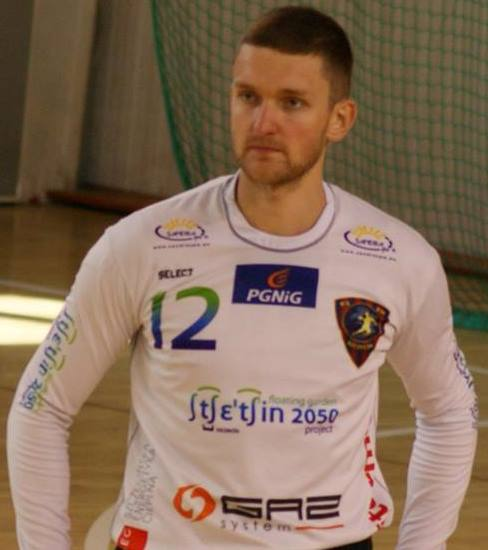

Personal information
- Nationality: Polish
- Born: 25 July 1990 (age 36) Kielce, Poland
- Height: 1.91 m (6 ft 3 in)

Sport
- Sport: Handball
- Position: Goalkeeper
- Current club: MMTS Kwidzyn
- Number: 12

Senior clubs
- Years: Team
- 2009–2015: Vive Kielce
- 2009–2010: → BKS Bochnia (loan)
- 2011–2014: → MMTS Kwidzyn (loan)
- 2014–2015: → Pogoń Szczecin (loan)
- 2015–2016: Śląsk Wrocław
- 2016–: MMTS Kwidzyn
National team
Years	Team	Apps	(Gls)
2013–	Poland	2	(0)

Krzysztof Szczecina (born 25 July 1990) is a Polish handball player for MMTS Kwidzyn and the Polish national team.
