= Gwardia Opole =

Polish handball club

Corotop KPR Gwardia Opole
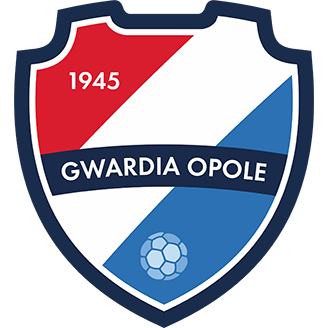
- Full name: Klub Piłki Ręcznej Gwardia Opole
- Founded: 1945; 81 years ago
- Arena: Stegu Arena
- Capacity: 3,378
- President: Paweł Dołhańczuk
- Head coach: Bartosz Jurecki
- Captain: Mateusz Jankowski
- League: Superliga
- 2021/22: 9th
- Club colours
Home	Away

Gwardia Opole is a men's handball club from Opole, Poland, that plays in the Superliga.

The current name of the club is Corotop Gwardia Opole due to sponsorship reasons.

Location of Gwardia Opole

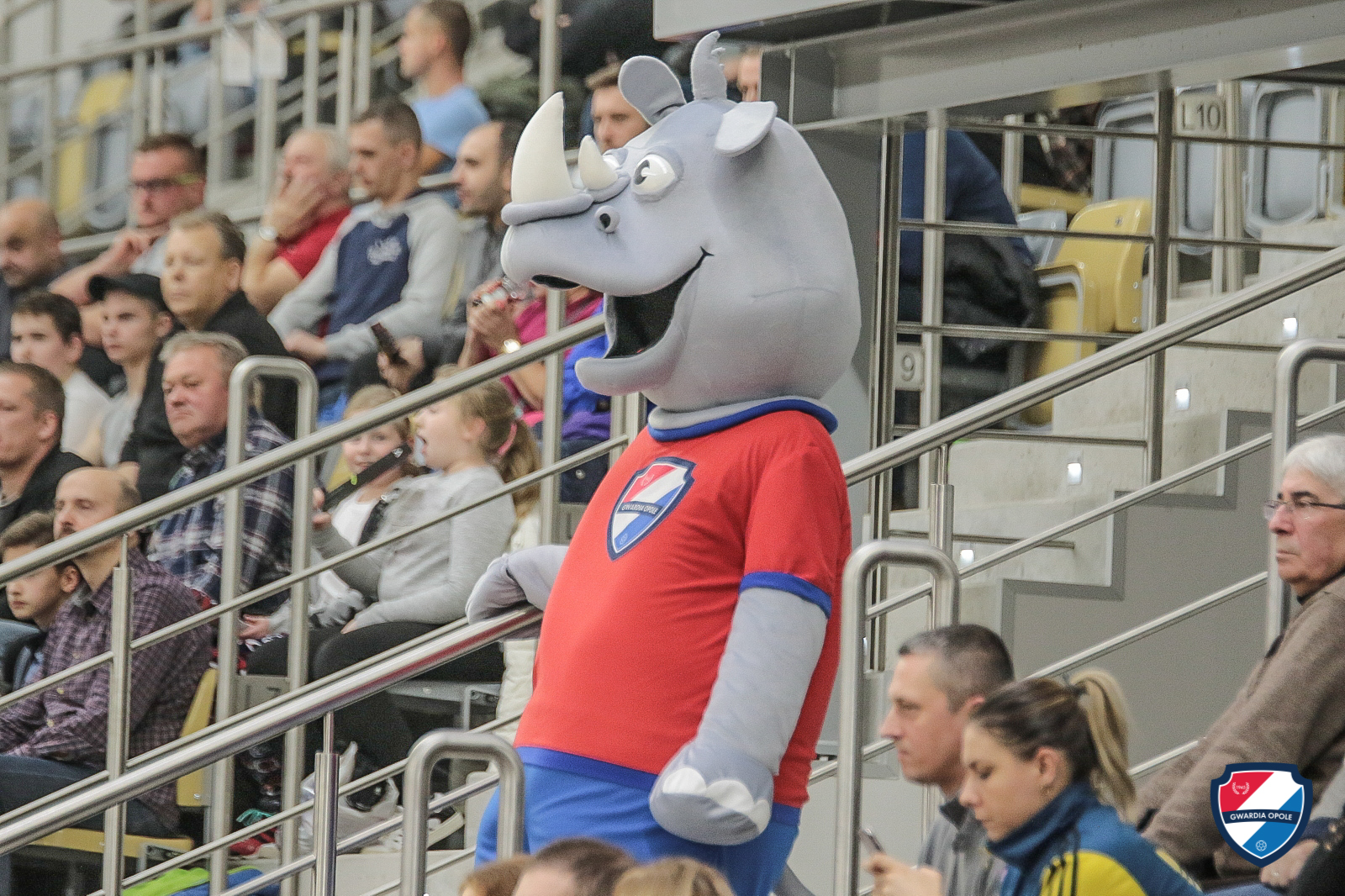
Gwardek – the official mascot of Gwardia Opole.

== History ==
The team was founded in 1945. In 1962, it was promoted to the first league. In the debut season in the top league, the club took 4th place. In the 1963/1964 season, the team led by Edward Hyla won the bronze medals in the Polish Championship (behind AZS Katowice and Sparta Katowice).

In the following years, Gwardia continued to play in the first league, but they were relegated in 1980. They returned to the top league after one year, where they won the 2nd league by eight points ahead of second-placed Posnania Poznań. In the 1981/1982 season, they were relegated to the second league again, where they spent the next ten years.

The Opole team returned to the first league in the 1992/1993 season - again only for one year - when coached by Henryk Zajączkowski. The club was in the third division in the 1997/1998 season, where it played for three consecutive years. In the 2002/2003 season, the Opole team won the second division and returned to the top division after 10 years. In the 2003/2004 season, the team won only two and drew three, thus relegating it to the first league. In the years 2004-2013, Gwardia played in the first league. In this period, he achieved second place twice (2006/2007, 2010/2011) and third place twice (2007/2008, 2011/2012). In the 2012/2013 season, when Marek Jagielski was the coach, the team won the first division and got promoted to the Superliga. In the 2013/2014 season, the team won five, drew one and lost 16, finishing 11th and relegated to the First Division. During the season, in December 2013, there was a change of coach: Marek Jagielski was replaced by Tadeusz Jednoróg.

In 2014, Rafał Kuptel became the new coach of Opole. In the 2014/2015 season, Gwardia dominated the second division: they won all 26 of their matches, thus once again promoted to the Superliga. The team's new home, the "Okraglak" hall, was handed over in September 2017, and since 2018 the facility has been called the Stegu Arena. In the 2017/2018 season, the team debuted on the international cup circuit, when they were eliminated in the third round against RD Koper of Slovenia in the EHF Cup. In the 2018/2019 season, Opole finished the regular season in 4th place. In the semifinals of the playoffs, they lost to the favorite Vive Kielce (32:31; 28:37). However, a one-goal victory (32:31) in the first meeting was a sensation: Gwardia's victory ended Kielce's 103-match winning streak since March 2016. In the race for 3rd place, Gwardia faced MMTS Kwidzyn. He lost the first match 25:26, but won the rematch 26:24 and won the bronze medal of the Polish championship. The team's top scorers in the 2018/2019 season: Patryk Mauer (149 goals), Mateusz Jankowski (120 goals) and Antoni Łangowski (116 goals). For the third time in a row, Adam Malcher received the award for the best goalkeeper in the league, and for the second time in a row, Rafał Kuptel was recognized as the best coach in the Superliga.

== Crest, colours, supporters ==
=== Kits ===
HOME
2017–18	2018–20

AWAY
2017–18	2018–19	2019–20

THIRD
2017–18	2019–20

== Sports Hall information ==
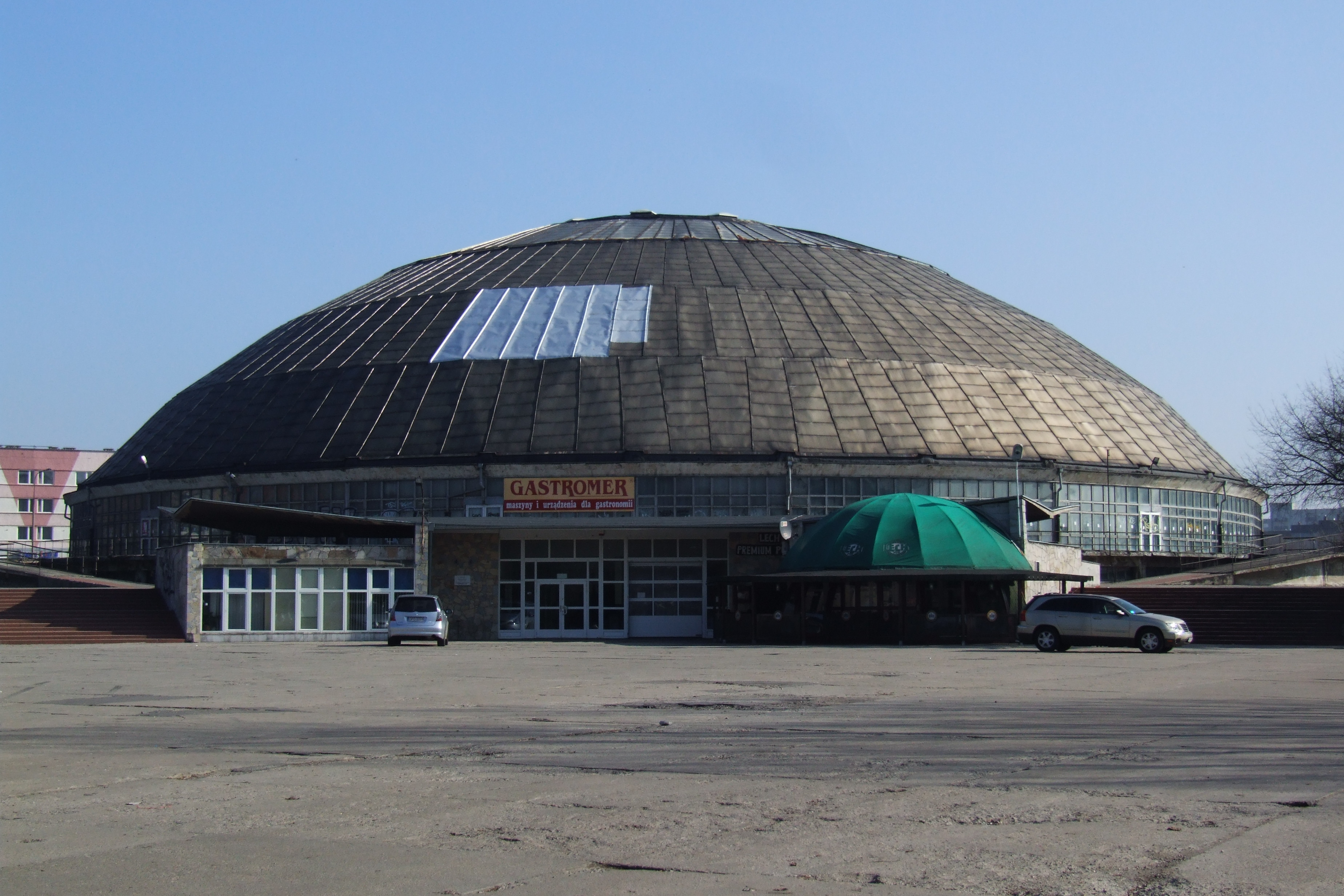
Home hall: Stegu Arena 2012

- Arena: - Stegu Arena
- City: - Opole
- Capacity: - 3378
- Address: - Oleska 72, 45-222 Opole, Poland.

== Management ==
Position	Name
President	(Poland) Paweł Dołhańczuk
Sports Director	(Poland) Tomasz Wróbel

== Team ==
=== Current squad ===
Squad for the 2025–26 season

Goalkeepers

- 1 (Poland) Jakub Ałaj
- 33 (Poland) Dawid Balcerek
- 40 (Poland) Fabian Sowiak

Left wingers

- 22 (Poland) Michał Milewski
- 23 (Poland) Kacper Aksamit
- 88 (Poland) Daniel Jendryca

Right wingers

- 7 (Poland) Mateusz Wojdan
- 14 (Poland) Szymon Romanowski

Line players

- 66 (Montenegro) Admir Pelidija
- 75 (Poland) Kelian Janikowski

Left backs

- 6 (Poland) Filip Wrzesiński
- 10 (Poland) Bartosz Kowalczyk
- 21 (Poland) Jakub Luksa

Centre backs

- 5 (Poland) Fabian Sosna
- 9 (Poland) Piotr Zawadzki
- 17 (Poland) Maciej Zarzycki
- 73 (Poland) Bartłomiej Rugała

Right backs

- 37 (Poland) Dominik Antoniak
- 99 (Poland) Oliwier Kamiński

=== Transfers ===
Transfers for the 2026–27 season

Joining

- (Romania) Dan Racoțea (LB) from (Poland) KS Azoty-Puławy
- (Ukraine) Dmytro Artemenko (LW) from (Poland) KS Azoty-Puławy
- (Croatia) Kajo Cikatić (LP) from (Croatia) MRK Čakovec
- (Poland) Daniel Wisiński (RB) from (Poland) KS Azoty-Puławy
- (Poland) Igor Szafryna (LP) from (Poland) Wisła Płock

Leaving

=== Transfer History ===
Transfers for the 2025–26 season

Joining

- (Poland) Bartosz Kowalczyk (CB) from (Poland) MKS Kalisz
- (Poland) Maciej Zarzycki (CB) from (Poland) KS Azoty-Puławy
- (Poland) Kelian Janikowski (LP) from (Poland) KS Azoty-Puławy
- (Poland) Dawid Balcerek (GK) from (Poland) KPR Legionowo
- (Poland) Fabian Sowiak (GK) (from (Poland) ASPR Zawadzkie)
- (Poland) Bartłomiej Rugała (CB) (from (Poland) SMS ZPRP Kielce)
- (Poland) Dominik Antoniak (RB) (from (Poland) AZS AWF Biała Podlaska)

Leaving

- (Poland) Andrzej Widomski (RB) to (North Macedonia) RK Eurofarm Pelister
- (Poland) Pawel Stempin (LP) to (Poland) MMTS Kwidzyn
- (Poland) Mateusz Lellek (GK) (to ?)
- (Poland) Adam Malcher (GK) (retires)
- (Poland) Antoni Łangowski (LB) (retires)
- (Poland) Marek Hryniewicz (RW) (retires)
- (Poland) Janusz Wandzel (LP) on loan at (Poland) Śląsk Wrocław
- (Poland) Piotr Jędraszczyk (CB) loan back to (Poland) Industria Kielce

== Previous squads ==
2018–2019 Team
Shirt No	Nationality	Player	Birth Date	Position
1	Poland	Mateusz Zembrzycki	18 March 1997 (age 29)	Goalkeeper
2	Poland	Michał Lemaniak	15 February 1997 (age 29)	Right Winger
5	Poland	Karol Siwak	29 August 1997 (age 29)	Left Winger
7	Poland	Maciej Zarzycki	26 July 1998 (age 28)	Central Back
8	Poland	Antoni Łangowski	19 April 1990 (age 36)	Left Back
10	Poland	Jan Klimków	21 December 1998 (age 27)	Line Player
12	Poland	Dawid Skrzypczyk	23 April 1998 (age 28)	Goalkeeper
13	Lithuania	Mindaugas Tarcijonas	20 September 1984 (age 42)	Line Player
14	Poland	Kamil Mokrzki	29 October 1991 (age 34)	Central Back
16	Poland	Adam Malcher	21 May 1986 (age 40)	Goalkeeper
17	Poland	Jędrzej Zieniewicz	2 April 1997 (age 29)	Right Back
18	Poland	Mateusz Jankowski	22 March 1988 (age 38)	Line Player
19	Poland	Przemysław Zadura	26 April 1988 (age 38)	Right Back
20	Poland	Wiktor Kawka	28 March 1996 (age 30)	Left Back
21	Poland	Patryk Mauer	2 September 1998 (age 28)	Right Winger
22	Poland	Michał Milewski	10 September 1998 (age 28)	Left Winger
23	Poland	Mateusz Morawski	12 May 1997 (age 29)	Central Back
27	Poland	Dariusz Skraburski	27 February 2000 (age 26)	Left Back

== Honours ==
- Polish Superliga:
  - Bronze (2): 1964, 2019
- Polish Cup:
  - Bronze (3): 2017, 2018, 2019

== EHF ranking ==
As of 22/10/2026

Rank	Team	Points
249	(Iceland) Selfoss	3
250	(Faroe Islands) Neistin	3
251	(Turkey) Sakarya BSB SK	3
252	(Poland) Gwardia Opole	3
253	(Norway) Bækkelagets SK	3
254	(Russia) Zenit Saint Petersburg	3
255	(North Macedonia) HC Prolet 62	3

== Former club members ==
=== Notable former players ===
The list includes players who have played at least once for their national team or spent at least 10 years with the team.

==== Goalkeepers ====
- (Poland) Władysław Fąfara
- (Poland) Paweł Malaka (1960–1976)
- (Poland) Adam Malcher (2003–2005, 2013–)
- (Poland) Andrzej Mientus (1976–1979)
- (Poland) Sebastian Suchowicz (2015)
- (Poland) Sławomir Szmal (1996–1997)
- (Poland) Robert Wasilewski (1982–1988, 2000–2003)
- (Poland) Mateusz Zembrzycki (2014–2016, 2017–2020)
- (Croatia) Vladimir Božić (2013)

==== Right wingers ====
- (Poland) Patryk Mauer (2017–2022)

==== Left wingers ====
- (Poland) Gerard Piechota (1973–1990)

==== Line players ====
- (Poland) Piotr Czaczka (1978–1982)
- (Poland) Mateusz Jankowski (2014–2019)
- (Poland) Jan Klimków (2017–2022)
- (Poland) Andrzej Sokołowski (1964–1968)
- (Lithuania) Mindaugas Tarcijonas (2015–2019)
- (Montenegro) Admir Pelidija (2024–)

==== Left backs ====
- (Poland) Kacper Adamski (2016–2017)
- (Poland) Antoni Łangowski (2015–2019, 2022–)
- (Poland) Piotr Przybecki (1987–1991)
- (Bosnia and Herzegovina) Ivan Milas (2015–2016)

==== Central backs ====
- (Poland) Piotr Jędraszczyk (2023–)
- (Poland) Kamil Mokrzki (2014–2020)
- (Poland) Maciej Zarzycki (2017–2022)

==== Right backs ====
- (Poland) Piotr Adamczak (2013–2014)
- (Poland) Ignacy Bąk (2016–2017)
- (Poland) Szymon Działakiewicz (2019–2021)
- (Poland) Jerzy Klempel (1970–1971)
- (Poland) Sebastian Rumniak (2014–2018)
- (Poland) Przemysław Zadura (2010–2012, 2016–2022)
- (Croatia) Nikola Kedžo (2015)
- (Ukraine) Roman Chychykalo (2022–2024)

=== Former coaches ===
Seasons	Coach	Country
2013–2014	Tadeusz Jednoróg	(Poland)
2014–2023	Rafał Kuptel	(Poland)
2023–	Bartosz Jurecki	(Poland)
