= Bartłomiej Tomczak =

Polish handball player (born 1985)

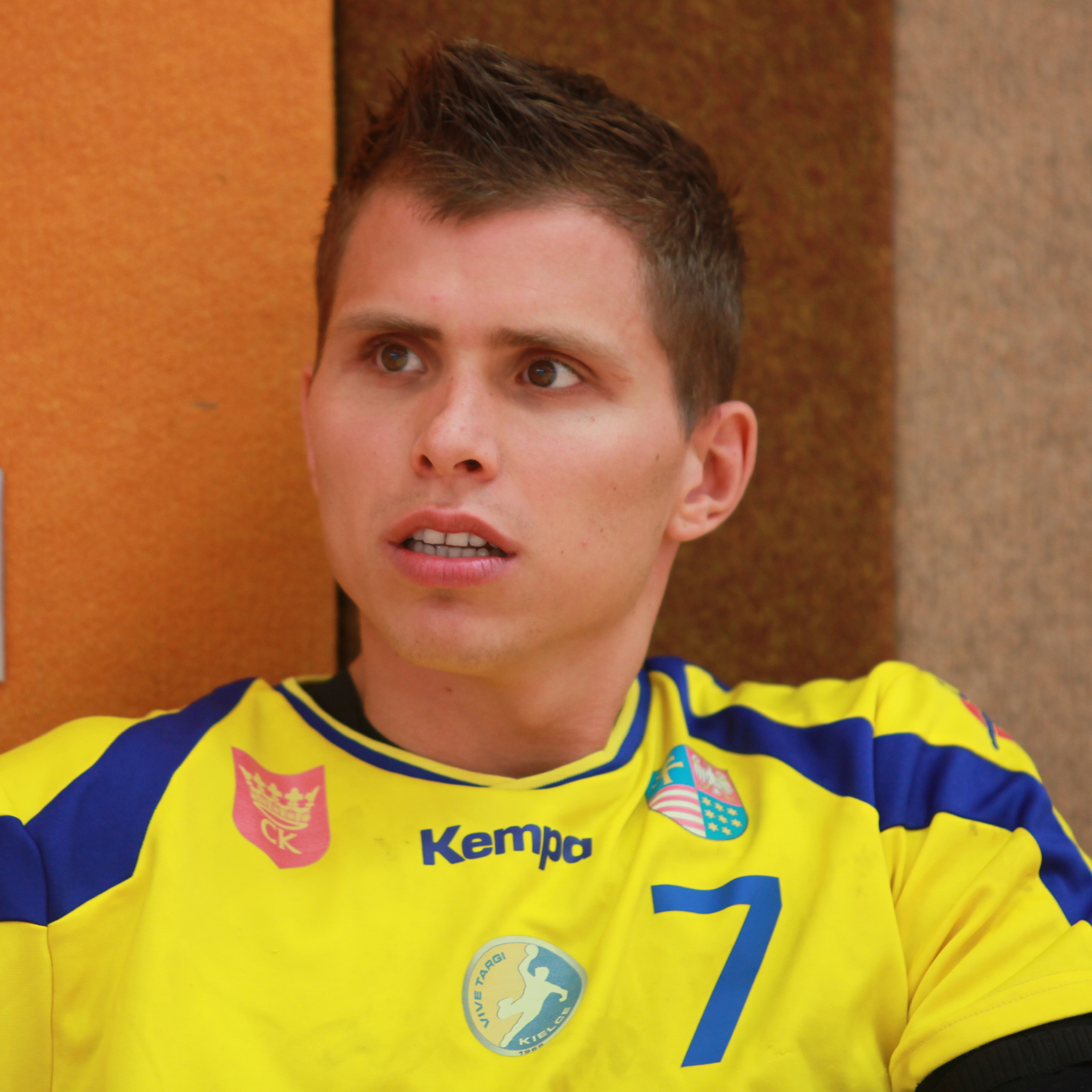

Personal information
- Full name: Bartłomiej Tomczak
- Nationality: Polish
- Born: September 7, 1985 (age 41) Ostrów Wielkopolski, Poland
- Height: 1.86 m (6 ft 1 in)

Sport
- Sport: Handball
- Position: Left Wing
- Current club: Energa MKS Kalisz
- Number: 7

Senior clubs
- Years: Team
- 2004–2011: Zagłębie Lubin
- 2011–2013: Vive Kielce
- 2013–2021: NMC Górnik Zabrze
- 2021–: Energa MKS Kalisz
National team
Years	Team	Apps	(Gls)
2007–	Poland	32	(64)

Bartłomiej Tomczak (born 7 September 1985 in Ostrów Wielkopolski) is a Polish team handball player, currently playing for Energa MKS Kalisz and on the Poland men's national handball team.
