= Przemysław Zadura =

Polish handball player (born 1988)

Personal information
- Nationality: Polish
- Born: 26 April 1988 (age 38) Opole, Poland
- Height: 1.98 m (6 ft 6 in)

Sport
- Sport: Handball
- Position: Right back
- Current club: Gwardia Opole
- Number: 19
National team
Years	Team	Apps	(Gls)
2013–	Poland	3	(0)

Przemysław Zadura (born 26 April 1988) is a Polish handball player for Gwardia Opole and the Polish national team.
