= SMS ZPRP Gdańsk =

Polish handball club

SMS Gdańsk
- Full name: Niepubliczne Liceum Ogólnokształcące. Szkoła Mistrzostwa Sportowego Związku Piłki Ręcznej w Polsce
- Short name: NLO SMS ZPRP Gdańsk
- Founded: 1997; 28 years ago
- Dissolved: July 2021; 3 years ago
- League: 1. Liga
- 2020–21: 9th of 11
- Club colours

SMS ZPRP Gdańsk was a men's handball team based in Gdańsk, Poland. SMS Gdańsk were one of three "Sports Championship Schools" in Poland run by the Poland Handball Federation.

== Handball and Education ==
The school itself focused on the education of its students, but also has a strong focus on the development of the students in handball. Due to the association of the club with the Poland Handball Federation the club could not be promoted to the Superliga, but also could not be relegated to the 2. Liga either, providing consistent competitiveness for the students. From the team's formation in 1997 until the school was closed in 2021, nearly 100 players went from playing and developing with SMS Gdańsk to playing in the Superliga, Poland's highest handball league.

Due to issues relating to having a sports hall for the club to train in, it was announced in 2019 that the NLO SMS ZPRP Gdańsk sports school was to be moved to Kwidzyn. After protests from the students it was announced that current students at the time would continue their studies in Gdańsk, while the new students would start their studies at NLO SMS ZPRP Kwidzyn. The club were dissolved at the end of the 2020–21 season after 24 years in operation.

== Seasons ==
SMS Gdańsk seasons from 2010 to 2021.

Season	Division	Pos.	Pld.	Pts.	W	D	L	GF	GA	GD
2010–11	1. Liga	10 of 12	22	14	7	0	15	706	743	-37
2011–12	1. Liga	12 of 12	22	9	3	3	16	603	672	-69
2012–13	1. Liga	7 of 13	24	25	11	3	10	661	655	+6
2013–14	1. Liga	11 of 14	26	14	7	0	19	663	781	-118
2014–15	1. Liga	12 of 14	26	17	8	1	17	685	757	-72
2015–16	1. Liga	12 of 14	26	17	8	1	17	715	778	-63
2016–17	1. Liga	10 of 14	26	22	10	2	14	722	760	-38
2017–18	1. Liga	11 of 15	28	36	12 (+2)	4*	12 (+2)	754	763	-9
2018–19	1. Liga	5 of 11	20	33	11	0	9	589	554	+35
2019–20	1. Liga	7 of 11	13	20	7 (+1)	1*	5	360	347	+13
2020–21	1. Liga	9 of 11	20	24	8	0	12	546	568	-22

Notes

- In the Polish Handball Leagues the points for wins has changed over time, with 2 pts for a win up until the 2016–17 season and 3 pts for a win from the 2017–18 season.
- Since the 2017–18 season penalty shootouts have been used to determine draws, where the winner of the shootouts will get 2 pts while the loser gains the normal 1 pt.
- The 2019–20 season was disrupted by the Covid-19 pandemic, with SMS playing only 13 of the expected 20 games, fewer than the other clubs in their group.
