= 2016–17 EHF Champions League knockout stage =

This article describes the knockout stage of the 2016–17 EHF Champions League.

== Qualified teams ==
The top six placed teams from each of the two groups advanced to the knockout stage.

| Group | Qualified for quarterfinals | Qualified for Round of 16 | | | | |
| Group | First place | Second place | Third place | Fourth place | Fifth place | Sixth place |
|---|---|---|---|---|---|---|
| A | (Spain) Barcelona Lassa | (France) Paris Saint-Germain | (Hungary) Telekom Veszprém | (Germany) Flensburg-Handewitt | (Germany) THW Kiel | (Denmark) Bjerringbro-Silkeborg |
| B | (North Macedonia) Vardar | (Poland) Vive Tauron Kielce | (Hungary) MOL-Pick Szeged | (Germany) Rhein-Neckar Löwen | (Belarus) Meshkov Brest | (Croatia) Zagreb |
| Playoff winners | (France) Montpellier (France) HBC Nantes | | | | | |

== Format ==
12 teams played home and away in the first knock-out phase, with the 10 teams qualified from groups A and B and the two teams qualified from groups C and D. After that, the six winners of these matches in the first knock-out phase joined with the winners of groups A and B to play home and away for the right to play in the final four.

== Round of 16 ==
=== Overview ===
| Team 1 | Agg. | Team 2 | 1st leg | 2nd leg |
|---|---|---|---|---|
| HBC Nantes (France) | 53–61 | (France) Paris Saint-Germain | 26–26 | 27–35 |
| Montpellier (France) | 61–54 | (Poland) Vive Tauron Kielce | 33–28 | 28–26 |
| Zagreb (Croatia) | 41–52 | (Hungary) Telekom Veszprém | 22–23 | 19–29 |
| Bjerringbro-Silkeborg (Denmark) | 48–59 | (Hungary) MOL-Pick Szeged | 24–26 | 24–33 |
| Meshkov Brest (Belarus) | 51–54 | (Germany) Flensburg-Handewitt | 25–26 | 26–28 |
| THW Kiel (Germany) | 50–49 | (Germany) Rhein-Neckar Löwen | 24–25 | 26–24 |

=== Matches ===
| 25 March 2017; 20:45 | HBC Nantes (France) | 26–26 | (France) Paris Saint-Germain | Parc des expositions de la Beaujoire, Nantes; Attendance: 4,500; Referees: Santos, Fonseca (POR) |
| 25 March 2017; 20:45 | Gurbindo 5 | (15–14) | Gensheimer 7 | Parc des expositions de la Beaujoire, Nantes; Attendance: 4,500; Referees: Santos, Fonseca (POR) |
| 25 March 2017; 20:45 | 3× (yellow card) | Report | 2× (yellow card) 5× (suspension) | Parc des expositions de la Beaujoire, Nantes; Attendance: 4,500; Referees: Santos, Fonseca (POR) |

| 1 April 2017; 17:00 | Paris Saint-Germain (France) | 35–27 | (France) HBC Nantes | Halle Georges Carpentier, Paris; Attendance: 2,914; Referees: Elíasson, Pálsson (ISL) |
| 1 April 2017; 17:00 | Remili 10 | (15–13) | Balaguer 10 | Halle Georges Carpentier, Paris; Attendance: 2,914; Referees: Elíasson, Pálsson (ISL) |
| 1 April 2017; 17:00 | 3× (yellow card) 5× (suspension) | Report | 3× (yellow card) 2× (suspension) | Halle Georges Carpentier, Paris; Attendance: 2,914; Referees: Elíasson, Pálsson (ISL) |

Paris Saint-Germain won 61–53 on aggregate.

| 26 March 2017; 17:00 | Montpellier (France) | 33–28 | (Poland) Vive Tauron Kielce | Palais des sports René Bougnol, Montpellier; Attendance: 3,100; Referees: Gjeding, Hansen (DEN) |
| 26 March 2017; 17:00 | Dolenec, Simonet 8 | (14–16) | Bielecki 6 | Palais des sports René Bougnol, Montpellier; Attendance: 3,100; Referees: Gjeding, Hansen (DEN) |
| 26 March 2017; 17:00 | 3× (yellow card) 3× (suspension) | Report | 2× (yellow card) 3× (suspension) | Palais des sports René Bougnol, Montpellier; Attendance: 3,100; Referees: Gjeding, Hansen (DEN) |

| 2 April 2017; 18:00 | Vive Tauron Kielce (Poland) | 26–28 | (France) Montpellier | Hala Legionów, Kielce; Attendance: 4,200; Referees: Gubica, Milošević (CRO) |
| 2 April 2017; 18:00 | Jurecki 7 | (15–11) | Dolenec 7 | Hala Legionów, Kielce; Attendance: 4,200; Referees: Gubica, Milošević (CRO) |
| 2 April 2017; 18:00 | 3× (yellow card) 3× (suspension) | Report | 3× (yellow card) 3× (suspension) | Hala Legionów, Kielce; Attendance: 4,200; Referees: Gubica, Milošević (CRO) |

Montpellier won 61–54 on aggregate.

| 25 March 2017; 18:00 | Zagreb (Croatia) | 22–23 | (Hungary) Telekom Veszprém | Arena Zagreb, Zagreb; Attendance: 12,250; Referees: Dentz, Reibel (FRA) |
| 25 March 2017; 18:00 | Pavlović, Valčić 4 | (10–12) | Marguč, Sulić 4 | Arena Zagreb, Zagreb; Attendance: 12,250; Referees: Dentz, Reibel (FRA) |
| 25 March 2017; 18:00 | 2× (yellow card) 3× (suspension) | Report | 3× (yellow card) 4× (suspension) | Arena Zagreb, Zagreb; Attendance: 12,250; Referees: Dentz, Reibel (FRA) |

| 1 April 2017; 17:30 | Telekom Veszprém (Hungary) | 29–19 | (Croatia) Zagreb | Veszprém Aréna, Veszprém; Attendance: 5,019; Referees: Horáček, Novotný (CZE) |
| 1 April 2017; 17:30 | three players 5 | (15–9) | three players 3 | Veszprém Aréna, Veszprém; Attendance: 5,019; Referees: Horáček, Novotný (CZE) |
| 1 April 2017; 17:30 | 3× (yellow card) 4× (suspension) 1× (red card) | Report | 3× (yellow card) 2× (suspension) | Veszprém Aréna, Veszprém; Attendance: 5,019; Referees: Horáček, Novotný (CZE) |

Telekom Veszprém won 52–41 on aggregate.

| 26 March 2017; 16:50 | Bjerringbro-Silkeborg (Denmark) | 24–26 | (Hungary) MOL-Pick Szeged | Silkeborg-Hallerne, Silkeborg; Attendance: 2,202; Referees: Pichon, Reveret (FRA) |
| 26 March 2017; 16:50 | Markussen 8 | (13–8) | Balogh, Gorbok 6 | Silkeborg-Hallerne, Silkeborg; Attendance: 2,202; Referees: Pichon, Reveret (FRA) |
| 26 March 2017; 16:50 | 2× (yellow card) 5× (suspension) | Report | 2× (yellow card) 4× (suspension) 1× (red card) | Silkeborg-Hallerne, Silkeborg; Attendance: 2,202; Referees: Pichon, Reveret (FRA) |

| 2 April 2017; 17:00 | MOL-Pick Szeged (Hungary) | 33–24 | (Denmark) Bjerringbro-Silkeborg | Városi Sportcsarnok, Szeged; Attendance: 3,200; Referees: Krstič, Ljubič (SLO) |
| 2 April 2017; 17:00 | three players 7 | (14–16) | Skube 6 | Városi Sportcsarnok, Szeged; Attendance: 3,200; Referees: Krstič, Ljubič (SLO) |
| 2 April 2017; 17:00 | 3× (yellow card) 4× (suspension) | Report | 3× (yellow card) 5× (suspension) | Városi Sportcsarnok, Szeged; Attendance: 3,200; Referees: Krstič, Ljubič (SLO) |

Pick Szeged won 59–48 on aggregate.

| 26 March 2017; 17:00 | Meshkov Brest (Belarus) | 25–26 | (Germany) Flensburg-Handewitt | Universal Sports Complex Victoria, Brest; Attendance: 3,740; Referees: Dobrovits, Tájok (HUN) |
| 26 March 2017; 17:00 | Krištopāns 5 | (13–15) | Svan 5 | Universal Sports Complex Victoria, Brest; Attendance: 3,740; Referees: Dobrovits, Tájok (HUN) |
| 26 March 2017; 17:00 | 3× (yellow card) | Report | 1× (yellow card) 2× (suspension) | Universal Sports Complex Victoria, Brest; Attendance: 3,740; Referees: Dobrovits, Tájok (HUN) |

| 2 April 2017; 19:30 | Flensburg-Handewitt (Germany) | 28–26 | (Belarus) Meshkov Brest | Flens-Arena, Flensburg; Attendance: 4,819; Referees: López, Ramírez (ESP) |
| 2 April 2017; 19:30 | Schmidt 7 | (13–13) | Stojković 8 | Flens-Arena, Flensburg; Attendance: 4,819; Referees: López, Ramírez (ESP) |
| 2 April 2017; 19:30 | 3× (yellow card) 3× (suspension) | Report | 3× (yellow card) 3× (suspension) | Flens-Arena, Flensburg; Attendance: 4,819; Referees: López, Ramírez (ESP) |

Flensburg-Handewitt won 54–51 on aggregate.

| 22 March 2017; 18:30 | THW Kiel (Germany) | 24–25 | (Germany) Rhein-Neckar Löwen | Sparkassen-Arena, Kiel; Attendance: 9,986; Referees: Marín, García (ESP) |
| 22 March 2017; 18:30 | Bilyk 7 | (10–12) | Ekdahl du Rietz 6 | Sparkassen-Arena, Kiel; Attendance: 9,986; Referees: Marín, García (ESP) |
| 22 March 2017; 18:30 | 3× (yellow card) 3× (suspension) | Report | 2× (yellow card) 1× (suspension) | Sparkassen-Arena, Kiel; Attendance: 9,986; Referees: Marín, García (ESP) |

| 30 March 2017; 19:00 | Rhein-Neckar Löwen (Germany) | 24–26 | (Germany) THW Kiel | SAP Arena, Mannheim; Attendance: 10,712; Referees: Nikolov, Nachevski (MKD) |
| 30 March 2017; 19:00 | Ekdahl du Rietz 6 | (12–12) | Bilyk, Vujin 5 | SAP Arena, Mannheim; Attendance: 10,712; Referees: Nikolov, Nachevski (MKD) |
| 30 March 2017; 19:00 | 3× (yellow card) 2× (suspension) | Report | 3× (yellow card) 4× (suspension) 1× (red card) | SAP Arena, Mannheim; Attendance: 10,712; Referees: Nikolov, Nachevski (MKD) |

THW Kiel won 50–49 on aggregate.

== Quarterfinals ==
| Team 1 | Agg. | Team 2 | 1st leg | 2nd leg |
|---|---|---|---|---|
| THW Kiel (Germany) | 46–49 | (Spain) Barcelona Lassa | 28–26 | 18–23 |
| Flensburg-Handewitt (Germany) | 51–61 | (North Macedonia) Vardar | 24–26 | 27–35 |
| MOL-Pick Szeged (Hungary) | 57–60 | (France) Paris Saint-Germain | 27–30 | 30–30 |
| Telekom Veszprém (Hungary) | 56–48 | (France) Montpellier | 26–23 | 30–25 |

=== Matches ===
| 23 April 2017; 17:30 | Kiel (Germany) | 28–26 | (Spain) Barcelona Lassa | Sparkassen-Arena, Kiel; Attendance: 10,205; Referees: Sondors, Līcis (LAT) |
| 23 April 2017; 17:30 | Vujin 10 | (16–15) | Entrerríos 4 | Sparkassen-Arena, Kiel; Attendance: 10,205; Referees: Sondors, Līcis (LAT) |
| 23 April 2017; 17:30 | 3× (yellow card) 3× (suspension) 1× (red card) | Report | 2× (yellow card) 4× (suspension) | Sparkassen-Arena, Kiel; Attendance: 10,205; Referees: Sondors, Līcis (LAT) |

| 29 April 2017; 18:30 | Barcelona Lassa (Spain) | 23–18 | (Germany) Kiel | Palau Blaugrana, Barcelona; Attendance: 7,083; Referees: Jurinović, Mrvica (CRO) |
| 29 April 2017; 18:30 | Rivera 7 | (13–9) | Ekberg, Vujin 4 | Palau Blaugrana, Barcelona; Attendance: 7,083; Referees: Jurinović, Mrvica (CRO) |
| 29 April 2017; 18:30 | 2× (yellow card) 2× (suspension) | Report | 3× (yellow card) 2× (suspension) | Palau Blaugrana, Barcelona; Attendance: 7,083; Referees: Jurinović, Mrvica (CRO) |

Barcelona won 49–46 on aggregate.

| 22 April 2017; 17:30 | Flensburg-Handewitt (Germany) | 24–26 | (North Macedonia) Vardar | Flens-Arena, Flensburg; Attendance: 4,837; Referees: Krstič, Ljubič (SLO) |
| 22 April 2017; 17:30 | Jakobsson 6 | (9–15) | three players 5 | Flens-Arena, Flensburg; Attendance: 4,837; Referees: Krstič, Ljubič (SLO) |
| 22 April 2017; 17:30 | 3× (yellow card) 4× (suspension) | Report | 3× (yellow card) 6× (suspension) | Flens-Arena, Flensburg; Attendance: 4,837; Referees: Krstič, Ljubič (SLO) |

| 27 April 2017; 19:00 | Vardar (North Macedonia) | 35–27 | (Germany) Flensburg-Handewitt | Jane Sandanski Arena, Skopje; Attendance: 6,500; Referees: Gjeding, Hansen (DEN) |
| 27 April 2017; 19:00 | Cindrić 7 | (15–10) | Eggert 8 | Jane Sandanski Arena, Skopje; Attendance: 6,500; Referees: Gjeding, Hansen (DEN) |
| 27 April 2017; 19:00 | 2× (yellow card) 3× (suspension) | Report | 3× (yellow card) 5× (suspension) 1× (red card) | Jane Sandanski Arena, Skopje; Attendance: 6,500; Referees: Gjeding, Hansen (DEN) |

Vardar won 61–51 on aggregate.

| 23 April 2017; 17:00 | MOL-Pick Szeged (Hungary) | 27–30 | (France) Paris Saint-Germain | Városi Sportcsarnok, Szeged; Attendance: 3,200; Referees: Dinu, Din (ROU) |
| 23 April 2017; 17:00 | Rodriguez 6 | (14–16) | Hansen, Karabatić 7 | Városi Sportcsarnok, Szeged; Attendance: 3,200; Referees: Dinu, Din (ROU) |
| 23 April 2017; 17:00 | 3× (yellow card) 4× (suspension) | Report | 2× (yellow card) 9× (suspension) | Városi Sportcsarnok, Szeged; Attendance: 3,200; Referees: Dinu, Din (ROU) |

| 29 April 2017; 20:45 | Paris Saint-Germain (France) | 30–30 | (Hungary) MOL-Pick Szeged | Halle Georges Carpentier, Paris; Attendance: 3,800; Referees: Nikolić, Stojković (SRB) |
| 29 April 2017; 20:45 | Hansen, Karabatić 6 | (16–17) | Balogh 8 | Halle Georges Carpentier, Paris; Attendance: 3,800; Referees: Nikolić, Stojković (SRB) |
| 29 April 2017; 20:45 | 3× (yellow card) 3× (suspension) | Report | 3× (yellow card) 4× (suspension) | Halle Georges Carpentier, Paris; Attendance: 3,800; Referees: Nikolić, Stojković (SRB) |

Paris Saint-Germain won 60–57 on aggregate.

| 22 April 2017; 17:30 | Telekom Veszprém (Hungary) | 26–23 | (France) Montpellier | Veszprém Aréna, Veszprém; Attendance: 5,019; Referees: López, Ramírez (ESP) |
| 22 April 2017; 17:30 | Nagy, Pálmarsson 6 | (13–10) | Porte 5 | Veszprém Aréna, Veszprém; Attendance: 5,019; Referees: López, Ramírez (ESP) |
| 22 April 2017; 17:30 | 3× (yellow card) 6× (suspension) 1× (red card) | Report | 2× (yellow card) 4× (suspension) 1× (red card) | Veszprém Aréna, Veszprém; Attendance: 5,019; Referees: López, Ramírez (ESP) |

| 30 April 2017; 18:30 | Montpellier (France) | 25–30 | (Hungary) Telekom Veszprém | Park&Suites Arena, Montpellier; Attendance: 3,200; Referees: Geipel, Heibig (GER) |
| 30 April 2017; 18:30 | Dolenec 9 | (15–11) | Pálmarsson 7 | Park&Suites Arena, Montpellier; Attendance: 3,200; Referees: Geipel, Heibig (GER) |
| 30 April 2017; 18:30 | 3× (yellow card) 2× (suspension) | Report | 3× (yellow card) 4× (suspension) 1× (red card) | Park&Suites Arena, Montpellier; Attendance: 3,200; Referees: Geipel, Heibig (GER) |

Telekom Veszprém won 56–48 on aggregate.

== Final four ==
The final four was held at the Lanxess Arena in Cologne, Germany on 3 and 4 June 2017.

The draw was held on 2 May 2017 in Cologne, Germany at 12:00.

=== Bracket ===
Semifinals
3 June
(Hungary) Telekom Veszprém | 26
(France) Paris Saint-Germain | 27
3 June
(North Macedonia) Vardar | 26
(Spain) Barcelona Lassa | 25

Final
4 June
(France) Paris Saint-Germain | 23
(North Macedonia) Vardar | 24
Third place
4 June
(Hungary) Telekom Veszprém | 34
(Spain) Barcelona Lassa | 30

=== Semifinals ===
| 3 June 2017; 15:15 | Telekom Veszprém (Hungary) | 26–27 | (France) Paris Saint-Germain | Lanxess Arena, Cologne; Attendance: 19,750; Referees: Nikolov, Nachevski (MKD) |
| 3 June 2017; 15:15 | Nagy 6 | (11–11) | Gensheimer, Hansen 7 | Lanxess Arena, Cologne; Attendance: 19,750; Referees: Nikolov, Nachevski (MKD) |
| 3 June 2017; 15:15 | 3× (yellow card) 3× (suspension) | Report | 3× (yellow card) 2× (suspension) | Lanxess Arena, Cologne; Attendance: 19,750; Referees: Nikolov, Nachevski (MKD) |

| 3 June 2017; 18:00 | Vardar (North Macedonia) | 26–25 | (Spain) Barcelona Lassa | Lanxess Arena, Cologne; Attendance: 19,750; Referees: Horáček, Novotný (CZE) |
| 3 June 2017; 18:00 | Čupić, Dujshebaev 7 | (13–12) | Lazarov 6 | Lanxess Arena, Cologne; Attendance: 19,750; Referees: Horáček, Novotný (CZE) |
| 3 June 2017; 18:00 | 3× (yellow card) 3× (suspension) | Report | 2× (yellow card) 5× (suspension) | Lanxess Arena, Cologne; Attendance: 19,750; Referees: Horáček, Novotný (CZE) |

=== Third place game ===
| 4 June 2017; 15:15 | Telekom Veszprém (Hungary) | 34–30 | (Spain) Barcelona Lassa | Lanxess Arena, Cologne; Attendance: 19,750; Referees: Gubica, Milošević (CRO) |
| 4 June 2017; 15:15 | Pálmarsson 8 | (18–17) | N'Guessan 6 | Lanxess Arena, Cologne; Attendance: 19,750; Referees: Gubica, Milošević (CRO) |
| 4 June 2017; 15:15 | 3× (yellow card) 3× (suspension) | Report | 2× (yellow card) 2× (suspension) | Lanxess Arena, Cologne; Attendance: 19,750; Referees: Gubica, Milošević (CRO) |

=== Final ===
| 4 June 2017; 18:00 | Paris Saint-Germain (France) | 23–24 | (North Macedonia) Vardar | Lanxess Arena, Cologne; Attendance: 19,750; Referees: Geipel, Helbig (GER) |
| 4 June 2017; 18:00 | Karabatić 5 | (12–11) | Dibirov 6 | Lanxess Arena, Cologne; Attendance: 19,750; Referees: Geipel, Helbig (GER) |
| 4 June 2017; 18:00 | 2× (yellow card) 4× (suspension) | Report | 2× (yellow card) 4× (suspension) | Lanxess Arena, Cologne; Attendance: 19,750; Referees: Geipel, Helbig (GER) |
