= 2016–17 EHF Cup =

European handball tournament

EHF Cup
- 2016–17

Tournament information
- Sport: Handball
- Dates: 2 September 2016–21 May 2017
- Host(s): Frisch Auf Göppingen (final four)
- Venue(s): EWS Arena (final four)
- Teams: 57+6 (qualification stage); 16 (group stage)

Final positions
- Champions: (Germany) Frisch Auf Göppingen
- Runner-up: (Germany) Füchse Berlin

Tournament statistics
- MVP: (Slovenia) Primož Prošt
- Top scorer(s): (Denmark) Hans Lindberg (92 goals)

The 2016–17 EHF Cup is the 36th edition of the EHF Cup, the second most important European handball club competition organised by the European Handball Federation (EHF), and the fifth edition since the merger with the EHF Cup Winners' Cup.

== Team allocation ==
=== Federation ranking ===
For the 2016–17 EHF Cup, the national federations were allocated places according to their 2016–17 EHF country ranking, which takes into account their performance in European competitions from 2012–13 to 2014–15.

Apart from the allocation based on the country coefficients, federations may have more or less teams participating in the EHF Cup, as noted below:

- (TH) – Additional berth for 2015–16 EHF Cup title holders
- (CL) – Berth transferred from or to 2016–17 EHF Champions League
- (CC) – Berth transferred from 2016–17 EHF Challenge Cup

Rank	Federation	Coeff.	Teams	Notes
1	Germany	154.83	3	+1 (TH)
2	Spain	122.83	3	
3	Hungary	103.33	3	
4	France	75.33	3	
5	Denmark	70.00	3	
6	Poland	54.22	3	−1 (CL)
7	Slovenia	54.00	3	
8	(North Macedonia) Macedonia	40.56	2	−1 (CL)
9	Romania	36.34	2	
10	Sweden	34.75	2	−1
11	Croatia	33.71	2	+1 (CC)
12	Russia	31.00	2	
13	Portugal	30.25	2	
14	Belarus	28.75	1	
15	Switzerland	22.33	1	+1 (CC)
16	Ukraine	21.78	1	
17	Norway	21.11	1	+1 (CC)

Rank	Federation	Coeff.	Teams	Notes
18	Serbia	20.44	1	+1 (CL)
19	Slovakia	13.56	1	
20	Turkey	13.00	1	
21	Luxembourg	11.13	1	
22	Finland	11.00	1	
23	Greece	11.00	1	+1 (CL)
24	Belgium	9.71	1	−1
25	Israel	9.00	1	
26	Austria	9.00	1	
27	Czech Republic	6.17	1	+1 (CL)
28	Bosnia and Herzegovina	5.78	1	−1
29	Kosovo	5.17	1	
30	Lithuania	4.83	1	−1
31	Italy	4.78	1	−1
32	Netherlands	4.75	1	+1 (CL)
33	Cyprus	4.33	1	−1
34	Estonia	4.17	1	

Rank	Federation	Coeff.	Teams	Notes
35	Bulgaria	3.50	1	−1
36	Iceland	3.29	1	
37	Montenegro	3.14	1	
38	Moldova	1.17	1	
39	(United Kingdom) Great Britain	1.00	1	
40	(Georgia (country)) Georgia	0.17	1	
41	Albania	0.00	0	
42	Andorra	0.00	0	
43	Armenia	0.00	0	
44	Azerbaijan	0.00	0	
45	Faroe Islands	0.00	0	
46	Republic of Ireland	0.00	0	
47	Latvia	0.00	0	
48	Liechtenstein	0.00	0	
49	Malta	0.00	0	
50	Monaco	0.00	0	

=== Distribution ===
	Teams entering in this round	Teams advancing from previous round
First qualifying round (30 teams)	1 sixth-placed team from federation 4; 2 fifth-placed teams from federations 3, 4; 3 fourth-placed teams from federations 8, 11, 12; 5 third-placed teams from federations 9, 11, 13, 15, 26; 8 runner-up teams from federations 16, 18, 20, 21, 23, 25, 27, 32; 10 champions from federations 18, 23, 29, 32, 34, 36–40; 1 domestic cup winner from federation 17	
Second qualifying round (32 teams)	3 fifth-placed teams from federations 1, 6, 17; 3 fourth-placed teams from federations 3, 5, 7; 1 third-placed team from federation 12; 7 runner-up teams from federations 9–11, 13–15, 19; 1 champion from federation 27; 2 fourth-placed teams from Champions League qualification stage	15 winners from the first qualifying round
Third qualifying round (32 teams)	Title holders; 2 fourth-placed teams from federations 1, 2; 5 third-placed teams from federations 2, 3, 5–7; 1 runner-up team from federation 4; 3 domestic cup winners/runners-up from federations 1, 2, 5; 2 third-placed teams from Champions League qualification stage; 2 runners-up from Champions League qualification stage	16 winners from the second qualifying round
Group stage (16 teams)		16 winners from the third qualifying round
Knockout phase (16 teams)		4 group winners from the group stage; 4 group runners-up from the group stage

=== Teams ===
The labels in the parentheses show how each team qualified for the place of its starting round:

- TH: Title holders
- 1st, 2nd, 3rd, 4th, 5th, 6th, etc.: League position
- CW: Domestic cup winners
- CR: Domestic cup runners-up
- CL QS: Losers from the Champions League qualification stage.

Third qualifying round
(Germany) Frisch Auf Göppingen (TH)	(Spain) Fraikin Granollers (4th)	(Denmark) GOG (3rd)	(Slovenia) RK Gorenje Velenje (CL QS)
(Germany) MT Melsungen (4th)	(Spain) Helvetia Anaitasuna (CR)	(Denmark) HC Midtjylland (CW)	(Finland) Riihimäki Cocks (CL QS)
(Germany) SC Magdeburg (CW)	(Hungary) Grundfos Tatabánya KC (3rd)	(Poland) KS Azoty-Puławy (3rd)	(Israel) Maccabi Tel Aviv (CL QS)
(Spain) CB Ademar León (3rd)	(France) Saint-Raphaël Var Handball (2nd)	(Slovenia) RD Ribnica (3rd)	(Austria) Bregenz Handball (CL QS)
Second qualifying round
(Germany) Füchse Berlin (5th)	(Romania) CSM București (2nd)	(Belarus) SKA Minsk (2nd)	(Luxembourg) Red Boys Differdange (CL QS)
(Hungary) Balatonfüredi KSE (4th)	(Sweden) Alingsås HK (2nd)	(Switzerland) Wacker Thun (2nd)	(Belgium) HC Achilles Bocholt (CL QS)
(Denmark) KIF Kolding København (4th)	(Croatia) RK Nexe Našice (2nd)	(Norway) ØIF Arendal (5th)	
(Poland) NMC Górnik Zabrze (5th)	(Russia) Saint Petersburg HC (3rd)	(Slovakia) HC Sporta Hlohovec (2nd)	
(Slovenia) RD Koper 2013 (4th)	(Portugal) S.L. Benfica (2nd)	(Czech Republic) Talent M.A.T. Plzeň (1st)	
First qualifying round
(Hungary) Csurgói KK (5th)	(Portugal) FC Porto (3rd)	(Greece) AC Filippos Veria (1st)	(Estonia) Põlva Serviti (1st)
(France) Chambéry Savoie Handball (5th)	(Switzerland) Pfadi Winterthur (3rd)	(Greece) AC Diomidis Argous (2nd)	(Iceland) Haukar Handball (1st)
(France) US Créteil Handball (6th)	(Ukraine) ZTR Zaporizhia (2nd)	(Israel) Maccabi Rishon LeZion (2nd)	(Montenegro) RK Budvanska Rivijera (1st)
(North Macedonia) RK Prilep 2010 (4th)	(Norway) Bodø HK (CW)	(Austria) Alpla HC Hard (3rd)	(Moldova) HC Olimpus-85 USEFS (1st)
(Romania) SCM Politehnica Timișoara (3rd)	(Serbia) RK Vojvodina (1st)	(Czech Republic) HC Dukla Prague (2nd)	(United Kingdom) London GD HC (1st)
(Croatia) GRK Varaždin 1930 (3rd)	(Serbia) RK Metaloplastika (2nd)	(Kosovo) KH BESA Famiglia (1st)	(Georgia (country)) B.S.B. Batumi (1st)
(Croatia) RK Zamet (4th)	(Turkey) BB Ankaraspor (2nd)	(Netherlands) OCI-Lions (1st)	
(Russia) Dinamo Astrakhan (4th)	(Luxembourg) Handball Käerjeng (2nd)	(Netherlands) KRAS/Volendam (2nd)	

Notes

1. France (FRA):
  - Saint-Raphaël, the runners-up of the 2015–16 LNH Division 1, earned the right to participate in the EHF Cup third qualifying round. They applied for participation in EHF Champions League group stage, but their request was rejected by the EHF.
  - Nantes and Montpellier, respectively the third- and fourth-placed teams of the 2015–16 LNH Division 1, earned the right to participate in the EHF Cup, but were granted berths in the EHF Champions League group stage. As a result, the fifth-placed team Chambéry and the sixth-placed team Créteil were awarded wildcard entries to the EHF Cup first qualifying round.
2. Germany (GER): Kiel, the third-placed team of the 2015–16 Handball-Bundesliga, would have participated in the EHF Cup third qualifying round, but was granted a berth into the EHF Champions League group stage. As a result, the fourth-placed team Melsungen was promoted to the third qualifying round, and the fifth-placed team Füchse Berlin was given a berth in the second qualifying round.
3. Spain (ESP): Barcelona, the winners of the 2015–16 Copa del Rey de Balonmano, earned the right to participate in the EHF Cup third qualifying round. However, since they also qualified for the EHF Champions League group stage as the winners of the 2015–16 Liga ASOBAL, their EHF Cup berth was given to the cup runners-up Helvetia Anaitasuna.

== Round and draw dates ==
The schedule of the competition was follows (all draws were held at the EHF headquarters in Vienna, Austria):

Phase	Round	Draw date	First leg	Second leg
Qualification	First qualifying round	19 July 2016	3–4 September 2016	10–11 September 2016
Qualification	Second qualifying round	19 July 2016	8–9 October 2016	15–16 October 2016
Qualification	Third qualifying round	18 October 2016	19–20 November 2016	26–27 November 2016
Group stage	Matchday 1	1 December 2016	11–12 February 2017	
Group stage	Matchday 2	1 December 2016	17–19 February 2017	
Group stage	Matchday 3	1 December 2016	4–5 March 2017	
Group stage	Matchday 4	1 December 2016	11–12 March 2017	
Group stage	Matchday 5	1 December 2016	25–26 March 2017	
Group stage	Matchday 6	1 December 2016	1–2 April 2017	
Knockout phase	Quarter-finals	4 April 2017	22–23 April 2017	29–30 April 2017
Knockout phase	Final four	2 May 2017	20–21 May 2017	

== Qualification stage ==
The qualification stage consists of three rounds, which are played as two-legged ties using a home-and-away system. In the draws for each round, teams are allocated into two pots, with teams from Pot 1 facing teams from Pot 2. The winners of each pairing (highlighted in bold) qualify for the following round.

For each round, teams listed first played the first leg at home. In some cases, teams agreed to play both matches at the same venue.

=== Round 1 ===
A total of 30 teams entered the draw for the first qualification round, which was held on Tuesday, 19 July 2016. The draw seeding pots were composed as follows:

Pot 1	Pot 2
(France) Chambéry Savoie Handball; (Hungary) Csurgói KK; (France) US Créteil Handball; (Portugal) FC Porto; (Romania) SCM Politehnica Timișoara; (Croatia) GRK Varaždin 1930; (Russia) Dinamo Astrakhan; (North Macedonia) RK Prilep 2010; (Czech Republic) HC Dukla Prague; (Iceland) Haukar Handball; (Ukraine) ZTR Zaporizhia; (Serbia) RK Vojvodina; (Greece) AC Filippos Veria; (Israel) Maccabi Rishon LeZion; (Netherlands) OCI-Lions	(Kosovo) KH BESA Famiglia; (Estonia) Põlva Serviti; (Turkey) BB Ankaraspor; (Luxembourg) Handball Käerjeng; (Moldova) HC Olimpus-85 USEFS; (Montenegro) RK Budvanska Rivijera; (United Kingdom) London GD HC; (Georgia (country)) B.S.B. Batumi; (Serbia) RK Vojvodina; (Greece) AC Diomidis Argous; (Switzerland) Pfadi Winterthur; (Croatia) RK Zamet; (Norway) Bodø HK; (Austria) Alpla HC Hard; (Netherlands) KRAS/Volendam

The first legs were played on 2–3 September and the second legs were played on 4 and 10–11 September 2015.

Team 1	Agg.	Team 2	1st leg	2nd leg
**Handball Käerjeng** (Luxembourg)	58–56^{1}	(Serbia) RK Vojvodina	30–31	28–25
US Créteil Handball (France)	56–56 (a)	(Croatia) **RK Zamet**	29–32	27–24
**Alpla HC Hard** (Austria)	55–43	(Netherlands) OCI-Lions	28–17	27–26
**Maccabi Rishon LeZion** (Israel)	79–36^{2}	(United Kingdom) London GD HC	38–14	41–22
**Chambéry Savoie Handball** (France)	67–39	(Netherlands) KRAS/Volendam	31–23	36–16
GRK Varaždin 1930 (Croatia)	51–58^{3}	(Turkey) **BB Ankaraspor**	24–32	27–26
**Haukar Handball** (Iceland)	61–46^{4}	(Greece) AC Diomidis Argous	33–26	28–20
KH BESA Famiglia (Kosovo)	58–62	(Czech Republic) **HC Dukla Prague**	35–31	23–31
B.S.B. Batumi (Georgia (country))	32–93^{5}	(Portugal) **FC Porto**	16–49	16–44
**Csurgói KK** (Hungary)	47–44	(Norway) Bodø HK	28–21	19–23
**SCM Politehnica Timișoara** (Romania)	51–43	(Estonia) Põlva Serviti	26–22	25–21
HC Olimpus-85 USEFS (Moldova)	49–77	(Ukraine) **ZTR Zaporizhia**	28–37	21–40
RK Prilep 2010 (North Macedonia)	34–84^{6}	(Switzerland) **Pfadi Winterthur**	19–42	15–42
RK Metaloplastika (Serbia)	44–47	(Russia) **Dinamo Astrakhan**	24–30	20–17
**AC Filippos Veria** (Greece)	58–50	(Montenegro) RK Budvanska Rivijera	30–24	28–26

Notes

^{1} Both legs were hosted by Handball Käerjeng.
^{2} Both legs were hosted by Maccabi Rishon LeZion.
^{3} Both legs were hosted by BB Ankaraspor.
^{4} Both legs were hosted by AC Diomidis Argous.
^{5} Both legs were hosted by FC Porto.
^{6} Both legs were hosted by RK Prilep 2010.

=== Round 2 ===
A total of 32 teams entered the draw for the second qualifying round, which was held after the draw for the first qualifying round on Tuesday, 19 July 2016. The draw seeding pots were composed as follows:

Pot 1	Pot 2
(Luxembourg) Red Boys Differdange; (Belgium) HC Achilles Bocholt; (Sweden) Alingsås HK; (Slovenia) RD Koper 2013; (Switzerland) Wacker Thun; (Hungary) Balatonfüredi KSE; (Portugal) S.L. Benfica; (Romania) CSM București; (Belarus) SKA Minsk; (Croatia) RK Nexe Našice; (Russia) Saint Petersburg HC; (Norway) ØIF Arendal; (Slovakia) HC Sporta Hlohovec; (Czech Republic) Talent M.A.T. Plzeň; (Poland) NMC Górnik Zabrze; (Germany) Füchse Berlin	(Denmark) KIF Kolding København; (France) Chambéry Savoie Handball; (Hungary) Csurgói KK; (Portugal) FC Porto; (Romania) SCM Politehnica Timișoara; (Russia) Dinamo Astrakhan; (Czech Republic) HC Dukla Prague; (Iceland) Haukar Handball; (Ukraine) ZTR Zaporizhia; (Greece) AC Filippos Veria; (Israel) Maccabi Rishon LeZion; (Turkey) BB Ankaraspor; (Luxembourg) Handball Käerjeng; (Switzerland) Pfadi Winterthur; (Croatia) RK Zamet; (Austria) Alpla HC Hard

The first legs were played on 8–9 October and the second legs were played on 9 and 15–16 October 2016.

Team 1	Agg.	Team 2	1st leg	2nd leg
**KIF Kolding København** (Denmark)	69–43	(Czech Republic) Talent M.A.T. Plzeň	38–23	31–20
**Maccabi Rishon LeZion** (Israel)	56–49^{1}	(Luxembourg) Red Boys Differdange	26–25	30–24
**Csurgói KK** (Hungary)	58–46^{1}	(Belgium) HC Achilles Bocholt	34–23	24–23
**S.L. Benfica** (Portugal)	64–56	(Luxembourg) Handball Käerjeng	31–26	33–30
Chambéry Savoie Handball (France)	44–49	(Germany) **Füchse Berlin**	22–25	22–24
Balatonfüredi KSE (Hungary)	48–50	(Switzerland) **Pfadi Winterthur**	28–23	20–27
**Saint Petersburg HC** (Russia)	57–46	(Turkey) BB Ankaraspor	26–19	31–27
ØIF Arendal (Norway)	49–51	(Romania) **SCM Politehnica Timișoara**	23–24	26–27
Haukar Handball (Iceland)	51–55	(Sweden) **Alingsås HK**	24–24	27–31
**ZTR Zaporizhia** (Ukraine)	45–44^{2}	(Switzerland) Wacker Thun	23–22	22–22
**NMC Górnik Zabrze** (Poland)	50–32^{3}	(Greece) AC Filippos Veria	30–17	20–15
**FC Porto** (Portugal)	57–46	(Slovenia) RD Koper 2013	31–24	26–22
Alpla HC Hard (Austria)	53–56	(Belarus) **SKA Minsk**	28–25	25–31
**Dinamo Astrakhan** (Russia)	60–49	(Slovakia) HC Sporta Hlohovec	33–29	27–20
CSM București (Romania)	50–50 (a)	(Croatia) **RK Zamet**	29–23	21–27
HC Dukla Prague (Czech Republic)	53–59	(Croatia) **RK Nexe Našice**	30–29	23–30

Notes

^{1} Order of legs reversed
^{2} Both legs were hosted by ZTR Zaporizhia.
^{3} Both legs were hosted by Górnik Zabrze.

=== Round 3 ===
A total of 32 teams entered the draw for the third qualifying round, which was held on Tuesday, 18 October 2016. The draw seeding pots were composed as follows:

Pot 1	Pot 2
(Germany) Frisch Auf Göppingen; (Spain) CB Ademar León; (France) Saint-Raphaël Var Handball; (Germany) MT Melsungen; (Spain) Helvetia Anaitasuna; (Denmark) HC Midtjylland; (Slovenia) RD Ribnica; (Hungary) Grundfos Tatabánya KC; (Poland) KS Azoty-Puławy; (Germany) SC Magdeburg; (Spain) Fraikin Granollers; (Denmark) GOG; (Slovenia) RK Gorenje Velenje; (Israel) Maccabi Tel Aviv; (Finland) Riihimäki Cocks; (Austria) Bregenz Handball	(Sweden) Alingsås HK; (Portugal) S.L. Benfica; (Belarus) SKA Minsk; (Croatia) RK Nexe Našice; (Russia) Saint Petersburg HC; (Poland) NMC Górnik Zabrze; (Germany) Füchse Berlin; (Denmark) KIF Kolding København; (Hungary) Csurgói KK; (Portugal) FC Porto; (Romania) SCM Politehnica Timișoara; (Russia) Dinamo Astrakhan; (Ukraine) ZTR Zaporizhia; (Israel) Maccabi Rishon LeZion; (Switzerland) Pfadi Winterthur; (Croatia) RK Zamet

The first legs were played on 18–20 and 23 November and the second legs were played on 25–27 November 2016.

Team 1	Agg.	Team 2	1st leg	2nd leg
RK Zamet (Croatia)	43–66	(Germany) **MT Melsungen**	23–34	20–32
SKA Minsk (Belarus)	55–61	(France) **Saint-Raphaël Var Handball**	30–28	25–33
KS Azoty-Puławy (Poland)	52–53	(Portugal) **S.L. Benfica**	34–29	18–24
Dinamo Astrakhan (Russia)	55–64	(Denmark) **HC Midtjylland**	29–29	26–35
RK Gorenje Velenje (Slovenia)	56–58	(Germany) **Füchse Berlin**	24–29	32–29
**Fraikin Granollers** (Spain)	57–57 (a)	(Ukraine) ZTR Zaporizhia	27–29	30–28
Saint Petersburg HC (Russia)	48–51	(Israel) **Maccabi Tel Aviv**	25–23	23–28
**SC Magdeburg** (Germany)	61–49	(Croatia) RK Nexe Našice	31–22	30–27
**Helvetia Anaitasuna** (Spain)	53–51	(Hungary) Csurgói KK	27–21	26–30
Alingsås HK (Sweden)	56–58	(Denmark) **GOG**	29–26	27–32
SCM Politehnica Timișoara (Romania)	46–52	(Slovenia) **RD Ribnica**	27–22	19–30
**Riihimäki Cocks** (Finland)	59–49	(Poland) NMC Górnik Zabrze	30–19	29–30
**Frisch Auf Göppingen** (Germany)	70–62^{1}	(Switzerland) Pfadi Winterthur	33–30	37–32
CB Ademar León (Spain)	51–52	(Denmark) **KIF Kolding København**	24–27	27–25
Bregenz Handball (Austria)	56–59	(Portugal) **FC Porto**	27–28	29–31
**Grundfos Tatabánya KC** (Hungary)	63–49	(Israel) Maccabi Rishon LeZion	35–23	28–26

Notes

^{1} Order of legs reversed

== Group stage ==
Location of teams of the 2016–17 EHF Cup group stage.
Red: Group A; Blue: Group B; Green: Group C; Yellow: Group D.

=== Draw and format ===
The draw of the EHF Cup group stage took place on Thursday, 1 December 2016. The 16 teams allocated into four pots were drawn into four groups of four teams. The country protection rule was applied, i.e. two clubs from the same country could not face each other in the same group.

In each group, teams play against each other home-and-away in a round-robin format. The matchdays are 11–12 February, 17–19 February, 4–5 March, 11–12 March, 25–26 March, and 1–2 April 2017.

If two or more teams are equal on points on completion of the group matches, the following criteria are applied to determine the rankings (in descending order):

1. number of points in matches of all teams directly involved;
2. goal difference in matches of all teams directly involved;
3. higher number of plus goals in matches of all teams directly involved;
4. goal difference in all matches of the group;
5. higher number of plus goals in all matches of the group;

If no ranking can be determined, a decision shall be obtained by drawing lots. Lots shall be drawn by the EHF, if possible in the presence of a responsible of each club.

=== Seeding ===
On 28 November 2016, EHF announced the composition of the group stage seeding pots.

Pot 1	Pot 2	Pot 3	Pot 4
(Denmark) KIF Kolding København (France) Saint-Raphaël Var Handball (Germany) Frisch Auf Göppingen (Germany) MT Melsungen	(Denmark) HC Midtjylland (Spain) Helvetia Anaitasuna (Hungary) Grundfos Tatabánya KC (Slovenia) RD Ribnica	(Denmark) GOG (Spain) Fraikin Granollers (Germany) SC Magdeburg (Portugal) S.L. Benfica	(Finland) Riihimäki Cocks (Germany) Füchse Berlin (Israel) Maccabi Tel Aviv (Portugal) FC Porto

=== Group A ===
Team	Pld	W	D	L	GF	GA	GD	Pts	FCH	SVH	GOG	RDR
(Germany) Füchse Berlin	6	5	0	1	185	163	+22	10	—	33–31	37–29	38–30
(France) Saint-Raphaël Var Handball	6	4	0	2	179	164	+15	8	27–21	—	32–36	26–22
(Denmark) GOG	6	3	0	3	187	190	−3	6	26–31	28–32	—	32–27
(Slovenia) RD Ribnica	6	0	0	6	154	188	−34	0	20–25	24–31	31–36	—

=== Group B ===
Team	Pld	W	D	L	GF	GA	GD	Pts	GÖP	FGR	POR	MYD
(Germany) Frisch Auf Göppingen	6	6	0	0	181	155	+26	12	—	29–28	30–28	31–23
(Spain) Fraikin Granollers	6	3	0	3	171	165	+6	6	27–35	—	33–22	34–32
(Portugal) FC Porto	6	2	0	4	159	170	−11	4	27–31	23–22	—	33–25
(Denmark) HC Midtjylland	6	1	0	5	155	176	−21	2	22–25	24–27	29–26	—

=== Group C ===
Team	Pld	W	D	L	GF	GA	GD	Pts	MAG	TAT	KOL	MTA
(Germany) SC Magdeburg	6	5	1	0	200	146	+54	11	—	30–25	36–24	42–24
(Hungary) Grundfos Tatabánya KC	6	4	0	2	161	157	+4	8	28–31	—	28–26	27–24
(Denmark) KIF Kolding København	6	2	1	3	166	172	−6	5	23–23	26–29	—	36–31
(Israel) Maccabi Tel Aviv	6	0	0	6	146	198	−52	0	22–38	20–24	25–31	—

=== Group D ===
Team	Pld	W	D	L	GF	GA	GD	Pts	MEL	ANA	BEN	RCO
(Germany) MT Melsungen	6	4	0	2	168	140	+28	8	—	28–22	32–22	33–19
(Spain) Helvetia Anaitasuna	6	4	0	2	171	163	+8	8	23–22	—	35–28	30–24
(Portugal) S.L. Benfica	6	4	0	2	158	165	−7	8	26–24	33–28	—	26–25
(Finland) Riihimäki Cocks	6	0	0	6	145	174	−29	0	28–29	28–33	21–23	—

=== Ranking of the second-placed teams ===
Because the German side Frisch Auf Göppingen, the organizers of the Final 4 tournament, finished on top of their group they qualified directly to the final tournament and only the top three second-placed teams qualified to the quarter-finals. The ranking of the second-placed teams was determined on the basis of the team's results in the group stage.

Grp	Team	Pld	W	D	L	GF	GA	GD	Pts
A	(France) Saint-Raphaël Var Handball	6	4	0	2	179	164	+15	8
D	(Spain) Helvetia Anaitasuna	6	4	0	2	171	163	+8	8
C	(Hungary) Grundfos Tatabánya KC	6	4	0	2	161	154	+7	8
B	(Spain) Fraikin Granollers	6	3	0	3	171	165	+6	6

== Knockout stage ==
=== Quarter-finals ===
Pot 1
(Germany) SC Magdeburg
(Germany) Füchse Berlin
(Germany) MT Melsungen

Pot 2
(France) Saint-Raphaël Var Handball
(Spain) Helvetia Anaitasuna
(Hungary) Grundfos Tatabánya KC

Team 1	Agg.	Team 2	1st leg	2nd leg
Helvetia Anaitasuna (Spain)	59–69	(Germany) SC Magdeburg	27–34	32–35
Grundfos Tatabánya KC (Hungary)	47–58	(Germany) Füchse Berlin	25–30	22–28
Saint-Raphaël Var Handball (France)	61–49	(Germany) MT Melsungen	30–26	31–23

=== Final four ===
Semi-finals
20 May
(Germany) SC Magdeburg	29
(Germany) Frisch Auf Göppingen	33
20 May
(France) Saint-Raphaël Var Handball	24
(Germany) Füchse Berlin	35

Final
21 May
(Germany) Frisch Auf Göppingen	30
(Germany) Füchse Berlin	22
Third place
21 May
(Germany) SC Magdeburg	32
(France) Saint-Raphaël Var Handball	31

== See also ==
- 2016–17 EHF Champions League
- 2016–17 EHF Challenge Cup
- 2016–17 Women's EHF Cup
