= 2016–17 EHF Champions League =

European handball tournament

EHF Champions League
- 2016–17

Tournament information
- Sport: Handball
- Location: Lanxess Arena (FINAL4)
- Dates: 3 September 2016–4 June 2017
- Teams: 28 (group stage); 34 (Qualification)
- Website: ehfcl.com

Final positions
- Champions: (North Macedonia) Vardar
- Runner-up: (France) Paris Saint-Germain

Tournament statistics
- Matches played: 200
- Goals scored: 11085 (55.43 per match)
- Attendance: 845,087 (4,225 per match)
- Top scorer(s): (Germany) Uwe Gensheimer (115 goals)

The 2016–17 EHF Champions League was the 57th edition of Europe's premier club handball tournament and the 24th edition under the current EHF Champions League format. Vardar were crowned champions for the first time, defeating Paris Saint-Germain Handball.

== Competition format ==
Twenty-eight teams participated in the competition, divided in four groups. Groups A and B were played with eight teams each, in a round robin, home and away format. The top team in each group qualified directly for the quarter-finals, the bottom two in each group dropped out of the competition and the remaining 10 teams qualified for the first knock-out phase.

In groups C and D, six teams played in each group in a round robin format, playing both home and away. The top two teams in each group then met in a ‘semi-final’ play-off, with the two winners going through to the first knock-out phase. The remaining teams dropped out of the competition.

Knock-out Phase 1 (Last 16)

12 teams played home and away in the first knock-out phase, with the 10 teams qualified from groups A and B and the two teams qualified from groups C and D.

Knock-out Phase 2 (Quarterfinals)

The six winners of the matches in the first knock-out phase joined with the winners of groups A and B to play home and away for the right to play in the Velux EHF Final4.

Final four

The culmination of the season, the Velux EHF Final4, continued in its existing format, with the four top teams from the competition competing for the title.

== Team allocation ==
26 teams were directly qualified for the group stage.

Groups A/B
| (Belarus) Meshkov Brest (1st) | (Croatia) Zagreb (1st) | (Denmark) Bjerringbro-Silkeborg (1st) | (France) Paris Saint-Germain (1st) |
| (Germany) Flensburg-Handewitt (2nd) | (Germany) THW Kiel (3rd) | (Germany) Rhein-Neckar Löwen (1st) | (Hungary) MOL-Pick Szeged (2nd) |
| (Hungary) Telekom Veszprém (1st) | (North Macedonia) Vardar (1st) | (Poland) Vive Tauron Kielce^{TH} (1st) | (Poland) Wisła Płock (2nd) |
| (Slovenia) Celje (1st) | (Spain) FC Barcelona Lassa (1st) | (Sweden) IFK Kristianstad (1st) | (Switzerland) Kadetten Schaffhausen (1st) |
Groups C/D
| (Denmark) Team Tvis Holstebro (2nd) | (France) Montpellier (4th) | (France) HBC Nantes (3rd) | (North Macedonia) Metalurg Skopje (2nd) |
| (Norway) Elverum Håndball (1st) | (Romania) Dinamo București (1st) | (Russia) Chekhovskiye Medvedi (1st) | (Spain) Logroño (2nd) |
| (Turkey) Beşiktaş (1st) | (Ukraine) Motor Zaporizhzhia (1st) | Qualifier Group 1 | Qualifier Group 2 |
Qualification tournaments
| (Austria) Bregenz Handball | (Belgium) Achilles Bocholt | (Finland) Riihimäki Cocks | (Israel) Maccabi Tel Aviv |
| (Luxembourg) Red Boys Differdange | (Portugal) ABC/UMinho (1st) | (Slovakia) Tatran Prešov | (Slovenia) RK Gorenje |

- ^{TH = Title holders}

== Round and draw dates ==
The qualification and group stage draw was held in Glostrup, Denmark.

| Phase | Draw date |
|---|---|
| Qualification tournaments | 29 June 2016 |
| Group stage | 1 July 2016 |
| Knockout stage | 1 July 2016 |
| Final Four (Cologne) | 2 May 2017 |

== Qualification stage ==
The draw was held on 29 June 2016 at 13:00 in Vienna, Austria. The eight teams were split in two groups and played a semifinal and final to determine the last participants. Matches were played on 3 and 4 September 2016.

=== Qualification tournament 1 ===
Semifinals
3 September
(Slovenia) RK Gorenje | 28
(Finland) Riihimäki Cocks | 25
3 September
(Slovakia) Tatran Prešov | 38
(Luxembourg) Red Boys Differdange | 32

Final
4 September
(Slovenia) RK Gorenje | 21
(Slovakia) Tatran Prešov | 23
Third place
4 September
(Finland) Riihimäki Cocks | 30
(Luxembourg) Red Boys Differdange | 21

=== Qualification tournament 2 ===
Semifinals
3 September
(Portugal) ABC/UMinho | 34
(Israel) Maccabi Tel Aviv | 27
3 September
(Austria) Bregenz Handball | 39
(Belgium) Achilles Bocholt | 31

Final
4 September
(Portugal) ABC/UMinho | 33
(Austria) Bregenz Handball | 32
Third place
4 September
(Israel) Maccabi Tel Aviv | 33
(Belgium) Achilles Bocholt | 30

== Group stage ==
Location of teams of the 2016–17 EHF Champions League group stage.
Red: Group A; Blue: Group B; Green: Group C; Yellow: Group D.

The draw for the group stage was held on 1 July 2016 at 13:00 in the Vienna city centre. The 28 teams were drawn into four groups, two containing eight teams (Groups A and B) and two containing six teams (Groups C and D). The only restriction is that teams from the same national association could not face each other in the same group. Since Germany qualified three teams, the lowest seeded side (Kiel) was drawn with one of the other two.

In each group, teams played against each other in a double round-robin format, with home and away matches.

After completion of the group stage matches, the knockout stage was determined in the following manner:

- Groups A and B – the top team qualified directly for the quarterfinals, and the five teams ranked 2nd–6th advanced to the first knockout round.
- Groups C and D – the top two teams from both groups contested a playoff to determine the last two sides joining the 10 teams from Groups A and B in the first knockout round.

Tiebreakers
In the group stage, teams were ranked according to points (2 points for a win, 1 point for a draw, 0 points for a loss). After completion of the group stage, if two or more teams scored the same number of points, the ranking was determined as follows (article 4.3.1, section II of regulations):
1. Highest number of points in matches between the teams directly involved
2. Superior goal difference in matches between the teams directly involved
3. Highest number of goals scored in matches between the teams directly involved (or in the away match in case of a two-team tie)
4. Superior goal difference in all matches of the group
5. Highest number of plus goals in all matches of the group

If the ranking of one of these teams was determined, the above criteria were consecutively followed until the ranking of all teams was determined. If no ranking was determined, a decision was to be obtained by EHF through drawing of lots.

During the group stage, only criteria 4–5 applied to determine the provisional ranking of teams.

=== Group A ===
| Pos | Team | Pld | W | D | L | GF | GA | GD | Pts | Qualification | BAR | PAR | VES | FLE | KIE | BJE | PLO | SCH |
|---|---|---|---|---|---|---|---|---|---|---|---|---|---|---|---|---|---|---|
| 1 | (Spain) Barcelona Lassa | 14 | 12 | 1 | 1 | 413 | 354 | +59 | 25 | Quarterfinals | — | 35–32 | 26–23 | 26–23 | 26–25 | 34–19 | 36–28 | 38–25 |
| 2 | (France) Paris Saint-Germain | 14 | 12 | 0 | 2 | 451 | 383 | +68 | 24 | First knockout round | 33–26 | — | 28–24 | 27–22 | 42–24 | 32–27 | 33–30 | 34–26 |
| 3 | (Hungary) Telekom Veszprém | 14 | 8 | 2 | 4 | 381 | 365 | +16 | 18 | First knockout round | 22–25 | 28–29 | — | 34–28 | 21–19 | 30–29 | 31–25 | 32–28 |
| 4 | (Germany) Flensburg-Handewitt | 14 | 7 | 1 | 6 | 382 | 366 | +16 | 15 | First knockout round | 27–28 | 33–34 | 24–24 | — | 25–26 | 26–24 | 22–20 | 31–26 |
| 5 | (Germany) THW Kiel | 14 | 5 | 2 | 7 | 353 | 376 | −23 | 12 | First knockout round | 27–27 | 28–27 | 25–27 | 22–30 | — | 21–24 | 24–24 | 32–29 |
| 6 | (Denmark) Bjerringbro-Silkeborg | 14 | 4 | 0 | 10 | 364 | 396 | −32 | 8 (Note: Bjerringbro-Silkeborg 58–52 Wisła Płock) | First knockout round | 23–27 | 30–36 | 24–29 | 19–25 | 25–28 | — | 33–24 | 37–32 |
| 7 | (Poland) Wisła Płock | 14 | 3 | 2 | 9 | 367 | 401 | −34 | 8 | | 23–28 | 25–29 | 28–28 | 30–37 | 24–22 | 28–25 | — | 33–26 |
| 8 | (Switzerland) Kadetten Schaffhausen | 14 | 1 | 0 | 13 | 370 | 440 | −70 | 2 | | 24–31 | 25–35 | 27–28 | 26–29 | 25–30 | 24–25 | 27–25 | — |

Source: EHF
Rules for classification: See Tiebreakers

=== Group B ===
| Pos | Team | Pld | W | D | L | GF | GA | GD | Pts | Qualification | VAR | KIE | SZE | RNL | BRE | ZAG | CEL | KRI |
|---|---|---|---|---|---|---|---|---|---|---|---|---|---|---|---|---|---|---|
| 1 | (North Macedonia) Vardar | 14 | 10 | 0 | 4 | 412 | 378 | +34 | 20 | Quarterfinals | — | 40–34 | 30–27 | 26–29 | 31–27 | 25–20 | 35–30 | 32–29 |
| 2 | (Poland) Vive Tauron Kielce | 14 | 9 | 0 | 5 | 415 | 390 | +25 | 18 | First knockout round | 27–24 | — | 28–24 | 26–34 | 35–27 | 29–25 | 31–23 | 38–28 |
| 3 | (Hungary) MOL-Pick Szeged | 14 | 8 | 1 | 5 | 376 | 350 | +26 | 17 (Note: MOL-Pick Szeged 58–52 Rhein-Neckar Löwen) | First knockout round | 21–23 | 27–29 | — | 28–28 | 24–22 | 26–21 | 27–22 | 33–28 |
| 4 | (Germany) Rhein-Neckar Löwen | 14 | 8 | 1 | 5 | 392 | 396 | −4 | 17 | First knockout round | 27–33 | 28–25 | 24–30 | — | 25–24 | 25–24 | 31–30 | 30–29 |
| 5 | (Belarus) Meshkov Brest | 14 | 5 | 4 | 5 | 383 | 385 | −2 | 14 | First knockout round | 30–26 | 24–29 | 25–23 | 30–28 | — | 21–21 | 29–29 | 32–27 |
| 6 | (Croatia) Zagreb | 14 | 4 | 1 | 9 | 332 | 356 | −24 | 9 (Note: Zagreb 51–51 Celje, Zagreb advanced on away goals.) | First knockout round | 28–27 | 23–26 | 24–26 | 25–21 | 22–27 | — | 23–21 | 26–23 |
| 7 | (Slovenia) Celje | 14 | 3 | 3 | 8 | 399 | 424 | −25 | 9 | | 26–32 | 34–33 | 25–31 | 37–31 | 36–36 | 30–28 | — | 27–28 |
| 8 | (Sweden) IFK Kristianstad | 14 | 3 | 2 | 9 | 381 | 411 | −30 | 8 | | 23–28 | 29–25 | 21–29 | 29–31 | 29–29 | 29–22 | 29–29 | — |

Source: EHF
Rules for classification: See Tiebreakers

=== Group C ===
| Pos | Team | Pld | W | D | L | GF | GA | GD | Pts | Qualification | MON | LOG | MET | PRE | ELV | MED |
|---|---|---|---|---|---|---|---|---|---|---|---|---|---|---|---|---|
| 1 | (France) Montpellier | 10 | 8 | 0 | 2 | 302 | 252 | +50 | 16 | Playoffs | — | 37–27 | 28–18 | 28–23 | 31–24 | 26–22 |
| 2 | (Spain) Logroño | 10 | 5 | 1 | 4 | 294 | 286 | +8 | 11 | Playoffs | 31–30 | — | 31–25 | 33–27 | 28–21 | 34–37 |
| 3 | (North Macedonia) Metalurg Skopje | 10 | 5 | 0 | 5 | 240 | 251 | −11 | 10 | | 24–30 | 24–23 | — | 26–20 | 18–17 | 31–24 |
| 4 | (Slovakia) Tatran Prešov | 10 | 4 | 1 | 5 | 259 | 271 | −12 | 9 | | 24–28 | 30–27 | 27–22 | — | 25–27 | 30–28 |
| 5 | (Norway) Elverum Håndball | 10 | 3 | 2 | 5 | 257 | 274 | −17 | 8 | | 32–31 | 27–32 | 26–31 | 24–24 | — | 28–28 |
| 6 | (Russia) Chekhovskiye Medvedi | 10 | 2 | 2 | 6 | 273 | 291 | −18 | 6 | | 27–33 | 28–28 | 25–21 | 28–29 | 26–31 | — |

Source: EHF
Rules for classification: See Tiebreakers

=== Group D ===
| Pos | Team | Pld | W | D | L | GF | GA | GD | Pts | Qualification | NAN | ZAP | BES | BUC | HOL | BRA |
|---|---|---|---|---|---|---|---|---|---|---|---|---|---|---|---|---|
| 1 | (France) HBC Nantes | 10 | 8 | 1 | 1 | 312 | 270 | +42 | 17 | Playoffs | — | 32–34 | 33–19 | 26–24 | 31–26 | 35–33 |
| 2 | (Ukraine) Motor Zaporizhzhia | 10 | 7 | 1 | 2 | 308 | 272 | +36 | 15 | Playoffs | 26–26 | — | 34–28 | 35–27 | 34–28 | 27–23 |
| 3 | (Turkey) Beşiktaş | 10 | 5 | 1 | 4 | 275 | 289 | −14 | 11 | | 28–33 | 23–22 | — | 29–27 | 36–27 | 33–31 |
| 4 | (Romania) Dinamo București | 10 | 3 | 2 | 5 | 294 | 294 | 0 | 8 | | 26–27 | 35–31 | 26–26 | — | 30–25 | 35–29 |
| 5 | (Denmark) Team Tvis Holstebro | 10 | 2 | 1 | 7 | 281 | 314 | −33 | 5 | | 25–35 | 28–30 | 29–25 | 32–32 | — | 34–29 |
| 6 | (Portugal) ABC/UMinho | 10 | 2 | 0 | 8 | 289 | 320 | −31 | 4 | | 29–34 | 22–35 | 27–28 | 34–32 | 32–27 | — |

Source: EHF
Rules for classification: See Tiebreakers

=== Playoffs ===
The top two teams from Groups C and D contest a playoff to determine the two sides advancing to the knockout phase. The winners of each group will face the runners-up of the other group in a two-legged tie. The first leg will be played on 1–5 March 2017 and the second leg on 7–12 March 2017.

| Team 1 | Agg. | Team 2 | 1st leg | 2nd leg |
|---|---|---|---|---|
| Logroño (Spain) | 56–68 | (France) HBC Nantes | 25–31 | 31–37 |
| Motor Zaporizhzhia (Ukraine) | 63–65 | (France) Montpellier | 34–36 | 29–29 |

== Knockout stage ==
The first-placed team from the preliminary groups A and B advanced to the quarterfinals, while the 2–6th placed teams advanced to the round of 16 alongside the playoff winners.

=== Round of 16 ===
| Team 1 | Agg. | Team 2 | 1st leg | 2nd leg |
|---|---|---|---|---|
| HBC Nantes (France) | 53–61 | (France) Paris Saint-Germain | 26–26 | 27–35 |
| Montpellier (France) | 61–54 | (Poland) Vive Tauron Kielce | 33–28 | 28–26 |
| Zagreb (Croatia) | 41–52 | (Hungary) Telekom Veszprém | 22–23 | 19–29 |
| Bjerringbro-Silkeborg (Denmark) | 48–59 | (Hungary) MOL-Pick Szeged | 24–26 | 24–33 |
| Meshkov Brest (Belarus) | 51–54 | (Germany) Flensburg-Handewitt | 25–26 | 26–28 |
| THW Kiel (Germany) | 50–49 | (Germany) Rhein-Neckar Löwen | 24–25 | 26–24 |

=== Quarterfinals ===
| Team 1 | Agg. | Team 2 | 1st leg | 2nd leg |
|---|---|---|---|---|
| THW Kiel (Germany) | 46–49 | (Spain) Barcelona Lassa | 28–26 | 18–23 |
| Flensburg-Handewitt (Germany) | 51–61 | (North Macedonia) Vardar | 24–26 | 27–35 |
| MOL-Pick Szeged (Hungary) | 57–60 | (France) Paris Saint-Germain | 27–30 | 30–30 |
| Telekom Veszprém (Hungary) | 56–48 | (France) Montpellier | 26–23 | 30–25 |

=== Final four ===
Semifinals
3 June
(Hungary) Telekom Veszprém | 26
(France) Paris Saint-Germain | 27
3 June
(North Macedonia) Vardar | 26
(Spain) Barcelona Lassa | 25

Final
4 June
(France) Paris Saint-Germain | 23
(North Macedonia) Vardar | 24
Third place
4 June
(Hungary) Telekom Veszprém | 34
(Spain) Barcelona Lassa | 30

==== Final ====
| 4 June 2017; 18:00 | Paris Saint-Germain (France) | 23–24 | (North Macedonia) Vardar | Lanxess Arena, Cologne; Attendance: 19,750; Referees: Geipel, Helbig (GER) |
| 4 June 2017; 18:00 | Karabatić 5 | (12–11) | Dibirov 6 | Lanxess Arena, Cologne; Attendance: 19,750; Referees: Geipel, Helbig (GER) |
| 4 June 2017; 18:00 | 2× (yellow card) 4× (suspension) | Report | 2× (yellow card) 4× (suspension) | Lanxess Arena, Cologne; Attendance: 19,750; Referees: Geipel, Helbig (GER) |

== Statistics ==
=== Top goalscorers ===
Statistics exclude qualifying rounds.

| Rank | Player | Team | Goals |
|---|---|---|---|
| 1 | (Germany) Uwe Gensheimer | (France) Paris Saint-Germain | 115 |
| 2 | (Denmark) Mikkel Hansen | (France) Paris Saint-Germain | 99 |
| 3 | (Serbia) Momir Ilić | (Hungary) Telekom Veszprém | 89 |
| 4 | (Hungary) Zsolt Balogh | (Hungary) MOL-Pick Szeged | 88 |
| 4 | (Slovenia) Jure Dolenec | (France) Montpellier | 88 |
| 6 | (North Macedonia) Kiril Lazarov | (Spain) Barcelona Lassa | 85 |
| 7 | (Hungary) Gábor Császár | (Switzerland) Kadetten Schaffhausen | 84 |
| 8 | (Spain) Alex Dujshebaev | (North Macedonia) Vardar | 83 |
| 9 | (France) Nedim Remili | (France) Paris Saint-Germain | 81 |
| 9 | (Serbia) Rastko Stojković | (Belarus) Meshkov Brest | 81 |

== Awards ==
The All-star team of the Champions League 2016/17:

| Position | Player |
|---|---|
| Goalkeeper | (Spain) Gonzalo Pérez de Vargas (Barcelona Lassa) |
| Right wing | (Spain) Víctor Tomás (Barcelona Lassa) |
| Right back | (Spain) Alex Dujshebaev (RK Vardar) |
| Centre back | (France) Nikola Karabatić (Paris Saint-Germain) |
| Left back | (Denmark) Mikkel Hansen (Paris Saint-Germain) |
| Left wing | (Germany) Uwe Gensheimer (Paris Saint-Germain) |
| Pivot | (France) Ludovic Fabregas (Montpellier Handball) |
| Final four MVP | (Serbia and Montenegro) (Spain) Arpad Sterbik (RK Vardar) |
| Best defender | (France) Luka Karabatić (Paris Saint-Germain) |
| Best young player | (France) Nedim Remili (Paris Saint-Germain) |
| Best coach | (Spain) Raúl González (RK Vardar) |

Best Coach: (Spain) Raúl González

== See also ==
- 2016–17 EHF Cup
- 2016–17 EHF Challenge Cup
- 2016–17 Women's EHF Champions League
