= 2014–15 LNH Division 1 =

LNH Division 1
- Season: 2014–15
- Champions: Paris Saint-Germain Handball
- Matches played: 182
- Goals scored: 10,200 (56.04 per match)
- Top goalscorer: (Denmark) Mikkel Hansen (201 goals)
- Biggest home win: PSG 41–20 Istres (11 February 2015)
- Biggest away win: Aix 29–43 PSG (12 December 2014)
- Highest scoring: Saint-Raphaël 41–32 Aix (18 August 2013)

The 2014–15 LNH Division 1 is the 63rd season of the LNH Division 1, France's premier Handball league.

== Team information ==
Locations of the 2014-15 LNH Division 1

The following 14 clubs compete in the LNH Division 1 during the 2014–15 season:

Team	Location	Arena	Capacity
Aix	Aix-en-Provence	Complexe sportif du Val de l'Arc	1,650
Cesson-Rennes	Rennes	Palais des sports de la Valette; Le Liberté	1,400; 4,000
Chambéry	Chambéry	Le Phare	4,400
US Créteil	Créteil	Palais des Sports Robert Oubron	2,500
Dunkerque	Dunkerque	Stade des Flandres	2,400
Istres	Istres	Halle Polyvalente	2,000
Montpellier	Montpellier	Palais des sports René-Bougnol; Park&Suites Arena	3,000; 8,000
Nantes	Nantes	Palais des Sports; Halle XXL de la Beaujoire	5,000; 9,000
USAM Nîmes	Nîmes	Le Parnasse	3,391
Paris Saint-Germain	Paris	Stade Pierre de Coubertin; Halle Georges Carpentier	3,402; 4,300
Saint Raphaël	Saint-Raphaël	Palais des sports J-F Krakowski	2,000
Sélestat	Sélestat	CSI Sélestat; Rhénus Sport	2,300; 5,500
Fenix Toulouse	Toulouse	Palais des Sports André Brouat	4,200
Tremblay	Tremblay-en-France	Palais des sports	1,100

=== Personnel and kits ===
Following is the list of clubs competing in 2014–15 LNH Division 1, with their president, head coach, kit manufacturer and shirt sponsor.

Team	President	Head coach	Kit manufacturer	Shirt sponsor
Aix	Christian Salomez	(Croatia) Zvonimir Serdarušić	Kempa	GTM Sud, Saigi
Cesson-Rennes	Stéphane Clémenceau	(France) Yérime Sylla	Kempa	—
Chambéry	Alain Poncet	(France) ~~Mario Cavalli~~ (France) ~~Jackson Richardson~~ (interim) (Croatia) Ivica Obrvan	hummel	Excoffier, EDF
US Créteil	Jean-Luc Druais	(France) ~~Benjamin Pavoni~~ (France) Christophe Mazel	Kappa	Suez Sita
Dunkerque	Jean Pierre Vandaele	(France) Patrick Cazal	hummel	Dillinger
Istres	Louis Morales	(France) Gilles Derot	Kempa	ville'd Istres
Montpellier	Rémy Lévy	(France) Patrice Canayer	ASICS	Montpellier Agglomération
Nantes	Gaël Pelletier	(France) Thierry Anti	hummel	SOGEA Atlantique
USAM Nîmes	David Tebib	(France) ~~Jérôme Chauvet~~ (France) Franck Maurice	Kappa	piscineprivee, Nîmes
Paris Saint-Germain	Nasser Al-Khelaifi	(France) Philippe Gardent	Nike	gfi
Saint Raphaël	Jean-François Krakowski	(France) Joël Da Silva	hummel	Pizzorno
Sélestat	Vincent Mompert	(France) ~~Jean-Luc Le Gall~~ (France) Christian Gaudin	hummel	Reproland, Galva-Hilo
Fenix Toulouse	Philippe Dallard	(Spain) Antonio García	hummel	E.Leclerc
Tremblay	Pascal Papillon	(France) David Christmann	hummel	Veolia

== League table ==
#	Team	Pld	W	D	L	GF	GA	Diff	Pts	Qualification or relegation
1	Paris Saint-Germain (C) (F)	26	22	1	3	842	661	181	45	Qualification to EHF Champions League group stage
2	Montpellier AHB	26	21	2	3	801	683	118	44	Qualification to EHF Champions League group stage
3	Saint-Raphaël VHB	26	15	4	7	775	754	21	34	Qualification to EHF Cup round 2
4	Chambéry SH	26	16	1	9	703	682	21	33	Qualification to EHF Cup round 2
5	Dunkerque HGL	26	16	0	10	661	639	22	32	-
6	HBC Nantes	26	13	3	9	737	713	24	31	Qualification to EHF Cup round 2
7	Cesson Rennes MHB	26	10	4	12	651	674	-23	24	-
8	USAM Nîmes	26	10	3	13	738	744	-6	23	-
9	US Créteil Handball	26	9	3	14	724	751	-27	21	-
10	Fenix Toulouse Handball	26	8	4	14	749	753	-4	20	-
11	Tremblay-en-France Handball	26	9	2	15	703	748	-45	20	-
12	Pays d'Aix UC	26	8	3	15	737	777	-40	19	-
13	Sélestat Alsace HB	26	5	0	21	688	795	-107	10	Relegation to the 2015–16 LNH Division 2
14	Istres Provence Handball	26	3	2	21	691	826	-135	8	Relegation to the 2015–16 LNH Division 2

Pld - Played; W - Won; D - Drawn; L - Lost; GF - Goals for; GA - Goals against; Diff - Difference; Pts - Points.
(C) = Champion; (R) = Relegated; (P) = Promoted; (E) = Eliminated; (O) = Play-off winner; (A) = Advances to a further round.

=== Schedule and results ===
In the table below the home teams are listed on the left and the away teams along the top.

	Aix	CessR	Cha	Cré	Dunk	Istr	Mon	Nan	Nîm	PSG	St-R	Sél	Tou	Tre
Aix		32–29	26–31	29–26	20–27	30–31	22–33	31–36	28–34	29–30	29–35	33–27	27–27	33–28
Cesson Rennes	24–24		23–21	26–23	21–22	29–21	27–27	25–30	29–27	23–26	23–23	27–31	25–24	25–29
Chambéry	29–28	17–18		28–26	25–24	22–22	29–27	25–24	28–21	33–32	29–26	30–24	33–24	29–30
US Créteil	31–29	25–26	35–31		21–28	24–24	30–34	25–28	28–27	21–29	35–35	41–31	31–28	25–23
Dunkerque	31–23	21–22	17–21	27–26		30–25	24–30	27–25	27–25	27–26	33–36	24–19	27–24	27–18
Istres	28–35	22–26	26–34	26–30	25–32		26–32	29–32	27–35	24–28	32–33	33–27	28–31	26–30
Montpellier	35–28	36–27	32–22	30–24	28–21	38–26		30–21	34–26	28–32	32–28	34–24	31–30	31–30
Nantes	33–25	–	29–30	–	–	33–24	27–27		–	26–27	29–24	30–23	–	–
USAM Nîmes	24–28	25–25	–	27–27	–	–	–	33–31		30–35	–	26–32	33–33	29–21
Paris Saint-Germain	31–27	35–19	–	–	–	–	36–20	33–21	–		–	–	34–31	35–26
Saint-Raphaël	–	31–29	–	–	–	–	27–34	–	37–34	32–31		31–22	33–28	32–30
Sélestat	26–29	24–32	29–31	–	24–27	35–30	–	–	–	29–43	–		22–26	–
Toulouse	–	–	26–23	40–26	33–25	29–30	28–34	25–25	–	–	–	–		32–34
Tremblay	27–27	22–19	–	23–22	27–24	–	–	23–24	–	–	28–28	23–25	–	

== Number of teams by regions ==
	Region	No. teams	Teams
1	Île-de-France	3	US Créteil, Paris Saint-Germain and Tremblay
1	Provence-Alpes-Côte d'Azur	3	Aix, Istres and Saint-Raphaël
3	Languedoc-Roussillon	2	Montpellier and USAM Nîmes
4	Alsace	1	Sélestat
4	Brittany	1	Cesson-Rennes
4	Nord-Pas-de-Calais	1	Dunkerque
4	Midi-Pyrénées	1	Toulouse
4	Pays de la Loire	1	Nantes
4	Rhône-Alpes	1	Chambéry
