= Dublin International Handball Club =

Dublin International HC
- Type: Sports association
- Legal status: Handball Club
- Purpose: Development of Handball in Dublin
- Location: Dublin
- Website: http://dublinhandball.com/

Dublin International HC (men)
- Founded: 2007
- Arena: Phibblestown Community Center
- Head coach: Boris Selak
- League: Irish national league
- 2015–16: 1st
- Club colours
Home	Away

Dublin International HC (women)
- Founded: 2013
- Arena: Phibblestown Community Center
- Head coach: Eva Herczegne Dajka
- League: Irish national league
- 2015–16: 1st
- Club colours
Home	Away

Dublin International Handball Club or DIHC is a Dublin based "team" handball club and a member of the Irish Olympic Handball Association.

DI HC was founded in 2007, as a result of a failed deal with DIT (Dublin Institute of Technology), whose name was used previously. DIT was the first Irish team to compete in European Cup.

Since its creation, the men's team won 7 All-Ireland championships and 4 Irish cups. They have also participated in 3 EHF challenge cups.

The women's team, created in 2013, have won two All-Ireland championships (in 2015 and 2016) and one Irish cup (in 2016).

In 2015, a young section was created in the Blanchardstown area of Dublin 15.

== History ==
=== 1999–2007: DIT Scorpions ===
The club was established in 1999 as DIT Handball Club. Halfway through its first season, 1999 / 2000, the club was renamed to DIT Scorpions in order to avoid being mistaken as a Gaelic handball club.

In the 2001/02 season, the club recorded its first ever win, and managed to claim 2nd place in Ireland's second division after losing the division final to Dagda.

In 2006/07 the club won its first Irish championship. During the following season, DIT took part in the EHF challenge cup, and in doing so, became the first Irish handball club to compete in a European competition.

=== 2007–2008: Split from DIT ===
After the 2006/07 season, DIT Scorpions decided to end their affiliation with DIT. Given its international mix of players, the club was renamed Dublin International Handball Club (DIHC).

In its maiden season as DIHC, the club finished as runners up to Lughnasa Handball Club in the national league.

=== 2008–2013: National competition ===
From the start of the 2008/09 campaign to the final of the 2012/13, the club remained unbeaten in all Irish competitions and recorded 4 successive national championships. In 2012 and 2013 the club also won the first two editions of the IOHA cup. The unbeaten run came to an end in the all-Ireland final of the 2012/13 season, where Astra Handball Club clinched the Irish championship by winning 35-31 after extra time.

Between 2009 and 2011, DIHC took part in the EHF Challenge Cup over three successive seasons. By recording a 30-26 win over Olympia Handball Club (ENG), the club became only the second ever Irish team to win in a European competition.

Also in 2009, Dublin International Handball Club organize the first, and so far only, Anglo Irish cup against london great dane, the English team won the trophy after an intense match 32-35.

=== Since 2013: Consolidation and expansion ===
With the start of the 2012/2013 season, DIHC permanently relocated to train and play out of Phibblestown Community Centre. This enabled the club to expand by launching a women's team in 2013 and a junior section in 2015.

The 2013/2014 season saw the men's team bounce back and regain their title after another close final against Astra Handball Club. The same season also ended in the club's third successive IOHA Cup win, and a third place IOHA cup finish for the women's team.

In 2014/15, DIHC won both the men's and women's all-Ireland championship.

== European participation ==
DIHC, and its predecessor DIT Scorpions, participated in a number of EHF Challenge Cups:

- 2006/07 in Hamm (Germany) as DIT with matches against Locomotiv-Polyot Cheljabinsk (RUS), TIME Burevestnik, Luhansk (UKR) and University of Manchester HC (GBR).
- 2009/2010 in Sisak (Croatia) with matches against Drammen HK (NO), Pals Groep (NED) and RK Siscia (CRO).
- 2010/2011 in Buzet (Croatia) with matches against HC Polytechnik (UKR), Olympia Handball (GBR) and Buzet (CRO).
- 2011/2012 in Msida (Malta) with matches against London GD HC (GBR), Ruislip Eagles HC (GBR) and Aloysians ProMinent (MLT).

== Club honours ==
=== Men's First Team ===
- All-Ireland championships (7): 2009, 2010, 2011, 2012, 2014, 2015, 2016
- IOHA cup (4): 2012, 2013, 2014, 2016

=== Women's First Team ===
- All-Ireland championships (2): 2015, 2016
- IOHA Cup (1): 2016
- Edinburgh International Handball tournament (1): 2015
