= 2015–16 Superliga (men's handball) =

Polish Superliga
- Season: 2015–16
- Dates: 2 September 2015 – 18 May 2016
- Champions: Vive Tauron Kielce (13th title)
- Relegated: Śląsk Wrocław; PGE Stal Mielec
- Champions League: Vive Tauron Kielce; Orlen Wisła Płock
- EHF Cup: Azoty Puławy; Górnik Zabrze
- Matches played: 174
- Goals scored: 9,652 (55.47 per match)
- Top goalscorer: Vitaliy Titov (173 goals)

The 2015–16 Superliga was the 60th season of the Polish Superliga, the top men's handball league in Poland. A total of twelve teams contested this season's league, which began on 2 September 2015 and concluded on 18 May 2016.

Vive Tauron Kielce won their 13th title of the Polish Champions.

== Regular season ==
=== Standings ===
Pos	Team	Pld	W	D	L	GF	GA	GD	Pts	Qualification
1	Vive Tauron Kielce	22	20	1	1	765	573	+192	41	Quarterfinals
2	Orlen Wisła Płock	22	20	1	1	733	522	+211	41	Quarterfinals
3	Azoty Puławy	22	16	1	5	669	598	+71	33	Quarterfinals
4	MMTS Kwidzyn	22	11	1	10	583	596	−13	23	Quarterfinals
5	KPR Legionowo	22	10	2	10	571	588	−17	22	Quarterfinals
6	Chrobry Głogów	22	9	3	10	556	572	−16	21	Quarterfinals
7	Górnik Zabrze	22	9	3	10	693	679	+14	21	Quarterfinals
8	Zagłębie Lubin	22	8	2	12	540	587	−47	18	Quarterfinals
9	Gwardia Opole	22	8	1	13	547	587	−40	17	Relegation round
10	Pogoń Szczecin	22	7	1	14	561	600	−39	15	Relegation round
11	PGE Stal Mielec	22	4	0	18	562	687	−125	8	Relegation round
12	Śląsk Wrocław	22	2	0	20	513	704	−191	4	Relegation round

Source: PGNiG Superliga

=== Results ===
Home \ Away	PUL	GLO	ZAB	OPO	LEG	KWI	PLO	SZC	MIE	WRO	KIE	LUB
Azoty Puławy		36–22	38–28	33–22	29–26	32–27	23–32	25–22	33–24	26–20	25–29	28–28
Chrobry Głogów	26–35		29–28	30–26	26–26	26–27	20–30	19–20	35–27	25–15	30–31	26–26
Górnik Zabrze	36–39	19–25		32–31	35–34	33–33	34–34	36–28	33–27	47–24	34–38	32–30
Gwardia Opole	22–27	23–23	31–29		25–18	23–19	22–28	24–23	34–22	27–26	26–38	25–39
KPR Legionowo	23–26	28–22	27–27	20–19		28–24	19–27	24–23	27–19	30–23	25–35	22–24
MMTS Kwidzyn	32–29	22–26	31–26	25–23	32–25		22–34	29–26	28–27	31–19	25–32	24–22
Orlen Wisła Płock	35–33	35–23	31–25	34–17	33–27	31–23		35–25	42–22	47–19	31–27	33–18
Pogoń Szczecin	24–30	25–28	26–30	27–22	23–29	27–20	22–40		37–28	35–25	27–27	25–27
PGE Stal Mielec	28–24	27–30	30–39	23–24	30–32	31–23	23–36	29–21		24–30	19–38	27–25
Śląsk Wrocław	27–38	25–30	26–33	20–30	28–32	16–33	26–35	20–29	25–29		28–39	31–21
Vive Tauron Kielce	41–28	33–23	37–28	37–28	34–20	38–28	32–22	32–24	41–32	37–20		37–22
Zagłębie Lubin	27–28	17–15	30–29	24–23	24–29	22–25	20–28	21–22	29–26	26–20	28–32	

Source: PGNiG Superliga
Legend: Blue = home team win; Yellow = draw; Red = away team win.

== Relegation round ==
=== Standings ===
Pos	Team	Pld	W	D	L	GF	GA	GD	Pts	Qualification
1	Gwardia Opole	28	13	1	14	727	733	−6	27	
2	Pogoń Szczecin	28	11	1	16	752	758	−6	23	Relegation playoffs
3	PGE Stal Mielec	28	7	0	21	716	839	−123	14	Relegation
4	Śląsk Wrocław	28	2	0	26	646	906	−260	4	Relegation

Source: PGNiG Superliga

=== Results ===
Home \ Away	OPO	SZC	MIE	WRO
Gwardia Opole		29–28	29–22	38–26
Pogoń Szczecin	33–30		27–30	38–18
PGE Stal Mielec	19–23	25–28		27–20
Śląsk Wrocław	18–31	26–37	25–31	

Source: PGNiG Superliga
Legend: Blue = home team win; Red = away team win.

=== Playoffs ===
Team 1	Agg.	Team 2	1st leg	2nd leg
Traveland Olsztyn	53–61	Pogoń Szczecin	30–29	23–32

== Playoffs ==
Quarterfinals
1	Vive Tauron Kielce	40	34	2
8	Zagłębie Lubin	25	24	0
5	KPR Legionowo	26	17	43
4	MMTS Kwidzyn	22	26	48
3	Azoty Puławy	32	33	2
6	Chrobry Głogów	27	30	0
7	Górnik Zabrze	29	23	0
2	Orlen Wisła Płock	32	35	2

Semifinals
1	Vive Tauron Kielce	38	29	40	3
4	MMTS Kwidzyn	25	23	19	0
3	Azoty Puławy	34	32	22	0
2	Orlen Wisła Płock	35	36	25	3

Finals
1	Vive Tauron Kielce	35	33	27	3
2	Orlen Wisła Płock	29	26	25	0
Third place
3	Azoty Puławy	31	29	27	25	33	3
4	MMTS Kwidzyn	22	31	28	24	24	2

== Final standings ==
Qualified for the 2016–17 EHF Champions League
Qualified for the 2016–17 EHF Cup
Relegation to the 1st league

Rank	Team
1	Vive Tauron Kielce
2	Orlen Wisła Płock
3	Azoty Puławy
4	MMTS Kwidzyn
5	Górnik Zabrze
6	KPR Legionowo
7	Zagłębie Lubin
8	Chrobry Głogów
9	Gwardia Opole
10	Pogoń Szczecin
11	PGE Stal Mielec
12	Śląsk Wrocław
