= B.S.B. Batumi =

- Full name: შავი ზღვის ბიჭები, ბათუმი, Black Sea Bichebi Batumi
- Head coach: Merab Chanturia
- League: National Handball Championship
- 2015-16: 1st
- Club colours

Black Sea Bichebi Batumi (Georgian: შავი ზღვის ბიჭები, ბათუმი, romanized: shavi zghvis bich'ebi, batumi) (Black Sea Guys of Batumi), most commonly known as B.S.B. Batumi, is a Georgian handball team from Batumi. They compete in the National Handball Championship of Georgia.

== Crest, colours, supporters ==
=== Kits ===
HOME

2018–19

AWAY

2018–19

== European record ==
Season	Competition	Round	Club	1st leg	2nd leg	Aggregate
2016–17	EHF Cup	R1	(Portugal) FC Porto	16–49	16–44	32–93

== Team ==
=== Squad ===
Squad for the 2016–17 season

Goalkeepers

- (Georgia (country)) Korneli Andriadze
- (Georgia (country)) Giorgi Samkurashvili

Wingers
RW

- (Georgia (country)) Irakli Gogoladze
- (Georgia (country)) Igor Vinogradski

LW

- (Georgia (country)) Zurab Abramishvili

Line players

- (Georgia (country)) Shota Grishikasvili
- (Georgia (country)) Ucha Maisuradze

Back players
LB

- (Georgia (country)) Rezo Chanturia
- (Georgia (country)) Akaki Kavelashvili
- (Georgia (country)) George Kvernadze

CB

- (Georgia (country)) Ilia Gogaladze
- (Georgia (country)) George Kobakhidze
- (Georgia (country)) Giorgi Surmava
- (Georgia (country)) Georgi Omar Tsivtsivadze

RB

- (Georgia (country)) Levan Berdzenishvili
- (Georgia (country)) Nano Kardava
