= Zvonimir Serdarušić =

Croatian handball player

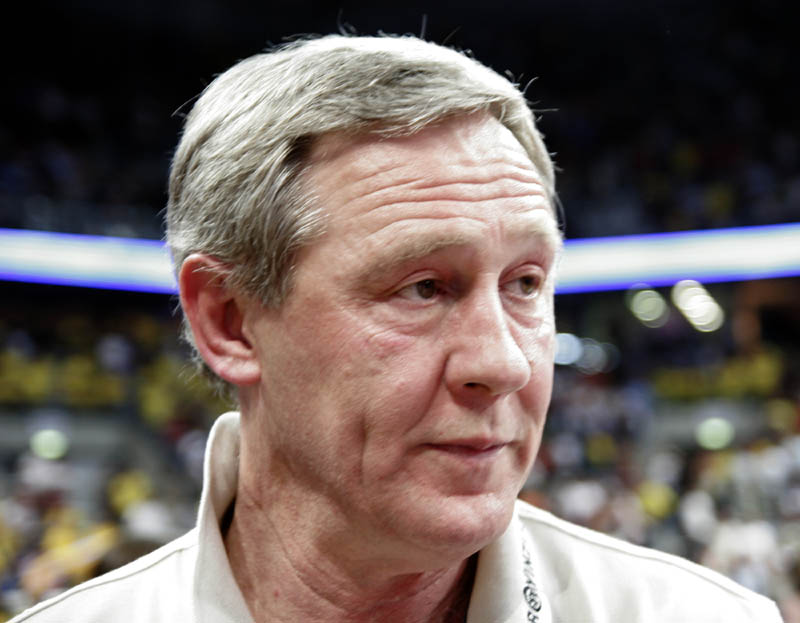
- Serdarušić coaching THW Kiel in 2007

Personal information
- Full name: Zvonimir Serdarušić
- Nationality: Croatian / German
- Born: 2 September 1950 (age 76) Mostar, PR Bosnia and Herzegovina, FPR Yugoslavia
- Height: 1.86 m (6 ft 1 in)

Sport
- Sport: Handball
- Position: Pivot

Senior clubs
- Years: Team
- 1967–1970: RK Velež Mostar
- 1970–1973: RK Bosna Sarajevo
- 1973–1980: Partizan Bjelovar
- 1980–1981: THW Kiel
- 1981–1984: Füchse Berlin
National team
Years	Team	Apps
1973–1978	Yugoslavia	79

Teams managed
- 1984–1986: RK Velež Mostar
- 1986–1989: Mehanika Metković
- 1989–1990: VfL Bad Schwartau
- 1990–1993: SG Flensburg-Handewitt
- 1993–2008: THW Kiel
- 2009–2010: Slovenia
- 2010: RK Celje
- 2014–2015: Pays d'Aix
- 2015–2018: Paris Saint-Germain
Medal record
Men's handball
Representing Yugoslavia
World Championship
Bronze medal – third place	1974 East Germany
Mediterranean Games
Gold medal – first place	1975 Algeria

Zvonimir Serdarušić (pronounced [zʋônimiːr serdǎruʃitɕ]; born 2 September 1950) is a Croatian former professional handball coach and player who competed in the 1976 Summer Olympics for Yugoslavia. In May 1998, he also acquired German citizenship.

== Career ==
=== Yugoslavia ===
Serdarušić began his handball career in RK Velež from Mostar. After three seasons he moved to RK Bosna Sarajevo. In two seasons with Bosna Sarajevo he moved up from the third league to the first. In 1973 Serdarušić moved to Partizan Bjelovar. He stayed at the club for seven years winning the First League twice in 1977 and 1979, and the Cup once in 1977.

=== Germany ===
In 1981 he spent one season with THW Kiel before moving to Füchse Berlin Reinickendorf HBC, where he got to the semifinal of the IHF Cup in 1983, and the final of the DHB-Pokal in 1984 before retiring.

He also played a match for the world all star team.

=== Appearances and goals ===
- THW Kiel (1980–1981): 26 (99)
- Füchse Berlin Reinickendorf HBC (1981–1984): 73 (182)

== International career ==
Seradušić first appeared at the 1974 World Championship in East Germany. There Yugoslavia won the bronze medal defeating Poland by a scoreline of 18–16.

He was part of the Yugoslav team which finished fifth in the 1976 Summer Olympic Games tournament. He played all six matches and scored 17 goals. Currently, Serdarušić is considered one of the top handball coaches in the world. He also played at the 1975 Mediterranean Games where he won a gold medal. His last tournament for the national team was at the 1978 World Championship where Yugoslavia finished in fifth place.

== Controversy ==
Serdarušić was charged with allegedly having bribed referees in ten championship matches in 2010, while at THW Kiel. However, he was officially cleared in 2012.

== Honours ==
=== Player ===
Bosna Sarajevo

- Yugoslav Second League: 1971–72
- Yugoslav Third League: 1970–71

Partizan Bjelovar

- Yugoslav First League: 1976–77, 1978–79
- Yugoslav Cup: 1976–77

Füchse Berlin

- DHB-Pokal finalist: 1984

=== Coach ===
Velež Mostar

- Yugoslav Third League: 1984–85

Bad Schwartau

- 2nd Bundesliga - North: 1989–90

Flensburg-Handewitt

- 2nd Bundesliga - North: 1991–92

THW Kiel

- Bundesliga: 1993–94, 1994–95, 1995–96, 1997–98, 1998–99, 1999–00, 2001–02, 2004–05, 2005–06, 2006–07, 2007–08
- DHB-Pokal: 1998, 1999, 2000, 2007, 2008
- German Super Cup: 1995, 1998, 2005, 2007, 2008
- EHF Champions League: 2006–07
- EHF Champions Trophy: 2007
- EHF Cup: 1998, 2002, 2004

Celje

- Slovenian First League: 2009–10
- Slovenian Cup: 2010
- Slovenian Super Cup: 2010

Paris Saint-Germain

- LNH Division 1: 2015–16, 2016–17
- Coupe de France: 2018
- Coupe de la Ligue: 2017, 2018
- Trophée des champions: 2016

Individual

- Best coach of Bundesliga: 2006, 2007, 2008
- Coach of the Year in Germany: 1996, 1999, 2005, 2006, 2007
