= Irish Olympic Handball Association =

Governing body for team (Olympic) handball on the island of Ireland

Irish Olympic Handball Association (IOHA)
- Type: Sports association
- Legal status: Federation
- Purpose: Development of Handball in Ireland
- Location: Ireland
- Region served: Ireland; Northern Ireland
- Official language: English

The Irish Olympic Handball Association (IOHA) is a governing body of team or Olympic handball on the island of Ireland. It is a member of the European Handball Federation (EHF). Established in 1975, the IOHA is recognised by the Irish Sports Council, Olympic Council of Ireland, the European Handball Federation and the International Handball Federation (IHF) as the sole governing body for the sport of Olympic handball in the Republic of Ireland and Northern Ireland.

== Irish Men National League ==
Year	Champion	Runner-up	3rd Place
2000-01	N/A	N/A	N/A
2001-02	Dublin City University	Lughnasa Handball Club	N/A
2002-03	Dublin City University	Lughnasa Handball Club	N/A
2003-04	N/A	N/A	N/A
2004-05	N/A	N/A	N/A
2005-06	N/A	N/A	N/A
2006-07	Dublin International Handball Club	N/A	N/A
2007-08	N/A	N/A	N/A
2008-09	Dublin International Handball Club	N/A	N/A
2009-10	Dublin International Handball Club	N/A	N/A
2010-11	Dublin International Handball Club	N/A	N/A
2011-12	Dublin International Handball Club	N/A	N/A
2012-13	Astra Handball Club	Dublin International Handball Club	Lughnasa Handball Club
2013-14	Dublin International Handball Club	Astra Handball Club	Lughnasa Handball Club
2014-15	Dublin International Handball Club	UCD Olympic Handball	Lughnasa Handball Club
2015-16	Dublin International Handball Club	UCD Olympic Handball	Astra Handball Club
2016-17	Dublin City Handball	Astra Handball Club	

== Men's IOHA Cup ==
Year	Champion	Runner-up	3rd Place
2009-10	N/A	N/A	N/A
2010-11	N/A	N/A	N/A
2011-12	N/A	N/A	N/A
2012-13	Dublin International Handball Club	Astra Handball Club	Lughnasa Handball Club
2013-14	Dublin International Handball Club	Astra Handball Club	Lughnasa Handball Club

== Women IOHA Cup ==
Year	Champion	Runner-up	3rd Place
2012-13			
2013-14	Astra Handball Club	Lughnasa Handball Club	Dublin International Handball Club
