= Uwe Gensheimer =

German handball player (born 1986)

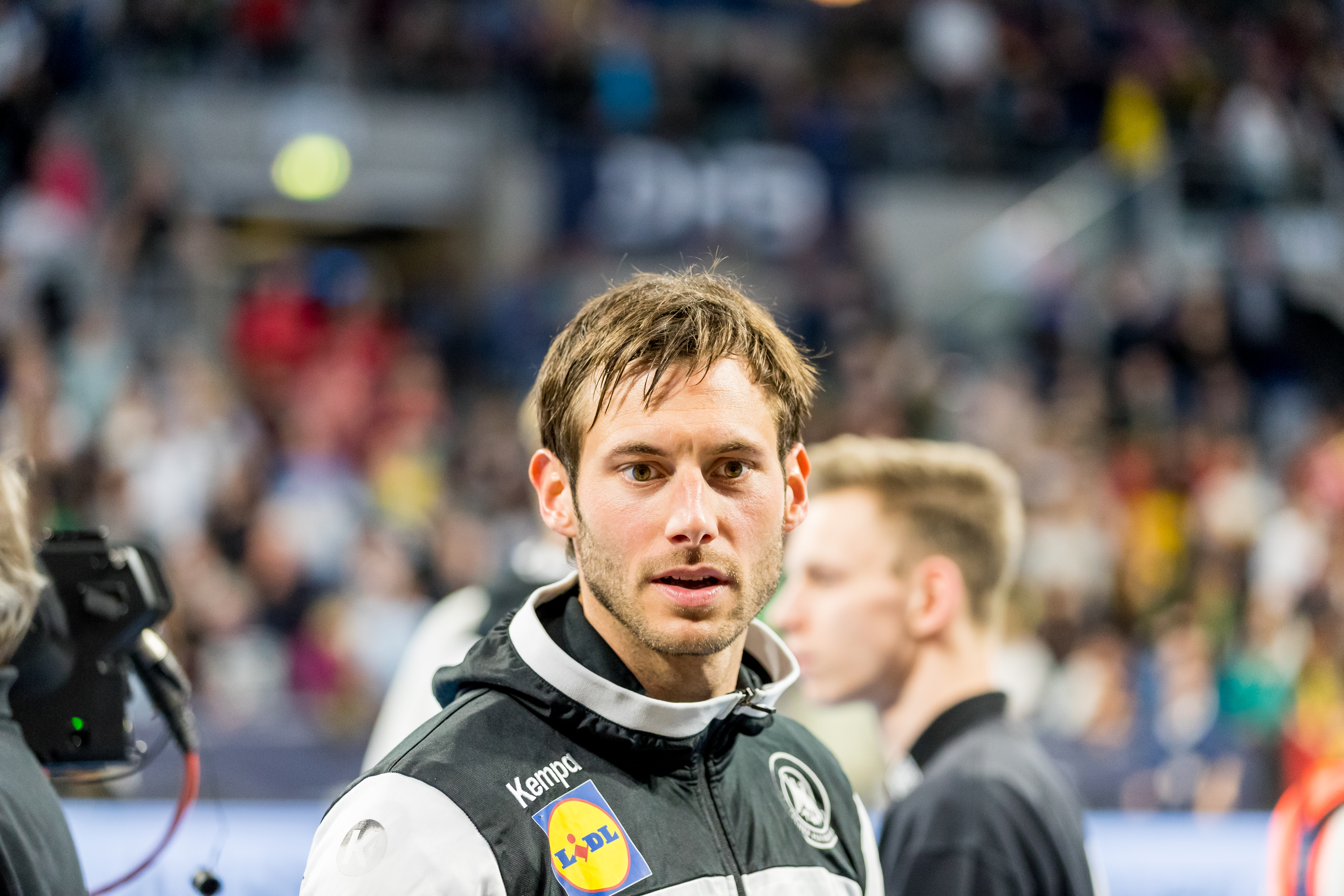
- Gensheimer in 2020

Personal information
- Nationality: German
- Born: 26 October 1986 (age 39) Mannheim, West Germany
- Height: 1.88 m (6 ft 2 in)

Sport
- Sport: Handball
- Position: Left wing

Youth career
- Years: Team
- 1997–2003: TV 1892 Friedrichsfeld
- –: SG Kronau/Östringen

Senior clubs
- Years: Team
- 2003–2016: Rhein-Neckar Löwen
- 2016–2019: Paris Saint-Germain
- 2019–2024: Rhein-Neckar Löwen
National team
Years	Team	Apps	(Gls)
2005–2021	Germany	204	(921)
Medal record
Olympic Games
Bronze medal – third place	2016 Rio de Janeiro	Team
Junior European Championship
Gold medal – first place	2006 Austria
Junior World Championship
Silver medal – second place	2007 North Macedonia

Uwe Gensheimer (born 26 October 1986) is a German former professional handball player. Gensheimer is considered to be one of the best players in his position all-time, especially known by his "magic wrist" because of his ability to spin his shots. He captained both the German national team and his club Rhein-Neckar Löwen. On May 31, 2024, he retired, playing his last game against SC Magdeburg.

Since his retirement from playing he has been the sporting director at his former club Rhein-Neckar Löwen.

== Career ==
Gensheimer started playing handball aged 5 at TV 1892 Friedrichsfeld. In 2003 he joined the youth ranks of the Bundesliga team SG Kronau-Östringen (later called Rhein-Necker Löwen). In his first season he won the Baden and South German youth championship and made his senior debut. In the 2004 season he was promoted from the 2nd Bundesliga liga, but he was relegated in the following season.

In 2006, 2007 and 2010 he reached the finals of the DHB-Pokal, but would lose all of them to either HSV Hambourg or THW Kiel. In 2013 he won his first title, when Rhein-Neckar Löwen won the 2012-13 EHF European Cup. In 2016 he was part of the team that won Löwen's first ever German Championship, as they beat SG Flensburg by a one point.

The following summer he joined French top team PSG Handball. In his first season he won the domestic double. In the 2016-17 EHF Champions League they reached the final, but they suffered a surprising defeat to RK Vardar. The following season they went out in the semifinal to league rivals HBC Nantes.

On 30 January 2019 he announced that he would return to Rhein-Neckar Löwen the following summer, on a contract until 2022. In December 2021 he extended his contract until 2024. His first seasons back with the Löwen was rather mixed, but in 2023 they won the DHB-Pokal beating SC Magdeburg after extra time and penalties.

Before the 2023-24 Bundesliga season Gensheimer underwent surgery due to a recurrring knee injury. He was expected to return for the second half of season, but due to setbacks during rehabilition, he announced his retirement on December 8, 2023. On 30 May 2024 he played his last home game, although he only played for a few minutes to say goodbye to the fans.

=== National team ===
He made his international debut on 25 November 2005 against Slovenia. In 2021 he announced the end of his time in the national team, where he was the captain from 2014. He has the sescond most goals on the German National team with 204, only behind Christian Schwarzer with 966.

He played at the 2010 and 2012 European Championships, and the 2011, 2015, 2017, and 2019 World Championships. He missed the 2016 European Men's Handball Championship, where Germany won gold medals, due to injury.

At the 2016 Summer Olympics he won bronze medals with Germany, for which he was awarded the Silbernes Lorbeerblatt.

=== Seasonal statistics ===
Season	Team	League	Games	Goals	7M	Outfield goals	Goal average
2003/04	SG Kronau/Östringen	Bundesliga	6	7	2	5	1.2
2004/05	SG Kronau/Östringen	2. BL Süd	33	203	57	146	6.2
2005/06	SG Kronau/Östringen	Bundesliga	30	168	58	110	5.6
2006/07	SG Kronau/Östringen	Bundesliga	33	129	11	118	3.9
2007/08	Rhein-Neckar Löwen	Bundesliga	32	128	0	128	4.0
2008/09	Rhein-Neckar Löwen	Bundesliga	33	132	3	129	4.0
2009/10	Rhein-Neckar Löwen	Bundesliga	34	214	98	116	6.3
2010/11	Rhein-Neckar Löwen	Bundesliga	34	214	81	133	6.3
2011/12	Rhein-Neckar Löwen	Bundesliga	33	247	84	163	7.5
2012/13	Rhein-Neckar Löwen	Bundesliga	16	105	37	68	6.6
2013/14	Rhein-Neckar Löwen	Bundesliga	31	209	75	134	6.7
2014/15	Rhein-Neckar Löwen	Bundesliga	36	218	89	129	6.1
2015/16	Rhein-Neckar Löwen	Bundesliga	29	197	87	110	6.8
2016/17	Paris Saint-Germain	Starligue	24	167	55	112	7.0
2017/18	Paris Saint-Germain	Starligue	23	115	26	89	5.0
2018/19	Paris Saint-Germain	Starligue	24	117	53	64	4.9
2019/20	Rhein-Neckar Löwen	Bundesliga	22	134	59	75	6.1
2020/21	Rhein-Neckar Löwen	Bundesliga	30	163	69	94	5.4
2021/22	Rhein-Neckar Löwen	Bundesliga	12	62	24	38	5.2
2022/23	Rhein-Neckar Löwen	Bundesliga	23	107	47	60	4.7
2023/24	Rhein-Neckar Löwen	Bundesliga	1	4	2	2	
Total		Bundesliga	435	2438	826	1612	5.6
Total			539	3040	1017	2023	5.6
Average per season (excluding 2023/24)			26.9	151.8	50.8	101.1	

== Team awards ==
=== Club ===
- EHF Cup:
  - 2012–13
- German Championship:
  - 2015–16
- German Cup:
  - 2022–23
- French Championship:
  - 2016–17, 2017–18, 2018–19
- Coupe de France:
  - 2017–18
- Coupe de la Ligue:
  - 2016–17, 2017–18, 2018–19

=== International ===
- Summer Olympics:
  - Bronze: 2016
- Junior European Championship:
  - Gold: 2006
- Junior World Championship:
  - Silver: 2007

== Awards ==
- Handball player of the year in Germany: 2011, 2012, 2013, 2014
- EHF Champions League Top Scorer: 2011, 2017, 2018
- EHF Champions League team of the season: 2018,2017
- MVP of the Junior World Championship: 2007
- All-Star left wing of the Junior European Championship: 2006
- Youth European Championship Top Scorer: 2004
- Bundesliga Player of the Season: 2010–11
- 2016 Olympics all star team.
