= 2015–16 LNH Division 1 =

LNH Division 1
- Season: 2015-16
- Champions: PSG
- Matches: 182
- Goals: 9,671 (53.14 per match)
- Top goalscorer: (Denmark) Mikkel Hansen (219 goals)

The 2015–16 LNH Division 1 was the 64th season of the LNH Division 1, the French premier handball league, and the 39th season consisting of only one league. It ran from 21 August 2015 to 4 June 2016.

== Team information ==
Locations of the 2015-16 LNH Division 1 teams

The following 14 clubs competed in the LNH Division 1 during the 2015–16 season:

Team	Location	Arena	Capacity
Aix	Aix-en-Provence	Complexe sportif du Val de l'Arc	1,650
Cesson-Rennes	Rennes	Palais des sports de la Valette; Le Liberté	1,400; 4,000
Chambéry	Chambéry	Le Phare	4,400
Chartres MHB 28	Morancez	Halle Jean Cochet	1,200
US Créteil	Créteil	Palais des Sports Robert Oubron	2,500
Dunkerque	Dunkerque	Stade des Flandres	2,400
US Ivry	Ivry-sur-Seine	Gymnase Auguste-Delaune	1,500
Montpellier	Montpellier	Palais des sports René-Bougnol; Park&Suites Arena	3,000; 8,000
Nantes	Nantes	Palais des Sports; Halle XXL de la Beaujoire	5,000; 9,000
USAM Nîmes	Nîmes	Le Parnasse	3,391
Paris Saint-Germain	Paris	Stade Pierre de Coubertin; Halle Georges Carpentier	3,402; 4,300
Saint Raphaël	Saint-Raphaël	Palais des sports J-F Krakowski	2,000
Fenix Toulouse	Toulouse	Palais des Sports André Brouat	4,200
Tremblay	Tremblay-en-France	Palais des sports	1,100

== League table ==
Pos	Team	Pld	W	D	L	GF	GA	GD	Pts	Qualification or relegation
1	Paris Saint-Germain	26	23	0	3	883	739	+144	46	Qualification to Champions League group stage
2	Saint Raphaël	26	16	4	6	749	713	+36	36	Qualification to EHF Cup third qualifying round
3	HBC Nantes	26	16	2	8	769	681	+88	34	Qualification to Champions League group stage
4	Montpellier	26	15	3	8	758	721	+37	33	Qualification to Champions League group stage
5	Chambéry	26	14	3	9	730	690	+40	31	Qualification to EHF Cup second qualifying round
6	Créteil	26	11	6	9	786	787	−1	28	Qualification to EHF Cup second qualifying round
7	Dunkerque	26	11	4	11	681	687	−6	26	
8	Cesson-Rennes	26	10	5	11	681	717	−36	25	
9	Toulouse	26	10	4	12	762	743	+19	24	
10	USAM Nîmes	26	9	4	13	767	779	−12	22	
11	Ivry	26	8	3	15	697	765	−68	19	
12	Aix	26	6	5	15	734	779	−45	17	
13	Chartres	26	5	2	19	674	784	−110	12	Relegation to 2016–17 LNH Division 2
14	Tremblay	26	5	1	20	725	811	−86	11	Relegation to 2016–17 LNH Division 2

Updated to match(es) played on 26 November 2015. Source: lnh.fr/championnat-d1m
Rules for classification: 1) Points; 2) Goal difference; 3) Goals scored.

=== Schedule and results ===
In the table below the home teams are listed on the left and the away teams along the top.

	AIX	CES	CHA	CHR	CRÉ	DUN	IVR	MON	NAN	NIM	PSG	STR	TOU	TRE
Aix		28–19	26–30	37–24	33–37	27–27	24–30	26–30	34–34	33–28	25–35	28–38	30–30	27–26
Cesson-Rennes	23–23		27–25	25–29	29–36	25–23	27–23	27–27	32–29	28–28	33–36	28–27	28–28	27–20
Chambéry	31–28	27–19		34–24	31–27	22–19	28–20	25–35	34–29	29–25	25–30	31–24	28–27	31–32
Chartres	20–28	23–25	18–34		28–28	25–26	30–25	27–33	27–29	24–21	20–32	22–24	24–23	25–31
Créteil	31–29	29–26	27–27	39–35		31–26	30–36	27–24	25–26	31–31	34–32	26–30	31–31	30–24
Dunkerque	28–26	30–26	24–23	29–29	23–25		23–23	30–26	22–28	34–27	29–32	25–27	26–24	30–25
Ivry	34–30	23–26	27–30	34–29	32–31	22–24		25–30	23–40	35–36	27–33	30–30	33–29	29–24
Montpellier	37–30	36–29	27–27	31–25	33–30	29–29	31–23		0–20	30–27	32–31	27–28	32–34	37–33
Nantes	29–28	25–17	33–25	38–31	40–29	27–25	35–25	29–22		33–28	17–24	23–27	26–26	32–26
Nîmes	37–26	22–24	30–27	34–27	30–30	23–25	28–28	33–29	29–26		28–34	28–36	32–28	33–30
Paris	31–32	38–31	35–27	33–25	34–27	34–24	32–22	30–26	34–33	36–32		34–27	37–30	43–39
Saint Raphaël	25–25	27–27	24–24	29–25	32–29	29–28	31–23	25–34	28–25	35–33	29–32		28–29	26–21
Toulouse	33–23	31–26	28–27	29–22	30–31	27–28	31–21	29–30	33–29	33–27	33–38	26–28		34–31
Tremblay	32–28	24–27	25–28	33–36	35–35	25–24	23–24	22–30	27–34	28–37	32–43	30–35	27–26	

== Season statistics ==
=== Top goalscorers ===
Rank	Player	Club	Goals
1	(Denmark) Mikkel Hansen	Paris Saint-Germain	228
2	(Spain) Valero Rivera	Nantes	184
3	(Serbia) Nemanja Ilić	Toulouse	155
4	(France) Raphaël Caucheteux	Saint Raphaël	149
5	(Iceland) Snorri Stein Guðjónsson	Nîmes	136
6	(Slovenia) Dragan Gajić	Montpellier	130
7	(France) Nedim Remili	Créteil	128
8	(France) Arnaud Bingo	Tremblay-en-France	127
9	(Montenegro) Vasko Ševaljević	Toulouse	126
10	(France) Timothey N'Guessan	Chambéry	124

=== Monthly awards ===
Month	Player of the Month	
Month	Player	Club
September	(Slovenia) Jure Dolenec	Montpellier Handball
October	(France) Vincent Gérard	Montpellier Handball
November	(Argentina) Matías Schulz	HBC Nantes
December	(France) Nedim Remili	US Créteil
February	(France) Grégoire Detrez	Chambéry SH
March	(Spain) Valero Rivera	HBC Nantes
April	(France) Kevin Bonnefoi	Cesson Rennes

== Number of teams by regions ==
	Region	No. teams	Teams
1	Île-de-France	4	Créteil, Ivry, Paris and Tremblay
2	Languedoc-Roussillon	2	Montpellier and Nîmes
2	Provence-Alpes-Côte d'Azur	2	Aix and Saint-Raphaël
4	Brittany	1	Cesson-Rennes
4	Centre	1	Chartres
4	Midi-Pyrénées	1	Toulouse
4	Nord-Pas-de-Calais	1	Dunkerque
4	Pays de la Loire	1	Nantes
4	Rhône-Alpes	1	Chambéry
