= Mikkel Hansen =

Danish handball player (born 1987)

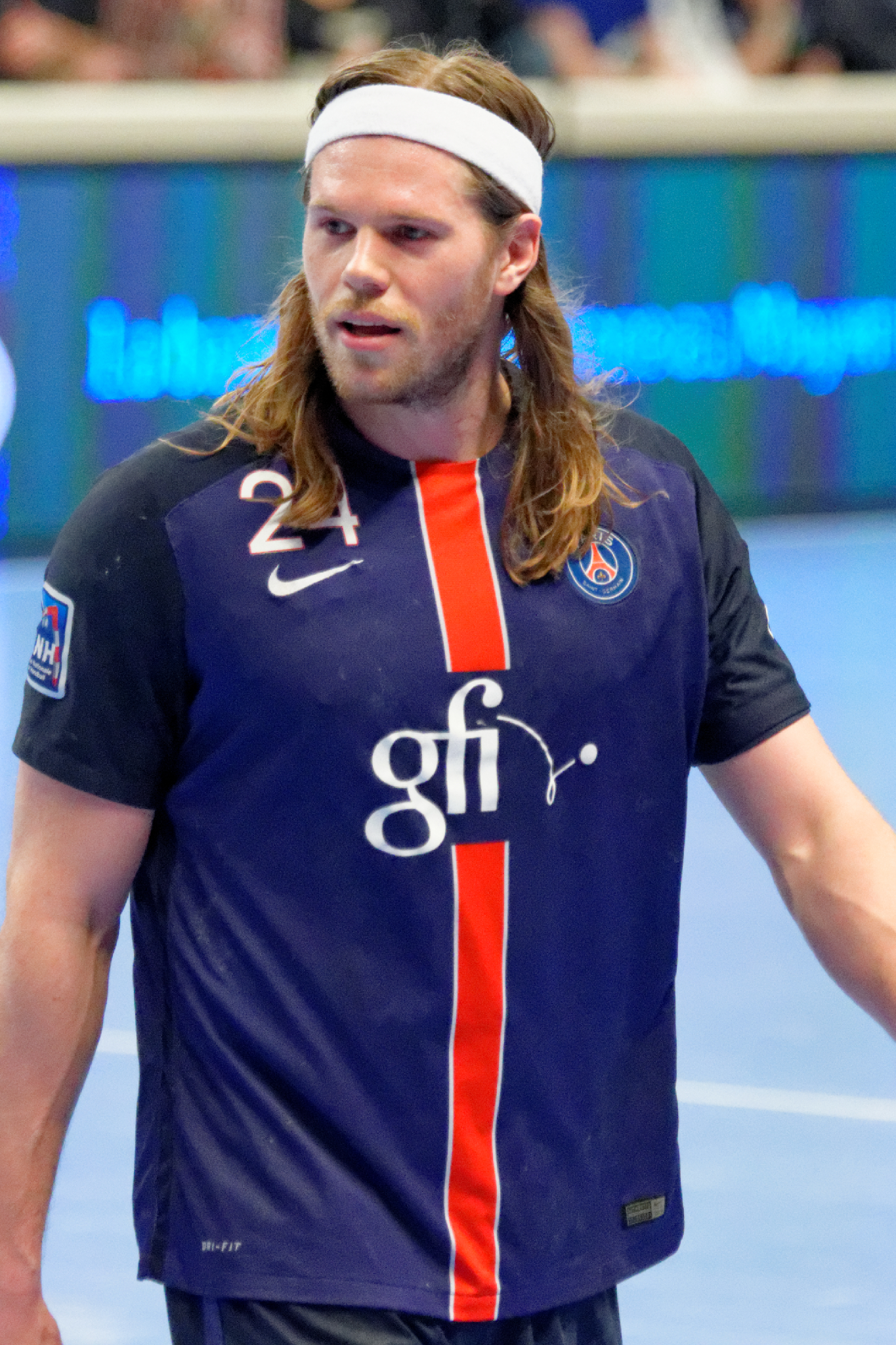
- Hansen playing for Paris Saint-Germain in 2016

Personal information
- Nationality: Danish
- Born: 22 October 1987 (age 38) Helsingør, Denmark
- Height: 1.92 m (6 ft 4 in)

Sport
- Sport: Handball
- Position: Left back

Youth career
- Years: Team
- 1997–2000: Helsingør IF
- 2000–2005: Virum-Sorgenfri HK

Senior clubs
- Years: Team
- 2005–2008: GOG Håndbold
- 2008–2010: FC Barcelona
- 2010–2012: AG København
- 2012–2022: Paris Saint-Germain
- 2022–2024: Aalborg Håndbold
National team
Years	Team	Apps	(Gls)
2007–2024	Denmark	276	(1387)
Medal record
Representing Denmark
Olympic Games
Gold medal – first place	2016 Rio de Janeiro	Team
Gold medal – first place	2024 Paris	Team
Silver medal – second place	2020 Tokyo	Team
World Championship
Gold medal – first place	2019 Denmark/Germany
Gold medal – first place	2021 Egypt
Gold medal – first place	2023 Poland/Sweden
Silver medal – second place	2011 Sweden
Silver medal – second place	2013 Spain
European Championship
Gold medal – first place	2012 Serbia
Silver medal – second place	2014 Denmark
Silver medal – second place	2024 Germany
Bronze medal – third place	2022 Hungary/Slovakia
- Updated on 11th August 2024

Mikkel Hansen (born 22 October 1987) is a Danish former professional handball player.

Hansen has won the IHF World Player of the Year a record-tying three times. He played as a left back for most of his career, but towards the end of his career he transitioned to play more as a centre back/playmaker.

He was inducted into the EHF Hall of Fame in 2024.

== Career ==
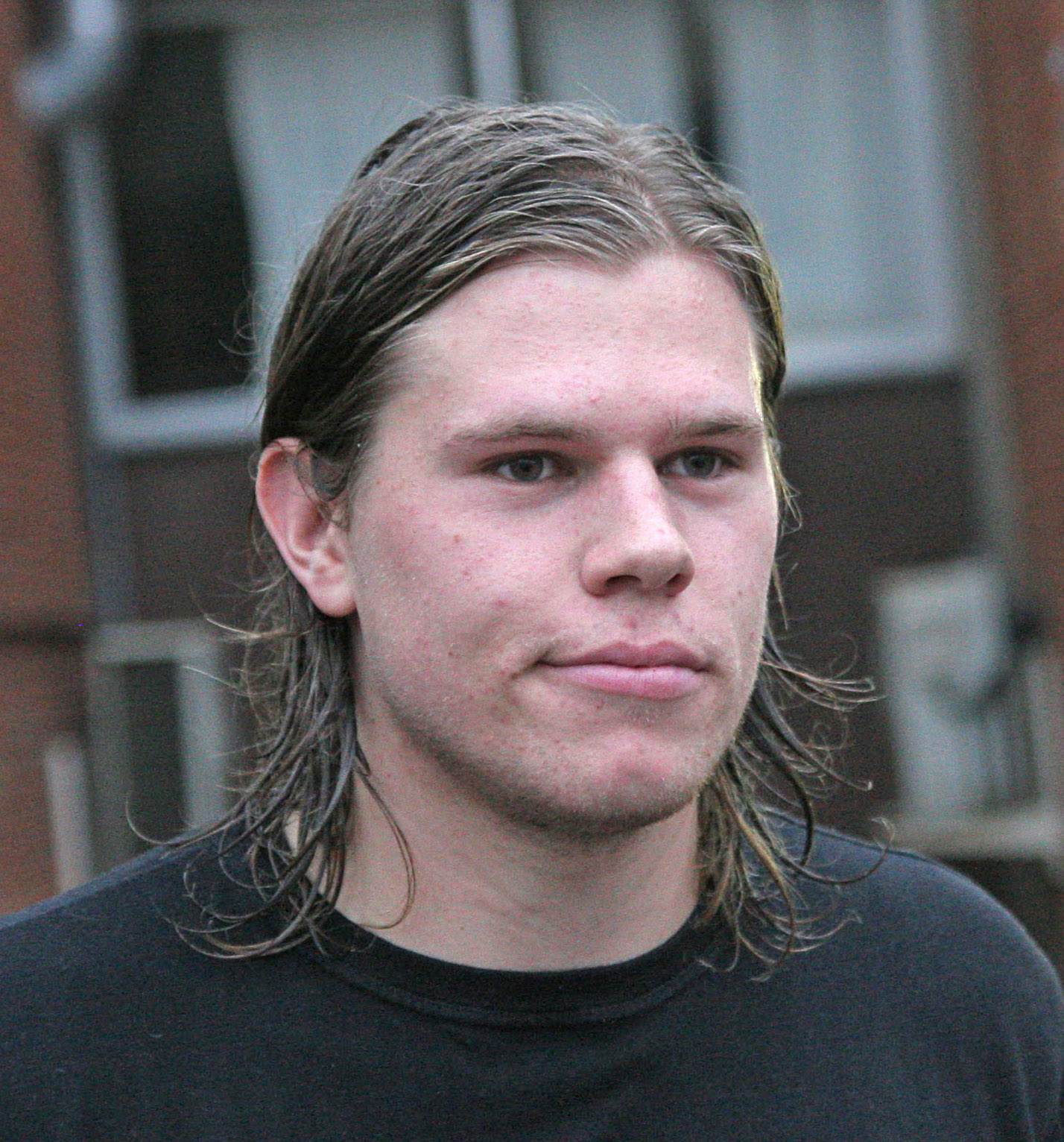
Hansen in 2008

He was voted as the IHF World Player of the Year in 2011, 2015 and 2018 by the International Handball Federation.

He joined FC Barcelona Handbol in June 2008. He previously played for Danish Handball League club GOG, with whom he won the Danish championship in 2007. On 2 June 2010, he returned to Denmark to play for AG København after two years of playing in Spain. After two years and two championships, the club folded in 2012 with Hansen joining the newly formed French team PSG Handball. He played for PSG for ten seasons before going back to Denmark and Aalborg Håndbold.

Mikkel Hansen is an Olympic Champion, a World Champion, and European Champion with the Danish national team, winning the 2016 title in Rio de Janeiro, the 2019 title in Denmark, and 2012 title in Serbia. He was also selected into the All-Star team of the tournament as the best left back. In 2011, he was a part of the Danish team that finished second in the World Championships in Sweden. He was the tournament's overall top goal scorer.

In 2019, he led Denmark to their first-ever World Championships win. He became the top scorer and MVP of the tournament. Later, that same year, he was named the best in the world for the third time of his career.

In 2021, he yet again won the World Championship with Denmark and was selected both as the best left back and as MVP.

In the 2020 Olympics, where Denmark got a silver medal, he was again chosen as the best left back, and he became the top goal scorer with 61 goals. With those 61 goals, he broke the record of most scored goals in one men's olympic handball tournament. During the tournament, he also became the number one goal scorer ever in the men's handball olympics, with a total of 165 goals.

In April 2024 Hansen announced his retirement from handball during the following summer

== Personal life ==
His father, Flemming Hansen, played for the Danish national handball team, where he played 120 national team matches, scored 240 goals, and participated in the 1984 Summer Olympics.

He married Stephanie Gundelach in 2020. The couple have two sons, Eddie Max born in January 2019, and Vince born in May 2021. The couple divorced in 2026.

== Individual awards ==
- IHF World Player of the Year – Men: 2011, 2015, 2018
- Handball-Planet – Best World Handball Player: 2016, 2019, 2021
- Most Valuable Player (MVP) of the Olympic Games: 2016
- Most Valuable Player (MVP) of the World Championship: 2013, 2019, 2021
- Most Valuable Player (MVP) of the LNH Division 1: 2016
- Top Goalscorer of the Olympic Games: 2020
- Top Goalscorer of the World Championship: 2011, 2019
- Top Goalscorer of the EHF Champions League: 2012, 2016
- Top Goalscorer of the LNH Division 1: 2015, 2016
- All-Star Left back of the Olympic Games: 2016, 2020
- All-Star Left back of the World Championship: 2011, 2021
- All-Star Left back of the European Championship: 2012, 2014, 2018, 2022
- All-Star Left back of the EHF Champions League: 2017, 2019, 2021
- All-Star Playmaker of the EHF Champions League: 2014, 2015, 2020
- His player number 24 becoming a retired number at Aalborg Håndbold
- Danish Handball Cup MVP 2011

== Major tournament statistics ==
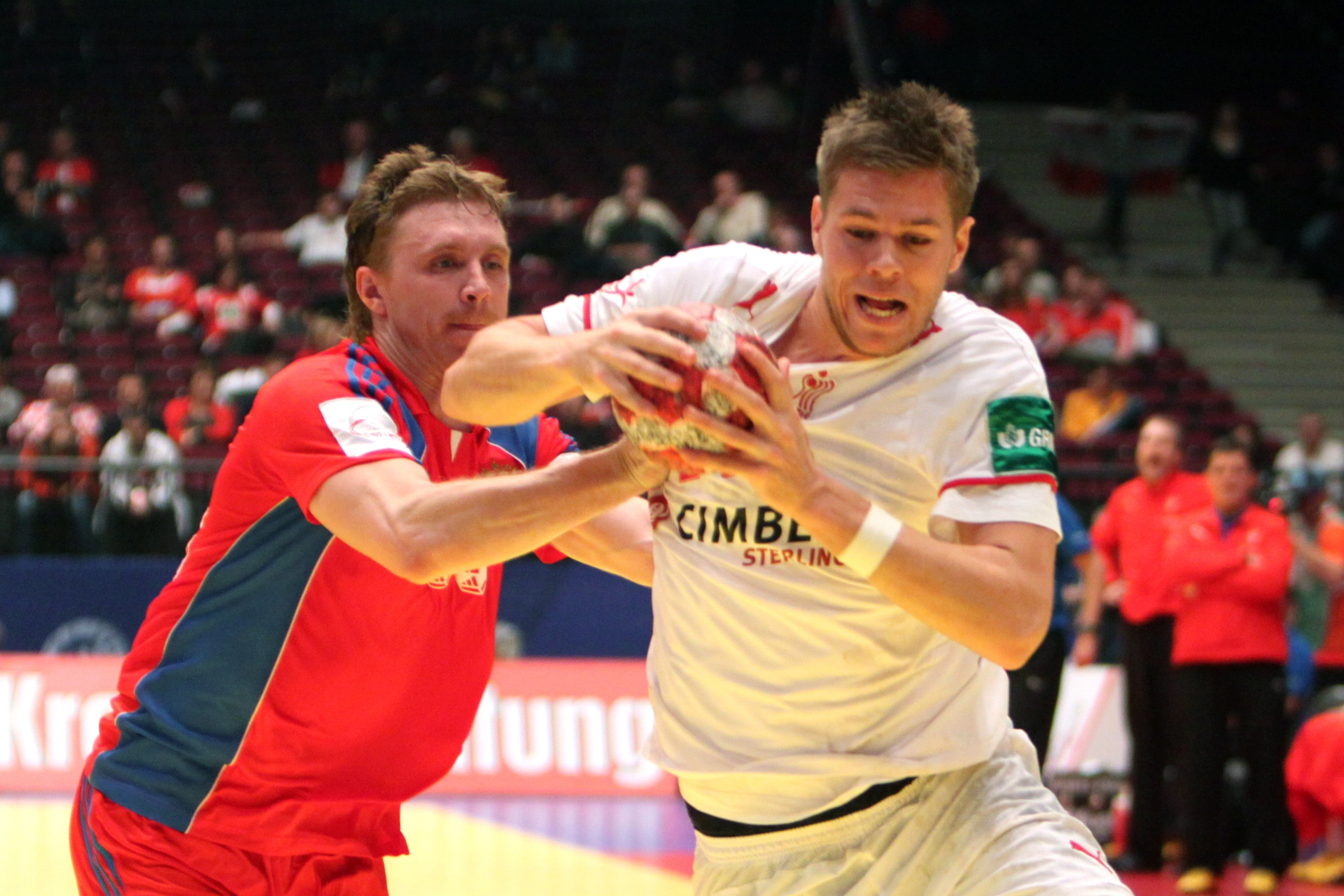
Hansen (right) playing for Denmark against Russia at the 2010 European Men's Handball Championship

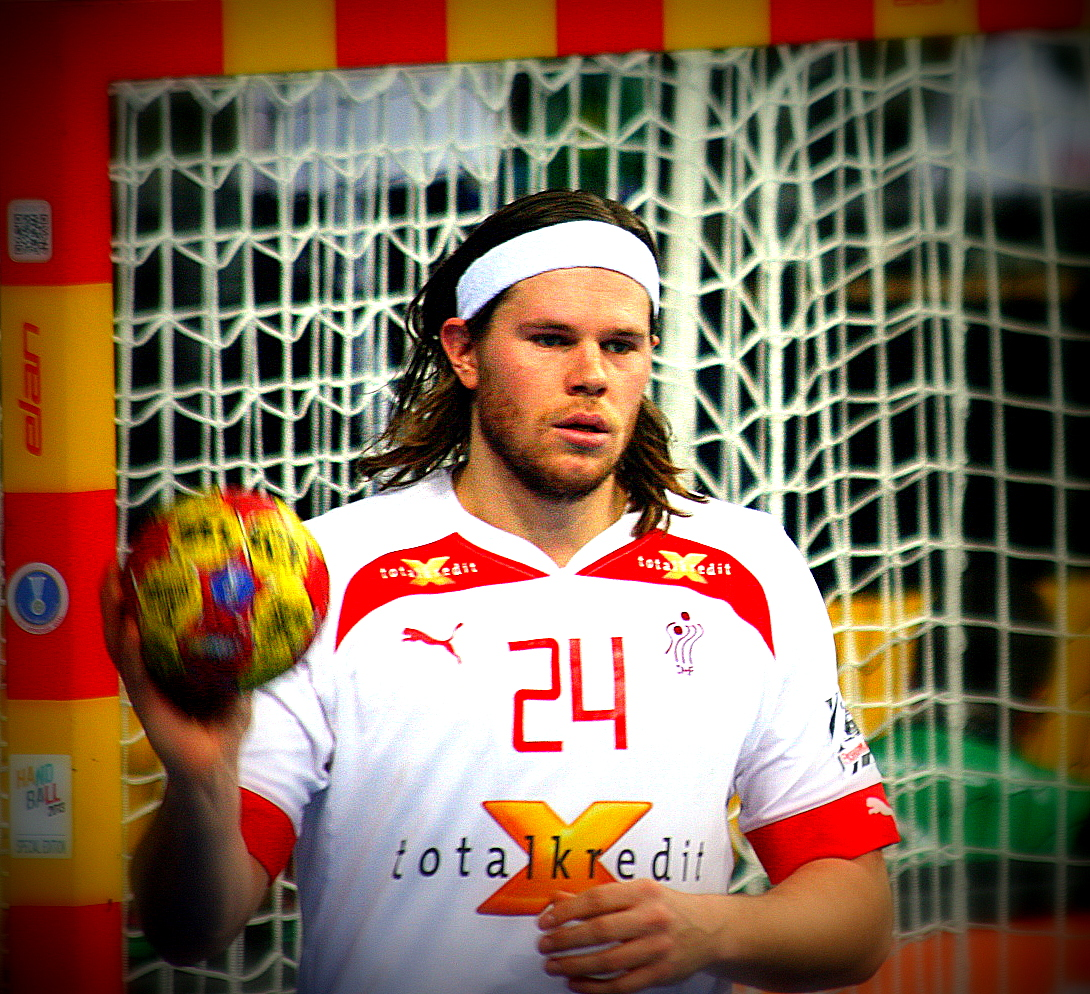
Hansen playing for Denmark at the 2013 World Men's Handball Championship

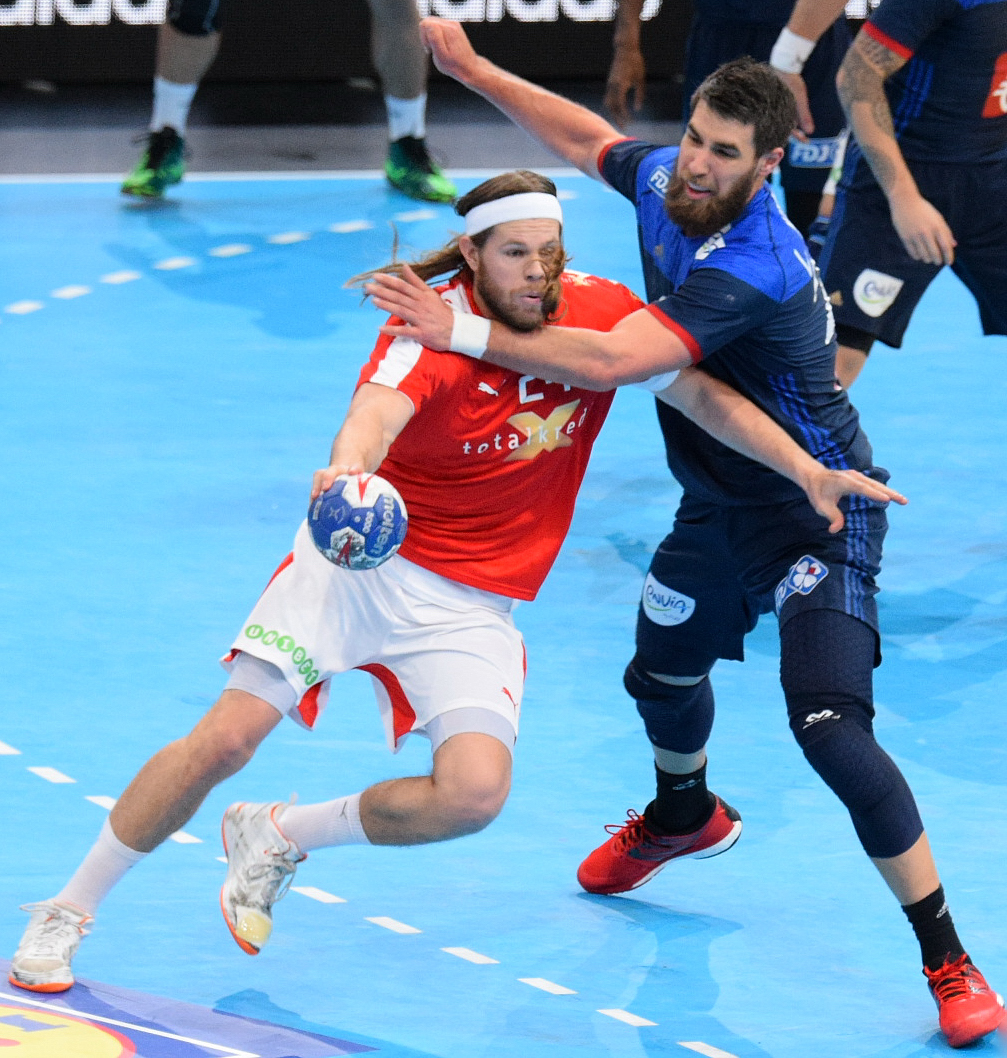
Hansen (left) playing for Denmark against France in 2016

Legend
Tnmt	Tournament	GP	Games played	Gls	Goals
Sh	Shots	G%	Goal percentage	7G	7-meter goals
7S	7-meter shots	As	Assists	AG	Assists and Goals
St	Steals	Bl	Blocks	2M	2 Minute Suspensions
RC	Red Cards	Pl	Placement of National Team	**Bold**	Career high
	Led the Tournament		Tournament MVP		On All-Star Team

As of conclusion of 2024 Summer Olympics - Men's Handball Tournament

Tnmt	GP	Gls	Sh	G%	7G	7S	As	AG	St	Bl	2M	RC	Pl
2008 OG	7	22	42	52	0	0	5	27	1	0	0	0	7th
2009 WC	8	40	69	58	6	7	29	69	1	1	2	0	4th
2010 EC	7	34	65	52	0	0	11	45	0	0	4	0	5th
2011 WC	**10**	68	**121**	56	0	0	34	102	5	**9**	5	0	2nd
2012 EC	8	45	89	51	0	0	30	75	4	2	1	0	1st
2012 OG	6	28	55	51	0	0	28	56	3	5	4	0	6th
2013 WC	7	22	49	44	0	0	20	42	**8**	2	2	0	2nd
2014 EC	8	39	60	65	0	0	**49**	88	1	4	2	0	2nd
2015 WC	9	39	67	58	0	0	**49**	88	2	3	**9**	0	5th
2016 EC	7	33	57	58	1	2	38	71	4	2	2	0	6th
2016 OG	8	54	87	62	15	17	23	77	1	1	1	0	1st
2017 WC	6	26	40	65	7	7	19	45	1	2	0	**1**	10th
2018 EC	8	43	79	54	13	16	24	67	3	1	6	**1**	4th
2019 WC	**10**	**72**	108	67	24	30	37	**109**	0	0	1	0	1st
2020 EC	3	19	29	66	6	7	13	32	0	0	1	0	13th
2021 WC	7	48	69	70	14	17	26	74	2	0	0	**1**	1st
2020 OG	8	61	100	61	**31**	**36**	31	92	2	1	0	0	2nd
2022 EC	7	48	69	70	24	29	26	74	1	0	1	0	3rd
2023 WC	9	41	60	68	18	25	36	77	0	1	1	0	1st
2024 EC	8	35	49	71	26	29	14	49	0	0	0	0	2nd
2024 OG	8	29	36	**81**	26	32	6	35	0	0	0	0	1st
EC Sum	56	296	497	60	70	83	205	501	13	9	17	1	1
WC Sum	66	356	583	61	69	86	250	606	19	18	20	2	3
OG Sum	37	194	320	61	72	85	93	287	7	7	5	0	2
**Total**	**159**	**846**	**1400**	**60**	**211**	**254**	**548**	**1394**	**39**	**34**	**42**	**3**	**6**

== Honours ==
=== Club ===
- French Championship:
  - Winners: 2013, 2015, 2016, 2017, 2018, 2019, 2020, 2021, 2022
  - Runners-up: 2014
- Coupe de France
  - Winners: 2013–14, 2014–15, 2017–18, 2020–21, 2021–22
  - Runners-up: 2012–13, 2015–16
- Coupe de la Ligue
  - Winners: 2015–16
- Trophée des Champions
  - Winners: 2014, 2015, 2016, 2019
  - Runners-up: 2017
- Danish Championship:
  - Winners: 2007, 2011, 2012, 2024
  - Runners-up: 2006, 2008, 2023
- Danish Cup:
  - Winners: 2005, 2010, 2011
  - Runners-up: 2007, 2008, 2023
- Danish Super Cup:
  - Winners: 2022
- Spanish Championship:
  - Runners-up: 2009, 2010
- ASOBAL Cup:
  - Winners: 2010
  - Runners-up: 2009
- Spanish Supercup:
  - Winners: 2009, 2010
- Spanish Cup:
  - Winners: 2009, 2010
- EHF Champions League
  - Runners-up: 2016–17, 2023–24
  - Third place: 2011–12, 2017–18, 2019–20
- IHF Super Globe
  - Runners-up: 2016

=== International ===
- Olympics:
  - Gold: 2016, 2024
  - Silver: 2020
- World championship:
  - Gold: 2019, 2021, 2023
  - Silver: 2011, 2013
- European championship:
  - Gold: 2012
  - Silver: 2014, 2024
  - Bronze: 2022

== International goals ==
No.	Date	Venue	Opponent	Result	Competition
1358.	27 July 2024	Paris, France	France	36–31	2024 Summer Olympics
1359.	27 July 2024	Paris, France	France	36–31	2024 Summer Olympics
1360.	27 July 2024	Paris, France	France	36–31	2024 Summer Olympics
1361.	27 July 2024	Paris, France	France	36–31	2024 Summer Olympics
1362.	27 July 2024	Paris, France	France	36–31	2024 Summer Olympics
1363.	27 July 2024	Paris, France	France	36–31	2024 Summer Olympics
1364.	29 July 2024	Paris, France	Egypt	30–27	2024 Summer Olympics
1365.	29 July 2024	Paris, France	Egypt	30–27	2024 Summer Olympics
1367.	31 July 2024	Paris, France	Argentina	38–27	2024 Summer Olympics
1368.	31 July 2024	Paris, France	Argentina	38–27	2024 Summer Olympics
1369.	2 August 2024	Paris, France	Hungary	28–25	2024 Summer Olympics
1370.	2 August 2024	Paris, France	Hungary	28–25	2024 Summer Olympics
1371.	2 August 2024	Paris, France	Hungary	28–25	2024 Summer Olympics
1372.	2 August 2024	Paris, France	Hungary	28–25	2024 Summer Olympics
1373.	2 August 2024	Paris, France	Hungary	28–25	2024 Summer Olympics
1374.	4 August 2024	Paris, France	Norway	32–25	2024 Summer Olympics
1375.	7 August 2024	Lille, France	Sweden	32–31	2024 Summer Olympics
1376.	7 August 2024	Lille, France	Sweden	32–31	2024 Summer Olympics
1377.	7 August 2024	Lille, France	Sweden	32–31	2024 Summer Olympics
1378.	7 August 2024	Lille, France	Sweden	32–31	2024 Summer Olympics
1379.	7 August 2024	Lille, France	Sweden	32–31	2024 Summer Olympics
1380.	7 August 2024	Lille, France	Sweden	32–31	2024 Summer Olympics
1381.	9 August 2024	Lille, France	Slovenia	31–30	2024 Summer Olympics
1382.	9 August 2024	Lille, France	Slovenia	31–30	2024 Summer Olympics
1383.	9 August 2024	Lille, France	Slovenia	31–30	2024 Summer Olympics
1384.	9 August 2024	Lille, France	Slovenia	31–30	2024 Summer Olympics
1385.	9 August 2024	Lille, France	Slovenia	31–30	2024 Summer Olympics
1386.	11 August 2024	Lille, France	Germany	39–26	2024 Summer Olympics
1387.	11 August 2024	Lille, France	Germany	39–26	2024 Summer Olympics

== See also ==
- List of men's handballers with 1000 or more international goals
