= Belarusian Men's Handball Championship - Season 2015/2016 =

The 2015/2016 season was the 24th season of the Belarusian Men's Handball Championship. HC Meshkov Brest were the defending champions. The season was held in 3 stages.

== First stage ==
Teams were divided into 2 groups:

- Group 1: SKA Minsk, GK Gomel, Kronon Grodno, Masheka Mogilev, GK im. Levin Novopolotsk
- Group 2: Meshkov Brest 2, RGUOR-SKA, RCOR, SKA-Suvorov

During this stage each team played the others: in Group 1 – 4 times, in Group 2 – 6 times. HC Meshkov Brest as defending champions of the 2014/2015 season skipped this stage.

=== Results ===
Group 1

Pos	Team	1	2	3	4	5	GD	P
1	SKA Minsk	X	29:29; 31:27; 34:26; 24:19	36:20; 34:22; 39:27; 38:26	34:26; 42:28; 37:28; 40:32	34:26; 41:33; 39:21; 45:29	577:419	31
2	GK Gomel	29:29; 27:31; 26:34; 19:24	X	29:30; 32:28; 33:31; 43:20	44:24; 24:21; 31:28; 33:19	28:25; 35:32; 31:23; 31:23	495:422	23
3	Kronon Grodno	20:36; 22:34; 27:39; 26:38	30:29; 28:32; 31:33; 20:43	X	28:36; 32:28; 32:31; 33:32	28:27; 35:32; 29:30; 34:25	455:525	14
4	GK im. Levin Novopolotsk	26:34; 28:42; 28:37; 32:40	24:44; 21:24; 28:31; 19:33	36:28; 28:32; 31:32; 32:33	X	31:24; 30:26; 33:30; 28:27	455:517	10
5	Masheka Mogilev	26:34; 33:41; 21:39; 29:45	25:28; 32:35; 23:31; 23:31	27:28; 32:35; 30:29; 25:34	24:31; 26:30; 30:33; 27:28	X	433:532	2

Group 2

Pos	Team	1	2	3	4	GD	P
1	Meshkov Brest 2	X	30:16; 35:25; 27:26; 29:22; 37:17; 32:24	36:25; 31:20; 31:24; 28:31; 32:26; 31:23	40:26; 34:25; 35:26; 33:23; 30:26; 34:25	585:430	34
2	RCOR	16:30; 25:35; 26:27; 22:29; 17:37; 24:32	X	31:23; 35:31; 34:30; 32:31; 35:38; 24:31	34:26; 37:28; 35:24; 27:30; 26:31; 15:38	495:551	14
3	RGUOR-SKA	25:36; 20:31; 24:31; 31:28; 26:32; 23:31	23:31; 31:35; 30:34; 31:32; 38:35; 31:24	X	33:34; 33:34; 34:28; 32:28; 23:22; 26:32	514:558	12
4	SKA-Suvorov	26:40; 25:34; 26:35; 23:33; 26:30; 25:34	26:34; 28:37; 24:35; 30:27; 31:26; 38:15	34:33; 34:33; 28:34; 28:32; 22:23; 32:26	X	506:561	12

== Second stage ==
According to the results of the first stage were formed 3 groups:

- Group A: HC Meshkov Brest, 1st, 2nd and 3rd places of Group 1
- Group B: rest teams of Group 1, 1st place of Group 2 and Belarus national handball U-18 team (on a non-competitive basis)
- Group C: rest teams of Group 2

At the end of the stage in Group B were determined the places from 5th to 7th in the championship, in the Group C – the places from 8th to 10th in the championship.

=== Results ===
Group A

Pos	Team	1	2	3	4	GD	P
1	Meshkov Brest	X	36:31; 34:26	36:27; 36:31	47:22; 38:22	227:159	12
2	SKA Minsk	31:36; 26:34	X	32:30; 35:30	49:27; 45:26	218:183	8
3	GK Gomel	27:36; 31:36	30:32; 30:35	X	37:27; 36:28	191:194	4
4	Kronon Grodno	22:47; 22:38	27:49; 26:45	27:37; 28:36	X	152:252	0

Group B

Pos	Team	1	2	3	4	GD	P
5	Masheka Mogilev	X	35:27; 27:25; 32:25	37:29; 33:26; 25:27	32:38; 34:26; 43:30	298:253	14
6	Meshkov Brest 2	27:35; 25:27; 25:32	X	30:23; 23:23; 36:32	30:29; 24:27; 32:25	252:253	9
-	National U-18 team	29:37; 26:33; 27:25	23:30; 23:23; 32:36	X	28:28; 33:32; 30:28	251:272	8
7	GK im. Levin Novopolotsk	38:32; 26:34; 30:43	29:30; 27:24; 25:32	28:28; 32:33; 28:32	X	263:288	5

Group C

Pos	Team	1	2	3	GD	P
8	SKA-Suvorov	X	26:34; 28:37; 24:35; 30:27; 31:26; 38:15; 32:29; 29:21; 34:24	34:33; 34:33; 28:34; 28:32; 22:23; 32:26; 40:26; 31:19; 23:31	544:505	22
9*	RCOR	34:26; 37:28; 35:24; 27:30; 26:31; 15:38; 29:32; 21:29; 24:34	X	31:23; 35:31; 34:30; 32:31; 35:38; 24:31; 25:29; 21:27; 33:30	518:542	16
10*	RGUOR-SKA	33:34; 33:34; 34:28; 32:28; 23:22; 26:32; 26:40; 19:31; 31:23	23:31; 31:35; 30:34; 31:32; 38:35; 31:24; 29:25; 27:21; 30:33	X	527:542	16

∗ RCOR scored more points in personal matches against RGUOR-SKA (10-8) and therefore stands above

== Third stage (Playoffs) ==
According to the final positions in Group A were formed semi-final pairs up as follows:

- 3rd place - 2nd place
- 4th place - 1st place

Winners of the semi-final pairs played in the final round, where competed for the gold and silver medals of the championship. Defeated in semi-finals teams competed for the bronze medals. The semi-finals were held up to two wins one of the teams, the final round - up to three wins.

=== Results ===
Semi-finals
GK Gomel	1
SKA Minsk	2
Kronon Grodno	0
Meshkov Brest	2

Final
SKA Minsk	0
Meshkov Brest	3
Third place
Kronon Grodno	0
GK Gomel	3

Semi-finals

26 April 2016
18:00 UTC+3

GK Gomel	38:37	SKA Minsk

GRCOR, Gomel
29 April 2016
20:00 UTC+3

SKA Minsk	28:25	GK Gomel

Sports Palace "Uruchje", Minsk
30 April 2016
12:00 UTC+3

SKA Minsk	31:27	GK Gomel

Sports Palace "Uruchje", Minsk

26 April 2016
15:30 UTC+3

Kronon Grodno	18:42	Meshkov Brest

Sports Complex "Victoria", Grodno
29 April 2016
18:00 UTC+3

Meshkov Brest	43:24	Kronon Grodno

Sports Palace "Victoria", Brest

Third place

18 May 2016
17:00 UTC+3

Kronon Grodno	24:40	GK Gomel

Sports Complex "Victoria", Grodno
21 May 2016
13:00 UTC+3

GK Gomel	34:31	Kronon Grodno

GRCOR, Gomel
22 May 2016
13:00 UTC+3

GK Gomel	31:26	Kronon Grodno

GRCOR, Gomel

Final

18 May 2016
19:30 UTC+3

SKA Minsk	30:32	Meshkov Brest

Sports Palace "Uruchje", Minsk
21 May 2016
16:00 UTC+3

Meshkov Brest	33:26	SKA Minsk

Sports Palace "Victoria", Brest
22 May 2016
18:30 UTC+3

Meshkov Brest	27:26	SKA Minsk

Sports Palace "Victoria", Brest

== Results of the season ==
Gold medal	Silver medal	Bronze medal
Meshkov Brest; 8th time	SKA Minsk; 9th time	GK Gomel; 4th time
