= 2016–17 EHF Champions League group stage =

Champions League

The 2016–17 EHF Champions League group stage began on 21 September 2016 and concluded on 12 March 2017. A total of 28 teams competed for 14 places in the knockout stage of the 2016–17 EHF Champions League.

== Draw ==
The draw for the group stage was held on 1 July 2016.

=== Seedings ===
The seedings were announced on 27 June 2016.

Seeding pots for Groups A and B
Pot 1	Pot 2	Pot 3	Pot 4
(Hungary) Telekom Veszprém (Germany) Rhein-Neckar Löwen	(Spain) Barcelona Lassa (Poland) Vive Tauron Kielce	(France) Paris Saint-Germain (North Macedonia) Vardar	(Croatia) Zagreb (Denmark) Bjerringbro-Silkeborg
Pot 5	Pot 6	Pot 7	Pot 8
(Belarus) Meshkov Brest (Poland) Wisła Płock	(Hungary) MOL-Pick Szeged (Germany) Flensburg-Handewitt	(Slovenia) Celje (Switzerland) Kadetten Schaffhausen	(Sweden) IFK Kristianstad (Germany) THW Kiel

Seeding pots for Groups C and D
Pot 1	Pot 2	Pot 3
(Spain) Logroño (France) HBC Nantes	(North Macedonia) Metalurg Skopje (Denmark) Team Tvis Holstebro	(Ukraine) Motor Zaporizhzhia (Russia) Chekhovskiye Medvedi
Pot 4	Pot 5	Pot 6
(Turkey) Beşiktaş (France) Montpellier	(Romania) Dinamo București (Norway) Elverum Håndball	(Slovakia) Tatran Prešov (Portugal) ABC/UMinho

^{†} Winners of the qualifying round whose identity was not known at the time of the draw.

== Format ==
In each group, teams played against each other in a double round-robin format, with home and away matches. After completion of the group stage matches, the teams advancing to the knockout stage were determined in the following manner:

- Groups A and B – the top team qualified directly for the quarter-finals, and the five teams ranked 2nd–6th advance to the first knockout round.
- Groups C and D – the top two teams from both groups contested a playoff to determine the last two sides joining the 10 teams from Groups A and B in the first knockout round.

=== Tiebreakers ===
In the group stage, teams were ranked according to points (2 points for a win, 1 point for a draw, 0 points for a loss). After completion of the group stage, if two or more teams have scored the same number of points, the ranking was determined as follows (article 4.3.1, section II of regulations):

1. Highest number of points in matches between the teams directly involved;
2. Superior goal difference in matches between the teams directly involved;
3. Highest number of goals scored in matches between the teams directly involved (or in the away match in case of a two-team tie);
4. Superior goal difference in all matches of the group;
5. Highest number of plus goals in all matches of the group;

If the ranking of one of these teams is determined, the above criteria are consecutively followed until the ranking of all teams is determined. If no ranking can be determined, a decision shall be obtained by EHF through drawing of lots.

During the group stage, only criteria 4–5 apply to determine the provisional ranking of teams.

== Groups ==
The matchdays were 21–25 September, 28 September–2 October, 5–9 October, 12–16 October, 19–23 October, 9–13 November, 16–20 November, 23–27 November, 30 November–4 December 2016 and 8–12 February 2017. For Groups A and B, additional matchdays include, 15–19 February, 22–26 February, 1–5 March and 8–12 March 2016.

=== Group A ===
Pos	Team	Pld	W	D	L	GF	GA	GD	Pts	Qualification
1	(Spain) Barcelona Lassa	14	12	1	1	413	354	+59	25	Quarterfinals
2	(France) Paris Saint-Germain	14	12	0	2	451	383	+68	24	First knockout round
3	(Hungary) Telekom Veszprém	14	8	2	4	381	365	+16	18	First knockout round
4	(Germany) Flensburg-Handewitt	14	7	1	6	382	366	+16	15	First knockout round
5	(Germany) THW Kiel	14	5	2	7	353	376	−23	12	First knockout round
6	(Denmark) Bjerringbro-Silkeborg	14	4	0	10	364	396	−32	8 (Note: Bjerringbro-Silkeborg 58–52 Wisła Płock)	First knockout round
7	(Poland) Wisła Płock	14	3	2	9	367	401	−34	8	
8	(Switzerland) Kadetten Schaffhausen	14	1	0	13	370	440	−70	2	

Source: EHF
Rules for classification: See Tiebreakers
Notes:

22 September 2016; 20:00	Kadetten Schaffhausen (Switzerland)	24–25	(Denmark) Bjerringbro-Silkeborg	BBC-Arena, Schaffhausen; Attendance: 2,150; Referees: Pavićević, Ražnatović (MNE)
22 September 2016; 20:00	Császár 11	(12–10)	Hansen 7	BBC-Arena, Schaffhausen; Attendance: 2,150; Referees: Pavićević, Ražnatović (MNE)
22 September 2016; 20:00	3× (yellow card) 6× (suspension)	Report	2× (yellow card) 6× (suspension)	BBC-Arena, Schaffhausen; Attendance: 2,150; Referees: Pavićević, Ražnatović (MNE)

24 September 2016; 17:30	Flensburg-Handewitt (Germany)	24–24	(Hungary) Telekom Veszprém	Flens-Arena, Flensburg; Attendance: 5,027; Referees: Elíasson, Pálsson (ISL)
24 September 2016; 17:30	Mahé 9	(10–13)	Ilić 7	Flens-Arena, Flensburg; Attendance: 5,027; Referees: Elíasson, Pálsson (ISL)
24 September 2016; 17:30	3× (yellow card) 4× (suspension)	Report	3× (yellow card) 7× (suspension)	Flens-Arena, Flensburg; Attendance: 5,027; Referees: Elíasson, Pálsson (ISL)

25 September 2016; 18:00	Wisła Płock (Poland)	23–28	(Spain) Barcelona Lassa	Orlen Arena, Płock; Attendance: 5,440; Referees: Gubica, Milošević (CRO)
25 September 2016; 18:00	Ivić, Zhinikov 4	(12–11)	Rivera 7	Orlen Arena, Płock; Attendance: 5,440; Referees: Gubica, Milošević (CRO)
25 September 2016; 18:00	3× (yellow card) 4× (suspension)	Report	2× (yellow card) 2× (suspension)	Orlen Arena, Płock; Attendance: 5,440; Referees: Gubica, Milošević (CRO)

25 September 2016; 19:30	THW Kiel (Germany)	28–27	(France) Paris Saint-Germain	Sparkassen-Arena, Kiel; Attendance: 10,450; Referees: Baďura, Ondogrecula (SVK)
25 September 2016; 19:30	Nilsson 5	(15–15)	Gensheimer 10	Sparkassen-Arena, Kiel; Attendance: 10,450; Referees: Baďura, Ondogrecula (SVK)
25 September 2016; 19:30	2× (yellow card) 5× (suspension)	Report	3× (yellow card) 5× (suspension)	Sparkassen-Arena, Kiel; Attendance: 10,450; Referees: Baďura, Ondogrecula (SVK)

1 October 2016; 17:30	Telekom Veszprém (Hungary)	32–28	(Switzerland) Kadetten Schaffhausen	Veszprém Aréna, Veszprém; Attendance: 5,100; Referees: Johansson, Kliko (SWE)
1 October 2016; 17:30	Ilić 7	(16–15)	Maros 7	Veszprém Aréna, Veszprém; Attendance: 5,100; Referees: Johansson, Kliko (SWE)
1 October 2016; 17:30	3× (yellow card) 6× (suspension)	Report	3× (yellow card) 5× (suspension)	Veszprém Aréna, Veszprém; Attendance: 5,100; Referees: Johansson, Kliko (SWE)

1 October 2016; 19:30	Barcelona Lassa (Spain)	26–25	(Germany) THW Kiel	Palau Blaugrana, Barcelona; Attendance: 3,500; Referees: Krstič, Ljubič (SLO)
1 October 2016; 19:30	Rivera 6	(10–13)	Duvnjak 7	Palau Blaugrana, Barcelona; Attendance: 3,500; Referees: Krstič, Ljubič (SLO)
1 October 2016; 19:30	3× (yellow card) 2× (suspension)	Report	2× (yellow card) 6× (suspension) 1× (red card)	Palau Blaugrana, Barcelona; Attendance: 3,500; Referees: Krstič, Ljubič (SLO)

2 October 2016; 16:50	Bjerringbro-Silkeborg (Denmark)	19–25	(Germany) Flensburg-Handewitt	Ceres Arena, Aarhus; Attendance: 4,042; Referees: Gousko, Repkin (BLR)
2 October 2016; 16:50	Markussen 5	(10–12)	Mogensen 5	Ceres Arena, Aarhus; Attendance: 4,042; Referees: Gousko, Repkin (BLR)
2 October 2016; 16:50	3× (yellow card) 4× (suspension)	Report	3× (yellow card) 2× (suspension)	Ceres Arena, Aarhus; Attendance: 4,042; Referees: Gousko, Repkin (BLR)

2 October 2016; 17:30	Paris Saint-Germain (France)	33–30	(Poland) Wisła Płock	Halle Georges Carpentier, Paris; Attendance: 2,000; Referees: Nikolov, Nachevski (MKD)
2 October 2016; 17:30	Remili 10	(15–15)	Duarte, Rocha 6	Halle Georges Carpentier, Paris; Attendance: 2,000; Referees: Nikolov, Nachevski (MKD)
2 October 2016; 17:30	3× (yellow card) 2× (suspension)	Report	3× (yellow card) 4× (suspension)	Halle Georges Carpentier, Paris; Attendance: 2,000; Referees: Nikolov, Nachevski (MKD)

5 October 2016; 18:30	Flensburg-Handewitt (Germany)	27–28	(Spain) Barcelona Lassa	Flens-Arena, Flensburg; Attendance: 5,627; Referees: Nikolić, Stojković (SRB)
5 October 2016; 18:30	Glandorf 6	(11–13)	Jallouz 8	Flens-Arena, Flensburg; Attendance: 5,627; Referees: Nikolić, Stojković (SRB)
5 October 2016; 18:30	3× (yellow card) 3× (suspension)	Report	3× (yellow card) 3× (suspension)	Flens-Arena, Flensburg; Attendance: 5,627; Referees: Nikolić, Stojković (SRB)

8 October 2016; 16:00	Wisła Płock (Poland)	28–28	(Hungary) Telekom Veszprém	Orlen Arena, Płock; Attendance: 5,350; Referees: Gjeding, Hansen (DEN)
8 October 2016; 16:00	Ivić 8	(13–14)	Pálmarsson 8	Orlen Arena, Płock; Attendance: 5,350; Referees: Gjeding, Hansen (DEN)
8 October 2016; 16:00	1× (yellow card) 7× (suspension)	Report	2× (yellow card) 5× (suspension)	Orlen Arena, Płock; Attendance: 5,350; Referees: Gjeding, Hansen (DEN)

8 October 2016; 16:30	Kadetten Schaffhausen (Switzerland)	25–35	(France) Paris Saint-Germain	BBC-Arena, Schaffhausen; Attendance: 3,500; Referees: Leandersson, Lindroos (FIN)
8 October 2016; 16:30	Szyba 6	(8–19)	Gensheimer 7	BBC-Arena, Schaffhausen; Attendance: 3,500; Referees: Leandersson, Lindroos (FIN)
8 October 2016; 16:30	3× (yellow card) 3× (suspension)	Report	3× (yellow card) 2× (suspension)	BBC-Arena, Schaffhausen; Attendance: 3,500; Referees: Leandersson, Lindroos (FIN)

9 October 2016; 16:50	Bjerringbro-Silkeborg (Denmark)	25–28	(Germany) THW Kiel	Silkeborg-Hallerne, Silkeborg; Attendance: 2,315; Referees: Gasmi, Gasmi (FRA)
9 October 2016; 16:50	Espersen, Hansen 6	(9–12)	Bilyk, Nilsson 7	Silkeborg-Hallerne, Silkeborg; Attendance: 2,315; Referees: Gasmi, Gasmi (FRA)
9 October 2016; 16:50	2× (yellow card) 2× (suspension)	Report	3× (yellow card) 5× (suspension)	Silkeborg-Hallerne, Silkeborg; Attendance: 2,315; Referees: Gasmi, Gasmi (FRA)

12 October 2016; 19:15	Barcelona Lassa (Spain)	38–25	(Switzerland) Kadetten Schaffhausen	Palau Blaugrana, Barcelona; Attendance: 2,847; Referees: Zotin, Volodkov (RUS)
12 October 2016; 19:15	Lazarov 7	(21–12)	Maros 8	Palau Blaugrana, Barcelona; Attendance: 2,847; Referees: Zotin, Volodkov (RUS)
12 October 2016; 19:15	3× (yellow card) 2× (suspension)	Report	3× (yellow card) 4× (suspension)	Palau Blaugrana, Barcelona; Attendance: 2,847; Referees: Zotin, Volodkov (RUS)

15 October 2016; 17:30	Telekom Veszprém (Hungary)	21–19	(Germany) THW Kiel	Veszprém Aréna, Veszprém; Attendance: 5,019; Referees: Horáček, Novotný (CZE)
15 October 2016; 17:30	Ancsin, Marguč 5	(13–10)	Vujin 7	Veszprém Aréna, Veszprém; Attendance: 5,019; Referees: Horáček, Novotný (CZE)
15 October 2016; 17:30	3× (yellow card) 6× (suspension)	Report	3× (yellow card) 5× (suspension)	Veszprém Aréna, Veszprém; Attendance: 5,019; Referees: Horáček, Novotný (CZE)

16 October 2016; 16:50	Bjerringbro-Silkeborg (Denmark)	33–24	(Poland) Wisła Płock	Silkeborg-Hallerne, Silkeborg; Attendance: 2,008; Referees: Konjičanin, Konjičanin (BIH)
16 October 2016; 16:50	Knudsen, Markussen 7	(18–14)	Duarte 6	Silkeborg-Hallerne, Silkeborg; Attendance: 2,008; Referees: Konjičanin, Konjičanin (BIH)
16 October 2016; 16:50	2× (yellow card) 4× (suspension)	Report	3× (yellow card) 6× (suspension)	Silkeborg-Hallerne, Silkeborg; Attendance: 2,008; Referees: Konjičanin, Konjičanin (BIH)

16 October 2016; 18:30	Paris Saint-Germain (France)	27–22	(Germany) Flensburg-Handewitt	Halle Georges Carpentier, Paris; Attendance: 2,200; Referees: Gubica, Milošević (CRO)
16 October 2016; 18:30	Gensheimer 7	(13–11)	Jakobsson 5	Halle Georges Carpentier, Paris; Attendance: 2,200; Referees: Gubica, Milošević (CRO)
16 October 2016; 18:30	1× (yellow card) 4× (suspension)	Report	2× (yellow card) 5× (suspension)	Halle Georges Carpentier, Paris; Attendance: 2,200; Referees: Gubica, Milošević (CRO)

19 October 2016; 18:30	Flensburg-Handewitt (Germany)	22–20	(Poland) Wisła Płock	Flens-Arena, Flensburg; Attendance: 5,077; Referees: Krstič, Ljubič (SLO)
19 October 2016; 18:30	Wanne 5	(9–10)	Mihić 6	Flens-Arena, Flensburg; Attendance: 5,077; Referees: Krstič, Ljubič (SLO)
19 October 2016; 18:30	2× (yellow card) 3× (suspension)	Report	2× (yellow card) 5× (suspension)	Flens-Arena, Flensburg; Attendance: 5,077; Referees: Krstič, Ljubič (SLO)

22 October 2016; 17:30	THW Kiel (Germany)	32–29	(Switzerland) Kadetten Schaffhausen	Sparkassen-Arena, Kiel; Attendance: 9,846; Referees: Nikolov, Nachevski (MKD)
22 October 2016; 17:30	Duvnjak 6	(19–15)	Császár, Maros 8	Sparkassen-Arena, Kiel; Attendance: 9,846; Referees: Nikolov, Nachevski (MKD)
22 October 2016; 17:30	3× (yellow card) 1× (suspension)	Report	3× (yellow card) 4× (suspension)	Sparkassen-Arena, Kiel; Attendance: 9,846; Referees: Nikolov, Nachevski (MKD)

22 October 2016; 19:15	Barcelona Lassa (Spain)	26–23	(Hungary) Telekom Veszprém	Palau Blaugrana, Barcelona; Attendance: 4,948; Referees: Sondors, Līcis (LAT)
22 October 2016; 19:15	Jallouz 7	(16–11)	Gajić 5	Palau Blaugrana, Barcelona; Attendance: 4,948; Referees: Sondors, Līcis (LAT)
22 October 2016; 19:15	3× (yellow card) 3× (suspension)	Report	2× (yellow card) 5× (suspension)	Palau Blaugrana, Barcelona; Attendance: 4,948; Referees: Sondors, Līcis (LAT)

23 October 2016; 16:50	Bjerringbro-Silkeborg (Denmark)	30–36	(France) Paris Saint-Germain	Jyske Bank Boxen, Herning; Attendance: 10,204; Referees: Nikolić, Stojković (SRB)
23 October 2016; 16:50	Markussen 6	(16–19)	Karabatić 9	Jyske Bank Boxen, Herning; Attendance: 10,204; Referees: Nikolić, Stojković (SRB)
23 October 2016; 16:50	3× (yellow card) 5× (suspension)	Report	3× (yellow card) 4× (suspension)	Jyske Bank Boxen, Herning; Attendance: 10,204; Referees: Nikolić, Stojković (SRB)

9 November 2016; 18:30	Wisła Płock (Poland)	24–22	(Germany) THW Kiel	Orlen Arena, Płock; Attendance: 4,800; Referees: Nikolić, Stojković (SRB)
9 November 2016; 18:30	Ivić 6	(12–13)	Vujin 6	Orlen Arena, Płock; Attendance: 4,800; Referees: Nikolić, Stojković (SRB)
9 November 2016; 18:30	3× (yellow card) 3× (suspension)	Report	3× (yellow card) 2× (suspension)	Orlen Arena, Płock; Attendance: 4,800; Referees: Nikolić, Stojković (SRB)

10 November 2016; 20:30	Kadetten Schaffhausen (Switzerland)	26–29	(Germany) Flensburg-Handewitt	BBC-Arena, Schaffhausen; Attendance: 3,500; Referees: Caçador, Nicolau (POR)
10 November 2016; 20:30	Császár 8	(13–15)	Glandorf, Svan 5	BBC-Arena, Schaffhausen; Attendance: 3,500; Referees: Caçador, Nicolau (POR)
10 November 2016; 20:30	3× (yellow card) 1× (suspension)	Report	2× (yellow card) 1× (suspension)	BBC-Arena, Schaffhausen; Attendance: 3,500; Referees: Caçador, Nicolau (POR)

12 November 2016; 17:00	Telekom Veszprém (Hungary)	30–29	(Denmark) Bjerringbro-Silkeborg	Veszprém Aréna, Veszprém; Attendance: 5,019; Referees: Brkic, Jusufhodzic (AUT)
12 November 2016; 17:00	Ilić 8	(17–13)	Hundstrup 6	Veszprém Aréna, Veszprém; Attendance: 5,019; Referees: Brkic, Jusufhodzic (AUT)
12 November 2016; 17:00	3× (yellow card) 4× (suspension)	Report	3× (yellow card) 4× (suspension)	Veszprém Aréna, Veszprém; Attendance: 5,019; Referees: Brkic, Jusufhodzic (AUT)

12 November 2016; 18:30	Paris Saint-Germain (France)	33–26	(Spain) Barcelona Lassa	Halle Georges Carpentier, Paris; Attendance: 2,800; Referees: Gousko, Repkin (BLR)
12 November 2016; 18:30	Remili 9	(14–11)	Mem 5	Halle Georges Carpentier, Paris; Attendance: 2,800; Referees: Gousko, Repkin (BLR)
12 November 2016; 18:30	2× (yellow card) 3× (suspension)	Report	3× (yellow card) 1× (suspension)	Halle Georges Carpentier, Paris; Attendance: 2,800; Referees: Gousko, Repkin (BLR)

17 November 2016; 19:00	Wisła Płock (Poland)	33–26	(Switzerland) Kadetten Schaffhausen	Orlen Arena, Płock; Attendance: 4,532; Referees: Covalciuc, Covalciuc (MDA)
17 November 2016; 19:00	Ghionea 6	(15–12)	Császár 7	Orlen Arena, Płock; Attendance: 4,532; Referees: Covalciuc, Covalciuc (MDA)
17 November 2016; 19:00	2× (yellow card) 2× (suspension)	Report	3× (yellow card) 4× (suspension)	Orlen Arena, Płock; Attendance: 4,532; Referees: Covalciuc, Covalciuc (MDA)

20 November 2016; 16:50	Bjerringbro-Silkeborg (Denmark)	23–27	(Spain) Barcelona Lassa	Silkeborg-Hallerne, Silkeborg; Attendance: 2,425; Referees: Horáček, Novotný (CZE)
20 November 2016; 16:50	Espersen, Skube 5	(13–11)	Andersson, Lazarov 6	Silkeborg-Hallerne, Silkeborg; Attendance: 2,425; Referees: Horáček, Novotný (CZE)
20 November 2016; 16:50	2× (yellow card) 5× (suspension) 1× (red card)	Report	2× (yellow card) 5× (suspension)	Silkeborg-Hallerne, Silkeborg; Attendance: 2,425; Referees: Horáček, Novotný (CZE)

20 November 2016; 17:00	Telekom Veszprém (Hungary)	28–29	(France) Paris Saint-Germain	Veszprém Aréna, Veszprém; Attendance: 5,019; Referees: Krstič, Ljubič (SLO)
20 November 2016; 17:00	Ilić 8	(14–15)	Gensheimer 8	Veszprém Aréna, Veszprém; Attendance: 5,019; Referees: Krstič, Ljubič (SLO)
20 November 2016; 17:00	3× (yellow card) 5× (suspension)	Report	2× (yellow card) 6× (suspension)	Veszprém Aréna, Veszprém; Attendance: 5,019; Referees: Krstič, Ljubič (SLO)

20 November 2016; 19:30	THW Kiel (Germany)	22–30	(Germany) Flensburg-Handewitt	Sparkassen-Arena, Kiel; Attendance: 10,285; Referees: Sigurjónsson, Pétursson (ISL)
20 November 2016; 19:30	Weinhold, Zeitz 4	(12–14)	Eggert 6	Sparkassen-Arena, Kiel; Attendance: 10,285; Referees: Sigurjónsson, Pétursson (ISL)
20 November 2016; 19:30	3× (yellow card) 5× (suspension)	Report	3× (yellow card) 5× (suspension)	Sparkassen-Arena, Kiel; Attendance: 10,285; Referees: Sigurjónsson, Pétursson (ISL)

23 November 2016; 18:30	Flensburg-Handewitt (Germany)	25–26	(Germany) THW Kiel	Flens-Arena, Flensburg; Attendance: 6,300; Referees: Dinu, Din (ROU)
23 November 2016; 18:30	Eggert 7	(13–17)	three players 5	Flens-Arena, Flensburg; Attendance: 6,300; Referees: Dinu, Din (ROU)
23 November 2016; 18:30	3× (yellow card) 2× (suspension)	Report	3× (yellow card) 6× (suspension) 1× (red card)	Flens-Arena, Flensburg; Attendance: 6,300; Referees: Dinu, Din (ROU)

26 November 2016; 20:00	Kadetten Schaffhausen (Switzerland)	27–25	(Poland) Wisła Płock	BBC-Arena, Schaffhausen; Attendance: 2,400; Referees: Sondors, Līcis (LAT)
26 November 2016; 20:00	Császár 8	(12–14)	Zhitnikov 5	BBC-Arena, Schaffhausen; Attendance: 2,400; Referees: Sondors, Līcis (LAT)
26 November 2016; 20:00	2× (yellow card) 6× (suspension)	Report	3× (yellow card) 8× (suspension) 1× (red card)	BBC-Arena, Schaffhausen; Attendance: 2,400; Referees: Sondors, Līcis (LAT)

27 November 2016; 17:00	Paris Saint-Germain (France)	28–24	(Hungary) Telekom Veszprém	Halle Georges Carpentier, Paris; Attendance: 2,800; Referees: Baďura, Ondogrecula (SVK)
27 November 2016; 17:00	Gensheimer 6	(14–12)	Pálmarsson 5	Halle Georges Carpentier, Paris; Attendance: 2,800; Referees: Baďura, Ondogrecula (SVK)
27 November 2016; 17:00	3× (yellow card) 1× (suspension)	Report	2× (yellow card) 2× (suspension)	Halle Georges Carpentier, Paris; Attendance: 2,800; Referees: Baďura, Ondogrecula (SVK)

27 November 2016; 17:30	Barcelona Lassa (Spain)	34–19	(Denmark) Bjerringbro-Silkeborg	Palau Blaugrana, Barcelona; Attendance: 2,923; Referees: Caçador, Nicolau (POR)
27 November 2016; 17:30	Lazarov 7	(18–10)	Espersen 4	Palau Blaugrana, Barcelona; Attendance: 2,923; Referees: Caçador, Nicolau (POR)
27 November 2016; 17:30	3× (yellow card)	Report	3× (yellow card) 4× (suspension)	Palau Blaugrana, Barcelona; Attendance: 2,923; Referees: Caçador, Nicolau (POR)

3 December 2016; 17:30	THW Kiel (Germany)	24–24	(Poland) Wisła Płock	Sparkassen-Arena, Kiel; Attendance: 9,700; Referees: Gousko, Repkin (BLR)
3 December 2016; 17:30	Duvnjak 7	(15–9)	Mihić 6	Sparkassen-Arena, Kiel; Attendance: 9,700; Referees: Gousko, Repkin (BLR)
3 December 2016; 17:30	3× (yellow card) 2× (suspension)	Report	3× (yellow card) 1× (suspension)	Sparkassen-Arena, Kiel; Attendance: 9,700; Referees: Gousko, Repkin (BLR)

3 December 2016; 20:30	Barcelona Lassa (Spain)	35–32	(France) Paris Saint-Germain	Palau Blaugrana, Barcelona; Attendance: 6,110; Referees: Geipel, Helbig (GER)
3 December 2016; 20:30	Lazarov 9	(14–14)	Hansen 7	Palau Blaugrana, Barcelona; Attendance: 6,110; Referees: Geipel, Helbig (GER)
3 December 2016; 20:30	3× (yellow card) 4× (suspension)	Report	2× (yellow card) 5× (suspension)	Palau Blaugrana, Barcelona; Attendance: 6,110; Referees: Geipel, Helbig (GER)

4 December 2016; 16:50	Bjerringbro-Silkeborg (Denmark)	24–29	(Hungary) Telekom Veszprém	Silkeborg-Hallerne, Silkeborg; Attendance: 2,140; Referees: Nikolov, Nachevski (MKD)
4 December 2016; 16:50	Klitgaard, Skube 5	(9–15)	Ilić 6	Silkeborg-Hallerne, Silkeborg; Attendance: 2,140; Referees: Nikolov, Nachevski (MKD)
4 December 2016; 16:50	3× (yellow card) 3× (suspension)	Report	3× (yellow card) 6× (suspension)	Silkeborg-Hallerne, Silkeborg; Attendance: 2,140; Referees: Nikolov, Nachevski (MKD)

11 February 2017; 17:30	Telekom Veszprém (Hungary)	22–25	(Spain) Barcelona Lassa	Veszprém Aréna, Veszprém; Attendance: 5,019; Referees: Nikolić, Stojković (SRB)
11 February 2017; 17:30	Gajić, Nagy 6	(14–13)	Rivera Folch 5	Veszprém Aréna, Veszprém; Attendance: 5,019; Referees: Nikolić, Stojković (SRB)
11 February 2017; 17:30	3× (yellow card) 4× (suspension)	Report	3× (yellow card) 6× (suspension)	Veszprém Aréna, Veszprém; Attendance: 5,019; Referees: Nikolić, Stojković (SRB)

11 February 2017; 17:30	Kadetten Schaffhausen (Switzerland)	25–30	(Germany) THW Kiel	BBC-Arena, Schaffhausen; Attendance: 3,500; Referees: Krstič, Ljubič (SLO)
11 February 2017; 17:30	three players 5	(13–13)	Ekberg 8	BBC-Arena, Schaffhausen; Attendance: 3,500; Referees: Krstič, Ljubič (SLO)
11 February 2017; 17:30	2× (yellow card) 4× (suspension)	Report	3× (yellow card) 3× (suspension)	BBC-Arena, Schaffhausen; Attendance: 3,500; Referees: Krstič, Ljubič (SLO)

11 February 2017; 20:30	Paris Saint-Germain (France)	32–27	(Denmark) Bjerringbro-Silkeborg	Halle Georges Carpentier, Paris; Attendance: 3,400; Referees: Dinu, Din (ROU)
11 February 2017; 20:30	Karabatić 11	(18–13)	Nielsen 6	Halle Georges Carpentier, Paris; Attendance: 3,400; Referees: Dinu, Din (ROU)
11 February 2017; 20:30	3× (yellow card) 3× (suspension)	Report	3× (yellow card) 1× (suspension)	Halle Georges Carpentier, Paris; Attendance: 3,400; Referees: Dinu, Din (ROU)

12 February 2017; 17:30	Wisła Płock (Poland)	30–37	(Germany) Flensburg-Handewitt	Orlen Arena, Płock; Attendance: 4,500; Referees: Elíasson, Pálsson (ISL)
12 February 2017; 17:30	Ivić 6	(16–18)	Radivojević 9	Orlen Arena, Płock; Attendance: 4,500; Referees: Elíasson, Pálsson (ISL)
12 February 2017; 17:30	3× (yellow card) 4× (suspension)	Report	3× (yellow card) 6× (suspension)	Orlen Arena, Płock; Attendance: 4,500; Referees: Elíasson, Pálsson (ISL)

15 February 2017; 18:30	THW Kiel (Germany)	25–27	(Hungary) Telekom Veszprém	Sparkassen-Arena, Kiel; Attendance: 10,285; Referees: Gubica, Milošević (CRO)
15 February 2017; 18:30	Ekberg 7	(15–15)	Ilić 7	Sparkassen-Arena, Kiel; Attendance: 10,285; Referees: Gubica, Milošević (CRO)
15 February 2017; 18:30	3× (yellow card) 3× (suspension)	Report	3× (yellow card) 5× (suspension)	Sparkassen-Arena, Kiel; Attendance: 10,285; Referees: Gubica, Milošević (CRO)

16 February 2017; 20:00	Kadetten Schaffhausen (Switzerland)	24–31	(Spain) Barcelona Lassa	BBC-Arena, Schaffhausen; Attendance: 3,350; Referees: Jørum, Kleven (NOR)
16 February 2017; 20:00	Császár 7	(10–18)	N'Guessan 5	BBC-Arena, Schaffhausen; Attendance: 3,350; Referees: Jørum, Kleven (NOR)
16 February 2017; 20:00	2× (yellow card) 4× (suspension)	Report	2× (yellow card) 2× (suspension)	BBC-Arena, Schaffhausen; Attendance: 3,350; Referees: Jørum, Kleven (NOR)

18 February 2017; 16:00	Wisła Płock (Poland)	28–25	(Denmark) Bjerringbro-Silkeborg	Orlen Arena, Płock; Attendance: 4,360; Referees: Mitrović, Vešović (MNE)
18 February 2017; 16:00	Duarte 7	(13–15)	Knudsen 5	Orlen Arena, Płock; Attendance: 4,360; Referees: Mitrović, Vešović (MNE)
18 February 2017; 16:00	3× (yellow card) 4× (suspension) 1× (red card)	Report	2× (yellow card) 2× (suspension)	Orlen Arena, Płock; Attendance: 4,360; Referees: Mitrović, Vešović (MNE)

18 February 2017; 17:30	Flensburg-Handewitt (Germany)	33–34	(France) Paris Saint-Germain	Flens-Arena, Flensburg; Attendance: 6,300; Referees: Gjeding, Hansen (DEN)
18 February 2017; 17:30	Eggert, Schmidt 5	(18–15)	Nielsen 7	Flens-Arena, Flensburg; Attendance: 6,300; Referees: Gjeding, Hansen (DEN)
18 February 2017; 17:30	1× (yellow card) 2× (suspension)	Report	3× (yellow card) 2× (suspension)	Flens-Arena, Flensburg; Attendance: 6,300; Referees: Gjeding, Hansen (DEN)

25 February 2017; 17:00	Telekom Veszprém (Hungary)	31–25	(Poland) Wisła Płock	Veszprém Aréna, Veszprém; Attendance: 5,100; Referees: Mažeika, Gatelis (LTU)
25 February 2017; 17:00	Ilić 7	(18–14)	Ivić, Zhitnikov 4	Veszprém Aréna, Veszprém; Attendance: 5,100; Referees: Mažeika, Gatelis (LTU)
25 February 2017; 17:00	3× (yellow card) 6× (suspension)	Report	2× (yellow card) 4× (suspension)	Veszprém Aréna, Veszprém; Attendance: 5,100; Referees: Mažeika, Gatelis (LTU)

25 February 2017; 17:30	THW Kiel (Germany)	21–24	(Denmark) Bjerringbro-Silkeborg	Sparkassen-Arena, Kiel; Attendance: 10,285; Referees: Horáček, Novotný (CZE)
25 February 2017; 17:30	Duvnjak, Ekberg 4	(11–10)	Knudsen 7	Sparkassen-Arena, Kiel; Attendance: 10,285; Referees: Horáček, Novotný (CZE)
25 February 2017; 17:30	3× (yellow card) 3× (suspension)	Report	2× (yellow card) 1× (suspension)	Sparkassen-Arena, Kiel; Attendance: 10,285; Referees: Horáček, Novotný (CZE)

25 February 2017; 20:00	Paris Saint-Germain (France)	34–26	(Switzerland) Kadetten Schaffhausen	Halle Georges Carpentier, Paris; Attendance: 2,800; Referees: Kiyashko, Kiselev (RUS)
25 February 2017; 20:00	Gensheimer, Hansen 6	(17–16)	Császár 10	Halle Georges Carpentier, Paris; Attendance: 2,800; Referees: Kiyashko, Kiselev (RUS)
25 February 2017; 20:00	3× (yellow card) 4× (suspension)	Report	3× (yellow card) 4× (suspension)	Halle Georges Carpentier, Paris; Attendance: 2,800; Referees: Kiyashko, Kiselev (RUS)

26 February 2017; 19:30	Barcelona Lassa (Spain)	26–23	(Germany) Flensburg-Handewitt	Palau Blaugrana, Barcelona; Attendance: 4,107; Referees: Nikolov, Nachevski (MKD)
26 February 2017; 19:30	Rivera Folch 4	(14–12)	Radivojević 6	Palau Blaugrana, Barcelona; Attendance: 4,107; Referees: Nikolov, Nachevski (MKD)
26 February 2017; 19:30	3× (yellow card) 3× (suspension)	Report	3× (yellow card) 2× (suspension)	Palau Blaugrana, Barcelona; Attendance: 4,107; Referees: Nikolov, Nachevski (MKD)

2 March 2017; 20:00	Kadetten Schaffhausen (Switzerland)	27–28	(Hungary) Telekom Veszprém	BBC-Arena, Schaffhausen; Attendance: 2,860; Referees: Konjičanin, Konjičanin (BIH)
2 March 2017; 20:00	Maros 8	(15–16)	Gajić, Ilić 5	BBC-Arena, Schaffhausen; Attendance: 2,860; Referees: Konjičanin, Konjičanin (BIH)
2 March 2017; 20:00	1× (yellow card) 5× (suspension)	Report	2× (yellow card) 2× (suspension)	BBC-Arena, Schaffhausen; Attendance: 2,860; Referees: Konjičanin, Konjičanin (BIH)

4 March 2017; 17:30	Flensburg-Handewitt (Germany)	26–24	(Denmark) Bjerringbro-Silkeborg	Flens-Arena, Flensburg; Attendance: 5,867; Referees: Lah, Sok (SLO)
4 March 2017; 17:30	three players 5	(10–11)	Nielsen 7	Flens-Arena, Flensburg; Attendance: 5,867; Referees: Lah, Sok (SLO)
4 March 2017; 17:30	3× (yellow card) 2× (suspension)	Report	3× (yellow card) 4× (suspension)	Flens-Arena, Flensburg; Attendance: 5,867; Referees: Lah, Sok (SLO)

5 March 2017; 18:00	Wisła Płock (Poland)	25–29	(France) Paris Saint-Germain	Orlen Arena, Płock; Attendance: 5,287; Referees: Krstič, Ljubič (SLO)
5 March 2017; 18:00	Ivić 6	(11–14)	Gensheimer 7	Orlen Arena, Płock; Attendance: 5,287; Referees: Krstič, Ljubič (SLO)
5 March 2017; 18:00	3× (yellow card) 5× (suspension)	Report	3× (yellow card) 3× (suspension)	Orlen Arena, Płock; Attendance: 5,287; Referees: Krstič, Ljubič (SLO)

5 March 2017; 19:45	THW Kiel (Germany)	27–27	(Spain) Barcelona Lassa	Sparkassen-Arena, Kiel; Attendance: 10,049; Referees: Elíasson, Pálsson (ISL)
5 March 2017; 19:45	Ekberg, Vujin 8	(13–15)	Lazarov 8	Sparkassen-Arena, Kiel; Attendance: 10,049; Referees: Elíasson, Pálsson (ISL)
5 March 2017; 19:45	3× (yellow card) 4× (suspension)	Report	3× (yellow card) 6× (suspension)	Sparkassen-Arena, Kiel; Attendance: 10,049; Referees: Elíasson, Pálsson (ISL)

8 March 2017; 18:30	Flensburg-Handewitt (Germany)	31–26	(Switzerland) Kadetten Schaffhausen	Flens-Arena, Flensburg; Attendance: 5,567; Referees: Leszczynski, Piechota (POL)
8 March 2017; 18:30	Radivojević 7	(15–14)	Pendic 9	Flens-Arena, Flensburg; Attendance: 5,567; Referees: Leszczynski, Piechota (POL)
8 March 2017; 18:30	3× (yellow card) 3× (suspension)	Report	3× (yellow card) 5× (suspension)	Flens-Arena, Flensburg; Attendance: 5,567; Referees: Leszczynski, Piechota (POL)

11 March 2017; 17:30	Telekom Veszprém (Hungary)	34–28	(Germany) Flensburg-Handewitt	Veszprém Aréna, Veszprém; Attendance: 5,019; Referees: Baďura, Ondogrecula (SVK)
11 March 2017; 17:30	Ilić 9	(17–18)	Glandorf, Lauge 5	Veszprém Aréna, Veszprém; Attendance: 5,019; Referees: Baďura, Ondogrecula (SVK)
11 March 2017; 17:30	3× (yellow card) 4× (suspension) 1× (red card)	Report	2× (yellow card) 6× (suspension)	Veszprém Aréna, Veszprém; Attendance: 5,019; Referees: Baďura, Ondogrecula (SVK)

11 March 2017; 20:00	Barcelona Lassa (Spain)	36–28	(Poland) Wisła Płock	Palau Blaugrana, Barcelona; Attendance: 3,855; Referees: Baumgart, Wild (GER)
11 March 2017; 20:00	Tomás 7	(17–15)	Ivić 7	Palau Blaugrana, Barcelona; Attendance: 3,855; Referees: Baumgart, Wild (GER)
11 March 2017; 20:00	3× (yellow card) 3× (suspension)	Report	3× (yellow card) 5× (suspension)	Palau Blaugrana, Barcelona; Attendance: 3,855; Referees: Baumgart, Wild (GER)

12 March 2017; 16:50	Bjerringbro-Silkeborg (Denmark)	37–32	(Switzerland) Kadetten Schaffhausen	Silkeborg-Hallerne, Silkeborg; Attendance: 2,424; Referees: Horváth, Marton (HUN)
12 March 2017; 16:50	three players 7	(18–14)	three players 6	Silkeborg-Hallerne, Silkeborg; Attendance: 2,424; Referees: Horváth, Marton (HUN)
12 March 2017; 16:50	3× (yellow card) 3× (suspension)	Report	2× (yellow card) 7× (suspension) 1× (red card)	Silkeborg-Hallerne, Silkeborg; Attendance: 2,424; Referees: Horváth, Marton (HUN)

12 March 2017; 17:00	Paris Saint-Germain (France)	42–24	(Germany) THW Kiel	Halle Georges Carpentier, Paris; Attendance: 2,700; Referees: Zotin, Volodkov (RUS)
12 March 2017; 17:00	Gensheimer, Karabatić 7	(22–10)	Vujin 5	Halle Georges Carpentier, Paris; Attendance: 2,700; Referees: Zotin, Volodkov (RUS)
12 March 2017; 17:00	3× (yellow card) 3× (suspension)	Report	2× (yellow card) 3× (suspension)	Halle Georges Carpentier, Paris; Attendance: 2,700; Referees: Zotin, Volodkov (RUS)

=== Group B ===
Pos	Team	Pld	W	D	L	GF	GA	GD	Pts	Qualification
1	(North Macedonia) Vardar	14	10	0	4	412	378	+34	20	Quarterfinals
2	(Poland) Vive Tauron Kielce	14	9	0	5	415	390	+25	18	First knockout round
3	(Hungary) MOL-Pick Szeged	14	8	1	5	376	350	+26	17 (Note: MOL-Pick Szeged 58–52 Rhein-Neckar Löwen)	First knockout round
4	(Germany) Rhein-Neckar Löwen	14	8	1	5	392	396	−4	17	First knockout round
5	(Belarus) Meshkov Brest	14	5	4	5	383	385	−2	14	First knockout round
6	(Croatia) Zagreb	14	4	1	9	332	356	−24	9 (Note: Zagreb 51–51 Celje, Zagreb advanced on away goals.)	First knockout round
7	(Slovenia) Celje	14	3	3	8	399	424	−25	9	
8	(Sweden) IFK Kristianstad	14	3	2	9	381	411	−30	8	

Source: EHF
Rules for classification: See Tiebreakers
Notes:

24 September 2016; 17:00	Meshkov Brest (Belarus)	24–29	(Poland) Vive Tauron Kielce	Universal Sports Complex Victoria, Brest; Attendance: 3,220; Referees: Dobrovits, Tájok (HUN)
24 September 2016; 17:00	Stojković 6	(14–11)	Lijewski 6	Universal Sports Complex Victoria, Brest; Attendance: 3,220; Referees: Dobrovits, Tájok (HUN)
24 September 2016; 17:00	2× (yellow card) 4× (suspension)	Report	2× (yellow card) 6× (suspension)	Universal Sports Complex Victoria, Brest; Attendance: 3,220; Referees: Dobrovits, Tájok (HUN)

24 September 2016; 18:30	Celje (Slovenia)	30–28	(Croatia) Zagreb	Zlatorog Arena, Celje; Attendance: 3,000; Referees: López, Ramírez (ESP)
24 September 2016; 18:30	Žvižej 7	(14–13)	Mandalinić 10	Zlatorog Arena, Celje; Attendance: 3,000; Referees: López, Ramírez (ESP)
24 September 2016; 18:30	2× (yellow card) 7× (suspension) 1× (red card)	Report	3× (yellow card) 4× (suspension)	Zlatorog Arena, Celje; Attendance: 3,000; Referees: López, Ramírez (ESP)

25 September 2016; 16:15	IFK Kristianstad (Sweden)	23–28	(North Macedonia) Vardar	Kristianstad Arena, Kristianstad; Attendance: 3,966; Referees: Pichon, Reveret (FRA)
25 September 2016; 16:15	Henningsson 7	(12–15)	Dujshebaev 7	Kristianstad Arena, Kristianstad; Attendance: 3,966; Referees: Pichon, Reveret (FRA)
25 September 2016; 16:15	3× (yellow card) 3× (suspension)	Report	3× (yellow card) 3× (suspension)	Kristianstad Arena, Kristianstad; Attendance: 3,966; Referees: Pichon, Reveret (FRA)

25 September 2016; 17:00	MOL-Pick Szeged (Hungary)	28–28	(Germany) Rhein-Neckar Löwen	Városi Sportcsarnok, Szeged; Attendance: 3,100; Referees: Jurinović, Mrvica (CRO)
25 September 2016; 17:00	Gorbok 6	(13–12)	Schmid 6	Városi Sportcsarnok, Szeged; Attendance: 3,100; Referees: Jurinović, Mrvica (CRO)
25 September 2016; 17:00	3× (yellow card) 1× (suspension)	Report	2× (yellow card) 3× (suspension)	Városi Sportcsarnok, Szeged; Attendance: 3,100; Referees: Jurinović, Mrvica (CRO)

28 September 2016; 18:30	Rhein-Neckar Löwen (Germany)	31–30	(Slovenia) Celje	Fraport Arena, Frankfurt; Attendance: 1,270; Referees: Dinu, Din (ROU)
28 September 2016; 18:30	Ekdahl du Rietz, Pekeler 5	(16–15)	Zarabec 8	Fraport Arena, Frankfurt; Attendance: 1,270; Referees: Dinu, Din (ROU)
28 September 2016; 18:30	2× (yellow card) 5× (suspension)	Report	3× (yellow card) 1× (suspension)	Fraport Arena, Frankfurt; Attendance: 1,270; Referees: Dinu, Din (ROU)

1 October 2016; 15:30	Vive Tauron Kielce (Poland)	38–28	(Sweden) IFK Kristianstad	Hala Legionów, Kielce; Attendance: 3,800; Referees: Geipel, Helbig (GER)
1 October 2016; 15:30	Bielecki, Paczkowski 7	(18–13)	Henningsson 6	Hala Legionów, Kielce; Attendance: 3,800; Referees: Geipel, Helbig (GER)
1 October 2016; 15:30	3× (yellow card) 3× (suspension)	Report	2× (yellow card) 5× (suspension)	Hala Legionów, Kielce; Attendance: 3,800; Referees: Geipel, Helbig (GER)

1 October 2016; 17:30	Vardar (North Macedonia)	31–27	(Belarus) Meshkov Brest	Jane Sandanski Arena, Skopje; Attendance: 4,500; Referees: Mažeika, Gatelis (LTU)
1 October 2016; 17:30	Dujshebaev 9	(13–13)	Stojković 8	Jane Sandanski Arena, Skopje; Attendance: 4,500; Referees: Mažeika, Gatelis (LTU)
1 October 2016; 17:30	2× (yellow card) 3× (suspension)	Report	3× (yellow card) 6× (suspension) 1× (red card)	Jane Sandanski Arena, Skopje; Attendance: 4,500; Referees: Mažeika, Gatelis (LTU)

1 October 2016; 20:00	Zagreb (Croatia)	24–26	(Hungary) MOL-Pick Szeged	Arena Zagreb, Zagreb; Attendance: 6,000; Referees: Sondors, Līcis (LAT)
1 October 2016; 20:00	Horvat 6	(12–12)	Šoštarič 6	Arena Zagreb, Zagreb; Attendance: 6,000; Referees: Sondors, Līcis (LAT)
1 October 2016; 20:00	3× (yellow card) 4× (suspension)	Report	2× (yellow card) 7× (suspension)	Arena Zagreb, Zagreb; Attendance: 6,000; Referees: Sondors, Līcis (LAT)

8 October 2016; 18:15	IFK Kristianstad (Sweden)	29–22	(Croatia) Zagreb	Kristianstad Arena, Kristianstad; Attendance: 4,057; Referees: Kiyashko, Kiselev (RUS)
8 October 2016; 18:15	Lagergren 9	(13–10)	Mandalinić 5	Kristianstad Arena, Kristianstad; Attendance: 4,057; Referees: Kiyashko, Kiselev (RUS)
8 October 2016; 18:15	2× (yellow card) 4× (suspension)	Report	2× (yellow card) 4× (suspension)	Kristianstad Arena, Kristianstad; Attendance: 4,057; Referees: Kiyashko, Kiselev (RUS)

8 October 2016; 18:30	Meshkov Brest (Belarus)	30–28	(Germany) Rhein-Neckar Löwen	Universal Sports Complex Victoria, Brest; Attendance: 3,250; Referees: Opava, Válek (CZE)
8 October 2016; 18:30	Krištopāns 7	(17–12)	Ekdahl du Rietz 11	Universal Sports Complex Victoria, Brest; Attendance: 3,250; Referees: Opava, Válek (CZE)
8 October 2016; 18:30	3× (yellow card) 3× (suspension)	Report	2× (yellow card) 1× (suspension)	Universal Sports Complex Victoria, Brest; Attendance: 3,250; Referees: Opava, Válek (CZE)

9 October 2016; 17:00	MOL-Pick Szeged (Hungary)	27–29	(Poland) Vive Tauron Kielce	Városi Sportcsarnok, Szeged; Attendance: 3,200; Referees: Santos, Fonseca (POR)
9 October 2016; 17:00	Balogh 5	(15–16)	Lijewski 6	Városi Sportcsarnok, Szeged; Attendance: 3,200; Referees: Santos, Fonseca (POR)
9 October 2016; 17:00	2× (yellow card) 5× (suspension)	Report	3× (yellow card) 3× (suspension) 1× (red card)	Városi Sportcsarnok, Szeged; Attendance: 3,200; Referees: Santos, Fonseca (POR)

9 October 2016; 18:30	Celje (Slovenia)	26–32	(North Macedonia) Vardar	Zlatorog Arena, Celje; Attendance: 3,200; Referees: Madsen, Mortensen (DEN)
9 October 2016; 18:30	Mlakar, Poteko 5	(15–15)	Marsenić 6	Zlatorog Arena, Celje; Attendance: 3,200; Referees: Madsen, Mortensen (DEN)
9 October 2016; 18:30	3× (yellow card) 5× (suspension)	Report	6× (suspension)	Zlatorog Arena, Celje; Attendance: 3,200; Referees: Madsen, Mortensen (DEN)

12 October 2016; 18:30	Rhein-Neckar Löwen (Germany)	30–29	(Sweden) IFK Kristianstad	Fraport Arena, Frankfurt; Attendance: 1,312; Referees: Pavićević, Ražnatović (MNE)
12 October 2016; 18:30	Schmid 8	(17–13)	Tollbring 5	Fraport Arena, Frankfurt; Attendance: 1,312; Referees: Pavićević, Ražnatović (MNE)
12 October 2016; 18:30	1× (yellow card) 3× (suspension)	Report	3× (yellow card) 6× (suspension)	Fraport Arena, Frankfurt; Attendance: 1,312; Referees: Pavićević, Ražnatović (MNE)

15 October 2016; 18:00	Vive Tauron Kielce (Poland)	31–23	(Slovenia) Celje	Hala Legionów, Kielce; Attendance: 4,000; Referees: Pichon, Reveret (FRA)
15 October 2016; 18:00	Bielecki, Djukić 5	(16–15)	Janc 7	Hala Legionów, Kielce; Attendance: 4,000; Referees: Pichon, Reveret (FRA)
15 October 2016; 18:00	2× (yellow card) 2× (suspension)	Report	3× (yellow card) 5× (suspension)	Hala Legionów, Kielce; Attendance: 4,000; Referees: Pichon, Reveret (FRA)

15 October 2016; 20:00	Zagreb (Croatia)	22–27	(Belarus) Meshkov Brest	Arena Zagreb, Zagreb; Attendance: 9,000; Referees: Dentz, Reibel (FRA)
15 October 2016; 20:00	Horvat 6	(10–14)	Krištopāns 7	Arena Zagreb, Zagreb; Attendance: 9,000; Referees: Dentz, Reibel (FRA)
15 October 2016; 20:00	3× (yellow card) 4× (suspension) 1× (red card)	Report	2× (yellow card) 5× (suspension) 1× (red card)	Arena Zagreb, Zagreb; Attendance: 9,000; Referees: Dentz, Reibel (FRA)

16 October 2016; 17:30	Vardar (North Macedonia)	30–27	(Hungary) MOL-Pick Szeged	Jane Sandanski Arena, Skopje; Attendance: 4,857; Referees: Covalciuc, Covalciuc (MDA)
16 October 2016; 17:30	Dibirov 8	(16–15)	Balogh 9	Jane Sandanski Arena, Skopje; Attendance: 4,857; Referees: Covalciuc, Covalciuc (MDA)
16 October 2016; 17:30	3× (yellow card) 1× (suspension)	Report	3× (yellow card) 3× (suspension)	Jane Sandanski Arena, Skopje; Attendance: 4,857; Referees: Covalciuc, Covalciuc (MDA)

22 October 2016; 19:00	IFK Kristianstad (Sweden)	29–29	(Slovenia) Celje	Kristianstad Arena, Kristianstad; Attendance: 4,183; Referees: Harabagiu, Stănescu (ROU)
22 October 2016; 19:00	Tollbring 8	(14–11)	Janc 9	Kristianstad Arena, Kristianstad; Attendance: 4,183; Referees: Harabagiu, Stănescu (ROU)
22 October 2016; 19:00	3× (yellow card) 3× (suspension)	Report	3× (yellow card) 3× (suspension)	Kristianstad Arena, Kristianstad; Attendance: 4,183; Referees: Harabagiu, Stănescu (ROU)

22 October 2016; 20:00	Zagreb (Croatia)	28–27	(North Macedonia) Vardar	Arena Zagreb, Zagreb; Attendance: 9,850; Referees: Marín, García (ESP)
22 October 2016; 20:00	Marković 6	(12–17)	Dujshebaev 5	Arena Zagreb, Zagreb; Attendance: 9,850; Referees: Marín, García (ESP)
22 October 2016; 20:00	2× (yellow card) 3× (suspension)	Report	2× (yellow card) 2× (suspension)	Arena Zagreb, Zagreb; Attendance: 9,850; Referees: Marín, García (ESP)

23 October 2016; 17:00	MOL-Pick Szeged (Hungary)	24–22	(Belarus) Meshkov Brest	Városi Sportcsarnok, Szeged; Attendance: 3,200; Referees: Pandžić, Mosorinski (SRB)
23 October 2016; 17:00	Balogh 9	(11–10)	Atman, Stojković 4	Városi Sportcsarnok, Szeged; Attendance: 3,200; Referees: Pandžić, Mosorinski (SRB)
23 October 2016; 17:00	3× (yellow card) 4× (suspension)	Report	3× (yellow card) 6× (suspension)	Városi Sportcsarnok, Szeged; Attendance: 3,200; Referees: Pandžić, Mosorinski (SRB)

23 October 2016; 19:30	Vive Tauron Kielce (Poland)	26–34	(Germany) Rhein-Neckar Löwen	Hala Legionów, Kielce; Attendance: 4,200; Referees: López, Ramírez (ESP)
23 October 2016; 19:30	Bielecki 8	(15–16)	Baena 7	Hala Legionów, Kielce; Attendance: 4,200; Referees: López, Ramírez (ESP)
23 October 2016; 19:30	3× (yellow card) 2× (suspension)	Report	3× (yellow card) 3× (suspension)	Hala Legionów, Kielce; Attendance: 4,200; Referees: López, Ramírez (ESP)

10 November 2016; 18:15	Rhein-Neckar Löwen (Germany)	25–24	(Croatia) Zagreb	Fraport Arena, Frankfurt; Attendance: 1,546; Referees: Santos, Fonseca (POR)
10 November 2016; 18:15	Schmid, Steinhauser 7	(14–10)	Mandalinić 9	Fraport Arena, Frankfurt; Attendance: 1,546; Referees: Santos, Fonseca (POR)
10 November 2016; 18:15	2× (yellow card) 3× (suspension)	Report	3× (yellow card) 5× (suspension)	Fraport Arena, Frankfurt; Attendance: 1,546; Referees: Santos, Fonseca (POR)

12 November 2016; 17:30	Vardar (North Macedonia)	40–34	(Poland) Vive Tauron Kielce	Jane Sandanski Arena, Skopje; Attendance: 6,000; Referees: Baďura, Ondogrecula (SVK)
12 November 2016; 17:30	Karačić 9	(18–18)	Aguinagalde 8	Jane Sandanski Arena, Skopje; Attendance: 6,000; Referees: Baďura, Ondogrecula (SVK)
12 November 2016; 17:30	3× (yellow card) 4× (suspension)	Report	2× (yellow card) 2× (suspension)	Jane Sandanski Arena, Skopje; Attendance: 6,000; Referees: Baďura, Ondogrecula (SVK)

12 November 2016; 19:00	Celje (Slovenia)	25–31	(Hungary) MOL-Pick Szeged	Zlatorog Arena, Celje; Attendance: 3,300; Referees: Elíasson, Pálsson (ISL)
12 November 2016; 19:00	Žvižej 5	(15–16)	Gorbok 6	Zlatorog Arena, Celje; Attendance: 3,300; Referees: Elíasson, Pálsson (ISL)
12 November 2016; 19:00	3× (yellow card) 5× (suspension)	Report	3× (yellow card) 9× (suspension)	Zlatorog Arena, Celje; Attendance: 3,300; Referees: Elíasson, Pálsson (ISL)

12 November 2016; 19:30	Meshkov Brest (Belarus)	32–27	(Sweden) IFK Kristianstad	Universal Sports Complex Victoria, Brest; Attendance: 3,300; Referees: Mandák, Rudinský (SVK)
12 November 2016; 19:30	three players 5	(17–13)	Tollbring 8	Universal Sports Complex Victoria, Brest; Attendance: 3,300; Referees: Mandák, Rudinský (SVK)
12 November 2016; 19:30	2× (yellow card) 2× (suspension)	Report	2× (yellow card) 3× (suspension)	Universal Sports Complex Victoria, Brest; Attendance: 3,300; Referees: Mandák, Rudinský (SVK)

16 November 2016; 19:00	Zagreb (Croatia)	23–26	(Poland) Vive Tauron Kielce	Arena Zagreb, Zagreb; Attendance: 5,000; Referees: Dinu, Din (ROU)
16 November 2016; 19:00	Horvat, Mandalinić 6	(12–11)	Lijewski 5	Arena Zagreb, Zagreb; Attendance: 5,000; Referees: Dinu, Din (ROU)
16 November 2016; 19:00	3× (yellow card) 2× (suspension)	Report	3× (yellow card) 2× (suspension)	Arena Zagreb, Zagreb; Attendance: 5,000; Referees: Dinu, Din (ROU)

17 November 2016; 19:00	Rhein-Neckar Löwen (Germany)	27–33	(North Macedonia) Vardar	Fraport Arena, Frankfurt; Attendance: 2,649; Referees: Sondors, Līcis (LAT)
17 November 2016; 19:00	Sigurðsson 7	(16–17)	Cañellas 10	Fraport Arena, Frankfurt; Attendance: 2,649; Referees: Sondors, Līcis (LAT)
17 November 2016; 19:00	2× (yellow card) 1× (suspension)	Report	2× (yellow card) 2× (suspension)	Fraport Arena, Frankfurt; Attendance: 2,649; Referees: Sondors, Līcis (LAT)

19 November 2016; 18:15	IFK Kristianstad (Sweden)	21–29	(Hungary) MOL-Pick Szeged	Kristianstad Arena, Kristianstad; Attendance: 4,119; Referees: Erdoğan, Özdeniz (TUR)
19 November 2016; 18:15	Guðmundsson 5	(12–15)	Gorbok 7	Kristianstad Arena, Kristianstad; Attendance: 4,119; Referees: Erdoğan, Özdeniz (TUR)
19 November 2016; 18:15	3× (yellow card) 3× (suspension)	Report	3× (yellow card) 2× (suspension)	Kristianstad Arena, Kristianstad; Attendance: 4,119; Referees: Erdoğan, Özdeniz (TUR)

19 November 2016; 19:30	Meshkov Brest (Belarus)	29–29	(Slovenia) Celje	Universal Sports Complex Victoria, Brest; Attendance: 3,450; Referees: Tzaferopoulos, Bethmann (GRE)
19 November 2016; 19:30	Stojković 8	(14–15)	Žvižej 8	Universal Sports Complex Victoria, Brest; Attendance: 3,450; Referees: Tzaferopoulos, Bethmann (GRE)
19 November 2016; 19:30	3× (yellow card) 6× (suspension)	Report	3× (yellow card) 3× (suspension)	Universal Sports Complex Victoria, Brest; Attendance: 3,450; Referees: Tzaferopoulos, Bethmann (GRE)

26 November 2016; 17:30	Vardar (North Macedonia)	26–29	(Germany) Rhein-Neckar Löwen	Jane Sandanski Arena, Skopje; Attendance: 5,500; Referees: Horáček, Novotný (CZE)
26 November 2016; 17:30	Borozan, Cañellas 6	(15–15)	Larsen, Reinkind 7	Jane Sandanski Arena, Skopje; Attendance: 5,500; Referees: Horáček, Novotný (CZE)
26 November 2016; 17:30	3× (yellow card) 1× (suspension)	Report	2× (yellow card) 4× (suspension)	Jane Sandanski Arena, Skopje; Attendance: 5,500; Referees: Horáček, Novotný (CZE)

26 November 2016; 18:15	MOL-Pick Szeged (Hungary)	33–28	(Sweden) IFK Kristianstad	Városi Sportcsarnok, Szeged; Attendance: 3,100; Referees: Dentz, Reibel (FRA)
26 November 2016; 18:15	Gaber 6	(20–17)	Lipovac 6	Városi Sportcsarnok, Szeged; Attendance: 3,100; Referees: Dentz, Reibel (FRA)
26 November 2016; 18:15	3× (yellow card) 2× (suspension)	Report	3× (yellow card) 3× (suspension)	Városi Sportcsarnok, Szeged; Attendance: 3,100; Referees: Dentz, Reibel (FRA)

27 November 2016; 18:00	Vive Tauron Kielce (Poland)	29–25	(Croatia) Zagreb	Hala Legionów, Kielce; Attendance: 4,200; Referees: Gjeding, Hansen (DEN)
27 November 2016; 18:00	Aguinagalde 7	(11–12)	Mandalinić 7	Hala Legionów, Kielce; Attendance: 4,200; Referees: Gjeding, Hansen (DEN)
27 November 2016; 18:00	3× (yellow card) 3× (suspension)	Report	2× (yellow card) 5× (suspension)	Hala Legionów, Kielce; Attendance: 4,200; Referees: Gjeding, Hansen (DEN)

27 November 2016; 18:30	Celje (Slovenia)	36–36	(Belarus) Meshkov Brest	Zlatorog Arena, Celje; Attendance: 3,400; Referees: Erdoğan, Özdeniz (TUR)
27 November 2016; 18:30	Janc, Razgor 9	(18–17)	Ostroushko32 8	Zlatorog Arena, Celje; Attendance: 3,400; Referees: Erdoğan, Özdeniz (TUR)
27 November 2016; 18:30	3× (yellow card) 4× (suspension) 1× (red card)	Report	9× (suspension)	Zlatorog Arena, Celje; Attendance: 3,400; Referees: Erdoğan, Özdeniz (TUR)

30 November 2016; 19:00	IFK Kristianstad (Sweden)	29–29	(Belarus) Meshkov Brest	Kristianstad Arena, Kristianstad; Attendance: 4,010; Referees: López, Ramírez (ESP)
30 November 2016; 19:00	Tollbring 6	(15–17)	Krištopāns 7	Kristianstad Arena, Kristianstad; Attendance: 4,010; Referees: López, Ramírez (ESP)
30 November 2016; 19:00	3× (yellow card) 5× (suspension)	Report	3× (yellow card) 5× (suspension) 1× (red card)	Kristianstad Arena, Kristianstad; Attendance: 4,010; Referees: López, Ramírez (ESP)

1 December 2016; 19:00	Zagreb (Croatia)	25–21	(Germany) Rhein-Neckar Löwen	Arena Zagreb, Zagreb; Attendance: 6,508; Referees: Zotin, Volodkov (RUS)
1 December 2016; 19:00	Vori 5	(10–15)	Manaskov 5	Arena Zagreb, Zagreb; Attendance: 6,508; Referees: Zotin, Volodkov (RUS)
1 December 2016; 19:00	3× (yellow card) 2× (suspension)	Report	3× (yellow card) 2× (suspension)	Arena Zagreb, Zagreb; Attendance: 6,508; Referees: Zotin, Volodkov (RUS)

3 December 2016; 18:45	MOL-Pick Szeged (Hungary)	27–22	(Slovenia) Celje	Városi Sportcsarnok, Szeged; Attendance: 3,200; Referees: Mažeika, Gatelis (LTU)
3 December 2016; 18:45	Källman 6	(15–10)	Žvižej 7	Városi Sportcsarnok, Szeged; Attendance: 3,200; Referees: Mažeika, Gatelis (LTU)
3 December 2016; 18:45	2× (yellow card) 4× (suspension)	Report	3× (yellow card) 5× (suspension)	Városi Sportcsarnok, Szeged; Attendance: 3,200; Referees: Mažeika, Gatelis (LTU)

4 December 2016; 18:00	Vive Tauron Kielce (Poland)	27–24	(North Macedonia) Vardar	Hala Legionów, Kielce; Attendance: 4,200; Referees: Elíasson, Pálsson (ISL)
4 December 2016; 18:00	three players 4	(15–12)	Dujshebaev, Karačić 5	Hala Legionów, Kielce; Attendance: 4,200; Referees: Elíasson, Pálsson (ISL)
4 December 2016; 18:00	3× (yellow card) 8× (suspension) 1× (red card)	Report	3× (yellow card) 6× (suspension)	Hala Legionów, Kielce; Attendance: 4,200; Referees: Elíasson, Pálsson (ISL)

9 February 2017; 19:00	Rhein-Neckar Löwen (Germany)	28–25	(Poland) Vive Tauron Kielce	SAP Arena, Mannheim; Attendance: 7,285; Referees: Mažeika, Gatelis (LTU)
9 February 2017; 19:00	Sigurðsson 7	(16–13)	Aguinagalde 5	SAP Arena, Mannheim; Attendance: 7,285; Referees: Mažeika, Gatelis (LTU)
9 February 2017; 19:00	3× (yellow card) 5× (suspension)	Report	3× (yellow card) 5× (suspension)	SAP Arena, Mannheim; Attendance: 7,285; Referees: Mažeika, Gatelis (LTU)

9 February 2017; 20:30	Meshkov Brest (Belarus)	25–23	(Hungary) MOL-Pick Szeged	Universal Sports Complex Victoria, Brest; Attendance: 3,500; Referees: Pavićević, Ražnatović (MNE)
9 February 2017; 20:30	Jamali 8	(14–14)	Källman 6	Universal Sports Complex Victoria, Brest; Attendance: 3,500; Referees: Pavićević, Ražnatović (MNE)
9 February 2017; 20:30	2× (yellow card) 3× (suspension)	Report	2× (yellow card) 5× (suspension)	Universal Sports Complex Victoria, Brest; Attendance: 3,500; Referees: Pavićević, Ražnatović (MNE)

11 February 2017; 17:30	Vardar (North Macedonia)	25–20	(Croatia) Zagreb	Jane Sandanski Arena, Skopje; Attendance: 4,500; Referees: Erdoğan, Özdeniz (TUR)
11 February 2017; 17:30	Dujshebaev 7	(14–8)	Marković 6	Jane Sandanski Arena, Skopje; Attendance: 4,500; Referees: Erdoğan, Özdeniz (TUR)
11 February 2017; 17:30	3× (yellow card) 3× (suspension)	Report	2× (yellow card) 1× (suspension)	Jane Sandanski Arena, Skopje; Attendance: 4,500; Referees: Erdoğan, Özdeniz (TUR)

11 February 2017; 19:00	Celje (Slovenia)	27–28	(Sweden) IFK Kristianstad	Zlatorog Arena, Celje; Attendance: 3,300; Referees: Kékes, Kékes (HUN)
11 February 2017; 19:00	Janc 8	(13–13)	Sörensen, Tollbring 7	Zlatorog Arena, Celje; Attendance: 3,300; Referees: Kékes, Kékes (HUN)
11 February 2017; 19:00	3× (yellow card) 2× (suspension) 1× (red card)	Report	3× (yellow card) 5× (suspension) 1× (red card)	Zlatorog Arena, Celje; Attendance: 3,300; Referees: Kékes, Kékes (HUN)

18 February 2017; 17:30	MOL-Pick Szeged (Hungary)	21–23	(North Macedonia) Vardar	Városi Sportcsarnok, Szeged; Attendance: 3,200; Referees: Zotin, Volodkov (RUS)
18 February 2017; 17:30	Skube 6	(11–12)	Dibirov 6	Városi Sportcsarnok, Szeged; Attendance: 3,200; Referees: Zotin, Volodkov (RUS)
18 February 2017; 17:30	3× (yellow card) 4× (suspension)	Report	2× (yellow card) 3× (suspension)	Városi Sportcsarnok, Szeged; Attendance: 3,200; Referees: Zotin, Volodkov (RUS)

18 February 2017; 19:30	Meshkov Brest (Belarus)	21–21	(Croatia) Zagreb	Universal Sports Complex Victoria, Brest; Attendance: 3,400; Referees: Caçador, Nicolau (POR)
18 February 2017; 19:30	Jamali 7	(11–9)	Mandalinić 4	Universal Sports Complex Victoria, Brest; Attendance: 3,400; Referees: Caçador, Nicolau (POR)
18 February 2017; 19:30	3× (yellow card) 4× (suspension)	Report	3× (yellow card) 1× (suspension)	Universal Sports Complex Victoria, Brest; Attendance: 3,400; Referees: Caçador, Nicolau (POR)

19 February 2017; 17:30	IFK Kristianstad (Sweden)	29–31	(Germany) Rhein-Neckar Löwen	Kristianstad Arena, Kristianstad; Attendance: 4,355; Referees: Leandersson, Lindroos (FIN)
19 February 2017; 17:30	Guðmundsson 10	(16–15)	Baena 8	Kristianstad Arena, Kristianstad; Attendance: 4,355; Referees: Leandersson, Lindroos (FIN)
19 February 2017; 17:30	2× (yellow card) 3× (suspension)	Report	2× (yellow card)	Kristianstad Arena, Kristianstad; Attendance: 4,355; Referees: Leandersson, Lindroos (FIN)

19 February 2017; 19:00	Celje (Slovenia)	34–33	(Poland) Vive Tauron Kielce	Zlatorog Arena, Celje; Attendance: 3,901; Referees: Santos, Fonseca (POR)
19 February 2017; 19:00	Mačkovšek 8	(16–19)	Aguinagalde, Bielecki 6	Zlatorog Arena, Celje; Attendance: 3,901; Referees: Santos, Fonseca (POR)
19 February 2017; 19:00	3× (yellow card) 5× (suspension)	Report	2× (yellow card) 6× (suspension)	Zlatorog Arena, Celje; Attendance: 3,901; Referees: Santos, Fonseca (POR)

22 February 2017; 18:30	Rhein-Neckar Löwen (Germany)	25–24	(Belarus) Meshkov Brest	Fraport Arena, Frankfurt; Attendance: 1,866; Referees: Pichon, Reveret (FRA)
22 February 2017; 18:30	Schmid, Sigurðsson 7	(11–12)	three players 6	Fraport Arena, Frankfurt; Attendance: 1,866; Referees: Pichon, Reveret (FRA)
22 February 2017; 18:30	2× (yellow card) 2× (suspension)	Report	3× (yellow card) 3× (suspension)	Fraport Arena, Frankfurt; Attendance: 1,866; Referees: Pichon, Reveret (FRA)

25 February 2017; 17:30	Vardar (North Macedonia)	35–30	(Slovenia) Celje	Jane Sandanski Arena, Skopje; Attendance: 4,500; Referees: Sondors, Līcis (LAT)
25 February 2017; 17:30	Dujshebaev 8	(20–15)	Žiga Mlakar 8	Jane Sandanski Arena, Skopje; Attendance: 4,500; Referees: Sondors, Līcis (LAT)
25 February 2017; 17:30	2× (yellow card) 3× (suspension)	Report	2× (yellow card) 3× (suspension)	Jane Sandanski Arena, Skopje; Attendance: 4,500; Referees: Sondors, Līcis (LAT)

25 February 2017; 20:00	Zagreb (Croatia)	26–23	(Sweden) IFK Kristianstad	Arena Zagreb, Zagreb; Attendance: 8,000; Referees: Brunovský, Čanda (SVK)
25 February 2017; 20:00	Vori 5	(13–11)	Tollbring 6	Arena Zagreb, Zagreb; Attendance: 8,000; Referees: Brunovský, Čanda (SVK)
25 February 2017; 20:00	3× (yellow card) 1× (suspension)	Report	2× (yellow card) 2× (suspension)	Arena Zagreb, Zagreb; Attendance: 8,000; Referees: Brunovský, Čanda (SVK)

26 February 2017; 18:00	Vive Tauron Kielce (Poland)	28–24	(Hungary) MOL-Pick Szeged	Hala Legionów, Kielce; Attendance: 4,200; Referees: Kurtagic, Wetterwik (SWE)
26 February 2017; 18:00	Aguinagalde 8	(13–14)	Gorbok 6	Hala Legionów, Kielce; Attendance: 4,200; Referees: Kurtagic, Wetterwik (SWE)
26 February 2017; 18:00	3× (yellow card) 3× (suspension)	Report	3× (yellow card) 3× (suspension)	Hala Legionów, Kielce; Attendance: 4,200; Referees: Kurtagic, Wetterwik (SWE)

2 March 2017; 19:00	Celje (Slovenia)	37–31	(Germany) Rhein-Neckar Löwen	Zlatorog Arena, Celje; Attendance: 3,800; Referees: Caçador, Nicolau (POR)
2 March 2017; 19:00	Mačkovšek 9	(20–13)	Larsen 6	Zlatorog Arena, Celje; Attendance: 3,800; Referees: Caçador, Nicolau (POR)
2 March 2017; 19:00	3× (yellow card) 3× (suspension)	Report	3× (yellow card) 3× (suspension)	Zlatorog Arena, Celje; Attendance: 3,800; Referees: Caçador, Nicolau (POR)

4 March 2017; 17:30	MOL-Pick Szeged (Hungary)	26–21	(Croatia) Zagreb	Városi Sportcsarnok, Szeged; Attendance: 3,200; Referees: López, Ramírez (ESP)
4 March 2017; 17:30	Balogh 7	(14–12)	five players 3	Városi Sportcsarnok, Szeged; Attendance: 3,200; Referees: López, Ramírez (ESP)
4 March 2017; 17:30	2× (yellow card) 3× (suspension)	Report	3× (yellow card) 2× (suspension)	Városi Sportcsarnok, Szeged; Attendance: 3,200; Referees: López, Ramírez (ESP)

4 March 2017; 18:15	IFK Kristianstad (Sweden)	29–25	(Poland) Vive Tauron Kielce	Kristianstad Arena, Kristianstad; Attendance: 4,125; Referees: Brunner, Salah (SUI)
4 March 2017; 18:15	Henningsson, Sörensen 6	(15–13)	Jachlewski 5	Kristianstad Arena, Kristianstad; Attendance: 4,125; Referees: Brunner, Salah (SUI)
4 March 2017; 18:15	2× (yellow card) 6× (suspension)	Report	3× (yellow card) 3× (suspension)	Kristianstad Arena, Kristianstad; Attendance: 4,125; Referees: Brunner, Salah (SUI)

4 March 2017; 19:30	Meshkov Brest (Belarus)	30–26	(North Macedonia) Vardar	Universal Sports Complex Victoria, Brest; Attendance: 3,500; Referees: Nikolić, Stojković (SRB)
4 March 2017; 19:30	Krištopāns, Ostroushko 8	(15–13)	Čupić, Karačić 5	Universal Sports Complex Victoria, Brest; Attendance: 3,500; Referees: Nikolić, Stojković (SRB)
4 March 2017; 19:30	3× (yellow card) 3× (suspension)	Report	3× (yellow card) 2× (suspension)	Universal Sports Complex Victoria, Brest; Attendance: 3,500; Referees: Nikolić, Stojković (SRB)

8 March 2017; 20:45	Rhein-Neckar Löwen (Germany)	24–30	(Hungary) MOL-Pick Szeged	Fraport Arena, Frankfurt; Attendance: 1,230; Referees: Horáček, Novotný (CZE)
8 March 2017; 20:45	Pekeler 6	(12–14)	Källman 7	Fraport Arena, Frankfurt; Attendance: 1,230; Referees: Horáček, Novotný (CZE)
8 March 2017; 20:45	3× (yellow card) 3× (suspension)	Report	1× (yellow card) 4× (suspension)	Fraport Arena, Frankfurt; Attendance: 1,230; Referees: Horáček, Novotný (CZE)

9 March 2017; 19:00	Zagreb (Croatia)	23–21	(Slovenia) Celje	Arena Zagreb, Zagreb; Attendance: 11,500; Referees: Gousko, Repkin (BLR)
9 March 2017; 19:00	three players 5	(14–10)	Janc, Mačkovšek 6	Arena Zagreb, Zagreb; Attendance: 11,500; Referees: Gousko, Repkin (BLR)
9 March 2017; 19:00	3× (yellow card) 2× (suspension)	Report	3× (yellow card) 3× (suspension)	Arena Zagreb, Zagreb; Attendance: 11,500; Referees: Gousko, Repkin (BLR)

11 March 2017; 16:00	Vive Tauron Kielce (Poland)	35–27	(Belarus) Meshkov Brest	Hala Legionów, Kielce; Attendance: 4,200; Referees: Sigurjónsson, Pétursson (ISL)
11 March 2017; 16:00	Bielecki 7	(15–16)	Stojković 6	Hala Legionów, Kielce; Attendance: 4,200; Referees: Sigurjónsson, Pétursson (ISL)
11 March 2017; 16:00	3× (yellow card) 4× (suspension)	Report	3× (yellow card) 3× (suspension)	Hala Legionów, Kielce; Attendance: 4,200; Referees: Sigurjónsson, Pétursson (ISL)

12 March 2017; 17:30	Vardar (North Macedonia)	32–29	(Sweden) IFK Kristianstad	Jane Sandanski Arena, Skopje; Attendance: 4,000; Referees: Santos, Fonseca (POR)
12 March 2017; 17:30	Borozan 6	(17–13)	Sörensen 7	Jane Sandanski Arena, Skopje; Attendance: 4,000; Referees: Santos, Fonseca (POR)
12 March 2017; 17:30	2× (yellow card) 1× (suspension)	Report	2× (yellow card) 3× (suspension)	Jane Sandanski Arena, Skopje; Attendance: 4,000; Referees: Santos, Fonseca (POR)

=== Group C ===
Pos	Team	Pld	W	D	L	GF	GA	GD	Pts	Qualification
1	(France) Montpellier	10	8	0	2	302	252	+50	16	Playoffs
2	(Spain) Logroño	10	5	1	4	294	286	+8	11	Playoffs
3	(North Macedonia) Metalurg Skopje	10	5	0	5	240	251	−11	10	
4	(Slovakia) Tatran Prešov	10	4	1	5	259	271	−12	9	
5	(Norway) Elverum Håndball	10	3	2	5	257	274	−17	8	
6	(Russia) Chekhovskiye Medvedi	10	2	2	6	273	291	−18	6	

Source: EHF
Rules for classification: See Tiebreakers

22 September 2016; 19:00	Chekhovskiye Medvedi (Russia)	28–28	(Spain) Logroño	Olimpiysky Sport Palace, Chekhov; Attendance: 1,500; Referees: Santos, Fonseca (POR)
22 September 2016; 19:00	Kotov, Santalov 6	(14–16)	Langaro 5	Olimpiysky Sport Palace, Chekhov; Attendance: 1,500; Referees: Santos, Fonseca (POR)
22 September 2016; 19:00	3× (yellow card) 2× (suspension)	Report	3× (yellow card) 3× (suspension)	Olimpiysky Sport Palace, Chekhov; Attendance: 1,500; Referees: Santos, Fonseca (POR)

24 September 2016; 17:30	Metalurg Skopje (North Macedonia)	18–17	(Norway) Elverum Håndball	Boris Trajkovski Sports Center, Skopje; Attendance: 3,700; Referees: Baumgart, Wild (GER)
24 September 2016; 17:30	Taleski 13	(8–7)	Lindboe 6	Boris Trajkovski Sports Center, Skopje; Attendance: 3,700; Referees: Baumgart, Wild (GER)
24 September 2016; 17:30	3× (yellow card) 5× (suspension)	Report	3× (yellow card) 3× (suspension)	Boris Trajkovski Sports Center, Skopje; Attendance: 3,700; Referees: Baumgart, Wild (GER)

25 September 2016; 17:00	Montpellier (France)	28–23	(Slovakia) Tatran Prešov	Park&Suites Arena, Montpellier; Attendance: 3,000; Referees: Stark, Ştefan (ROU)
25 September 2016; 17:00	Kavtičnik 7	(14–14)	Rábek 6	Park&Suites Arena, Montpellier; Attendance: 3,000; Referees: Stark, Ştefan (ROU)
25 September 2016; 17:00	3× (yellow card) 4× (suspension)	Report	3× (yellow card) 5× (suspension)	Park&Suites Arena, Montpellier; Attendance: 3,000; Referees: Stark, Ştefan (ROU)

1 October 2016; 15:00	Tatran Prešov (Slovakia)	27–22	(North Macedonia) Metalurg Skopje	Tatran Handball Arena, Prešov; Attendance: 1,200; Referees: Baranowski, Lemanowicz (POL)
1 October 2016; 15:00	Hrstka 7	(11–12)	Dragaš 5	Tatran Handball Arena, Prešov; Attendance: 1,200; Referees: Baranowski, Lemanowicz (POL)
1 October 2016; 15:00	3× (yellow card) 1× (suspension)	Report	3× (yellow card) 2× (suspension)	Tatran Handball Arena, Prešov; Attendance: 1,200; Referees: Baranowski, Lemanowicz (POL)

1 October 2016; 20:30	Logroño (Spain)	31–30	(France) Montpellier	Palacio de los Deportes, Logroño; Attendance: 2,000; Referees: Kurtagic, Wetterwik (SWE)
1 October 2016; 20:30	Hisham, Langaro 7	(15–12)	Grébille 8	Palacio de los Deportes, Logroño; Attendance: 2,000; Referees: Kurtagic, Wetterwik (SWE)
1 October 2016; 20:30	2× (yellow card) 4× (suspension)	Report	3× (yellow card) 4× (suspension)	Palacio de los Deportes, Logroño; Attendance: 2,000; Referees: Kurtagic, Wetterwik (SWE)

2 October 2016; 18:15	Elverum Håndball (Norway)	28–28	(Russia) Chekhovskiye Medvedi	Terningen Arena, Elverum; Attendance: 1,829; Referees: Dentz, Reibel (FRA)
2 October 2016; 18:15	Iváncsik 8	(13–10)	Kovalev 6	Terningen Arena, Elverum; Attendance: 1,829; Referees: Dentz, Reibel (FRA)
2 October 2016; 18:15	3× (yellow card) 4× (suspension)	Report	3× (yellow card) 4× (suspension)	Terningen Arena, Elverum; Attendance: 1,829; Referees: Dentz, Reibel (FRA)

6 October 2016; 19:00	Chekhovskiye Medvedi (Russia)	25–21	(North Macedonia) Metalurg Skopje	Olimpiysky Sport Palace, Chekhov; Attendance: 1,100; Referees: Brunner, Salah (SUI)
6 October 2016; 19:00	Kornev, Shelestyukov 4	(14–8)	Obradović 8	Olimpiysky Sport Palace, Chekhov; Attendance: 1,100; Referees: Brunner, Salah (SUI)
6 October 2016; 19:00	3× (yellow card) 4× (suspension)	Report	2× (yellow card) 5× (suspension)	Olimpiysky Sport Palace, Chekhov; Attendance: 1,100; Referees: Brunner, Salah (SUI)

8 October 2016; 17:30	Logroño (Spain)	33–27	(Slovakia) Tatran Prešov	Palacio de los Deportes, Logroño; Attendance: 2,500; Referees: Olesen, Pedersen (DEN)
8 October 2016; 17:30	Fernández 10	(16–18)	Peskov 7	Palacio de los Deportes, Logroño; Attendance: 2,500; Referees: Olesen, Pedersen (DEN)
8 October 2016; 17:30	2× (yellow card) 4× (suspension)	Report	3× (yellow card) 6× (suspension)	Palacio de los Deportes, Logroño; Attendance: 2,500; Referees: Olesen, Pedersen (DEN)

9 October 2016; 18:15	Elverum Håndball (Norway)	32–31	(France) Montpellier	Terningen Arena, Elverum; Attendance: 1,879; Referees: Caçador, Nicolau (POR)
9 October 2016; 18:15	Mehl, Pujol 7	(18–14)	Dolenec 6	Terningen Arena, Elverum; Attendance: 1,879; Referees: Caçador, Nicolau (POR)
9 October 2016; 18:15	3× (yellow card) 2× (suspension)	Report	3× (yellow card) 4× (suspension)	Terningen Arena, Elverum; Attendance: 1,879; Referees: Caçador, Nicolau (POR)

15 October 2016; 16:00	Tatran Prešov (Slovakia)	25–27	(Norway) Elverum Håndball	Tatran Handball Arena, Prešov; Attendance: 2,050; Referees: Andorka, Hucker (HUN)
15 October 2016; 16:00	Hrstka 8	(16–17)	Iváncsik 7	Tatran Handball Arena, Prešov; Attendance: 2,050; Referees: Andorka, Hucker (HUN)
15 October 2016; 16:00	2× (yellow card) 3× (suspension)	Report	3× (yellow card) 3× (suspension)	Tatran Handball Arena, Prešov; Attendance: 2,050; Referees: Andorka, Hucker (HUN)

15 October 2016; 17:30	Metalurg Skopje (North Macedonia)	24–23	(Spain) Logroño	Boris Trajkovski Sports Center, Skopje; Attendance: 3,506; Referees: Herczeg, Südi (HUN)
15 October 2016; 17:30	Dragaš, Obradović 7	(11–9)	Langaro 7	Boris Trajkovski Sports Center, Skopje; Attendance: 3,506; Referees: Herczeg, Südi (HUN)
15 October 2016; 17:30	4× (yellow card) 2× (suspension)	Report	2× (yellow card) 3× (suspension)	Boris Trajkovski Sports Center, Skopje; Attendance: 3,506; Referees: Herczeg, Südi (HUN)

15 October 2016; 20:30	Montpellier (France)	26–22	(Russia) Chekhovskiye Medvedi	Park&Suites Arena, Montpellier; Attendance: 2,600; Referees: Erdoğan, Özdeniz (TUR)
15 October 2016; 20:30	Dolenec 8	(12–9)	Kuretkov 4	Park&Suites Arena, Montpellier; Attendance: 2,600; Referees: Erdoğan, Özdeniz (TUR)
15 October 2016; 20:30	3× (yellow card) 3× (suspension)	Report	3× (yellow card) 5× (suspension)	Park&Suites Arena, Montpellier; Attendance: 2,600; Referees: Erdoğan, Özdeniz (TUR)

22 October 2016; 16:00	Tatran Prešov (Slovakia)	30–28	(Russia) Chekhovskiye Medvedi	Tatran Handball Arena, Prešov; Attendance: 2,100; Referees: Baumgart, Wild (GER)
22 October 2016; 16:00	Hrstka 9	(17–11)	Ostashchenko 6	Tatran Handball Arena, Prešov; Attendance: 2,100; Referees: Baumgart, Wild (GER)
22 October 2016; 16:00	3× (yellow card) 6× (suspension)	Report	3× (yellow card) 5× (suspension) 1× (red card)	Tatran Handball Arena, Prešov; Attendance: 2,100; Referees: Baumgart, Wild (GER)

23 October 2016; 18:15	Elverum Håndball (Norway)	27–32	(Spain) Logroño	Terningen Arena, Elverum; Attendance: 2,202; Referees: Elíasson, Pálsson (ISL)
23 October 2016; 18:15	Poklar 7	(14–16)	Langaro 8	Terningen Arena, Elverum; Attendance: 2,202; Referees: Elíasson, Pálsson (ISL)
23 October 2016; 18:15	3× (yellow card) 6× (suspension)	Report	3× (yellow card) 5× (suspension)	Terningen Arena, Elverum; Attendance: 2,202; Referees: Elíasson, Pálsson (ISL)

23 October 2016; 18:45	Montpellier (France)	28–18	(North Macedonia) Metalurg Skopje	Park&Suites Arena, Montpellier; Attendance: 2,700; Referees: Geipel, Helbig (GER)
23 October 2016; 18:45	Grebille, Kavtičnik 5	(13–12)	Brajović 5	Park&Suites Arena, Montpellier; Attendance: 2,700; Referees: Geipel, Helbig (GER)
23 October 2016; 18:45	2× (yellow card) 2× (suspension)	Report	3× (yellow card) 5× (suspension)	Park&Suites Arena, Montpellier; Attendance: 2,700; Referees: Geipel, Helbig (GER)

10 November 2016; 18:45	Metalurg Skopje (North Macedonia)	24–30	(France) Montpellier	Boris Trajkovski Sports Center, Skopje; Attendance: 4,500; Referees: Leszczynski, Piechota (POL)
10 November 2016; 18:45	Obradović 10	(10–14)	Grébille 10	Boris Trajkovski Sports Center, Skopje; Attendance: 4,500; Referees: Leszczynski, Piechota (POL)
10 November 2016; 18:45	3× (yellow card) 3× (suspension)	Report	3× (yellow card) 4× (suspension)	Boris Trajkovski Sports Center, Skopje; Attendance: 4,500; Referees: Leszczynski, Piechota (POL)

10 November 2016; 19:00	Chekhovskiye Medvedi (Russia)	28–29	(Slovakia) Tatran Prešov	Olimpiysky Sport Palace, Chekhov; Attendance: 1,000; Referees: Pandžić, Šatordžija (BIH)
10 November 2016; 19:00	Santalov 9	(13–18)	Peskov 7	Olimpiysky Sport Palace, Chekhov; Attendance: 1,000; Referees: Pandžić, Šatordžija (BIH)
10 November 2016; 19:00	3× (yellow card) 3× (suspension)	Report	3× (yellow card) 4× (suspension)	Olimpiysky Sport Palace, Chekhov; Attendance: 1,000; Referees: Pandžić, Šatordžija (BIH)

12 November 2016; 18:30	Logroño (Spain)	28–21	(Norway) Elverum Håndball	Palacio de los Deportes, Logroño; Attendance: 2,200; Referees: Brunner, Salah (SUI)
12 November 2016; 18:30	Fernández, Muñoz 4	(11–8)	Iváncsik, Nergaard 4	Palacio de los Deportes, Logroño; Attendance: 2,200; Referees: Brunner, Salah (SUI)
12 November 2016; 18:30	2× (yellow card) 2× (suspension)	Report	3× (yellow card) 7× (suspension)	Palacio de los Deportes, Logroño; Attendance: 2,200; Referees: Brunner, Salah (SUI)

19 November 2016; 16:00	Tatran Prešov (Slovakia)	24–28	(France) Montpellier	Tatran Handball Arena, Prešov; Attendance: 2,500; Referees: Madsen, Mortensen (DEN)
19 November 2016; 16:00	Krok 6	(9–14)	Dolenec, Fabregas 6	Tatran Handball Arena, Prešov; Attendance: 2,500; Referees: Madsen, Mortensen (DEN)
19 November 2016; 16:00	3× (yellow card) 6× (suspension)	Report	3× (yellow card) 6× (suspension)	Tatran Handball Arena, Prešov; Attendance: 2,500; Referees: Madsen, Mortensen (DEN)

19 November 2016; 17:30	Logroño (Spain)	34–37	(Russia) Chekhovskiye Medvedi	Palacio de los Deportes, Logroño; Attendance: 2,300; Referees: Andorka, Hucker (HUN)
19 November 2016; 17:30	Rocas 11	(19–17)	Kotov 6	Palacio de los Deportes, Logroño; Attendance: 2,300; Referees: Andorka, Hucker (HUN)
19 November 2016; 17:30	3× (yellow card) 2× (suspension)	Report	2× (yellow card) 6× (suspension)	Palacio de los Deportes, Logroño; Attendance: 2,300; Referees: Andorka, Hucker (HUN)

20 November 2016; 18:15	Elverum Håndball (Norway)	26–31	(North Macedonia) Metalurg Skopje	Terningen Arena, Elverum; Attendance: 1,792; Referees: Nabokau, Kulik (BLR)
20 November 2016; 18:15	Poklar 7	(9–14)	Kuzmanovski 9	Terningen Arena, Elverum; Attendance: 1,792; Referees: Nabokau, Kulik (BLR)
20 November 2016; 18:15	2× (yellow card) 1× (suspension)	Report	3× (yellow card) 2× (suspension)	Terningen Arena, Elverum; Attendance: 1,792; Referees: Nabokau, Kulik (BLR)

24 November 2016; 19:00	Chekhovskiye Medvedi (Russia)	26–31	(Norway) Elverum Håndball	Olimpiysky Sport Palace, Chekhov; Attendance: 1,400; Referees: Harabagiu, Stănescu (ROU)
24 November 2016; 19:00	Santalov 8	(14–15)	Iváncsik 9	Olimpiysky Sport Palace, Chekhov; Attendance: 1,400; Referees: Harabagiu, Stănescu (ROU)
24 November 2016; 19:00	3× (yellow card) 3× (suspension)	Report	3× (yellow card) 3× (suspension)	Olimpiysky Sport Palace, Chekhov; Attendance: 1,400; Referees: Harabagiu, Stănescu (ROU)

26 November 2016; 18:30	Montpellier (France)	37–27	(Spain) Logroño	Park&Suites Arena, Montpellier; Attendance: 3,000; Referees: Sigurjónsson, Pétursson (ISL)
26 November 2016; 18:30	Grébille 10	(19–11)	Fernández 7	Park&Suites Arena, Montpellier; Attendance: 3,000; Referees: Sigurjónsson, Pétursson (ISL)
26 November 2016; 18:30	3× (yellow card) 5× (suspension)	Report	3× (yellow card) 3× (suspension) 1× (red card)	Park&Suites Arena, Montpellier; Attendance: 3,000; Referees: Sigurjónsson, Pétursson (ISL)

27 November 2016; 17:30	Metalurg Skopje (North Macedonia)	26–20	(Slovakia) Tatran Prešov	Boris Trajkovski Sports Center, Skopje; Attendance: 3,500; Referees: Brkic, Jusufhodzic (AUT)
27 November 2016; 17:30	Taleski 10	(11–10)	Rábek 8	Boris Trajkovski Sports Center, Skopje; Attendance: 3,500; Referees: Brkic, Jusufhodzic (AUT)
27 November 2016; 17:30	1× (yellow card) 2× (suspension)	Report	3× (yellow card) 3× (suspension)	Boris Trajkovski Sports Center, Skopje; Attendance: 3,500; Referees: Brkic, Jusufhodzic (AUT)

3 December 2016; 16:00	Chekhovskiye Medvedi (Russia)	27–33	(France) Montpellier	Olimpiysky Sport Palace, Chekhov; Attendance: 1,300; Referees: Johansson, Kliko (SWE)
3 December 2016; 16:00	Kornev 8	(13–14)	Anquetil, Dolenec 8	Olimpiysky Sport Palace, Chekhov; Attendance: 1,300; Referees: Johansson, Kliko (SWE)
3 December 2016; 16:00	3× (yellow card) 4× (suspension)	Report	3× (yellow card) 2× (suspension)	Olimpiysky Sport Palace, Chekhov; Attendance: 1,300; Referees: Johansson, Kliko (SWE)

3 December 2016; 17:30	Logroño (Spain)	31–25	(North Macedonia) Metalurg Skopje	Palacio de los Deportes, Logroño; Attendance: 2,400; Referees: Leandersson, Lindroos (FIN)
3 December 2016; 17:30	Fernández 10	(16–14)	Ilić 7	Palacio de los Deportes, Logroño; Attendance: 2,400; Referees: Leandersson, Lindroos (FIN)
3 December 2016; 17:30	3× (yellow card) 3× (suspension)	Report	2× (yellow card) 3× (suspension)	Palacio de los Deportes, Logroño; Attendance: 2,400; Referees: Leandersson, Lindroos (FIN)

4 December 2016; 15:45	Elverum Håndball (Norway)	24–24	(Slovakia) Tatran Prešov	Terningen Arena, Elverum; Attendance: 1,412; Referees: Leszczynski, Piechota (POL)
4 December 2016; 15:45	Lindboe 10	(10–9)	Rabek 10	Terningen Arena, Elverum; Attendance: 1,412; Referees: Leszczynski, Piechota (POL)
4 December 2016; 15:45	3× (yellow card) 2× (suspension)	Report	3× (yellow card) 3× (suspension)	Terningen Arena, Elverum; Attendance: 1,412; Referees: Leszczynski, Piechota (POL)

11 February 2017; 16:00	Tatran Prešov (Slovakia)	30–27	(Spain) Logroño	Tatran Handball Arena, Prešov; Attendance: 2,500; Referees: Nabokau, Kulik (BLR)
11 February 2017; 16:00	Rabek 9	(18–16)	Muñoz, Sánchez Migallón 5	Tatran Handball Arena, Prešov; Attendance: 2,500; Referees: Nabokau, Kulik (BLR)
11 February 2017; 16:00	3× (yellow card) 2× (suspension)	Report	2× (yellow card) 3× (suspension)	Tatran Handball Arena, Prešov; Attendance: 2,500; Referees: Nabokau, Kulik (BLR)

12 February 2017; 17:30	Metalurg Skopje (North Macedonia)	31–24	(Russia) Chekhovskiye Medvedi	Boris Trajkovski Sports Center, Skopje; Attendance: 3,560; Referees: Gasmi, Gasmi (FRA)
12 February 2017; 17:30	Ilić, Obradović 7	(15–10)	Kotov 5	Boris Trajkovski Sports Center, Skopje; Attendance: 3,560; Referees: Gasmi, Gasmi (FRA)
12 February 2017; 17:30	2× (yellow card) 3× (suspension)	Report	2× (yellow card) 3× (suspension)	Boris Trajkovski Sports Center, Skopje; Attendance: 3,560; Referees: Gasmi, Gasmi (FRA)

12 February 2017; 17:30	Montpellier (France)	31–24	(Norway) Elverum Håndball	Park&Suites Arena, Montpellier; Attendance: 3,000; Referees: Cindrić, Gonzurek (CRO)
12 February 2017; 17:30	Truchanovičius 7	(16–11)	Pujol 8	Park&Suites Arena, Montpellier; Attendance: 3,000; Referees: Cindrić, Gonzurek (CRO)
12 February 2017; 17:30	3× (yellow card) 3× (suspension)	Report	3× (yellow card) 3× (suspension)	Park&Suites Arena, Montpellier; Attendance: 3,000; Referees: Cindrić, Gonzurek (CRO)

=== Group D ===
Pos	Team	Pld	W	D	L	GF	GA	GD	Pts	Qualification
1	(France) HBC Nantes	10	8	1	1	312	270	+42	17	Playoffs
2	(Ukraine) Motor Zaporizhzhia	10	7	1	2	308	272	+36	15	Playoffs
3	(Turkey) Beşiktaş	10	5	1	4	275	289	−14	11	
4	(Romania) Dinamo București	10	3	2	5	294	294	0	8	
5	(Denmark) Team Tvis Holstebro	10	2	1	7	281	314	−33	5	
6	(Portugal) ABC/UMinho	10	2	0	8	289	320	−31	4	

Source: EHF
Rules for classification: See Tiebreakers

21 September 2016; 19:00	Beşiktaş (Turkey)	33–31	(Portugal) ABC/UMinho	Recep Topaloğlu Sports Hall, İzmit; Attendance: 1,565; Referees: Kristiansen, Pettersen (NOR)
21 September 2016; 19:00	Döne 9	(21–18)	three players 6	Recep Topaloğlu Sports Hall, İzmit; Attendance: 1,565; Referees: Kristiansen, Pettersen (NOR)
21 September 2016; 19:00	3× (yellow card) 5× (suspension)	Report	3× (yellow card) 6× (suspension)	Recep Topaloğlu Sports Hall, İzmit; Attendance: 1,565; Referees: Kristiansen, Pettersen (NOR)

22 September 2016; 19:30	Motor Zaporizhzhia (Ukraine)	26–26	(France) HBC Nantes	Kharkiv Sport Hall, Kharkiv; Attendance: 2,110; Referees: Pandžić, Mosorinski (SRB)
22 September 2016; 19:30	Zhukov 5	(15–16)	Klein 8	Kharkiv Sport Hall, Kharkiv; Attendance: 2,110; Referees: Pandžić, Mosorinski (SRB)
22 September 2016; 19:30	3× (yellow card) 2× (suspension)	Report	3× (yellow card) 3× (suspension)	Kharkiv Sport Hall, Kharkiv; Attendance: 2,110; Referees: Pandžić, Mosorinski (SRB)

25 September 2016; 16:50	Team Tvis Holstebro (Denmark)	32–32	(Romania) Dinamo București	Gråkjær Arena, Holstebro; Attendance: 1,905; Referees: Caçador, Nicolau (POR)
25 September 2016; 16:50	Kildelund 9	(16–16)	Savenco 6	Gråkjær Arena, Holstebro; Attendance: 1,905; Referees: Caçador, Nicolau (POR)
25 September 2016; 16:50	3× (yellow card) 2× (suspension)	Report	3× (yellow card) 4× (suspension)	Gråkjær Arena, Holstebro; Attendance: 1,905; Referees: Caçador, Nicolau (POR)

29 September 2016; 18:00	Dinamo București (Romania)	35–31	(Ukraine) Motor Zaporizhzhia	Dinamo Polyvalent Hall, Bucharest; Attendance: 2,100; Referees: Mitrović, Vešović (MNE)
29 September 2016; 18:00	Vranković 8	(15–13)	Soroka 8	Dinamo Polyvalent Hall, Bucharest; Attendance: 2,100; Referees: Mitrović, Vešović (MNE)
29 September 2016; 18:00	2× (yellow card) 8× (suspension)	Report	3× (yellow card) 4× (suspension)	Dinamo Polyvalent Hall, Bucharest; Attendance: 2,100; Referees: Mitrović, Vešović (MNE)

1 October 2016; 17:00	ABC/UMinho (Portugal)	32–27	(Denmark) Team Tvis Holstebro	Pavilhão Flávio Sá Leite, Braga; Attendance: 1,500; Referees: Marín, García (ESP)
1 October 2016; 17:00	Pereira 10	(16–14)	Bramming 9	Pavilhão Flávio Sá Leite, Braga; Attendance: 1,500; Referees: Marín, García (ESP)
1 October 2016; 17:00	2× (yellow card) 3× (suspension)	Report	3× (yellow card) 5× (suspension)	Pavilhão Flávio Sá Leite, Braga; Attendance: 1,500; Referees: Marín, García (ESP)

1 October 2016; 18:30	HBC Nantes (France)	33–19	(Turkey) Beşiktaş	Parc des expositions de la Beaujoire, Nantes; Attendance: 3,811; Referees: Sigurjónsson, Pétursson (ISL)
1 October 2016; 18:30	Burić 6	(16–9)	Döne 5	Parc des expositions de la Beaujoire, Nantes; Attendance: 3,811; Referees: Sigurjónsson, Pétursson (ISL)
1 October 2016; 18:30	3× (yellow card) 3× (suspension)	Report	3× (yellow card) 4× (suspension)	Parc des expositions de la Beaujoire, Nantes; Attendance: 3,811; Referees: Sigurjónsson, Pétursson (ISL)

9 October 2016; 16:00	HBC Nantes (France)	35–33	(Portugal) ABC/UMinho	Parc des expositions de la Beaujoire, Nantes; Attendance: 3,892; Referees: Leszczynski, Piechota (POL)
9 October 2016; 16:00	Claire, Tournat 8	(20–16)	Pereira 9	Parc des expositions de la Beaujoire, Nantes; Attendance: 3,892; Referees: Leszczynski, Piechota (POL)
9 October 2016; 16:00	3× (yellow card) 3× (suspension)	Report	3× (yellow card) 6× (suspension)	Parc des expositions de la Beaujoire, Nantes; Attendance: 3,892; Referees: Leszczynski, Piechota (POL)

9 October 2016; 16:00	Motor Zaporizhzhia (Ukraine)	34–28	(Denmark) Team Tvis Holstebro	Kharkiv Sport Hall, Kharkiv; Attendance: 2,100; Referees: Tzaferopoulos, Bethmann (GRE)
9 October 2016; 16:00	Kalarash, Malašinskas 6	(19–10)	Bramming 10	Kharkiv Sport Hall, Kharkiv; Attendance: 2,100; Referees: Tzaferopoulos, Bethmann (GRE)
9 October 2016; 16:00	3× (yellow card) 2× (suspension)	Report	2× (yellow card) 2× (suspension)	Kharkiv Sport Hall, Kharkiv; Attendance: 2,100; Referees: Tzaferopoulos, Bethmann (GRE)

9 October 2016; 17:15	Dinamo București (Romania)	26–26	(Turkey) Beşiktaş	Dinamo Polyvalent Hall, Bucharest; Attendance: 2,400; Referees: Kaveshnikov, Plotnikov (RUS)
9 October 2016; 17:15	three players 4	(11–13)	Vražalić 8	Dinamo Polyvalent Hall, Bucharest; Attendance: 2,400; Referees: Kaveshnikov, Plotnikov (RUS)
9 October 2016; 17:15	3× (yellow card) 1× (suspension) 1× (red card)	Report	2× (yellow card) 4× (suspension)	Dinamo Polyvalent Hall, Bucharest; Attendance: 2,400; Referees: Kaveshnikov, Plotnikov (RUS)

15 October 2016; 17:00	ABC/UMinho (Portugal)	34–32	(Romania) Dinamo București	Pavilhão Flávio Sá Leite, Braga; Attendance: 2,000; Referees: Pandžić, Šatordžija (BIH)
15 October 2016; 17:00	Gomes 7	(18–18)	S. Esteki 11	Pavilhão Flávio Sá Leite, Braga; Attendance: 2,000; Referees: Pandžić, Šatordžija (BIH)
15 October 2016; 17:00	3× (yellow card) 3× (suspension)	Report	3× (yellow card) 6× (suspension)	Pavilhão Flávio Sá Leite, Braga; Attendance: 2,000; Referees: Pandžić, Šatordžija (BIH)

15 October 2016; 18:30	Beşiktaş (Turkey)	23–22	(Ukraine) Motor Zaporizhzhia	Recep Topaloğlu Sports Hall, İzmit; Attendance: 1,400; Referees: Mandák, Rudinský (SVK)
15 October 2016; 18:30	Özbahar, Pribak 5	(11–7)	Shelmenko 6	Recep Topaloğlu Sports Hall, İzmit; Attendance: 1,400; Referees: Mandák, Rudinský (SVK)
15 October 2016; 18:30	2× (yellow card) 7× (suspension)	Report	3× (yellow card) 5× (suspension)	Recep Topaloğlu Sports Hall, İzmit; Attendance: 1,400; Referees: Mandák, Rudinský (SVK)

16 October 2016; 15:00	Team Tvis Holstebro (Denmark)	25–35	(France) HBC Nantes	Gråkjær Arena, Holstebro; Attendance: 2,447; Referees: Schulze, Tönnies (GER)
16 October 2016; 15:00	Bramming 9	(13–18)	Claire 7	Gråkjær Arena, Holstebro; Attendance: 2,447; Referees: Schulze, Tönnies (GER)
16 October 2016; 15:00	3× (yellow card) 5× (suspension)	Report	3× (yellow card) 5× (suspension)	Gråkjær Arena, Holstebro; Attendance: 2,447; Referees: Schulze, Tönnies (GER)

22 October 2016; 15:00	Beşiktaş (Turkey)	36–27	(Denmark) Team Tvis Holstebro	Recep Topaloğlu Sports Hall, İzmit; Attendance: 1,100; Referees: Brunner, Salah (SUI)
22 October 2016; 15:00	Döne 8	(15–16)	Bramming 7	Recep Topaloğlu Sports Hall, İzmit; Attendance: 1,100; Referees: Brunner, Salah (SUI)
22 October 2016; 15:00	2× (yellow card) 3× (suspension)	Report	2× (yellow card) 7× (suspension)	Recep Topaloğlu Sports Hall, İzmit; Attendance: 1,100; Referees: Brunner, Salah (SUI)

22 October 2016; 17:30	Dinamo București (Romania)	26–27	(France) HBC Nantes	Dinamo Polyvalent Hall, Bucharest; Attendance: 2,538; Referees: Dobrovits, Tájok (HUN)
22 October 2016; 17:30	Asoltanei 6	(15–11)	Derot 7	Dinamo Polyvalent Hall, Bucharest; Attendance: 2,538; Referees: Dobrovits, Tájok (HUN)
22 October 2016; 17:30	3× (yellow card) 1× (suspension)	Report	2× (yellow card) 1× (suspension)	Dinamo Polyvalent Hall, Bucharest; Attendance: 2,538; Referees: Dobrovits, Tájok (HUN)

22 October 2016; 18:00	Motor Zaporizhzhia (Ukraine)	27–23	(Portugal) ABC/UMinho	Kharkiv Sport Hall, Kharkiv; Attendance: 2,200; Referees: Gousko, Repkin (BLR)
22 October 2016; 18:00	Shelmenko 8	(13–9)	Pereira 5	Kharkiv Sport Hall, Kharkiv; Attendance: 2,200; Referees: Gousko, Repkin (BLR)
22 October 2016; 18:00	3× (yellow card) 4× (suspension)	Report	3× (yellow card) 4× (suspension)	Kharkiv Sport Hall, Kharkiv; Attendance: 2,200; Referees: Gousko, Repkin (BLR)

12 November 2016; 17:00	ABC/UMinho (Portugal)	22–35	(Ukraine) Motor Zaporizhzhia	Pavilhão Flávio Sá Leite, Braga; Attendance: 1,200; Referees: Pavićević, Ražnatović (MNE)
12 November 2016; 17:00	Pereira 5	(9–18)	Pukhouski 8	Pavilhão Flávio Sá Leite, Braga; Attendance: 1,200; Referees: Pavićević, Ražnatović (MNE)
12 November 2016; 17:00	3× (yellow card) 3× (suspension)	Report	1× (yellow card) 7× (suspension)	Pavilhão Flávio Sá Leite, Braga; Attendance: 1,200; Referees: Pavićević, Ražnatović (MNE)

13 November 2016; 15:10	Team Tvis Holstebro (Denmark)	29–25	(Turkey) Beşiktaş	Gråkjær Arena, Holstebro; Attendance: 1,923; Referees: Konjičanin, Konjičanin (BIH)
13 November 2016; 15:10	Bramming 9	(14–14)	Demirezen 6	Gråkjær Arena, Holstebro; Attendance: 1,923; Referees: Konjičanin, Konjičanin (BIH)
13 November 2016; 15:10	2× (yellow card) 4× (suspension)	Report	3× (yellow card) 2× (suspension)	Gråkjær Arena, Holstebro; Attendance: 1,923; Referees: Konjičanin, Konjičanin (BIH)

13 November 2016; 17:00	HBC Nantes (France)	26–24	(Romania) Dinamo București	Parc des expositions de la Beaujoire, Nantes; Attendance: 4,500; Referees: Gubica, Milošević (CRO)
13 November 2016; 17:00	Balaguer 9	(12–12)	S. Esteki 8	Parc des expositions de la Beaujoire, Nantes; Attendance: 4,500; Referees: Gubica, Milošević (CRO)
13 November 2016; 17:00	3× (yellow card)	Report	3× (yellow card) 2× (suspension)	Parc des expositions de la Beaujoire, Nantes; Attendance: 4,500; Referees: Gubica, Milošević (CRO)

17 November 2016; 19:30	Dinamo București (Romania)	30–25	(Denmark) Team Tvis Holstebro	Dinamo Polyvalent Hall, Bucharest; Attendance: 1,500; Referees: Baranowski, Lemanowicz (POL)
17 November 2016; 19:30	S. Esteki 7	(12–12)	Bramming 12	Dinamo Polyvalent Hall, Bucharest; Attendance: 1,500; Referees: Baranowski, Lemanowicz (POL)
17 November 2016; 19:30	3× (yellow card) 5× (suspension)	Report	3× (yellow card) 1× (suspension)	Dinamo Polyvalent Hall, Bucharest; Attendance: 1,500; Referees: Baranowski, Lemanowicz (POL)

19 November 2016; 17:00	ABC/UMinho (Portugal)	27–28	(Turkey) Beşiktaş	Pavilhão Flávio Sá Leite, Braga; Attendance: 1,500; Referees: Lah, Sok (SLO)
19 November 2016; 17:00	Spinola 8	(14–13)	Döne 11	Pavilhão Flávio Sá Leite, Braga; Attendance: 1,500; Referees: Lah, Sok (SLO)
19 November 2016; 17:00	2× (yellow card) 5× (suspension)	Report	2× (yellow card) 4× (suspension)	Pavilhão Flávio Sá Leite, Braga; Attendance: 1,500; Referees: Lah, Sok (SLO)

19 November 2016; 18:30	HBC Nantes (France)	32–34	(Ukraine) Motor Zaporizhzhia	Parc des expositions de la Beaujoire, Nantes; Attendance: 4,250; Referees: Nikolov, Nachevski (MKD)
19 November 2016; 18:30	Claire, Derot 7	(19–16)	Kalarash, Kozakevych 6	Parc des expositions de la Beaujoire, Nantes; Attendance: 4,250; Referees: Nikolov, Nachevski (MKD)
19 November 2016; 18:30	3× (yellow card) 2× (suspension)	Report	3× (yellow card) 2× (suspension) 1× (red card)	Parc des expositions de la Beaujoire, Nantes; Attendance: 4,250; Referees: Nikolov, Nachevski (MKD)

26 November 2016; 16:00	Motor Zaporizhzhia (Ukraine)	35–27	(Romania) Dinamo București	Kharkiv Sport Hall, Kharkiv; Attendance: 2,700; Referees: Brunner, Salah (SUI)
26 November 2016; 16:00	Pukhouski 8	(19–10)	S. Esteki 11	Kharkiv Sport Hall, Kharkiv; Attendance: 2,700; Referees: Brunner, Salah (SUI)
26 November 2016; 16:00	3× (yellow card) 6× (suspension) 1× (red card)	Report	3× (yellow card) 3× (suspension) 1× (red card)	Kharkiv Sport Hall, Kharkiv; Attendance: 2,700; Referees: Brunner, Salah (SUI)

27 November 2016; 15:00	Team Tvis Holstebro (Denmark)	34–29	(Portugal) ABC/UMinho	Gråkjær Arena, Holstebro; Attendance: 1,492; Referees: Tzaferopoulos, Bethmann (GRE)
27 November 2016; 15:00	Svavarsson 8	(18–13)	Spinola 7	Gråkjær Arena, Holstebro; Attendance: 1,492; Referees: Tzaferopoulos, Bethmann (GRE)
27 November 2016; 15:00	2× (yellow card) 4× (suspension)	Report	3× (yellow card) 2× (suspension)	Gråkjær Arena, Holstebro; Attendance: 1,492; Referees: Tzaferopoulos, Bethmann (GRE)

27 November 2016; 17:00	Beşiktaş (Turkey)	28–33	(France) HBC Nantes	Recep Topaloğlu Sports Hall, İzmit; Attendance: 1,500; Referees: Andorka, Hucker (HUN)
27 November 2016; 17:00	Özbahar 8	(14–16)	Burić 7	Recep Topaloğlu Sports Hall, İzmit; Attendance: 1,500; Referees: Andorka, Hucker (HUN)
27 November 2016; 17:00	2× (yellow card) 3× (suspension)	Report	2× (yellow card) 1× (suspension)	Recep Topaloğlu Sports Hall, İzmit; Attendance: 1,500; Referees: Andorka, Hucker (HUN)

1 December 2016; 19:30	Dinamo București (Romania)	35–29	(Portugal) ABC/UMinho	Dinamo Polyvalent Hall, Bucharest; Attendance: 1,500; Referees: Baumgart, Wild (GER)
1 December 2016; 19:30	S. Esteki 14	(20–15)	three players 7	Dinamo Polyvalent Hall, Bucharest; Attendance: 1,500; Referees: Baumgart, Wild (GER)
1 December 2016; 19:30	3× (yellow card) 5× (suspension)	Report	3× (yellow card) 4× (suspension)	Dinamo Polyvalent Hall, Bucharest; Attendance: 1,500; Referees: Baumgart, Wild (GER)

3 December 2016; 18:30	HBC Nantes (France)	31–26	(Denmark) Team Tvis Holstebro	Parc des expositions de la Beaujoire, Nantes; Attendance: 3,800; Referees: Lah, Sok (SLO)
3 December 2016; 18:30	Balaguer, Tournat 5	(15–16)	Svavarsson 7	Parc des expositions de la Beaujoire, Nantes; Attendance: 3,800; Referees: Lah, Sok (SLO)
3 December 2016; 18:30	3× (yellow card) 6× (suspension) 1× (red card)	Report	1× (yellow card) 7× (suspension)	Parc des expositions de la Beaujoire, Nantes; Attendance: 3,800; Referees: Lah, Sok (SLO)

4 December 2016; 17:00	Motor Zaporizhzhia (Ukraine)	34–28	(Turkey) Beşiktaş	Kharkiv Sport Hall, Kharkiv; Attendance: 2,900; Referees: Baranowski, Lemanowicz (POL)
4 December 2016; 17:00	Kalarash 9	(20–13)	Vražalić 8	Kharkiv Sport Hall, Kharkiv; Attendance: 2,900; Referees: Baranowski, Lemanowicz (POL)
4 December 2016; 17:00	3× (yellow card) 10× (suspension) 2× (red card)	Report	3× (yellow card) 11× (suspension) 1× (red card)	Kharkiv Sport Hall, Kharkiv; Attendance: 2,900; Referees: Baranowski, Lemanowicz (POL)

11 February 2017; 15:30	ABC/UMinho (Portugal)	29–34	(France) HBC Nantes	Pavilhão Flávio Sá Leite, Braga; Attendance: 1,500; Referees: Konjičanin, Konjičanin (BIH)
11 February 2017; 15:30	Pesqueira 5	(13–18)	Klein 8	Pavilhão Flávio Sá Leite, Braga; Attendance: 1,500; Referees: Konjičanin, Konjičanin (BIH)
11 February 2017; 15:30	3× (yellow card) 3× (suspension)	Report	3× (yellow card) 1× (suspension)	Pavilhão Flávio Sá Leite, Braga; Attendance: 1,500; Referees: Konjičanin, Konjičanin (BIH)

11 February 2017; 16:00	Beşiktaş (Turkey)	29–27	(Romania) Dinamo București	Recep Topaloğlu Sports Hall, İzmit; Attendance: 1,250; Referees: Sager, Styger (SUI)
11 February 2017; 16:00	Özbahar 6	(14–12)	Vranković 7	Recep Topaloğlu Sports Hall, İzmit; Attendance: 1,250; Referees: Sager, Styger (SUI)
11 February 2017; 16:00	3× (yellow card) 4× (suspension)	Report	3× (yellow card) 3× (suspension)	Recep Topaloğlu Sports Hall, İzmit; Attendance: 1,250; Referees: Sager, Styger (SUI)

12 February 2017; 15:00	Team Tvis Holstebro (Denmark)	28–30	(Ukraine) Motor Zaporizhzhia	Gråkjær Arena, Holstebro; Attendance: 2,184; Referees: Dobrovits, Tájok (HUN)
12 February 2017; 15:00	Bramming 7	(17–15)	Kozakevych 7	Gråkjær Arena, Holstebro; Attendance: 2,184; Referees: Dobrovits, Tájok (HUN)
12 February 2017; 15:00	3× (yellow card) 7× (suspension)	Report	3× (yellow card) 5× (suspension)	Gråkjær Arena, Holstebro; Attendance: 2,184; Referees: Dobrovits, Tájok (HUN)

== Playoffs ==
The top two teams from Groups C and D contest a playoff to determine the two sides advancing to the knockout phase. The winners of each group will face the runners-up of the other group in a two-legged tie. The first leg will be played on 1–5 March 2017 and the second leg on 7–12 March 2017.

Team 1	Agg.	Team 2	1st leg	2nd leg
Logroño (Spain)	56–68	(France) HBC Nantes	25–31	31–37
Motor Zaporizhzhia (Ukraine)	63–65	(France) Montpellier	34–36	29–29

=== Matches ===
5 March 2017; 20:00	Logroño (Spain)	25–31	(France) HBC Nantes	Palacio de los Deportes, Logroño; Attendance: 2,200; Referees: Madsen, Mortensen (DEN)
5 March 2017; 20:00	Langaro 7	(13–13)	Gurbindo 9	Palacio de los Deportes, Logroño; Attendance: 2,200; Referees: Madsen, Mortensen (DEN)
5 March 2017; 20:00	3× (yellow card) 1× (suspension)	Report	3× (yellow card) 5× (suspension)	Palacio de los Deportes, Logroño; Attendance: 2,200; Referees: Madsen, Mortensen (DEN)

11 March 2017; 20:00	HBC Nantes (France)	37–31	(Spain) Logroño	Parc des expositions de la Beaujoire, Nantes; Attendance: 4,438; Referees: Mažeika, Gatelis (LTU)
11 March 2017; 20:00	Derot 8	(21–15)	Fernández Pérez 6	Parc des expositions de la Beaujoire, Nantes; Attendance: 4,438; Referees: Mažeika, Gatelis (LTU)
11 March 2017; 20:00	3× (yellow card) 1× (suspension)	Report	3× (yellow card) 2× (suspension)	Parc des expositions de la Beaujoire, Nantes; Attendance: 4,438; Referees: Mažeika, Gatelis (LTU)

HBC Nantes won 68–56 on aggregate.

4 March 2017; 18:00	Motor Zaporizhzhia (Ukraine)	34–36	(France) Montpellier	Kharkiv Sport Hall, Kharkiv; Attendance: 3,100; Referees: Dinu, Din (ROU)
4 March 2017; 18:00	Soroka 10	(15–18)	Truchanovičius 8	Kharkiv Sport Hall, Kharkiv; Attendance: 3,100; Referees: Dinu, Din (ROU)
4 March 2017; 18:00	3× (yellow card) 6× (suspension)	Report	3× (yellow card) 6× (suspension)	Kharkiv Sport Hall, Kharkiv; Attendance: 3,100; Referees: Dinu, Din (ROU)

11 March 2017; 17:00	Montpellier (France)	29–29	(Ukraine) Motor Zaporizhzhia	Park&Suites Arena, Montpellier; Attendance: 2,800; Referees: Pandžić, Mosorinski (SRB)
11 March 2017; 17:00	Dolenec 8	(14–13)	Kozakevytch 8	Park&Suites Arena, Montpellier; Attendance: 2,800; Referees: Pandžić, Mosorinski (SRB)
11 March 2017; 17:00	3× (yellow card) 3× (suspension)	Report	3× (yellow card) 7× (suspension)	Park&Suites Arena, Montpellier; Attendance: 2,800; Referees: Pandžić, Mosorinski (SRB)

Montpellier Handball won 65–63 on aggregate.
