= Stipe Mandalinić =

Croatian handball player (born 1992)

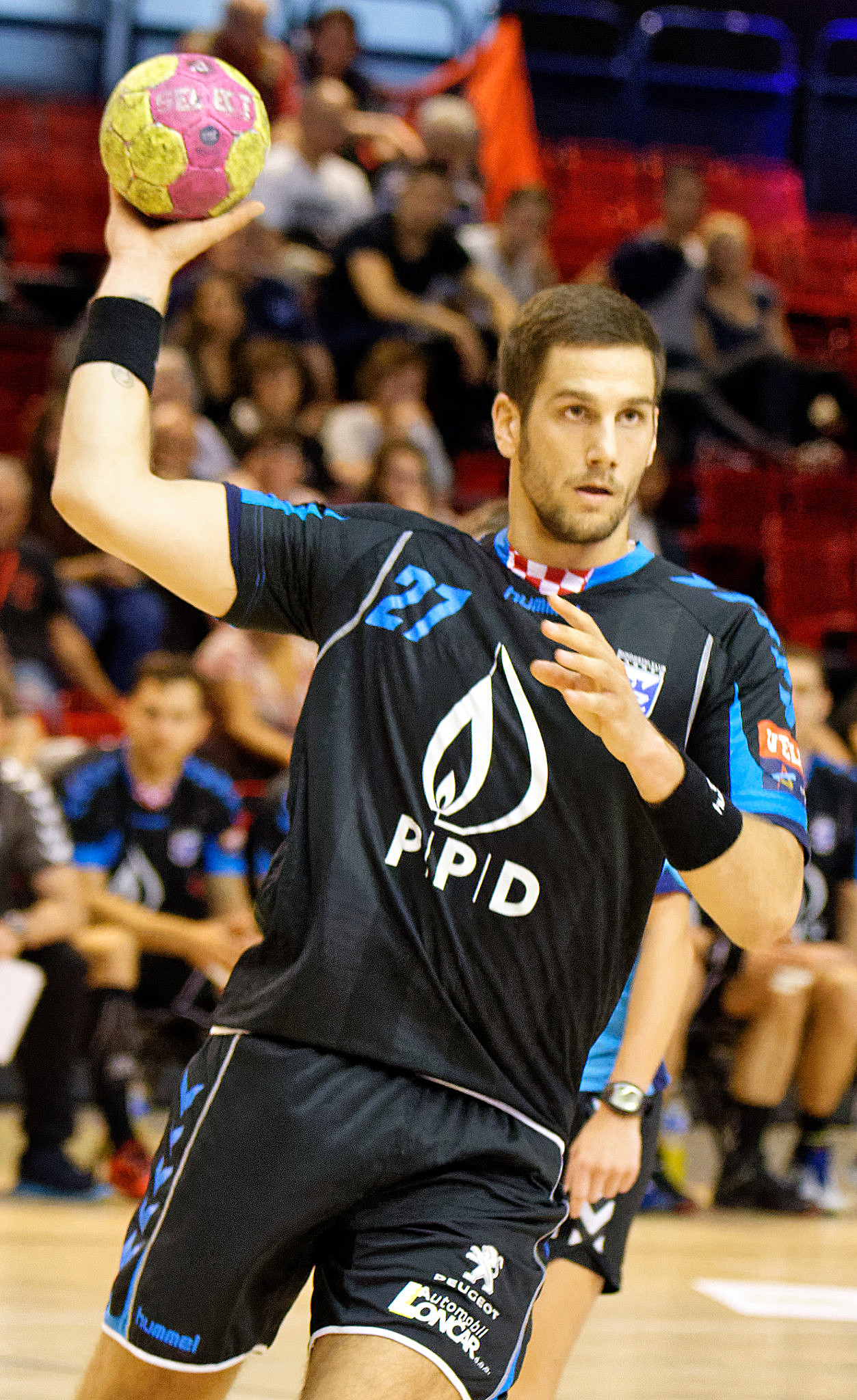
- Stipe Mandalinić in 2016

Personal information
- Nationality: Croatian
- Born: 9 September 1992 (age 34) Split, Croatia
- Height: 1.95 m (6 ft 5 in)

Sport
- Sport: Handball
- Position: Left back
- Current club: AEK Athens
- Number: 9

Senior clubs
- Years: Team
- 2009–2010: (Croatia) RK Split
- 2010–2012: (Croatia) HRK Karlovac
- 2012–2017: (Croatia) RK Zagreb
- 2017–2020: (Germany) Füchse Berlin
- 2020–2022: (North Macedonia) RK Eurofarm Pelister
- 2022–2024: (Greece) AEK Athens
- 2024–: (Kuwait) Burgan
National team
Years	Team	Apps	(Gls)
2013–	Croatia	42	(49)

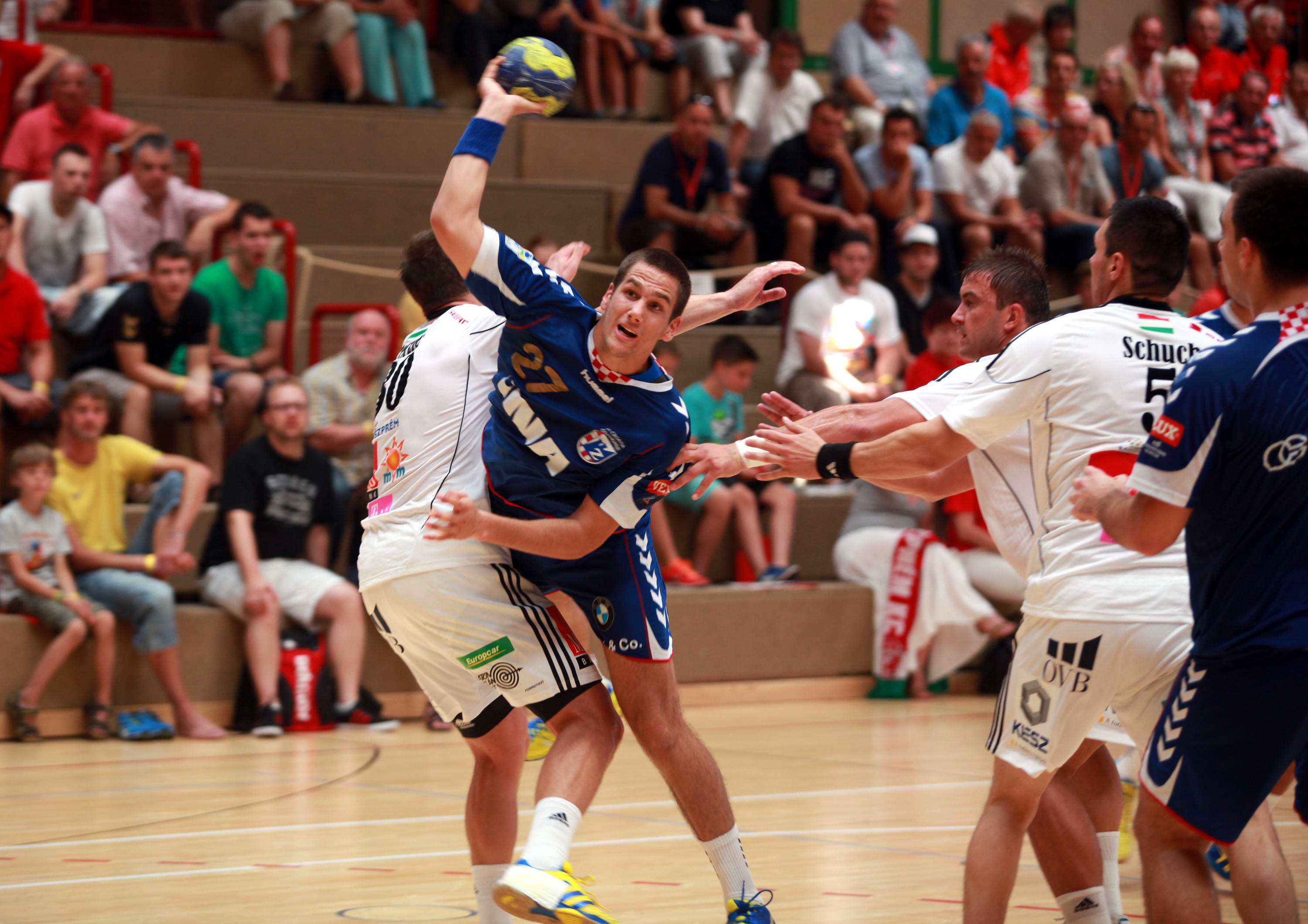
Stipe Mandalinić, on August 17th, 2012 in Ehingen (Germany), during the Sparkassen Cup (formerly known as Schlecker Cup).

Stipe Mandalinić (born 9 September 1992) is a Croatian professional handball player for AEK Athens and the Croatian national team.

== Honours ==
=== Zagreb ===
- Dukat Premier League: 2012–13, 2013–14, 2014–15, 2015–16, 2016–17
- Croatian Cup: 2013, 2014, 2015, 2016, 2017
- SEHA League: 2012-13
