= Philip Henningsson =

Swedish handball player (born 1995)

Personal information
- Nationality: Swedish
- Born: 14 June 1995 (age 31) Hörby, Sweden
- Height: 1.96 m (6 ft 5 in)

Sport
- Sport: Handball
- Position: Left back
- Current club: IFK Kristianstad

Senior clubs
- Years: Team
- 2011–2015: IFK Ystad
- 2015–2020: IFK Kristianstad
- 2015–2016: → IFK Ystad (loan)
- 2020–2021: HSG Wetzlar
- 2021–: IFK Kristianstad
National team
Years	Team	Apps	(Gls)
–	Sweden	35	(20)
Medal record
European Championship
Silver medal – second place	2018 Croatia

Philip Henningsson (born 14 June 1995) is a Swedish handball player for IFK Kristianstad and the Swedish national team.

He participated at the 2018 European Men's Handball Championship.
