= Nicolas Claire =

French handball player (born 1987)

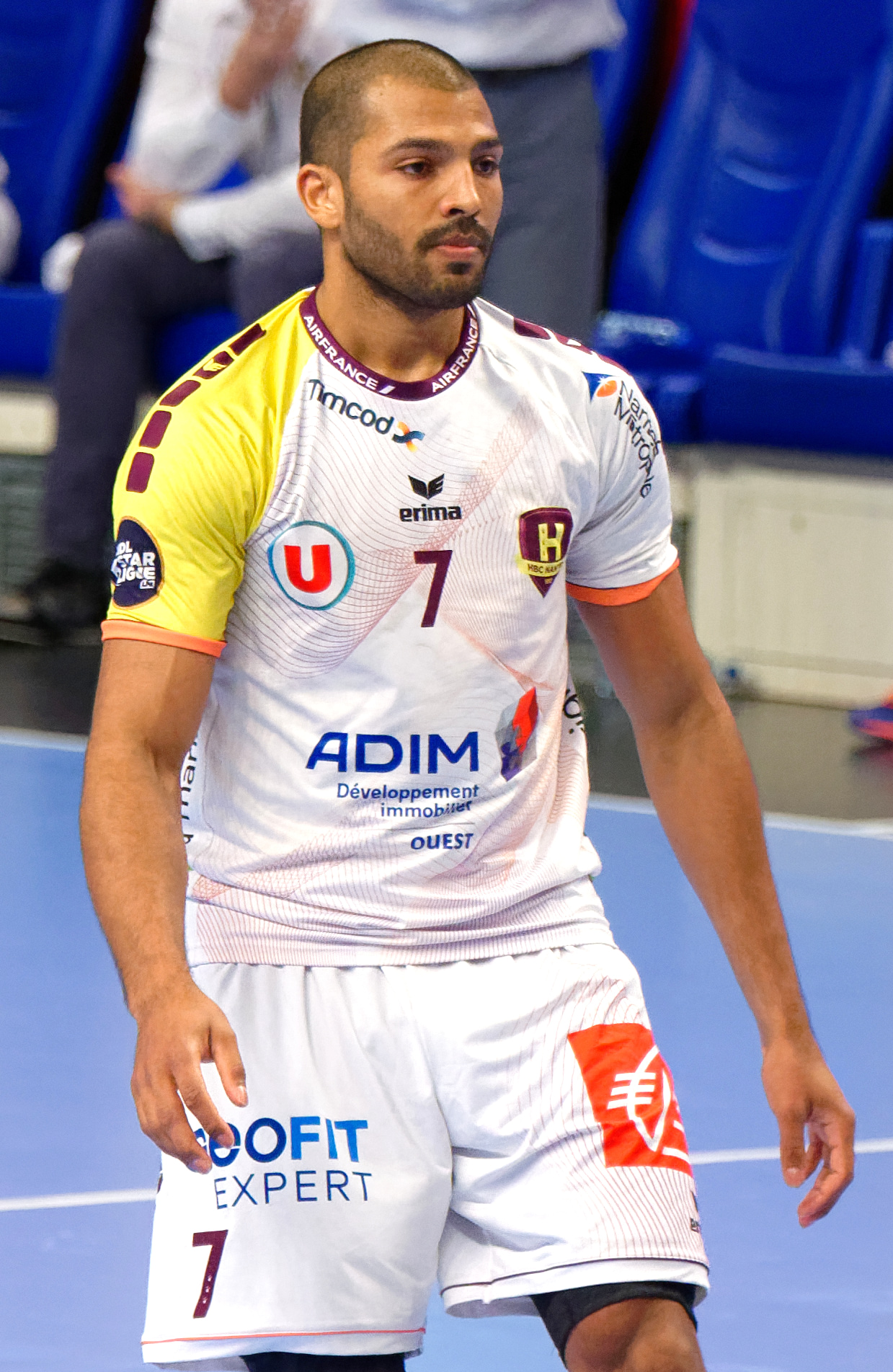
- Claire in 2017

Personal information
- Nationality: French
- Born: 10 July 1987 (age 39) Saint-Denis, Réunion
- Height: 1.90 m (6 ft 3 in)

Sport
- Sport: Handball
- Position: Centre back
- Current club: Tremblay-en-France Handball

Youth career
- Years: Team
- 1993–2004: Joinville Sports
- 2004–2005: Lasours Handball
- 2005–2008: PSG

Senior clubs
- Years: Team
- 2008–2013: PSG
- 2013–2018: HBC Nantes
- 2019–2023: Pays d'Aix UCH
- 2023–: Tremblay-en-France Handball
National team
Years	Team	Apps	(Gls)
2015–	France	54	(52)
Medal record
World Championship
Bronze medal – third place	2019 Germany/Denmark
European Championship
Bronze medal – third place	2018 Croatia
Mediterranean Games
Silver medal – second place	2009 Pescara	Team
- Updated on 10 July 2023

Nicolas Claire (born 10 July 1987) is a French handball player for Tremblay-en-France Handball and the French national team.

He was part of the French team that won the bronze medal at the 2018 European Men's Handball Championship.
