= Luka Maros =

Swiss handball player (born 1994)

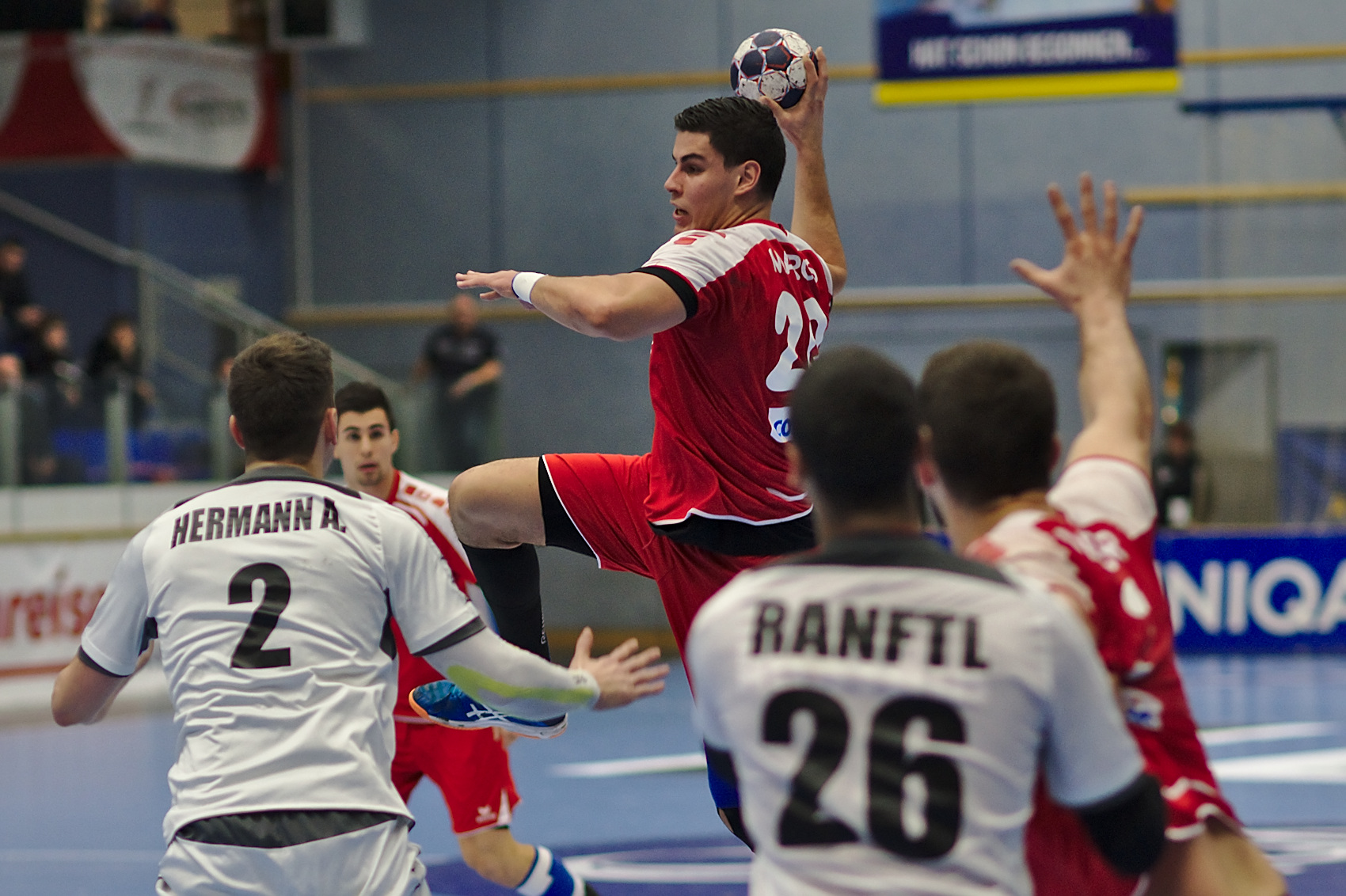

Personal information
- Nationality: Swiss
- Born: 20 March 1994 (age 32) Zürich, Switzerland
- Height: 1.96 m (6 ft 5 in)

Sport
- Sport: Handball
- Position: Left back
- Current club: Kadetten Schaffhausen
- Number: 20

Senior clubs
- Years: Team
- –2013: GC Amicitia Zürich
- 2013–2015: Pfadi Winterthur
- 2015–: Kadetten Schaffhausen
National team
Years	Team	Apps	(Gls)
2012-	Switzerland	85	(204)
- Updated on 10 August 2025

Luka Maros (born 20 March 1994) is a Swiss handball player for Kadetten Schaffhausen and the Swiss national team.

He represented Switzerland at the 2020 European Men's Handball Championship.
