= 2009–10 Andebol 1 =

Handball league season

Andebol 1
- Season: 2009–10
- Dates: St. 12 September 2009; End. 5 June 2010
- Champion: Porto; 15th title
- Relegated: Marítimo; Fafe
- Champions League: Porto
- EHF Cup: Madeira SAD
- EHF Challenge Cup: Benfica; ABC Braga; Sporting CP
- EHF Cup Winners´ Cup: Xico Andebol
- Matches played: 46
- Top goalscorer: Pedro Cruz; Águas Santas (200 goals)

The 2009–10 Andebol 1 (Portuguese: Campeonato Nacional Andebol 1) was the 59th season of Portuguese premier handball league. It ran from 12 September 2009 to 5 June 2010. Porto won their fifteenth title and the second consecutive season.

== Teams ==
The 12 teams contesting the 2009–10 Andebol 1 season were:

Team	Location	Arena
ABC Braga	Braga	Pavilhão Flávio Sá Leite
Águas Santas	Maia	Pavilhão da Associação Atlética de Águas Santas
Belenenses	Lisbon	Pavilhão Acácio Rosa
Benfica	Lisbon	Pavilhão da Luz Nº 2
Fafe	Fafe	Pavilhão Multiusos de Fafe
Horta	Horta (Azores)	Pavilhão Desportivo da Horta
Madeira SAD	Madeira	Pavilhão Gimnodesportivo do Funchal
Marítimo	Madeira	Pavilhão do Marítimo
Porto	Porto	Dragão Arena
São Bernardo	Aveiro	Gimnodesportivo de São Bernardo
Sporting CP	Lisbon	Pavilhão João Rocha
Xico Andebol	Guimarães	Pavilhão Desportivo Francisco Holanda

== League table ==
=== First group ===
Pos	Team	Pld	W	D	L	GF	GA	GD	Pts	Qualification or relegation
1	Porto	22	19	1	2	636	491	+145	61	Qualification for Champion Round
2	Benfica	22	15	2	5	609	562	+47	54	Qualification for Champion Round
3	Madeira SAD	22	14	3	5	547	512	+35	53	Qualification for Champion Round
4	ABC Braga	22	14	2	6	570	511	+59	52	Qualification for Champion Round
5	Sporting CP	22	13	2	7	619	526	+93	50	Qualification for Champion Round
6	Belenenses	22	11	5	6	608	568	+40	49	Qualification for Champion Round
7	Xico Andebol	22	9	2	11	605	613	−8	42	Qualification for Relegation Round
8	Horta	22	8	2	12	601	638	−37	40	Qualification for Relegation Round
9	São Bernardo	22	8	2	12	556	568	−12	40	Qualification for Relegation Round
10	Águas Santas	22	8	0	14	581	635	−54	38	Qualification for Relegation Round
11	Marítimo	22	1	1	20	494	661	−167	25	Qualification for Relegation Round
12	Fafe	22	0	2	20	516	657	−141	24	Qualification for Relegation Round

Source: Portuguese Handball Federation - 1A Round (in Portuguese)
Rules for classification: 1) points; 2) head-to-head points; 3) goal difference; 4) goals scored; 5) head-to-head goal difference; 6) head-to-head number of goals scored.

=== Second round ===
==== Group A - Champion ====
Pos	Team	Pld	W	D	L	GF	GA	GD	Pts	Qualification or relegation
1	Porto	10	8	0	2	293	247	+46	57	Qualification for EHF Champions League
2	Madeira SAD	10	4	1	5	236	249	−13	46	Qualification for EHF Cup
3	Benfica	10	4	0	6	249	251	−2	45	Qualification for EHF Challenge Cup
4	ABC Braga	10	4	1	5	227	247	−20	45	Qualification for EHF Challenge Cup
5	Belenenses	10	3	3	4	253	255	−2	44	
6	Sporting CP	10	4	1	5	257	266	−9	44	Qualification for EHF Challenge Cup

Source: Portuguese Handball Federation - 2A Final Round (in Portuguese)
Rules for classification: 1) points; 2) head-to-head points; 3) goal difference; 4) goals scored; 5) head-to-head goal difference; 6) head-to-head number of goals scored.

==== Group B - Relegation ====
Pos	Team	Pld	W	D	L	GF	GA	GD	Pts	Qualification or relegation
1	São Bernardo	10	6	1	3	283	269	+14	23	
2	Águas Santas	10	5	3	2	290	279	+11	23	
3	Horta	10	4	4	2	273	272	+1	22	
4	Xico Andebol	10	3	2	5	276	281	−5	18	Qualification for EHF Cup Winners´ Cup
5	Marítimo	10	3	2	5	261	277	−16	18	Relegated to Segunda Divisão
6	Fafe	10	1	4	5	255	260	−5	16	Relegated to Segunda Divisão

Source: Portuguese Handball Federation - 2B Final Round (in Portuguese)
Rules for classification: 1) points; 2) head-to-head points; 3) goal difference; 4) goals scored; 5) head-to-head goal difference; 6) head-to-head number of goals scored.

== Top three goalscorers ==
Rank	Player	Club	Goals
1	(Portugal) Pedro Cruz	Águas Santas	200
2	(Portugal) Rui Silva	Xico Andebol	189
3	(Portugal) Ricardo Moreira	Porto	181
