= 2011–12 Andebol 1 =

Handball league season

Andebol 1
- Season: 2011-2012
- Dates: St. 10 September 2011; End. 19 May 2012
- Champion: Porto; 17th title
- Relegated: ADA Maia; São Bernardo
- Champions League: Porto
- EHF Cup: Madeira SAD; Sporting CP; Benfica
- Top goalscorer: Pedro Cruz; Águas Santas (223 goals)

The 2011–12 Andebol 1 (Portuguese: Campeonato Nacional Andebol 1) was the 60th season of Portuguese premier handball league. It ran from 10 September 2011 to 19 May 2012. Porto won their seventeenth title and the fourth consecutive season.

== Teams ==
The 12 teams contesting the 2010-11 Andebol 1 season were:

Team	Location	Arena
ABC Braga	Braga	Pavilhão Flávio Sá Leite
ADA Maia	Maia	Pavilhão Municipal da Maia
Águas Santas	Maia	Pavilhão da Associação Atlética de Águas Santas
Belenenses	Lisbon	Pavilhão Acácio Rosa
Benfica	Lisbon	Pavilhão da Luz Nº 2
Fafe	Fafe	Pavilhão Multiusos de Fafe
Horta	Horta (Azores)	Pavilhão Desportivo da Horta
Madeira SAD	Madeira	Pavilhão Gimnodesportivo do Funchal
Marítimo	Madeira	Pavilhão do Marítimo
Porto	Porto	Dragão Arena
Sporting CP	Lisbon	Pavilhão João Rocha
Xico Andebol	Guimarães	Pavilhão Desportivo Francisco Holanda

== League table ==
=== First group ===
Pos	Team	Pld	W	D	L	GF	GA	GD	Pts	Qualification or relegation
1	Porto	22	20	0	2	710	530	+180	62	Qualification for Champion Round
2	Benfica	22	17	1	4	671	508	+163	57	Qualification for Champion Round
3	Águas Santas	22	15	3	4	621	564	+57	55	Qualification for Champion Round
4	Sporting CP	23	15	3	5	611	520	+91	56	Qualification for Champion Round
5	Madeira SAD	22	15	0	7	649	555	+94	52	Qualification for Champion Round
6	ABC Braga	22	10	3	9	625	632	−7	45	Qualification for Champion Round
7	Belenenses	22	7	1	14	625	632	−7	37	Qualification for Relegation Round
8	Horta	22	7	1	14	592	689	−97	37	Qualification for Relegation Round
9	Xico Andebol	22	5	1	16	539	665	−126	33	Qualification for Relegation Round
10	Fafe	22	3	1	18	539	692	−153	29	Qualification for Relegation Round
11	São Bernardo	22	2	2	18	526	593	−67	28	Qualification for Relegation Round
12	ADA Maia	22	2	1	19	542	673	−131	27	Qualification for Relegation Round

Source: Portuguese Handball Federation - 1A Round (in Portuguese)
Rules for classification: 1) points; 2) head-to-head points; 3) goal difference; 4) goals scored; 5) head-to-head goal difference; 6) head-to-head number of goals scored.

=== Second round ===
==== Group A – champion ====
Pos	Team	Pld	W	D	L	GF	GA	GD	Pts	Qualification or relegation
1	Porto	10	8	2	0	289	246	+43	59	Qualification for EHF Champions League
2	Madeira SAD	10	6	2	2	257	248	+9	50	Qualification for EHF Cup
3	Sporting CP	10	4	1	5	257	274	−17	46	Qualification for EHF Cup
4	Benfica	10	3	1	6	280	246	+34	46	Qualification for EHF Cup
5	Águas Santas	10	3	0	7	267	288	−21	44	
6	ABC Braga	10	3	0	7	240	268	−28	41	

Source: Portuguese Handball Federation - 2A Final Round (in Portuguese)
Rules for classification: 1) points; 2) head-to-head points; 3) goal difference; 4) goals scored; 5) head-to-head goal difference; 6) head-to-head number of goals scored.

==== Group B – relegation ====
Pos	Team	Pld	W	D	L	GF	GA	GD	Pts	Qualification or relegation
1	Horta	10	9	0	1	362	292	+70	47	
2	Belenenses	10	4	1	5	337	335	+2	42	
3	Xico Andebol	10	5	0	5	299	310	−11	37	
4	Fafe	10	4	2	4	304	305	−1	35	
5	ADA Maia	10	4	1	5	297	301	−4	33	Relegated to Segunda Divisão
6	São Bernardo	10	2	0	8	267	323	−56	28	Relegated to Segunda Divisão

Source: Portuguese Handball Federation - 2B Final Round (in Portuguese)
Rules for classification: 1) points; 2) head-to-head points; 3) goal difference; 4) goals scored; 5) head-to-head goal difference; 6) head-to-head number of goals scored.

== Top three goalscorers ==
Rank	Player	Club	Goals
1	(Portugal) Pedro Cruz	Águas Santas	223
2	(Portugal) Yuriy Kostetsky	Horta	215
3	(Portugal) Elledy Semedo	Belenenses	198
