= 2010–11 Andebol 1 =

Season of handball league

Andebol 1
- Season: 2010–11
- Dates: St. 11 September 2010; End. 22 May 2011
- Champion: Porto; 16th title
- Relegated: Colégio 7 Fontes; São Mamede
- Champions League: Porto
- EHF Cup: Madeira SAD
- EHF Challenge Cup: Sporting CP; Águas Santas
- EHF Cup Winners´ Cup: Benfica
- Matches played: 42
- Top goalscorer: Yuriy Kostetsky; Horta (231 goals)

The 2010–11 Andebol 1 (Portuguese: Campeonato Nacional Andebol 1) was the 60th season of Portuguese premier handball league. It ran from 11 September 2010 to 22 May 2011. Porto won their sixteenth title and the third consecutive season.

== Teams ==
The 12 teams contesting the 2010–11 Andebol 1 season were:

| Team | Location | Arena |
|---|---|---|
| ABC Braga | Braga | Pavilhão Flávio Sá Leite |
| Águas Santas | Maia | Pavilhão da Associação Atlética de Águas Santas |
| Belenenses | Lisbon | Pavilhão Acácio Rosa |
| Benfica | Lisbon | Pavilhão da Luz Nº 2 |
| Colégio 7 Fontes | Póvoa de Lanhoso | Pavilhão Industrial nas 7 Fontes |
| Horta | Horta (Azores) | Pavilhão Desportivo da Horta |
| Madeira SAD | Madeira | Pavilhão Gimnodesportivo do Funchal |
| Porto | Porto | Dragão Arena |
| São Bernardo | Aveiro | Gimnodesportivo de São Bernardo |
| São Mamede | Matosinhos | Pavilhão Eduardo Soares |
| Sporting CP | Lisbon | Pavilhão João Rocha |
| Xico Andebol | Guimarães | Pavilhão Desportivo Francisco Holanda |

== League table ==
=== First Group ===
| Pos | Team | Pld | W | D | L | GF | GA | GD | Pts | Qualification or relegation |
|---|---|---|---|---|---|---|---|---|---|---|
| 1 | Porto | 22 | 19 | 0 | 3 | 689 | 533 | +156 | 60 | Qualification for Champion Round |
| 2 | ABC Braga | 22 | 18 | 1 | 3 | 593 | 522 | +71 | 59 | Qualification for Champion Round |
| 3 | Benfica | 22 | 16 | 0 | 6 | 704 | 587 | +117 | 54 | Qualification for Champion Round |
| 4 | Madeira SAD | 22 | 16 | 0 | 6 | 587 | 537 | +50 | 54 | Qualification for Champion Round |
| 5 | Sporting CP | 22 | 13 | 1 | 8 | 568 | 531 | +37 | 49 | Qualification for Champion Round |
| 6 | Águas Santas | 22 | 12 | 0 | 10 | 560 | 531 | +29 | 46 | Qualification for Champion Round |
| 7 | Horta | 22 | 11 | 2 | 9 | 603 | 586 | +17 | 46 | Qualification for Relegation Round |
| 8 | Belenenses | 22 | 10 | 3 | 9 | 581 | 575 | +6 | 45 | Qualification for Relegation Round |
| 9 | Marítimo | 22 | 4 | 2 | 16 | 517 | 641 | −124 | 32 | Qualification for Relegation Round |
| 10 | Xico Andebol | 22 | 4 | 0 | 18 | 562 | 691 | −129 | 30 | Qualification for Relegation Round |
| 11 | São Bernardo | 22 | 2 | 1 | 19 | 536 | 637 | −101 | 27 | Qualification for Relegation Round |
| 12 | Colégio 7 Fontes (Note: M.B./Colégio 7 Fontes withdrew from the Handball Championship 1 2010/11, three days before the end of the Regular Phase. As a result, wins were awarded to Águas Santas, FC Porto and Belenenses. The club was relegated to Division II, due to his withdrawal from the Handball Championship 1 2010/11. As such, only the last classified from Group B descends to Division II, instead of the usual two.) | 22 | 0 | 2 | 20 | 450 | 598 | −148 | 24 | Relegated to Segunda Divisão |

Source: Portuguese Handball Federation - 1A Round (in Portuguese)
Rules for classification: 1) points; 2) head-to-head points; 3) goal difference; 4) goals scored; 5) head-to-head goal difference; 6) head-to-head number of goals scored.

=== Second Round ===
==== Group A - Champion ====
| Pos | Team | Pld | W | D | L | GF | GA | GD | Pts | Qualification or relegation |
|---|---|---|---|---|---|---|---|---|---|---|
| 1 | Porto | 10 | 8 | 1 | 1 | 288 | 226 | +62 | 57 | Qualification for EHF Champions League |
| 2 | Madeira SAD | 10 | 4 | 3 | 3 | 249 | 251 | −2 | 48 | Qualification for EHF Cup |
| 3 | Sporting CP | 10 | 5 | 2 | 3 | 243 | 239 | +4 | 47 | Qualification for EHF Challenge Cup |
| 4 | Benfica | 10 | 5 | 0 | 5 | 249 | 246 | +3 | 47 | Qualification for EHF Cup Winners´ Cup |
| 5 | ABC Braga (Note: Once ABC rejected the invitation to compete in the 2011/12 EHF Challenge Cup, Águas Santas took the spot.) | 10 | 3 | 1 | 6 | 593 | 522 | +71 | 47 | |
| 6 | Águas Santas | 10 | 1 | 1 | 8 | 238 | 287 | −49 | 36 | Qualification for EHF Challenge Cup |

Source: Portuguese Handball Federation - 2A Final Round (in Portuguese)
Rules for classification: 1) points; 2) head-to-head points; 3) goal difference; 4) goals scored; 5) head-to-head goal difference; 6) head-to-head number of goals scored.

==== Group B - Relegation ====
| Pos | Team | Pld | W | D | L | GF | GA | GD | Pts | Qualification or relegation |
|---|---|---|---|---|---|---|---|---|---|---|
| 1 | Horta | 8 | 5 | 1 | 2 | 249 | 227 | +22 | 42 | |
| 2 | Belenenses | 8 | 5 | 1 | 2 | 260 | 212 | +48 | 42 | |
| 3 | São Bernardo | 8 | 4 | 1 | 3 | 227 | 234 | −7 | 31 | |
| 4 | Xico Andebol | 8 | 2 | 2 | 4 | 228 | 235 | −7 | 29 | |
| 5 | São Mamede | 8 | 1 | 1 | 6 | 204 | 260 | −56 | 27 | Relegated to Segunda Divisão |

Source: Portuguese Handball Federation - 2B Final Round (in Portuguese)
Rules for classification: 1) points; 2) head-to-head points; 3) goal difference; 4) goals scored; 5) head-to-head goal difference; 6) head-to-head number of goals scored.

== Top Three Goalscorers ==
| Rank | Player | Club | Goals |
|---|---|---|---|
| 1 | (Portugal) Yuriy Kostetsky | Horta | 231 |
| 2 | (Portugal) João Paulo Pinto | São Bernardo | 220 |
| 3 | (Portugal) Elledy Semedo | Belenenses | 199 |
