= 2016–17 Andebol 1 =

Andebol 1
- Season: 2016–17
- Champions: Sporting CP (20th title)
- Relegated: Sporting da Horta; São Mamede
- EHF Champions League: Sporting CP
- EHF Cup: FC Porto; Benfica
- EHF Challenge Cup: Madeira SAD
- Matches: 268
- Goals: 14,753 (55.05 per match)
- Top goalscorer: (Portugal) Gonçalo Ribeiro (281 goals)

The 2016–17 Andebol 1 is the 65th season of the Andebol 1, Portugal's top-tier handball league. A total of fourteen teams contest this season's league, which is an increase of two teams from last season.

The season began on 3 September 2016 and ended on 18 June 2017.

ABC were the defending champions, but failed to revalidate the title, as Sporting CP won this season's league, achieving its 20th league title.

== Format ==
The competition format for the 2016–17 season consists of two phases, both played in a home-and-away double round-robin system. At the end of the first phase, the six best-ranked teams compete in Group A of the final phase to determine the champion. The remaining eight teams play in Group B, which will determine the two teams to be relegated to the Second Division.

== Teams ==
2016–17 Andebol 1 teams (Mainland)
2016–17 Andebol 1 teams (Azores)

A total of fourteen teams contest the 2016–17 Andebol 1, representing an additional two teams as compared to the previous season. Among them are all sides from the previous season, except for Passos Manuel, who relinquished their participation due to budget restrictions. The remaining three teams – Boa-Hora, Arsenal and São Mamede – were promoted from the 2015–16 Second Division.

Team	Location	Venue
ABC / U. Minho	Braga	Pavilhão Flávio Sá Leite
AA Águas Santas	Águas Santas, Maia	Pavilhão da Associação Atlética de Águas Santas
Arsenal da Devesa	Braga	Pavilhão Flávio Sá Leite
AA Avanca	Avanca, Estarreja	Pavilhão Comendador Adelino Dias Costa
Belenenses	Lisbon	Pavilhão Acácio Rosa
Benfica	Lisbon	Pavilhão da Luz Nº 2
Boa-Hora FC	Lisbon	Pavilhão Fernando Tavares
Fafe	Fafe	Pavilhão Municipal de Fafe
Madeira SAD	Funchal (Madeira)	Pavilhão Desportivo do Funchal
ADA Maia/ISMAI	Maia	Pavilhão Municipal da Maia
FC Porto	Porto	Dragão Caixa
São Mamede	Matosinhos	Pavilhão Eduardo Soares
Sporting da Horta	Horta (Azores)	Pavilhão Desportivo da Horta
Sporting CP	Lisbon	Pavilhão Municipal do Casal Vistoso / Pavilhão do Ginásio Clube do Sul

== First phase ==
=== Standings ===
Pos	Team	Pld	W	D	L	GF	GA	GD	Pts	Qualification
1	Porto	12	12	0	0	387	278	+109	36	Second phase (Group A)
2	Sporting CP	11	10	0	1	375	268	+107	31	Second phase (Group A)
3	Benfica	11	10	0	1	327	264	+63	31	Second phase (Group A)
4	Madeira SAD	12	7	0	5	351	321	+30	26	Second phase (Group A)
5	Avanca	11	6	1	4	287	284	+3	24	Second phase (Group A)
6	Boa Hora	12	5	1	6	309	369	−60	23	Second phase (Group A)
7	ABC/UMinho	9	6	0	3	299	256	+43	21	Second phase (Group B)
8	Águas Santas	11	5	0	6	271	283	−12	21	Second phase (Group B)
9	Belenenses	10	3	1	6	270	299	−29	17	Second phase (Group B)
10	Fafe	11	3	0	8	272	333	−61	17	Second phase (Group B)
11	Arsenal	11	1	2	8	292	350	−58	15	Second phase (Group B)
12	Sporting da Horta	9	2	2	5	234	260	−26	15	Second phase (Group B)
13	Maia/ISMAI	10	2	0	8	259	301	−42	14	Second phase (Group B)
14	São Mamede	12	0	1	11	268	335	−67	13	Second phase (Group B)

Updated to match(es) played on 15 November 2016. Source: Portuguese Handball Federation

=== Results ===
Home \ Away	ABC	AGU	ARS	AVA	BEL	BEN	BOA	FAF	MAD	MAI	POR	SAO	SCP	HOR
ABC			41–25				44–34			39–23	22–24		29–38	
Águas Santas					24–27	19–22	31–30		27–22			22–19		32–26
Arsenal		28–30				29–30		27–29	27–37				29–38	
Avanca		23–20	29–23					27–22		27–16	18–30		28–27	
Belenenses				29–32			27–28			30–27		28–20		29–29
Benfica	31–27			34–20	35–29		29–18		27–20					30–29
Boa-Hora			26–26	31–30						27–25	18–39	28–21	17–39	
Fafe	26–31				27–24	20–34			24–32			28–26		
Madeira	30–36			23–21			35–26			30–28	30–33	30–18		
Maia/ISMAI		24–16				27–37		34–24			23–34		32–37	
FC Porto		36–28	39–25		38–21	26–18		34–27					29–28	
São Mamede	25–30		25–25	27–31			23–26				20–25			
Sporting CP		26–22			38–25			34–22	34–26			35–18		
Sporting da Horta			26–28					30–23	20–36			27–26	18–27	

Updated to match(es) played on 15 November 2016. Source: Portuguese Handball Federation
Legend: Blue = home team win; Yellow = draw; Red = away team win.

== Final phase ==
=== Group A ===
Pos	Team	Pld	W	D	L	GF	GA	GD	Pts	Qualification
1	1st First phase	0	0	0	0	0	0	0	0	EHF Champions League
2	2nd First phase	0	0	0	0	0	0	0	0	EHF Cup (second round)
3	3rd First phase	0	0	0	0	0	0	0	0	EHF Cup (first round)
4	4th First phase	0	0	0	0	0	0	0	0	EHF Challenge Cup
5	5th First phase	0	0	0	0	0	0	0	0	
6	6th First phase	0	0	0	0	0	0	0	0	

First match(es) will be played: unknown. Source: Portuguese Handball Federation

=== Group B ===
Pos	Team	Pld	W	D	L	GF	GA	GD	Pts	Relegation
1	7th First phase	0	0	0	0	0	0	0	0	
2	8th First phase	0	0	0	0	0	0	0	0	
3	9th First phase	0	0	0	0	0	0	0	0	
4	10th First phase	0	0	0	0	0	0	0	0	
5	11th First phase	0	0	0	0	0	0	0	0	
6	12th First phase	0	0	0	0	0	0	0	0	
7	13th First phase	0	0	0	0	0	0	0	0	Second Division
8	14th First phase	0	0	0	0	0	0	0	0	Second Division

First match(es) will be played: unknown. Source: Portuguese Handball Federation
