= 2015–16 Andebol 1 =

Andebol 1
- Season: 2015–16
- Champions: ABC Braga (13th title)
- Relegated: Sporting da Horta; Fafe
- EHF Champions League: ABC Braga
- EHF Cup: Benfica; Porto
- EHF Challenge Cup: Sporting CP; Madeira SAD
- Matches: 175
- Goals: 9,878 (56.45 per match)
- Top goalscorer: (Portugal) Pedro Cruz (235 goals)

The 2015–16 Andebol 1 (also known as Fidelidade Andebol 1 for sponsorship reasons) was the 64th season of the Portuguese Handball First Division, the premier professional handball league in Portugal. A total of twelve teams contested the league, which began on 5 September 2015 and concluded on 4 June 2016.

ABC Braga beat Benfica 3–2 in the playoff finals to win their 13th national championship title, nine years after their previous triumph. Seven-time defending champions Porto were eliminated by Benfica in the semi-finals.

== Format ==
The competition format for the 2015–16 season consisted of two phases. The first phase was contested under a double round-robin system, with teams playing against each other home and away. In the second phase, the eight top-ranked teams from the first phase competed in the championship playoffs, while the remaining four teams played a mini-tournament to decide the two teams being relegated to the Second Division.

== Teams ==
2015–16 Andebol 1 teams (Mainland)
2015–16 Andebol 1 teams (Madeira)
2015–16 Andebol 1 teams (Azores)

A total of twelve teams contested the league, including ten sides from the previous season. The remaining two teams, Avanca and Fafe, were promoted from the 2014–15 Second Division, replacing the relegated sides of Santo Tirso and Xico Andebol.

Team	Location	Venue
ABC Braga	Braga	Pavilhão Flávio Sá Leite
Águas Santas	Águas Santas	Pavilhão da Associação Atlética de Águas Santas
Avanca	Estarreja	Pavilhão da Associação Atlética de Avanca
Belenenses	Lisbon	Pavilhão Acácio Rosa
Benfica	Lisbon	Pavilhão da Luz Nº 2
Fafe	Fafe	Pavilhão Municipal de Fafe
Madeira SAD	Funchal (Madeira)	Pavilhão Desportivo do Funchal
Maia/ISMAI	Maia	Pavilhão Municipal da Maia
Passos Manuel	Lisbon	Pavilhão da Escola da Quinta de Marrocos
Porto	Porto	Dragão Caixa
Sporting CP	Lisbon	Pavilhão Paz e Amizade
Sporting da Horta	Horta (Azores)	Pavilhão Desportivo da Horta

== First phase ==
=== Standings ===
Pos	Team	Pld	W	D	L	GF	GA	GD	Pts	Qualification
1	Porto	22	22	0	0	687	526	+161	66	Playoffs
2	ABC Braga	22	18	0	4	679	608	+71	58	Playoffs
3	Sporting CP	22	17	0	5	725	558	+167	56	Playoffs
4	Benfica	22	16	0	6	651	552	+99	54	Playoffs
5	Madeira SAD	22	14	1	7	641	598	+43	51	Playoffs
6	Águas Santas	22	13	0	9	572	573	−1	48	Playoffs
7	Passos Manuel	22	7	1	14	564	646	−82	37	Playoffs
8	Avanca	22	7	0	15	520	597	−77	36	Playoffs
9	Maia/ISMAI	22	5	1	16	589	661	−72	33	Relegation group
10	Belenenses	22	4	0	18	528	635	−107	30	Relegation group
11	Fafe	22	3	2	17	541	628	−87	30	Relegation group
12	Sporting da Horta	22	3	1	18	532	647	−115	29	Relegation group

Source: Portuguese Handball Federation

=== Results ===
Home \ Away	ABC	AGU	AVA	BEL	BEN	FAF	MAD	MAI	PAS	POR	SCP	HOR
ABC Braga		25–30	27–24	36–30	29–27	30–28	35–27	32–29	33–25	27–30	34–33	32–18
Águas Santas	19–23		32–25	22–21	25–24	29–28	22–29	37–32	28–29	25–30	26–28	27–25
Avanca	22–34	21–25		28–25	18–29	24–21	31–32	28–22	28–30	19–28	21–34	26–25
Belenenses	24–33	23–27	18–22		21–24	25–23	25–27	21–23	31–33	26–30	14–30	26–25
Benfica	34–28	33–27	30–19	37–23		33–27	29–23	29–22	33–28	19–23	31–32	38–27
Fafe	30–31	18–25	24–21	20–22	22–26		26–30	28–26	29–29	18–34	25–36	25–25
Madeira SAD	27–28	25–23	29–24	36–30	28–31	36–29		41–31	29–20	26–27	31–32	26–17
Maia/ISMAI	36–38	26–29	24–26	27–28	29–31	26–25	29–29		31–26	21–33	25–42	21–25
Passos Manuel	27–31	21–24	27–22	24–20	15–32	30–29	27–30	23–32		25–35	22–31	26–27
Porto	32–27	37–25	29–23	41–26	30–25	26–18	29–23	27–22	32–25		35–30	33–31
Sporting CP	31–32	29–23	32–24	33–19	31–28	38–21	28–29	39–22	35–25	26–27		40–21
Sporting da Horta	25–34	21–22	20–24	34–30	25–28	26–27	25–28	24–33	24–27	19–39	23–35	

Source: Portuguese Handball Federation
Legend: Blue = home team win; Yellow = draw; Red = away team win.

== Second phase ==
=== Playoffs ===
Quarterfinals
2	ABC Braga	36	32	–
7	Passos Manuel	28	28	–
3	Sporting CP	27	33	–
6	Águas Santas	24	24	–
1	Porto	30	30	–
8	Avanca	24	24	–
4	Benfica	26	40	–
5	Madeira SAD	25	30	–

Semifinals
2	ABC Braga	31	32	25	28	29
3	Sporting CP	32	29	30	25	28
1	Porto	31	29	27	20	–
4	Benfica	32	30	23	22	–

Finals
2	ABC Braga	40	25	27	32	32
4	Benfica	38	28	23	34	30
Third place
3	Sporting CP	26	25	–
1	Porto	27	33	–

=== 5th–8th classification ===
5th–8th-place semifinals
7	Passos Manuel	34	26	27
6	Águas Santas	33	29	34
8	Avanca	18	20	–
5	Madeira SAD	25	31	–

5th-place playoff
6	Águas Santas	29	28	25
5	Madeira SAD	28	32	28
7th-place playoff
8	Avanca	28	29	19
7	Passos Manuel	26	30	20

=== Relegation group ===
Pos	Team	Pld	W	D	L	GF	GA	GD	Pts	Relegation	MAI	BEL	HOR	FAF
1	Maia/ISMAI	6	3	1	2	164	170	−6	30		—	27–23	29–33	30–29
2	Belenenses	6	3	2	1	167	159	+8	29		31–23	—	26–24	31–29
3	Sporting da Horta	6	3	2	1	174	158	+16	29	Second Division	26–26	29–29	—	28–22
4	Fafe	6	0	1	5	161	179	−18	22	Second Division	28–29	27–27	26–34	—

Source: Portuguese Handball Federation
