= 2021–22 U20 Andebol 1 =

Handball league season

U20 Andebol 1
- Season: 2021-22
- Dates: St. 17 October 2021; End. 16 June 2022
- Champion: Águas Santas; 1st title
- Matches played: 46
- Top goalscorer: Ricardo Rocha; Águas Santas (56 goals)

The 2021–22 U20 Andebol 1 (Portuguese: Campeonato Nacional Séniores Sub-20 de Andebol 1) was the first season of Portuguese premier handball league for players under twenty years old. It ran from 17 October 2021 to 16 June 2022.

Águas Santas won its first trophies, and it becomes the first club to conquer the U20 Portuguese Handball Championship.

== Teams ==
The teams contesting the 2021–22 U20 Andebol 1 season are:

| Team | Location | Arena | Sponsors |
|---|---|---|---|
| ABC Braga | Braga | Pavilhão Flávio Sá Leite | Universidade do Minho |
| Académico de Coimbra | Coimbra | Pavilhão Eduardo Soares | Hospital da Luz |
| Académico de Porto | Porto | Pavilhão Eduardo Soares | - |
| Académico de Viseu | Viseu | Pavilhão Gimnodesportivo do Parque do Fontelo | - |
| ADA Maia | Maia | Pavilhão Municipal da Maia | Universidade da Maia (ISMAI) |
| Almada | Almada | Pavilhão Adelino Moura | - |
| Alveca | Vila Franca de Xira | Pavilhão Municipal de Vila Franca de Xira | - |
| Alto Moinho | Seixal | Pavilhão Municipal de Alto Moinho | - |
| Águas Santas | Maia | Pavilhão da Associação Atlética de Águas Santas | Milaneza |
| Avanca | Estarreja | Pavilhão Comendador Adelino Dias Costa | Bioria |
| B. E. C. A. | Celorico de Basto | Pavilhão da Escola Secundária do Celorico Basto | - |
| Belenenses | Lisbon | Pavilhão Acácio Rosa | Zumub |
| Benfica | Lisbon | Pavilhão da Luz Nº 2 | Metro Numbers |
| Boa Hora | Lisbon | Pavilhão Fernando Tavares | Inetum |
| Estrela Vigorosa | Porto | Pavilhão da Estrela Vigorosa | - |
| Feirense | Santa Maria da Feira | Pavilhão da Lavandeira | Medika |
| Gaia | Vila Nova de Gaia | Pavilhão F.C. Gaia | Empril |
| Ginásio do Sul | Setúbal | Pavilhão Ginásio Clube do Sul | - |
| Gondomar | Gondomar | Pavilhão da Escola Secundária do Rio Tinto | BetClick |
| Infesta | Vila Nova de Gaia | Pavilhão da Escola Secundária do Abel Salazar | - |
| Lamego | Lamego | Pavilhão António Magalhães | Naturdouro Viagens |
| Lusitanos | Matosinhos | Pavilhão Municipal da Santa Cruz de Bispo | - |
| Marítimo Madeira SAD | Madeira | Pavilhão do Marítimo | - |
| Padroense | Matosinhos | Pavilhão Municipal de Pedrão Légua | - |
| Pinhal Frades | Seixal | Pavilhão CSS Pinhal Frades | - |
| Porto | Porto | Dragão Arena | Betano |
| Póvoa | Póvoa de Varzim | Pavilhão Municipal da Póvoa de Varzim | Bodegão & Grupo CCR |
| 1º de Maio | Marinha Grande | Pavilhão do Marítimo | - |
| 1º de Dezembro | Oeiras | Pavilhão Noronha Feio | Queijas |
| Sanjoanense | São João da Madeira | Pavilhão Municipal das Travessas | Delba |
| Santo Tirso | Santo Tirso | Pavilhão Municipal de Santo Tirso | Retrotarget |
| São Bernardo | Aveiro | Gimnodesportivo de São Bernardo | - |
| São Paio de Oleiros | Santa Maria da Feira | Pavilhão CDC S. Paio de Oleiros | |
| São Mamede | Matosinhos | Pavilhão Eduardo Soares | - |
| Sporting CP | Lisbon | Pavilhão João Rocha | Kelly |

== League Tables ==
=== First round ===
==== Group A ====
| Pos | Team | Pld | W | D | L | GF | GA | GD | Pts | Qualification or relegation |
|---|---|---|---|---|---|---|---|---|---|---|
| 1 | Póvoa | 12 | 11 | 0 | 1 | 383 | 332 | +51 | 34 | Second round |
| 2 | ABC Braga | 12 | 8 | 1 | 3 | 342 | 276 | +66 | 29 | Second round |
| 3 | Santo Tirso | 12 | 7 | 0 | 5 | 384 | 352 | +32 | 26 | Second round |
| 4 | Águas Santas | 12 | 5 | 2 | 5 | 373 | 335 | +38 | 24 | Second round |
| 5 | ADA Maia | 12 | 4 | 2 | 6 | 353 | 325 | +28 | 22 | |
| 6 | B.E.C.A. | 12 | 4 | 1 | 7 | 328 | 344 | −16 | 21 | |
| 7 | Lusitanos | 12 | 0 | 0 | 12 | 237 | 436 | −199 | 12 | |

Source: U20 Andebol 1 - 1A Round (in Portuguese)
Rules for classification: 1) points; 2) head-to-head points; 3) goal difference; 4) goals scored; 5) head-to-head goal difference; 6) head-to-head number of goals scored.

==== Group B ====
| Pos | Team | Pld | W | D | L | GF | GA | GD | Pts | Qualification or relegation |
|---|---|---|---|---|---|---|---|---|---|---|
| 1 | Gaia | 14 | 13 | 0 | 1 | 564 | 333 | +231 | 40 | Second round |
| 2 | Porto | 14 | 13 | 0 | 1 | 515 | 357 | +158 | 40 | Second round |
| 3 | Padroense | 14 | 9 | 0 | 5 | 495 | 442 | +53 | 32 | Second round |
| 4 | Estrela Vigorosa | 14 | 7 | 1 | 6 | 435 | 403 | +32 | 29 | Second round |
| 5 | São Mamede | 14 | 5 | 1 | 8 | 429 | 441 | −12 | 25 | |
| 6 | Académico de Porto | 14 | 5 | 0 | 9 | 429 | 473 | −44 | 24 | |
| 7 | Infesta | 14 | 3 | 0 | 11 | 383 | 485 | −102 | 20 | |
| 8 | Gondomar | 14 | 0 | 0 | 14 | 314 | 630 | −316 | 14 | |

Source: U20 Andebol 1 - 1B Round (in Portuguese)
Rules for classification: 1) points; 2) head-to-head points; 3) goal difference; 4) goals scored; 5) head-to-head goal difference; 6) head-to-head number of goals scored.

==== Group C ====
| Pos | Team | Pld | W | D | L | GF | GA | GD | Pts | Qualification or relegation |
|---|---|---|---|---|---|---|---|---|---|---|
| 1 | São Bernardo | 14 | 11 | 1 | 2 | 466 | 352 | +114 | 37 | Second round |
| 2 | Lamego | 14 | 11 | 0 | 3 | 390 | 334 | +56 | 36 | Second round |
| 3 | Sanjoanense | 14 | 9 | 1 | 4 | 415 | 382 | +33 | 33 | Second round |
| 4 | Feirense | 14 | 8 | 0 | 6 | 400 | 346 | +54 | 30 | Second round |
| 5 | Académico de Viseu | 14 | 7 | 1 | 6 | 434 | 412 | +22 | 29 | |
| 6 | 1º de Maio | 14 | 4 | 2 | 8 | 351 | 390 | −39 | 24 | |
| 7 | São Paio de Oleiros | 14 | 1 | 1 | 12 | 263 | 388 | −125 | 17 | |
| 8 | Académico de Coimbra | 14 | 1 | 2 | 11 | 252 | 367 | −115 | 18 | |

Source: U20 Andebol 1 - 1C Round (in Portuguese)
Rules for classification: 1) points; 2) head-to-head points; 3) goal difference; 4) goals scored; 5) head-to-head goal difference; 6) head-to-head number of goals scored.

==== Group D ====
| Pos | Team | Pld | W | D | L | GF | GA | GD | Pts | Qualification or relegation |
|---|---|---|---|---|---|---|---|---|---|---|
| 1 | Sporting CP | 16 | 12 | 3 | 1 | 471 | 347 | +124 | 43 | Second round |
| 2 | Benfica | 16 | 12 | 2 | 2 | 486 | 328 | +158 | 42 | Second round |
| 3 | Boa Hora | 16 | 11 | 1 | 4 | 478 | 389 | +89 | 39 | Second round |
| 4 | Ginásio do Sul | 16 | 10 | 0 | 6 | 456 | 424 | +32 | 36 | Second round |
| 5 | Alto Moinho | 16 | 7 | 1 | 8 | 396 | 401 | −5 | 31 | |
| 6 | Pinhal Frades | 16 | 7 | 1 | 8 | 479 | 480 | −1 | 31 | |
| 7 | 1º de Dezembro | 16 | 5 | 1 | 10 | 355 | 388 | −33 | 27 | |
| 8 | Almada | 16 | 3 | 1 | 12 | 339 | 490 | −151 | 23 | |
| 9 | Alverca | 16 | 0 | 0 | 16 | 304 | 517 | −213 | 16 | |

Source: U20 Andebol 1 - 1D Round (in Portuguese)
Rules for classification: 1) points; 2) head-to-head points; 3) goal difference; 4) goals scored; 5) head-to-head goal difference; 6) head-to-head number of goals scored.

=== Second round ===
==== Group A ====
| Pos | Team | Pld | W | D | L | GF | GA | GD | Pts | Qualification or relegation |
|---|---|---|---|---|---|---|---|---|---|---|
| 1 | Águas Santas | 6 | 4 | 1 | 1 | 173 | 165 | +8 | 15 | Third round |
| 2 | Póvoa | 6 | 4 | 0 | 2 | 195 | 157 | +38 | 14 | |
| 3 | Porto | 6 | 3 | 1 | 2 | 174 | 148 | +26 | 13 | |
| 4 | Padroense | 6 | 0 | 0 | 6 | 167 | 239 | −72 | 6 | |

Source: U20 Andebol 1 - 2A Round (in Portuguese)
Rules for classification: 1) points; 2) head-to-head points; 3) goal difference; 4) goals scored; 5) head-to-head goal difference; 6) head-to-head number of goals scored.

==== Group B ====
| Pos | Team | Pld | W | D | L | GF | GA | GD | Pts | Qualification or relegation |
|---|---|---|---|---|---|---|---|---|---|---|
| 1 | Gaia | 6 | 6 | 0 | 0 | 216 | 173 | +43 | 18 | Third round |
| 2 | ABC Braga | 6 | 4 | 0 | 2 | 182 | 156 | +26 | 14 | |
| 3 | Estrela Vigorosa | 6 | 1 | 1 | 4 | 160 | 198 | −38 | 9 | |
| 4 | Santo Tirso | 6 | 0 | 1 | 5 | 181 | 212 | −31 | 7 | |

Source: U20 Andebol 1 - 2B Round (in Portuguese)
Rules for classification: 1) points; 2) head-to-head points; 3) goal difference; 4) goals scored; 5) head-to-head goal difference; 6) head-to-head number of goals scored.

==== Group C ====
| Pos | Team | Pld | W | D | L | GF | GA | GD | Pts | Qualification or relegation |
|---|---|---|---|---|---|---|---|---|---|---|
| 1 | Sanjoanense | 6 | 5 | 0 | 1 | 169 | 141 | +28 | 16 | Third round |
| 2 | Benfica | 6 | 4 | 0 | 2 | 148 | 140 | +8 | 14 | |
| 3 | São Bernardo | 6 | 3 | 0 | 3 | 168 | 176 | −8 | 12 | |
| 4 | Ginásio do Sul | 6 | 0 | 0 | 6 | 147 | 175 | −28 | 6 | |

Source: U20 Andebol 1 - 2C Round (in Portuguese)
Rules for classification: 1) points; 2) head-to-head points; 3) goal difference; 4) goals scored; 5) head-to-head goal difference; 6) head-to-head number of goals scored.

==== Group D ====
| Pos | Team | Pld | W | D | L | GF | GA | GD | Pts | Qualification or relegation |
|---|---|---|---|---|---|---|---|---|---|---|
| 1 | Boa Hora | 6 | 5 | 0 | 1 | 203 | 170 | +33 | 16 | Third round |
| 2 | Sporting CP | 6 | 5 | 0 | 1 | 192 | 159 | +33 | 16 | |
| 3 | Lamego | 6 | 1 | 0 | 5 | 154 | 190 | −36 | 8 | |
| 4 | Feirense | 6 | 1 | 0 | 5 | 176 | 206 | −30 | 8 | |

Source: U20 Andebol 1 - 2D Round (in Portuguese)
Rules for classification: 1) points; 2) head-to-head points; 3) goal difference; 4) goals scored; 5) head-to-head goal difference; 6) head-to-head number of goals scored.

=== Third round ===
| Pos | Team | Pld | W | D | L | GF | GA | GD | Pts | Qualification or relegation |
|---|---|---|---|---|---|---|---|---|---|---|
| 1 | Águas Santas | 6 | 4 | 0 | 2 | 187 | 179 | +8 | 14 | Champion |
| 2 | Boa Hora | 6 | 4 | 0 | 2 | 214 | 202 | +12 | 14 | |
| 3 | Gaia | 6 | 3 | 0 | 3 | 189 | 179 | +10 | 12 | |
| 4 | Sanjoanense | 6 | 1 | 0 | 5 | 157 | 187 | −30 | 8 | |

Source: U20 Andebol 1 - 3 Round (in Portuguese)
Rules for classification: 1) points; 2) head-to-head points; 3) goal difference; 4) goals scored; 5) head-to-head goal difference; 6) head-to-head number of goals scored.

== Top Three Goalscorers ==
| Rank (Note: This top three goalscorer shows only goals of the second and third round information.) | Player | Club | Goals |
|---|---|---|---|
| 1 | (Portugal) Ricardo Rocha | Águas Santas | 56 |
| 2 | (Portugal) João Costa | Padroense | 43 |
| 3 | (Portugal) Diogo Martinho | Póvoa | 38 |
