= Diogo Branquinho =

Portuguese handball player (born 1994)

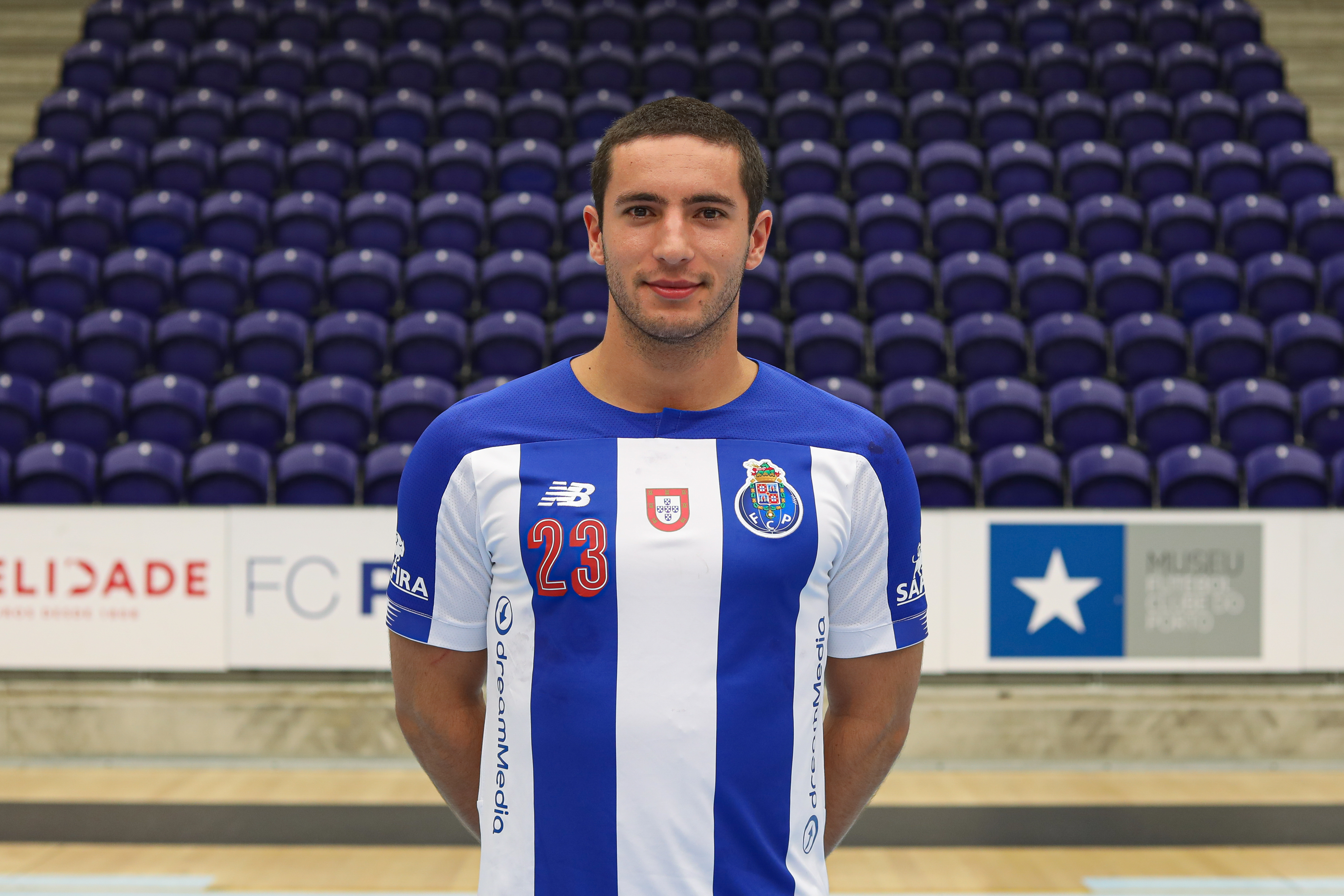

Personal information
- Full name: Diogo Ferraz Branquinho
- Nationality: Portuguese
- Born: 25 July 1994 (age 32) Aveiro, Portugal
- Height: 1.80 m (5 ft 11 in)

Sport
- Sport: Handball
- Position: Left wing
- Current club: Sporting CP
- Number: 23

Youth career
- Years: Team
- 2007–2013: São Bernardo

Senior clubs
- Years: Team
- 2012–2013: São Bernardo
- 2013–2017: ABC Braga
- 2017–2024: FC Porto
- 2024–: Sporting CP
National team
Years	Team	Apps	(Gls)
2016–	Portugal	109	(225)
- Updated on 14 January 2026

Diogo Ferraz Branquinho (pronounced [diˈoɣu βɾɐ̃ˈkiɲu]; born 25 July 1994) is a Portuguese handball player for Sporting CP and the Portuguese national team.

He represented Portugal at the 2020 European Men's Handball Championship. In 2025 he was part of the Portugal team that reached the semifinals of the World Championship for the first time in history. They lost the semifinals to Denmark and the third place playoff to France. At the 2026 European Men's Handball Championship he was part of the Portugal team that got 5th place, their best ever finish at a European Championship.

== Honours ==
ABC Braga

- Portuguese League: 2015–16
- Portuguese Cup: 2014–15, 2016–17
- Portuguese Super Cup: 2015
- EHF Challenge Cup: 2015–16

Porto

- Portuguese League: 2018–19, 2020–21, 2021–22, 2022–23
- Portuguese Cup: 2018–19, 2020–21
- Portuguese Super Cup: 2019, 2021

Sporting CP

- Portuguese Super Cup: 2024
