= 2021–22 Andebol 1 =

Handball season

Andebol 1
- Season: 2021–22
- Dates: St. 18 September 2021; End. 4 June 2022
- Champion: Porto; 23rd title
- Relegated: Horta; Sanjoanense; Xico; Boa Hora
- Champions League: Porto
- European League: Sporting CP; Benfica; Belenenses; Águas Santas
- Top goalscorer: Leonardo Abrahão (187 goals)

The 2021–22 Andebol 1 (known as the Campeonato Placard Andebol 1) was the 70th season of the Andebol 1, Portuguese premier handball league. It ram from 18 September 2021 to 4 June 2022.

Porto won their twenty-third title.

== Teams ==
Location of teams in 2021–22 Andebol 1 (Mainland)
Location of teams in 2021–22 Andebol 1 (Madeira)
Location of teams in 2021–22 Andebol 1 (Azores)

=== Arenas and locations ===
The following 16 clubs compete in the Portuguese League during the 2021–22 season:

Team	Location	Arena	Sponsors
ABC Braga	Braga	Pavilhão Flávio Sá Leite	Universidade do Minho
ADA Maia	Maia	Pavilhão Municipal da Maia	Universidade da Maia (ISMAI)
Águas Santas	Águas Santas, Maia	Pavilhão da Associação Atlética de Águas Santas	Milaneza
Avanca	Avanca, Estarreja	Pavilhão Comendador Adelino Dias Costa	Bioria
Belenenses	Lisbon	Pavilhão Acácio Rosa	Zumub
Benfica	Lisbon	Pavilhão da Luz Nº 2	Metro Numbers
Boa Hora	Lisbon	Pavilhão Fernando Tavares	Inetum
Gaia	Vila Nova de Gaia	Pavilhão F.C. Gaia	Empril
Horta	Horta (Azores)	Pavilhão Desportivo da Horta	-
Madeira SAD	Funchal (Madeira)	Pavilhão Desportivo do Funchal	Brisa
Porto	Porto	Dragão Arena	Betano
Póvoa	Póvoa de Varzim	Pavilhão Municipal da Póvoa de Varzim	Bodegão & Grupo CCR
Sanjoanense	São João da Madeira	Pavilhão Municipal das Travessas	Delba
Sporting CP	Lisbon	Pavilhão João Rocha	Kelly
Vitória de Setúbal	Setúbal	Pavilhão Antoine Velge	-
Xico	Guimarães	Pavilhão Desportivo Francisco de Holanda	-

== League table ==
Pos	Team	Pld	W	D	L	GF	GA	GD	Pts	Qualification or relegation
1	Porto (C)	30	29	0	1	1071	754	+317	88	Qualification for Champions League group phase
2	Sporting CP	30	27	1	2	1048	750	+298	85	Qualification for European League second qualifying round
3	Benfica	30	26	1	3	1024	764	+260	83	Qualification for European League group phase (Note: Benfica qualified for the European League group phase by winning the 2021–22 EHF European League.)
4	Belenenses	30	20	0	10	884	886	−2	70	Qualification for European League second qualifying round
5	Águas Santas Milaneza	30	17	0	13	814	773	+41	64	Qualification for European League first qualifying round
6	ADA Maia / ISMAI	30	15	2	13	829	811	+18	62	
7	Vitória de Setúbal	30	13	5	12	814	840	−26	61	
8	Gaia / Empril	30	13	5	12	878	921	−43	61	
9	Madeira SAD	30	13	2	15	846	867	−21	58	
10	ABC Braga	30	12	2	16	824	845	−21	56	
11	Póvoa / Bodegão / Grupo CCR	30	11	2	17	795	823	−28	54	
12	Avanca / Bioria	30	10	3	17	822	886	−64	53	
13	Sanjoanense / Delba	30	7	3	20	762	891	−129	47	Qualification for Relegation play-offs
14	Horta	30	6	3	21	729	881	−152	45	Qualification for Relegation play-offs
15	Xico (R)	30	3	2	25	738	974	−236	38	Relegated to Segunda Divisão
16	Boa Hora / Inetum (R)	30	2	1	27	735	947	−212	35	Relegated to Segunda Divisão

Source: Portuguese Handball Federation - Fase Unica (in Portuguese), Flashscore
Rules for classification: 1) points; 2) head-to-head points; 3) goal difference; 4) goals scored; 5) head-to-head goal difference; 6) head-to-head number of goals scored.
(C) Champions; (R) Relegated

== Promotion/relegation play-offs ==
The 13th and 14th-placed teams of the Andebol 1 faces the 2nd-placed team of the Segunda Divisão. The first place promoted to Andebol 1 and the last two relegated to Santo Tirso.

Pos	Team	Pld	W	D	L	GF	GA	GD	Pts	Qualification or relegation
1	Santo Tirso (P)	2	2	0	0	63	58	+5	6	Promoted to Andebol 1
2	Horta (R)	2	1	0	1	67	67	0	4	Relegated to Segunda Divisão
3	Sanjoanense / Delba (R)	2	0	0	2	57	62	−5	2	Relegated to Segunda Divisão

Source: Portuguese Handball Federation - Jogos de Apuramento (in Portuguese)
Rules for classification: 1) points; 2) head-to-head points; 3) goal difference; 4) goals scored; 5) head-to-head goal difference; 6) head-to-head number of goals scored.
(P) Promoted; (R) Relegated

== Top goalscorers ==
Rank	Player	Club	Goals
1	(Brazil) Leonardo Abrahão	Sanjoanense	187
2	(Portugal) Rúben Santos	Vitória de Setúbal	182
3	(Brazil) Vinícios Carvalho	ABC Braga	178
4	(Portugal) Daniel Vieira	Avanca	160
5	(Portugal) Francisco Costa	Sporting CP	160

== See also ==
- 2021–22 Taça de Portugal
