= List of indoor arenas in Portugal =

The following is a list of indoor arenas in Portugal (ordered by capacity) with a minimum required capacity of 1,000. The venues are by their final capacity after construction for seating-only events. There is more capacity if standing room is included (e.g. for concerts).

== Current arenas ==
Image	Arena	Seating	Standing	City	Team	Inaugurated
	MEO Arena	12,500	20,100	Lisbon	None	1998
	Europarque	10,000		Santa Maria da Feira	None	1995
	Multiusos de Guimarães	7,603	10,000	Guimarães	None	2001
	Sagres Campo Pequeno	6,848	9,269	Lisbon	Bullfighting; Concert	1892
	Coliseu Comendador Rondão Almeida - Coliseu de Elvas	6,500	7,500	Elvas	Bullfighting; Concert	2006
	Forum Braga	6,000	12,000	Braga	None	1981/2017
	Nave Polivalente de Espinho	6,000	12,000	Espinho	S.C. Espinho (volleyball); (handball)	1996
	Pavilhão Municipal das Travessas	6,000				1995
	Super Bock Arena	5,500	8,000	Porto	None	1954
	Arena d´Évora	5,000		Évora	Bullfighting; Concert	1889/2007
	Multiusos de Gondomar	4,800	8,400	Gondomar	None	2007
	Pavilhão Dr. Salvador Machado	4,000		Oliveira de Azeméis	U.D. Oliveirense (basketball); (roller hockey)	1986
	Portimão Arena	3,000	8,000	Portimão	None	2006
	Arena de Ovar	3,000	6,000	Ovar	Ovarense Basquetebol	2007
	Viseu Arena	3,000	5,500	Viseu	None	2003
	Coliseu Porto Ageas	3,000	4,000	Porto	None	1908
	Póvoa Arena	3,000	-	Póvoa de Varzim	None	2024
	Coliseu dos Recreios	2,846	5,672	Lisbon	None	1890
	Pavilhão João Rocha	3,001		Lisbon	Sporting CP (basketball); (futsal); (handball); (roller hockey); (volleyball)	2017
	Centro de Congressos de Lisboa	2,500		Lisbon	None	1957
	Pavilhão Desportivo Unidade Vimaranense	2,500		Guimarães	Vitória de Guimarães (basketball); (volleyball); (handball)	1997
	Pavilhão Desportivo Municipal da Póvoa de Varzim	2,500		Póvoa de Varzim	Póvoa A.C.	1998
	Pavilhão Fidelidade	2,456		Lisbon	Benfica (basketball) (futsal); (roller hockey)	2003
	Panorama – Pavilhão Multiusos de Alcobaça	2,280	5,300	Alcobaça	None	2025
	Pavilhão Multidesportos Dr. Mário Mexia	2,239		Coimbra	Académica de Coimbra (basketball)	2003
	Dragão Arena	2,179		Porto	FC Porto (basketball); (handball); (roller hockey)	2009
	Centro Cultural de Viana do Castelo	2,000	2,700	Viana do Castelo	None	2013
	Pavilhão da Luz Nº 2	1,800		Lisbon	Benfica (handball); Benfica (volleyball)	2003
	Casa da Música (Sala Suggia)	1,238		Porto	Concert	2005

== Proposed ==
Arena	Capacity	Opening	Location
Centro de Dinamização Empresarial, Cultural e Desportiva de Castelo Branco	10,000	TBD	Castelo Branco
Pavilhão Multiusos de Portalegre	5,000	TBD	Portalegre
Barcelos Arena	3,500	TBD	Barcelos
Pavilhão Multiusos de Monção	3,000	TBD	Monção

== See also ==
- List of indoor arenas in Europe
- List of indoor arenas by capacity
- Lists of stadiums
