= 2014–15 Andebol 1 =

2014–15 Andebol 1 was the 63rd season of the Portuguese Handball First Division.

== Regular season ==
=== Standings ===
	Team	Pld	W	D	L	GF	GA	Diff	Pts
1	FC Porto	15	15	0	0	466	344	+122	45
2	Liberty Seguros-ABC Uminho	15	12	1	2	480	383	+97	40
3	Sporting CP	15	11	2	2	471	384	+87	39
4	SL Benfica	14	10	1	3	428	353	+75	35
5	Águas Santas Mileza	15	6	2	7	403	382	+75	29
6	AM Madeira SAD	15	5	4	6	377	390	−13	29
7	SC Horta	15	6	1	8	415	434	−19	28
8	DELTA Belenenses	15	5	1	9	371	421	−50	26
9	NAAL Passos Manuel	15	5	1	9	422	461	−39	26
10	ADA Maia-ISMAI	0	0	0	0	0	0	0	0
5	AC Fafe	0	0	0	0	0	0	0	0
6	AA Avanca	0	0	0	0	0	0	0	0

Championship Round
Relegation Round

Pld - Played; W - Won; L - Lost; GF - Goals for; GA - Goals against; Diff - Difference; Pts - Points.

== Number of teams by Region ==
#	Regions of Portugal	No. teams	Teams
1	Norte	5	FC Porto, ABC Braga, AC Fafe, Águas Santas, ADA Maia-ISMAI
2	Lisbon	4	SL Benfica, Sporting CP, DELTA Belenenses and NAAL Passos Manuel
3	Centro	1	AA Avanca
4	Madeira Island	1	Madeira SAD
5	Açores Island	1	SC Horta
