= Divisão de Elite =

In 2002, due to disputes with the Portuguese League Association, the Federation refused to consider the League Champion as National Champion. So, the Portuguese Handball Federation reformulated the competitions, creating Divisão de Elite and considering is champion, National Champion, although being the second handball league in Portugal. The worsts are relegated to Portuguese Handball Second Division (renamed First Division during that period). Teams could only get to Liga Portuguesa de Andebol by candidature, because LPA was a closed league.

The best and most important Portuguese handball teams compete in Portuguese League with exception of Sporting CP which compete in Divisão de Elite

In the end of season 2005-06, with the ending of the dispute between league and Federation was extinct Divisão de Elite.

== Portuguese Divisão Elite Champions ==
| Year | Final Standings |
| Year | Champion | Second Place | Third Place |
|---|---|---|---|
| 2001/2002 | FC Porto |
| 2002/2003 | São Bernardo |
| 2003/2004 | São Bernardo |
| 2004/2005 | Sporting CP |
| 2005/2006 | Sporting CP |
