= Portuguese Handball Fourth Division =

Portuguese handball league

Portuguese Handball Fourth Division or "4a Divisão Portuguesa" was the fourth handball league in Portugal in a few seasons Due to some disputes between the League and the Federation, between 2001 and 2009 the competition was restored under the designation of Portuguese Handball Third Division. With the ending of the League, and new restructuring of Portuguese Competitions, Fourth Division was again extinct.

== Portuguese 4th Division Champions ==
| Year | Final Standings |
| Year | Champion | Second Place | Third Place |
|---|---|---|---|
| 1982/1983 | Boa Hora |
| 1983/1984 | GD TAP |
| 1984/1985 | Imp. Cruzeiro |
| 1985/1986 | Ac. Fátima |
| 2001/2002 | Sanjoanense |
| 2002/2003 | IFC Torrense |
| 2003/2004 | AS Académico Leiria |
| 2004/2005 | AA Avanca |
| 2005/2006 | CF Empregados do Comércio |
| 2006/2007 | CDE Camões |
| 2007/2008 | Alto Moinhos | Gondomar Cultural | CA Leça & GDR Quinta Nova |
| 2008/2009 | CD Paço de Arcos | CD Lousanense | Estarreja AC & Vitória F.C. (handball) |
