= 2012–13 Liga Portuguesa de Andebol =

2012–13 Ligza Portuguesa de Andebol was the 11th season of the premier Portuguese handball league, the Portuguese Handball First Division (Liga Portuguesa de Andebol). FC Porto were the champions for the year.

== Results ==
- Sporting CP 32 - 22 Avanca
- Benfica 29 - 22 ABC/UMinho
- Xico Andebol 30 - 27 Fafe
- Madeira SAD 30 - 28 Belenenses
- Sporting da Horta 27 - 26 Águas Santas
- CDE Camões 21 - 37 FC Porto
