= Portuguese Handball Super Cup =

- Founded: 1982
- No. of teams: 4
- Country: Portugal
- Confederation: EHF
- Most recent champion: Sporting CP (7th title)
- Most titles: FC Porto (8 titles)
- Broadcaster: FAP TV
- Website: FP Andebol

Portuguese Handball Super Cup (Portuguese: Supertaça de Portugal de Andebol) is a professional handball competition played between the winners of the Liga Portuguesa de Andebol and the winners of the Cup, or against the finalist of the Cup if the same team win both competitions.

In the 2021 to 2024 seasons, it was played by the top 4 teams in the Liga Portuguesa de Andebol of the previous year. From 2025 onwards it returned to a single format of the league winners and winners/runners up of the Portuguese cup.

Sporting CP are current holders of the competition winning the 2026 edition and a record 4th straight championship.

== Winners ==
=== Two-team format ===
Year	Winner	Score	Runner-up	Ref.
1983	Belenenses		Benfica	
Not disputed (1984 to 1988)
1989	Benfica	67–60 (Note: Aggregate. The two-legged final ended with a tie after two disputed matches. Results: 24–24 (1st leg), 19–19 (2nd leg) and 24–17 (tiebreaker).)	Sporting CP	
1990	ABC Braga		Benfica	
1991	ABC Braga		Benfica	
1992	ABC Braga		Sporting CP	
1993	Benfica		ABC Braga	
1994	FC Porto		Belenenses	
1995	ABC Braga			
Not disputed (1996)
1997	Sporting CP		ABC Braga	
1998	ABC Braga		Sporting CP	
1999	FC Porto	25–23	Madeira SAD	
2000	FC Porto	28–25	ABC Braga	
2001	Sporting CP	18–16	FC Porto	
2002	FC Porto	31–28	Águas Santas	
Not disputed (2003 to 2008)
2009	FC Porto	29–28 aet	Belenenses	
2010	Benfica	28–20	Águas Santas	
Not disputed (2011)
2012	Benfica	29–26	Sporting CP	
2013	Sporting CP	33–32 aet	FC Porto	
2014	FC Porto	29–28	Sporting CP	
2015	ABC Braga	26–24	FC Porto	
2016	Benfica	25–24	ABC Braga	
2017	ABC Braga	26–21	Sporting CP	
2018	Benfica	29–24	Sporting CP	
2019	FC Porto	28–22	Águas Santas	
Not disputed (2020)				(Note: This competition was canceled due to the coronavirus pandemic.)

=== Four-team format ===
Year	Final	Semi-finals	Ref.
2021	09-12-2021 / FC Porto / 34–29 / Sporting CP / Lisbon; / Nikola Mitrevski 0'; S. Frandsen 0'; Diogo Oliveira 0'; Rui Silva 3'; Leonel Fernandes 2'; Diogo Branquinho 1'; António Areia 2'; Miguel Alves 5'; Victor Iturriza 6'; Daymaro Salina 4'; Pedro Valdés 5'; Pedro Cruz 1'; Djibril M´Bengue 2'; Ivan Sliskovic 3'; Diogo Silva 0'; Fábio Magalhães 0'; Magnus Andersson (coach) / / Matevz Skok 0'; Manuel Gaspar 0'; Yassine Belkaid 0'; Natán Suárez 6'; André José 2'; Carlos Ruesga 0'; M. Gassama 1'; Francisco Tavares 5'; Duarte Seixas 0'; Josep Folqués 2'; Jonas Tidemand 2'; Erekle Arsenashvili 2'; Edmilson Araújo 3'; Francisco Costa 3'; Salvador Salvador 1'; Jens Schongarth 2'; Ricardo Costa (Coach) / Stadium: Pavilhão da Luz; Nº 2 Referee: Mário Coutinho; Ramiro Silva	09-11-2021 / Sporting CP / 35–30 / Águas Santas / Lisbon; / Matevz Skok 0'; Manuel Gaspar 0'; Yassine Belkaid 0'; Natán Suárez 2'; André José 0'; Carlos Ruesga 4'; M. Gassama 8'; Francisco Tavares 2'; Duarte Seixas 0'; Josep Folqués 2'; Jonas Tidemand 1'; Erekle Arsenashvili 0'; Edmilson Araújo 2'; Francisco Costa 8'; Salvador Salvador 4'; Jens Schongarth 2'; Ricardo Costa (Coach) / / António Campos 0'; A. Magalhães 0'; André Sousa 7'; Pedro Seabra 4'; Miguel Neves 1'; Fábio Teixeira 3'; Ricardo Mourão 1'; Francisco Coelho 0'; Miguel Pinto 3'; Carlos Santos 0'; Francisco Fontes 3'; Vasco Santos 0'; José Barbosa 0'; Rúben Ribeiro 3'; João Gomes 5'; Miguel Baptista 0'; Ricardo Moreira (coach) / Stadium: Pavilhão da Luz; Nº 2 Referee: Duarte Santos; Ricardo Fonseca; 09-11-2021 / Benfica / 24–29 / FC Porto / Lisbon; / G. Capdeville 0'; Lazar Kukic 3'; Jonas Kallman 3'; Ole Rahmel 3'; Alexis Borges 1'; Rogério Moraes 2'; Demis Grigoras 4'; Sergey Hernández 0'; Bélone Moreira 2'; Mahamadou Keita 1'; Carlos Martins 0'; Paulo Moreno 0'; Arnau García 0'; Tadej Kljun 0'; Luciano Silva 0'; Petar Djordjic 5'; Chema Rodríguez (coach) / / Nikola Mitrevski 0'; S. Frandsen 0'; Diogo Oliveira 0'; Rui Silva 1'; Leonel Fernandes 2'; Diogo Branquinho 1'; António Areia 3'; Miguel Alves 4'; Victor Iturriza 3'; Daymaro Salina 2'; Pedro Valdés 0'; Pedro Cruz 0'; Djibril M´Bengue 1'; Ivan Sliskovic 4'; Diogo Silva 3'; Fábio Magalhães 5'; Magnus Andersson (coach) / Stadium: Pavilhão da Luz; Nº 2 Referee: Daniel Martins; Roberto Martins	
2022	09-11-2022 / Benfica / 45–43 (aet) / Sporting CP / Serpa; / Adam Juhasz 9'; Jonas Kallman 5'; Belone Moreira 5'; Paulo Moreno 2'; Carlos Martins 0'; Alexis Borges 3'; Ole Rahmel 9'; Ander Izquierdo 0'; Sergey Ferrer 0'; Fred Bingo 2'; Leandro Semedo 1'; Demis Grigoras 2'; Jose Silva 0'; G. Capdeville 0'; Petar Djordjic 7'; Vladimir Vranjes 0'; Leandro Alves (coach) / Report / Edney Oliveira 1'; Edmilson Araujo 1'; Francisco Costa 10'; Natan Diaz 4'; Jonas Tidemand 0'; Patryk Walczak 1'; Carlos Pasarin 1'; Salvador 4'; M. Cissokho 1'; Francisco Tavares 5'; Manuel Gaspar 3'; Jens Schongarth 0'; Etienne Mocquais 1'; Leonel Maciel 0'; Josep Ortiz 3'; Martim Costa 0'; Carlos Carneiro (coach) / Stadium: Pavilhão; Municipal; Carlos; Pinhão; Referee: Duarte Santos; Ricardo Fonseca	09-10-2022 / Benfica / 37–36 (aet) / FC Porto / Serpa; / Sergey Hernández 1'; G. Capdeville 0'; Ádám Juhász 2'; Bélone Moreira 2'; Ander Izquierdo 1'; Jonas Kallman 3'; Carlos Martins 1'; Ole Rahmel 12'; Arnaud Bingo 0'; Paulo Moreno 4'; Alexis Borges 1'; Vladimir Vranjes 0'; Leandro Semedo 0'; Demis Grigoras 2'; Luciano Silva 0'; Petar Djordjic 8'; Chema Rodríguez (coach) / / Nikola Mitrevski 0'; S. Frandsen 0'; André Sousa 0'; Rui Silva 3'; António Areia 3'; Leonel Fernandes 2'; Diogo Branquinho 3'; Miguel Alves 4'; Daymaro Salina 5'; Ignacio Plaza 0'; Pedro Valdés 0'; Jakob Mikkelsen 2'; Pedro Cruz 3'; Nikolaj Laeso 5'; Jack Thurin 2'; Fábio Magalhães 4'; Magnus Andersson (coach) / Stadium: Pavilhão; Municipal; Carlos; Pinhão; Referee: Daniel Martins; Roberto Martins; 09-10-2022 / Belenenses / 24–38 / Sporting CP / Serpa; / Tiago Silva 0'; Miguel Moreira 0'; Tiago Pereira 0'; Rui Barreto 0'; Gonçalo Soares 0'; Tomás Ferreira 0'; Diogo Miranda 0'; Gonçalo Nogueira 3'; Nélson Pina 6'; Tiago Ferro 1'; Bruno Moreira 2'; Uros Markovic 0'; Christopher Selles 0'; Diogo Domingos 0'; Edvaldo Ferreira 9'; Pedro Santana 3'; Carlos Jorge (coach) / Report / Manuel Gaspar 0'; Leonel Maciel 0'; Natán Suárez 3'; Carlos Ruesga 1'; M. Gassama 6'; Francisco Tavares 2'; Étienne Mocquais 1'; Josep Folqués 6'; Edy Silva 0'; Jonas Tidemand 1'; Patryk Walczak 1'; Edmilson Araújo 1'; Francisco Costa 7'; Salvador Salvador 4'; Jens Schongarth 1'; Martim Costa 4'; Ricardo Costa (coach) / Stadium: Pavilhão; Municipal; Carlos; Pinhão; Referee: Ruben Maia; André Nunes	

== Performance by club ==
Club	Winners	Runners-up	Years won	Years runner-up
FC Porto	8	4	1994, 1999, 2000, 2002, 2009, 2014, 2019, 2021	2001, 2013, 2015, 2025
ABC Braga	7	4	1990, 1991, 1992, 1995, 1998, 2015, 2017	1993, 1997, 2000, 2016
Benfica	7	6	1989, 1993, 2010, 2012, 2016, 2018, 2022	1983, 1990, 1991, 2023, 2024, 2026
Sporting CP	7	9	1997, 2001, 2013, 2023, 2024, 2025, 2026	1989, 1992, 1998, 2012, 2014, 2017, 2018, 2021,2022
Belenenses	1	2	1983	1994, 2009
Águas Santas	0	3	—	2002, 2010, 2019
Madeira SAD	0	1	—	1999

== See also ==
Men's

- Andebol 1
- Second Division
- Third Division
- Taça de Portugal
- Youth Honors

Women's

- First Division
- Taça de Portugal
- Supertaça
- Youth Honors (Women)
