= São Bernardo (parish) =

Civil parish in Portugal

- Civil parish
- Location in Portugal
- Coordinates: 40.615°N 8.622°W
- Country: Portugal
- Region: Centro
- Intermunic. comm.: Região de Aveiro
- District: Aveiro
- Municipality: Aveiro

Area
  - Total: 3.94 km^{2} (1.52 sq mi)

Population (2011)
  - Total: 4,960
  - Density: 1,300/km^{2} (3,300/sq mi)
- Time zone: UTC+00:00 (WET)
  - Summer (DST): UTC+01:00 (WEST)

São Bernardo is a civil parish in Aveiro Municipality, Aveiro District, Portugal. The population in 2011 was 4,960, in an area of 3.94 km^{2}.

== Sport ==
The handball club São Bernardo, which has participated several times in the first level national championship is located in this town.
