= Portuguese Handball Cup =

Handball league

- Founded: 1971
- Country: Portugal
- Confederation: Europe (EHF)
- Number of clubs: 64
- Current champions: Sporting CP (20th title)
- Most championships: Sporting CP (20 titles)
- Broadcaster(s): RTP2, Sport TV, A Bola TV, FAP TV
- Website: FPA.pt
- Current: 2023–24

The Portuguese Handball Cup (Portuguese: Taça de Portugal de Andebol) is a handball competition played in the Swiss system and eligible for all professional and amateur teams in Portugal.

The most successful club in the competition is Sporting CP with 20 trophies. They are the current title holders winning their fifth straight title, after defeating Benfica in the final 2026.

== Winners ==
=== Taça Nacional de Andebol Português Portuguese National Handball Cup ===
- 1971–72: Sporting CP
- 1972–73: Sporting CP (2)
- 1973–74: Belenenses
- 1974–75: Sporting CP (3)
- 1975–76: FC Porto
- 1976–77: FC Porto (2)
- 1977–78: Belenenses (2)
- 1978–79: FC Porto (3)
- 1979–80: FC Porto (4)
- 1980–81: Sporting CP (4)
- 1981–82: Belenenses (3)
- 1982–83: Sporting CP (5)
- 1983–84: Belenenses (4)
- 1984–85: Benfica
- 1985–86: Benfica (2)
- 1986–87: Benfica (3)
- 1987–88: Sporting CP (6)
- 1988–89: Sporting CP (7)
- 1989–90: ABC
- 1990–91: ABC (2)
- 1991–92: ABC (3)
- 1992–93: ABC (4)
- 1993–94: FC Porto (5)
- 1994–95: ABC (5)
- 1995–96: ABC (6)
- 1996–97: ABC (7)
- 1997–98: Sporting CP (8)
- 1998–99: Madeira SAD
- 1999–2000: ABC (8)
- 2000–01: Sporting CP (9)
- 2001–02: Águas Santas
- 2002–03: Sporting CP (10)
- 2003–04: Sporting CP (11)
- 2004–05: Sporting CP (12)
- 2005–06: FC Porto (6)
- 2006–07: FC Porto (7)
- 2007–08: ABC Braga (9)
- 2008–09: ABC Braga (10)

=== Taça de Portugal de Andebol ===
==== Portuguese Handball Cup ====
Year	Winner	Score	Runner-Up	Semi-Final Losers		Ref.
2009–10	Xico Andebol (1)	27–24	Sporting CP	SC Horta	São Bernardo	
2010–11	Benfica (4)	29–25	Madeira SAD	FC Porto	Belenenses	
2011–12	Sporting CP (13)	26–25	FC Porto	Belenenses	Madeira SAD	
2012–13	Sporting CP (14)	30–28	FC Porto	Benfica	Águas Santas	
2013–14	Sporting CP (15)	34–29	ABC Braga	Xico Andebol	Benfica	
2014–15	ABC Braga (11)	25–24	FC Porto	Sporting CP	Benfica	
2015–16	Benfica (5)	36–35	Sporting CP	Madeira SAD	FC Porto	
2016–17	ABC Braga (12)	35–33 (a.e.t.)	Sporting CP	Avanca	FC Porto	
2017–18	Benfica (6)	31–24	Sporting CP	FC Gaia	FC Porto	
2018–19	FC Porto (8)	31–30	Águas Santas	Madeira SAD	Póvoa AC	
2019–20	This competition was not completed due to the coronavirus pandemic.					
2020–21	FC Porto (9)	31–27	Benfica	Sporting CP	Águas Santas	
2021–22	Sporting CP (16)	36–35 (a.e.t.)	FC Porto	Benfica	Madeira SAD	
2022–23	Sporting CP (17)	30–29	Marítimo Madeira SAD	FC Porto	Póvoa AC	
2023–24	Sporting CP (18)	34–30	FC Porto	Belenenses	Póvoa AC	
2024–25	Sporting CP (19)	28–27	FC Porto	ABC Braga	Avanca	
2025–26	Sporting CP (20)	41–39 (a.e.t.)	Benfica	Madeira SAD	Águas Santas	

== Titles by club ==
Club	Wins	Years won
Sporting CP	20	1972, 1973, 1975, 1981, 1983, 1988, 1989, 1998, 2001, 2003, 2004, 2005, 2012, 2013, 2014, 2022, 2023, 2024, 2025, 2026
ABC	12	1990, 1991, 1992, 1993, 1995, 1996, 1997, 2000, 2008, 2009, 2015, 2017
FC Porto	9	1976, 1977, 1979, 1980, 1994, 2006, 2007, 2019, 2021
Benfica	6	1985, 1986, 1987, 2011, 2016, 2018
Belenenses	4	1974, 1978, 1982, 1984
Madeira SAD	1	1999
Águas Santas	1	2002
Xico Andebol	1	2010

== See also ==
Men's

- Andebol 1
- Second Division
- Third Division
- Supertaça
- Youth Honors

Women's

- First Division
- Taça de Portugal
- Supertaça
- Youth Honors (Women)
