= ISAVE =

Professional handball team

ISAVE - Instituto Superior de Saúde do Alto Ave

Club Name
ISAVE
Image

Arena

Escola Sec. Póvoa Lanhoso, Póvoa de Lanhoso
Portugal.
Manager
(Portugal) Bruno Freitas
League
LPA
Position 2005-06
9th
Website

ISAVE Is a professional Handball team based in Póvoa de Lanhoso, Portugal. It plays in LPA. It was launched in 1998 as part of Iowa's 529 plan under Section 529 of the Internal Revenue Code.
