= Portuguese Handball Second Division =

Segunda Divisão
- Current season, competition or edition: 2024–25 Andebol 2
- Founded: 1966; 60 years ago
- No. of teams: 30
- Country: Portugal
- Confederation: European Handball Federation (EHF)
- Most recent champion: Arsenal de Devesa (2023–24)
- Most titles: Almada AC (5)
- Level on pyramid: 3
- Promotion to: Andebol 1
- Relegation to: Third Division
- Website: www.fpa.pt

Campeonato Nacional de Seniores Masculinos, Segunda Divisão (in English, Men's Senior National Championship, 2nd Division), just Segunda Divisão, is the second-tier handball league in Portugal. The best teams get promoted to Andebol 1, and the worst are relegated to the Portuguese Handball Third Division.

Almada AC is the most successful club, having won the competition four times.

The competition is played over two phases by 30 teams, initially geographically grouped into three zone groups.

The current champions are Arsenal de Devesa, from Braga.

== History ==
The second tier was established in 1966 as a result of the need for the expansion of national handball competitions due to the increase in the number of participating teams in regional championships. The competition was created under its current name for the 1966–67 season and ran for only four consecutive seasons, as in 1970–71 it was abolished. However, the competition returned the following year.

In 1982, a new top-division league (Divisão de Honra) was created, and the Segunda Divisão became the 3rd tier of Portuguese handball. Nevertheless, with the creation of the new single round-robin league in 1985, the Second Division returned to be the 2nd-tier competition.

In 2001, another rebranding of the top division led to the Segunda Divisão becoming once again the 3rd tier of Portuguese handball. Moreover, due to the League-Federation dispute, the competition took an even lower standard between 2002 and 2007. During that period, the Segunda Divisão was de facto the 4th tier of the league system, although considered de jure the 3rd tier by the Portuguese Handball Federation.

As the dispute ended, the Segunda Divisão became de facto the 3rd tier of Portuguese handball in 2007.

As the Liga Portuguesa de Clubes de Andebol folded in 2008, the Segunda Divisão has been the level 2 league of Portuguese handball since the 2009–2010 season.

== Champions ==
=== Portuguese handball second division ===
- 1966/1967: Campo de Ourique (1)
- 1967/1968: Almada AC (1)
- 1968/1969: Almada AC (2)
- 1969/1970: Almada AC (3)
- 1970/1971: Not Played
- 1971/1972: Atlético Clube de Portugal (1)
- 1972/1973: B. Espírito Santo (1)
- 1973/1974: Beira-Mar (1)
- 1974/1975: São Mamede (1)
- 1975/1976: FC Maia (1)
- 1976/1977: Caramão (1)
- 1977/1978: Sporting de Espinho (1)
- 1978/1979: Encarnação (1)
- 1979/1980: Caselas FC (1)
- 1980/1981: Vitória FC (1)
- 1981/1982: AD Sanjoanense (1)
- 1982/1983: ABC (1) (3rd tier)
- 1983/1984: São Bernardo (1) (3rd tier)
- 1984/1985: Francisco de Holanda (1) (3rd tier)
- 1985/1986: GD TAP (1)
- 1986/1987: Francisco de Holanda (1)
- 1987/1988: Académica de Coimbra (1)
- 1988/1989: Boavista (1)
- 1989/1990: Illiabum (1)
- 1990/1991: GD TAP (2)
- 1991/1992: CCD Coelima (1)
- 1992/1993: AD Fafe (1)
- 1993/1994: São Mamede (2)
- 1994/1995: Almada AC (4)
- 1995/1996: Académico do Funchal (1)
- 1996/1997: Almada AC (5)
- 1997/1998: São Bernardo (2)
- 1998/1999: Águas Santas (1)
- 1999/2000: FC Gaia (1)
- 2000/2001: CCR Alto do Moinho (1)
- 2001/2002: Juve Lis (1) (3rd tier)
- 2002/2003: IFC Torreense (1) (3rd/4th tier)
- 2003/2004: AS Académico de Leiria (1) (3rd/4th tier)
- 2004/2005: Avanca (1) (3rd/4th tier)
- 2005/2006: Empregados do Comércio (1) (3rd/4th tier)
- 2006/2007: CDE Camões (1) (3rd/4th tier)
- 2007/2008: CDE Camões (2) (3rd tier)
- 2008/2009: ISAVE (1) (3rd tier)

Year	Champion	TN	Second Place	Third Place	References
2009–10	São Mamede	3	Maria Balaio	Modicus	
2010–11	AC Fafe	1	ADA Maia	Avanca	
2011–12	Avanca	2	Camões	Marítimo	
2012–13	Passos Manuel	1	ADA Maia	Santo Tirso	
2013–14	Xico Andebol	3	Santo Tirso	Benfica B	
2014–15	AC Fafe	2	Avanca	Arsenal de Devesa	
2015–16	Boa-Hora	1	Arsenal de Devesa	São Mamede	
2016–17	São Bernardo	3	Xico Andebol	Santo Tirso	
2017–18	Sporting da Horta	1	Fermentões	Sanjoanense	
2018–19	FC Gaia	2	Boavista	Porto B	
2019–20	No champion due to COVID-19 pandemic				
2020–21	Xico Andebol	4	São Bernardo	Académico de Viseu	
2021–22	Académico de Viseu	1	Santo Tirso	Vitória Sport Clube	
2022–23	Vitória Sport Clube	1	Dom Fuas AC	Boa-Hora	
The Handball 2 Championship became the 3rd level with the creation of the Honor Division					
2023–24	Arsenal da Devesa	1	Sporting CP B	AC Fafe	
2024–25					

Note:
TN: Titles Number

== See also ==
Men's

- Andebol 1
- Third Division
- Taça de Portugal
- Supertaça
- Youth Honors

Women's

- First Division
- Taça de Portugal
- Supertaça
- Youth Honors (Women)
