= S.C. Espinho (handball) =

Portuguese handball club

Sporting Espinho (Portugal)
- Full name: Sporting Clube de Espinho
- Founded: 1914; 111 years ago
- Club colours

Sporting Clube de Espinho has a professional handball team based in Espinho, Portugal. It plays in LPA.
