= Vitória S.C. (handball) =

Portuguese handball club

Vitória Sport Clube
- Nickname: Vitória de Guimarães
- Founded: 1960s-1995 2020; 6 years ago
- Arena: Guimarães, Portugal; Pavilhão Desportivo Unidade Vimaranense
- Capacity: 2,500
- President: Rui Rodrigues
- Head coach: Nuno Santos
- League: Andebol 1
- 2024–25: Andebol 1, 7th of 12
- Club colours
| Home | Away |

Vitória Sport Clube is a Portuguese sports club in the city of Guimarães, where different sports are practiced. This article is about its professional handball section, whose senior men's team competes in the Portuguese Handball National Championship (Andebol 1), the highest level of the sport in Portugal.

The team, from youth to senior level, train and play their games in the Vimaranense Unit Sports Pavilion, which is located in the Vitória SC Academy.

== History ==
The handball section began between the club's 40th and 50th anniversaries in the 1960s, at the Campo da Amorosa rink, where they became national junior runners-up in their first season.

Over three decades of existence, the section enjoyed several regional and national successes at youth level, but was deactivated at the end of the 1994/95 season, the year in which Vitória Sport Clube won the National Youth Championship.

The section was later reactivated in the 2020/21 season, and soon demonstrated the quality needed to go far. The team quickly rose to the Handball National Championship (Andebol 1), the highest level, after two promotions as champions in the space of three years.

This resurgence comes through a partnership with CCR Fermentões, which focuses on training young people, with both clubs working together at the lower levels.

== Team ==
=== Current squad ===
Squad for the 2026–27 season

Goalkeepers
Left Wingers
Right Wingers

- (Portugal) Carlos Martins
- (Portugal) André Alves

Line players

Left Backs

- (Brazil) Alan Dieigon

Central Backs
Right Backs

=== Transfers ===
Transfers for the 2026–27 season

Joining

- (Brazil) Alan Dieigon (LB) from (Portugal) Póvoa AC
- (Portugal) Carlos Martins (RW) from (Portugal) ABC Braga
- (Portugal) André Alves (RW) from (Germany) VfL Eintracht Hagen

Leaving

- (Cape Verde) Rafael Andrade (RB) to (Portugal) AA Avanca
- (Egypt) Adel Ahmed (LB) to (Spain) CB Burgos
- (Portugal) Joao Saraiva (CB) to (Portugal) AA Avanca

=== Transfer History ===
Transfers for the 2025–26 season

Joining

- (Portugal) Joao Saraiva (CB) from (Portugal) Nazaré Dom Fuas AC

Leaving

- (Cuba) Freddy Lafontán Álvarez (LB) loan back to (Portugal) FC Porto
- (Portugal) Pedro Peneda (CB) to (Portugal) Águas Santas

== Men's Achievements ==
Andebol 2: 1

- 2022/23

Andebol 3: 1

- 2020/21

Total Trophies: 2 Nationals
