= Vitória F.C. (handball) =

Portuguese handball club

Vitória de Setúbal
- Full name: Vitória Futebol Clube
- Arena: Pavilhão Antoine Velge, Setúbal
- Head coach: (Portugal) António Santos
Home	Away

Vitória Futebol Clube is a professional handball team based in Setúbal, Portugal. It plays in LPA.
