= Pedro Cruz =

Mozambican swimmer

Personal information
- Full name: Joaquim Pedro Cruz
- Nationality: Mozambique
- Born: 9 December 1966 (age 59) Vila Cabral, Portuguese Mozambique

Sport
- Sport: Swimming
- Club: Ferroviário de Maputo

Joaquim Pedro Cruz (born 9 December 1966) is a Mozambican former backstroke and medley swimmer. He competed at the 1980 Summer Olympics and the 1984 Summer Olympics.
