= Xico Andebol =

Portuguese handball team

- Full name: Clube Desportivo Xico Andebol
- Short name: Xico
- Founded: 24 June 2009 (17 years ago)
- Arena: Pavilhão Desportivo Francisco Holanda, Guimarães
- Capacity: 500
- League: Second Division
- 2021–22: 1st
- Club colours
Home	Away

The Xico Andebol is a Portuguese handball team based in Guimarães, which plays in the top tier domestic league, the Andebol 1. It is the successor of Desportivo Francisco Holanda. In their first season they won the Portuguese Handball Cup.

== Titles ==
- Portuguese Handball Cup (1): 2010
- Portuguese Handball Second Division (2): 2014, 2022
