= Sporting Clube da Horta (handball) =

Portuguese handball club

Sporting Horta
- Full name: Sporting Clube da Horta
- Short name: Sporting Horta
- Founded: May 28, 1923; 103 years ago
- Arena: Pavilhão Desportivo da Horta; Horta, Azores (Portugal)
- Head coach: Tiago Cunha
- League: Andebol 1
- 2021–22: Andebol 1, 14th of 16
- Club colours

Sporting Clube da Horta is a professional handball team based in Horta, Azores, Portugal. It plays in the Liga Portuguesa de Andebol.

== Background ==
Sporting Clube da Horta was founded on May 28, 1923, being the 80th Branch of Sporting Clube de Portugal.

SC da Horta, based on the island of Horta in the Azores, started out as a football club, having even won the first district championship played in the Azores, in the 1930/31 season. In 2009/10, it played in the AF da Horta District Championship, but previously participated in the Azores Series of the 3rd National Division.

However, it is in handball that SC da Horta has distinguished itself most. In particular, in 2006 it managed to reach the final of the Challenge Cup (the second most important European handball competition), which it played against the Romanian team Steaua Bucharest. After winning the first game in Faial by 26–21 on 22 April 2006, SC da Horta lost by 34–27 in Bucharest.

In the 2015-16 season the team was relegated.

== Team ==
=== Current squad ===
Squad for the 2025–26 season

Goalkeepers
Left Wingers
Right Wingers
Line players

Left Backs
Central Backs
Right Backs

=== Transfers ===
Transfers for the 2026–27 season

Joining

Leaving

- (Portugal) Rafael Azevedo (GK) to (Portugal) AA Avanca

=== Transfer History ===
Transfers for the 2025–26 season

Joining

Leaving

- (Portugal) Afonso Freire Mendes (RW) loan back to (Portugal) S.L. Benfica

== European results ==
Season	Competition	Round		Result		Aggregate:
2006/07	EHF Challenge Cup	3rd Round	(Norway) Drammen HK	37–26	ABC Braga
2006/07	EHF Challenge Cup	3rd Round	ABC Braga	24–27	(Norway) Drammen HK	50–64
