= C.D. São Bernardo (handball) =

Portuguese handball club

C.D. São Bernardo (Portugal)
- Full name: Centro Desportivo São Bernardo
- Founded: 1974; 52 years ago
- Club colours

São Bernardo Is a professional handball team based in São Bernardo, Aveiro, Portugal founded in 1974. It has played in Campeonato Nacional de Andebol for several years.

== Achievements ==
- Champion of Divisão de Elite - 2 (2002–03, 2003–04)
- Champion of Andebol 2 - 3 (1983–84, 1997–98, 2016–17)

== Current squad 2024–25 ==
#		Name	Age	Last club
2	(Portugal)	Diogo Liberato	26	Ex-SC Horta
6	(Portugal)	Tiago Arrojado	24	Ex-Estarreja AC
7	(Portugal)	Helder Carlos	33
10	(Portugal)	João Pires	22	Ex-Xico Andebol
11	(Portugal)	Guilherme Alves	21	Ex-Póvoa AC
16	(Portugal)	Hugo Paula	23
19	(Portugal)	Miguel Ferreira	23	Ex-Alavarium
20	(Portugal)	José Crespo	22	Ex-Alavarium
21	(Portugal)	Leandro Rodrigues	29
22	(Portugal)	Gustavo Aragão	19
39	(Portugal)	Antonio Silva	33
23	(Portugal)	André Rego	31
80	(Portugal)	Diogo Vaia	26
