= Andebol 1 =

Handball league in Portugal

- Current season, competition or edition: 2024–25 Andebol 1
- Sport: Handball
- Founded: 1951
- No. of teams: 12
- Country: Portugal
- Confederation: Europe (EHF)
- Most recent champion: Sporting CP (24th title)
- Most titles: Sporting CP (24 titles)
- Broadcasters: TVI24; A Bola TV; BTV; Porto Canal; Sporting TV
- Streaming partner: ANDEBOL TV
- Relegation to: Segunda Divisão
- International cups: EHF Champions League; EHF European League; EHF European Cup
- Website: www.fpa.pt

The Campeonato Nacional de Andebol Masculino (English: Men's Handball National Championship), also known simply as Andebol 1 (or Campeonato Betclic Andebol for sponsorship reasons), is the premier handball league in Portugal and is overseen by the Portuguese Handball Federation.

The competition was created in 1951 and was formerly named Campeonato Nacional da Primeira Divisão (1951–1982 and 1985–2001), Divisão de Elite (2002–2006), and Liga Portuguesa de Andebol (2001–2009). Seven teams have won the league title since its inception.

Sporting CP are the current 3-peat Andebol 1 league champions with 24 titles, followed by FC Porto with 24 titles and ABC with 13.

== History ==
=== Creation of the league ===
Handball was first introduced in Portugal in 1929 and in 1939 the Portuguese Handball Federation is established. During the first half of the 20th century, the sport became increasingly trendy, becoming one of the most important team sports in Portugal, aside football and roller hockey. The increasing number of clubs featuring handball teams had already led to the establishment of regional championships in the regions of Metropolitan Lisbon and Greater Porto, as well as around Coimbra. The interest in defining a "national champion" led the federation to create a small tournament between the best teams of Lisbon and Porto (at first) and Coimbra (in a second phase).

=== Sporting and Porto dominion until the Carnation Revolution ===
Of the 23 championships played before the Carnation Revolution, only three were not won by Sporting CP or FC Porto. The two teams readily established themselves as the top-clubs in the country, growing after their eclecticism. Both teams featured the best Portuguese players of that time, sparking up a North-South rivalry between Porto and Lisbon, respectively.

FC Porto won the first tetracampeonato (4 titles in a row) in the history of the competition. On the other side, Sporting CP won the first pentacampeonato (5 titles in a row) in the history of the Portuguese handball, with a team that became known as "Os Sete Magníficos" (in English, The Seven Magnificent).

=== A real league in the European handball ===
In 1985, the championship assumed a league format disputed with 12 teams. This change in the competition format approximated the Portuguese league to other major European leagues and accounted for a significant increase in competitiveness. This consistent growth was backed by the investments made by multiple clubs, who sought to secure some foreign players (especially from the Balkans) as well as experienced and well-regarded coaches, whose knowledge of the sport allowed a solid increase in playing quality.

The peak of the growth of the club handball in Portugal was achieved by ABC, from Braga, when they reached the final of the first EHF Champions League final in 1994. They lost to CB Cantabria by 45–43. In 1999-00, ABC also reached the semi-finals of the EHF Cup.

=== League-Federation dispute and decline ===
In 2001, the clubs created an independent association, the Liga Portuguesa de Clubes de Andebol (in English, Portuguese Handball Clubs League), whose goal was to oversee a fully professional handball league, called Liga Portuguesa de Andebol (in English, Portuguese Handball League). However, in 2002, the Portuguese Handball Federation disputed the validity of the League and eventually refused accept the Liga Portuguesa de Andebol champions as "national champions".

As a consequence of the dispute, second-tier was renamed to Divisão de Elite (in English, Elite Division) and transformed into the official first-tier of the Portuguese handball. Its champions were declared "Portuguese champions".

The most dramatical consequence was the inability of the big professional clubs playing in Liga Portuguesa de Andebol to enter European Handball Federation competitions.

In 2005, the Federation finally recognised the Liga Portuguesa de Andebol as the first-tier of the Portuguese handball league system and agreed to granting autonomy to the League while overseeing it at the same time.

=== The fall of the League and the regrowth of club handball ===
The Liga Portuguesa de Clubes de Andebol folded in 2008, bringing the Liga Portuguesa de Andebol to an end. The short-lived competition was replaced by the new Andebol 1 (in English, Handball One) under the scope of the Portuguese Handball Federation. Since the rebranding of the championship in the 2009–2010 season, Portuguese club handball regained some of its notoriousness, namely in the international competitions. Sporting CP won the EHF Challenge Cup in 2010 and 2017 and ABC won the competition in 2016, in the first solely-Portuguese European final in the history of handball, beating Benfica by an aggregate of 53–51. ABC had also reached the final of the EHF Challenge Cup in 2015.

In the 2013–14 season, FC Porto became the first Portuguese team to participate in the group stage of the EHF Champions League since 2002. FC Porto, ABC and Sporting CP also participated in the 2015–16, 2016–17 and 2017–18 editions, although none of them passed through the group stage.

But the biggest achievement by Portuguese teams in international competitions run by EHF was Benfica win of 2021–22 European League season, defeating SC Magdeburg 40-39, in a dramatic final solved in the last second of the Extra-Time.

== Format ==
=== Current format ===
Since 2016, the competition is disputed in two phases (First Phase and Final phase).

During the First Phase, the 14 participating teams play themselves twice, in a league schedule, home and away. Each team plays, therefore, 26 matches during this phase. The top-6 teams qualify for the Group A of the Final Phase, whereas the 7th to 14th-placed teams qualify for the Group B of the Final Phase.

For the Final Phase, each team starts this phase of the competition with half of the points earned during the First Phase. During the Final Phase, the teams will play each other twice, in a league schedule, home and away. The Group A consists of the top-6 teams of the First Phase and will determine the final standings from the 1st to 6th-placed team. The Group B consists of the other 8 teams and will determine the final standings from the 7th to the 14th-placed teams.

The two bottom-placed teams in the Final Phase – Group B are relegated to the Second Division.

Currently, the champion qualifies to the EHF Champions League. The 2nd and 3rd-placed to the EHF Cup (the 2nd to the 2nd Qualifying Round and the 3rd to the 1st Qualifying Round). The 4th-placed team qualifies to the EHF Challenge Cup.

=== Former formats ===
==== Early years ====
On the first season (1951–52), the championship was played as a knockout tournament between four teams of Metropolitan Greater Lisbon region.

Then, from 1952 to 1962, the championship a mini-league was played between the best two teams of the regional championships of the districts of Lisbon and Porto to determine the national champion.

During the following two seasons, the mini-league was expanded from 8 then to 10 teams, to accommodate teams from the districts of Aveiro and Setúbal and, then, Coimbra.

==== Regional grouping period ====
From the 1962–63 to the 1984–1985 season, the championship was held in two phases. During the regular phase, the teams were distributed for a variable number of groups (2, 3 or 4) according to location criteria. The top teams of each group qualified for a brief Final Phase to determine the national champion.

The 1973–74 season was an exception to this format, as a single mainland championship was established, featuring 12 teams from the continental Portugal. This championship was to serve as a qualifying competition to a final knockout phase, which would include teams from the islands (Azores and Madeira) and the Portuguese colonies. Because of the coup d'état on 25 April and the revolution period that succeeded it, the final phase never happened and the winner of the former round was declared national champion.

==== Since 1985 ====
Since the 1985–86 season that the same format has been used with slight changes. The competition has evolved from 12 teams to 10 teams. Then, back to 12 teams and increased to 14 teams in 2016. The regular phase has always been succeeded by a final phase, disputed either in a small league with 4 or 6 teams and in a knockout format. The knockout format was lately tried on the 2015–2016 season, but it was changed back the following season. The format of the final phase (play-offs vs. mini-league) is still a topic of debate between the Portuguese clubs and fans.

== Teams ==
The teams contesting the 2026–27 Andebol 1 season are:

Team	Location	Arena	Sponsors
ABC Braga	Braga	Pavilhão Flávio Sá Leite	Universidade do Minho
Águas Santas	Maia	Pavilhão da Associação Atlética de Águas Santas	Milaneza
Artística de Avanca	Estarreja	Pavilhão Comendador Adelino Dias Costa	Bioria
Belenenses	Lisbon	Pavilhão Acácio Rosa	Zumub
Benfica	Lisbon	Pavilhão da Luz Nº 2	Metro Numbers
Carvalhos	Vila Nova de Gaia	Pavilhão Municipal de Vila Nova de Gaia	Sernox
FC Porto	Porto	Dragão Arena	Betano
Marítimo	Funchal, Madeira	Pavilhão do Marítimo	Hospital CUF Madeira
Póvoa AC	Póvoa de Varzim	Pavilhão Municipal da Póvoa de Varzim	Bodegão & Grupo CCR
Santo Tirso	Santo Tirso	Pavilhão Municipal de Santo Tirso	Retrotarget
Sporting CP	Lisbon	Pavilhão João Rocha	Kelly
Vitória SC	Guimarães	Pavilhão Desportivo Unidade Vimaranense	-

== Champions ==
=== Portuguese Handball First Division ===
Year	Champion	TN	References
1951–52	Sporting CP	1	
1952–53	Salgueiros	1	
1953–54	FC Porto	1	
1955–56	Sporting CP	2	
1956–57	FC Porto	2	
1957–58	FC Porto	3	
1958–59	FC Porto	4	
1959–60	FC Porto	5	
1960–61	Sporting CP	3	
1961–62	Benfica	1	
1962–63	FC Porto	6	
1963–64	FC Porto	7	
1964–65	FC Porto	8	
1965–66	Sporting CP	4	
1966–67	Sporting CP	5	
1967–68	FC Porto	9	
1968–69	Sporting CP	6	
1969–70	Sporting CP	7	
1970–71	Sporting CP	8	
1971–72	Sporting CP	9	
1972–73	Sporting CP	10	
1973–74	Belenenses	1	
1974–75	Benfica	2	
1975–76	Belenenses	2	
1976–77	Belenenses	3	
1977–78	Sporting CP	11	
1978–79	Sporting CP	12	
1979–80	Sporting CP	13	
1980–81	Sporting CP	14	
1981–82	Benfica	3	
1982–83	Benfica	4	
1983–84	Sporting CP	15	
1984–85	Belenenses	4	
1985–86	Sporting CP	16	
1986–87	ABC Braga	1	
1987–88	ABC Braga	2	
1988–89	Benfica	5	
1989–90	Benfica	6	
1990–91	ABC Braga	3	
1991–92	ABC Braga	4	
1992–93	ABC Braga	5	
1993–94	Belenenses	5	
1994–95	ABC Braga	6	
1995–96	ABC Braga	7	
1996–97	ABC Braga	8	
1997–98	ABC Braga	9	
1998–99	FC Porto	10	
1999–00	ABC Braga	10	
2000–01	Sporting CP	17	

=== Portuguese Handball League ===
Year	Champion	TN	References
2001–02	FC Porto	11	
2002–03	FC Porto	12	
2003–04	FC Porto	13	
2004–05	Madeira SAD	1	
2005–06	ABC Braga	11	
2006–07	ABC Braga	12	
2007–08	Benfica	7	
2008–09	FC Porto	14	

=== Divisão de Elite (Note: In 2002, due to disputes with the Portuguese League Association, the Federation refused to consider the League Champion as National Champion. So, the Portuguese Handball Federation reformulated the competitions, creating Divisão de Elite and considering it the champion, National Champion, although being the second handball league in Portugal. The worsts are relegated to Portuguese Handball Second Division (renamed First Division during that period). Teams could only get to Liga Portuguesa de Andebol candidature because LPA was a closed league. The best and most important Portuguese handball teams compete in Portuguese League except for Sporting CP which compete in Divisão de Elite. At the end of season 2005-2006, with the ending of the dispute between league and Federation was extinct Divisão de Elite.) ===
Year	Champion	TN	References
2002–03	São Bernardo	1	
2003–04	São Bernardo	2	
2004–05	Sporting CP	18	
2005–06	Sporting CP	19	

=== Andebol 1 ===
Year	Champion	TN	Second Place	Third Place	Fourth Place	References
2009–10	FC Porto	15	Madeira SAD	Benfica	ABC Braga	
2010–11	FC Porto	16	Madeira SAD	Sporting CP	Benfica	
2011–12	FC Porto	17	Madeira SAD	Sporting CP	Benfica	
2012–13	FC Porto	18	Benfica	Sporting CP	Águas Santas	
2013–14	FC Porto	19	Sporting CP	ABC Braga	Benfica	
2014–15	FC Porto	20	Sporting CP	Benfica	ABC Braga	
2015–16	ABC Braga	13	Benfica	FC Porto	Sporting CP	
2016–17	Sporting CP	20	FC Porto	Benfica	Madeira SAD	
2017–18	Sporting CP	21	Benfica	FC Porto	ABC Braga	
2018–19	FC Porto	21	Sporting CP	Benfica	Águas Santas	
2019–20	FC Porto	(Note: The season was not completed due to the COVID-19 pandemic in Portugal. FC Porto qualified for the 2020–21 EHF Champions League for being in 1st place of the Andebol 1 classification table at the time of the cancellation, but was not declared champion.)	Sporting CP	Benfica	Belenenses	
2020–21	FC Porto	22	Sporting CP	Benfica	Águas Santas	
2021–22	FC Porto	23	Sporting CP	Benfica	Belenenses	
2022–23	FC Porto	24	Sporting CP	Benfica	ABC Braga	
2023–24	Sporting CP	22	FC Porto	Benfica	ABC Braga	
2024–25	Sporting CP	23	FC Porto	Benfica	Madeira SAD	
2025–26	Sporting CP	24	FC Porto	Benfica	Águas Santas	

TN: Title Numbers

== Performances ==
Club	Titles	Seasons
FC Porto	24	1953–54, 1956–57, 1957–58, 1958–59, 1959–60, 1962–63, 1963–64, 1964–65, 1967–68, 1998–99, 2001–02, 2002–03, 2003–04, 2008–09, 2009–10, 2010–11, 2011–12, 2012–13, 2013–14, 2014–15, 2018–19, 2020–21, 2021–22, 2022–23
Sporting CP	24	1951–52, 1955–56, 1960–61, 1965–66, 1966–67, 1968–69, 1969–70, 1970–71, 1971–72, 1972–73, 1977–78, 1978–79, 1979–80, 1980–81, 1983–84, 1985–86, 2000–01, 2004–05, 2005–06, 2016–17, 2017–18, 2023–24, 2024–25, 2025–26
ABC Braga	13	1986–87, 1987–88, 1990–91, 1991–92, 1992–93, 1994–95, 1995–96, 1996–97, 1997–98, 1999–2000, 2005–06, 2006–07, 2015–16
Benfica	7	1961–62, 1974–75, 1981–82, 1982–83, 1988–89, 1989–90, 2007–08
Belenenses	5	1973–74, 1975–76, 1976–77, 1984–85, 1993–94
São Bernardo	2	2002–03, 2003–04
Salgueiros	1	1952–53
Madeira SAD	1	2004–05

Italics: Winners of Divisão de Elite, during the League-Federation dispute.red

== U20 Andebol 1 ==
Current season	2025-26 U20 Andebol 1

=== Champions ===
Year	Champion	TN	Second Place	Third Place	Fourth Place	References
2021–22	Águas Santas	1	Boa Hora	FC Gaia	Sanjoanense	
2022–23	Águas Santas	2	FC Porto	ABC Braga	Padroense	
2023–24	Águas Santas	3	ABC Braga	Arsenal C. Devesa	CCR Fermentoes	
2024–25	FC Porto	1	Benfica	Sporting CP	FC Gaia	
2025-26	Sporting CP	1	FC Porto	Benfica	ABC Braga	

=== Performances ===
Club	Titles	Season
Águas Santas	3	2021–22, 2022–23, 2023–24
FC Porto	1	2024–25
Sporting CP	1	2025–26

== EHF coefficients ==
The following data indicates Portuguese coefficient rankings between European handball leagues.

Country ranking

EHF League Ranking for 2022/23 season:

- 4. (5) (Hungary) Nemzeti Bajnokság I (94.17)
- 5. (7) (Denmark) Danish Handball League (87.33)
- 6. (4) (North Macedonia) Macedonian Handball Super League (86.00)
- 7. (6) (Poland) Polish Superliga (80.67)
- 8. (8) (Portugal) Andebol 1 (79.67)

Club ranking

EHF Club Ranking as of 25 September 2025:

- 11. Sporting CP (434)
- 19. Porto (212)
- 21. Benfica (190)
- 66. ABC Braga (66)
- 87. Madeira SAD (52)
- 119. Águas Santas (34)

== See also ==
Men's

- Second Division
- Third Division
- Taça de Portugal
- Supertaça
- Youth Honors

Women's

- First Division
- Taça de Portugal
- Supertaça
- Youth Honors (Women)
