= FC Porto (handball) =

Portuguese handball club

- Full name: Futebol Clube do Porto
- Founded: 1932; 94 years ago (parent club in 1893)
- Arena: Dragão Arena
- Capacity: 2,200
- President: André Villas-Boas
- Head coach: Magnus Andersson
- League: Andebol 1
- 2023–24: Andebol 1, 2nd of 16
- Club colours
Home	Away

Futebol Clube do Porto (Portuguese pronunciation: [futɨˈβɔl ˈkluβɨ ðu ˈpoɾtu]), commonly referred to as FC Porto or simply Porto, is a Portuguese professional handball team based in Porto. Created in 1932, it is the senior representative side of the handball section of sports club FC Porto.

The team competes domestically in the top-tier league Andebol 1 and internationally in European Handball Federation club competitions, such as the EHF Champions League and the EHF European League. Home matches are played at the Dragão Arena, alongside the men's basketball and roller hockey, and women's volleyball teams. The current head coach is former Swedish international Magnus Andersson, who returned to the club after a one-season break, having held the job from 2018 to 2023.

== History ==
The section started in 1932 with a field handball (eleven-a-side) team, which played competitive matches until 1974–75, when it was discontinued in favour of seven-a-side handball. During this period, the club won 37 regional and 29 national league titles in the field handball discipline.

In 1951, the club established the handball section whose team won the Portuguese league title for the first time in 1953–54, and increased that tally with eight further titles by 1968. Porto then endured a 31-year drought before winning the national league title again in 1998–99. In the 2014–15 season, the team secured their seventh consecutive league title, establishing a national record. In the previous season, the team also debuted in the EHF Champions League group stage, after overcoming the qualification tournament for the first time in five consecutive attempts.

== Kits ==
HOME
2014–15	2016–17	2018–19	2019–20	2020–21	2021–22	2022–23	2024–25

AWAY
2016–17	2019–20	2020–21	2021–22	2023–24

THIRD
2024–25

== Team ==
=== Current squad ===
Squad for the 2026–27 season

Goalkeepers

- 12 (Sweden) Sebastian Abrahamsson
- 23 (Portugal) Bernardo Sousa
- 33 (Portugal) Diogo Rêma

Left wingers

- 21 (Portugal) Leonel Fernandes
- 71 (Portugal) Pedro Oliveira

Right wingers

- 24 (Spain) Antonio Martínez
- 28 (Portugal) José Ferreira

Line players

- 15 (Portugal) Daymaro Salina
- 65 (Brazil) Guilherme Borges
- 86 (Portugal) Ricardo Brandão
- 92 (France) Timmy Petit

Left backs

- 5 (Iceland) Þorsteinn Leó Gunnarsson
- 9 (Portugal) Miguel Oliveira
- 13 (Cuba) Freddy Lafontán Álvarez
- 18 (Portugal) Vasco Costa
- 90 (Portugal) Gilberto Duarte

Central backs

- 14 (Portugal) Rui Silva
- 34 (Portugal) Xavier Barbosa

Right backs

- 17 (Portugal) João Gomes
- 37 (Sweden) Linus Persson

=== Transfers ===
Transfers for the 2026–27 season

Joining

- (Brazil) Guilherme Borges (LP) from (France) Istres Provence Handball
- (Portugal) Xavier Barbosa (CB) from (Portugal) AA Avanca
- (Portugal) João Magalhães (LW) back from loan at (Portugal) FC Gaia

Leaving

- (Spain) Pol Valera (CB) to (France) Montpellier Handball
- (France) Timmy Petit (LP) to (France) Tremblay Handball
- (Cuba) Freddy Lafontán Álvarez (LB) to (France) JS Cherbourg
- (Spain) Mamadou Diocou (RW) to (Romania) CS Minaur Baia Mare
- (Colombia) Jesús Hurtado (LP) to (Slovenia) RK Celje
- (Portugal) João Magalhães (LW) to (Spain) CD Bidasoa
- (Bosnia and Herzegovina) Ante Grbavac (GK) (end of loan (Croatia) RK Zagreb)

=== Transfer History ===
Transfers for the 2025–26 season

Joining

- (Sweden) Linus Persson (RB) from (Denmark) GOG Håndbold
- (Spain) Pol Valera (CB) from (Spain) FC Barcelona
- (France) Timmy Petit (LP) from (France) Limoges Handball
- (Portugal) Vasco Costa (LB) back from loan at (Sweden) Hammarby IF Handboll
- (Colombia) Jesús Hurtado (LP) back from loan at (Slovenia) RK Celje
- (Cuba) Freddy Lafontán Álvarez (LB) back from loan at (Portugal) Vitória Sport Clube
- (Portugal) João Gomes (RB) on loan from (Germany) VfL Gummersbach

Leaving

- (Spain) David Fernández Alonso (RB) to (Spain) CB Caserio Ciudad Real
- (Cuba) Pedro Valdés (LB) to (Romania) Dinamo București
- (Portugal) Victor Iturriza (LP) to Kuwait SC
- (Portugal) André Sousa (CB) to (France) Chambéry SMBH
- (Portugal) Fábio Magalhães (LB) to ( (Portugal) ABC/UMinho)
- (Portugal) Diogo Oliveira (CB) to ( (France) Dunkerque Handball Grand Littoral)
- (Denmark) Jakob Mikkelsen (RB) (to ?)
- (Portugal) João Magalhães (LW) on loan at (Portugal) FC Gaia

=== Staff ===
Position	Name
Sports director	(Portugal) José Magalhães
Assistant director	(Portugal) Manuel Arezes
Head coach	(Sweden) Magnus Andersson
Assistant coach	(Portugal) Carlos Martingo
Goalkeeping coach	(Portugal) Telmo Ferreira
Fitness coach	(Portugal) Tiago Cadete

=== Retired numbers ===
No.	Nat.	Player	Position	Tenure	Ref.
1	(Portugal)	Alfredo Quintana	Goalkeeper	2010–2021	

== Honours ==
Porto is the second most decorated Portuguese club in domestic competitions, with a total of 44 titles.

- Portuguese League

Winners (24) – record: 1953–54, 1956–57, 1957–58, 1958–59, 1959–60, 1962–63, 1963–64, 1964–65, 1967–68, 1998–99, 2001–02, 2002–03, 2003–04, 2008–09, 2009–10, 2010–11, 2011–12, 2012–13, 2013–14, 2014–15, 2018–19, 2019–20, 2020–21, 2021–22, 2022–23

- Portuguese Cup

Winners (9): 1975–76, 1976–77, 1978–79, 1979–80, 1993–94, 2005–06, 2006–07, 2018–19, 2020–21

- Portuguese League Cup

Winners (3) – record: 2003–04, 2004–05, 2007–08

- Portuguese Super Cup

Winners (8) – record: 1994, 1999, 2000, 2002, 2009, 2014, 2019, 2021

== European record ==
Note: Porto's score is always listed first.

Season	Competition	Round	Club	1st leg	2nd leg	Aggregate
2016–17	EHF Cup	R1	(Georgia (country)) B.S.B. Batumi	49–16	44–16	93–32
2016–17	EHF Cup	R2	(Slovenia) RD Koper 2013	31–24	26–22	57–46
2016–17	EHF Cup	R3	(Austria) Bregenz Handball	28–27	31–29	59–56
2016–17	EHF Cup	Group stage	(Germany) Frisch Auf Göppingen	27–31	28–30	3rd place
2016–17	EHF Cup	Group stage	(Spain) Fraikin Granollers	23–22	22–33	3rd place
2016–17	EHF Cup	Group stage	(Denmark) HC Midtjylland	33–25	26–29	3rd place
2017–18	EHF Cup	R2	(North Macedonia) RK Ohrid 2013	37–20	44–26	81–46
2017–18	EHF Cup	R3	(Germany) Füchse Berlin	27–30	25–33	52–63
2018–19	EHF Cup	R1	(Romania) AHC Potaissa Turda	41–21	27–24	68–45
2018–19	EHF Cup	R2	(Belarus) SKA Minsk	34–29	24–25	58–54
2018–19	EHF Cup	R3	(Germany) SC Magdeburg	23–26	34–27	57–53
2018–19	EHF Cup	Group stage	(Spain) Liberbank Cuenca	37–26	29–26	1st place
2018–19	EHF Cup	Group stage	(Romania) Dobrogea Sud Constanța	35–19	30–27	1st place
2018–19	EHF Cup	Group stage	(Denmark) TTH Holstebro	33–31	32–29	1st place
2018–19	EHF Cup	QF	(France) Saint-Raphaël Var Handball	30–30	34–30	64–60
2018–19	EHF Cup	SF	(Germany) Füchse Berlin	20–24		
2018–19	EHF Cup	3rd place	(Denmark) TTH Holstebro	28–26		
2019–20	EHF Champions League	Group stage	(Belarus) Meshkov Brest	27–25	35–32	5th place
2019–20	EHF Champions League	Group stage	(North Macedonia) RK Vardar	27–32	30–22	5th place
2019–20	EHF Champions League	Group stage	(Poland) PGE Vive Kielce	33–30	25–30	5th place
2019–20	EHF Champions League	Group stage	(Hungary) Telekom Veszprém	28–38	24–31	5th place
2019–20	EHF Champions League	Group stage	(Ukraine) Motor Zaporozhye	35–35	29–33	5th place
2019–20	EHF Champions League	Group stage	(France) Montpellier Handball	23–23	27–22	5th place
2019–20	EHF Champions League	Group stage	(Germany) THW Kiel	28–27	29–30	5th place
2019–20	EHF Champions League	R16	(Denmark) Aalborg Håndbold	Cancelled (Note: Knockout stage matches (round of 16 and quarter-finals) were cancelled due to the COVID-19 pandemic, with the EHF selecting the top two teams from Groups A and B to compete in the Final Four.)		
2020–21	EHF Champions League	Group stage	(Norway) Elverum Håndball	28–30	38–31	5th place
2020–21	EHF Champions League	Group stage	(Belarus) Meshkov Brest	27–25	0–10	5th place
2020–21	EHF Champions League	Group stage	(Germany) Flensburg-Handewitt	29–36	10–0	5th place
2020–21	EHF Champions League	Group stage	(Hungary) MOL-Pick Szeged	25–19	31–35	5th place
2020–21	EHF Champions League	Group stage	(North Macedonia) Vardar 1961	25–25	27–24	5th place
2020–21	EHF Champions League	Group stage	(Poland) Vive Kielce	32–32	30–32	5th place
2020–21	EHF Champions League	Group stage	(France) Paris Saint-Germain	31–34	28–29	5th place
2020–21	EHF Champions League	Playoffs	(Denmark) Aalborg Håndbold	32–29	24–27	56–56 (a)
2021–22	EHF Champions League	Group stage	Motor	27–30	10–0	5th place
2021–22	EHF Champions League	Group stage	Flensburg-Handewitt	28–27	26–26	5th place
2021–22	EHF Champions League	Group stage	Dinamo București	27–26	31–32	5th place
2021–22	EHF Champions League	Group stage	Telekom Veszprém	23–30	28–28	5th place
2021–22	EHF Champions League	Group stage	(Poland) Łomża Vive Kielce	33–39	29–27	5th place
2021–22	EHF Champions League	Group stage	FC Barcelona	33–33	31–38	5th place
2021–22	EHF Champions League	Group stage	Paris Saint-Germain	19–33	30–39	5th place
2021–22	EHF Champions League	Playoffs	(France) Montpellier Handball	29–29	27–35	56–64
2022–23	EHF Champions League	Group stage	Orlen Wisła Płock	23–27	27–28	8th place
2022–23	EHF Champions League	Group stage	Telekom Veszprém	28–35	30–32	8th place
2022–23	EHF Champions League	Group stage	PPD Zagreb	23–29	28–26	8th place
2022–23	EHF Champions League	Group stage	Dinamo București	27–32	32–23	8th place
2022–23	EHF Champions League	Group stage	(Denmark) GOG Håndbold	26–33	33–34	8th place
2022–23	EHF Champions League	Group stage	Paris Saint-Germain	30–32	33–35	8th place
2022–23	EHF Champions League	Group stage	SC Magdeburg	36–41	31–31	8th place
2023–24	EHF Champions League	Group stage	Orlen Wisła Płock	24–23	29–29	7th place
2023–24	EHF Champions League	Group stage	Celje Pivovarna Laško	30–29	32–30	7th place
2023–24	EHF Champions League	Group stage	Barça	30–38	33–40	7th place
2023–24	EHF Champions League	Group stage	Telekom Veszprém	34–44	26–40	7th place
2023–24	EHF Champions League	Group stage	(Germany) SC Magdeburg	33–37	31–40	7th place
2023–24	EHF Champions League	Group stage	GOG Håndbold	32–31	27–35	7th place
2023–24	EHF Champions League	Group stage	Montpellier Handball	24–35	25–29	7th place
2024–25	EHF European League	Group stage	MT Melsungen	24–29	27–32	2nd place
2024–25	EHF European League	Group stage	Valur	27–27	37–29	2nd place
2024–25	EHF European League	Group stage	RK Vardar	26–22	37–24	2nd place
2024–25	EHF European League	Main round	RK Vojvodina	29–20	38–30	3rd place
2024–25	EHF European League	Main round	THW Kiel	22–32	30–35	3rd place
2024–25	EHF European League	Play-offs	Fenix Toulouse Handball	35–28	28–30	63–58
2024–25	EHF European League	QF	Montpellier Handball	29–30	32–35	61–65
2025–26	EHF European League	Group stage	Knattspyrnufélagið Fram	38–26	44–30	1st place
2025–26	EHF European League	Group stage	HC Kriens-Luzern	44–31	44–26	1st place
2025–26	EHF European League	Group stage	Elverum Håndball	29–25	29–31	1st place
2025–26	EHF European League	Main round	SAH - Skanderborg	28–33	30–29	1st place
2025–26	EHF European League	Main round	Fraikin BM Granollers	29–27	34–33	1st place
2025–26	EHF European League	QF	MT Melsungen	23–28	23–19	46–47
2026–27	EHF Champions League	Group stage	One Veszprém HC	28–36	29–34	3rd place
2026–27	EHF Champions League	Group stage	RK Partizan AdmiralBet	32–28	33–33	3rd place
2026–27	EHF Champions League	Group stage	Füchse Berlin	32–40	33–36	3rd place
2026–27	EHF European League	Play-offs	TBD	–	–	–
