= C.F. Os Belenenses (handball) =

Portuguese handball club

- Full name: Clube de Futebol Os Belenenses
- Short name: Belenenses
- Founded: 1932; 94 years ago (parent club in 1919)
- Arena: Pavilhão Acácio Rosa, Lisbon
- Capacity: 1,683
- President: Patrick Carvalho
- Head coach: Carlos Jorge
- League: Andebol 1
- 2021–22: Andebol 1, 4th of 16
Home	Away

Clube de Futebol Os Belenenses is a professional Handball team based in Lisbon, Portugal. It plays in LPA, the top Handball league of Portugal.

== Team ==
=== Current squad ===
Squad for the 2025–26 season

Goalkeepers
Left Wingers
Right Wingers
Line players

- (Brazil) Matheus Queiróz Pereira

Left Backs
Central Backs
Right Backs

- (Portugal) Gonçalo Nogueira

=== Transfers ===
Transfers for the 2026–27 season

Joining

- (Brazil) Matheus Queiróz Pereira (LP) from (Portugal) ABC Braga

Leaving

- (Spain) Aldo Pagliotta (LP) to (Sweden) HK Malmö

=== Transfer History ===
Transfers for the 2025–26 season

Joining

- (Portugal) Gonçalo Nogueira (RB) from (Portugal) ABC Braga
- (Spain) Aldo Pagliotta (LP) from (Portugal) S.L. Benfica

Leaving

- (Portugal) João Pedro Fialho Ferreira (CB) to (Spain) BM Cisne

== Honours ==
=== Domestic competitions ===
- Portuguese League: 5
  - 1973–74, 1975–76, 1976–77, 1984–85, 1993–94
- Portuguese Cup: 4
  - 1973–74, 1977–78, 1981–82, 1983–84
- Portuguese League Cup: 1
  - 2005–06
- Portuguese Super Cup: 1
  - 1983
