= Associação Atlética de Águas Santas =

Portuguese handball club

Águas Santas
- Full name: Associação Atlética de Águas Santas
- Founded: 1962; 64 years ago
- Arena: Pavilhão da Águas Santas, Águas Santas, Maia
- Head coach: Ricardo Moreira
- League: Andebol 1
- 2021–22: Andebol 1, 5th of 16
Home	Away

Associação Atlética Águas Santas is a professional Handball team based in Maia, Porto District, Portugal. It plays in LPA.

== Team ==
=== Current squad ===
Squad for the 2025–26 season

Goalkeepers
Left Wingers
Right Wingers

- (Portugal) Pedro Portela
- (Portugal) André Azevedo

Line players

Left Backs
Central Backs

- (Portugal) Pedro Peneda
- (Portugal) Rui Baptista

Right Backs

=== Transfers ===
Transfers for the 2026–27 season

Joining

- (Portugal) Rui Baptista (CB) from (Portugal) S.L. Benfica

Leaving

- (Portugal) Bernardo Pegas (RB) to (Portugal) S.L. Benfica

=== Transfer History ===
Transfers for the 2025–26 season

Joining

- (Portugal) Pedro Portela (RW) from (Portugal) Sporting CP
- (Portugal) Pedro Peneda (CB) from (Portugal) Vitória Sport Clube
- (Portugal) André Azevedo (RW) from (Portugal) AA Avanca

Leaving

- (Portugal) Miguel Alfredo Silva Alves (RW) to (Switzerland) TSV St. Otmar St. Gallen
- (Portugal) Diogo Alexandre Coutinho Ribeiro (GK) to (Portugal) ABC Braga
- (Portugal) André Samúdio (CB) to (Portugal) GC Santo Tirso

== Honours ==
Domestic competitions
Portuguese Cup	1	2001–02
U20 Andebol 1	3	2021–22, 2022–23, 2023–24

=== Unofficial Trophys ===
- Limburgse Handbal Dagen: 1
  - 2013
