= Pavilhão da Luz Nᵒ 2 =

S.L. Benfica arena in Lisbon, Portugal

Pavilhão da Luz Nº 2
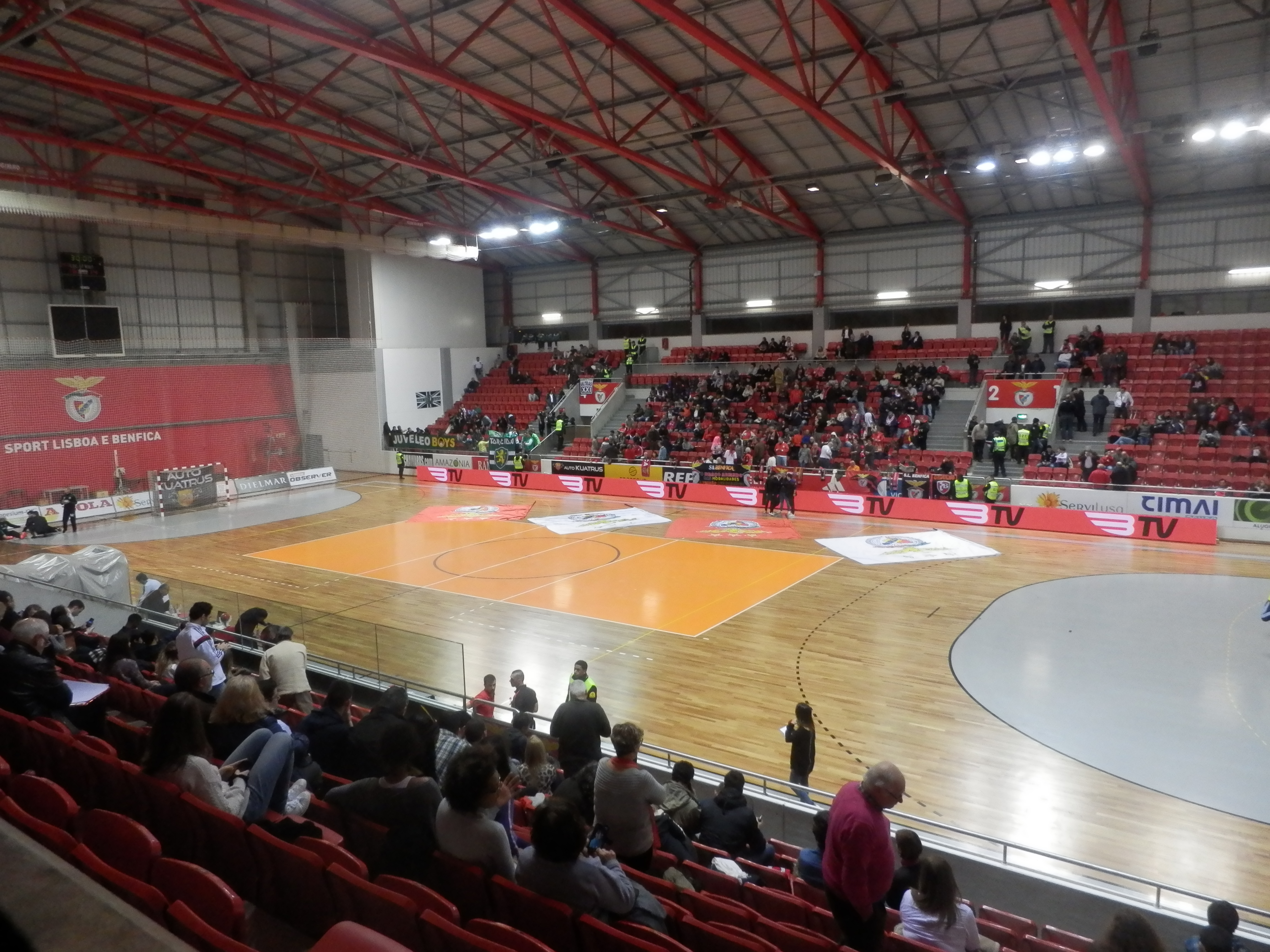
- Interactive map of Pavilhão da Luz Nº 2
- Address: Av. Eusébio da Silva Ferreira, 1500-313
- Location: Lisbon, Portugal
- Coordinates: 38.751829°N 9.183357°W
- Owner: S.L. Benfica
- Capacity: 1,800
- Public transit: Alto dos Moinhos and Colégio Militar/Luz; Lisbon Metro Blue Line

Construction
- Built: March 2002 – March 2004
- Opened: March 2004
- Architect: Damon Lavelle

Tenants
- Handball; Volleyball

Website
- slbenfica.pt

The Pavilhão da Luz Nº 2 is the second arena (or pavilion) of Portuguese multi-sport club S.L. Benfica.

== About ==
It has a full capacity of 1,800 seats and is mainly used by the handball and volleyball departments of the club. Its construction ran at the same time as the adjacent arena, Pavilhão Fidelidade, but it was finished just a couple weeks later. Because the old Pavilhão da Luz was at full capacity with five sports, Benfica planned the new Estádio da Luz with two indoor arenas; the smaller one only hosting two departments. Its differences from the main arena are its roof and its two side stands, who sit fewer people.
