= ABC/UMinho =

Portuguese handball club

ABC Braga
- Full name: Académico Basket Clube
- Founded: December 29, 1933; 92 years ago
- Arena: Pavilhão Flávio Sá Leite, Braga, Portugal
- Capacity: 1000
- President: Carlos Matos
- Head coach: Filipe Magalhães
- League: Andebol 1
- 2023–24: 4th
Home	Away

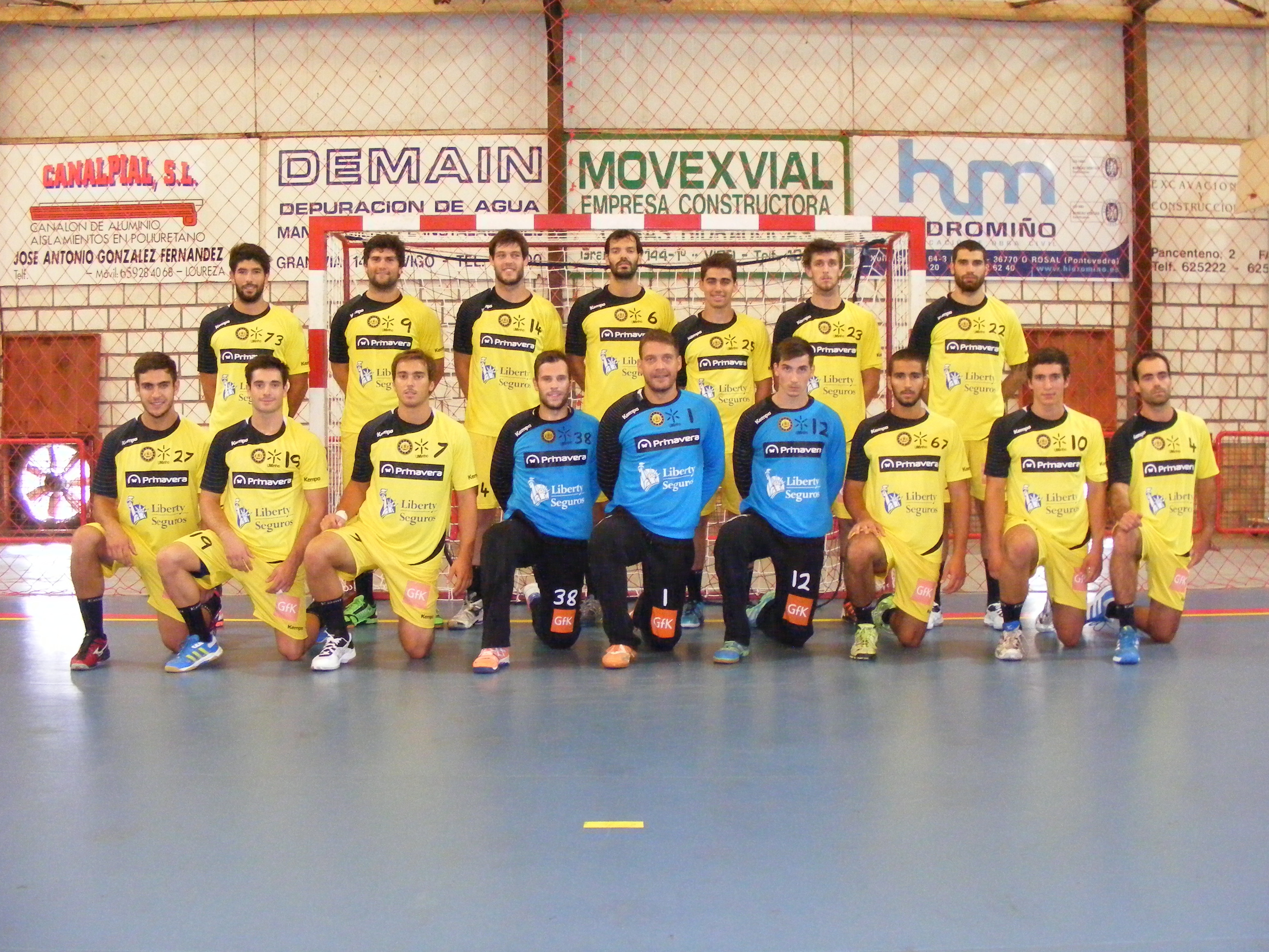
ABC Braga in the Trofeo Concello do Rosal 2013

ABC Braga is a professional handball team based in Braga, Portugal. It plays in LPA. It was founded on 29 December 1933. Despite the practice of handball as a primary sport, the club plays other sports such as roller hockey, basketball, athletics, volleyball, chess, skating, and taekwondo. It is the club with the third most trophies in Andebol 1 behind Porto and Sporting.

It is the sole Portuguese club to have played in an EHF Champions League final, which happened in the 1993–1994 season.

== Kits ==
AWAY

2016–17

== Team ==
=== Current squad ===
Squad for the 2025–26 season

Goalkeepers

- (Portugal) Diogo Alexandre Coutinho Ribeiro

Left Wingers

- (Portugal) Gonçalo Moreira Grácio
- (Portugal) Manuel Costa

Right Wingers
Line players

- (Cuba) Claudio Molis Morales
- (Portugal) Hugo Costa

Left Backs

- (Portugal) Rodrigo Esteves

Central Backs
Right Backs

- (Portugal) Tomás Teixeira

=== Transfers ===
Transfers for the 2026–27 season

Joining

- (Portugal) Gonçalo Moreira Grácio (LW) from (Netherlands) Hurry-Up
- (Portugal) Hugo Costa (LP) from (Portugal) AA Avanca
- (Portugal) Manuel Costa (LW) from (Portugal) Arsenal da Defesa
- (Portugal) Rodrigo Esteves (LB) from (Portugal) FC Gaia

Leaving

- (Brazil) Matheus Queiróz Pereira (LP) to (Portugal) CF Belenenses
- (Portugal) Gonçalo Meireles (LW) to (Portugal) S.L. Benfica
- (Portugal) André José (CB) to (France) C' Chartres MHB
- (Portugal) Carlos Martins (RW) to (Portugal) Vitória Sport Clube
- (Portugal) Tiago Ferreira (GK) to (Portugal) Póvoa AC
- (Portugal) Rafael Vasconcelos (RB) loan back to (Portugal) Sporting CP

=== Transfer History ===
Transfers for the 2025–26 season

Joining

- (Cuba) Claudio Molis Morales (LP) from (Portugal) Póvoa AC
- (Portugal) Tomás Teixeira (RB) from (Portugal) Póvoa AC
- (Portugal) Diogo Alexandre Coutinho Ribeiro (GK) from (Portugal) Águas Santas
- (Portugal) Rafael Vasconcelos (RB) on loan from (Portugal) Sporting CP

Leaving

- (Brazil) Asaph Ching (GK) to (Spain) Club Balonmano Nava
- (Portugal) Filipe Monteiro (CB) to (Portugal) Sporting CP
- (Portugal) André Fallé Ferreira (RW) to (Portugal) Arsenal Clube da Devesa
- (Portugal) Gonçalo Nogueira (RB) to (Portugal) CF Belenenses

== Honours ==
=== Men's ===
Internacional competitions
EHF Challenge Cup	1	2015–16
Domestic competitions
First Division / Andebol 1	13	1986–87, 1987–88, 1990–91, 1991–92, 1992–93, 1994–95, 1995–96, 1996–97, 1997–98, 1999–2000, 2005–06, 2006–07, 2015–16
Taça de Portugal	12	1989–90, 1990–91, 1991–92, 1992–93, 1994–95, 1995–96, 1996–97, 1999–00, 2007–08, 2008–09, 2014–15, 2016–17
Supertaça	7	1990, 1991, 1992, 1995, 1998, 2015, 2017

=== International competitions ===
- EHF Champions League
  - Runner-up (1): 1993–94
- EHF Cup :
  - Last 4 (1): 1999–2000
- EHF Challenge Cup :
  - Winner (1): 2015–16
  - Runner-up (2): 2004–04, 2014–15

== List of ABC Braga seasons ==
=== Men's ===
Season	League										TP	ST	European Competitions		Notes		References
Season	Div.		Pos.	Pld	W	D	L	GF	GA	Pts	TP	ST	European Competitions		Notes		References
2009–10	A1	1st	4th	32	18	3	11	797	758	45	L16	4th	EHF Cup Winners' Cup	QF	–		
2010–11	A1	1st	5th	32	21	2	9	801	748	47	QF	6th	EHF Challenge Cup	Q1	–		
2011–12	A1	1st	6th	32	16	1	15	820	803	41	L16	–	–		–		
2012–13	A1	1st	5th	32	14	2	16	809	793	37	QF	–	–		–		
2013–14	A1	1st	3rd	32	22	2	8	809	793	51	RU	–	–		–		
2014–15	A1	1st	4th	30	19	1	10	943	846	3/4	W	–	EHF Challenge Cup	RU	–		
2015–16	A1	1st	1st	34	26	0	8	1048	961	F	QF	W	EHF Challenge Cup	W	–		
2016–17	A1	1st	5th	36	21	2	13	1115	1012	48	W	RU	EHF Champions League	GS	–		
2017–18	A1	1st	4th	36	22	4	10	999	895	53	L16	W	–		–		
2018–19	A1	1st	7th	36	24	4	12	1127	983	64	QF	–	–		–		
2019–20	A1	1st	6th	26	13	2	11	679	667	54	L16	–	–		Torneio Luís Gonçalves	W	
2020–21	A1	1st	9th	30	10	4	16	796	808	54	QF	–	–		–		
2021–22	A1	1st	10th	30	12	2	16	825	845	56	L16	–	–		Torneio Luís Gonçalves	W	
2022–23	A1	1st	4th	26	16	0	10	791	773	58	QF	–	–		Torneio Luís Gonçalves Torneo Internacional Pontevedra	4th 3th	
2023–24	A1	1st	4th	26	13	3	12	787	810	33	QF	–	EHF European League	GS	–		
2024–25	A1	1st	5th	28	15	3	10	843	826	37	SF	–	EHF European League	QR	–		
2025–26	A1	1st	7th	28	11	3	14	826	851	30	L16	–	EHF European League	QR	–		

=== Women's ===
Season	League										TP	ST	European Competitions	Notes	References
Season	Div.		Pos.	Pld	W	D	L	GF	GA	Pts	TP	ST	European Competitions	Notes	References
2017–18	IID	2nd	10th	20	1	0	19	439	638	22	L32	–	–	–	
2018–19	IID	2nd	1st	14	12	0	2	437	331	38	QF	–	–	–	
2019–20	ID	1st	8th	22	6	5	11	541	578	39	L16	–	–	–	
2020–21	ID	1st	7th	26	11	2	13	654	685	50	L16	–	–	–	
2021–22	ID	1st	8th	26	10	3	23	616	638	49	L16	–	–	–	
2022–23	ID	1st	6th	22	11	1	10	571	633	45	QF	–	–	–	
2023–24	ID	1st	TBA	–	–	–	–	–	–	TBA	QF	–	–	–	

=== Keys ===
- Div. = Division
- Pos. = Position
- Pld = Matches played
- W = Matches won
- D = Matches drawn
- L = Matches lost
- GF = Goals for
- GA = Goals against
- Pts = Points
- QR = Qualifying round
- Q1 = 1st qualifying round
- Q2 = 2nd qualifying round
- Q3 = 3rd qualifying round
- PO = Play-off round
- GS = Group stage
- 2nd GS = 2nd group stage
- L32 = Last Thirty-Two
- L16 = Eight-Finals
- QF = Quarter-finals
- SF = Semi-finals
- RU = Runner-up
- W = Winner
- R1 = 1st round
- R2 = 2nd round
- R3 = 3rd round
- R4 = 4th round
- R5 = 5th round
- n/a = competition not yet started or canceled
Winners / 1st Place
Runners-up / 2nd Place
Semi-finals / 3rd Place
Promotion
Relegation

== European record ==
Season	Competition	Round	Club	Home	Away	Aggregate
1987–88	European Cup	R1	(Switzerland) Amicitia Zürich	22–16	14–26	36–42
1988–89	European Cup	R1	(France) USAM Nîmes	18–15	21–27	39–42
1990–91	Cup Winners Cup	R1	(Spain) Elgorriaga Bidasoa	18–23	21–30	39–53
1991–92	European Cup	R1	(Spain) TEKA Santander	20–15	17–27	37–42
1992–93	European Cup	L32	(Switzerland) Pfadi Winterthur	20–18	23–23	43–41
1992–93	European Cup	L16	(Italy) SSV Forst Brixen	25–16	20–22	45–38
1992–93	European Cup	QF	(Croatia) Badel 1862 Zagreb	22–21	21–26	43–47
1993–94	EHF Champions League	R1	(Belgium) Initia Hasselt	26–13	17–14	43–27
1993–94	EHF Champions League	L16	(Israel) Hapoel Rishon LeZion	28–22	30–31	58–51
1993–94	EHF Champions League	GS	(France) USAM Nîmes	26–26	22–22	1st
1993–94	EHF Champions League	GS	(Norway) Sandefjord TIF	28–22	18–28	1st
1993–94	EHF Champions League	GS	(Croatia) Badel 1862 Zagreb	24–19	21–18	1st
1993–94	EHF Champions League	F	(Spain) TEKA Santander	22–22	21–23	43–45
1994–95	EHF City Cup	L32	(Hungary) Komlói Bányász SK	14–18	21–14	35–32
1994–95	EHF City Cup	L16	(Czech Republic) HC Banik Karvina	23–17	19–16	42–33
1994–95	EHF City Cup	QF	(Iceland) Haukar Hafnarfjörður	28–16	25–28	53–44
1994–95	EHF City Cup	SF	(Spain) Cadagua Galdar	28–26	21–26	49–52
1995–96	EHF Champions League	L32	(Israel) Hapoel Rishon LeZion	34–17	30–22	64–39
1995–96	EHF Champions League	L16	(Iceland) Valur Reykjavik	29–25	23–25	52–50
1995–96	EHF Champions League	GS	(Spain) Elgorriaga Bidasoa	18–27	16–27	4th
1995–96	EHF Champions League	GS	(Germany) THW Kiel	22–26	26–25	4th
1995–96	EHF Champions League	GS	(Hungary) Fotex Veszprém SE	27–24	20–24	4th
1996–97	EHF Champions League	L32	(Israel) Hapoel Rishon LeZion	17–21	24–19	41–40
1996–97	EHF Champions League	GS	(Spain) FC Barcelona	20–23	26–34	2nd
1996–97	EHF Champions League	GS	(Ukraine) Shakhtar Donetsk	21–15	27–28	2nd
1996–97	EHF Champions League	GS	(Lithuania) Granitas Kaunas	25–20	22–16	2nd
1996–97	EHF Champions League	QF	(Croatia) Badel 1862 Zagreb	24–23	22–26	46–49
1997–98	EHF Champions League	L32	(Netherlands) Horn Sittardia	19–16	29–18	48–34
1997–98	EHF Champions League	GS	(Spain) FC Barcelona	21–21	18–32	2nd
1997–98	EHF Champions League	GS	(Israel) Hapoel Rishon LeZion	26–18	23–24	2nd
1997–98	EHF Champions League	GS	(Denmark) Virum-Sorgenfri HK	29–24	22–21	2nd
1997–98	EHF Champions League	QF	(Germany) TBV Lemgo	25–29	26–26	51–55
1998–99	EHF Champions League	L32	(Russia) Kaustik Volgograd	31–30	21–30	52–60
1999–00	EHF Cup	L32	(France) SO Chambéry	22–24	25–21	47–45
1999–00	EHF Cup	L16	(Germany) SC Magdeburg	26–23	23–24	49–47
1999–00	EHF Cup	QF	(Serbia and Montenegro) Lovćen Cetinje	26–21	24–25	50–46
1999–00	EHF Cup	SF	(Germany) SG Flensburg-Handewitt	27–23	18–23	45–46
2000–01	EHF Champions League	R2	(Iceland) Haukar Hafnarfjörður	25–22	30–28	55–50
2000–01	EHF Champions League	GS	(Germany) THW Kiel	22–21	17–30	1st
2000–01	EHF Champions League	GS	(Denmark) GOG Gudme	26–25	25–26	1st
2000–01	EHF Champions League	GS	(Italy) Pallamano Trieste	33–24	28–27	1st
2000–01	EHF Champions League	QF	(Spain) Portland San Antonio	21–24	16–25	37–49
2001–02	EHF Cup	R2	(Greece) A.C. Doukas School	26–22	20–31	46–53
2004–05	EHF Challenge Cup	R3	(Italy) Pallamano Trieste	31–25	31–28	62–53
2004–05	EHF Challenge Cup	L16	(Turkey) Milli Piyango SK	36–31	38–28	74–59
2004–05	EHF Challenge Cup	QF	(Romania) HC Minaur Baia Mare	32–22	27–31	59–53
2004–05	EHF Challenge Cup	SF	(Austria) HC Superfund Hard	33–17	27–23	60–40
2004–05	EHF Challenge Cup	F	(Switzerland) Wacker Thun	29–26	24–29	53–55
2005–06	EHF Cup	R1	(Belgium) Union Beynoise	24–19	31–24	55–43
2005–06	EHF Cup	R2	(Greece) Filippos Verias	27–28	25–21	52–49
2005–06	EHF Cup	R3	(France) US Ivry Handball	26–21	21–23	47–44
2005–06	EHF Cup	L16	(Spain) Bidasoa Irún	25–25	31–30	56–55
2006–07	EHF Champions League	QR	(North Macedonia) RK Metalurg Skopje	27–32	28–30	55–62
2006–07	EHF Cup	R2	(North Macedonia) RK Mladost Bogdanci	39–15	31–31	70–46
2006–07	EHF Cup	R3	(Spain) Bidasoa Irún	27–27	27–30	54–57
2007–08	EHF Champions League	QR	(Spain) FC Barcelona	26–28	28–37	54–65
2007–08	EHF Cup	R2	(Israel) Maccabi Rishon LeZion	29–21	31–33	60–54
2007–08	EHF Cup	R3	(Slovenia) RK Cimos Koper	27–20	25–34	52–54
2008–09	EHF Cup Winners' Cup	R2	(Czech Republic) HC Gumárny Zubří	28–25	26–25	44–50
2008–09	EHF Cup Winners' Cup	R3	(Romania) HCM Constanța	24–28	18–21	42–49
2009–10	EHF Cup Winners' Cup	R3	Cyprus College	27–26	29–26	56–52
2009–10	EHF Cup Winners' Cup	R4	(Germany) VfL Gummersbach	27–28	26–30	53–58
2010–11	EHF Challenge Cup	R3	(Serbia) RK Radnički Kragujevac	17–20	25–27	42–47
2014–15	EHF Challenge Cup	L16	(Czech Republic) Dukla Prague	42–27	32–30	74–57
2014–15	EHF Challenge Cup	QF	(Finland) Riihimäki Cocks	38–27	27–22	65–49
2014–15	EHF Challenge Cup	SF	(Norway) Stord	25–18	25–27	50–45
2014–15	EHF Challenge Cup	F	(Romania) Odorheiu Secuiesc	32–28	25–32	57–60
2015–16	EHF Challenge Cup	R2	(England) Ruislip Eagles	46–19	51–18	97–37
2015–16	EHF Challenge Cup	R3	(Romania) Odorheiu Secuiesc	25–22	24–25	50–46
2015–16	EHF Challenge Cup	L16	(Estonia) HC Kehra	40–29	45–14	85–43
2015–16	EHF Challenge Cup	QF	(Switzerland) Wacker Thun	30–23	34–34	64–57
2015–16	EHF Challenge Cup	SF	(Czech Republic) Dukla Prague	34–33	32–29	67–62
2015–16	EHF Challenge Cup	F	(Portugal) S.L. Benfica	25–29	28–22	53–51
2016–17	EHF Champions League	QT	(Israel) Maccabi Tel Aviv	34–27		
2016–17	EHF Champions League	QT	(Austria) Bregenz Handball	33–32		
2016–17	EHF Champions League	GS	(France) HBC Nantes	29–34	33–35	6th
2016–17	EHF Champions League	GS	(Denmark) Team Tvis Holstebro	32–27	29–34	6th
2016–17	EHF Champions League	GS	(Ukraine) HC Motor Zaporizhzhia	22–35	23–27	6th
2016–17	EHF Champions League	GS	(Turkey) Beşiktaş	27–28	31–33	6th
2016–17	EHF Champions League	GS	(Romania) Dinamo București	34–32	29–35	6th
2023–24	EHF European League	QR	(Slovenia) RK Trimo Trebnje	29–26	29–31	58–57
2023–24	EHF European League	GS	(Croatia) RK	30–34	28–38	3rd
2023–24	EHF European League	GS	(Slovakia) MŠK Považská Bystrica	31–26	34–26	3rd
2023–24	EHF European League	GS	(Denmark) Skjern Håndbold	25–32	25–32	3rd
2024–25	EHF European League	QR	(Spain) Abanca Ademar León	23–21	27–31	50–52
2025–26	EHF European League	QR	(Spain) Irudek Bidasoa Irún	24–30	26–35	50–65
