= C.S. Marítimo statistics and records =

Club Sport Marítimo has a long history in Portuguese football. Although the club was excluded from participating in the national championships for several years, this article includes statistics and records recorded throughout the club's history.

== Statistics ==
=== Seasons in regional competition ===
From 1916 until 1973, Marítimo competed in regional competitions due to logistical and administrative restrictions that prevented island-based clubs from entering the national Portuguese football league system. Between 1922 and 1938, Madeira was entitled to select one representative for the Campeonato de Portugal, a national knockout competition contested by regional champions. Until 1927, qualification was granted directly to the winners of the Madeira Championship, through which Marítimo earned entry and won the 1926 edition — the club’s only national title to date. From 1927 onward, Madeira’s representative was determined through a local qualification tournament, and from 1933 these qualifying rounds were expanded to include the champion of the Azores. In 1934, the Portuguese Football Federation introduced a new national league, but participation was restricted to clubs from Lisbon, Porto, Coimbra and Setúbal, thereby excluding island teams. After the Campeonato de Portugal was replaced by the Portuguese Cup in 1938, island clubs were again barred from national competition between 1941 and 1947 due to wartime transport difficulties. The league system finally opened to island-based teams in 1973, enabling Marítimo to enter national league football as champions of Madeira.

Season	League									National Championship	Portuguese Cup	Madeira Cup	Notes
Season	League	Pos	Pld	W	D	L	GF	GA	Pts	National Championship	Portuguese Cup	Madeira Cup	Notes
1916–1917	Madeira	1	7	5	2	0	19	8	12				
1917–1918	Madeira	1	4	3	1	0	–	–	7				
Did not compete between 1918 and 1921
1921–1922	Madeira	1	3	3	0	0	14	0	6				
1922–1923	Madeira	1	6	6	0	0	24	3	6	Semi-final			
1923–1924	Madeira	1	8	6	1	1	32	7	13	2nd Round			
1924–1925	Madeira	1	8	8	0	0	36	4	16	2nd Round			
1925–1926	Madeira	1	8	6	2	0	45	9	14	Winners			
1926–1927	Madeira	1	8	6	2	0	37	10	14	Quarter-final			
1927–1928	Madeira	2	8	6	0	2	32	13	12	Did not qualify			
1928–1929	Madeira	1	8	8	0	0	35	10	16	Quarter-final			
1929–1930	Madeira	1	6	5	1	0	27	9	17	Quarter-final			
1930–1931	Madeira	1	6	4	1	1	21	9	15	Semi-final			
1931–1932	Madeira	2	6	3	1	2	10	8	13	Quarter-final			
1932–1933	Madeira	1	6	4	1	1	27	5	15	Quarter-final			
Did not compete in 1933–1934 season
1934–1935	Madeira	2	6	4	0	2	15	6	14	Did not qualify			
1935–1936	Madeira	1	8	7	0	1	39	11	22	Semi-final			
1936–1937	Madeira	2	6	3	1	2	11	8	13	Quarter-final			
1937–1938	Madeira	2	4	2	0	2	12	5	8	Quarter-final			
1938–1939	Madeira	2	6	3	3	0	22	6	15		Did not qualify		
1939–1940	Madeira	1	6	4	1	1	15	9	15		Quarter-final		
1940–1941	Madeira	1	6	5	0	1	25	7	16		Did not qualify		
1941–1942	Madeira	2	6	3	3	0	20	5	15				
1942–1943	Madeira	2	6	4	0	2	14	5	14				
1943–1944	Madeira	2	6	4	2	0	14	7	16				
1944–1945	Madeira	1	6	4	2	0	9	3	16				
1945–1946	Madeira	1	6	4	0	2	13	7	14				
1946–1947	Madeira	1	6	6	0	0	16	3	18			Winners	
1947–1948	Madeira	1	6	6	0	0	32	7	18		Quarter-final	Winners	
1948–1949	Madeira	1	6	6	0	0	32	7	18		Quarter-final	Not held	
1949–1950	Madeira	1	6	5	1	0	38	3	17		Did not qualify	Winners	
1950–1951	Madeira	1	6	5	0	1	21	3	16		Quarter-final	Winners	
1951–1952	Madeira	1	6	6	0	0	33	2	18		Round of 16	Winners	
1952–1953	Madeira	1	6	5	1	0	20	2	17		Quarter-final	Winners	
1953–1954	Madeira	1	6	5	0	1	40	5	16		Quarter-final	Winners	
1954–1955	Madeira	1	6	3	3	0	19	4	9		Quarter-final	Winners	
1955–1956	Madeira	1	6	4	2	0	19	5	10		Semi-final	Winners	
1956–1957	Madeira	2	6	3	2	1	14	9	8		Round of 16		
1957–1958	Madeira	1	6	5	0	1	14	8	10		Quarter-final		
1958–1959	Madeira	3	6	2	2	2	6	5	6		Quarter-final	Winners	
1959–1960	Madeira	3	6	2	1	3	12	15	5		Did not qualify	Winners	
1960–1961	Madeira	2	6	3	2	1	10	9	8		Did not qualify		
1961–1962	Madeira	2	6	4	1	1	18	8	9		Did not qualify		
1962–1963	Madeira	2	6	2	2	2	6	7	6		Did not qualify		
1963–1964	Madeira	4	6	1	1	4	7	10	3		Did not qualify		
1964–1965	Madeira	2	6	4	0	2	12	7	8		Did not qualify		
1965–1966	Madeira	1	6	5	0	1	20	5	10		Quarter-final	Winners	
1966–1967	Madeira	1	6	5	0	1	19	3	10		Round of 16	Winners	
1967–1968	Madeira	1	6	6	0	0	12	0	12		Semi-final	Winners	
1968–1969	Madeira	2	6	3	2	1	16	5	8		Did not qualify	Winners	
1969–1970	Madeira	1	6	5	1	0	22	4	11		Round of 16	Winners	
1970–1971	Madeira	1	10	8	2	0	42	2	18		Round of 16	Winners	
1971–1972	Madeira	1	10	9	0	1	37	5	18		Round of 32	Winners	
1972–1973	Madeira	1	10	9	1	0	40	5	19		Round of 32		

=== Seasons in national competitions ===
Season	League									Portuguese Cup	League Cup	Europa League	UEFA Cup	Notes
Season	Tier	Pos	Pld	W	D	L	GF	GA	Pts	Portuguese Cup	League Cup	Europa League	UEFA Cup	Notes
1973–74	2	5	38	18	6	14	69	54	42	5th Round				First season in national league
1974–75	2	4	38	20	9	9	73	38	49	3rd Round				
1975–76	2	4	38	16	13	9	48	32	45	5th Round				
1976–77	2	↑ 1	30	18	7	5	47	18	43	2nd Round				Champions, promoted
1977–78	1	12	30	8	7	15	22	45	23	5th Round				
1978–79	1	10	30	11	5	14	36	37	27	2nd Round				
1979–80	1	11	30	9	8	13	25	37	26	Semi-final				
1980–81	1	↓ 15	30	7	9	14	33	46	23	2nd Round				Relegated
1981–82	2	↑ 1	30	18	6	6	55	23	42	5th Round				Champions, promoted
1982–83	1	↓ 14	30	8	9	13	26	38	25	3rd Round				Relegated
1983–84	2	2	30	16	11	3	51	19	43	3rd Round				
1984–85	2	↑ 1	30	23	5	2	64	15	51	Quarter-final				Promoted. Finished 1st in the Southern Zone regular season, and finished 3rd in the final phase
1985–86	1	12	30	8	6	16	26	50	22	4th Round				
1986–87	1	12	30	9	7	14	34	49	25	3rd Round				
1987–88	1	9	38	11	17	10	36	37	39	6th Round				
1988–89	1	12	38	10	15	13	40	41	35	5th Round				
1989–90	1	10	34	7	15	12	25	38	29	4th Round				
1990–91	1	10	38	12	10	16	37	48	34	6th Round				
1991–92	1	7	34	12	11	11	40	38	35	4th Round				
1992–93	1	5	34	15	7	12	56	48	37	4th Round				
1993–94	1	5	34	13	12	9	45	40	38	5th Round			1st Round	
1994–95	1	7	34	12	11	11	41	45	35	Runners-up			2nd Round	
1995–96	1	9	34	12	7	15	39	53	43	Quarter-final				
1996–97	1	8	34	13	8	13	39	38	47	5th Round				
1997–98	1	5	34	16	8	10	44	35	56	5th Round				Best league performance
1998–99	1	10	34	10	11	13	44	45	41	Quarter-final			1st Round	
1999–00	1	6	34	13	11	10	42	36	50	4th Round				
2000–01	1	11	34	12	7	15	34	37	43	Runners-up				
2001–02	1	6	34	17	5	12	48	35	56	Semi-final			1st Round	
2002–03	1	7	34	13	5	16	36	48	'44	4th Round				
2003–04	1	6	34	12	12	10	35	33	48	5th Round				
2004–05	1	7	34	12	13	9	39	32	49	Quarter-final			1st Round	
2005–06	1	10	34	10	14	10	38	37	44	Quarter-final				
2006–07	1	11	30	8	8	14	30	44	32	4th Round				
2007–08	1	5	30	14	4	12	38	26	46	6th Round	1st Round			
2008–09	1	9	30	9	10	11	35	36	37	3rd Round	3rd Round		1st Round	
2009–10	1	5	30	11	8	11	42	43	41	3rd Round	2nd Round			
2010–11	1	9	30	9	8	13	33	32	35	4th Round	3rd Round	Play-off		
2011–12	1	5	30	14	8	8	41	38	50	Quarter-final	3rd Round			
2012–13	1	10	30	9	11	10	34	45	38	5th Round	3rd Round	Group stage		
2013–14	1	6	30	11	8	11	40	44	41	5th Round	3rd Round			
2014–15	1	9	34	12	8	14	46	45	44	Quarter-final	Runners-up			
2015–16	1	13	34	10	5	19	45	63	35	4th Round	Runners-up			
2016–17	1	6	34	13	11	10	34	32	50	4th Round	3rd Round			
2017–18	1	7	34	13	8	13	36	49	47	5th Round	3rd Round	Play-off		
2018–19	1	11	34	12	3	19	26	44	39	4th Round	3rd Round			
2019–20	1	11	34	9	12	13	34	42	39	3rd Round	3rd Round			
2020–21	1	15	34	10	5	19	27	47	35	Quarter-final				Didn't play League Cup
2021–22	1	10	34	9	11	14	39	44	38	3rd Round	1st Round			
2022–23	1	↓ 16	34	7	5	22	32	63	26	3rd Round	1st Round			Relegated
2023–24	2	4	34	18	10	6	52	29	64	4th Round	1st Round			
2024–25	2	12	34	10	13	11	42	48	43	1st Round				
2025–26	2	↑ 1	34	20	6	8	50	29	66	2nd Round				Champions, promoted

=== Key ===
- 1D = 1 Division
- 2D = 2 Division
- Pos = Final position
- P = Games played
- W = Games won
- D = Games drawn
- L = Games lost
- GS = Goals score
- GA = Goals against
- Pts = Points
- CP = Campeonato de Portugal (Championship of Portugal)
- TP = Taça de Portugal (Portuguese Cup)
- TL = Taça da Liga (Portuguese League Cup)
- UEL = UEFA Europa League

Winners (W)	Runners-up (RU)	Semi-final (SF)	Promoted ↑	Relegated ↓

» NOTES

- Club Sport Marítimo began participation in the national championship in 1973–74.
- Club Sport Marítimo began participation in the Taça de Portugal in 1939–40.
- The League Cup tournament began in 2007–08.
- Last update: 24 May 2026

== Top goalscorers by season ==
Years	Name	Appearances	Goals
2025–26	(Portugal) Carlos Daniel	33	11
2024–25	(Portugal) Martim Tavares	30	7
2023–24	(Brazil) Lucas Silva	33	12
2022–23	(Portugal) André Vidigal	32	8
2021–22	(Cameroon) Joel Tagueu	24	9
2020–21	(Brazil) Rodrigo Pinho	18	9
2020–21	(Cameroon) Joel Tagueu	32	9
2019–20	(Brazil) Rodrigo Pinho	27	9
2018–19	(Cameroon) Joel Tagueu	30	8
2017–18	(Cameroon) Joel Tagueu	15	9
2016–17	(Brazil) Raul Silva	29	7
2015–16	(Brazil) Dyego Sousa	28	12
2014–15	(Niger) Moussa Maâzou	18	9
2013–14	(Brazil) Derley	30	16
2012–13	(Guinea-Bissau) Leocísio Sami	29	6
2011–12	(Senegal) Baba Diawara	15	10
2010–11	(Senegal) Baba Diawara	29	11
2009–10	(Brazil) Kléber	20	8
2008–09	(Senegal) Baba Diawara	25	10
2007–08	(Portugal) Ariza Makukula	16	7
2006–07	(Zambia) Collins Mbesuma	23	7
2006–07	(Uruguay) Marcelo Lipatin	26	7
2005–06	(Brazil) Kanú	25	8
2004–05	(Brazil) Pena	25	9
2003–04	(Brazil) Alan	34	9
2002–03	(Brazil) Gaúcho	32	15
2001–02	(Brazil) Gaúcho	30	15
2000–01	(Argentina) Lagorio	16	8
2000–01	(Portugal) Quim	21	8
1999–00	(Argentina) Mariano Toedtli	31	13
1998–99	(Canada) Alex Bunbury	30	15
1997–98	(Canada) Alex Bunbury	30	11
1996–97	(Canada) Alex Bunbury	26	8
1995–96	(Canada) Alex Bunbury	26	10
1994–95	(Portugal) Paulo Alves	33	14
1993–94	(Brazil) Jorge Andrade	27	11
1992–93	(Brazil) Edmilson	30	11
1992–93	(Brazil) Jorge Andrade	32	11
1991–92	(Brazil) Edmilson	27	10
1990–91	(Barbados) Peter Hinds	30	10
1989–90	(Portugal) António Oliveira	19	4
1989–90	(Brazil) Paulo Ricardo	27	4
1988–89	(Portugal) Jorge Silva	38	15
1987–88	(Portugal) Jorge Silva	35	10
1986–87	(Northern Ireland) Colin Hill	27	8
1985–86	(Portugal) Vítor Madeira	15	5

» NOTES

- The data used is since the last promotion to the I League in 1985
- Last update: 21 June 2024

== Top 10 goalscorers ==
Competitive, professional matches only in all competitions.

No.	Name	Years	Appearances	Goals	Average
1.	(Canada) Alex Bunbury	1993–1999	185	65	0.35
2.	(Brazil) Edmilson	1991–1997	158	53	0.34
3.	(Senegal) Baba Diawara	2007–2012; 2015–2016	157	52	0.33
4.	(Cameroon) Joel Tagueu	2018–2023	147	41	0.28
5.	(Brazil) Gaúcho	2001–2004	96	39	0.41
6.	(Brazil) Rodrigo Pinho	2017–2021	118	39	0.33
7.	(Brazil) Heitor	1991–1995	135	27	0.20
8.	(Portugal) Jorge Silva	1987–1989	76	26	0.34
9.	(Brazil) Jorge Andrade	1991–1994	73	24	0.33
10.	(Brazil) Dyego Sousa	2014–2017	79	24	0.30

» NOTES

- The data used is since the last promotion to the I League in 1985
- A player's name in **bold** denotes active player
- Last update 10 February 2025

== Top 10 appearances ==
Competitive, professional matches only. Appearances as substitute (in parentheses) included in total.

No.	Name	Years	League	Cup	League Cup	Europe	Total
1.	(Portugal) Briguel	2000–2016	254 (23)	28 (2)	14 (0)	16 (0)	**312** (25)
2.	(Portugal) Carlos Jorge	1985–1992; 1994–2001	293 (26)	2 (1)	(0)	6 (0)	**301** (27)
3.	(Brazil) Ewerton	1986–1996	248 (0)	2 (0)	0 (0)	2 (0)	**252** (0)
4.	(Portugal) Zeca	1992–2005	216 (45)	10 (1)	0 (0)	9 (1)	**235** (47)
5.	(Brazil) Marcos	2003–2009	200 (0)	8 (0)	3 (0)	4 (0)	**215** (0)
6.	(Portugal) Bruno	1993–2002; 2007–2010	182 (16)	9 (1)	3	6 (1)	**200** (18)
7.	(Portugal) Eusébio	1992–2005	173 (15)	9 (0)	0 (0)	7 (1)	**189** (16)
8.	(Portugal) Albertino	1997–2004	169 (18)	14 (0)	0 (0)	4 (0)	**187** (18)
9.	(Netherlands) Mitchell van der Gaag	2001–2006	154 (0)	14 (0)	0 (0)	6 (0)	**174** (0)
10.	(Canada) Alex Bunbury	1993–1999	165 (5)	2 (0)	0 (0)	6 (0)	**173** (5)

» NOTES

- The data used is since the last promotion to the I League in 1985
- A player's name in **bold** denotes active player
- Last update 18 January 2016

== International players ==
=== Portugal ===
Name	Years	Caps	Goals	First Cap	Score	Stadium	Date
(Portugal) José Ramos	1925–1930	1	0	France vs Portugal	4–2	Stade des Ponts Jumeaux	1926-04-18
(Portugal) Pinga	1929–1930	1	0	Portugal vs. Spain	0–1	Estádio do Ameal	1930-11-30
(Portugal) António Teixeira	1925–1932	1	0	Portugal vs. Italy	0–2	Estádio do Lima	1931-04-12
(Portugal) Eduardo Luís	1974–1975; 1976–1982	1	0	Italy vs. Portugal	3–1	Stadio Luigi Ferraris	1980-09-24
(Portugal) António Oliveira	1982–1983; 1987–1990	6	1	Portugal vs. Brazil	0–4	Estádio Municipal de Coimbra	1983-06-08
(Portugal) Adelino Nunes	1988–1990	10	2	Sweden vs. Portugal	0–0	Ullevi Stadium	1988-10-12
(Portugal) Jorge Silva	1987–1989	1	0	Portugal vs. Switzerland	3–1	Estádio da Luz	1989-04-26
(Portugal) Paulo Madeira	1993–1994	1	0	Portugal vs. Norway	0–0	Ullevaal Stadion	1994-04-24
(Portugal) Paulo Alves	1992–1995	5	3	Latvian (Latvia) vs. Portugal	1–3	Stadions Daugavas	1994-10-09
(Portugal) Vado	1991–1995	2	0	Canada vs. Portugal	1–1	Varsity Stadium	1995-01-26
(Portugal) Ariza Makukula	2007–2008	3	1	Kazakhstan vs. Portugal	1–2	Almaty Central Stadium	2007-10-17
(Portugal) Danilo Pereira	2013–2015	2	0	Portugal vs. Cape Verde	0–2	António Coimbra da Mota	2015-03-31

» NOTES

- Last update: 16 June 2015

=== Other nations ===
Name	Years	Caps	Goals	First Cap	Score	Stadium	Date
(Nigeria) Sylvanus Okpala	1984–1985	2	0	Nigeria vs. Tunisia	1–0	National Stadium	1985-07-06
(Zambia) Webster Chikabala	1990–1991	1	0	Angola vs. Zambia	1–2	Estádio da Cidadela	1991-04-14
(Canada) Alex Bunbury	1993–1999	23	6	Canada vs Denmark	0–1	Varsity Stadium	1995-01-24
(Canada) Fernando Aguiar	1994–1995	1	0	Canada vs Portugal	1–1	Varsity Stadium	1995-01-26
(Zaire) Eshele Botende	1996–1997	1	0	Zaire vs. South Africa	1–2	Stade Municipal	1997-04-27
(Bulgaria) Ilian Iliev	1999–2002	6	1	Bulgaria vs. Slovakia	1–1	Playa Ancha Stadium	2000-02-09
(Guinea-Bissau) Lino	1998–2003	2	0	Guinea-Bissau vs. Togo	0–0	Estádio 24 de Setembro	2000-04-08
(Liberia) Musa Shannon	1999–2001	12	1	Chad vs. Liberia	0–0	Samuel Kanyon Doe	2000-04-23
(Angola) Chinguila	1999–2002	3	0	South Africa vs. Angola	1–0	Mmabatho Stadium	2002-01-15
(Slovenia) Andrej Komac	2005–2006	4	0	Wales vs. Slovenia	0–0	Liberty Stadium	2005-08-17
(Zambia) Collins Mbesuma	2006–2007	2	0	Zambia vs. South Africa	0–1	Independence Stadium	2006-10-08
(Chile) Alex von Schwedler	2006–2007	1	0	Brazil vs. Chile	4–0	Ullevi	2007-03-24
(Venezuela) Edder Pérez	2007–2008	1	0	Paraguay vs. Venezuela	1–1	Antonio Oddone Sarubbi	2007-08-23
(Angola) Djalma	2006–2011	12	1	Venezuela vs. Angola	0–0	Estadio La Carolina	2008-11-19
(Senegal) Baba Diawara	2007–2012; 2015–2016	1	0	Senegal vs. (Democratic Republic of the Congo) Congo DR	2–1	Stade des Allées	2009-08-12
(Cape Verde) Héldon	2010–2013	21	8	Cape Verde vs. Mali	1–0	Estádio da Várzea	2010-09-04
(Cape Verde) Sidnei	2006–2011	3	0	Zimbabwe vs. Cape Verde	0–0	Rufaro Stadium	2010-10-10
(Guinea-Bissau) Leocísio Sami	2009–2014	7	0	Kenya vs. Guinea-Bissau	2–1	Nyayo National Stadium	2011-09-03
(Cape Verde) Gegé	2012–2015	20	1	Cape Verde vs. Cameroon	2–0	Estádio da Várzea	2012-09-08
(Cape Verde) Nuno Rocha	2013–2014	1	0	Luxembourg vs. Cape Verde	0–0	Stade Josy Barthel	2014-03-05
(Niger) Moussa Maâzou	2014–2015	4	1	Niger vs. Cape Verde	1–3	Général Seyni Kountché	2014-09-06
(Mali) Moussa Marega	2015–2016	5	0	Mali vs. Gabon	3–4	Stade Pierre Brisson	2015-03-25
(Liberia) Theo Weeks	2013–2015	1	0	Togo vs. Liberia	2–1	Stade de Kégué	2015-06-14
(Armenia) Gevorg Ghazaryan	2015–2018	12	1	Serbia vs. Armenia	2–0	Karađorđe Stadium	2015-09-04
(Curaçao) Gevaro	2016–2017	6	1	Barbados vs. Curaçao	1–0	Usain Bolt Sports	2016-03-23
(Angola) Pana	2013–2016	3	1	Congo DR (Democratic Republic of the Congo) vs. Angola	2–1	Stade des Martyrs	2016-03-26
(São Tomé and Príncipe) Marcos Barbeiro	2014–2017	2	0	São Tomé (São Tomé and Príncipe) vs. Cape Verde	1–2	Estádio Nacional 12 de Julho	2016-06-14
(Iran) Alireza Haghighi	2016	1	0	Iran vs. Kyrgyzstan	6–0	Azadi Stadium	2016-06-07
(Guinea) Alhassane Keita	2017	2	0	Guinea vs. Gabon	2–2	Stade Océane	2017-03-24
(Mozambique) Zainadine Júnior	2017–2024	21	1	Mozambique vs. Angola	2–0	Estádio do Zimpeto	2017-03-25
(Mozambique) Gildo	2017–2020	2	0	Mozambique vs. Kenya	1–1	Estádio do Zimpeto	2017-09-02
(Cape Verde) Diney	2014–2018	2	0	Burkina Faso vs. Cape Verde	4–0	Stade du 4 Août	2017-11-14
(Iran) Amir Abedzadeh	2017–2021	5	0	Iran vs. Uzbekistan	1–0	Azadi Stadium	2018-05-19
(Cameroon) Joel Tagueu	2018–2023	6	1	Cameroon vs. Burkina Faso	0–1	Stade Pierre Brisson	2018-05-27
(Guinea-Bissau) Nanu	2015–2020	7	1	Angola vs. Guinea-Bissau	2–0	Estádio Municipal 25 de Abril	2019-06-08
(Mozambique) Bonera	2018–2021	6	1	Guinea-Bissau vs. Mozambique	1–0	Estádio Municipal de Óbidos	2020-10-08
(Angola) Milson	2019–2022	2	0	Angola vs. Mozambique	3–0	Estádio Municipal de Rio Maior	2020-10-13
(Cyprus) Andreas Karo	2021	2	0	Hungary vs. Cyprus	1–0	Szusza Ferenc Stadion	2021-06-04
(Mozambique) Amâncio Canhembe	2021–2022	1	0	Mozambique vs. Ivory Coast	0–0	Estádio do Zimpeto	2021-09-03
(Mozambique) Clésio	2021–2023	5	0	Ivory Coast vs. Mozambique	3–0	Stade de l'Amitié	2021-11-13
(Mauritius) Dylan Collard	2020–2024	8	1	São Tomé (São Tomé and Príncipe) vs. Mauritius	1–0	Côte d’Or	2022-03-24
(Peru) Percy Liza	2022–2023	2	0	Peru vs. Bolivia	1–0	Estádio de la UNSA	2022-11-19
(Mozambique) Geny Catamo	2022–2023	1	1	Rwanda vs. Mozambique	0–2	Stade Huye	2023-06-18
(Guinea-Bissau) Nito Gomes	2022–2025	3	1	Guinea-Bissau vs. (Sierra Leone) Sierra Leona	2–1	Estádio 24 de Setembro	2023-09-11
(Cape Verde) Diogo Mendes	2021–2024	4	0	Cape Verde vs. Comoros	1–0	Stade du Molleton	2023-10-17
(Mozambique) Kimiss Zavala	2024–	2	0	Chad vs. Mozambique	2–2	Berrechid	2025-11-17
(Republic of the Congo) Mons Bassouamina	2026–	2	0	Namibia vs. (Republic of the Congo) Congo	1–0	Botswana	2026-09-23

» NOTES

- Last update: 6 November 2026
