= Portuguese Handball Federation =

Governing body for handball in Portugal

Handball Federation of Portugal Portuguese: Federação de Andebol de Portugal FPA
- Sport: Handball
- Other sports: Beach handball; Wheelchair handball
- Official website: www.fpa.pt
- Year of formation: 1 May 1939; 87 years ago
- International federation: International Handball Federation (Full member since 11 July 1946; 80 years ago)
- Continental association: European Handball Federation (Full member since 17 November 1991; 34 years ago)
- National Olympic Committee: Olympic Committee of Portugal (POR)
- Other affiliation(s): Mediterranean Handball Confederation
- President: Luís Miguel Morgado Laranjeiro (Portugal)
- Address: Calçada da Ajuda, 63/69 Apartado 3346, 1301-971, Lisbon

The Handball Federation of Portugal (Portuguese: Federação de Andebol de Portugal) (FPA) is the national handball association in Portugal. FPA is a full member of the European Handball Federation (EHF) and the International Handball Federation (IHF).

The organisation oversees the national teams that represent Portugal in the international handball competitions, as well as all the club competitions within the country.

It also runs the derivate forms of the sport in Portugal, namely beach handball and adapted handball.

== History ==
The Handball Federation of Portugal was founded on 1 May 1939 as Federação Portuguesa de Andebol (in English, Portuguese Handball Federation), by means of the handball associations of Porto, Coimbra and Lisbon.

At first, the federation established the nationwide rules of handball in its 11-a-side variant. The 7-a-side handball was introduced in Portugal in 1949.

In 1946, FPA became one of the founding members of the International Handball Federation. Later, in 1991, FPA also became a founding member of the European Handball Federation, which succeeded the IHF.

During the first decade of the 21st century, the Federation held a legal and lobby dispute with the Liga Portuguesa de Clubes de Andebol, a short-lived independent organisation that sought to oversee the professional club handball in Portugal. Since 2008, it again became the sole governing body of handball in Portugal.

== Competitions organized ==
=== Men's handball ===
==== League competitions ====
- Andebol 1
- Segunda Divisão
- Terceira Divisão

==== Cup competitions ====
- Taça de Portugal
- Super Taça

=== Women's handball ===
- Campeonato Nacional da 1ª Divisão - Feminino
- Taça de Portugal
- Taça FAP
- Super Taça

== Teams ==
- Portugal men's national handball team
- Portugal women's national handball team

== Honours ==
=== Men's ===
- World Men's Handball Championship:

4th in 2025

- IHF World Junior Championship:

(silver) 2nd in 2025

(bronze) 3rd in 1995

- European Men's Handball Championship:

5th in 2026

- EHF European Men's U-20:

(silver) 2nd in 2010, 2022, 2024

- EHF European Men's U-18:

(gold) Winners in 1992

(silver) 2nd in 1994

=== Women's ===
- European Women's Handball Championship:

16th in 2008

- EHF European Women's U-19:

4th in 2023
