= Académico do Funchal =

Portuguese handball club

- Full name: Académico Clube Desportivo do Funchal
- Short name: ACDF
- Founded: 1 February 1971
- Arena: Pavilhão Bartolomeu Perestrelo; Funchal, Madeira
- Capacity: 250
- Club colours
| Home | Away |

Académico Clube Desportivo do Funchal (ACDF), commonly known as Académico do Funchal, is a Portuguese sports club based in Funchal, Madeira. Founded on 1 February 1971, the club has participated in several sports, most notably handball, in which its men's and women's teams achieved national success during the 1990s.

The women's handball team won the Portuguese championship in 1997–98, three consecutive Portuguese Cups between 1992–93 and 1994–95, and the Portuguese Super Cup in 1996–97. The men's team won the national Second Division championship in 1995–96 and subsequently competed in the Portuguese First Division.

In 1998, Académico became a founding partner in two separate sporting companies: the men's Académico Marítimo Madeira Andebol SAD, established with C.S. Marítimo, and the women's Madeira Andebol SAD, established with Club Sports da Madeira and Clube Desportivo Infante Dom Henrique. The club subsequently concentrated on youth handball before returning to independent senior men's national competition in 2022.

== History ==
=== Foundation and development (1971–1990) ===
Académico was founded on 1 February 1971 as Clube Desportivo Madeirense by José Manuel Freitas de Silva and a group of local sports enthusiasts. Initially involved in football, the club subsequently adopted the names Académico de Fátima and Académico Clube Desportivo do Funchal. Handball and volleyball were introduced during its early development, with João Coutinho playing an important role in establishing the handball section.

Handball became the club's principal sport, with men's and women's teams competing in regional and national championships. Académico developed a youth training programme and established the Madeira Handball International Tournament in 1985. The competition brought together youth teams from Madeira, mainland Portugal and other countries, becoming an established event in the island's sporting calendar.

Participating teams came from countries including Angola, Brazil, Canada, Denmark, France, Germany, Hungary, Italy, Poland, Russia and Switzerland. The tournament was organised by Académico until 2019.

=== National success (1990–1998) ===
Académico emerged as one of Madeira's leading handball clubs during the 1990s. Its women's team won three consecutive Portuguese Cups from 1992–93 to 1994–95, the Portuguese Super Cup in 1996–97 and the national championship in 1997–98. The team also participated in European competitions, including the EHF Cup and EHF Cup Winners' Cup.

The men's team won the national Second Division championship in 1995–96, securing promotion to the First Division. It finished sixth in both 1996–97 and 1997–98.

=== Formation of Madeira Andebol SAD (1998) ===
By the late 1990s, the Madeira region had several successful senior handball teams competing at national level. Maintaining competitive squads and participating in mainland Portuguese and European competitions required substantial financial and organisational resources. Two separate sporting organisations were established in 1998 to consolidate the senior handball activities of the island's leading clubs and strengthen Madeira's representation in national and international competitions.

In men's handball, Académico joined C.S. Marítimo to establish Académico Marítimo Madeira Andebol SAD. The new professional team succeeded Académico in its Portuguese First Division competition registration, taking over its position in the national championship. The arrangement brought together the clubs' involvement in senior handball within a jointly managed sporting project.

The women's Madeira Andebol SAD was established separately by Académico, Club Sports da Madeira and Clube Desportivo Infante Dom Henrique. It brought together the senior women's handball activities of its founding clubs, building on their recent domestic success. Académico had won the 1997–98 national championship, while Club Sports da Madeira had won four consecutive titles between 1994 and 1997.

The restructuring also helped address financial difficulties within Académico. By transferring its senior sporting rights to the two professional organisations, Académico was able to reorganise its activities and concentrate on recruiting and developing young players. The men's and women's SADs remained legally separate organisations, while Académico continued as an independent sports club.

=== Youth development and withdrawal from the men's Madeira SAD project (1998–2022) ===
Following the establishment of the two professional Madeira SAD organisations, Académico concentrated primarily on youth development while retaining an ownership interest in both senior sporting projects. In 2000, the club considered entering an independent senior team in a proposed new national competition, although the plan was not confirmed. Académico continued its youth development activities and renovated its sports training centre in 2009.

By the early 2020s, the men's Madeira SAD project had experienced declining competitiveness, organisational demotivation and reduced investment in its playing squad. Financial contributions had become increasingly unbalanced between its founding partners, with Marítimo providing substantially greater funding than Académico. The growing investment in Portuguese handball by Porto, Benfica and Sporting also increased the resources required to compete at the highest level.

A reorganisation of A.M. Madeira Andebol SAD was agreed between the two founding clubs in 2022. Marítimo assumed control of the men's professional First Division organisation, seeking to integrate the team more closely into its existing sporting infrastructure and attract greater financial and supporter backing. Académico, meanwhile, returned to independent senior men's competition, providing a progression route from its youth teams to senior national handball.

The existing sporting company continued with Marítimo subsequently holding 99% of its shares and Académico retaining a 1% minority interest. The women's Madeira Andebol SAD organisation remained a separate and was unaffected by the men's restructuring.

=== Return to senior men's competition (2022–present) ===
Académico returned to senior men's national competition in 2022–23, taking over the Second Division position previously occupied by Marítimo's independent handball team. The reconstituted squad retained several former Marítimo players and was coached by Rui Quintas, assisted by José Santos.

In its first season, Académico finished third in Zone 3 of the Second Division, securing a place in the newly established Divisão de Honra, which became the second tier of Portuguese men's handball in 2023–24.

Académico finished fifth in the regular phase of the inaugural Divisão de Honra season in 2023–24, qualifying for the six-team promotion group after defeating Benfica B 23–20 in its final regular-season match. The team subsequently finished sixth in the promotion group.

In 2024–25, with Duarte Filipe appointed head coach, Académico finished seventh in the regular phase of the Divisão de Honra and subsequently placed second in the six-team relegation group, retaining its place in the division. The club also reached the round of 32 of the Portuguese Cup.

Académico remained in the Divisão de Honra in 2025–26, finishing eleventh in the regular phase before placing second in the relegation group. The team recorded 13 wins, one draw and 18 defeats across its 32 league matches, ending the season with a 32–27 away victory against Xico Andebol.

== Honours ==
The following honours were won by Académico's independent senior handball teams, excluding titles subsequently won by the two professional Madeira SAD organisations.

=== Men's handball ===
- Portuguese Second Division
  - Winners (1): 1995–96

=== Women's handball ===
- Portuguese Women's Handball Championship
  - Winners (1): 1997–98
- Portuguese Women's Handball Cup
  - Winners (3): 1992–93, 1993–94, 1994–95
- Portuguese Women's Super Cup
  - Winners (1): 1996–97

== European record ==
Académico's women's team participated in European competitions during the 1990s, before the establishment of Madeira Andebol SAD.

| Season | Competition | Furthest stage |
|---|---|---|
| 1993–94 | Women's EHF Cup Winners' Cup | Round of 32 |
| 1994–95 | Women's EHF Cup Winners' Cup | Round of 16 |
| 1995–96 | Women's EHF Cup Winners' Cup | Round of 32 |
| 1996–97 | Women's EHF Cup Winners' Cup | Round of 16 |
| 1997–98 | Women's EHF Cup | Round of 32 |

== See also ==
- A.M. Madeira Andebol SAD
- Madeira Andebol SAD
- C.S. Marítimo (handball)
- Portuguese Women's Handball Championship
- Portuguese Handball League
