= C.S. Marítimo (disambiguation) =

C.S. Marítimo may refer to:

- C.S. Marítimo, a football club from Funchal, Madeira
- C.S. Marítimo (futsal)
- C.S. Marítimo (handball)
- C.S. Maritimo (volleyball)
