= Portuguese Handball Third Division =

Terceira Divisão Portuguesa
- Founded: 1978
- No. of teams: 39
- Country: Portugal
- Confederation: EHF
- Most recent champion: AD Carvalhos (2023–24)
- Most titles: Dramático Cascais; Fermentões; Académico AC (2)
- Level on pyramid: 4
- Promotion to: Second Division
- Relegation to: Regional Championship's
- Website: Federação Andebol

Portuguese Handball Third Division or "Terceira Divisão Portuguese" is the third handball league in Portugal. The best teams get promoted to Portuguese Handball Second Division.

Due to some disputes between the League and the Federation, between 2001 and 2006 Portuguese Handball Third Division or "3a Divisão Portuguesa" was the fourth handball league in Portugal.

With the ending of the League, Portuguese Handball Third Division re-assumed the position of third handball league in Portugal.

== Champions ==
=== Portuguese Handball Third Division ===
- 1978/1979 : Dramatico Cascais
- 1979/1980 : Dramatico Cascais (2)
- 1980/1981 : Salgueiros
- 1981/1982 : Pedro Nunes
- 1982/1983 : Boa Hora
- 1983/1984 : GD TAP
- 1984/1985 : Império Cruzeiro
- 1985/1986 : FC Gaia
- 1986/1987 : GS Loures
- 1987/1988 : AD Fafe
- 1988/1989 : Ginasio do Sul
- 1989/1990 : Estrelas da Avenida
- 1990/1991 : Académico FC
- 1991/1992 : FC Maia
- 1992/1993 : Fermentões
- 1993/1994 : Ginásio Clube de Odivelas
- 1994/1995 : Juve Lis
- 1995/1996 : Aguas Santas
- 1996/1997 : Quintajense
- 1997/1998 : Fermentões (2)
- 1998/1999 : Ilhavo AC
- 1999/2000 : Olivais e Moscavide
- 2000/2001 : Académico FC (2)
- 2001/2002 : Sanjoanense
- 2002/2003 : CDE Camões
- 2003/2004 : Callidas Clube
- 2004/2005 : Empregados Comércio
- 2005/2006 : AC Sismaria
- 2006/2007 : Evóra AC
- 2007/2008 : Alto Moinho
- 2008/2009 : Paço de Arcos

Year	Champion	TN	Second Place	Third Place	References
2009–10	Vitória de Setubal	1	Paço d'Arcos	Santana	
2010–11	Infesta	1	Vela Tavira	Benavente	
2011–12	Boa Hora	2	Modicus	Ílhavo	
2012–13	Benfica B	1	Sanjoanense	Salgueiros & Torrense	
2013–14	Arsenal de Devesa	1	Loures	Almada & Boavista	
2014–15	Estarreja	1	Juventude de Lis	Horta B	
2015–16	Albicastrense	1	Santo Tirso B	Marítimo	
2016–17	Sassoeiros	1	Natação	Marítimo	
2017–18	Modicus	1	Lagoa	Marítimo	
2018–19	Estarreja	2	Sporting B	Marítimo	
2019–20	No champion due to COVID-19 pandemic				
2020–21	Vitória SC	1	Avanca B	Belenenses B	
2021–22	Gondomar Cultural	1	LX50	Naval	
2022–23	FC Gaia B	1	SIR 1º de Maio	Esfera Andebol Masters	
2023–24	AD Carvalhos/Sernox	1	CSS Pinhal Frades	GC Tarouca	

Note:
TN: Titles Number

== See also ==
Men's

- Andebol 1
- Second Division
- Taça de Portugal
- Supertaça
- Youth Honors

Women's

- First Division
- Taça de Portugal
- Supertaça
- Youth Honors (Women)
