= Madeira Andebol SAD =

Portuguese handball club

- Full name: Madeira Andebol SAD
- Short name: Madeira SAD
- Founded: September 29, 1998
- Arena: Pavilhão Bartolomeu Perestrelo; Funchal, Madeira
- Capacity: 250
- League: 1ª Divisão de Andebol Feminino
- Club colours
Home	Away

Madeira Andebol SAD is a Portuguese women's handball club based in Funchal, Madeira. Founded on 29 September 1998 by Académico do Funchal, Club Sports da Madeira and Clube Desportivo Infante Dom Henrique, the club competes in the Campeonato Nacional da 1.ª Divisão Feminina, the highest division of women's handball in Portugal.

Madeira SAD is one of the most successful clubs in Portuguese women's handball. Since its foundation, it has won 15 national championships and 20 Portuguese Cups, including eleven consecutive league titles between 1998 and 2009 and seventeen consecutive Portuguese Cups between 1998 and 2015. The club has also won more than twenty Portuguese Super Cups.

The club has participated in European competitions including the Women's EHF Champions League, Women's EHF Cup and Women's EHF European Cup.

Madeira Andebol SAD is a separate organisation from the men's A.M. Madeira Andebol SAD, which was established in 1998 by Académico do Funchal and C.S. Marítimo. The men's sporting company adopted Marítimo's identity in 2022, while the women's Madeira SAD continued operating independently.

== History ==
=== Foundation and early success (1998–2002) ===
Madeira Andebol SAD was founded on 29 September 1998 as a joint sporting project involving three Madeira-based clubs; Académico Clube Desportivo do Funchal, Club Sports da Madeira and Clube Desportivo Infante Dom Henrique. The organisation was created to consolidate the clubs' senior women's handball activities within a sporting company while maintaining a competitive team at national and European level. The three founding clubs had previously competed at the highest level of Portuguese women's handball, with Académico and Club Sports da Madeira both having won major domestic honours; Club Sports da Madeira had won four consecutive national championships between 1993–94 and 1996–97, while Académico do Funchal won the title in 1997–98.

The new club continued this winning tradition, claiming the national championship, Portuguese Cup and Portuguese Super Cup in its inaugural 1998–99 season. The club also made its European debut in 1998–99, facing Norwegian side Byåsen in the EHF Women's Champions League.

The team retained the Portuguese championship in 1999–2000 and continued its domestic dominance in the following seasons, winning successive league, cup and Super Cup titles.

=== Domestic dominance (2002–2009) ===
Madeira SAD established itself as the dominant team in Portuguese women's handball during the 2000s. The club won eleven consecutive national championships from 1998–99 to 2008–09. During the same period, it also won the Portuguese Cup every season and continued its sequence of Super Cup victories.

The team's domestic achievements were accompanied by regular appearances in European competition, including the Champions League and EHF Cup. In the 2002–03 EHF Cup, Madeira SAD faced Hungarian side Debrecen VSC, winning 34–28 at home before losing 29–22 away and being eliminated 57–56 on aggregate.

The run of consecutive national championships ended in 2009–10, when Gil Eanes won the title. Madeira SAD nevertheless retained the Portuguese Cup and Super Cup in that season.

=== Continued cup success (2009–2015) ===
Madeira SAD remained one of Portugal's leading women's teams during the early 2010s. The club regained the national championship in 2011–12, ending a two-season period in which Gil Eanes had won the league.

Although Alavarium became the leading league team between 2012–13 and 2014–15, Madeira SAD continued its uninterrupted Portuguese Cup-winning sequence. In 2014–15, the club won the Portuguese Cup for the seventeenth consecutive season, extending a run that had begun with its foundation in 1998.

=== Further championships (2015–2021) ===
Madeira SAD won its thirteenth national championship in 2015–16, before adding a fourteenth in 2017–18. The 2017–18 season also brought another Portuguese Cup victory, ending the club's two-season absence from the competition's list of winners.

The team continued competing in the First Division and represented Portugal in European competitions, including the 2016–17 EHF Cup, in which it faced French club Brest Bretagne Handball.

The 2019–20 domestic season was disrupted by the COVID-19 pandemic, with no national championship or Portuguese Cup winner declared however Madeira SAD returned to winning ways in the following 2020–21 season, claiming its fifteenth Portuguese championship and nineteenth Portuguese Cup.

=== Recent seasons (2021–present) ===
Madeira SAD remained a leading participant in the Portuguese First Division following the emergence of Benfica as a major rival for domestic honours.

In 2022–23, the club won the inaugural Taça Federação de Andebol de Portugal, a national competition introduced that season. The team also reached the quarter-finals of the EHF European Cup. Madeira SAD eliminated SSV Brixen Südtirol, IBV Vestmannaeyjar and LK Zug before facing Spanish side Atlético Guardés. The Madeiran team lost 30–26 at home and won 24–21 away, being eliminated 51–50 on aggregate.

In 2023–24, Madeira SAD won its twentieth Portuguese Cup, defeating Benfica 36–34 after extra time in the final on 2 June 2024. The victory ended Benfica's two-season run as cup winners. The club also competed in the 2023–24 EHF European Cup, reaching the round of 16 before being eliminated by eventual champions Elche of Spain.

On 21 December 2024, Madeira SAD defeated Benfica 20–18 in the Portuguese Super Cup final in Funchal, securing another national trophy after a five-year absence from the competition's list of winners.

In the 2024–25 EHF European Cup, Madeira SAD eliminated Greek side Anagennisi Artas and Turkish club Üsküdar before losing to Czech side Házená Kynžvart in the round of 16. The club again reached the last 16 of the EHF European Cup in 2025–26, defeating Kosovo's KHF Istogu in the third round before being eliminated by Greek side PAOK.

== Squad ==
- (Serbia) Barbara Brauer
- (Portugal) Cilisia Camacho
- (Portugal) Carla Coimbra
- (Portugal) Ana Estacio
- (Portugal) Carla Ferreira
- (Portugal) Micaela Freitas
- (Portugal) Mariela Gonçalves
- (Portugal) Esmeralda Gouveia
- (Portugal) Sonia Leites
- (Serbia) Tanja Milanović
- (Portugal) Claudia Novais
- (Portugal) Ana Seabra
- (Portugal) Renata Tavares
- (Portugal) Maria Viana
- (Portugal) Cristina Vieira

== Honours ==
- Portuguese Women's Championship: 19
  - 1998–99, 1999–00, 2000–01, 2001–02, 2002–03, 2003–04, 2004–05, 2005–06, 2006–07, 2007–08, 2008–09, 2009–10, 2010–11, 2011–12, 2013–14, 2014–15, 2017–18, 2020–21, 2023–24
- Portuguese Women's Handball Cup: 20
  - 1998–99, 1999–00, 2000–01, 2001–02, 2002–03, 2003–04, 2004–05, 2005–06, 2006–07, 2007–08, 2008–09, 2009–10, 2010–11, 2011–12, 2012–13, 2013–14, 2014–15, 2017–18, 2020–21, 2023–24
- Supertaça de Portugal: 20
  - 1999, 2000, 2001, 2002, 2003, 2004, 2005, 2006, 2007, 2008, 2009, 2010, 2011, 2012, 2013, 2014, 2015, 2016, 2017, 2018
- Taça Federação de Andebol de Portugal
  - Winners (1): 2022–23

== European record ==
Season	Competition	Round	Club	1st leg	2nd leg	Aggregate
2016–17	EHF Cup	R1	(France) Brest Bretagne Handball	16–30	18–31	34–61
