= António Teixeira =

António Teixeira may refer to:

- António Teixeira (composer) (1707–after 1769), Portuguese composer
- António Teixeira (1930s footballer), Portuguese footballer
- António Teixeira Lopes (1866–1942), Portuguese sculptor
- António Teixeira de Sousa (1857–1917), Portuguese medical doctor and politician
- António Teixeira (footballer, born 1930), former Portuguese footballer
- António Teixeira (futsal player) (born 1975), Portuguese futsal player
