= A.M. Madeira Andebol SAD =

Portuguese men's handball club

- Full name: Académico Marítimo Madeira Andebol SAD
- Short name: Madeira SAD
- Founded: September 29, 1998
- Dissolved: Merged with C.S. Marítimo in 2022
- Arena: Pavilhão do Marítimo; Funchal, Madeira
- Capacity: 1,000
- League: Andebol 1
- Club colours
Home	Away

Académico Marítimo Madeira Andebol SAD, commonly known as Madeira SAD or A.M. Madeira Andebol SAD, was a Portuguese men's handball team based in Funchal, Madeira. Established on 29 September 1998 by Académico do Funchal and C.S. Marítimo, the team competed in the highest division of Portuguese handball, winning the national championship in 2004–05 and the Portuguese Handball Cup in 1998–99.

Madeira SAD participated regularly in European competitions; its greatest European achievement was reaching the final of the 2018–19 EHF Challenge Cup, losing to Romanian club CSM București.

In 2022, the joint sporting organisation was reorganised, with Marítimo assuming control of the First Division team. The existing company adopted the name Marítimo da Madeira Andebol SAD and continued competing in Andebol 1 under Marítimo's identity. Académico returned to independent senior competition, taking over the Second Division position previously occupied by Marítimo's own handball team.

== History ==
=== Foundation (1998) ===
Handball developed as an organised sport in Madeira during the 1970s, with men's teams participating in national championships by 1985. During the following decade, the island's clubs established themselves in the Portuguese national league system. C.S. Marítimo had reached the First Division in 1994–95, whilst Académico do Funchal won the Second Division championship in 1995–96, securing promotion to the top flight. The two clubs subsequently competed independently in the Portuguese First Division, becoming established representatives of Madeiran men's handball.

In the 1997–98 season, Marítimo was challenging for a place among the championship's top four teams, which would compete for the national title and European qualification. Académico, despite operating with a more limited squad, had secured its First Division status. The clubs met in March 1998 while negotiations were already underway to establish a joint sporting company. The proposed partnership sought to consolidate the clubs' senior men's handball resources within a single professional organisation, providing an opportunity to develop a more competitive Madeiran team, capable of challenging the leading mainland clubs and securing regular participation in European competitions. The arrangement also addressed the financial pressures associated with maintaining senior teams at the highest national level.

The proposal required approval from both founding clubs. At a general meeting held on 14 April 1998, Marítimo's members approved participation in the sporting company by 169 votes to 20, with one abstention, following an earlier meeting marked by disagreement over the project.

Académico Marítimo Madeira Andebol SAD was formally established on 29 September 1998 as a joint sporting company between Académico do Funchal and C.S. Marítimo. Under its articles of association, the company succeeded Académico in its registration and competition rights with the Portuguese Handball Federation, thereby inheriting Académico's First Division position rather than Marítimo's. Both founding clubs continued to exist independently and maintained their own handball activities. The new organisation was distinct from the women's Madeira Andebol SAD, which was also established in 1998 through a separate partnership involving Académico do Funchal, Club Sports da Madeira and Clube Desportivo Infante Dom Henrique. Although the two new teams shared a name and a founding shareholder, their senior teams, competition histories and legal identities were distinct.

The new men's team achieved immediate success, winning the Portuguese Handball Cup in its inaugural 1998–99 season. Coached by José Duarte Espírito Santo, Madeira SAD defeated ABC Braga 20–19 in the semi-finals before beating Boavista 22–14 in the final. The victory marked the first Portuguese Cup triumph by a Madeiran men's handball team and secured the new team's position among Portugal's leading clubs.

=== Early European participation and national championship (1999–2008) ===
A.M. Madeira Andebol SAD made its European debut in the 1999–2000 EHF Cup Winners' Cup, defeating Finnish club Dennis Turku 60–46 on aggregate before losing 52–47 to Spanish side CB Cantabria in the round of 16. The team continued competing at the highest level of Portuguese handball and won the Liga Portuguesa de Andebol in 2004–05 under coach Aleksander Donner. The championship was contested during a period of division between the professional Liga Portuguesa de Andebol and the Portuguese Handball Federation, which organised a separate top-level competition. Madeira SAD won the professional league title, while Sporting CP won the federation's Divisão de Elite championship that season.

Madeira SAD returned to European competition in the 2005–06 EHF Cup, eliminating Italian side Pallamano Trieste 53–49 on aggregate and Slovenian club RK Jeruzalem Ormož 54–53 before losing 69–64 to Danish side GOG Svendborg in the round of 16. Further EHF Cup campaigns followed in 2006–07 and 2007–08. Madeira SAD reached the third round in both seasons, eliminating Turkish club Milli Piyango SK in 2006–07 before losing to Dunaferr of Hungary, and defeating Luxembourg's HB Dudelange in 2007–08 before being eliminated by Polish side Vive Kielce.

The team also won the Taça Presidente da República in 2006–07, adding another national trophy to its honours.

=== Domestic campaigns and European competition (2008–2016) ===
The Madeiran team continued competing in the highest division of Portuguese handball following the reunification of the domestic championship structure. The team finished second in the new top-level Andebol 1 league in three consecutive seasons from 2009–10 to 2011–12 and reached the final of the Portuguese Cup in 2010–11, losing to FC Porto.

Madeira SAD also participated in three consecutive editions of the EHF Cup between 2010–11 and 2012–13. It was eliminated by Austrian club A1 Bregenz in the third round in 2010–11. In 2011–12, the team defeated Faroese side Hondbóltsfelagið Neistin 65–37 on aggregate before losing 51–43 to Slovak club Tatran Prešov in the third round. Its 2012–13 campaign ended in the second round following a 62–51 aggregate defeat against Greek side Diomidis Argous.

Domestically, Madeira SAD finished third in Andebol 1 in 2012–13 and remained among the leading teams in subsequent seasons, reaching the semi-finals of the Portuguese Cup in 2015–16.

In the 2017–18 EHF Challenge Cup, Madeira SAD reached the semi-finals for the first time. The team eliminated Parnassos Strovolou of Cyprus 81–32 on aggregate, MŠK Považská Bystrica of Slovakia 53–49 and Russian club Dynamo-Victor 55–48. In the semi-finals, Madeira SAD lost 29–21 at home to AEK Athens before drawing 23–23 in Greece, exiting the competition 52–44 on aggregate.

=== EHF Challenge Cup final (2018–19) ===
Madeira SAD reached the final of the 2018–19 EHF Challenge Cup, the most successful European campaign in the team's history. The club entered the competition in the third round, defeating Dutch side JD Techniek Hurry-Up 69–49 on aggregate. It subsequently eliminated Ukrainian club Donbas Donetsk 60–47 in the round of 16 and Finnish side Dicken 54–53 in the quarter-finals.

In the semi-finals, Madeira SAD faced AEK Athens for the second consecutive season. The Madeiran side won 27–22 at home and 30–22 away, progressing to the final with a 57–44 aggregate victory.

The final was contested against Romanian club CSM București. The first leg, played at Pavilhão do Marítimo in Funchal on 12 May 2019, ended in a 22–22 draw. Madeira SAD lost the return leg in Bucharest 26–20 on 18 May, finishing runners-up following a 48–42 aggregate defeat.

Domestically, Madeira SAD finished sixth in Andebol 1 and reached the semi-finals of the Portuguese Cup during the same season.

=== Final seasons (2019–2022) ===
Madeira SAD returned to the EHF Challenge Cup in 2019–20, defeating Slovenian side RK Maribor Branik 54–43 on aggregate in the third round. Both legs were played in Madeira, despite Maribor being designated the home team for the second match. In the round of 16, Madeira SAD defeated Czech club HCB Karviná 30–27 at home but lost 33–27 away, exiting the competition 60–57 on aggregate.

The team finished eighth in Andebol 1 in 2019–20 and sixth in 2020–21. In 2021–22, Madeira SAD competed under coach Paulo Fidalgo and finished ninth in the league. The team also reached the final four of the Portuguese Cup. Its final league match under the A.Madeira SAD identity was a 34–30 home defeat against FC Porto on 4 June 2022.

=== Restructuring and change of identity (2022) ===
By the early 2020s, Madeira SAD had experienced declining competitiveness and reduced investment in its playing squad. Financial contributions had become increasingly unbalanced between its founding partners, with Marítimo providing substantially greater funding than Académico do Funchal. The growing investment in Portuguese handball by Porto, Benfica and Sporting also increased the resources required to compete at the highest level.

Plans to restructure A.M. Madeira Andebol SAD were developed during the 2021–22 season, bringing an end to the joint senior sporting project established by Académico do Funchal and Marítimo in 1998. In June 2022, the organisation adopted Marítimo's identity and was renamed Marítimo da Madeira Andebol SAD. The First Division team continued under the new name, retaining Paulo Fidalgo as head coach and much of its playing squad.

The reorganisation aimed to integrate the team more closely into Marítimo's sporting infrastructure and attract greater financial and supporter backing. The team moved its home matches to the Pavilhão do Marítimo. Académico returned to independent senior men's competition, taking over the Second Division position previously occupied by Marítimo's own handball team.

The restructuring preserved the existing sporting company, which retained corporate registration number 511 131 950. Marítimo subsequently increased its shareholding to 99%, while Académico retained 1%.

The 1998–2022 joint sporting identity was discontinued, but the company and its First Division participation continued under Marítimo's name. The restructured team began the 2022–23 Andebol 1 season on 17 September 2022 with a 22–22 home draw against Belenenses.

For the team's subsequent history, see C.S. Marítimo (handball).

== Honours ==
=== Domestic ===
- Portuguese championship
  - Winners (1): 2004–05
- Portuguese Cup
  - Winners (1): 1998–99
  - Runners-up (1): 2010–11
- Taça Presidente da República
  - Winners (1): 2006–07

=== European ===
- EHF Challenge Cup
  - Runners-up (1): 2018–19
  - Semi-finalists (1): 2017–18

== European record ==
Madeira SAD competed in European competitions on eleven occasions between 1999 and 2020.

Season	Competition	Furthest stage
1999–2000	EHF Cup Winners' Cup	—
2005–06	EHF Cup	—
2006–07	EHF Cup	—
2007–08	EHF Cup	—
2010–11	EHF Cup	Third round
2011–12	EHF Cup	Third round
2012–13	EHF Cup	Second qualifying round
2017–18	EHF Challenge Cup	Semi-finals
2018–19	EHF Challenge Cup	Runners-up
2019–20	EHF Challenge Cup	Round of 16

== See also ==
- C.S. Marítimo (handball)
- Académico do Funchal
- Madeira Andebol SAD
