= Rodrigo Andrade =

Rodrigo Andrade may refer to:

- Rodrigo Andrade (footballer, born 1988), Brazilian football attacking midfielder
- Rodrigo Andrade (footballer, born 1997), Brazilian football midfielder
- Rodrigo Andrade (footballer, born 2001), Portuguese football midfielder
