= 1ª Divisão de Andebol Feminino =

Women's handball league in Portugal

Andebol 1 Feminino
- Sport: Handball
- Founded: 1978
- No. of teams: 12
- Country: Portugal
- Confederation: EHF
- Most recent champion: Benfica (11th title)
- Most titles: Madeira SAD (15 titles)
- Broadcaster: Sport TV
- Level on pyramid: 1
- Domestic cups: Portuguese Handball Women's Cup; Portuguese Handball Women's SuperCup
- International cups: Women's EHF Champions League; Women's EHF European League; Women's EHF European Cup
- Website: Federação Andebol
- 2022-23 Andebol 1 Feminino

The 1ª Divisão de Andebol Feminino, Andebol 1 Feminino or Campeonato Nacional Seniores Femininos, 1ª Divisão, is the premier women's handball league in Portugal. It was established in 1978, and it is currently contested by twelve teams. Madeira SAD is the championship's most decorated team.

== List of champions ==
=== Women's Portuguese First Division ===
- 1977–78 | Oeiras | 1
- 1978–79 | Oeiras | 2
- 1979–80 | Maria Amália | 1
- 1980–81 | Torres Novas | 1
- 1981–82 | Almada | 1
- 1982–83 | Oeiras | 3
- 1983–84 | Benfica | 1
- 1984–85 | Ginásio Clube do Sul | 1
- 1985–86 | Benfica | 2
- 1986–87 | Benfica | 3
- 1987–88 | Ginásio Clube do Sul | 2
- 1988–89 | Benfica | 4
- 1989–90 | Benfica | 5
- 1990–91 | Colégio de Gaia | 1
- 1991–92 | Benfica | 6
- 1992–93 | Benfica | 7
- 1993–94 | CS Madeira | 1
- 1994–95 | CS Madeira | 2
- 1995–96 | CS Madeira | 3
- 1996–97 | CS Madeira | 4
- 1997–98 | Académico do Funchal | 1
- 1998–99 | Madeira SAD | 1
- 1999–20 | Madeira SAD | 2
- 2000–01 | Madeira SAD | 3
- 2001–02 | Madeira SAD | 4
- 2002–03 | Madeira SAD | 5
- 2003–04 | Madeira SAD | 6
- 2004–05 | Madeira SAD | 7
- 2005–06 | Madeira SAD | 8
- 2006–07 | Madeira SAD | 9
- 2007–08 | Madeira SAD | 10
- 2008–09 | Madeira SAD | 11

=== Andebol 1 Feminino ===
Year	Champion	TN	Second Place	Third Place	Fourth Place	References
2009–10	Gil Eanes	1	Madeira SAD	Colégio de João Barros	Colégio de Gaia	
2010–11	Gil Eanes	2	Madeira SAD	Colégio de João Barros	Juventude de Lis	
2011–12	Madeira SAD	12	Gil Eanes	Colégio de João Barros	Maritímo	
2012–13	Alavarium	1	Madeira SAD	Colégio de João Barros	Juventude de Lis	
2013–14	Alavarium	2	Madeira SAD	Colégio de João Barros	Colégio de Gaia	
2014–15	Alavarium	3	Madeira SAD	Colégio de Gaia	Colégio de João Barros	
2015–16	Madeira SAD	13	Alavarium	Colégio de Gaia	Colégio de João Barros	
2016–17	Colégio de Gaia	2	Madeira SAD	Alavarium	Colégio de João Barros	
2017–18	Madeira SAD	14	Colégio de Gaia	Alavarium	Maiastars	
2018–19	Colégio de Gaia	3	Madeira SAD	Alavarium	1º Maio	
2019–20	Colégio de Gaia	(Note: The season was not completed due to the COVID-19 pandemic in Portugal.)	Madeira SAD	Alavarium	Benfica	
2020–21	Madeira SAD	15	Benfica	Alavarium	Alpendorada	
2021–22	Benfica	8	Madeira SAD	Alavarium	Académica de Coimbra	
2022–23	Benfica	9	Madeira SAD	AD Academia Andebol SPS	Sur 1º Maio / ADA CJB	
2023–24	Benfica	10	Madeira SAD	Colegio de Gaia	AD Academia Andebol SPS	

== Performances ==
Club	Titles	Years won
Madeira SAD	15	1998–99, 1999–00, 2000–01, 2001–02, 2002–03, 2003–04, 2004–05, 2005–06, 2006–07, 2007–08, 2008–09, 2011–12, 2015–16, 2017–18, 2020–21
Benfica	11	1983–84, 1985–86, 1986–87, 1988–89, 1989–90, 1991–92, 1992–93, 2021–22, 2022–23, 2023-24, 2024-25
CS Madeira	4	1993–94, 1994–95, 1995–96, 1996–97
Colégio de Gaia	3	1990–91, 2016–17, 2018–19
Alavarium	3	2012–13, 2013–14, 2014–15
Gil Eanes	2	2009–10, 2010–11
Ginásio Clube do Sul	2	1984–85, 1987–88
GDL Oeiras	2	1977–78, 1978–79
AD Oeiras	1	1982–83
Académico do Funchal	1	1997–98
Almada AC	1	1981–82
Torres Novas	1	1980–81
Maria Amália	1	1979–80

== See also ==
Men's

- Andebol 1
- Second Division
- Third Division
- Taça de Portugal
- Supertaça
- Youth Honors

Women's

- Taça de Portugal
- Supertaça
- Youth Honors (Women)
