= C.S. Marítimo (youth) =

C.S. Marítimo Juniors
- Full name: Club Sport Marítimo Juniors
- Nicknames: Os Verde-Rubros (The Green-and-Red); Os Leões (The Lions)
- Founded: 1910
- Ground: Campo do Andorinha; Funchal, Madeira
- Capacity: 1,000
- Chairman: (Portugal) Carlos Pereira
- Manager: (Portugal) Daniel Quintal
- League: 1st Division South
- 2007-08: 1st Div. South, 7th
Home colours	Away colours

Club Sport Marítimo "Juniors" (Juniores in Portuguese) is the youth team department of the Portuguese football club C.S. Marítimo. They play their home games at the Campo do Andorinha in the suburb of Santo António in Funchal, Madeira.

There are main development teams in the Under-19's category (Juniores "A"), Under-17's (Juvenis "B"), Under-15's (Iniciados "C") and Under-13's (Infantis "D"), with further teams in the Under-12's, Under-11's and Under-9's age groups completing the club's youth academy.

== Notable former players ==
- (Portugal) Briguel
- (Portugal) Bruno
- (Portugal) Danny
- (Portugal) Paulinho
- (Portugal) Pinga
- (Portugal) Tito
- (Brazil) Ytalo
