= Tito Silva =

Portuguese footballer

Personal information
- Full name: Tito Emanuel Andrade Silva
- Date of birth: 10 May 1986 (age 40)
- Place of birth: Funchal, Portugal
- Height: 1.84 m (6 ft 0 in)
- Position: Midfielder

Team information
- Current team: Ribeira Brava

Youth career
- 2004–2005: Marítimo

Senior career*
| Years | Team | Apps | (Gls) |
| 2004–2013 | Marítimo B | 7 | (0) |
| 2008 | Marítimo | 3 | (0) |
| 2010–2011 | → Varzim (loan) | 16 | (0) |
| 2014–2018 | Camacha | 95 | (7) |
| 2018–2019 | Andorinha | 14 | (0) |
| 2019– | Ribeira Brava | 9 | (1) |
- * Club domestic league appearances and goals as of 18:40, 23 August 2020 (UTC)

Tito Emanuel Andrade Silva (born 10 May 1986) is a Portuguese footballer who plays as a midfielder for CD Ribeira Brava.

== Career ==
Silva made his professional debut in the Primeira Liga for Marítimo on 11 January 2008, when he came on as a half-time substitute for Wênio in a 3–1 loss to Paços de Ferreira.
