= Ibrahim Alani =

Nigerian footballer (born 2006)

Personal information
- Full name: Ibrahim Akitunde Alani
- Date of birth: 29 July 2006 (age 20)
- Place of birth: Lagos, Nigeria
- Height: 1.75 m (5 ft 9 in)
- Position: Midfielder

Team information
- Current team: Marítimo

Youth career
- Abia Comets
- 2024–2025: Valladolid

Senior career*
Years	Team	Apps	(Gls)
2025	Valladolid B	15	(0)
2025–2026	Valladolid	18	(0)
2026–	Marítimo	0	(0)
- * Club domestic league appearances and goals as of 31 May 2026

Ibrahim Akitunde Alani (born 29 July 2006) is a Nigerian footballer who plays as a midfielder for Portuguese club Marítimo.

== Club career ==
Born in Lagos, Alani played for the youth sides of local Abia Comets FC before being spotted by Valladolid in 2023, when playing in a football programme called 'The Showcase' in Cairo. He had to wait until his 18th birthday to sign for the club, and only made his debut with the Juvenil squad in October 2024, after having issues completing the transfer.

Alani made his senior debut with the reserves on 19 January 2025, coming on as a second-half substitute in a 0–0 Segunda Federación away draw against Deportivo Fabril. After quickly establishing himself as a starter for the side, he renewed his contract until 2027 on 1 April.

Alani made his first team – and La Liga – debut on 13 May 2025, replacing Florian Grillitsch in a 1–0 home loss to Girona, as the club was already relegated. Ahead of the 2025–26 season, he was definitely promoted to the main squad, being handed the number 12 jersey.

On 12 August 2026, Alani signed a three-year contract with Primeira Liga side Marítimo.

== International career ==
On 30 March 2025, Alani was called up to the Nigeria national under-20 team for the 2025 U-20 Africa Cup of Nations, but had to withdraw from the squad after having symptoms of dehydration.
