= Eshele Botende =

Congolese footballer (born 1970)

Personal information
- Full name: Eshele Bote Botende
- Date of birth: 20 May 1970 (age 56)
- Place of birth: Kinshasa, Zaire
- Position: Goalkeeper

Senior career*
Years	Team	Apps	(Gls)
1994–1996	Kaizer Chiefs		
1996–1997	Maritimo	2	(0)

International career
1991–1997	Zaire	2	
- * Club domestic league appearances and goals

Eshele Botende (born May 22, 1970 in Kinshasa, Democratic Republic of the Congo) is a retired Congolese football goalkeeper. He played for Kaizer Chiefs, Maritimo and for a brief period in West Ham.
