= Colégio de Gaia =

Portuguese handball club

Colégio de Gaia (Portugal)
- Full name: Colégio de Gaia
- Founded: 1933; 92 years ago
- League: 1ª Divisão
- 2015-2016: 3rd

Colégio de Gaia/Toyota is a women's handball club from Vila Nova de Gaia in Portugal. Colégio de Gaia competes in the 1ª Divisão.

== Titles ==
- Portuguese League
  - Winner: (3) 1991, 2017, 2019
  - Second place: 2018,
  - Third place: 2015, 2016
- Portuguese Cup
  - Winner: (4) 1990, 1998, 2017, 2019
- Portuguese Super Cup
  - Winner: (4) 1991, 1998, 2017, 2019

== European record ==
Season	Competition	Round	Club	1st leg	2nd leg	Aggregate
2016-17	Challenge Cup	R3	(Spain) Helvetia BM Alcobendas	21–25	29–19	50–44
2016-17	Challenge Cup	1/8	(Spain) Mecalia Atletico Guardes	26–30	22–32	48–62

== Team ==
=== Current squad ===
Squad for the 2016–17 season

Goalkeepers

- (Portugal) Bruna Cerqueira
- (Portugal) Ana Catarina Ferreira
- (Portugal) Jessica Ferreira
- (Portugal) Daniela Pereira
- (Portugal) Maria Rocha

Wingers
RW

- (Portugal) Sofia Jesus
- (Portugal) Catarina Mendes
- (Portugal) Bebiana Rodrigues Sabino

LW

- (Angola) Slavia Joao
- (Portugal) Carolina Monteiro
- (Portugal) Helena Soares

Back players
LB

- (Portugal) Melissa Costa
- (Portugal) Carolina Loureiro
- (Portugal) Joana Pinto
- (Portugal) Patricia Resende
- (Portugal) Sandra Santiago

CB

- (Portugal) Patricia da Silva Lima
- (Portugal) Maria Duarte

RB

- (Portugal) Sara Costa
- (Portugal) Ana Gante
- (Portugal) Rosa Nolasco
- (Portugal) Nair Pinho
- (Portugal) Catarina Ruela
- (Portugal) Vanessa Silva
