= José Melro =

Portuguese footballer

Personal information
- Full name: José Miguel Reis Melro
- Date of birth: 26 May 2004 (age 22)
- Place of birth: Santarém, Portugal
- Height: 1.77 m (5 ft 10 in)
- Position: Left winger

Team information
- Current team: Marítimo
- Number: 9

Youth career
- 2010–2012: Footkart
- 2012–2016: Académica Santarém
- 2016–2017: Footkart
- 2017–2020: Académica Santarém
- 2020–2022: União de Santarém
- 2022–2024: Benfica

Senior career*
Years	Team	Apps	(Gls)
2021–2022	União de Santarém	6	(3)
2021	→ União de Santarém B	5	(2)
2024–2026	Benfica B	39	(7)
2026–	Marítimo	4	(0)

International career^{‡}
2022	Portugal U18	3	(1)
2022	Portugal U19	1	(0)
2023–	Portugal U20	4	(0)
- * Club domestic league appearances and goals as of 19 June 2026 ‡ National team caps and goals as of 23 November 2024

José Miguel Reis Melro (born 26 May 2004) is a Portuguese professional footballer who plays as a left winger for Marítimo.

== Club career ==
Melro is a youth product of Footkart, Académica Santarém and União de Santarém, before moving to Benfica's youth academy in 2022. During the 2021–22 season he played for the youth team, B team and senior team of União de Santarém, scoring a remarkable 40 goals in 28 matches. On 17 July 2024 he renewed his contract with Benfica. José Melro, who attracted interest from some clubs, including Barcelona, would remain at the club and signed a contract until 2027. The contract had a clause of 60 million euros and he was integrated into the B team.

On 2 February 2026, Melro joined C.S. Marítimo.

== International career ==
Melro is a youth international for Portugal. He has played up to the Portugal U20s.
