= Pavilhão do Marítimo =

- Location: Santo António, Funchal, Madeira
- Owner: C.S. Marítimo
- Operator: C.S. Marítimo
- Capacity: 750 (original seating); expanded to 1,000 (major events)

Construction
- Opened: 18 April 2006
- Architect: Pedro Araújo

Tenant
- C.S. Marítimo (handball)

The Pavilhão do Marítimo is an indoor sports arena in Santo António, Funchal, on the Portuguese island of Madeira. Opened in 2006, the facility is part of Club Sport Marítimo's Complexo Desportivo and is used for handball, futsal and other indoor sports.

The venue has hosted the 2018–19 EHF Challenge Cup Final, the 2023 men's Portuguese Cup Final Four and matches in the 2026–27 EHF European League.

== History ==
Designed by architect Pedro Araújo, the arena was built as part of the development of Marítimo's sports complex in Santo António. Plans for the project were reported in December 2000, with original proposals for the building to be situated alongside the club's existing football stadium, Estádio dos Barreiros, before relocating to the Santo António location.

The pavilion was inaugurated on 18 April 2006, at a ceremony attended by Alberto João Jardim, then president of the Regional Government of Madeira. The first match held at the new venue was a Madeira Cup futsal fixture between Marítimo and 1.º de Maio. The building also houses the Colégio do Marítimo, providing pre-primary and primary education, together with a gymnasium, physiotherapy facilities, administrative offices, a restaurant and underground parking.

On 12 May 2019, the pavilion hosted the first leg of the men's 2018–19 EHF Challenge Cup Final between local team Madeira Andebol SAD and Romanian side CSM București. Additional spectator seating was added to bring the capacity up from 750 to 1,000 seats.

In September 2022, a new synthetic playing surface was installed at the arena, ahead of the start of the Portuguese handball season as well as improvements to the lighting system. At the end of the season the venue was used for the 2023 Portuguese Handball Cup Final Four event, which Marítimo faced Sporting, with reports putting attendance figures at around 1,500 spectators. Sporting went on to win the final 30–29 against the home side, securing their second consecutive Portuguese Cup.

== See also ==
- C.S. Marítimo
- C.S. Marítimo (handball)
