= Juca (footballer, born 1955) =

Portuguese football player and manager

Rui Emanuel Gonçalves Rodrigues (20 January 1955 – 18 June 2024), known as Juca, was a Portuguese football player and manager. He held several roles at Marítimo, including as first-team head coach in 2005.

== Career ==
Juca played football for Madeiran clubs C.S. Marítimo, C.F. União, C.D. Nacional and Académico Funchal, as well as being a handball player and coach. He led Liceu to runners-up in the 1974 Portuguese women's handball championship.

Juca managed clubs on the island including ACD São Vicente and A.D. Camacha, but spent most of his career at Marítimo in roles including technical coordinator, assistant manager and academy manager, in addition to being a physical education teacher. At the start of April 2005, he succeeded Mariano Barreto as first-team head coach. His debut on 3 April was a 4–3 Primeira Liga loss away to eventual champions S.L. Benfica. On 19 September 2005, after taking two points from the first four games of the new season, he was dismissed.
