= C.S. Marítimo (futsal) =

- Full name: Club Sport Marítimo
- Nickname: -
- Founded: -
- Ground: Pavilhão do Marítimo; Funchal, Madeira; Portugal
- Capacity: 1,000
- League: 3rd Division, Série D
Home colours	Away colours

Club Sport Marítimo is an amateur Portuguese futsal team based in Funchal, Madeira, and is part of the C.S. Marítimo sports club.

After winning the Madeira regional leagues, the team was promoted to the national leagues for the 2008-09 season, and are currently competing in Division 3. The team plays all of its home games at the Pavilhão do Marítimo arena.

== Honours ==
- Madeira Regional Championship: Winners 2007/08
- Madeira Cup: Winners 2005/06

== Current Squad 2008/09 ==
#		Name	Date of birth	Last club
1	(Portugal)	José Ferreira (GK)	18/02/1977
12	(Portugal)	Carlos Monteiro (GK)	26/07/1973
2	(Portugal)	Nuno Silva	22-09-1977	Câmara de Lobos
3	(Portugal)	Francisco	04-12-1984
4	(Brazil)	Silas	25-08-1974	1º Maio
5	(Portugal)	Lino	23-09-1977	Pontassolense
6	(Portugal)	Bruno Salgado	22-07-1980
7	(Portugal)	Hugo	19-07-1979
8	(Brazil)	João Nunes	08-08-1974
9	(Portugal)	Renato	21-02-1976
10	(Portugal)	Alexandre	18-08-1985	Nacional
11	(Portugal)	Marco Fonseca	19/05/1980	Amigos de Futsal
13	(Portugal)	Vítor Santos	29-10-1987
14	(Portugal)	Hélder	24-07-1989	Santanense
16	(Portugal)	Daniel	22-09-1980	Santanense
17	(Portugal)	Ricardo Sousa	22-03-1977	Santanense

== See also ==
- C.S. Marítimo
