= Amâncio Canhembe =

Mozambican footballer

Personal information
- Full name: Amâncio João Pita Canhembe
- Date of birth: 16 November 1997 (age 28)
- Place of birth: Maputo, Mozambique
- Height: 1.80 m (5 ft 11 in)
- Position: Midfielder

Team information
- Current team: Marítimo B

Youth career
- 2016: Sporting
- 2018–2020: Vitória de Setúbal

Senior career*
Years	Team	Apps	(Gls)
- Liga Desportiva
2016–2017	Sertanense	29	(1)
2020–	Marítimo B	17	(2)

International career
2018–	Mozambique	4	(1)
- * Club domestic league appearances and goals

Amâncio João Pita Canhembe (born 16 November 1997) is a Mozambican footballer who plays as a midfielder for Marítimo B.

== Career ==
Canhembe started his career with Mozambican side Liga Desportiva, where he was nicknamed "Neymar" after the Brazilian international.

Before the second half of 2015–16, Canhembe joined the youth academy of Sporting in the Portuguese top flight. In 2016, he signed for Portuguese third division club Sertanense.
