= António Teixeira (1930s footballer) =

Portuguese footballer

Personal information
- Date of birth: Unknown
- Place of birth: Portugal
- Date of death: Deceased
- Position: Defender

Senior career*
Years	Team	Apps	(Gls)
- Marítimo

International career
1931	Portugal	1	(0)
- * Club domestic league appearances and goals

António Teixeira was a Portuguese footballer who played as a defender.

== Football career ==
Teixeira gained 1 cap for Portugal when he played against Italy on 12 April 1931 in Porto, in a 0-2 defeat.
