= Ewerton (footballer, born 1957) =

Brazilian footballer (born 19657)

Personal information
- Full name: Ewerton Machado Jaenisch
- Date of birth: December 26, 1957 (age 68)
- Place of birth: Brazil
- Position: Goalkeeper

Senior career*
Years	Team	Apps	(Gls)
1977–1978	Estrela FC		
1979–1986	Portuguesa	59	(0)
1986–1996	Marítimo	268	(0)
- * Club domestic league appearances and goals

Ewerton Machado Jaenisch (born 26 December 1957) is a Brazilian former footballer.

== Early life ==
Ewerton has one kidney and does not have a spleen, having lost both organs following a rough collision with an opposing player during a match in 1984.

== Career ==
Ewerton started his career with Brazilian side Estrela FC. In 1979, he signed for Brazilian side Portuguesa. In 1986, he signed for Portuguese side Marítimo. He was regarded as one of the club's most important players.

== Personal life ==
After retiring from professional football, he lived in Lajeado, Brazil. He has owned an industrial automation equipment company.
