= Rodrigo Andrade (footballer, born 2001) =

Portuguese footballer

Personal information
- Full name: Rodrigo Marcos Rodrigues Andrade
- Date of birth: 24 November 2001 (age 24)
- Place of birth: Funchal, Portugal
- Height: 1.80 m (5 ft 11 in)
- Position: Midfielder

Team information
- Current team: Marítimo
- Number: 6

Youth career
- 2010–2011: Andorinha
- 2011–2012: Formação Madeira
- 2012–2014: Nacional
- 2015–2020: Marítimo

Senior career*
Years	Team	Apps	(Gls)
2020–2024	Marítimo B	69	(0)
2021–	Marítimo	28	(0)
- * Club domestic league appearances and goals as of 19:58, 10 October 2026 (UTC)

Rodrigo Marcos Rodrigues Andrade (born 24 November 2001) is a Portuguese professional footballer who plays as a midfielder for Primeira Liga club Marítimo.

== Club career ==
Born in Funchal, Madeira, Andrade joined C.S. Marítimo's youth system at the age of 13. In August 2020 he signed his first professional contract with the club, going on to spend his first seasons as a senior with the reserves in the third division as well as the under-23 side.

Andrade made his Primeira Liga debut for the first team on 16 August 2021, coming on as a late substitute in a 2–1 away win against B-SAD.

== Honours ==
Marítimo

- Liga Portugal 2: 2025–26
