= Portuguese Women's Handball Super Cup =

- Founded: 1982
- Country: Portugal
- Confederation: EHF
- Number of clubs: 2
- Current champions: Benfica (4th title)
- Most championships: Madeira SAD (20 titles)
- Broadcasters: FAP TV, RTP2, A Bola TV
- Website: Federação Andebol

The Portuguese Women's Handball Super Cup (Portuguese: Supertaça de Portugal de Andebol Feminino) is a Portuguese professional women's handball competition, played between the winners of the 1ª Divisão de Andebol Feminino and the winners of the Portuguese Cup (or the finalist, if the same team wins both competitions).

== Winners ==
- 1982 : C. Ourique
- 1983 : Ass. Desp. Oeiras
- 1985–1986 : Not held
- 1987: Ginásio Sul
- 1988–1989 : Not held
- 1990 : Benfica
- 1991 : Colégio de Gaia
- 1992 : Benfica (2)
- 1993 : Club Sports Madeira
- 1994 : União Almeirim
- 1995 : Sports Madeira (2)
- 1996 : Académico do Funchal
- 1997 : Colégio de Gaia (2)
- 1998 : Madeira SAD
- 1999 : Madeira SAD (2)
- 2000 : Madeira SAD (3)
- 2001 : Madeira SAD (4)
- 2002 : Madeira SAD (5)
- 2003 : Madeira SAD (6)
- 2004 : Madeira SAD (7)
- 2005 : Madeira SAD (8)
- 2006 : Madeira SAD (9)
- 2007 : Madeira SAD (10)
- 2008 : Madeira SAD (11)
- 2009 : Madeira SAD (12)
- 2010 : Madeira SAD (13)
- 2011 : Madeira SAD (14)
- 2012 : Madeira SAD (15)
- 2013 : Madeira SAD (16)
- 2014 : Madeira SAD (17)
- 2015 : Madeira SAD (18)
- 2016 : Madeira SAD (19)
- 2017 : Colégio de Gaia (3)
- 2018 : Madeira SAD (20)
- 2019 : Colégio de Gaia (4)
- 2021 : Associação Recreativa e Cultural de Alpendorada (1)
- 2022 : Benfica (3)
- 2023 : Benfica (4)

== Titles by club ==
Team	Won	Years won
Madeira SAD	18	1998, 1999, 2000, 2001, 2002, 2003, 2004, 2005, 2006, 2007, 2008, 2009, 2010, 2011, 2012, 2013, 2014, 2015, 2016, 2017
Benfica	4	1990, 1992, 2022, 2023
Colégio de Gaia	4	1991, 1998, 2017, 2019
Club Sports Madeira	2	1993, 1995
Académico do Funchal	1	1996
C.Ourique	1	1982
Ass. Desp. Oeiras	1	1983
Ginásio Sul	1	1987
União Almeirim	1	1994
Associação Recreativa e Cultural de Alpendorada	1	2021
