= Ginásio Clube do Sul =

Portuguese handball club

Ginásio Clube do Sul (Portugal)
- Full name: Ginásio Clube do Sul
- Short name: GCS
- Club colours

Ginásio Clube do Sul is a handball team based in Almada, Portugal, that plays in Liga Portuguesa de Andebol.

== 2006–07 squad ==
#		Name	Age	Last Club
	(Portugal)	Antonio Ribeiro (GK)	34
	(Portugal)	Pedro Costa (GK)	25
	(Portugal)	Gonçalo Neves	25	Almada AC
	(Portugal)	João Monteiro	31
	(Portugal)	João Palmela	27	Boa Hora
	(Portugal)	Ivan Coelho	20
	(Portugal)	Sergio Santos	32
	(Portugal)	Ricardo Gomes	30
	(Portugal)	Pedro Neto	30	AC Leiria
	(Portugal)	Ivan Dias	22
	(Portugal)	Luis Blanco	20
	(Portugal)	Omar Abel	23
	(Portugal)	Nuno Salgueiro	19
	(Portugal)	Ruben Pacheco	18	Ginásio Clube do Sul (Juniores)
	(Portugal)	Tiago Santos	32	São Bernardo
