= C.S. Marítimo (handball) =

Portuguese handball club

- Full name: Club Sport Marítimo
- Founded: 1973
- Arena: Pavilhão do Marítimo, Funchal, Portugal
- Capacity: 1,000
- Head coach: (Ukraine) Victor Petrovitch Tchikoulaev
- League: Andebol 1
| Home | Away |

Club Sport Marítimo is a handball team based in Funchal, Portugal, and is part of the C.S. Marítimo sports club. They currently compete in the top-tier Liga Portuguesa de Andebol, after stepping up from the Divisão de Elite in 2009. Before being accepted into the premier division, Marítimo was a dominant force in the Divisão de Elite, having been crowned Champions for the 2006-07 and 2007-08 season's.

== History ==
=== Foundation and early years ===
Handball was introduced at C.S. Marítimo in the early 1970s, following the development of the sport in schools across Madeira. The club participated in the island's inaugural district junior championship in 1972, alongside C.D. Nacional and Ateneu Comercial do Funchal. Marítimo won its first handball competition in 1973, claiming the Torneio Motivação with a squad largely recruited from the Escola Industrial e Comercial do Funchal, coached by Norberto Correia and José Maria Melim. In December 1974, the club won a triangular tournament, defeating Belenenses 20–18 and Nacional 17–16.

The handball section expanded during the 1970s, with the club entering teams in several youth categories. The senior men's team won consecutive Madeira championships in 1977–78 and 1978–79, whilst the junior side also claimed the regional title in 1977–78. Marítimo continued to compete in regional men's and women's competitions throughout the 1980s. By 1987, the handball section had approximately 180 registered players. In 1988–89, the men's senior team entered the national Third Division, finishing fifth with a squad composed entirely of Madeiran players.

=== Rise to the First Division ===
Marítimo progressed through the national divisions during the early 1990s, gaining promotion to the First Division at the end of the 1993–94 season. The club made its debut in the highest division of Portuguese men's handball in 1994–95, under coach João Prudente. The 1994–95 squad consisted of 16 players, including four juniors and one youth player, and had an average age of approximately 20. Only two members of the squad were foreign players. Marítimo occupied sixth place during the first half of the championship before finishing tenth in the second half, retaining its First Division status.

The club also developed several players who represented Portugal at youth international level. Nuno Gomes and Duarte Sousa were selected for the national under-20 team, while Hernâni Gonçalves was called into national youth training camps. Nuno Gomes and Filipe Alves received regional young-player awards for the 1993–94 and 1994–95 seasons respectively.

=== Madeira SAD partnership ===
During the 1990s, Marítimo's participation in the highest division of Portuguese handball brought increasing financial and organisational demands. Despite establishing itself in the top flight, the club faced difficulties sustaining the resources required for professional competition, leading to plans for a jointly operated handball organisation with fellow Madeiran club Académico do Funchal.

By the 1997–98 season, both clubs were competing in the national First Division. Marítimo was challenging for a place among the top four teams and qualification for the championship's final phase, while Académico had secured its First Division status. On 14 April 1998, Marítimo's members approved the creation of a joint handball sporting company following an earlier vote in which the proposal had failed to obtain the required three-quarters majority. The revised proposal was approved by 169 votes to 20, with one abstention. The proposed share capital was 50 million Portuguese escudos, divided between the Regional Government of Madeira (50%), C.S. Marítimo (25%) and Académico do Funchal (25%).

The agreement provided for the new organisation to operate without using the name, colours or emblem of either founding club. Marítimo retained its sporting rights, and the approved proposal provided for the continuation of its own First Division and under-20 teams. The arrangement was intended to establish a more sustainable professional structure while allowing the participating clubs to maintain their individual identities and youth development programmes.

The professional project was established later that year as Académico Marítimo Madeira Andebol SAD, commonly known as Madeira SAD. The new team competed independently in the Portuguese national championship, while Marítimo continued to operate its own handball section.

Madeira SAD achieved early success, winning the Portuguese Cup in 1998–99, followed by the national championship in 2004–05. Marítimo subsequently continued competing under its own name in the national Second Division, alongside its youth teams.

In 2002–03, Marítimo competed in the EHF Challenge Cup, facing Greek side G.A.C. Kilkis in the second round. The team lost 23–30 at home and 24–31 away, exiting the competition 47–61 on aggregate.

=== First Division championship ===
Marítimo won the 2007–08 national First Division championship, competing in the federation-organised competition during the period when Portuguese men's handball had separate national championship structures. The title was won during the Divisão de Elite era and was the club's first national senior men's handball championship.

=== Domestic competition (2008–2022) ===
Marítimo continued to compete in the Portuguese national handball league system following its First Division championship. The team finished fifth in Andebol 1 in 2009–10 and subsequently spent much of the following decade in the Second Division.

The club reached the quarter-finals of the Portuguese Cup in 2009–10, 2011–12, 2012–13, 2016–17 and 2018–19.

During this period, Marítimo maintained its independent senior team alongside its involvement in the Madeira SAD professional project.

=== Integration of Madeira SAD (2022) ===
In 2022, C.S. Marítimo assumed control of the Madeira SAD professional handball project. The existing sporting company, previously named Académico Marítimo Madeira Andebol SAD, was renamed Marítimo da Madeira Andebol SAD and became the club's principal senior men's team.

The restructuring saw Marítimo assume Madeira SAD's position in Andebol 1, whilst Académico do Funchal took over the Second Division place previously held by Marítimo's senior team. Marítimo da Madeira Andebol SAD retained the existing professional organisation's competitive history, while operating under the identity of C.S. Marítimo.

=== European competition (2024–present) ===
Marítimo returned to European competition in the 2024–25 EHF European League, facing Swedish club Ystads IF HF in the qualifying round. The team won the home leg 35–33 but lost 39–31 in Sweden, being eliminated 72–66 on aggregate.

The club also competed in the 2025–26 EHF European League qualifying round, losing both legs to Danish side SAH Aarhus.

Marítimo qualified for the group stage of the 2026–27 EHF European League and was drawn alongside Bidasoa Irun of Spain, Limoges Handball of France and FH Hafnarfjörður of Iceland.

Ahead of the competition, the club considered relocating its European home matches to the Pavilhão Multiusos do Porto Santo due to venue requirements imposed by the European Handball Federation. However, the EHF subsequently approved the Pavilhão do Marítimo in Santo António, allowing the matches to take place at the club's regular home venue.

== Team ==
=== Current squad ===
Squad for the 2026–27 season

Goalkeepers
Left Wingers
Right Wingers
Line players

Left Backs
Central Backs
Right Backs

=== Transfers ===
Transfers for the 2026–27 season

Joining

Leaving

- (Portugal) Gustavo Miers (CB) to (Portugal) Academico do Funchal

== See also ==
- C.S. Marítimo
