= C.S. Madeira =

Portuguese handball club

CS Madeira (Portugal)
- Full name: Club Sports da Madeira
- Founded: November 3, 1909; 116 years ago
- Arena: Pavilhão do Funchal; Funchal, Madeira
- Capacity: 800
- League: 1ª Divisão
- 2015-2016: 6th
- Club colours

Club Sports da Madeira is a women's handball club from Funchal in Portugal. CS Madeira competes in the 1ª Divisão.

== Titles ==
- Portuguese League
  - Winner: (4) 1994, 1995, 1996, 1997
- Portuguese Cup
  - Winner: (3) 1996, 1997, 2016
- Portuguese Super Cup
  - Winner: (2) 1993, 1995

== European record ==
Season	Competition	Round	Club	Home	Away	Aggregate
2016-17	Challenge Cup	R2	(Austria) SSV Dornbirn Schoren	30–20	36–34	66–54
2016-17	Challenge Cup	R3	(Croatia) HC Lokomotiva Zagreb	24–29	21–40	45–69

== Team ==
=== Current squad ===
Squad for the 2016–17 season

Goalkeepers

- (Portugal) Nance Gouveia Fernandes
- (Portugal) Márcia Rodrigues Teixeira
- (Portugal) Maria Saldanha Mendonça
- (Portugal) Nádia Silva Nunes

Wingers
RW

- (Portugal) Catarina Côrte Ascensão
- (Portugal) Odete de Freitas
- (Portugal) Maria Kourdoulos

LW

- (Portugal) Sara Rodrigues Gonçalves
- (Portugal) Bárbara Santos Gomes

Line players

- (Portugal) Sandra Martins Gonçalves
- (Portugal) Catarina Ribeiro Fernandes

Back players
LB

- (Portugal) Maria Abreu Leça
- (Portugal) Ana Silva Cardoso
- (Portugal) Ana Sousa Pestana

CB

- (Portugal) Jéssica Andrade Gouveia
- (Portugal) Mónica Mendonça Gomes
- (Portugal) Leonor Rosário Abreu
- (Portugal) Lisandra Vieira Almeida
- (Portugal) Ana Vieira Franco

RB

- (Portugal) Beatriz Faria Sousa
- (Portugal) Ana Sofia Gouveia Araújo
- (Portugal) Cláudia Vieira
