= Portuguese Women's Handball Cup =

- Founded: 1975
- Country: Portugal
- Confederation: EHF
- Current champions: Benfica (8th title)
- Most championships: Madeira SAD (19 titles)
- Broadcasters: FAP TV, RTP2, Sport TV
- Website: Federação Andebol

The Portuguese Women's Handball Cup (Portuguese: Taça de Portugal de Andebol Feminino) is a Portuguese handball competition, played in the Swiss system and eligible for all women's professional or amateur teams.

== Winners ==
- 1975–76 : CF Belenenses
- 1976–77 : Lic.Maria Amália
- 1977–78 : Lic.Maria Amália (2)
- 1978–79 : Almada AC
- 1979–80 : Lic.Maria Amália (3)
- 1980–81 : CD Torres Novas
- 1981–82 : C.Ourique
- 1982–83 : C.Ourique (2)
- 1983–84 : Ass. Desp. Oeiras
- 1984–85 : Benfica
- 1985–86 : Benfica (2)
- 1986–87 : Benfica (3)
- 1987–88 : Benfica (4)
- 1988–89 : Benfica (5)
- 1989–90 : Colégio de Gaia
- 1990–91 : Paço Arcos
- 1991–92 : Benfica (6)
- 1992–93 : Académico do Funchal
- 1993–94 : Académico do Funchal (2)
- 1994–95 : Académico do Funchal (3)
- 1995–96 : Club Sports Madeira
- 1996–97 : Club Sports Madeira (2)
- 1997–98 : Colégio de Gaia (2)
- 1998–99 : Madeira SAD
- 1999–00 : Madeira SAD (2)
- 2000–01 : Madeira SAD (3)
- 2001–02 : Madeira SAD (4)
- 2002–03 : Madeira SAD (5)
- 2003–04 : Madeira SAD (6)
- 2004–05 : Madeira SAD (7)
- 2005–06 : Madeira SAD (8)
- 2006–07 : Madeira SAD (9)
- 2007–08 : Madeira SAD (10)
- 2008–09 : Madeira SAD (11)
- 2009–10 : Madeira SAD (12)
- 2010–11 : Madeira SAD (13)
- 2011–12 : Madeira SAD (14)
- 2012–13 : Madeira SAD (15)
- 2013–14 : Madeira SAD (16)
- 2014–15 : Madeira SAD (17)
- 2015–16 : Club Sports Madeira (3)
- 2016–17 : Colégio de Gaia (3)
- 2017–18 : Madeira SAD (18)
- 2018–19 : Colégio de Gaia (4)
- 2019–20 : Cancelled
- 2020–21 : Madeira SAD (19)
- 2021–22 : Benfica (7)
- 2022–23 : Benfica (8)
- 2023–24 : Madeira SAD (20)
- 2024–25 : Benfica (9)

== Titles by club ==
Team	Won	Years won
Madeira SAD	20	1999, 2000, 2001, 2002, 2003, 2004, 2005, 2006, 2007, 2008, 2009, 2010, 2011, 2012, 2013, 2014, 2015, 2018, 2021, 2024
Benfica	9	1985, 1986, 1987, 1988, 1989, 1992, 2022, 2023, 2025
Colégio de Gaia	4	1990, 1998, 2017, 2019
Académico do Funchal	3	1993, 1994, 1995
Lic.Maria Amália	3	1977, 1978, 1980
Club Sports Madeira	3	1996, 1997, 2016
C.Ourique	2	1982, 1983
CF Belenenses	1	1976
Almada AC	1	1979
CD Torres Novas	1	1981
Ass. Desp. Oeiras	1	1984
Paço Arcos	1	1991
