= C.S. Marítimo =

Marítimo
- Full name: Club Sport Marítimo
- Nicknames: Maritimistas; O Maior das Ilhas (The Greatest of the Islands); Os Verde-Rubros (The Green-and-Reds); Os Leões do Almirante Reis (The Lions of Almirante Reis)
- Founded: 20 September 1910; 116 years ago
- Ground: Estádio do Marítimo
- Capacity: 10,932
- President: Carlos André Gomes
- Head coach: Mitchell van der Gaag
- League: Primeira Liga
- 2025–26: Liga Portugal 2, 1st of 18 (champions)
- Website: www.csmaritimo.org.pt
Home colours	Away colours	Third colours

Club Sport Marítimo MH M (Portuguese pronunciation: [mɐˈɾitimu]), commonly known as Marítimo or Marítimo da Madeira, is a Portuguese professional sports club based in the city of Funchal, on the island of Madeira. Established in 1910, Marítimo is best known for its football team currently playing in the first tier Primeira Liga. The club's female team also feature in the top-tier Campeonato Nacional Feminino. Aside from football, Marítimo have teams in other sports competing in national leagues, such as volleyball, handball, roller hockey and athletics.

The football club has won one major trophy, the Campeonato de Portugal (Note: From 1922 to 1938, the Portuguese champion was determined by a knock-out competition called Campeonato de Portugal (Championship of Portugal). With the formation of the national league in 1934, this competition later became the Taça de Portugal (Portuguese Cup) in 1938) in 1926. After a long period of being restricted to regional competitions, Marítimo made their inaugural appearance in the national league in 1973 (Note: Between 1934 and 1972, due to logistical problems and the difficulties of travelling to the mainland, the clubs from the Portuguese islands were restricted from participating in the national championships and thus competed in their own island championships, such as those ran by the Madeira Football Association) and four years later became the first club based outside Portuguese continental territory to achieve promotion to the top division in 1977. Since then the club has played 43 seasons in the highest tier of Portuguese league football – ranking 10th on the all-time list – as well as being finalists of the Taça de Portugal twice, finalists of the Taça da Liga twice, winning the Segunda Divisão three times and achieving nine appearances in the UEFA Cup/Europa League. Marítimo's most recent foray into European competition came in 2017, though their best performance was during the 2012–13 season, finishing third in the Europa League group stage.

== History ==
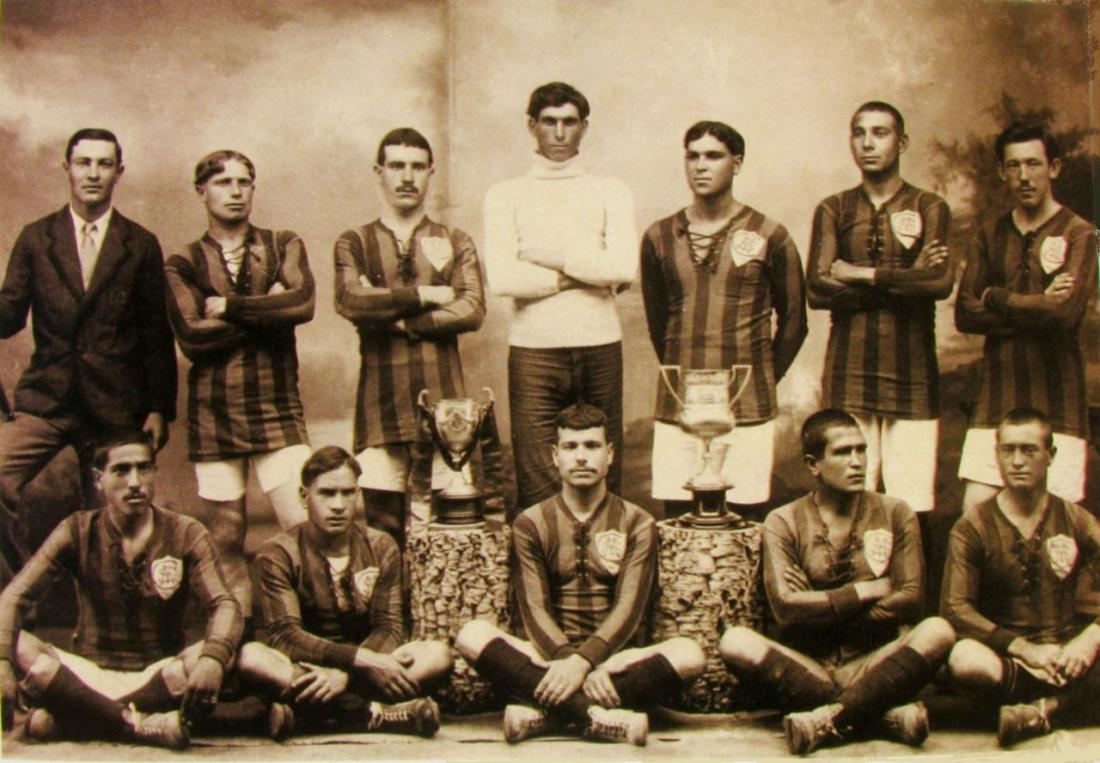
The team that won the first Championship of Madeira (1916–17)

Marítimo was founded on 20 September 1910 as Club Português de Sport Marítimo, by Cândido Fernandes de Gouveia. The club adopted the red and green colours of the new Republican flag of Portugal to distinguish themselves from rivals Club Sports da Madeira, who used the blue and white colours of the old monarchy flag which had been replaced 15 days earlier. The name Marítimo, meaning Maritime in English, was used to reflect the fact that many of the team's players were workers of the nearby Funchal docks, a prominent employer at the time. The first ever match for Marítimo was a 2–1 win against Santa Clara, a select team composed of workers of the Western Telegraph Company. Soon after they began playing teams of sailors from visiting British ships. José Rodrigues Barrinhas, an old-fashioned attacking centre-half, made a name for himself in these games and in matches against rivals CS Madeira.

In 1921–22, the Portuguese clubs started playing a new national competition. The Campeonato de Portugal, played on a knock-out-basis (similar to the current Taça de Portugal), was the first national competition. After competing in the regional championships, the regional winners competed together to pick the Champion of Portugal. Marítimo make 13 appearances in the 17 editions of the competition. After several attempts, the club finally won the Campeonato de Portugal in 1925–26. In the semi-final against Porto, Marítimo won 7–1, and in the final against Belenenses Marítimo won 2–0. It was after this great achievement that Marítimo was called "The Greatest of the Islands".

In the early 1930s, the club faced a serious financial crisis, although this did not affect its supremacy in the regional competitions. However, in 1934, a new national competition called Primeira Liga was created, in which teams outside the continental territory were excluded. Nevertheless, in 1938–39 the teams from the islands started to participate in the Taça de Portugal, after the champions of Madeira and Azores played a qualification round between themselves. Being excluded from competing in the Primeira Liga, the club continued playing in regional competitions. It was in this period that Marítimo won many of the Regional Championships. In 1950, the team went through an amazing tour of Africa in which they made some great achievements.

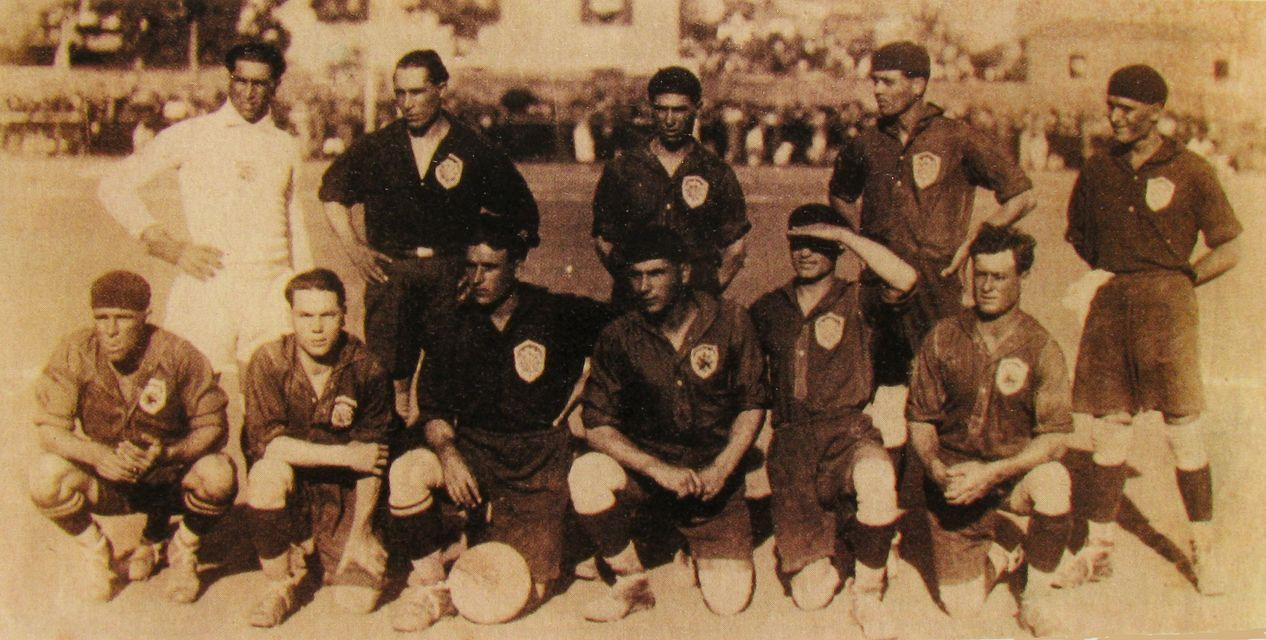
The team that won the Championship of Portugal (1925–26)

After arduous negotiations with the Portuguese Football Federation, it was established that the winner in the regional championship of 1972–73 could play a qualifying round with the last of the Segunda Divisão and the first of the Terceira Divisão. Marítimo won that regional championship and started to participate in the national championships. They therefore became the first team from a Portuguese island to participate in the national championship. Maritimo's record of 35 Madeira Championships won between 1916 and 1973 still stands.

The consequences of long years without being able to compete regularly in national competitions were visible in the beginning. The fact that the island was not able to put teams in national competitions showed the discrepancies in terms of infrastructures and organization between the regional and national reality. Yet in the 1976–77 season the club wins the II Divisão and rises to the Portuguese First Division, remaining there for over three seasons. Due to the existing semi-professionalism and some logistical difficulties, the club is relegated to Second Division in 1980–181, rising immediately next season, winning for the second time the II Divisão. After two seasons the club returns to Primeira Liga in the 1982–83 season. Since then the club has remained in the Primeira Liga, consolidating its status as a team that consistently finishes in the top ten and competes for European qualification.

Until the early 1990s, the club's best result in the Primeira Liga was ninth place in the 1987–88 season. The entry of a young coach, ambitious Brazilian Paulo Autuori, brought greater internal organisation and attractive attacking football, so that in the 1991–92 campaign the club reached seventh place. The 1992–93 season saw a "wonder-trio" (Ademir, Edmilson and Jorge Andrade) drive the club to have the third best attack in the league, with 56 goals. European qualification came on the final day of the season, with a 3–2 victory against Boavista earning a 5th place finish and qualification to the UEFA Cup. Again the club was a pioneer, being the first Portuguese island-based team to achieve qualification for European competitions. That same season is also notable for the home wins against Sporting (4–2) and Gil Vicente (7–0).

The club's first foray in Europe saw them defeated by Royal Antwerp in the first round of the 1993–94 UEFA Cup, however another fifth place finish at the end of the 1993–94 league campaign saw an immediate return to European competition for the 1994–95 UEFA Cup. A 1–0 win over Aarau saw the club earn their first European victory, before being eliminated by eventual finalists Juventus in the second round, with a 1–3 defeat on aggregate. Another great achievement was made during the season when the club qualified to the Taça de Portugal final for the first time in its history, after defeating Porto in the semi-finals 1–0. Marítimo disputed the final against Sporting, but lost 2–0 to a team featuring stars such as Luís Figo, Ricardo Sá Pinto, Ivaylo Yordanov and Krasimir Balakov. Six years later, in the 2000–01 season, Marítimo achieved another final appearance, after defeating Boavista in the semi-final 1–0. This time Marítimo played the final against Porto, losing again 2–0.

Throughout the early 2000s, the club achieved consistent top six finishes and featured regularly in European competitions, with memorable victories against Leeds United and Rangers. In the 2012–13 season, Marítimo qualified for the Europa League group stages for the first time, finishing third with a win against Club Brugge and two draws against Newcastle United.

In the 2014–15 season, Maritimo reached the Taça da Liga final for the first time ever, beating Porto in the semi-final but then losing to Benfica 2–1 in the final. The following season they repeated this feat, playing against Benfica again in the final, but losing 6–2. From then, the team suffered a steady decline, narrowly escaping relegation in the 2020–21 season, by 1 point, before finally yielding in 2022–23 ending a 38-year streak in the top division.

The team almost bounced straight back in the 2023–24 season, missing out on the promotion play-offs due to head-to-head results with third-place AVS. After three seasons in the Segunda Liga, on 26 April 2026, Marítimo finally secured their return to the top flight with 2–1 victory away to Benfica B, in front of 1,312 visiting Verde-Rubros supporters. A week later, on 1 May, Marítimo were crowned as league champions of the Segunda Liga following a 3–2 home victory over Leixões, in front of more than 10,000 fans at Estádio do Marítimo.

== Colours and crest ==
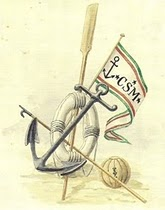
1910–1916

1917–1998

1999–2022

2022–present

Since the very beginning of the club's history, red and green have been the official colours. In 1910, the club adopted the red and green colours of the new Republican flag of Portugal to distinguish themselves from rivals Club Sports da Madeira, who used the blue and white colours of the old monarchy flag which had been replaced 15 days after the club's foundation, following the 5 October 1910 revolution.

Although there is no date or author, the first crest clearly refers to the maritime origins of the club, which is stated in the paddle, the float, the harpoon, and the anchor. The ball in the badge represents the sport played in the club.

For the 1916–17 season, a new crest was created by José Inês Ramos, a designer at an Embroidery House in Funchal. The new crest maintains the maritime roots of the club, expressed in the ship's wheel. However a Lion was included in the new crest, which was to symbolize the strength of the new Champion of Madeira. Since then the crest has remained the same, with only some minor graphical changes over the years. The crest was updated again in 1999 to a modern version, following the formation of the SAD organisation, however the classic logo remained on the team jerseys until 2008. In 2022, the club announced the return of the classic crest, used from 1916 to 1999, as the primary logo.

=== Kit evolution ===
1910	1926	1950	1985	1991	1994	2008	2012	2016
2018	2020	2023	2024

=== Kit sponsorship ===
Period	Kit manufacturer	Principle sponsor (Note: Only primary shirt partner shown)
1987–1988	Umbro	Madeira Tourism
1988–1989	Hummel	Madeira Tourism
1989–1991	Hummel	Banif Financial Group; Madeira Tourism
1991–1992	Diadora	Banco BCI
1992–1993	Diadora	O Madeirense
1993–1994	Hummel	Grupo Sá; Madeira Tourism
1994–1995	Olympic	Banif Financial Group
1995–1996	Saillev	Banif Financial Group
1996–2001	Saillev	Grupo Sá
2001–2002	Lotto	Grupo Sá
2002–2005	Lotto	Banif Financial Group
2005–2008	Tepa	Banif Financial Group
2008–2015	Lacatoni	Banif Financial Group
2015 (Note: Sponsor changed from Banif to Santander in December 2015, midway through 2015/16 season)	Nike	Banif Financial Group
2015–2019	Nike	Santander
2019–2022	Nike	Betano
2022–2026	Puma	Coral Cerveja; Madeira Tourism
2026–	Hummel	bwin Madeira Tourism

== Support ==
Supporters of Marítimo are known as Marítimistas. The club has around 12,000 registered members (known as sócios), ranking Marítimo as the 6th most supported club in Portugal; in their most recent season in the Primeira Liga, Marítimo also had the 6th highest average home match attendance. The club has three predominant supporter groups, the Claque Esquadrão Marítimista, the Ultras Templários and the Ultras Fanatics 13.

The club's anthem, Marcha do Marítimo, also known as Os Nossos Maravilhas, was written in 1950 following the team's successful tour of Africa, with lyrics by Rufino de Freitas and music composed by Rufino and his brothers José de Freitas and Mário de Jesus Freitas. It was first performed on 4 November 1950 at Funchal harbour, during celebrations welcoming the team home. Additional club anthems include Maritimo, o Glorioso!, written by João Luís Mendonça, and Duas Vezes Madeirense.

Famous persons who have publicly shown their support for Marítimo include businessman Joe Berardo, international footballer Cristiano Ronaldo - both are registered sócios of the club - and former president of the Regional Government of Madeira, Alberto João Jardim. Musician and 2017 Eurovision Song Contest winner Salvador Sobral has occasionally been seen wearing a Marítimo shirt during performances, and a viral video of indie band NAPA showed the group singing the club's anthem, Marcha do Marítimo, prior to their appearance at the 2025 Eurovision Song Contest.

Marítimo are known throughout the Portuguese-speaking world and have fan bases in former Portuguese colonies and regions with significant Portuguese communities; supporter clubs exist in London, Jersey, California, Angola and South Africa. The club maintains strong ties to a large Madeiran expat community in Venezuela and with affiliate club C.S. Marítimo de La Guaira; the four-time national champions were founded in 1959 by Madeiran fans of Marítimo. Similarly, Marítimo enjoys a presence in Cape Verde, where affiliate club Marítimo do Porto Novo compete in the Santo Antão South Island Championships. Since 2015, the club has also operated more than 70 youth football academies in Brazil, primarily in the states of Rio Grande do Sul and Santa Catarina, along with further academies in Argentina, the United States and Uruguay.

== Rivalries ==
Marítimo has held long-established rivalries with fellow Madeira-based teams Nacional and União; matches between the sides are referred to as the Madeira derby. Additionally, Marítimo also has a rivalry with Azores-based team Santa Clara; matches between the two archipelago-based teams are classified as the dérbi insular (Islands derby), with the first competitive game between the two teams (a 0-0 draw) taking place on 29 August 1999.

== Stadium ==
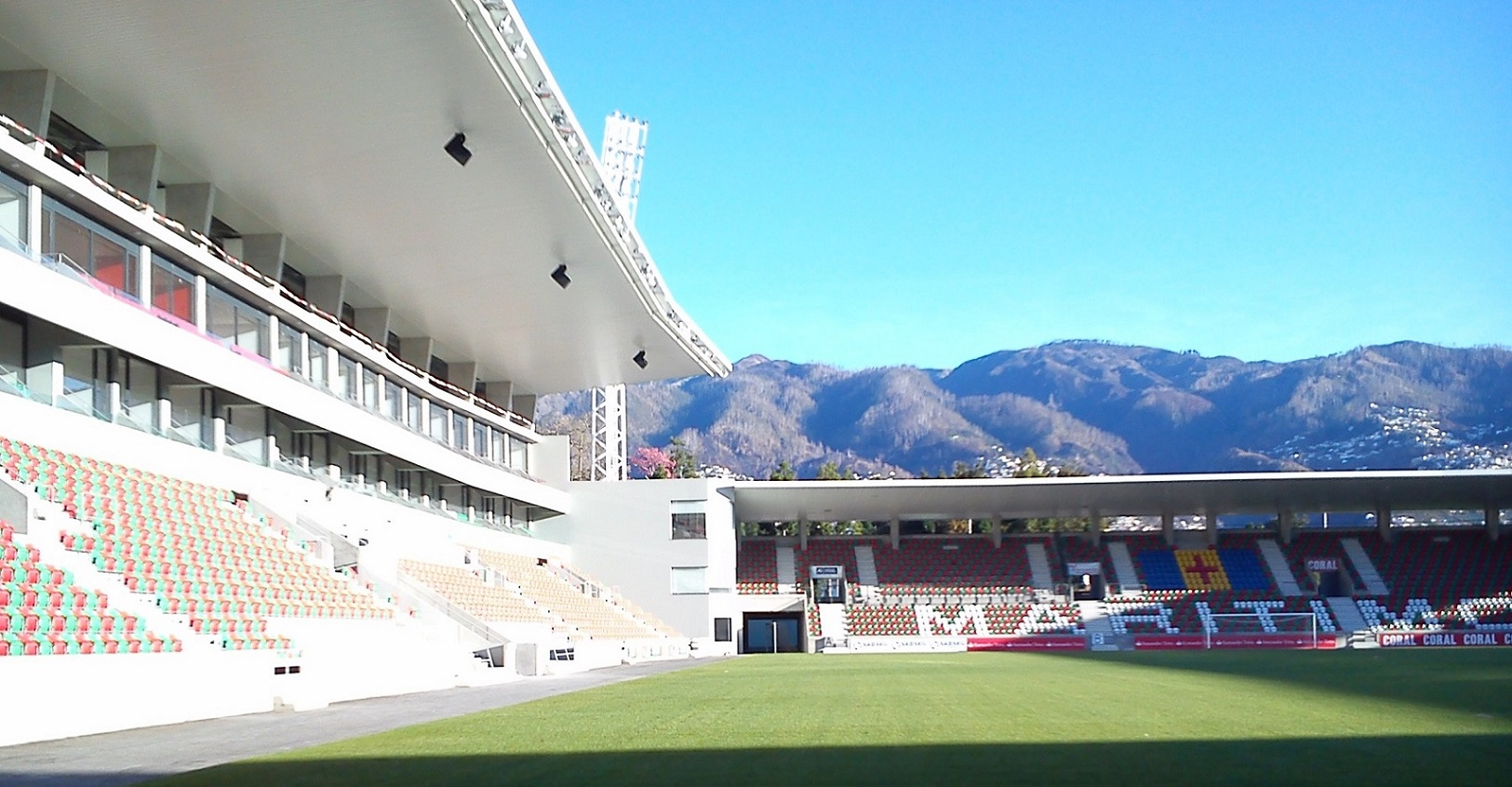
Marítimo Stadium

Previously playing at the Campo do Almirante Reis until they moved out in 1935, Marítimo currently play their home games at the Estádio do Marítimo, the municipality stadium of Funchal. The stadium was originally built by rival club Nacional but came into the hands of the local Government after the club fell into a financial crisis. Although uniquely picturesque the stadium was rapidly aging, despite numerous face lifts over the years.

In October 2006, it was announced that the club would construct a new state-of-the-art stadium in the Praia Formosa area of West Funchal. However, after several delays and a political war over funding and planning, the stadium plans were put on hold indefinitely, adding to a list of set-backs that stretch well over a decade. The fact that archrivals Nacional were allowed to construct a new stand and training facility at their Estádio da Madeira (with government backing) angered Marítimo's fans even more.

A year later, on 14 September 2007, an agreement between the club's directors and the Madeiran government (of whom own a 40% share of the club) was reached to use the site of the current Estádio dos Barreiros as the location of a brand new, reconstructed commercial stadium. Work began on the new stadium on 20 July 2009, with the realigning of the pitch and demolition of the Bancada Nascente, reducing the capacity to 5,000 seats in the Bancada Central stand. Initial plans indicated that the stadium would be completed by 2011 but following the 2010 flooding disaster, the local government withdrew its funding and construction was halted. The club continued to use the stadium with only the Bancada Central (main stand) usable as the other three sides of the pitch were incomplete. On 25 March 2013, the club opened a new museum and club shop adjacent to the stadium.

After a four-year hiatus, the local government pledged €12 million towards the project and construction of the stadium resumed in May 2014. The initial work focused on finishing the three stands that had been left incomplete from the previous work and so a further reduction in capacity was made, bringing the number of usable seats to just 4,000. The new stands were finished and open to the public in January 2015, with the first game being played in front of 7,000 spectators on 18 January against Braga. The following week, demolition started on the main stand to make way for the completion of the stadium project. The current capacity of the stadium is 9,500, which will be boosted to 10,600 once the construction of the stands is complete (2 December).

The club also own the Campo da Imaculada Conceição, a small stadium in the north of Funchal. The land it stands on was purchased by supporters and donated to the club who thus constructed the stadium, which was officially inaugurated on 3 October 1965. Situated adjacent to the club's Complexo Desportivo, the ground is used for B team-matches and for training sessions.

=== Attendances ===
Marítimo have consistently been one of the most attended teams in the Portuguese League and throughout the 1990s were often ranked as having the fourth-highest attendance and support after the big three clubs. A reduction in stadium capacity in the late 1990s, due to seating replacing all-standing areas, saw attendance numbers decline. From 2009 works to reconstruct the stadium saw a further temporary reduction in capacity to just 5,000 seats, until the newly-renovated project was completed in 2016, raising the capacity to over 10,600 seats.

Season	Mean
1985–86	13,800
1986–87	12,633
1987–88	10,447
1988–89	9,789
1989–90	8,265
1990–91	8,842
1991–92	7,471
1992–93	8,941

Season	Mean
1993–94	10,941
1994–95	10,294
1995–96	8,176
1996–97	4,853
1997–98	5,353
1998–99	4,794
1999–00	7,412
2000–01	5,353

Season	Mean
2001–02	4,559
2002–03	5,147
2003–04	4,735
2004–05	3,882
2005–06	4,324
2006–07	4,167
2007–08	5,825
2008–09	4,941

Season	Mean
2009–10	3,490
2010–11	3,440
2011–12	3,827
2012–13	3,706
2013–14	3,550
2014–15	4,511
2015–16	6,146
2016–17	7,818

Season	Mean
2017–18	7,072
2018–19	6,622
2019–20	6,068
2020–21	0 (Note: There was no match attendance due to the COVID-19 pandemic)
2021–22	3,808
2022–23	8,509
2023–24	7,320
2024–25	5,579

Season	Mean
2025–26	7,658

Source: European Football Statistics

== Honours ==
=== National ===
- Campeonato de Portugal (First tier)
  - Winners (1): 1925–26
- Segunda Divisão / Segunda Liga (Second tier)
  - Winners (3): 1976–77, 1981–82, 2025–26

=== Regional ===
- AF Madeira Championship
  - Winners (35) – Record: 1916–17, 1917–18, 1921–22, 1922–23, 1923–24, 1924–25, 1925–26, 1926–27, 1928–29, 1929–30, 1930–31, 1932–33, 1935–36, 1939–40, 1940–41, 1944–45, 1945–46, 1946–47, 1947–48, 1948–49, 1949–50, 1950–51, 1951–52, 1952–53, 1953–54, 1954–55, 1955–56, 1957–58, 1965–66, 1966–67, 1967–68, 1969–70, 1970–71, 1971–72, 1972–73
- AF Madeira Cup
  - Winners (26) – Record: 1946–47, 1947–48, 1949–50, 1950–51, 1951–52, 1952–53, 1953–54, 1954–55, 1955–56, 1958–59, 1959–60, 1965–66, 1966–67, 1967–68, 1968–69, 1969–70, 1970–71, 1971–72, 1978–79, 1980–81, 1981–82, 1984–85, 1997–98, 2006–07, 2008–09, 2017–18

== Players ==
=== Current squad ===
As of 10 September 2026

No.	Pos.	Nation	Player
1	GK	POR	Gonçalo Tabuaço
2	DF	BRA	Igor Julião
3	DF	ENG	Nathanael Ogbeta
4	DF	POR	Rafael Fernandes (on loan from Lille)
5	DF	POR	Nilton Varela
6	MF	POR	Rodrigo Andrade
7	FW	VEN	Enrique Zauner
8	MF	SUI	Maxime Dominguez
9	FW	POR	José Melro
10	MF	ESP	Martín Tejón
11	FW	MAR	Simo Bouzaidi
12	FW	CGO	Mons Bassouamina
13	GK	ESP	Alfonso Pastor
14	MF	POR	Raphael Guzzo
15	DF	POR	Tomás Tavares
16	MF	POR	Francisco Silva

No.	Pos.	Nation	Player
17	FW	ESP	Adrián Butzke
18	MF	BIH	Vladan Danilović
20	FW	POR	Francisco Gomes
21	MF	NGR	Ibrahim Alani
22	DF	HUN	Gábor Szalai (on loan from Ferencvárosi)
23	DF	POR	Paulo Henrique
25	MF	ESP	Yellu Santiago (on loan from Verona)
27	FW	GER	Samuel Bamba
30	GK	ESP	Fran Vieites
34	GK	MOZ	Kimiss Zavala
35	FW	BEL	Bryan Limbombe
44	DF	POR	Romain Correia (captain)
66	MF	NGR	Israel Ayuma (on loan from Istra 1961)
68	MF	POR	Nélio Batista
90	FW	GER	Maurice Boakye

=== Out on loan ===
Note: Flags indicate national team as defined under FIFA eligibility rules; some limited exceptions apply. Players may hold more than one non-FIFA nationality.

No. / Pos. / Nation / Player; — / GK / POR / Pedro Teixeira (at Camacha until 30 June 2027)	No. / Pos. / Nation / Player; — / MF / POR / Pedrinho (at Camacha until 30 June 2027)

=== Reserve and youth teams ===
For B-team players, see C.S. Marítimo B. For Under-23 team players, see C.S. Marítimo Sub-23. For youth team players, see C.S. Marítimo Juniors.

=== Notable players ===
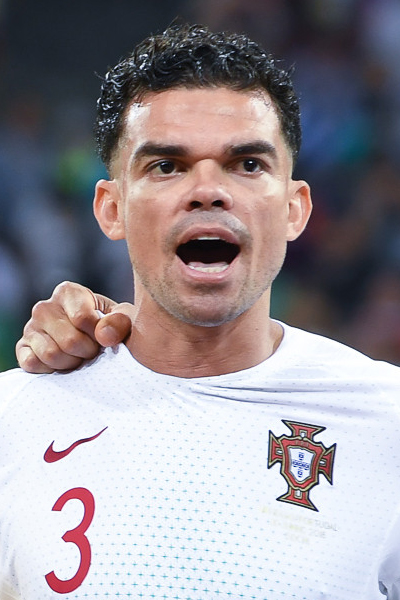
Pepe played for Marítimo between 2001 and 2004.

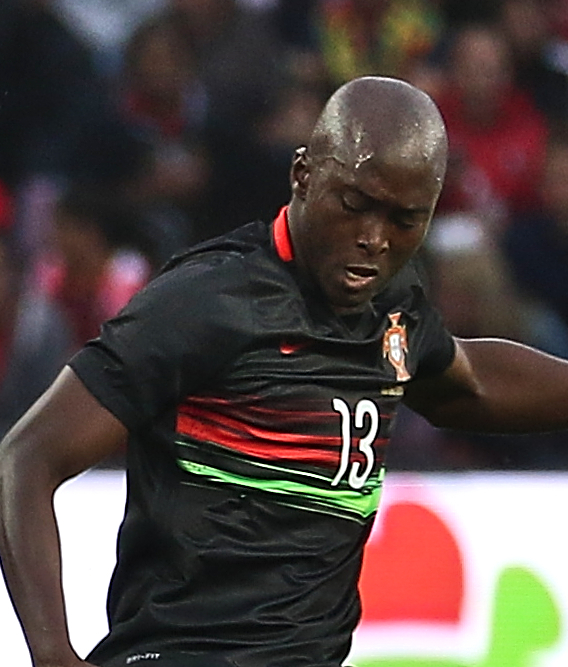
Danilo Pereira played for Marítimo from 2013 to 2015.

Including only players with at least 100 appearances at the club, or who has appeared for their international team.

- (Portugal) Adelino Nunes
- (Portugal) António Oliveira
- (Portugal) Ariza Makukula
- (Portugal) Bruno Fernandes
- (Portugal) Carlos Jorge
- (Portugal) Danilo Pereira
- (Portugal) Danny
- (Portugal) Dyego Sousa
- (Portugal) Eduardo Luís
- (Portugal) Fernando Santos
- (Portugal) Jorge Costa
- (Portugal) Jorge Silva
- (Portugal) José Ramos
- (Portugal) José Sá
- (Portugal) Nuno Valente
- (Portugal) Paulo Alves
- (Portugal) Paulo Madeira
- (Portugal) Pepe
- (Portugal) Pinga
- (Portugal) Vado
- (Portugal) Zeca
- (Angola) Djalma
- (Armenia) Gevorg Ghazaryan
- (Brazil) Christian
- (Brazil) Danilo Dias
- (Brazil) Edmilson
- (Brazil) Ewerton
- (Brazil) Kléber
- (Brazil) Léo Lima
- (Brazil) Manduca
- (Brazil) Marcinho
- (Brazil) Roberto Sousa
- (Brazil) Serginho Chulapa
- (Brazil) Souza
- (Bulgaria) Ilian Iliev
- (Cape Verde) Héldon Ramos
- (Canada) Alex Bunbury
- (Canada) Fernando Aguiar
- (Chile) Alex von Schwedler
- (Egypt) Abdel Sattar Sabry
- (England) John Richards
- (Guinea-Bissau) Nanu
- (Iran) Amir Abedzadeh
- (Japan) Daizen Maeda
- (Mali) Moussa Marega
- (Netherlands) Mitchell van der Gaag
- (Niger) Moussa Maâzou
- (Nigeria) Sylvanus Okpala
- (Northern Ireland) Colin Hill
- (Senegal) Baba Diawara
- (South Korea) Suk Hyun-Jun
- (Tunisia) Selim Benachour
- (Zambia) Collins Mbesuma

== Personnel ==
=== Coaching staff ===
Nationality	Name	Position
(Portugal)	Miguel Moita	Head coach
(Portugal)	Marco Leite	Assistant coach
(Portugal)	João Cortesão	First team coach
(Portugal)	Edgar Costa	First team coach
(Portugal)	Fernando Monteiro	Goalkeeping coach
(Portugal)	Bernardo Ramos	Exercise Physiologist
(Portugal)	Rui Carvalho	Analyst
(Portugal)	Fernando Teixeira	Physiotherapist
(Portugal)	João Moura	Team Manager

=== Coaching history ===
Name	Nationality	Years
János Hrotkó	(Hungary)	1966–67
Pedro Gomes	(Portugal)	1974–75
Hilário da Conceição	(Portugal)	1975–76
Pedro Gomes	(Portugal)	1976–77
Luís Agrela	(Portugal)	1977
Fernando Vaz	(Portugal)	1977–79
Manuel Oliveira	(Portugal)	1979
António Medeiros	(Portugal)	1979–81
Ângelo Gomes	(Portugal)	1981
Fernando Mendes	(Portugal)	1 July 1981 – 30 June 1982
Pedro Gomes	(Portugal)	1982
Mário Lino	(Portugal)	1982–84
Mário Nunes	(Portugal)	1985
António Oliveira	(Portugal)	1985–86
Stefan Lundin	(Sweden)	1 July 1986 – 30 June 1987
Manuel Oliveira	(Portugal)	1987–88
Ferreira da Costa	(Portugal)	1988–89
Quinito	(Portugal)	1989–90
Ferreira da Costa	(Portugal)	1990
Paulo Autuori	(Brazil)	1 July 1991–93
Edinho	(Brazil)	1993–94
Paulo Autuori	(Brazil)	1994 – 30 June 1995
Raul Águas	(Portugal)	1995–96
Marinho Peres	(Brazil)	1996
Manuel José	(Portugal)	1996
Augusto Inácio	(Portugal)	1996–99
Nelo Vingada	(Portugal)	1999–03
Anatoliy Byshovets	(Russia)	2003
Manuel Cajuda	(Portugal)	1 July 2003 – 31 Aug 2004
Mariano Barreto	(Portugal)	Sept 6, 2004 – 19 March 2005
Juca	(Portugal)	21 March 2005 – Sept 19, 2005
João Abel (interim)	(Portugal)	Sept 20, 2005 – Sept 25, 2005

Name	Nationality	Years
Paulo Bonamigo	(Brazil)	Sept 24, 2005 – 13 May 2006
Ulisses Morais	(Portugal)	16 March 2006 – 31 March 2007
Alberto Pazos	(Spain)	7 April 2007 – 4 June 2007
Sebastião Lazaroni	(Brazil)	20 May 2007 – 17 May 2008
Lori Sandri	(Brazil)	2 June 2008 – 23 Feb 2009
Carlos Carvalhal	(Portugal)	24 Feb 2009 – Sept 28, 2009
Mitchell van der Gaag	(Netherlands)	Sept 29, 2009 – Sept 14, 2010
Pedro Martins	(Portugal)	Sept 15, 2010 – 31 May 2014
Leonel Pontes	(Portugal)	1 July 2014 – 3 March 2015
Ivo Vieira	(Portugal)	3 March 2015 – 18 Jan 2016
Nelo Vingada	(Portugal)	19 Jan 2016 – 23 May 2016
Paulo César Gusmão	(Brazil)	1 June 2016 – 19 September 2016
Daniel Ramos	(Portugal)	22 September 2016 – 7 June 2018
Cláudio Braga	(Portugal)	12 June 2018 – 26 November 2018
Petit	(Portugal)	27 November 2018 – 31 May 2019
Nuno Manta	(Portugal)	4 June 2019 – 11 November 2019
José Gomes	(Portugal)	14 November 2019 – 27 July 2020
Lito Vidigal	(Angola)	3 August 2020 – 4 December 2020
Milton Mendes	(Brazil)	4 December 2020 – 8 March 2021
Julio Velázquez	(Spain)	11 March 2021 –11 November 2021
Vasco Seabra	(Portugal)	14 November 2021 – 5 September 2022
João Henriques	(Portugal)	8 September 2022 – 14 December 2022
José Gomes	(Portugal)	14 December 2022 – 13 June 2023
Tulipa	(Portugal)	16 June 2023 – 5 December 2023
Fábio Pereira	(Portugal)	7 December 2023 – 4 September 2024
Jorge Silas	(Portugal)	5 September 2024 – 17 October 2024
Rui Duarte	(Portugal)	20 October 2024 – 6 January 2025
Ivo Vieira	(Portugal)	8 January 2025 – 21 May 2025
Vítor Matos	(Portugal)	12 June 2025 – 22 November 2025
Miguel Moita	(Portugal)	25 November 2025 – 18 May 2026
Mitchell van der Gaag	(Netherlands)	15 June 2026 – present

== Presidents ==
- Joaquim Pontes – (1910–13)
- Manuel Humberto Passos Freitas – (1910–13)
- César Marcelino Vieira – (1914–17)
- Pedro Auguesto Gouveia – (1917–21)
- Francisco Aquino Baptista Santos – (1921–22)
- Joaquim Quintino Travassos Lopes – (1922–27)
- António Felix Pita – (1927–28)
- Joaquim Quintino Travassos Lopes – (1928–30)
- Alváro Menezes Alves Reis Gomes – (1930–31)
- Jordão Menezes Azevedo – (1931–32)
- Amâncio Franco Olim Marote – (1932)
- Fernando Augusto Câmara – (1932–33)
- Jaime Elói Luis – (1933–34)
- José Marcos Freitas Morna – (1934–35)
- Álvaro Menezes Alves Reis Gomes – (1935–36)
- João Carlos de Sousa – (1936–39)
- Eduardo Ferreira T. S. Albergaria – (1939–40)
- João Gouveia Menezes – (1940–43)
- Amaro Magno Ferreira – (1943–45)
- João Carlos de Sousa – (1945–47)
- Manuel Rodrigues Gouveia – (1947–48)
- Carlos Sousa – (1948–50)
- João Carlos de Sousa – (1950–52)
- João Lemos Gomes – (1952–53)
- João Carlos de Sousa – (1953–54)
- Jaime Ornelas Camacho – (1954–55)
- João José Pita da Silva – (1955–59)
- Henrique Viera da Luz – (1959–68)
- Bacili Alcino Dionísio – (1968–73)
- José Miguel Jardim Olival Mendonça – (1973–78)
- Nicolau Alberto A. Drumond Borges – (1978–81)
- Manuel Honório Ferreira de Sousa – (1981–82)
- António Silva Henriques – (1982–88)
- Rui Emanuel Baptista Fontes – (1988–97)
- José Carlos Rodrigues Pereira – (1997–2021)
- Rui Emanuel Baptista Fontes – (2021–2023)
- Carlos André Gomes – (2023–Present)

== Statistics and records ==
=== Recent seasons ===
Season	Div	Pos	Pld	W	D	L	GF	GA	Pts	Top league scorer	Goals	TP	TL	UEL
2016–17	1D	6	34	13	11	10	34	32	50	Raul Silva	7	R4	R3	—
2017–18	1D	7	34	13	8	13	36	49	47	Joel Tagueu	9	R5	R3	PO
2018–19	1D	11	34	12	3	19	26	44	39	Joel Tagueu	8	R4	R3	—
2019–20	1D	11	34	9	12	13	34	42	39	Rodrigo Pinho	9	R3	R3	—
2020–21	1D	15	34	10	5	19	27	47	35	Pinho/Joel	9	QF	—	—
2021–22	1D	10	34	9	11	14	39	44	38	Joel Tagueu	9	R3	R1	—
2022–23	1D	↓ 16	34	7	5	22	32	63	26	André Vidigal	8	R3	R1	—
2023–24	2D	4	34	18	10	6	52	29	64	Lucas Silva	13	R4	R1	—
2024–25	2D	12	34	10	13	11	42	48	43	Martim Tavares	7	R1	—	—
2025–26	2D	↑ 1	34	20	6	8	50	29	66	Carlos Daniel	11	R2	—	—

- Last updated: 24 May 2026
- Div = Division; Pos = Position in Primeira Liga; Pld = Played; W = Won; D = Drawn; L = Lost; GF = Goals for; GA = Goals against; Pts = Points
- TP = Taça de Portugal (Portuguese Cup); TL = Taça da Liga (Portuguese League Cup); UEL = UEFA Europa League
- R5 = Fifth round R4 = Fourth round; R3 = Third round; R2 = Second round; R1 = First round; PO = Play-off; GS = Group stage; R64 = Round of 64; R32 = Round of 32; R16 = Round of 16; QF = Quarter-finals; SF = Semi-finals; RU = Runners-up; W = Winners

=== European competition ===
Updated 24 August 2017.

Season	Competition	Round	Opponent	Home	Away	Aggregate
1993–94	UEFA Cup	R1	(Belgium) Royal Antwerp	2–2	0–2	2–4
1994–95	UEFA Cup	R1	(Switzerland) Aarau	1–0	0–0	1–0
1994–95	UEFA Cup	R2	(Italy) Juventus	0–1	1–2	1–3
1998–99	UEFA Cup	R1	(England) Leeds United	1–0	0–1	1–1 (1–4 p)
2001–02	UEFA Cup	QR	(Bosnia and Herzegovina) FK Sarajevo	1–0	1–0	2–0
2001–02	UEFA Cup	R1	(England) Leeds United	1–0	0–3	1–3
2004–05	UEFA Cup	R1	(Scotland) Rangers	1–0	0–1	1–1 (2–4 p)
2008–09	UEFA Cup	R1	(Spain) Valencia	0–1	1–2	1–3
2010–11	Europa League	2QR	(Republic of Ireland) Sporting Fingal	3–2	3–2	6–4
2010–11	Europa League	3QR	(Wales) Bangor City	8–2	2–1	10–3
2010–11	Europa League	PO	(Belarus) BATE Borisov	1–2	0–3	1–5
2012–13	Europa League	3QR	(Greece) Asteras Tripolis	0–0	1–1	1–1 (a)
2012–13	Europa League	PO	(Georgia (country)) Dila Gori	1–0	2–0	3–0
2012–13	Europa League	GS	(France) Bordeaux	1–1	0–1	3rd
2012–13	Europa League	GS	(England) Newcastle United	0–0	1–1	3rd
2012–13	Europa League	GS	(Belgium) Club Brugge	2–1	0–2	3rd
2017–18	Europa League	3QR	(Bulgaria) Botev Plovdiv	2–0	0–0	2–0
2017–18	Europa League	PO	(Ukraine) FC Dynamo Kyiv	0–0	1–3	1–3

=== UEFA club coefficient ranking ===
Updated 14 July 2017.

Rank	Team	Points
159	(Ukraine) FC Oleksandriya	7.786
160	(Ukraine) FC Metalurh Donetsk	7.786
161	(Portugal) C.S. Marítimo	7.783
162	(Netherlands) Vitesse Arnhem	7.549
163	(Azerbaijan) Gabala FK	7.525

== Other sports ==
Like many other Portuguese clubs, Marítimo operates several sports teams outside of the football team. Although they are most recognisably successful in professional volleyball (See Marítimo volleyball), the club also field a prominent handball team (See Marítimo handball), a National Championship-winning women's basketball team and a popular futsal team (See Marítimo futsal). Other sports groups within the organisation include athletics, figure skating, fishing, futsal, karate, kart racing, rallying, rhythmic gymnastics, roller hockey, rugby union and swimming.

== See also ==
- Madeira derby
- C.S. Marítimo B
- C.S. Marítimo C
- C.S. Marítimo de Venezuela
- C.S. Marítimo (futsal)
- C.S. Marítimo (handball)
- C.S. Maritimo (volleyball)

== Bibliography ==
- Calisto, Luís (2001). Bola e Mergulhança (in Portuguese). Funchal: Tribuna da Madeira.
- Rodrigues, Deodato (2000). História do Club Sport Marítimo 1910–2000 (in Portuguese). Funchal: Diário de Notícias da Madeira.
