= 2000 European Men's Handball Championship =

2000 edition of the European Men's Handball Championship

Tournament details
- Host country: Croatia
- Venues: 2 (in 2 host cities)
- Dates: 21–30 January
- Teams: 12 (from 1 confederation)

Final positions
- Champions: Sweden (3rd title)
- Runners-up: Russia
- Third place: Spain
- Fourth place: France

Tournament statistics
- Matches played: 38
- Goals scored: 1,867 (49.13 per match)
- Attendance: 113,750 (2,993 per match)
- Top scorers: (Ukraine) Oleg Velyky (46 goals)

Awards
- Best player: (France) Jackson Richardson

The 2000 European Men's Handball Championship was the fourth edition of the tournament and was held in Croatia from 21 to 30 January 2000, in the cities of Zagreb and Rijeka. Sweden won the tournament after defeating Russia in the final, while Spain finished third.

== Qualification ==
Country	Qualified as	Previous appearances in tournament
Croatia	Host	3 (1994, 1996, 1998)
Sweden	Defending champion	3 (**1994**, 1996, **1998**)
Denmark	Playoff winner	2 (1994, 1996)
France	Playoff winner	3 (1994, 1996, 1998)
Germany	Playoff winner	3 (1994, 1996, 1998)
Iceland	Playoff winner	0 (Debut)
Norway	Playoff winner	0 (Debut)
Portugal	Playoff winner	1 (1994)
Russia	Playoff winner	3 (1994, **1996**, 1998)
Slovenia	Playoff winner	2 (1994, 1996)
Spain	Playoff winner	3 (1994, 1996, 1998)
Ukraine	Playoff winner	0 (Debut)

Note: Bold indicates champion for that year. Italic indicates host for that year.

== Venues ==
Two Croatian cities were selected as hosts for the 2000 Championship:

Rijeka	2000 European Men's Handball Championship is located in Croatia	Zagreb
Dvorana Mladosti; Capacity: 4,000	2000 European Men's Handball Championship is located in Croatia	Dom Športova; Capacity: 7,000

== Preliminary round ==
All times are local (UTC+1).

=== Group A ===
Pos	Team	Pld	W	D	L	GF	GA	GD	Pts	Qualification
1	France	5	4	1	0	127	110	+17	9	Semifinals
2	Spain	5	4	0	1	128	120	+8	8	Semifinals
3	Croatia (H)	5	3	1	1	122	114	+8	7	Fifth place game
4	Norway	5	1	1	3	106	114	−8	3	Seventh place game
5	Germany	5	0	2	3	110	119	−9	2	Ninth place game
6	Ukraine	5	0	1	4	104	120	−16	1	Eleventh place game

Source: EHF
Rules for classification: 1) points; 2) head-to-head points; 3) head-to-head goal difference; 4) head-to-head number of goals scored; 5) goal difference.
(H) Hosts

21 January 2000; 16:30	**France**	**24–21**	**Norway**	Dom Sportova, Zagreb; Attendance: 1,500; Referees: Litvinov, Khudoerko (RUS)
21 January 2000; 16:30	Gille 6	(14–12)	Berge 6	Dom Sportova, Zagreb; Attendance: 1,500; Referees: Litvinov, Khudoerko (RUS)
21 January 2000; 16:30	4× (yellow card) 4× (suspension)	Report	2× (yellow card) 6× (suspension)	Dom Sportova, Zagreb; Attendance: 1,500; Referees: Litvinov, Khudoerko (RUS)

21 January 2000; 18:30	**Germany**	**24–24**	**Ukraine**	Dom Sportova, Zagreb; Attendance: 2,500; Referees: Boye, Jensen (DEN)
21 January 2000; 18:30	Baur 8	(14–11)	Velyky 12	Dom Sportova, Zagreb; Attendance: 2,500; Referees: Boye, Jensen (DEN)
21 January 2000; 18:30	4× (yellow card) 4× (suspension)	Report	3× (yellow card) 3× (suspension)	Dom Sportova, Zagreb; Attendance: 2,500; Referees: Boye, Jensen (DEN)

21 January 2000; 21:00	**Spain**	**27–22**	**Croatia**	Dom Sportova, Zagreb; Attendance: 10,000; Referees: Hansson, Olsson (SWE)
21 January 2000; 21:00	Guijosa 6	(16–11)	Smajlagić 6	Dom Sportova, Zagreb; Attendance: 10,000; Referees: Hansson, Olsson (SWE)
21 January 2000; 21:00	3× (yellow card) 5× (suspension)	Report	2× (yellow card) 4× (suspension)	Dom Sportova, Zagreb; Attendance: 10,000; Referees: Hansson, Olsson (SWE)

22 January 2000; 17:00	**Norway**	**21–25**	**Spain**	Dom Sportova, Zagreb; Attendance: 1,600; Referees: Pendić, Majstorović (FRY)
22 January 2000; 17:00	Ellingsen, Penne 5	(9–13)	Dujshevaev, Xepkin 7	Dom Sportova, Zagreb; Attendance: 1,600; Referees: Pendić, Majstorović (FRY)
22 January 2000; 17:00	2× (yellow card) 3× (suspension)	Report	3× (yellow card) 6× (suspension)	Dom Sportova, Zagreb; Attendance: 1,600; Referees: Pendić, Majstorović (FRY)

22 January 2000; 19:00	**Croatia**	**21–20**	**Germany**	Dom Sportova, Zagreb; Attendance: 9,500; Referees: Migas, Bavas (GRE)
22 January 2000; 19:00	Saračević 7	(11–12)	Kretzschmar 7	Dom Sportova, Zagreb; Attendance: 9,500; Referees: Migas, Bavas (GRE)
22 January 2000; 19:00	4× (yellow card) 3× (suspension)	Report	3× (yellow card) 4× (suspension)	Dom Sportova, Zagreb; Attendance: 9,500; Referees: Migas, Bavas (GRE)

22 January 2000; 21:00	**Ukraine**	**22–24**	**France**	Dom Sportova, Zagreb; Attendance: 1,000; Referees: Nachevski, Nachevski (MKD)
22 January 2000; 21:00	Velyky 8	(9–12)	Cazal 8	Dom Sportova, Zagreb; Attendance: 1,000; Referees: Nachevski, Nachevski (MKD)
22 January 2000; 21:00	3× (yellow card) 3× (suspension)	Report	3× (yellow card) 4× (suspension)	Dom Sportova, Zagreb; Attendance: 1,000; Referees: Nachevski, Nachevski (MKD)

23 January 2000; 17:00	**Spain**	**27–24**	**Ukraine**	Dom Sportova, Zagreb; Attendance: 1,000; Referees: Boye, Jensen (DEN)
23 January 2000; 17:00	Guijosa 7	(17–11)	Velyky 10	Dom Sportova, Zagreb; Attendance: 1,000; Referees: Boye, Jensen (DEN)
23 January 2000; 17:00	3× (yellow card) 1× (suspension)	Report	3× (yellow card) 4× (suspension)	Dom Sportova, Zagreb; Attendance: 1,000; Referees: Boye, Jensen (DEN)

23 January 2000; 19:00	**Germany**	**19–25**	**France**	Dom Sportova, Zagreb; Attendance: 5,000; Referees: Litvinov, Khudoerko (RUS)
23 January 2000; 19:00	Kretzschmar 6	(9–15)	Richardson 8	Dom Sportova, Zagreb; Attendance: 5,000; Referees: Litvinov, Khudoerko (RUS)
23 January 2000; 19:00	3× (yellow card) 4× (suspension) 1× (red card)	Report	3× (yellow card) 3× (suspension)	Dom Sportova, Zagreb; Attendance: 5,000; Referees: Litvinov, Khudoerko (RUS)

23 January 2000; 21:00	**Croatia**	**27–23**	**Norway**	Dom Sportova, Zagreb; Attendance: 9,500; Referees: Nachevski, Nachevski (MKD)
23 January 2000; 21:00	Bilić 8	(15–10)	Oustorp, Penne 5	Dom Sportova, Zagreb; Attendance: 9,500; Referees: Nachevski, Nachevski (MKD)
23 January 2000; 21:00	3× (yellow card) 10× (suspension) 1× (red card)	Report	4× (yellow card) 3× (suspension)	Dom Sportova, Zagreb; Attendance: 9,500; Referees: Nachevski, Nachevski (MKD)

25 January 2000; 17:00	**France**	**28–22**	**Spain**	Dvorana Mladosti, Rijeka; Attendance: 2,000; Referees: Hansson, Olsson (SWE)
25 January 2000; 17:00	Cazal 8	(16–12)	Masip 9	Dvorana Mladosti, Rijeka; Attendance: 2,000; Referees: Hansson, Olsson (SWE)
25 January 2000; 17:00	3× (yellow card) 5× (suspension)	Report	2× (yellow card) 3× (suspension)	Dvorana Mladosti, Rijeka; Attendance: 2,000; Referees: Hansson, Olsson (SWE)

25 January 2000; 19:00	**Germany**	**22–22**	**Norway**	Dvorana Mladosti, Rijeka; Attendance: 2,000; Referees: Pendić, Majstorović (FRY)
25 January 2000; 19:00	Roos 11	(11–10)	Jensen 7	Dvorana Mladosti, Rijeka; Attendance: 2,000; Referees: Pendić, Majstorović (FRY)
25 January 2000; 19:00	3× (yellow card) 6× (suspension)	Report	2× (yellow card) 2× (suspension)	Dvorana Mladosti, Rijeka; Attendance: 2,000; Referees: Pendić, Majstorović (FRY)

25 January 2000; 21:00	**Ukraine**	**18–26**	**Croatia**	Dvorana Mladosti, Rijeka; Attendance: 3,000; Referees: Klúcsó, Lekrinszki (HUN)
25 January 2000; 21:00	Nat 5	(9–13)	Saračević 8	Dvorana Mladosti, Rijeka; Attendance: 3,000; Referees: Klúcsó, Lekrinszki (HUN)
25 January 2000; 21:00	2× (yellow card) 3× (suspension)	Report	3× (yellow card) 3× (suspension)	Dvorana Mladosti, Rijeka; Attendance: 3,000; Referees: Klúcsó, Lekrinszki (HUN)

27 January 2000; 17:00	**Norway**	**19–16**	**Ukraine**	Dvorana Mladosti, Rijeka; Attendance: 700; Referees: Migas, Bavas (GRE)
27 January 2000; 17:00	Rasch 6	(12–7)	four players 3	Dvorana Mladosti, Rijeka; Attendance: 700; Referees: Migas, Bavas (GRE)
27 January 2000; 17:00	3× (yellow card) 5× (suspension)	Report	3× (yellow card) 3× (suspension)	Dvorana Mladosti, Rijeka; Attendance: 700; Referees: Migas, Bavas (GRE)

27 January 2000; 19:00	**Spain**	**27–25**	**Germany**	Dvorana Mladosti, Rijeka; Attendance: 3,000; Referees: Boye, Jensen (DEN)
27 January 2000; 19:00	Guijosa, Masip 6	(12–9)	Baur, Roos 6	Dvorana Mladosti, Rijeka; Attendance: 3,000; Referees: Boye, Jensen (DEN)
27 January 2000; 19:00	4× (yellow card) 2× (suspension)	Report	3× (yellow card) 4× (suspension)	Dvorana Mladosti, Rijeka; Attendance: 3,000; Referees: Boye, Jensen (DEN)

27 January 2000; 21:00	**France**	**26–26**	**Croatia**	Dvorana Mladosti, Rijeka; Attendance: 3,500; Referees: Bülow, Lübker (GER)
27 January 2000; 21:00	Cazal 8	(12–11)	Kljaić 6	Dvorana Mladosti, Rijeka; Attendance: 3,500; Referees: Bülow, Lübker (GER)
27 January 2000; 21:00	4× (yellow card) 7× (suspension)	Report	2× (yellow card) 4× (suspension)	Dvorana Mladosti, Rijeka; Attendance: 3,500; Referees: Bülow, Lübker (GER)

=== Group B ===
Pos	Team	Pld	W	D	L	GF	GA	GD	Pts	Qualification
1	Sweden	5	5	0	0	143	115	+28	10	Semifinals
2	Russia	5	4	0	1	128	120	+8	8	Semifinals
3	Slovenia	5	2	0	3	129	131	−2	4 (Note: Slovenia 2 Pts, +3 GD; Portugal 2 Pts, –1 GD; Denmark 2 Pts, –2 GD)	Fifth place game
4	Portugal	5	2	0	3	123	133	−10	4	Seventh place game
5	Denmark	5	2	0	3	126	134	−8	4	Ninth place game
6	Iceland	5	0	0	5	121	137	−16	0	Eleventh place game

Source: EHF
Rules for classification: 1) points; 2) head-to-head points; 3) head-to-head goal difference; 4) head-to-head number of goals scored; 5) goal difference.
Notes:

21 January 2000; 17:00	**Sweden**	**31–23**	**Iceland**	Dvorana Mladosti, Rijeka; Attendance: 1,200; Referees: Klúcsó, Lekrinszki (HUN)
21 January 2000; 17:00	Lövgren 7	(18–10)	Bjarnason 5	Dvorana Mladosti, Rijeka; Attendance: 1,200; Referees: Klúcsó, Lekrinszki (HUN)
21 January 2000; 17:00	3× (yellow card) 4× (suspension)	Report	3× (yellow card) 8× (suspension)	Dvorana Mladosti, Rijeka; Attendance: 1,200; Referees: Klúcsó, Lekrinszki (HUN)

21 January 2000; 19:00	**Portugal**	**28–27**	**Slovenia**	Dvorana Mladosti, Rijeka; Attendance: 2,000; Referees: Bülow, Lübker (GER)
21 January 2000; 19:00	Coelho 6	(12–12)	Lubej 8	Dvorana Mladosti, Rijeka; Attendance: 2,000; Referees: Bülow, Lübker (GER)
21 January 2000; 19:00	3× (yellow card) 7× (suspension) 1× (red card)	Report	3× (yellow card) 2× (suspension)	Dvorana Mladosti, Rijeka; Attendance: 2,000; Referees: Bülow, Lübker (GER)

21 January 2000; 21:00	**Russia**	**27–26**	**Denmark**	Dvorana Mladosti, Rijeka; Attendance: 1,000; Referees: Gallego, Lamas (ESP)
21 January 2000; 21:00	three players 5	(11–14)	Jacobsen 6	Dvorana Mladosti, Rijeka; Attendance: 1,000; Referees: Gallego, Lamas (ESP)
21 January 2000; 21:00	3× (yellow card) 2× (suspension)	Report	3× (yellow card) 3× (suspension)	Dvorana Mladosti, Rijeka; Attendance: 1,000; Referees: Gallego, Lamas (ESP)

22 January 2000; 17:00	**Slovenia**	**23–27**	**Russia**	Dvorana Mladosti, Rijeka; Attendance: 2,500; Referees: Garcia, Moreno (FRA)
22 January 2000; 17:00	Pajovič 10	(12–16)	Koksharov 7	Dvorana Mladosti, Rijeka; Attendance: 2,500; Referees: Garcia, Moreno (FRA)
22 January 2000; 17:00	3× (yellow card) 4× (suspension)	Report	3× (yellow card) 5× (suspension)	Dvorana Mladosti, Rijeka; Attendance: 2,500; Referees: Garcia, Moreno (FRA)

22 January 2000; 19:00	**Iceland**	**25–28**	**Portugal**	Dvorana Mladosti, Rijeka; Attendance: 1,200; Referees: Gallego, Lamas (ESP)
22 January 2000; 19:00	Grímsson 9	(13–14)	Resende 10	Dvorana Mladosti, Rijeka; Attendance: 1,200; Referees: Gallego, Lamas (ESP)
22 January 2000; 19:00	3× (yellow card) 7× (suspension) 1× (red card)	Report	3× (yellow card) 4× (suspension)	Dvorana Mladosti, Rijeka; Attendance: 1,200; Referees: Gallego, Lamas (ESP)

22 January 2000; 21:00	**Denmark**	**22–29**	**Sweden**	Dvorana Mladosti, Rijeka; Attendance: 1,200; Referees: Bülow, Lübker (GER)
22 January 2000; 21:00	Christiansen, Jeppesen 5	(10–16)	Lövgren 10	Dvorana Mladosti, Rijeka; Attendance: 1,200; Referees: Bülow, Lübker (GER)
22 January 2000; 21:00	3× (yellow card) 5× (suspension)	Report	3× (yellow card) 3× (suspension)	Dvorana Mladosti, Rijeka; Attendance: 1,200; Referees: Bülow, Lübker (GER)

23 January 2000; 17:00	**Sweden**	**29–21**	**Portugal**	Dvorana Mladosti, Rijeka; Attendance: 1,500; Referees: Migas, Bavas (GRE)
23 January 2000; 17:00	Petersson 7	(15–9)	Resende 6	Dvorana Mladosti, Rijeka; Attendance: 1,500; Referees: Migas, Bavas (GRE)
23 January 2000; 17:00	3× (yellow card) 2× (suspension)	Report	4× (yellow card) 5× (suspension) 1× (red card)	Dvorana Mladosti, Rijeka; Attendance: 1,500; Referees: Migas, Bavas (GRE)

23 January 2000; 19:00	**Russia**	**25–23**	**Iceland**	Dvorana Mladosti, Rijeka; Attendance: 1,200; Referees: Pendić, Majstorović (FRY)
23 January 2000; 19:00	Filippov 6	(15–14)	Grímsson 6	Dvorana Mladosti, Rijeka; Attendance: 1,200; Referees: Pendić, Majstorović (FRY)
23 January 2000; 19:00	3× (yellow card) 3× (suspension)	Report	4× (yellow card) 3× (suspension)	Dvorana Mladosti, Rijeka; Attendance: 1,200; Referees: Pendić, Majstorović (FRY)

23 January 2000; 21:00	**Denmark**	**24–28**	**Slovenia**	Dvorana Mladosti, Rijeka; Attendance: 2,000; Referees: Klúcsó, Lekrinszki (HUN)
23 January 2000; 21:00	Jacobsen 11	(9–13)	Šerbec 6	Dvorana Mladosti, Rijeka; Attendance: 2,000; Referees: Klúcsó, Lekrinszki (HUN)
23 January 2000; 21:00	3× (yellow card) 4× (suspension)	Report	2× (yellow card) 9× (suspension)	Dvorana Mladosti, Rijeka; Attendance: 2,000; Referees: Klúcsó, Lekrinszki (HUN)

25 January 2000; 17:00	**Sweden**	**26–24**	**Slovenia**	Dom Sportova, Zagreb; Attendance: 4,000; Referees: Gallego, Lamas (ESP)
25 January 2000; 17:00	Wislander 7	(11–12)	Pajovič 5	Dom Sportova, Zagreb; Attendance: 4,000; Referees: Gallego, Lamas (ESP)
25 January 2000; 17:00	3× (yellow card) 3× (suspension)	Report	3× (yellow card)	Dom Sportova, Zagreb; Attendance: 4,000; Referees: Gallego, Lamas (ESP)

25 January 2000; 19:00	**Portugal**	**20–24**	**Russia**	Dom Sportova, Zagreb; Referees: Nachevski, Nachevski (MKD)
25 January 2000; 19:00	Resende 8	(13–11)	Krivoshlykov, Kulinchenko 6	Dom Sportova, Zagreb; Referees: Nachevski, Nachevski (MKD)
25 January 2000; 19:00	3× (yellow card) 2× (suspension)	Report	3× (yellow card) 2× (suspension)	Dom Sportova, Zagreb; Referees: Nachevski, Nachevski (MKD)

25 January 2000; 21:00	**Iceland**	**24–26**	**Denmark**	Dom Sportova, Zagreb; Attendance: 800; Referees: Garcia, Moreno (FRA)
25 January 2000; 21:00	Grímsson 6	(14–13)	Bjerre 6	Dom Sportova, Zagreb; Attendance: 800; Referees: Garcia, Moreno (FRA)
25 January 2000; 21:00	3× (yellow card) 4× (suspension)	Report	3× (yellow card) 3× (suspension)	Dom Sportova, Zagreb; Attendance: 800; Referees: Garcia, Moreno (FRA)

27 January 2000; 17:00	**Slovenia**	**27–26**	**Iceland**	Dom Sportova, Zagreb; Attendance: 2,400; Referees: Litvinov, Khudoerko (RUS)
27 January 2000; 17:00	Kastelic, Šerbec 5	(17–12)	Grímsson 7	Dom Sportova, Zagreb; Attendance: 2,400; Referees: Litvinov, Khudoerko (RUS)
27 January 2000; 17:00	4× (yellow card) 3× (suspension)	Report	4× (yellow card) 4× (suspension)	Dom Sportova, Zagreb; Attendance: 2,400; Referees: Litvinov, Khudoerko (RUS)

27 January 2000; 19:00	**Russia**	**25–28**	**Sweden**	Dom Sportova, Zagreb; Attendance: 2,000; Referees: Garcia, Moreno (FRA)
27 January 2000; 19:00	Filippov 10	(15–14)	Wislander 7	Dom Sportova, Zagreb; Attendance: 2,000; Referees: Garcia, Moreno (FRA)
27 January 2000; 19:00	3× (yellow card) 3× (suspension)	Report	4× (yellow card) 2× (suspension)	Dom Sportova, Zagreb; Attendance: 2,000; Referees: Garcia, Moreno (FRA)

27 January 2000; 21:00	**Portugal**	**26–28**	**Denmark**	Dom Sportova, Zagreb; Attendance: 1,500; Referees: Nachevski, Nachevski (MKD)
27 January 2000; 21:00	Resende 9	(12–13)	Jacobsen 6	Dom Sportova, Zagreb; Attendance: 1,500; Referees: Nachevski, Nachevski (MKD)
27 January 2000; 21:00	3× (yellow card) 8× (suspension)	Report	4× (yellow card) 3× (suspension)	Dom Sportova, Zagreb; Attendance: 1,500; Referees: Nachevski, Nachevski (MKD)

== Placement matches ==
=== Eleventh place game ===
29 January 2000; 15:00	**Ukraine**	**25–26**	**Iceland**	Dvorana Mladosti, Rijeka; Attendance: 200; Referees: Pendić, Majstorović (FRY)
29 January 2000; 15:00	Velyky 11	(12–13)	Grímsson 9	Dvorana Mladosti, Rijeka; Attendance: 200; Referees: Pendić, Majstorović (FRY)
29 January 2000; 15:00	2× (yellow card) 3× (suspension)	Report	3× (yellow card) 4× (suspension)	Dvorana Mladosti, Rijeka; Attendance: 200; Referees: Pendić, Majstorović (FRY)

=== Ninth place game ===
29 January 2000; 17:30	**Germany**	**19–17**	**Denmark**	Dvorana Mladosti, Rijeka; Attendance: 350; Referees: Klúcsó, Lekrinszki (HUN)
29 January 2000; 17:30	Roos 6	(8–10)	Christiansen 6	Dvorana Mladosti, Rijeka; Attendance: 350; Referees: Klúcsó, Lekrinszki (HUN)
29 January 2000; 17:30	2× (yellow card) 7× (suspension) 1× (red card)	Report	3× (yellow card) 6× (suspension)	Dvorana Mladosti, Rijeka; Attendance: 350; Referees: Klúcsó, Lekrinszki (HUN)

=== Seventh place game ===
29 January 2000
20:00
Norway
**27–30** **(ET)**
Portugal
Dvorana Mladosti, Rijeka
Attendance: 100
Referees: Hansson, Olsson (SWE)
three players 5
(10–14)
Tchikoulaev 8
2× (yellow card) 4× (suspension)
Report
2× (yellow card) 6× (suspension)

FT: 23–23 ET: 4–7

=== Fifth place game ===
29 January 2000; 21:00	**Croatia**	**24–25**	**Slovenia**	Dom Sportova, Zagreb; Attendance: 10,000; Referees: Garcia, Moreno (FRA)
29 January 2000; 21:00	Smajlagić 7	(12–12)	three players 6	Dom Sportova, Zagreb; Attendance: 10,000; Referees: Garcia, Moreno (FRA)
29 January 2000; 21:00	3× (yellow card) 6× (suspension)	Report	3× (yellow card) 7× (suspension) 1× (red card)	Dom Sportova, Zagreb; Attendance: 10,000; Referees: Garcia, Moreno (FRA)

== Knockout stage ==
=== Bracket ===
Semifinals
29 January
France	23
**Russia**	**30**
29 January
**Sweden**	**23**
Spain	21

Final
30 January
Russia	31
**Sweden (ET)**	**32**
Third place
30 January
**Spain**	**24**
France	23

=== Semifinals ===
29 January 2000; 15:00	**France**	**23–30**	**Russia**	Dom Sportova, Zagreb; Attendance: 3,000; Referees: Nachevski, Nachevski (MKD)
29 January 2000; 15:00	Cazal 6	(10–16)	Koksharov 9	Dom Sportova, Zagreb; Attendance: 3,000; Referees: Nachevski, Nachevski (MKD)
29 January 2000; 15:00	4× (yellow card) 2× (suspension)	Report	3× (yellow card) 5× (suspension) 1× (red card)	Dom Sportova, Zagreb; Attendance: 3,000; Referees: Nachevski, Nachevski (MKD)

29 January 2000; 17:30	**Sweden**	**23–21**	**Spain**	Dom Sportova, Zagreb; Attendance: 7,500; Referees: Bülow, Lübker (GER)
29 January 2000; 17:30	Vranjes, Wislander 6	(11–12)	Ortega 5	Dom Sportova, Zagreb; Attendance: 7,500; Referees: Bülow, Lübker (GER)
29 January 2000; 17:30	3× (yellow card) 3× (suspension)	Report	4× (yellow card) 4× (suspension)	Dom Sportova, Zagreb; Attendance: 7,500; Referees: Bülow, Lübker (GER)

=== Third place game ===
30 January 2000; 15:00	**Spain**	**24–23**	**France**	Dom Sportova, Zagreb; Attendance: 4,000; Referees: Pendić, Majstorović (FRY)
30 January 2000; 15:00	Dujshebaev 7	(13–12)	Gille 6	Dom Sportova, Zagreb; Attendance: 4,000; Referees: Pendić, Majstorović (FRY)
30 January 2000; 15:00	2× (yellow card) 3× (suspension)	Report	3× (yellow card) 2× (suspension)	Dom Sportova, Zagreb; Attendance: 4,000; Referees: Pendić, Majstorović (FRY)

=== Final ===
30 January 2000
17:30
Russia
**31–32** **(ET)**
Sweden
Dom Sportova, Zagreb
Attendance: 7,500
Referees: Migas, Bavas (GRE)
Filippov 6
(15–9)
Wislander 10
3× (yellow card) 2× (suspension)
Report
3× (yellow card) 4× (suspension)

FT: 24–24 ET: 3–3, 4–5

== Ranking and statistics ==
=== Final ranking ===
Gold medal	Sweden
Silver medal	Russia
Bronze medal	Spain
4	France
5	Slovenia
6	Croatia
7	Portugal
8	Norway
9	Germany
10	Denmark
11	Iceland
12	Ukraine

**2000 Men's European Champions**

**Sweden**
**Third Title**

=== All-Star Team ===
Position	Player
Goalkeeper	Peter Gentzel (SWE)
Right wing	Irfan Smajlagić (CRO)
Right back	Patrick Cazal (FRA)
Centre back	Jackson Richardson (FRA)
Left back	Carlos Resende (POR)
Left wing	Rafael Guijosa (ESP)
Pivot	Andrei Xepkin (ESP)
Most valuable player	Jackson Richardson (FRA)

Source: EHF Archived 19 September 2020 at the Wayback Machine

=== Top goalscorers ===
Rank	Name	Team	Goals	Shots	%
1	Oleg Velyky	Ukraine	46	96	48
2	Valdimar Grímsson	Iceland	41	56	73
3	Patrick Cazal	France	40	82	49
3	Magnus Wislander	Sweden	40	54	74
5	Carlos Resende	Portugal	38	77	49
6	Stefan Lövgren	Sweden	33	54	61
7	Rafael Guijosa	Spain	32	49	65
7	Aleš Pajovič	Slovenia	32	63	51
9	Bertrand Gille	France	30	46	65
9	Jackson Richardson	France	30	48	62

Source: EHF Archived 6 November 2019 at the Wayback Machine

=== Top goalkeepers ===
(minimum 20% of total shots received by team)

Rank	Name	Team	%	Saves	Shots
1	Tomas Svensson	Sweden	43	52	122
2	David Barrufet	Spain	40	87	215
3	Henning Fritz	Germany	39	22	57
3	Peter Gentzel	Sweden	39	54	137
5	Venio Losert	Croatia	38	48	128
5	Bruno Martini	France	38	55	143
7	Mirko Bašić	Croatia	37	27	73
7	Jan Holpert	Germany	37	38	104
9	Kasper Hvidt	Denmark	35	44	124
9	Frode Scheie	Norway	35	38	108

Source: EHF Archived 6 November 2019 at the Wayback Machine

=== Shooting statistics ===
2003 research of Croatian kinesiologists on the efficiency of the shooting at the Championship summarized:

Almost half of all the shots performed (44.61%) were executed from the back-court players' positions (field shots). The winning teams were considerably more efficient in field shots and in 7m throws than the defeated ones - (43.20%) and (76.53%) as compared to (32.52%) and (65.76%), respectively. (...) The winning teams had more successful field shots, 6m-centre shots and wing shots, and fewer unsuccessful 6m-centre and field shots and 7m throws. Scoring efficiency from a distance and from the 6m line differentiates the successful teams (winners) from the unsuccessful (defeated) ones.

== Sources ==
- eurohandball.com. "2000 Men's European Championship". Archived from the original on 18 March 2017.
- todor66.com. "Men Handball European Championship 2000". Archived from the original on 19 June 2011.
- Vuleta, Dinko; Milanović, Dragan; Sertić, Hrvoje (2003). "Povezanost varijabli šutiranja na gol s konačnim rezultatom rukometnih utakmica Europskog prvenstvu 2000. godine za muškarce" [Relations among variables of shooting for a goal and outcomes of the 2000 men’s european handball championship matches]. Kinesiology. 35 (2): 168–173. ISSN 1848-638X.
