= Belone Moreira =

Portuguese handball player (born 1990)

Personal information
- Nationality: Portuguese
- Born: 1 June 1990 (age 36) Lisbon, Portugal
- Height: 1.80 m (5 ft 11 in)

Sport
- Sport: Handball
- Position: Right back
- Current club: Benfica
- Number: 11

Senior clubs
- Years: Team
- 2008–2013: Belenenses
- 2013–2015: Passos Manuel
- 2015–: Benfica
National team
Years	Team	Apps	(Gls)
2019–	Portugal	16	(21)

Belone Moreira (born 1 June 1990) is a Portuguese handball player for Benfica and the Portuguese national team.

He represented Portugal at the 2020 European Men's Handball Championship.

== Honours ==
Benfica

- EHF European League: 2021–22
