= Alexis Borges =

Portuguese handball player (born 1991)

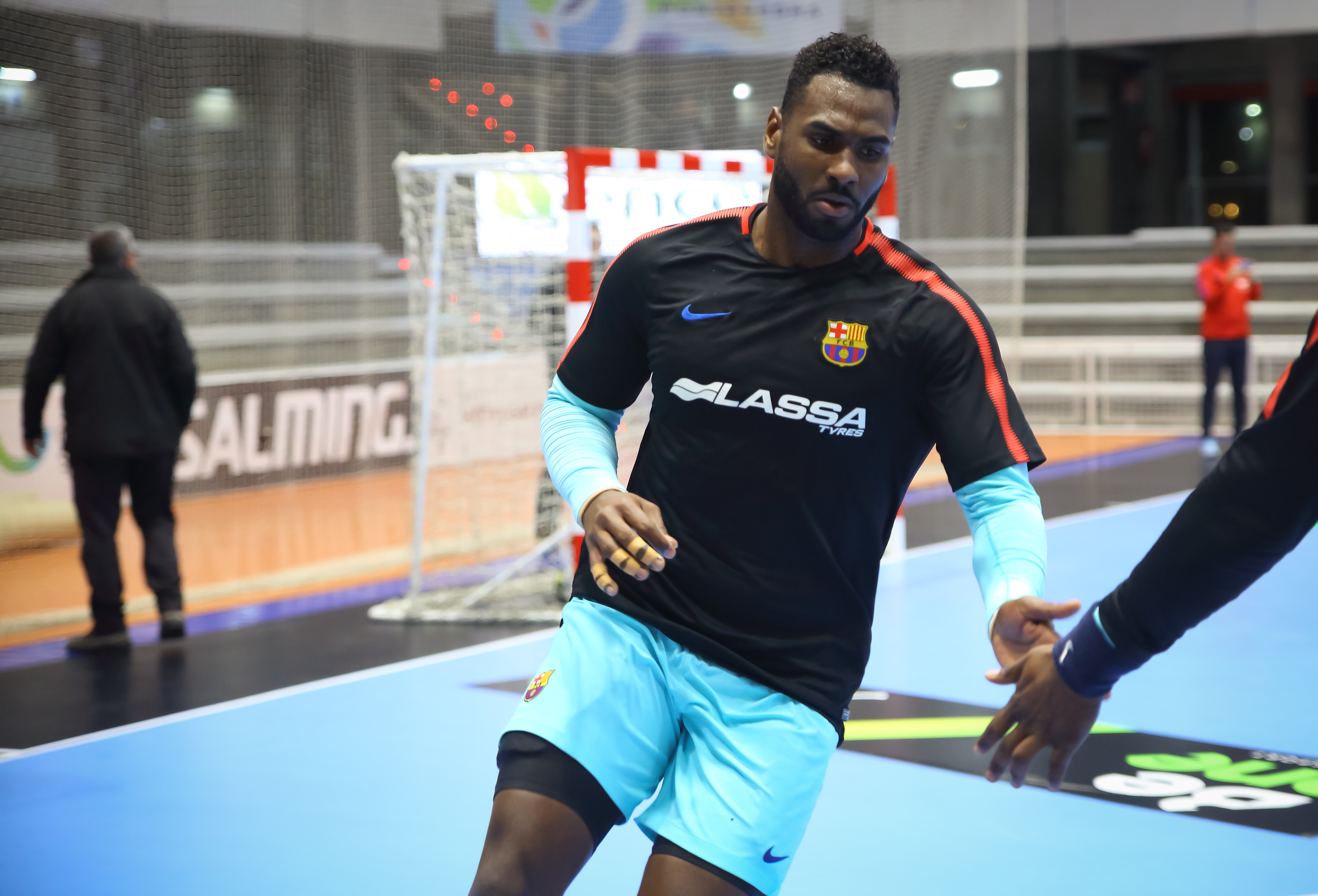

Personal information
- Full name: Alexis Hernández Borges
- Nationality: Portuguese
- Born: 6 October 1991 (age 35) Havana, Cuba
- Height: 1.96 m (6 ft 5 in)

Sport
- Sport: Handball
- Position: Pivot
- Current club: S.L. Benfica
- Number: 22

Senior clubs
- Years: Team
- 2013–2020: FC Porto
- 2017–2018: → FC Barcelona Lassa (loan)
- 2020–2021: Montpellier Handball
- 2021–: S.L. Benfica
National team
Years	Team	Apps	(Gls)
2017–	Portugal	64	(109)
- Updated on 18 August 2024

Alexis Hernandez Borges (Portuguese pronunciation: [aˈlɛksiʒ ˈβɔɾʒɨʃ]; born 6 October 1991) is a Portuguese handball player for S.L. Benfica and the Portuguese national team.

He represented Portugal at the 2020 European Men's Handball Championship.

== Honours ==
Porto

- Portuguese League: 2013–14, 2014–15, 2018–19
- Portuguese Cup: 2018–19
- Portuguese Super Cup: 2014, 2019

Barcelona

- Liga ASOBAL: 2017–18
- Copa del Rey: 2017–18
- Copa ASOBAL: 2017–18
- Supercopa ASOBAL: 2017
- IHF Super Globe: 2017

Benfica

- EHF European League: 2021–22

Portugal

- EHF Euro 2020 (sixth place)
