= Ole Rahmel =

German handball player (born 1989)

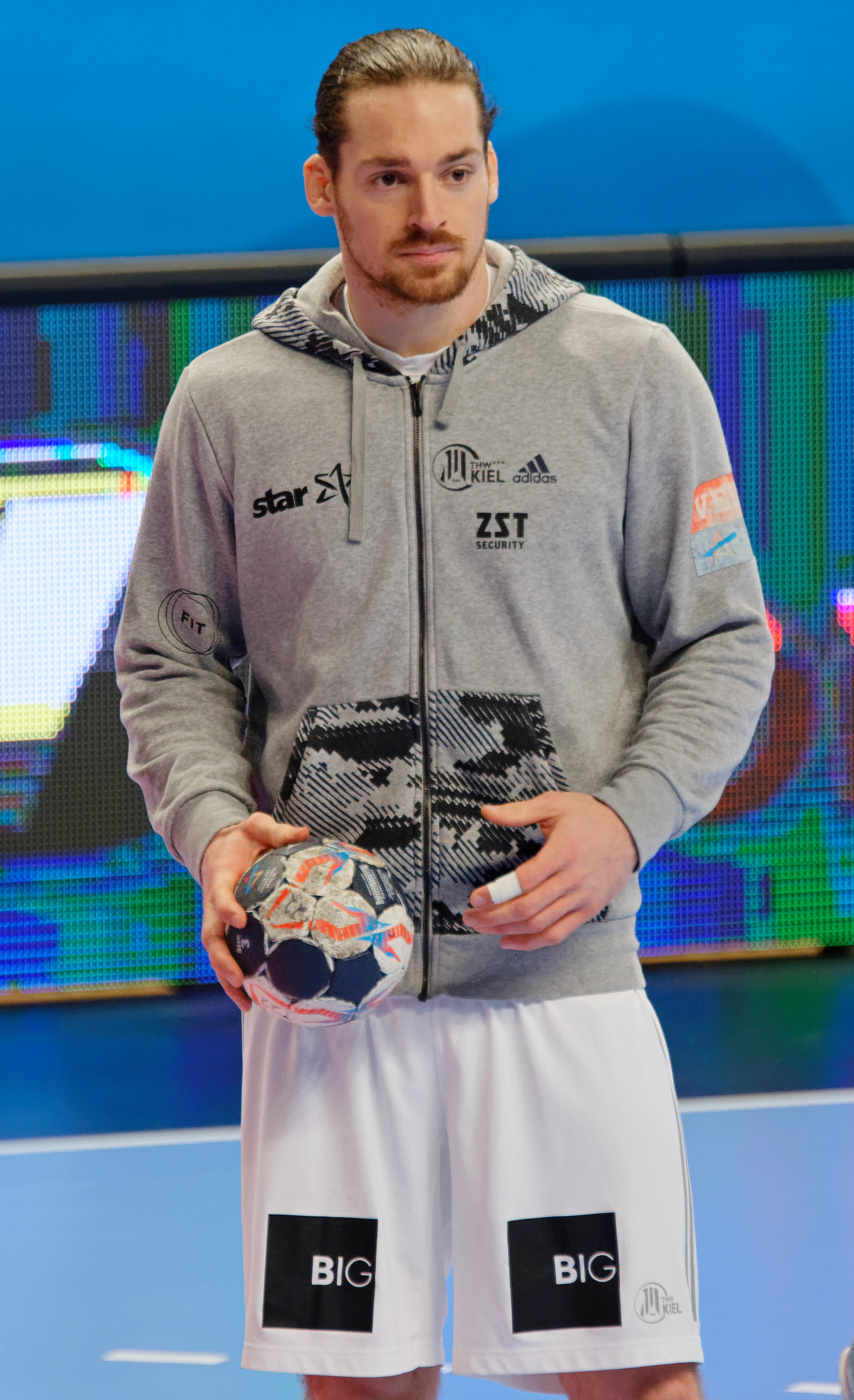

Personal information
- Nationality: German
- Born: 19 November 1989 (age 36) Achim, Germany
- Height: 1.90 m (6 ft 3 in)

Sport
- Sport: Handball
- Position: Right wing
- Current club: S.L. Benfica
- Number: 23

Senior clubs
- Years: Team
- 2007–2011: VfL Gummersbach
- 2011–2013: TUSEM Essen
- 2013–2017: HC Erlangen
- 2017–2020: THW Kiel
- 2020–2025: S.L. Benfica
National team
Years	Team	Apps	(Gls)
2015–2022	Germany	5	(10)
- Updated on 28 August 2025

Ole Rahmel (born 19 November 1989) is a German former handball player for SL Benfica and the German national team.

In 2025 he retired from playing and became the sporting director at HC Erlangen.

== Honours ==
Benfica

- EHF European League: 2021–22

Kiel

- EHF Champions League: 2020-21
