= Sergey Hernández =

Spanish handball player (born 1995)

Sergey Hernandez
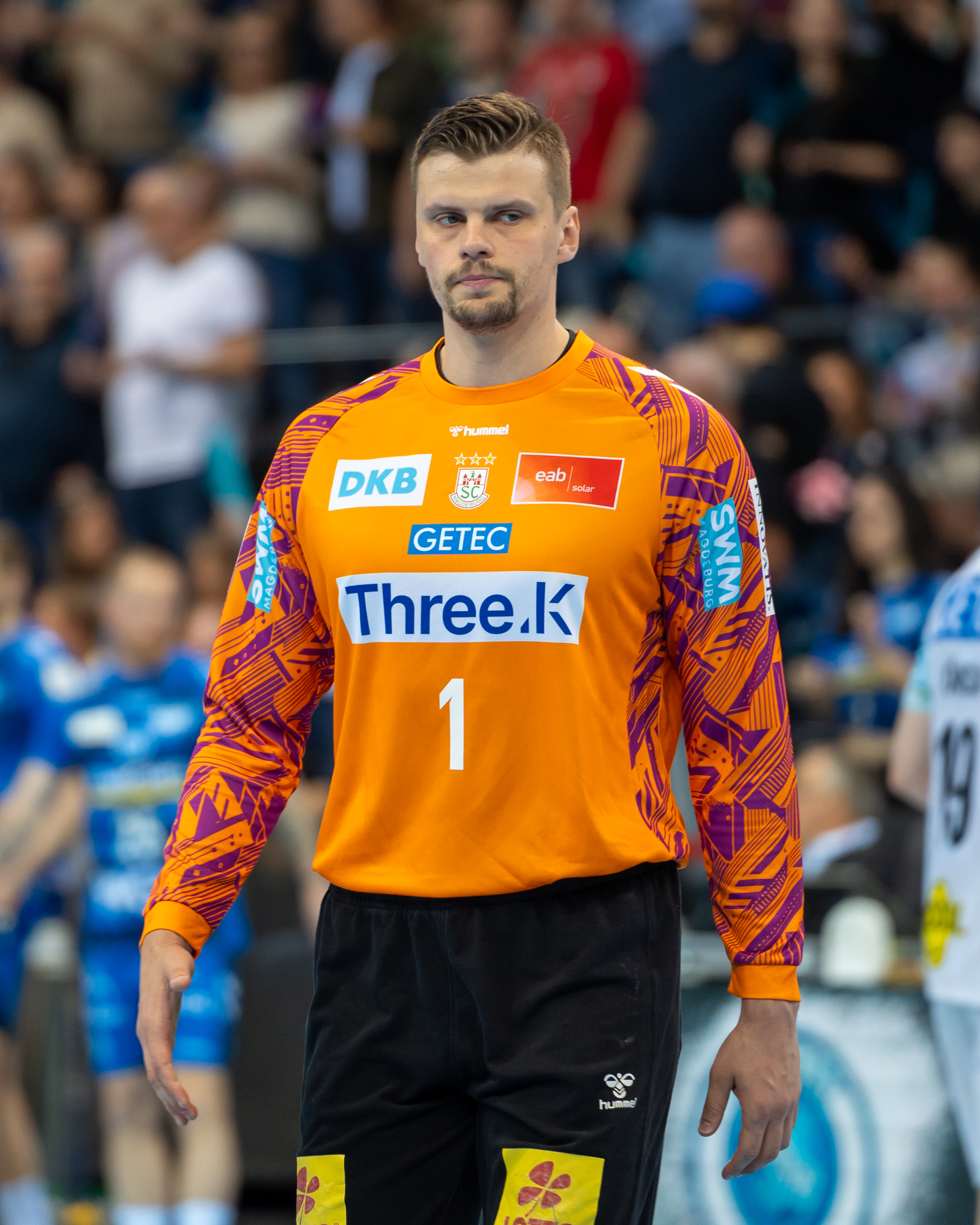

Personal information
- Nationality: Spanish
- Born: 17 June 1995 (age 31) Kropotkin, Russia
- Height: 1.98 m (6 ft 6 in)

Sport
- Sport: Handball
- Position: Goalkeeper
- Current club: SC Magdeburg
- Number: 1

Youth career
- Years: Team
- 2008–2013: KIF Kolding

Senior clubs
- Years: Team
- 2013–2018: BM Helvetia Anaitasuna
- 2018–2020: CB Ciudad de Logroño
- 2020–2023: S.L. Benfica
- 2023–2026: SC Magdeburg
- 2026–: FC Barcelona
National team
Years	Team	Apps	(Gls)
2017–	Spain	59	(11)
Medal record
World Championship
Bronze medal – third place	2021 Egypt
European Championship
Silver medal – second place	2022 Hungary/Slovakia
- Updated on 13 January 2025

Sergey Hernandez (born 17 June 1995) is a Russian-born Spanish handball player for SC Magdeburg and the Spanish national team.

He won a bronze medal with Spain at the 2021 World Men's Handball Championship and silver at the 2022 European Men's Handball Championship. At club-level, he was a key player when SL Benfica won the 2021–22 EHF European League, defeating SC Magdeburg in the final. He was later named MVP in the FINAL4. He joined Magdeburg in 2023. At the 2024 European Men's Handball Championship, he was part of the Spanish team's unsuccessful tournament, where they finished 13th.

In 2024/25 season of Handball Bundesliga he set the Handball Bundesliga record for most goals in a season by a goalkeeper with 10 goals, which he later improved upon. He also holds record for most career goals by a goalkeeper in Handball Bundesliga. And he jointly holds record for most goals by a goalkeeper in a Handball Bundesliga match with 3.
