= Carlos Carneiro =

Carlos Carneiro may refer to:

- Carlos Carneiro (footballer) (born 1975), Portuguese retired footballer
- Carlos Carneiro (handballer) (born 1982), Portuguese handballer
- Carlos Carneiro (cyclist) (born 1970), Portuguese road cyclist
