= Carlos Carneiro (handballer) =

Portuguese handball player (born 1982)

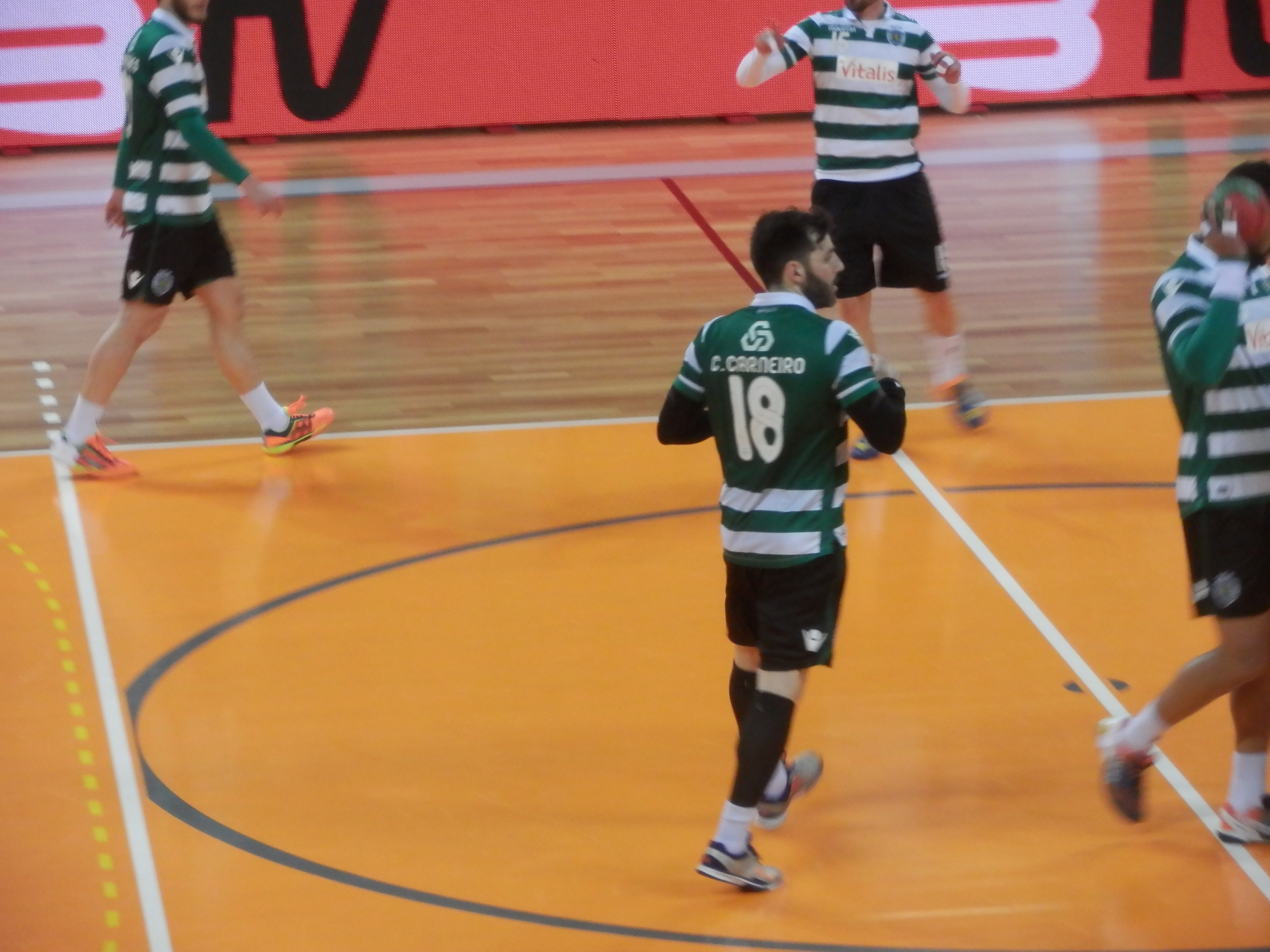
- Carneiro with Sporting in 2016

Personal information
- Full name: Carlos Hugo Freitas Carneiro
- Nationality: Portuguese
- Born: 3 March 1982 (age 44) Guimarães, Portugal
- Height: 1.83 m (6 ft 0 in)

Sport
- Sport: Handball
- Position: Centre back

Youth career
- Years: Team
- 1997: Vitória de Guimarães
- 1998–2000: Francisco de Holanda
- 2000–2003: ABC Braga

Senior clubs
- Years: Team
- 2002–2003: ABC Braga
- 2003–2004: → Boavista FC (loan)
- 2004–2007: Madeira Andebol SAD
- 2007–2015: Benfica
- 2015–2020: Sporting CP
National team
Years	Team	Apps
2003–2020	Portugal	93

Carlos Hugo Freitas Carneiro (born 3 March 1982) is a former Portuguese handballer.

== Career ==
Born in Guimarães, Carneiro started his youth career in his hometown club, Vitória S.C. at age 15, he then spent a two-year span at Xico Andebol, before joining ABC Braga and start a professional career at age 18, and debuting for the national team, only a year later.

In 2004, he moved to Madeira Andebol SAD and won the league in his first season, and finished runner-up in the second. His performances led to a move to Benfica after two seasons in Madeira.

In his first year in Lisbon, Carneiro helped the team conquer their first national title in 18 years, plus, he added a League Cup in the following season. His best individual seasons came in 2010–11 and in 2012–13, when he was elected Most Valuable Player of the Liga Portuguesa de Andebol, while also adding three titles in other competitions.

On 5 June 2015, Benfica announced the departure of Carneiro after eight seasons defending Benfica, with the 33-year-old joining cross-town rivals, Sporting, shortly after. In his first season at Sporting, he helped the club win their second EHF Challenge Cup and the first league title in 16 years. A year later, he won back-to-back league titles with them.

== Honours ==
Madeira Andebol SAD

- Liga Portuguesa de Andebol: 2004–05

SL Benfica

- Liga Portuguesa de Andebol: 2007–08
- Portuguese Handball Cup: 2010–11
- Portuguese Handball Super Cup: 2011, 2013
- Portuguese Handball League Cup: 2008–09

Sporting CP

- Liga Portuguesa de Andebol: 2016–17, 2017–18
- EHF Challenge Cup: 2016–17
