= Gustavo Capdeville =

Portuguese handball player (born 1997)

Personal information
- Full name: Gustavo Alexandre Cascão Capdeville
- Nationality: Portuguese
- Born: 31 August 1997 (age 29) Lisbon, Portugal
- Height: 1.89 m (6 ft 2 in)

Sport
- Sport: Handball
- Position: Goalkeeper
- Current club: Benfica
- Number: 41

Senior clubs
- Years: Team
- 2013–: Benfica
- 2017–2019: → Madeira SAD (loan)
National team
Years	Team	Apps	(Gls)
2020–	Portugal	71	(0)
- Updated on 14 January 2026

Gustavo Alexandre Cascão Capdeville (born 31 August 1997) is a Portuguese handball player for Benfica and the Portugal national team.

He represented Portugal at the 2020 European Men's Handball Championship. In 2025 he was part of the Portugal team that reached the semifinals of the World Championship for the first time in history. They lost the semifinals to Denmark and the third place playoff to France. At the 2026 European Men's Handball Championship he was part of the Portugal team that got 5th place, their best ever finish at a European Championship.

== Honours ==
Benfica

- EHF European League: 2021–22
