= Petar Đorđić =

Serbian handball player (born 1990)

Petar Đorđić Петар Ђорђић
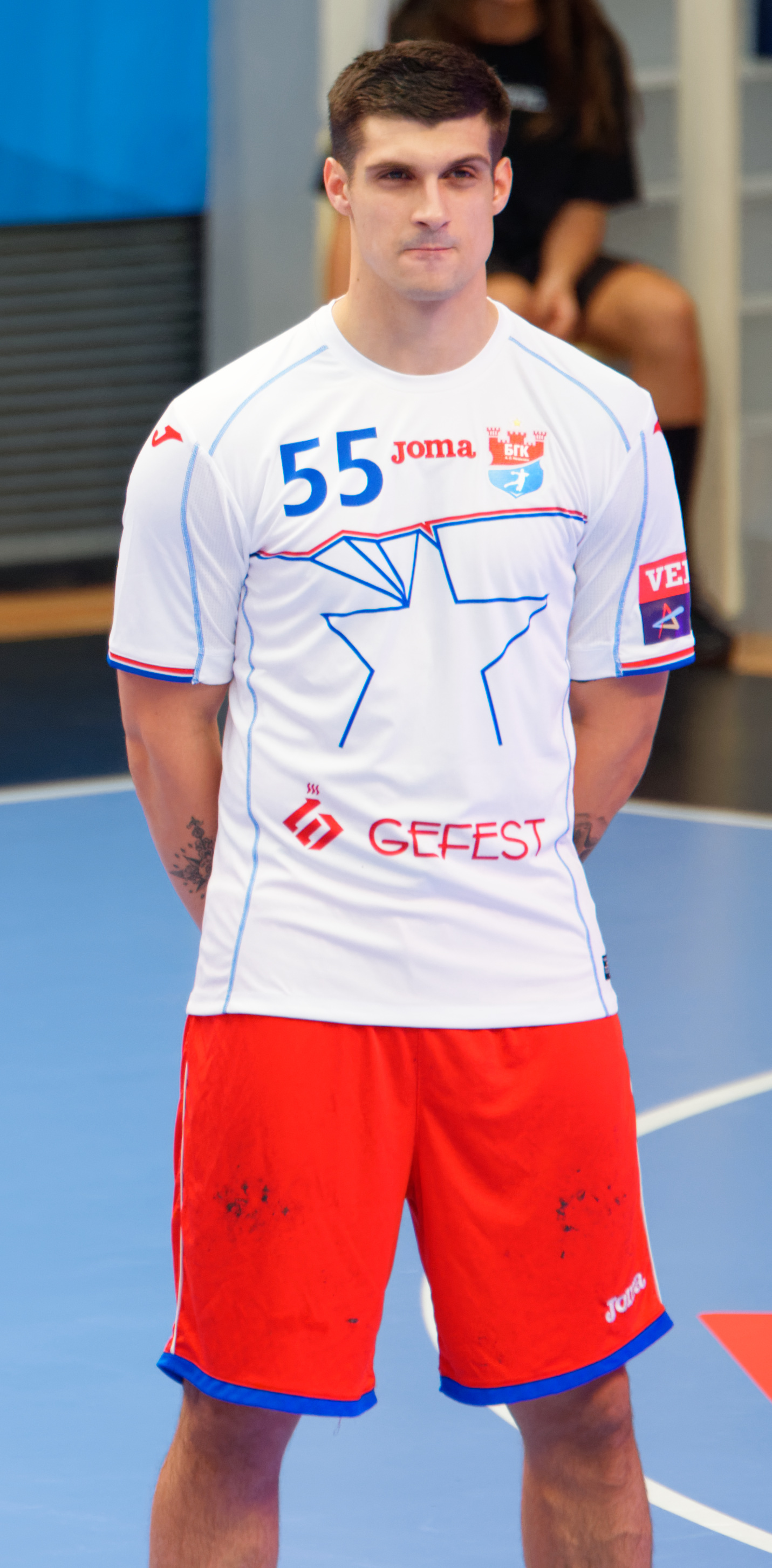
- Đorđić with HSV in 2014

Personal information
- Nationality: Serbian
- Born: 17 September 1990 (age 36) Šabac, SR Serbia, SFR Yugoslavia
- Height: 1.97 m (6 ft 6 in)

Sport
- Sport: Handball
- Position: Left back

Youth career
- Years: Team
- –2006: Wallau-Massenheim
- 2006–2008: Kirchzell

Senior clubs
- Years: Team
- 2008–2010: Wetzlar
- 2010–2013: Flensburg-Handewitt
- 2013–2015: Hamburg
- 2015–2017: Flensburg-Handewitt
- 2017–2019: Meshkov Brest
- 2019–2023: Benfica
- 2023–2024: Vojvodina
- 2024–2025: Partizan
National team
Years	Team	Apps	(Gls)
–2024	Serbia	45	(128)
Medal record
Mediterranean Games
Gold medal – first place	2009 Pescara	Team
- Updated on 23 October 2024

Petar Đorđić (Serbian: Петар Ђорђић; born 17 September 1990) is a former Serbian handball player.

His father, Zoran, is a former handball player who played for national team.

== Honours ==
SG Flensburg-Handewitt

- EHF Cup Winners' Cup: 2011–12

HC Meshkov Brest

- Belarusian Championship: 2017–18, 2018–19
- Belarusian Cup: 2017–18

S.L. Benfica

- EHF European League: 2021–22
- Portuguese Super Cup: 2022

RK Vojvodina

- Serbian Championship: 2023–24
- Serbian Super Cup : 2024

RK Partizan

- Serbian Championship: 2024–25

=== Individual ===
- EHF European League top scorer: 2021–22
