= Aleksander Donner =

Ukrainian handball coach

Personal information
- Born: 30 December 1948; Lviv, Ukraine
- Died: 24 August 2013 (aged 64); Funchal, Portugal

Aleksander Donner (Ukrainian: Олександр Доннер, first name also transliterated as Oleksandar, Oleksander or Oleksandr; 30 December 1948 – 24 August 2013) was a Ukrainian handball coach, best known for his spell at Portuguese team ABC Braga (1991–2004). Donner is considered the most accomplished coach in Portuguese handball and is credited with the success of growing the nation's handball in the 1990s.

== Career ==
Donner's career started in the 1980s when, as a player in Lviv's "CKA" and Astrakhan's "Zari," he helped Vladimir Gladchencko build famed Astrakhan's "Dinamo". Before signing for ABC Braga in Portugal, Donner was the assistant coach of the Russia national team, whose main coach at the time, Vlatschenko, recommended him to the board of directors of the Portuguese team. Donner left Russia for Portugal in 1992.

At ABC Braga, Donner won 8 league titles, 7 Portuguese Cups, 5 Super Cups and 1 Portuguese League Opening Cup. Under his guidance, in 1993–94, ABC Braga reached the final of EHF Champions League but lost to Spanish team Teka Cantabria. From 1996 to 2000, Donner coached the Portugal national team. After leaving ABC Braga, he coached another Portuguese league teams, such as Madeira Andebol SAD and Benfica. Overall, teams coached by Donner gained eleven championship titles.

== Death ==
Donner died of a heart attack on 24 August 2013, in Funchal, at the age of 65.
