= Leonel Fernandes =

Portuguese handball player (born 1998)

Personal information
- Full name: Leonel Gomes Silva Fernandes
- Born: 12 March 1998 (age 28) Vila Real, Portugal
- Height: 1.91 m (6 ft 3 in)

Sport
- Sport: Handball
- Position: Left wing
- Current club: Porto
- Number: 21

Youth career
- Years: Team
- 2008–2013: ADA Maia
- 2019–2020: Porto

Senior clubs
- Years: Team
- 2014–: Porto
- 2016–2018: → ADA Maia (loan)
National team
Years	Team	Apps	(Gls)
–	Portugal	69	(121)
- Updated on 14 January 2026

Leonel Gomes Silva Fernandes (born 12 March 1998) is a Portuguese handball player.

== Career ==
He started playing handball at ADA Maia, and in 2013 he joined the youth department of Porto. From 2016 to 2018 he was loaned back to ADA Maia.

From 2018 he played for Porto's first team, where he won the Portuguese Championship in 2019, 2021, 2022 and 2023. He also won the Cup in 2019 and 2021.

== National team ==
He represented Portugal at the 2018 Mediterranean Games, at the 2021 World Men's Handball Championship and at the 2022 European Men's Handball Championship.

At the 2023 World Men's Handball Championship he represented Portugal again, where they finished 13th. In 2025 he was part of the Portugal team that reached the semifinals of the World Championship for the first time in history. They lost the semifinals to Denmark and the third place playoff to France. At the 2026 European Men's Handball Championship he was part of the Portugal team that got 5th place, their best ever finish at a European Championship.
