= Ricardo Andorinho =

Portuguese handball player (born 1976)

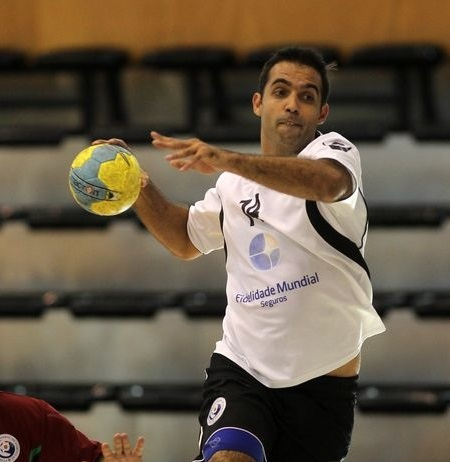

Personal information
- Full name: Ricardo José da Costa Andorinho
- Nationality: Portuguese
- Born: 14 November 1976 (age 49) Évora, Portugal
- Height: 1.86 m (6 ft 1 in)

Sport
- Sport: Handball
- Position: Left wing

Senior clubs
- Years: Team
- –1994: Évora Andebol Club
- 1994–2004: Sporting CP
- 2004–2008: SDC San Antonio
National team
Years	Team	Apps	(Gls)
1994-2008	Portugal	155	(528)

Ricardo José da Costa Andorinho (born 14 November 1976) is a Portuguese former handball player.

== Biography ==
One of the best Portuguese players of his generation, Andorinho played for Sporting CP, from 1994 to 2004. He then moved to SDC San Antonio, in Spain, where he played the rest of his career. In 2004, Andorinho suffered a budgetary restructuring which led him to move to San Antonio of Spain where he played until 2008. Due to a serious injury, he finished his career at the age of 31.

Andorinho made 155 caps for Portugal, scoring a record of 528 goals.

=== European Competitions ===
Champions League: Portland San António

- 2004/05 - Eighth-finals 8 games - 32 goals
- 2005/06 - Finalist defeated 6 Matches - 20 Goals
- 2006/07 - Eighth-finals 9 Matches - 28 Goals

=== National Selection ===
He played at the World Men's Handball Championship, in 1997, 2001 and 2003.
