= Carlos Resende =

Portuguese handball player and coach (born 1971)

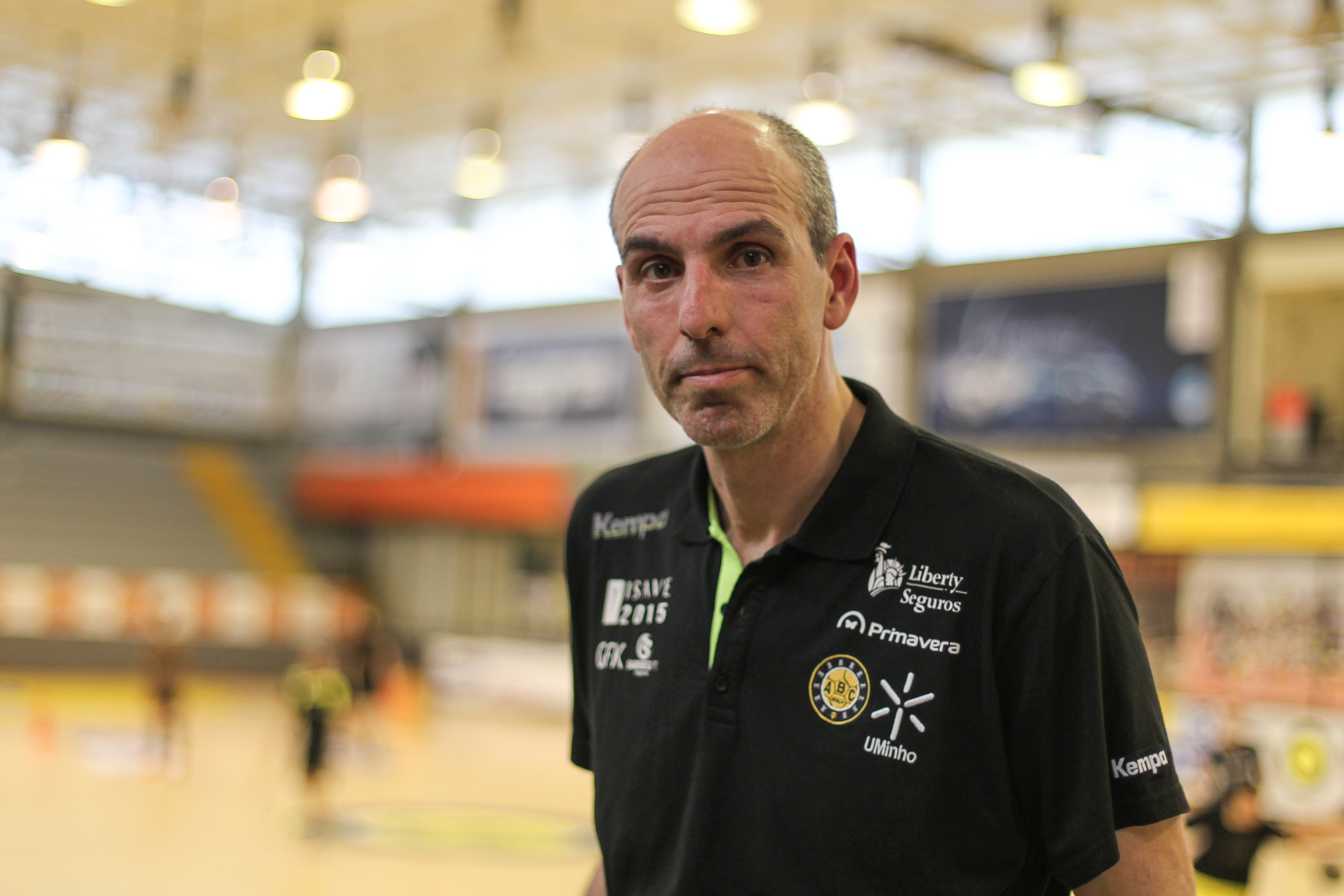
- Portuguese former handball player and coach

Personal information
- Nationality: Portuguese
- Born: 29 May 1971 (age 55) Lisbon, Portugal

Sport
- Sport: Handball
- Position: Left back
- Current club: FC Porto (head coach)

Youth career
- Years: Team
- 1979–1983: Ateneu
- 1983–1988: Sporting CP

Senior clubs
- Years: Team
- 1988–1994: Porto
- 1994–2000: ABC Braga
- 2000–2006: Porto
National team
Years	Team	Apps	(Gls)
1992–2006	Portugal	250	(1444)

Teams managed
- 2006–2009: Porto
- 2011–2017: ABC Braga
- 2017–2020: Benfica
- 2023–: FC Porto

Carlos Alberto da Rocha Resende (born 29 May 1971) is a Portuguese former handball player and current coach of FC Porto.

He played most of his career at FC Porto, except for a period of five years when he represented ABC Braga. He started his coach career in 2006 at Porto, joining ABC Braga in 2011, where he stayed until 2017.

Resende is the most capped player of all-time for the Portugal national team, with 250 matches. He played three times at the World Men's Handball Championship, in 1997, 2001 and 2003.

== Honours ==
=== Player ===
- Portuguese League: 7
- Portuguese Cup: 5
- Portuguese League Cup: 3
- Portuguese Super Cup: 1

=== Individual ===
- EHF Champions League Top Scorer: 1995–96, 1996–97

=== Coach ===
- Portuguese League: 2008–09, 2015–16
- Portuguese Cup: 2006–07, 2014–15, 2016–17, 2017–18
- Portuguese League Cup: 2007–08
- Portuguese Super Cup: 2015, 2018
- EHF Challenge Cup: 2015–16

=== Distinction ===
- Sports Merit Medal

== See also ==
- List of men's handballers with 1000 or more international goals
