= Jan Holpert =

German handball player (born 1968)

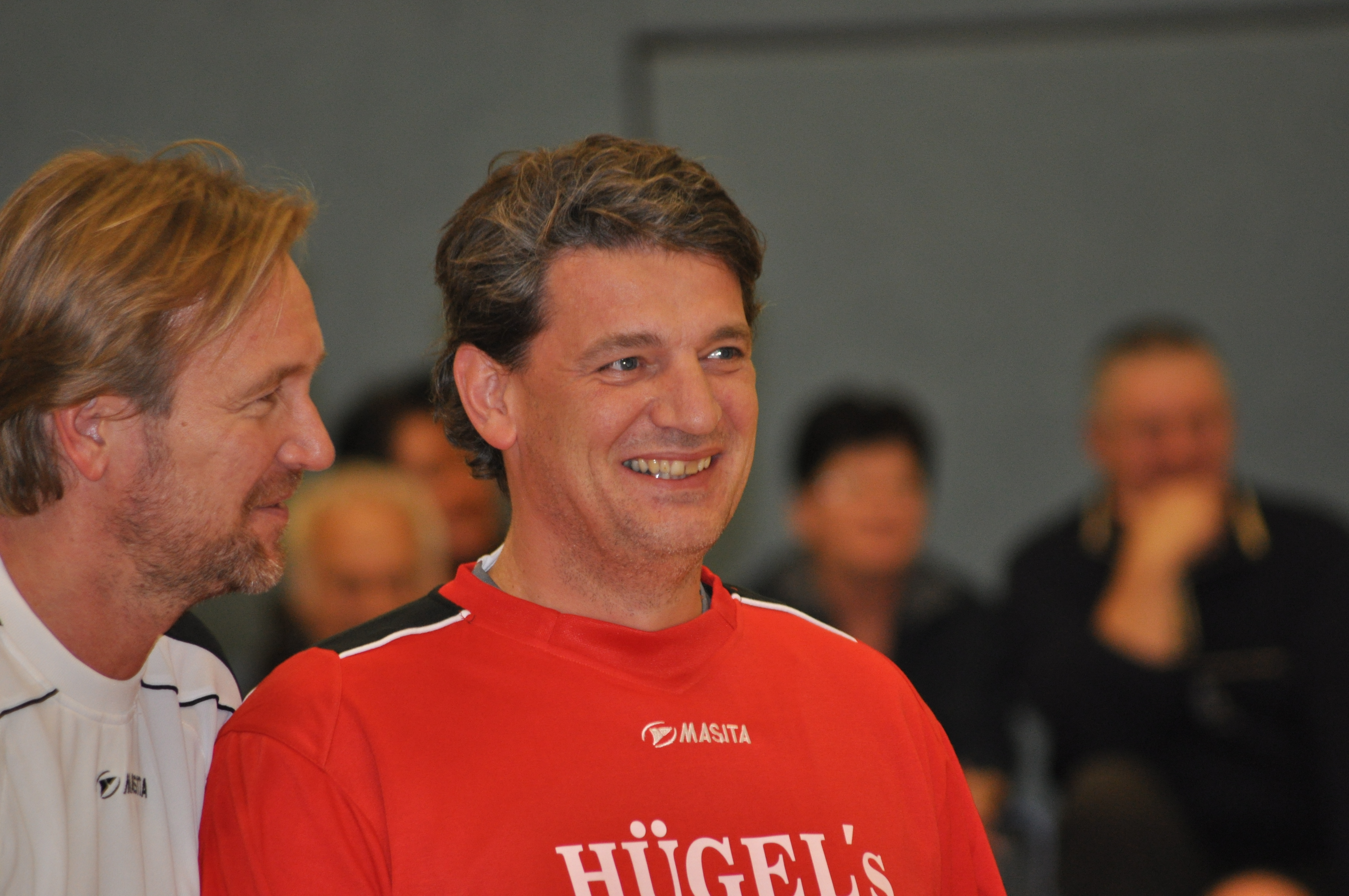
- Jan Holpert in 2010

Personal information
- Nationality: German
- Born: 4 May 1968 (age 56); Flensburg, West Germany

Sport
- Sport: Handball

Jan Holpert (born 4 May 1968) is a German former handball player. He competed at the 1992 Summer Olympics, the 1996 Summer Olympics and the 2000 Summer Olympics.
