= Oleg Velyky =

Ukrainian and German handball player (1977–2010)

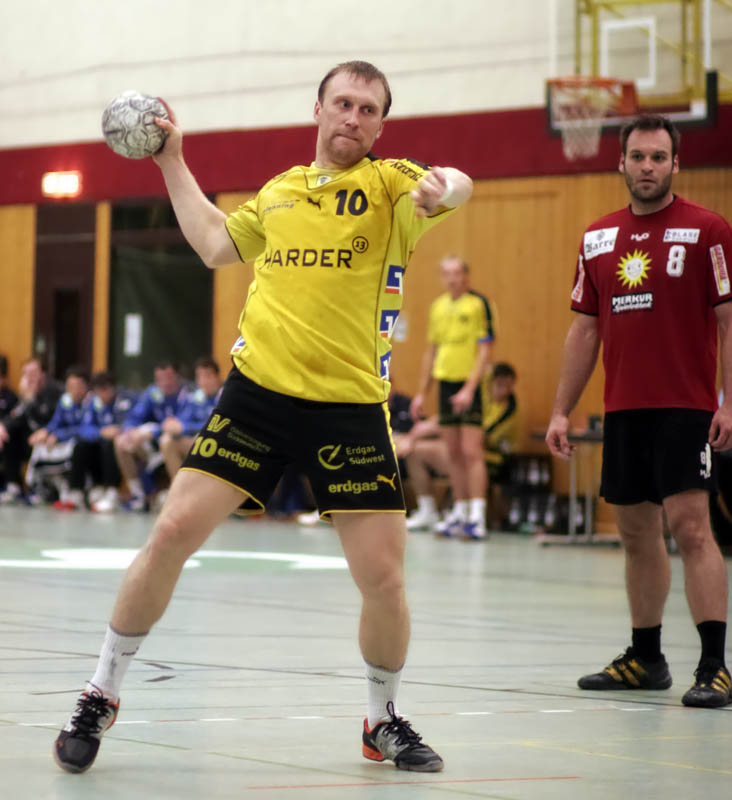
- 28 November 2006

Personal information
- Nationality: Ukrainian and German
- Born: 14 October 1977 Brovary, Ukraine
- Died: 23 January 2010 (aged 32)
- Height: 189 cm (74 in)

Sport
- Sport: Handball
- Position: Center back / left back

Senior clubs
- Years: Team
- -2001: HC ZTR Zaporizhzhia
- 2001-2005: TUSEM Essen
- 2005-2010: Rhein-Neckar Löwen
- 2008-2010: HSV Hamburg
National team
Years	Team	Apps	
–	Ukraine	59	
2005-2010	Germany	38	(123)
Medal record
Representing Germany
Men's handball
World championship
Gold medal – first place	2007 Germany	Team competition

Oleg Velyky (Ukrainian: Олег Великий, Oleh Welykyj; 14 October 1977 – 23 January 2010) was a Ukrainian and German handball player. He was a World champion 2007 with the German national team; he was on the team roster, but did not play because of an injury.

Velyky was born in Brovary, Ukraine. He became a German citizen in April 2004. He participated on the German team which finished 4th at the 2008 European Men's Handball Championship.

== Club player ==
Velyky won the EHF Cup in 2005 with the club TUSEM Essen and played for the Rhein-Neckar Löwn and HSV Handball.

== Family ==
Velyky was married to Kataryna and had one son.

== Health ==
He ruptured his cruciate ligament twice, first in 2006 and again in 2008, and sprained his foot in 2007. His health problems limited his international career to the World Championships in 2005 and one game in the 2008 European Championships.

In September 2003, he was diagnosed with a melanoma; it was in remission until the disease returned in March 2008, and caused his death in Kyiv, aged 32, in January 2010.
