= Portugal men's national handball team =

Men's national handball team representing Portugal

Portugal

Information
- Association: Portuguese Handball Federation
- Coach: Paulo Pereira
- Assistant coach: Jorge Fidalgo
- Most caps: Carlos Resende (250)
- Most goals: Carlos Resende (1444)

Colours
1st	2nd

Results

Summer Olympics
- Appearances: 1 (First in 2020)
- Best result: 9th (2020)

World Championship
- Appearances: 6 (First in 1997)
- Best result: 4th (2025)

European Championship
- Appearances: 9 (First in 1994)
- Best result: 5th (2026)
- Last updated on 30 January 2026.

The Portugal men's national handball team is governed by the Portuguese Handball Federation and represents Portugal in international men's handball matches. They have appeared six times in the World Championship, reaching an all-time best fourth place in 2025, and nine times in the European Championship, with a fifth place in 2026 as their best result. The team participated for the first time in the Olympic handball tournament at the 2020 Summer Olympics in Tokyo, finishing in ninth place.

== Competitive record ==
Portugal has competed six times at the World Championship (1997, 2001, 2003, 2021, 2023, 2025) and eight times at the European Championship (1994, 2000, 2002, 2004, 2006, 2020, 2022, 2024). They qualified automatically for the final tournaments of the World Championship in 2003 and of the inaugural European Championship in 1994 as the host team. Their best results are a fourth place at the World Championship in 2025, and a 5th place at the European Championship in 2026.

Legend

- Champions Runners-up Third place Fourth place
- Red-colored border indicates that tournament was held on home soil.

=== Olympic Games ===
Year	Round	Position	GP	W	D	L	GS	GA
(Germany) 1936 Berlin	Did not qualify							
Not held from 1948 to 1968
(West Germany) 1972 Munich	Did not qualify							
(Canada) 1976 Montreal	Did not qualify							
(Soviet Union) 1980 Moscow	Did not qualify							
(United States) 1984 Los Angeles	Did not qualify							
(South Korea) 1988 Seoul	Did not qualify							
(Spain) 1992 Barcelona	Did not qualify							
(United States) 1996 Atlanta	Did not qualify							
(Australia) 2000 Sydney	Did not qualify							
(Greece) 2004 Athens	Did not qualify							
(China) 2008 Beijing	Did not qualify							
(United Kingdom) 2012 London	Did not qualify							
(Brazil) 2016 Rio de Janeiro	Did not qualify							
(Japan) 2020 Tokyo	Preliminary round	9	5	1	0	4	143	156
(France) 2024 Paris	Did not qualify							
(United States) 2028 Los Angeles	To be determined							
(Australia) 2032 Brisbane	To be determined							
Total	1/15	–	5	1	0	4	143	156

=== World Championship ===
World Championship record
Year	Round	Position	GP	W	D	L	GS	GA
(Nazi Germany) 1938	Did not qualify							
(Sweden) 1954	Did not qualify							
(East Germany) 1958	Did not qualify							
(West Germany) 1961	Did not qualify							
(Czechoslovakia) 1964	Did not qualify							
(Sweden) 1967	Did not qualify							
(France) 1970	Did not qualify							
(East Germany) 1974	Did not qualify							
(Denmark) 1978	Did not qualify							
(West Germany) 1982	Did not qualify							
(Switzerland) 1986	Did not qualify							
(Czechoslovakia) 1990	Did not qualify							
(Sweden) 1993	Did not qualify							
(Iceland) 1995	Did not qualify							
(Japan) 1997	Preliminary round	19	5	1	0	4	119	123
(Egypt) 1999	Did not qualify							
(France) 2001	Round of 16	16	6	2	0	4	140	145
(Portugal) 2003	Second round	12	7	4	0	3	219	182
(Tunisia) 2005	Did not qualify							
(Germany) 2007	Did not qualify							
(Croatia) 2009	Did not qualify							
(Sweden) 2011	Did not qualify							
(Spain) 2013	Did not qualify							
(Qatar) 2015	Did not qualify							
(France) 2017	Did not qualify							
(Denmark) / (Germany) 2019	Did not qualify							
(Egypt) 2021	Main round	10	6	4	0	2	168	152
(Poland) / (Sweden) 2023	Main round	13	6	3	1	2	178	157
(Croatia) / (Denmark) / (Norway) 2025	Semi-finals	4	9	6	1	2	301	274
(Germany) 2027	Qualified							
(France) / (Germany) 2029	To be determined							
(Denmark) / (Iceland) / (Norway) 2031	To be determined							
Total	7/32	–	39	20	2	17	1125	1033

=== European Championship ===
Year	Round	Position	GP	W	D	L	GS	GA
(Portugal) 1994	Preliminary round	12	6	0	0	6	117	154
(Spain) 1996	Did not qualify							
(Italy) 1998	Did not qualify							
(Croatia) 2000	Preliminary round	7	6	3	0	3	153	160
(Sweden) 2002	Second round	9	7	3	0	4	173	174
(Slovenia) 2004	Preliminary round	14	3	0	1	2	91	101
(Switzerland) 2006	Preliminary round	15	3	0	0	3	80	96
(Norway) 2008	Did not qualify							
(Austria) 2010	Did not qualify							
(Serbia) 2012	Did not qualify							
(Denmark) 2014	Did not qualify							
(Poland) 2016	Did not qualify							
(Croatia) 2018	Did not qualify							
(Austria) / (Norway) / (Sweden) 2020	5th/6th place match	6	8	4	0	4	228	220
(Hungary) / (Slovakia) 2022	Preliminary round	19	3	0	0	3	85	91
(Germany) 2024	Main round	7	7	4	1	2	224	223
(Denmark) / (Norway) / (Sweden) 2026	5th/6th place match	5	8	4	2	2	274	267
(Portugal) / (Spain) / (Switzerland) 2028	Qualified as co-host							
(Czech Republic) (Denmark) (Poland) 2030
(France) (Germany) 2032
Total	9/20	–	51	18	4	29	1425	1486

== Team ==
=== Current squad ===
Squad for the 2026 European Men's Handball Championship.

Head coach: Paulo Pereira

No.	Pos.	Name	Date of birth (age)	Height	App.	Goals	Club
8	P	Victor Iturriza	22 May 1990 (age 35)	1.93 m	62	214	Kuwait SC
9	CB	Filipe Graça Monteiro	26 April 2004 (age 21)	1.81 m	5	5	(Portugal) Sporting CP
13	LB	Salvador Salvador	29 July 2001 (age 24)	1.98 m	45	102	(Portugal) Sporting CP
14	CB	Rui Silva	28 April 1993 (age 32)	1.86 m	153	276	(Portugal) FC Porto
20	LB	Miguel José Soares Neves	31 October 2000 (age 25)	2.03 m	7	16	(France) Saint-Raphaël Var Handball
21	LW	Leonel Fernandes	12 March 1998 (age 27)	1.91 m	68	121	(Portugal) FC Porto
23	LW	Diogo Branquinho	25 July 1994 (age 31)	1.85 m	112	233	(Portugal) Sporting CP
25	RW	Antonio Areia	21 June 1990 (age 35)	1.90 m	115	344	(France) Tremblay Handball
26	RB	Francisco Costa	16 February 2005 (age 20)	1.90 m	44	157	(Portugal) Sporting CP
29	RW	José Luís Correia Ferreira	24 June 2005 (age 20)	1.83 m	5	5	(Portugal) FC Porto
41	GK	Gustavo Capdeville	31 August 1997 (age 28)	1.90 m	74	0	(Portugal) Benfica
66	RB	João Gomes	6 September 2002 (age 23)	1.78 m	20	48	(Germany) VfL Gummersbach
79	CB	Martim Costa	27 September 2002 (age 23)	1.88 m	42	177	(Portugal) Sporting CP
82	P	Luís Frade	11 September 1998 (age 27)	1.94 m	90	204	(Spain) FC Barcelona
86	P	Ricardo Brandão	28 April 2004 (age 21)	1.95 m	25	29	(Portugal) FC Porto
95	CB	Gabriel Cavalcanti	30 April 2004 (age 21)	1.97 m	9	16	(Portugal) Benfica
96	GK	Pedro Tonicher	16 January 2003 (age 23)	1.90 m	2	0	(Spain) BM Ciudad Encantada
99	GK	Diogo Valério	10 February 1999 (age 27)	1.94 m	14	0	(Greece) Olympiacos

=== Notable former coaches ===
- (Romania) Mircea Costache
- (Sweden) Mats Olsson
- (Ukraine) Aleksander Donner

=== Player statistics ===
Most appearances
Name	Matches	Position	Years
Carlos Resende	250	OB, CB	1992-2006
Carlos Galambas	216	P	1990–2011
Ricardo Martins da Costa	204	W	
Fábio Magalhães	181	OB	2006-
Ricardo Andorinho	155	W	1994−2008
Hugo Figueira	152	GK	
Tiago Rocha	136	P	
Carlos Carneiro	93	CB	2003-2020

Top Scorers
Name	Goals	Average	Position	Years
Carlos Resende	1444	5.78	OB, CB	1992-2006
Ricardo Andorinho	528	3.41	W	1994−2008
Ricardo Martins da Costa	453+		W	
Tiago Rocha	355		P	
Carlos Galambas	300+		P	1990–2011
