= Portuguese Handball League Cup =

Taça da Liga de Andebol
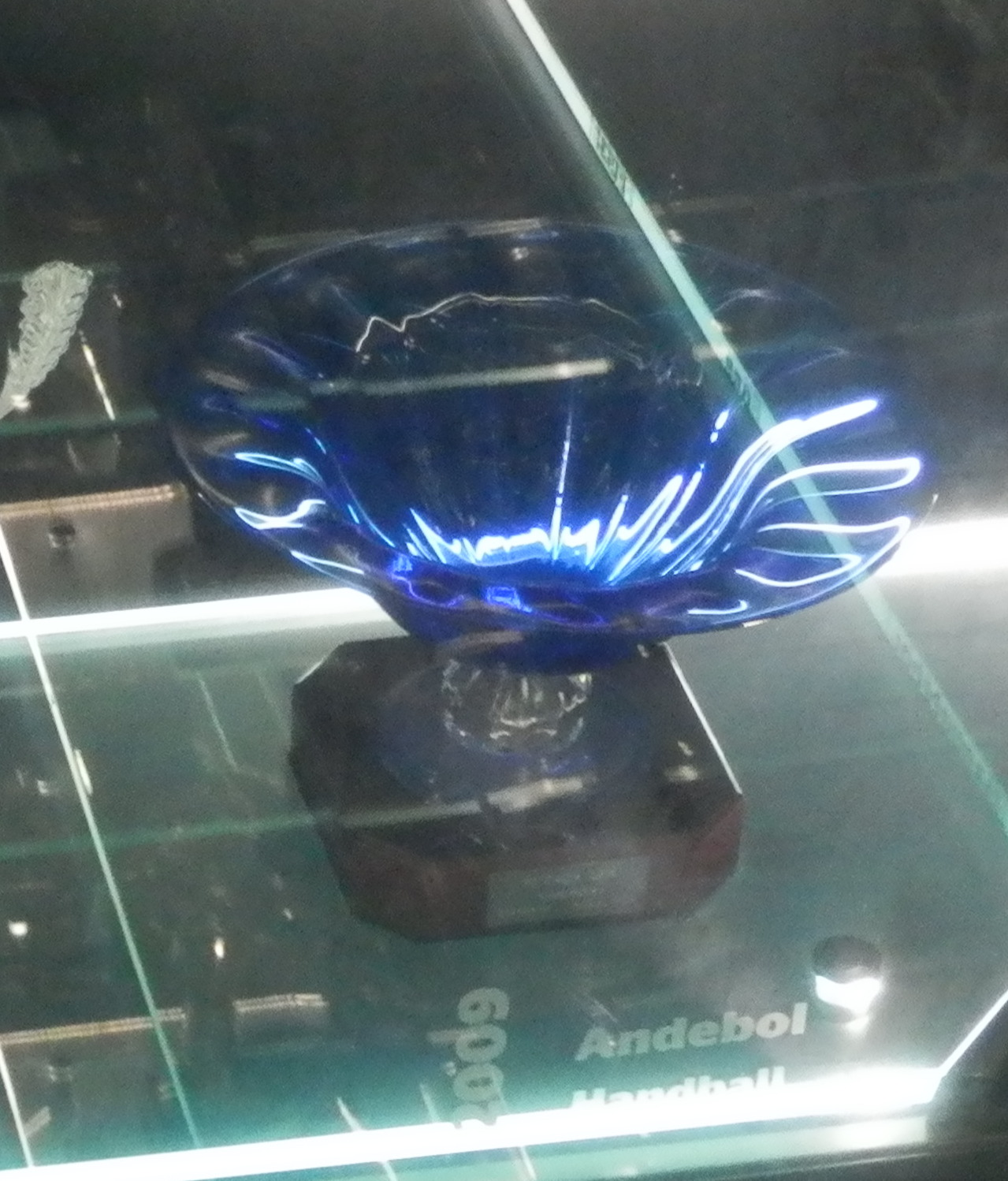
- The 2009 Handball League Cup trophy
- Founded: 2003
- Abolished: 2009
- Region: EHF
- Number of teams: 4
- Last champions: SL Benfica (2nd title)
- Most successful club(s): FC Porto (3 titles)

The Handball League Cup or Taça da Liga de Andebol was a handball competition disputed by the top clubs of the Liga Portuguesa de Andebol. Founded in 2003 by the Liga Portuguesa de Andebol (LPA), it ran for six years. The first two editions were won by FC Porto, followed by Belenenses and SL Benfica in 2006 and 2007. The final two editions were won by Porto and Benfica. Sporting has the most finals lost with three. In 2009, the LPA ended and the League Cup was replaced by Portuguese Handball Super Cup.

== History ==
The idea to create a second domestic cup after Portuguese Handball Cup came from the conflict between Portuguese Handball Federation and the Liga Portuguesa de Andebol (Portuguese Handball League) in 2002. The latter controlled the Divisão de Elite, a closed professional league, while the Federation controlled all others competitions. In 2003, LPA expanded their influence and created their own cup, the Taça da Liga (League Cup). The first edition was played in the weekend of 6 and 7 December 2003 in the Pavilhão Municipal de Grijó. Four clubs contested the tournament, FC Porto, ABC Braga, Águas Santas and Sporting. In the semi-finals, Sporting beat Águas Santas by 24–21, while Porto defeated ABC by 32–26. The following day, Carlos Resende scored 13 goals for Porto in a 31–28 win over Sporting. The second edition took place in the Nave Polivalente de Espinho, on 11 and 12 December 2004. Repeated contestants, Porto and ABC Braga were joined by two new one's, Belenenses and Sporting de Espinho. Porto reached their second consecutive final after defeating the home team by 30–25; while in the other game, ABC surpassed Belenenses by 34–27 to qualify for the first time. In the final, Porto beat ABC by 31–23 and added another trophy to its cabinet. The third edition was decided on 12 February 2006 at the Pavilhão Municipal de Idanha-a-Nova, where Belenenses defeated Maia team, Águas Santas by 25–24. The day before, Águas Santas had beat Porto, preventing them from reaching a three-peat.

For the subsequent editions, the tournament moved to the Portimão Arena. The first edition played there was in the weekend of 27 and 28 January 2007. In the semi-finals, new entrance Benfica beat arch-rivals Sporting by 27–23, while Águas Santas exacted revenge from their loss in the previous edition by defeating Belenenses by 26–24. On the final, Benfica aided by Georgi Zaikin, recovered from a three-goal deficit to beat Águas Santas by 33–23 and win their first title since the Supertaça in 1994. In the fifth edition, eight teams battled for the trophy; Águas Santas–Sporting de Espinho, Sporting–Benfica, ISAVE–Sporting da Horta, São Bernardo–Madeira SAD. After passing the quarter-finals, Sporting met ABC in the semis and beat them by 28–15. They would face Porto, who qualified for their third final, after overpowering São Bernardo by 26–17. On 2 March 2008, Porto defeated Sporting by 23–18 and claimed their third win in the competition, the second against the same opponent. In the sixth edition, the competition was played in a league format, with Benfica and Sporting qualifying for the final. On 18 January 2009, Benfica won the competition for a second time after defeating Sporting by 29–25 in Portimão. With the end of the Liga Portuguesa de Andebol in 2009, the competition ceased to exist. Its competitive space was taken over by the Portuguese Handball Super Cup, run by the Federation.

=== Winners ===
Year	Sports hall	Final		
Year	Sports hall	Winner	Score	Runner-up
2003–04	Municipal de Grijó	Porto	31–28 aet	Sporting
2004–05	Nave de Espinho	Porto	31–23	ABC Braga
2005–06	Municipal de Idanha-a-Nova	Belenenses	25–24 aet	Águas Santas
2006–07	Portimão Arena	Benfica	33–23	Águas Santas
2007–08	Portimão Arena	Porto	23–18	Sporting
2008–09	Portimão Arena	Benfica	29–25	Sporting

- Key:
  - aet - after extra time

=== Performance by club ===
Club	Winners	Runners-up	Years won	Years runner-up
Porto	3	0	2003–04, 2004–05, 2007–08	—
Benfica	2	0	2006–07, 2008–09	—
Belenenses	1	0	2005–06	—
Sporting	0	3	—	2003–04, 2007–08, 2008–09
Águas Santas	0	2	—	2005–06, 2006–07
ABC Braga	0	1	—	2004–05
