= Bernd Roos =

German handball player (born 1967)

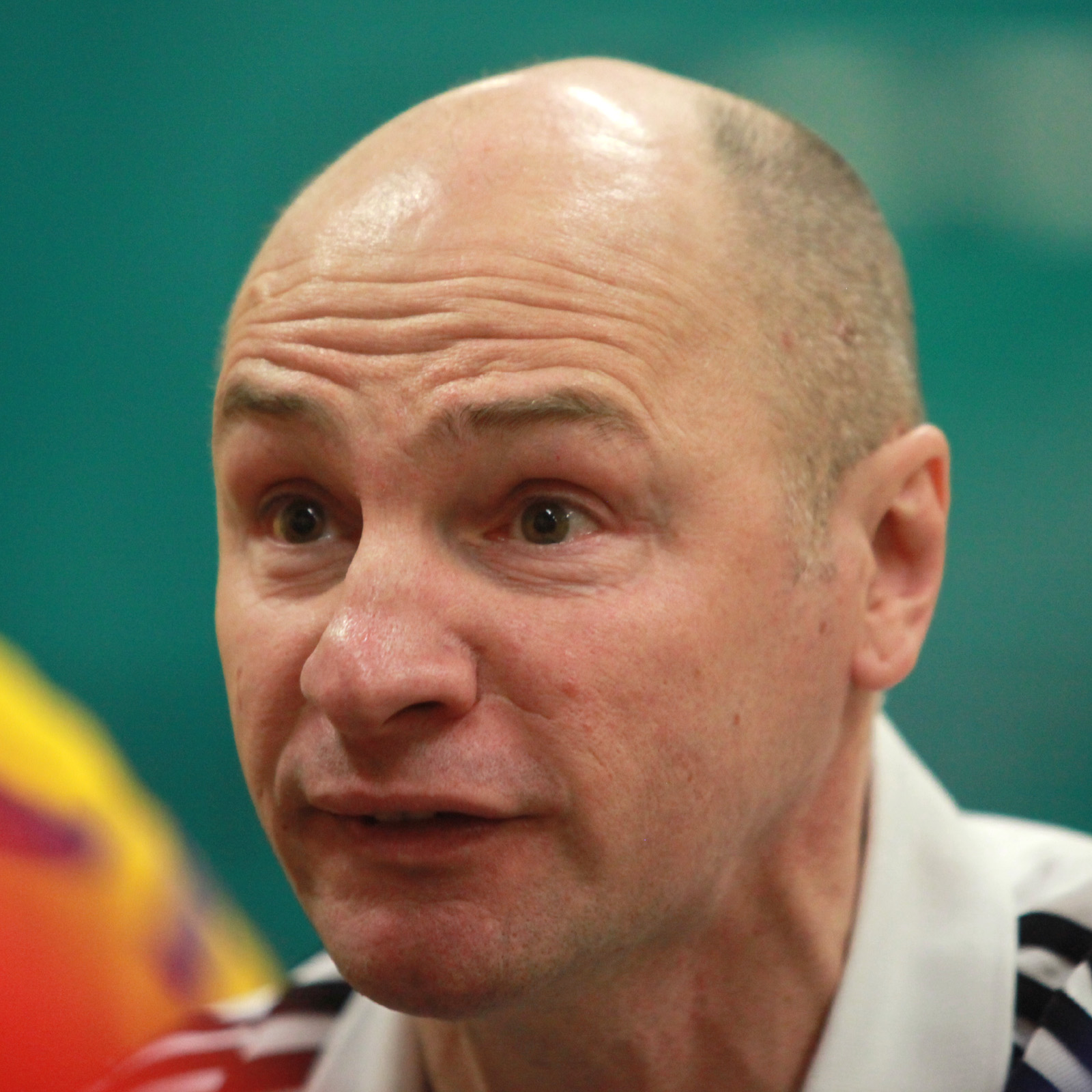
- Bernd Roos in 2012

Personal information
- Nationality: German
- Born: 1 September 1967 (age 59) Miltenberg, West Germany
- Height: 181 cm (71 in)

Sport
- Sport: Handball
- Position: Right wing
- Current club: Retired

Senior clubs
- Years: Team
- -1988: TV Kirchzell
- 1988-2003: TV Großwallstadt
- 2003-2007: TV Kirchzell
National team
Years	Team	Apps	(Gls)
1989-?	Germany	130	(500)

Teams managed
- 2009-2010: TV Hardheim 1895
- 2011-2014: TV Fränkisch-Crumbach
- 2015-2018: HSG Aschafftal

Bernd Roos (born 1 September 1967) is a German former handball player and coach. He competed at the 1992 Summer Olympics and the 2000 Summer Olympics.

== Career ==
Roos started his handball career in TV Kirchzell in Odenwald. In 1988 he joined Bundesliga team TV Großwallstadt. With the club he played for 15 seasons, scoring 1856 goals in 392 matches. At the time he retired, he was the 9th highest scoring Bundesliga player ever. He won the 1990 German Championship and the 1989 German Cup with the team.

In 2003 he returned to TV Kirchzell, where he played for four years before retiring.

In 2009 he became the coach of TV Hardheim 1895 in the lower leagues of the German handball pyramid.

From 2011 to 2014 he was the coach of lower league team TV Fränkisch-Crumbach. From 2015 to 2018 he coached HSG Aschafftal.
