= 2021–22 EHF European League =

European handball tournament

EHF European League
- 2021–22

Tournament information
- Sport: Handball
- Dates: 28 August 2021–29 May 2022
- Teams: 52 (qualification stage); 24 (group stage)
- Website: ehfel.com

Final positions
- Champions: (Portugal) SL Benfica
- Runner-up: (Germany) SC Magdeburg

Tournament statistics
- MVP: (Spain) Sergey Hernández
- Top scorer(s): (Serbia) Petar Đorđić (Croatia) Halil Jaganjac (123 goals)

The 2021–22 EHF European League was the 2nd edition of the EHF European League, the second most important European handball club competition organised by the European Handball Federation (EHF).

Benfica became the first ever Portuguese team to win the trophy and the second non-German side to win the competition since 2004.

== Qualifying rounds ==
=== First qualifying round ===
A total of 32 teams were involved in the first qualifying round. The first leg matches were held on 28–29 August 2021, while the second leg matches were held on 4–5 September 2021. The draw was held in EHF office in Vienna.

The results of this round were:

Team 1	Agg.	Team 2	1st leg	2nd leg
Bjerringbro-Silkeborg (Denmark)	49–48	(Sweden) Ystads IF	22–23	27–25
HC Kriens-Luzern (Switzerland)	42–60	(Portugal) SL Benfica	24–31	18–29
RK Celje Pivovarna Laško (Slovenia)	58–65	(Denmark) GOG Håndbold	33–29	25–36
Grupa Azoty Unia Tarnów (Poland)	51–60	(Croatia) RK Nexe	23–28	28–32
RK Vojvodina (Serbia)	49–54	(Switzerland) Kadetten Schaffhausen	26–20	23–34
Csurgói KK (Hungary)	51–58	(Romania) HC Dobrogea Sud Constanța	23–27	28–31
Górnik Zabrze (Poland)	48–57	(Norway) ØIF Arendal	19–29	29–28
Aguas Santas Milaneza (Portugal)	54–60	(Spain) BM Logroño La Rioja	26–26	28–34
Balatonfüredi KSE (Hungary)	47–47	(Sweden) HK Malmö	27–25	20–22
Azoty-Puławy (Poland)	66–46	(Croatia) MRK Sesvete	29–21	37–25
HC Prolet 62 (North Macedonia)	50–63	(Spain) Fraikin BM Granollers	21–36	29–27
Maccabi Rishon LeZion (Israel)	49–58	(Russia) HC CSKA	26–29	23–29
Rhein-Neckar Löwen (Germany)	80–44	(Turkey) Spor Toto SK	38–22	42–22
RK Trimo Trebnje (Slovenia)	59–60	(Denmark) TTH Holstebro	31–25	28–35
RK Poreč (Croatia)	39–44	(Iceland) Valur	18–22	21–22
Alpla HC Hard (Austria)	55–66	(France) Fenix Toulouse Handball	23–27	32–39

=== Second qualifying round ===
A total of 24 teams were involved in the second qualifying round draw, 16 advancing from the previous round and 8 teams entering this round. The first leg matches were held on 20–21 September., while the second leg matches were held on 27–28 September.

The results of this round were:

Team 1	Agg.	Team 2	1st leg	2nd leg
Kadetten Schaffhausen (Switzerland)	68–60	(Spain) Fraikin BM Granollers	36–33	32–27
Valur (Iceland)	47–54	(Germany) TBV Lemgo	26–27	21–27
Rhein-Neckar Löwen (Germany)	59–64	(Portugal) SL Benfica	31–31	28–33
BM Logroño La Rioja (Spain)	61–58	(Spain) CB Ademar León	34–30	27–28
Fenix Toulouse Handball (France)	59–49	(Sweden) HK Malmö	30–24	29–25
GOG Håndbold (Denmark)	57–51	(Denmark) Mors-Thy Håndbold	30–24	27–27
Azoty-Puławy (Poland)	53–65	(Germany) Füchse Berlin	24–32	29–33
USAM Nîmes Gard (France)	65–58	(Russia) HC CSKA	36–29	29–29
Orlen Wisła Płock (Poland)	45–40	(Romania) HC Dobrogea Sud Constanța	25–14	20–26
Bjerringbro-Silkeborg (Denmark)	59–59	(Croatia) RK Nexe	33–27	26–32
Sporting CP (Portugal)	62–53	(Denmark) TTH Holstebro	31–25	31–28
ØIF Arendal (Norway)	49–67	(France) PAUC	27–27	22–40

== Group stage ==
=== Seedings ===
The 24 teams were divided into six pots of four teams, with a team from each pot being drawn to each group. Teams from the same country could not be drawn into the same group.

Pot 1	Pot 2	Pot 3	Pot 4	Pot 5	Pot 6
(Spain) Bidasoa Irun; (France) HBC Nantes; (Germany) SC Magdeburg; (Hungary) Grundfos Tatabánya KC	(North Macedonia) RK Eurofarm Pelister; (Russia) Chekhovskiye Medvedi; (Switzerland) Pfadi Winterthur; (Sweden) IK Sävehof	(Finland) Cocks; (Greece) AEK Athens HC; (Slovenia) RK Gorenje Velenje; (Slovakia) HT Tatran Prešov	(France) PAUC; (Germany) Füchse Berlin; (Germany) TBV Lemgo; (Portugal) Sporting CP	(Denmark) GOG Håndbold; (Spain) BM Logroño La Rioja; (France) USAM Nîmes Gard; (Poland) Orlen Wisła Płock	(Croatia) RK Nexe; (France) Fenix Toulouse Handball; (Portugal) SL Benfica; (Switzerland) Kadetten Schaffhausen

=== Tiebreakers ===
Teams were ranked according to points (2 points for a win, 1 point for a draw, 0 points for a loss), and if tied on points, the following tiebreaking criteria were applied, in the order given, to determine the rankings:

1. Points in matches among tied teams;
2. Goal difference in matches among tied teams;
3. Away goals scored in matches among tied teams;
4. Goal difference in all group matches;
5. Goals scored in all group matches;
6. If more than two teams were tied, and after applying all head-to-head criteria above, a subset of teams were still tied, all head-to-head criteria above were reapplied exclusively to this subset of teams;
7. Drawing lots.

=== Group A ===
Pos	Team	Pld	W	D	L	GF	GA	GD	Pts	Qualification	ORL	FUC	FEN	BID	TAT	WIN
1	(Poland) Orlen Wisła Płock	10	9	0	1	311	258	+53	18	Knockout stage	—	24–28	33–29	33–26	33–29	35–27
2	(Germany) Füchse Berlin	10	8	0	2	314	269	+45	16	Knockout stage	29–30	—	32–30	35–23	36–23	35–29
3	(France) Fenix Toulouse Handball	10	6	1	3	292	265	+27	13	Knockout stage	24–30	28–27	—	26–26	34–20	34–27
4	(Spain) Bidasoa Irun	10	3	1	6	286	286	0	7	Knockout stage	28–29	32–35	24–26	—	33–24	32–28
5	(Slovakia) HT Tatran Prešov	10	2	0	8	240	308	−68	4		15–29	23–27	19–31	27–25	—	29–33
6	(Switzerland) Pfadi Winterthur	10	1	0	9	271	328	−57	2		23–35	27–30	27–30	23–37	27–31	—

Source: EHF
Rules for classification: Tiebreakers

=== Group B ===
Pos	Team	Pld	W	D	L	GF	GA	GD	Pts	Qualification	GOG	BEN	NAN	LEM	COC	CHE
1	(Denmark) GOG Håndbold	10	7	1	2	340	297	+43	15	Knockout stage	—	39–38	29–29	34–28	46–30	27–26
2	(Portugal) SL Benfica	10	7	1	2	336	311	+25	15	Knockout stage	25–33	—	31–30	35–30	37–23	38–35
3	(France) HBC Nantes	10	5	3	2	304	266	+38	13	Knockout stage	27–24	33–33	—	27–28	36–25	10–0 (Note: The match was cancelled because of the Russian invasion of Ukraine.)
4	(Germany) TBV Lemgo	10	5	2	3	319	312	+7	12	Knockout stage	39–35	29–30	37–37	—	39–30	30–27
5	(Finland) Cocks	10	1	1	8	257	331	−74	3		23–34	32–37	28–40	29–29	—	27–33
6	(Russia) Chekhovskiye Medvedi	10	1	0	9	239	278	−39	2		32–39	27–32	31–35	28–30	0–10 (Note: The match was cancelled because of the Russian invasion of Ukraine.)	—

Source: EHF
Rules for classification: Tiebreakers

=== Group C ===
Pos	Team	Pld	W	D	L	GF	GA	GD	Pts	Qualification	MAG	SAV	NEX	GOR	LOG	PAU
1	(Germany) SC Magdeburg	10	9	1	0	317	267	+50	19	Knockout stage	—	31–25	32–26	34–24	33–31	31–27
2	(Sweden) IK Sävehof	10	6	0	4	313	297	+16	12	Knockout stage	26–29	—	33–23	27–28	43–31	33–31
3	(Croatia) RK Nexe	10	5	0	5	295	300	−5	10	Knockout stage	24–28	39–31	—	31–23	31–30	33–29
4	(Slovenia) RK Gorenje Velenje	10	4	1	5	284	306	−22	9	Knockout stage	27–31	31–35	34–28	—	32–31	33–32
5	(Spain) BM Logroño La Rioja	10	3	1	6	307	317	−10	7		29–29	29–30	31–30	31–26	—	33–26
6	(France) PAUC	10	1	1	8	290	319	−29	3		28–39	25–30	29–30	26–26	37–31	—

Source: EHF
Rules for classification: Tiebreakers

=== Group D ===
Pos	Team	Pld	W	D	L	GF	GA	GD	Pts	Qualification	NIM	EUR	KAD	SPO	AEK	GRU
1	(France) USAM Nîmes Gard	10	5	2	3	290	274	+16	12	Knockout stage	—	25–23	33–33	33–27	26–27	24–22
2	(North Macedonia) RK Eurofarm Pelister	10	5	2	3	271	248	+23	12	Knockout stage	21–26	—	27–26	31–25	30–19	33–20
3	(Switzerland) Kadetten Schaffhausen	10	4	3	3	282	277	+5	11	Knockout stage	25–25	28–28	—	26–24	30–26	32–26
4	(Portugal) Sporting CP	10	5	1	4	290	279	+11	11	Knockout stage	32–30	27–27	29–28	—	31–30	34–26
5	(Greece) AEK Athens HC	10	4	0	6	274	283	−9	8		34–30	27–30	28–31	25–24	—	34–26
6	(Hungary) Grundfos Tatabánya KC	10	3	0	7	254	300	−46	6		30–38	25–21	31–23	23–37	25–24	—

Source: EHF
Rules for classification: Tiebreakers

== Knockout stage ==
The pairings for the last 16 and the quarterfinals are based on group stage standings, according to the following bracket. This assures teams from the same group can only play each other again in the final four.

Last 16
29 March/5 April
3D (Switzerland) Kadetten Schaffhausen	32	28	60
2C (Sweden) IK Sävehof	26	34	60
29 March/5 April
4B (Germany) TBV Lemgo	28	28	56
1A (Poland) Orlen Wisła Płock	31	28	59
29 March/5 April
3C (Croatia) RK Nexe	29	22	51
2D (North Macedonia) RK Eurofarm Pelister	26	21	47
29 March/5 April
4A (Spain) Bidasoa Irun	28	31	59
1B (Denmark) GOG Håndbold	30	33	63
29 March/5 April
3B (France) HBC Nantes	25	33	58
2A (Germany) Füchse Berlin	24	30	54
29 March/5 April
4D (Portugal) Sporting CP	29	35	64
1C (Germany) SC Magdeburg	29	36	65
29 March/5 April
3A (France) Fenix Toulouse Handball	38	30	68
2B (Portugal) SL Benfica	34	36	70
29 March/5 April
4C (Slovenia) RK Gorenje Velenje	29	30	59
1D (France) USAM Nîmes Gard	22	35	57

Quarterfinals
26 April/3 May
3D (Switzerland) Kadetten Schaffhausen	31	22	53
1A (Poland) Orlen Wisła Płock	33	35	68
26 April/3 May
3C (Croatia) RK Nexe	32	37	69
1B (Denmark) GOG Håndbold	27	37	64
26 April/3 May
3B (France) HBC Nantes	25	28	53
1C (Germany) SC Magdeburg	28	30	58
26 April/3 May
2B (Portugal) SL Benfica	36	27	63
4C (Slovenia) RK Gorenje Velenje	29	27	56

=== Last 16 ===
The last 16 first legs were scheduled for 29 March 2022, while the second legs followed on 5 April 2022.

Team 1	Agg.	Team 2	1st leg	2nd leg
Kadetten Schaffhausen (Switzerland)	60–60 (a)	(Sweden) IK Sävehof	32–26	28–34
TBV Lemgo (Germany)	56–59	(Poland) Orlen Wisła Płock	28–31	28–28
RK Nexe (Croatia)	51–47	(North Macedonia) RK Eurofarm Pelister	29–26	22–21
Bidasoa Irun (Spain)	59–63	(Denmark) GOG Håndbold	28–30	31–33
HBC Nantes (France)	58–54	(Germany) Füchse Berlin	25–24	33–30
Sporting CP (Portugal)	64–65	(Germany) SC Magdeburg	29–29	35–36
Fenix Toulouse Handball (France)	68–70	(Portugal) SL Benfica	38–34	30–36
RK Gorenje Velenje (Slovenia)	59–57	(France) USAM Nîmes Gard	29–22	30–35

=== Quarterfinals ===
The quarterfinals first legs were scheduled for 26 April 2022, while the second legs followed on 3 May 2022.

Team 1	Agg.	Team 2	1st leg	2nd leg
Kadetten Schaffhausen (Switzerland)	53–68	(Poland) Orlen Wisła Płock	31–33	22–35
RK Nexe (Croatia)	69–64	(Denmark) GOG Håndbold	32–27	37–37
HBC Nantes (France)	53–58	(Germany) SC Magdeburg	25–28	28–30
SL Benfica (Portugal)	63–56	(Slovenia) RK Gorenje Velenje	36–29	27–27

=== Final four ===
The 2021–22 EHF European League Finals was played on 28 and 29 May 2022 in Lisbon, Portugal and comprise one leg semifinals, final and a third place game. The pairings for the semifinals were decided by drawing of lots.

==== Bracket ====
Semifinals
28 May
(Germany) SC Magdeburg	34
(Croatia) RK Nexe	29
28 May
(Poland) Orlen Wisła Płock	19
(Portugal) SL Benfica	26

Final
29 May
(Portugal) SL Benfica	40
(Germany) SC Magdeburg	39
Third place
29 May
(Poland) Orlen Wisła Płock	27
(Croatia) RK Nexe	22

==== Semifinals ====
28 May 2022; 16:00	SC Magdeburg (Germany)	34–29	(Croatia) RK Nexe	Altice Arena, Lisbon; Attendance: 2,114; Referees: Mažeika, Gatelis (LTU)
28 May 2022; 16:00	Musche 8	(18–13)	Jaganjac 7	Altice Arena, Lisbon; Attendance: 2,114; Referees: Mažeika, Gatelis (LTU)
28 May 2022; 16:00	2× (yellow card) 4× (suspension)	Report	6× (suspension)	Altice Arena, Lisbon; Attendance: 2,114; Referees: Mažeika, Gatelis (LTU)

28 May 2022; 18:30	Orlen Wisła Płock (Poland)	19–26	(Portugal) SL Benfica	Altice Arena, Lisbon; Attendance: 3,201; Referees: Horváth, Marton (HUN)
28 May 2022; 18:30	Szita 4	(8–10)	Đorđić 9	Altice Arena, Lisbon; Attendance: 3,201; Referees: Horváth, Marton (HUN)
28 May 2022; 18:30	2× (yellow card) 3× (suspension) 1× (red card)	Report	1× (yellow card) 5× (suspension)	Altice Arena, Lisbon; Attendance: 3,201; Referees: Horváth, Marton (HUN)

==== Third place game ====
29 May 2022; 16:30	Orlen Wisła Płock (Poland)	27–22	(Croatia) RK Nexe	Altice Arena, Lisbon; Attendance: 2,249; Referees: Mitrevski, Todorovski (MKD)
29 May 2022; 16:30	Mihić 5	(14–13)	Pribetić 5	Altice Arena, Lisbon; Attendance: 2,249; Referees: Mitrevski, Todorovski (MKD)
29 May 2022; 16:30	1× (yellow card) 2× (suspension) 1× (red card)	Report	2× (yellow card) 1× (suspension)	Altice Arena, Lisbon; Attendance: 2,249; Referees: Mitrevski, Todorovski (MKD)

==== Final ====
29 May 2022
19:00
SL Benfica (Portugal)
40–39 (ET)
(Germany) SC Magdeburg
Altice Arena, Lisbon
Attendance: 5,055
Referees: Brunner, Salah (SUI)
Rahmel 11
(15–14)
Magnússon 12
1× (yellow card) 8× (suspension) 1× (red card)
Report
1× (yellow card) 6× (suspension)

FT: 32–32 ET: 8–7

== Top goalscorers ==
Rank	Player	Club	Goals
1	(Serbia) Petar Đorđić	(Portugal) SL Benfica	123
1	(Croatia) Halil Jaganjac	(Croatia) RK Nexe	123
3	(Egypt) Mohammad Sanad	(France) USAM Nîmes Gard	122
4	(Sweden) Jerry Tollbring	(Denmark) GOG Håndbold	104
5	(Germany) Ole Rahmel	(Portugal) SL Benfica	99
6	(Iceland) Bjarki Már Elísson	(Germany) TBV Lemgo	98
7	(Switzerland) Samuel Zehnder	(Switzerland) Kadetten Schaffhausen	92
8	(Denmark) Simon Pytlick	(Denmark) GOG Håndbold	80
9	(Montenegro) Fahrudin Melić	(Croatia) RK Nexe	79
10	(Spain) Agustín Casado	(Spain) BM Logroño La Rioja	78
10	(Russia) Sergei Kosorotov	(Poland) Orlen Wisła Płock	78
