= S.L. Benfica (handball) =

Portuguese handball club

Benfica
- Full name: Sport Lisboa e Benfica
- Nickname(s): As Águias (The Eagles); Os Encarnados (The Reds)
- Founded: 8 May 1932 (94 years ago) (parent club in 1904)
- Arena: Pavilhão da Luz Nº 2
- Capacity: 1,800
- President: Filipe Gomes
- Head coach: Jota González
- League: Andebol 1
- 2025–26: Andebol 1, 3rd
- Club colours
Home	Away

Sport Lisboa e Benfica (Portuguese pronunciation: [sɨˈpɔɾ liʒˈβoɐ i βɐ̃jˈfikɐ]), commonly known as Benfica, is a professional handball team based in Lisbon, Portugal.

Benfica play in the top tier domestic league, Andebol 1, and hold home matches at the Pavilhão da Luz Nº 2. Since its inception in 1932, Benfica have won 7 Portuguese League titles, 6 Portuguese Cups, 2 Portuguese League Cups, and 7 Portuguese Super Cups. Internationally, Benfica won the EHF European League in 2021–22, becoming the first Portuguese club to win the competition.

In addition to the club's men's reserve team, Benfica B, playing in the second division, Benfica also has a women's team, who are the current Portuguese champions, having won 12 League titles, 10 Cups, 1 Federation Cup and 6 Super Cups.

== History ==
=== Beginning ===
Founded on 8 May 1932, Benfica's handball section endured a troubled start shortly after being founded. It was inactive from 1939 to 1942–43 because of a conflict between Benfica and the Portuguese Handball Federation. Until the 1960s, handball was played by eleven players, and after 1962–63, in another dispute with the federation, Benfica closed the eleven players team and opted for the current team handball. The handball section did not achieve success until 1961–62, being overshadowed by the football, cycling, basketball and roller hockey sections of the club during that time.

=== Golden years ===
After a period of dominance by crosstown rivals Sporting CP, Benfica experienced great success in the 1980s and early 1990s, when was led by coach Eugene Troffin, and later by Ângelo Pintado, along with players such as Paulo Bunze, Swedish international Fredrik Appelgren, Dogărescu, Covaciu and Drăgăniță, goalkeeper João Santa Bárbara, wingman Mário Gentil, Vasco Vasconcelos, Luís Lopes and Rui Ferreira; Benfica won four national championships, three Portuguese Cup and two Portuguese Super Cup.

=== Decay ===
In the 1997–98 season, club president João Vale e Azevedo decided to shut down the section. It was restarted in the next season, but from the Regional Championship, four divisions away from the top flight.

=== Rebuilding years ===
In 2005, after years in anonymity, Benfica hired former ABC Braga coach Aleksander Donner on a three-year deal. Because of a dispute between Liga and the Handball Federation, which managed the Divisão de Elite, there were two simultaneous championships. In the 2005–06 season, Benfica played in the Divisão de Elite. In 2006–07, Benfica joined the Liga Portuguesa de Andebol along with Sporting CP. During that season, Benfica won their first title since 1994, the League Cup. In the following season, Benfica finally achieved their first league title since 1990. Despite the success, Aleksander Donner did not renew his contract at the end of the season.

=== Recent years ===
To replace Donner, Benfica hired José António Silva, who won three titles in three years: the 2008–09 League Cup, 2010–11 Portuguese Cup and 2010 Super Cup. In the 2010–11 season, Benfica reached the final of the EHF Challenge Cup, but lost to Slovene side RK Cimos Koper. In 2011–12, José António Silva was replaced by another former ABC Braga coach, Jorge Rito. With him, Benfica finished fourth in league for the first time. On 2 September 2012, Jorge Rito won Benfica's fourth Super Cup trophy. The season ended with only a second place in the league. In 2013–14, Benfica's performances worsened, and the team finished the league in fourth place. Jorge Rito did not renew his contract and was replaced by Mariano Ortega. On 3 April 2016, Benfica, who had beaten rivals FC Porto in the semi-finals the day before, beat Lisbon rivals Sporting in the final and conquered their fifth Portuguese Cup, ending a four-year trophy drought.

== Current squad ==
Squad for the 2025–26 season:

Goalkeepers

- 16 (Brazil) Rangel da Rosa
- 41 (Portugal) Gustavo Capdeville
- 65 (Portugal) Bernardo Almeida

Left wingers

- 2 (Spain) Miguel Sánchez-Migallón
- 7 (Iceland) Stiven Valencia

Right wingers

- 4 (Sweden) Christopher Hedberg
- 55 (Belarus) Mikita Vailupau

Line players

- 20 (Portugal) Fábio Silva
- 21 (Spain) Aldo Pagliotta
- 22 (Portugal) Alexis Borges
- 99 (Spain) Javier Rodríguez Moreno

Left backs

- 5 (Portugal) Gabriel Cavalcanti
- 6 (Portugal) Miguel Mendes
- 9 (Spain) Pau Oliveras
- 97 (Cuba) Reinier Taboada

Central backs

- 15 (Spain) Alejandro Barbeito
- 23 (Spain) El Korchi
- 24 (Spain) Ander Izquierdo

Right backs

- 10 (Denmark) Kristian Olsen
- 11 (Portugal) Belone Moreira

=== Transfers ===
Transfers for the 2026–27 season

Joining

- (Sweden) Tobias Thulin (GK) from (Hungary) OTP Bank – Pick Szeged
- (Sweden) William Bogojevic (LB) from (Germany) SC DHfK Leipzig
- (Norway) Sindre Heldal (LW) from (France) Paris Saint-Germain
- (France) Aurélien Padolus (LB) from (France) Istres Provence Handball
- (Iceland) Breki Hrafn Árnason (GK) from (Iceland) Fram Reykjavík
- (Portugal) Joaquim Nazaré (RB) from (Denmark) Skjern Håndbold
- (Portugal) Gonçalo Meireles (LW) from (Portugal) ABC Braga
- (Portugal) Bernardo Pegas (RB) from (Portugal) Águas Santas
- (Portugal) Rui Baptista (CB) back from loan at (Spain) Club Balonmano Nava
- (Portugal) Gustavo Oliveira (LB) back from loan at (Spain) BM Atlético Valladolid
- (Portugal) Afonso Freire Mendes (RW) back from loan at (Spain) BM Rebi Cuenca

Leaving

- (Brazil) Rangel da Rosa (GK) to (Spain) Balonmano Torrelavega
- (Spain) Miguel Sánchez-Migallón (LW) to (Serbia) RK Partizan
- (Spain) Pau Oliveras (LB) to (France) Istres Provence Handball
- (Spain) Ismael El-Korchi (CB) to (Turkey) Beşiktaş JK
- (Iceland) Stiven Valencia (LW) to (Iceland) Valur
- (Netherlands) (Cuba) Reinier Taboada (LB) to (Denmark) SønderjyskE
- (Portugal) Gabriel Cavalcanti (LB) to (France) Chambéry SMBH
- (Portugal) Gustavo Capdeville (GK) to (Denmark) TTH Holstebro
- (Portugal) Rui Baptista (CB) to (Portugal) Águas Santas
- (Portugal) Gustavo Oliveira (LB) to (Spain) BM Logroño La Rioja

=== Transfer History ===
Transfers for the 2025–26 season

Joining

- (Belarus) Mikita Vailupau (RW) from (Hungary) ONE Veszprém
- (Brazil) Rangel da Rosa (GK) from (France) Saint-Raphaël Var Handball
- (Netherlands) (Cuba) Reinier Taboada (LB) from (Denmark) Fredericia HK
- (Spain) Javier Rodríguez Moreno (LP) from (Spain) FC Barcelona
- (Spain) Pau Oliveras (LB) from (France) Saran Loiret Handball
- (Spain) Alejandro Barbeito (CB) from (France) US Créteil Handball
- (Spain) Ismael El-Korchi (CB) from (Spain) CB Ciudad de Logroño
- (Denmark) Kristian Olsen (RB) from (Sweden) Ystads IF
- (Portugal) Afonso Freire Mendes (RW) back from loan at (Portugal) SC Horta

Leaving

- (North Macedonia) Filip Taleski (LB) to (North Macedonia) RK Vardar
- (Romania) Demis Grigoraș (RB) to (Hungary) MOL Tatabánya KC
- (Hungary) Egon Hanusz (CB) to (France) Cesson Rennes MHB
- (Brazil) Guilherme Carvalho Cabral (LP) to (Spain) Recoletas Atlético Valladolid
- (Spain) Aldo Pagliotta (LP) to (Portugal) CF Belenenses
- (Portugal) Rui Baptista (CB) on loan at (Spain) Club Balonmano Nava
- (Portugal) Afonso Freire Mendes (RW) on loan at (Spain) BM Rebi Cuenca

== Results in international competition ==
Note: Benfica score is always listed first. H = home match; A = away match

Season	Competition	Round	Opponent	Score
1962–63	European Cup	Round 1	(Spain) Atlético Madrid BM	13–6
1975–76	European Cup	Round 1	(Spain) CB Alicante	Withdrew
1982–83	European Cup	Round 1	(Spain) FC Barcelona	25–32; 18–32
1983–84	European Cup	Round 1	(Austria) ATSE Graz	25–25 (H); 20–29 (A)
1987–88	EHF Cup Winners' Cup	Round 1	(Spain) Atlético Madrid BM	21–20 (H); 11–29 (A)
1989–90	European Cup	Round 1	(Spain) FC Barcelona	20–18 (H); 17–28 (A)
1990–91	European Cup	Round 1	(Luxembourg) Red Boys Differdange	28–18 (H); 26–28 (A)
1990–91	European Cup	Round 2	(France) USAM Nîmes	23–21 (H); 23–31 (A)
1993–94	EHF City Cup	1/16 Finals	(Italy) Pallamano Rubiera	27–19 (H); 20–22 (A)
1993–94	EHF City Cup	1/8 Finals	(Hungary) ETO Győri	24–21 (A); 19–17 (H)
1993–94	EHF City Cup	1/4 Finals	(France) PSG Asnieres Hand-Ball	27–32 (A); 25–28 (H)
1995–96	EHF City Cup	1/16 Finals	(Switzerland) ZMC Amicitia Zürich	19–30 (A); 30–27 (H)
1996–97	EHF City Cup	1/16 Finals	(North Macedonia) Borec Veles	18–15 (A); 32–14 (H)
1996–97	EHF City Cup	1/8 Finals	(Netherlands) Horn/Sittardia	21–14 (H); 15–29 (A)
1997–98	EHF City Cup	1/16 Finals	(Greece) ESN Vrilissia	26–21 (A); 30–12 (H)
1997–98	EHF City Cup	1/8 Finals	(Turkey) Trabzon Belediyespor	27–20 (H); 30–30 (A)
1997–98	EHF City Cup	1/4 Finals	(Spain) Academia Octavio Vigo	22–32 (A); 25–23 (H)
1998–99	EHF City Cup	1/16 Finals	(Switzerland) BSV Wacker Thun	0–10 (A); 0–10 (H)
2002–03	EHF Cup Winners' Cup	Round 3	(Finland) Dennis Turku	14–26 (A); 17–25 (H)
2007–08	EHF Challenge Cup	Round 3	(Montenegro) HC "Mojkovac"	46–22 (A); 46–26 (H)
2007–08	EHF Challenge Cup	1/8 Final	(Ukraine) Shakhtar-Academiya	33–26 (A); 21–25 (H)
2007–08	EHF Challenge Cup	1/4 Final	(Romania) CSU Poli-Izometal Timişoara	32–22 (H); 22–21 (A)
2007–08	EHF Challenge Cup	1/2 Final	(Romania) UCM Sport Reșița	31–26 (H); 25–32 (A)
2008–09	EHF Champions League	Qualification Round 1	(Austria) A1 Bregenz	38–34 (H); 28–35 (A)
2008–09	EHF Cup	Round 2	(Montenegro) RK Lovćen	26–28 (A); 24–23 (H)
2009–10	EHF Cup	Round 2	(Georgia (country)) H/C "Tbilisi"	34–21 (H); 29–25 (A)
2009–10	EHF Cup	Round 3	(Russia) SKIF Krasnodar	29–28 (A); 35–30 (H)
2009–10	EHF Cup	Round 4	(Germany) TBV Lemgo	30–27 (A); 18–31 (H)
2010–11	EHF Challenge Cup	Round 3	(Romania) CSA Steaua București	43–29 (H); 23–29 (A)
2010–11	EHF Challenge Cup	Last 16	(Ukraine) HC "Motor-ZNTU-ZAS"	33–28 (A); 30–23 (H)
2010–11	EHF Challenge Cup	Quarter-finals	(Serbia) Radnički Kragujevac	28–29 (A); 29–21 (H)
2010–11	EHF Challenge Cup	Semi-finals	(Serbia) Partizan Dunav Osiguranje	30–36 (A); 33–25 (H)
2010–11	EHF Challenge Cup	Finals	(Slovenia) RK Cimos Koper	27–27 (H); 27–31 (A)
2011–12	EHF Cup Winners' Cup	Round 3	(Montenegro) HC Lovćen-Cetinje	25–21 (A); 26–14 (H)
2011–12	EHF Cup Winners' Cup	Last 16	(Romania) Pandurii Târgu Jiu	33–27 (A); 41–24 (H)
2011–12	EHF Cup Winners' Cup	Quarter-finals	(Slovenia) HC Celje Pivovarna Lasko	23–29 (A); 31–30 (H)
2012–13	EHF Cup	Round 1	(Switzerland) Pfadi Winterthur	28–21 (A); 27–27 (H)
2012–13	EHF Cup	Round 2	(Italy) Loacker Südtirol Team	32–20 (H); 40–25 (H)
2012–13	EHF Cup	Round 3	(France) HBC Nantes	21–29 (A); 28–21 (H)
2013–14	EHF Cup	Round 2	(Iceland) Haukar	34–22 (A); 34–19 (H)
2013–14	EHF Cup	Round 3	(Hungary) Pick Szeged	25–31 (A); 24–25 (H)
2014–15	EHF Challenge Cup	Round 3	(Norway) FyllingenBergen	33–32 (H); 28–25 (H)
2014–15	EHF Challenge Cup	Last 16	(Luxembourg) HB Dudelange	36–30 (H); 28–24 (H)
2014–15	EHF Challenge Cup	Quarter-finals	(Poland) KS Azoty-Puławy	37–29 (A); 32–31 (H)
2014–15	EHF Challenge Cup	Semi-final	(Romania) Odorheiu Secuiesc	29–31 (A); 25–27 (H)
2015–16	EHF Challenge Cup	Round 3	(Iceland) ÍBV Vestmannaeyjar	28–26 (A); 34–26 (H)
2015–16	EHF Challenge Cup	Last 16	(Greece) A.C. Filippos Verias	34–14 (H); 23–26 (A)
2015–16	EHF Challenge Cup	Quarter-finals	(Russia) St. Petersburg HC	24–20 (H); 25–27 (A)
2015–16	EHF Challenge Cup	Semi-finals	(Norway) FyllingenBergen	35–22 (H); 29–27 (A)
2015–16	EHF Challenge Cup	Finals	(Portugal) ABC/UMinho	22–28 (H); 29–25 (A)
2016–17	EHF Cup	Qualification Round 2	(Luxembourg) Käerjeng	31–26 (H); 33–30 (A)
2016–17	EHF Cup	Qualification Round 3	(Poland) KS Azoty-Puławy	29–34 (A); 24–18 (H)
2016–17	EHF Cup	Group D	(Germany) MT Melsungen	22–32 (A); 26–24 (H)
2016–17	EHF Cup	Group D	(Spain) Helvetia Anaitasuna	33–28 (H); 28–35 (A)
2016–17	EHF Cup	Group D	(Finland) Riihimäki Cocks	23–21 (A); 26–25 (H)
2017–18	EHF Cup	Qualification Round 1	(Serbia) HC Dinamo Pančevo	39–20 (H); 28–35 (H)
2017–18	EHF Cup	Qualification Round 2	(Poland) Gwardia Opole	28–24 (H); 21–26 (A)
2018–19	EHF Cup	Qualification Round 2	(Iceland) FH Hafnarfjordur	37–32 (H); 34–31 (H)
2018–19	EHF Cup	Qualification Round 3	(Germany) TSV Hannover-Burgdorf	36–41 (A); 33–33 (H)
2019–20	EHF Cup	Qualification Round 2	(Croatia) RK Dubrava	29–28 (H); 34–16 (H)
2019–20	EHF Cup	Qualification Round 3	(Croatia) RK Nexe	26–30 (A); 28–24 (H)
2019–20	EHF Cup	Group A (cancelled due to the COVID-19 pandemic)	(Denmark) Bjerringbro-Silkeborg	33–24 (A) (H) cancelled
2019–20	EHF Cup	Group A (cancelled due to the COVID-19 pandemic)	(Germany) MT Melsungen	29–26 (H) (A) cancelled
2019–20	EHF Cup	Group A (cancelled due to the COVID-19 pandemic)	(Poland) Gwardia Opole	29–24 (H); 30–23 (A)
2020–21	EHF European League	Qualification Round 1	(Austria) Fivers	28–26 (H); 34–38 (A)
2021–22	EHF European League	Qualification Round 1	(Switzerland) HC Kriens-Luzern	31–24 (A); 29–18 (H)
2021–22	EHF European League	Qualification Round 2	(Germany) Rhein-Neckar Löwen	31–31 (A); 33–28 (H)
2021–22	EHF European League	Group B	(France) HBC Nantes	31–30 (H); 33–33 (A)
2021–22	EHF European League	Group B	(Denmark) GOG Håndbold	38–39 (A); 25–33 (H)
2021–22	EHF European League	Group B	(Russia) Chekhovskiye Medvedi	32–27 (A); 38–35 (H)
2021–22	EHF European League	Group B	(Germany) TBV Lemgo	35–30 (H); 30–29 (A)
2021–22	EHF European League	Group B	(Finland) Riihimäki Cocks	37–23 (H); 37–32 (A)
2021–22	EHF European League	Last 16	(France) Fenix Toulouse Handball	34–38 (A); 36–30 (H)
2021–22	EHF European League	Quarter-finals	(Slovenia) RK Gorenje Velenje	36–29 (H); 27–27 (H)
2021–22	EHF European League	Semi-finals	(Poland) Orlen Wisła Płock	26–19
2021–22	EHF European League	Final	(Germany) SC Magdeburg	40–39 (a.e.t.)
2022–23	EHF European League	Group A	(Slovakia) Tatran Prešov	29–25 (A); 35–28 (H)
2022–23	EHF European League	Group A	(Germany) Frisch Auf Göppingen	27–31 (H); 29–31 (A)
2022–23	EHF European League	Group A	(Hungary) Fejér B.Á.L. Veszprém	39–35 (H); 35–26 (A)
2022–23	EHF European League	Group A	(Switzerland) Kadetten Schaffhausen	25–26 (A); 27–28 (H)
2022–23	EHF European League	Group A	(France) Montpellier HB	24–26 (H); 27–33 (A)
2022–23	EHF European League	Last 16	(Germany) SG Flensburg-Handewitt	26–39 (H); 28–33 (A)
2023–24	EHF European League	Group A	(Sweden) IFK Kristianstad	31–27 (A); 36–33 (H)
2023–24	EHF European League	Group A	(France) HBC Nantes	34–38 (H); 28–37 (A)
2023–24	EHF European League	Group A	(Germany) Rhein-Neckar Löwen	30–39 (A); 35–36 (H)
2024–25	EHF European League	Group C	(Switzerland) Kadetten Schaffhausen	26–25 (A); 39–32 (H)
2024–25	EHF European League	Group C	(France) Limoges Handball	37–31 (H); 28–36 (A)
2024–25	EHF European League	Group C	(Slovakia) HT Tatran Prešov	24–16 (A); 36–23 (H)
2024–25	EHF European League	Main round – Group II	(Spain) CD Bidasoa Irun	27–28 (A); 33–30 (H)
2024–25	EHF European League	Main round – Group II	(Sweden) Ystads IF	36–31 (H); 33–37 (A)
2024–25	EHF European League	Play-offs	(Denmark) GOG Håndbold	33–31 (H); 31–34 (A)
2025–26	EHF European League	Group E	(Germany) MT Melsungen	26–28 (A); 26–30 (H)
2025–26	EHF European League	Group E	(Hungary) Ferencvárosi	38–25 (H); 31–33 (A)
2025–26	EHF European League	Group E	(Sweden) HF Karlskrona	34–32 (A); 36–33 (H)
2025–26	EHF European League	Main round – Group III	(North Macedonia) RK Vardar	40–35 (H); 27–33 (A)
2025–26	EHF European League	Main round – Group III	(Sweden) IFK Kristianstad	38–34 (A); 22–30 (A)
2026–27	EHF European League	Group F	(Spain) Balonmano Torrelavega	24–31 (H) (A)
2026–27	EHF European League	Group F	(Denmark) TTH Holstebro	31–32 (A) (H)
2026–27	EHF European League	Group F	(Czech Republic) HCB Karviná	35–26 (A) (H)

== Honours ==
According to Benfica's official website

=== Domestic competitions ===
- Portuguese League

Winners (7): 1961–62, 1974–75, 1981–82, 1982–83, 1988–89, 1989–90, 2007–08

- Portuguese Cup

Winners (6): 1984–85, 1985–86, 1986–87, 2010–11, 2015–16, 2017–18

- Portuguese League Cup

Winners (2): 2006–07, 2008–09

- Portuguese Super Cup

Winners (7): 1989, 1993, 2010, 2012, 2016, 2018, 2022

=== International competitions ===
- EHF European League

Winners (1): 2021–22

- EHF European Cup

Runners-up (2): 2010–11, 2015–16

== Women's honours ==
According to Benfica's official website

- Portuguese League

Winners (12): 1983–84, 1985–86, 1986–87, 1988–89, 1989–90, 1991–92, 1992–93, 2021–22, 2022–23, 2023–24, 2024–25, 2025-26

- Portuguese Cup

Winners (10): 1984–85, 1985–86, 1986–87, 1987–88, 1988–89, 1991–92, 2021–22, 2022–23, 2024–25, 2025-26

- FAP Cup

Winners (1): 2023-24

- Portuguese Super Cup

Winners (6): 1990, 1992, 2022, 2023, 2025, 2026
