= 2024–25 EHF European League main round =

The 2024–25 EHF European League main round was played between 11 February and 4 March 2025 to determine the twelve teams advancing to the knockout stage of the 2024–25 EHF European League.

== Qualified teams ==
| Group | Winners | Runners-up |
|---|---|---|
| A | (Switzerland) HC Kriens-Luzern | (Denmark) GOG Håndbold |
| B | (France) Montpellier Handball | (Spain) Fraikin BM Granollers |
| C | (Portugal) SL Benfica | (France) Limoges Handball |
| D | (Spain) CD Bidasoa Irun | (Sweden) Ystads IF |
| E | (Germany) THW Kiel | (Serbia) RK Vojvodina |
| F | (Germany) MT Melsungen | (Portugal) FC Porto |
| G | (Germany) SG Flensburg-Handewitt | (Hungary) MOL-Tatabánya KC |
| H | (Germany) VfL Gummersbach | (France) Fenix Toulouse Handball |

== Format ==
In each group, teams played against the teams they didn't play in the group stage. Games involving teams who advanced from the same group in the previous round are carried over to the main round.

== Tiebreakers ==
In the group stage, teams were ranked according to points (2 points for a win, 1 point for a draw, 0 points for a loss), and if tied on points, the following tiebreaking criteria were applied, in the order given, to determine the rankings:

1. Points in matches among tied teams;
2. Goal difference in matches among tied teams;
3. Goal difference in all group matches;
4. Goals scored in all group matches;
5. If more than two teams were tied, and after applying all head-to-head criteria above, a subset of teams were still tied, all head-to-head criteria above were reapplied exclusively to this subset of teams;
6. Drawing lots.

== Groups ==
All times are local.

=== Group I ===
| Pos | Team | Pld | W | D | L | GF | GA | GD | Pts | Qualification | MON | GOG | LUZ | GRA |
|---|---|---|---|---|---|---|---|---|---|---|---|---|---|---|
| 1 | (France) Montpellier Handball | 6 | 5 | 0 | 1 | 182 | 168 | +14 | 10 | Quarterfinals | — | 30–28 | 31–27 | 34–25 |
| 2 | (Denmark) GOG Håndbold | 6 | 3 | 1 | 2 | 198 | 192 | +6 | 7 | Play Offs | 33–27 | — | 39–36 | 32–31 |
| 3 | (Switzerland) HC Kriens-Luzern | 6 | 2 | 0 | 4 | 198 | 205 | −7 | 4 | Play Offs | 31–32 | 32–30 | — | 43–42 |
| 4 | (Spain) Fraikin BM Granollers | 6 | 1 | 1 | 4 | 189 | 202 | −13 | 3 | | 24–28 | 36–36 | 31–29 | — |

Source: EHF

| 11 February 2025; 18:45 | Montpellier Handball (France) | 31–27 | (Switzerland) HC Kriens-Luzern | FDI Stadium, Montpellier; Attendance: 2,701; Referees: Borge, Nygren (NOR) |
| 11 February 2025; 18:45 | Hesham 6 | (16–15) | Šipić 7 | FDI Stadium, Montpellier; Attendance: 2,701; Referees: Borge, Nygren (NOR) |
| 11 February 2025; 18:45 | 3× (suspension) | Report | 5× (suspension) | FDI Stadium, Montpellier; Attendance: 2,701; Referees: Borge, Nygren (NOR) |

| 11 February 2025; 18:45 | Fraikin BM Granollers (Spain) | 36–36 | (Denmark) GOG Håndbold | Palau d'Esports, Granollers; Attendance: 1,100; Referees: Leszczynski, Piechota (POL) |
| 11 February 2025; 18:45 | García Robledo 8 | (18–17) | Grøndahl 13 | Palau d'Esports, Granollers; Attendance: 1,100; Referees: Leszczynski, Piechota (POL) |
| 11 February 2025; 18:45 | 3× (suspension) | Report | 1× (yellow card) 3× (suspension) | Palau d'Esports, Granollers; Attendance: 1,100; Referees: Leszczynski, Piechota (POL) |

| 18 February 2025; 18:45 | HC Kriens-Luzern (Switzerland) | 43–42 | (Spain) Fraikin BM Granollers | Sursee Stadthalle, Sursee; Attendance: 1,650; Referees: Ivanović, Vujisi (MNE) |
| 18 February 2025; 18:45 | Langenick 11 | (26–22) | Castillo 10 | Sursee Stadthalle, Sursee; Attendance: 1,650; Referees: Ivanović, Vujisi (MNE) |
| 18 February 2025; 18:45 | 2× (suspension) | Report | 1× (yellow card) 2× (suspension) | Sursee Stadthalle, Sursee; Attendance: 1,650; Referees: Ivanović, Vujisi (MNE) |

| 18 February 2025; 18:45 | GOG Håndbold (Denmark) | 33–27 | (France) Montpellier Handball | Arena Svendborg, Svendborg; Attendance: 2,876; Referees: Andorka, Hucker (HUN) |
| 18 February 2025; 18:45 | Grøndahl 10 | (17–10) | Cikusa 8 | Arena Svendborg, Svendborg; Attendance: 2,876; Referees: Andorka, Hucker (HUN) |
| 18 February 2025; 18:45 | 1× (yellow card) 5× (suspension) | Report | 2× (suspension) | Arena Svendborg, Svendborg; Attendance: 2,876; Referees: Andorka, Hucker (HUN) |

| 25 February 2025; 20:45 | Montpellier Handball (France) | 30–28 | (Denmark) GOG Håndbold | FDI Stadium, Montpellier; Attendance: 3,000; Referees: Cindric, Gonzurek (CRO) |
| 25 February 2025; 20:45 | A. Lenne, Y. Lenne 5 | (17–14) | Tilsted 8 | FDI Stadium, Montpellier; Attendance: 3,000; Referees: Cindric, Gonzurek (CRO) |
| 25 February 2025; 20:45 | 2× (yellow card) 1× (suspension) | Report | 2× (yellow card) 2× (suspension) | FDI Stadium, Montpellier; Attendance: 3,000; Referees: Cindric, Gonzurek (CRO) |

| 25 February 2025; 20:45 | Fraikin BM Granollers (Spain) | 31–29 | (Switzerland) HC Kriens-Luzern | Palau d'Esports, Granollers; Attendance: 1,115; Referees: Mitrevski, Todorovski (MKD) |
| 25 February 2025; 20:45 | Romero 7 | (17–14) | Šipić 8 | Palau d'Esports, Granollers; Attendance: 1,115; Referees: Mitrevski, Todorovski (MKD) |
| 25 February 2025; 20:45 | 2× (yellow card) 3× (suspension) | Report | 2× (yellow card) | Palau d'Esports, Granollers; Attendance: 1,115; Referees: Mitrevski, Todorovski (MKD) |

| 4 March 2025; 18:45 | HC Kriens-Luzern (Switzerland) | 31–32 | (France) Montpellier Handball | Sursee Stadthalle, Sursee; Attendance: 2,000; Referees: Mandak, Rudinsky (SVK) |
| 4 March 2025; 18:45 | Sigrist, Orbović 7 | (15–15) | Karlsson 7 | Sursee Stadthalle, Sursee; Attendance: 2,000; Referees: Mandak, Rudinsky (SVK) |
| 4 March 2025; 18:45 | 1× (yellow card) 1× (suspension) | Report | 1× (yellow card) 2× (suspension) | Sursee Stadthalle, Sursee; Attendance: 2,000; Referees: Mandak, Rudinsky (SVK) |

| 4 March 2025; 18:45 | GOG Håndbold (Denmark) | 32–31 | (Spain) Fraikin BM Granollers | Arena Svendborg, Svendborg; Attendance: 3,416; Referees: R. Thiyagarajah, S. Thiyagarajah (GER) |
| 4 March 2025; 18:45 | N. Pedersen, Vilhelmsen 4 | (16–14) | Borbón 7 | Arena Svendborg, Svendborg; Attendance: 3,416; Referees: R. Thiyagarajah, S. Thiyagarajah (GER) |
| 4 March 2025; 18:45 | 1× (suspension) | Report | 4× (suspension) | Arena Svendborg, Svendborg; Attendance: 3,416; Referees: R. Thiyagarajah, S. Thiyagarajah (GER) |

=== Group II ===
| Pos | Team | Pld | W | D | L | GF | GA | GD | Pts | Qualification | BID | LIM | BEN | YST |
|---|---|---|---|---|---|---|---|---|---|---|---|---|---|---|
| 1 | (Spain) CD Bidasoa Irun | 6 | 4 | 0 | 2 | 188 | 177 | +11 | 8 (Note: CD Bidasoa Irun 66–62 Limoges Handball) | Quarterfinals | — | 35–30 | 28–27 | 35–32 |
| 2 | (France) Limoges Handball | 6 | 4 | 0 | 2 | 196 | 193 | +3 | 8 | Play Offs | 32–31 | — | 36–28 | 31–30 |
| 3 | (Portugal) SL Benfica | 6 | 3 | 0 | 3 | 194 | 193 | +1 | 6 | Play Offs | 33–30 | 37–31 | — | 36–31 |
| 4 | (Sweden) Ystads IF | 6 | 1 | 0 | 5 | 185 | 200 | −15 | 2 | | 23–29 | 32–36 | 37–33 | — |

Source: EHF
Notes:

| 11 February 2025; 18:45 | Ystads IF (Sweden) | 32–36 | (France) Limoges Handball | Ystad Arena, Ystad; Attendance: 728; Referees: Barysas, Petrusis (LTU) |
| 11 February 2025; 18:45 | Olsen 7 | (14–16) | Ivić 8 | Ystad Arena, Ystad; Attendance: 728; Referees: Barysas, Petrusis (LTU) |
| 11 February 2025; 18:45 | 5× (suspension) | Report | 3× (suspension) | Ystad Arena, Ystad; Attendance: 728; Referees: Barysas, Petrusis (LTU) |

| 11 February 2025; 20:45 | CD Bidasoa Irun (Spain) | 28–27 | (Portugal) SL Benfica | Pabellón Polideportivo Artaleku, Irun; Attendance: 1,702; Referees: Mandak, Rudinsky (SVK) |
| 11 February 2025; 20:45 | Cavero 6 | (13–15) | Rahmel 13 | Pabellón Polideportivo Artaleku, Irun; Attendance: 1,702; Referees: Mandak, Rudinsky (SVK) |
| 11 February 2025; 20:45 | 1× (yellow card) 6× (suspension) 1× (red card) | Report | 1× (yellow card) 8× (suspension) 1× (red card) | Pabellón Polideportivo Artaleku, Irun; Attendance: 1,702; Referees: Mandak, Rudinsky (SVK) |

| 18 February 2025; 17:45 | SL Benfica (Portugal) | 36–31 | (Sweden) Ystads IF | Pavilhão da Luz Nº 2, Lisbon; Attendance: 656; Referees: Stark, Ştefan (ROM) |
| 18 February 2025; 17:45 | Moreira 9 | (18–14) | Joelsson 6 | Pavilhão da Luz Nº 2, Lisbon; Attendance: 656; Referees: Stark, Ştefan (ROM) |
| 18 February 2025; 17:45 | 5× (suspension) 1× (red card) | Report | 1× (yellow card) 3× (suspension) | Pavilhão da Luz Nº 2, Lisbon; Attendance: 656; Referees: Stark, Ştefan (ROM) |

| 18 February 2025; 20:45 | Limoges Handball (France) | 32–31 | (Spain) CD Bidasoa Irun | Palais des Sports de Beaublanc, Limoges; Attendance: 3,254; Referees: Jović, Arnautović (BIH) |
| 18 February 2025; 20:45 | Ogando 7 | (15–17) | Salinas 7 | Palais des Sports de Beaublanc, Limoges; Attendance: 3,254; Referees: Jović, Arnautović (BIH) |
| 18 February 2025; 20:45 | 1× (yellow card) 4× (suspension) | Report | 1× (yellow card) 5× (suspension) | Palais des Sports de Beaublanc, Limoges; Attendance: 3,254; Referees: Jović, Arnautović (BIH) |

| 25 February 2025; 18:45 | Ystads IF (Sweden) | 37–33 | (Portugal) SL Benfica | Ystad Arena, Ystad; Attendance: 515; Referees: Horváth, Marton (HUN) |
| 25 February 2025; 18:45 | Olsen 7 | (17–16) | Rahmel 8 | Ystad Arena, Ystad; Attendance: 515; Referees: Horváth, Marton (HUN) |
| 25 February 2025; 18:45 | 1× (yellow card) 2× (suspension) | Report | 4× (suspension) | Ystad Arena, Ystad; Attendance: 515; Referees: Horváth, Marton (HUN) |

| 25 February 2025; 20:45 | CD Bidasoa Irun (Spain) | 35–30 | (France) Limoges Handball | Pabellón Polideportivo Artaleku, Irun; Attendance: 1,820; Referees: Bolic, Hurich (AUT) |
| 25 February 2025; 20:45 | Salinas 6 | (15–15) | Turchenko 7 | Pabellón Polideportivo Artaleku, Irun; Attendance: 1,820; Referees: Bolic, Hurich (AUT) |
| 25 February 2025; 20:45 | 4× (suspension) | Report | 1× (yellow card) 3× (suspension) | Pabellón Polideportivo Artaleku, Irun; Attendance: 1,820; Referees: Bolic, Hurich (AUT) |

| 4 March 2025; 19:45 | SL Benfica (Portugal) | 33–30 | (Spain) CD Bidasoa Irun | Pavilhão da Luz Nº 2, Lisbon; Attendance: 399; Referees: Mikelic, Paradina (CRO) |
| 4 March 2025; 19:45 | Rahmel, Hanusz 6 | (13–14) | Iribar 11 | Pavilhão da Luz Nº 2, Lisbon; Attendance: 399; Referees: Mikelic, Paradina (CRO) |
| 4 March 2025; 19:45 | 1× (yellow card) 4× (suspension) | Report | 2× (suspension) | Pavilhão da Luz Nº 2, Lisbon; Attendance: 399; Referees: Mikelic, Paradina (CRO) |

| 4 March 2025; 20:45 | Limoges Handball (France) | 31–30 | (Sweden) Ystads IF | Palais des Sports de Beaublanc, Limoges; Attendance: 3,108; Referees: Pukšič, Satler (SLO) |
| 4 March 2025; 20:45 | El-Deraa 7 | (15–13) | Olsen 11 | Palais des Sports de Beaublanc, Limoges; Attendance: 3,108; Referees: Pukšič, Satler (SLO) |
| 4 March 2025; 20:45 | 3× (suspension) | Report | 1× (suspension) | Palais des Sports de Beaublanc, Limoges; Attendance: 3,108; Referees: Pukšič, Satler (SLO) |

=== Group III ===
| Pos | Team | Pld | W | D | L | GF | GA | GD | Pts | Qualification | KIE | MEL | POR | VOJ |
|---|---|---|---|---|---|---|---|---|---|---|---|---|---|---|
| 1 | (Germany) THW Kiel | 6 | 5 | 1 | 0 | 197 | 165 | +32 | 11 | Quarterfinals | — | 35−24 | 32−22 | 37−35 |
| 2 | (Germany) MT Melsungen | 6 | 3 | 2 | 1 | 173 | 167 | +6 | 8 | Play Offs | 26−26 | — | 32−27 | 26−26 |
| 3 | (Portugal) FC Porto | 6 | 2 | 0 | 4 | 170 | 178 | −8 | 4 | Play Offs | 30−35 | 24−29 | — | 29−20 |
| 4 | (Serbia) RK Vojvodina | 6 | 0 | 1 | 5 | 168 | 198 | −30 | 1 | | 28–32 | 29−36 | 30−38 | — |

Source: EHF

| 11 February 2025; 20:45 | MT Melsungen (Germany) | 26–26 | (Germany) THW Kiel | Rothenbach-Halle, Kassel; Attendance: 3,289; Referees: Bozhinovski, Nachevski (MKD) |
| 11 February 2025; 20:45 | Mensing, Barrufet 6 | (14–13) | Johansson 8 | Rothenbach-Halle, Kassel; Attendance: 3,289; Referees: Bozhinovski, Nachevski (MKD) |
| 11 February 2025; 20:45 | 1× (suspension) | Report | 2× (suspension) | Rothenbach-Halle, Kassel; Attendance: 3,289; Referees: Bozhinovski, Nachevski (MKD) |

| 11 February 2025; 19:45 | FC Porto (Portugal) | 29–20 | (Serbia) RK Vojvodina | Dragão Arena, Porto; Attendance: 538; Referees: Šniurevičius, Grigalionis (LTU) |
| 11 February 2025; 19:45 | three players 5 | (14–9) | Silva, Kavčič 6 | Dragão Arena, Porto; Attendance: 538; Referees: Šniurevičius, Grigalionis (LTU) |
| 11 February 2025; 19:45 | 1× (suspension) | Report | 2× (suspension) | Dragão Arena, Porto; Attendance: 538; Referees: Šniurevičius, Grigalionis (LTU) |

| 18 February 2025; 20:45 | THW Kiel (Germany) | 32–22 | (Portugal) FC Porto | Wunderino Arena, Kiel; Attendance: 5,044; Referees: Carmaux, Mursch (FRA) |
| 18 February 2025; 20:45 | Ellefsen 6 | (14–12) | Gunnarsson 4 | Wunderino Arena, Kiel; Attendance: 5,044; Referees: Carmaux, Mursch (FRA) |
| 18 February 2025; 20:45 | 3× (suspension) | Report | 4× (suspension) | Wunderino Arena, Kiel; Attendance: 5,044; Referees: Carmaux, Mursch (FRA) |

| 18 February 2025; 20:45 | RK Vojvodina (Serbia) | 29–36 | (Germany) MT Melsungen | Sportska hala Slana Bara, Novi Sad; Attendance: 1,500; Referees: Fotakidis, Kinatzidis (GRE) |
| 18 February 2025; 20:45 | Jovanović 6 | (17–18) | Kastening 7 | Sportska hala Slana Bara, Novi Sad; Attendance: 1,500; Referees: Fotakidis, Kinatzidis (GRE) |
| 18 February 2025; 20:45 | 4× (suspension) | Report | 7× (suspension) | Sportska hala Slana Bara, Novi Sad; Attendance: 1,500; Referees: Fotakidis, Kinatzidis (GRE) |

| 25 February 2025; 20:45 | MT Melsungen (Germany) | 26–26 | (Serbia) RK Vojvodina | Rothenbach-Halle, Kassel; Attendance: 1,717; Referees: Panayides, Andreou (CYP) |
| 25 February 2025; 20:45 | Mensing 6 | (15–16) | Nafea 5 | Rothenbach-Halle, Kassel; Attendance: 1,717; Referees: Panayides, Andreou (CYP) |
| 25 February 2025; 20:45 | 1× (yellow card) 4× (suspension) | Report | 1× (yellow card) 5× (suspension) | Rothenbach-Halle, Kassel; Attendance: 1,717; Referees: Panayides, Andreou (CYP) |

| 25 February 2025; 19:45 | FC Porto (Portugal) | 30–35 | (Germany) THW Kiel | Dragão Arena, Porto; Attendance: 1,329; Referees: Leszczyński, Piechota (POL) |
| 25 February 2025; 19:45 | Gunnarsson, Salina 5 | (15–17) | Skipagøtu, Imre 7 | Dragão Arena, Porto; Attendance: 1,329; Referees: Leszczyński, Piechota (POL) |
| 25 February 2025; 19:45 | 1× (suspension) | Report | 2× (suspension) | Dragão Arena, Porto; Attendance: 1,329; Referees: Leszczyński, Piechota (POL) |

| 4 March 2025; 20:45 | THW Kiel (Germany) | 35–24 | (Germany) MT Melsungen | Wunderino Arena, Kiel; Attendance: 6,155; Referees: Álvarez, Bustamante (ESP) |
| 4 March 2025; 20:45 | Skipagøtu 9 | (20–13) | Enderleit 5 | Wunderino Arena, Kiel; Attendance: 6,155; Referees: Álvarez, Bustamante (ESP) |
| 4 March 2025; 20:45 | 1× (yellow card) 3× (suspension) | Report | 1× (yellow card) 3× (suspension) | Wunderino Arena, Kiel; Attendance: 6,155; Referees: Álvarez, Bustamante (ESP) |

| 4 March 2025; 20:45 | RK Vojvodina (Serbia) | 30–38 | (Portugal) FC Porto | Sportska hala Slana Bara, Novi Sad; Attendance: 1,950; Referees: Borge, Nygren (NOR) |
| 4 March 2025; 20:45 | Silva, Kavčič 6 | (14–20) | Oliveira 7 | Sportska hala Slana Bara, Novi Sad; Attendance: 1,950; Referees: Borge, Nygren (NOR) |
| 4 March 2025; 20:45 | 2× (yellow card) 2× (suspension) | Report | 4× (suspension) | Sportska hala Slana Bara, Novi Sad; Attendance: 1,950; Referees: Borge, Nygren (NOR) |

=== Group IV ===
| Pos | Team | Pld | W | D | L | GF | GA | GD | Pts | Qualification | FLE | FEN | GUM | TAT |
|---|---|---|---|---|---|---|---|---|---|---|---|---|---|---|
| 1 | (Germany) SG Flensburg-Handewitt | 6 | 4 | 2 | 0 | 220 | 186 | +34 | 10 | Quarterfinals | — | 34−34 | 32−30 | 44−27 |
| 2 | (France) Fenix Toulouse Handball | 6 | 3 | 2 | 1 | 194 | 191 | +3 | 8 | Play Offs | 35−35 | — | 31−30 | 35−28 |
| 3 | (Germany) VfL Gummersbach | 6 | 3 | 0 | 3 | 201 | 181 | +20 | 6 | Play Offs | 31−36 | 33−26 | — | 33−27 |
| 4 | (Hungary) MOL-Tatabánya KC | 6 | 0 | 0 | 6 | 171 | 228 | −57 | 0 | | 29−39 | 31−33 | 29−44 | — |

Source: EHF

| 11 February 2025; 18:45 | VfL Gummersbach (Germany) | 31–36 | (Germany) SG Flensburg-Handewitt | Schwalbe-Arena, Gummersbach; Attendance: 4,012; Referees: Vešović, Mitrović (MNE) |
| 11 February 2025; 18:45 | Köster 7 | (19–18) | Golla 10 | Schwalbe-Arena, Gummersbach; Attendance: 4,012; Referees: Vešović, Mitrović (MNE) |
| 11 February 2025; 18:45 | 3× (suspension) | Report | 5× (suspension) | Schwalbe-Arena, Gummersbach; Attendance: 4,012; Referees: Vešović, Mitrović (MNE) |

| 11 February 2025; 20:45 | Fenix Toulouse Handball (France) | 35–28 | (Hungary) MOL-Tatabánya KC | Palais des sports André-Brouat, Toulouse; Attendance: 1,600; Referees: D. Lončar, Z. Lončar (CRO) |
| 11 February 2025; 20:45 | Giraudeau 6 | (18–14) | Topic 7 | Palais des sports André-Brouat, Toulouse; Attendance: 1,600; Referees: D. Lončar, Z. Lončar (CRO) |
| 11 February 2025; 20:45 | 3× (suspension) 1× (red card) | Report | 5× (suspension) | Palais des sports André-Brouat, Toulouse; Attendance: 1,600; Referees: D. Lončar, Z. Lončar (CRO) |

| 18 February 2025; 18:45 | SG Flensburg-Handewitt (Germany) | 34–34 | (France) Fenix Toulouse Handball | Flens-Arena, Flensburg; Attendance: 3,020; Referees: Jerlecki, Labun (POL) |
| 18 February 2025; 18:45 | Pytlick 9 | (19–18) | Vieira 8 | Flens-Arena, Flensburg; Attendance: 3,020; Referees: Jerlecki, Labun (POL) |
| 18 February 2025; 18:45 | 1× (suspension) | Report | 4× (suspension) | Flens-Arena, Flensburg; Attendance: 3,020; Referees: Jerlecki, Labun (POL) |

| 18 February 2025; 18:45 | MOL-Tatabánya KC (Hungary) | 29–44 | (Germany) VfL Gummersbach | Tatabányai Multifunkcionális Sportcsarnok, Tatabánya; Attendance: 1,647; Referees: Antić, Jakovljević (SRB) |
| 18 February 2025; 18:45 | Przytuła 7 | (13–23) | Mahé 9 | Tatabányai Multifunkcionális Sportcsarnok, Tatabánya; Attendance: 1,647; Referees: Antić, Jakovljević (SRB) |
| 18 February 2025; 18:45 | 1× (yellow card) 5× (suspension) | Report | 1× (yellow card) 2× (suspension) | Tatabányai Multifunkcionális Sportcsarnok, Tatabánya; Attendance: 1,647; Referees: Antić, Jakovljević (SRB) |

| 25 February 2025; 18:45 | VfL Gummersbach (Germany) | 33–27 | (Hungary) MOL-Tatabánya KC | Schwalbe-Arena, Gummersbach; Attendance: 3,044; Referees: Pîrvu, Potîrniche (ROM) |
| 25 February 2025; 18:45 | Elliði 7 | (16–16) | Plaza Jiménez 6 | Schwalbe-Arena, Gummersbach; Attendance: 3,044; Referees: Pîrvu, Potîrniche (ROM) |
| 25 February 2025; 18:45 | 2× (suspension) | Report | 4× (suspension) | Schwalbe-Arena, Gummersbach; Attendance: 3,044; Referees: Pîrvu, Potîrniche (ROM) |

| 25 February 2025; 18:45 | Fenix Toulouse Handball (France) | 35–35 | (Germany) SG Flensburg-Handewitt | Palais des sports André-Brouat, Toulouse; Attendance: 3,000; Referees: Bozhinovski, Nachevski (MKD) |
| 25 February 2025; 18:45 | Ilić 10 | (17–19) | Jørgensen 10 | Palais des sports André-Brouat, Toulouse; Attendance: 3,000; Referees: Bozhinovski, Nachevski (MKD) |
| 25 February 2025; 18:45 | 1× (suspension) 1× (red card) | Report | 3× (suspension) | Palais des sports André-Brouat, Toulouse; Attendance: 3,000; Referees: Bozhinovski, Nachevski (MKD) |

| 4 March 2025; 18:45 | SG Flensburg-Handewitt (Germany) | 32–30 | (Germany) VfL Gummersbach | Flens-Arena, Flensburg; Attendance: 4,935; Referees: Jović, Arnautović (BIH) |
| 4 March 2025; 18:45 | Jakobsen 8 | (16–16) | Schluroff 10 | Flens-Arena, Flensburg; Attendance: 4,935; Referees: Jović, Arnautović (BIH) |
| 4 March 2025; 18:45 | 3× (suspension) | Report | 2× (yellow card) 5× (suspension) | Flens-Arena, Flensburg; Attendance: 4,935; Referees: Jović, Arnautović (BIH) |

| 4 March 2025; 18:45 | MOL-Tatabánya KC (Hungary) | 31–33 | (France) Fenix Toulouse Handball | Tatabányai Multifunkcionális Sportcsarnok, Tatabánya; Attendance: 1,250; Referees: Hofer, Schmidhuber (AUT) |
| 4 March 2025; 18:45 | Plaza Jiménez 5 | (15–15) | Nyembo 7 | Tatabányai Multifunkcionális Sportcsarnok, Tatabánya; Attendance: 1,250; Referees: Hofer, Schmidhuber (AUT) |
| 4 March 2025; 18:45 | 1× (yellow card) 3× (suspension) | Report | 3× (suspension) | Tatabányai Multifunkcionális Sportcsarnok, Tatabánya; Attendance: 1,250; Referees: Hofer, Schmidhuber (AUT) |
