= 2024–25 EHF European League =

European club handball tournament

EHF European League
- 2024–25

Tournament information
- Sport: Handball
- Dates: 31 August 2024–25 May 2025
- Teams: Competition proper: 32; Total: 42 (from 19 countries)
- Website: ehfel.com

Final positions
- Champions: (Germany) SG Flensburg-Handewitt (3rd title)
- Runner-up: (France) Montpellier Handball

Tournament statistics
- Matches played: 148
- Goals scored: 10,081 (68.11 per match)
- MVP: (Denmark) Kevin Møller
- Top scorer(s): (Spain) Ian Barrufet (90 goals)

The 2024–25 EHF European League was the 44th season of Europe's secondary club handball tournament organised by European Handball Federation (EHF), and the 5th season since it was renamed from the EHF Cup to the EHF European League.

The defending champions were SG Flensburg-Handewitt, who won their third title after defeating French side Montpellier Handball in the final.

== Format ==
- Qualification Round: 20 teams will be drawn into 10 different home and away ties. The 10 winners will advance to the group stage.
- Group Stage: The 22 teams already qualified along with the 10 winners of the qualification round will be drawn into 8 groups of 4 teams each, where they will play in a double round-robin format. The top 2 teams in each group will progress to the main round. Teams from the same country can't be drawn into the same group.
- Main Round: The 16 group winners and runners-up will be placed in 4 groups of 4 teams each where they will play a single round-robin. The winners will advance directly to the quarterfinals, while 2nd and 3rd placed teams will qualify for the play-offs.
- Play-offs: The 2nd and 3rd placed teams from each group in the main round will play in 4 different home and away ties. The winners will progress to the quarterfinals.
- Quarter-finals: The main round group winners will face a play-off winner to determine who makes it to the European League finals.
- EL finals: They will be played in a Final 4 format similar to the Champions League.

== Rankings ==
The rankings are based on the performances of each club from a respective country from a three-year period.

- Associations 1–2 can have four clubs qualify.
- Associations 3–9 can have three clubs qualify.
- Associations 10–18 can have two clubs qualify.
- Associations below the top 18 are allowed to enter apply one club for a potential wildcard.

Rank	Association	Average points	Teams
1	Germany	147.67	4
2	Portugal	88.67	4
3	France	78.00	3
4	Spain	70.33	3
5	Poland	68.33	2
6	Croatia	67.67	3
7	Denmark	63.67	3
8	Switzerland	62.67	3
9	Sweden	55.00	3
10	Russia	48.50	0
11	North Macedonia	41.33	1
12	Hungary	31,67	1
13	Slovenia	31.33	2
14	Slovakia	27.67	1

Rank	Association	Average points	Teams
15	Austria	22.00	0
16	Iceland	19.33	2
17	Romania	18.00	1
18	Ukraine	15.00	0
19	Greece	10.33	0
20	Finland	9.67	0
21	Turkey	8.00	0
22	Norway	7.33	1
23	Serbia	1.00	1
24	Belarus	1.00	0
25	Israel	0.33	0
26	Luxembourg	0.33	0
N/A	Bosnia and Herzegovina	0.00	1
N/A	Czech Republic	0.00	1
N/A	(N/A) Everyone else	0.00	0

== Qualified teams ==
The full list of teams qualified for each stage of the 2024–25 EHF European League was announced on 9 July 2024.

The labels in the parentheses show how each team qualified for the place of its starting round:

- EL: European League title holders
- EC: European Cup title holders
- CW: Cup winners
- CR: Cup runners-up
- 4th, 5th, etc.: League position of the previous season

Group stage
(Germany) SG Flensburg-Handewitt (3rd)^{EL}	(Portugal) FC Porto (2nd)	(France) Montpellier Handball (3rd)	(Croatia) RK Nexe (2nd)
(Denmark) GOG Håndbold (3rd, CW)	(Switzerland) Kadetten Schaffhausen (1st)	(Spain) CD Bidasoa Irun (2nd)	(Sweden) IK Sävehof (1st)
(Poland) Górnik Zabrze (3rd)	(Romania) CSM Constanța (2nd)	(Slovenia) RK Gorenje Velenje (1st)	(North Macedonia) Vardar 1961 (2nd)
(Hungary) MOL-Tatabánya KC (3rd)	(Iceland) FH Hafnarfjarðar (1st)	(Slovakia) HT Tatran Prešov (1st, CW)	(Germany) THW Kiel (4th)
(Portugal) SL Benfica (3rd)	(Croatia) MRK Sesvete (3rd, CR)	(France) Fenix Toulouse Handball (4th)	(Spain) Bathco Torrelavega (11th, CR)
(Poland) KGHM Chrobry Głogów (4th)	(Serbia) RK Vojvodina (1st)^{WC}		

Qualification round
(Germany) MT Melsungen (5th)	(Portugal) ABC Braga (4th)	(Denmark) Bjerringbro-Silkeborg (4th)	(Switzerland) HC Kriens-Luzern (2nd)
(Spain) Fraikin BM Granollers (3rd)	(Sweden) Ystads IF (2nd)	(Slovenia) RK Trimo Trebnje (2nd, CW)	(Iceland) Valur (3rd, CW)^{EC}
(Germany) VfL Gummersbach (6th)	(Portugal) Maritimo da Madeira Andebol SAD (5th)	(Switzerland) GC Amicitia Zürich (3rd)	(Sweden) IFK Kristianstad (3rd)
(France) Limoges Handball (5th)	(Denmark) Mors-Thy Håndbold (5th)	(Spain) Abanca Ademar León (5th)	(Croatia) RK Spačva Vinkovci (4th)
(Hungary) FTC-Green Collect (4th)	(Norway) Elverum Håndball (2nd)	(Bosnia and Herzegovina) RK Izviđač (1st)	(Czech Republic) HCB Karviná (1st)

- ^{WC} Accepted Wildcard

== Schedule ==
All draws were held at the EHF headquarters in Vienna, Austria.

Phase	Round	Draw date	Round date
Qualification round	First leg	16 July 2024	31 August–1 September 2024
Qualification round	Second leg	16 July 2024	6–8 September 2024
Group stage	Matchday 1	19 July 2024	8 October 2024
Group stage	Matchday 2	19 July 2024	15 October 2024
Group stage	Matchday 3	19 July 2024	22 October 2024
Group stage	Matchday 4	19 July 2024	29 October 2024
Group stage	Matchday 5	19 July 2024	19 November 2024
Group stage	Matchday 6	19 July 2024	26 November 2024
Main Round	Matchday 7	19 July 2024	11 February 2025
Main Round	Matchday 8	19 July 2024	18 February 2025
Main Round	Matchday 9	19 July 2024	25 February 2025
Main Round	Matchday 10	19 July 2024	4 March 2025
Play offs	First leg	no draw	25 March 2025
Play offs	Second leg	no draw	1 April 2025
Quarterfinals	First leg	no draw	22 April 2025
Quarterfinals	Second leg	no draw	29 April 2025
Final four	Semi-finals	TBD	24 May 2025
Final four	Final and Third place game	TBD	25 May 2025

== Draw ==
The draw took place on the at 11:00 CET in Vienna on 19 July 2024. The only restriction was that no clubs from the same country cannot be in the same group.

Pot 1	Pot 2	Pot 3	Pot 4
(Germany) SG Flensburg-Handewitt (Portugal) FC Porto (France) Montpellier Handball (Croatia) RK Nexe (Denmark) GOG Håndbold (Switzerland) Kadetten Schaffhausen (Spain) CD Bidasoa Irun (Sweden) IK Sävehof	(Poland) Górnik Zabrze (Romania) CSM Constanța (Slovenia) RK Gorenje Velenje (North Macedonia) Vardar 1961 (Hungary) MOL-Tatabánya KC (Iceland) FH Hafnarfjarðar (Slovakia) HT Tatran Prešov (Germany) THW Kiel	(Portugal) SL Benfica (Croatia) MRK Sesvete (France) Fenix Toulouse Handball (Spain) Bathco BM Torrelavega (Poland) KGHM Chrobry Głogów (N/A) Play Off Winner 1 (Note: The eventual team in this slot was Abanca Ademar León.) (N/A) Play Off Winner 2 (Note: The eventual team in this slot was MT Melsungen.) (N/A) Play Off Winner 3 (Note: The eventual team in this slot was Limoges Handball.)	(N/A) Play Off Winner 4 (Note: The eventual team in this slot was HC Kriens-Luzern.) (N/A) Play Off Winner 5 (Note: The eventual team in this slot was VfL Gummersbach.) (N/A) Play Off Winner 6 (Note: The eventual team in this slot was Valur.) (N/A) Play Off Winner 7 (Note: The eventual team in this slot was Fraikin BM Granollers.) (N/A) Play Off Winner 8 (Note: The eventual team in this slot was Bjerringbro-Silkeborg.) (N/A) Play Off Winner 9 (Note: The eventual team in this slot was Ystads IF.) (Serbia) RK Vojvodina (N/A) Special play off winner (Note: The eventual team in this slot was HCB Karviná.)

== Qualification round ==
The draw for the qualification round was conducted on 16 July 2024. The first legs will be held on 31 August to 1 September 2024 while the second legs will be held on 6–7 September 2024.

Seeding
Seeded	Unseeded
(Germany) MT Melsungen (Portugal) ABC Braga (Denmark) Bjerringbro-Silkeborg (Switzerland) HC Kriens-Luzern (Spain) Fraikin BM Granollers (Sweden) Ystads IF (Slovenia) RK Trimo Trebnje (Iceland) Valur (Germany) VfL Gummersbach	(Portugal) Maritimo da Madeira Andebol SAD (Switzerland) GC Amicitia Zürich (Sweden) IFK Kristianstad (France) Limoges Handball (Denmark) Mors-Thy Håndbold (Spain) Abanca Ademar León (Croatia) RK Spačva Vinkovci (Hungary) FTC-Green Collect (Norway) Elverum Håndball

Team 1	Agg.	Team 2	1st leg	2nd leg
ABC Braga (Portugal)	50–52	(Spain) Abanca Ademar León	23–21	27–31
MT Melsungen (Germany)	64–54	(Norway) Elverum Håndball	28–23	36–31
RK Trimo Trebnje (Slovenia)	56–63	(France) Limoges Handball	32–28	24–35
HC Kriens-Luzern (Switzerland)	71–69	(Switzerland) GC Amicitia Zürich	37–31	34–38
Mors-Thy Håndbold (Denmark)	52–74	(Germany) VfL Gummersbach	22–35	30–39
Valur (Iceland)	58–57	(Croatia) RK Spačva Vinkovci	34–25	24–32
IFK Kristianstad (Sweden)	57–62	(Spain) Fraikin BM Granollers	29–32	28–30
Bjerringbro-Silkeborg (Denmark)	77–61	(Hungary) FTC-Green Collect	45–27	32–34
Ystads IF (Sweden)	72–66	(Portugal) Maritimo da Madeira Andebol SAD	39–31	33–35

Special Qualification Play off

Unlike the other Play offs, the losers of this tie will drop down to the European Cup.

Team 1	Agg.	Team 2	1st leg	2nd leg
HCB Karviná (Czech Republic)	59–54	(Bosnia and Herzegovina) RK Izviđač	33–22	26–32

== Group stage ==
Location of teams of the 2024–25 EHF European League group stage
Brown: Group A; Red: Group B; Orange: Group C; Yellow: Group D;
Green: Group E; Blue: Group F; Purple: Group G; Pink: Group H

The draw for the group stage was conducted on 19 July 2024 at the EHF office in Vienna.

In the group stage, teams were ranked according to points (2 points for a win, 1 point for a draw, 0 points for a loss). After completion of the group stage, if two or more teams have scored the same number of points, the ranking will be determined as follows:

Tiebreakers
1. Highest number of points in matches between the teams directly involved;
2. Superior goal difference in matches between the teams directly involved;
3. Highest number of goals scored in matches between the teams directly involved;
4. Superior goal difference in all matches of the group;
5. Highest number of plus goals in all matches of the group;
6. Drawing of Lots

=== Group A ===
Pos	Team	Pld	W	D	L	GF	GA	GD	Pts	Qualification	LUZ	GOG	GOR	ADE
1	(Switzerland) HC Kriens-Luzern	6	5	0	1	196	181	+15	10	Main Round	—	32–30	30–25	34–30
2	(Denmark) GOG Håndbold	6	4	1	1	198	168	+30	9	Main Round	39–36	—	31–21	36–23
3	(Slovenia) RK Gorenje Velenje	6	1	1	4	160	186	−26	3		27–33	35–35	—	28–25
4	(Spain) Abanca Ademar León	6	1	0	5	161	180	−19	2		30–31	21–27	32–24	—

Source: EHF

=== Group B ===
Pos	Team	Pld	W	D	L	GF	GA	GD	Pts	Qualification	MON	GRA	SIL	ZAB
1	(France) Montpellier Handball	6	6	0	0	193	145	+48	12	Main Round	—	34–25	40–26	30–25
2	(Spain) Fraikin BM Granollers	6	3	0	3	194	186	+8	6	Main Round	24–28	—	36–27	41–30
3	(Denmark) Bjerringbro-Silkeborg	6	2	1	3	165	193	−28	5		22–34	35–32	—	30–26
4	(Poland) Górnik Zabrze	6	0	1	5	161	189	−28	1		23–27	32–36	25–25	—

Source: EHF

=== Group C ===
Pos	Team	Pld	W	D	L	GF	GA	GD	Pts	Qualification	BEN	LIM	KAD	TAT
1	(Portugal) SL Benfica	6	5	0	1	190	163	+27	10	Main Round	—	37–31	39–32	36–23
2	(France) Limoges Handball	6	4	0	2	198	170	+28	8	Main Round	36–28	—	27–31	31–24
3	(Switzerland) Kadetten Schaffhausen	6	3	0	3	195	187	+8	6		25–26	29–39	—	39–26
4	(Slovakia) HT Tatran Prešov	6	0	0	6	140	203	−63	0		16–24	21–34	30–39	—

Source: EHF

=== Group D ===
Pos	Team	Pld	W	D	L	GF	GA	GD	Pts	Qualification	BID	YST	GLO	CON
1	(Spain) CD Bidasoa Irun	6	4	1	1	199	176	+23	9	Main Round	—	35–32	33–33	37–25
2	(Sweden) Ystads IF	6	3	1	2	196	179	+17	7	Main Round	23–29	—	36–30	38–29
3	(Poland) KGHM Chrobry Głogów	6	2	1	3	187	201	−14	5		28–35	27–38	—	37–33
4	(Romania) CSM Constanța	6	1	1	4	177	203	−26	3		35–30	29–29	26–32	—

Source: EHF

=== Group E ===
Pos	Team	Pld	W	D	L	GF	GA	GD	Pts	Qualification	KIE	VOJ	TOR	NEX
1	(Germany) THW Kiel	6	6	0	0	200	174	+26	12	Main Round	—	37–35	32–27	31–28
2	(Serbia) RK Vojvodina	6	4	0	2	194	186	+8	8	Main Round	28–32	—	31–30	31–26
3	(Spain) Bathco BM Torrelavega	6	0	2	4	172	188	−16	2		30–33	26–33	—	32–32
4	(Croatia) RK Nexe	6	0	2	4	174	192	−18	2		26–35	35–36	27–27	—

Source: EHF

=== Group F ===
Pos	Team	Pld	W	D	L	GF	GA	GD	Pts	Qualification	MEL	POR	VAR	VAL
1	(Germany) MT Melsungen	6	5	0	1	194	150	+44	10	Main Round	—	32–27	34–18	36–21
2	(Portugal) FC Porto	6	3	1	2	178	163	+15	7	Main Round	24–29	—	37–24	37–29
3	(North Macedonia) RK Vardar	6	2	1	3	163	187	−24	5		32–30	22–26	—	33–26
4	(Iceland) Valur	6	0	2	4	165	200	−35	2		28–33	27–27	34–34	—

Source: EHF

=== Group G ===
Pos	Team	Pld	W	D	L	GF	GA	GD	Pts	Qualification	FLE	TAT	KAR	SES
1	(Germany) SG Flensburg-Handewitt	6	6	0	0	234	173	+61	12	Main Round	—	44–27	36–33	42–25
2	(Hungary) MOL-Tatabánya KC	6	3	1	2	174	193	−19	7	Main Round	29–39	—	28–27	28–25
3	(Czech Republic) HCB Karviná	6	1	1	4	177	203	−26	3		31–41	31–31	—	32–29
4	(Croatia) MRK Sesvete	6	1	0	5	172	188	−16	2		28–32	27–31	38–23	—

Source: EHF

=== Group H ===
Pos	Team	Pld	W	D	L	GF	GA	GD	Pts	Qualification	GUM	FEN	SAV	FH
1	(Germany) VfL Gummersbach	6	5	0	1	200	162	+38	10	Main Round	—	33–26	37–35	32–24
2	(France) Fenix Toulouse Handball	6	4	0	2	190	182	+8	8	Main Round	31–30	—	30–33	37–30
3	(Sweden) IK Sävehof	6	2	0	4	184	192	−8	4		25–28	31–37	—	30–26
4	(Iceland) FH Hafnarfjarðar	6	1	0	5	160	198	−38	2		21–40	25–29	34–30	—

Source: EHF

== Main round ==
In the Main Round, the remaining sixteen teams played in four groups of four. Teams were matched with two opponents they had not previously played against in the Group Stage, while points against the teams that advanced from the same group were carried over. At the end of the Main Round, the four group winners advanced to the Quarterfinals, while 2nd- and 3rd-placed teams from each group qualified for the Play-offs.

=== Group I ===
Pos	Team	Pld	W	D	L	GF	GA	GD	Pts	Qualification	MON	GOG	LUZ	GRA
1	(France) Montpellier Handball	6	5	0	1	182	168	+14	10	Quarterfinals	—	30–28	31–27	34–25
2	(Denmark) GOG Håndbold	6	3	1	2	198	192	+6	7	Play Offs	33–27	—	39–36	32–31
3	(Switzerland) HC Kriens-Luzern	6	2	0	4	198	205	−7	4	Play Offs	31–32	32–30	—	43–42
4	(Spain) Fraikin BM Granollers	6	1	1	4	189	202	−13	3		24–28	36–36	31–29	—

Source: EHF

=== Group II ===
Pos	Team	Pld	W	D	L	GF	GA	GD	Pts	Qualification	BID	LIM	BEN	YST
1	(Spain) CD Bidasoa Irun	6	4	0	2	188	177	+11	8 (Note: CD Bidasoa Irun 66–62 Limoges Handball)	Quarterfinals	—	35–30	28–27	35–32
2	(France) Limoges Handball	6	4	0	2	196	193	+3	8	Play Offs	32–31	—	36–28	31–30
3	(Portugal) SL Benfica	6	3	0	3	194	193	+1	6	Play Offs	33–30	37–31	—	36–31
4	(Sweden) Ystads IF	6	1	0	5	185	200	−15	2		23–29	32–36	37–33	—

Source: EHF

=== Group III ===
Pos	Team	Pld	W	D	L	GF	GA	GD	Pts	Qualification	KIE	MEL	POR	VOJ
1	(Germany) THW Kiel	6	5	1	0	197	165	+32	11	Quarterfinals	—	35−24	32−22	37−35
2	(Germany) MT Melsungen	6	3	2	1	173	167	+6	8	Play Offs	26−26	—	32−27	26−26
3	(Portugal) FC Porto	6	2	0	4	170	178	−8	4	Play Offs	30−35	24−29	—	29−20
4	(Serbia) RK Vojvodina	6	0	1	5	168	198	−30	1		28–32	29−36	30−38	—

Source: EHF

=== Group IV ===
Pos	Team	Pld	W	D	L	GF	GA	GD	Pts	Qualification	FLE	FEN	GUM	TAT
1	(Germany) SG Flensburg-Handewitt	6	4	2	0	220	186	+34	10	Quarterfinals	—	34−34	32−30	44−27
2	(France) Fenix Toulouse Handball	6	3	2	1	194	191	+3	8	Play Offs	35−35	—	31−30	35−28
3	(Germany) VfL Gummersbach	6	3	0	3	201	181	+20	6	Play Offs	31−36	33−26	—	33−27
4	(Hungary) MOL-Tatabánya KC	6	0	0	6	171	228	−57	0		29−39	31−33	29−44	—

Source: EHF

== Knockout stage ==
In the play-offs, eight teams ranked 2nd and 3rd in Main Round Groups I through IV played against each other in home-and-away matches.

The four winning teams advanced to the Quarterfinals, where they were joined by winners of Main Round Groups I through IV for another round of home-and-away matches.

The four Quarterfinal winners qualified for the Final Four tournament.

=== Play-offs ===
==== Overview ====
Team 1	Agg.	Team 2	1st leg	2nd leg
HC Kriens-Luzern (Switzerland)	64–65	(France) Limoges Handball	36–29	28–36
VfL Gummersbach (Germany)	54–55	(Germany) MT Melsungen	29–26	25–29
SL Benfica (Portugal)	64–65	(Denmark) GOG Håndbold	33–31	31–34
FC Porto (Portugal)	63–58	(France) Fenix Toulouse Handball	35–28	28–30

===== Matches =====
25 March 2025; 18:45 CET (UTC+1)	HC Kriens-Luzern (Switzerland)	36–29	(France) Limoges Handball	Sursee Stadthalle, Sursee; Attendance: 2,200; Referees: Kull, Tint (EST)
25 March 2025; 18:45 CET (UTC+1)	Sigrist 11	(17–14)	Turchenko, Monteiro 5	Sursee Stadthalle, Sursee; Attendance: 2,200; Referees: Kull, Tint (EST)
25 March 2025; 18:45 CET (UTC+1)	1× (yellow card) 2× (suspension)	Report	4× (suspension)	Sursee Stadthalle, Sursee; Attendance: 2,200; Referees: Kull, Tint (EST)

1 April 2025; 18:45 CET (UTC+1)	Limoges Handball (France)	36–28	(Switzerland) HC Kriens-Luzern	Palais des Sports de Beaublanc, Limoges; Attendance: 3,000; Referees: Bozhinovski, Nachevski (MKD)
1 April 2025; 18:45 CET (UTC+1)	Turchenko 10	(16–16)	Šipić 6	Palais des Sports de Beaublanc, Limoges; Attendance: 3,000; Referees: Bozhinovski, Nachevski (MKD)
1 April 2025; 18:45 CET (UTC+1)	1× (yellow card) 3× (suspension)	Report	2× (suspension)	Palais des Sports de Beaublanc, Limoges; Attendance: 3,000; Referees: Bozhinovski, Nachevski (MKD)

25 March 2025; 18:45 CET (UTC+1)	VfL Gummersbach (Germany)	29–26	(Germany) MT Melsungen	Schwalbe-Arena, Gummersbach; Attendance: 2,928; Referees: Bolić, Hurich (AUT)
25 March 2025; 18:45 CET (UTC+1)	Schluroff 10	(15–13)	Krištopāns 7	Schwalbe-Arena, Gummersbach; Attendance: 2,928; Referees: Bolić, Hurich (AUT)
25 March 2025; 18:45 CET (UTC+1)	6× (suspension)	Report	3× (suspension)	Schwalbe-Arena, Gummersbach; Attendance: 2,928; Referees: Bolić, Hurich (AUT)

1 April 2025; 20:45 CET (UTC+1)	MT Melsungen (Germany)	29–25	(Germany) VfL Gummersbach	Rothenbach-Halle, Kassel; Attendance: 2,851; Referees: Borge, Nygren (NOR)
1 April 2025; 20:45 CET (UTC+1)	Kastening 7	(14–13)	Vujović, Pregler 5	Rothenbach-Halle, Kassel; Attendance: 2,851; Referees: Borge, Nygren (NOR)
1 April 2025; 20:45 CET (UTC+1)	4× (suspension) 1× (red card)	Report	1× (yellow card) 6× (suspension)	Rothenbach-Halle, Kassel; Attendance: 2,851; Referees: Borge, Nygren (NOR)

25 March 2025; 20:45 WET (UTC+0)	SL Benfica (Portugal)	33–31	(Denmark) GOG Håndbold	Pavilhão da Luz Nº 2, Lisbon; Attendance: 482; Referees: Sekulić, Jovandić (SRB)
25 March 2025; 20:45 WET (UTC+0)	Izquierdo 7	(17–15)	Tilsted 8	Pavilhão da Luz Nº 2, Lisbon; Attendance: 482; Referees: Sekulić, Jovandić (SRB)
25 March 2025; 20:45 WET (UTC+0)	1× (yellow card) 3× (suspension)	Report	1× (yellow card) 6× (suspension) 1× (red card)	Pavilhão da Luz Nº 2, Lisbon; Attendance: 482; Referees: Sekulić, Jovandić (SRB)

1 April 2025; 18:45 CET (UTC+1)	GOG Håndbold (Denmark)	34–31	(Portugal) SL Benfica	Arena Svendborg, Svendborg; Attendance: 3,016; Referees: Ivanović, Vujisić (MNE)
1 April 2025; 18:45 CET (UTC+1)	Grøndahl 10	(15–15)	Grigoraș 7	Arena Svendborg, Svendborg; Attendance: 3,016; Referees: Ivanović, Vujisić (MNE)
1 April 2025; 18:45 CET (UTC+1)	2× (yellow card) 3× (suspension)	Report	3× (suspension) 1× (red card)	Arena Svendborg, Svendborg; Attendance: 3,016; Referees: Ivanović, Vujisić (MNE)

25 March 2025; 20:45 WET (UTC+0)	FC Porto (Portugal)	35–28	(France) Fenix Toulouse Handball	Dragão Arena, Porto; Attendance: 873; Referees: Vešović, Mitrović (MNE)
25 March 2025; 20:45 WET (UTC+0)	Veitia Valdés 8	(16–16)	Jarry 8	Dragão Arena, Porto; Attendance: 873; Referees: Vešović, Mitrović (MNE)
25 March 2025; 20:45 WET (UTC+0)	2× (yellow card) 3× (suspension)	Report	1× (yellow card) 1× (suspension)	Dragão Arena, Porto; Attendance: 873; Referees: Vešović, Mitrović (MNE)

1 April 2025; 20:45 CET (UTC+1)	Fenix Toulouse Handball (France)	30–28	(Portugal) FC Porto	Palais des Sports André-Brouat, Toulouse; Attendance: 4,000; Referees: Jović, Arnautović (BIH)
1 April 2025; 20:45 CET (UTC+1)	Feuchtmann 8	(12–12)	Veitia Valdés 5	Palais des Sports André-Brouat, Toulouse; Attendance: 4,000; Referees: Jović, Arnautović (BIH)
1 April 2025; 20:45 CET (UTC+1)		Report	1× (yellow card) 2× (suspension)	Palais des Sports André-Brouat, Toulouse; Attendance: 4,000; Referees: Jović, Arnautović (BIH)

=== Quarterfinals ===
==== Overview ====
Team 1	Agg.	Team 2	1st leg	2nd leg
FC Porto (Portugal)	61–65	(France) Montpellier Handball	29–30	32–35
MT Melsungen (Germany)	60–49	(Spain) CD Bidasoa Irun	28–27	32–22
Limoges Handball (France)	56–61	(Germany) THW Kiel	26–26	30–35
GOG Håndbold (Denmark)	55–64	(Germany) SG Flensburg-Handewitt	26–29	29–35

===== Matches =====
22 April 2025; 20:45 CEST (UTC+2)	FC Porto (Portugal)	29–30	(France) Montpellier Handball	Dragão Arena, Porto; Attendance: 1,262; Referees: Erdogan, Özdeniz (TUR)
22 April 2025; 20:45 CEST (UTC+2)	Veitia Valdés 6	(11–14)	Monte Dos Santos 8	Dragão Arena, Porto; Attendance: 1,262; Referees: Erdogan, Özdeniz (TUR)
22 April 2025; 20:45 CEST (UTC+2)	2× (suspension)	Report	1× (suspension)	Dragão Arena, Porto; Attendance: 1,262; Referees: Erdogan, Özdeniz (TUR)

29 April 2025; CET (UTC+1)	Montpellier Handball (France)	35–32	(Portugal) FC Porto	FDI Stadium, Montpellier; Attendance: 3,000; Referees: Thiyagarajah, Thiyagarajah (GER)
29 April 2025; CET (UTC+1)	Simonet 7	(18–15)	Caldeira Brandão 5	FDI Stadium, Montpellier; Attendance: 3,000; Referees: Thiyagarajah, Thiyagarajah (GER)
29 April 2025; CET (UTC+1)	1× (suspension)	Report	3× (suspension)	FDI Stadium, Montpellier; Attendance: 3,000; Referees: Thiyagarajah, Thiyagarajah (GER)

22 April 2025; 18:45	MT Melsungen (Germany)	28–27	(Spain) CD Bidasoa Irun	Rothenbach-Halle, Kassel; Attendance: 2,907; Referees: Leszczynski, Piechota (POL)
22 April 2025; 18:45	Barrufet 6	(15–13)	Nieto 6	Rothenbach-Halle, Kassel; Attendance: 2,907; Referees: Leszczynski, Piechota (POL)
22 April 2025; 18:45	1× (yellow card) 1× (suspension)	Report	1× (yellow card) 3× (suspension)	Rothenbach-Halle, Kassel; Attendance: 2,907; Referees: Leszczynski, Piechota (POL)

29 April 2025; CET (UTC+1)	CD Bidasoa Irun (Spain)	22–32	(Germany) MT Melsungen	Polideportivo Artaleku, Irún; Attendance: 2,000; Referees: Gasmi, Gasmi (FRA)
29 April 2025; CET (UTC+1)	three players 4	(8–15)	Barrufet 9	Polideportivo Artaleku, Irún; Attendance: 2,000; Referees: Gasmi, Gasmi (FRA)
29 April 2025; CET (UTC+1)	1× (yellow card) 2× (suspension)	Report	5× (suspension)	Polideportivo Artaleku, Irún; Attendance: 2,000; Referees: Gasmi, Gasmi (FRA)

22 April 2025; CET (UTC+1)	Limoges Handball (France)	26–26	(Germany) THW Kiel	Palais des Sports de Beaublanc, Limoges; Attendance: 4,798; Referees: Cindrić, Gonzurek (CRO)
22 April 2025; CET (UTC+1)	El-Deraa 6	(16–13)	Madsen, Imre 5	Palais des Sports de Beaublanc, Limoges; Attendance: 4,798; Referees: Cindrić, Gonzurek (CRO)
22 April 2025; CET (UTC+1)	1× (yellow card) 2× (suspension)	Report	1× (suspension)	Palais des Sports de Beaublanc, Limoges; Attendance: 4,798; Referees: Cindrić, Gonzurek (CRO)

29 April 2025; CET (UTC+1)	THW Kiel (Germany)	35–30	(France) Limoges Handball	Wunderino Arena, Kiel; Attendance: 6,294; Referees: Andorka, Hucker (HUN)
29 April 2025; CET (UTC+1)	Johansson 7	(16–15)	Yusuf 7	Wunderino Arena, Kiel; Attendance: 6,294; Referees: Andorka, Hucker (HUN)
29 April 2025; CET (UTC+1)	1× (yellow card) 5× (suspension)	Report	5× (suspension)	Wunderino Arena, Kiel; Attendance: 6,294; Referees: Andorka, Hucker (HUN)

22 April 2025; CET (UTC+1)	GOG Håndbold (Denmark)	26–29	(Germany) SG Flensburg-Handewitt	Arena Svendborg, Svendborg; Attendance: 3,579; Referees: Mandák, Rudinský (SVK)
22 April 2025; CET (UTC+1)	Grøndahl 7	(15–15)	Jørgensen, Jakobsen 7	Arena Svendborg, Svendborg; Attendance: 3,579; Referees: Mandák, Rudinský (SVK)
22 April 2025; CET (UTC+1)	1× (yellow card) 2× (suspension)	Report	1× (yellow card) 4× (suspension)	Arena Svendborg, Svendborg; Attendance: 3,579; Referees: Mandák, Rudinský (SVK)

29 April 2025; CET (UTC+1)	SG Flensburg-Handewitt (Germany)	35–29	(Denmark) GOG Håndbold	GP JOULE Arena, Flensburg; Attendance: 5,250; Referees: Mikelič, Paradina (CRO)
29 April 2025; CET (UTC+1)	Møller 9	(17–12)	Grøndahl 8	GP JOULE Arena, Flensburg; Attendance: 5,250; Referees: Mikelič, Paradina (CRO)
29 April 2025; CET (UTC+1)	1× (yellow card) 3× (suspension)	Report	1× (yellow card) 3× (suspension) 1× (red card)	GP JOULE Arena, Flensburg; Attendance: 5,250; Referees: Mikelič, Paradina (CRO)

== Final Four ==
The Final Four tournament was held at the Barclays Arena in Hamburg, Germany.

=== Bracket ===
Semi-finals
24 May
(Germany) THW Kiel	31
(France) Montpellier Handball	32
24 May
(Germany) MT Melsungen	34
(Germany) SG Flensburg-Handewitt	35

Final
25 May
(France) Montpellier Handball	25
(Germany) SG Flensburg-Handewitt	32
Third place
25 May
(Germany) THW Kiel	37
(Germany) MT Melsungen	31

=== Semifinals ===
24 May 2025; 15:00	MT Melsungen (Germany)	34–35	(Germany) SG Flensburg-Handewitt	Barclays Arena, Hamburg; Attendance: 11,000; Referees: Erdogan, Özdeniz (TUR)
24 May 2025; 15:00	Kastening 8	(15−16)	Jakobsen 9	Barclays Arena, Hamburg; Attendance: 11,000; Referees: Erdogan, Özdeniz (TUR)
24 May 2025; 15:00	2× (suspension)	Report	4× (suspension)	Barclays Arena, Hamburg; Attendance: 11,000; Referees: Erdogan, Özdeniz (TUR)

24 May 2025; 18:00	THW Kiel (Germany)	31–32	(France) Montpellier Handball	Barclays Arena, Hamburg; Attendance: 11,000; Referees: Pavicevic, Raznatovic (MNE)
24 May 2025; 18:00	Johansson, Zerbe 7	(17−16)	Karlsson 8	Barclays Arena, Hamburg; Attendance: 11,000; Referees: Pavicevic, Raznatovic (MNE)
24 May 2025; 18:00	2× (suspension)	Report	1× (yellow card) 2× (suspension)	Barclays Arena, Hamburg; Attendance: 11,000; Referees: Pavicevic, Raznatovic (MNE)

=== Third place game ===
25 May 2025; 15:00	THW Kiel (Germany)	37–31	(Germany) MT Melsungen	Barclays Arena, Hamburg; Attendance: 12,000; Referees: Andorka, Hucker (HUN)
25 May 2025; 15:00	Madsen 12	(18−18)	Drosten 6	Barclays Arena, Hamburg; Attendance: 12,000; Referees: Andorka, Hucker (HUN)
25 May 2025; 15:00	1× (yellow card) 2× (suspension) 1× (red card)	Report	1× (yellow card) 2× (suspension) 1× (red card)	Barclays Arena, Hamburg; Attendance: 12,000; Referees: Andorka, Hucker (HUN)

=== Final ===
25 May 2025; 18:00	Montpellier Handball (France)	25–32	(Germany) SG Flensburg-Handewitt	Barclays Arena, Hamburg; Attendance: 12,000; Referees: A. Konjicanin, D. Konjicanin (BIH)
25 May 2025; 18:00	Monte 6	(13−19)	Jørgensen 10	Barclays Arena, Hamburg; Attendance: 12,000; Referees: A. Konjicanin, D. Konjicanin (BIH)
25 May 2025; 18:00	1× (suspension)	Report	1× (yellow card) 1× (suspension)	Barclays Arena, Hamburg; Attendance: 12,000; Referees: A. Konjicanin, D. Konjicanin (BIH)

== Top goalscorers ==
Rank	Player	Club	Goals
1	(Spain) Ian Barrufet	(Germany) MT Melsungen	90
2	(Ukraine) Ihor Turchenko	(France) Limoges Handball	89
3	(Switzerland) Luca Sigrist	(Switzerland) HC Kriens-Luzern	87
4	(Norway) Tobias Grøndahl	(Denmark) GOG Håndbold	79
5	(Croatia) Marin Šipić	(Switzerland) HC Kriens-Luzern	78
6	(Egypt) Seif El-Deraa	(France) Limoges Handball	75
7	(Germany) Miro Schluroff	(Germany) VfL Gummersbach	74
8	(Spain) Antonio García	(Spain) Fraikin BM Granollers	71
9	(Denmark) Emil Madsen	(Germany) THW Kiel	67
10	(Denmark) Kristian Olsen	(Sweden) Ystads IF	65

== See also ==
- 2024–25 EHF Champions League
- 2024–25 EHF European Cup
- 2024–25 Women's EHF Champions League
- 2024–25 Women's EHF European League
- 2024–25 Women's EHF European Cup
