= 2024–25 EHF European League qualification round =

Handball tournament qualifier

EHF European League qualification round
- 2024–25

Tournament information
- Sport: Handball
- Date: 31 August – 7 September 2024
- Teams: 20 (from 14 countries)

Tournament statistics
- Matches played: 20

The 2024–25 EHF European League qualification round decided the last ten qualifiers for the European League group stage.

== Format ==
Twenty teams were split into ten play offs. While eighteen teams took part in the normal play offs, two clubs were pre-seeded to play against each other in special play off. The winners of the special play off would reach the group stage but unlike the other teams who are immediately eliminated, the special play off loser drop downs to the 2024–25 EHF European Cup. The play offs were held in a home and away format. Whoever has the highest score on aggregate won the tie and secured a place in the group stage.

== Teams ==
Location of teams of the 2024–25 EHF European League Qualification Round.

Teams
(Bosnia and Herzegovina) RK Izviđač	(Croatia) RK Spačva Vinkovci
(Czech Republic) HCB Karviná	(Denmark) Bjerringbro-Silkeborg
(Denmark) Mors-Thy Håndbold	(France) Limoges Handball
(Germany) MT Melsungen	(Germany) VfL Gummersbach
(Hungary) FTC-Green Collect	(Iceland) Valur
(Norway) Elverum Håndball	(Portugal) ABC Braga
(Portugal) Maritimo da Madeira Andebol SAD	(Slovenia) RK Trimo Trebnje
(Spain) Fraikin BM Granollers	(Spain) Abanca Ademar León
(Sweden) Ystads IF	(Sweden) IFK Kristianstad
(Switzerland) HC Kriens-Luzern	(Switzerland) GC Amicitia Zürich

Location of teams in 2024–25 EHF European League Qualification Round (Madeira)

== Draw ==
The draw for the qualification round was conducted on 16 July 2024 in Vienna, Austria. The first legs will be held on 31 August to 1 September 2024 while the second legs will be held on 6–8 September 2024. The bold text means which teams advanced.

Seeding
Seeded	Unseeded
(Germany) **MT Melsungen** (Portugal) ABC Braga (Denmark) **Bjerringbro-Silkeborg** (Switzerland) **HC Kriens-Luzern** (Spain) **Fraikin BM Granollers** (Sweden) **Ystads IF** (Slovenia) RK Trimo Trebnje (Iceland) **Valur** (Germany) **VfL Gummersbach**	(Portugal) Maritimo da Madeira Andebol SAD (Switzerland) GC Amicitia Zürich (Sweden) IFK Kristianstad (France) **Limoges Handball** (Denmark) Mors-Thy Håndbold (Spain) **Abanca Ademar León** (Croatia) RK Spačva Vinkovci (Hungary) FTC-Green Collect (Norway) Elverum Håndball

== Scores ==
Team 1	Agg.	Team 2	1st leg	2nd leg
ABC Braga (Portugal)	50–52	(Spain) **Abanca Ademar León**	23–21	27–31
**MT Melsungen** (Germany)	64–54	(Norway) Elverum Håndball	28–23	36–31
RK Trimo Trebnje (Slovenia)	56–63	(France) **Limoges Handball**	32–28	24–35
**HC Kriens-Luzern** (Switzerland)	71–69	(Switzerland) GC Amicitia Zürich	37–31	34–38
Mors-Thy Håndbold (Denmark)	52–74	(Germany) **VfL Gummersbach**	22–35	30–39
**Valur** (Iceland)	58–57	(Croatia) RK Spačva Vinkovci	34–25	24–32
IFK Kristianstad (Sweden)	57–62	(Spain) **Fraikin BM Granollers**	29–32	28–30
**Bjerringbro-Silkeborg** (Denmark)	77–61	(Hungary) FTC-Green Collect	45–27	32–34
**Ystads IF** (Sweden)	72–66	(Portugal) Maritimo da Madeira Andebol SAD	39–31	33–35

=== Matches ===
31 August 2024; 18:00	**ABC Braga (Portugal)**	**23–21**	**(Spain) Abanca Ademar León**	Pavilhão Flávio Sá Leite, Braga; Attendance: 650; Referees: Loncar, Loncar (CRO)
31 August 2024; 18:00	Sousa 7	(14–10)	Álvarez Dominguez 10	Pavilhão Flávio Sá Leite, Braga; Attendance: 650; Referees: Loncar, Loncar (CRO)
31 August 2024; 18:00	2× (yellow card) 8× (suspension)	Report	3× (suspension) 1× (red card)	Pavilhão Flávio Sá Leite, Braga; Attendance: 650; Referees: Loncar, Loncar (CRO)

8 September 2024; 20:00	**Abanca Ademar León (Spain)**	**31–27**	**(Portugal) ABC Braga**	Palacio de los Deportes de León, León; Attendance: 3,752; Referees: Horváth, Marton (HUN)
8 September 2024; 20:00	Arce 11	(15–12)	José 9	Palacio de los Deportes de León, León; Attendance: 3,752; Referees: Horváth, Marton (HUN)
8 September 2024; 20:00	1× (yellow card) 4× (suspension)	Report	8× (suspension) 1× (red card)	Palacio de los Deportes de León, León; Attendance: 3,752; Referees: Horváth, Marton (HUN)

Abanca Ademar León won 52–50 on aggregate.

31 August 2024; 18:30	**MT Melsungen (Germany)**	**28–23**	**(Norway) Elverum Håndball**	Rothenbach-Halle, Kassel; Attendance: 2,016; Referees: Ivanovic, Vujisic (MNE)
31 August 2024; 18:30	Balenciaga, Torrebejano 6	(13–12)	three players 5	Rothenbach-Halle, Kassel; Attendance: 2,016; Referees: Ivanovic, Vujisic (MNE)
31 August 2024; 18:30	7× (suspension)	Report	2× (yellow card) 5× (suspension)	Rothenbach-Halle, Kassel; Attendance: 2,016; Referees: Ivanovic, Vujisic (MNE)

7 September 2024; 17:00	**Elverum Håndball (Norway)**	**31–36**	**(Germany) MT Melsungen**	Terningen Arena, Elverum; Attendance: 1,611; Referees: Petursson, Thrastarson (ISL)
7 September 2024; 17:00	three players 6	(16–17)	Moraes 7	Terningen Arena, Elverum; Attendance: 1,611; Referees: Petursson, Thrastarson (ISL)
7 September 2024; 17:00	1× (yellow card) 2× (suspension)	Report	5× (suspension)	Terningen Arena, Elverum; Attendance: 1,611; Referees: Petursson, Thrastarson (ISL)

MT Melsungen won 64–54 on aggregate.

31 August 2024; 19:30	**RK Trimo Trebnje (Slovenia)**	**32–28**	**(France) Limoges Handball**	Dvorana OS Trebnje, Trebnje; Attendance: 700; Referees: Stark, Stefan (ROU)
31 August 2024; 19:30	Višček 7	(16–10)	Turtschenko, El-Deraa 5	Dvorana OS Trebnje, Trebnje; Attendance: 700; Referees: Stark, Stefan (ROU)
31 August 2024; 19:30	1× (yellow card) 2× (suspension)	Report	5× (suspension)	Dvorana OS Trebnje, Trebnje; Attendance: 700; Referees: Stark, Stefan (ROU)

7 September 2024; 19:00	**Limoges Handball (France)**	**35–24**	**(Slovenia) RK Trimo Trebnje**	Palais des Sports de Beaublanc, Limoges; Attendance: 3,647; Referees: Kull, Tint (EST)
7 September 2024; 19:00	Ogando 6	(17–11)	Krešic 5	Palais des Sports de Beaublanc, Limoges; Attendance: 3,647; Referees: Kull, Tint (EST)
7 September 2024; 19:00	4× (suspension)	Report	4× (suspension)	Palais des Sports de Beaublanc, Limoges; Attendance: 3,647; Referees: Kull, Tint (EST)

Limoges Handball won 63–56 on aggregate.

31 August 2024; 18:00	**HC Kriens-Luzern (Switzerland)**	**37–31**	**(Switzerland) GC Amicitia Zürich**	Krauerhalle, Kriens; Attendance: 657; Referees: Weijmans, Wolbertus (NED)
31 August 2024; 18:00	Sigrist, Steenaerts 9	(19–18)	Popovski, Grau 6	Krauerhalle, Kriens; Attendance: 657; Referees: Weijmans, Wolbertus (NED)
31 August 2024; 18:00	4× (yellow card) 4× (suspension)	Report	1× (yellow card) 2× (suspension)	Krauerhalle, Kriens; Attendance: 657; Referees: Weijmans, Wolbertus (NED)

7 September 2024; 18:00	**GC Amicitia Zürich (Switzerland)**	**38–34**	**(Switzerland) HC Kriens-Luzern**	Saalsporthalle, Zurich; Attendance: 300; Referees: Sekulic, Jovandic (SRB)
7 September 2024; 18:00	Popovski 6	(16–18)	Sigrist 9	Saalsporthalle, Zurich; Attendance: 300; Referees: Sekulic, Jovandic (SRB)
7 September 2024; 18:00	6× (suspension)	Report	3× (suspension)	Saalsporthalle, Zurich; Attendance: 300; Referees: Sekulic, Jovandic (SRB)

HC Kriens-Luzern won 71–69 on aggregate.

31 August 2024; 16:00	**Mors-Thy Håndbold (Denmark)**	**22–35**	**(Germany) VfL Gummersbach**	Thy Hallerne, Thisted; Attendance: 790; Referees: Mikelic, Paradina (CRO)
31 August 2024; 16:00	Sørensen 4	(10–17)	Köster 6	Thy Hallerne, Thisted; Attendance: 790; Referees: Mikelic, Paradina (CRO)
31 August 2024; 16:00	1× (yellow card) 5× (suspension)	Report	1× (yellow card) 1× (suspension)	Thy Hallerne, Thisted; Attendance: 790; Referees: Mikelic, Paradina (CRO)

8 September 2024; 16:30	**VfL Gummersbach (Germany)**	**39–30**	**(Denmark) Mors-Thy Håndbold**	Schwalbe-Arena, Gummersbach; Attendance: 3,834; Referees: Jovic, Arnautovic (BIH)
8 September 2024; 16:30	Teitur 7	(20–16)	Sørensen 6	Schwalbe-Arena, Gummersbach; Attendance: 3,834; Referees: Jovic, Arnautovic (BIH)
8 September 2024; 16:30	2× (suspension)	Report	4× (suspension)	Schwalbe-Arena, Gummersbach; Attendance: 3,834; Referees: Jovic, Arnautovic (BIH)

VfL Gummersbach won 74–52 on aggregate.

31 August 2024; 19:30	**Valur (Iceland)**	**34–25**	**(Croatia) RK Spačva Vinkovci**	N1 höllin, Reykjavík; Attendance: 338; Referees: Barysas, Petrusis (LTU)
31 August 2024; 19:30	í Selvindi 7	(13–16)	Maroš 7	N1 höllin, Reykjavík; Attendance: 338; Referees: Barysas, Petrusis (LTU)
31 August 2024; 19:30	5× (suspension)	Report	1× (yellow card) 5× (suspension)	N1 höllin, Reykjavík; Attendance: 338; Referees: Barysas, Petrusis (LTU)

7 September 2024; 19:00	**RK Spačva Vinkovci (Croatia)**	**32–24**	**(Iceland) Valur**	Sportska Dvorana Bartol Kasic, Vinkovci; Attendance: 500; Referees: Cipov, Klus (SVK)
7 September 2024; 19:00	Maroš 9	(19–10)	í Selvindi 7	Sportska Dvorana Bartol Kasic, Vinkovci; Attendance: 500; Referees: Cipov, Klus (SVK)
7 September 2024; 19:00	4× (suspension) 1× (red card)	Report	6× (suspension)	Sportska Dvorana Bartol Kasic, Vinkovci; Attendance: 500; Referees: Cipov, Klus (SVK)

Valur won 58–57 on aggregate.

31 August 2024; 15:00	**IFK Kristianstad (Sweden)**	**29–32**	**(Spain) Fraikin BM Granollers**	Kristianstad Arena, Kristianstad; Attendance: 1,517; Referees: Mitrevski, Todorovski (MKD)
31 August 2024; 15:00	Månsson 7	(13–15)	García Robledo 8	Kristianstad Arena, Kristianstad; Attendance: 1,517; Referees: Mitrevski, Todorovski (MKD)
31 August 2024; 15:00	1× (yellow card) 2× (suspension)	Report	2× (yellow card) 3× (suspension)	Kristianstad Arena, Kristianstad; Attendance: 1,517; Referees: Mitrevski, Todorovski (MKD)

7 September 2024; 17:00	**Fraikin BM Granollers (Spain)**	**30–28**	**(Sweden) IFK Kristianstad**	Palau d'Esports de Granollers, Granollers; Attendance: 2,000; Referees: Vesovic, Mitrovic (MNE)
7 September 2024; 17:00	García Robledo 8	(15–15)	Månsson 7	Palau d'Esports de Granollers, Granollers; Attendance: 2,000; Referees: Vesovic, Mitrovic (MNE)
7 September 2024; 17:00	6× (suspension) 1× (red card)	Report	1× (yellow card) 5× (suspension)	Palau d'Esports de Granollers, Granollers; Attendance: 2,000; Referees: Vesovic, Mitrovic (MNE)

Fraikin BM Granollers won 62–57 on aggregate.

31 August 2024; 14:00	**Bjerringbro-Silkeborg (Denmark)**	**45–27**	**(Hungary) FTC-Green Collect**	Jysk Arena, Silkeborg; Attendance: 1,512; Referees: Alvarez Mata, Bustamante Lopez (ESP)
31 August 2024; 14:00	Læsø 11	(22–14)	Lékai, Ónodi-Jánoskúti 4	Jysk Arena, Silkeborg; Attendance: 1,512; Referees: Alvarez Mata, Bustamante Lopez (ESP)
31 August 2024; 14:00	1× (yellow card) 3× (suspension)	Report	2× (suspension)	Jysk Arena, Silkeborg; Attendance: 1,512; Referees: Alvarez Mata, Bustamante Lopez (ESP)

8 September 2024; 18:00	**FTC-Green Collect (Hungary)**	**34–32**	**(Denmark) Bjerringbro-Silkeborg**	Elek Gyula Aréna, Budapest; Attendance: 500; Referees: Bolic, Hurich (AUT)
8 September 2024; 18:00	M. Győri 9	(16–18)	Læsø 11	Elek Gyula Aréna, Budapest; Attendance: 500; Referees: Bolic, Hurich (AUT)
8 September 2024; 18:00	3× (suspension)	Report	4× (suspension)	Elek Gyula Aréna, Budapest; Attendance: 500; Referees: Bolic, Hurich (AUT)

Bjerringbro-Silkeborg won 77–61 on aggregate.

31 August 2024; 16:00	**Ystads IF (Sweden)**	**39–31**	**(Portugal) Maritimo da Madeira Andebol SAD**	Ystad Arena, Ystad; Attendance: 724; Referees: Bozhinovski, Nachevski (MKD)
31 August 2024; 16:00	Fernebrand 11	(16–15)	Pina 9	Ystad Arena, Ystad; Attendance: 724; Referees: Bozhinovski, Nachevski (MKD)
31 August 2024; 16:00	2× (suspension)	Report	2× (suspension)	Ystad Arena, Ystad; Attendance: 724; Referees: Bozhinovski, Nachevski (MKD)

6 September 2024; 19:00	**Maritimo da Madeira Andebol SAD (Portugal)**	**35–33**	**(Sweden) Ystads IF**	Pavilhao do Maritimo, Madeira; Attendance: 350; Referees: Mandak, Rudinsky (SVK)
6 September 2024; 19:00	Pina 12	(15–16)	Ekberg 10	Pavilhao do Maritimo, Madeira; Attendance: 350; Referees: Mandak, Rudinsky (SVK)
6 September 2024; 19:00	3× (suspension)	Report	4× (suspension)	Pavilhao do Maritimo, Madeira; Attendance: 350; Referees: Mandak, Rudinsky (SVK)

Ystads IF won 72–66 on aggregate.

=== Special Qualification Play off ===
Unlike the other Play offs, the losers of this tie will drop down to the European Cup.

Team 1	Agg.	Team 2	1st leg	2nd leg
**HCB Karviná** (Czech Republic)	59–54	(Bosnia and Herzegovina) RK Izviđač	33–22	26–32

1 September 2024; 17:00	**HCB Karviná (Czech Republic)**	**33–22**	**(Bosnia and Herzegovina) RK Izviđač**	Sportovni hala házené STARS, Karviná; Attendance: 1,300; Referees: Leszczynski, Piechota (POL)
1 September 2024; 17:00	Patzel 9	(18–12)	three players 4	Sportovni hala házené STARS, Karviná; Attendance: 1,300; Referees: Leszczynski, Piechota (POL)
1 September 2024; 17:00	1× (yellow card) 5× (suspension)	Report	1× (yellow card) 4× (suspension)	Sportovni hala házené STARS, Karviná; Attendance: 1,300; Referees: Leszczynski, Piechota (POL)

7 September 2024; 19:00	**RK Izviđač (Bosnia and Herzegovina)**	**32–26**	**(Czech Republic) HCB Karviná**	Sportska Dvorana Ljubuski, Ljubuški; Attendance: 1,000; Referees: Pirvu, Potirniche (ROU)
7 September 2024; 19:00	Odak 10	(19–13)	Patzel, Solák 5	Sportska Dvorana Ljubuski, Ljubuški; Attendance: 1,000; Referees: Pirvu, Potirniche (ROU)
7 September 2024; 19:00	1× (yellow card) 7× (suspension) 1× (red card)	Report	4× (suspension)	Sportska Dvorana Ljubuski, Ljubuški; Attendance: 1,000; Referees: Pirvu, Potirniche (ROU)

HCB Karviná won 59–54 on aggregate.

== See also ==
- 2024–25 EHF Champions League
- 2024–25 EHF European League
- 2024–25 EHF European Cup
- 2024–25 Women's EHF Champions League
- 2024–25 Women's EHF European League
- 2024–25 Women's EHF European Cup
