= 2023–24 LNH Division 1 =

LNH Division 1
- Season: 2023-24
- Dates: 7 September 2023 – 31 May 2024
- Champions: Paris Saint-Germain; 11th title
- Relegated: Saran Loiret Handball; Dijon Métropole Handball
- Champions League: Paris Saint-Germain; HBC Nantes
- European League: Montpellier Handball; Fenix Toulouse; Limoges Handball
- Matches played: 240
- Goals scored: 15,029 (62.62 per match)
- Top goalscorer: Kamil Syprzak (220 goals)

The 2023–24 LNH Division 1, also known as Liqui Moly Starligue for sponsorship reasons, was the 72nd season of the LNH Division 1, France's premier handball league. The season began on 7 September 2023 and ended on 31 May 2024.

== Teams ==
2023-24 Starligue teams

=== Team changes ===
Promoted from 2022–23 LNH Division 2	Relegated from 2022–23 LNH Division 1
Saran Loiret Handball; Dijon Métropole Handball	Istres Provence Handball; Sélestat Alsace Handball

=== Stadiums ===
Team	City	Venue	Capacity
C' Chartres MHB	Chartres	Halle Jean-Cochet	1,200
Cesson Rennes MHB	Cesson-Sévigné	Glaz Arena	4,500
Chambéry SMB HB	Chambéry	Le Phare	4,500
Dijon Métropole Handball	Dijon	Palais des Sports Jean-Michel Geoffroy	4,147
Dunkerque HGL	Dunkerque	Stade des Flandres	2,400
Fenix Toulouse	Toulouse	Palais des Sports André-Brouat	4,397
HBC Nantes	Nantes	H Arena	5,500
Limoges Handball	Limoges	Palais des Sports de Beaublanc	5,516
Montpellier Handball	Montpellier	FDI Stadium	3,000
Paris Saint-Germain	Paris	Stade Pierre de Coubertin	3,400
Pays d'Aix UC	Aix-en-Provence	Arena du Pays d'Aix	6,004
Saint-Raphaël VHB	Saint-Raphaël	Palais des sports J-F Krakowski	2,500
Saran Loiret Handball	Saran	Halle des Sports Jacques Mazzuca	1,440
USAM Nîmes	Nîmes	Le Parnasse	4,191
US Créteil	Créteil	Palais des Sports Robert Oubron	2,500
US Ivry	Ivry-sur-Seine	Gymnase Auguste Delaune	1,500

== League table ==
Pos	Team	Pld	W	D	L	GF	GA	GD	Pts	Qualification or relegation
1	Paris Saint-Germain	30	27	1	2	1083	893	+190	55	Qualification for the Champions League group stage
2	HBC Nantes	30	26	2	2	1045	855	+190	54	Qualification for the Champions League group stage
3	Montpellier Handball	30	23	2	5	988	860	+128	48	Qualification for the European League group stage
4	Fenix Toulouse	30	18	3	9	964	921	+43	39	Qualification for the European League group stage
5	Limoges Handball	30	16	4	10	986	966	+20	36	Qualification for the European League qualification round
6	Chambéry SMB HB	30	15	2	13	926	919	+7	32	
7	USAM Nîmes	30	16	0	14	882	910	−28	32	
8	Pays d'Aix UC	30	15	0	15	944	960	−16	28 (Note: Pays d'Aix UC were deducted 2 points.)	
9	Saint-Raphaël VHB	30	11	6	13	988	1018	−30	28	
10	Dunkerque HGL	30	12	2	16	911	930	−19	26	
11	Cesson Rennes MHB	30	10	3	17	885	909	−24	23	
12	C' Chartres MHB	30	9	2	19	890	966	−76	20	
13	US Ivry	30	7	2	21	882	939	−57	16	
14	US Créteil	30	5	6	19	893	991	−98	16	
15	Saran Loiret Handball	30	6	3	21	855	954	−99	15	Relegation to LNH Division 2
16	Dijon Métropole Handball	30	4	2	24	907	1038	−131	10	Relegation to LNH Division 2

Source: LNH
Rules for classification: 1) points; 2) head-to-head points; 3) head-to-head goal difference; 4) head-to-head number of goals scored; 5) goal difference; 6) goals scored.

== Results ==
Home \ Away	CCH	CES	CHA	DIJ	DUN	TOU	NAN	LIM	MON	PSG	AIX	STR	SAR	NIM	CRE	IVR
C' Chartres MHB	—	31–39	22–27	33–27	29–26	31–34	28–28	32–40	22–38	27–34	31–32	24–27	30–34	27–30	29–26	29–24
Cesson Rennes MHB	27–28	—	26–29	32–29	29–33	24–32	26–36	33–29	27–32	24–27	29–30	26–26	30–25	35–26	32–32	32–26
Chambéry SMB HB	25–30	30–29	—	41–29	28–27	33–32	25–39	37–39	30–30	26–34	32–26	39–35	30–23	39–31	35–26	29–28
Dijon Métropole Handball	34–30	29–33	27–31	—	25–32	32–36	22–41	30–34	28–32	31–38	26–33	32–34	29–33	29–31	30–30	34–34
Dunkerque HGL	32–28	31–23	26–27	30–32	—	30–36	23–29	31–38	28–32	33–42	33–32	37–33	31–24	31–26	27–22	32–30
Fenix Toulouse	33–30	29–31	33–32	44–41	34–32	—	24–34	29–29	33–29	31–34	33–26	34–29	29–30	38–28	31–27	34–26
HBC Nantes	33–25	32–26	34–26	47–34	41–36	40–30	—	34–34	31–30	32–30	37–41	35–31	38–24	36–32	38–31	30–22
Limoges Handball	39–34	29–26	29–23	37–29	32–32	29–32	28–33	—	30–36	29–36	35–38	34–31	33–26	32–29	37–35	31–29
Montpellier Handball	39–36	37–29	32–26	33–29	37–25	33–25	31–33	36–34	—	26–31	36–31	35–35	34–28	25–23	36–25	35–29
Paris Saint-Germain	44–30	34–26	34–33	40–32	34–27	29–29	35–32	37–27	31–27	—	39–36	37–29	46–31	32–33	35–27	36–31
Pays d'Aix UC	24–27	34–32	35–34	33–34	34–30	34–39	24–30	35–32	27–29	31–39	—	28–27	35–31	26–29	32–27	38–37
Saint-Raphaël VHB	35–35	31–30	34–33	36–31	38–38	30–30	34–39	39–37	38–42	38–45	29–28	—	33–28	31–33	30–37	33–31
Saran Loiret Handball	32–35	34–34	29–27	31–29	31–24	23–33	30–36	31–32	27–33	29–37	32–34	27–29	—	23–27	28–28	27–29
USAM Nîmes	31–29	24–30	31–28	39–37	33–28	34–27	21–26	34–37	16–27	24–34	31–32	39–37	25–22	—	32–25	30–24
US Créteil	40–35	36–33	39–40	27–33	24–32	30–31	24–38	32–32	26–35	28–41	31–27	37–37	31–31	34–36	—	29–32
US Ivry	32–33	28–32	30–30	33–23	27–34	31–29	28–33	27–28	27–31	34–38	29–28	37–39	33–31	28–24	26–27	—

Source: LNH
Legend: Blue = home team win; Yellow = draw; Red = away team win.

== Top goalscorers ==
Rank	Player	Club	Goals
1	(Poland) Kamil Syprzak	Paris Saint-Germain	220
2	(France) Tom Pelayo	Dunkerque HGL	216
3	(France) Gabriel Loesch	Pays d'Aix UC	191
4	(Spain) Chema Márquez	Saint-Raphaël VHB	189
5	(Serbia) Nemanja Ilić	Fenix Toulouse	183
6	(France) Benjamin Richert	Chambéry SMB HB	170
7	(Spain) Valero Rivera	HBC Nantes	169
8	(Spain) Ian Tarrafeta	Pays d'Aix UC	165
9	(France) Elohim Prandi	Paris Saint-Germain	160
10	(Spain) Mario López Álvarez	US Créteil	159
