= Matej Hrstić =

Croatian handball player (born 1996)

Personal information
- Nationality: Croatian
- Born: 11 August 1996 (age 30) Ljubuški, Bosnia and Herzegovina
- Height: 1.97 m (6 ft 6 in)

Sport
- Sport: Handball
- Position: Left back
- Current club: Limoges Handball
- Number: 44

Senior clubs
- Years: Team
- 2012–2017: HRK Izviđač
- 2017–2021: RK Zagreb
- 2022–: Limoges Handball
National team
Years	Team	Apps	(Gls)
–	Croatia	12	(5)
Medal record
European Championship
Silver medal – second place	2020 Sweden/Austria/Norway
- Updated on 4 January 2024

Matej Hrstić (born 11 August 1996) is a Croatian handball player for Limoges Handball and the Croatian national team.

He represented Croatia at the 2020 European Men's Handball Championship.
