= Teià =

- Municipality
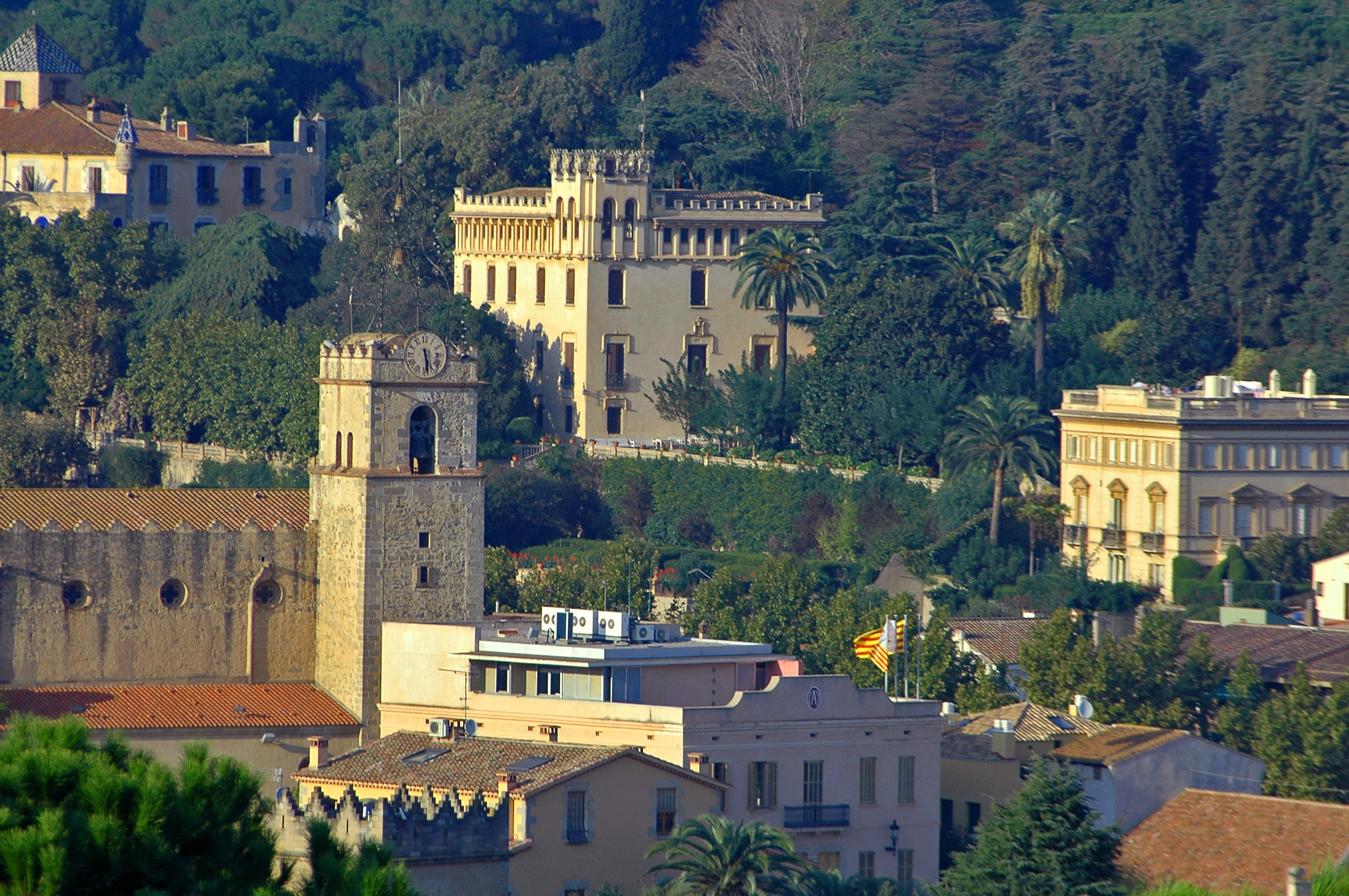
- Old centre of Teià

- Flag Coat of arms

- Location in Catalonia Teià (Spain)
- Coordinates: 41.499°N 2.324°E
- Country: Spain
- Community: Catalonia
- Province: Barcelona
- Comarca: Maresme

Government
  - Mayor: Andreu Bosch Rodoreda (2015)

Area
  - Total: 6.6 km^{2} (2.5 sq mi)
- Elevation: 128 m (420 ft)

Population (2025-01-01)
  - Total: 6,898
  - Density: 1,000/km^{2} (2,700/sq mi)
- Demonym: Teianenc
- Website: teia.cat

Teià (Catalan pronunciation: [təˈja]) is a municipality in the comarca of the Maresme in Catalonia, Spain.

== Twin towns ==
- Massarosa, Italy

== Notable people ==
- Ian Barrufet Torrebejano, Spanish handballer (born 2004)
