= Lars Unger =

German footballer

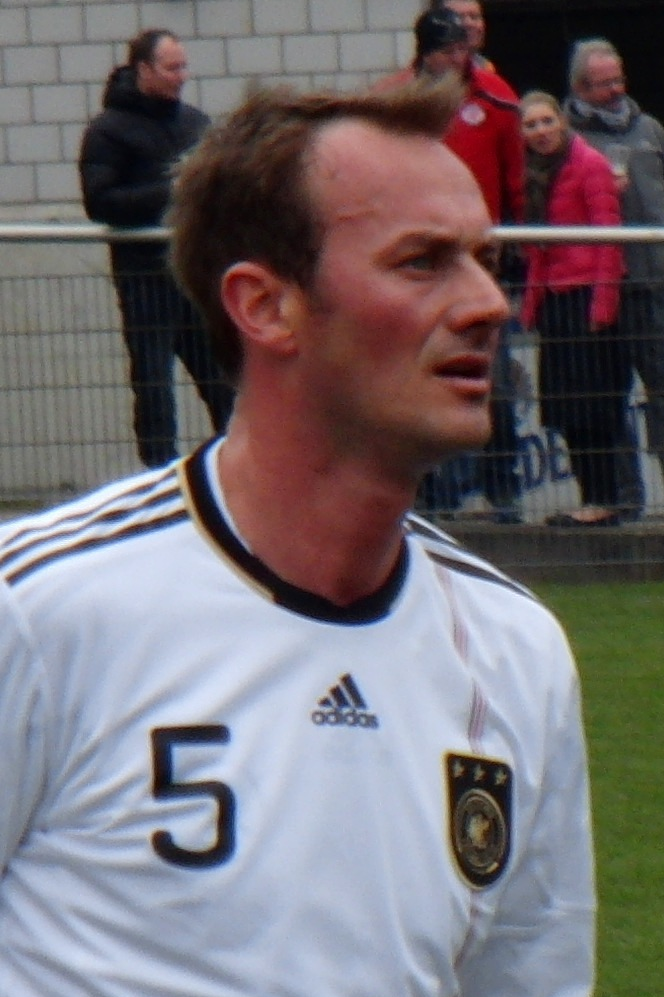
- Unger in 2013

Personal information
- Date of birth: 30 September 1972 (age 54)
- Place of birth: Eutin, West Germany
- Height: 1.89 m (6 ft 2 in)
- Position: Midfielder

Youth career
- TSV Neustadt
- TSV Malente
- Werder Bremen

Senior career*
Years	Team	Apps	(Gls)
1991–1997	Werder Bremen	24	(1)
1997–1999	Fortuna Düsseldorf	39	(2)
1999	Southend United	14	(0)
1999–2003	SC Bregenz	117	(4)
2003–2005	Werder Bremen II	8	(0)
2005–2011	Brinkumer SV	50	(7)
Total		252	(14)

International career
1992–1993	Germany U21	11	(1)
- * Club domestic league appearances and goals

Lars Unger (born 30 September 1972) is a German former professional footballer who played as a midfielder for Werder Bremen, Fortuna Düsseldorf, Southend United, SC Bregenz, and Brinkumer SV. He also represented the Germany U21 national team.

== Career ==
Unger made his debut for Southend United in a Third Division match, in the 3–1 away defeat against Halifax Town at The Shay on 13 February 1999.

== Personal life ==
His son Miro Schluroff is a professional handball player for the German national team.
