= Tomislav Kušan =

Croatian handball player (born 1994)

Personal information
- Nationality: Croatian
- Born: 16 December 1994 (age 31) Zagreb, Croatia
- Height: 2.00 m (6 ft 7 in)

Sport
- Sport: Handball
- Position: Pivot
- Current club: Limoges Handball
- Number: 9

Senior clubs
- Years: Team
- 2012–2015: RK Dubrava
- 2015–2016: RK Medveščak
- 2016–2017: RK Poreč
- 2017–2020: BM Logroño La Rioja
- 2020–2021: RK Eurofarm Pelister
- 2021–2022: HSG Wetzlar
- 2022: Al-Arabi SC
- 2022–2025: Limoges Handball
- 2025–: Győri ETO-UNI FKC
National team
Years	Team	Apps	(Gls)
–	Croatia	5	(7)

Tomislav Kušan (born 16 December 1994) is a Croatian handball player for Limoges Handball and the Croatian national team.

He participated at the 2024 European Men's Handball Championship in Germany.
