= Jure Dolenec =

Slovenian handball player (born 1988)

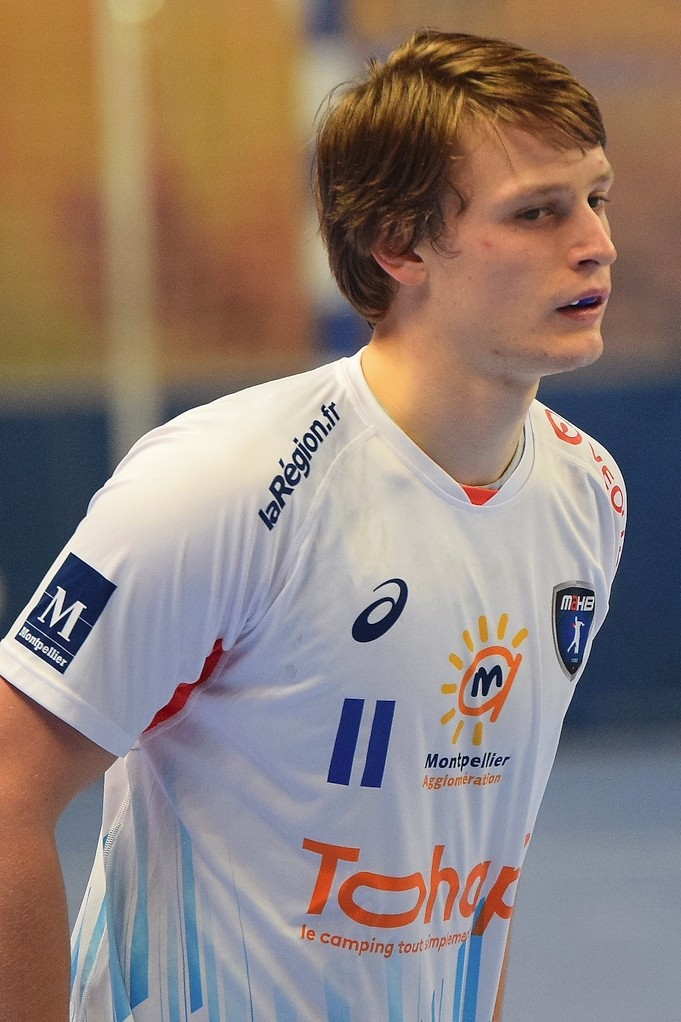

Personal information
- Nationality: Slovenian
- Born: 6 December 1988 (age 37) Kranj, SR Slovenia, Yugoslavia
- Height: 1.91 m (6 ft 3 in)

Sport
- Sport: Handball
- Position: Right back

Senior clubs
- Years: Team
- 2004–2011: RD Loka
- 2011–2013: RK Gorenje Velenje
- 2013–2017: Montpellier Handball
- 2017–2021: FC Barcelona
- 2021–2024: Limoges Handball
- 2024–2025: RK Nexe Našice
- 2025: RD Slovan
National team
Years	Team	Apps	(Gls)
2010–2025	Slovenia	207	(714)
Medal record
World Championship
Bronze medal – third place	2017 France

Jure Dolenec (born 6 December 1988) is a retired Slovenian handball player. He is the all-time top scorer for the Slovenia national team with 714 goals and represented the country twice at the Summer Olympics, in 2016 and 2024. He also represented Slovenia at several European and World championships, including a third-place finish at the 2017 World Men's Handball Championship in France.

Dolenec started his career with RD Loka, and later played for RK Gorenje Velenje, Montpellier Handball, FC Barcelona, Limoges Handball, RK Nexe Našice, and RD Slovan. With Barcelona, he won the EHF Champions League in the 2020–21 season.
