= Ian Barrufet =

Spanish handball player (born 2004)

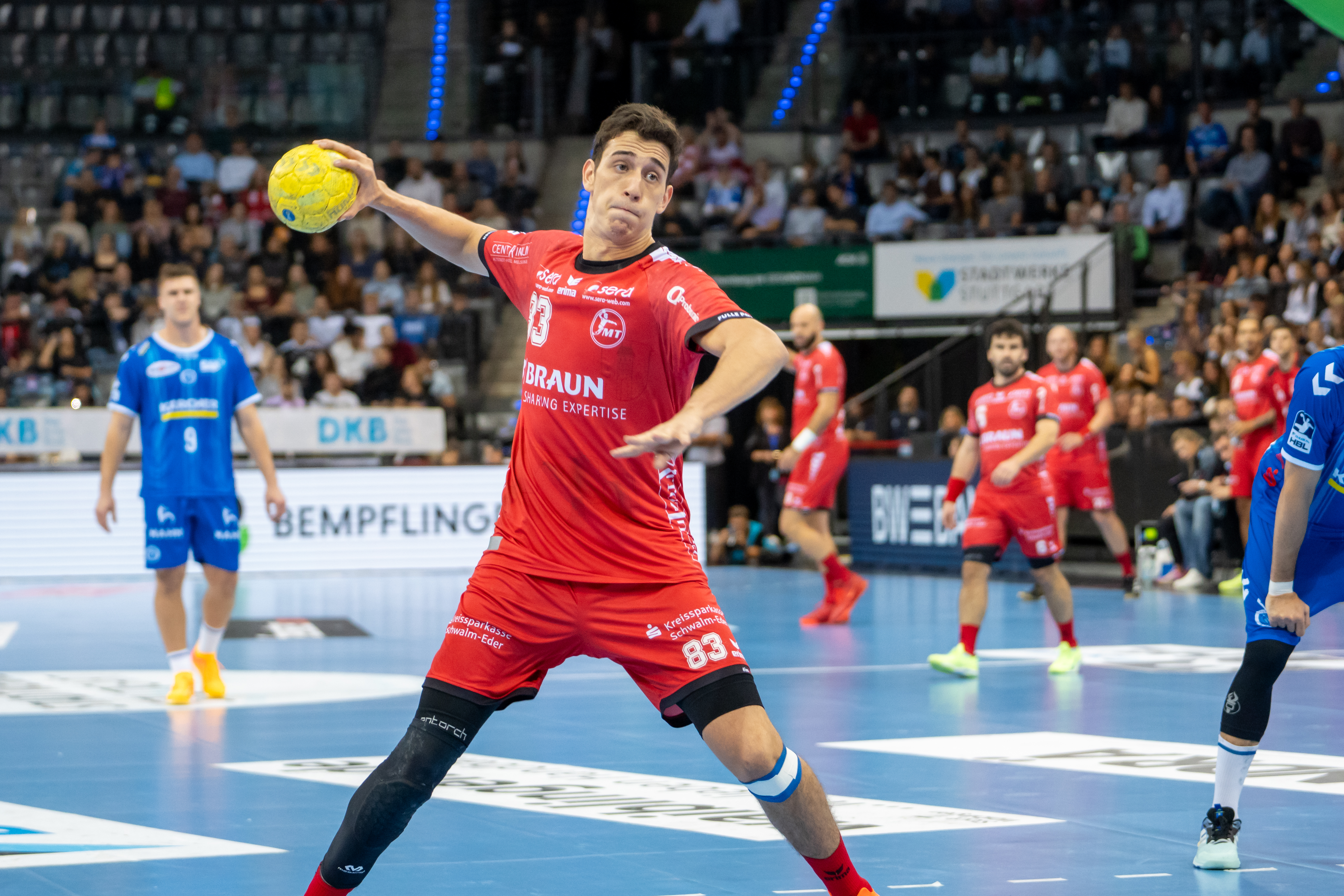
- Barrufet for MT Melsungen in 2024

Personal information
- Full name: Ian Barrufet Torrebejano
- Born: 19 May 2004 (age 22) Teià, Spain
- Height: 1.99 m (6 ft 6 in)

Sport
- Sport: Handball
- Position: Left wing
- Current club: FC Barcelona
- Number: 83

Senior clubs
- Years: Team
- 2022-2024: FC Barcelona
- 2024-25: → MT Melsungen (loan)
- 2025-: FC Barcelona
National team
| Years | Team | Apps | (Gls) |
| 2025- | Spain | 13 | (26) |
Medal record
Mediterranean Games
| Gold medal – first place | 2022 Oran | Team |
- Updated on 1 November 2025

Ian Barrufet Torrebejano (born 19 May 2004 in Teià) is a Spanish handball player, who plays as a left wing for FC Barcelona and the Spanish national team.

== Career ==
Barrufet made his debut for FC Barcelona on 18 March 2023 in a Copa ASOBAL game. Later in the same season he made his league debut.

In the 2024-25 season he was loaned out to the German club MT Melsungen. With them he reached the Final Four of the 2024-25 EHF European League, where the team finished 4th. Barrufet was the tournament top scorer with 90 goals in 18 matches. In the same season he was named the best Left Wing in Europe at the EHF Excellence Awards.

For the 2024-25 season he returned to play for Barcelona.

=== Season stats ===
League statistics
| Season | League | Team | Games | Goals | League position |
|---|---|---|---|---|---|
| 2022/2023 | (Spain) Liga ASOBAL | FC Barcelona | 7 | 14 | 1st place |
| 2023/2024 | (Spain) Liga ASOBAL | FC Barcelona | 13 | 35 | 1st place |
| 2024/2025 | (Germany) Bundesliga | MT Melsungen | 34 | 135 | 3rd place |
| 2025/2026 | (Spain) Liga ASOBAL | FC Barcelona | | | |

== National team ==
Ian Barrufet played 38 games for Spanish youth teams between 2021 and 2023, scoring 94 goals.

At the 2022 Mediterranean Games he won gold medals, along with the 2022 European Men's U-18 Handball Championship and at the 2023 World Men's U-19 Handball Championship.

He made his debut for the Spanish senior team on 8th January 2025. His first major international tournament was the 2025 World Men's Handball Championship, where Spain finished at a disappointing 18th.

== Private life ==
His father David Barrufet is a handball coach and former player, who won the 2005 World Men's Handball Championship with Spain.
