= Miro Schluroff =

German handball player (born 2000)

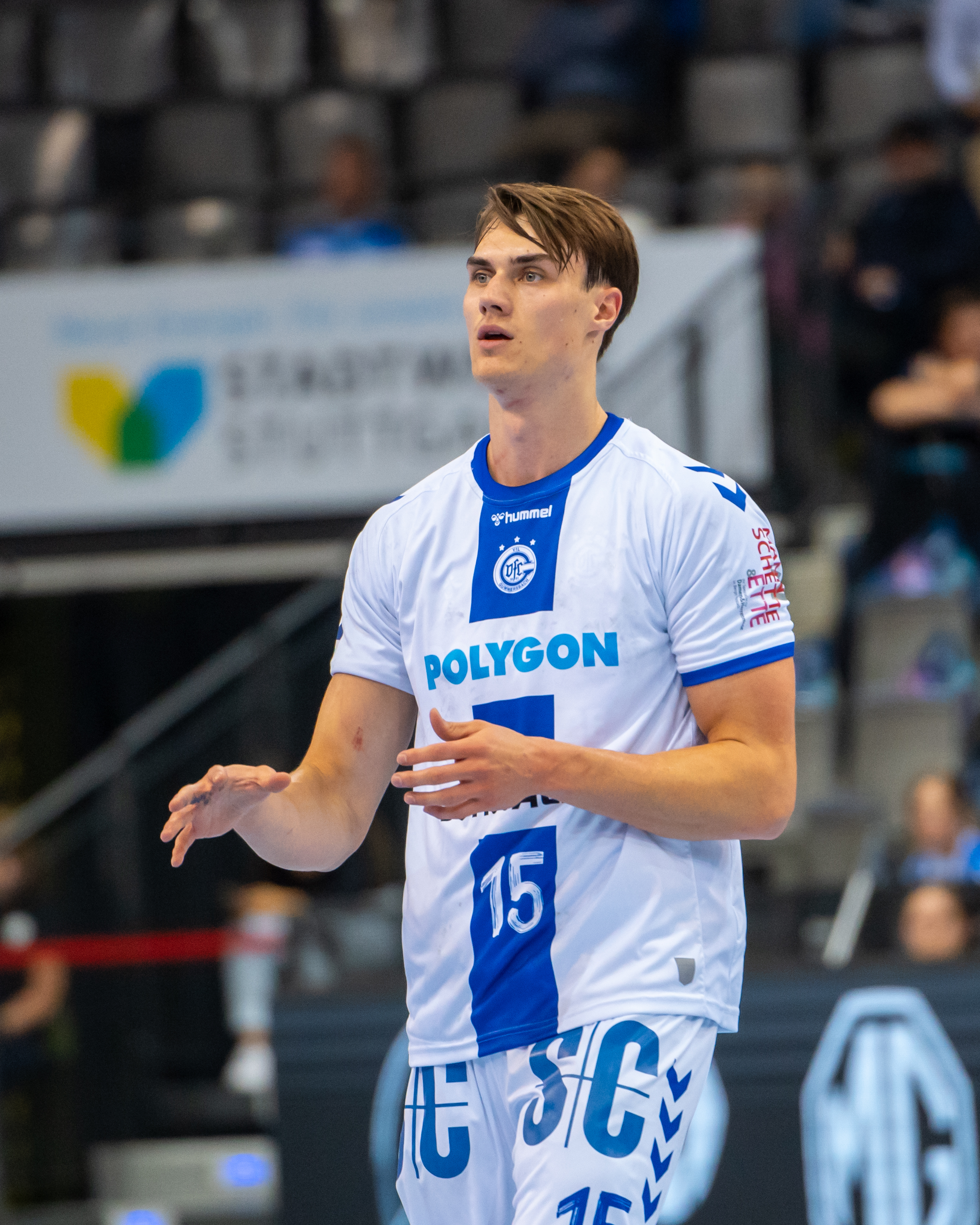
- Schluroff in 2024

Personal information
- Nationality: German
- Born: 25 April 2000 (age 26) Bregenz, Austria
- Height: 1.98 m (6 ft 6 in)

Sport
- Sport: Handball
- Position: Left back, centre back
- Current club: VfL Gummersbach
- Number: 15

Youth career
- Years: Team
- 2011–2017: ATSV Habenhausen
- 2017–2019: HC Bremen
- 2017–2018: → ATSV Habenhausen
- → 2018–2019: Wilhelmshavener HV

Senior clubs
- Years: Team
- 2019–2021: Füchse Berlin
- 2020–1/2021: → Wilhelmshavener HV (loan)
- 2021–2022: GWD Minden
- 2022–: VfL Gummersbach
National team
Years	Team	Apps	(Gls)
2025–	Germany	22	(60)
Medal record
European Championship
Silver medal – second place	2026 Denmark/Norway/Sweden
- Updated on 8 November 2026

Miro Schluroff (born 25 April 2000) is a German handball player for VfL Gummersbach. In addition to indoor handball, he also plays beach handball.

== Career ==
Schluroff started playing handball aged 10, after playing soccer and tennis earlier. Initially he played for ATSV Habenhausen and then he joined HC Bremen in 2017-18. In 2019-18 he was loaned to Wilhelmshavener HV in the 2nd Handball-Bundesliga. After that season he joined Bundesliga team Füchse Berlin, where he played for the 2nd team in the 3. Liga.

He made his debut in the Bundesliga on 8 March 2020 in a home game against SG Flensburg-Handewitt.

After the Covid season in 2020-21 he joined Wilhelmshavener HV on loan again. The loan ended already after 7 games in January 2021, he then joined Bundesliga team GWD Minden to replace the long-term injured Miljan Pušica.

For the 2022-23 season he joined VfL Gummersbach. In 2025 he extended his contract until 2029.

=== National team ===
Schluroff made his debut for the German national team on 13 March 2025 in a European Championship qualification game against Austria. His first major international tournament was the 2026 European Men's Handball Championship, where Germany won silver medals, losing to Denmark in the final.

=== Beach ===
In Beach handball Schluroff played for Team Nordlichter. In 2018 he won the U18 European Beach Handball Championship with the German team.

== Personal life ==
His sister Tony and his cousin Luc are both handball players, and play in the lower leagues of German handball.

His father, Lars Unger, is a former soccer player for Werder Bremen. Miro was born in Bregenz, Austria because his father was playing for SW Bregenz at the time.
