= Antonio García Robledo =

Spanish handball player (born 1984)

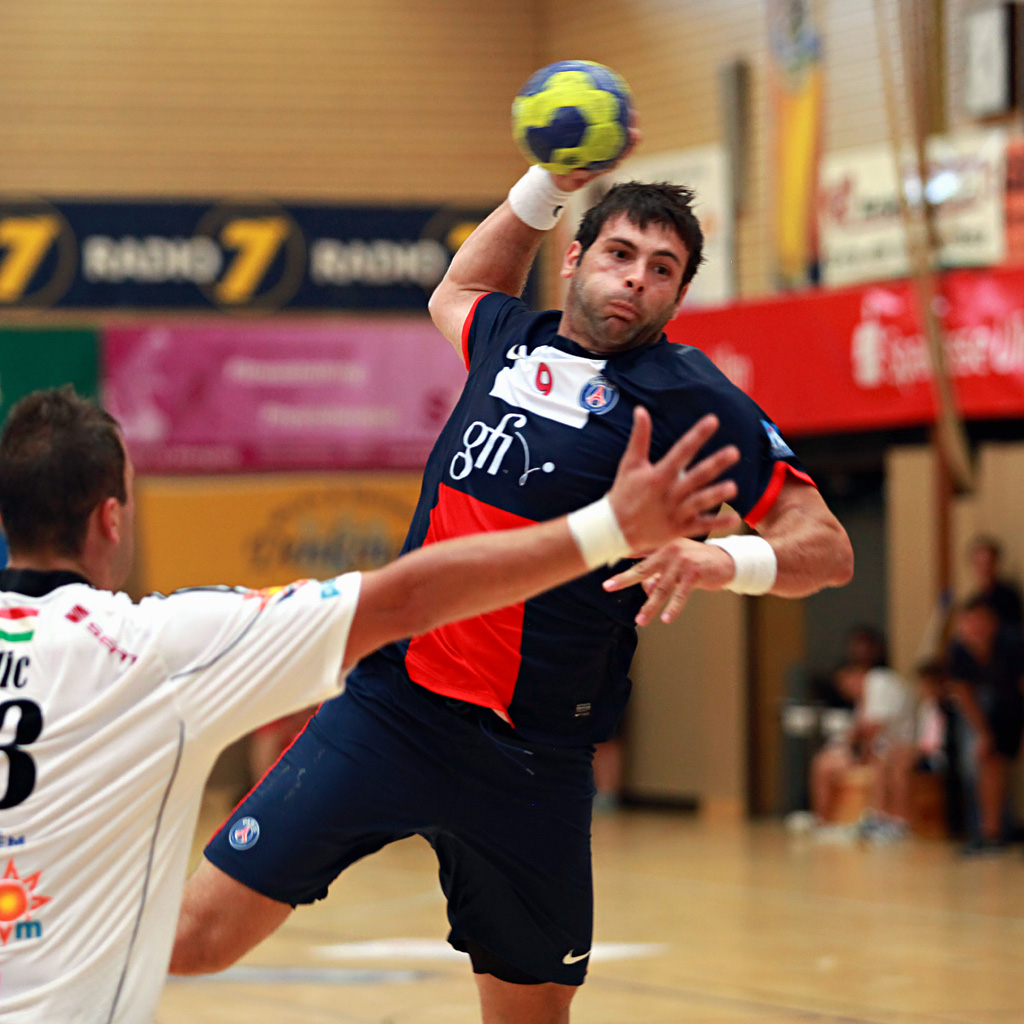
- Robledo in 2012

Personal information
- Full name: Antonio Jesús García Robledo
- Nationality: Spanish
- Born: 6 March 1984 (age 42) La Llagosta, Spain
- Height: 1.93 m (6 ft 4 in)

Sport
- Sport: Handball
- Position: Left back
- Current club: BM Granollers
- Number: 99

Senior clubs
- Years: Team
- 2003–2011: BM Granollers
- 2011–2012: CB Ademar León
- 2012–2014: Paris Saint-Germain
- 2014–2016: SC Pick Szeged
- 2016–2017: KIF Kolding København
- 2017: → FC Barcelona
- 2017–2018: CSM București
- 2018–2019: BM Granollers
- 2019–2020: HBC Nantes
- 2020–2025: BM Granollers
National team
Years	Team	Apps	(Gls)
2004–	Spain	103	(205)

Teams managed
- 2025-: BM Granollers (Assistent)
Medal record
World Championships
Gold medal – first place	2013 Spain	Team
Olympic Games
Bronze medal – third place	2020 Tokyo	Team
European Championships
Silver medal – second place	2016 Poland
Silver medal – second place	2022 Hungary/Slovakia
Bronze medal – third place	2014 Denmark
- Updated on 27 May 2025

Antonio Jesús García Robledo (born 6 March 1984) is a Spanish handball coach and former player who is currently the assistent coach for BM Granollers. As a player he played for the Spanish national team. He is a world Champion from the 2013 World Championship.

== Career ==
Garca started his career at BM Granollers where he played for their second team firstly and then joined ther first team in 2005. With the club he reached the final of the 2009-10 EHF Cup Winners' Cup where they lost to German club VfL Gummersbach.

Because of the club's economic situation he joined Ademar León in 2010.

For the 2012-13 season he signed for French top club Paris Saint-Germain. Here he won the 2013 French Champonshp and the 2014 Coupe de France.

In 2014 he joined Hungarian Pick Szeged. Here he won the Hungarian Championship in 2014-15 and in 2015-16.

In 2016 he joined Danish side KIF Kolding København. Already in March the same season he left Kolding to join FC Barcelona. Here he won the Liga ASOBAL and Copa del Rey. The following summer he joined Romanian CSM București.

For the 2017-18 season he returned to BM Granollers.

In 2019 he moved to HBC Nantes together with Alberto Entrerríos. The following summer he returned to BM Granollers for a third time. In 2022 he and the club reached the final of the Copa del Rey, but lost to FC Barcelona. On March 3rd 2023 he scored his goal no 1000 in the Spanish league.

He retired after the 2024-25 season and became an assistant coach at BM Granollers.

== National team ==
García was part of the Spanish team that won the 2013 World Championship.

A year later he won bronze medals at the 2014 European Men's Handball Championship.

He also represented Spain at the 2015 World Championship.

Afterwards he was not part of the Spanish team for 5 years but made a comeback at the 2021 Olympics and won bronze medals with Spain.

At the 2022 European Handball Championship he won silver medals, losing to Sweden in the final.
