= Seif El-Deraa =

Egyptian handball player (born 1998)

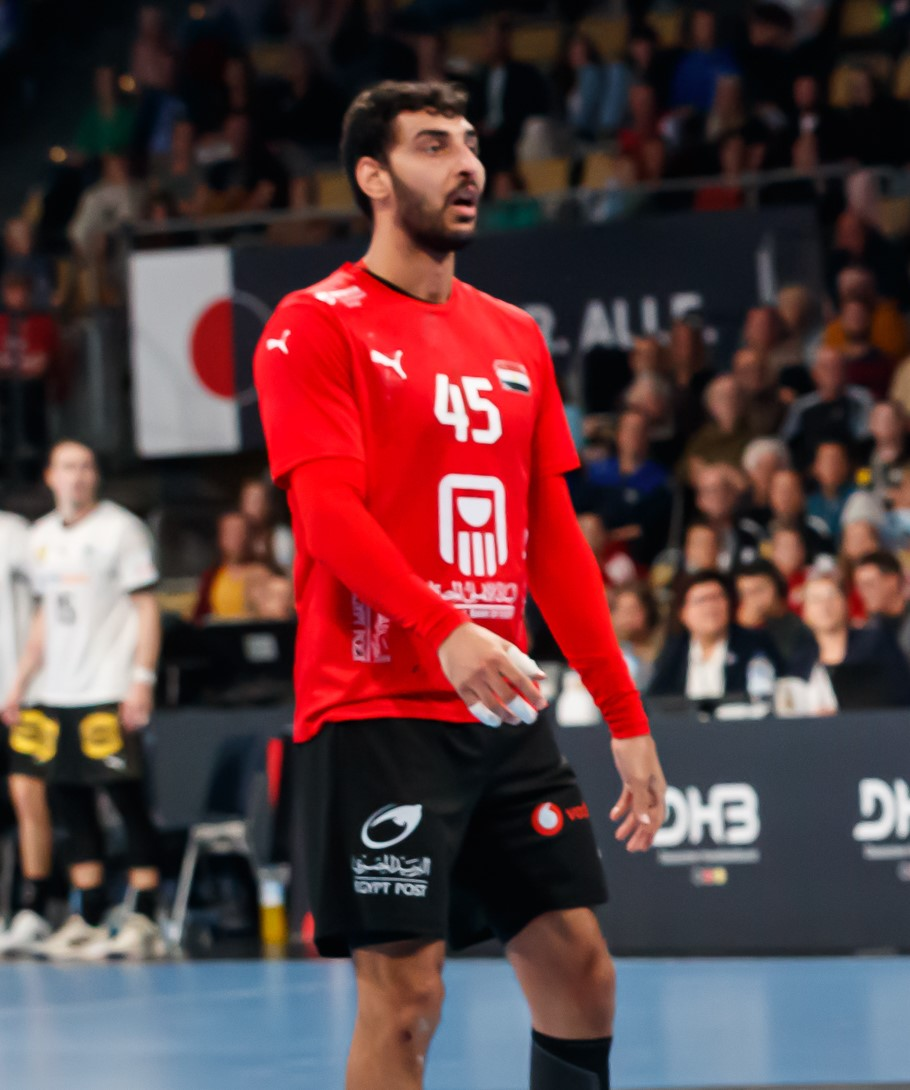

Personal information
- Nationality: Egyptian
- Born: 6 September 1998 (age 28) Cairo, Egypt
- Height: 1.87 m (6 ft 2 in)

Sport
- Sport: Handball
- Current club: FC Barcelona
- Number: 45

Youth career
- Years: Team
- 2005–2017: Heliopolis SC

Senior clubs
- Years: Team
- 2017–2021: Heliopolis SC
- 2021–2022: Zamalek SC
- 2022–2025: Limoges Handball
- 2025–: FC Barcelona
National team
| Years | Team | Apps | (Gls) |
| 2020– | Egypt | 71 | (134) |
Medal record
African Championship
| Gold medal – first place | 2020 Egypt |
| Gold medal – first place | 2022 Egypt |
| Gold medal – first place | 2024 Egypt |
| Gold medal – first place | 2026 Rwanda |
African Games
| Silver medal – second place | 2019 Rabat | Team |
Mediterranean Games
| Silver medal – second place | 2022 Oran | Team |
Junior World Championship
| Bronze medal – third place | 2019 Spain |

Seif El-Deraa (born 19 September 1998) is an Egyptian handball player who plays for FC Barcelona and the Egyptian national team.

== Career ==
He first started handball at Heliopolis SC. then played for Zamalek SC, where he won the Egyptian Handball League in 2022 and 2021 African Supercup. in 2022 he joined Limoges. in summer 2025 he joined Barcelona.

=== National team ===
He participated at the 2019 Junior World Championship. With the Egyptian senior national team he won the 2020, 2022 and 2024 African championships. He represented Egypt at the 2021 World Championship, and the 2020 Summer Olympics in Tokyo. where Egypt finished at a surprising 4th place, 2024 Summer Olympics in Paris. At the 2023, 2025 World Championship he reached the quarterfinal with Egypt.

== Honours ==
Club

Zamalek SC

- Egyptian League: 2021–22
- African Super Cup: 2021

FC Barcelona

- Super Globe: 2025
- EHF Champions League: 2025–26
- Liga ASOBAL: 2025–26
- Copa del Rey: 2025–26
- Copa ASOBAL: 2025–26

International

Egypt

- African Championship: 2020, 2022, 2024, 2026
