= Limoges Handball =

French handball team

- Full name: Limoges Handball
- Short name: LH
- Founded: 2005; 21 years ago
- Arena: Palais des Sports de Beaublanc, Limoges
- Capacity: 5,516
- Head coach: Alberto Entrerríos
- League: LNH Division 1
- 2024–25: LNH Division 1, 9th of 16
- Club colours
Home	Away

Limoges Handball is a French handball team based in Limoges, that plays in the LNH Division 1.

Location of Limoges Handball

== Crest, colours, supporters ==
=== Naming history ===
Name	Period
Handball Club de Limoges	2005–2006
Limoges Hand 87	2006–2020
Limoges Handball	2020–present

=== Kits ===
HOME
Craft; 2020–21	Craft; 2021–22	Craft; 2023–24

AWAY
Craft; 2020–21	Craft; 2021–22	Craft; 2023–24

== Sports Hall information ==
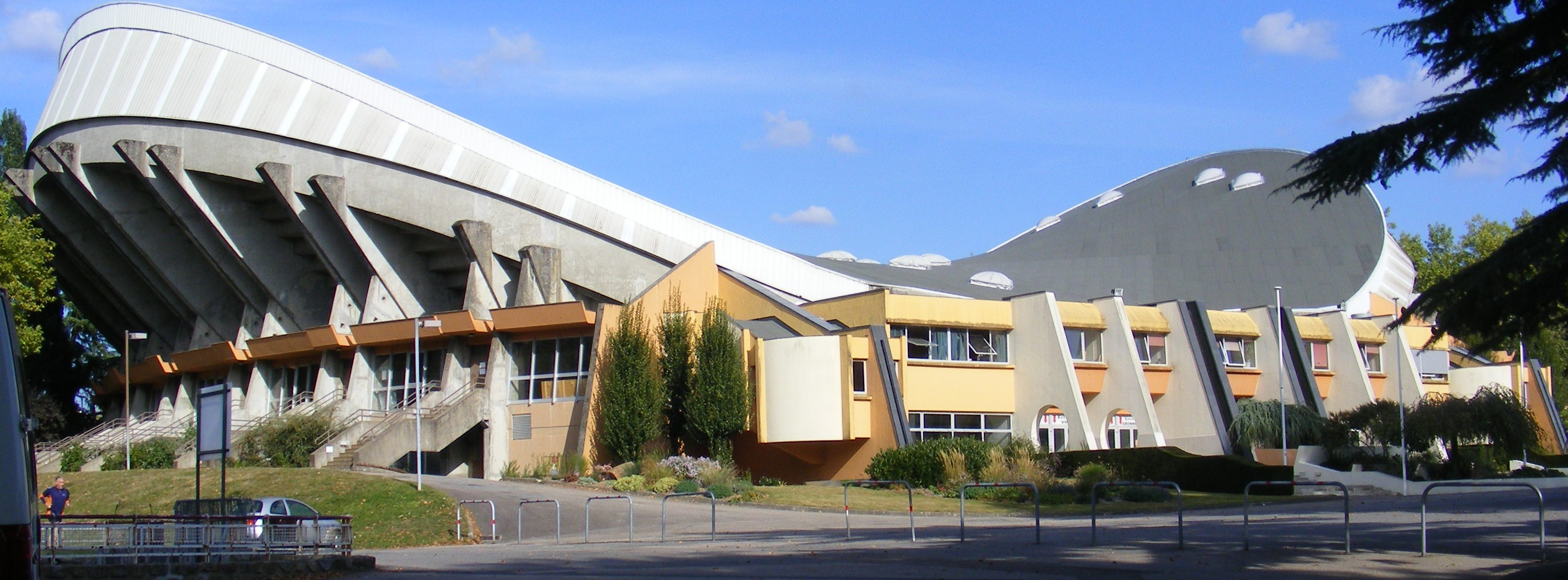
Home hall: Palais des Sports de Beaublanc

- Name: – Palais des Sports de Beaublanc
- City: – Limoges
- Capacity: – 5516
- Address: – Bd de Beaublanc, 87100 Limoges, France

== Team ==
=== Current squad ===
Squad for the 2022–23 season

Limoges Handball

Goalkeepers

- 12 (France) Yann Genty
- 16 (France) Denis Serdarevic

Left wingers

- 32 (Spain) Ángel Fernández Pérez
- 77 (Algeria) Hichem Daoud

Right wingers

- 3 (France) Andréa Guillaume
- 21 (Slovenia) Dragan Gajić

Line players

- 9 (Croatia) Tomislav Kušan
- 28 (France) Nicolas Nieto
- 98 (France) Timmy Petit

Left Backs

- 15 (Spain) David Iglesias
- 34 (France) Romuald Kolle
- 44 (Croatia) Matej Hrstić
- 49 (Brazil) Raul Nantes

Centre Backs

- 45 (Egypt) Seif El-Deraa
- 66 (Israel) Yoav Lumbroso

Right Backs

- 5 (France) Ewan Kervadec
- 11 (Slovenia) Jure Dolenec

=== Transfers ===
Transfers for the 2026–27 season

Joining

- (Poland) Piotr Mielczarski (LB) from (Spain) CD Bidasoa
- (France) Tom Pelayo (RB) from (Romania) Dinamo București
- (France) Valentin Kieffer (GK) from (France) Chambéry SMBH
- (France) Lucas Petit (RW) from (France) Saran Loiret Handball

Leaving

- (Ukraine) Ihor Turchenko (LB) to (France) HBC Nantes
- (Austria) Tobias Wagner (LP) to (Serbia) RK Partizan
- (Croatia) Dino Slavić (GK) to (North Macedonia) GRK Ohrid
- (France) Andréa Guillaume (RW) to (France) Fenix Toulouse Handball
- (France) Léni Serre (RB) to (France) Sarrebourg Moselle-Sud Handball
- (France) Ronan Hassler (RW) to (France) Grand Poitiers Handball 86
- (Nigeria) Faruk Yusuf (RB) loan back to (Poland) Industria Kielce

=== Transfer History ===
Transfers for the 2025–26 season

Joining

- (Spain) Arnau García (LB) from (France) US Ivry Handball
- (Austria) Tobias Wagner (LP) from (Germany) HC Erlangen
- (Italy) Andrea Parisini (LP) from (France) Pays d'Aix Université Club
- (France) Valentin Aman (LP) from (France) US Créteil Handball
- (France) Théo Clarac (LP) from (France) Saran Loiret Handball
- (France) Jules Lignières (CB) from (France) Frontignan Thau HB

Leaving

- (Egypt) Seif El-Deraa (CB) to (Spain) FC Barcelona
- (Croatia) Tomislav Kušan (LP) to (Hungary) Győri ETO-UNI FKC
- Nicolas Nieto (LP) to Tremblay-en-France Handball
- (France) Timmy Petit (LP) to (Portugal) FC Porto
- (France) Axel Boiste (LP) to (France) Handball Club Cournon d'Auvergne

== Former club members ==
=== Notable former players ===
- (France) Yann Genty (2022–2023)
- (France) Denis Serdarevic (2018–2023)
- (France) Jérémy Suty (2019–2022)
- (Algeria) Omar Benali (2014–2016)
- (Algeria) (France) Micke Brasseleur (2020–2021)
- (Algeria) Hichem Daoud (2021–2023)
- (Algeria) Khaled Ghoumal (2014–2017)
- (Algeria) Sid Ali Yahia (2014–2016)
- (Belgium) Nathan Bolaers (2018–2019)
- (Bosnia and Herzegovina) Igor Mandić (2015–2021)
- (Croatia) Matej Hrstić (2022–)
- (Croatia) Tomislav Kušan (2022–)
- (Croatia) Dino Slavić (2023–)
- (Egypt) Seif El-Deraa (2022–)
- (Israel) Yoav Lumbroso (2020–2023)
- (Latvia) Ingars Dude (2018–2022)
- (Morocco) Yassine Idrissi (2019–2022)
- (Montenegro) Bogdan Petričević (2016–2017)
- (Slovenia) Jure Dolenec (2021–2024)
- (Slovenia) Dragan Gajić (2020–2024)
- (Slovenia) Igor Žabić (2020–2022)
- (Spain) Juan Andreu (2019–2021)
- (Spain) Ángel Fernández Pérez (2022-2024)
- (Serbia) Davor Čutura (2017–2018)
- (Ukraine) Ihor Turchenko (2023–2026)

=== Former coaches ===
Seasons	Coach	Country
2005–2008	Yves Aubard	(France)
2008–2019	Nenad Stanic	(Serbia)
2019–2021	Tarik Hayatoune	(France)
2021–2022	Rastko Stefanovič	(Serbia)
2022–	Alberto Entrerríos	(Spain)
