= Palais des Sports de Beaublanc =

Indoor sporting arena in France

Palais de Sports de Beaublanc
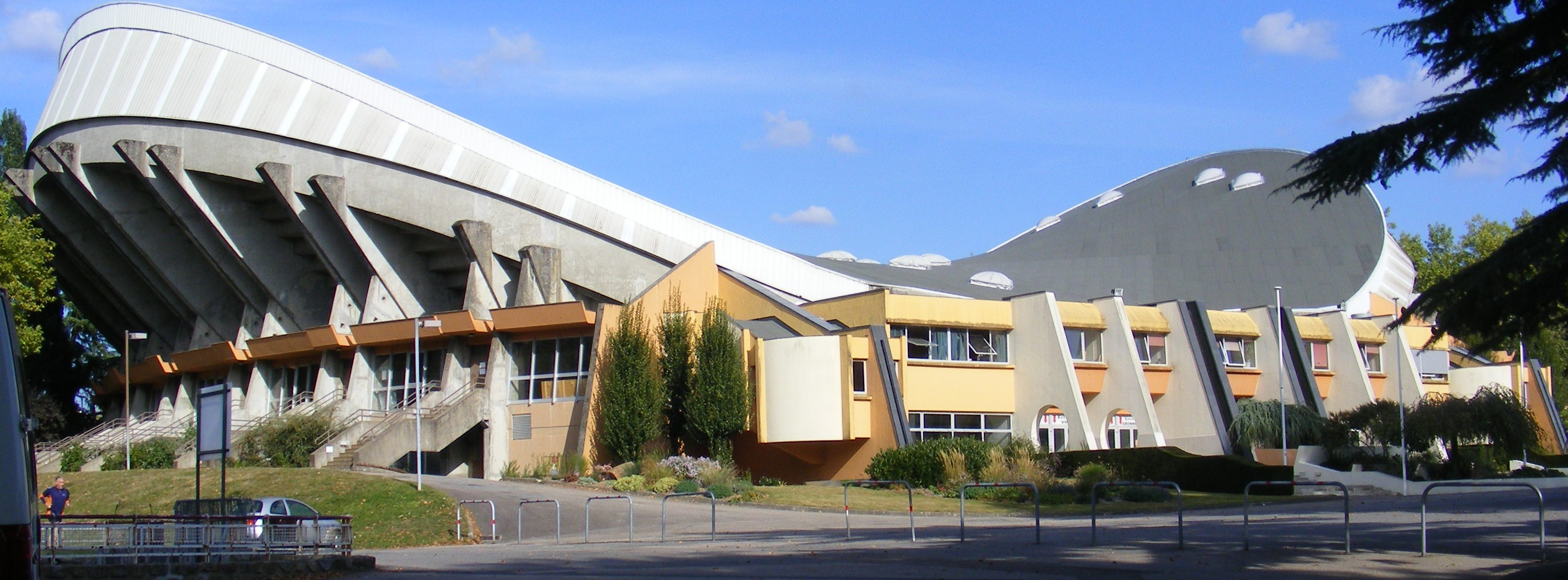
- Interactive map of Palais de Sports de Beaublanc
- Location: Limoges, France
- Coordinates: 45°50′50.87″N 1°14′36.09″E
- Capacity: 6,500
- Surface: Parquet

Construction
- Opened: 1981

Tenants
- Limoges CSP; Limoges Handball

Palais de Sports de Beaublanc is an indoor sporting arena that is located in Limoges, France. The seating capacity of the arena for basketball games is 6,500.

== History ==
The arena opened in the summer of 1981 it was inaugurated on november 28, 1981, in the presence of minister Charles Hernu and the mayor Louis Longequeue CSP hosts ASVEL Basket for the occasion. The first match had already taken place on october 14, 1981 against Dudelange in the Korać Cup. Plans for a Palais des sports emerged in 1955 at the initiative of Albert Chaminade (1912-2009), a proposal was put forward to roof over the 4,000 seat Beaublanc basketball court a facility that had been abandoned since the early 1960s. It was used as one of the host arenas for the FIBA EuroBasket 1983. It has been used as the long-time home arena of the French Pro A League professional basketball club, Limoges CSP, and is also the home of professional handball club Limoges Handball.

== See also ==
- List of indoor arenas in France
