= 2013 World Men's Handball Championship squads =

The 2013 World Men's Handball Championship squads. Each team consists of 16 players.

A provisional squad list of 28 players was published on 19 December 2012 that the 16 player squad were selected.

== Group A ==
=== Argentina ===
Head coach: Eduardo Gallardo

No.	Pos.	Name	Date of birth (age)	Height	App.	Goals	Club
1	GK	Matías Schulz	12 February 1982 (aged 30)	1.80 m	98	3	(Spain) Helvetia Anaitasuna
2	LW	Federico Gastón Fernández	17 October 1989 (aged 23)	1.90 m	79	216	(Spain) Ciudad Encantada
3	RW	Federico Pizarro	7 September 1986 (aged 26)	1.90 m	52	145	(Argentina) Sedalo
4	CB	Sebastián Simonet	12 May 1986 (aged 26)	1.90 m	121	343	(France) US Ivry
5	P	Pablo Sebastian Portela	21 June 1980 (aged 32)	1.84 m	117	89	(Argentina) River Plate
6	CB	Diego Simonet	26 December 1989 (aged 23)	1.80 m	84	242	(France) US Ivry
9	RB	Leonardo Querín	17 April 1982 (aged 30)	1.93 m	91	145	(Austria) Union Juri Leoben
10	RB	Federico Vieyra	21 July 1988 (aged 24)	1.92 m	85	231	(France) Istres HB
11	LB	Guido Riccobelli	28 November 1987 (aged 25)	1.85 m	16	32	(Argentina) UNLu
13	LB	Juan Pablo Fernández	30 September 1988 (aged 24)	2.04 m	87	118	(Argentina) UNLu
14	LW	Agustin Vidal	8 July 1987 (aged 25)	1.73 m	117	253
15	P	Gonzalo Matias Carou	15 August 1979 (aged 33)	1.79 m	165	297	(Spain) Ademar León
16	GK	Leonel Maciel	4 January 1989 (aged 24)	1.83 m	52	0	(Argentina) SAG Ballester
18	LW	Adrián Portela	8 March 1986 (aged 26)	1.90 m	117	89	(Argentina) River Plate
19	RW	Pablo Vainstein	18 July 1987 (aged 25)	1.82 m	45	72	(Argentina) Colegio Ward
20	CB	Pablo Simonet	4 May 1992 (aged 20)	1.78 m	32	57	(Spain) Ciudad Encantada
21	CB	Mariano Castro	28 July 1986 (aged 26)	1.90 m	43	76	(Argentina) CDFC Mitre
22	P	Francisco Schiaffino	9 February 1988 (aged 24)	1.92 m	37	41	(Argentina) River Plate

=== Brazil ===
Head coach: Jordi Ribera

No.	Pos.	Name	Date of birth (age)	Height	App.	Goals	Club
3	RB	Fernando Pacheco Filho	25 May 1983 (aged 29)	1.90 m	114	350	(Brazil) E.C. Pinheiros
7	LB	Guilherme Gama	25 January 1991 (aged 21)	1.93 m	0	0	(Brazil) A.D.C. Metodista
9	RW	Lucas Cândido	19 March 1989 (aged 23)	1.84 m	4	13	(Brazil) H.C. Taubaté
10	LW	Gil Pires	24 January 1982 (aged 30)	1.95 m	45	100	(Brazil) H.C. Taubaté
11	CB	Thiago Santos	3 July 1987 (aged 25)	1.88 m	4	7	(Brazil) H.C. Taubaté
13	CB	Diogo Hubner	30 January 1983 (aged 29)	1.88 m	29	60	(Brazil) A.D.C. Metodista
14	LB	Thiagus dos Santos	25 January 1989 (aged 23)	1.99 m	53	86	(Spain) Naturhouse La Rioja
15	LB	Arthur Patrianova	22 April 1993 (aged 19)	1.90 m	0	0	(Brazil) E.C. Pinheiros
17	P	Alexandro Pozzer	21 December 1988 (aged 24)	1.92 m	25	34	(Brazil) E.C. Pinheiros
18	LW	Felipe Ribeiro	4 May 1985 (aged 27)	1.88 m	150	530	(Spain) Reale Ademar León
19	RW	Fábio Chiuffa	10 March 1989 (aged 23)	1.85 m	49	85	(Brazil) A.D.C. Metodista
21	LB	Gustavo Cardoso	9 January 1982 (aged 31)	1.92 m	82	185	(Brazil) A.D.C. Metodista
22	RB	Oswaldo Guimarães	23 October 1989 (aged 23)	1.83 m	0	0	(Brazil) E.C. Pinheiros
25	P	Vinícius Teixeira	3 April 1988 (aged 24)	1.88 m	67	108	(Brazil) A.D.C. Metodista
81	GK	Luis Ricardo Nascimento	24 September 1980 (aged 32)	2.00 m	99	0	(Brazil) A.D.C. Metodista
89	GK	César Almeida	6 January 1989 (aged 24)	1.87 m	6	0	(Brazil) E.C. Pinheiros

=== France ===
Head coach: Claude Onesta

No.	Pos.	Name	Date of birth (age)	Height	App.	Goals	Club
2	LB	Jérôme Fernandez	7 March 1977 (aged 35)	1.99 m	344	1354	(France) Toulouse Handball
3	P	Didier Dinart	18 January 1977 (aged 35)	1.97 m	370	162	(France) PSG Handball
4	RB	Xavier Barachet	19 November 1988 (aged 24)	1.95 m	54	109	(Spain) Atlético Madrid
8	CB	Daniel Narcisse	16 December 1979 (aged 33)	1.89 m	237	755	(France) PSG Handball
11	LW	Samuel Honrubia	5 July 1986 (aged 26)	1.80 m	40	104	(France) PSG Handball
12	GK	Daouda Karaboué	11 December 1975 (aged 37)	1.98 m	143	0	(France) Toulouse Handball
13	CB	Nikola Karabatić	11 April 1984 (aged 28)	1.96 m	200	827	(France) Montpellier HB
16	GK	Thierry Omeyer	2 November 1976 (aged 36)	1.92 m	281	0	(Germany) THW Kiel
17	LB	Thimothey N'Guessan	18 September 1992 (aged 20)	1.96 m	0	0	(France) Chambéry Handball
18	LB	William Accambray	8 April 1988 (aged 24)	1.94 m	43	125	(France) Montpellier HB
19	RW	Luc Abalo	6 September 1984 (aged 28)	1.82 m	158	533	(France) PSG Handball
20	P	Cédric Sorhaindo	7 June 1984 (aged 28)	1.92 m	99	183	(Spain) FC Barcelona
21	LW	Michaël Guigou	28 January 1982 (aged 30)	1.79 m	167	581	(France) Montpellier HB
23	RB	Sébastien Bosquet	24 February 1979 (aged 33)	1.98 m	101	195	(France) US Dunkerque HB
25	P	Grégoire Detrez	22 May 1981 (aged 31)	1.85 m	44	47	(France) Chambéry Handball
28	RW	Valentin Porte	7 September 1990 (aged 22)	1.90 m	0	0	(France) Toulouse Handball

=== Germany ===
Head coach: Martin Heuberger

No.	Pos.	Name	Date of birth (age)	Height	App.	Goals	Club
2	LB	Stefan Kneer	19 December 1985 (aged 27)	1.94 m	25	39	(Germany) SC Magdeburg
4	P	Oliver Roggisch	25 August 1978 (aged 34)	2.02 m	180	35	(Germany) Rhein-Neckar Löwen
7	P	Patrick Wiencek	22 March 1989 (aged 23)	2.00 m	27	41	(Germany) THW Kiel
9	RW	Tobias Reichmann	27 May 1988 (aged 24)	1.88 m	6	20	(Germany) HSG Wetzlar
12	GK	Silvio Heinevetter	21 October 1984 (aged 28)	1.94 m	81	0	(Germany) Füchse Berlin
13	P	Christoph Theuerkauf	13 October 1984 (aged 28)	1.92 m	41	85	(Germany) Balingen-Weilstetten
14	RW	Patrick Groetzki	4 July 1989 (aged 23)	1.89 m	38	80	(Germany) Rhein-Neckar Löwen
16	GK	Carsten Lichtlein	4 November 1980 (aged 32)	2.02 m	155	1	(Germany) TBV Lemgo
17	RB	Steffen Weinhold	19 July 1986 (aged 26)	1.91 m	31	53	(Germany) Flensburg-Handewitt
19	CB	Martin Strobel	5 June 1986 (aged 26)	1.89 m	66	80	(Germany) TBV Lemgo
20	LW	Kevin Schmidt	20 April 1988 (aged 24)	1.83 m	0	0	(Germany) HSG Wetzlar
23	LB	Steffen Fäth	4 April 1990 (aged 22)	1.95 m	2	2	(Germany) HSG Wetzlar
24	CB	Michael Haaß	12 December 1983 (aged 29)	1.94 m	95	145	(Germany) Frisch Auf Göppingen
26	RB	Adrian Pfahl	30 July 1982 (aged 30)	1.92 m	41	118	(Germany) VfL Gummersbach
33	LW	Dominik Klein	16 December 1983 (aged 29)	1.90 m	153	289	(Germany) THW Kiel
66	LB	Sven-Sören Christophersen	9 May 1985 (aged 27)	1.98 m	80	135	(Germany) Füchse Berlin

=== Montenegro ===
Head coach: Zoran Kastratović

No.	Pos.	Name	Date of birth (age)	Height	App.	Goals	Club
1	GK	Rade Mijatović	30 June 1981 (aged 31)	1.92 m	29	1	(Belarus) Dinamo-Minsk
2	P	Mladen Rakčević	10 February 1982 (aged 30)	1.79 m	37	141	(North Macedonia) RK Metalurg Skopje
3	P	Marko Pejović	8 September 1982 (aged 30)		39	25	(Netherlands) Oci-Lions
5	CB	Mirko Milašević	25 July 1985 (aged 27)	1.96 m	23	17	(Spain) BM Puerto Sagunto
6	RW	Fahrudin Melić	23 August 1984 (aged 28)	1.83 m	29	97	(France) Paris Handball
8	LB	Vladimir Osmajić	17 November 1979 (aged 33)	2.02 m	28	84	(Slovenia) Koper
9	LB	Draško Mrvaljević	17 March 1980 (aged 32)	2.02 m	28	84	(Austria) Bregenz
10	CB	Predrag Ščekić	16 December 1979 (aged 33)	1.83 m	40	79	(Montenegro) RK Lovćen
11	RW	Igor Marković	16 December 1981 (aged 31)	1.83 m	40	79	(Montenegro) RK Lovćen
12	GK	Marko Rajković	8 April 1983 (aged 29)	1.87 m	15	0	(France) Valence Handball
15	LW	Petar Kapisoda	26 June 1976 (aged 36)	1.88 m	25	74	(Switzerland) HC West
16	GK	Nebojsa Simić	9 January 1993 (aged 20)		8	0	(Sweden) H 43 Lund
17	P	Nemanja Grbović	26 April 1990 (aged 22)	1.83 m	8	2	(Montenegro) RK Lovćen
18	P	Novica Ivanović	21 August 1993 (aged 19)	1.80 m	14	55	(Montenegro) RK Lovćen
20	CB	Stevan Vujović	7 April 1990 (aged 22)	1.90 m	17	40	(Montenegro) RK Lovćen
23	RB	Zoran Roganović	26 December 1977 (aged 35)	1.93 m	41	138	(Sweden) H 43 Lund
24	RB	Marko Simović	19 February 1987 (aged 25)	1.93 m	4	4	(Qatar) Al Sadd
25	RW	Marko Lasica	30 April 1988 (aged 24)	1.88 m	12	7	(Spain) CB Cangas
29	LB	Goran Lasica	1 April 1977 (aged 35)	1.90 m	6	4	(Montenegro) RK Lovćen

=== Tunisia ===
Head coach: Alain Portes

No.	Pos.	Name	Date of birth (age)	Height	App.	Goals	Club
1	GK	Mohamed Sfar	4 January 1990 (aged 23)	1.94 m	10	0	(Tunisia) Club Africain
3	LB	Selim Hedoui	1 August 1983 (aged 29)	1.99 m	183	345	(Qatar) Al-Rayyan SC
4	RW	Aymen Toumi	11 July 1990 (aged 22)	1.84 m	33	65	(Tunisia) Étoile Sportive du Sahel
5	P	Mahmoud Gharbi	11 February 1982 (aged 30)	1.91 m	153	259	(France) HBC Nantes
6	P	Issam Tej	29 July 1979 (aged 33)	1.87 m	265	687	(France) Montpellier HB
7	RW	Jaleleddine Touati	7 December 1982 (aged 30)	1.79 m	163	352	(France) U.S. Dunkerque HB
9	RB	Amine Bannour	21 February 1990 (aged 22)	1.97 m	40	135	(Tunisia) Club Africain
10	CB	Kamel Alouini	6 July 1988 (aged 24)	1.87 m	55	114	(Tunisia) Espérance Tunis
12	GK	Marouen Maggaiz	28 July 1983 (aged 29)	1.91 m	123	3	(France) HBC Nantes
16	GK	Wassim Helal	16 July 1982 (aged 30)	1.93 m	73	0	(Tunisia) Espérance Tunis
17	LB	Wael Jallouz	3 May 1991 (aged 21)	1.97 m	37	57	(Tunisia) A.S. de Hammamet
18	LB	Mohamed Jilani Maaref	27 October 1991 (aged 21)	1.92 m	19	21	(Tunisia) Club Africain
19	LB	Mosbah Sanaï	26 March 1991 (aged 21)	1.92 m	26	63	(Tunisia) Étoile Sportive du Sahel
20	CB	Abdelhak Ben Salah	25 April 1990 (aged 22)	1.84 m	10	18	(Tunisia) Étoile Sportive du Sahel
21	LW	Oussama Boughanmi	5 February 1990 (aged 22)	1.85 m	38	125	(Tunisia) Club Africain
22	RB	Oussema Hosni	21 February 1992 (aged 20)	1.93 m	11	18	(Tunisia) Club Africain
31	P	Marouan Chouiref	25 July 1990 (aged 22)	1.97 m	27	33	(Tunisia) Club Africain

== Group B ==
=== Chile ===
Head coach: Luis Capurro

No.	Pos.	Name	Date of birth (age)	Height	App.	Goals	Club
1	GK	Felipe Barrientos Castillo	12 June 1984 (aged 28)	1.85 m	55	1	(Chile) BM Italiano
2	LW	Diego Cristian Reyes	24 July 1992 (aged 20)	1.84 m	26	36	(Chile) Santiago Wanderers
3	P	Alfredo Valenzuela Dupré	13 February 1986 (aged 26)	1.83 m	35	51	(Chile) HB La Reina
4	LB	Erwin Feuchtmann	2 May 1990 (aged 22)	1.92 m	45	136	(Germany) HC Aschersleben
5	CB	Nicolás Jofré Alvarado	16 October 1984 (aged 28)	1.82 m	62	52	(Chile) HB La Reina
6	RB	Rodrigo Díaz Castello	31 August 1992 (aged 20)	1.95 m	18	40	(Chile) BM Italiano
7	LB	Victor Donoso Andalaft	27 November 1990 (aged 22)	1.91 m	29	50	(Germany) HC Aschersleben
8	CB	Esteban Salinas Muñoz	18 January 1992 (aged 20)	1.82 m	27	75	(Spain) MMT Zamora
10	CB	Emil Feuchtmann	1 June 1983 (aged 29)	1.81 m	74	175	(Germany) HC Aschersleben
11	RW	Felipe Maurin García	31 August 1984 (aged 28)	1.90 m	54	100	(Chile) Limari HB
12	GK	Lucas Pacheco	30 April 1991 (aged 21)	1.89 m	40	0	(Chile) HB La Reina
13	LW	Guillermo Araya Proboste	6 August 1985 (aged 27)	1.80 m	50	72	(Chile) Limari HB
14	CB	Cristian Moll	13 March 1993 (aged 19)	1.85 m	18	31	(Chile) Santiago Wanderers
16	GK	Rene Oliva Cifuentes	7 March 1987 (aged 25)	1.95 m	31	0	(Spain) BM Bailén
17	RB	Rodrigo Salinas Muñoz	25 February 1989 (aged 23)	1.86 m	39	92	(Spain) BM Granollers
22	RW	Patricio Martínez Chávez	18 March 1979 (aged 33)	1.75 m	80	170	(Germany) HC Aschersleben
23	LW	Harald Feuchtmann	21 December 1987 (aged 25)	1.78 m	28	40	(Germany) TSV Friedberg

=== Denmark ===
Head coach: Ulrik Wilbek

No.	Pos.	Name	Date of birth (age)	Height	App.	Goals	Club
1	GK	Niklas Landin Jacobsen	19 December 1988 (aged 24)	2.01 m	80	1	(Germany) Rhein-Neckar Löwen
5	LB	Mads Mensah Larsen	12 August 1991 (aged 21)	1.91 m	7	24	(Denmark) Aalborg Håndbold
6	LW	Casper U. Mortensen	14 December 1989 (aged 23)	1.90 m	7	27	(Denmark) Bjerringbro-Silkeborg
7	LW	Anders Eggert	14 May 1982 (aged 30)	1.79 m	101	373	(Germany) Flensburg-Handewitt
10	LB	Nikolaj Markussen	1 August 1988 (aged 24)	2.12 m	33	75	(Spain) Atlético Madrid
11	CB	Rasmus Lauge Schmidt	20 June 1991 (aged 21)	1.93 m	36	48	(Denmark) Bjerringbro-Silkeborg
13	CB	Bo Spellerberg	24 July 1979 (aged 33)	1.92 m	201	289	(Denmark) KIF Kolding
15	P	Jesper Nøddesbo	23 October 1980 (aged 32)	1.99 m	139	301	(Spain) FC Barcelona
16	GK	Jannick Green Krejberg	29 September 1988 (aged 24)	1.95 m	8	0	(Denmark) Bjerringbro-Silkeborg
17	RW	Lasse Svan Hansen	31 August 1983 (aged 29)	1.84 m	91	170	(Germany) Flensburg-Handewitt
18	RW	Hans Lindberg	1 August 1981 (aged 31)	1.88 m	160	434	(Germany) HSV Hamburg
19	P	Rene Toft Hansen	1 November 1984 (aged 28)	2.01 m	58	93	(Germany) THW Kiel
21	LB	Henrik Møllgaard	2 January 1985 (aged 28)	1.96 m	26	44	(Denmark) Skjern Håndbold
22	RB	Kasper Søndergaard	9 June 1981 (aged 31)	1.92 m	115	256	(Denmark) Skjern Håndbold
23	P	Henrik Toft Hansen	18 December 1986 (aged 26)	2.01 m	31	76	(Denmark) Bjerringbro-Silkeborg
24	LB	Mikkel Hansen	22 October 1987 (aged 25)	1.92 m	89	434	(France) Paris Handball
26	LB	Kasper Nielsen	9 June 1975 (aged 37)	1.91 m	184	289	(Denmark) Bjerringbro-Silkeborg

=== Iceland ===
Head coach: Aron Kristjánsson

No.	Pos.	Name	Date of birth (age)	Height	App.	Goals	Club
1	GK	Björgvin Páll Gústavsson	24 May 1985 (aged 27)	1.93 m	118	3	(Germany) SC Magdeburg
2	P	Vignir Svavarsson	20 June 1980 (aged 32)	1.94 m	180	198	(Germany) GWD Minden
3	P	Kári Kristjánsson	23 April 1981 (aged 31)	1.98 m	57	59	(Germany) HSG Wetzlar
4	LB	Aron Pálmarsson	19 July 1990 (aged 22)	1.93 m	65	223	(Germany) THW Kiel
6	RB	Ásgeir Örn Hallgrímsson	17 February 1984 (aged 28)	1.91 m	177	247	(France) Paris Handball
8	RW	Þórir Ólafsson	28 November 1979 (aged 33)	1.89 m	82	188	(Poland) Vive Targi Kielce
9	LW	Guðjón Valur Sigurðsson	8 August 1979 (aged 33)	1.87 m	274	1382	(Germany) THW Kiel
10	CB	Snorri Guðjónsson	17 October 1981 (aged 31)	1.87 m	201	724	(Denmark) GOG Svendborg
12	GK	Aron Rafn Eðvarðsson	1 September 1989 (aged 23)	2.02 m	10	0	(Iceland) Haukar Handball
13	LB	Ólafur Guðmundsson	13 May 1990 (aged 22)	1.94 m	34	24	(Sweden) IFK Kristianstad
14	RW	Arnór Þór Gunnarsson	23 October 1987 (aged 25)	1.81 m	14	38	(Germany) Bergischer HC
17	P	Sverre Andreas Jakobsson	8 February 1977 (aged 35)	1.96 m	138	27	(Germany) TV Grosswallstadt
18	P	Róbert Gunnarsson	22 May 1980 (aged 32)	1.90 m	219	671	(France) Paris Handball
22	LW	Stefán Rafn Sigurmannsson	19 May 1990 (aged 22)	1.96 m	4	3	(Germany) Rhein-Neckar Löwen
24	LB	Ólafur Gústafsson	27 March 1989 (aged 23)	1.96 m	9	20	(Germany) Flensburg-Handewitt
26	RB	Ernir Arnarsson	13 November 1986 (aged 26)	1.93 m	4	1	(Germany) TV Emsdetten
27	CB	Fannar Friðgeirsson	3 June 1987 (aged 25)	1.81 m	3	4	(Germany) HSG Wetzlar

=== Macedonia ===
Head coach: Zvonko Šundovski

No.	Pos.	Name	Date of birth (age)	Height	App.	Goals	Club
1	GK	Nikola Mitrevski	3 October 1985 (aged 27)	1.88 m	21	0	(North Macedonia) RK Metalurg Skopje
3	LW	Dejan Manaskov	26 August 1992 (aged 20)	1.84 m	14	14	(North Macedonia) RK Metalurg Skopje
5	P	Stojanče Stoilov	30 April 1987 (aged 25)	1.92 m	18	26	(North Macedonia) RK Vardar
7	RB	Kiril Lazarov	10 May 1980 (aged 32)	1.93 m	113	900	(Spain) Atlético Madrid
9	LB	Aco Jonovski	29 December 1980 (aged 32)	1.97 m	54	65	(North Macedonia) RK Metalurg Skopje
10	CB	Branislav Angelovski	21 February 1977 (aged 35)	1.92 m	77	151	(Romania) H.C.M. Constanța
11	RW	Vladimir Temelkov	26 March 1980 (aged 32)	1.85 m	78	243	(Luxembourg) HC Bascharage
13	CB	Filip Mirkulovski	14 September 1983 (aged 29)	1.89 m	92	226	(North Macedonia) RK Metalurg Skopje
14	LB	Velko Markoski	5 April 1986 (aged 26)	1.94 m	41	57	(North Macedonia) RK Metalurg Skopje
15	RW	Zlatko Mojsoski	15 November 1981 (aged 31)	1.80 m	28	45	(North Macedonia) RK Metalurg Skopje
16	GK	Borko Ristovski	2 November 1982 (aged 30)	1.90 m	109	3	(Germany) VfL Gummersbach
17	P	Nikola Markoski	22 May 1990 (aged 22)	1.96 m	18	9	(North Macedonia) RK Vardar
18	LB	Naumče Mojsovski	17 June 1980 (aged 32)	1.87 m	106	148	(North Macedonia) RK Metalurg Skopje
19	P	Vancho Dimovski	4 April 1979 (aged 33)	1.87 m	102	221	(North Macedonia) RK Metalurg Skopje
22	RW	Goce Georgievski	12 February 1987 (aged 25)	1.85 m	19	17	(North Macedonia) RK Metalurg Skopje
23	LB	Filip Lazarov	21 April 1985 (aged 27)	1.97 m	43	101	(North Macedonia) RK Vardar
30	RB	Milan Levov	5 April 1987 (aged 25)	1.86 m	9	11	(North Macedonia) RK Metalurg Skopje

=== Qatar ===
Head coach: Borut Maček

No.	Pos.	Name	Date of birth (age)	Height	App.	Goals	Club
4	LB	Hassan Mabrouk	29 July 1982 (aged 30)	1.90 m	5	29	(Qatar) El Jaish SC
5	LB	Mustafa Al-Salti Al Krad	16 March 1987 (aged 25)	1.86 m	0	0	(Qatar) Al Sadd
6	LW	Hamad Madadi	7 July 1988 (aged 24)	1.78 m	61	163	(Qatar) Lekhwiya SC
7	RW	Abdulla Ramazan	26 August 1984 (aged 28)	1.79 m	48	141	(Qatar) Lekhwiya SC
8	LB	Wajdi Sinen	17 September 1990 (aged 22)	1.93 m	46	176	(Qatar) Al Ahli
11	RB	Ahmed Abdelhak	14 February 1988 (aged 24)	1.82 m	0	0	(Qatar) Al-Gharafa
12	GK	Mohsin Yafai	14 May 1981 (aged 31)	1.96 m	89	0	(Qatar) El Jaish SC
13	RW	Eldar Memisevic	21 June 1992 (aged 20)	1.78 m	48	84	(Qatar) El Jaish SC
14	P	Bassel Al-Rayes	4 March 1979 (aged 33)	1.79 m	32	128	(Qatar) Al Rayyan
15	P	Hamad Al-Hajri	5 April 1988 (aged 24)	1.80 m	69	193	(Qatar) Al Rayyan
17	LW	Abdulrazzaq Murad	29 June 1990 (aged 22)	1.86 m	37	68	(Qatar) Al-Gharafa
18	GK	Yousef Al-Maalem	25 September 1979 (aged 33)	1.88 m	72	0	(Qatar) Lekhwiya SC
19	CB	Sahbi Ben Aziza	20 May 1978 (aged 34)	1.94 m	0	0	(Qatar) Al Rayyan
21	RB	Charafeddine Boumendjel	29 March 1988 (aged 24)	1.88 m	0	0	(Qatar) Al-Khor
24	LB	Ahmed Morgan	28 June 1990 (aged 22)	1.90 m	28	58
25	LW	Amine Khedher	20 December 1983 (aged 29)	1.83 m	32	67	(Qatar) El Jaish SC
27	P	Mahmoud Osman	14 April 1982 (aged 30)	1.83 m	11	25	(Qatar) El Jaish SC

=== Russia ===
Head coach: Oleg Kuleshov / Alexander Rymanov

No.	Pos.	Name	Date of birth (age)	Height	App.	Goals	Club
1	GK	Oleg Grams	20 February 1984 (aged 28)	2.01 m	102	0	(Russia) Chekhovskiye Medvedi
5	RW	Alexey Shindin	16 September 1981 (aged 31)	1.73 m	6	11	(Ukraine) Dinamo-Poltava
6	P	Alexander Pyshkin	13 April 1987 (aged 25)	1.97 m	4	1	(Russia) Universitet-Neva
8	RB	Egor Evdokimov	9 March 1982 (aged 30)	2.01 m	84	126	(Russia) Chekhovskiye Medvedi
11	CB	Pavel Atman	25 May 1987 (aged 25)	1.90 m	43	57	(Belarus) Dinamo-Minsk
12	GK	Vadim Bogdanov	26 March 1986 (aged 26)	1.97 m	17	0	(Belarus) Dinamo-Minsk
13	LB	Sergei Gorbok	4 December 1982 (aged 30)	1.96 m	6	35	(Russia) Chekhovskiye Medvedi
14	CB	Dmitry Zhitnikov	20 November 1989 (aged 23)	1.85 m	13	18	(Russia) Chekhovskiye Medvedi
15	LB	Alexey Rastvortsev	8 August 1978 (aged 34)	2.01 m	246	896	(Russia) Chekhovskiye Medvedi
16	GK	Igor Levshin	18 August 1974 (aged 38)	1.98 m	41	0	(Germany) Post Schwerin
18	RB	Daniil Shishkarev	6 July 1988 (aged 24)	1.89 m	13	16	(Russia) Chekhovskiye Medvedi
20	P	Mikhail Chipurin	17 November 1980 (aged 32)	1.90 m	157	432	(Russia) Chekhovskiye Medvedi
24	RB	Eldar Nasyrov	14 July 1986 (aged 26)	1.90 m	6	3	(Russia) Universitet-Neva
25	RB	Sergey Shelmenko	5 April 1983 (aged 29)	1.96 m	17	39	(Russia) Chekhovskiye Medvedi
31	LW	Timur Dibirov	30 July 1983 (aged 29)	1.80 m	118	369	(Russia) Chekhovskiye Medvedi
35	RB	Konstantin Igropulo	14 April 1985 (aged 27)	1.90 m	103	498	(Germany) Füchse Berlin

== Group C ==
=== Belarus ===
Head coach: Iouri Chevtsov

No.	Pos.	Name	Date of birth (age)	Height	App.	Goals	Club
1	GK	Kazimir Kotlinski	12 April 1974 (aged 38)	1.92 m	44	0	(Poland) Górnik Zabrze
2	LW	Ivan Brouka	20 April 1980 (aged 32)	1.84 m	104	420	(Belarus) Dinamo-Minsk
3	LB	Vitali Kazhaneuski	21 April 1985 (aged 27)	1.88 m	23	50	(Belarus) Victoria Regia
4	P	Maxim Babichev	7 March 1986 (aged 26)	2.00 m	75	111	(Belarus) Dinamo-Minsk
8	LB	Dzmitry Kamyshyk	1 May 1990 (aged 22)	2.00 m	29	71	(Belarus) SKA Minsk
10	CB	Barys Pukhouski	3 January 1987 (aged 26)	1.84 m	86	374	(Belarus) SKA Minsk
13	RB	Kiryl Kniazeu	9 March 1990 (aged 22)	1.95 m	11	28	(Belarus) HC Meshkov
14	LB	Siarhei Rutenka	29 August 1981 (aged 31)	1.98 m	25	152	(Spain) FC Barcelona
15	RW	Dzianis Rutenka	14 February 1986 (aged 26)	1.90 m	33	85	(Belarus) Dinamo-Minsk
17	CB	Dzmitry Nikulenkau	12 July 1984 (aged 28)	1.88 m	29	59	(Belarus) Dinamo-Minsk
18	RB	Siarhei Shylovich	16 May 1986 (aged 26)	1.95 m	47	143	(Belarus) Dinamo-Minsk
19	P	Mikhail Niazhura	9 December 1980 (aged 32)	2.00 m	33	8	(Russia) St. Petersburg HC
20	LB	Dzmitry Chystabayeu	23 December 1986 (aged 26)	2.00 m	39	34	(Russia) Medvedi Perm
21	GK	Vitali Charapenka	27 January 1984 (aged 28)	1.93 m	26	0	(Belarus) HC Meshkov
22	P	Viachaslau Shumak	22 December 1988 (aged 24)	2.03 m	34	72	(Belarus) HC Meshkov
24	RW	Maksim Baranau	11 April 1988 (aged 24)	1.88 m	49	127	(Belarus) HC Meshkov
55	P	Aliaksandr Tsitou	28 October 1986 (aged 26)	1.90 m	78	80	(Belarus) SKA Minsk

=== Poland ===
Head coach: Michael Biegler

No.	Pos.	Name	Date of birth (age)	Height	App.	Goals	Club
1	GK	Sławomir Szmal	10 February 1978 (aged 34)	1.90 m	214	2	(Poland) Vive Targi Kielce
2	CB	Bartłomiej Jaszka	16 June 1983 (aged 29)	1.84 m	127	216	(Germany) Füchse Berlin
3	RB	Krzysztof Lijewski	7 July 1983 (aged 29)	1.98 m	125	261	(Poland) Vive Targi Kielce
8	LB	Karol Bielecki	23 January 1982 (aged 30)	2.02 m	178	707	(Poland) Vive Targi Kielce
9	RW	Michał Bartczak	27 February 1987 (aged 25)	1.94 m	2	5	(Poland) Zagłębie Lubin
11	LW	Adam Wiśniewski	24 October 1980 (aged 32)	1.92 m	76	155	(Poland) Wisła Płock
12	GK	Marcin Wichary	17 February 1980 (aged 32)	1.93 m	89	0	(Poland) Wisła Płock
13	P	Bartosz Jurecki	31 January 1979 (aged 33)	1.93 m	168	532	(Germany) SC Magdeburg
14	CB	Michał Chodara	17 March 1986 (aged 26)	1.82 m	3	5	(Poland) Stal Mielec
15	LB	Michał Jurecki	27 October 1984 (aged 28)	2.02 m	130	326	(Poland) Vive Targi Kielce
18	P	Piotr Grabarczyk	31 October 1982 (aged 30)	2.00 m	52	39	(Poland) Vive Targi Kielce
20	LB	Mariusz Jurkiewicz	3 February 1982 (aged 30)	1.98 m	111	173	(Spain) Atlético Madrid
22	RB	Marcin Lijewski	21 September 1977 (aged 35)	1.97 m	248	709	(Germany) HSV Hamburg
23	P	Kamil Syprzak	23 July 1991 (aged 21)	2.08 m	18	27	(Poland) Wisła Płock
30	LW	Przemysław Krajewski	20 January 1987 (aged 25)	1.84 m	2	4	(Poland) Azoty-Puławy
31	CB	Michał Kubisztal	23 March 1980 (aged 32)	1.94 m	39	134	(Poland) Wisła Płock
35	RB	Marek Szpera	9 September 1987 (aged 25)	1.91 m	0	0	(Poland) Stal Mielec
43	RW	Robert Orzechowski	20 November 1989 (aged 23)	1.89 m	32	40	(Poland) MMTS Kwidzyn

=== Saudi Arabia ===
Head coach: Nenad Kljaić

No.	Pos.	Name	Date of birth (age)	Height	App.	Goals	Club
2	CB	Mahdi Al-Salem	16 February 1990 (aged 22)	1.91 m	89	312	(Saudi Arabia) Al-Noor
7	LB	Hussain Al-Mohsin	21 June 1986 (aged 26)	1.84 m	43	125	(Saudi Arabia) Al Ahli
10	LB	Ali Al-Saihati	5 October 1982 (aged 30)	1.80 m	9	7	(Saudi Arabia) Al-Khaleej
12	GK	Manaf Al-Saeed	19 May 1976 (aged 36)	1.89 m	192	24	(Saudi Arabia) Al Ahli
13	RB	Mustafa Al-Habib	28 July 1985 (aged 27)	1.90 m	118	472	(Saudi Arabia) Al-Noor
15	LW	Sultan Al-Obaidi	10 April 1984 (aged 28)	1.87 m	97	284	(Saudi Arabia) Al-Noor
16	GK	Mohammed Al-Salem	3 April 1986 (aged 26)	1.88 m	106	6	(Saudi Arabia) Al-Noor
20	LB	Turki Al-Enbaawi	19 August 1984 (aged 28)	1.93 m			(Saudi Arabia) Al Ahli
23	LW	Ahmed Al-Harbi	30 April 1979 (aged 33)	1.80 m	68	143	(Saudi Arabia) Al Ahli
24	RB	Hisham Al-Obaidi	20 March 1988 (aged 24)	1.83 m	74	246	(Saudi Arabia) Al-Noor
25	RB	Abdullah Al-Hammad	10 October 1990 (aged 22)	1.85 m	46	69	(Saudi Arabia) Al-Noor
37	CB	Mohammed Al-Abbas	19 December 1992 (aged 20)	1.65 m	37	94	(Saudi Arabia) Mudhar Club
52	RW	Seraj Al-Zayer	29 December 1986 (aged 26)	1.81 m	47	70	(Saudi Arabia) Al-Safa
77	RW	Ahmed Al-Abdulali	18 June 1988 (aged 24)	1.85 m	73	183	(Saudi Arabia) Mudhar Club
87	LB	Mohammed Al-Zaer	2 February 1987 (aged 25)	1.84 m	56	112	(Saudi Arabia) Mudhar Club
88	LB	Hussain Al-Hannabi	26 August 1988 (aged 24)	1.81 m	28	39	(Saudi Arabia) Al-Safa
89	P	Yousof Al-Taweel	7 February 1989 (aged 23)	1.83 m	48	149	(Saudi Arabia) Al-Safa

=== Serbia ===
Head coach: Veselin Vuković

No.	Pos.	Name	Date of birth (age)	Height	App.	Goals	Club
2	LB	Milos Dragas	11 June 1990 (aged 22)	2.01 m	6	3	(North Macedonia) RK Vardar
5	LB	Žarko Šešum	16 June 1986 (aged 26)	1.95 m	118	301	(Germany) Rhein-Neckar Löwen
6	RB	Marko Vujin	7 December 1984 (aged 28)	1.96 m	92	381	(Germany) THW Kiel
7	LW	Ivan Nikčević	11 February 1981 (aged 31)	1.81 m	108	393	(Poland) Wisła Płock
8	CB	Marko Krsmančić	2 December 1989 (aged 23)	1.86 m	4	8	(Austria) HC Alpla Hard
11	P	Alem Toskić	12 February 1982 (aged 30)	1.90 m	137	285	(Slovenia) RK Celje Laško
12	GK	Darko Stanić	8 October 1978 (aged 34)	1.90 m	85	0	(North Macedonia) RK Metalurg Skopje
13	LB	Momir Ilić	22 December 1981 (aged 31)	2.00 m	113	392	(Germany) THW Kiel
14	RW	Bogdan Radivojević	2 March 1993 (aged 19)	1.86 m	4	12	(Serbia) RK Partizan
16	GK	Ivan Gajić	17 May 1979 (aged 33)	1.91 m	15	0	(Slovenia) RK Gorenje
17	RW	Rajko Prodanović	24 April 1986 (aged 26)	1.86 m	99	226	(Hungary) SC Pick Szeged
19	LW	Nemanja Ilić	11 May 1990 (aged 22)	1.77 m	8	7	(Serbia) RK Partizan
23	CB	Nenad Vučković	23 August 1980 (aged 32)	1.92 m	107	195	(Germany) MT Melsungen
24	CB	Uroš Mitrović	24 January 1984 (aged 28)	1.91 m	24	32	(Serbia) RK Partizan
25	RB	Nemanja Zelenović	27 February 1990 (aged 22)	1.94 m	1	2	(Slovenia) RK Celje Laško
26	RB	Ivan Stanković	27 April 1982 (aged 30)	1.92 m	57	95	(France) US Créteil Handball
31	CB	Petar Nenadić	28 June 1986 (aged 26)	1.98 m	50	105	(Poland) Wisła Płock
33	P	Mijajlo Marsenić	9 March 1993 (aged 19)	2.02 m	8	11	(Serbia) RK Partizan

=== Slovenia ===
Head coach: Boris Denič

No.	Pos.	Name	Date of birth (age)	Height	App.	Goals	Club
3	LB	Nenad Bilbija	6 February 1984 (aged 28)	2.08 m	33	82	(Germany) GWD Minden
5	LW	Jure Dobelšek	1 April 1984 (aged 28)	1.93 m	73	110	(Slovenia) Koper
6	P	Peter Pucelj	6 December 1982 (aged 30)	1.92 m	28	24	(Slovenia) Gorenje
7	RB	Vid Kavtičnik	24 May 1984 (aged 28)	1.91 m	111	354	(France) Montpellier
8	CB	Marko Bezjak	26 June 1986 (aged 26)	1.84 m	34	51	(Slovenia) Gorenje
10	RB	Jure Dolenec	6 December 1988 (aged 24)	1.90 m	34	142	(Slovenia) Gorenje
11	CB	Sebastian Skube	3 April 1987 (aged 25)	1.89 m	67	151	(Slovenia) Celje
12	GK	Gorazd Škof	11 July 1977 (aged 35)	1.88 m	134	0	(Slovenia) Koper
16	GK	Primož Prošt	14 July 1984 (aged 28)	1.86 m	45	0	(France) Montpellier
18	P	Uroš Bundalo	29 April 1989 (aged 23)	1.98 m	17	27	(Slovenia) Koper
19	P	Miha Žvižej	6 November 1987 (aged 25)	1.93 m	55	139	(France) Toulouse Handball
20	LW	Luka Žvižej	9 December 1980 (aged 32)	1.85 m	166	562	(Slovenia) Celje
22	P	Matej Gaber	22 July 1991 (aged 21)	1.97 m	23	15	(Slovenia) Gorenje
23	CB	Uroš Zorman	9 January 1980 (aged 33)	1.90 m	172	432	(Poland) Vive Targi Kielce
24	RW	Gašper Marguč	20 August 1990 (aged 22)	1.80 m	18	60	(Slovenia) RK Celje Laško
25	LB	Borut Mačkovšek	11 September 1992 (aged 20)	2.04 m	16	16	(Slovenia) RK Celje Laško
30	RW	Dragan Gajić	21 July 1984 (aged 28)	1.88 m	109	365	(France) Montpellier HB

=== South Korea ===
Head coach: Lee Sang-Sup

No.	Pos.	Name	Date of birth (age)	Height	App.	Goals	Club
1	GK	Lee Dong-myung	15 April 1983 (aged 29)	1.81 m	29	0	(South Korea) Doosan
2	CB	Jeong Yi-kyeong	28 February 1985 (aged 27)	1.88 m	95	232	(South Korea) Doosan
5	P	Park Kyung-suk	25 April 1981 (aged 31)	1.85 m	60	75	(South Korea) Chungnam
8	P	Park Jung-geu	2 November 1983 (aged 29)	1.90 m	110	242	(South Korea) KHF
10	P	Park Chan-yong	1 January 1980 (aged 33)	1.90 m	63	91	(South Korea) Incheon
11	LW	Lim Duk-jun	30 August 1980 (aged 32)	1.86 m	42	54	(South Korea) Doosan
12	GK	Park Chan-young	26 January 1983 (aged 29)	1.90 m	110	0	(South Korea) Doosan
14	LB	Yoon Ci-yoel	5 May 1984 (aged 28)	1.89 m	21	30	(South Korea) Sangmu Phoenix
16	GK	Kang Il-koo	26 April 1976 (aged 36)	1.86 m	142	0	(South Korea) Incheon
17	LW	Jeong Han	17 May 1988 (aged 24)	1.86 m	32	67	(South Korea) Incheon
18	RW	Hwang Do-yeop	2 January 1993 (aged 20)	1.88 m	9	15	(South Korea) KNSU
20	RB	Kim Se-ho	12 April 1989 (aged 23)	1.83 m	6	11	(South Korea) Doosan
21	RW	Na Seung-do	27 January 1990 (aged 22)	1.92 m	26	56	(South Korea) Doosan
22	RB	Lee Eun-ho	28 August 1989 (aged 23)	1.81 m	8	19	(South Korea) Chungnam
23	CB	Kim Dong-cheol	8 July 1989 (aged 23)	1.80 m	6	12	(South Korea) Chungnam
27	LB	Park Young-gil	14 May 1989 (aged 23)	1.84 m	2	8	(South Korea) Incheon
33	CB	Eom Hyo-won	12 December 1986 (aged 26)	1.85 m	32	75	(South Korea) Sangmu Phoenix
88	LB	Oh Yun-suk	3 January 1984 (aged 29)	1.95 m	72	142	(South Korea) Doosan

== Group D ==
=== Algeria ===
Head coach: Salah Bouchekriou

No.	Pos.	Name	Date of birth (age)	Height	App.	Goals	Club
2	LB	Yacinn Bouakaz	18 May 1980 (aged 32)	1.90 m	40	20	(France) HB Chartres
3	LB	Omar Chahbour	4 June 1984 (aged 28)	1.85 m	85	205	(Algeria) GS Pétroliers
4	RB	Hamza Zouaoui	4 February 1987 (aged 25)	1.85 m	70	140	(Algeria) GS Pétroliers
5	LW	Salah Eddine Cheikh	24 February 1983 (aged 29)	1.84 m	15	74	(Algeria) HBC El Biar
6	LB	Messaoud Berkous	20 July 1989 (aged 23)	1.89 m	70	178	(Algeria) GS Pétroliers
7	CB	Hichem Daoud	9 January 1992 (aged 21)	1.92 m	49	38	(Algeria) HBC El Biar
8	P	Hichem Boudrali	29 October 1977 (aged 35)	1.88 m	175	110	(Algeria) GS Pétroliers
9	CB	Abdelkader Rahim	12 July 1990 (aged 22)	1.88 m	40	25	(France) ASPTT Nancy
10	RB	Sassi Boultif	9 January 1983 (aged 30)	1.91 m	85	195	(France) OC Cesson
12	GK	Samir Kerbouche	16 December 1978 (aged 34)	1.88 m	80	0	(Algeria) CRB Baraki
13	LW	Riad Chahbour	28 July 1985 (aged 27)	1.85 m	80	200	(Algeria) GS Pétroliers
15	RW	Omar Benali	26 May 1983 (aged 29)	1.82 m	30	99	(France) Caen HB
17	RB	Abderrahim Berriah	19 January 1988 (aged 24)	1.95 m	70	185	(Tunisia) Étoile du Sahel
18	P	Hichem Kaabache	12 March 1990 (aged 22)	1.92 m	50	113	(Algeria) JSE Skikda
19	LW	Ayatallah el Khoumini Hamoud	10 August 1990 (aged 22)	1.86 m	46	34	(Algeria) ES Ain Touta
21	P	Mohamed Aski Mokrani	31 January 1981 (aged 31)	1.88 m	45	34	(France) US Dunkerque HB
22	GK	Adel Bousmal	1 May 1985 (aged 27)	1.88 m	10	0	(Algeria) GSB Boufarik

=== Australia ===
Head coach: Taip Ramadani

No.	Pos.	Name	Date of birth (age)	Height	App.	Goals	Club
1	GK	Ognjen Latinovic	2 August 1985 (aged 27)	1.80 m	41	0	(Australia) University of Queensland
3	LW	Almir Pandzo	2 September 1992 (aged 20)	1.90 m	0	0	(Bosnia and Herzegovina) RK Iskra Bugojno
4	RB	Bevan Calvert	4 April 1986 (aged 26)	1.77 m	39	113	(Germany) TSV Altenholz
5	P	Tommy Fletcher	18 March 1990 (aged 22)	1.86 m	22	86	(Sweden) Skogås HK
6	P	Callum Mouncey	21 October 1989 (aged 23)	1.89 m	2	4	(Australia) Canberra HC
7	RW	Antonio Queiroz	6 August 1980 (aged 32)	1.78 m	0	0	(Australia) St. Kilda HC
9	RB	Martin Najdovski	22 May 1990 (aged 22)	1.85 m	0	0	(Sweden) Trelleborgs HB
10	CB	Caleb Gahan	2 August 1989 (aged 23)	1.90 m	2	6	(Australia) Logan HC
12	GK	Kristofer Karlsson	26 October 1992 (aged 20)	1.87 m	0	0	(Sweden) AIK Handboll
14	LW	Mitchell Hedges	14 February 1991 (aged 21)	1.76 m	12	9	(Australia) Harbourside
15	RW	Daniel Kelly	7 May 1988 (aged 24)	1.76 m	27	55	(Denmark) KFUMs Boldklub
16	GK	Boris Jovanović	28 April 1986 (aged 26)	1.94 m	4	0	(Norway) Ankenes HK
17	RB	Tim Anderson	17 August 1991 (aged 21)	1.92 m	2	2	(Australia) Hills HC
18	P	Jay Abiera	11 May 1989 (aged 23)	1.88 m	0	0	(Australia) St. Kilda HC
21	LB	Ognjen Matic	21 August 1989 (aged 23)	1.97 m	24	33	(Australia) University of Sydney
31	LB	Nemanja Subotic	5 April 1983 (aged 29)	1.94 m	28	53	(Serbia) RK BASK

=== Croatia ===
Head coach: Slavko Goluža

No.	Pos.	Name	Date of birth (age)	Height	App.	Goals	Club
5	CB	Domagoj Duvnjak	1 June 1988 (aged 24)	1.97 m	108	322	(Germany) HSV Hamburg
6	LB	Blaženko Lacković	25 December 1980 (aged 32)	1.96 m	186	566	(Germany) HSV Hamburg
7	RB	Luka Stepančić	20 November 1990 (aged 22)	2.01 m	1	0	(Croatia) RK Zagreb
8	RB	Marko Kopljar	12 February 1986 (aged 26)	2.10 m	77	118	(France) Paris Handball
9	P	Igor Vori	20 September 1980 (aged 32)	2.03 m	193	514	(France) Paris Handball
10	LB	Jakov Gojun	18 April 1986 (aged 26)	2.04 m	76	43	(Spain) Atlético Madrid
13	RW	Zlatko Horvat	25 September 1984 (aged 28)	1.79 m	70	151	(Croatia) RK Zagreb
14	LB	Drago Vuković	3 August 1983 (aged 29)	1.94 m	121	188	(Germany) Nettelstedt-Lübbecke
16	GK	Filip Ivić	30 August 1992 (aged 20)	1.95 m	2	0	(Croatia) RK Zagreb
17	LW	Lovro Šprem	22 January 1990 (aged 22)	1.85 m	0	0	(Croatia) RK Zagreb
20	LB	Damir Bičanić	25 June 1985 (aged 27)	1.94 m	47	71	(France) Chambéry Handball
23	LB	Stipe Mandalinić	9 September 1992 (aged 20)	1.95 m	0	0	(Croatia) RK Zagreb
25	GK	Mirko Alilović	15 September 1985 (aged 27)	2.00 m	109	0	(Hungary) MKB Veszprém
26	LW	Manuel Štrlek	1 December 1988 (aged 24)	1.81 m	54	171	(Poland) Vive Targi Kielce
27	RW	Ivan Čupić	27 March 1986 (aged 26)	1.78 m	82	327	(Poland) Vive Targi Kielce
28	P	Marino Marić	1 June 1990 (aged 22)	1.96 m	13	14	(Croatia) RK Zagreb

=== Egypt ===
Head coach: Assem Daoud

No.	Pos.	Name	Date of birth (age)	Height	App.	Goals	Club
1	GK	Karim Handawy	1 May 1988 (aged 24)	1.86 m	90		(Egypt) Zamalek
4	LW	Omar Elsweidy	7 November 1988 (aged 24)	1.80 m	66		(Egypt) Al-Masry
7	LB	Mostafa Khalil	3 March 1992 (aged 20)	1.87 m	40		(Egypt) Al Ahly
8	P	Mohamed Ahmed	7 March 1984 (aged 28)	1.80 m	150		(Egypt) Al Ahly
9	CB	Islam Hassan	2 July 1988 (aged 24)	1.86 m	100		(Egypt) Al Ahly
10	RB	Abou El-Fetouh Ahmed	12 February 1987 (aged 25)	1.87 m	162		(Egypt) Smouha
12	GK	Mohamed Mahmoud	6 April 1974 (aged 38)	1.90 m	166		(Egypt) Al-Masry
15	RW	Mohamed Abdelrahman	12 December 1987 (aged 25)	1.80 m	35		(Egypt) Al Ahly
17	LW	Ahmed Essam	4 March 1988 (aged 24)	1.87 m	72		(Egypt) Aviation
19	CB	Mohamed Hesham	10 May 1990 (aged 22)	1.84 m	90		(Egypt) Al-Masry
20	CB	Mohamed Alaa	13 January 1988 (aged 24)	1.78 m	110		(Egypt) Aviation
22	LB	Omar Gamal	13 March 1990 (aged 22)	1.92 m	90		(Egypt) Police
24	P	Ibrahim Mohamed	11 March 1989 (aged 23)	1.86 m	75		(Egypt) Police
66	RB	Ahmed Mostafa	27 January 1984 (aged 28)	1.80 m	160		Qatar Army
86	GK	Hady Mohamed	2 September 1986 (aged 26)	1.88 m	99		(Egypt) Al Ahly
89	P	Mohamed Mamdouh	1 April 1989 (aged 23)	1.85 m	100		(Egypt) Zamalek
90	LB	Ali Zein	14 December 1990 (aged 22)	1.90 m	98		(Egypt) Al Ahly
91	RW	Mohamed Hisham	16 January 1991 (aged 21)	1.81 m	90		(Egypt) Zamalek

=== Hungary ===
Head coach: Lajos Mocsai

No.	Pos.	Name	Date of birth (age)	Height	App.	Goals	Club
1	GK	Péter Tatai	23 June 1983 (aged 29)	1.95 m	58	0	(Hungary) Pick Szeged
4	P	Szabolcs Szöllősi	28 January 1989 (aged 23)	1.94 m	19	21	(Hungary) Csurgói KK
6	RB	Tamás Mocsai	9 December 1978 (aged 34)	1.96 m	163	393	(Germany) TSV Hannover-Burgdorf
7	CB	Gábor Császár	16 June 1984 (aged 28)	1.86 m	173	586	(Hungary) MKB Veszprém
8	LW	Gergő Iváncsik	30 November 1981 (aged 31)	1.90 m	219	594	(Hungary) MKB Veszprém
10	RW	Gergely Harsányi	3 May 1981 (aged 31)	1.91 m	131	248	(Hungary) Tatabánya-Carbonex
11	LB	Barna Putics	18 August 1984 (aged 28)	2.00 m	66	157	(Germany) VfL Gummersbach
13	RB	Milorad Krivokapić	30 July 1980 (aged 32)	1.90 m	26	63	(Slovenia) Koper
16	GK	Roland Mikler	20 September 1984 (aged 28)	1.90 m	107	0	(Hungary) Pick Szeged
18	CB	Kornél Nagy	21 November 1986 (aged 26)	1.95 m	81	109	(France) Dunkerque Handball
19	RB	László Nagy	3 March 1981 (aged 31)	2.08 m	153	594	(Hungary) MKB Veszprém
24	LW	Attila Vadkerti	22 February 1982 (aged 30)	1.82 m	78	111	(Hungary) Pick Szeged
25	P	Szabolcs Zubai	31 March 1984 (aged 28)	1.91 m	145	230	(Hungary) Pick Szeged
28	P	Timuzsin Schuch	5 June 1985 (aged 27)	1.97 m	83	57	(Hungary) MKB Veszprém
33	RB	Gábor Ancsin	27 November 1990 (aged 22)	2.00 m	25	43	(Hungary) Pick Szeged
66	CB	Máté Lékai	16 June 1988 (aged 24)	1.90 m	51	91	(Slovenia) RK Celje

=== Spain ===
Head coach: Valero Rivera

No.	Pos.	Name	Date of birth (age)	Height	App.	Goals	Club
2	LB	Alberto Entrerríos	7 November 1976 (aged 36)	1.94 m	228	693	(France) HBC Nantes
4	RW	Albert Rocas	21 June 1982 (aged 30)	1.88 m	56	79	(Spain) FC Barcelona
5	RB	Jorge Maqueda	6 December 1988 (aged 24)	1.97 m	50	92	(France) HBC Nantes
8	RW	Víctor Tomás	15 February 1985 (aged 27)	1.78 m	98	308	(Spain) FC Barcelona
11	CB	Daniel Sarmiento Melián	25 August 1983 (aged 29)	1.86 m	40	98	(Spain) FC Barcelona
12	GK	José Manuel Sierra	21 May 1978 (aged 34)	1.94 m	78	0	(France) Paris Handball
13	P	Julen Aguinagalde	8 December 1982 (aged 30)	1.95 m	96	246	(Spain) Atlético Madrid
16	GK	Arpad Sterbik	20 November 1979 (aged 33)	2.00 m	41	0	(Spain) FC Barcelona
21	CB	Joan Cañellas	30 September 1986 (aged 26)	1.98 m	69	173	(Spain) Atlético Madrid
22	RB	Ángel Montoro	10 April 1989 (aged 23)	2.12 m	8	9	(Spain) FC Barcelona
24	LB	Viran Morros	15 December 1983 (aged 29)	1.99 m	102	106	(Spain) FC Barcelona
25	CB	Carlos Ruesga	10 March 1985 (aged 27)	1.84 m	161	349	(Spain) Ademar León
26	LB	Antonio García	6 March 1984 (aged 28)	1.91 m	12	23	(France) Paris Handball
28	LW	Valero Rivera	22 February 1985 (aged 27)	1.85 m	10	20	(France) HBC Nantes
29	LW	Aitor Ariño	19 October 1992 (aged 20)	1.87 m	82	187	(Spain) FC Barcelona
30	P	Gedeón Guardiola	1 October 1984 (aged 28)	1.99 m	24	23	(Germany) Rhein-Neckar Löwen

== Statistics ==
=== Coaches representation by country ===
Coaches in bold represent their own country.

Nº	Country	Coaches
2	Croatia	Nenad Kljaić (Saudi Arabia), **Slavko Goluža**
2	France	**Claude Onesta**, Alain Portes (Tunisia)
2	Germany	**Martin Heuberger**, Michael Biegler (Poland)
2	Slovenia	**Boris Denič**, Borut Maček (Qatar)
2	Spain	Jordi Ribera (Brazil), **Valero Rivera**
1	Algeria	**Salah Bouchekriou**
1	Argentina	**Eduardo Gallardo**
1	Australia	**Taip Ramadani**
1	Belarus	**Yuri Shevtsov**
1	Chile	**Fernando Capurro**
1	Denmark	**Ulrik Wilbek**
1	Egypt	**Assem Daoud**
1	Hungary	**Lajos Mocsai**
1	Iceland	**Aron Kristjánsson**
1	(North Macedonia) Macedonia	**Zvonko Šundovski**
1	Montenegro	**Zoran Kastratović**
1	Russia	**Oleg Kuleshov** / **Aleksandr Rymanov**
1	Serbia	**Veselin Vuković**
1	South Korea	**Lee Sang-sup**
