= 2014 European Men's Handball Championship squads =

Every team has to submit a roster of 16 players. On 12 December 2013 an official squad list was published.

== Group A ==
=== Austria ===
Head coach: (Iceland) Patrekur Jóhannesson

A 14-player squad was announced on 27 December 2013, while a 20-player roster was published on 31 December 2013. An 18-player squad was announced on 8 January 2014.

No.	Pos.	Name	Date of birth (age)	Height	App.	Goals	Club
1	GK	Thomas Bauer	24 January 1986 (aged 27)	1.90 m	71	0	(Germany) TBV Lemgo
3	P	Patrick Fölser	16 November 1976 (aged 37)	1.93 m	213	561	(Austria) SG West Wien
4	RB	Maximilian Hermann	12 October 1991 (aged 22)	1.94 m	17	27	(Germany) Bergischer HC
5	CB	Vytautas Žiūra	11 May 1979 (aged 34)	1.89 m	61	140	(Austria) Fivers Margareten
6	CB	Dominik Schmid	7 September 1989 (aged 24)	1.93 m	19	15	(Austria) Alpla HC Hard
7	RB	Janko Bozovic	14 July 1985 (aged 28)	2.04 m	68	176	(Germany) TV Emsdetten
8	RW	Richard Wöss	10 October 1986 (aged 27)	1.85 m	64	101	(Germany) Bergischer HC
12	GK	Nikola Marinovic	29 August 1976 (aged 37)	1.98 m	125	0	(Germany) Frisch Auf Göppingen
14	CB	Viktor Szilágyi	16 September 1978 (aged 35)	1.95 m	174	804	(Germany) Bergischer HC
15	P	Fabian Posch	5 January 1988 (aged 26)	1.98 m	61	74	(Austria) SC Ferlach
17	LW	Konrad Wilczynski	9 February 1982 (aged 31)	1.80 m	127	557	(Austria) SG West Wien
21	LB	Roland Schlinger	17 September 1982 (aged 31)	1.92 m	145	541	(Germany) HBW Balingen-Weilstetten
22	P	Markus Wagesreiter	14 January 1982 (aged 31)	1.98 m	115	98	(Austria) SG West Wien
23	LB	Markus Kolar	12 October 1984 (aged 29)	1.95 m	38	71	(Austria) Fivers Margareten
28	RW	Robert Weber	25 November 1985 (aged 28)	1.79 m	108	413	(Germany) SC Magdeburg
29	P	Dominik Bammer	18 January 1990 (aged 23)	1.92 m	1	0	(Austria) ULZ Schwaz
31	P	Christoph Edelmüller	15 October 1981 (aged 32)	1.82 m	8	10	(Austria) Fivers Margareten
92	LW	Raul Santos	1 June 1992 (aged 21)	1.80 m	25	114	(Germany) VfL Gummersbach

=== Czech Republic ===
Head coach: Vladimír Haber

The squad was announced on 28 December 2013.

No.	Pos.	Name	Date of birth (age)	Height	App.	Goals	Club
1	GK	Tomáš Mrkva	20 January 1989 (aged 24)	2.03 m	33	0	(Germany) ASV Hamm Westfalen
2	LW	Jakub Hrstka	17 March 1990 (aged 23)	1.86 m	34	104	(Slovakia) Tatran Prešov
3	CB	Roman Bečvář	18 April 1989 (aged 24)	1.91 m	41	120	(Germany) Empor Rostock
5	LW	Miroslav Jurka	7 June 1987 (aged 26)	1.89 m	24	35	(France) Saint-Raphaël VHB
7	LB	Daniel Kubeš	7 February 1978 (aged 35)	2.00 m	130	208	(Germany) MT Melsungen
8	RW	Marek Vančo	10 July 1983 (aged 30)	1.80 m	8	14	(Czech Republic) HCB Karviná
9	LB	Filip Jícha	19 April 1982 (aged 31)	2.01 m	140	776	(Germany) THW Kiel
11	RW	Jan Sobol	22 May 1984 (aged 29)	1.88 m	91	257	(Poland) Azoty-Puławy
13	LB	Pavel Horák	28 November 1982 (aged 31)	1.98 m	70	226	(Germany) Füchse Berlin
15	LB	Alois Mráz	8 September 1978 (aged 35)	1.96 m	133	310	(Germany) TV Hüttenberg
18	RB	Jan Stehlík	18 April 1985 (aged 28)	1.88 m	51	85	(France) Saint-Raphaël VHB
19	CB	Tomáš Babák	28 December 1993 (aged 20)	1.86 m	4	3	(Switzerland) TSV St. Otmar St. Gallen
22	CB	Tomáš Sklenák	2 March 1982 (aged 31)	1.86 m	48	137	(Germany) ThSV Eisenach
32	P	Jakub Šindelář	20 November 1986 (aged 27)	1.95 m	5	3	(Czech Republic) SSK Talent 90 Plzeň
41	LB	Michal Kasal	3 April 1994 (aged 19)	2.09 m	6	1	(Spain) FC Barcelona
71	GK	Petr Štochl	24 April 1976 (aged 37)	1.93 m	170	2	(Germany) Füchse Berlin

=== Denmark ===
Head coach: Ulrik Wilbek

An 18-player squad was announced on 9 December 2013. The final roster was published on 10 January 2014.

No.	Pos.	Name	Date of birth (age)	Height	App.	Goals	Club
1	GK	Niklas Landin Jacobsen	19 December 1988 (aged 25)	2.00 m	92	1	(Germany) Rhein-Neckar Löwen
2	CB	Thomas Mogensen	30 January 1983 (aged 30)	1.87 m	95	234	(Germany) SG Flensburg-Handewitt
3	RB	Mads Christiansen	3 May 1986 (aged 27)	1.94 m	56	110	(Denmark) Bjerringbro-Silkeborg
4	LB	Klaus Thomsen	26 April 1986 (aged 27)	1.98 m	4	0	(Denmark) Team Tvis Holstebro
5	LB	Mads Mensah Larsen	12 August 1991 (aged 22)	1.88 m	23	55	(Denmark) Aalborg
6	LW	Casper Ulrich Mortensen	14 December 1989 (aged 24)	1.90 m	25	73	(Denmark) Bjerringbro-Silkeborg
7	LW	Anders Eggert	14 May 1982 (aged 31)	1.79 m	116	444	(Germany) SG Flensburg-Handewitt
13	CB	Bo Spellerberg	24 July 1979 (aged 34)	1.92 m	215	298	(Denmark) KIF Kolding København
14	P	Michael V. Knudsen	4 September 1978 (aged 35)	1.92 m	231	772	(Germany) SG Flensburg-Handewitt
15	P	Jesper Nøddesbo	23 October 1980 (aged 33)	1.99 m	153	328	(Spain) FC Barcelona
16	GK	Jannick Green	29 September 1989 (aged 24)	1.95 m	31	0	(Denmark) Bjerringbro-Silkeborg
17	RW	Lasse Svan Hansen	31 August 1983 (aged 30)	1.84 m	107	201	(Germany) SG Flensburg-Handewitt
18	RW	Hans Lindberg	1 August 1981 (aged 32)	1.88 m	176	501	(Germany) HSV Hamburg
19	P	Rene Toft Hansen	1 November 1984 (aged 29)	2.00 m	72	117	(Germany) THW Kiel
21	LB	Henrik Møllgaard	2 January 1985 (aged 29)	1.96 m	42	85	(Denmark) Skjern
22	RB	Kasper Søndergaard	9 June 1981 (aged 32)	1.92 m	131	290	(Denmark) Skjern
24	LB	Mikkel Hansen	22 October 1987 (aged 26)	1.92 m	103	486	(France) Paris Saint-Germain

=== Macedonia ===
Head coach: (Croatia) Ivica Obrvan

No.	Pos.	Name	Date of birth (age)	Height	App.	Goals	Club
3	LW	Dejan Manaskov	26 August 1992 (aged 21)	1.80 m	16	15	(North Macedonia) Metalurg Skopje
5	P	Stojanče Stoilov	30 April 1987 (aged 26)	1.92 m	13	17	(North Macedonia) Vardar
7	RB	Kiril Lazarov	10 May 1980 (aged 33)	1.93 m	99	823	(Spain) FC Barcelona
8	RB	Vlatko Mitkov	10 August 1981 (aged 32)	1.92 m	73	65	(Austria) UHK Krems
9	CB	Aco Jonovski	29 December 1980 (aged 33)	1.97 m	56	67	(North Macedonia) Metalurg Skopje
10	CB	Branislav Angelovski	21 February 1977 (aged 36)	1.92 m	78	153	(Romania) H.C.M. Constanța
13	CB	Filip Mirkulovski	14 September 1983 (aged 30)	1.89 m	106	259	(North Macedonia) Metalurg Skopje
14	LB	Velko Markoski	5 April 1986 (aged 27)	1.94 m	25	46	(North Macedonia) Metalurg Skopje
15	RW	Zlatko Mojsoski	15 November 1981 (aged 32)	1.80 m	17	31	(North Macedonia) Metalurg Skopje
16	GK	Borko Ristovski	2 November 1982 (aged 31)	1.90 m	102	3	(Germany) VfL Gummersbach
17	P	Nikola Markoski	22 May 1990 (aged 23)	1.96 m	11	6	(North Macedonia) Metalurg Skopje
19	P	Vancho Dimovski	4 April 1979 (aged 34)	1.87 m	79	203	(North Macedonia) Metalurg Skopje
20	GK	Petar Angelov	8 March 1977 (aged 36)	1.85 m	34	0	(North Macedonia) Vardar
21	CB	Nemanja Pribak	26 March 1984 (aged 29)	1.90 m	0	0	(North Macedonia) Vardar
22	RW	Goce Georgievski	12 February 1992 (aged 21)	1.85 m	21	23	(North Macedonia) Metalurg Skopje
25	CB	Nikola Stojčevski	9 August 1984 (aged 29)	1.96 m	22	30	(Sweden) Redbergslids IK
26	LW	Goce Ojleski	10 October 1989 (aged 24)	1.88 m	5	4	(North Macedonia) Metalurg Skopje
28	LB	Dejan Pecakovski	12 January 1986 (aged 28)	1.93 m	26	29	(North Macedonia) Metalurg Skopje

== Group B ==
=== Hungary ===
Head coach: Lajos Mocsai

A 22-player squad was announced on 20 December 2013.

No.	Pos.	Name	Date of birth (age)	Height	App.	Goals	Club
3	LB	Ferenc Ilyés	20 December 1981 (aged 32)	1.98 m	184	472	(Hungary) Pick Szeged
4	P	Szabolcs Szöllősi	28 January 1989 (aged 24)	1.94 m	35	50	(Hungary) Csurgó
5	P	Timuzsin Schuch	5 June 1985 (aged 28)	1.97 m	99	60	(Hungary) MKB-MVM Veszprém
6	RB	Tamás Mocsai	9 December 1978 (aged 35)	1.96 m	179	423	(Germany) TSV Hannover-Burgdorf
7	CB	Gábor Császár	16 June 1984 (aged 29)	1.86 m	186	655	(France) Paris Saint-Germain
8	LW	Gergő Iváncsik	30 November 1981 (aged 32)	1.90 m	231	619	(Hungary) MKB-MVM Veszprém
11	LB	Barna Putics	18 August 1984 (aged 29)	2.01 m	78	172	(Germany) VfL Gummersbach
12	GK	Péter Tatai	23 June 1983 (aged 30)	1.95 m	74	0	(Hungary) Pick Szeged
16	GK	Roland Mikler	20 September 1984 (aged 29)	1.90 m	122	0	(Hungary) Pick Szeged
18	CB	Kornél Nagy	21 November 1986 (aged 27)	1.95 m	96	152	(France) Dunkerque
20	RW	Péter Gulyás	4 March 1984 (aged 29)	2.00 m	83	175	(Hungary) MKB-MVM Veszprém
24	LW	Attila Vadkerti	22 February 1982 (aged 31)	1.82 m	94	124	(Hungary) Pick Szeged
25	P	Szabolcs Zubai	31 March 1984 (aged 29)	1.91 m	160	253	(Hungary) Pick Szeged
29	LB	Bence Zdolik	16 May 1992 (aged 21)	1.98 m	2	6	(Hungary) Balatonfüred
31	RW	Gábor Szalafai	13 April 1985 (aged 28)	1.94 m	10	10	(Hungary) Gyöngyös
33	RB	Gábor Ancsin	27 November 1990 (aged 23)	2.02 m	39	56	(Hungary) Pick Szeged
66	CB	Máté Lékai	16 June 1988 (aged 25)	1.90 m	65	127	(Slovenia) Celje

=== Iceland ===
Head coach: Aron Kristjánsson

A 21-player squad was announced on 17 December 2013. The squad was announced on 9 January 2014.

No.	Pos.	Name	Date of birth (age)	Height	App.	Goals	Club
1	GK	Björgvin Páll Gústavsson	24 May 1985 (aged 28)	1.93 m	130	3	(Germany) Bergischer HC
2	P	Vignir Svavarsson	20 June 1980 (aged 33)	1.94 m	0	0	(Germany) GWD Minden
3	P	Kári Kristjánsson	23 April 1981 (aged 32)	1.98 m	69	79	(Denmark) Bjerringbro-Silkeborg
4	CB	Aron Pálmarsson	19 July 1990 (aged 23)	1.93 m	76	277	(Germany) THW Kiel
6	RB	Ásgeir Örn Hallgrímsson	17 February 1984 (aged 29)	1.91 m	187	270	(France) Paris Saint-Germain
7	LB	Arnór Atlason	23 July 1984 (aged 29)	1.91 m	141	341	(France) Saint-Raphaël VHB
8	RW	Þórir Ólafsson	28 November 1979 (aged 34)	1.89 m	93	224	(Poland) Vive Targi Kielce
9	LB	Guðjón Valur Sigurðsson	8 August 1979 (aged 34)	1.87 m	286	1483	(Germany) THW Kiel
10	CB	Snorri Guðjónsson	17 October 1981 (aged 32)	1.87 m	214	756	(Denmark) GOG Svendborg
12	GK	Aron Rafn Eðvarðsson	1 September 1989 (aged 24)	2.02 m	21	0	(Sweden) Eskilstuna Guif
13	LB	Ólafur Guðmundsson	13 May 1990 (aged 23)	1.94 m	41	28	(Sweden) IFK Kristianstad
14	RW	Arnór Þór Gunnarsson	23 October 1987 (aged 26)	1.81 m	23	58	(Germany) Bergischer HC
17	P	Sverre Andreas Jakobsson	8 February 1977 (aged 36)	1.96 m	49	27	(Germany) TV Großwallstadt
18	P	Róbert Gunnarsson	22 May 1980 (aged 33)	1.90 m	228	677	(France) Paris Saint-Germain
19	RB	Rúnar Kárason	24 May 1988 (aged 25)	1.96 m	38	71	(Germany) TSV Hannover-Burgdorf
22	LB	Stefán Rafn Sigurmannsson	19 May 1990 (aged 23)	1.96 m	17	11	(Germany) Rhein-Neckar Löwen
26	P	Bjarki Már Gunnarsson	10 August 1988 (aged 25)	2.01 m	3	0	(Germany) EHV Aue
27	CB	Gunnar Steinn Jonsson	4 May 1987 (aged 26)	1.95 m	0	0	(France) Nantes

=== Norway ===
Head coach: (Sweden) Robert Hedin

An 18-player squad was announced on 11 December 2013.

No.	Pos.	Name	Date of birth (age)	Height	App.	Goals	Club
1	GK	Magnus Dahl	28 September 1988 (aged 25)	1.97 m	43	0	(Germany) HSG Wetzlar
3	CB	Sander Sagosen	14 September 1995 (aged 18)	1.92 m	3	6	(Norway) Haslum HK
7	P	Joakim Hykkerud	10 February 1986 (aged 27)	1.94 m	22	34	(Germany) TSV Hannover-Burgdorf
8	P	Bjarte Myrhol	29 May 1982 (aged 31)	1.94 m	149	432	(Germany) Rhein-Neckar Löwen
9	CB	Børge Lund	13 March 1979 (aged 34)	1.96 m	204	389	(Norway) Bodø HK
10	LW	Håvard Tvedten	29 June 1978 (aged 35)	1.83 m	202	790	(Denmark) Aalborg
11	LB	Erlend Mamelund	1 May 1984 (aged 29)	1.97 m	112	348	(Norway) Haslum HK
12	GK	Ole Erevik	9 January 1981 (aged 33)	1.96 m	149	0	(Denmark) Aalborg
13	RB	Christoffer Rambo	18 November 1989 (aged 24)	1.99 m	73	190	(Germany) GWD Minden
15	RB	Kent Robin Tønnesen	5 June 1991 (aged 22)	1.96 m	33	66	(Germany) HSG Wetzlar
18	CB	Christian O'Sullivan	22 August 1991 (aged 22)	1.90 m	18	13	(Norway) Bækkelagets SK
19	RW	Kristian Bjørnsen	10 January 1989 (aged 25)	1.92 m	18	68	(Norway) FyllingenBergen
20	LW	André Lindboe	3 November 1988 (aged 25)	1.83 m	11	42	(Norway) Elverum
21	P	Magnus Gullerud	13 November 1991 (aged 22)	1.96 m	24	28	(Denmark) SønderjyskE
24	LB	Kristian Kjelling	6 September 1980 (aged 33)	1.97 m	154	600	(Denmark) Bjerringbro-Silkeborg
27	RB	Harald Reinkind	17 August 1992 (aged 21)	1.96 m	16	23	(Norway) FyllingenBergen
29	RW	Steffen Berg Løkkebø	3 November 1987 (aged 26)	1.80 m	5	10	(Germany) TV Emsdetten
89	LB	Espen Lie Hansen	1 March 1989 (aged 24)	1.96 m	61	196	(France) Dunkerque

=== Spain ===
Head coach: Manolo Cadenas

The squad was announced on 11 December 2013.

No.	Pos.	Name	Date of birth (age)	Height	App.	Goals	Club
3	RB	Eduardo Gurbindo	11 August 1987 (aged 26)	1.94 m	58	83	(Spain) FC Barcelona
4	RW	Albert Rocas	21 June 1982 (aged 31)	1.88 m	150	532	(Denmark) KIF Kolding København
5	RB	Jorge Maqueda	6 December 1988 (aged 25)	1.97 m	73	171	(France) Nantes
8	RW	Víctor Tomás	15 February 1985 (aged 28)	1.78 m	121	390	(Spain) FC Barcelona
9	CB	Raúl Entrerríos	2 December 1981 (aged 32)	1.93 m	172	380	(Spain) FC Barcelona
11	CB	Daniel Sarmiento	25 August 1983 (aged 30)	1.86 m	59	132	(Spain) FC Barcelona
12	GK	José Manuel Sierra	21 May 1978 (aged 35)	1.94 m	101	0	(France) Paris Saint-Germain
13	P	Julen Aguinagalde	8 December 1982 (aged 31)	1.95 m	112	298	(Poland) Vive Targi Kielce
15	LW	Cristian Ugalde	19 October 1987 (aged 26)	1.88 m	91	212	(Hungary) MKB-MVM Veszprém
19	P	Juan Andreu	20 January 1985 (aged 28)	1.97 m	24	50	(Germany) TSV Hannover-Burgdorf
21	CB	Joan Cañellas	30 September 1986 (aged 27)	1.98 m	92	214	(Germany) HSV Hamburg
24	LB	Viran Morros	15 December 1983 (aged 30)	1.99 m	125	124	(Spain) FC Barcelona
25	LB	Carlos Ruesga	10 March 1985 (aged 28)	1.84 m	62	128	(Hungary) MKB-MVM Veszprém
26	LB	Antonio García Robledo	6 March 1984 (aged 29)	1.91 m	35	64	(France) Paris Saint-Germain
28	LW	Valero Rivera	22 February 1985 (aged 28)	1.85 m	31	90	(France) Nantes
30	P	Gedeón Guardiola	1 October 1984 (aged 29)	2.00 m	49	62	(Germany) Rhein-Neckar Löwen
33	GK	Gonzalo Pérez de Vargas	10 January 1991 (aged 23)	1.89 m	11	0	(France) Fenix Toulouse

== Group C ==
=== France ===
Head coach: Claude Onesta

A 20-player squad was announced on 11 December 2013. The squad was announced on 8 January 2014.

No.	Pos.	Name	Date of birth (age)	Height	App.	Goals	Club
1	GK	Cyril Dumoulin	2 February 1984 (aged 29)	1.99 m	21	0	(France) Chambéry
2	LB	Jérôme Fernandez	7 March 1977 (aged 36)	1.99 m	360	1406	(France) Fenix Toulouse
7	P	Igor Anić	12 June 1987 (aged 26)	1.94 m	9	15	(France) Cesson-Rennes
8	CB	Daniel Narcisse	16 December 1979 (aged 34)	1.89 m	246	775	(France) Paris Saint-Germain
9	RW	Guillaume Joli	27 March 1985 (aged 28)	1.78 m	82	228	(France) Dunkerque
10	RB	Alix Nyokas	28 June 1986 (aged 27)	1.88 m	11	147	(France) Chambéry
11	LW	Samuel Honrubia	5 July 1986 (aged 27)	1.80 m	50	147	(France) Paris Saint-Germain
12	GK	Vincent Gérard	16 December 1986 (aged 27)	1.88 m	3	0	(France) Dunkerque
13	CB	Nikola Karabatić	11 April 1984 (aged 29)	1.96 m	213	882	(Spain) FC Barcelona
15	LB	Mathieu Grébille	6 October 1991 (aged 22)	1.98 m	6	10	(France) Montpellier
16	GK	Thierry Omeyer	2 November 1976 (aged 37)	1.92 m	294	0	(France) Montpellier
18	LB	William Accambray	8 April 1988 (aged 25)	1.94 m	56	156	(France) Montpellier
19	RW	Luc Abalo	6 September 1984 (aged 29)	1.82 m	170	573	(France) Paris Saint-Germain
20	P	Cédric Sorhaindo	7 June 1984 (aged 29)	1.92 m	110	208	(Spain) FC Barcelona
21	LW	Michaël Guigou	28 January 1982 (aged 31)	1.79 m	178	623	(France) Montpellier
22	P	Luka Karabatić	19 April 1988 (aged 25)	2.02 m	4	3	(France) Pays d'Aix UCH
28	RW	Valentin Porte	7 September 1990 (aged 23)	1.90 m	11	12	(France) Fenix Toulouse

=== Poland ===
Head coach: (Germany) Michael Biegler

An 18-player squad was announced on 2 January 2014, while the squad was published on 10 January 2014.

No.	Pos.	Name	Date of birth (age)	Height	App.	Goals	Club
1	GK	Sławomir Szmal	1 October 1978 (aged 35)	1.90 m	230	2	(Poland) Vive Targi Kielce
2	CB	Bartłomiej Jaszka	16 June 1983 (aged 30)	1.84 m	142	245	(Germany) Füchse Berlin
3	RB	Krzysztof Lijewski	7 July 1983 (aged 30)	1.98 m	134	282	(Poland) Vive Targi Kielce
4	RW	Patryk Kuchczyński	17 March 1983 (aged 30)	1.82 m	190	401	(Poland) Górnik Zabrze
8	LB	Karol Bielecki	23 January 1982 (aged 31)	2.02 m	194	752	(Poland) Vive Targi Kielce
11	LW	Adam Wiśniewski	24 October 1980 (aged 33)	1.92 m	92	201	(Poland) Wisła Płock
13	P	Bartosz Jurecki	31 January 1979 (aged 34)	1.93 m	181	586	(Germany) SC Magdeburg
15	LB	Michał Jurecki	27 October 1984 (aged 29)	2.02 m	138	351	(Poland) Vive Targi Kielce
16	GK	Piotr Wyszomirski	6 January 1988 (aged 26)	1.93 m	56	0	(Hungary) Csurgó
18	P	Piotr Grabarczyk	31 October 1982 (aged 31)	2.00 m	61	41	(Poland) Vive Targi Kielce
20	LB	Mariusz Jurkiewicz	3 February 1982 (aged 31)	1.98 m	120	180	(Poland) Wisła Płock
23	P	Kamil Syprzak	23 July 1991 (aged 22)	2.08 m	38	51	(Poland) Wisła Płock
29	RW	Jakub Łucak	18 September 1989 (aged 24)	1.81 m	4	2	(Poland) Chrobry Głogów
30	LW	Przemysław Krajewski	20 January 1987 (aged 26)	1.84 m	22	33	(Poland) Azoty-Puławy
31	CB	Michał Kubisztal	23 March 1980 (aged 33)	1.94 m	55	177	(Poland) Górnik Zabrze
43	RW	Robert Orzechowski	20 November 1989 (aged 24)	1.89 m	47	76	(Poland) Górnik Zabrze
45	RB	Michał Szyba	18 March 1988 (aged 25)	1.96 m	9	12	(Poland) Azoty-Puławy
49	LB	Piotr Chrapkowski	24 March 1988 (aged 25)	2.03 m	17	34	(Poland) Vive Targi Kielce

=== Russia ===
Head coach: Oleg Kuleshov

The squad was announced on 25 December 2013.

No.	Pos.	Name	Date of birth (age)	Height	App.	Goals	Club
1	GK	Nikolay Sorokin	23 July 1982 (aged 31)	1.85 m	5	0	(Russia) Permskie Medvedi
4	P	Aleksei Polyakov	16 December 1985 (aged 28)	2.00 m	0	0	(Russia) Zarya Kaspiya Astrakhan
5	P	Alexander Pyshkin	13 April 1987 (aged 26)	1.97 m	4	1	(Russia) Saint Petersburg
6	RB	Daniil Shishkarev	6 July 1988 (aged 25)	1.89 m	13	16	(Russia) Chekhovskiye Medvedi
7	RB	Dmitry Kovalev	15 May 1982 (aged 31)	1.80 m	125	307	(Russia) Chekhovskiye Medvedi
8	P	Egor Evdokimov	9 March 1982 (aged 31)	2.00 m	84	126	(Ukraine) Motor Zaporizhzhia
9	LW	Oleg Skopintsev	15 April 1984 (aged 29)	1.84 m	40	56	(Ukraine) Motor Zaporizhzhia
11	CB	Pavel Atman	25 May 1987 (aged 26)	1.90 m	43	57	(North Macedonia) Metalurg Skopje
12	GK	Vadim Bogdanov	26 March 1986 (aged 27)	1.97 m	17	0	(Belarus) Dinamo Minsk
13	LB	Sergei Gorbok	4 December 1982 (aged 31)	1.96 m	6	35	(Germany) Rhein-Neckar Löwen
16	GK	Igor Levshin	18 August 1974 (aged 39)	1.98 m	41	0	(Russia) Permskie Medvedi
18	LB	Sergey Kudinov	29 June 1991 (aged 22)	1.95 m	0	0	(Russia) Zarya Kaspiya Astrakhan
25	RB	Sergey Shelmenko	5 April 1983 (aged 30)	1.96 m	17	39	(Belarus) Dinamo Minsk
35	RB	Konstantin Igropulo	14 April 1985 (aged 28)	1.90 m	103	498	(Germany) Füchse Berlin
52	CB	Inal Aflitulin	22 March 1988 (aged 25)	1.82 m	3	5	(Ukraine) Motor Zaporizhzhia
69	RB	Samvel Aslanyan	23 February 1986 (aged 27)	1.86 m	70	106	(Russia) Permskie Medvedi
89	CB	Dmitry Zhitnikov	20 November 1989 (aged 24)	1.85 m	13	18	(Russia) Chekhovskiye Medvedi

=== Serbia ===
Head coach: Vladan Matić

A 19-squad was announced on 31 December 2013.

No.	Pos.	Name	Date of birth (age)	Height	App.	Goals	Club
1	GK	Slaviša Đukanović	3 May 1979 (aged 34)	1.90 m	8	0	(France) Saint-Raphaël VHB
6	RB	Marko Vujin	7 December 1984 (aged 29)	1.96 m	104	428	(Germany) THW Kiel
7	LW	Ivan Nikčević	11 February 1981 (aged 32)	1.81 m	118	434	(Poland) Wisła Płock
9	CB	Nikola Manojlović	1 December 1981 (aged 32)	1.95 m	43	40	(Germany) Rhein-Neckar Löwen
11	P	Alem Toskić	12 February 1982 (aged 31)	1.90 m	144	298	(North Macedonia) Vardar
12	GK	Darko Stanić	8 October 1978 (aged 35)	1.92 m	97	0	(North Macedonia) Metalurg Skopje
13	LB	Momir Ilić	22 December 1981 (aged 32)	2.00 m	125	456	(Hungary) MKB-MVM Veszprém
14	RW	Bogdan Radivojević	2 March 1993 (aged 20)	1.86 m	12	17	(Germany) SG Flensburg-Handewitt
16	GK	Strahinja Milić	20 December 1990 (aged 23)	1.98 m	22	0	(North Macedonia) Vardar
17	RW	Rajko Prodanović	24 April 1986 (aged 27)	1.86 m	111	265	(Germany) Rhein-Neckar Löwen
18	P	Rastko Stojković	12 July 1981 (aged 32)	1.91 m	65	138	(Serbia) Crvena zvezda
19	LW	Nemanja Ilić	11 May 1990 (aged 23)	1.77 m	16	15	(France) Fenix Toulouse
20	LB	Momir Rnić	1 November 1987 (aged 26)	1.97 m	68	110	(Germany) Frisch Auf Göppingen
24	CB	Uroš Mitrović	24 January 1984 (aged 29)	1.91 m	30	37	(Switzerland) BSV Bern Muri
25	RB	Nemanja Zelenović	27 February 1990 (aged 23)	1.94 m	19	35	(Slovenia) Celje
30	LB	Draško Nenadić	15 February 1990 (aged 23)	2.02 m	13	14	(Germany) SG Flensburg-Handewitt
31	CB	Petar Nenadić	28 June 1986 (aged 27)	1.98 m	60	134	(Poland) Wisła Płock

== Group D ==
=== Belarus ===
Head coach: Yuri Shevtsov

The squad was announced on 26 December 2013.

No.	Pos.	Name	Date of birth (age)	Height	App.	Goals	Club
1	GK	Kazimir Kotlinski	12 April 1974 (aged 39)	1.92 m	57	0	(Belarus) Victoria Regia
2	LW	Ivan Brouka	20 April 1980 (aged 33)	1.84 m	122	470	(Belarus) Dinamo Minsk
4	P	Maxim Babichev	7 March 1986 (aged 27)	2.00 m	89	139	(Belarus) Dinamo Minsk
6	RB	Viktar Zaitsau	27 August 1992 (aged 21)	2.00 m	0	0	(Belarus) SKA Minsk
8	LB	Dzmitry Kamyshyk	1 May 1990 (aged 23)	2.00 m	46	109	(Belarus) SKA Minsk
9	RB	Aleh Astrashapkin	20 January 1992 (aged 21)	1.88 m	0	0	(Belarus) Meshkov Brest
10	CB	Barys Pukhouski	3 January 1987 (aged 27)	1.84 m	103	433	(Hungary) Csurgó
12	GK	Aliaksei Kishou	23 September 1986 (aged 27)	1.92 m	29	1	(Russia) Saint Petersburg
14	LB	Siarhei Rutenka	29 August 1981 (aged 32)	1.98 m	37	238	(Spain) FC Barcelona
15	RW	Dzianis Rutenka	14 February 1986 (aged 27)	1.90 m	55	126	(Belarus) Dinamo Minsk
17	CB	Dzmitry Nikulenkau	12 July 1984 (aged 29)	1.88 m	47	87	(Belarus) Dinamo Minsk
18	RB	Siarhei Shylovich	16 May 1986 (aged 27)	1.95 m	64	200	(Poland) Pogoń Szczecin
19	P	Mikhail Niazhura	9 December 1980 (aged 33)	2.00 m	44	8	(Belarus) Victoria Regia
20	LB	Dzmitry Chystabayeu	23 December 1986 (aged 27)	2.00 m	50	35	(Russia) Permskie Medvedi
21	GK	Vitali Charapenka	27 January 1984 (aged 29)	1.93 m	42	0	(Belarus) Meshkov Brest
24	RW	Maksim Baranau	11 April 1988 (aged 25)	1.88 m	64	166	(Belarus) Meshkov Brest
55	P	Aliaksandr Tsitou	28 October 1986 (aged 27)	1.90 m	0	0	(Ukraine) Motor Zaporizhzhia
86	RB	Evgeny Semenov	16 July 1986 (aged 27)	1.96 m	0	0	(Russia) Permskie Medvedi

=== Croatia ===
Head coach: Slavko Goluža

An 18-player squad was announced on 10 January 2014.

No.	Pos.	Name	Date of birth (age)	Height	App.	Goals	Club
1	GK	Venio Losert	25 July 1976 (aged 37)	1.91 m	211	0	(Poland) Vive Targi Kielce
5	CB	Domagoj Duvnjak	1 June 1988 (aged 25)	1.97 m	127	377	(Germany) HSV Hamburg
8	RB	Marko Kopljar	12 February 1986 (aged 27)	2.10 m	93	164	(France) Paris Saint-Germain
9	P	Igor Vori	20 September 1980 (aged 33)	2.03 m	209	540	(France) Paris Saint-Germain
10	LB	Jakov Gojun	18 April 1986 (aged 27)	2.04 m	92	54	(France) Paris Saint-Germain
13	RW	Zlatko Horvat	25 September 1984 (aged 29)	1.79 m	86	198	(Croatia) Zagreb
14	CB	Drago Vuković	3 August 1983 (aged 30)	1.94 m	121	188	(Germany) TuS N-Lübbecke
20	LB	Damir Bičanić	25 June 1985 (aged 28)	1.94 m	63	113	(France) Chambéry
21	RB	Denis Buntić	13 October 1982 (aged 31)	1.99 m	116	261	(Poland) Vive Targi Kielce
22	CB	Josip Valčić	21 April 1984 (aged 29)	1.90 m	30	23	(Croatia) Zagreb
23	LB	Stipe Mandalinić	9 September 1992 (aged 21)	1.95 m	11	12	(Croatia) Zagreb
25	GK	Mirko Alilović	15 September 1985 (aged 28)	2.00 m	125	0	(Hungary) MKB-MVM Veszprém
26	LW	Manuel Štrlek	1 December 1988 (aged 25)	1.81 m	66	204	(Poland) Vive Targi Kielce
27	RW	Ivan Čupić	27 March 1986 (aged 27)	1.78 m	85	332	(Poland) Vive Targi Kielce
28	P	Željko Musa	8 January 1986 (aged 28)	2.00 m	59	32	(Poland) Vive Targi Kielce
29	LW	Ivan Ninčević	27 October 1981 (aged 32)	1.84 m	53	91	(Belarus) Dinamo Minsk
32	LB	Ivan Slišković	23 October 1991 (aged 22)	1.97 m	9	23	(Slovenia) Celje

=== Montenegro ===
Head coach: Zoran Kastratović

A 22-player squad was announced on 13 December 2013.

No.	Pos.	Name	Date of birth (age)	Height	App.	Goals	Club
1	GK	Rade Mijatović	30 June 1981 (aged 32)	1.92 m	39	0	(North Macedonia) Metalurg Skopje
2	P	Mladen Rakčević	10 February 1982 (aged 31)	1.79 m	47	158	(Greece) AEK Athens
3	LB	Vuko Borozan	9 April 1994 (aged 19)	2.03 m	0	0	(Croatia) Karlovac
5	CB	Mirko Milašević	27 July 1985 (aged 28)	1.96 m	33	27	(France) Billère
7	RB	Vladan Lipovina	7 March 1993 (aged 20)	2.01 m	0	0	(Spain) Ciudad Encantada
11	LW	Igor Marković	16 December 1981 (aged 32)	1.83 m	50	93	(Montenegro) Lovćen
13	RW	Mirko Radović	15 June 1990 (aged 23)	1.86 m	2	1	(Montenegro) Lovćen
14	LW	Miloš Vujović	5 September 1993 (aged 20)	1.81 m	7	10	(Montenegro) Lovćen
16	GK	Nebojša Simić	9 January 1993 (aged 21)	1.92 m	17	0	(Sweden) HK Malmö
17	P	Nemanja Grbović	26 April 1990 (aged 23)	1.83 m	18	15	(Serbia) Crvena zvezda
18	CB	Žarko Pejović	25 January 1986 (aged 27)	1.91 m	15	14	(Slovakia) Tatran Prešov
20	CB	Stevan Vujović	7 April 1990 (aged 23)	1.90 m	27	52	(France) Sélestat
21	LB	Vasko Ševaljević	21 June 1988 (aged 25)	1.93 m	24	70	(Germany) TSV Hannover-Burgdorf
22	RB	Danilo Perišić	24 April 1990 (aged 23)	1.90 m	7	8	(Hungary) Cegléd
23	CB	Bogdan Petričević	6 September 1989 (aged 24)	1.94 m	0	0	(France) Valence
24	RB	Marko Simović	19 February 1987 (aged 26)	1.93 m	14	10	(Turkey) Çankaya Bel. Ankara
25	RW	Marko Lasica	30 April 1988 (aged 25)	1.88 m	22	17	(Hungary) Pick Szeged

=== Sweden ===
Head coach: Staffan Olsson / Ola Lindgren

The squad was announced on 10 December 2013.

No.	Pos.	Name	Date of birth (age)	Height	App.	Goals	Club
1	GK	Mattias Andersson	29 March 1978 (aged 35)	1.85 m	93	0	(Germany) SG Flensburg-Handewitt
2	RB	Magnus Persson	17 December 1990 (aged 23)	1.92 m	3	6	(Sweden) HK Drott
6	LW	Jonas Källman	17 July 1981 (aged 32)	2.00 m	174	529	(Sweden) IFK Skövde
7	P	Magnus Jernemyr	18 July 1976 (aged 37)	1.98 m	105	5	(Sweden) LUGI HF
8	CB	Lukas Karlsson	21 May 1982 (aged 31)	1.78 m	65	117	(Denmark) KIF Kolding København
10	RW	Niclas Ekberg	23 December 1988 (aged 25)	1.91 m	87	380	(Germany) THW Kiel
15	LB	Jonas Larholm	3 June 1982 (aged 31)	1.93 m	200	628	(Hungary) Pick Szeged
18	P	Tobias Karlsson	4 June 1981 (aged 32)	1.96 m	129	76	(Germany) SG Flensburg-Handewitt
19	RB	Johan Jakobsson	12 February 1987 (aged 26)	1.95 m	68	106	(Denmark) Aalborg
21	CB	Patrik Fahlgren	27 June 1985 (aged 28)	1.88 m	26	44	(Germany) MT Melsungen
22	GK	Johan Sjöstrand	26 February 1987 (aged 26)	1.95 m	75	0	(Germany) THW Kiel
24	LW	Fredrik Petersen	23 August 1983 (aged 30)	1.88 m	101	265	(Germany) Füchse Berlin
25	LB	Kim Ekdahl du Rietz	27 March 1989 (aged 24)	1.94 m	64	186	(Germany) Rhein-Neckar Löwen
32	RW	Mattias Zachrisson	22 August 1990 (aged 23)	1.79 m	36	56	(Germany) Füchse Berlin
35	P	Andreas Nilsson	12 April 1990 (aged 23)	1.97 m	46	101	(Germany) HSV Hamburg
36	P	Jesper Nielsen	30 August 1989 (aged 24)	2.00 m	18	16	(Germany) Füchse Berlin

== Statistics ==
=== Player representation by league system ===
In all, World Cup squad members play for clubs in 23 different countries.

Country	Players	Outside national squad
Germany	68	68
France	39	24
Poland	26	11
Hungary	21	9
(North Macedonia) Macedonia	18	5
Denmark	17	9
Belarus	14	3
Russia	12	3
Spain	12	7
Austria	10	1
Norway	7	0
Sweden	7	4
Croatia	4	1
Ukraine	4	4
Montenegro	3	0
Slovenia	3	3
Czech Republic	2	0
Serbia	2	1
Slovakia	2	2
Switzerland	2	2
Greece	1	1
Romania	1	1
Turkey	1	1

Nations in italics are not represented by their national teams in the finals.
French squad have only two player employed by a non-domestic club; that players are employed in Spain. Only Icelandic squad is made up entirely of players employed by overseas clubs; although one player on that squad. Of the countries not represented by a national team at the World Cup, Handball-Bundesliga provides the most squad members.

=== Player representation by club ===
Clubs with 10 or more players represented are listed.

Club	Players
(North Macedonia) Metalurg Skopje	13
(France) Paris Saint-Germain	12
(Spain) FC Barcelona	11
(Poland) Vive Targi Kielce	11

=== Coaches representation by country ===
Coaches in bold represent their own country.

Nº	Country	Coaches
2	Croatia	**Slavko Goluža**, Ivica Obrvan (Macedonia)
2	Iceland	Patrekur Jóhannesson (Austria), **Aron Kristjánsson**
2	Sweden	Robert Hedin (Norway), **Ola Lindgren** / **Staffan Olsson**
1	Belarus	**Yuri Shevtsov**
1	Czech Republic	**Vladimír Haber**
1	Denmark	**Ulrik Wilbek**
1	France	**Claude Onesta**
1	Germany	Michael Biegler (Poland)
1	Hungary	**Lajos Mocsai**
1	Montenegro	**Zoran Kastratović**
1	Russia	**Oleg Kuleshov**
1	Serbia	**Vladan Matić**
1	Spain	**Manolo Cadenas**
