= Bjarki Már Gunnarsson =

Icelandic handball player (born 1988)

Personal information
- Nationality: Icelandic
- Born: 10 August 1988 (age 38) Reykjavík, Iceland
- Height: 2.01 m (6 ft 7 in)

Sport
- Sport: Handball
- Position: Pivot
- Current club: Stjarnan
- Number: 5

Senior clubs
- Years: Team
- –2013: HK Kópavogur
- 2013–2017: EHV Aue
- 2017–: UMF Stjarnan
National team
Years	Team	Apps	(Gls)
–	Iceland	64	(17)

Bjarki Már Gunnarsson (born 10 August 1988) is an Icelandic handball player for Stjarnan and the Icelandic national team.

Gunnarsson started playing handball at his local club HK Kópavogs where he won the Icelandic Championship in 2012, before transferring to German second-tier side EHV Aue. In 2017 he moved back to Iceland to play for Stjarnan.
