= Mohamed Alaa =

Egyptian footballer (born 1999)

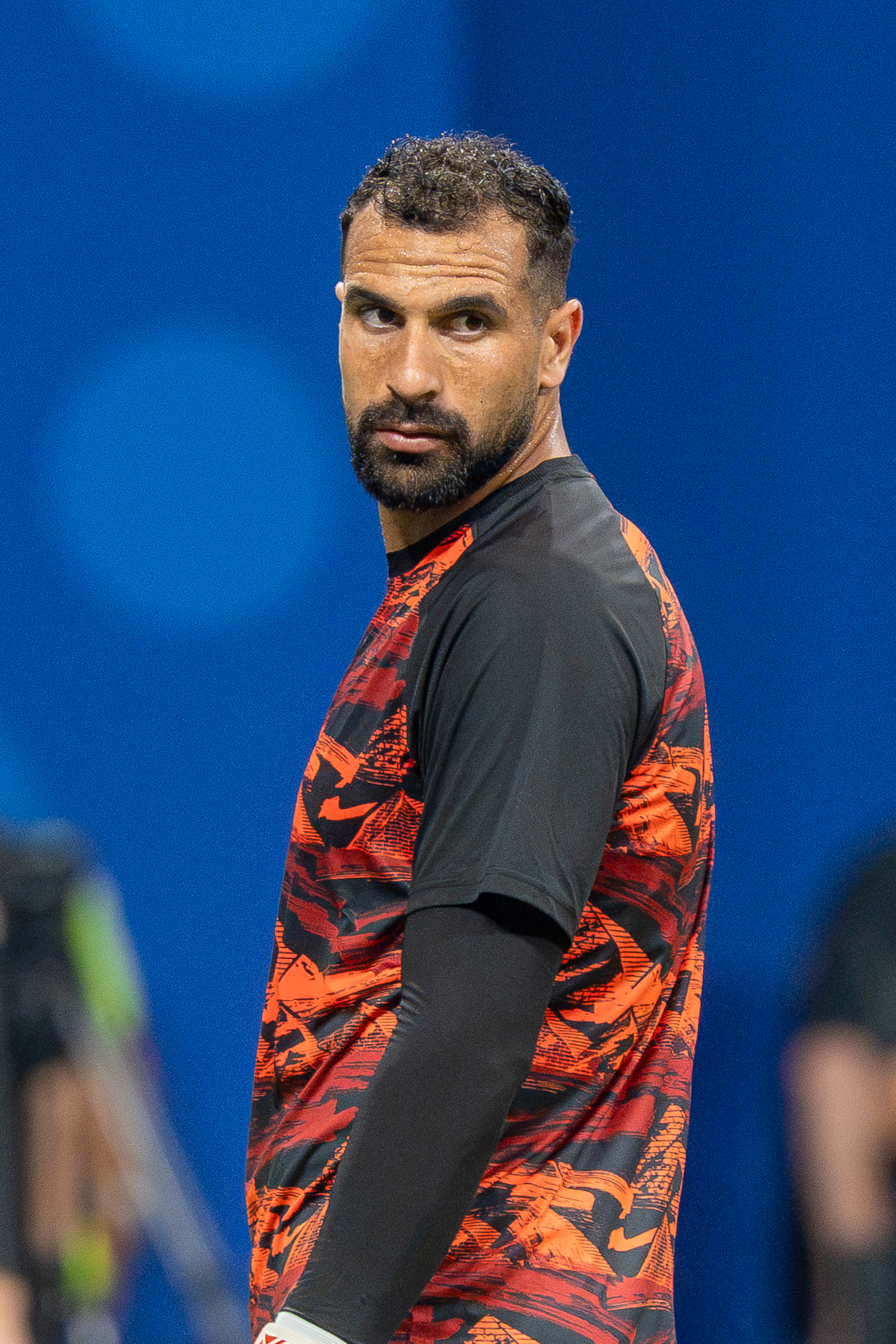
- Alaa with Egypt in 2026

Personal information
- Full name: Mohamed Alaaeldin Soliman M Ahmed
- Date of birth: 1 September 1999 (age 27)
- Place of birth: Ismailia, Egypt
- Height: 1.88 m (6 ft 2 in)
- Position: Goalkeeper

Team information
- Current team: Cleopatra FC

Senior career*
Years	Team	Apps	(Gls)
2024	El Qanah	0	(0)
2024–2026	El Gouna	62	(0)
2026-	Cleopatra FC	0	(0)

International career^{‡}
2026–	Egypt		
- * Club domestic league appearances and goals as of 22:23, 12 August 2026 (UTC) ‡ National team caps and goals as of 17:49, 1 June 2026 (UTC)

Mohamed Alaaeldin Soliman M Ahmed (Note: Arabic: محمد علاء الدين سليمان أحمد) (born 1 September 1999) is an Egyptian professional footballer who plays as a goalkeeper for Egyptian Premier League club Cleopatra FC and the Egypt national team.

== Club career ==
Alaa developed as a goalkeeper in the lower tiers of Egyptian football before establishing himself at El Qanahin the Egyptian Second Division. In July 2024, El Gouna signed him on a three-year contract running until 2027, for a reported fee of 2.5 million Egyptian pounds, after interest from several clubs including Ghazl El Mahalla.

In his debut season in the Egyptian Premier League, Alaa impressed considerably, making 40 league appearances across his first two seasons with the club. During the first half of the 2025–26 season he kept 5 clean sheets in 12 appearances, establishing himself as one of the league's standout goalkeepers. His performances attracted interest from Zamalek and Ceramica Cleopatra ahead of the 2026 summer transfer window.

== International career ==
Alaa was named in Egypt's final 26-man squad for the 2026 FIFA World Cup, to be held in the United States, Canada and Mexico, as one of four goalkeepers selected alongside Mohamed El-Shenawy, Mostafa Shobeir, and El Mahdy Soliman.
