= Borut Maček =

Slovenian handball coach

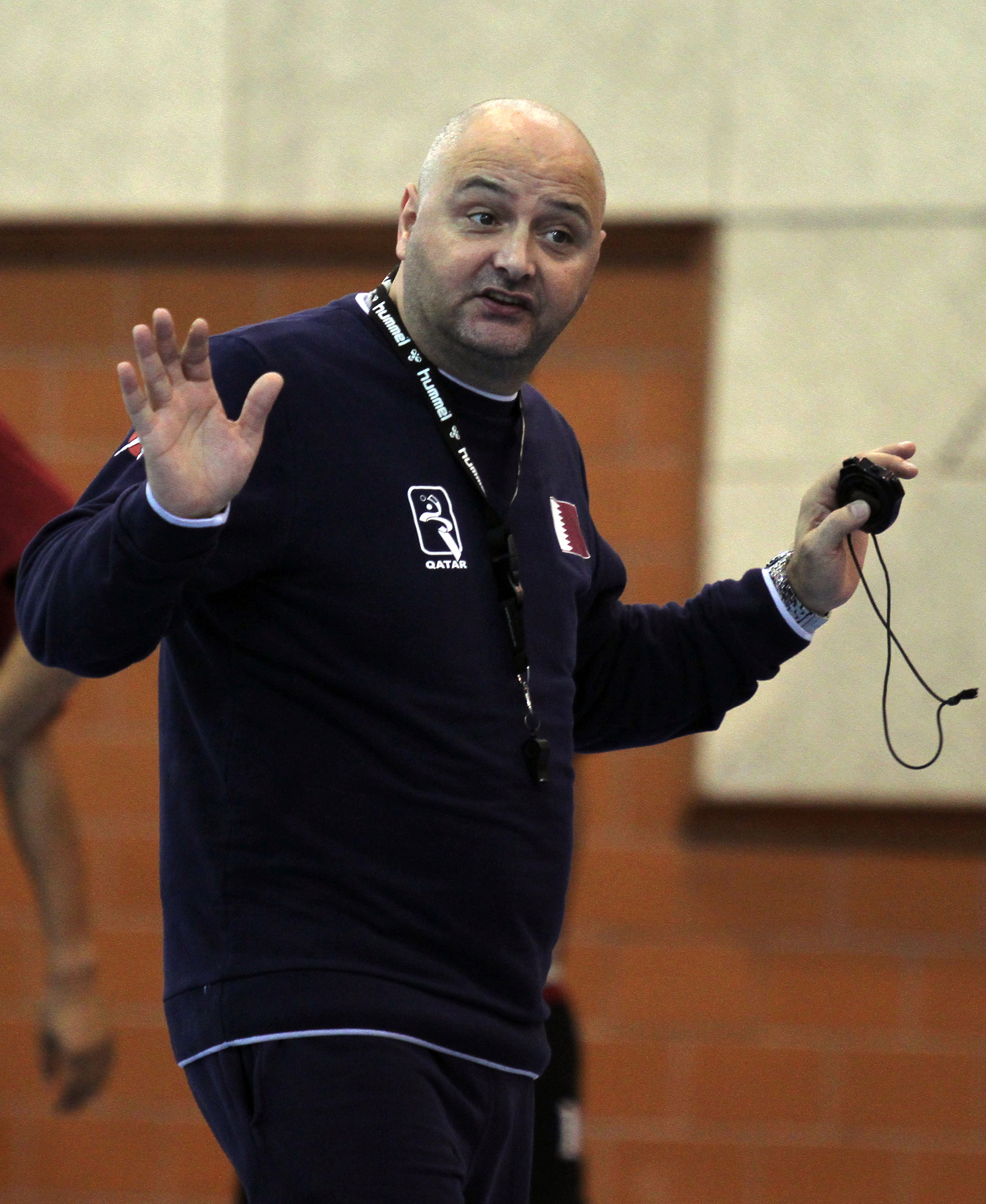
Maček in 2011

Borut Maček (born 11 June 1966) is a Slovenian handball coach. He coached the Iran national team at the 2015 World Men's Handball Championship.
