= Leonel Maciel =

Mexican artist

Leonel Maciel (born March 21, 1939) is a Mexican artist, member of the Salón de la Plástica Mexicana, from the coast of the state of Guerrero. Although from a rural area and farming family, he studied art at the Escuela Nacional de Pintura, Escultura y Grabado "La Esmeralda" and has traveled extensively in Europe and Asia, which has influenced his work. His art has changed styles from generally contains multiple elements and saturated colors.

== Life ==
Maciel was born in the small village of La Soledad de Maciel, located in the municipality of Petatlán, Guerrero on Mexico’s Pacific coast. He was born to a farm working family, in a palapa near the ocean. His family is of mixed African, Asian and indigenous roots, not uncommon for that region, the Costa Grande of Guerrero. He is a tall thin man, from family of tall people, stating that his great-grandparents were two meters tall or taller. One of these was Margarita Romero, called Negra Margarita who was African-indigenous ethnicity.

He spent his early childhood on beaches and among mangroves. He began to draw and paint early, with his father encouraging him even though the region does not have a strong artistic tradition. His father also taught him to appreciate literature and he is fond of Hispanic-American literature and authors such as Alejo Carpentier, Pablo Neruda and Miguel Angel Asturias, which has affected his artistry.

He attended primary school for four years and at age ten went to Mexico City where he attended more classes up to high school but he did not study art although he had been drawing since he was a young child. Instead he worked odd jobs and sold some works that he drew or painted. These came to the attention of the Escuela Nacional de Pintura, Escultura y Grabado "La Esmeralda". He received a scholarship, studying there from 1958 to 1962.

He believes it is necessary for artists to see as much of the world as possible and be exposed to the work of other artists. His first journeys outside of Mexico included New York and Iceland, where he experienced an aurora borealis. He also spent three years in Europe, but did not use the time to visit museums and other artists. In 1995, he made an eight-month journey through Asia in countries such as India, Bali, Thailand, China and Malaysia as well as the various Pacific islands. Elements of what he saw during this trip were then included into his work.

In 2007 he worked on a project to document the cuisine of his native region which inspired a number of paintings.

He lived in Tepoztlán from the 1980s into the 1990s and today he lives in his native Guerrero state.

== Career ==
Maciel has had over forty individual and collective exhibitions of his work in countries such as Brazil, France, the United States and Portugal as well as Mexico. His first individual exhibition was as the Galería Excélsior in 1964. His other individual exhibitions include the Galería Plástica de México in Mexico City (1964), Salón de la Plástica Mexicana (1970), Reykjavik Museum of Contemporary Art (1971), Galería Segrí in New York (1972), Instituto Francés de América Latina in Mexico City (1972), Galería Lourdes Chumacero in Mexico City (1974), Galería Arvil in Mexico City (1974), Galería Uno in Puerto Vallarta (1974), Polyforum Cultural Siqueiros (1974,1981), Museo Mexicano de San Francisco (1974), Picasso Museum in Antibes, France (1979), the Galería Aura in Mexico City (1983), Museo de Arte Contemporaneo in Morelia (1984, 1996), the Palacio de Bellas Artes (1985), the Scott Alan Gallery in New York (1986), Casa del Lago in Mexico City (1988), Hospicio Cabañas in Guadalajara (1990), the Museo de Santa Teresa in Mexico City (1990), Galería Alberto Misrachi in Mexico City (1993, 1995), Galería Irma Valerio in Zacatecas (1994), San Antonio Cultural Center Texas (1996), Museo Guadalupe Posadas in Aguascalientes (1999) and Taller Siqueiros in Cuernavaca (2000), the Museo de la Ciudad de México (2003), Museo Mural Diego Rivera (2011) and the Museo Nacional de San Carlos in 2011.

His important collective exhibitions include “Art-Expo” in New York, Erótica ’82 at the Galería José Clemente Orozco and Contemporary Mexican Painters at the Picasso Museum in Antibes, France. He participated in the Myth and Magic of Latin America Biennal in Rio de Janeiro in 1979.

His work can be found in the collections of the Museo de Arte in Havana, the Museo de Arte Contemporáneo in Managua, Nicaragua, the Modern Art Museum in Reijkiavik and the Museo de Arte Moderno in Mexico City.

Maciel has created illustrations for children’s books and short stories, and for works by Francisco Hinojosa, Nicole Girón and Susana Dubin as well as stage and costume design for the theater.

Recognitions for his work include membership in the Salón de la Plástica Mexicana, retrospectives at the Museo del Carmen in Mexico City (2001) and the Museo de la Ciudad de México (2003) . In 2007 his home municipality had a ceremony to honor him.

== Artistry ==
Maciel began his artistic career in the 1950, and like others of the Generación de la Ruptura, decided to abandon muralism for liberty of expression. Raúl Anguiano classified him as “one of the greats” calling him one of his disciples.

Maciel defines himself as a hedonistic painter believing that, suffering should not rule human existence, but rather eroticism, celebration, play, laughter or, in other words, the sheer joy of living. He tried to transmit this through his painting. He is quoted as saying “What is beautiful in life sometimes is expressed with color, other times with movement and in some cases by means of objects, plants and animals.” Even generally serious topics can have elements of irony. Maciel did a series based on the Passion of Christ. But the images are not always solemn as in traditional depictions.

His works generally contain a number of elements, often in saturated colors which are related to magical realism. Maciel has changed styles frequently and sometimes abruptly, with works showing African influence, others of a very traditional and academic style and ones using symbolic coloring and even hyper-realism. One reason for this is his travel experience, for example the inclusion of Asian elements is work after traveling there in the 1990s. His work varies from abstract to figurative, with his academic training apparent in his experimentation with materials.
