= Aleksei Polyakov =

Russian handball player

Personal information
- Nationality: Russian
- Born: 16 December 1985 (age 40) Tolyatti, Russia
- Height: 2.00 m (6 ft 7 in)

Sport
- Sport: Handball
- Position: Pivot
- Current club: Zarya Kaspiya
- Number: 4
National team
Years	Team	Apps	(Gls)
–	Russia	0	(0)

Aleksei Polyakov (born 16 December 1985) is a Russian handball player for Zarya Kaspiya and the Russian national team.
