= Dzmitry Chystabayeu =

Belarusian handball player

Personal information
- Nationality: Belarusian
- Born: 23 December 1986 (age 39) Babruysk, Byelorussian SSR, Soviet Union
- Height: 2.00 m (6 ft 7 in)

Sport
- Sport: Handball
- Position: Left back
- Current club: Permskie Medvedi
- Number: 23
National team
Years	Team	Apps	(Gls)
–	Belarus	56	(36)

Dzmitry Chystabayeu (born 23 December 1986) is a Belarusian handball player for Permskie Medvedi and the Belarusian national team.
