= Kazimir Kotlinski =

Belarusian handball player

Personal information
- Nationality: Belarusian
- Born: 12 April 1974 (age 52)
- Height: 1.92 m (6 ft 4 in)

Sport
- Sport: Handball
- Position: Goalkeeper
- Current club: Victoria Regia Minsk
- Number: 16
National team
Years	Team	Apps	(Gls)
–	Belarus	57	(0)

Kazimir Kotlinski (born 12 April 1974) is a Belarusian handball player for Victoria Regia Minsk and the Belarusian national team.
