= Aron Kristjánsson =

Icelandic handball player (born 1972)

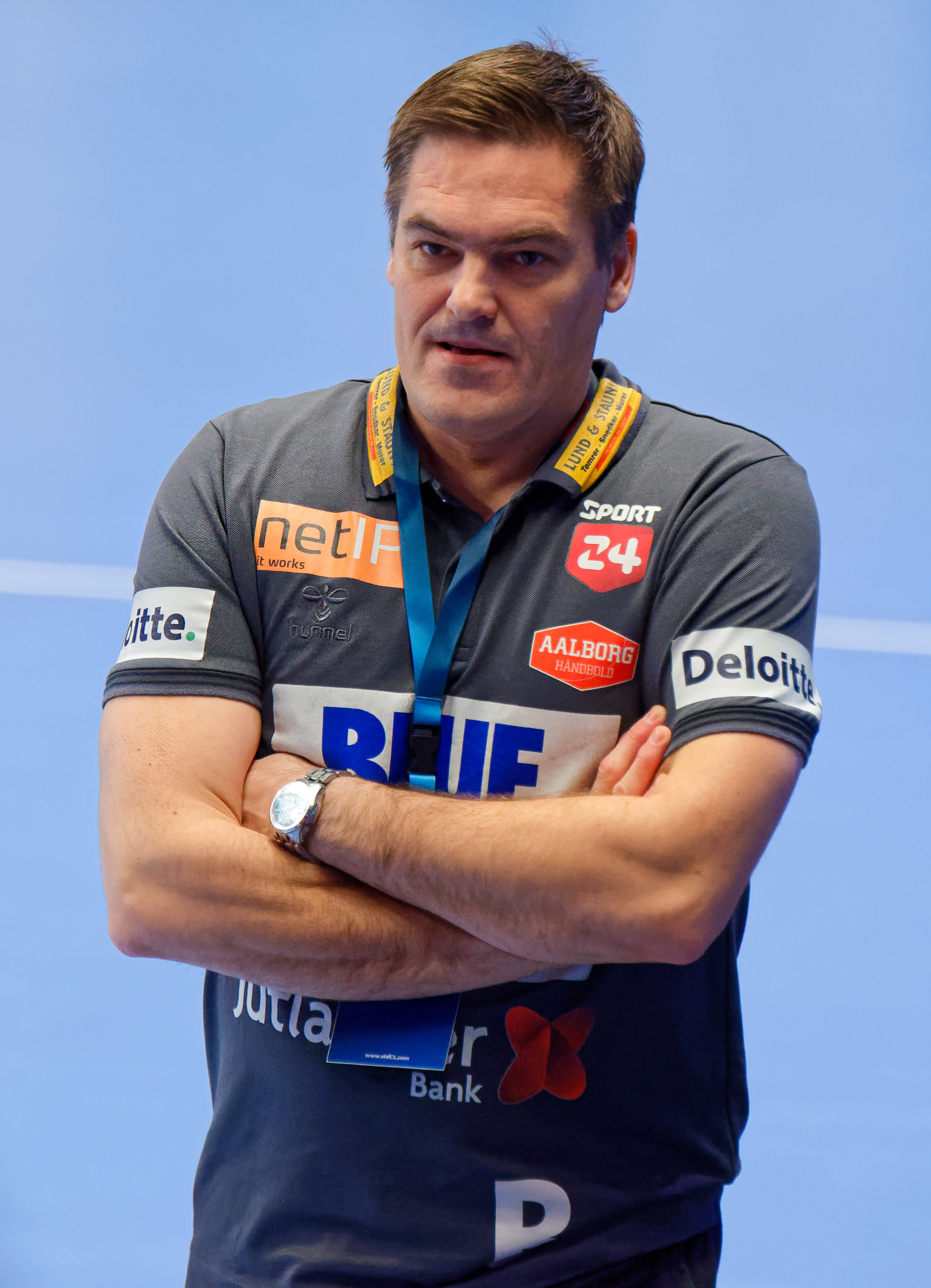
- Kristjánsson in 2017

Personal information
- Nationality: Icelandic
- Born: 14 July 1972 (age 54) Stykkishólmur, Iceland
- Height: 1.83 m (6 ft 0 in)

Sport
- Sport: Handball
- Position: Centre back
- Current club: Kuwait (Manager)

Youth career
- Years: Team
- 1986–1990: Haukar

Senior clubs
- Years: Team
- 1990–1998: Haukar
- 1998–2001: Skjern Håndbold
- 2001–2003: Haukar
- 2003–2004: TTH Holstebro
National team
| Years | Team | Apps | (Gls) |
| 1993–2003 | Iceland | 85 | (128) |

Teams managed
- 2004–2007: Skjern Håndbold
- 2007–2010: Haukar
- 2010–2011: TSV Hannover-Burgdorf
- 2011–2013: Haukar
- 2012–2016: Iceland
- 2014–2015: KIF Kolding
- 2016–2017: Aalborg Håndbold
- 2018–2024: Bahrain
- 2018–2022: Haukar
- 2025-: Kuwait

Aron Kristjánsson (born 14 July 1972) is a former handball player and the current head coach of the Kuwait men's national handball team.

== Career ==
He was the head coach of the Iceland men's national handball team between August 2012 and January 2016. Here he took over from likewise Icelandic Guðmundur Guðmundsson. Incidentally, he also replaced Guðmundur Guðmundsson when he became head coach for Bahrain in 2018.

Before being head coach for Iceland, he coached the Icelandic handball club Haukar, the German top division side TSV Hannover-Burgdorf and Danish side Skjern. On 10 February 2014, it was announced that he would become the head coach of Danish men's side KIF Kolding for the rest of the season. He also stayed on as Iceland's head coach during his time at Kolding.

As a player, he played 85 international matches for Iceland, scoring 128 goals. He was a part of the team that made it to the semi-finals in the European handball championship in 2002.
