= Marko Simović =

Montenegrin handball player (born 1987)

Personal information
- Nationality: Montenegrin
- Born: 19 February 1987 (age 39) Cetinje, Montenegro
- Height: 1.93 m (6 ft 4 in)

Sport
- Sport: Handball
- Position: Right back
- Current club: SCM Politehnica Timișoara
- Number: 77
National team
Years	Team	Apps	(Gls)
–	Montenegro	16	(25)

Marko Simović (born 19 February 1987) is a Montenegrin handball player for Romanian handball team SCM Politehnica Timișoara and the Montenegrin national team.
