= Piotr Grabarczyk =

Polish handball player (born 1982)

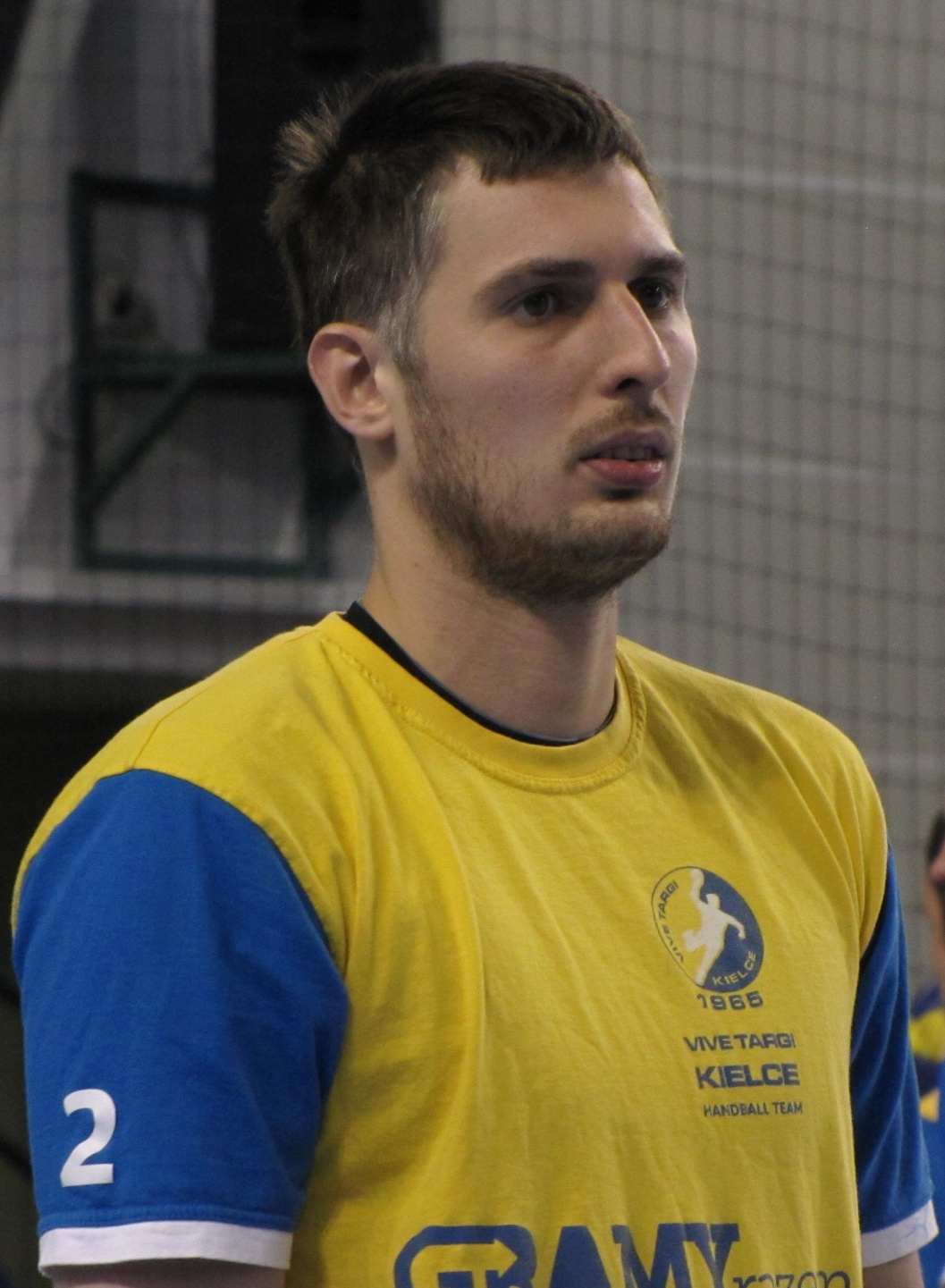
- Grabarczyk in 2011

Personal information
- Nationality: Polish
- Born: 31 October 1982 (age 43) Olsztyn, Poland
- Height: 2.00 m (6 ft 7 in)

Sport
- Sport: Handball
- Position: Pivot

Senior clubs
- Years: Team
- 1996–2001: SMS Gdańsk
- 2001–2015: Vive Targi Kielce
- 2015–2016: HSV Hamburg
- 2016–2018: TuS Nettelstedt-Lübbecke
- 2018–2019: LiT Tribe Germania
National team
Years	Team	Apps	(Gls)
2003–2016	Poland	110	(47)
Medal record
World Championship
Bronze medal – third place	2015 Qatar

Piotr Grabarczyk (born 31 October 1982) is a former Polish handball player who played for the Polish national team.

== Career ==
On 1 February 2015, Poland, including Grabarczyk, won the bronze medal of the 2015 World Championship. He also participated at the 2016 European Men's Handball Championship.

== State awards ==
- 2015 Silver Cross of Merit
