= Sergey Shelmenko =

Ukrainian and Russian handball player

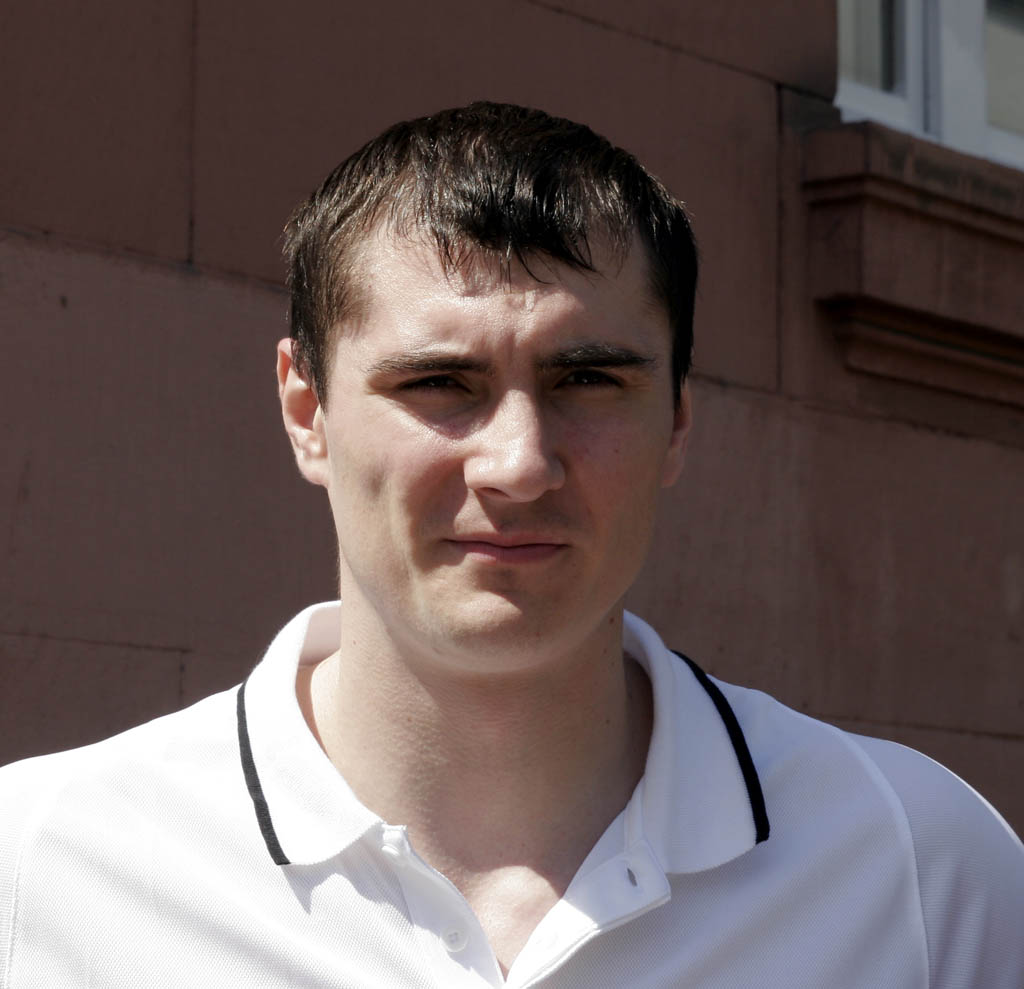

Personal information
- Nationality: Russian
- Born: 5 April 1983 (age 43) Skvyra, Ukraine
- Height: 1.96 m (6 ft 5 in)

Sport
- Sport: Handball
- Position: Right back

Senior clubs
- Years: Team
- 2000–2006: HC ZTR Zaporizhzhia
- 2006–2009: Rhein-Neckar Löwen
- 2009–2013: Chekhovskiye Medvedi
- 2013–2014: HC Dinamo Minsk
- 2014–2015: Chekhovskiye Medvedi
- 2015–2019: HC Motor Zaporizhzhia
National team
Years	Team	Apps	(Gls)
–2008	Ukraine	50	(?)
2011–2018	Russia	74	(160)

Sergey Aleksandrovich Shelmenko (Russian: Сергей Александрович Шельменко; born 5 April 1983) is a former Russian handball player who played for both the Ukraine national team and Russian national team.
