= Mikhail Niazhura =

Belarusian handball player

Personal information
- Nationality: Belarusian
- Born: 9 December 1980 (age 45) Minsk, Belarus
- Height: 2.00 m (6 ft 7 in)

Sport
- Sport: Handball
- Position: Pivot
- Current club: HC Gomel
- Number: 19
National team
Years	Team	Apps	(Gls)
–	Belarus	63	(8)

Mikhail Niazhura (born 9 December 1980) is a Belarusian handball player for HC Gomel and the Belarusian national team.
