= Michael Biegler =

German handball coach

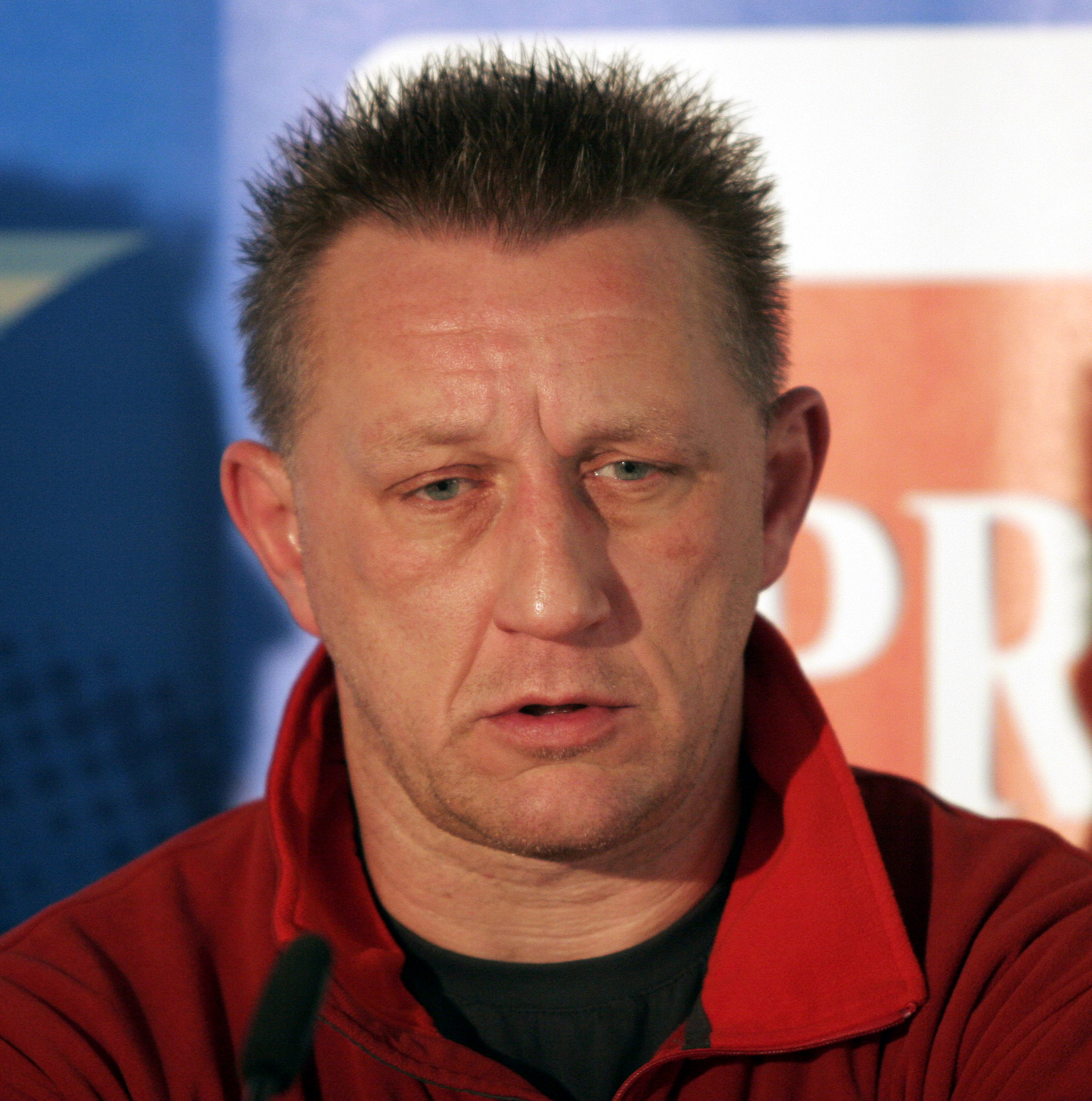

Personal information
- Born: 5 April 1961 (age 65) Leichlingen, Germany
- Height: 185 cm (73 in)

Sport
- Sport: Handball
- Current club: TSV Bayer 04 Leverkusen

Senior clubs
- Years: Team
- 1981–1982: BV Bergisch Neukirchen
- 1982–1983: TuS Königsdorf
- 1984–1985: Ohligser TV
- 1985–1986: TSV Solingen-Aufderhöhe

Teams managed
- 2003–2008: Wilhelmshavener HV
- 2008–2009: SC Magdeburg
- 2010: TV Großwallstadt
- 2012–2016: Poland
- 2016–2018: Germany (women)
- 2018–2019: SC DHfK Leipzig
- 2020: Bayer 04 Leverkusen
- 2021–2022: Ukraine (men)
- 2022: TSG Friesenheim
- 2023–2024: Bayer 04 Leverkusen

Michael Biegler (born 5 April 1961) is a German handball coach. From 2012 to 2016 he was the head coach of the Polish national team, where his biggest accomplishment was winning bronze at the 2015 World Men's Handball Championship. He also lead them at the 2016 European Men's Handball Championship and the 2017 World Men's Handball Championship.

== Sporting achievements ==
=== State awards ===
- 2015 Gold Cross of Merit
- bronze medal of world championship 2015 (Poland)
