= Zoran Kastratović =

Montenegrin handball player (born 1966)

Personal information
- Full name: Zoran Kastratović
- Nationality: Montenegro
- Born: 2 March 1966 (age 60) Ivangrad, SFR Yugoslavia

Sport
- Sport: Handball

Senior clubs
- Years: Team
- –: Ivangrad

Teams managed
- –: RK Berane
- 2011–2014: Montenegro
- 2011: RK Sutjeska Nikšić
- 2013: RK Vardar
- 2014–2015: El Jaish
- 2018: Iran
- 2019–2020: RK Metalurg Skopje
- 2021–2022: RK Tineks Prolet
- 2022–2023: Mudhar
- 2023: Saudi Arabia
- 2023–: Mudhar

Zoran Kastratović (born 2 March 1966) is a Montenegrin handball coach and former player.

== Career ==
In May 2011, it was announced that Kastratović agreed to terms to become the new head coach for Montenegro. He would lead the team at two major tournaments, before being dismissed in February 2014. During his time at the helm of Montenegro, Kastratović also served as head coach of Sutjeska Nikšić (August–November 2011) and Vardar (July–October 2013).

== Personal life ==
Kastratović is married to fellow handball player Indira Kastratović (née Jakupović).
