= Borko Ristovski =

Macedonian handball player

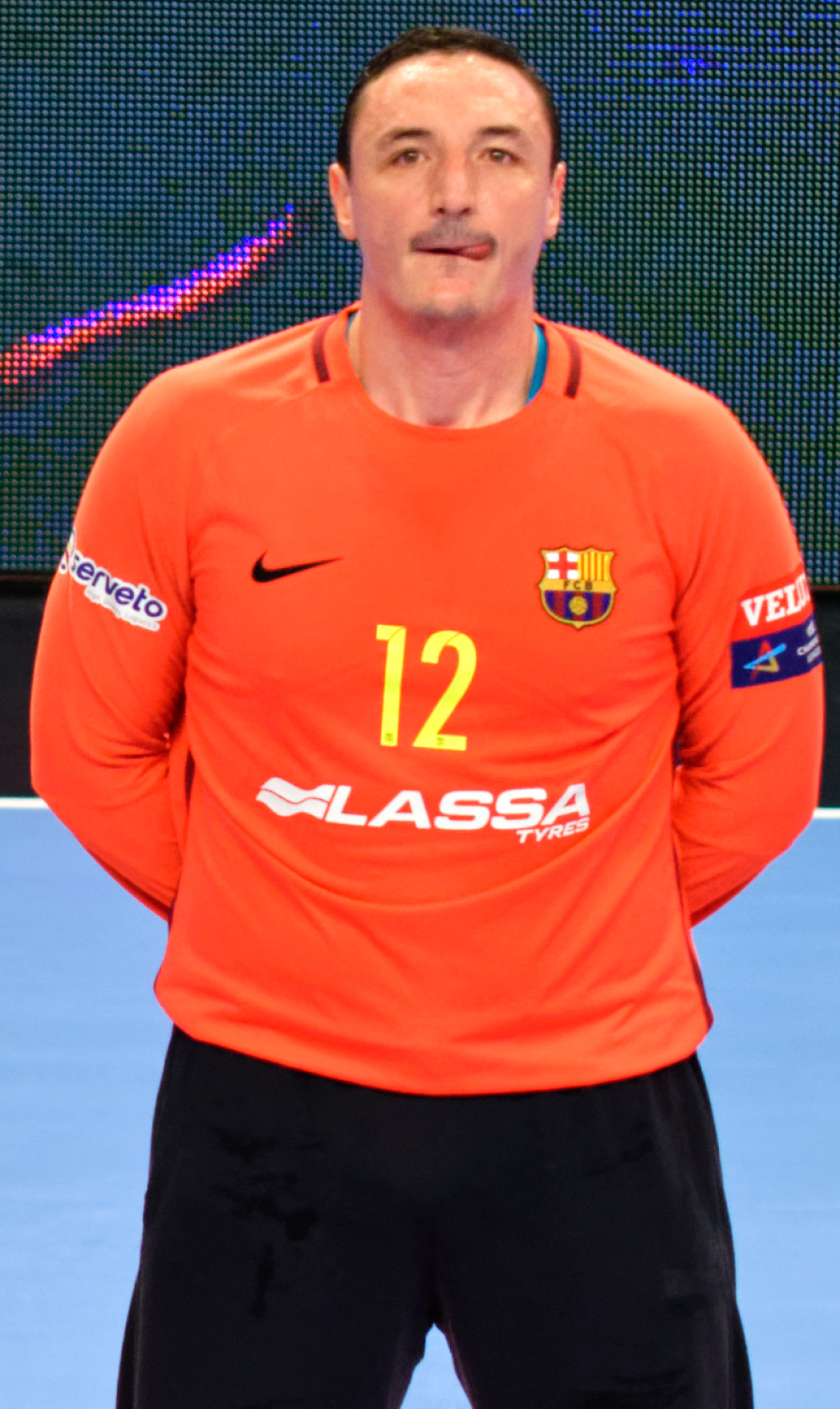
- Ristovski with FC Barcelona Handbol in 2016

Personal information
- Nationality: Macedonian
- Born: 2 November 1982 (age 43) Skopje, Yugoslavia
- Height: 1.90 m (6 ft 3 in)

Sport
- Sport: Handball
- Position: Goalkeeper

Youth career
- Years: Team
- 1995–1997: HC Rabotnichki
- 1997–1999: RK Jug

Senior clubs
- Years: Team
- 1999–2000: RK Makedonija
- 2000–2001: → RK Jug
- 2001–2003: RK Vardar
- 2003–2006: RK Metalurg Skopje
- 2006–2007: SD Teucro
- 2007: Algeciras BM
- 2007–2010: RK Metalurg Skopje
- 2010–2012: RK Vardar
- 2012–2014: VfL Gummersbach
- 2014: Al Ahly
- 2014–2015: US Créteil Handball
- 2015–2016: Rhein-Neckar Löwen
- 2016–2018: FC Barcelona
- 2018–2020: S.L. Benfica
- 2020–2023: RK Vardar 1961
National team
Years	Team	Apps	(Gls)
–	Macedonia	155	(5)

Borko Ristovski (Macedonian: Борко Ристовски; born 2 November 1982) is a retired Macedonian handball player and current Minister of Sport of North Macedonia.

== Career ==
Ristovski started his handball career in 1995 as a member of club Rabotnički. Two years later, he signed for RK Jug, where he stayed for two years, until 1999. He spent the season 1999–2000 at Makedonija (now known as RK Metalurg Skopje). In 2001 he won the Macedonian handball championship with Vardar Vatrostalna and the Macedonian Cup.

His first experience in a European Championship was in Greece in 2000 in the juniors championship. Between 2001 and 2003, Ristovski played for Vardar Vatrostalna, and in 2002 he won the second championship of his career. In 2002 he participated in the juniors European Championship in Poland. That year he was proclaimed the best young sportsman in Macedonia. In 2003, after two years with Vardar, he signed a two-year contract with that year's champion, RK Metalurg Skopje.

After his contract expired, Ristovski moved to Spain and signed a one-year contract with second division side SD Teucro in 2006. A year later, he joined Spanish team Algeciras BM and became the first Macedonian handballer to play in the ASOBAL league. However, due to family reasons, he returned to Macedonia in 2007 and signed a one-year contract with RK Metalurg Skopje, where he became one of the best players. In the 2007–08 season, he won the Macedonian championship, the third in his career. After that, he signed for a further two seasons with RK Metalurg Skopje, 2008–09 he won the Macedonian cup.

Later on, in 2010, Ristovski signed a two-season deal with RK Vardar. Afterwards, Ristovski signed a 2 1/2-year contract with German club VfL Gummersbach in February 2012. After a short spell with Egyptian team Al Ahly in 2014, he played one season for French side US Créteil Handball (2014–15) before moving to German club Rhein-Neckar Löwen, where he remained one season. He then returned to Spain and played two seasons for FC Barcelona Lassa. Shortly after, he signed with S.L. Benfica in Portugal for the 2018–19 season.

In a match against Bulgaria in the pre-qualification rounds for the 2009 World Men's Handball Championship, Ristovski scored his first goal for the senior Macedonia national team, the third in his career. From that moment, he became a vital part of the team and made a significant progress as a goalkeeper.

One of his most notable moments as a goalkeeper was a penalty save in the last second of a match against Portugal, leading Macedonia into the playoffs of the 2009 World Championship in Croatia.

In a playoff match against Iceland, Ristovski scored another goal. One of the best performances in his career was when he made 25 saves against Serbia. He was part of the Macedonia national team in the 2012 European Men's Handball Championship and made up to 29th saves per game.

== Honours ==
RK Vardar

- Macedonian League: 2001–02, 2002–03, 2020–21, 2021–22
- Macedonian Cup: 2003, 2012, 2021, 2022, 2023

RK Metalurg

- Macedonian League: 2005–06, 2007–08, 2009–10
- Macedonian Cup: 2006, 2009, 2010

Al-Ahly

- Egyptian Handball League :2014
- Egypt Handball Cup :2014

Rhein-Neckar Löwen

- German League: 2016
- DHB-Supercup:
  - Gold: 2016

FC Barcelona Handbol

- ASOBAL League: 2016–17, 2017–18
- ASOBAL Super Cup: 2016, 2017
- Copa del Rey: 2016–17, 2017–18
- ASOBAL Cup: 2016–17, 2017–18
- IHF Super Globe: 2
  - 2017, 2018

S.L. Benfica

- Portuguese Super Cup: 2018
