= Adam Wiśniewski =

Polish handball player (born 1980)

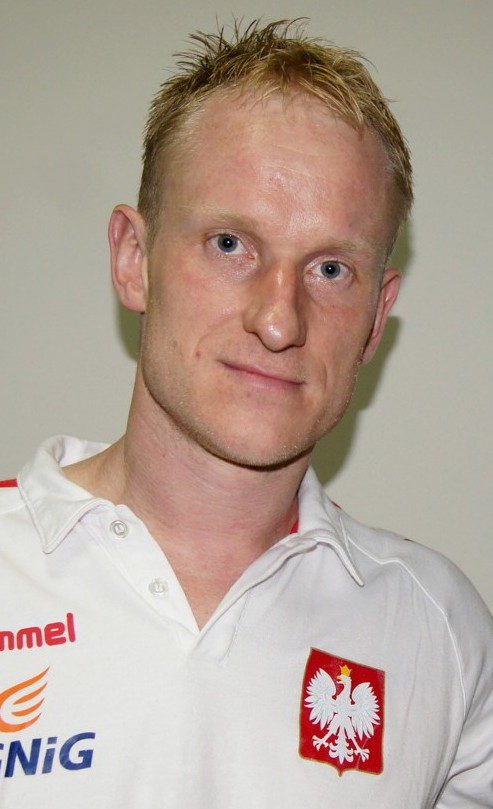

Personal information
- Nationality: Polish
- Born: 24 October 1980 (age 45) Płock, Poland
- Height: 1.93 m (6 ft 4 in)

Sport
- Sport: Handball
- Position: Left wing

Senior clubs
- Years: Team
- 1999–2017: Wisła Płock
National team
| Years | Team | Apps | (Gls) |
| 2003–2016 | Poland | 157 | (299) |
Medal record
World Championship
| Bronze medal – third place | 2015 Qatar | Team competition |

Adam Wiśniewski (born 24 October 1980) is a Polish retired handballer who played for Wisła Płock.

He competed in handball at the 2016 Summer Olympics.

== Sporting achievements ==
=== State awards ===
- 2015 Silver Cross of Merit
