= Vitali Charapenka =

Belarusian handball player

Personal information
- Nationality: Belarusian
- Born: 27 January 1984 (age 42) Brest, Belarus
- Height: 1.93 m (6 ft 4 in)

Sport
- Sport: Handball
- Position: Goalkeeper
- Current club: HC Meshkov Brest
- Number: 21
National team
Years	Team	Apps	(Gls)
–	Belarus	60	(0)

Vitali Charapenka (born 27 January 1984) is a Belarusian handball player for HC Meshkov Brest and the Belarusian national team.
