= Dzmitry Kamyshyk =

Belarusian handball player

Personal information
- Nationality: Belarusian
- Born: 1 May 1990 (age 36) Minsk, Belarus
- Height: 2.00 m (6 ft 7 in)

Sport
- Sport: Handball
- Position: Left Back/Line player
National team
Years	Team	Apps	(Gls)
–	Belarus	61	(145)

Dzmitry Kamyshyk (born 5 May 1990) is a Belarusian handball player for SKA Minsk and the Belarusian national team.
