= Igor Lyovshin =

Russian handball player

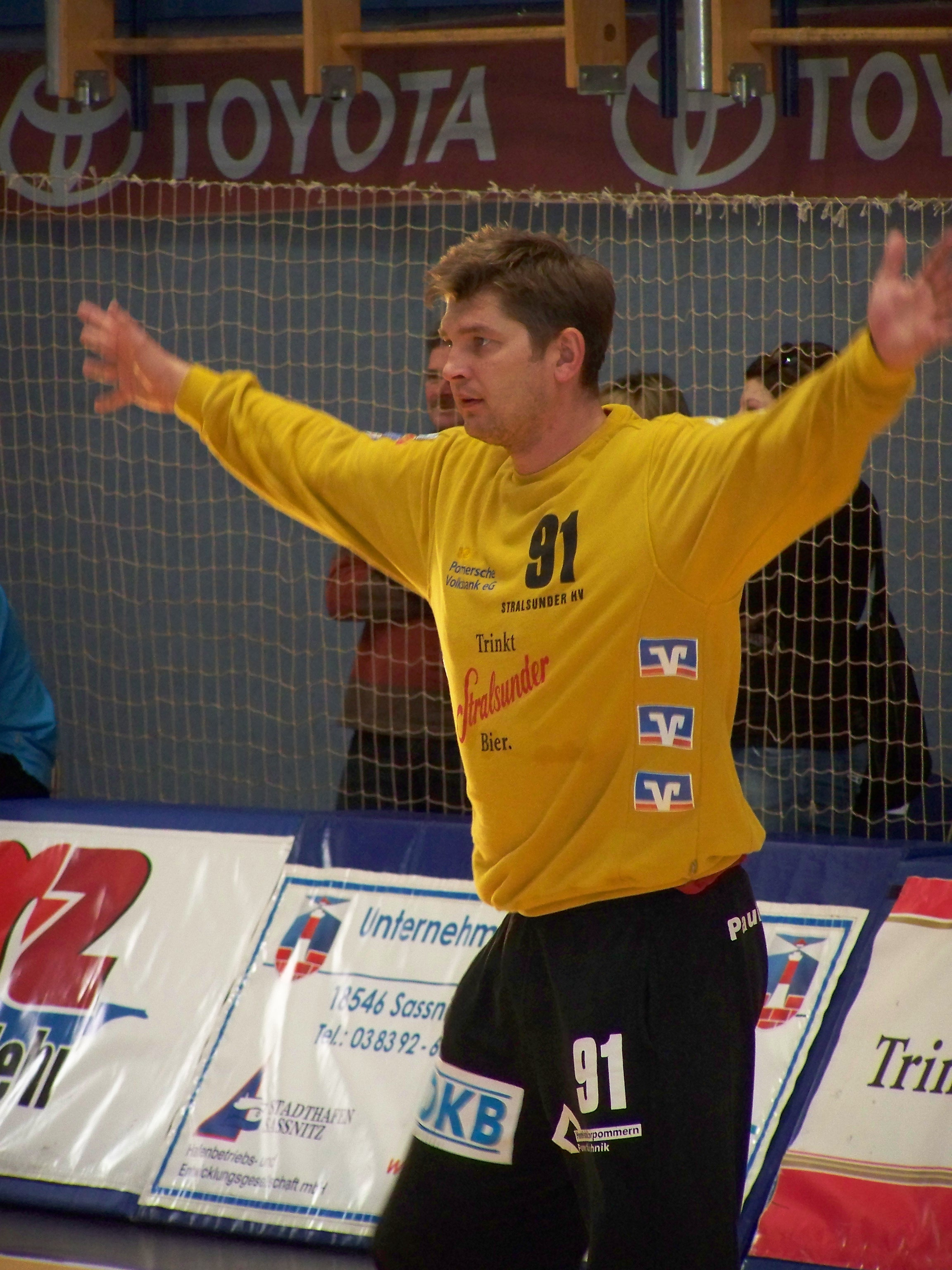

Personal information
- Nationality: Russian
- Born: 18 August 1974 (age 52) Tiraspol, Moldova
- Height: 1.98 m (6 ft 6 in)

Sport
- Sport: Handball
- Position: Goalkeeper
- Current club: CSKA Moscow (goalkeeping coach)
National team
Years	Team	Apps	(Gls)
–	Russia	48	(0)

Igor Lyovshin (born 18 August 1974) is a former Russian handball player for the Russian national team. Currently he is a goalkeeping coach at CSKA Moscow.
