= 2024–25 EHF European League group stage =

The 2024–25 EHF European League group stage was played between 8 October and 26 November 2024 to determine the sixteen teams advancing to the main round of the 2024–25 EHF European League.

== Draw ==
The draw took place on the at 11:00 CET in Vienna on 19 July 2024. The only restriction was that no clubs from the same country cannot be in the same group.

Pot 1	Pot 2	Pot 3	Pot 4
(Germany) SG Flensburg-Handewitt (Portugal) FC Porto (France) Montpellier Handball (Croatia) RK Nexe (Denmark) GOG Håndbold (Switzerland) Kadetten Schaffhausen (Spain) CD Bidasoa Irun (Sweden) IK Sävehof	(Poland) Górnik Zabrze (Romania) CSM Constanța (Slovenia) RK Gorenje Velenje (North Macedonia) Vardar 1961 (Hungary) MOL-Tatabánya KC (Iceland) FH Hafnarfjarðar (Slovakia) HT Tatran Prešov (Germany) THW Kiel	(Portugal) SL Benfica (Croatia) MRK Sesvete (France) Fenix Toulouse Handball (Spain) Bathco BM Torrelavega (Poland) KGHM Chrobry Głogów (N/A) Play Off Winner 1 (Note: The eventual team in this slot was Abanca Ademar León.) (N/A) Play Off Winner 2 (Note: The eventual team in this slot was MT Melsungen.) (N/A) Play Off Winner 3 (Note: The eventual team in this slot was Limoges Handball.)	(N/A) Play Off Winner 4 (Note: The eventual team in this slot was HC Kriens-Luzern.) (N/A) Play Off Winner 5 (Note: The eventual team in this slot was VfL Gummersbach.) (N/A) Play Off Winner 6 (Note: The eventual team in this slot was Valur.) (N/A) Play Off Winner 7 (Note: The eventual team in this slot was Fraikin BM Granollers.) (N/A) Play Off Winner 8 (Note: The eventual team in this slot was Bjerringbro-Silkeborg.) (N/A) Play Off Winner 9 (Note: The eventual team in this slot was Ystads IF.) (Serbia) RK Vojvodina (N/A) Special play off winner (Note: The eventual team in this slot was HCB Karviná.)

== Format ==
In each group, teams played against each other in a double round-robin format, with home and away matches.

== Tiebreakers ==
In the group stage, teams were ranked according to points (2 points for a win, 1 point for a draw, 0 points for a loss), and if tied on points, the following tiebreaking criteria were applied, in the order given, to determine the rankings:

1. Points in matches among tied teams;
2. Goal difference in matches among tied teams;
3. Goal difference in all group matches;
4. Goals scored in all group matches;
5. If more than two teams were tied, and after applying all head-to-head criteria above, a subset of teams were still tied, all head-to-head criteria above were reapplied exclusively to this subset of teams;
6. Drawing lots.

== Groups ==
All times are local

=== Group A ===
Pos	Team	Pld	W	D	L	GF	GA	GD	Pts	Qualification	LUZ	GOG	GOR	ADE
1	(Switzerland) HC Kriens-Luzern	6	5	0	1	196	181	+15	10	Main Round	—	32–30	30–25	34–30
2	(Denmark) GOG Håndbold	6	4	1	1	198	168	+30	9	Main Round	39–36	—	31–21	36–23
3	(Slovenia) RK Gorenje Velenje	6	1	1	4	160	186	−26	3		27–33	35–35	—	28–25
4	(Spain) Abanca Ademar León	6	1	0	5	161	180	−19	2		30–31	21–27	32–24	—

Source: EHF

8 October 2024; 18:45	HC Kriens-Luzern (Switzerland)	34–30	(Spain) Abanca Ademar León	Sursee Stadthalle, Sursee; Attendance: 1,000; Referees: Bozhinovski, Nachevski (MKD)
8 October 2024; 18:45	Šipić 9	(17–16)	Sanz de Nicolás 7	Sursee Stadthalle, Sursee; Attendance: 1,000; Referees: Bozhinovski, Nachevski (MKD)
8 October 2024; 18:45	1× (red card)	Report	1× (yellow card) 3× (suspension)	Sursee Stadthalle, Sursee; Attendance: 1,000; Referees: Bozhinovski, Nachevski (MKD)

8 October 2024; 18:45	RK Gorenje Velenje (Slovenia)	35–35	(Denmark) GOG Håndbold	Rdeca Dvorana, Velenje; Attendance: 600; Referees: Jerlecki, Labun (POL)
8 October 2024; 18:45	Poklar 11	(17–17)	Blonz, Kildelund 6	Rdeca Dvorana, Velenje; Attendance: 600; Referees: Jerlecki, Labun (POL)
8 October 2024; 18:45	1× (yellow card) 6× (suspension)	Report	1× (suspension)	Rdeca Dvorana, Velenje; Attendance: 600; Referees: Jerlecki, Labun (POL)

15 October 2024; 18:45	GOG Håndbold (Denmark)	39–36	(Switzerland) HC Kriens-Luzern	Phønix Tag Arena, Gudme; Attendance: 1,683; Referees: Šniurevičius, Grigalionis (LTU)
15 October 2024; 18:45	Lykke 7	(19–14)	Steenaerts 8	Phønix Tag Arena, Gudme; Attendance: 1,683; Referees: Šniurevičius, Grigalionis (LTU)
15 October 2024; 18:45	1× (yellow card) 5× (suspension)	Report	2× (suspension)	Phønix Tag Arena, Gudme; Attendance: 1,683; Referees: Šniurevičius, Grigalionis (LTU)

15 October 2024; 20:45	Abanca Ademar León (Spain)	32–24	(Slovenia) RK Gorenje Velenje	Palacio de los Deportes de León; Attendance: 2,238; Referees: Carmaux, Mursch (FRA)
15 October 2024; 20:45	Álvarez 7	(14–10)	Sokolič 5	Palacio de los Deportes de León; Attendance: 2,238; Referees: Carmaux, Mursch (FRA)
15 October 2024; 20:45	1× (yellow card) 2× (suspension)	Report	1× (yellow card) 4× (suspension)	Palacio de los Deportes de León; Attendance: 2,238; Referees: Carmaux, Mursch (FRA)

22 October 2024; 18:45	RK Gorenje Velenje (Slovenia)	27–33	(Switzerland) HC Kriens-Luzern	Rdeča Dvorana, Velenje; Attendance: 997; Referees: Jović, Arnautović (BIH)
22 October 2024; 18:45	Poklar, Sokolič 5	(14–19)	Sigrist 10	Rdeča Dvorana, Velenje; Attendance: 997; Referees: Jović, Arnautović (BIH)
22 October 2024; 18:45	3× (suspension)	Report	1× (yellow card) 3× (suspension)	Rdeča Dvorana, Velenje; Attendance: 997; Referees: Jović, Arnautović (BIH)

22 October 2024; 18:45	GOG Håndbold (Denmark)	36–23	(Spain) Abanca Ademar León	Phønix Tag Arena, Gudme; Attendance: 2,040; Referees: Doychinov, Goretsov (BUL)
22 October 2024; 18:45	Tilsted 7	(20–11)	Pérez, Fernández 5	Phønix Tag Arena, Gudme; Attendance: 2,040; Referees: Doychinov, Goretsov (BUL)
22 October 2024; 18:45	1× (suspension) 1× (red card)	Report	1× (suspension) 1× (red card)	Phønix Tag Arena, Gudme; Attendance: 2,040; Referees: Doychinov, Goretsov (BUL)

29 October 2024; 18:45	HC Kriens-Luzern (Switzerland)	30–25	(Slovenia) RK Gorenje Velenje	Sursee Stadthalle, Sursee; Attendance: 1,500; Referees: Nicolae, Mihai (ROU)
29 October 2024; 18:45	Steenaerts 6	(15-12)	Jovičić 5	Sursee Stadthalle, Sursee; Attendance: 1,500; Referees: Nicolae, Mihai (ROU)
29 October 2024; 18:45	4× (suspension)	Report	1× (yellow card) 5× (suspension)	Sursee Stadthalle, Sursee; Attendance: 1,500; Referees: Nicolae, Mihai (ROU)

29 October 2024; 20:45	Abanca Ademar León (Spain)	21–27	(Denmark) GOG Håndbold	Palacio de los Deportes de León; Attendance: 1,359; Referees: Ramesh, Suresh (DEU)
29 October 2024; 20:45	Wasiak, Arce 4	(12-16)	Grøndahl, Lykke 6	Palacio de los Deportes de León; Attendance: 1,359; Referees: Ramesh, Suresh (DEU)
29 October 2024; 20:45		Report	1× (yellow card) 5× (suspension)	Palacio de los Deportes de León; Attendance: 1,359; Referees: Ramesh, Suresh (DEU)

19 November 2024; 18:45	GOG Håndbold (Denmark)	31–21	(Slovenia) RK Gorenje Velenje	Phønix Tag Arena, Gudme; Attendance: 1,728; Referees: Cipov, Klus (SVK)
19 November 2024; 18:45	Vilhelmsen 7	(16–11)	Sokolič 7	Phønix Tag Arena, Gudme; Attendance: 1,728; Referees: Cipov, Klus (SVK)
19 November 2024; 18:45	3× (yellow card) 1× (suspension)	Report	5× (yellow card)	Phønix Tag Arena, Gudme; Attendance: 1,728; Referees: Cipov, Klus (SVK)

19 November 2024; 20:45	Abanca Ademar León (Spain)	30–31	(Switzerland) HC Kriens-Luzern	Palacio de los Deportes de León; Attendance: 2,475; Referees: Jørum, Kleven (NOR)
19 November 2024; 20:45	Lindqvist 7	(14–13)	Orbović 8	Palacio de los Deportes de León; Attendance: 2,475; Referees: Jørum, Kleven (NOR)
19 November 2024; 20:45	2× (yellow card) 2× (suspension)	Report	2× (suspension) 1× (red card)	Palacio de los Deportes de León; Attendance: 2,475; Referees: Jørum, Kleven (NOR)

26 November 2024; 18:45	HC Kriens-Luzern (Switzerland)	32–30	(Denmark) GOG Håndbold	Sursee Stadthalle, Sursee; Attendance: 1,950; Referees: Vešović, Mitrović (MNE)
26 November 2024; 18:45	Sigrist 14	(13–12)	Blonz 7	Sursee Stadthalle, Sursee; Attendance: 1,950; Referees: Vešović, Mitrović (MNE)
26 November 2024; 18:45	2× (suspension)	Report	2× (yellow card) 6× (suspension) 1× (red card)	Sursee Stadthalle, Sursee; Attendance: 1,950; Referees: Vešović, Mitrović (MNE)

26 November 2024; 20:45	RK Gorenje Velenje (Slovenia)	28–25	(Spain) Abanca Ademar León	Rdeča Dvorana, Velenje; Attendance: 350; Referees: Andorka, Hucker (HUN)
26 November 2024; 20:45	Jezernik 6	(14–10)	Miñambres 6	Rdeča Dvorana, Velenje; Attendance: 350; Referees: Andorka, Hucker (HUN)
26 November 2024; 20:45	2× (yellow card) 1× (suspension)	Report	1× (yellow card) 2× (suspension) 1× (red card)	Rdeča Dvorana, Velenje; Attendance: 350; Referees: Andorka, Hucker (HUN)

=== Group B ===
Pos	Team	Pld	W	D	L	GF	GA	GD	Pts	Qualification	MON	GRA	SIL	ZAB
1	(France) Montpellier Handball	6	6	0	0	193	145	+48	12	Main Round	—	34–25	40–26	30–25
2	(Spain) Fraikin BM Granollers	6	3	0	3	194	186	+8	6	Main Round	24–28	—	36–27	41–30
3	(Denmark) Bjerringbro-Silkeborg	6	2	1	3	165	193	−28	5		22–34	35–32	—	30–26
4	(Poland) Górnik Zabrze	6	0	1	5	161	189	−28	1		23–27	32–36	25–25	—

Source: EHF

8 October 2024; 20:45	Montpellier Handball (France)	40–26	(Denmark) Bjerringbro-Silkeborg	FDI Stadium, Montpellier; Attendance: 2,800; Referees: Martins, Martins (POR)
8 October 2024; 20:45	Karlsson, A. Lenne 5	(23–13)	Olsen 6	FDI Stadium, Montpellier; Attendance: 2,800; Referees: Martins, Martins (POR)
8 October 2024; 20:45	2× (suspension)	Report	2× (suspension)	FDI Stadium, Montpellier; Attendance: 2,800; Referees: Martins, Martins (POR)

8 October 2024; 20:45	Górnik Zabrze (Poland)	32–36	(Spain) Fraikin BM Granollers	"Centrum" Dabrowa Gornicza, Dąbrowa Górnicza; Attendance: 420; Referees: Jovic, Arnautovic (BIH)
8 October 2024; 20:45	Mořkovský, Minotskyi 6	(15–21)	García Robledo 7	"Centrum" Dabrowa Gornicza, Dąbrowa Górnicza; Attendance: 420; Referees: Jovic, Arnautovic (BIH)
8 October 2024; 20:45	1× (yellow card) 2× (suspension)	Report	3× (suspension)	"Centrum" Dabrowa Gornicza, Dąbrowa Górnicza; Attendance: 420; Referees: Jovic, Arnautovic (BIH)

15 October 2024; 18:45	Fraikin BM Granollers (Spain)	24–28	(France) Montpellier Handball	Palau d'Esports, Granollers; Attendance: 1,282; Referees: Igor, Alexei (MDA)
15 October 2024; 18:45	Robledo 6	(11–14)	Simonet, Hesham 6	Palau d'Esports, Granollers; Attendance: 1,282; Referees: Igor, Alexei (MDA)
15 October 2024; 18:45	2× (suspension)	Report	2× (suspension)	Palau d'Esports, Granollers; Attendance: 1,282; Referees: Igor, Alexei (MDA)

15 October 2024; 20:45	Bjerringbro-Silkeborg (Denmark)	30–26	(Poland) Górnik Zabrze	Jysk Arena, Silkeborg; Attendance: 1,821; Referees: Aleksandrs, Ralfs (LVA)
15 October 2024; 20:45	Boldsen 7	(15–13)	Artemenko 6	Jysk Arena, Silkeborg; Attendance: 1,821; Referees: Aleksandrs, Ralfs (LVA)
15 October 2024; 20:45	2× (suspension)	Report	1× (suspension) 1× (red card)	Jysk Arena, Silkeborg; Attendance: 1,821; Referees: Aleksandrs, Ralfs (LVA)

22 October 2024; 18:45	Fraikin BM Granollers (Spain)	36–27	(Denmark) Bjerringbro-Silkeborg	Palau d'Esports, Granollers; Attendance: 1,900; Referees: Tomislav, Robert (CRO)
22 October 2024; 18:45	Martínez 8	(16-19)	Lauge, Lynggaard 5	Palau d'Esports, Granollers; Attendance: 1,900; Referees: Tomislav, Robert (CRO)
22 October 2024; 18:45	1× (suspension)	Report	2× (suspension)	Palau d'Esports, Granollers; Attendance: 1,900; Referees: Tomislav, Robert (CRO)

22 October 2024; 20:45	Górnik Zabrze (Poland)	23–27	(France) Montpellier Handball	"Centrum" Dabrowa Gornicza, Dąbrowa Górnicza; Attendance: 450; Referees: Boris, Zoran (SVK)
22 October 2024; 20:45	Szyszko 4	(8-12)	Karlsson 5	"Centrum" Dabrowa Gornicza, Dąbrowa Górnicza; Attendance: 450; Referees: Boris, Zoran (SVK)
22 October 2024; 20:45	1× (yellow card) 3× (suspension)	Report	2× (suspension)	"Centrum" Dabrowa Gornicza, Dąbrowa Górnicza; Attendance: 450; Referees: Boris, Zoran (SVK)

29 October 2024; 18:45	Bjerringbro-Silkeborg (Denmark)	35–32	(Spain) Fraikin BM Granollers	Jysk Arena, Silkeborg; Attendance: 1,778; Referees: Péter, Balázs (HUN)
29 October 2024; 18:45	Balling 8	(20-15)	Robledo 7	Jysk Arena, Silkeborg; Attendance: 1,778; Referees: Péter, Balázs (HUN)
29 October 2024; 18:45	1× (yellow card) 4× (suspension)	Report	1× (yellow card) 5× (suspension)	Jysk Arena, Silkeborg; Attendance: 1,778; Referees: Péter, Balázs (HUN)

29 October 2024; 20:45	Montpellier Handball (France)	30–25	(Poland) Górnik Zabrze	FDI Stadium, Montpellier; Attendance: 3,000; Referees: Ante, Petar (CRO)
29 October 2024; 20:45	Karlsson 8	(15-9)	Szyszko 5	FDI Stadium, Montpellier; Attendance: 3,000; Referees: Ante, Petar (CRO)
29 October 2024; 20:45	1× (yellow card) 1× (suspension)	Report	2× (suspension)	FDI Stadium, Montpellier; Attendance: 3,000; Referees: Ante, Petar (CRO)

19 November 2024; 18:45	Fraikin BM Granollers (Spain)	41–30	(Poland) Górnik Zabrze	Palau d'Esports, Granollers; Attendance: 1,011; Referees: Pétursson, Þrastarson (ISL)
19 November 2024; 18:45	Romero 10	(20–13)	Ilchenko 8	Palau d'Esports, Granollers; Attendance: 1,011; Referees: Pétursson, Þrastarson (ISL)
19 November 2024; 18:45	1× (yellow card) 4× (suspension)	Report	1× (yellow card) 5× (suspension)	Palau d'Esports, Granollers; Attendance: 1,011; Referees: Pétursson, Þrastarson (ISL)

19 November 2024; 20:45	Bjerringbro-Silkeborg (Denmark)	22–34	(France) Montpellier Handball	Jysk Arena, Silkeborg; Attendance: 1,798; Referees: Stark, Ştefan (ROM)
19 November 2024; 20:45	Lauge 7	(12–15)	Monte Dos Santos 6	Jysk Arena, Silkeborg; Attendance: 1,798; Referees: Stark, Ştefan (ROM)
19 November 2024; 20:45	1× (yellow card) 3× (suspension)	Report	2× (suspension)	Jysk Arena, Silkeborg; Attendance: 1,798; Referees: Stark, Ştefan (ROM)

26 November 2024; 20:45	Montpellier Handball (France)	34–25	(Spain) Fraikin BM Granollers	FDI Stadium, Montpellier; Attendance: 2,800; Referees: Bozhinovski, Nachevski (MKD)
26 November 2024; 20:45	Y. Lenne 5	(15–17)	Martínez, Torroella 4	FDI Stadium, Montpellier; Attendance: 2,800; Referees: Bozhinovski, Nachevski (MKD)
26 November 2024; 20:45		Report		FDI Stadium, Montpellier; Attendance: 2,800; Referees: Bozhinovski, Nachevski (MKD)

26 November 2024; 20:45	Górnik Zabrze (Poland)	25–25	(Denmark) Bjerringbro-Silkeborg	"Centrum" Dabrowa Gornicza, Dąbrowa Górnicza; Attendance: 520; Referees: Sekulić, Jovandić (SRB)
26 November 2024; 20:45	Ilchenko 7	(11–12)	Sand 7	"Centrum" Dabrowa Gornicza, Dąbrowa Górnicza; Attendance: 520; Referees: Sekulić, Jovandić (SRB)
26 November 2024; 20:45	1× (suspension)	Report	2× (suspension)	"Centrum" Dabrowa Gornicza, Dąbrowa Górnicza; Attendance: 520; Referees: Sekulić, Jovandić (SRB)

=== Group C ===
Pos	Team	Pld	W	D	L	GF	GA	GD	Pts	Qualification	BEN	LIM	KAD	TAT
1	(Portugal) SL Benfica	6	5	0	1	190	163	+27	10	Main Round	—	37–31	39–32	36–23
2	(France) Limoges Handball	6	4	0	2	198	170	+28	8	Main Round	36–28	—	27–31	31–24
3	(Switzerland) Kadetten Schaffhausen	6	3	0	3	195	187	+8	6		25–26	29–39	—	39–26
4	(Slovakia) HT Tatran Prešov	6	0	0	6	140	203	−63	0		16–24	21–34	30–39	—

Source: EHF

8 October 2024; 18:45	Kadetten Schaffhausen (Switzerland)	25–26	(Portugal) SL Benfica	BBC-Arena, Schaffhausen; Attendance: 1,223; Referees: Biro, Kiss (HUN)
8 October 2024; 18:45	Ríkharðsson 6	(12–15)	Moreira 8	BBC-Arena, Schaffhausen; Attendance: 1,223; Referees: Biro, Kiss (HUN)
8 October 2024; 18:45	5× (suspension)	Report	4× (suspension) 1× (red card)	BBC-Arena, Schaffhausen; Attendance: 1,223; Referees: Biro, Kiss (HUN)

8 October 2024; 20:45	Limoges Handball (France)	31–24	(Slovakia) HT Tatran Prešov	Palais des Sports de Beaublanc, Limoges; Attendance: 2,800; Referees: Loncar, Loncar (CRO)
8 October 2024; 20:45	Azkue 7	(15–12)	Caballero 9	Palais des Sports de Beaublanc, Limoges; Attendance: 2,800; Referees: Loncar, Loncar (CRO)
8 October 2024; 20:45	4× (suspension)	Report	1× (yellow card) 4× (suspension)	Palais des Sports de Beaublanc, Limoges; Attendance: 2,800; Referees: Loncar, Loncar (CRO)

15 October 2024; 18:45	HT Tatran Prešov (Slovakia)	30–39	(Switzerland) Kadetten Schaffhausen	Tatran Handball Arena; Attendance: 2,450; Referees: Ivanović, Vujisić (MNE)
15 October 2024; 18:45	Karlov, Silva da Fernandes 9	(15–23)	Bartók 9	Tatran Handball Arena; Attendance: 2,450; Referees: Ivanović, Vujisić (MNE)
15 October 2024; 18:45	1× (yellow card) 6× (suspension)	Report	1× (yellow card) 4× (suspension)	Tatran Handball Arena; Attendance: 2,450; Referees: Ivanović, Vujisić (MNE)

15 October 2024; 20:45	SL Benfica (Portugal)	37–31	(France) Limoges Handball	Pavilhão da Luz Nº 2 Attendance: 348; Referees: Álvarez, Bustamante (ESP)
15 October 2024; 20:45	Grigoraș 7	(20–16)	Hrstić 7	Pavilhão da Luz Nº 2 Attendance: 348; Referees: Álvarez, Bustamante (ESP)
15 October 2024; 20:45	5× (suspension)	Report	1× (yellow card) 4× (suspension)	Pavilhão da Luz Nº 2 Attendance: 348; Referees: Álvarez, Bustamante (ESP)

22 October 2024; 20:45	Limoges Handball (France)	27–31	(Switzerland) Kadetten Schaffhausen	Palais des Sports de Beaublanc, Limoges; Attendance: 3,745; Referees: Backović, Palačković (SLO)
22 October 2024; 20:45	Turchenko 7	(16–13)	Ríkharðsson 8	Palais des Sports de Beaublanc, Limoges; Attendance: 3,745; Referees: Backović, Palačković (SLO)
22 October 2024; 20:45	3× (suspension)	Report	4× (suspension)	Palais des Sports de Beaublanc, Limoges; Attendance: 3,745; Referees: Backović, Palačković (SLO)

22 October 2024; 20:45	HT Tatran Prešov (Slovakia)	16–24	(Portugal) SL Benfica	Tatran Handball Arena; Attendance: 1,244; Referees: Bozhinovski, Nachevski (MKD)
22 October 2024; 20:45	Karlov 5	(6–9)	Grigoraș 6	Tatran Handball Arena; Attendance: 1,244; Referees: Bozhinovski, Nachevski (MKD)
22 October 2024; 20:45	3× (suspension)	Report	1× (suspension)	Tatran Handball Arena; Attendance: 1,244; Referees: Bozhinovski, Nachevski (MKD)

29 October 2024; 18:45	Kadetten Schaffhausen (Switzerland)	29–39	(France) Limoges Handball	BBC-Arena, Schaffhausen; Attendance: 1,157; Referees: Elíasson, Pálsson (ISL)
29 October 2024; 18:45	Ríkharðsson, Martinović 5	(14–18)	Turchenko 12	BBC-Arena, Schaffhausen; Attendance: 1,157; Referees: Elíasson, Pálsson (ISL)
29 October 2024; 18:45	1× (yellow card) 4× (suspension)	Report	1× (yellow card) 2× (suspension)	BBC-Arena, Schaffhausen; Attendance: 1,157; Referees: Elíasson, Pálsson (ISL)

29 October 2024; 18:45	SL Benfica (Portugal)	36–23	(Slovakia) HT Tatran Prešov	Pavilhão da Luz Nº 2 Attendance: 336; Referees: Antić, Jakovljević (SRB)
29 October 2024; 18:45	Izquierdo 6	(22–12)	Silva da Fernandes 8	Pavilhão da Luz Nº 2 Attendance: 336; Referees: Antić, Jakovljević (SRB)
29 October 2024; 18:45	3× (suspension)	Report	1× (yellow card) 4× (suspension)	Pavilhão da Luz Nº 2 Attendance: 336; Referees: Antić, Jakovljević (SRB)

19 November 2024; 18:45	HT Tatran Prešov (Slovakia)	21–34	(France) Limoges Handball	Tatran Handball Arena; Attendance: 850; Referees: Pîrvu, Potîrniche (ROU)
19 November 2024; 18:45	Sako 5	(10–17)	three players 6	Tatran Handball Arena; Attendance: 850; Referees: Pîrvu, Potîrniche (ROU)
19 November 2024; 18:45	1× (suspension) 1× (red card)	Report	2× (suspension) 1× (red card)	Tatran Handball Arena; Attendance: 850; Referees: Pîrvu, Potîrniche (ROU)

19 November 2024; 20:45	SL Benfica (Portugal)	39–32	(Switzerland) Kadetten Schaffhausen	Pavilhão da Luz Nº 2 Attendance: 400; Referees: Jerlecki, Labun (POL)
19 November 2024; 20:45	Hanusz 6	(20–14)	Maros 9	Pavilhão da Luz Nº 2 Attendance: 400; Referees: Jerlecki, Labun (POL)
19 November 2024; 20:45	4× (suspension)	Report	1× (yellow card) 3× (suspension)	Pavilhão da Luz Nº 2 Attendance: 400; Referees: Jerlecki, Labun (POL)

26 November 2024; 18:45	Kadetten Schaffhausen (Switzerland)	39–26	(Slovakia) HT Tatran Prešov	BBC-Arena, Schaffhausen; Attendance: 653; Referees: Pagh, Thygesen (DEN)
26 November 2024; 18:45	Ríkharðsson 10	(21–10)	Karlov 5	BBC-Arena, Schaffhausen; Attendance: 653; Referees: Pagh, Thygesen (DEN)
26 November 2024; 18:45	2× (suspension) 1× (red card)	Report	3× (suspension)	BBC-Arena, Schaffhausen; Attendance: 653; Referees: Pagh, Thygesen (DEN)

26 November 2024; 18:45	Limoges Handball (France)	36–28	(Portugal) SL Benfica	Palais des Sports de Beaublanc, Limoges; Attendance: 3.810; Referees: Thiyagarajah, Thiyagarajah (GER)
26 November 2024; 18:45	Kušan 9	(17–11)	Sánchez-Migallón, Hanusz 5	Palais des Sports de Beaublanc, Limoges; Attendance: 3.810; Referees: Thiyagarajah, Thiyagarajah (GER)
26 November 2024; 18:45	3× (suspension)	Report	1× (yellow card) 1× (suspension)	Palais des Sports de Beaublanc, Limoges; Attendance: 3.810; Referees: Thiyagarajah, Thiyagarajah (GER)

=== Group D ===
Pos	Team	Pld	W	D	L	GF	GA	GD	Pts	Qualification	BID	YST	GLO	CON
1	(Spain) CD Bidasoa Irun	6	4	1	1	199	176	+23	9	Main Round	—	35–32	33–33	37–25
2	(Sweden) Ystads IF	6	3	1	2	196	179	+17	7	Main Round	23–29	—	36–30	38–29
3	(Poland) KGHM Chrobry Głogów	6	2	1	3	187	201	−14	5		28–35	27–38	—	37–33
4	(Romania) CSM Constanța	6	1	1	4	177	203	−26	3		35–30	29–29	26–32	—

Source: EHF

8 October 2024; 19:45	CSM Constanța (Romania)	29–29	(Sweden) Ystads IF	Simona Amanar Sports Hall, Constanța; Attendance: 1,550; Referees: Fotakidis, Kinatzidis (GRE)
8 October 2024; 19:45	Aliokhin 8	(13–16)	Joelsson, Olsen 6	Simona Amanar Sports Hall, Constanța; Attendance: 1,550; Referees: Fotakidis, Kinatzidis (GRE)
8 October 2024; 19:45	1× (suspension)	Report	3× (suspension)	Simona Amanar Sports Hall, Constanța; Attendance: 1,550; Referees: Fotakidis, Kinatzidis (GRE)

8 October 2024; 20:45	CD Bidasoa Irun (Spain)	33–33	(Poland) KGHM Chrobry Głogów	Pabellón Polideportivo Artaleku, Irun; Attendance: 1,100; Referees: Antic, Jakovljevic (SRB)
8 October 2024; 20:45	Cavero 8	(15–17)	Zieniewicz 8	Pabellón Polideportivo Artaleku, Irun; Attendance: 1,100; Referees: Antic, Jakovljevic (SRB)
8 October 2024; 20:45	1× (yellow card) 3× (suspension)	Report	5× (suspension) 1× (red card)	Pabellón Polideportivo Artaleku, Irun; Attendance: 1,100; Referees: Antic, Jakovljevic (SRB)

15 October 2024; 18:45	Ystads IF (Sweden)	23–29	(Spain) CD Bidasoa Irun	Ystad Arena, Ystad; Attendance: 720; Referees: Thiyagarajah, Thiyagarajah (GER)
15 October 2024; 18:45	Joelsson 6	(14–13)	Nieto Marcos 6	Ystad Arena, Ystad; Attendance: 720; Referees: Thiyagarajah, Thiyagarajah (GER)
15 October 2024; 18:45	3× (suspension)	Report	1× (yellow card) 2× (suspension)	Ystad Arena, Ystad; Attendance: 720; Referees: Thiyagarajah, Thiyagarajah (GER)

15 October 2024; 18:45	KGHM Chrobry Głogów (Poland)	37–33	(Romania) CSM Constanța	Sportowi Hala Ryszarda Matuszaka, Głogów; Attendance: 990; Referees: Cindrić, Gonzurek (CRO)
15 October 2024; 18:45	Paterek 11	(18–17)	Aliokhin 7	Sportowi Hala Ryszarda Matuszaka, Głogów; Attendance: 990; Referees: Cindrić, Gonzurek (CRO)
15 October 2024; 18:45	2× (suspension)	Report	3× (suspension)	Sportowi Hala Ryszarda Matuszaka, Głogów; Attendance: 990; Referees: Cindrić, Gonzurek (CRO)

22 October 2024; 18:45	CSM Constanța (Romania)	35–30	(Spain) CD Bidasoa Irun	Simona Amanar Sports Hall, Constanța; Attendance: 1,650; Referees: Vešović, Mitrović (MNE)
22 October 2024; 18:45	Aliokhin, Buzle 7	(17–15)	three players 5	Simona Amanar Sports Hall, Constanța; Attendance: 1,650; Referees: Vešović, Mitrović (MNE)
22 October 2024; 18:45	1× (yellow card) 7× (suspension)	Report	6× (suspension) 1× (red card)	Simona Amanar Sports Hall, Constanța; Attendance: 1,650; Referees: Vešović, Mitrović (MNE)

22 October 2024; 18:45	Ystads IF (Sweden)	36–30	(Poland) KGHM Chrobry Głogów	Ystad Arena, Ystad; Attendance: 481; Referees: Pétursson, Þrastarson (ISL)
22 October 2024; 18:45	Joelsson 10	(18–15)	Paterek 7	Ystad Arena, Ystad; Attendance: 481; Referees: Pétursson, Þrastarson (ISL)
22 October 2024; 18:45	3× (suspension)	Report	7× (suspension)	Ystad Arena, Ystad; Attendance: 481; Referees: Pétursson, Þrastarson (ISL)

29 October 2024; 18:45	KGHM Chrobry Głogów (Poland)	27–38	(Sweden) Ystads IF	Sportowi Hala Ryszarda Matuszaka, Głogów; Attendance: 1,000; Referees: Ivanović, Vujisi (MNE)
29 October 2024; 18:45	Zieniewicz 6	(12–18)	Joelsson, Lindskog 7	Sportowi Hala Ryszarda Matuszaka, Głogów; Attendance: 1,000; Referees: Ivanović, Vujisi (MNE)
29 October 2024; 18:45	1× (suspension)	Report	1× (yellow card) 2× (suspension)	Sportowi Hala Ryszarda Matuszaka, Głogów; Attendance: 1,000; Referees: Ivanović, Vujisi (MNE)

29 October 2024; 20:45	CD Bidasoa Irun (Spain)	37–25	(Romania) CSM Constanța	Pabellón Polideportivo Artaleku, Irun; Attendance: 1,384; Referees: Erdogan, Özdeniz (TUR)
29 October 2024; 20:45	García 10	(20–13)	Aliokhin 7	Pabellón Polideportivo Artaleku, Irun; Attendance: 1,384; Referees: Erdogan, Özdeniz (TUR)
29 October 2024; 20:45	4× (suspension)	Report	1× (yellow card) 6× (suspension)	Pabellón Polideportivo Artaleku, Irun; Attendance: 1,384; Referees: Erdogan, Özdeniz (TUR)

19 November 2024; 18:45	Ystads IF (Sweden)	38–29	(Romania) CSM Constanța	Ystad Arena, Ystad; Attendance: 491; Referees: Kull, Tint (EST)
19 November 2024; 18:45	Fernebrand, Olsen 7	(20–18)	Buzle 9	Ystad Arena, Ystad; Attendance: 491; Referees: Kull, Tint (EST)
19 November 2024; 18:45	5× (suspension)	Report	1× (yellow card) 1× (suspension)	Ystad Arena, Ystad; Attendance: 491; Referees: Kull, Tint (EST)

19 November 2024; 20:45	KGHM Chrobry Głogów (Poland)	28–35	(Spain) CD Bidasoa Irun	Sportowi Hala Ryszarda Matuszaka, Głogów; Attendance: 950; Referees: Panayides, Andreou (CYP)
19 November 2024; 20:45	Grabowski 7	(10–17)	Esteban Salinas Múgica 5	Sportowi Hala Ryszarda Matuszaka, Głogów; Attendance: 950; Referees: Panayides, Andreou (CYP)
19 November 2024; 20:45	1× (yellow card) 4× (suspension)	Report	2× (yellow card) 6× (suspension)	Sportowi Hala Ryszarda Matuszaka, Głogów; Attendance: 950; Referees: Panayides, Andreou (CYP)

26 November 2024; 18:45	CSM Constanța (Romania)	26–32	(Poland) KGHM Chrobry Głogów	Simona Amanar Sports Hall, Constanța; Attendance: 1,060; Referees: Cernavskis, Bogdanovs (LAT)
26 November 2024; 18:45	Buzle 6	(12–18)	Paterek 7	Simona Amanar Sports Hall, Constanța; Attendance: 1,060; Referees: Cernavskis, Bogdanovs (LAT)
26 November 2024; 18:45	4× (suspension)	Report	5× (suspension)	Simona Amanar Sports Hall, Constanța; Attendance: 1,060; Referees: Cernavskis, Bogdanovs (LAT)

26 November 2024; 20:45	CD Bidasoa Irun (Spain)	35–32	(Sweden) Ystads IF	Pabellón Polideportivo Artaleku, Irun; Attendance: 1,653; Referees: Metalari, Nikolovski (MKD)
26 November 2024; 20:45	Nieto Marcos 8	(17–16)	Ekberg 7	Pabellón Polideportivo Artaleku, Irun; Attendance: 1,653; Referees: Metalari, Nikolovski (MKD)
26 November 2024; 20:45	1× (yellow card) 3× (suspension)	Report	1× (yellow card) 2× (suspension)	Pabellón Polideportivo Artaleku, Irun; Attendance: 1,653; Referees: Metalari, Nikolovski (MKD)

=== Group E ===
Pos	Team	Pld	W	D	L	GF	GA	GD	Pts	Qualification	KIE	VOJ	TOR	NEX
1	(Germany) THW Kiel	6	6	0	0	200	174	+26	12	Main Round	—	37–35	32–27	31–28
2	(Serbia) RK Vojvodina	6	4	0	2	194	186	+8	8	Main Round	28–32	—	31–30	31–26
3	(Spain) Bathco BM Torrelavega	6	0	2	4	172	188	−16	2		30–33	26–33	—	32–32
4	(Croatia) RK Nexe	6	0	2	4	174	192	−18	2		26–35	35–36	27–27	—

Source: EHF

8 October 2024; 20:45	THW Kiel (Germany)	32–27	(Spain) Bathco BM Torrelavega	Wunderino Arena, Kiel; Attendance: 3,619; Referees: Vešović, Mitrović (MNE)
8 October 2024; 20:45	Madsen 10	(18–14)	Fernández 5	Wunderino Arena, Kiel; Attendance: 3,619; Referees: Vešović, Mitrović (MNE)
8 October 2024; 20:45	2× (suspension)	Report	1× (yellow card) 4× (suspension)	Wunderino Arena, Kiel; Attendance: 3,619; Referees: Vešović, Mitrović (MNE)

8 October 2024; 20:45	RK Nexe (Croatia)	35–36	(Serbia) RK Vojvodina	OS Kralja Tomislava, Našice; Attendance: 1,950; Referees: Leszczynski, Piechota (POL)
8 October 2024; 20:45	Moslavac 7	(19–19)	Vorkapić 7	OS Kralja Tomislava, Našice; Attendance: 1,950; Referees: Leszczynski, Piechota (POL)
8 October 2024; 20:45	4× (suspension)	Report	7× (suspension) 1× (red card)	OS Kralja Tomislava, Našice; Attendance: 1,950; Referees: Leszczynski, Piechota (POL)

15 October 2024; 18:45	RK Vojvodina (Serbia)	28–32	(Germany) THW Kiel	SPENS, Novi Sad; Attendance: 5,500; Referees: Andorka, Hucker (HUN)
15 October 2024; 18:45	Jovanović 7	(15–18)	Imre 8	SPENS, Novi Sad; Attendance: 5,500; Referees: Andorka, Hucker (HUN)
15 October 2024; 18:45	1× (yellow card) 1× (suspension)	Report	2× (suspension)	SPENS, Novi Sad; Attendance: 5,500; Referees: Andorka, Hucker (HUN)

15 October 2024; 20:45	Bathco BM Torrelavega (Spain)	32–32	(Croatia) RK Nexe	Pabellon Vicente Trueba, Torrelavega; Attendance: 2,203; Referees: Barysas, Petrusis (LTU)
15 October 2024; 20:45	Prokop 7	(14–11)	Moslavac, Lučin 8	Pabellon Vicente Trueba, Torrelavega; Attendance: 2,203; Referees: Barysas, Petrusis (LTU)
15 October 2024; 20:45	1× (yellow card) 3× (suspension)	Report	1× (yellow card) 4× (suspension)	Pabellon Vicente Trueba, Torrelavega; Attendance: 2,203; Referees: Barysas, Petrusis (LTU)

22 October 2024; 20:45	RK Nexe (Croatia)	26–35	(Germany) THW Kiel	OS Kralja Tomislava, Našice; Attendance: 2,000; Referees: Brkić, Jusufhodžić (AUT)
22 October 2024; 20:45	Lučin 7	(14–17)	Bilyk 7	OS Kralja Tomislava, Našice; Attendance: 2,000; Referees: Brkić, Jusufhodžić (AUT)
22 October 2024; 20:45	3× (suspension)	Report	1× (yellow card) 4× (suspension)	OS Kralja Tomislava, Našice; Attendance: 2,000; Referees: Brkić, Jusufhodžić (AUT)

22 October 2024; 20:45	RK Vojvodina (Serbia)	31–30	(Spain) Bathco BM Torrelavega	Sportska hala Slana Bara, Novi Sad; Attendance: 1,500; Referees: Budzák, Záhradník (SVK)
22 October 2024; 20:45	Nafea, Jovanović 7	(14–10)	Prokop, Fernández 7	Sportska hala Slana Bara, Novi Sad; Attendance: 1,500; Referees: Budzák, Záhradník (SVK)
22 October 2024; 20:45	1× (yellow card) 1× (suspension)	Report	5× (suspension) 1× (red card)	Sportska hala Slana Bara, Novi Sad; Attendance: 1,500; Referees: Budzák, Záhradník (SVK)

29 October 2024; 20:45	THW Kiel (Germany)	31–28	(Croatia) RK Nexe	Wunderino Arena, Kiel; Attendance: 5,049; Referees: Marion, Alvar (EST)
29 October 2024; 20:45	Wallinius, Imre 6	(15-12)	Moslavac 6	Wunderino Arena, Kiel; Attendance: 5,049; Referees: Marion, Alvar (EST)
29 October 2024; 20:45	2× (suspension)	Report	2× (yellow card) 2× (suspension)	Wunderino Arena, Kiel; Attendance: 5,049; Referees: Marion, Alvar (EST)

29 October 2024; 20:45	Bathco BM Torrelavega (Spain)	26–33	(Serbia) RK Vojvodina	Pabellon Vicente Trueba, Torrelavega; Attendance: 2,000; Referees: Denis, Christoph (AUT)
29 October 2024; 20:45	Pérez 6	(8-16)	Vorkapić 11	Pabellon Vicente Trueba, Torrelavega; Attendance: 2,000; Referees: Denis, Christoph (AUT)
29 October 2024; 20:45	1× (yellow card) 4× (suspension)	Report	1× (yellow card) 9× (suspension)	Pabellon Vicente Trueba, Torrelavega; Attendance: 2,000; Referees: Denis, Christoph (AUT)

19 November 2024; 20:45	Bathco BM Torrelavega (Spain)	30–33	(Germany) THW Kiel	Pabellon Vicente Trueba, Torrelavega; Attendance: 2,000; Referees: Picard, Vauchez (FRA)
19 November 2024; 20:45	Fernández 7	(15–19)	Johansson 6	Pabellon Vicente Trueba, Torrelavega; Attendance: 2,000; Referees: Picard, Vauchez (FRA)
19 November 2024; 20:45	6× (suspension)	Report	1× (yellow card) 4× (suspension)	Pabellon Vicente Trueba, Torrelavega; Attendance: 2,000; Referees: Picard, Vauchez (FRA)

19 November 2024; 20:45	RK Vojvodina (Serbia)	31–26	(Croatia) RK Nexe	Sportska hala Slana Bara, Novi Sad; Attendance: 1,500; Referees: Charitsos, Naskos (GRE)
19 November 2024; 20:45	Vorkapić 9	(18–11)	Lučin, Kozina 6	Sportska hala Slana Bara, Novi Sad; Attendance: 1,500; Referees: Charitsos, Naskos (GRE)
19 November 2024; 20:45	6× (suspension)	Report	4× (suspension) 1× (red card)	Sportska hala Slana Bara, Novi Sad; Attendance: 1,500; Referees: Charitsos, Naskos (GRE)

26 November 2024; 18:45	THW Kiel (Germany)	37–35	(Serbia) RK Vojvodina	Wunderino Arena, Kiel; Attendance: 7,571; Referees: Loncar, Loncar (CRO)
26 November 2024; 18:45	Bilyk 11	(21–15)	Silva 9	Wunderino Arena, Kiel; Attendance: 7,571; Referees: Loncar, Loncar (CRO)
26 November 2024; 18:45	3× (suspension) 1× (red card)	Report	5× (suspension)	Wunderino Arena, Kiel; Attendance: 7,571; Referees: Loncar, Loncar (CRO)

26 November 2024; 20:45	RK Nexe (Croatia)	27–27	(Spain) Bathco BM Torrelavega	OS Kralja Tomislava, Našice; Attendance: 700; Referees: Pukšič, Satler (SLO)
26 November 2024; 20:45	Dolenec, Moslavac 5	(13–16)	Muñoz 7	OS Kralja Tomislava, Našice; Attendance: 700; Referees: Pukšič, Satler (SLO)
26 November 2024; 20:45	1× (suspension)	Report	1× (suspension)	OS Kralja Tomislava, Našice; Attendance: 700; Referees: Pukšič, Satler (SLO)

=== Group F ===
Pos	Team	Pld	W	D	L	GF	GA	GD	Pts	Qualification	MEL	POR	VAR	VAL
1	(Germany) MT Melsungen	6	5	0	1	194	150	+44	10	Main Round	—	32–27	34–18	36–21
2	(Portugal) FC Porto	6	3	1	2	178	163	+15	7	Main Round	24–29	—	37–24	37–29
3	(North Macedonia) RK Vardar	6	2	1	3	163	187	−24	5		32–30	22–26	—	33–26
4	(Iceland) Valur	6	0	2	4	165	200	−35	2		28–33	27–27	34–34	—

Source: EHF

8 October 2024; 19:45	FC Porto (Portugal)	24–29	(Germany) MT Melsungen	Dragão Arena, Porto; Attendance: 901; Referees: Boricic, Markovic (SRB)
8 October 2024; 19:45	Diocou 8	(10–16)	Darmoul 6	Dragão Arena, Porto; Attendance: 901; Referees: Boricic, Markovic (SRB)
8 October 2024; 19:45	3× (suspension)	Report	4× (suspension)	Dragão Arena, Porto; Attendance: 901; Referees: Boricic, Markovic (SRB)

8 October 2024; 20:45	RK Vardar (North Macedonia)	33–26	(Iceland) Valur	Jane Sandanski Arena, Skopje; Attendance: 2,100; Referees: Bolic, Hurich (AUT)
8 October 2024; 20:45	Srdanović, Borozan 6	(19–11)	Magnússon 4	Jane Sandanski Arena, Skopje; Attendance: 2,100; Referees: Bolic, Hurich (AUT)
8 October 2024; 20:45	2× (suspension)	Report	5× (suspension) 1× (red card)	Jane Sandanski Arena, Skopje; Attendance: 2,100; Referees: Bolic, Hurich (AUT)

15 October 2024; 18:45	MT Melsungen (Germany)	34–18	(North Macedonia) RK Vardar	Rothenbach-Halle, Kassel; Attendance: 1,857; Referees: Mikelic, Paradina (HRV)
15 October 2024; 18:45	three players 5	(17–10)	Krsmancic 4	Rothenbach-Halle, Kassel; Attendance: 1,857; Referees: Mikelic, Paradina (HRV)
15 October 2024; 18:45	1× (suspension)	Report	1× (yellow card) 3× (suspension)	Rothenbach-Halle, Kassel; Attendance: 1,857; Referees: Mikelic, Paradina (HRV)

15 October 2024; 20:15	Valur (Iceland)	27–27	(Portugal) FC Porto	Kaplakriki, Hafnarfjörður; Attendance: 2,200; Referees: Kull, Tint (EST)
15 October 2024; 20:15	Sigurðsson 5	(9–16)	Salina 7	Kaplakriki, Hafnarfjörður; Attendance: 2,200; Referees: Kull, Tint (EST)
15 October 2024; 20:15	2× (suspension)	Report	1× (yellow card) 4× (suspension) 2× (red card)	Kaplakriki, Hafnarfjörður; Attendance: 2,200; Referees: Kull, Tint (EST)

22 October 2024; 20:45	RK Vardar (North Macedonia)	22–26	(Portugal) FC Porto	Jane Sandanski Arena, Skopje; Attendance: 3,500; Referees: Leszczynski, Piechota (POL)
22 October 2024; 20:45	Rodríguez 4	(12–10)	D. Oliveira, Diocou 7	Jane Sandanski Arena, Skopje; Attendance: 3,500; Referees: Leszczynski, Piechota (POL)
22 October 2024; 20:45	1× (yellow card) 1× (suspension)	Report	4× (suspension)	Jane Sandanski Arena, Skopje; Attendance: 3,500; Referees: Leszczynski, Piechota (POL)

22 October 2024; 20:45	MT Melsungen (Germany)	36–21	(Iceland) Valur	Rothenbach-Halle, Kassel; Attendance: 2,109; Referees: Vujacic, Kazanegra (MNE)
22 October 2024; 20:45	Enderleit 6	(17–10)	Gústafsson 4	Rothenbach-Halle, Kassel; Attendance: 2,109; Referees: Vujacic, Kazanegra (MNE)
22 October 2024; 20:45	1× (suspension)	Report	5× (suspension)	Rothenbach-Halle, Kassel; Attendance: 2,109; Referees: Vujacic, Kazanegra (MNE)

29 October 2024; 20:45	Valur (Iceland)	28–33	(Germany) MT Melsungen	Hlíðarendi, Reykjavík; Attendance: 853; Referees: Jerlecki, Labun (POL)
29 October 2024; 20:45	Þórðarson 8	(15–16)	Torrebejano 10	Hlíðarendi, Reykjavík; Attendance: 853; Referees: Jerlecki, Labun (POL)
29 October 2024; 20:45	1× (yellow card) 6× (suspension)	Report	5× (suspension)	Hlíðarendi, Reykjavík; Attendance: 853; Referees: Jerlecki, Labun (POL)

29 October 2024; 20:45	FC Porto (Portugal)	37–24	(North Macedonia) RK Vardar	Dragão Arena, Porto; Attendance: 820; Referees: Carmaux, Mursch (FRA)
29 October 2024; 20:45	Veitia Valdés 9	(17–10)	Srdanović 6	Dragão Arena, Porto; Attendance: 820; Referees: Carmaux, Mursch (FRA)
29 October 2024; 20:45	1× (yellow card) 3× (suspension)	Report	1× (yellow card) 3× (suspension)	Dragão Arena, Porto; Attendance: 820; Referees: Carmaux, Mursch (FRA)

19 November 2024; 20:45	MT Melsungen (Germany)	32–27	(Portugal) FC Porto	Rothenbach-Halle, Kassel; Attendance: 1,983; Referees: Budzák, Záhradník (SVK)
19 November 2024; 20:45	Enderleit 7	(15–13)	M. Oliveira 7	Rothenbach-Halle, Kassel; Attendance: 1,983; Referees: Budzák, Záhradník (SVK)
19 November 2024; 20:45	2× (suspension)	Report	2× (suspension)	Rothenbach-Halle, Kassel; Attendance: 1,983; Referees: Budzák, Záhradník (SVK)

19 November 2024; 20:45	Valur (Iceland)	34–34	(North Macedonia) RK Vardar	Hlíðarendi, Reykjavík; Attendance: 476; Referees: Šniurevičius, Grigalionis (LTU)
19 November 2024; 20:45	Þórðarson 11	(18–17)	three players 5	Hlíðarendi, Reykjavík; Attendance: 476; Referees: Šniurevičius, Grigalionis (LTU)
19 November 2024; 20:45	4× (suspension) 1× (red card)	Report	7× (suspension)	Hlíðarendi, Reykjavík; Attendance: 476; Referees: Šniurevičius, Grigalionis (LTU)

26 November 2024; 20:45	FC Porto (Portugal)	37–29	(Iceland) Valur	Dragão Arena, Porto; Attendance: 708; Referees: Mikelic, Paradina (HRV)
26 November 2024; 20:45	three players 5	(17–18)	Þórðarson 6	Dragão Arena, Porto; Attendance: 708; Referees: Mikelic, Paradina (HRV)
26 November 2024; 20:45	1× (suspension)	Report	2× (suspension)	Dragão Arena, Porto; Attendance: 708; Referees: Mikelic, Paradina (HRV)

26 November 2024; 20:45	RK Vardar (North Macedonia)	32–30	(Germany) MT Melsungen	Jane Sandanski Arena, Skopje; Attendance: 1,500; Referees: Aghakishi, Aghakishi (AZE)
26 November 2024; 20:45	Kooij 8	(17–17)	Torrebejano 10	Jane Sandanski Arena, Skopje; Attendance: 1,500; Referees: Aghakishi, Aghakishi (AZE)
26 November 2024; 20:45	1× (yellow card) 5× (suspension)	Report	2× (suspension)	Jane Sandanski Arena, Skopje; Attendance: 1,500; Referees: Aghakishi, Aghakishi (AZE)

=== Group G ===
Pos	Team	Pld	W	D	L	GF	GA	GD	Pts	Qualification	FLE	TAT	KAR	SES
1	(Germany) SG Flensburg-Handewitt	6	6	0	0	234	173	+61	12	Main Round	—	44–27	36–33	42–25
2	(Hungary) MOL-Tatabánya KC	6	3	1	2	174	193	−19	7	Main Round	29–39	—	28–27	28–25
3	(Czech Republic) HCB Karviná	6	1	1	4	177	203	−26	3		31–41	31–31	—	32–29
4	(Croatia) MRK Sesvete	6	1	0	5	172	188	−16	2		28–32	27–31	38–23	—

Source: EHF

8 October 2024; 18:45	SG Flensburg-Handewitt (Germany)	42–25	(Croatia) MRK Sesvete	Campushalle, Flensburg; Attendance: 1,734; Referees: Pétursson, Þrastarson (ISL)
8 October 2024; 18:45	Pedersen 10	(21–17)	Hršak, Gavrić 5	Campushalle, Flensburg; Attendance: 1,734; Referees: Pétursson, Þrastarson (ISL)
8 October 2024; 18:45	3× (suspension)	Report	2× (suspension)	Campushalle, Flensburg; Attendance: 1,734; Referees: Pétursson, Þrastarson (ISL)

8 October 2024; 18:45	MOL-Tatabánya KC (Hungary)	28–27	(Czech Republic) HCB Karviná	Tatabányai Multifunkcionális Sportcsarnok, Tatabánya; Attendance: 2,000; Referees: Vujacic, Kazanegra (MNE)
8 October 2024; 18:45	Enomoto 6	(16–10)	Blyzniuk 7	Tatabányai Multifunkcionális Sportcsarnok, Tatabánya; Attendance: 2,000; Referees: Vujacic, Kazanegra (MNE)
8 October 2024; 18:45	1× (yellow card) 4× (suspension)	Report	1× (yellow card) 4× (suspension)	Tatabányai Multifunkcionális Sportcsarnok, Tatabánya; Attendance: 2,000; Referees: Vujacic, Kazanegra (MNE)

15 October 2024; 18:45	MRK Sesvete (Croatia)	27–31	(Hungary) MOL-Tatabánya KC	High school Jelkovec, Zagreb; Attendance: 950; Referees: Panayides, Andreou (CYP)
15 October 2024; 18:45	Gavrić 11	(14–17)	Maraš 9	High school Jelkovec, Zagreb; Attendance: 950; Referees: Panayides, Andreou (CYP)
15 October 2024; 18:45	1× (yellow card) 4× (suspension)	Report	1× (yellow card) 6× (suspension)	High school Jelkovec, Zagreb; Attendance: 950; Referees: Panayides, Andreou (CYP)

15 October 2024; 20:45	HCB Karviná (Czech Republic)	31–41	(Germany) SG Flensburg-Handewitt	Házenkářská hala, Karviná; Attendance: 1,600; Referees: Metalari, Nikolovski (MKD)
15 October 2024; 20:45	Solak 10	(11–24)	Møller 7	Házenkářská hala, Karviná; Attendance: 1,600; Referees: Metalari, Nikolovski (MKD)
15 October 2024; 20:45	2× (suspension)	Report	1× (yellow card) 3× (suspension)	Házenkářská hala, Karviná; Attendance: 1,600; Referees: Metalari, Nikolovski (MKD)

22 October 2024; 18:45	HCB Karviná (Czech Republic)	32–29	(Croatia) MRK Sesvete	Házenkářská hala, Karviná; Attendance: 1,025; Referees: Aghakishi, Aghakishi (AZE)
22 October 2024; 18:45	Solak 10	(17–16)	Raužan, Gavrić 7	Házenkářská hala, Karviná; Attendance: 1,025; Referees: Aghakishi, Aghakishi (AZE)
22 October 2024; 18:45	3× (suspension)	Report	2× (yellow card) 2× (suspension)	Házenkářská hala, Karviná; Attendance: 1,025; Referees: Aghakishi, Aghakishi (AZE)

22 October 2024; 18:45	SG Flensburg-Handewitt (Germany)	44–27	(Hungary) MOL-Tatabánya KC	Campushalle, Flensburg; Attendance: 3,064; Referees: Borge, Nygren (NOR)
22 October 2024; 18:45	Pedersen 14	(22–13)	Ntanzi 6	Campushalle, Flensburg; Attendance: 3,064; Referees: Borge, Nygren (NOR)
22 October 2024; 18:45	1× (yellow card) 2× (suspension)	Report	4× (suspension)	Campushalle, Flensburg; Attendance: 3,064; Referees: Borge, Nygren (NOR)

29 October 2024; 18:45	MOL-Tatabánya KC (Hungary)	29–39	(Germany) SG Flensburg-Handewitt	Tatabányai Multifunkcionális Sportcsarnok, Tatabánya; Attendance: 3,220; Referees: Charitsos, Naskos (GRE)
29 October 2024; 18:45	Plaza Jiménez 7	(15–21)	Pedersen 12	Tatabányai Multifunkcionális Sportcsarnok, Tatabánya; Attendance: 3,220; Referees: Charitsos, Naskos (GRE)
29 October 2024; 18:45	4× (suspension)	Report	1× (yellow card) 1× (suspension)	Tatabányai Multifunkcionális Sportcsarnok, Tatabánya; Attendance: 3,220; Referees: Charitsos, Naskos (GRE)

29 October 2024; 18:45	MRK Sesvete (Croatia)	38–23	(Czech Republic) HCB Karviná	High school Jelkovec, Zagreb; Attendance: 1,150; Referees: Šniurevičius, Grigalionis (LTU)
29 October 2024; 18:45	Tomic 7	(17–13)	Solak 5	High school Jelkovec, Zagreb; Attendance: 1,150; Referees: Šniurevičius, Grigalionis (LTU)
29 October 2024; 18:45	2× (yellow card) 3× (suspension)	Report	1× (yellow card) 1× (suspension)	High school Jelkovec, Zagreb; Attendance: 1,150; Referees: Šniurevičius, Grigalionis (LTU)

19 November 2024; 18:45	MRK Sesvete (Croatia)	28–32	(Germany) SG Flensburg-Handewitt	High school Jelkovec, Zagreb; Attendance: 950; Referees: Ivanović, Vujisi (MNE)
19 November 2024; 18:45	Raužan 7	(14–15)	Møller 7	High school Jelkovec, Zagreb; Attendance: 950; Referees: Ivanović, Vujisi (MNE)
19 November 2024; 18:45	2× (yellow card) 5× (suspension)	Report	2× (yellow card) 3× (suspension)	High school Jelkovec, Zagreb; Attendance: 950; Referees: Ivanović, Vujisi (MNE)

19 November 2024; 20:45	HCB Karviná (Czech Republic)	31–31	(Hungary) MOL-Tatabánya KC	Házenkářská hala, Karviná; Attendance: 1,100; Referees: Jović, Arnautović (BIH)
19 November 2024; 20:45	Blyzniuk, Solak 6	(17–18)	Ntanzi 7	Házenkářská hala, Karviná; Attendance: 1,100; Referees: Jović, Arnautović (BIH)
19 November 2024; 20:45	2× (yellow card) 1× (suspension)	Report	2× (yellow card) 3× (suspension)	Házenkářská hala, Karviná; Attendance: 1,100; Referees: Jović, Arnautović (BIH)

26 November 2024; 18:45	MOL-Tatabánya KC (Hungary)	28–25	(Croatia) MRK Sesvete	Tatabányai Multifunkcionális Sportcsarnok, Tatabánya; Attendance: 1,673; Referees: Mandak, Rudinsky (SVK)
26 November 2024; 18:45	Damatrin, Rodríguez Álvarez 4	(16–10)	Hršak 6	Tatabányai Multifunkcionális Sportcsarnok, Tatabánya; Attendance: 1,673; Referees: Mandak, Rudinsky (SVK)
26 November 2024; 18:45	1× (yellow card) 6× (suspension)	Report	2× (yellow card) 5× (suspension) 1× (red card)	Tatabányai Multifunkcionális Sportcsarnok, Tatabánya; Attendance: 1,673; Referees: Mandak, Rudinsky (SVK)

26 November 2024; 20:45	SG Flensburg-Handewitt (Germany)	36–33	(Czech Republic) HCB Karviná	Campushalle, Flensburg; Attendance: 2,334; Referees: Simone, Monitillo (ITA)
26 November 2024; 20:45	Golla 8	(20–15)	Blyzniuk 9	Campushalle, Flensburg; Attendance: 2,334; Referees: Simone, Monitillo (ITA)
26 November 2024; 20:45	1× (yellow card) 4× (suspension)	Report	4× (suspension)	Campushalle, Flensburg; Attendance: 2,334; Referees: Simone, Monitillo (ITA)

=== Group H ===
Pos	Team	Pld	W	D	L	GF	GA	GD	Pts	Qualification	GUM	FEN	SAV	FH
1	(Germany) VfL Gummersbach	6	5	0	1	200	162	+38	10	Main Round	—	33–26	37–35	32–24
2	(France) Fenix Toulouse Handball	6	4	0	2	190	182	+8	8	Main Round	31–30	—	30–33	37–30
3	(Sweden) IK Sävehof	6	2	0	4	184	192	−8	4		25–28	31–37	—	30–26
4	(Iceland) FH Hafnarfjarðar	6	1	0	5	160	198	−38	2		21–40	25–29	34–30	—

Source: EHF

8 October 2024; 18:45	VfL Gummersbach (Germany)	37–35	(Sweden) IK Sävehof	Schwalbe-Arena, Gummersbach; Attendance: 2,046; Referees: Mandak, Rudinsky (SVK)
8 October 2024; 18:45	Elliði, Mahé 7	(18–16)	Berlin, Brolin 6	Schwalbe-Arena, Gummersbach; Attendance: 2,046; Referees: Mandak, Rudinsky (SVK)
8 October 2024; 18:45	3× (suspension)	Report	1× (suspension)	Schwalbe-Arena, Gummersbach; Attendance: 2,046; Referees: Mandak, Rudinsky (SVK)

8 October 2024; 18:45	Fenix Toulouse Handball (France)	37–30	(Iceland) FH Hafnarfjarðar	Palais des sports André-Brouat, Toulouse; Attendance: 1,363; Referees: Erdogan, Özdeniz (TUR)
8 October 2024; 18:45	Vieira 8	(18–16)	Andrason 7	Palais des sports André-Brouat, Toulouse; Attendance: 1,363; Referees: Erdogan, Özdeniz (TUR)
8 October 2024; 18:45	3× (suspension)	Report	1× (suspension)	Palais des sports André-Brouat, Toulouse; Attendance: 1,363; Referees: Erdogan, Özdeniz (TUR)

15 October 2024; 18:45	IK Sävehof (Sweden)	31–37	(France) Fenix Toulouse Handball	Partille Arena, Partille; Attendance: 1,122; Referees: Stark, Ştefan (ROM)
15 October 2024; 18:45	Brolin 6	(11–18)	Kempf 9	Partille Arena, Partille; Attendance: 1,122; Referees: Stark, Ştefan (ROM)
15 October 2024; 18:45	2× (suspension)	Report	8× (suspension)	Partille Arena, Partille; Attendance: 1,122; Referees: Stark, Ştefan (ROM)

15 October 2024; 22:30	FH Hafnarfjarðar (Iceland)	21–40	(Germany) VfL Gummersbach	Kaplakriki, Hafnarfjörður; Attendance: 2,200; Referees: Horváth, Marton (HUN)
15 October 2024; 22:30	Birgisson 5	(12–19)	Schluroff 10	Kaplakriki, Hafnarfjörður; Attendance: 2,200; Referees: Horváth, Marton (HUN)
15 October 2024; 22:30	2× (yellow card) 7× (suspension)	Report	1× (yellow card) 6× (suspension)	Kaplakriki, Hafnarfjörður; Attendance: 2,200; Referees: Horváth, Marton (HUN)

22 October 2024; 18:45	VfL Gummersbach (Germany)	33–26	(France) Fenix Toulouse Handball	Schwalbe-Arena, Gummersbach; Attendance: 2,688; Referees: Mitrevski, Todorovski (MKD)
22 October 2024; 18:45	Horžen 10	(16–15)	Käll, Ilić je 4	Schwalbe-Arena, Gummersbach; Attendance: 2,688; Referees: Mitrevski, Todorovski (MKD)
22 October 2024; 18:45	1× (yellow card) 4× (suspension)	Report	1× (yellow card) 3× (suspension)	Schwalbe-Arena, Gummersbach; Attendance: 2,688; Referees: Mitrevski, Todorovski (MKD)

22 October 2024; 20:45	FH Hafnarfjarðar (Iceland)	34–30	(Sweden) IK Sävehof	Kaplakriki, Hafnarfjörður; Attendance: 800; Referees: Lončar, Lončar (CRO)
22 October 2024; 20:45	Friðriksson 9	(15–18)	Mittún 9	Kaplakriki, Hafnarfjörður; Attendance: 800; Referees: Lončar, Lončar (CRO)
22 October 2024; 20:45	3× (suspension)	Report	4× (suspension)	Kaplakriki, Hafnarfjörður; Attendance: 800; Referees: Lončar, Lončar (CRO)

29 October 2024; 18:45	IK Sävehof (Sweden)	30–26	(Iceland) FH Hafnarfjarðar	Partille Arena, Partille; Attendance: 748; Referees: Caçador, Nicolau (POR)
29 October 2024; 18:45	three players 5	(16–13)	Gudjónsson 6	Partille Arena, Partille; Attendance: 748; Referees: Caçador, Nicolau (POR)
29 October 2024; 18:45	1× (yellow card) 1× (suspension)	Report	2× (yellow card) 5× (suspension)	Partille Arena, Partille; Attendance: 748; Referees: Caçador, Nicolau (POR)

29 October 2024; 18:45	Fenix Toulouse Handball (France)	31–30	(Germany) VfL Gummersbach	Palais des sports André-Brouat, Toulouse; Attendance: 3,274; Referees: Sekulić, Jovandić (SRB)
29 October 2024; 18:45	Ilić 6	(14–15)	Schluroff 7	Palais des sports André-Brouat, Toulouse; Attendance: 3,274; Referees: Sekulić, Jovandić (SRB)
29 October 2024; 18:45	3× (suspension)	Report	2× (yellow card) 4× (suspension)	Palais des sports André-Brouat, Toulouse; Attendance: 3,274; Referees: Sekulić, Jovandić (SRB)

19 November 2024; 18:45	VfL Gummersbach (Germany)	32–24	(Iceland) FH Hafnarfjarðar	Schwalbe-Arena, Gummersbach; Attendance: 2,742; Referees: Klompers, Stobbe (NED)
19 November 2024; 18:45	Blohme 8	(16–10)	Andrason 6	Schwalbe-Arena, Gummersbach; Attendance: 2,742; Referees: Klompers, Stobbe (NED)
19 November 2024; 18:45	1× (suspension)	Report	1× (yellow card) 4× (suspension)	Schwalbe-Arena, Gummersbach; Attendance: 2,742; Referees: Klompers, Stobbe (NED)

19 November 2024; 20:45	Fenix Toulouse Handball (France)	30–33	(Sweden) IK Sävehof	Palais des sports André-Brouat, Toulouse; Attendance: 2,079; Referees: Leszczyński, Piechota (POL)
19 November 2024; 20:45	Ilić, Vieira 5	(15–13)	Mittún 8	Palais des sports André-Brouat, Toulouse; Attendance: 2,079; Referees: Leszczyński, Piechota (POL)
19 November 2024; 20:45	1× (yellow card) 2× (suspension)	Report	1× (suspension)	Palais des sports André-Brouat, Toulouse; Attendance: 2,079; Referees: Leszczyński, Piechota (POL)

26 November 2024; 18:45	IK Sävehof (Sweden)	25–28	(Germany) VfL Gummersbach	Partille Arena, Partille; Attendance: 1,065; Referees: Borge, Nygren (NOR)
26 November 2024; 18:45	Brolin 4	(10–14)	Tskhovrebadze 5	Partille Arena, Partille; Attendance: 1,065; Referees: Borge, Nygren (NOR)
26 November 2024; 18:45	3× (suspension)	Report	1× (suspension)	Partille Arena, Partille; Attendance: 1,065; Referees: Borge, Nygren (NOR)

26 November 2024; 20:45	FH Hafnarfjarðar (Iceland)	25–29	(France) Fenix Toulouse Handball	Kaplakriki, Hafnarfjörður; Attendance: 400; Referees: Kinnari, Skogberg (FIN)
26 November 2024; 20:45	Friðriksson, Andrason 6	(7–14)	Vieira 7	Kaplakriki, Hafnarfjörður; Attendance: 400; Referees: Kinnari, Skogberg (FIN)
26 November 2024; 20:45	1× (suspension)	Report	4× (suspension)	Kaplakriki, Hafnarfjörður; Attendance: 400; Referees: Kinnari, Skogberg (FIN)
