= Daniel Żółtak =

Polish handball player

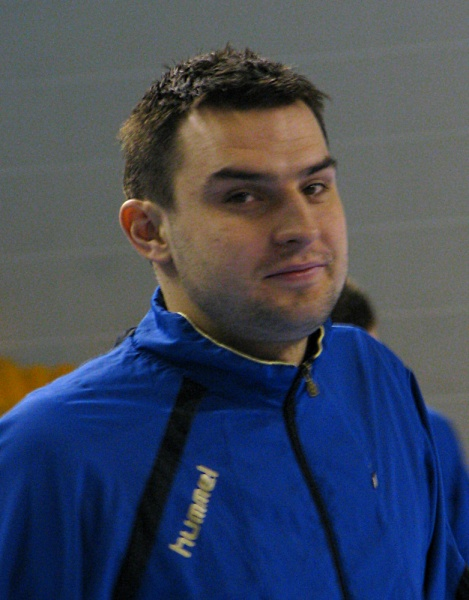

Personal information
- Nationality: Polish
- Born: 28 February 1982 (age 44) Olsztyn, Poland
- Height: 1.96 m (6 ft 5 in)

Sport
- Sport: Handball
- Position: Pivot

Senior clubs
- Years: Team
- 2000–2003: SMS Gdańsk
- 2003–2006: AZS-AWFiS Gdańsk
- 2006–2011: Vive Targi Kielce
- 2011–2012: Warmia Olsztyn
- 2012: Meshkov Brest
- 2012–2014: NMC Górnik Zabrze
- 2014–2016: Warmia Olsztyn
- 2016–2017: Meble Wójcik Elbląg
- 2017–2018: Warmia Olsztyn
National team
Years	Team	Apps	(Gls)
2004–2011	Poland	69	(42)
Medal record
Men's Handball
Representing Poland
World Championships
Bronze medal – third place	2009 Croatia	Team competition

Daniel Żółtak (born February 28, 1984) was a Polish handball player.

He played for the national team, winning a bronze medal in the World Handball Championship in 2009.
