= Ilchenko =

Ilchenko is a Ukrainian surname. Notable people with the surname include:

- Dmytro Ilchenko (born 1996), Ukrainian handball player
- Irina Ilchenko (born 1968), Russian volleyball player
- Larisa Ilchenko (born 1988), Russian long-distance swimmer
