= Dan Racoțea =

Romanian handball player (born 1995)

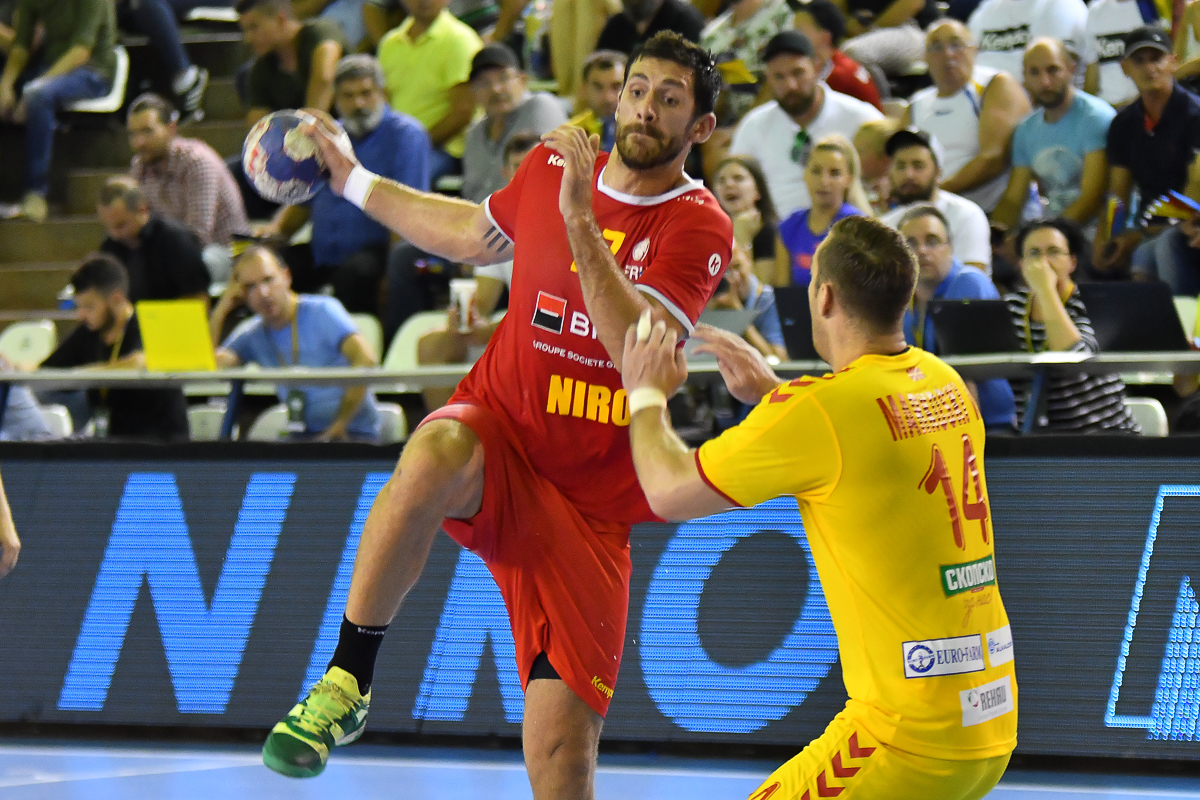

Personal information
- Full name: Dan Emil Racoțea
- Nationality: Romanian
- Born: 21 July 1995 (age 31) Brașov, Romania
- Height: 2.02 m (6 ft 7 1/2 in)

Sport
- Sport: Handball
- Position: Left back
- Current club: Dinamo București
- Number: 7

Youth career
- Years: Team
- 2008–2011: Centrul Național de Excelență Sighișoara

Senior clubs
- Years: Team
- 2012–2013: → Rom Cri Brașov
- 2013–2014: → CSM București
- 2014–2019: Wisła Płock
- 2019–2020: C' Chartres MHB
- 2020–2021: Bidasoa Irún
- 2021–2024: Dinamo București
- 2024–2025: Górnik Zabrze
National team
- Years: Team
- 2014–: Romania

Dan Emil Racoțea (born 21 July 1995) is a Romanian handball player who plays for Górnik Zabrze and the Romanian national team.

He participated in the 2012 European Youth Handball Championship and 2013 Youth World Handball Championship scoring 31 and 52 goals, respectively.
