= Patrik Liljestrand =

Swedish handball player (born 1966)

Personal information
- Full name: Bo Patrik Liljestrand
- Nationality: Swedish
- Born: 25 January 1966 (age 60) Uddevalla, Sweden
- Height: 1.92 m (6 ft 4 in)

Sport
- Sport: Handball
- Position: Goalkeeper

Youth career
- Years: Team
- –: GF Kroppskultur

Senior clubs
- Years: Team
- –1994: Ystads IF
- 1994–1995: Drammen HK
- 1995–1997: GF Kroppskultur
- 1997–2000: IFK Ystad
- 2000–2002: Stord IL
- 2000–2001: → HSG Nordhorn (loan)
National team
Years	Team	Apps	(Gls)
1988–1993	Sweden	22	(0)

Teams managed
- 2002–2003: Drammen HK
- 2003–2004: HSG Nordhorn (assistant)
- 2004–2008: TV Emsdetten
- 2008–2010: TuS Nettelstedt-Lübbecke
- 2010–2013: TV Emsdetten
- 2013–2015: NMC Górnik Zabrze
- 2015–2018: IFK Skövde
- 2018–2020: Energa MKS Kalisz
- 2020–2022: Unia Tarnów
- 2022–2024: Górnik Zabrze
- 2024–2025: Śląsk Wrocław
Medal record
Olympic Games
Silver medal – second place	1992 Barcelona	Team

Bo Patrik Liljestrand (born 25 January 1966) is a Swedish former handball player who competed in the 1992 Summer Olympics.

He was a member of the Swedish handball team which won the silver medal at the 1992 Summer Olympics.
