= Bartoszyce =

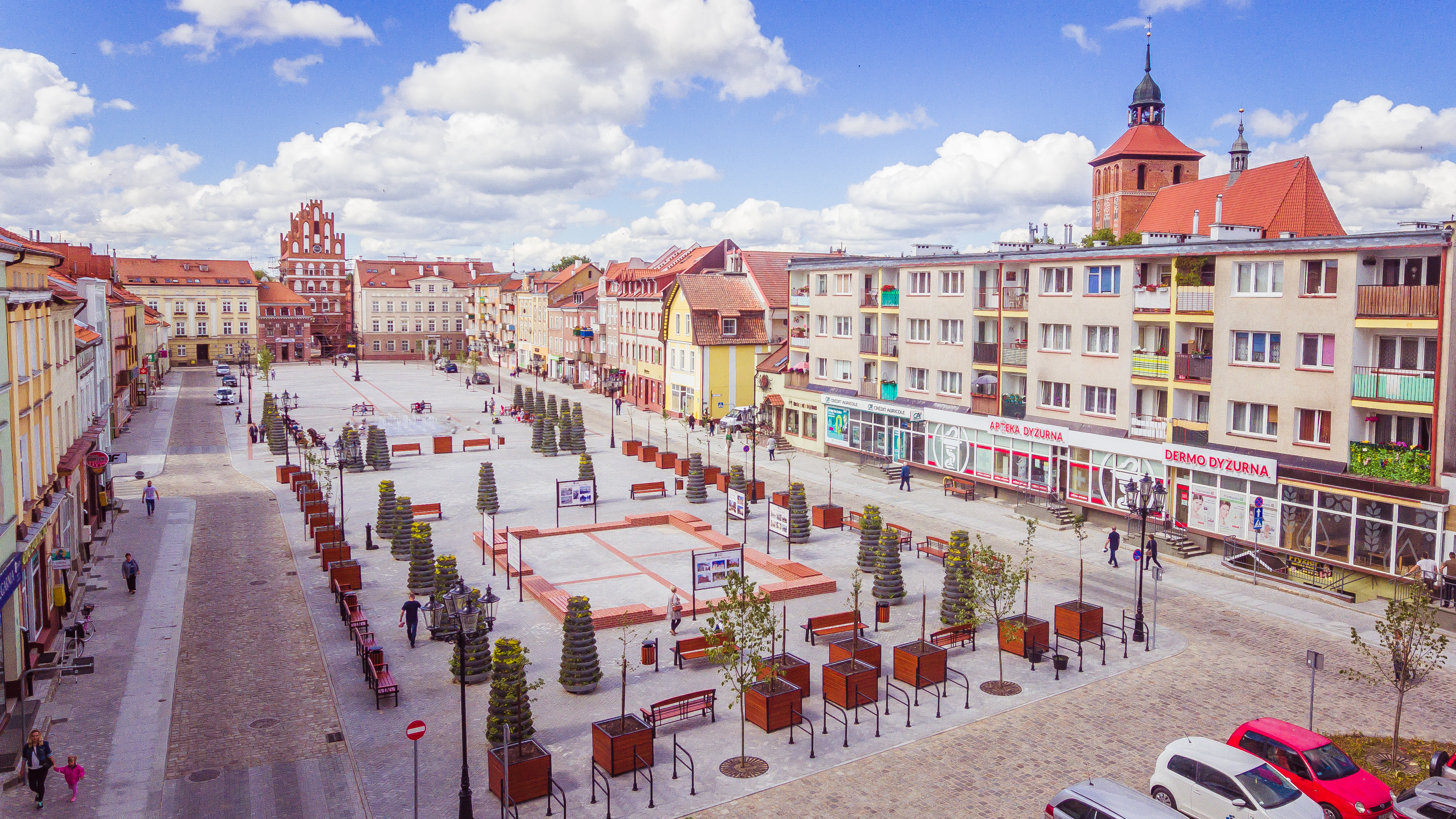
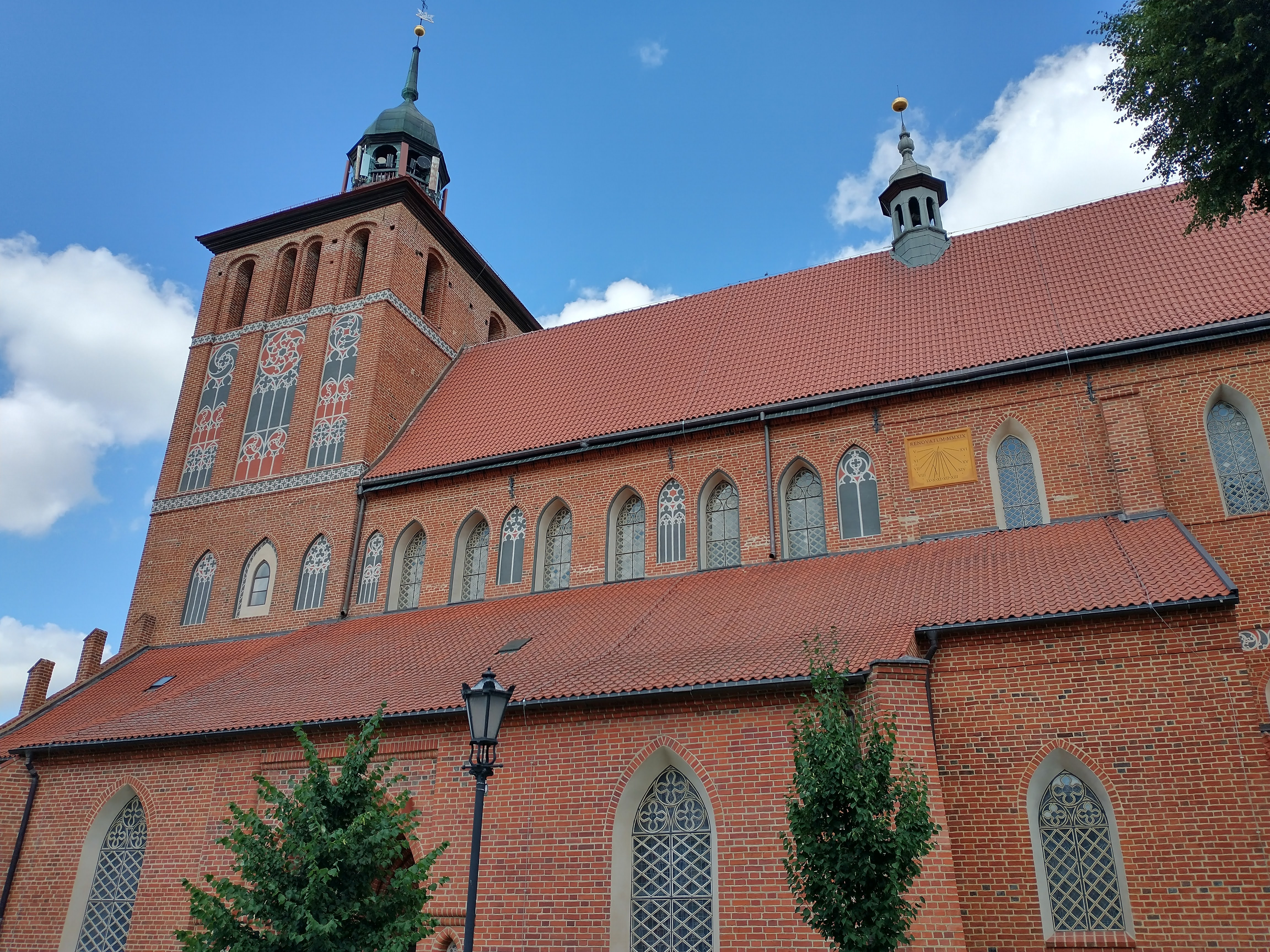
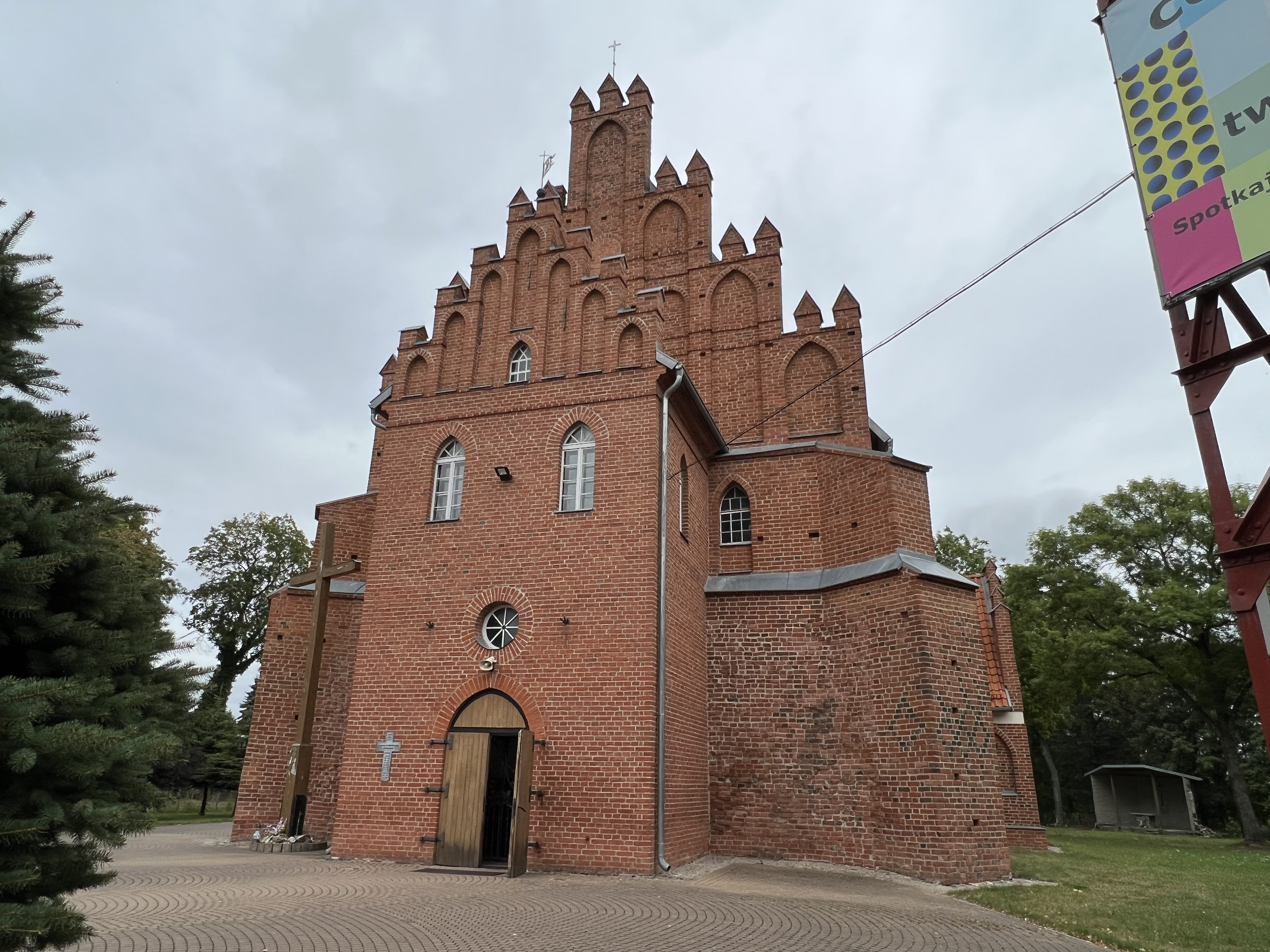
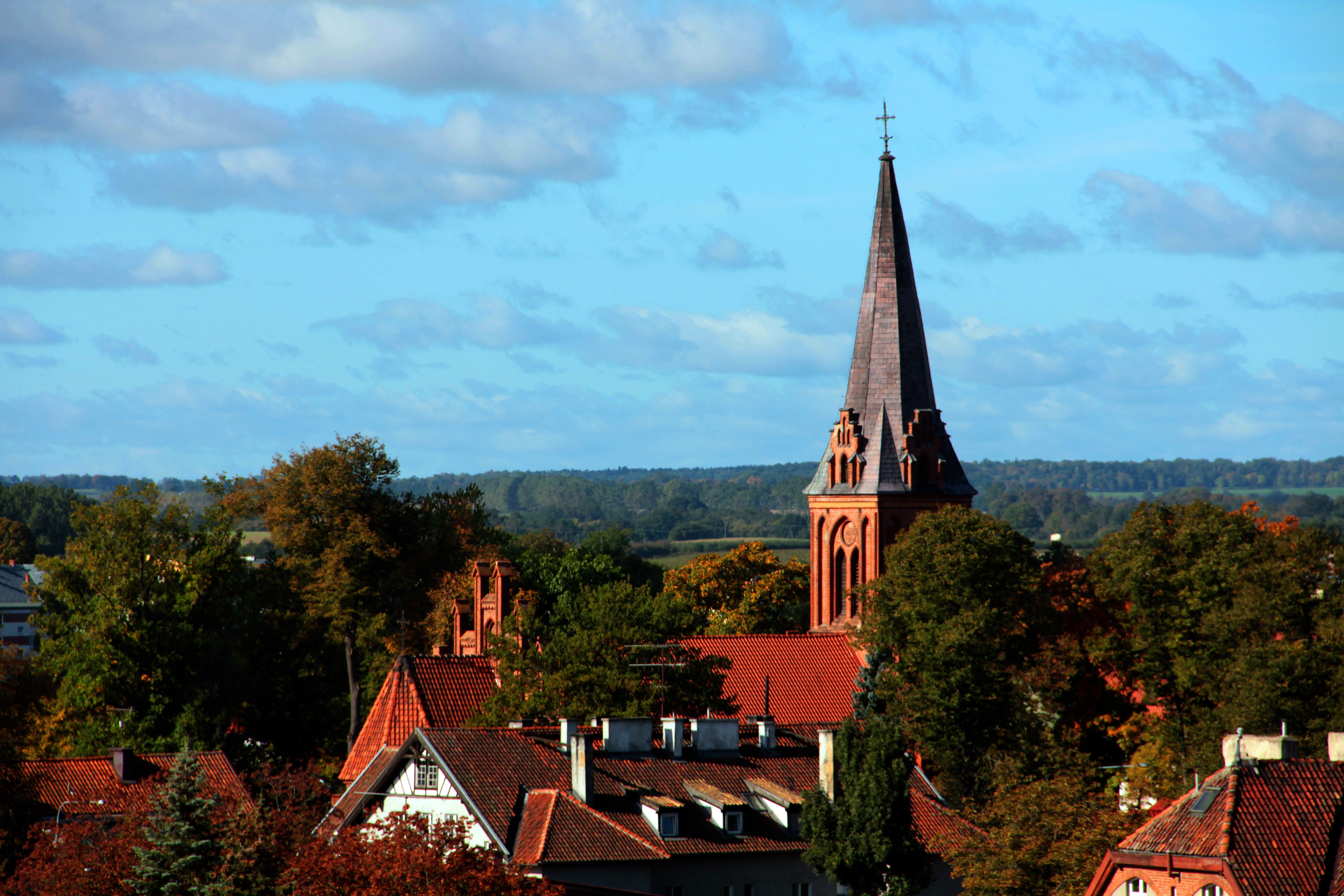
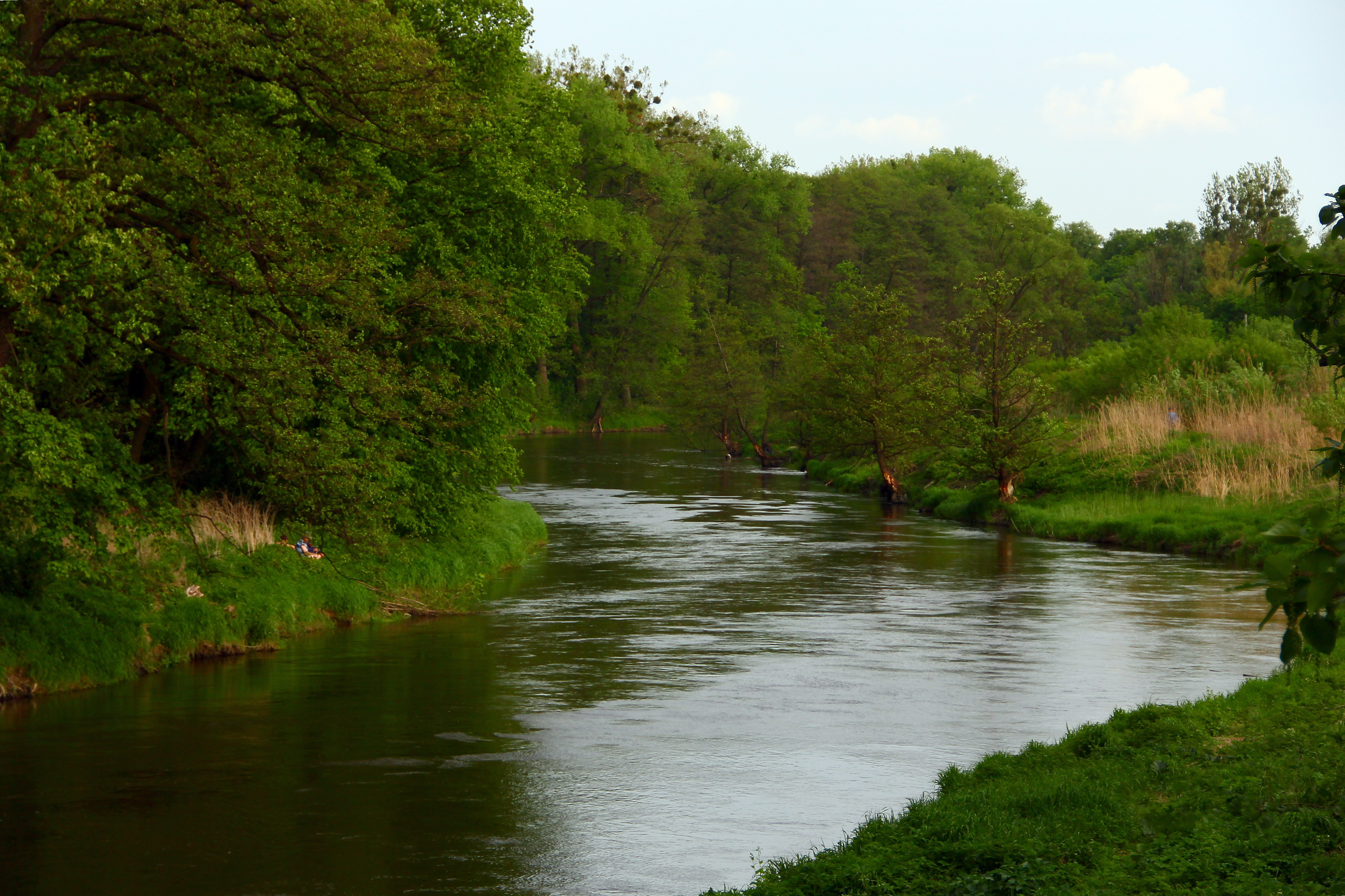
- Constitution of May 3 Square Saint John the Evangelist church Saint John the Baptist church Saint Bruno church Łyna River

- Flag Coat of arms

- Location within Poland
- Coordinates: 54°15′N 20°48′E
- Country: Poland
- Voivodeship: Warmian-Masurian
- County: Bartoszyce
- Gmina: Bartoszyce (urban gmina)
- Established: 1240
- Town rights: 1326

Government
  - Mayor: Wiesław Kurach (PO)

Area
  - Total: 11.79 km^{2} (4.55 sq mi)
- Elevation: 3 m (9.8 ft)

Population (2025-12-31)
  - Total: 20,767
  - Density: 1,761/km^{2} (4,562/sq mi)
- Time zone: UTC+1 (CET)
  - Summer (DST): UTC+2 (CEST)
- Postal code: 11-200
- Area code: +48 89
- Car plates: NBA
- Website: http://bartoszyce.pl

Bartoszyce (pronounced Barto-shitse [bartɔˈʂɨt͡sɛ]; German: Bartenstein, [ˈbaʁtn̩ʃtaɪn]) is a town on the Łyna River in northern Poland. It is the capital of Bartoszyce County within the Warmian-Masurian Voivodeship. It has 20,767 inhabitants.

== History ==
=== Middle Ages ===
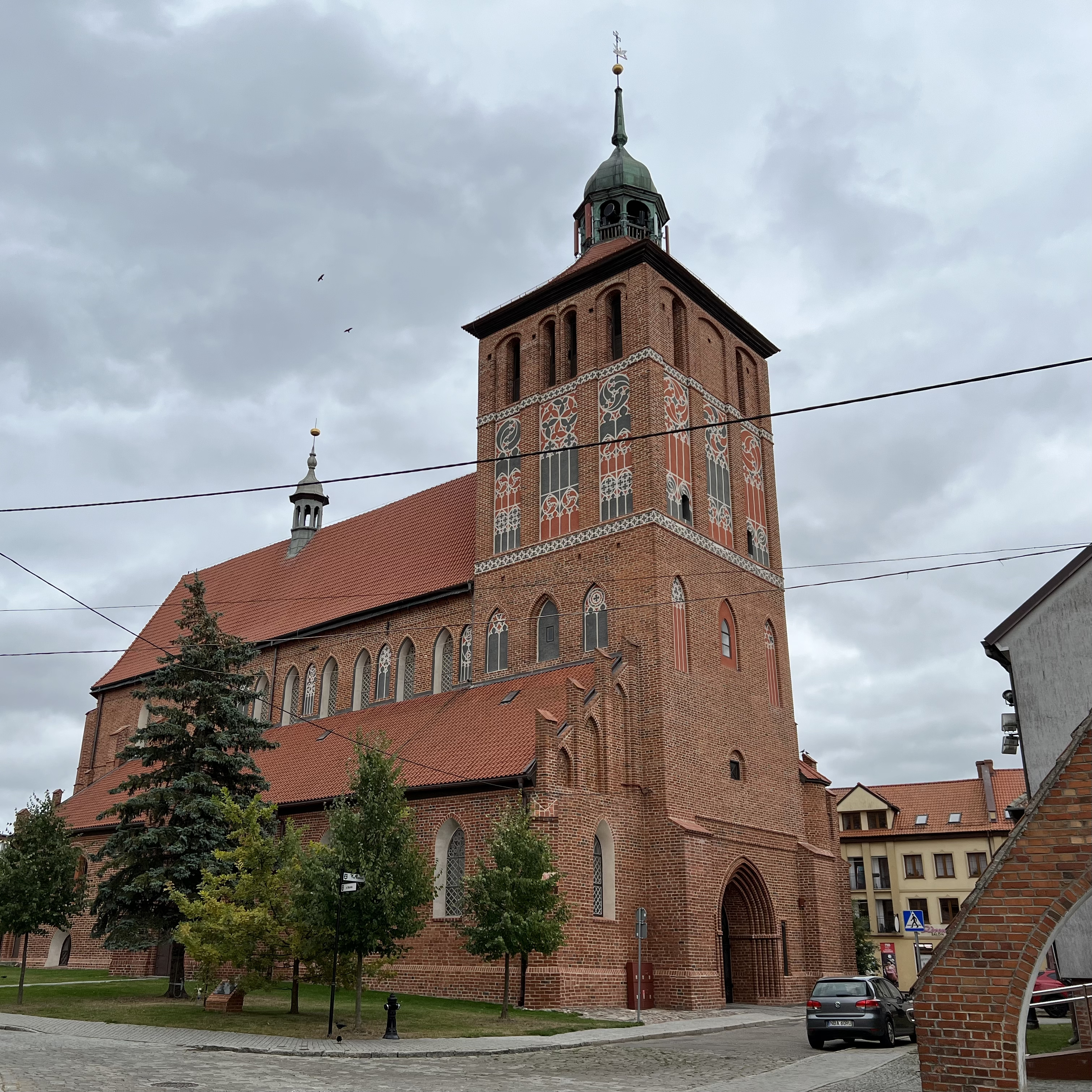
Gothic Saint John the Evangelist church, built after 1332, and expanded in 1360–80 and in the 15th century.

Around 1241 the Teutonic Knights constructed a castle on the left shore of the Łyna River on the border between the Old Prussian regions of Natangia and Bartia. The castle was part of the district (Komturei) of Balga. It was first composed of stone houses, palisades, and earthworks and later built of bricks.

Besieged by the native Old Prussians for four years during an uprising beginning in 1260, the castle was destroyed in 1264. The Order rebuilt it shortly afterward, but it was besieged by another Baltic group, the Sudovians, in 1273. After the Old Prussian uprisings ended, the Knights rebuilt the Ordensburg out of stone from 1274–80. During the 14th and 15th centuries, the castle was managed by the Komtur (administrator) of Balga.

Thereafter, a settlement developed near the castle on the right shore of the Alle River opposite the castle. First documented in 1326 under the name Rosenthal, it received town privileges from the Teutonic Grand Master Luther von Braunschweig in 1332. After that the name was changed to Bartenstein and the settlement of Rosenthal below the castle on the left shore of the river was relocated, as the left side had become too endangered by warfare. Poles settled in sizeable numbers in Bartenstein from the 14th to the 17th century. The town's Polish residents used the Polish names Bartoszyce and Barsztyn. The town's Teutonic Order administrator (German: Komtur), Henning Schindekopf of Balga, began construction of a wall around the town in 1353.

In 1440, the town joined the anti-Teutonic Prussian Confederation, upon the request of which Polish King Casimir IV Jagiellon incorporated the region and town to the Kingdom of Poland in 1454. At the beginning of the subsequent Thirteen Years' War, the Teutonic castle was destroyed and was not rebuilt afterward. However, the residents of Bartenstein became reconciled with the Teutonic Knights in 1460. By the peace treaty signed in Toruń in 1466, the town became part of Poland as a fief held by the State of the Teutonic Order. The town's seal was attached to the documents of the peace treaty. To stabilize the Order's financial situation, the Order sold the ruined castle's farmyard and meadows to Wend von Eulenburg in 1469; the entire manor of Bartenstein was sold in 1513 to Heinrich Reuß von Plauen (not the Grand Master).

=== Modern era ===
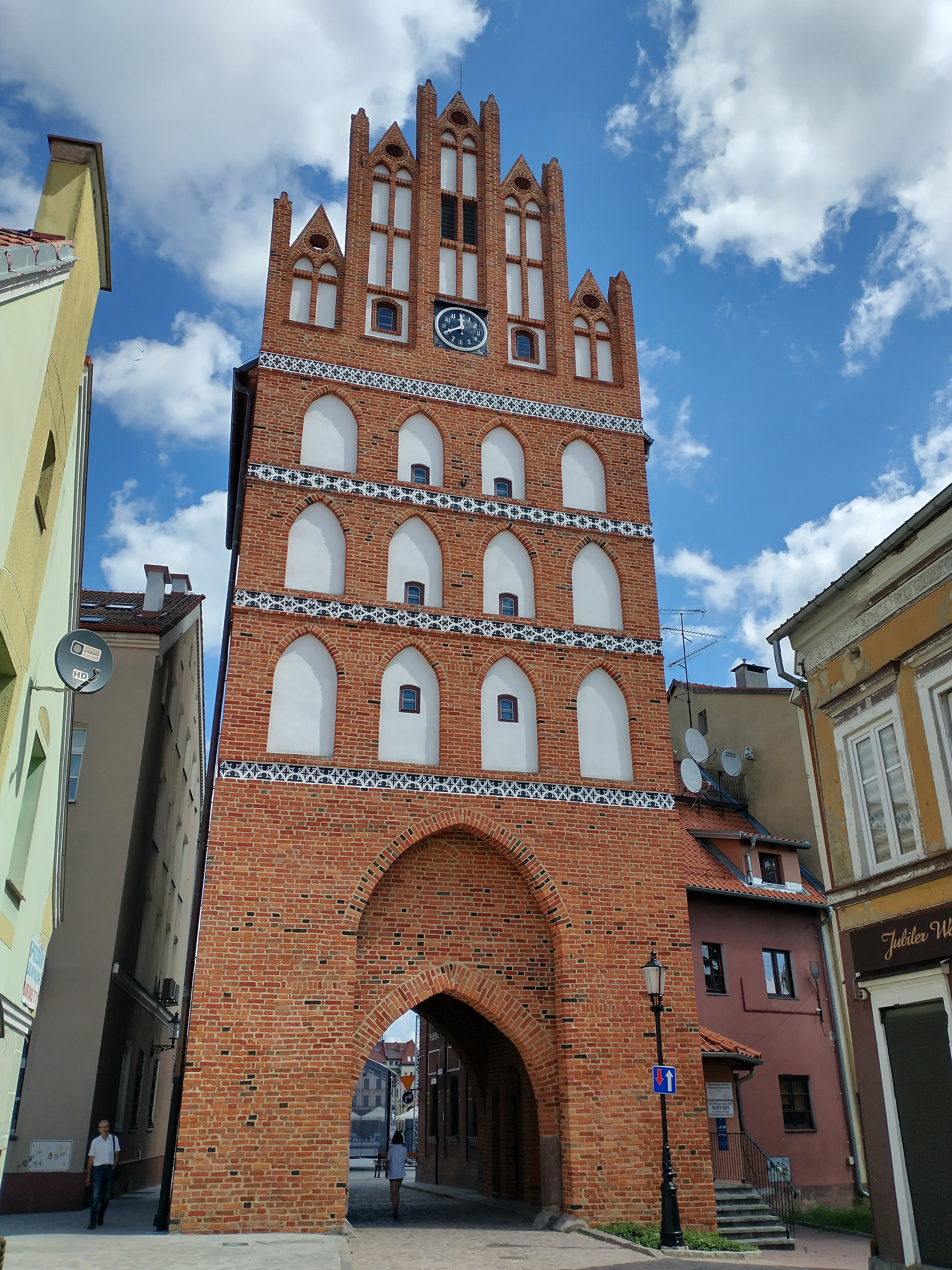
Lidzbarska Gate in the town centre.

With the secularization of the Teutonic Order's Prussian territories in 1525, the town became part of the Duchy of Prussia, established with the consent of the Polish king Sigismund I the Old, as a vassal state of the Polish Crown. The town converted to Protestantism in the same year during the Protestant Reformation.

Bartenstein became part of the secular Kingdom of Prussia in 1701 and the Prussian Province of East Prussia in 1773. During the Napoleonic Wars, Prussia and the Russian Empire signed a treaty of alliance in the town on 26 April 1807, the Treaty of Bartenstein. Administrative reform following the Napoleonic Wars placed Bartenstein within East Prussia's Landkreis Friedland in 1818. The town was subjected to Germanisation policies, and although the post of a Polish preacher still existed in 1829, the appointed preacher did not speak Polish.

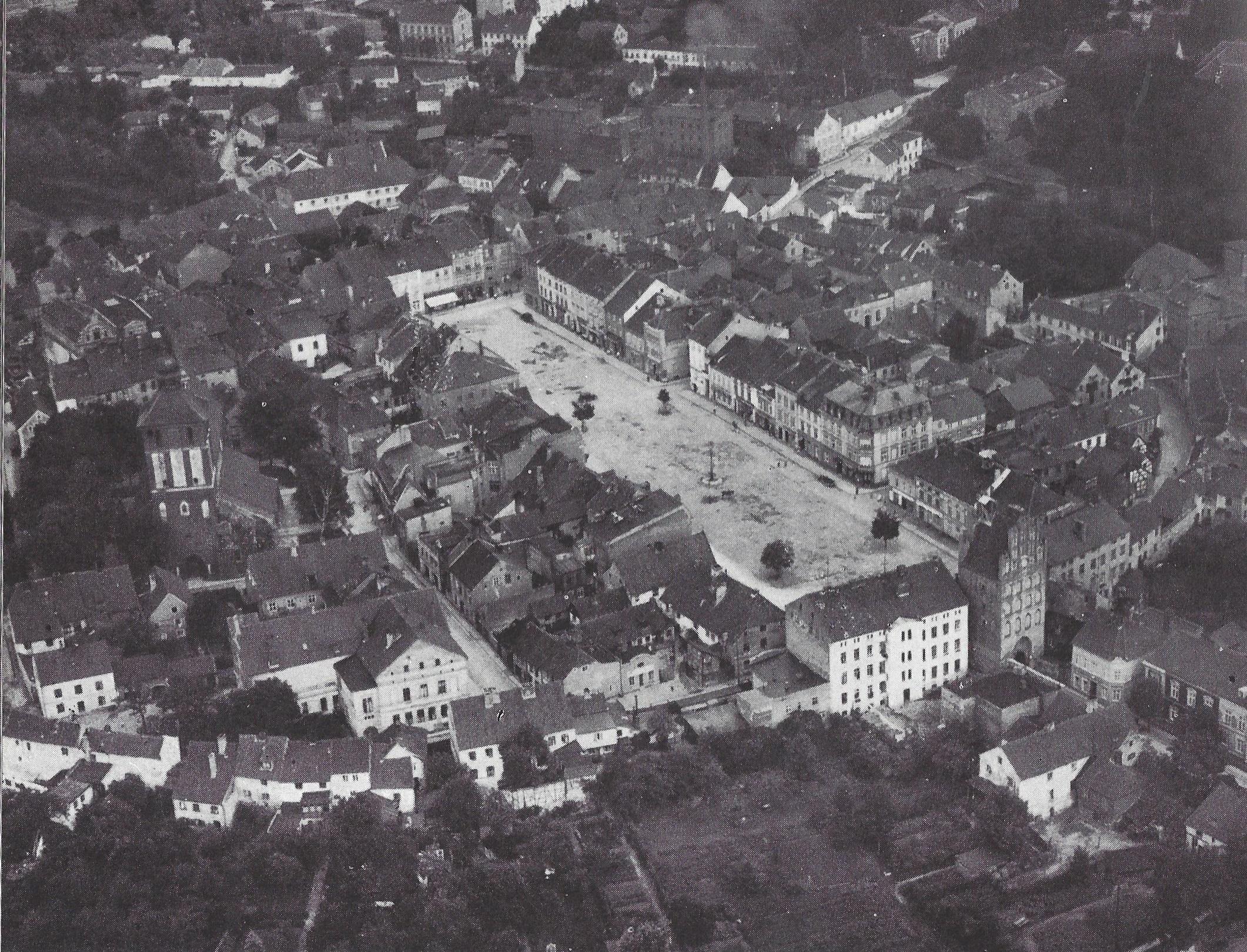
Bartenstein in the early 20th century.

The Lyck-Bartenstein (Ełk–Bartoszyce) train line ran through the town in 1868, leading to the establishment of industries, including an iron foundry, a machine factory, and a train-car factory. It was also noted for its oak trade. A garrison town for the Prussian Army, Bartenstein was the seat of the district court. Because it had grown to become the largest town in Landkreis Friedland during the 19th century, the town was made the district capital in 1902. Landkreis Friedland was renamed Landkreis Bartenstein in 1927. The foundations of the old castle were used in the construction of the administrative seat; this building was destroyed in 1945.

During World War II, the Germans operated a forced labour subcamp of the Stalag I-B prisoner-of-war camp in the town. The town was 50% destroyed in fighting between German forces and the Soviet Red Army. After German surrender, the Soviets ceremoniously transferred sovereignty over the town to Polish authorities on June 15, 1945. The already established Polish rule was accepted at the Potsdam Conference, however, on preliminary terms. Remaining German residents who had survived were either evacuated or later expelled, and the town was repopulated with Poles. The transfer was confirmed by the German–Polish Border Treaty.

As part of the repressions against the Catholic Church, the communists created a special military unit in Bartoszyce, to which they forcibly conscripted students of theological seminaries. The future priest Jerzy Popiełuszko did his military service there in 1966–1968. He initiated resistance, for which he was repeatedly punished, affecting his health for the rest of his life. There is a memorial to Jerzy Popiełuszko in Bartoszyce.

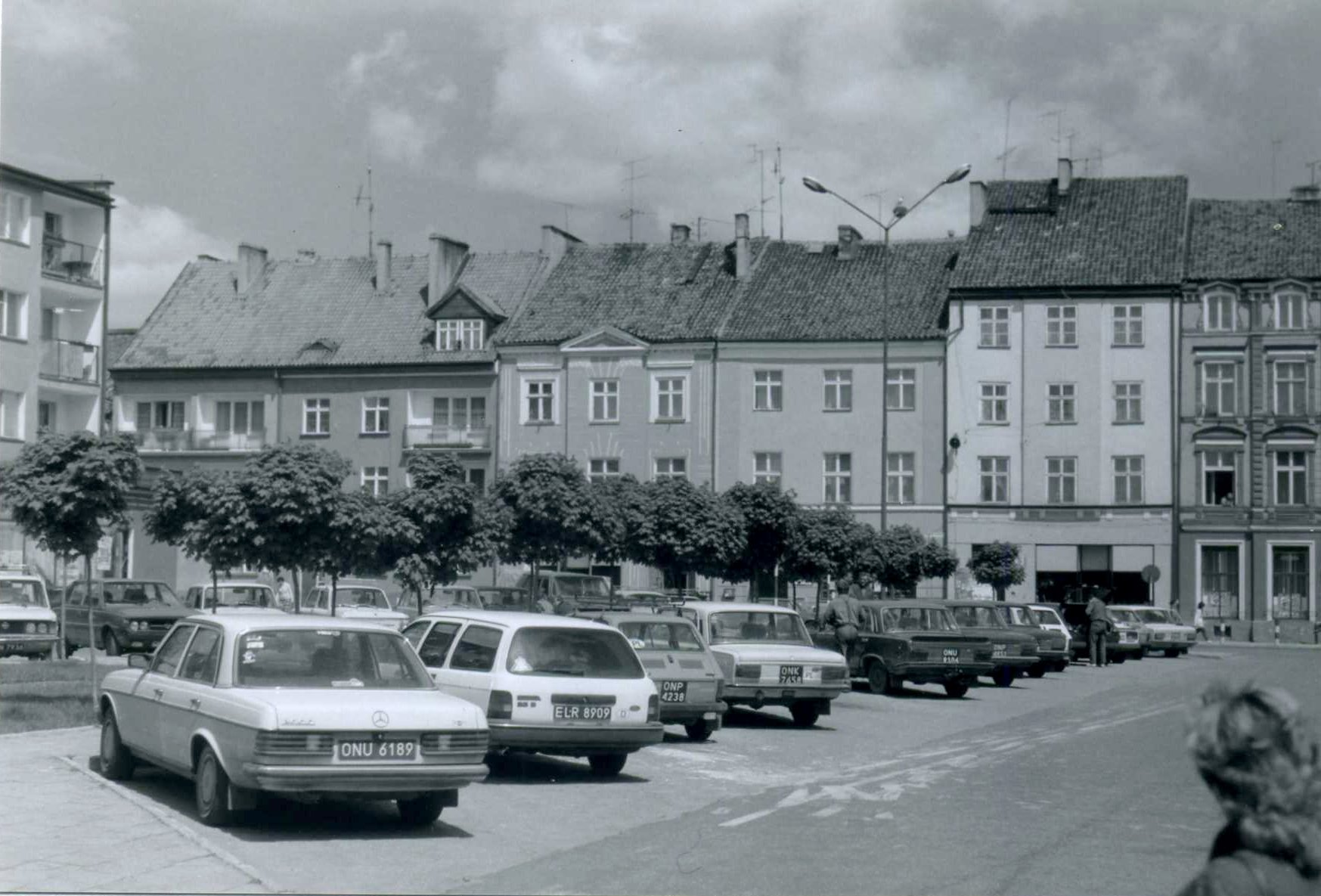
Bartoszyce in 1991.

Bartoszyce was administratively located in Olsztyn Voivodeship from 1946 to 1998. It became part of the Warmian-Masurian Voivodeship in 1999.

== Geography ==
Bartoszyce lies on the left shore of river Łyna River in a valley, approximately 90 kilometres (56 miles) east of Elbląg and 55 kilometres (34 miles) south of Kaliningrad, at an altitude of 3 metres (9.8 feet) above sea level.

== Demographics ==
Historical population

Year	Pop.	±%
1729	2,000	—
1785	2,780	+39.0%
1831	3,603	+29.6%
1875	6,460	+79.3%
1880	7,132	+10.4%
1890	6,442	−9.7%
1905	6,805	+5.6%
1925	7,890	+15.9%

Year	Pop.	±%
1933	8,717	+10.5%
1939	11,268	+29.3%
1978	19,288	+71.2%
1988	24,449	+26.8%
2002	25,771	+5.4%
2011	25,022	−2.9%
2021	22,281	−11.0%

Figures from 1729 to 1939 are based on primary, potentially biased, sources.
Source:, Statistics Poland

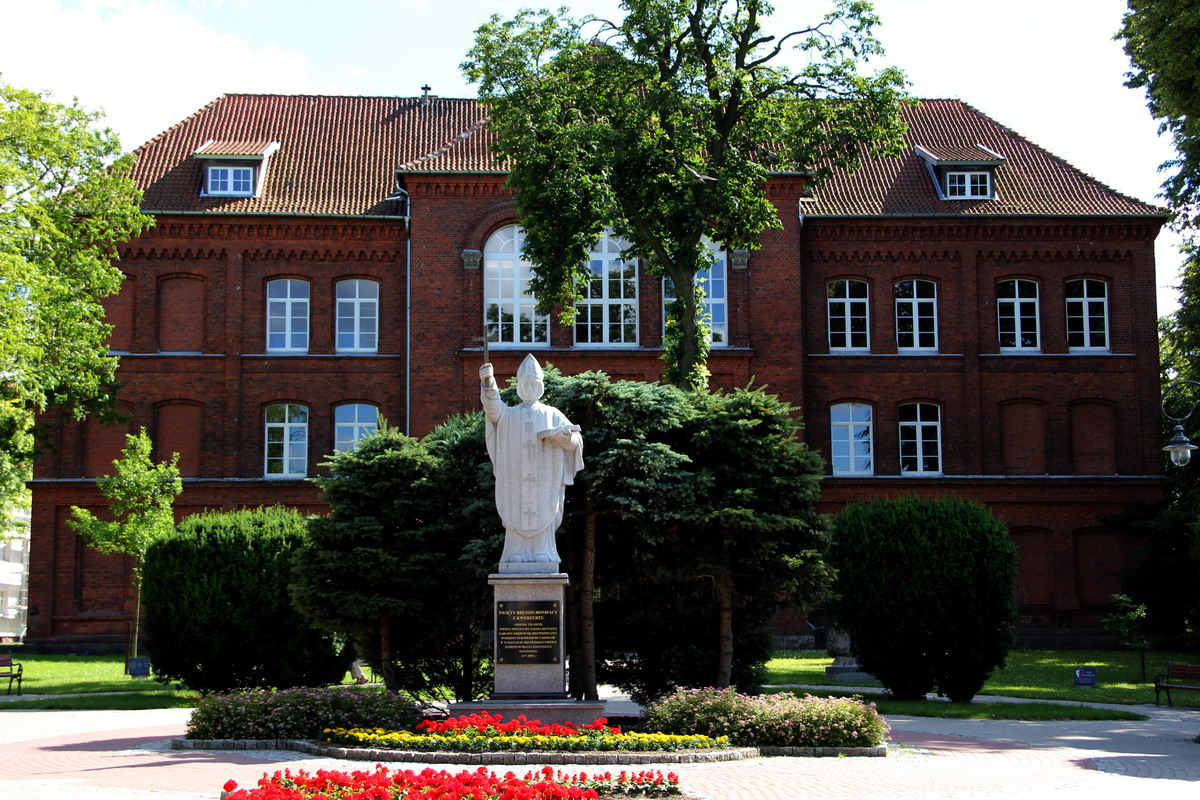
Liceum Ogólnokształcące im. Stefana Żeromskiego (a high school).

== Popular culture ==
The town is the location of a scene in Leo Tolstoy's War and Peace.

== International relations ==
Bartoszyce is a member of Cittaslow.

=== Twin towns – sister cities ===
Bartoszyce is twinned with:

- Berezne, Ukraine
- Emmaboda, Sweden
- Mława, Poland
- Nienburg, Germany
- Varėna, Lithuania

=== Former twin towns ===
- Bagrationovsk, Russia

On 25 March 2022, Bartoszyce County decided to terminate its cooperation with Russian city of Bagrationovsk as a response to the 2022 Russian invasion of Ukraine.

== Notable people ==
- Matthäus Waissel (1540–1602), German theologian, lutist, author
- Max Baginski (1864–1943), German–American anarchist
- Hans Koch (1893–1945), German anti–Nazi resistance fighter
- Erwin Geschonneck (1906–2008), German actor
- Günther Schack (1917–2003), German fighter pilot
- Hans-Joachim Reske (born 1940), German athlete
- Zbigniew Lubiejewski (born 1949), Polish volleyball player
- Marek Daćko (born 1991), Polish handball player
- Mateusz Czunkiewicz (born 1996), Polish volleyball player
