= Adrian Kondratiuk =

Polish handball player (born 1993)

Personal information
- Nationality: Polish
- Born: 23 February 1993 (age 33) Legnica, Poland
- Height: 1.85 m (6 ft 1 in)

Sport
- Sport: Handball
- Position: Centre back
- Current club: Wybrzeże Gdańsk
- Number: 23

Senior clubs
- Years: Team
- 2009–2012: SMS Gdańsk
- 2012–2019: Wybrzeże Gdańsk
- 2019–: NMC Górnik Zabrze
National team
Years	Team	Apps	(Gls)
2017–	Poland	26	(35)

Adrian Kondratiuk (born 23 February 1993) is a Polish handball player for Wybrzeże Gdańsk and the Polish national team.

He represented Poland at the 2020 European Men's Handball Championship.
