= Górnik Zabrze (handball) =

Polish handball club

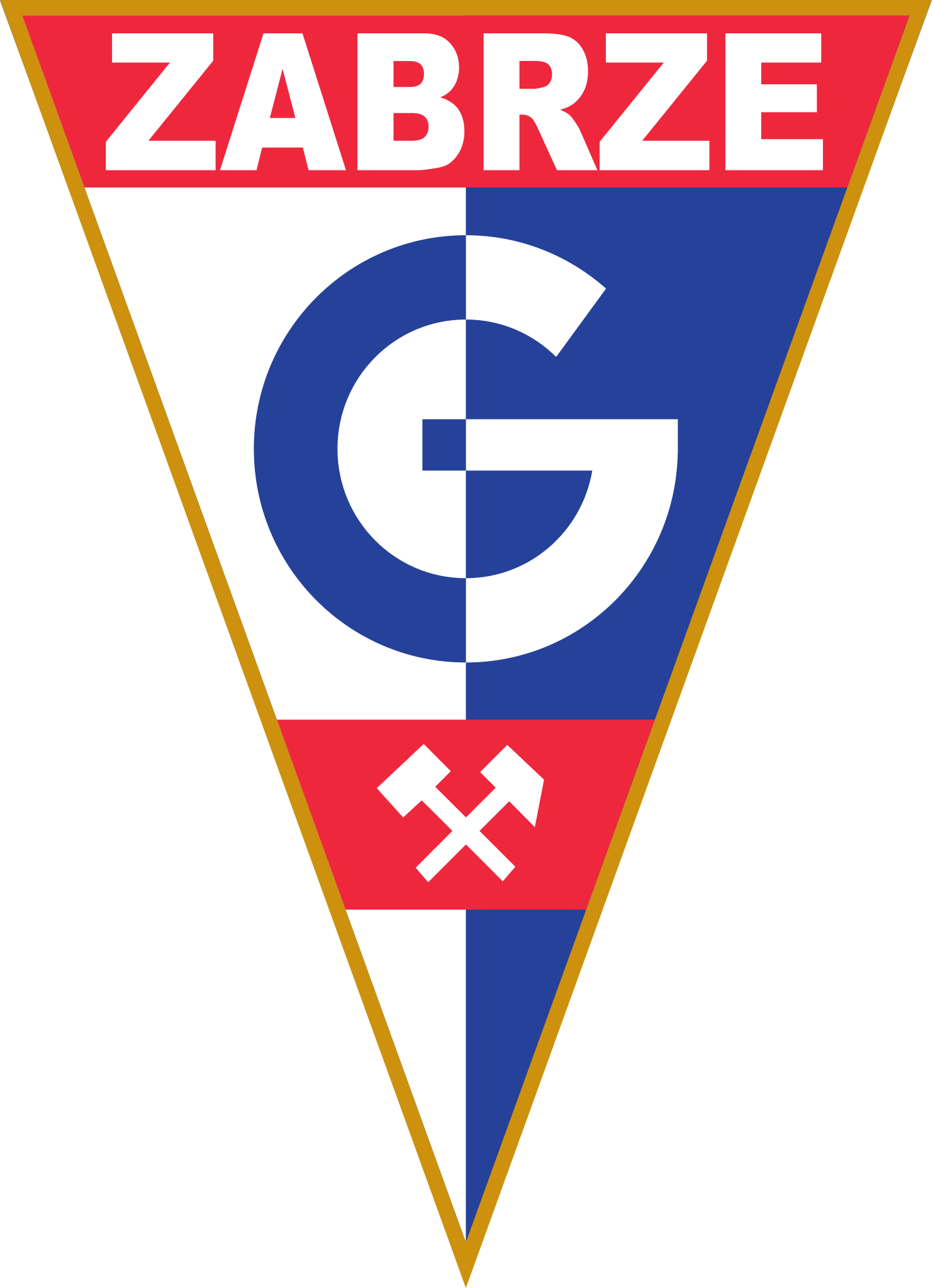
- Full name: Górnik Zabrze Piłka Ręczna Spółka Akcyjna
- Nickname(s): Trójkolorowi (Tri-Colour); Górnicy (The Miners)
- Founded: 1947
- Dissolved: 2025
- Arena: Hala sportowa "Pogoń Zabrze"
- Capacity: 1,013
- League: Polish Superliga
- Club colours
| Home | Away |

Górnik Zabrze was a professional handball club from Zabrze, Poland, that used to play in the Polish Superliga.

Location of Górnik Zabrze

== History ==
The creation of the handball division dates back to 1947, when Pogoń Zabrze, founded in 1945, decided to create a handball division in addition to football and gymnastics. The creator of Pogoń handball was Józef Cholewa. In 1959, Pogoń's handball players were promoted to the first league and finished 6th in their debut season. In the 1966/1967 season, the club won the bronze medal of the Polish championship. Then the club was relegated from the first division. In the years 1973–2000, he played again in the first league. In the 1975/1976 and 1978/1979 seasons, he won a silver medal in the Polish championship. 1984 and 1988, the team won the Polish Cup. In the 1988/1989 season, the team took 2nd place in the table behind Wybrzeże Gdańsk. In the final of the championship, they defeated the favorite team from Gdańsk 2:1, thereby becoming the Polish champion. The members of the championship team: Piotr Bar, Roman Honysa, Antoni Parecki, Waldemar Strzelec (goalkeepers), Grzegorz Bil, Szymon Dobrzyński, Jarosław Frąckowiak, Zygfryd Jędrzej, Jacek Kalisz, Marek Kąpa (captain), Piotr Konitz, Wincenty Markowski, Ryszard Masłoń, Robert Niedźwiedzki, Wojciech Piątek, Leszek Sadowy, Andrzej Staszewski. Coach: Tadeusz Szymczyk. In the 1989/1990 season, the team won its second league title and its third cup victory. The members of the team: Piotr Bar, Antoni Parecki, Waldemar Strzelec (goalkeepers), Bogusław Ciężki, Szymon Dobrzyński, Jarosław Frąckowiak, Jacek Kalisz, Marek Kąpa (captain), Krzysztof Kędra, Wincenty Markowski, Ryszard Masłoń, Robert Niedźwiedzki, Wojciech Piątek, Leszek Sadowy, Andrzej Staszewski. Coach: Tadeusz Szymczyk. It was relegated from the top league in the 1999/2000 season. He returned to the top league in the 2001/2002 season. The team commuted up and down for a while between the first and second divisions. After many years, in the 2013/2014 season, the team again won the bronze medal in the Polish championship. Górnik's most successful player in the league was Michał Kubisztal, who scored 194 goals and became the top scorer of the Polish Superliga. Mariusz Jurasik (167 goals) and Bartłomiej Tomczak (148 goals) also ranked high on the goalscoring list. In 2020, 2023 and 2024, the team won bronze medals again.

== Crest, colours, supporters ==
=== Kit manufacturers ===
| Period | Kit manufacturer |
|---|---|
| 2021–present | (Spain) Joma |

=== Kits ===
HOME

2023–25

AWAY
| 2023–24 | 2024–25 |

== Sports Hall information ==
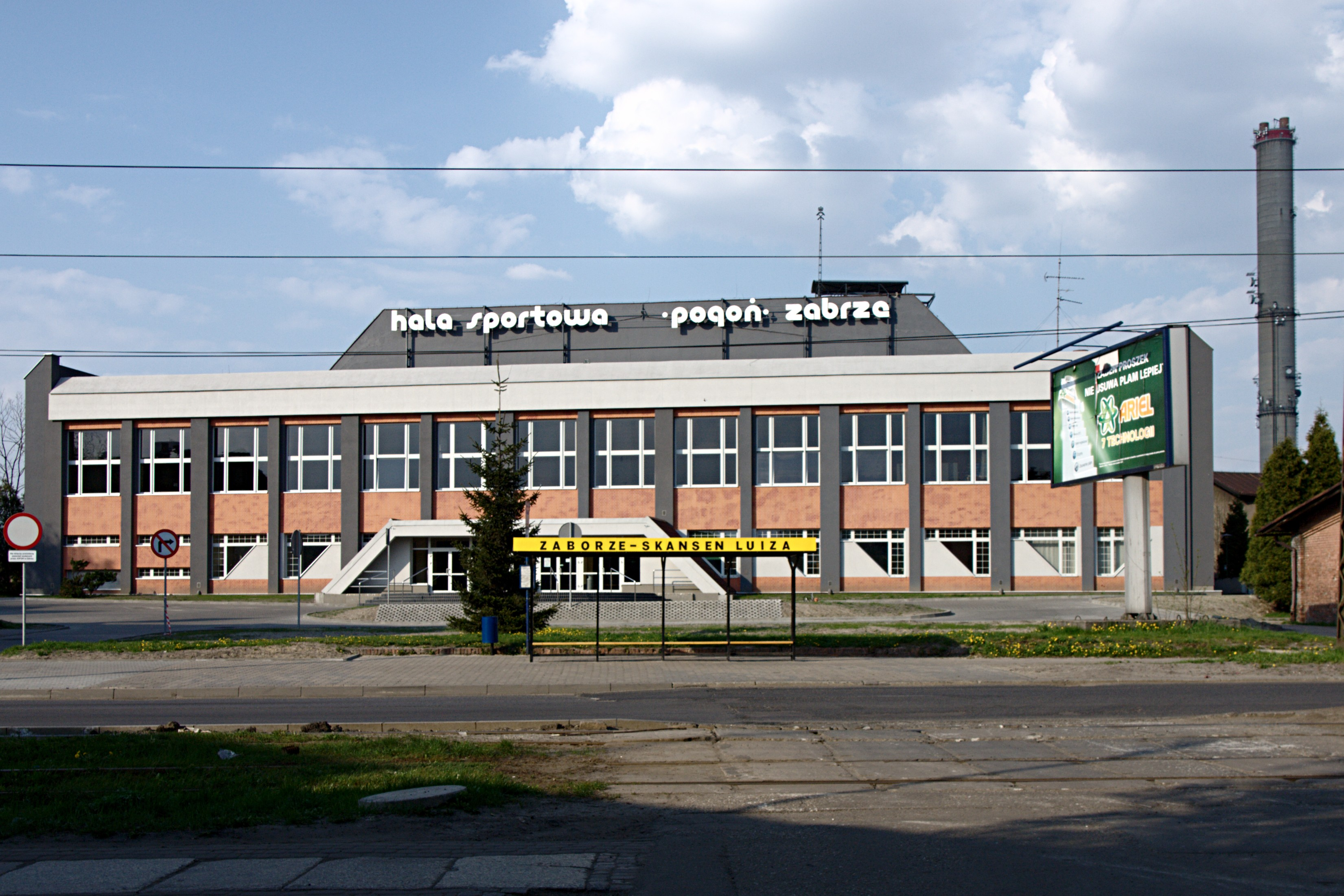
Home hall: Hala sportowa "Pogoń Zabrze"

- Arena: - Hala sportowa "Pogoń Zabrze"
- City: - Zabrze
- Capacity: - 1000
- Address: - Wolności 406, 41-800 Zabrze, Poland.

== Management ==
| Position | Name |
|---|---|
| President | (Poland) Bogdan Kmiecik |
| Executive Director | (Poland) Dariusz Czernik |

== Team ==
=== Current squad ===
Squad for the 2024–25 season

Goalkeepers

- 1 (Poland) Kacper Ligarzewski
- 16 (Poland) Piotr Wyszomirski
- 50 (Poland) Bartosz Szczepanik

Left wingers

- 15 (Ukraine) Dmytro Artemenko
- 23 (Poland) Jakub Bogacz

Right wingers

- 3 (Poland) Jakub Szyszko
- 58 (Poland) Krzysztof Komarzewski

Line players

- 14 (Poland) Piotr Krępa
- 77 (Ukraine) Dmytro Ilchenko
- 89 (Poland) Adam Wąsowski

Left backs

- 5 (Poland) Jakub Pinda
- 7 (Romania) Dan Racoțea
- 29 (Poland) Szymon Pluczyk

Centre backs

- 10 (Czech Republic) Lukáš Mořkovský
- 19 (Poland) Paweł Krawczyk
- 35 (Ukraine) Taras Minotskyi

Right backs

- 9 (Poland) Daniel Wisiński
- 22 (Serbia) Nikola Ivanović
- 24 (Poland) Szymon Działakiewicz

=== Transfers ===
Transfers for the 2026–27 season

Joining

Leaving

- (Ukraine) Dmytro Ilchenko (LP) to (Poland) KPR Legionowo

=== Transfer History ===
Transfers for the 2025–26 season

Joining

Leaving

- (Romania) Dan Racoțea (LB) to (Poland) KS Azoty-Puławy
- (Ukraine) Dmytro Artemenko (LW) to (Poland) KS Azoty-Puławy
- (Ukraine) Taras Minotskyi (LB) to (France) US Dunkerque HB
- (Czech Republic) Lukáš Mořkovský (CB) to (Czech Republic) HC Zubří
- (Poland) Krzysztof Komarzewski (RW) to (Poland) KS Azoty-Puławy
- (Poland) Szymon Działakiewicz (RB) to (Poland) KS Azoty-Puławy
- (Poland) Piotr Wyszomirski (GK) to (Poland) Energa MKS Kalisz
- (Poland) Jakub Szyszko (RW) to (Poland) Orlen Wisła Płock
- (Poland) Kacper Ligarzewski (GK) to (Poland) KPR Ostrovia
- (Poland) Adam Wąsowski (LP) to (Poland) Stal Mielec
- (Poland) Paweł Krawczyk (CB) to (Germany) ASV Hamm-Westfalen
- (Poland) Daniel Wisiński (RB) to (Poland) KS Azoty-Puławy
- (Poland) Bartosz Szczepanik (GK) (retires)
- (Poland) Jakub Bogacz (LW) (to (Poland) Sandra Spa Pogoń Szczecin)
- (Poland) Jakub Pinda (LB) (to (Poland) Zepter KPR Legionowo)
- (Poland) Szymon Pluczyk (LB) (to (Poland) Olimpia Medex Piekary Śląskie)
- (Serbia) Nikola Ivanović (RB) (to ?)
- (Poland) Piotr Krępa (P) (to (Poland) Orzeł Przeworsk)

== Honours ==
- Polish Superliga:
  - Gold (2): 1989, 1990
  - Silver (3): 1976, 1979, 1988
  - Bronze (7): 1967, 1985, 1987, 2014, 2020, 2023, 2024
- Polish Cup:
  - Gold (3): 1984, 1988, 1990
  - Bronze (3): 2015, 2016, 2018

=== Individual awards ===
==== Domestic ====
Polish Superliga Top Scorer

| Season | Name | Goals |
|---|---|---|
| 2013–14 | (Poland) Michał Kubisztal | 194 |

== EHF ranking ==
As of 20 November 2024

| Rank | Team | Points |
|---|---|---|
| 39 | (Norway) Elverum Håndball | 122 |
| 40 | (Romania) CSM Constanta | 118 |
| 41 | (North Macedonia) RK Vardar | 114 |
| 42 | (Poland) Górnik Zabrze | 111 |
| 43 | (Czech Republic) HCB Karviná | 111 |
| 44 | (Turkey) Beşiktaş JK | 110 |
| 45 | (Germany) Frisch Auf Göppingen | 108 |

== Former club members ==
=== Notable former players ===
The list includes players who have played at least once for their national team or spent at least 10 years with the team.

==== Goalkeepers ====
- (Poland) Mateusz Kornecki (2013–2019)
- (Poland) Antoni Parecki (1985–1991)
- (Poland) Jakub Skrzyniarz (2019–2022)
- (Poland) Mieczysław Wojczak (1972–1980)
- (Poland) Sebastian Suchowicz (2013–2015)
- (Poland) Piotr Wyszomirski (2022–)
- (Belarus) (Poland) Kazimir Kotlinski (2012–2013)
- (Czech Republic) Martin Galia (2016–2022)

==== Right wingers ====
- (Poland) Krystian Bondzior (2019–2022)
- (Poland) Krzysztof Komarzewski (2024–)
- (Poland) Patryk Kuchczyński (2012–2015)
- (Poland) Patryk Mauer (2022–2024)
- (Poland) Arkadiusz Miszka (1999–2001)
- (Poland) Jakub Szyszko (2023–)

==== Left wingers ====
- (Poland) Michał Chodara (2009–2010)
- (Poland) Jan Czuwara (2018–2021)
- (Poland) Bartłomiej Tomczak (2013–2021)
- (Ukraine) Dmytro Artemenko (2022–)

==== Line players ====
- (Poland) Bartłomiej Bis (2019–2022)
- (Poland) Marek Daćko (2014–2021)
- (Poland) Daniel Żółtak (2012–2014)
- (Belarus) Yuri Gromyko (2014–2019)
- (Ukraine) Dmytro Ilchenko (2022–)

==== Left backs ====
- (Poland) Michał Adamuszek (2015–2022)
- (Poland) Jarosław Frąckowiak (1978–1990, 1992–1993)
- (Poland) Hubert Kornecki (2018–2019)
- (Poland) Michał Kubisztal (2013–2015)
- (Poland) Damian Przytuła (2021–2024)
- (Poland) Szymon Sićko (2018–2020)
- (Poland) Adam Twardo (2013–2015)
- (Romania) Dan Racoțea (2024–)
- (Russia) Alexander Tatarintsev (2014–2016, 2017–2020)

==== Central backs ====
- (Poland) Rafał Gliński (2015–2021)
- (Poland) Adrian Kondratiuk (2019–2022)
- (Poland) Krzysztof Łyżwa (2019–2023)
- (Poland) Kamil Mokrzki (2011–2014)
- (Poland) Paweł Niewrzawa (2014–2016)
- (Poland) Tomasz Rosiński (1998–2003)
- (Belarus) Aliaksandr Bachko (2022–2024)
- (Czech Republic) Lukáš Mořkovský (2023–)
- (Ukraine) Taras Minotskyi (2023–)
- (Ukraine) Vitaliy Nat (2011–2014)

==== Right backs ====
- (Poland) Piotr Adamczak (2012–2013)
- (Poland) Ignacy Bąk (2017–2020)
- (Poland) Szymon Działakiewicz (2025–)
- (Poland) Mariusz Jurasik (2012–2016)
- (Poland) Robert Orzechowski (2013–2015)
- (Poland) Sebastian Rumniak (2012–2013)
- (Netherlands) Iso Sluijters (2016–2021)
- (Ukraine) Bogdan Cherkashchenko (2024–2025)

=== Former coaches ===
| Seasons | Coach | Country |
|---|---|---|
| 2013–2015 | Patrik Liljestrand | (Sweden) |
| 2015–2016 | Mariusz Jurasik | (Poland) |
| 2016 | Marek Kąpa | (Poland) |
| 2016–2017 | Ryszard Skutnik | (Poland) |
| 2017–2019 | Rastislav Trtík | (Czech Republic) |
| 2019–2022 | Marcin Lijewski | (Poland) |
| 2022–2023 | Patrik Liljestrand | (Sweden) |
| 2023–2024 | Tomasz Strząbała | (Poland) |
| 2024– | Arkadiusz Miszka | (Poland) |
