= Marek Daćko =

Polish handball player (born 1991)

Personal information
- Nationality: Polish
- Born: 29 March 1991 (age 35) Bartoszyce, Poland
- Height: 1.98 m (6 ft 6 in)

Sport
- Sport: Handball
- Position: Pivot
- Current club: NMC Górnik Zabrze
- Number: 5

Senior clubs
- Years: Team
- 2007–2010: SMS Gdańsk
- 2010–2011: BKS Bochnia
- 2011–2014: Piotrkowianin Piotrków Trybunalski
- 2014–: NMC Górnik Zabrze
National team
Years	Team	Apps	(Gls)
2013–	Poland	27	(34)

Marek Daćko (born 29 March 1991) is a Polish handball player for NMC Górnik Zabrze and the Polish national team.

He participated at the 2017 World Men's Handball Championship.
