= Michał Chodara =

Polish handball player (born 1986)

Personal information
- Nationality: Polish
- Born: 17 March 1986 (age 40) Biłgoraj, Poland
- Height: 1.81 m (5 ft 11 in)

Sport
- Sport: Handball
- Position: Centre back
- Current club: SPR Stal Mielec
- Number: 24

Youth career
- Years: Team
- –2005: MKS Biłgoraj

Senior clubs
- Years: Team
- 2005–2009: Vive Kielce
- 2009–2010: NMC Górnik Zabrze
- 2010–2018: SPR Stal Mielec
- 2018–2019: SPR Tarnów
- 2019–: SPR Stal Mielec
National team
Years	Team	Apps	(Gls)
2012–	Poland	4	(5)

Michał Chodara (born 17 March 1986) is a Polish handball player for SPR Stal Mielec and the Polish national team.

He participated at the 2013 World Men's Handball Championship.
