= Rafał Gliński =

Polish handball player (born 1982)

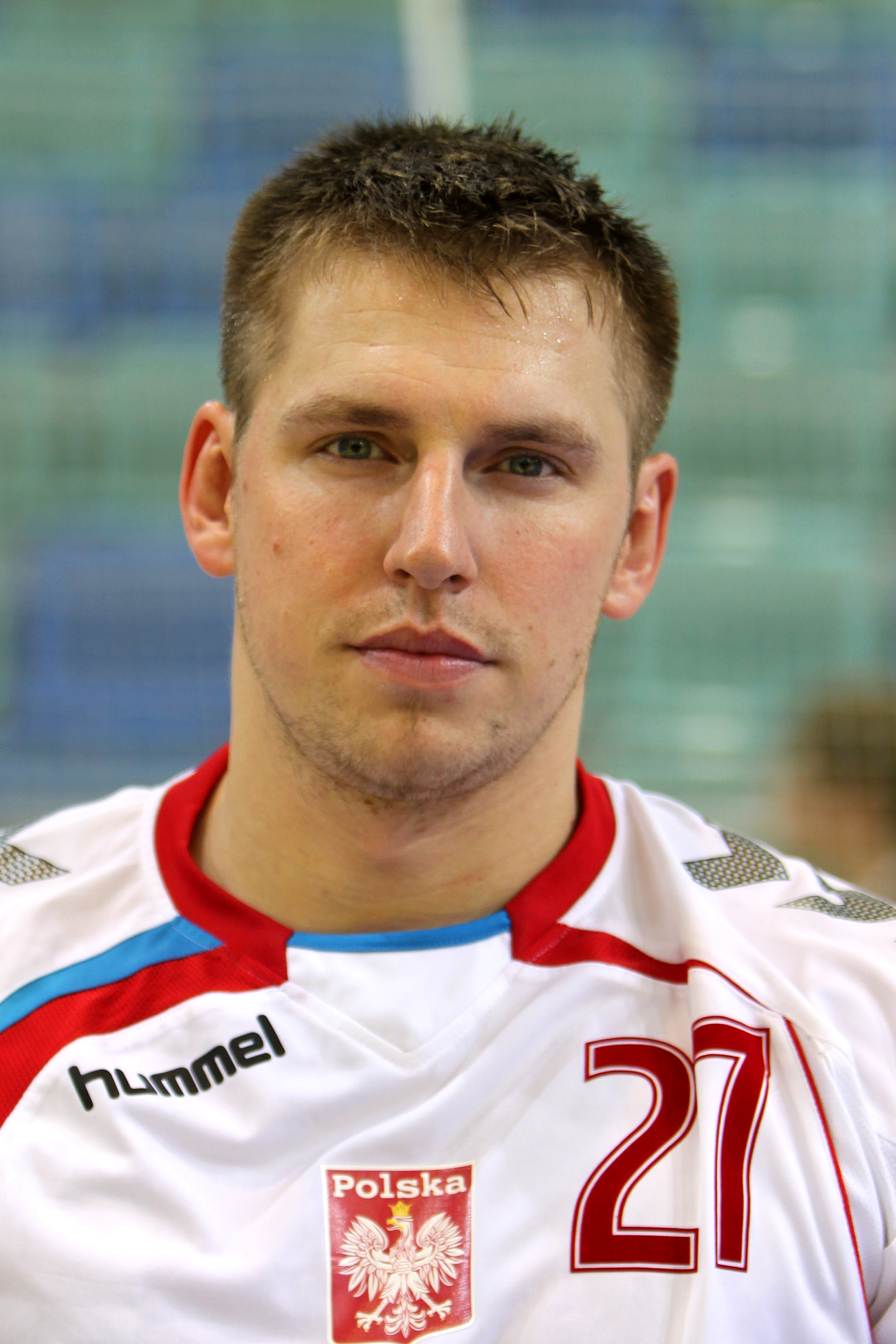

Personal information
- Nationality: Polish
- Born: 29 December 1982 (age 43) Wrocław, Poland
- Height: 1.83 m (6 ft 0 in)

Sport
- Sport: Handball
- Position: Centre back
- Current club: NMC Górnik Zabrze
- Number: 19

Senior clubs
- Years: Team
- 2001–2006: Śląsk Wrocław
- 2006–2009: TV Willstätt
- 2009–2011: Vive Kielce
- 2011–2015: SPR Stal Mielec
- 2015–: NMC Górnik Zabrze
National team
Years	Team	Apps	(Gls)
2008–2018	Poland	44	(42)
Medal record
World Championship
Bronze medal – third place	2009 Croatia

Rafał Gliński (born 29 December 1982) is a Polish handball player for NMC Górnik Zabrze.

He participated at the 2016 European Men's Handball Championship.
