= Krystian Bondzior =

Polish handball player (born 1999)

Personal information
- Nationality: Polish
- Born: 24 April 1999 (age 27) Lubin, Poland
- Height: 1.82 m (6 ft 0 in)

Sport
- Sport: Handball
- Position: Right wing
- Current club: NMC Górnik Zabrze
- Number: 4

Senior clubs
- Years: Team
- 2016–2019: Zagłębie Lubin
- 2019–: NMC Górnik Zabrze
National team
Years	Team	Apps	(Gls)
2019–	Poland	9	(5)

Krystian Bondzior (born 24 April 1999) is a Polish handball player for NMC Górnik Zabrze and the Polish national team.

He represented Poland at the 2020 European Men's Handball Championship.
