= Krzysztof Komarzewski =

Polish handball player (born 1998)

Personal information
- Nationality: Polish
- Born: 16 September 1998 (age 28) Gdańsk, Poland
- Height: 1.90 m (6 ft 3 in)

Sport
- Sport: Handball
- Position: Right wing

Youth career
- Years: Team
- –: Conrad Gdańsk
- –2016: Wybrzeże Gdańsk

Senior clubs
- Years: Team
- 2016–2017: SMS Gdańsk
- 2017–2019: Wybrzeże Gdańsk
- 2020–2023: Wisła Płock
- 2023: AEK Athens
National team
| Years | Team | Apps | (Gls) |
| 2018– | Poland | 4 | (10) |

Krzysztof Komarzewski (born 16 September 1998) is a Polish handball player who is a free agent. Lastly, he played for AEK Athens. He also plays for the Polish national team.

== Career ==
=== National team ===
He made his debut for the national team on 3 January 2019 in a friendly match against Belarus (28:30). He threw his first five goals on 5 January 2019 in a match against Saudi Arabia (28:19).
