= Jakub Szyszko =

Polish handball player (born 2001)

Personal information
- Nationality: Polish
- Born: 18 February 2001 (age 25) Bielsk Podlaski, Poland
- Height: 1.79 m (5 ft 10 in)

Sport
- Sport: Handball
- Position: Right wing
- Current club: Górnik Zabrze
- Number: 3

Youth career
- Years: Team
- –2018: TS Siemiatycze
- 2018–2020: Olimpia Biała Podlaska

Senior clubs
- Years: Team
- 2020–2023: MMTS Kwidzyn
- 2023–2025: Górnik Zabrze
- 2025–: Wisła Płock
National team
Years	Team	Apps	(Gls)
2025–	Poland	13	(29)
- Updated on 5 January 2025

Jakub Szyszko (born 18 February 2001) is a Polish handball player for Wisła Płock and the Polish national team.

He joined Polish Champions Wisła in 2025 after moving from Górnik Zabrze. At Górnik he won the bronze medal in the domestic league and appeared in the EHF European League.
