= AZS-AWFiS Gdańsk (handball) =

Polish handball club

AZS AWFiS Gdańsk
- Full name: Akademicki Związek Sportowy Akademia Wychowania Fizycznego i Sportu Gdańsk
- Dissolved: July 2010; 14 years ago
- Arena: Hala Widowiskowo-Sportowa AWFiS
- Capacity: 1,531
- League: Superliga
- 2009–10: 11th of 12 (Relegated)
- Club colours

AZS AWFiS Gdańsk were a men's handball club from Gdańsk, Poland. AZS AWFiS spent six seasons in the Superliga, Poland's highest league, before being dissolved in 2010.

== History ==
AZS AWFiS Gdańsk were the handball section of the Academy of Physical Education and Sport Jędrzej Śniadeckiego in Gdańsk, eventually becoming professional and rising through the leagues. AZS AWFiS first played in the Superliga for the 2003–04 season, eventually going on to finish 8th. After 9th and 10th finishes in the following seasons, AZS AWFiS were immediately promoted to the top division and spent a further 3 seasons in the Superliga. The club's greatest success was in the 2008–09 season when the club achieved a 6th place finish, and the first time they had finished in the top half of the table. However, their success was short-lived, and the following season the club finished 11th and were relegated. With the club and players being unable to reach agreements on wages the board members decided to dissolve the club.

== Honours ==
Superliga: 6th place; 2008–09 (highest finish)

Polish Cup: Quarterfinal; 2008–09 (highest result)

== Superliga seasons ==
Season	League	Position	Matches	Points	W	D	L	GF	GA	GD
2003–04	Superliga	8 of 12	32	32	14	4	14	873	866	+7
2004–05	Superliga	9 of 12	22	14	6	2	14	585	600	-15
2005–06	Superliga	10 of 12	22	12	5	2	15	563	644	-89
2007–08	Superliga	10 of 12	22	15	7	1	14	614	660	-46
2008–09	Superliga	6 of 12	22	21	10	1	11	613	604	+9
2009–10	Superliga	11 of 12	22	14	7	0	15	571	612	-41
