= Dmytro Ilchenko =

Ukrainian handball player

Personal information
- Nationality: Ukrainian
- Born: 9 July 1996 (age 30) Kyiv, Ukraine
- Height: 1.98 m (6 ft 6 in)

Sport
- Sport: Handball
- Position: Pivot
- Current club: Górnik Zabrze (handball)
- Number: 77
National team
Years	Team	Apps	(Gls)
–	Ukraine	18	(34)

Dmytro Ilchenko (Ukrainian: Дмитро Віталійович Ільченко; born 9 July 1996) is a Ukrainian handball player for Górnik Zabrze (handball) and the Ukrainian national team.

He represented Ukraine at the 2020 European Men's Handball Championship.
