= Poland men's national handball team =

Represents Poland at international handball competitions

Poland

Information
- Nickname: The White and Reds; The Gladiators
- Association: Polish Handball Association
- Coach: Jota González
- Assistant coach: Julen Aguinagalde; Zygmunt Kamys; Marcin Wichary
- Most caps: Sławomir Szmal (298)
- Most goals: Jerzy Klempel (1170)

Colours
1st	2nd

Results

Summer Olympics
- Appearances: 5 (First in 1972)
- Best result: (bronze) 3rd (1976)

World Championship
- Appearances: 18 (First in 1958)
- Best result: (silver) 2nd (2007)

European Championship
- Appearances: 11 (First in 2002)
- Best result: 4th (2010)
- Last updated on Unknown.

Poland men's national handball team
Medal record

Olympic Games
Bronze medal – third place	1976 Montreal	

World Championship
Silver medal – second place	2007 Germany	
Bronze medal – third place	1982 West Germany	
Bronze medal – third place	2009 Croatia	
Bronze medal – third place	2015 Qatar	

The Poland men's national handball team is controlled by the Polish Handball Association (Związek Piłki Ręcznej w Polsce), and represents Poland in international matches.

== History ==
Some of the team`s greatest achievements came between 2007 and 2016. At that time, legends like Sławomir Szmal, Karol Bielecki, or Marcin Lijewski led the Polish goldem generation to multiple world championship medals. It is also in this period that Polands best result, a silver medal at the 2007 World Championship, happened.

== Honours ==
Competition	1st place, gold medalist(s)	2nd place, silver medalist(s)	3rd place, bronze medalist(s)	Total
Olympic Games	0	0	1	1
World Championship	0	1	3	4
European Championship	0	0	0	0
Total	0	1	4	5

== Competitive record ==
=== Olympic Games ===
Year	Round	Position	GP	W	D	L	GF	GA
(Germany) 1936 Berlin	did not participate							
(West Germany) 1972 Munich	9th–12th places	10th	5	2	1	2	75	78
(Canada) 1976 Montreal	Final Round	3rd	5	4	0	1	101	89
(Soviet Union) 1980 Moscow	Final Round	7th	6	3	1	2	146	119
(United States) 1984 Los Angeles	Boycott							
(South Korea) 1988 Seoul	did not qualify							
(Spain) 1992 Barcelona	did not qualify							
(United States) 1996 Atlanta	did not qualify							
(Australia) 2000 Sydney	did not qualify							
(Greece) 2004 Athens	did not qualify							
(China) 2008 Beijing	Quarterfinals	5th	8	5	1	2	235	214
(United Kingdom) 2012 London	did not qualify							
(Brazil) 2016 Rio de Janeiro	Semifinals	4th	8	3	0	5	222	227
(Japan) 2020 Tokyo	did not qualify							
(France) 2024 Paris	did not qualify							
(United States) 2028 Los Angeles	to be determined							
(Australia) 2032 Brisbane	to be determined							
Total	5/14	0 Titles	32	17	3	12	779	727

=== World Championship ===
World Championship record
Year	Round	Position	GP	W	D	L	GF	GA
(Nazi Germany) 1938	did not enter							
(Sweden) 1954	did not enter							
(East Germany) 1958	5th/6th place	5	6	3	1	2	97	91
(West Germany) 1961	did not enter							
(Czechoslovakia) 1964	did not enter							
(Sweden) 1967	Preliminary round	12	3	1	0	2	53	66
(France) 1970	Preliminary round	14	3	0	0	3	43	59
(East Germany) 1974	Fourth place	4	6	4	0	2	104	86
(Denmark) 1978	5th/6th place	6	6	3	0	3	134	124
(West Germany) 1982	Third place	3	7	4	1	2	148	143
(Switzerland) 1986	Preliminary round	14	6	2	1	3	134	128
(Czechoslovakia) 1990	11th/12th place	11	7	3	0	4	160	177
(Sweden) 1993	did not qualify							
(Iceland) 1995	did not qualify							
(Japan) 1997	did not qualify							
(Egypt) 1999	did not qualify							
(France) 2001	did not qualify							
(Portugal) 2003	Second round	10	7	4	0	3	204	189
(Tunisia) 2005	did not qualify							
(Germany) 2007	Runners-up	2	10	8	0	2	310	274
(Croatia) 2009	Third place	3	10	7	0	3	298	264
(Sweden) 2011	7th/8th place	8	9	5	0	4	249	236
(Spain) 2013	Round of 16	9	6	4	0	2	153	137
(Qatar) 2015	Third place	3	9	6	0	3	241	222
(France) 2017	Presidents Cup	17	7	3	0	4	167	173
(Denmark) (Germany) 2019	did not qualify							
(Egypt) 2021	Main round	13	6	3	1	2	168	147
(Poland) (Sweden) 2023	Main round	15	6	3	0	3	150	151
(Croatia) (Denmark) (Norway) 2025	Presidents Cup	25	7	3	2	2	219	198
(Germany) 2027	qualified							
(France) (Germany) 2029	to be determined							
(Denmark) (Iceland) (Norway) 2031	to be determined							
Total	19/32	0 titles	121	66	6	49	3032	2865

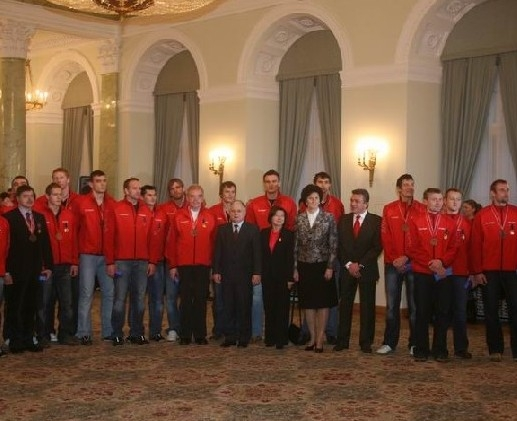
Former President of Poland, Lech Kaczyński, with the national team in the Presidential Palace in 2007

=== Euro Tournaments ===
All teams in these tournaments are European, all World and Olympic Champions, and top 7 from World Championships and Olympics were participating. They were mini European championships at the time.

EURO World Cup tournament Sweden

- 1974 (Sweden) : 2nd place
- 1979 (Sweden) : 2nd place
- 1984 (Sweden) : 5th place

=== European Championship ===
==== Competitive record at the European Championship ====
Year	Round	Position	GP	W	D	L	GF	GA
(Portugal) 1994	did not qualify							
(Spain) 1996	did not qualify							
(Italy) 1998	did not qualify							
(Croatia) 2000	did not qualify							
(Sweden) 2002	Preliminary round	15	3	0	0	3	67	83
(Slovenia) 2004	Preliminary round	16	3	0	0	3	86	108
(Switzerland) 2006	Main round	10	6	1	1	4	163	185
(Norway) 2008	Main round	7	6	3	1	2	182	172
(Austria) 2010	Fourth place	4	8	4	1	3	222	221
(Serbia) 2012	Main round	9	6	3	1	2	173	160
(Denmark) 2014	Main round	6	7	3	0	4	191	184
(Poland) 2016	Seventh place	7	7	5	0	2	193	194
(Croatia) 2018	did not qualify							
(Austria) (Norway) (Sweden) 2020	Preliminary round	21	3	0	0	3	73	85
(Hungary) (Slovakia) 2022	Main round	12	7	2	1	4	193	208
(Germany) 2024	Preliminary round	16	3	1	0	2	78	92
(Denmark) (Norway) (Sweden) 2026	Preliminary round	21	3	0	0	3	72	89
(Portugal) (Spain) (Switzerland) 2028	To be determined							
(Czech Republic) (Denmark) (Poland) 2030	Qualified as co-host							
(France) (Germany) 2032	To be determined							
Total	12/20	0 titles	62	22	5	35	1693	1781

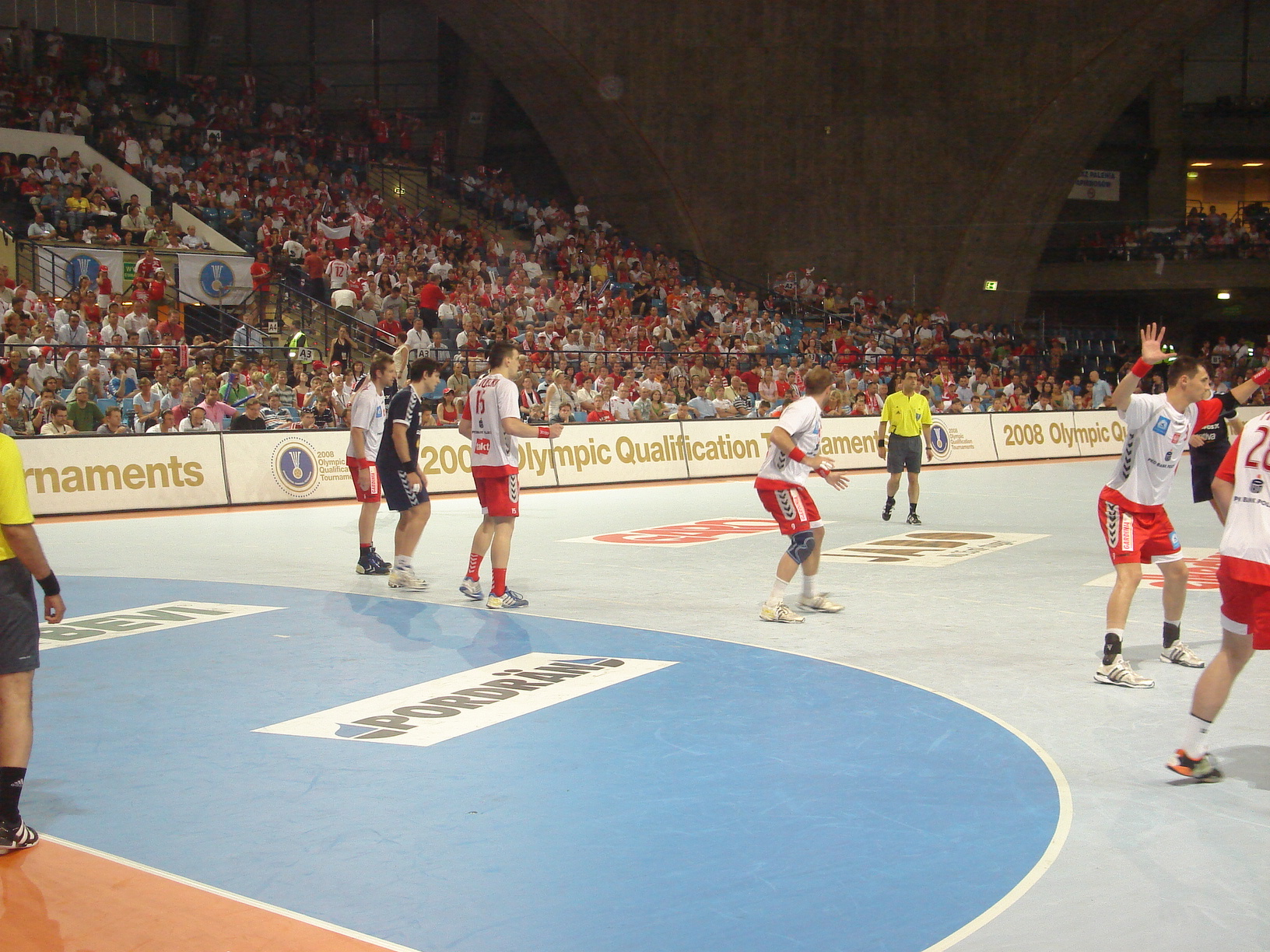
Poland against Argentina during 2008 Summer Olympics qualification tournament in the Centennial Hall, Wrocław

==== Competitive record in qualifying rounds ====
Year	GP	W	D	L	GF	GA	Qual
(Portugal) 1994	10	6	1	3	269	211	no
(Spain) 1996	6	0	0	6	140	175	no
(Italy) 1998	12	5	0	7	290	296	no
(Croatia) 2000	8	5	0	3	206	189	no
(Sweden) 2002	2	1	1	0	56	52	yes
(Slovenia) 2004	2	1	0	1	60	49	yes
(Switzerland) 2006	5	3	0	2	163	129	yes
(Norway) 2008	2	2	0	0	72	47	yes
(Austria) 2010	8	5	1	2	242	198	yes
(Serbia) 2012	6	4	1	1	172	147	yes
(Denmark) 2014	6	5	0	1	162	133	yes
(Poland) 2016	Qualified as host						yes
(Croatia) 2018	6	1	2	3	171	189	no
(Austria) (Norway) (Sweden) 2020	6	2	1	3	152	139	yes
(Hungary) (Slovakia) 2022	6	3	0	3	176	165	yes
(Germany) 2024	6	4	0	2	184	153	yes
(Denmark) (Norway) (Sweden) 2026	6	2	2	2	184	190	yes
(Portugal) (Spain) (Switzerland) 2028	To be determined						
(Czech Republic) (Denmark) (Poland) 2030	Qualified as co-host						yes
(France) (Germany) 2032	To be determined						
Total	97	49	9	39	2699	2462	12/17

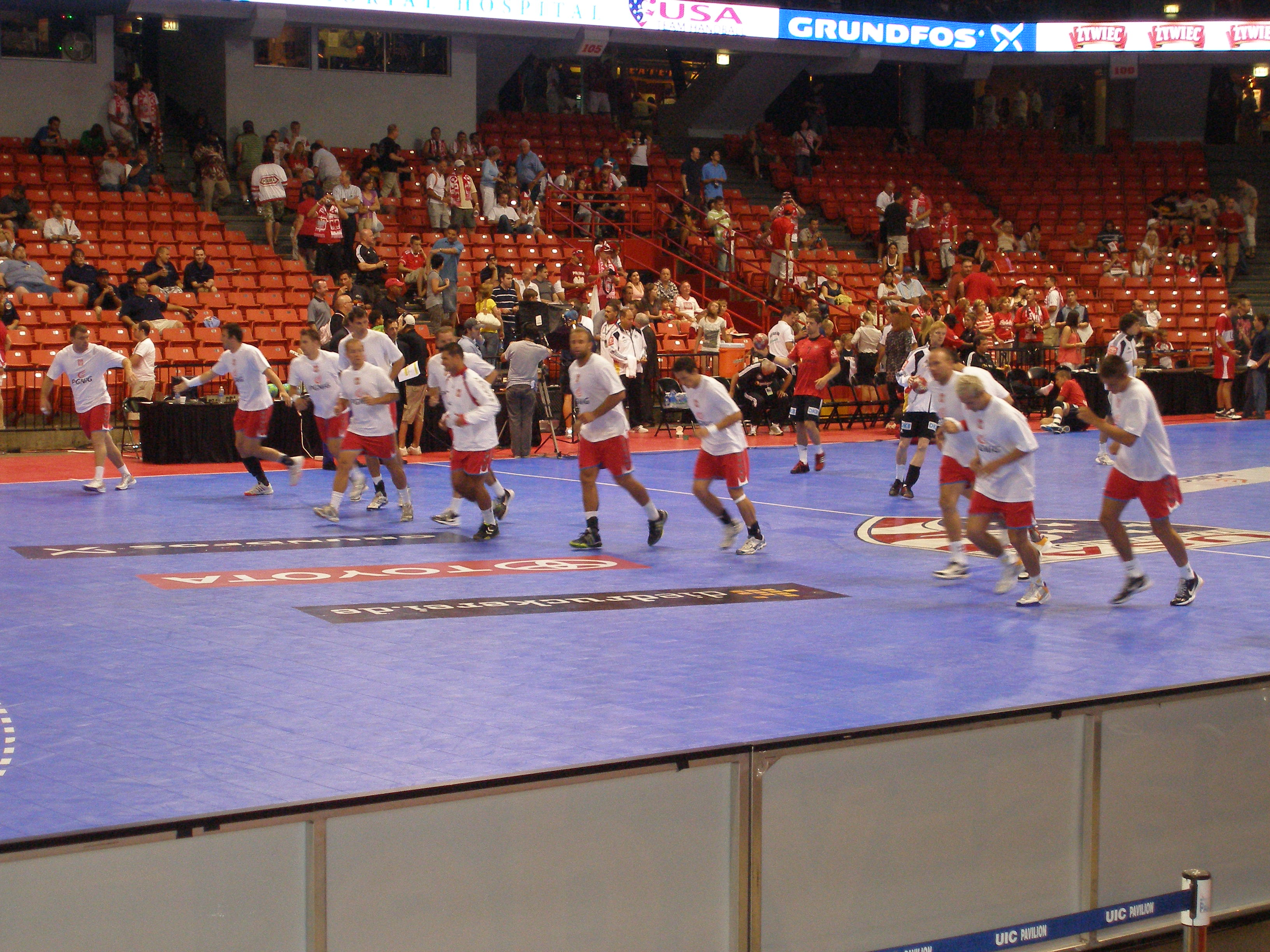
Warm up of the national team before match against Germany in 2010

=== Other tournaments ===
- Supercup Winner: 2007

== Team ==
=== Current squad ===
Squad for the 2026 European Men's Handball Championship.

Head coach: Jota González

No.	Pos.	Name	Date of birth (age)	Height	App.	Goals	Club
1	GK	Miłosz Wałach	23 November 2001 (age 24)	1.95 m	4	0	(North Macedonia) RK Vardar 1961
2	LB	Damian Przytuła	27 November 1998 (age 27)	2.00 m	58	122	(Croatia) RK Zagreb
3	RB	Michał Daszek	27 June 1992 (age 34)	1.82 m	155	398	(Poland) Orlen Wisła Płock
4	CB	Piotr Jędraszczyk	9 October 2001 (age 24)	1.80 m	50	119	(Poland) Industria Kielce
5	CB	Michał Olejniczak	31 January 2001 (age 25)	1.95 m	82	154	(Poland) Industria Kielce
12	LB	Ariel Pietrasik	21 October 1999 (age 26)	2.02 m	55	116	(Switzerland) Kadetten Schaffhausen
17	RB	Andrzej Widomski	6 February 2003 (age 23)	1.90 m	14	28	(North Macedonia) RK Eurofarm Pelister
23	RW	Arkadiusz Moryto	31 August 1997 (age 28)	1.82 m	108	510	(Poland) Industria Kielce
25	LW	Piotr Jarosiewicz	28 June 1998 (age 28)	1.80 m	30	41	(Poland) Industria Kielce
26	RW	Marek Marciniak	21 September 1995 (age 30)	1.88 m	13	24	(North Macedonia) RK Vardar 1961
28	P	Maciej Gębala	10 January 1994 (age 32)	2.00 m	116	151	(Germany) HC Erlangen
30	RB	Wiktor Tomczak	22 July 2002 (age 24)	2.00 m	6	2	(Poland) PGE Wybrzeże Gdańsk
35	CB	Paweł Paterek	17 December 2000 (age 25)	1.86 m	31	66	(Poland) KGHM Chrobry Głogów
36	P	Dawid Dawydzik	7 December 1994 (age 31)	2.00 m	57	75	(Poland) Orlen Wisła Płock
38	P	Sebastian Kaczor	15 December 2001 (age 24)	1.96 m	3	4	(France) USAM Nîmes Gard
44	LW	Mikołaj Czapliński	11 August 2000 (age 25)	1.88 m	34	86	(Poland) PGE Wybrzeże Gdańsk
48	LB	Tomasz Gębala	23 November 1995 (age 30)	2.12 m	49	135	(Poland) PGE Wybrzeże Gdańsk
50	GK	Jakub Skrzyniarz	6 June 1996 (age 30)	1.89 m	29	0	(Spain) Irudek Bidasoa Irún
78	P	Wiktor Jankowski	12 October 2001 (age 24)	2.00 m	5	2	(North Macedonia) RK Vardar 1961

=== Head coaches ===
- Ignacy Pazur
- Walenty Kłyszejko
- 1956–1967 – Tadeusz Breguła
- 1967–1976 – Janusz Czerwiński
- 1976–1978 – Stanisław Majorek
- 1978–1980 – Jacek Zglinicki
- Tadeusz Wadych
- Jan Pełka
- 1981–1984 – Zygfryd Kuchta
- Jerzy Eliasz
- 1986–1990 – Zenon Łakomy
- 1990–1992 – Michał Kaniowski
- 1992–1994 – Bogdan Kowalczyk
- 1994–1996 – Jacek Zglinicki
- Stefan Wrześniewski
- Jerzy Klempel
- 1998–2000 – Zygfryd Kuchta
- 2000–2004 – Bogdan Zajączkowski
- 2004–2012 – Bogdan Wenta
- 2012–2016 – Michael Biegler
- 2016–2017 – Talant Dujshebaev
- 2017–2019 – Piotr Przybecki
- 2019–2023 – Patryk Rombel
- 2023–2025 – Marcin Lijewski
- 2025– Jota González

=== Statistics ===
Matches include data obtained exclusively in official international matches of the Polish national team. All unofficial matches of the national team, or meetings in the frame other than the national team – played by a player – are not included in the following lists.

=== Most caps ===
#	Player	Years	Caps
1.	Sławomir Szmal	1998–2018	298
2.	Karol Bielecki	2002–2017	259
3.	Marcin Lijewski	1997–2013	251
4.	Bartosz Jurecki	2004–2016	237
5.	Andrzej Szymczak	1967–1984	234
6.	Jerzy Klempel	1972–1984	221
7.	Daniel Waszkiewicz	1977–1989	214
8.	Mariusz Jurasik	1997–2012	207
9.	Alfred Kałuziński	1973–1982	204
10.	Patryk Kuchczyński	2002–2014	201
11.	Michał Jurecki	2005–2017	198
12.	Bogdan Wenta	1981–1994	191
13.	Zbigniew Tłuczyński	1978–1990	186
14.	Krzysztof Lijewski	2003–2017	185
15.	Kamil Syprzak	2011–	180
16.	Zbigniew Plechoć	1983–1990	178
17.	Henryk Rozmiarek	1971–1980	177
18.	Jan Gmyrek	1970–1979	176
19.	Damian Wleklak	1998–2009	164
20.	Mariusz Jurkiewicz	2002–2017	163

=== Most goals ===
#	Player	Years	Goals
1.	Jerzy Klempel	1972–1984	1170
2.	Karol Bielecki	2002–2017	962
3.	Bogdan Wenta	1981–1994	763
4.	Bartosz Jurecki	2004–2016	732
5.	Marcin Lijewski	1997–2013	711
6.	Robert Nowakowski	1989–2003	709
7.	Daniel Waszkiewicz	1977–1989	705
8.	Mariusz Jurasik	1997–2012	704
9.	Alfred Kałuziński	1973–1982	620
10.	Grzegorz Tkaczyk	2000–2012	549
11.	Michał Jurecki	2005–2017	547
12.	Zbigniew Tłuczyński	1978–1990	527
13.	Arkadiusz Moryto	2017–	510
14.	Tomasz Tłuczyński	2006–2012	503
15.	Lesław Dziuba	1981–1990	447
16.	Krzysztof Lijewski	2003–2017	439
17.	Patryk Kuchczyński	2002–2014	435
18.	Zbigniew Plechoć	1983–1990	427
19.	Kamil Syprzak	2011–	417
20.	Michał Daszek	2013–	386

== Kit suppliers ==
The Polish national kit is supplied by Joma.

== Media Coverage ==
Poland's matches are currently televised by TVP Sport and Eurosport.
