= Lijewski =

Lijewski is a Polish surname. Notable people with the surname include:

- Christy Lijewski (born 1981), American comic book artist and illustrator
- Krzysztof Lijewski (born 1983), Polish handball player
- Marcin Lijewski (born 1977), Polish handball player
