= Andrzej Kraśnicki =

Polish sports administrator (1949–2025)

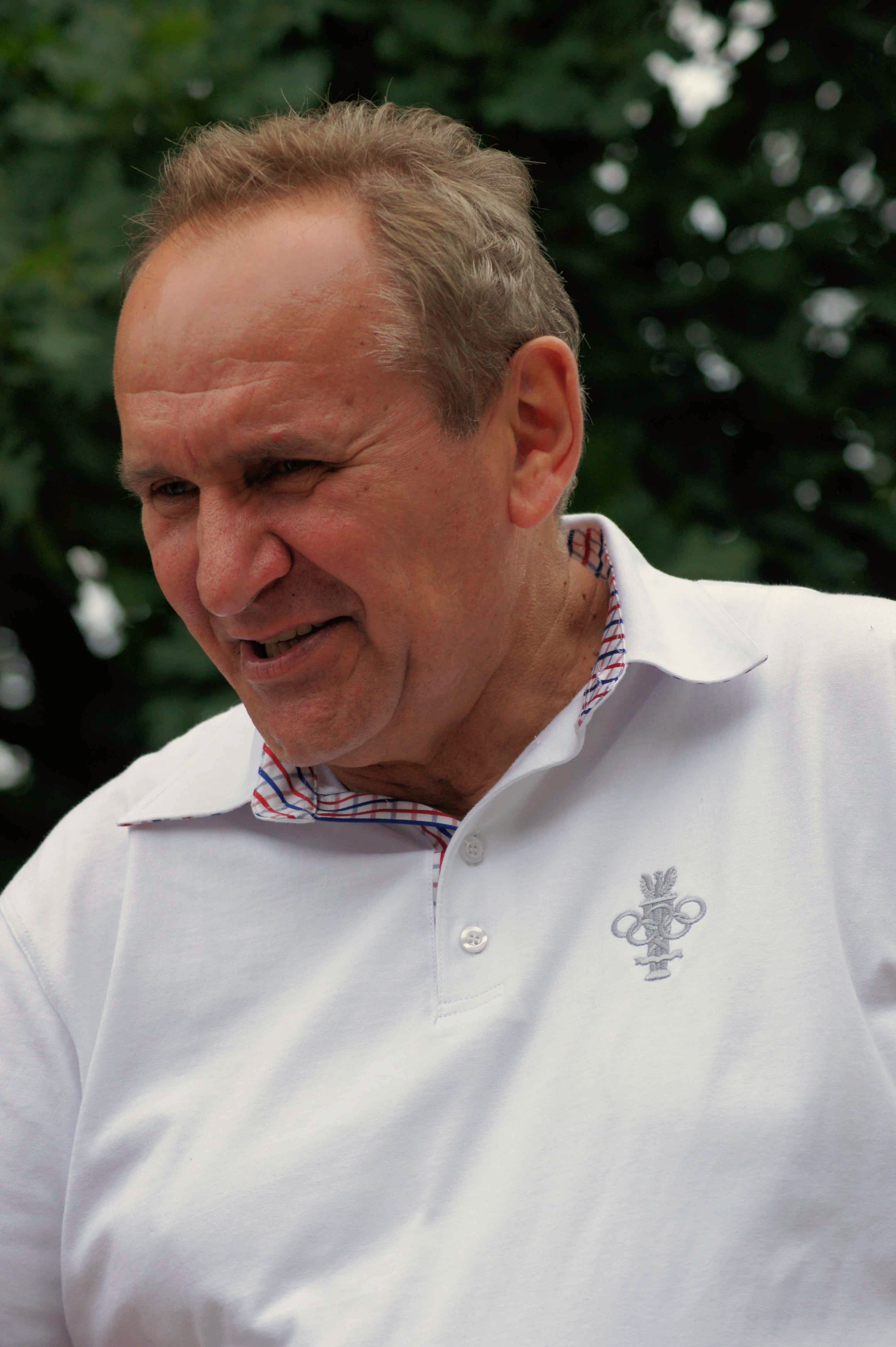
- Kraśnicki in 2011
- Born: Andrzej Piotr Kraśnicki; 31 January 1949; Nidzica, Poland
- Died: 10 January 2025 (aged 75)
- Occupation: Sports administrator

Andrzej Piotr Kraśnicki (31 January 1949 – 10 January 2025) was a Polish sports administrator. He was president of the Polish Handball Association from 2006 to 2021. From 2010 to 2023 he served as president of the Polish Olympic Committee.

== Early life ==
Kraśnicki was born in Nidzica, Poland on 31 January 1949.

== Career ==
Kraśnicki was president of the Polish Handball Association from 2006 to 2021. While he was president, the Polish team medaled three times in the IHF World Men's Handball Championships, in 2007, 2009, and 2015. He resigned in February 2021.

After Piotr Nurowski's death on 20 April 2010, he began serving as president of the Polish Olympic Committee. He served until 22 April 2023, resigning a month before the election that he decided not to run in. He became an honorary professor of Collegium Humanum – Warsaw Management University in 2020.

== Death ==
Kraśnicki died on 10 January 2025, at the age of 75.

== Awards ==
Kraśnicki was a recipient of the Order of Polonia Restituta (2024).
