= Polish Olympic Committee =

National Olympic committee of Poland

- Country: Poland
- Code: POL
- Created: 12 October 1919
- Recognized: 1919
- Continental Association: EOC
- Headquarters: Warsaw
- President: Marian Kmita (acting)
- Secretary General: Marek Pałus
- Website: olimpijski.pl

The Polish Olympic Committee (Polish: Polski Komitet Olimpijski, official acronym PKOl; IOC Code: POL) is the National Olympic Committee representing Poland.

== History ==
The Polish Olympic Committee was established on 12 October 1919 and was recognised by the International Olympic Committee the same year. Poland first participated in the Olympic Games in 1924, and attended every Summer Games through 1980. Poland boycotted the 1984 Summer Olympics in Los Angeles and returned for the 1988 Summer Olympics in Seoul. Poland has also attended every Winter Olympics since 1924. In 1969, the Polish Olympic Committee was awarded the Olympic Cup.

In 2026, Polish Olympic Committee President Radosław Piesiewicz was arrested for allegedly accepting bribes to sign a sponsorship agreement with Zondacrypto, a defunct cryptocurrency exchange and Ponzi scheme. Under the deal, Polish medalists at the 2026 Winter Olympics were to have been paid bonuses in cryptocurrency, although Zondacrypto did not follow through with all of the payments. According to media reports, Piesiewicz received a watch worth €40,000 from the president of Zondacrypto, Przemyslaw Kral, although Piesiewicz stated that he bought the watch himself. The Polish Olympic Committee met on September 8, 2026, and removed him from his position.

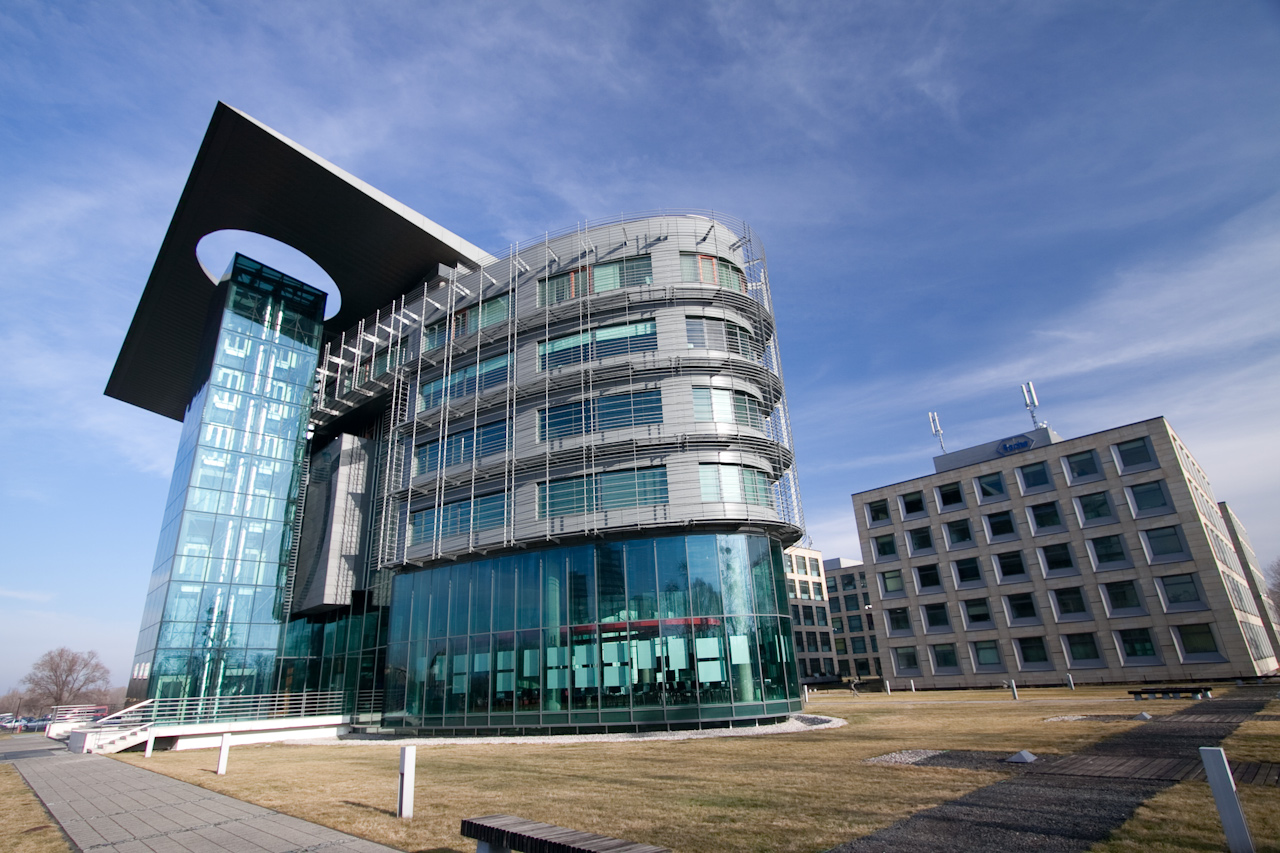
Olympic Center in Warsaw

== List of presidents ==
President	Term
Stefan Lubomirski	1919–1921
Kazimierz Lubomirski	1921–1929
Kazimierz Glabisz	1929–1945
Alfred Loth	1946–1952
Włodzimierz Reczek	1952–1973
Bolesław Kapitan	1973–1978
Marian Renke	1978–1986
Bolesław Kapitan	1986–1988
Aleksander Kwaśniewski	1988–1991
Andrzej Szalewicz	1991–1997
Stanisław Stefan Paszczyk	1997–2005
Piotr Nurowski	2005–2010
Andrzej Kraśnicki	2010–2023
Radosław Piesiewicz	2023–2026
Marian Kmita (acting)	2026–

== Member federations ==
The Polish National Federations are the organizations that coordinate all aspects of their individual sports. They are responsible for training, competition and development of their sports. There are currently 29 Olympic Summer and 8 Winter Sport Federations in Poland.

National Federation	Summer or Winter	Headquarters
Polish Archery Federation	Summer	Warsaw
Polish Athletic Association	Summer	Warsaw
Polish Badminton Association	Summer	Warsaw
Polish Basketball Association	Summer	Warsaw
Polish Biathlon Association	Winter	Katowice
Polish Bobsleigh and Skeleton Federation	Winter	Gdańsk
Polish Boxing Association	Summer	Warsaw
Polish Canoe Federation	Summer	Warsaw
Polish Curling Association	Winter	Warsaw
Polish Cycling Federation	Summer	Pruszków
Polish Equestrian Federation	Summer	Warsaw
Polish Fencing Federation	Summer	Warsaw
Polish Figure Skating Association	Winter	Warsaw
Polish Football Association	Summer	Warsaw
Polish Golf Union	Summer	Warsaw
Polish Gymnastics Association	Summer	Warsaw
Polish Handball Federation	Summer	Warsaw
Polish Hockey Association	Summer	Poznań
Polish Ice Hockey Federation	Winter	Warsaw
Polish Judo Association	Summer	Warsaw
Polish Luge Federation	Winter	Warsaw
Polish Modern Pentathlon Association	Summer	Warsaw
Polish Rowing Association	Summer	Warsaw
Polish Rugby Union	Summer	Warsaw
Polish Ski Association	Winter	Kraków
Polish Sport Shooting Federation	Summer	Warsaw
Polish Speed Skating Association	Winter	Warsaw
Polish Swimming Federation	Summer	Warsaw
Polish Table Tennis Association	Summer	Warsaw
Polish Taekwondo Federation	Summer	Oleśnica
Polish Tennis Association	Summer	Warsaw
Polish Triathlon Union	Summer	Warsaw
Polish Volleyball Federation	Summer	Warsaw
Polish Weightlifting Federation	Summer	Warsaw
Polish Wrestling Federation	Summer	Warsaw
Polish Yachting Association	Summer	Warsaw

== See also ==
- Sport in Poland
- Poland at the Olympics
- Polish Paralympic Committee
