= PZG =

PZG or variant may refer to:

- Panzergrenadier (PzG), mechanized infantry, and infantry attached to armoured units
- Polish Golf Union (Polish: Polski Związek Golfa; PZG)
- Pashtun Tahafuz Movement
