= Radosław Piesiewicz =

Polish sports administrator (born 1981)

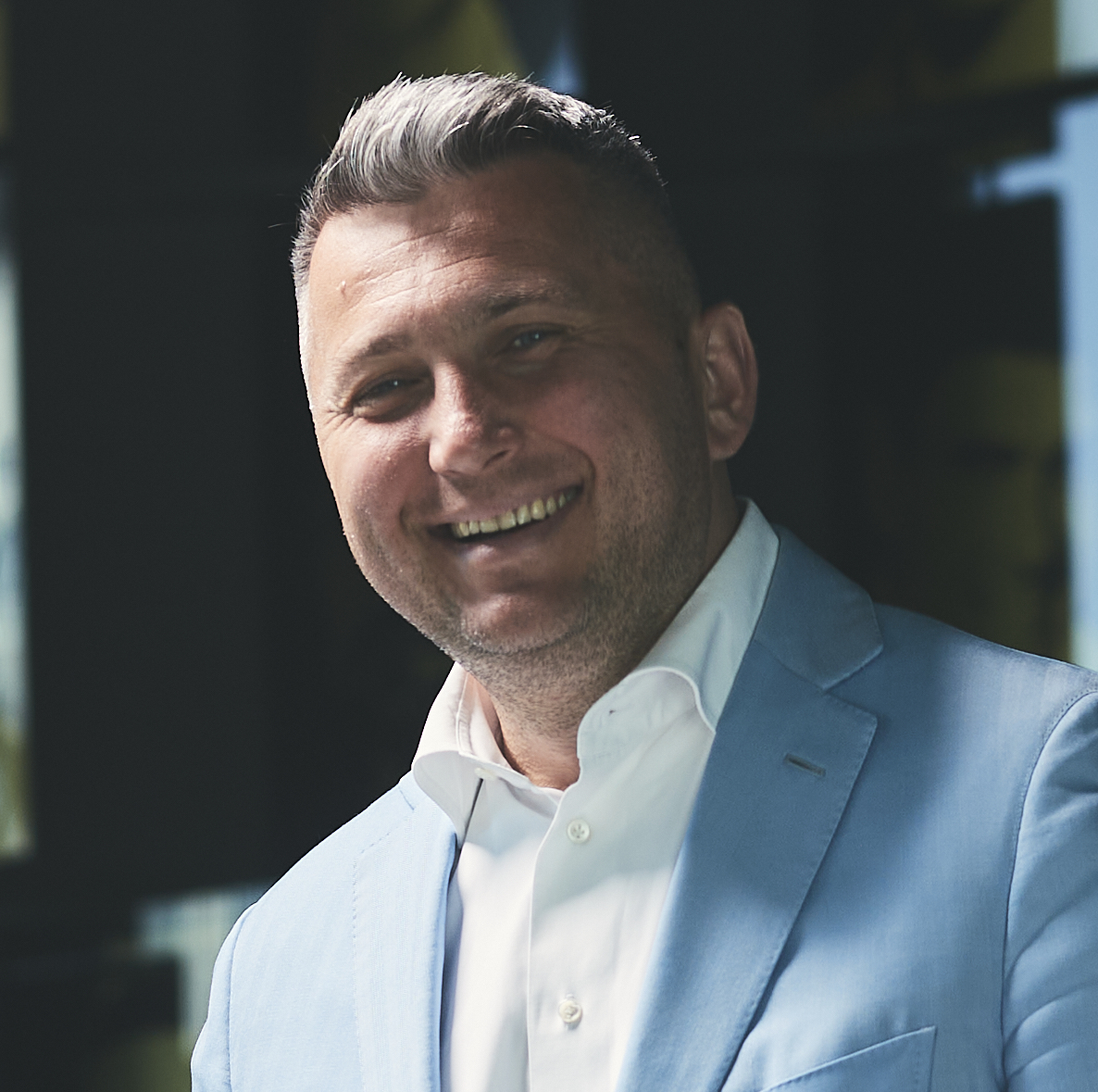
- Piesiewicz in 2023
- Born: 20 February 1981 (age 45)
- Education: University of Warsaw
- Title: President of the Polish Olympic Committee
- Term: 2023–2026

Radosław Piesiewicz (born 20 February 1981) is a Polish sports administrator who has served as the president of the Polish Olympic Committee from 2023 to 2026.

== Biography ==
Piesiewicz was born on 20 February 1981. He graduated from the University of Warsaw with a degree in Law and Administration, and completed postgraduate studies in project management and real estate management.

From 2016 to 2017, he served as the vice president of the Polish Volleyball Federation, where he was the head of sales and marketing. In 2018, he became president of the Polish Basketball Federation. He received 63 delegate votes while his opponent, Jacek Jakubowski, had 27. He ran again in 2022, this time unopposed, receiving the support of 79 out of 81 delegates in a secret ballot. In 2022, he became a business advisor for the Basketball Champions League run by FIBA Europe.

He was elected as head of the Polish Olympic Committee in 2023 with support from the far-right Law and Justice party. In 2026, he was arrested for allegedly accepting bribes to sign a sponsorship agreement with Zondacrypto, a defunct cryptocurrency exchange and Ponzi scheme. Under the deal, Polish medalists at the 2026 Winter Olympics were to have been paid bonuses in cryptocurrency, although Zondacrypto did not follow through with all of the payments. According to media reports, Piesiewicz received a watch worth €40,000 from the president of Zondacrypto, Przemysław Kral, although Piesiewicz stated that he bought the watch himself. The Polish Olympic Committee met on 8 September 2026, and removed him from his position.
