= Marcin Wichary =

Polish handball coach (born 1980)

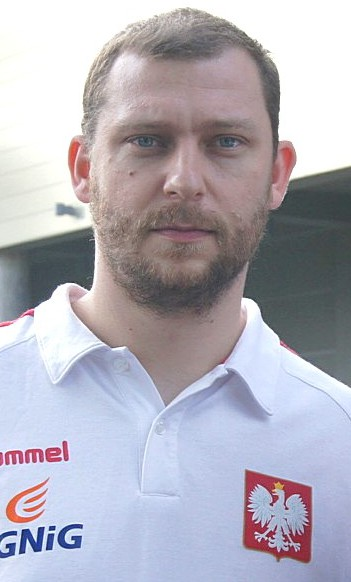

Personal information
- Nationality: Polish
- Born: 17 February 1980 (age 46) Zabrze, Poland
- Height: 1.93 m (6 ft 4 in)

Sport
- Sport: Handball
- Position: Goalkeeper
- Current club: Orlen Wisła Płock; Poland (GK coach)

Youth career
- Years: Team
- –1999: Sparta Zabrze

Senior clubs
- Years: Team
- 1999–2000: AZS AWF Biała Podlaska
- 2000–2004: KS Warszawianka
- 2004–2019: Orlen Wisła Płock
National team
Years	Team	Apps	(Gls)
2003–2016	Poland	112	(0)

Teams managed
- 2020–: Orlen Wisła Płock (GK coach)
- 2021–: Poland (GK coach)
Medal record
World Championship
Bronze medal – third place	2015 Qatar	Team

Marcin Wichary (born 17 February 1980) is a former Polish handball player and the current goalkeeper coach for Poland. As a player he received a bronze medal with the Polish team at the 2015 World Men's Handball Championship in Qatar. He participated at the 2008 Summer Olympics, where Poland finished 5th.

== Sporting achievements ==
=== State awards ===
- 2015 Silver Cross of Merit
