= Jurasik =

Jurasik is a surname. Notable people with the surname include:

- Peter Jurasik (born 1950), American actor
- Mariusz Jurasik (born 1976), Polish handball player
