= Albert Rocas =

Spanish handball player (born 1982)

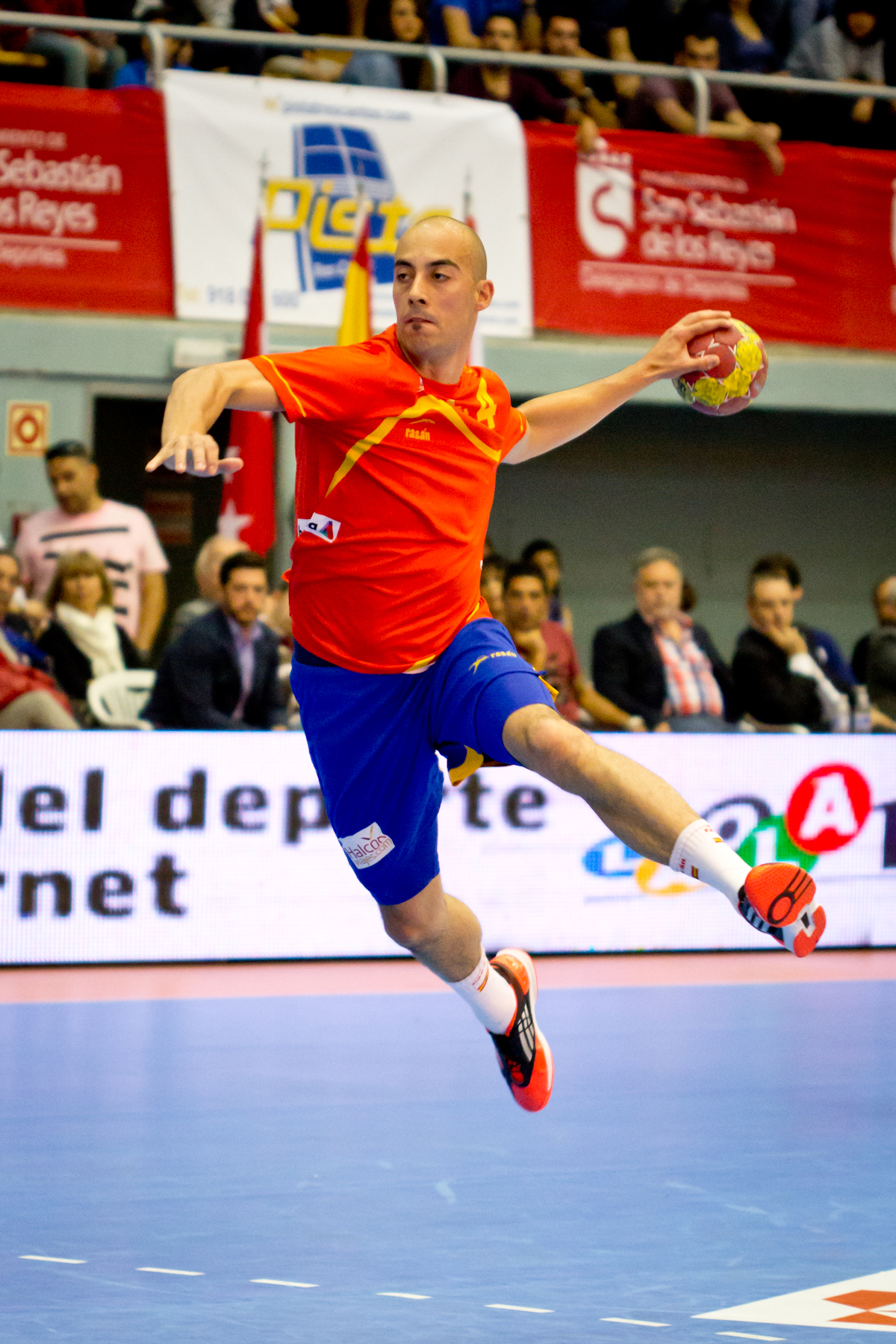
- Rocas in 2013

Personal information
- Full name: Albert Rocas Comas
- Born: 16 June 1982 (age 44) Palafrugell, Girona
- Height: 1.88 m (6 ft 2 in)

Sport
- Sport: Handball
- Position: Right wing
- Current club: Retired
- Number: 22

Senior clubs
- Years: Team
- 1997: CH Garbi
- 1997–2000: Granollers
- 2000–2003: Valladolid
- 2003–2007: Portland San Antonio
- 2007–2013: FC Barcelona
- 2013–2014: KIF Kolding København
- 2014–2018: CB Logroño
National team
Years	Team	Apps	(Gls)
2001–2015	Spain	162	(555)
Medal record
Olympic Games
Bronze medal – third place	2008 Beijing	Team
World Championships
Gold medal – first place	2005 Tunisia	Team
Gold medal – first place	2013 Spain	Team
Bronze medal – third place	2011 Sweden	Team
European Championships
Silver medal – second place	2006 Switzerland
Bronze medal – third place	2014 Denmark	Team
Mediterranean Games
Gold medal – first place	2005 Almería	Team

Albert Rocas Comas (Note: In this Spanish name, the first or paternal surname is Rocas and the second or maternal family name is Comas.) (born 16 June 1982) is a Spanish handball player. He is currently retired and is working in a Spanish school.

He participated at the 2008 Summer Olympics in Beijing as a member of the Spain men's national handball team. The team won a bronze medal, defeating Croatia. He was included as "Best right wing" in that tournament's All Star Team. At the 2013 World Men's Handball Championship, the national team became world champion for the second time.
