= Handball at the 2008 Summer Olympics – Men's tournament =

2008 Men's Olympic handball tournament
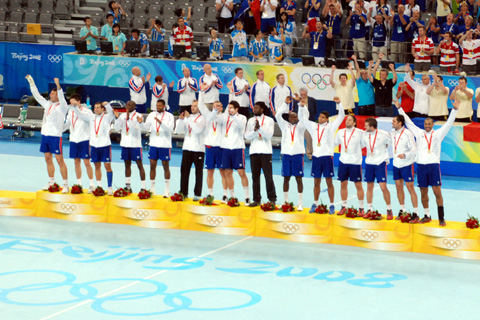
- Medal ceremony

Tournament details
- Host country: China
- Venue(s): 2 (in 1 host city)
- Dates: 9–24 August 2008
- Teams: 12 (from 4 confederations)

Final positions
- Champions: France (1st title)
- Runner-up: Iceland
- Third place: Spain
- Fourth place: Croatia

Tournament statistics
- Matches played: 42
- Goals scored: 2,294 (54.62 per match)
- Top scorer(s): Juan García (ESP) (49 goals)

The men's handball tournament at the 2008 Summer Olympics was held from August 10 to August 24, at the Olympic Sports Centre Gymnasium and National Indoor Stadium in Beijing. Twelve nations are represented in the men's tournament.

The four best teams from each group advanced to the quarterfinal round, 5th and 6th teams in each group are classified 9th-12th by the results of their group matches. The losers of quarterfinal matches competed in the 5th-8th place matches by the same elimination system as the winners of the quarterfinals.

This event was the last to be completed in the 2008 Summer Olympics.

== Qualification ==
Competition	Date	Venue	Vacancies	Qualified
Host Nation	-	-	1	China
IHF World Championships	Jan 19 - Feb 4, 2007	Germany	1	Germany
European Championships	January 17–27, 2008	Norway	1	Denmark
Asian Qualifying Tournament	January 30, 2008	(Japan) Tokyo	1	South Korea
African Championships	January 10–17, 2008	Angola	1	Egypt
Pan American Games	July 14–29, 2007	(Brazil) Rio de Janeiro	1	Brazil
Olympic Qualifying Tournament 1	May 30 - Jun 1, 2008	(Poland) Wrocław	2	Poland; Iceland
Olympic Qualifying Tournament 2	May 30 - Jun 1, 2008	(France) Paris	2	France; Spain
Olympic Qualifying Tournament 3	May 30 - Jun 1, 2008	(Croatia) Zadar	2	Croatia; Russia
TOTAL			12	

Olympic Qualifying Tournaments

- Tournament I:
  - Worlds 2nd: Poland
  - Worlds 8th: Iceland
  - Europe: Sweden
  - Pan-America: Argentina
- Tournament II:
  - Worlds 4th: France
  - Worlds 7th: Spain
  - Africa: Tunisia
  - Top continent at the Worlds (Europe): Norway
- Tournament III:
  - Worlds 5th: Croatia
  - Worlds 6th: Russia
  - Asia: Japan
  - 2nd continent at the Worlds (Africa): Algeria

== Preliminary round ==
=== Seeding ===
The draw for the groups was held 16 June 2008.

Pot 1	Pot 2	Pot 3	Pot 4	Pot 5	Pot 6
Germany	Denmark	Croatia	South Korea	Spain	Egypt
Poland	France	Russia	China	Iceland	Brazil

== Group stage ==
=== Group A ===
Team	Pld	W	D	L	GF	GA	GD	Pts	Qualification
France	5	4	1	0	148	115	+33	9	Qualified for the quarterfinals
Poland	5	3	1	1	147	128	+19	7	Qualified for the quarterfinals
Croatia	5	3	0	2	140	115	+25	6	Qualified for the quarterfinals
Spain	5	3	0	2	152	145	+7	6	Qualified for the quarterfinals
Brazil	5	1	0	4	129	153	−24	2	
China	5	0	0	5	104	164	−60	0	

10 August 2008; 09:00	Croatia	31 – 29	Spain	Olympic Sports Centre Gymnasium; Referees: Lemme, Ulrich (GER)
10 August 2008; 09:00	Lacković, Džomba 5	(16–11)	García 5	Olympic Sports Centre Gymnasium; Referees: Lemme, Ulrich (GER)
10 August 2008; 09:00	4× (yellow card) 4× (suspension)	Report	3× (yellow card) 3× (suspension)	Olympic Sports Centre Gymnasium; Referees: Lemme, Ulrich (GER)

10 August 2008; 14:00	France	34 – 26	Brazil	Olympic Sports Centre Gymnasium; Referees: Din, Dinu (ROU)
10 August 2008; 14:00	Girault 7	(19–11)	Ertel 5	Olympic Sports Centre Gymnasium; Referees: Din, Dinu (ROU)
10 August 2008; 14:00	3× (yellow card) 2× (suspension)	Report	3× (yellow card) 4× (suspension)	Olympic Sports Centre Gymnasium; Referees: Din, Dinu (ROU)

10 August 2008; 19:00	Poland	33 – 19	China	Olympic Sports Centre Gymnasium; Referees: Karbaschi, Kolahdouzan (IRI)
10 August 2008; 19:00	Jurasik 8	(21–10)	five players 3	Olympic Sports Centre Gymnasium; Referees: Karbaschi, Kolahdouzan (IRI)
10 August 2008; 19:00	3× (yellow card) 3× (suspension)	Report	3× (yellow card) 3× (suspension)	Olympic Sports Centre Gymnasium; Referees: Karbaschi, Kolahdouzan (IRI)

12 August 2008; 09:00	Brazil	14 – 33	Croatia	Olympic Sports Centre Gymnasium; Referees: Gjeding, Hansen (DEN)
12 August 2008; 09:00	Ertel, Souza 3	(9–18)	Džomba 7	Olympic Sports Centre Gymnasium; Referees: Gjeding, Hansen (DEN)
12 August 2008; 09:00	3× (yellow card) 4× (suspension)	Report	2× (yellow card) 3× (suspension)	Olympic Sports Centre Gymnasium; Referees: Gjeding, Hansen (DEN)

12 August 2008; 14:00	China	19 – 33	France	Olympic Sports Centre Gymnasium; Referees: Canbro, Claesson (SWE)
12 August 2008; 14:00	Hao 5	(7–19)	three players 5	Olympic Sports Centre Gymnasium; Referees: Canbro, Claesson (SWE)
12 August 2008; 14:00	3× (yellow card) 4× (suspension)	Report	3× (yellow card) 2× (suspension)	Olympic Sports Centre Gymnasium; Referees: Canbro, Claesson (SWE)

12 August 2008; 15:45	Spain	30 – 29	Poland	Olympic Sports Centre Gymnasium; Referees: Chernega, Poladenko (RUS)
12 August 2008; 15:45	Rocas 7	(16–17)	Jurasik, Lijewski 4	Olympic Sports Centre Gymnasium; Referees: Chernega, Poladenko (RUS)
12 August 2008; 15:45	3× (yellow card) 1× (suspension)	Report	4× (yellow card) 5× (suspension)	Olympic Sports Centre Gymnasium; Referees: Chernega, Poladenko (RUS)

14 August 2008; 10:45	Poland	28 – 25	Brazil	Olympic Sports Centre Gymnasium; Referees: Karbaschi, Kolahdouzan (IRI)
14 August 2008; 10:45	Jurecki, Tłuczyński 6	(14–15)	Ribeiro 7	Olympic Sports Centre Gymnasium; Referees: Karbaschi, Kolahdouzan (IRI)
14 August 2008; 10:45	3× (yellow card) 2× (suspension)	Report	3× (yellow card) 5× (suspension)	Olympic Sports Centre Gymnasium; Referees: Karbaschi, Kolahdouzan (IRI)

14 August 2008; 15:45	China	22 – 36	Spain	Olympic Sports Centre Gymnasium; Referees: Elmoamli, Shaban Ali (EGY)
14 August 2008; 15:45	Cui 5	(12–16)	Tomás 7	Olympic Sports Centre Gymnasium; Referees: Elmoamli, Shaban Ali (EGY)
14 August 2008; 15:45	3× (yellow card) 2× (suspension)	Report	3× (yellow card) 1× (suspension)	Olympic Sports Centre Gymnasium; Referees: Elmoamli, Shaban Ali (EGY)

14 August 2008; 20:45	France	23 – 19	Croatia	Olympic Sports Centre Gymnasium; Referees: Chernega, Paladenko (RUS)
14 August 2008; 20:45	Gille 7	(11–9)	Džomba 5	Olympic Sports Centre Gymnasium; Referees: Chernega, Paladenko (RUS)
14 August 2008; 20:45	3× (yellow card) 2× (suspension)	Report	3× (yellow card) 4× (suspension)	Olympic Sports Centre Gymnasium; Referees: Chernega, Paladenko (RUS)

16 August 2008; 09:00	Brazil	29 – 22	China	Olympic Sports Centre Gymnasium; Referees: Elmoamli, Shaban Ali (EGY)
16 August 2008; 09:00	Ribeiro, Laureano 5	(14–10)	Cui Liang, Cui Lei 4	Olympic Sports Centre Gymnasium; Referees: Elmoamli, Shaban Ali (EGY)
16 August 2008; 09:00	3× (yellow card) 3× (suspension)	Report	4× (yellow card) 4× (suspension)	Olympic Sports Centre Gymnasium; Referees: Elmoamli, Shaban Ali (EGY)

16 August 2008; 14:00	France	28 – 21	Spain	Olympic Sports Centre Gymnasium; Referees: Lemme, Ullrich (GER)
16 August 2008; 14:00	Gille 6	(16–10)	García 7	Olympic Sports Centre Gymnasium; Referees: Lemme, Ullrich (GER)
16 August 2008; 14:00	3× (yellow card) 3× (suspension)	Report	3× (yellow card) 3× (suspension)	Olympic Sports Centre Gymnasium; Referees: Lemme, Ullrich (GER)

16 August 2008; 19:00	Croatia	24 – 27	Poland	Olympic Sports Centre Gymnasium; Referees: Gjeding, Hansen (DEN)
16 August 2008; 19:00	Džomba 7	(12–13)	Tłuczyński 7	Olympic Sports Centre Gymnasium; Referees: Gjeding, Hansen (DEN)
16 August 2008; 19:00	3× (yellow card) 2× (suspension)	Report	2× (yellow card) 2× (suspension)	Olympic Sports Centre Gymnasium; Referees: Gjeding, Hansen (DEN)

18 August 2008; 10:45	Spain	36 – 35	Brazil	Olympic Sports Centre Gymnasium; Referees: Baum, Goralczyk (POL)
18 August 2008; 10:45	Romero 8	(20–17)	Pacheco Filho 12	Olympic Sports Centre Gymnasium; Referees: Baum, Goralczyk (POL)
18 August 2008; 10:45	3× (yellow card) 4× (suspension) 1× (red card)	Report	3× (yellow card) 3× (suspension) 1× (red card)	Olympic Sports Centre Gymnasium; Referees: Baum, Goralczyk (POL)

18 August 2008; 15:45	Croatia	33 – 22	China	Olympic Sports Centre Gymnasium; Referees: Karbaschi, Kolahdouzan (IRI)
18 August 2008; 15:45	Šprem 8	(17–13)	Hao 6	Olympic Sports Centre Gymnasium; Referees: Karbaschi, Kolahdouzan (IRI)
18 August 2008; 15:45	2× (yellow card) 3× (suspension)	Report	3× (yellow card) 1× (suspension) 1× (red card)	Olympic Sports Centre Gymnasium; Referees: Karbaschi, Kolahdouzan (IRI)

18 August 2008; 20:45	Poland	30 – 30	France	Olympic Sports Centre Gymnasium; Referees: Liudowyk, Vakula (UKR)
18 August 2008; 20:45	Jurecki 7	(16–13)	Karabatić 8	Olympic Sports Centre Gymnasium; Referees: Liudowyk, Vakula (UKR)
18 August 2008; 20:45	2× (yellow card) 2× (suspension)	Report	3× (yellow card) 3× (suspension)	Olympic Sports Centre Gymnasium; Referees: Liudowyk, Vakula (UKR)

=== Group B ===
Team	Pld	W	D	L	GF	GA	GD	Pts	Qualification
South Korea	5	3	0	2	122	129	−7	6	Qualified for the quarterfinals
Denmark	5	2	2	1	137	131	+6	6	Qualified for the quarterfinals
Iceland	5	2	2	1	151	146	+5	6	Qualified for the quarterfinals
Russia	5	2	1	2	136	131	+5	5	Qualified for the quarterfinals
Germany	5	2	1	2	126	130	−4	5	
Egypt	5	0	2	3	127	132	−5	2	

10 August 2008; 10:45	Russia	31 – 33	Iceland	Olympic Sports Centre Gymnasium; Referees: Krstic, Ljubic (SLO)
10 August 2008; 10:45	Igropulo 9	(16–19)	Guðjónsson 12	Olympic Sports Centre Gymnasium; Referees: Krstic, Ljubic (SLO)
10 August 2008; 10:45	3× (yellow card) 6× (suspension)	Report	3× (yellow card) 3× (suspension)	Olympic Sports Centre Gymnasium; Referees: Krstic, Ljubic (SLO)

10 August 2008; 15:45	Germany	27 – 23	South Korea	Olympic Sports Centre Gymnasium; Referees: Canbro, Claesson (SWE)
10 August 2008; 15:45	Kraus 7	(10–13)	Cho Chi-hyo 7	Olympic Sports Centre Gymnasium; Referees: Canbro, Claesson (SWE)
10 August 2008; 15:45	3× (yellow card) 3× (suspension)	Report	3× (yellow card) 3× (suspension)	Olympic Sports Centre Gymnasium; Referees: Canbro, Claesson (SWE)

10 August 2008; 20:45	Denmark	23 – 23	Egypt	Olympic Sports Centre Gymnasium; Referees: Bord, Buy (FRA)
10 August 2008; 20:45	Christiansen 6	(11–10)	El-Ahmar 8	Olympic Sports Centre Gymnasium; Referees: Bord, Buy (FRA)
10 August 2008; 20:45	3× (yellow card) 4× (suspension) 1× (red card)	Report	4× (yellow card) 4× (suspension)	Olympic Sports Centre Gymnasium; Referees: Bord, Buy (FRA)

12 August 2008; 10:45	Egypt	27 – 28	Russia	Olympic Sports Centre Gymnasium; Referees: Liudowyk, Vakula (UKR)
12 August 2008; 10:45	El Ahmar 10	(14–14)	Rastvortsev 8	Olympic Sports Centre Gymnasium; Referees: Liudowyk, Vakula (UKR)
12 August 2008; 10:45	3× (yellow card) 4× (suspension)	Report	3× (yellow card) 4× (suspension)	Olympic Sports Centre Gymnasium; Referees: Liudowyk, Vakula (UKR)

12 August 2008; 19:00	South Korea	31 – 30	Denmark	Olympic Sports Centre Gymnasium; Referees: Licis, Stolarovs (LAT)
12 August 2008; 19:00	Jung Su-young 9	(13–14)	Nøddesbo 11	Olympic Sports Centre Gymnasium; Referees: Licis, Stolarovs (LAT)
12 August 2008; 19:00	2× (yellow card) 1× (suspension)	Report	3× (yellow card) 2× (suspension)	Olympic Sports Centre Gymnasium; Referees: Licis, Stolarovs (LAT)

12 August 2008; 20:45	Iceland	33 – 29	Germany	Olympic Sports Centre Gymnasium; Referees: Bord, Buy (FRA)
12 August 2008; 20:45	Guðjónsson 8	(17–14)	Kraus 13	Olympic Sports Centre Gymnasium; Referees: Bord, Buy (FRA)
12 August 2008; 20:45	3× (yellow card) 2× (suspension)	Report	2× (yellow card) 5× (suspension) 1× (red card)	Olympic Sports Centre Gymnasium; Referees: Bord, Buy (FRA)

14 August 2008; 09:00	Germany	25 – 23	Egypt	Olympic Sports Centre Gymnasium; Referees: Krstic, Ljubic (SLO)
14 August 2008; 09:00	Glandorf 7	(14–14)	Zaky 7	Olympic Sports Centre Gymnasium; Referees: Krstic, Ljubic (SLO)
14 August 2008; 09:00	3× (yellow card) 5× (suspension)	Report	4× (yellow card) 8× (suspension)	Olympic Sports Centre Gymnasium; Referees: Krstic, Ljubic (SLO)

14 August 2008; 14:00	South Korea	22 – 21	Iceland	Olympic Sports Centre Gymnasium; Referees: Baum, Goralczyk (POL)
14 August 2008; 14:00	Yoon Kyung-shin 6	(10–9)	Geirsson, Sigurðsson 5	Olympic Sports Centre Gymnasium; Referees: Baum, Goralczyk (POL)
14 August 2008; 14:00	3× (yellow card) 1× (suspension)	Report	4× (yellow card) 3× (suspension)	Olympic Sports Centre Gymnasium; Referees: Baum, Goralczyk (POL)

14 August 2008; 19:00	Denmark	25 – 24	Russia	Olympic Sports Centre Gymnasium; Referees: Breto, Huelin (ESP)
14 August 2008; 19:00	Christiansen 6	(10–10)	Chernoivanov, Igropulo 6	Olympic Sports Centre Gymnasium; Referees: Breto, Huelin (ESP)
14 August 2008; 19:00	2× (yellow card) 3× (suspension)	Report	3× (yellow card) 4× (suspension)	Olympic Sports Centre Gymnasium; Referees: Breto, Huelin (ESP)

16 August 2008; 10:45	Egypt	22 – 24	South Korea	Olympic Sports Centre Gymnasium; Referees: Breto, Huelin (ESP)
16 August 2008; 10:45	Abd Elsalam 8	(11–8)	Paek Won-chul 7	Olympic Sports Centre Gymnasium; Referees: Breto, Huelin (ESP)
16 August 2008; 10:45	3× (yellow card) 6× (suspension) 1× (red card)	Report	3× (yellow card) 3× (suspension)	Olympic Sports Centre Gymnasium; Referees: Breto, Huelin (ESP)

16 August 2008; 15:45	Russia	24 – 24	Germany	Olympic Sports Centre Gymnasium; Referees: Gjeding, Hansen (DEN)
16 August 2008; 15:45	Filippov 6	(11–10)	Kraus 6	Olympic Sports Centre Gymnasium; Referees: Gjeding, Hansen (DEN)
16 August 2008; 15:45	1× (yellow card) 6× (suspension) 1× (red card)	Report	4× (yellow card) 3× (suspension)	Olympic Sports Centre Gymnasium; Referees: Gjeding, Hansen (DEN)

16 August 2008; 20:45	Denmark	32 – 32	Iceland	Olympic Sports Centre Gymnasium; Referees: Canbro, Claesson (SWE)
16 August 2008; 20:45	Nøddesbo 6	(18–17)	Guðjónsson 8	Olympic Sports Centre Gymnasium; Referees: Canbro, Claesson (SWE)
16 August 2008; 20:45	3× (yellow card) 5× (suspension)	Report	2× (yellow card) 6× (suspension) 1× (red card)	Olympic Sports Centre Gymnasium; Referees: Canbro, Claesson (SWE)

18 August 2008; 09:00	Iceland	32 – 32	Egypt	Olympic Sports Centre Gymnasium; Referees: Din, Dinu (ROU)
18 August 2008; 09:00	Sigurðsson 10	(14–17)	Zaky 9	Olympic Sports Centre Gymnasium; Referees: Din, Dinu (ROU)
18 August 2008; 09:00	4× (yellow card) 4× (suspension)	Report	3× (yellow card) 6× (suspension)	Olympic Sports Centre Gymnasium; Referees: Din, Dinu (ROU)

18 August 2008; 14:00	Russia	29 – 22	South Korea	Olympic Sports Centre Gymnasium; Referees: Bord, Buy (FRA)
18 August 2008; 14:00	Rastvortsev 6	(17–12)	Yoon Kyung-shin 7	Olympic Sports Centre Gymnasium; Referees: Bord, Buy (FRA)
18 August 2008; 14:00	3× (yellow card) 4× (suspension)	Report	1× (yellow card) 1× (suspension)	Olympic Sports Centre Gymnasium; Referees: Bord, Buy (FRA)

18 August 2008; 19:00	Germany	21 – 27	Denmark	Olympic Sports Centre Gymnasium; Referees: Krstic, Ljubic (SLO)
18 August 2008; 19:00	Kraus 6	(12–15)	Boesen 8	Olympic Sports Centre Gymnasium; Referees: Krstic, Ljubic (SLO)
18 August 2008; 19:00	4× (yellow card) 4× (suspension) 1× (red card)	Report	3× (yellow card) 6× (suspension)	Olympic Sports Centre Gymnasium; Referees: Krstic, Ljubic (SLO)

== Medal round ==
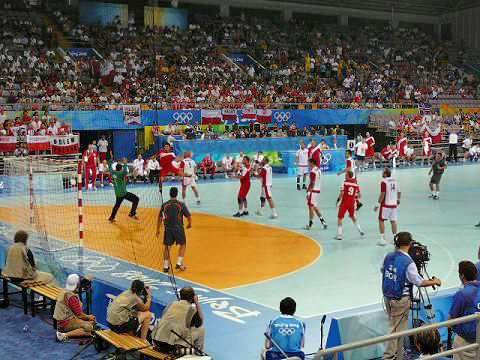
Quarterfinal, Poland-Iceland

All times are China Standard Time (UTC+8)

Quarterfinals
A2	Poland	30
B3	Iceland	32
B1	South Korea	24
A4	Spain	29
B2	Denmark	24
A3	Croatia	26
A1	France	27
B4	Russia	24

Semifinals
B3	Iceland	36
A4	Spain	30
A3	Croatia	23
A1	France	25

Gold medal game
Iceland	23
France	28
Bronze medal game
Spain	35
4	Croatia	29

=== Quarterfinals ===
20 August 2008; 12:00	France	27 – 24	Russia	Olympic Sports Centre Gymnasium; Referees: Lemme, Ullrich (GER)
20 August 2008; 12:00	Narcisse 9	(13–10)	Kokcharov 5	Olympic Sports Centre Gymnasium; Referees: Lemme, Ullrich (GER)
20 August 2008; 12:00	4× (yellow card) 2× (suspension)	Report	3× (yellow card) 2× (suspension)	Olympic Sports Centre Gymnasium; Referees: Lemme, Ullrich (GER)

20 August 2008; 14:15	Poland	30 – 32	Iceland	Olympic Sports Centre Gymnasium; Referees: Bord, Buy (FRA)
20 August 2008; 14:15	Jachlewski, Tkaczyk 6	(19–14)	Petersson 6	Olympic Sports Centre Gymnasium; Referees: Bord, Buy (FRA)
20 August 2008; 14:15	3× (yellow card) 8× (suspension) 1× (red card)	Report	2× (yellow card) 3× (suspension)	Olympic Sports Centre Gymnasium; Referees: Bord, Buy (FRA)

20 August 2008; 18:00	Denmark	24 – 26	Croatia	Olympic Sports Centre Gymnasium; Referees: Breto, Huelin (ESP)
20 August 2008; 18:00	Christiansen 6	(14–12)	Šprem 7	Olympic Sports Centre Gymnasium; Referees: Breto, Huelin (ESP)
20 August 2008; 18:00	2× (yellow card) 2× (suspension)	Report	2× (yellow card) 4× (suspension)	Olympic Sports Centre Gymnasium; Referees: Breto, Huelin (ESP)

20 August 2008; 20:15	South Korea	24 – 29	Spain	Olympic Sports Centre Gymnasium; Referees: Gjeding, Hansen (DEN)
20 August 2008; 20:15	Jeong Yi-kyeong 7	(13–14)	Rocas 8	Olympic Sports Centre Gymnasium; Referees: Gjeding, Hansen (DEN)
20 August 2008; 20:15	3× (yellow card) 3× (suspension)	Report	2× (yellow card) 5× (suspension)	Olympic Sports Centre Gymnasium; Referees: Gjeding, Hansen (DEN)

=== Classification ===
22 August 2008; 12:00	Russia	28 – 27	Denmark	Beijing National Indoor Stadium; Referees: Elmoamli, Shaban Ali (EGY)
22 August 2008; 12:00	Dibirov 8	(17–14)	Christiansen 8	Beijing National Indoor Stadium; Referees: Elmoamli, Shaban Ali (EGY)
22 August 2008; 12:00	4× (yellow card) 2× (suspension)	Report	4× (yellow card) 5× (suspension) 1× (red card)	Beijing National Indoor Stadium; Referees: Elmoamli, Shaban Ali (EGY)

22 August 2008; 14:15	Poland	29 – 26	South Korea	Beijing National Indoor Stadium; Referees: Canbro, Claesson (SWE)
22 August 2008; 14:15	Jurasik 7	(15–14)	Yoon Kyung-shin 6	Beijing National Indoor Stadium; Referees: Canbro, Claesson (SWE)
22 August 2008; 14:15	3× (yellow card) 3× (suspension)	Report	3× (yellow card) 5× (suspension)	Beijing National Indoor Stadium; Referees: Canbro, Claesson (SWE)

=== Semifinals ===
22 August 2008; 18:00	France	25 – 23	Croatia	Beijing National Indoor Stadium; Referees: Chernega, Poladenko (RUS)
22 August 2008; 18:00	Burdet, Narcisse 6	(12–11)	Horvat, Šprem 5	Beijing National Indoor Stadium; Referees: Chernega, Poladenko (RUS)
22 August 2008; 18:00	4× (yellow card) 4× (suspension)	Report	3× (yellow card) 3× (suspension)	Beijing National Indoor Stadium; Referees: Chernega, Poladenko (RUS)

22 August 2008; 20:15	Iceland	36 – 30	Spain	Beijing National Indoor Stadium; Referees: Krstic, Ljubic (SLO)
22 August 2008; 20:15	Sigurðsson, Geirsson 7	(17–15)	Rocas 7	Beijing National Indoor Stadium; Referees: Krstic, Ljubic (SLO)
22 August 2008; 20:15	4× (yellow card) 9× (suspension)	Report	3× (yellow card) 5× (suspension) 1× (red card)	Beijing National Indoor Stadium; Referees: Krstic, Ljubic (SLO)

=== 7th–8th place ===
24 August 2008; 08:00	Denmark	37 – 26	South Korea	Beijing National Indoor Stadium; Referees: Aires Menezes, Aparecido Pinto (BRA)
24 August 2008; 08:00	Hansen 8	(15–13)	Ko Kyung-soo 10	Beijing National Indoor Stadium; Referees: Aires Menezes, Aparecido Pinto (BRA)
24 August 2008; 08:00	3× (yellow card) 4× (suspension)	Report	2× (yellow card) 1× (suspension)	Beijing National Indoor Stadium; Referees: Aires Menezes, Aparecido Pinto (BRA)

=== 5th–6th place ===
24 August 2008; 10:15	Russia	28 – 29	Poland	Beijing National Indoor Stadium; Referees: Karbaschi, Kolahdouzan (IRI)
24 August 2008; 10:15	Kokcharov 10	(15–14)	Jurasik 6	Beijing National Indoor Stadium; Referees: Karbaschi, Kolahdouzan (IRI)
24 August 2008; 10:15	4× (yellow card) 5× (suspension)	Report	4× (yellow card) 4× (suspension)	Beijing National Indoor Stadium; Referees: Karbaschi, Kolahdouzan (IRI)

=== Bronze medal match ===
24 August 2008; 13:30	Croatia	29 – 35	Spain	Beijing National Indoor Stadium; Referees: Din, Dinu (ROU)
24 August 2008; 13:30	Duvnjak 7	(14–12)	García, Prieto 7	Beijing National Indoor Stadium; Referees: Din, Dinu (ROU)
24 August 2008; 13:30	3× (yellow card) 4× (suspension)	Report	3× (yellow card) 5× (suspension)	Beijing National Indoor Stadium; Referees: Din, Dinu (ROU)

=== Gold medal match ===
24 August 2008; 15:45	Iceland	23 – 28	France	Beijing National Indoor Stadium; Referees: Lemme, Ullrich (GER)
24 August 2008; 15:45	Stefánsson 5	(10–15)	Karabatić 8	Beijing National Indoor Stadium; Referees: Lemme, Ullrich (GER)
24 August 2008; 15:45	3× (yellow card) 4× (suspension)	Report	3× (yellow card) 3× (suspension)	Beijing National Indoor Stadium; Referees: Lemme, Ullrich (GER)

== Ranking and statistics ==
=== Final ranking ===
Rank	Team
1st place, gold medalist(s)	France
2nd place, silver medalist(s)	Iceland
3rd place, bronze medalist(s)	Spain
4	Croatia
5	Poland
6	Russia
7	Denmark
8	South Korea
9	Germany
10	Egypt
11	Brazil
12	China

- Source: IHF.info

=== All star team ===
- Goalkeeper: (France) Thierry Omeyer
- Left wing: (Iceland) Guðjón Valur Sigurðsson
- Left back: (France) Daniel Narcisse
- Centre back: (Iceland) Snorri Guðjónsson
- Right back: (Iceland) Ólafur Stefánsson
- Right wing: (Spain) Albert Rocas
- Line player/pivot: (France) Bertrand Gille

Chosen by team officials and IHF experts: IHF.info

=== Top goalkeepers ===
Rank	Name	Team	%	Saves	Shots
1	Johannes Bitter	Germany	41%	70	170
1	Thierry Omeyer	France	41%	84	204
3	Mohamed Nakib	Egypt	40%	59	149
4	Sławomir Szmal	Poland	37%	85	227
5	David Barrufet	Spain	36%	59	165
5	Oleg Grams	Russia	36%	91	250
5	Kasper Hvidt	Denmark	36%	94	250
5	Alexey Kostygov	Russia	36%	31	86
5	Maik Santos	Brazil	36%	52	145
10	Björgvin Páll Gústavsson	Iceland	33%	75	226
10	Han Kyung-Tai	South Korea	33%	67	204
10	Venio Losert	Croatia	33%	44	135

=== Top goalscorers ===
Rank	Name	Team	Goals	Shots	%
1	Juan García	Spain	49	65	75%
2	Snorri Guðjónsson	Iceland	48	77	62%
3	Guðjón Valur Sigurðsson	Iceland	43	66	65%
4	Lars Christiansen	Denmark	42	59	71%
5	Michael Kraus	Germany	38	65	58%
6	Mariusz Jurasik	Poland	37	59	63%
6	Nikola Karabatić	France	37	69	54%
8	Konstantin Igropulo	Russia	36	63	57%
8	Jesper Nøddesbo	Denmark	36	47	77%
10	Bertrand Gille	France	35	48	73%
10	Daniel Narcisse	France	35	69	51%
10	Albert Rocas	Spain	35	54	65%
