= Piotr Nurowski =

Polish tennis player (1945–2010)

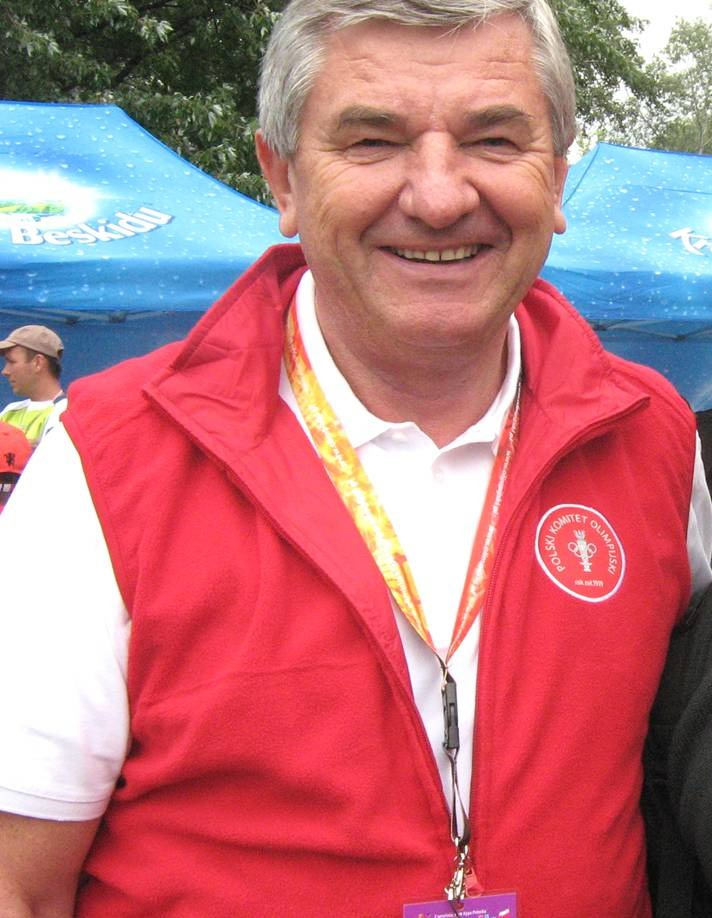
Nurowski in 2007

Piotr Jan Nurowski (20 June 1945 – 10 April 2010) was a Polish tennis player and the chief of the Polish Olympic Committee.

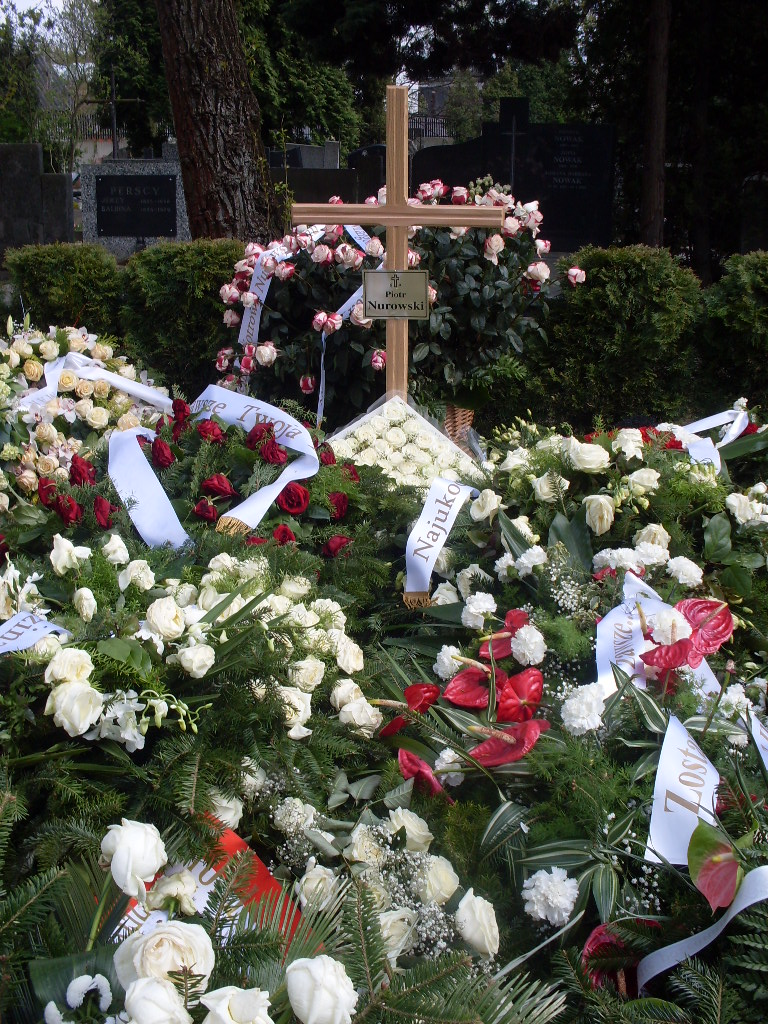
Grave of Piotr Nurowski at Military Powązki Cemetery

Nurowski was born in Sandomierz. He died in Smolensk, Russia in the 2010 Polish Air Force Tu-154 crash.

On 16 April 2010, he was posthumously awarded the Commander's Cross of the Order of Polonia Restituta. He was buried in the Alley of the Meritorious in the Military Cemetery in Warsaw.

== Functions ==
- 1973–1980: President of Polish Athletics Federation

Vice President of Children and Youth Sports Association
Member of the Polish Athletics Development Foundation

- 2005–2010: President Polish Olympic Committee

Sporting positions
Preceded by Stanisław Stefan Paszczyk	President of the Polish Olympic Committee; 2005–2010	Succeeded by Andrzej Kraśnicki
