= Zondacrypto =

Former cryptocurrency exchange

- Formerly: BitBay
- Type: Private
- Industry: Cryptocurrency exchange
- Founded: 2014; 12 years ago
- Founder: Sylwester Suszek
- Services: Cryptocurrency trading, payment gateway
- Parent: BB Trade Estonia OÜ
- Website: zondacrypto.com

Zondacrypto (formerly BitBay) was a European cryptocurrency exchange. Originally founded in Poland in 2014 by Sylwester Suszek, it grew to become one of the largest digital asset trading platforms in Central and Eastern Europe. Suszek disappeared in March 2022, and the site went offline in April 2026, leaving client assets stranded.

== History ==
The exchange was initially established as BitBay in 2014. Following regulatory warnings from the Polish Financial Supervision Authority (KNF) in 2018, the platform relocated its operational registry from Poland to Estonia and subsequently rebranded as Zondacrypto.

In 2022, founder Sylwester Suszek disappeared under unresolved circumstances, after which leadership of the firm was assumed by Przemysław Kral.

In April 2026, amid reports of severe liquidity problems and clients having trouble withdrawing funds, Polish prime minister Donald Tusk alleged that Zondacrypto was funded by the Russian mafia and had made large donations to politicians. In June 2026, Estonia's Financial Intelligence Unit (FIU) revoked the operating license of BB Trade Estonia OÜ. Simultaneously, Polish law enforcement authorities initiated a criminal fraud investigation into the platform, following over 1,500 customer complaints regarding suspended withdrawals and inaccessible funds involving a dispute over access to approximately 4,500 bitcoin (then app. 300 mio. USD). In summer 2026, The New York Times among other outlets reported that Kral had vanished, probably to Dubai. In August, Polish high-key lawyer and politician Roman Giertych posed as his prospective defender. In August 2026 BB Trade Estonia OÜ was declared bankrupt.

In August 2026, Polish Olympic Committee president Radosław Piesiewicz was arrested for accepting bribes to sign a sponsorship contract with Zondacrypto.
