= Daniel Waszkiewicz =

Polish handball player (born 1957)

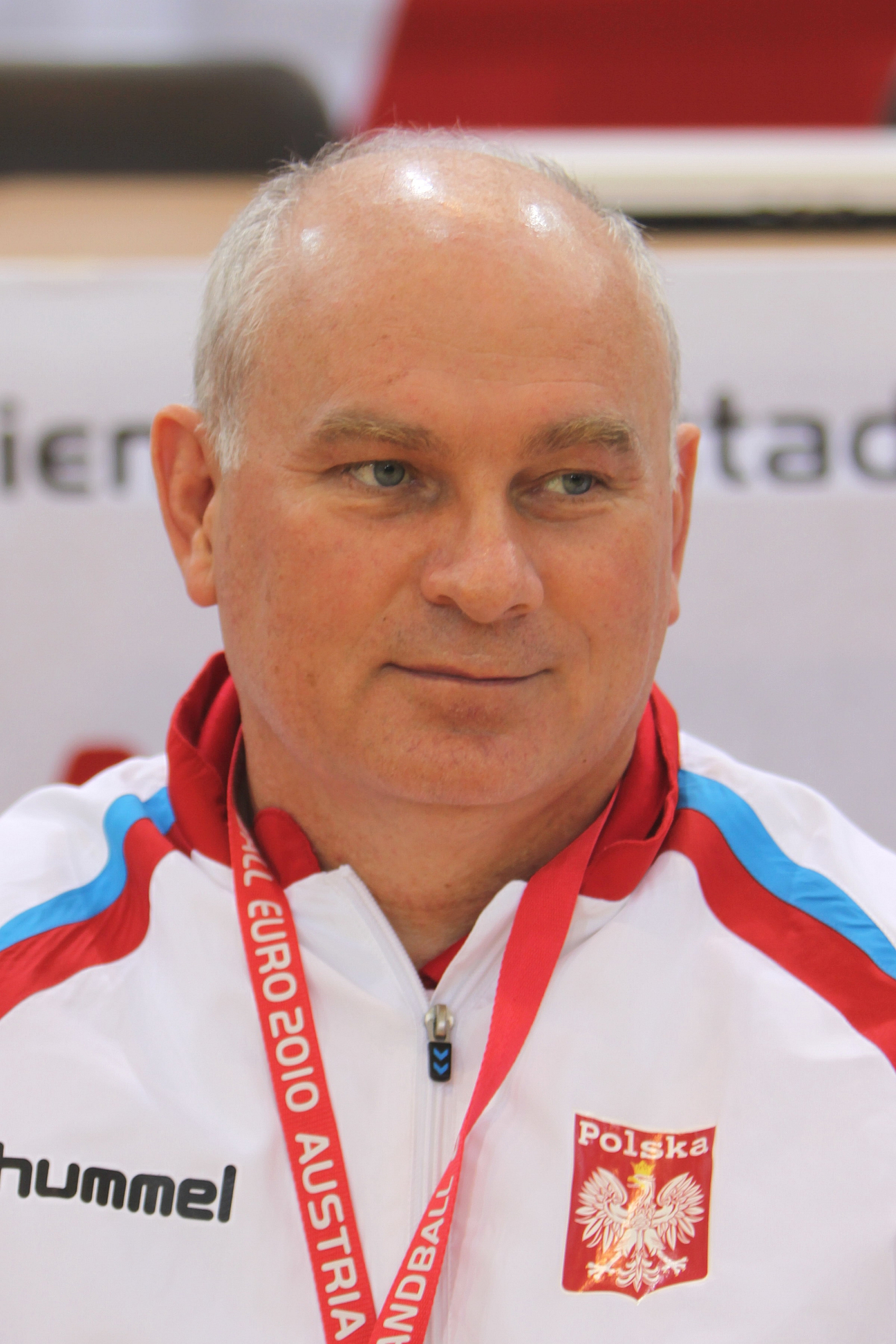

Personal information
- Nationality: Polish
- Born: 7 January 1957 (age 69) Chocianów

Sport
- Sport: Handball
National team
- Years: Team
- –: Poland

Daniel Waszkiewicz (born 7 January 1957, in Chocianów) is a former Polish team handball player. He played more than 200 matches for the Poland men's national handball team during his career. He participated at the 1980 Summer Olympics, where Poland finished 7th.
