= Jota González =

Spanish handball coach (born 1972)

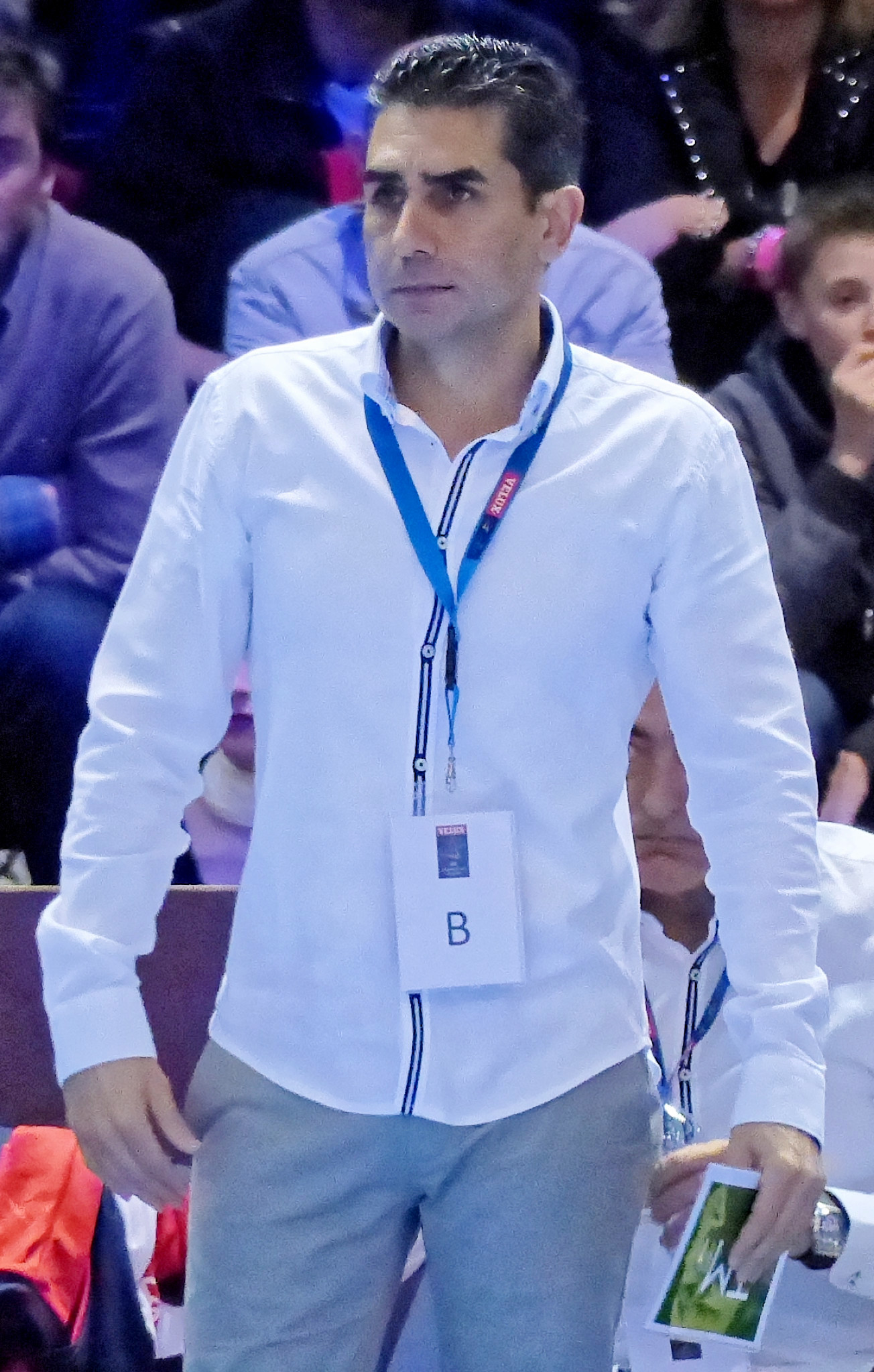

Personal information
- Full name: Jesús Javier González Fernández
- Nationality: Spanish
- Born: 2 February 1972 (age 54) Valladolid, Spain

Sport
- Sport: Handball
- Current club: Benfica (manager)

Teams managed
- Years: Team
- 2007–2018: CBM Logroño La Rioja
- 2018–2023: Paris Saint-Germain (assistant)
- 2023–2026: Benfica
- 2025–: Poland

Jesús Javier González Fernández (born 2 February 1972), known as Jota González, is a Spanish handball coach for the Polish national team and Portuguese club Benfica. He was the manager of Liga ASOBAL club Naturhouse La Rioja, and has taken the team to the EHF Cup.

== Coaching achievements ==
=== Club ===
Naturhouse La Rioja

- Liga ASOBAL:
  - Silver Medalist: 2014, 2015, 2016
  - Bronze Medalist: 2013
- Copa ASOBAL:
  - Finalist: 2016
- Supercopa ASOBAL:
  - Finalist: 2013
- Copa del Rey:
  - Finalist: 2013
- EHF Cup:
  - Semifinalist: 2010, 2011

== Individual awards and recognitions ==
- Liga ASOBAL Coach of the Year: 2011, 2013
