= Marcin Lijewski =

Polish handball coach (born 1977)

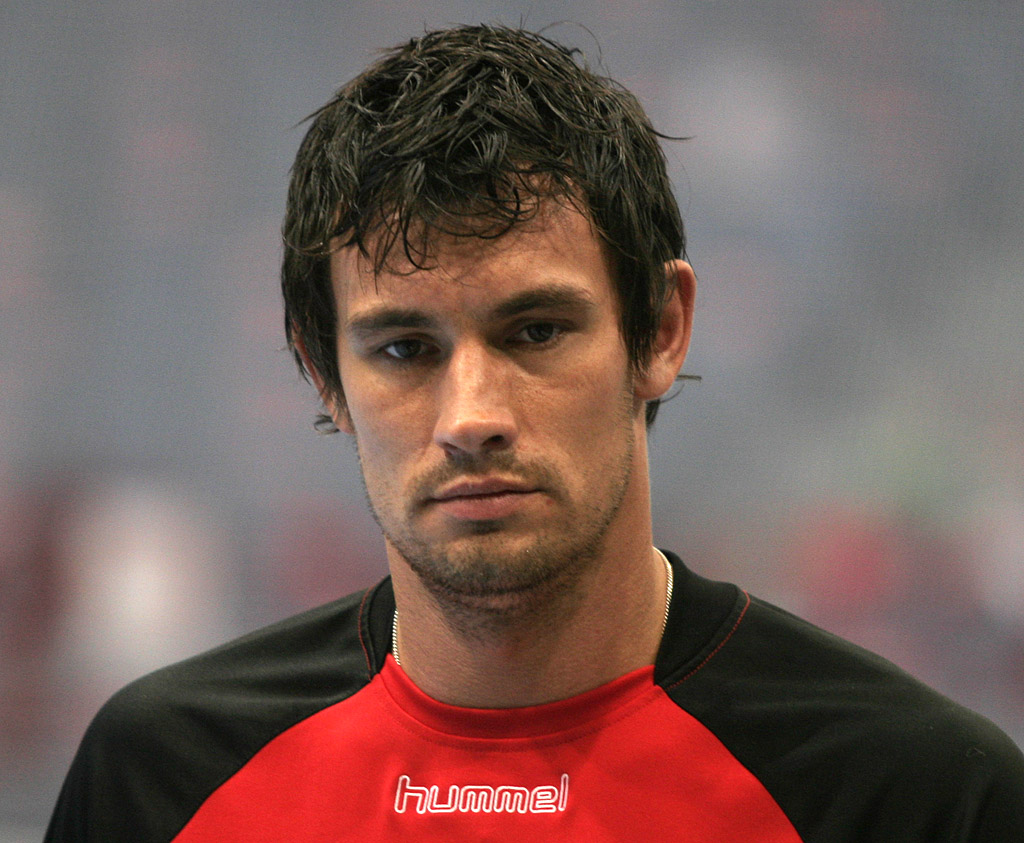

Personal information
- Nationality: Polish
- Born: 21 September 1977 (age 49) Krotoszyn, Poland
- Height: 1.97 m (6 ft 6 in)

Sport
- Sport: Handball
- Position: Right back

Youth career
- Years: Team
- 1991–1996: KPR Ostrovia

Senior clubs
- Years: Team
- 1996–2001: Wybrzeże Gdańsk
- 2001–2002: Wisła Płock
- 2002–2008: SG Flensburg-Handewitt
- 2008–2013: HSV Hamburg
- 2013–2014: Wisła Płock
- 2014–2015: Wybrzeże Gdańsk
- 2014: → Samen Al-Hojaj (loan)
National team
Years	Team	Apps	(Gls)
1997–2013	Poland	251	(711)

Teams managed
- 2015–2017: Wybrzeże Gdańsk (assistant)
- 2017–2019: Wybrzeże Gdańsk
- 2019–2022: NMC Górnik Zabrze
- 2023–2025: Poland
Medal record
World Championship
Silver medal – second place	2007 Germany
Bronze medal – third place	2009 Croatia

Marcin Lijewski (born 21 September 1977) is a former Polish handball player and the current coach of Poland. As a player he received a silver medal with the Polish team at the 2007 World Men's Handball Championship in Germany and a bronze medal at the 2009 World Men's Handball Championship in Croatia. He participated at the 2008 Summer Olympics, where Poland finished 5th.

== Sporting achievements ==
=== State awards ===
- 2007 Gold Cross of Merit

== Personal life ==
His brother Krzysztof Lijewski is also a former handball player and current assistant coach at Industria Kielce.
