= Tomasz Tłuczyński =

Polish handball player (born 1979)

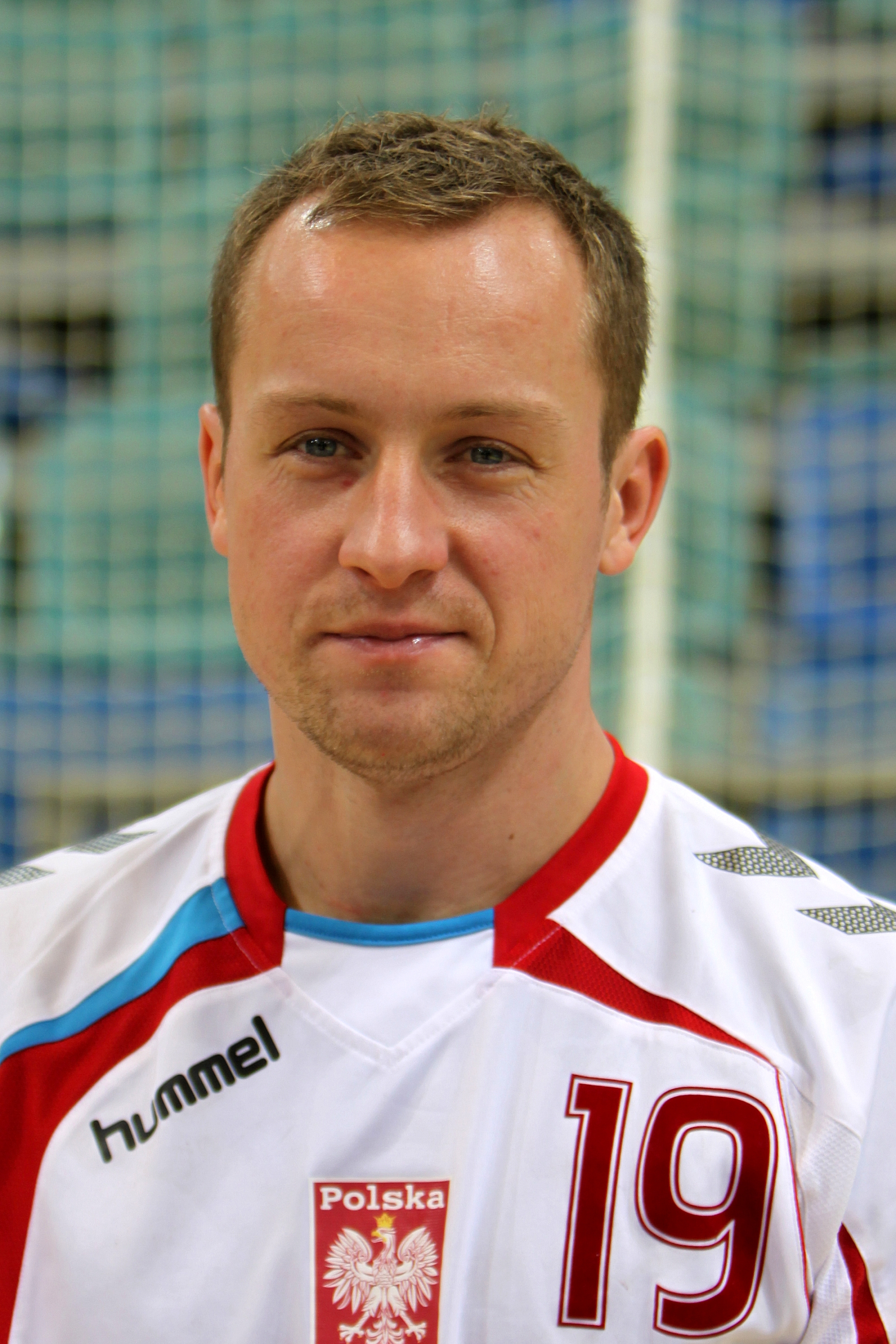

Personal information
- Nationality: Polish
- Born: 19 April 1979 (age 47) Kielce, Poland
- Height: 1.82 m (6 ft 0 in)

Sport
- Sport: Handball
- Position: Left wing

Senior clubs
- Years: Team
- 1998–1999: VfL Gummersbach
- 1999–2002: TV Emsdetten
- 2002–2005: Eintracht Hildesheim
- 2005–2009: TSV Hannover-Burgdorf
- 2009–2013: TuS Nettelstedt-Lübbecke
National team
Years	Team	Apps	(Gls)
2006–2012	Poland	126	(503)
Medal record
World Championships
Silver medal – second place	2007 Germany	Team
Bronze medal – third place	2009 Croatia	Team

Tomasz Tłuczyński (born 19 April 1979) is a retired Polish team handball player, who was playing on the Poland men's national handball team. He received a silver medal with the Polish team at the 2007 World Men's Handball Championship. He participated at the 2008 Summer Olympics, where Poland finished 5th. He also received a bronze medal with the Polish team at the 2009 World Men's Handball Championship.

His father, Zbigniew Tłuczyński is also a handballer.
