= Sławomir Szmal =

Polish handball player (born 1978)

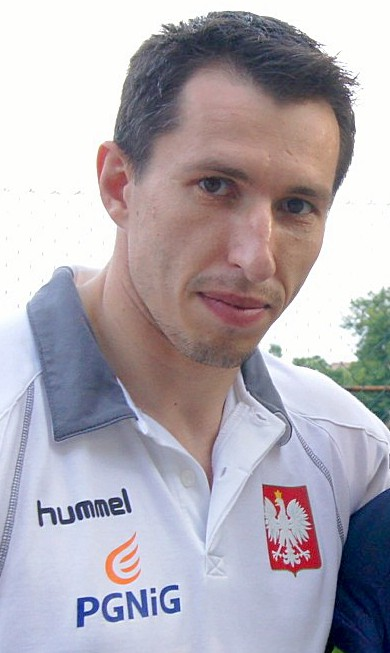

Personal information
- Nationality: Polish
- Born: 2 October 1978 (age 48) Strzelce Opolskie, Poland
- Height: 1.86 m (6 ft 1 in)

Sport
- Sport: Handball
- Position: Goalkeeper
- Current club: Polish Handball Association (president)

Senior clubs
- Years: Team
- 1996–1997: Gwardia Opole
- 1997–1999: Huntnik Kraków
- 1999–2002: KS Warszawianka
- 2002–2003: Wisła Płock
- 2003–2005: TuS Nettelstedt-Lübbecke
- 2005–2010: Rhein-Neckar Löwen
- 2010–2018: Vive Kielce
National team
Years	Team	Apps	(Gls)
1998–2016	Poland	298	(3)
Medal record
World Championship
Silver medal – second place	2007 Germany
Bronze medal – third place	2009 Croatia
Bronze medal – third place	2015 Qatar

Sławomir Szmal (born 2 October 1978) is a Polish former handball player, who played for the Poland men's national handball team, a participant in the 2008 Olympic Games], and a medalist in the World Championship (silver in 2007, bronzes in 2009, 2015). He is currently the president of the Polish Handball Association.

In 2009, he was named the IHF World Player of the Year.

== Career ==
=== National team ===
On 19 August 1998, he debuted for the national team in a match against Lithuania (31:20). On 4 February 2007, he won a silver medal at the World Championship, after losing the final match with Germany (24:29). For his sport achievements he received the Gold Cross of Merit in 2007.

He won a bronze medal at the 2009 World Championship. In 2009, Szmal was voted IHF World Player of the Year, while Igor Vori came 2nd and Nikola Karabatić came 3rd.

On 1 February 2015, Poland, including Szmal, won the bronze medal at the 2015 World Championship. They won the bronze medal match (29:28) against Spain.

== Personal life ==
Szmal was born in Strzelce Opolskie, Poland. He is married to Aneta, who is a former handball player. They have a son named Filip.

== Sporting achievements ==
=== State awards ===
- 2007 Gold Cross of Merit
- 2015 Knight's Cross of Polonia Restituta
- 2009 IHF World Player of the Year
