= Polish Golf Union =

Polish Golf Union (Polish: Polski Związek Golfa) is an association of Polish Golf clubs. It was founded on 31 July 1993 in Warsaw. The following Founding Associations took part in the PGU founding meeting: First Warsaw Golf & Country Club (the first golf Course in Poland post WWII, Gdansk Golf and Country Club and Amber Baltic Golf Club. The Union associates 51 golf clubs, whose members amount to over 2700 golfers with handicap cards (a sport licence equivalent) PGU HCP.

The main aims of the Union are: promotion, development and organisation of golf in Poland and representing and protection of interests of clubs associated in the union. PGU is responsible for development, implementation and supervision of the rules of golf issued by R&A Rules Ltd and translation into Polish per PGU order, as well as organising and setting rules of playing championship rank and other golf tournaments in Poland.

The Union is responsible for selection of the Polish national teams (of various age categories) from its members and submission of the teams to international tournaments.

The PGU became a member of the Polish Olympic Committee in 2011, mainly due to golf's re-introduction as an Olympic discipline from the 2016 Summer Olympics in Rio de Janeiro. The PGU is also a member of the International Golf Federation.

An official classification of amateur players who are members of the Polish Golf Union (PGU) and who have an up-to-date PGU handicap card is the PGU Rank.

== Presidents of the Polish Golf Union ==
- Piotr Kozłowski (up to 2000)
- Andrzej Person (2000–2002; 2002–2004)
- Piotr Mondalski (2004–2006; 2006–2010)
- Marek Michałowski (since 2010)

Polish Golf Union is the organiser of a series of Polish championship tournaments - Golf Masters Series. In Poland, there is also an active division of PGA – PGA Poland, which is to join PGU.
