= Mariusz Jurasik =

Polish handball player (born 1976)

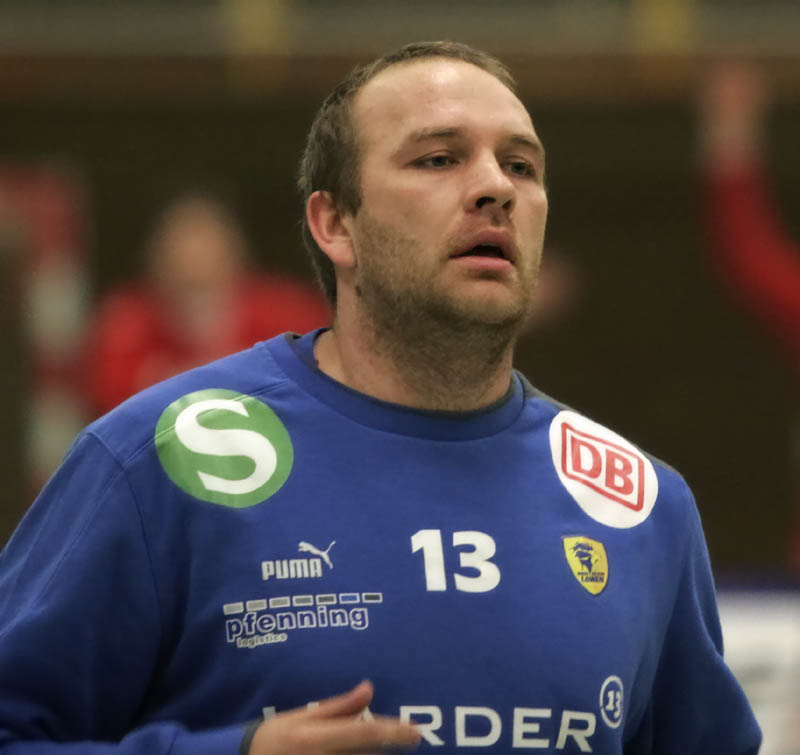

Personal information
- Nationality: Polish
- Born: 4 May 1976 (age 50) Żagań, Poland
- Height: 1.90 m (6 ft 3 in)

Sport
- Sport: Handball
- Position: Right Wing

Senior clubs
- Years: Team
- 1993–1996: Sobieski Żagań
- 1996–2001: Iskra Kielce
- 2001–2003: Wisła Płock
- 2003–2009: Rhein-Neckar Löwen
- 2009–2012: Vive Kielce
- 2012: El Jaish
- 2012–2016: NMC Górnik Zabrze
- 2016–2017: Pogoń Szczecin
National team
Years	Team	Apps	(Gls)
1997–2012	Poland	207	(704)
Medal record
World Championship
Silver medal – second place	2007 Germany
Bronze medal – third place	2009 Croatia

Mariusz Jurasik (born 4 May 1976) is a former Polish handball player who played for the Polish national team.

== Career ==
He received a silver medal with the Polish team at the 2007 World Men's Handball Championship. He participated at the 2008 Summer Olympics, where Poland finished fifth.
