= Krzysztof Lijewski =

Polish handball player (born 1983)

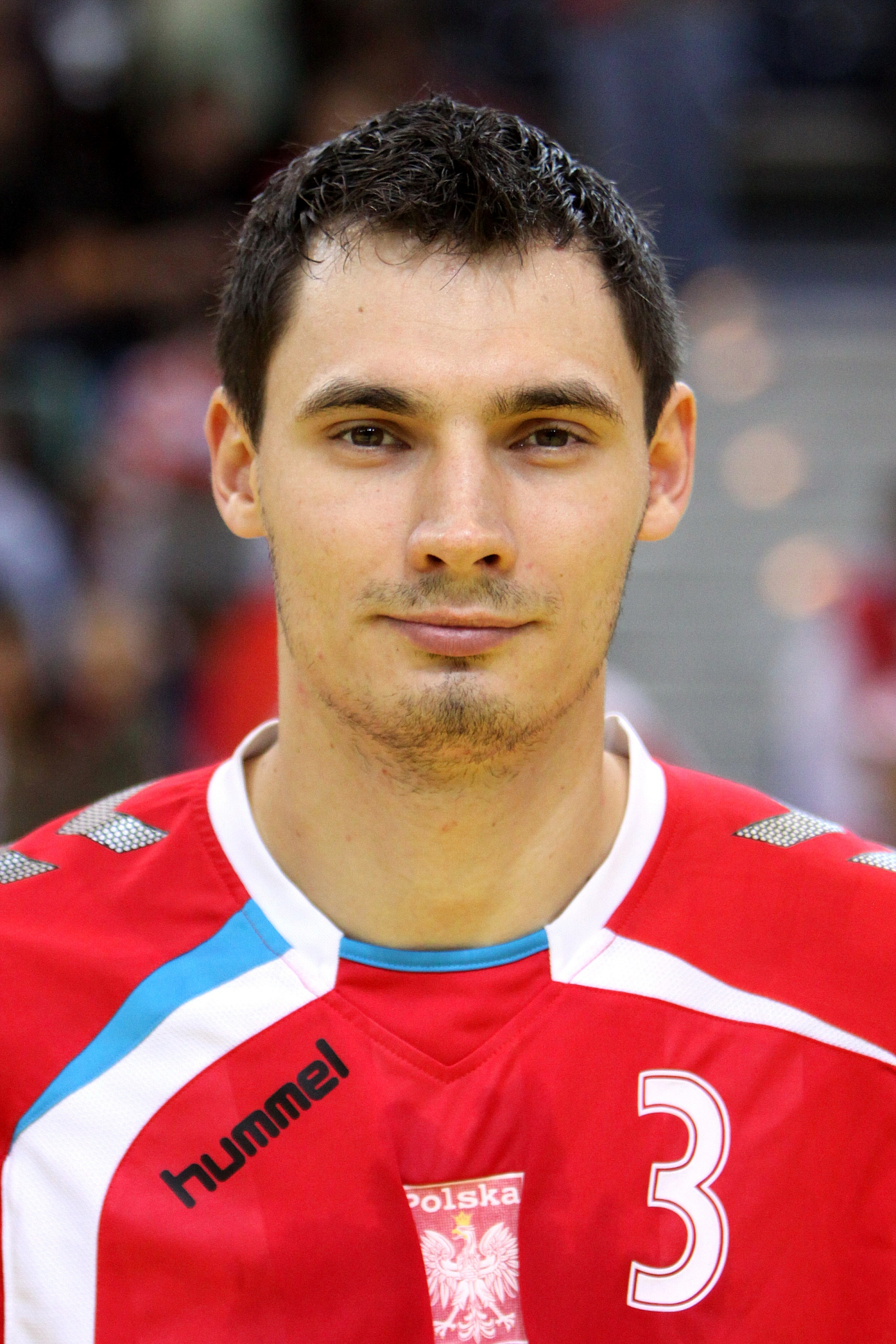

Personal information
- Nationality: Polish
- Born: 7 July 1983 (age 43) Ostrów Wielkopolski, Poland
- Height: 1.99 m (6 ft 6 in)

Sport
- Sport: Handball
- Position: Right back
- Current club: Barlinek Industria Kielce (head coach)

Senior clubs
- Years: Team
- 2000–2002: Ostrovia Ostrów Wielkopolski
- 2002–2005: Śląsk Wrocław
- 2005–2011: HSV Hamburg
- 2011–2012: Rhein-Neckar Löwen
- 2012–2021: Łomża Vive Kielce
National team
Years	Team	Apps	(Gls)
2003–2017	Poland	182	(435)

Teams managed
- 2020–2026: Barlinek Industria Kielce (assistant)
- 2026–: Barlinek Industria Kielce
Medal record
World Championship
Silver medal – second place	2007 Germany
Bronze medal – third place	2009 Croatia
Bronze medal – third place	2015 Qatar

Krzysztof Lijewski (born 7 July 1983) is a Polish former handball player and current coach, who is currently coaching Industria Kielce. He received a silver medal with the Polish team at the 2007 World Men's Handball Championship and a bronze medal at the 2009 World Men's Handball Championship in Croatia and at the 2015 World Men's Handball Championship in Qatar. He participated at the 2008 Summer Olympics, where Poland finished 5th and at the 2016 Summer Olympics, where Poland finished 4th.

His brother is Marcin Lijewski.

In 2021 he became the assistant player-coach of Industria Kielce under Talant Dujshebaev. In April 2026 he overtook the head coach position, when Dujshebaev left the team.

== Sporting achievements ==
=== State awards ===
- 2007 Gold Cross of Merit
- 2015 Knight's Cross of Polonia Restituta
