= Zbigniew Tłuczyński =

Polish handball player (born 1956)

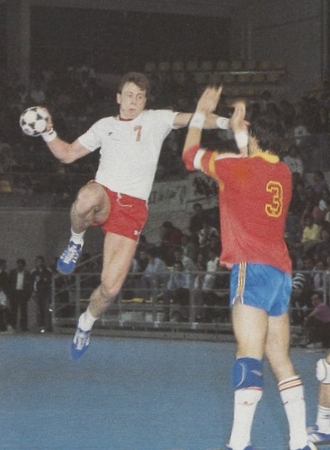
Tłuczyński at the 1989 B-World Championship

Zbigniew Stanisław Tłuczyński (born 16 February 1956 in Skierniewice) is a former Polish handball player and coach who competed in the 1980 Summer Olympics.

In 1980 he was part of the Polish team which finished seventh in the Olympic tournament. He played all six matches and scored 14 goals.

He also represented Poland at the 1982 and 1986 World Men's Handball Championship.

At club level he played for KS Kielce, Slask Wroclaw in Poland, VfL Fredenbeck and TuS Nettelstedt in Germany and Alpla HC Hard in Austria. In the 1988–89 season he was the topscorer in the handball-Bundesliga.

His children Tomasz and Maciej Tłuczyński are also handballers.
