= Grzegorz Tkaczyk =

Polish handball player (born 1980)

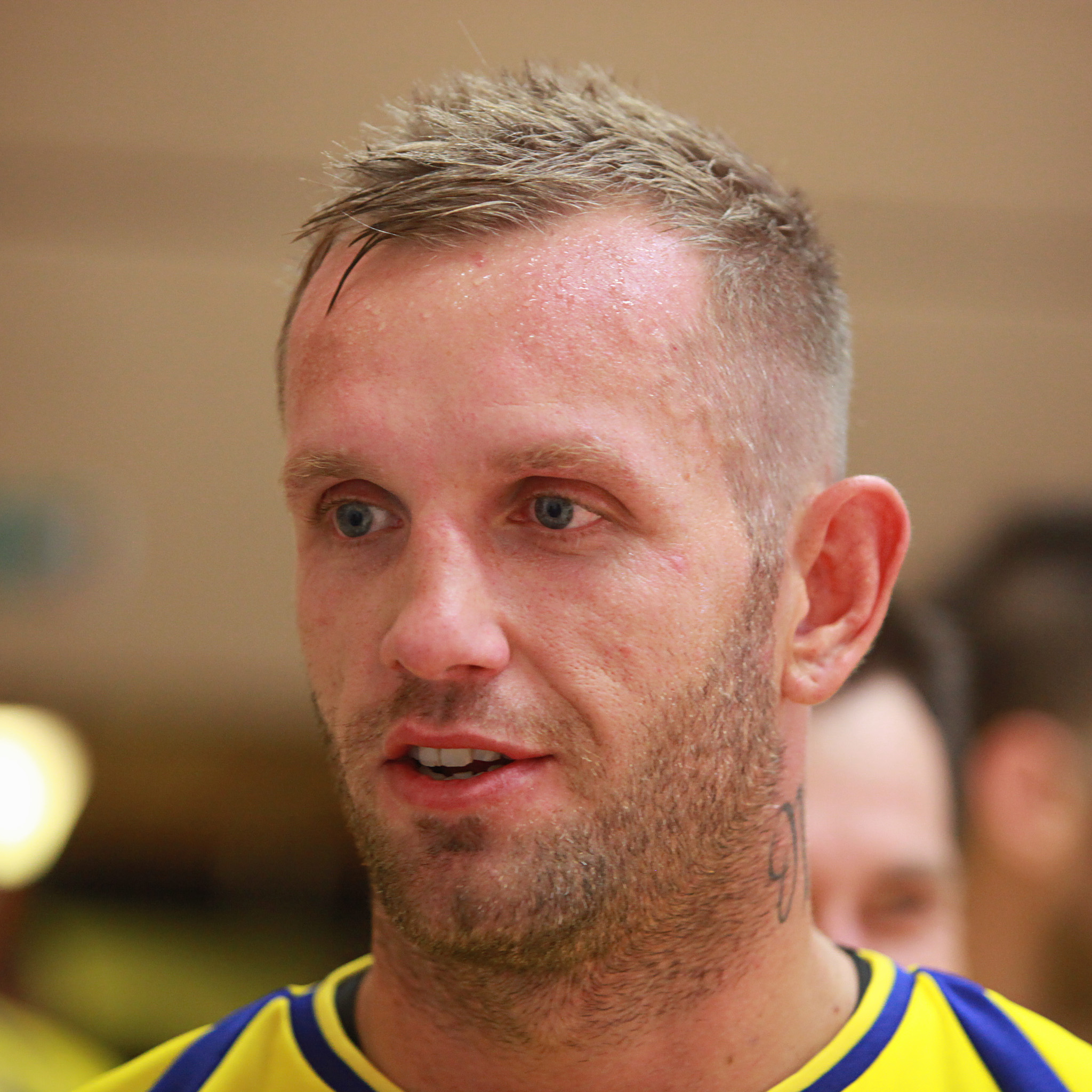

Personal information
- Full name: Grzegorz Tkaczyk
- Nationality: Polish
- Born: 22 December 1980 (age 45) Warsaw, Poland
- Height: 1.94 m (6 ft 4 in)

Sport
- Sport: Handball
- Position: Centre back

Senior clubs
- Years: Team
- 1990–2002: KS Warszawianka
- 2002–2007: SC Magdeburg
- 2007–2011: Rhein-Neckar Löwen
- 2011–2016: Vive Targi Kielce
National team
Years	Team	Apps	(Gls)
2000–2012	Poland	159	(549)
Medal record
World Championship
Silver medal – second place	2007 Germany

Grzegorz Tkaczyk (born 22 December 1980 in Warsaw) is a retired Polish handball player - member of Poland men's national handball team, participant of 2007 World Men's Handball Championship.

== Sporting achievements ==
=== State awards ===
Golden Cross of Merit in 2007.
