= Polish Volleyball Federation =

Polish sports governing body

Polish Volleyball Association
- Sport: Volleyball; Beach volleyball
- Jurisdiction: Poland
- Abbreviation: PZPS
- Founded: 1928
- Affiliation: FIVB
- Affiliation date: 1947
- Regional affiliation: CEV
- Affiliation date: 1963
- Headquarters: Warsaw
- Location: Poland
- President: Sebastian Świderski

Official website
- www.pzps.pl
- (Poland)

The Polish Volleyball Federation (Polish: Polski Związek Piłki Siatkowej, PZPS) is an organization founded in 1928 to govern the practice of Volleyball in Poland.

It organizes all the men's domestic competitions from professional to amateur as well as all women 's domestic championships from First tier to the lowest one, the PZPS Managed and rule over the men's and women's national teams from senior to all age group categories .

PZPS joined the FIVB in 1947.

== Provincial Volleyball Associations ==
N.	Official name	Headquarter	Website
1.	Dolnośląski Związek Piłki Siatkowej	Wrocław	www.dzps.pl
2.	Kujawsko-Pomorski Związek Piłki Siatkowej	Bydgoszcz	www.kpzps.pl/
3.	Lubuski Związek Piłki Siatkowej	Zielona Góra	www.lzps.pl
4.	Łódzki Związek Piłki Siatkowej	Łódź	www.siatka-lodzkie.pl
5.	Małopolski Związek Piłki Siatkowej	Kraków	www.mzps.pl
6.	Mazowiecko-Warszawski Związek Piłki Siatkowej	Warsaw	www.mwzps.pl
7.	Opolski Związek Piłki Siatkowej	Opole	www.ozps.pl
8.	Podkarpacki Wojewódzki Związek Piłki Siatkowej	Rzeszów	www.pwzps.p9.pl
9.	Podlaski Okręgowy Związek Piłki Siatkowej	Białystok	www.pozps.bialystok.pl
10.	Pomorski Wojewódzki Związek Piłki Siatkowej	Gdańsk	www.pwzps.org
11.	Śląski Związek Piłki Siatkowej	Katowice	www.szps.pl
12.	Świętokrzyski Związek Piłki Siatkowej	Kielce	www.szps.kielce.pl
13.	Warmińsko-Mazurski Związek Piłki Siatkowej	Olsztyn	www.wmzps.org
14.	Wielkopolski Związek Piłki Siatkowej	Poznań	www.wzps.poznan.pl
15.	Wojewódzki Związek Piłki Siatkowej w Lublinie	Lublin	www.wzps.lublin.pl
16.	Zachodniopomorski Związek Piłki Siatkowej	Szczecin	www.zzps.pl

== Presidents List ==
President	Duration
Eugeniusz Krotkiewski	1957
Tadeusz Brzósko	1957–1969
Zygmunt Najdowski	1969–1971
Stanisław Romański	1971–1978
Tadeusz Sąsara	1978–1988
Eryk Ippohorski-Lenkiewicz	1988–2001
Janusz Biesiada	2001–2004
Mirosław Przedpełski	2004–2015
Paweł Papke	2015–2016
Jacek Kasprzyk	2016–2021
Sebastian Świderski	Since 2021
