= Polish Handball Association =

Governing body for handball in Poland

Polish Handball Association Polish: Związek Piłki Ręcznej w Polsce ZPRP
- IOC nation: Republic of Poland (POL)
- Sport: Handball
- Other sports: Beach handball; Wheelchair handball
- Official website: www.zprp.pl

HISTORY
- Preceding organisations: Polski Związek Gier Sportowych (founded in 1928); Polski Związek Piłki Ręcznej (founded in 1936)
- Year of formation: 1956; 70 years ago

AFFILIATIONS
- International federation: International Handball Federation (IHF)
- IHF member since: 1946; 80 years ago
- Continental association: European Handball Federation
- National Olympic Committee: Polish Olympic Committee

GOVERNING BODY
- President: Sławomir Szmal
- Address: Puławska Street 300 Warsaw
- Country: Poland

FINANCE
- Sponsors: Suzuki; Orlen; Joma; Polaris; Luxmed

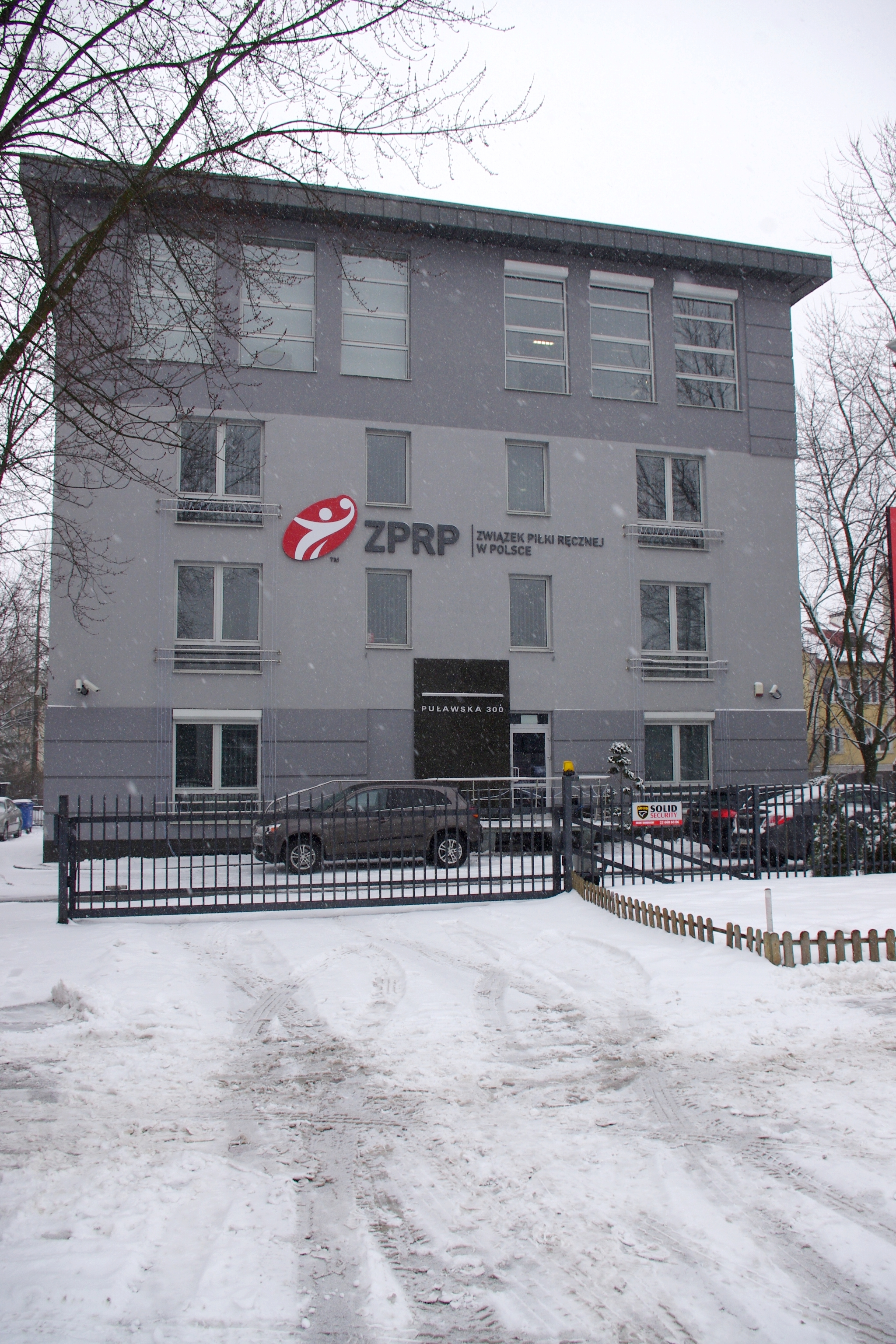
Headquarters of the Polish Handball Federation

The Polish Handball Association (Polish: Związek Piłki Ręcznej w Polsce, ZPRP) is the national handball association in Poland.

ZPRP is a member of the European Handball Federation (EHF), the International Handball Federation (IHF) and the Polish Olympic Committee.
