= 2016 European Men's Handball Championship squads =

This article displays the squads for the 2016 European Men's Handball Championship. Each team consists of up to 28 players, of whom 16 may be fielded for each match.

Age, club, caps and goals as of 15 January 2016.

== Group A ==
=== France ===
A 20-player squad was announced on 26 December 2015. A 17-player squad was announced on 12 January 2016.

Head coach: Claude Onesta

No.	Pos.	Name	Date of birth (age)	Height	App.	Goals	Club
5	RB	Nedim Remili	18 July 1995 (aged 20)	1.95 m	0	0	(France) US Créteil
6	LW/LB	Olivier Nyokas	28 June 1986 (aged 29)	1.88 m	3	5	(Germany) HBW Balingen-Weilstetten
8	CB	Daniel Narcisse	16 December 1979 (aged 36)	1.89 m	277	851	(France) Paris Saint-Germain
11	LW	Samuel Honrubia	5 July 1986 (aged 29)	1.80 m	77	198	(France) Paris Saint-Germain
12	GK	Vincent Gérard	16 December 1986 (aged 29)	1.88 m	23	0	(France) Montpellier
13	CB	Nikola Karabatić	11 April 1984 (aged 31)	1.96 m	249	1019	(France) Paris Saint-Germain
14	LW/CB	Kentin Mahé	22 May 1991 (aged 24)	1.86 m	39	81	(Germany) SG Flensburg-Handewitt
16	GK	Thierry Omeyer	2 November 1976 (aged 39)	1.92 m	325	1	(France) Paris Saint-Germain
19	RW	Luc Abalo	6 September 1984 (aged 31)	1.82 m	193	640	(France) Paris Saint-Germain
20	P	Cédric Sorhaindo	7 June 1984 (aged 31)	1.92 m	147	297	(Spain) FC Barcelona
21	LW	Michaël Guigou	28 January 1982 (aged 33)	1.79 m	215	761	(France) Montpellier
22	P	Luka Karabatić	19 April 1988 (aged 27)	2.02 m	39	41	(France) Paris Saint-Germain
23	P	Ludovic Fabregas	1 July 1996 (aged 19)	1.98 m	5	4	(France) Montpellier
25	LB	Théo Derot	17 June 1992 (aged 23)	1.93 m	7	4	(France) HBC Nantes
27	RB	Adrien Dipanda	3 May 1988 (aged 27)	2.02 m	5	10	(France) Saint-Raphaël
28	RB/RW	Valentin Porte	7 September 1990 (aged 25)	1.90 m	45	106	(France) Fenix Toulouse
29	RB/RW	Benoît Kounkoud	19 February 1997 (aged 18)	1.88 m	2	2	(France) Paris Saint-Germain

=== Macedonia ===
A 23-player squad was announced on 11 December 2015. The final squad was announced on 11 January 2016.

Head coach: Ivica Obrvan

No.	Pos.	Name	Date of birth (age)	Height	App.	Goals	Club
3	LW	Dejan Manaskov	26 August 1992 (aged 23)	1.80 m	32	85	(North Macedonia) Vardar
5	P	Stojanče Stoilov	30 April 1987 (aged 28)	1.92 m	26	48	(North Macedonia) Vardar
7	RB	Kiril Lazarov	10 May 1980 (aged 35)	1.93 m	114	935	(Spain) FC Barcelona
8	RB	Vlatko Mitkov	16 August 1981 (aged 34)	1.92 m	85	73	(Austria) UHK Krems
9	CB	Aco Jonovski	29 December 1980 (aged 35)	1.97 m	70	68	(Germany) Bergischer HC
10	GK	Daniel Dupjačanec	15 July 1983 (aged 32)	1.89 m	2	0	(North Macedonia) Metalurg
13	CB	Filip Mirkulovski	14 September 1983 (aged 32)	1.89 m	120	301	(Germany) HSG Wetzlar
14	LB	Velko Markoski	5 April 1986 (aged 29)	1.94 m	38	47	(Croatia) Zagreb
16	GK	Borko Ristovski	2 November 1982 (aged 33)	1.90 m	118	3	(Germany) Rhein-Neckar Löwen
17	P	Nikola Markoski	22 May 1990 (aged 25)	1.96 m	17	10	(North Macedonia) Rabotnički
18	CB	Naumče Mojsovski	17 June 1980 (aged 35)	1.87 m	101	130	(Romania) CSM București
21	CB	Nemanja Pribak	26 March 1984 (aged 31)	1.90 m	13	17	(Turkey) Beşiktaş
22	RW	Goce Georgievski	12 February 1987 (aged 28)	1.85 m	37	59	(France) Fenix Toulouse
23	LB	Filip Lazarov	21 April 1985 (aged 30)	1.97 m	42	110	(North Macedonia) Vardar
26	LW	Goce Ojleski	10 October 1989 (aged 26)	1.88 m	21	17	(Romania) Odorheiu Secuiesc
27	LB	Filip Kuzmanovski	3 July 1996 (aged 19)	1.98 m	4	2	(North Macedonia) Metalurg
33	P	Žarko Peševski	11 April 1991 (aged 24)	1.95 m	6	14	(North Macedonia) Metalurg

=== Poland ===
A 23-player squad was announced on 26 December 2015. It was reduced to 21 on 6 January 2016. The final squad was announced on 14 January 2016.

Head coach: Michael Biegler

No.	Pos.	Name	Date of birth (age)	Height	App.	Goals	Club
1	GK	Sławomir Szmal	2 October 1978 (aged 37)	1.90 m	262	2	(Poland) Vive Targi Kielce
3	RB	Krzysztof Lijewski	7 July 1983 (aged 32)	1.98 m	157	370	(Poland) Vive Targi Kielce
6	LW	Przemysław Krajewski	20 January 1987 (aged 28)	1.84 m	49	72	(Poland) Azoty-Puławy
7	RW	Robert Orzechowski	20 November 1989 (aged 26)	1.89 m	79	106	(Poland) Azoty-Puławy
8	LB	Karol Bielecki	23 January 1982 (aged 33)	2.02 m	226	813	(Poland) Vive Targi Kielce
11	LW	Adam Wiśniewski	24 October 1980 (aged 35)	1.92 m	127	272	(Poland) Wisła Płock
13	P	Bartosz Jurecki	31 January 1979 (aged 36)	1.93 m	217	700	(Germany) SC Magdeburg
15	LB	Michał Jurecki	27 October 1984 (aged 31)	2.02 m	170	462	(Poland) Vive Targi Kielce
16	GK	Piotr Wyszomirski	6 January 1988 (aged 28)	1.93 m	89	0	(Hungary) MOL-Pick Szeged
17	CB	Bartosz Konitz	30 December 1984 (aged 31)	1.95 m	0	0	(Poland) Wisła Płock
18	P	Piotr Grabarczyk	31 October 1982 (aged 33)	2.00 m	101	45	(Germany) HSV Hamburg
19	CB	Rafał Gliński	29 December 1982 (aged 33)	1.81 m	44	42	(Poland) Górnik Zabrze
21	CB	Piotr Masłowski	20 February 1988 (aged 27)	1.92 m	27	19	(Poland) Azoty-Puławy
23	P	Kamil Syprzak	23 July 1991 (aged 24)	2.08 m	69	123	(Spain) FC Barcelona
26	RW	Michał Daszek	27 June 1992 (aged 23)	1.80 m	36	61	(Poland) Wisła Płock
28	P	Maciej Gębala	10 January 1994 (aged 22)	2.00 m	0	0	(Germany) SC Magdeburg
29	RW	Jakub Łucak	18 September 1989 (aged 26)	1.81 m	16	28	(Poland) Śląsk Wrocław
45	RB	Michał Szyba	18 March 1988 (aged 27)	1.96 m	44	60	(Slovenia) Gorenje
49	LB	Piotr Chrapkowski	24 March 1988 (aged 27)	2.03 m	53	102	(Poland) Vive Targi Kielce

=== Serbia ===
A 19-player squad was announced on 19 December 2015.

Head coach: Dejan Perić

No.	Pos.	Name	Date of birth (age)	Height	App.	Goals	Club
1	GK	Slaviša Đukanović	3 May 1979 (aged 36)	1.90 m	12	0	(France) Saint-Raphaël
3	P	Miljan Pušica	30 June 1991 (aged 24)	2.01 m	18	10	(Poland) Wisła Płock
5	CB	Žarko Šešum	16 June 1986 (aged 29)	1.96 m	133	337	(Germany) Frisch Auf Göppingen
7	LW	Ivan Nikčević	11 February 1981 (aged 34)	1.81 m	135	491	(Poland) Wisła Płock
8	LW	Filip Marjanović	10 February 1989 (aged 26)	1.89 m	23	17	(Serbia) Vojvodina
10	RW	Darko Ðukić	11 December 1994 (aged 21)	1.91 m	20	63	(Turkey) Beşiktaş
12	GK	Darko Stanić	8 October 1978 (aged 37)	1.92 m	103	0	(Qatar) El Jaish
13	CB	Petar Nenadić	28 June 1986 (aged 29)	1.98 m	67	167	(Germany) Füchse Berlin
17	RB	Novak Bošković	23 May 1989 (aged 26)	1.91 m	5	10	(Israel) MaccabI Tel Aviv
20	LB	Momir Rnić	1 November 1987 (aged 28)	1.97 m	87	152	(Germany) MT Melsungen
22	P	Bojan Beljanski	22 June 1986 (aged 29)	2.00 m	54	56	(Austria) Bregenz
25	RB	Nemanja Zelenović	27 February 1990 (aged 25)	1.94 m	45	117	(Germany) SC Magdeburg
29	LB	Ilija Abutović	2 August 1988 (aged 27)	2.02 m	21	24	(North Macedonia) Vardar
33	P	Mijajlo Marsenić	9 March 1993 (aged 22)	2.03 m	48	71	(North Macedonia) Vardar
36	RB	Miloš Orbović	2 November 1993 (aged 22)	1.93 m	6	6	(Serbia) Vojvodina
82	LB	Uroš Elezović	28 January 1982 (aged 33)	1.94 m	6	7	(Qatar) Lekhwiya
85	GK	Dragan Marjanac	26 February 1985 (aged 30)	1.91 m	78	1	(Switzerland) BSV Bern Muri

== Group B ==
=== Belarus ===
An 18-player squad was announced on 10 December 2015, which was reduced to 17 on 25 December 2015. 18 players made the journey to Poland.

Head coach: Yuri Shevtsov

No.	Pos.	Name	Date of birth (age)	Height	App.	Goals	Club
1	GK	Aliaksei Kishou	23 September 1986 (aged 29)	1.92 m	35	1	(Austria) ULZ Schwaz
2	LW	Ivan Brouka	20 April 1980 (aged 35)	1.78 m	155	539	(Belarus) SKA Minsk
3	LB	Uladzislau Kulesh	28 May 1996 (aged 19)	2.00 m	0	0	(Belarus) SKA Minsk
4	P	Maxim Babichev	7 March 1986 (aged 29)	2.00 m	120	206	(Belarus) Meshkov Brest
5	LB	Aliaksei Khadkevich	14 January 1994 (aged 22)	1.91 m	5	6	(Belarus) SKA Minsk
6	RB	Viktar Zaitsau	27 August 1992 (aged 23)	1.95 m	30	30	(Russia) Saint Petersburg
10	CB	Barys Pukhouski	3 January 1987 (aged 29)	1.84 m	137	586	(Ukraine) Motor Zaporizhzhia
14	LB	Siarhei Rutenka	29 August 1981 (aged 34)	1.98 m	65	421	free agent
16	GK	Viachaslau Saldatsenka	23 August 1994 (aged 21)	1.88 m	0	0	(Belarus) SKA Minsk
17	CB	Dzmitry Nikulenkau	12 July 1984 (aged 31)	1.88 m	84	155	(Belarus) Meshkov Brest
18	RB	Siarhei Shylovich	16 May 1986 (aged 29)	1.95 m	99	304	(Belarus) Meshkov Brest
19	RW	Aliaksandr Patsykailik	8 March 1990 (aged 25)	1.90 m	0	0	(Belarus) SKA Minsk
23	LW	Andrei Yurynok	21 September 1996 (aged 19)	1.98 m	5	3	(Belarus) SKA Minsk
24	RW	Maksim Baranau	11 April 1988 (aged 27)	1.88 m	97	228	(Belarus) Meshkov Brest
25	LB	Anton Prakapenia	26 September 1988 (aged 27)	1.95 m	21	56	(Austria) ULZ Schwaz
50	P	Artsiom Karalek	20 February 1996 (aged 19)	1.90 m	4	9	(Belarus) SKA Minsk
55	P	Aliaksandr Tsitou	28 October 1986 (aged 29)	1.90 m	123	128	(Belarus) Masheka Mogilev

=== Croatia ===
A 28-player squad was announced on 28 November 2015. It was reduced to 20 on 30 December 2015. On 4 January 2016, Domagoj Pavlović and Mario Vuglač were ruled out due to an injury and Šime Ivić was added to the squad. A 17-player squad was announced on 12 January 2016.

Head coach: Željko Babić

No.	Pos.	Name	Date of birth (age)	Height	App.	Goals	Club
1	GK	Ivan Stevanović	18 May 1982 (aged 33)	1.93 m	15	0	(Croatia) Zagreb
3	P	Marino Marić	1 June 1990 (aged 25)	1.96 m	32	59	(Germany) MT Melsungen
5	CB	Domagoj Duvnjak	1 June 1988 (aged 27)	1.97 m	153	497	(Germany) THW Kiel
8	RB	Marko Kopljar	12 February 1986 (aged 29)	2.10 m	124	254	(Spain) FC Barcelona
10	LB	Jakov Gojun	18 April 1986 (aged 29)	2.04 m	125	71	(Germany) Füchse Berlin
13	RW	Zlatko Horvat	25 September 1984 (aged 31)	1.79 m	115	332	(Croatia) Zagreb
18	CB	Igor Karačić	2 November 1988 (aged 27)	1.89 m	27	71	(North Macedonia) Vardar
21	P	Krešimir Kozina	25 June 1990 (aged 25)	1.96 m	2	0	(Germany) SG Flensburg-Handewitt
25	GK	Mirko Alilović	15 September 1985 (aged 30)	2.00 m	152	0	(Hungary) MVM Veszprém
26	LW	Manuel Štrlek	1 December 1988 (aged 27)	1.81 m	99	318	(Poland) Vive Targi Kielce
27	RW	Ivan Čupić	27 March 1986 (aged 29)	1.78 m	112	440	(Poland) Vive Targi Kielce
29	LW	Antonio Kovačević	21 May 1987 (aged 28)	1.90 m	4	4	(Croatia) Zagreb
30	LB	Marko Mamić	6 March 1994 (aged 21)	2.00 m	4	3	(France) Dunkerque
31	RB	Luka Šebetić	26 May 1994 (aged 21)	1.98 m	2	3	(Croatia) Zagreb
32	LB	Ivan Slišković	23 October 1991 (aged 24)	1.97 m	37	87	(Hungary) MVM Veszprém
33	CB	Luka Cindrić	5 July 1993 (aged 22)	1.82 m	7	18	(North Macedonia) Vardar
34	P	Ilija Brozović	26 May 1991 (aged 24)	1.95 m	15	12	(Germany) THW Kiel

=== Iceland ===
A 21-player squad was announced on 21 December 2015. The list was reduced to 18 on 7 January and 17 on 12 January 2016.

Head coach: Aron Kristjánsson

No.	Pos.	Name	Date of birth (age)	Height	App.	Goals	Club
1	GK	Björgvin Páll Gústavsson	24 May 1985 (aged 30)	1.93 m	171	3	(Germany) Bergischer HC
2	P	Vignir Svavarsson	20 June 1980 (aged 35)	1.94 m	227	255	(Denmark) Midtjylland
3	P	Kári Kristjánsson	28 October 1984 (aged 31)	1.98 m	106	123	(Iceland) ÍBV
4	LB	Aron Pálmarsson	19 July 1990 (aged 25)	1.93 m	102	395	(Hungary) MVM Veszprém
5	RB	Rúnar Kárason	24 May 1988 (aged 27)	1.96 m	62	129	(Germany) TSV Hannover-Burgdorf
6	RB	Ásgeir Örn Hallgrímsson	17 February 1984 (aged 31)	1.91 m	227	388	(France) USAM Nîmes
7	LB	Arnór Atlason	23 July 1984 (aged 31)	1.91 m	175	404	(France) Saint-Raphaël
9	LW	Guðjón Valur Sigurðsson	8 August 1979 (aged 36)	1.87 m	319	1690	(Spain) FC Barcelona
10	CB	Snorri Steinn Guðjónsson	17 October 1981 (aged 34)	1.87 m	252	835	(France) USAM Nîmes
12	GK	Aron Rafn Eðvarðsson	1 September 1989 (aged 26)	2.02 m	58	4	(Denmark) Aalborg
13	LB	Ólafur Guðmundsson	13 May 1990 (aged 25)	1.94 m	61	57	(Sweden) IFK Kristianstad
14	RW	Arnór Þór Gunnarsson	23 October 1987 (aged 28)	1.81 m	54	115	(Germany) Bergischer HC
15	RB	Alexander Petersson	2 July 1980 (aged 35)	1.86 m	170	682	(Germany) Rhein-Neckar Löwen
18	P	Róbert Gunnarsson	22 May 1980 (aged 35)	1.90 m	269	762	(France) Paris Saint-Germain
22	LW	Stefán Rafn Sigurmannsson	19 May 1990 (aged 25)	1.96 m	49	58	(Germany) Rhein-Neckar Löwen
26	P	Bjarki Már Gunnarsson	10 August 1988 (aged 27)	2.01 m	41	10	(Germany) EHV Aue
28	CB	Guðmundur Hólmar Helgason	5 August 1992 (aged 23)	1.92 m	7	4	(Iceland) Valur

=== Norway ===
An 18-player squad was announced on 11 December 2015.

Head coach: Christian Berge

No.	Pos.	Name	Date of birth (age)	Height	App.	Goals	Club
5	CB	Sander Sagosen	14 September 1995 (aged 20)	1.95 m	27	68	(Denmark) Aalborg
6	RW	Thomas Kristensen	2 May 1990 (aged 25)	1.96 m	23	22	(Germany) Frisch Auf Göppingen
7	P	Joakim Hykkerud	10 February 1986 (aged 29)	1.94 m	37	41	(Germany) TSV Hannover-Burgdorf
8	P	Bjarte Myrhol	29 May 1982 (aged 33)	1.94 m	171	495	(Denmark) Skjern
9	P	Petter Øverby	26 March 1992 (aged 23)	1.93 m	18	9	(Norway) Elverum
11	LB	Erlend Mamelund	1 May 1984 (aged 31)	1.97 m	124	352	(Germany) THW Kiel
12	GK	Ole Erevik	9 January 1981 (aged 35)	1.96 m	163	0	(France) Pays d’Aix UC
15	RB	Kent Tønnesen	5 June 1991 (aged 24)	1.96 m	52	108	(Germany) Füchse Berlin
16	GK	Espen Christensen	17 June 1985 (aged 30)	1.90 m	38	0	(Denmark) GOG Gudme
17	LW	Magnus Jøndal	7 February 1988 (aged 27)	1.87 m	68	145	(Norway) ØIF Arendal
19	RW	Kristian Bjørnsen	10 January 1989 (aged 27)	1.91 m	45	192	(Sweden) IFK Kristianstad
20	LW	André Lindboe	3 November 1988 (aged 27)	1.78 m	30	82	(Norway) Elverum
21	P	Magnus Gullerud	13 November 1991 (aged 24)	1.96 m	54	71	(Denmark) SønderjyskE
24	CB	Christian O'Sullivan	22 August 1991 (aged 24)	1.90 m	43	51	(Sweden) IFK Kristianstad
27	RB	Harald Reinkind	17 August 1992 (aged 23)	1.96 m	47	109	(Germany) Rhein-Neckar Löwen
89	LB	Espen Lie Hansen	1 March 1989 (aged 26)	1.96 m	90	304	(Austria) Bregenz

== Group C ==
=== Germany ===
The squad was announced on 11 December 2015. Uwe Gensheimer and Patrick Groetzki were ruled out due to injuries on 19 and 25 December 2015. Michael Allendorf would miss the tournament because of an injury, announced on 2 January 2016. Kai Häfner and Julius Kühn were added on 8 and 11 January 2016. The final squad was announced on 14 January 2016.

Head coach: Dagur Sigurðsson

No.	Pos.	Name	Date of birth (age)	Height	App.	Goals	Club
5	RW	Johannes Sellin	31 December 1990 (aged 25)	1.87 m	42	96	(Germany) MT Melsungen
6	LB	Finn Lemke	30 April 1992 (aged 23)	2.10 m	17	14	(Germany) TBV Lemgo
9	RW	Tobias Reichmann	27 May 1988 (aged 27)	1.88 m	34	75	(Poland) Vive Targi Kielce
10	RB	Fabian Wiede	8 February 1994 (aged 21)	1.94 m	25	41	(Germany) Füchse Berlin
13	P	Hendrik Pekeler	2 July 1991 (aged 24)	2.03 m	40	57	(Germany) Rhein-Neckar Löwen
16	GK	Carsten Lichtlein	4 November 1980 (aged 35)	2.02 m	204	1	(Germany) VfL Gummersbach
17	RB	Steffen Weinhold	19 July 1986 (aged 29)	1.91 m	81	214	(Germany) THW Kiel
19	CB	Martin Strobel	5 June 1986 (aged 29)	1.89 m	112	139	(Germany) HBW Balingen-Weilstetten
21	P	Erik Schmidt	28 December 1992 (aged 23)	2.04 m	26	25	(Germany) TSG Friesenheim
23	LB	Steffen Fäth	4 April 1990 (aged 25)	1.95 m	28	46	(Germany) HSG Wetzlar
25	RB	Kai Häfner	10 July 1989 (aged 26)	1.92 m	23	31	(Germany) TSV Hannover-Burgdorf
33	GK	Andreas Wolff	3 March 1991 (aged 24)	1.98 m	17	1	(Germany) HSG Wetzlar
34	LW	Rune Dahmke	10 April 1993 (aged 22)	1.89 m	6	13	(Germany) THW Kiel
35	LB	Julius Kühn	1 April 1993 (aged 22)	1.98 m	2	3	(Germany) VfL Gummersbach
40	CB	Simon Ernst	2 April 1994 (aged 21)	1.95 m	14	14	(Germany) VfL Gummersbach
43	CB	Niclas Pieczkowski	28 December 1989 (aged 26)	1.93 m	9	16	(Germany) TuS Nettelstedt-Lübbecke
47	LB	Christian Dissinger	15 November 1991 (aged 24)	2.04 m	7	20	(Germany) THW Kiel
48	P	Jannik Kohlbacher	19 July 1995 (aged 20)	1.93 m	8	23	(Germany) HSG Wetzlar

=== Slovenia ===
A 21-player squad was announced on 23 December 2015. Klemen Ferlin was replaced by Urban Lesjak on 26 December 2015 due to an injury. The final squad was announced on 12 January 2016.

Head coach: Veselin Vujović

No.	Pos.	Name	Date of birth (age)	Height	App.	Goals	Club
1	GK	Matevž Skok	2 September 1986 (aged 29)	1.88 m	49	0	(Germany) TuS Nettelstedt-Lübbecke
3	P	Blaž Blagotinšek	17 January 1994 (aged 21)	2.02 m	17	13	(Slovenia) Celje
6	RW	Gašper Marguč	20 August 1990 (aged 25)	1.80 m	57	191	(Hungary) MVM Veszprém
7	RB	Vid Kavtičnik	24 May 1984 (aged 31)	1.91 m	151	422	(France) Montpellier
12	GK	Gorazd Škof	11 July 1977 (aged 38)	1.88 m	172	0	(France) HBC Nantes
13	LW	Darko Cingesar	25 July 1990 (aged 25)	1.87 m	17	22	(Slovenia) Maribor Branik
14	LB	Sebastian Skube	3 April 1987 (aged 28)	1.89 m	115	263	(Denmark) Bjerringbro-Silkeborg
15	P	Vid Poteko	4 May 1991 (aged 24)	1.94 m	14	10	(Slovenia) Celje
18	RB	David Miklavčič	29 January 1983 (aged 32)	1.96 m	85	132	Tremblay-en-France
20	LW	Luka Žvižej	9 December 1980 (aged 35)	1.85 m	241	696	(Slovenia) Celje
22	P	Matej Gaber	22 July 1991 (aged 24)	1.97 m	76	79	(France) Montpellier
23	CB	Uroš Zorman	9 January 1980 (aged 36)	1.90 m	210	499	(Poland) Vive Targi Kielce
32	CB	Miha Zarabec	21 October 1991 (aged 24)	1.77 m	6	14	(Slovenia) Celje
44	CB	Dean Bombač	4 April 1989 (aged 26)	1.89 m	52	76	(Hungary) MOL-Pick Szeged
50	RW	Dragan Gajić	21 July 1984 (aged 31)	1.88 m	148	633	(France) Montpellier
51	LB	Borut Mačkovšek	11 September 1992 (aged 23)	2.04 m	53	114	(Germany) ThSV Eisenach

=== Spain ===
An 18-player squad was announced on 27 December 2015.

Head coach: Manolo Cadenas

No.	Pos.	Name	Date of birth (age)	Height	App.	Goals	Club
3	RB	Eduardo Gurbindo	8 November 1987 (aged 28)	1.95 m	68	86	(Spain) FC Barcelona
5	RB	Jorge Maqueda	6 February 1988 (aged 27)	1.97 m	105	254	(North Macedonia) Vardar
8	RW	Víctor Tomás	15 February 1985 (aged 30)	1.78 m	147	476	(Spain) FC Barcelona
9	CB	Raúl Entrerríos	12 February 1981 (aged 34)	1.93 m	200	434	(Spain) FC Barcelona
13	P	Julen Aguinagalde	8 December 1982 (aged 33)	1.95 m	133	364	(Poland) Vive Targi Kielce
15	LW	Cristian Ugalde	19 October 1987 (aged 28)	1.87 m	117	262	(Hungary) MVM Veszprém
16	GK	Arpad Sterbik	20 November 1979 (aged 36)	2.00 m	62	0	(North Macedonia) Vardar
21	CB	Joan Cañellas	30 September 1986 (aged 29)	1.98 m	120	341	(Germany) THW Kiel
24	LB	Viran Morros	15 December 1983 (aged 32)	1.99 m	155	142	(Spain) FC Barcelona
26	LB	Antonio García Robledo	6 March 1984 (aged 31)	1.91 m	63	118	(Hungary) MOL-Pick Szeged
27	P	Rafael Baena González	7 November 1982 (aged 33)	1.91 m	10	28	(Germany) Rhein-Neckar Löwen
28	LW	Valero Rivera Folch	22 February 1985 (aged 30)	1.85 m	61	210	(France) HBC Nantes
30	P	Gedeón Guardiola	1 October 1984 (aged 31)	2.00 m	79	103	(Germany) Rhein-Neckar Löwen
33	GK	Gonzalo Pérez de Vargas	10 January 1991 (aged 25)	1.89 m	43	0	(Spain) FC Barcelona
35	CB	Niko Mindegía	19 July 1988 (aged 27)	1.84 m	15	22	(Hungary) MOL-Pick Szeged
38	CB	Juan del Arco	29 November 1991 (aged 24)	1.90 m	4	15	(Qatar) El Jaish
40	RB	Alex Dujshebaev	17 December 1992 (aged 23)	1.87 m	25	43	(North Macedonia) Vardar

=== Sweden ===
The squad was announced on 18 December 2015.

Head coach: Ola Lindgren and Staffan Olsson

No.	Pos.	Name	Date of birth (age)	Height	App.	Goals	Club
1	GK	Mattias Andersson	29 March 1978 (aged 37)	1.85 m	129	0	(Germany) SG Flensburg-Handewitt
4	CB	Markus Olsson	31 March 1990 (aged 25)	1.88 m	36	90	(Denmark) Skjern
5	RB	Linus Persson	16 April 1993 (aged 22)	1.90 m	7	4	(Sweden) HK Malmö
6	LW	Jonas Källman	17 July 1981 (aged 34)	2.00 m	209	607	(Hungary) MOL-Pick Szeged
9	LW	Jerry Tollbring	13 September 1995 (aged 20)	1.82 m	0	0	(Sweden) IFK Kristianstad
10	RW	Niclas Ekberg	23 December 1988 (aged 27)	1.91 m	125	515	(Germany) THW Kiel
11	LB	Lukas Nilsson	16 November 1996 (aged 19)	1.92 m	8	21	(Sweden) Ystads IF
14	CB	Jesper Konradsson	4 June 1994 (aged 21)	1.84 m	11	19	(Sweden) Alingsås HK
18	P	Tobias Karlsson	4 June 1981 (aged 34)	1.96 m	161	81	(Germany) SG Flensburg-Handewitt
19	RB	Johan Jakobsson	12 February 1987 (aged 28)	1.95 m	93	181	(Germany) SG Flensburg-Handewitt
20	GK	Mikael Appelgren	6 September 1989 (aged 26)	1.91 m	25	0	(Germany) Rhein-Neckar Löwen
24	LW	Fredrik Petersen	27 August 1983 (aged 32)	1.88 m	138	399	(Germany) Füchse Berlin
28	LB	Philip Stenmalm	3 March 1992 (aged 23)	1.98 m	16	24	(Spain) Logroño
29	RB	Andreas Cederholm	4 May 1990 (aged 25)	1.86 m	25	54	(Sweden) IFK Kristianstad
31	LB	Viktor Östlund	19 January 1992 (aged 23)	1.98 m	29	70	(Sweden) Eskilstuna Guif
32	RW	Mattias Zachrisson	22 August 1990 (aged 25)	1.79 m	64	106	(Germany) Füchse Berlin
35	P	Andreas Nilsson	12 April 1990 (aged 25)	1.97 m	85	199	(Hungary) MVM Veszprém
36	P	Jesper Nielsen	30 August 1989 (aged 26)	2.00 m	54	59	(Germany) Füchse Berlin

== Group D ==
=== Denmark ===
An 18-player squad was announced on 17 December 2015. Alexander Lynggaard and Klaus Thomsen were added on 28 December 2015, due to an injury to Rene Toft Hansen. Lasse Andersson was ruled out because of an injury on 30 December 2015.

Head coach: Guðmundur Guðmundsson

No.	Pos.	Name	Date of birth (age)	Height	App.	Goals	Club
1	GK	Niklas Landin Jacobsen	19 December 1988 (aged 27)	2.01 m	130	1	(Germany) THW Kiel
2	P	Alexander Lynggaard	27 March 1990 (aged 25)	2.00 m	7	7	(France) Saint-Raphaël
3	RB	Mads Christiansen	3 May 1986 (aged 29)	1.94 m	95	210	(Denmark) Bjerringbro-Silkeborg
5	CB	Mads Mensah Larsen	12 August 1991 (aged 24)	1.88 m	54	122	(Germany) Rhein-Neckar Löwen
6	LW	Casper Ulrich Mortensen	14 December 1989 (aged 26)	1.90 m	60	184	(Germany) HSV Hamburg
7	LW	Anders Eggert	14 May 1982 (aged 33)	1.79 m	146	535	(Germany) SG Flensburg-Handewitt
11	CB	Rasmus Lauge Schmidt	20 June 1991 (aged 24)	1.93 m	73	126	(Germany) SG Flensburg-Handewitt
15	P	Jesper Nøddesbo	23 October 1980 (aged 35)	1.99 m	188	395	(Spain) FC Barcelona
17	RW	Lasse Svan Hansen	31 August 1983 (aged 32)	1.84 m	142	286	(Germany) SG Flensburg-Handewitt
18	RW	Hans Lindberg	1 August 1981 (aged 34)	1.88 m	211	587	(Germany) HSV Hamburg
20	GK	Kevin Møller	20 June 1989 (aged 26)	2.00 m	7	0	(Germany) SG Flensburg-Handewitt
21	LB	Henrik Møllgaard	2 January 1985 (aged 31)	1.96 m	78	129	(France) Paris Saint-Germain
23	P	Henrik Toft Hansen	18 December 1986 (aged 29)	2.00 m	64	123	(Germany) SG Flensburg-Handewitt
24	LB	Mikkel Hansen	22 October 1987 (aged 28)	1.96 m	139	644	(France) Paris Saint-Germain
27	LB	Michael Damgaard	18 March 1990 (aged 25)	1.92 m	17	50	(Germany) SC Magdeburg
29	RB	Peter Balling	11 April 1986 (aged 29)	1.88 m	7	13	(Denmark) Team Tvis Holstebro

=== Hungary ===
An 18-player squad was announced on 30 December 2015. A 17-man squad was named on 12 January 2016. The final squad was announced on 13 January 2016.

Head coach: Talant Duyshebaev

No.	Pos.	Name	Date of birth (age)	Height	App.	Goals	Club
1	GK	László Bartucz	5 November 1991 (aged 24)	1.94 m	5	0	(Hungary) Csurgó
5	P	Timuzsin Schuch	5 June 1985 (aged 30)	1.97 m	126	71	(Hungary) MVM Veszprém
6	RW	Ákos Pásztor	24 June 1991 (aged 24)	1.87 m	7	15	(Hungary) Tatabánya
8	LW	Gergő Iváncsik	30 November 1981 (aged 34)	1.90 m	254	677	(Hungary) MVM Veszprém
13	LW	Tibor Gazdag	7 August 1991 (aged 24)	1.87 m	9	19	(Hungary) Csurgó
15	RW	Péter Hornyák	4 October 1995 (aged 20)	1.75 m	6	6	(Hungary) Csurgó
16	GK	Roland Mikler	20 September 1984 (aged 31)	1.90 m	151	0	(Hungary) MVM Veszprém
18	LB	Kornél Nagy	21 November 1986 (aged 29)	1.95 m	120	195	(France) Dunkerque
19	RB	László Nagy	3 March 1981 (aged 34)	2.08 m	180	684	(Hungary) MVM Veszprém
22	LB	Iman Jamali	11 October 1991 (aged 24)	2.02 m	4	9	(Sweden) IFK Kristianstad
23	CB	Rudolf Faluvégi	9 January 1994 (aged 22)	1.92 m	6	14	(Hungary) Csurgó
25	P	Szabolcs Zubai	31 March 1984 (aged 31)	1.91 m	188	294	(Hungary) MOL-Pick Szeged
27	P	Bence Bánhidi	9 February 1995 (aged 20)	2.04 m	14	25	(Hungary) Balatonfüred
30	LB	Tamás Borsos	13 September 1990 (aged 25)	2.02 m	6	0	(Hungary) Cegléd
33	RB	Gábor Ancsin	27 November 1990 (aged 25)	2.02 m	67	144	(Hungary) MOL-Pick Szeged
39	LB	Richárd Bodó	13 March 1993 (aged 22)	2.03 m	17	56	(Hungary) Tatabánya

=== Montenegro ===
A 19-player squad was announced on 30 November 2015.

Head coach: Ljubomir Obradović

No.	Pos.	Name	Date of birth (age)	Height	App.	Goals	Club
1	GK	Rade Mijatović	30 June 1981 (aged 34)	1.92 m	47	2	(Hungary) Tatabánya
2	LB	Božidar Leković	4 January 1991 (aged 25)	2.02 m	2	0	(Romania) Dobrogea Sud Constanța
4	RW	Fahrudin Melić	22 July 1984 (aged 31)	1.83 m	38	131	(France) Paris Saint-Germain
5	CB	Mirko Milašević	27 July 1985 (aged 30)	1.95 m	29	66	(Romania) Dinamo București
7	RB	Stefan Čavor	3 November 1994 (aged 21)	1.97 m	6	8	(Hungary) Csurgó
8	P	Vuk Lazović	10 March 1988 (aged 27)	2.00 m	2	1	(Germany) TuS Nettelstedt-Lübbecke
10	CB	Božo Anđelić	16 March 1992 (aged 23)	1.86 m	5	2	(Hungary) Cegléd
12	GK	Mile Mijušković	8 October 1985 (aged 30)	1.99 m	4	0	(Slovenia) Maribor Branik
13	RW	Mirko Radović	15 June 1990 (aged 25)	1.86 m	10	7	(France) Valence
14	LW	Miloš Vujović	5 September 1993 (aged 22)	1.81 m	13	23	(Hungary) Tatabánya
18	P	Branko Kankaraš	28 May 1988 (aged 27)	1.88 m	4	4	(France) Valence
21	CB	Vasko Ševaljević	21 June 1988 (aged 27)	1.93 m	30	100	(France) Fenix Toulouse
22	GK	Radivoje Ristanović	2 December 1982 (aged 33)	2.00 m	4	0	(Germany) HBW Balingen-Weilstetten
23	CB	Bogdan Petričević	6 September 1989 (aged 26)	1.94 m	13	13	(France) Mulhouse
34	LB	Vuko Borozan	9 April 1994 (aged 21)	2.03 m	8	31	(Germany) TuS Nettelstedt-Lübbecke
90	P	Nemanja Grbović	26 April 1990 (aged 25)	1.83 m	25	27	(Hungary) Cegléd
93	RB	Vladan Lipovina	7 March 1993 (aged 22)	2.01 m	7	19	(Germany) HSG Wetzlar

=== Russia ===
A 21-player squad was announced on 19 December 2015. It was cut to 18 on 13 January 2016.

Head coach: Dmitri Torgovanov

No.	Pos.	Name	Date of birth (age)	Height	App.	Goals	Club
6	RW	Daniil Shishkarev	6 July 1988 (aged 27)	1.89 m	67	153	(North Macedonia) Vardar
7	RW	Dmitry Kovalev	15 May 1982 (aged 33)	1.80 m	159	396	(Russia) Chekhovskiye Medvedi
10	P	Alexander Chernoivanov	13 February 1979 (aged 36)	2.02 m	108	219	(Russia) Chekhovskiye Medvedi
11	CB	Pavel Atman	25 May 1987 (aged 28)	1.90 m	93	157	(Belarus) Meshkov Brest
12	GK	Vadim Bogdanov	26 March 1986 (aged 29)	1.97 m	74	0	(Poland) Azoty-Puławy
13	LB	Sergei Gorbok	4 December 1982 (aged 33)	1.96 m	48	164	(North Macedonia) Vardar
16	GK	Dmitry Pavlenko	1 January 1991 (aged 25)	1.90 m	6	0	(Russia) Chekhovskiye Medvedi
20	P	Mikhail Chipurin	14 July 1986 (aged 29)	1.85 m	191	484	(France) US Ivry
21	P	Gleb Kalarash	29 November 1990 (aged 25)	2.05 m	10	25	(Ukraine) Motor Zaporizhzhia
25	RB	Sergey Shelmenko	5 April 1983 (aged 32)	1.96 m	57	110	(Ukraine) Motor Zaporizhzhia
26	RW	Ruslan Dashko	13 August 1996 (aged 19)	1.98 m	5	13	(Russia) Dinamo Stavropol
30	LB	Valentin Buzmakov	17 April 1985 (aged 30)	1.92 m	5	6	(Russia) Permskie Medvedi
31	LW	Timur Dibirov	30 July 1983 (aged 32)	1.80 m	158	540	(North Macedonia) Vardar
44	LW	Igor Soroka	27 May 1991 (aged 24)	1.80 m	10	27	(Russia) Permskie Medvedi
74	P	Lev Tcelishchev	16 April 1990 (aged 25)	2.05 m	9	0	(Russia) Dinamo Astrakhan
87	GK	Victor Kireev	5 May 1987 (aged 28)	1.90 m	6	0	(Russia) Saint Petersburg
89	CB	Dmitry Zhitnikov	20 November 1989 (aged 26)	1.85 m	72	137	(Poland) Wisła Płock

== Statistics ==
=== Player representation by league system ===
In all, European Championship squad members play for clubs in 22 different countries.

Country	Player(s)	Outside national squad	Club(s)
Germany	68	53	SG Flensburg-Handewitt (9), THW Kiel (9), Rhein-Neckar Löwen (8), Füchse Berlin (7), HSG Wetzlar (5), TuS Nettelstedt-Lübbecke (4), SC Magdeburg (4), HBW Balingen-Weilstetten (3), Bergischer HC (3), HSV Hamburg (3), MT Melsungen (3), TSV Hannover-Burgdorf (2), Frisch Auf Göppingen (2), VfL Gummersbach (2), EHV Aue (1), ThSV Eisenach (1), TSG Friesenheim (1), TBV Lemgo (1)
France	36	23	Paris Saint-Germain (11), Montpellier (6), HBC Nantes (3), Saint-Raphaël (3), Fenix Toulouse (3), Dunkerque (2), USAM Nîmes (2), Valence (2), Pays d’Aix UC (1), US Créteil (1), Mulhouse (1), Tremblay-en-France (1)
Hungary	30	16	MVM Veszprém (10), MOL-Pick Szeged (7), Csurgó (5), Tatabánya (4), Cegléd (3), Balatonfüred (1)
Poland	20	9	Vive Targi Kielce (10), Wisła Płock (6), Azoty-Puławy (2), Górnik Zabrze (1), Śląsk Wrocław (1)
(North Macedonia) Macedonia	17	10	Vardar (13), Metalurg (3), Rabotnički (1)
Belarus	12	1	SKA Minsk (6), Meshkov Brest (5), Masheka Mogilev (1)
Spain	12	7	FC Barcelona (11), Logroño (1)
Denmark	10	8	Aalborg (2), Bjerringbro-Silkeborg (2), Skjern (2), GOG Gudme (1), Midtjylland (1), SønderjyskE (1), Team Tvis Holstebro (1)
Sweden	9	4	IFK Kristianstad (6), Alingsås HK (1), Eskilstuna Guif (1), Ystads IF (1)
Russia	8	1	Chekhovskiye Medvedi (2), Permskie Medvedi (2), Saint Petersburg (2), Dinamo Astrakhan (1), Dinamo Stavropol (1)
Slovenia	7	2	Celje (4), Maribor Branik (2), Gorenje (1)
Croatia	5	1	Zagreb (5)
Austria	5	5	Bregenz (2), ULZ Schwaz (2), UHK Krems (1)
Romania	4	4	CSM București (1), Dinamo București (1), Dobrogea Sud Constanța (1), Odorheiu Secuiesc (1)
Norway	3	0	Elverum (2), ØIF Arendal (1)
Qatar	3	3	El Jaish (2), Lekhwiya (1)
Ukraine	3	3	Motor Zaporizhzhia (3)
Iceland	2	0	ÍBV (2), Valur (1)
Serbia	2	0	Vojvodina (2)
Turkey	2	2	Beşiktaş (2)
Switzerland	1	1	BSV Bern Muri (1)
Israel	1	1	Maccabi Tel Aviv (1)

Nations in italics are not represented by their national teams in the finals.
German squad have only one player employed by a non-domestic club; that players are employed in Poland. Only Icelandic squad is made up entirely of players employed by overseas clubs; although one player on that squad. Of the countries not represented by a national team at the European Championship, Handball-Bundesliga provides the most squad members.

=== Player representation by club ===
Clubs with 10 or more players represented are listed.

Club	Players
(North Macedonia) Vardar	13
(Spain) FC Barcelona	11
(France) Paris Saint-Germain	11
(Poland) Vive Targi Kielce	10
(Hungary) MVM Veszprém	10

=== Coaches representation by country ===
Coaches in bold represent their own country.

Nº	Country	Coaches
3	Iceland	Guðmundur Guðmundsson (Denmark), **Aron Kristjánsson**, Dagur Sigurðsson (Germany)
2	Croatia	**Željko Babić**, Ivica Obrvan (Macedonia)
2	Serbia	Ljubomir Obradović (Montenegro), **Dejan Perić**
2	Spain	Talant Duyshebaev (Hungary), **Manolo Cadenas**
1	Belarus	**Yuri Shevtsov**
1	France	**Claude Onesta**
1	Germany	Michael Biegler (Poland)
1	Montenegro	Veselin Vujović (Slovenia)
1	Norway	**Christian Berge**
1	Russia	**Dmitri Torgovanov**
1	Sweden	**Ola Lindgren** / **Staffan Olsson**
