= 2020–21 EHF European League =

European handball tournament

EHF European League
- 2020–21

Tournament information
- Sport: Handball
- Dates: 28 August 2020–23 May 2021
- Teams: 51 (qualification stage); 24 (group stage)
- Website: ehfel.com

Final positions
- Champions: (Germany) SC Magdeburg
- Runner-up: (Germany) Füchse Berlin

Tournament statistics
- MVP: (Denmark) Jannick Green
- Top scorer(s): (Denmark) Emil Jakobsen (111 goals)

The 2020–21 EHF European League was the 1st edition of the EHF European League, replacing the EHF Cup as the second most important European handball club competition organised by the European Handball Federation (EHF), which had been in existence for 39 years.

== Team allocation ==
A total of 51 teams from 21 countries participated in the 2020–21 EHF European League.

=== Teams ===
Group stage
(Spain) CB Ademar León	(France) USAM Nîmes Gard	(Germany) SC Magdeburg	(Hungary) Grundfos Tatabanya KC
(North Macedonia) RK Eurofarm Pelister	(Poland) Orlen Wisła Płock	(Romania) Dinamo București	(Russia) Chekhovskiye Medvedi
(Switzerland) Kadetten Schaffhausen	(Slovakia) HT Tatran Prešov	(Sweden) Alingsås HK	(Turkey) Besiktas Aygaz
Second qualifying round
(Croatia) RK Nexe	(Denmark) GOG Håndbold	(Spain) BM Benidorm	(France) Fenix Toulouse Handball
(France) Montpellier HB	(Germany) Füchse Berlin	(Germany) Rhein-Neckar Löwen	(Hungary) Balatonfüredi KSE
(Portugal) Sporting CP			
First qualifying round
(Austria) Fivers	(Belarus) SKA Minsk	(Croatia) HRK Gorica	(Croatia) RK Dubrava
(Croatia) RK Spacva Vinkovci	(Denmark) Bjerringbro-Silkeborg	(Denmark) Skjern Håndbold	(Denmark) TTH Holstebro
(Spain) Bidasoa Irun	(France) PAUC Handball	(Germany) MT Melsungen	(Hungary) B. Braun Gyöngyös
(Iceland) Valur	(Luxembourg) Handball Esch	(North Macedonia) HC Butel Skopje	(North Macedonia) RK Metalurg Skopje
(Norway) Haslum HK	(Norway) ØIF Arendal	(Poland) KS Azoty-Puławy	(Portugal) CF Os Belenenses
(Portugal) SL Benfica	(Romania) HC Dobrogea Sud Constanta	(Romania) AHC Potaissa Turda	(Russia) HC CSKA
(Russia) HC Victor	(Slovenia) RK Trimo Trebnje	(Switzerland) HC Kriens-Luzern	(Switzerland) Pfadi Winterthur
(Sweden) HK Malmö	(Sweden) IFK Kristianstad		

== Round and draw dates ==
The schedule of the competition was as follows.

Phase	Round	Draw date	First leg	Second leg
Qualification	First qualifying round	28 July 2020	29-30 August 2020	5-6 September 2020
Qualification	Second qualifying round	8 September 2020	22 September 2020	29 September 2020
Group stage	Matchday 1	1 October 2020	20 October 2020	
Group stage	Matchday 2	1 October 2020	27 October 2020	
Group stage	Matchday 3	1 October 2020	17 November 2019	
Group stage	Matchday 4	1 October 2020	24 November 2020	
Group stage	Matchday 5	1 October 2020	1 December 2020	
Group stage	Matchday 6	1 October 2020	8 December 2020	
Group stage	Matchday 7	1 October 2020	9 February 2021	
Group stage	Matchday 8	1 October 2020	16 February 2021	
Group stage	Matchday 9	1 October 2020	23 February 2021	
Group stage	Matchday 10	1 October 2020	2 March 2021	
Knockout phase	Round of 16	No draw	23 March 2021	30 March 2021
Knockout phase	Quarter-finals	No draw	13 April 2021	20 April 2021
Knockout phase	Final four	27 April 2021	22–23 May 2021	

== Qualifying rounds ==
=== First qualifying round ===
==== Seeding ====
A total of 30 teams were involved in the first qualifying round draw, they were divided into three geographical zones, each one with two pots of five teams, to limit travel distances and to reduce possible travel restrictions amid the COVID-19 pandemic. Teams from the same country could not be drawn into the same tie.

Zone 1		Zone 2		Zone 3	
Seeded	Unseeded	Seeded	Unseeded	Seeded	Unseeded
(Belarus) SKA Minsk; (North Macedonia) HC Butel Skopje; (North Macedonia) RK Metalurg Skopje; (Romania) AHC Potaissa Turda; (Russia) HC Victor	(Croatia) HRK Gorica; (Croatia) RK Spacva Vinkovci; (Hungary) B. Braun Gyöngyös; (Romania) HC Dobrogea Sud Constanta; (Russia) HC CSKA	(Denmark) TTH Holstebro; (Germany) MT Melsungen; (Norway) ØIF Arendal; (Poland) KS Azoty-Puławy; (Sweden) HK Malmö	(Denmark) Bjerringbro-Silkeborg; (Denmark) Skjern Håndbold; (Iceland) Valur; (Norway) Haslum HK; (Sweden) IFK Kristianstad	(Croatia) RK Dubrava; (Spain) Bidasoa Irun; (Portugal) SL Benfica; (Slovenia) RK Trimo Trebnje; (Switzerland) Pfadi Winterthur	(Austria) Fivers; (France) PAUC Handball; (Luxembourg) Handball Esch; (Portugal) CF Os Belenenses; (Switzerland) HC Kriens-Luzern

==== Matches ====
Team 1	Agg.	Team 2	1st leg	2nd leg
AHC Potaissa Turda (Romania)	56–53	(Croatia) HRK Gorica	24–26	32–27
HC Dobrogea Sud Constanta (Romania)	54–45	(Russia) HC Victor	26–18	28–27
SKA Minsk (Belarus)	50–56	(Russia) HC CSKA	25–25	25–31
B. Braun Gyöngyös (Hungary)	58–46	(North Macedonia) HC Butel Skopje	34–21	24–25
RK Metalurg Skopje (North Macedonia)	60–57	(Croatia) RK Spacva Vinkovci	35–28	25–29
TTH Holstebro (Denmark)	Cancelled (Note: Due to travel restrictions imposed on Iceland in response to the COVID-19 pandemic, the matches between TTH Holstebro and Valur were cancelled, with the danish side advancing to the next round.)	(Iceland) Valur	Cancelled	Cancelled
IFK Kristianstad (Sweden)	Cancelled (Note: Due to travel restrictions imposed on Norway in response to the COVID-19 pandemic, both Norwegian teams competing in the second qualifying round, ØIF Arendal and Haslum Handballklubb, were disqualified with their opponents, IFK Kristianstad and KS Azoty-Puławy respectively, advancing to the next round.)	(Norway) ØIF Arendal	Cancelled	Cancelled
Bjerringbro-Silkeborg (Denmark)	57–51	(Germany) MT Melsungen	31–27	26–24
Skjern Håndbold (Denmark)	53–51	(Sweden) HK Malmö	27–26	26–25
KS Azoty-Puławy (Poland)	Cancelled	(Norway) Haslum HK	Cancelled	Cancelled
SL Benfica (Portugal)	62–64	(Austria) Fivers	28–26	34–38
Pfadi Winterthur (Switzerland)	33–30	(Luxembourg) Handball Esch	33–30	Cancelled
PAUC Handball (France)	25–30 (Note: The french club PAUC Handball waived their right to host the first leg of the first qualifying round due to effects of the COVID-19 pandemic. As a result, the match was decided over one leg, played in Spain.)	(Spain) Bidasoa Irun	Cancelled	25–30
CF Os Belenenses (Portugal)	49–56	(Slovenia) RK Trimo Trebnje	23–28	26–28
HC Kriens-Luzern (Switzerland)	57–46	(Croatia) RK Dubrava	29–27	28–19

=== Second qualifying round ===
==== Seeding ====
A total of 24 teams were involved in the second qualifying round draw, 15 advancing from the previous round and 9 teams entering this round. Teams were divided in two pots and were drawn without any restrictions.

Seeded	Unseeded
(Croatia) RK Nexe; (Denmark) Bjerringbro-Silkeborg; (Denmark) GOG Håndbold; (Spain) BM Benidorm; (France) Montpellier HB; (France) Fenix Toulouse Handball; (Germany) Füchse Berlin; (Germany) Rhein-Neckar Löwen; (Hungary) Balatonfüredi KSE; (North Macedonia) RK Metalurg Skopje; (Poland) KS Azoty-Puławy; (Portugal) Sporting CP	(Austria) Fivers; (Denmark) Skjern Håndbold; (Denmark) TTH Holstebro; (Spain) Bidasoa Irun; (Hungary) B. Braun Gyöngyös; (Romania) AHC Potaissa Turda; (Romania) HC Dobrogea Sud Constanta; (Russia) HC CSKA; (Slovenia) RK Trimo Trebnje; (Switzerland) Pfadi Winterthur; (Switzerland) HC Kriens-Luzern; (Sweden) IFK Kristianstad

==== Matches ====
Team 1	Agg.	Team 2	1st leg	2nd leg
HC Dobrogea Sud Constanta (Romania)	48–49	(Portugal) Sporting CP	27–27	21–22
KS Azoty-Puławy (Poland)	46–49	(Sweden) IFK Kristianstad	24–25	22–24
BM Benidorm (Spain)	Cancelled (Note: BM Benidorm announced two days prior to the second leg that they were unable to travel to travel to Vienna due to travel restrictions imposed in Spain as a response to the COVID-19 pandemic. As a result, BM Benidorm were disqualified, with their opponents, Fivers, advancing to the group stage.)	(Austria) Fivers	34–31	Cancelled
TTH Holstebro (Denmark)	49–54	(Germany) Rhein-Neckar Löwen	22–28	27–26
Bjerringbro-Silkeborg (Denmark)	50–55	(Russia) HC CSKA	26–23	24–32
AHC Potaissa Turda (Romania)	62–66	(France) Fenix Toulouse Handball	35–35	27–31
Bidasoa Irun (Spain)	54–56	(Croatia) RK Nexe	30–27	24–29
RK Metalurg Skopje (North Macedonia)	47–46	(Switzerland) HC Kriens-Luzern	26–24	21–22
GOG Håndbold (Denmark)	64–59	(Switzerland) Pfadi Winterthur	33–24	31–35
Skjern Håndbold (Denmark)	60–63	(France) Montpellier HB	31–30	29–33
B. Braun Gyöngyös (Hungary)	47–61	(Germany) Füchse Berlin	23–25	24–36
RK Trimo Trebnje (Slovenia)	23–22 (Note: Balatonfüredi KSE could not travel to Slovenia for the first leg due to a player testing positive to COVID-19. As a result, it was decided that the match should be played on one leg, at Slovenia, on the original date of the second leg.)	(Hungary) Balatonfüredi KSE	23–22	Cancelled

== Group stage ==
=== Seeding ===
The 24 teams were divided into six pots of four teams, with a team from each pot being drawn to each group. Teams from the same country could not be drawn into the same group.

Pot 1	Pot 2	Pot 3	Pot 4	Pot 5	Pot 6
(Spain) CB Ademar León; (France) USAM Nîmes Gard; (Germany) SC Magdeburg; (Hungary) Grundfos Tatabanya KC	(Poland) Orlen Wisła Płock; (Romania) Dinamo București; (Switzerland) Kadetten Schaffhausen; (Sweden) Alingsås HK	(North Macedonia) RK Eurofarm Pelister; (Russia) Chekhovskiye Medvedi; (Slovakia) HT Tatran Prešov; (Turkey) Besiktas Aygaz	(France) Fenix Toulouse Handball; (France) Montpellier HB; (Germany) Füchse Berlin; (Germany) Rhein-Neckar Löwen	(Austria) Fivers; (Croatia) RK Nexe; (Denmark) GOG Håndbold; (Portugal) Sporting CP	(North Macedonia) RK Metalurg Skopje; (Slovenia) RK Trimo Trebnje; (Sweden) IFK Kristianstad; (Russia) HC CSKA

=== Tiebreakers ===
Teams were ranked according to points (2 points for a win, 1 point for a draw, 0 points for a loss), and if tied on points, the following tiebreaking criteria were applied, in the order given, to determine the rankings:

1. Points in matches among tied teams;
2. Goal difference in matches among tied teams;
3. Away goals scored in matches among tied teams;
4. Goal difference in all group matches;
5. Goals scored in all group matches;
6. If more than two teams were tied, and after applying all head-to-head criteria above, a subset of teams were still tied, all head-to-head criteria above were reapplied exclusively to this subset of teams;
7. Drawing lots.

=== Group A ===
Pos	Team	Pld	W	D	L	GF	GA	GD	Pts	Qualification
1	(Poland) Orlen Wisła Płock	10	8	0	2	297	242	+55	16	Knockout stage
2	(Spain) CB Ademar León	10	5	4	1	307	296	+11	14	Knockout stage
3	(Russia) Chekhovskiye Medvedi	10	7	0	3	301	264	+37	14	Knockout stage
4	(Austria) Fivers	10	2	2	6	301	311	−10	6	Knockout stage
5	(France) Fenix Toulouse Handball	10	2	2	6	227	250	−23	6	
6	(North Macedonia) RK Metalurg Skopje	10	1	2	7	259	329	−70	4	

Source: EHF
Rules for classification: Tiebreakers

=== Group B ===
Pos	Team	Pld	W	D	L	GF	GA	GD	Pts	Qualification
1	(Germany) Füchse Berlin	10	6	2	2	247	223	+24	14	Knockout stage
2	(France) USAM Nîmes Gard	10	5	2	3	279	263	+16	12	Knockout stage
3	(Sweden) IFK Kristianstad	10	5	1	4	273	276	−3	11	Knockout stage
4	(Portugal) Sporting CP	10	5	0	5	244	241	+3	10	Knockout stage
5	(Romania) Dinamo București	10	3	1	6	279	298	−19	7	
6	(Slovakia) HT Tatran Prešov	10	3	0	7	233	254	−21	6	

Source: EHF
Rules for classification: Tiebreakers

=== Group C ===
Pos	Team	Pld	W	D	L	GF	GA	GD	Pts	Qualification
1	(Germany) SC Magdeburg	10	9	0	1	321	230	+91	18	Knockout stage
2	(Russia) HC CSKA	10	7	0	3	263	219	+44	14	Knockout stage
3	(France) Montpellier HB	10	6	0	4	231	197	+34	12	Knockout stage
4	(Croatia) RK Nexe	10	5	0	5	269	284	−15	10	Knockout stage
5	(Sweden) Alingsås HK	10	3	0	7	262	304	−42	6	
6	(Turkey) Besiktas Aygaz	10	0	0	10	238	350	−112	0	

Source: EHF
Rules for classification: Tiebreakers

=== Group D ===
Pos	Team	Pld	W	D	L	GF	GA	GD	Pts	Qualification
1	(Germany) Rhein-Neckar Löwen	10	8	1	1	296	256	+40	17	Knockout stage
2	(Switzerland) Kadetten Schaffhausen	10	6	2	2	261	251	+10	14	Knockout stage
3	(Denmark) GOG Håndbold	10	6	0	4	306	305	+1	12	Knockout stage
4	(North Macedonia) RK Eurofarm Pelister	10	5	1	4	244	237	+7	11	Knockout stage
5	(Slovenia) RK Trimo Trebnje	10	3	0	7	250	273	−23	6	
6	(Hungary) Grundfos Tatabanya KC	10	0	0	10	263	298	−35	0	

Source: EHF
Rules for classification: Tiebreakers

== Knockout stage ==
The pairings for the last 16 and the quarter-finals are based on group stage standings, according to the following bracket. This assures teams from the same group can only play each other again in the final four.

Last 16
23/30 March
3D (Denmark) GOG Håndbold	33	35	68
2C (Russia) HC CSKA	31	30	61
23/30 March
4B (Portugal) Sporting CP	25	28	53
1A (Poland) Orlen Wisła Płock	29	25	54
23/30 March
3C (France) Montpellier HB	27	32	59
2D (Switzerland) Kadetten Schaffhausen	27	25	52
23/30 March
4A (Austria) Fivers	27	0	27
1B (Germany) Füchse Berlin	35	10	45
23/30 March
3B (Sweden) IFK Kristianstad	34	34	68
2A (Spain) CB Ademar León	27	31	58
23/30 March
4D (North Macedonia) RK Eurofarm Pelister	24	24	48
1C (Germany) SC Magdeburg	32	35	67
23/30 March
3A (Russia) Chekhovskiye Medvedi	30	24	54
2B (France) USAM Nîmes Gard	25	24	49
23/30 March
4C (Croatia) RK Nexe	25	27	52
1D (Germany) Rhein-Neckar Löwen	27	27	54

Quarter-finals
13/20 April
3D (Denmark) GOG Håndbold	30	26	56
1A (Poland) Orlen Wisła Płock	27	31	58
13/20 April
3C (France) Montpellier HB	32	23	55
1B (Germany) Füchse Berlin	29	31	60
13/20 April
3B (Sweden) IFK Kristianstad	28	31	59
1C (Germany) SC Magdeburg	34	39	73
13/20 April
3A (Russia) Chekhovskiye Medvedi	33	27	60
1D (Germany) Rhein-Neckar Löwen	32	37	69

=== Last 16 ===
The last 16 first legs were scheduled for 23 March 2021, while the second legs followed on 30 March 2021.

Team 1	Agg.	Team 2	1st leg	2nd leg
GOG Håndbold (Denmark)	68–61	(Russia) HC CSKA	33–31	35–30
Sporting CP (Portugal)	53–54	(Poland) Orlen Wisła Płock	25–29	28–25
Montpellier HB (France)	59–52	(Switzerland) Kadetten Schaffhausen	27–27	32–25
Fivers (Austria)	27–45	(Germany) Füchse Berlin	27–35	0–10
IFK Kristianstad (Sweden)	68–58	(Spain) CB Ademar León	34–27	34–31
RK Eurofarm Pelister (North Macedonia)	48–67	(Germany) SC Magdeburg	24–32	24–35
Chekhovskiye Medvedi (Russia)	54–49	(France) USAM Nîmes Gard	30–25	24–24
RK Nexe (Croatia)	52–54	(Germany) Rhein-Neckar Löwen	25–27	27–27

=== Quarterfinals ===
The quarter-finals first legs were scheduled for 13 April 2021, while the second legs followed on 20 April 2021.

Team 1	Agg.	Team 2	1st leg	2nd leg
GOG Håndbold (Denmark)	56–58	(Poland) Orlen Wisła Płock	30–27	26–31
Montpellier HB (France)	55–60	(Germany) Füchse Berlin	32–29	23–31
IFK Kristianstad (Sweden)	59–73	(Germany) SC Magdeburg	28–34	31–39
Chekhovskiye Medvedi (Russia)	60–69	(Germany) Rhein-Neckar Löwen	33–32	27–37

=== Final four ===
The EHF Finals Men 2021 was played on 22 and 23 May 2021 in Mannheim, Germany and comprised one leg semifinals, final and third-place match. The pairings for the semifinals were decided by drawing of lots.

==== Bracket ====
Semifinals
22 May
(Germany) SC Magdeburg	30
(Poland) Orlen Wisła Płock	29
22 May
(Germany) Rhein-Neckar Löwen	32
(Germany) Füchse Berlin	35

Final
23 May
(Germany) SC Magdeburg	28
(Germany) Füchse Berlin	25
Third place
23 May
(Poland) Orlen Wisła Płock	27
(Germany) Rhein-Neckar Löwen	32

==== Semifinals ====
22 May 2021; 18:00	SC Magdeburg (Germany)	30–29	(Poland) Orlen Wisła Płock	SAP Arena, Mannheim; Referees: Santos, Fonseca (POR)
22 May 2021; 18:00	Damgaard, Magnússon 6	(13–15)	Krajewski, Szita 7	SAP Arena, Mannheim; Referees: Santos, Fonseca (POR)
22 May 2021; 18:00	4× (suspension)	Report	2× (yellow card) 7× (suspension)	SAP Arena, Mannheim; Referees: Santos, Fonseca (POR)

22 May 2021; 20:45	Rhein-Neckar Löwen (Germany)	32–35	(Germany) Füchse Berlin	SAP Arena, Mannheim; Referees: Brkic, Jusufhodzic (AUT)
22 May 2021; 20:45	Tollbring 7	(16–19)	Andersson 11	SAP Arena, Mannheim; Referees: Brkic, Jusufhodzic (AUT)
22 May 2021; 20:45	2× (yellow card) 6× (suspension) 1× (red card)	Report	2× (yellow card) 5× (suspension)	SAP Arena, Mannheim; Referees: Brkic, Jusufhodzic (AUT)

==== Third-place game ====
23 May 2021; 18:00	Orlen Wisła Płock (Poland)	27–32	(Germany) Rhein-Neckar Löwen	SAP Arena, Mannheim; Referees: Bíró, Kiss (HUN)
23 May 2021; 18:00	Krajewski, Szita 6	(12–15)	Tollbring 11	SAP Arena, Mannheim; Referees: Bíró, Kiss (HUN)
23 May 2021; 18:00	2× (yellow card) 3× (suspension)	Report	1× (yellow card) 3× (suspension)	SAP Arena, Mannheim; Referees: Bíró, Kiss (HUN)

==== Final ====
23 May 2021; 20:30	SC Magdeburg (Germany)	28–25	(Germany) Füchse Berlin	SAP Arena, Mannheim; Referees: Nikolić, Stojković (SRB)
23 May 2021; 20:30	Hornke, Magnússon 7	(15–8)	Lindberg 8	SAP Arena, Mannheim; Referees: Nikolić, Stojković (SRB)
23 May 2021; 20:30	1× (yellow card) 4× (suspension)	Report	2× (yellow card) 3× (suspension)	SAP Arena, Mannheim; Referees: Nikolić, Stojković (SRB)

== Top goalscorers ==
Rank	Player	Club	Goals
1	(Denmark) Emil Jakobsen	(Denmark) GOG Håndbold	111
2	(Iceland) Ómar Ingi Magnússon	(Germany) SC Magdeburg	94
3	(Croatia) Halil Jaganjac	(Croatia) RK Nexe	80
4	(Sweden) Adam Nyfjäll	(Sweden) IFK Kristianstad	74
4	(Sweden) Jerry Tollbring	(Germany) Rhein-Neckar Löwen	74
6	(Russia) Alexander Kotov	(Russia) Chekhovskiye Medvedi	72
7	(France) Hugo Descat	(France) Montpellier HB	71
8	(Denmark) Mathias Gidsel	(Denmark) GOG Håndbold	69
9	(Denmark) Hans Lindberg	(Germany) Füchse Berlin	68
9	(Spain) Gonzalo Pérez Arce	(Spain) CB Ademar León	68
9	(Hungary) Zoltán Szita	(Poland) Orlen Wisła Płock	68

== See also ==
- 2020–21 EHF Champions League
