= KS Azoty-Puławy =

Polish handball club

- Full name: Klub Sportowy Azoty-Puławy
- Founded: 2003; 23 years ago
- Arena: Grupa Azoty Arena, Puławy
- Capacity: 3,138
- President: Jerzy Witaszek
- Head coach: Patryk Kuchczyński
- League: Polish Superliga
- Club colours

KS Azoty-Puławy is a men's handball club from Puławy, Poland, that plays in the Superliga.

Location of KS Azoty-Puławy

== History ==
The club was founded on the initiative of Jerzy Witaszek, Piotr Dropek and Artur Witkowski on May 28, 2003 under the name Klub Sportowy Wisła-Azoty Puławy, with Jerzy Witaszek as its president. Since 2003, the team has been part of II. League, from 2004 in the I. League, and from 2005 in the Superliga, Poland's highest league. In March 2006, the name "Wisła" was removed from the club's name, which changed to Azoty-Puławy. The team also won bronze medals in the Superliga in the 2014/15, 2015/2016, 2016/2017 and 2017/2018 seasons. In the 2017/2018 season, the team also reached the finals of the Polish Cup, where they lost to PGE Vive Kielce on May 13, 2018 in Kalisz (29:35). The team won bronze medals again in the 2020/21 and 2021/22 seasons. The Grupa Azoty Arena was handed over in October 2021, which from then on became the team's new home.

== Crest, colours, supporters ==
=== Naming history ===
Name	Period
Klub Sportowy Wisła-Azoty Puławy	2003–2006
Klub Sportowy Azoty-Puławy	2006–present

== Sports Hall information ==
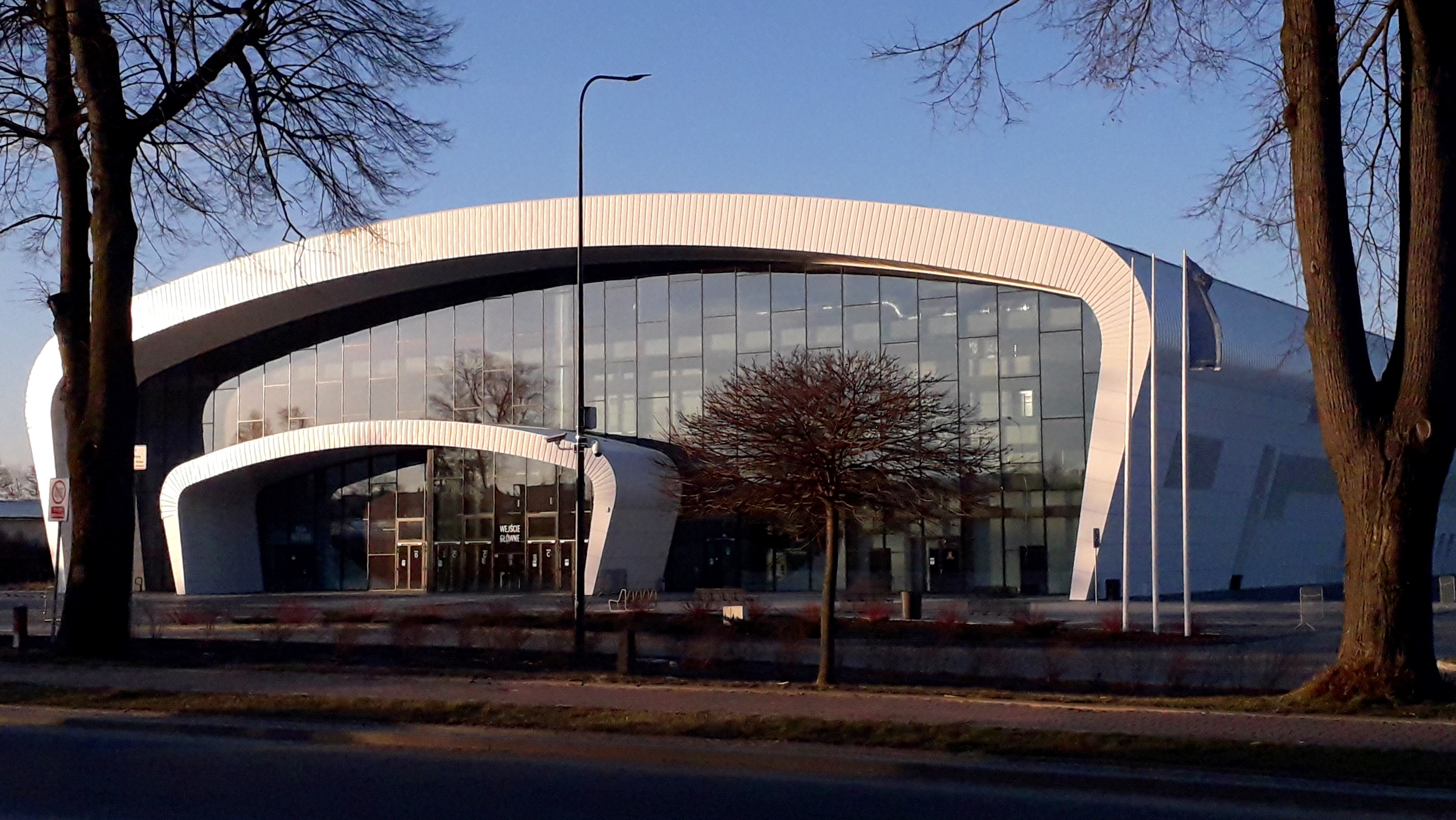
Home hall: Grupa Azoty Arena

- Arena: - Grupa Azoty Arena
- City: - Puławy
- Capacity: - 3138
- Address: - Lubelska 59, Puławy, Poland.

== Management ==
Position	Name
President	(Poland) Jerzy Witaszek
Chairman of the Supervisory Board	(Poland) Przemysław Jarnicki
Member of the Supervisory Board	(Poland) Ewa Pieńczakowska
Member of the Supervisory Board	(Poland) Jacek Pakuła

== Team ==
=== Current squad ===
Squad for the 2025–26 season

Goalkeepers

- (Poland) Paweł Ciupa
- (North Macedonia) Andrej Petkovski

Left wingers

- (Ukraine) Dmytro Artemenko
- (Ukraine) Pavlo Savytskyi

Right wingers

- (Poland) Rafał Adamczewski
- (Poland) Krzysztof Komarzewski

Line players

- 24 (Poland) Ignacy Jaworski
- (Poland) Dawid Cacak

Left backs

- 23 (Poland) Jan Antolak
- 37 (Poland) Jakub Bereziński
- (Romania) Dan Racoțea

Centre backs

- 29 (Poland) Gustaw Kowalik
- (Poland) Jakub Curzytek
- (Poland) Krzysztof Łyżwa

Right backs

- (Poland) Szymon Działakiewicz
- (Poland) Daniel Wisiński

=== Transfers ===
Transfers for the 2026–27 season

Joining

- (Poland) Wojciech Borucki (GK) back from loan at (Poland) Wisła Płock

Leaving

- (Romania) Dan Racoțea (LB) to (Poland) Gwardia Opole
- (Ukraine) Dmytro Artemenko (LW) to (Poland) Gwardia Opole
- (North Macedonia) Andrej Petkovski (GK) to (Czech Republic) Talent Plzeň
- (Poland) Krzysztof Komarzewski (RW) to (Poland) SPR Chrobry Głogów
- (Poland) Szymon Działakiewicz (RB) to (Poland) MMTS Kwidzyn
- (Poland) Jan Antolak (LB) to (Poland) KPR Legionowo
- (Poland) Ignacy Jaworski (LP) to (Poland) KPR Legionowo
- (Poland) Daniel Wisiński (RB) to (Poland) Gwardia Opole
- (Poland) Wojciech Borucki (GK) to (Germany) HSG Krefeld

=== Transfer History ===
Transfers for the 2025–26 season

Joining

- (Romania) Dan Racoțea (LB) from (Poland) Górnik Zabrze
- (Ukraine) Dmytro Artemenko (LW) from (Poland) Górnik Zabrze
- (North Macedonia) Andrej Petkovski (GK) from (North Macedonia) RK Tineks Prolet
- (Poland) Szymon Działakiewicz (RB) from (Poland) Górnik Zabrze
- (Poland) Krzysztof Komarzewski (RW) from (Poland) Górnik Zabrze
- (Poland) Krzysztof Łyżwa (CB) from (Poland) KPR Ostrovia
- (Poland) Daniel Wisiński (RB) from (Poland) Górnik Zabrze
- (Poland) Paweł Ciupa (GK) (back from loan at (Poland) Nielba Wągrowiec)
- (Ukraine) Pavlo Savytskyi (LW) (from (Poland) Orlen Wisła II Płock)
- (Poland) Jakub Curzytek (CB) (from (Poland) Orzeł Przeworsk)
- (Poland) Rafał Adamczewski (RW) (from (Poland) SMS ZPRP Płock)
- (Poland) Dawid Cacak (P) (on loan from (Poland) Stal Mielec)

Leaving

- (Georgia (country)) Giorgi Dikhaminjia (RW) to (Iceland) KA
- (Georgia (country)) Zurab Tsintsadze (GK) to (Poland) KPR Legionowo
- (Poland) Piotr Jarosiewicz (LW) to (Poland) Industria Kielce
- (Poland) Marek Marciniak (RW) to (North Macedonia) RK Vardar
- (Poland) Maciej Zarzycki (CB) to (Poland) Gwardia Opole
- (Poland) Kelian Janikowski (LP) to (Poland) Gwardia Opole
- (Poland) Łukasz Gogola (CB) to (Romania) HC Buzău
- (Poland) Tobiasz Górski (LW) (to ?)
- (Poland) Karol Przychodzeń (RW) (to ?)
- (Poland) Wojciech Borucki (GK) on loan at (Poland) Orlen Wisła Płock

== Previous squads ==
2017–2018 Team
Shirt No	Nationality	Player	Birth Date	Position
1	Russia	Vadim Bogdanov	26 March 1986 (age 40)	Goalkeeper
4	Poland	Patryk Kuchczyński	17 March 1983 (age 43)	Right Winger
5	Poland	Kamil Sliwinski	11 November 1996 (age 29)	Left Winger
6	Poland	Jakub Kosiak	8 December 1997 (age 28)	Right Winger
7	Poland	Robert Orzechowski	20 November 1989 (age 36)	Right Back
8	Poland	Paweł Podsiadło	29 March 1986 (age 40)	Left Back
9	Poland	Piotr Jarosiewicz	28 June 1998 (age 28)	Left Winger
10	Poland	Krzysztof Łyżwa	28 May 1990 (age 36)	Central Back
12	Poland	Emil Wiejak	21 June 1998 (age 28)	Goalkeeper
13	Poland	Adam Skrabania	21 February 1985 (age 41)	Left Winger
14	Poland	Mateusz Flont	20 October 1998 (age 28)	Right Back
16	North Macedonia	Daniel Dupjačanec	15 July 1983 (age 43)	Goalkeeper
17	Poland	Kacper Adamczuk	25 February 1997 (age 29)	Left Back
18	Bosnia and Herzegovina	Marko Panić	10 March 1991 (age 35)	Right Back
20	Poland	Pawel Grzelak	26 November 1987 (age 38)	Line Player
21	Poland	Piotr Masłowski	20 February 1988 (age 38)	Central Back
22	BelarusPoland	Vitaliy Titov	2 May 1980 (age 46)	Right Back
24	Poland	Bartosz Kowalczyk	18 December 1996 (age 29)	Central Back
25	Poland	Tomasz Kasprzak	6 February 1986 (age 40)	Line Player
31	Poland	Bartosz Jurecki	31 January 1979 (age 47)	Line Player
32	Ukraine	Vladyslav Ostroushko	5 March 1986 (age 40)	Left Back
34	Bosnia and Herzegovina	Nikola Prce	31 August 1980 (age 46)	Left Back
44	Poland	Wojciech Gumiński	10 February 1989 (age 37)	Left Winger
81	Ukraine	Valentyn Koshovy	5 February 1981 (age 45)	Goalkeeper
88	Poland	Mateusz Seroka	24 December 1988 (age 37)	Right Winger

2013–2014 Team
Shirt No	Nationality	Player	Birth Date	Position
2	Poland	Pawel Kowalik	13 March 1991 (age 35)	Right Back
4	Poland	Paweł Ćwikliński	1 February 1985 (age 41)	Right Winger
6	Poland	Krzysztof Tylutki	23 July 1985 (age 41)	Left Back
7	Poland	Mateusz Jankowski	22 March 1988 (age 38)	Line Player
10	Poland	Krzysztof Łyżwa	28 May 1990 (age 36)	Central Back
11	Poland	Mateusz Kus	14 July 1987 (age 39)	Line Player
12	Lithuania	Vilius Rašimas	8 November 1989 (age 36)	Goalkeeper
13	Poland	Adam Skrabania	21 February 1985 (age 41)	Left Winger
14	Bosnia and Herzegovina	Marko Tarabochia	28 November 1988 (age 37)	Central Back
15	Poland	Adam Babicz	6 December 1985 (age 40)	Left Back
18	Poland	Michał Szyba	18 March 1988 (age 38)	Right Back
19	Poland	Rafał Przybylski	19 February 1991 (age 35)	Right Back
20	Poland	Pawel Grzelak	26 November 1987 (age 38)	Line Player
21	Poland	Piotr Masłowski	20 February 1988 (age 38)	Central Back
22	Poland	Maciej Stęczniewski	8 May 1973 (age 53)	Goalkeeper
23	Belarus	Artur Barzenkou	13 September 1987 (age 39)	Left Back
26	Poland	Przemysław Krajewski	20 January 1987 (age 39)	Left Winger
35	Poland	Rafał Grzybowski	22 October 1990 (age 36)	Goalkeeper
44	Czech Republic	Jan Sobol	22 May 1984 (age 42)	Right Winger

== Honours ==
- Polish Superliga:
  - Bronze (6): 2015, 2016, 2017, 2018, 2021, 2022
- Polish Cup:
  - Silver (1): 2018
  - Bronze (3): 2013, 2014, 2023

=== Individual awards ===
==== Domestic ====
Polish Superliga Top Scorer

Season	Name	Goals
2009–10	(Poland) Wojciech Zydroń	247
2014–15	(Poland) Przemysław Krajewski	160

== European record ==
=== EHF European League / EHF Cup ===
Season	Round	Club	Home	Away	Aggregate
2022–23	Round 2	(Croatia) RK Nexe	32–26	27–35	59–61
2021–22	Round 1	(Croatia) MRK Sesvete	29–21	37–25	66–46
2021–22	Round 2	(Germany) Füchse Berlin	24–32	29–33	53–65
2020–21	Round 1	(Norway) Haslum HK	Cancelled (Note: Due to travel restrictions imposed on Norway in response to the COVID-19 pandemic, Haslum Handballklubb were disqualified.)		
2020–21	Round 2	(Sweden) IFK Kristianstad	24–25	22–24	46–49
2019–20	Round 2	(Luxembourg) Handball Esch	31–28	26–25	57–53
2019–20	Round 3	(Poland) Gwardia Opole	29–28	24–26	53–54
2018–19	Round 3	(Iceland) Selfoss	33–26	27–28	60–54
2018–19	Group stage	(Denmark) GOG Håndbold	28–31	29–41	4th place
2018–19	Group stage	(Germany) THW Kiel	26–35	23–26	4th place
2018–19	Group stage	(Spain) Fraikin Granollers	34–34	29–30	4th place
2017–18	Round 3	(Denmark) TTH Holstebro	30–27	29–32	59–59
2017–18	Group stage	(Switzerland) Wacker Thun	31–29	34–26	3rd place
2017–18	Group stage	(Spain) Fraikin Granollers	30–37	26–32	3rd place
2017–18	Group stage	(France) Chambéry Savoie	25–27	22–28	3rd place
2016–17	Round 3	(Portugal) SL Benfica	34–29	18–24	52–53
2015–16	Round 3	(Switzerland) Pfadi Winterthur	23–30	25–29	48–59

=== EHF Challenge Cup ===
Season	Round	Club	Home	Away	Aggregate
2014–15	Round 3	(Serbia) Metaloplastika	32–24	26–20	58–44
2014–15	Last 16	(Belgium) HC Visé BM	35–26	32–30	67–56
2014–15	Quarterfinals	(Portugal) SL Benfica	29–37	32–31	61–68
2013–14	Round 3	(Turkey) Özel Idare SK	27–23	35–20	62–43
2013–14	Round 4	(Turkey) Nilüfer BK	39–31	36–29	75–60
2013–14	Quarter-finals	(Belgium) UHC Tongeren	31–22	26–23	57–45
2013–14	Semi-finals	(Sweden) IK Sävehof	28–30	38–40	66–70
2012–13	Last 16	(Belgium) Initia Hasselt	29–29	21–21	50–50
2011–12	Round 3	(Croatia) RK Bjelovar	20–19	22–24	42–43
2010–11	Round 3	(North Macedonia) HC VV Tikvesh 06	24–22	23–24	47–46
2010–11	Last 16	(Norway) Stord Handball	25–24	29–23	54–47
2010–11	Quarter-finals	(Slovenia) RK Koper	25–25	26–33	51–58

=== EHF ranking ===
As of 5/12/2024

Rank	Team	Points
105	(Czech Republic) SKKP Handball Brno	48
106	(Belgium) HC Achilles Bocholt	47
107	(Kosovo) KH Besa Famgas	47
108	(Poland) KS Azoty-Puławy	46
109	(Italy) Handball Sassari	46
110	(Israel) Handball Club Holon	45
111	(Finland) Riihimäki Cocks	45

== Former club members ==
=== Notable former players ===
The list includes players who have played at least once for their national team or spent at least 10 years with the team.

==== Goalkeepers ====
- (Poland) Maciej Stęczniewski (2009–2014)
- (Poland) Piotr Wyszomirski (2007–2012)
- (Poland) Mateusz Zembrzycki (2020–2024)
- (Czech Republic) Jakub Krupa (2015–2017)
- (Georgia (country)) Zurab Tsintsadze (2023–)
- (Lithuania) Vilius Rašimas (2013–2015)
- (North Macedonia) Daniel Dupjačanec (2017–2018)
- (North Macedonia) Kiril Kolev (2011–2012)
- (Russia) Vadim Bogdanov (2014–2023)
- (Ukraine) Valentyn Koshovy (2016–2021)

==== Right wingers ====
- (Poland) Dawid Fedeńczak (2021–2024)
- (Poland) Patryk Kuchczyński (2015–2018)
- (Poland) Mateusz Seroka (2017–2021)
- (Georgia (country)) Giorgi Dikhaminjia (2024–)
- (Croatia) Jerko Matulić (2018–2019)
- (Czech Republic) Jan Sobol (2013–2017)
- (Ukraine) Andrii Akimenko (2020–2022)

==== Left wingers ====
- (Poland) Wojciech Gumiński (2017–2022)
- (Poland) Piotr Jarosiewicz (2017–)
- (Poland) Przemysław Krajewski (2012–2017)
- (Poland) Przemysław Urbaniak (2016–2017)
- (Poland) Wojciech Zydroń (2008–2012)

==== Line players ====
- (Poland) Marek Daćko (2022–2023)
- (Poland) Dawid Dawydzik (2019–2022)
- (Poland) Mateusz Jankowski (2012–2014)
- (Poland) Bartosz Jurecki (2016–2018)
- (Poland) Mateusz Kus (2008–2015)
- (Poland) Łukasz Rogulski (2018–2022)
- (Belarus) Aliaksandr Tsitou (2015)
- (Czech Republic) Leoš Petrovský (2015–2017)
- (Ukraine) Ivan Burzak (2022–2024)

==== Left backs ====
- (Poland) Kacper Adamski (2022–)
- (Poland) Michał Jurecki (2020–2023)
- (Poland) Michał Kubisztal (2015–2017)
- (Poland) Antoni Łangowski (2019–2022)
- (Poland) Paweł Podsiadło (2017–2022)
- (Bosnia and Herzegovina) Nikola Prce (2014–2019)
- (Belarus) Artur Barzenkou (2012–2014)
- (Ukraine) Vladyslav Ostroushko (2018, 2023–2024)

==== Central backs ====
- (Poland) Bartosz Kowalczyk (2016–2018, 2019–2023)
- (Poland) Krzysztof Łyżwa (2011–2015, 2016–2019)
- (Poland) Piotr Masłowski (2011–2019)
- (Poland) Jakub Moryń (2019)
- (Poland) Maciej Zarzycki (2023–)
- (Bosnia and Herzegovina) Marko Tarabochia (2013–2015)
- (Belarus) Aliaksandr Bachko (2020–2022)
- (Croatia) Ante Kaleb (2018–2019)
- (Lithuania) Deividas Virbauskas (2023–2024)

==== Right backs ====
- (Poland) Robert Orzechowski (2015–2018)
- (Poland) Rafał Przybylski (2012–2017, 2019–2024)
- (Poland) Michał Szyba (2004–2014, 2019–2021)
- (Austria) Boris Zivkovic (2021–2024)
- (Bosnia and Herzegovina) Marko Panić (2017–2019)
- (Bosnia and Herzegovina) Kosta Savić (2014–2015)
- (Ukraine) Vladyslav Dontsov (2022)

=== Former coaches ===
Seasons	Coach	Country
2003	Piotr Dropek	(Poland)
2004	Jacek Zglinicki	(Poland)
2004	Stanisław Kubala	(Poland)
2005	Bogdan Kowalczyk	(Poland)
2006	Edward Koziński	(Poland)
2006	Robert Nowakowski	(Poland)
2006	Roman Trzmiel	(Poland)
2007	Bogdan Kowalczyk	(Poland)
2007–2008	Giennadij Kamielin	(Kazakhstan)
2008–2009	Piotr Dropek	(Poland)
2009	Marek Motyczyński	(Poland)
2010–2011	Bogdan Kowalczyk	(Poland)
2011–2013	Marcin Kurowski	(Poland)
2013–2014	Bogdan Kowalczyk	(Poland)
2014	Dragan Marković	(Bosnia and Herzegovina) (Germany)
2014–2016	Ryszard Skutnik	(Poland)
2016–2017	Marcin Kurowski	(Poland)
2017–2018	Daniel Waszkiewicz	(Poland)
2018–2019	Bartosz Jurecki	(Poland)
2019	Zbigniew Markuszewski	(Poland)
2019	Michał Skórski	(Poland)
2020–2021	Lars Walther	(Denmark)
2021–2023	Robert Lis	(Poland)
2023–2024	Serhiy Bebeshko	(Ukraine)
2024–	Patryk Kuchczyński	(Poland)
