= Wojciech Gumiński =

Polish handball player (born 1989)

Personal information
- Nationality: Polish
- Born: 10 February 1989 (age 37) Gorzów Wielkopolski, Poland
- Height: 1.90 m (6 ft 3 in)

Sport
- Sport: Handball
- Position: Left wing
- Current club: KS Azoty-Puławy
- Number: 44

Senior clubs
- Years: Team
- 2006–2011: Stal Gorzów Wielkopolski
- 2008–2009: → AZS Uniwersytet Zielonogórski (loan)
- 2011–2016: Zagłębie Lubin
- 2016–2017: KPR Legionowo
- 2017–: KS Azoty-Puławy
National team
Years	Team	Apps	(Gls)
2014–	Poland	10	(22)

Wojciech Gumiński (born 10 February 1989) is a Polish handball player for KS Azoty-Puławy and the Polish national team.
