= Bogdan Kowalczyk =

Polish handball player (born 1946)

Personal information
- Born: 12 August 1946 (age 79) Warsaw, Poland
- Height: 180 cm (5 ft 11 in)
- Weight: 81 kg (179 lb)

Bogdan Kowalczyk (born 12 August 1946) is a former Polish handball player who competed in the 1972 Summer Olympics and then became a handball coach; he coached the Iceland men's national handball team to victory in the 1989 World Men's Handball Championship of B teams and was later coach of the Polish national team. He is widely considered to be a major influence on the development of handball in Iceland.

== Playing career ==
Kowalczyk was born in Warsaw. He began his career as a handball player with Warszawianka in 1961, where he was on the team that won the Polish Junior Championships in 1964. From 1965 to 1968 he played for KS Warszawianka and from 1968 to 1978 for Śląsk Wrocław in Wrocław, where he was on the teams that won the second division of the Polish Handball League in 1969–1971 and won the Polish Superliga championship every year from 1972 to 1978.

He played 43 times for the Polish national team, first appearing in an international friendly game on 6 December 1964 and making his last appearance against Norway on 9 September 1972. In 1972 he was part of the Polish team that finished tenth at the 1972 Summer Olympics. He played two matches.

== Coaching career ==
In 1970 Kowalczyk graduated from the University of Wrocław with a master's degree in physical education. From 1973 to 1978 he was a coach as well as a player at Śląsk Wrocław; the team continued to top the Superliga and won the Polish handball cup in 1976. In 1978 they lost in the final of the European Cup.

In 1978 he went to Iceland, where he coached the Víkingur team for 12 years, leading them to national league championships in 1980–1983.

In 1983 he was appointed coach of the Iceland men's national handball team. Under him they came 6th in the 1984 Summer Olympics, 8th at the 1988 Summer Olympics, and 6th at the 1986 World Championships, and won the 1989 World Men's Handball Championship of B teams.

In 1990 he returned to Poland, where he continued to coach until 2014. From 1992 to 1994 he coached the Poland men's national handball team. At the club level, he coached at Warszawianka (1997–2001), Wisła Płock (2003–2004, 2008), and KS Azoty-Puławy (2005, 2007, 2010–2011).

== Honours ==
- 1989: Knight's Cross of the Order of the Falcon, Iceland
