= Bartosz Kowalczyk =

Polish handball player (born 1996)

Personal information
- Nationality: Polish
- Born: 18 December 1996 (age 29) Dąbrowa Białostocka, Poland
- Height: 1.91 m (6 ft 3 in)

Sport
- Sport: Handball
- Position: Centre back
- Current club: KS Azoty-Puławy
- Number: 24

Youth career
- Years: Team
- –2012: Słoneczny Stok Białystok

Senior clubs
- Years: Team
- 2012–2015: SMS Gdańsk
- 2015–: KS Azoty-Puławy
- 2018–2019: → SPR Stal Mielec (loan)
National team
Years	Team	Apps	(Gls)
2018–	Poland	7	(7)

Bartosz Kowalczyk (born 18 December 1996) is a Polish handball player for KS Azoty-Puławy and the Polish national team.
