= Lars Walther =

Danish handball player (born 1965)

Personal information
- Full name: Lars Lynge Walther
- Nationality: Danish
- Born: 15 October 1965 (age 61) Aalborg, Denmark
- Height: 1.92 m (6 ft 3 1/2 in)

Sport
- Sport: Handball
- Current club: (manager)

Senior clubs
- Years: Team
- –: Aalborg Håndbold
- -1998: Sporting CP
- 1988-1992: Brønderslev IF
- 1992-1994: Aalborg KFUM
- 1994-1996: CS Marítimo
- 1996-1998: HSG Nordhorn
- 1998-2000: KA Akureyri
- 2000: HSV Emden

Teams managed
- 2001–2002: Virum-Sorgenfri HK
- 2002–2004: Roar Roskilde
- 2004–2005: SG Flensburg-Handewitt
- 2005–2006: RK Gorenje
- 2006–2007: Eintracht Hildesheim
- 2007–2008: Pallamano Conversano
- 2008–2010: TV Emsdetten
- 2010–2013: Wisła Płock
- 2014–2015: HC Minaur Baia Mare
- 2015–2017: Kadetten Schaffhausen
- 2017–2018: FC Porto
- 2018–2020: Ribe-Esbjerg HH
- 2020–2021: KS Azoty-Puławy
- 2022–2023: RK Eurofarm Pelister
- 2023- ?: Toyota Autobody - Kariya Japan

Lars Walther (born 15 October 1965) is a Danish retired handball player and current handball coach. He is currently coaching Toyota Autobody- Kariya Japan.

As a player he won the Portuguese cup in 1988.

As a coach he has won the Polish championship in 2011, the Romanian championship and cup in 2015 and the Swiss championship and cup in 2016.
