= Krzysztof Łyżwa =

Polish handball player (born 1990)

Personal information
- Nationality: Polish
- Born: 28 May 1990 (age 36) Ostrów Wielkopolski, Poland
- Height: 1.95 m (6 ft 5 in)

Sport
- Sport: Handball
- Position: Centre back, Right back
- Current club: KS Azoty-Puławy
- Number: 10

Senior clubs
- Years: Team
- –2009: Ostrovia Ostrów Wielkopolski
- 2009–2011: HC Baník Karviná
- 2011–2019: KS Azoty-Puławy
- 2015–2016: → Ostrovia Ostrów Wielkopolski (loan)
- 2019–: NMC Górnik Zabrze
National team
| Years | Team | Apps | (Gls) |
| 2016–2017 | Poland | 14 | (10) |

Krzysztof Łyżwa (born 28 May 1990) is a Polish handball player for KS Azoty-Puławy and the Polish national handball team.

He participated at the 2017 World Men's Handball Championship.
