= Rafał Przybylski =

Polish handball player (born 1991)

Personal information
- Nationality: Polish
- Born: 19 February 1991 (age 35) Szczecin, Poland
- Height: 2.00 m (6 ft 7 in)

Sport
- Sport: Handball
- Position: Right back
- Current club: KS Azoty-Puławy
- Number: 11

Youth career
- Years: Team
- –2007: Kusy Szczecin

Senior clubs
- Years: Team
- 2007–2010: SMS Gdańsk
- 2010–2012: MKS Nielba Wągrowiec
- 2012–2017: KS Azoty-Puławy
- 2017–2019: Fenix Toulouse
- 2019–: KS Azoty-Puławy
National team
Years	Team	Apps	(Gls)
2013–	Poland	96	(166)
- Updated on 28 December 2022

Rafał Przybylski (born 19 February 1991) is a Polish handball player for KS Azoty-Puławy and for the Polish national handball team.

He competed at the 2017 World Men's Handball Championship in France.
