= Szymon Działakiewicz =

Polish handball player (born 2000)

Personal information
- Nationality: Polish
- Born: 17 February 2000 (age 26) Legnica, Poland
- Height: 1.90 m (6 ft 3 in)

Sport
- Sport: Handball
- Position: Right back
- Current club: KS Azoty-Puławy
- Number: 24

Youth career
- Years: Team
- –2016: (Poland) UKS Dziewiątka Legnica

Senior clubs
- Years: Team
- 2016–2019: (Poland) SMS Gdańsk
- 2019–2021: (Poland) Gwardia Opole
- 2021–2022: (Germany) VfL Gummersbach
- 2022–2023: (Sweden) Redbergslids IK
- 2023–2024: (Hungary) SC Pick Szeged
- 2024: (Germany) GWD Minden
- 01/2025–06/2025: (Poland) Górnik Zabrze
- 2025–: (Poland) KS Azoty-Puławy
National team
Years	Team	Apps	(Gls)
2019–	Poland	3	(5)

Szymon Działakiewicz (born 17 February 2000) is a Polish handball player for KS Azoty-Puławy.
