= Patryk Kuchczyński =

Polish handball player (born 1983)

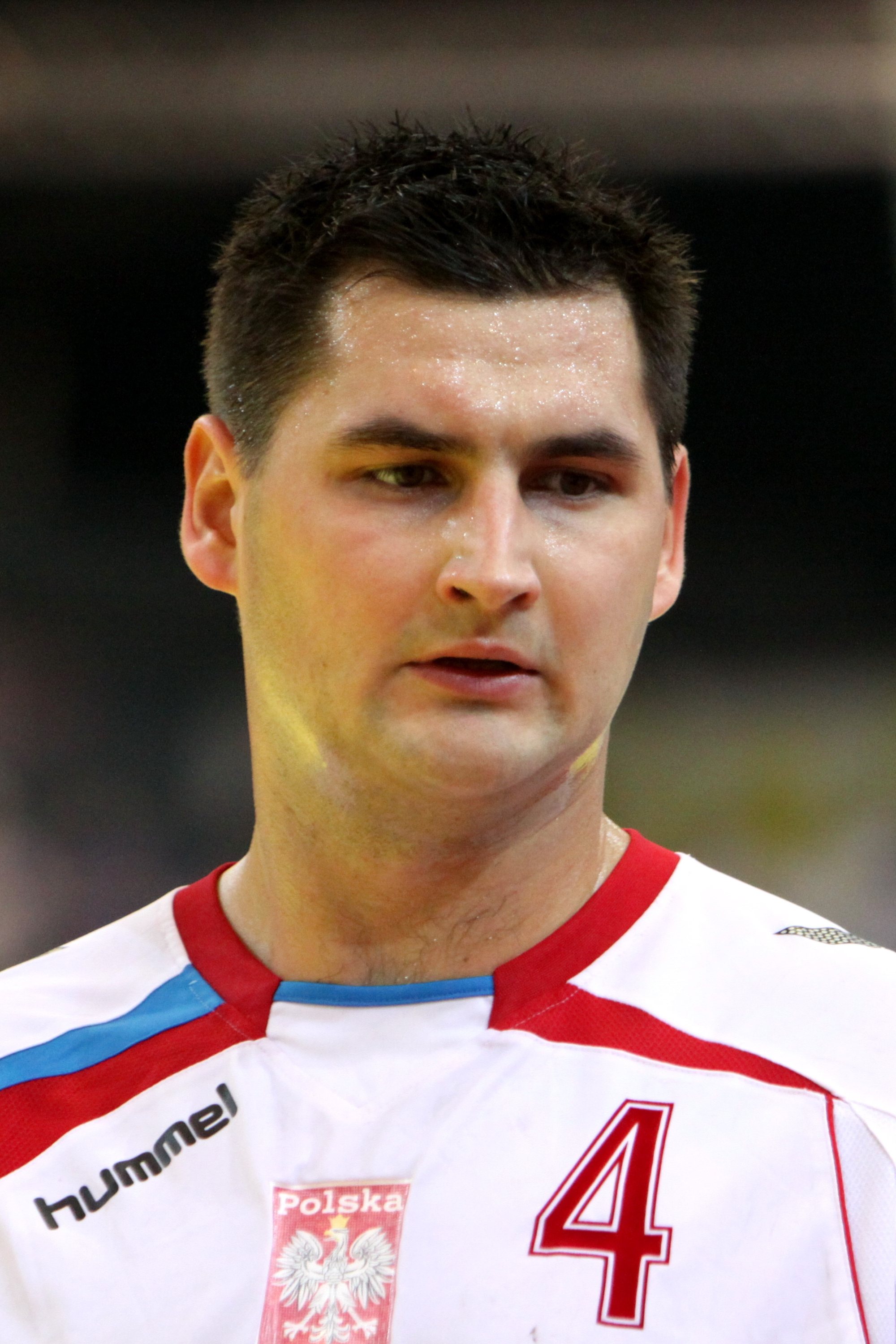

Personal information
- Nationality: Polish
- Born: 17 March 1983 (age 43) Gdynia, Poland
- Height: 1.82 m (6 ft 0 in)

Sport
- Sport: Handball
- Position: Right wing

Senior clubs
- Years: Team
- –2000: MKS Brodnica
- 2000–2003: Wybrzeże Gdańsk
- 2003–2012: Vive Targi Kielce
- 2012–2015: NMC Górnik Zabrze
- 2015–2018: KS Azoty-Puławy
- 2018–2019: UMKS Orleta Zwolen
National team
Years	Team	Apps	(Gls)
2002–2014	Poland	201	(435)
Medal record
World Championships
Silver medal – second place	2007 Germany	Team
Bronze medal – third place	2009 Croatia	Team

Patryk Kuchczyński (born 17 March 1983) is a former Polish team handball player.

He received a silver medal with the Polish team at the 2007 World Men's Handball Championship, he was also part of the Polish squad, which won bronze medal at the 2009 World Men's Handball Championship. Position - Left Forward (winger).
