= Robert Lis =

Polish handball player and coach (born 1973)

Personal information
- Nationality: Polish
- Born: 10 December 1973 (age 52) Warsaw, Poland
- Height: 1.92 m (6 ft 4 in)

Sport
- Sport: Handball
- Position: Pivot
- Current club: KS Azoty-Puławy (manager)

Senior clubs
- Years: Team
- 1991–2000: KS Warszawianka
- 2000–2004: US Dunkerque HB
- 2004–2008: PSG Handball
- 2008–2011: Istres Provence Handball
- 2011–2012: AZS Uniwersytet Warszawski
National team
Years	Team	Apps	(Gls)
1994–2004	Poland	128	(260)

Teams managed
- 2012–2013: AZS Uniwersytet Warszawski
- 2013–2017: KPR Legionowo
- 2016–2017: Poland (assistant)
- 2017–2020: MKS Lublin
- 2021–: KS Azoty-Puławy

Robert Lis (born 10 December 1973) is a former Polish handball player and current coach of KS Azoty-Puławy.
