= Lev Tselishchev =

Russian handball player

Lev Tcelishchev
Personal information
- Nationality: Russian
- Born: 16 April 1990 (age 36) Kyshtym, Soviet Union
- Height: 2.05 m (6 ft 9 in)

Sport
- Sport: Handball
- Position: Left Back
- Current club: HC Taganrog

Youth career
- Years: Team
- 2004-2007: Sungul Chelyabinsk

Senior clubs
- Years: Team
- 2007-2013: Sungul Chelyabinsk
- 2013-2016: Dynamo Astrakhan
- 2016-2018: HC Motor Zaporizhzhia
- 2018-2020: Spartak Moscow
- 2020-2021: Dynamo Astrakhan
- 2021-: HC Taganrog
National team
Years	Team	Apps	(Gls)
–	Russia	9	(0)

Lev Arkadyevich Tcelishchev (Russian: Лев Аркадьевич Целищев; born 16 April 1990) is a Russian handball player who plays for HC Taganrog and the Russian national team.

He competed at the 2016 European Men's Handball Championship.
