= Daniel Dupjačanec =

Macedonian handball player

Personal information
- Nationality: Macedonian
- Born: 15 July 1983 (age 43) Prilep, SR Macedonia
- Height: 1.90 m (6 ft 3 in)

Sport
- Sport: Handball
- Position: Goalkeeper
- Current club: Handball Bagnols Gard Rhodanien
- Number: 10

Senior clubs
- Years: Team
- –: (North Macedonia) RK Tutunski Kombinat
- –: (North Macedonia) RK Mladost Bogdanci
- –: (Iran) Aluminium Arak
- 2010–2012: (Kosovo) KH BESA Famiglia
- 2012–2013: (Kosovo) KH Prishtina
- 2013–2015: (Kosovo) KH BESA Famiglia
- 2015–2016: (North Macedonia) RK Metalurg Skopje
- 2016–2017: (Switzerland) Kadetten Schaffhausen
- 2017–2018: (Poland) KS Azoty-Puławy
- 2019–2022: (North Macedonia) RK Metalurg Skopje
- 2022: (North Macedonia) RK Metalurg RA
- 2022: (France) Villeurbanne Handball
- 2023: (France) Handball Club Cournon-d'Auvergne
- 2023–: (France) Handball Bagnols Gard Rhodanien
National team
Years	Team	Apps	(Gls)
2015–	Macedonia	2	(0)

Daniel Dupjačanec (Macedonian: Даниел Дупјачанец; born 15 July 1983) is a Macedonian handball player who plays for Handball Bagnols Gard Rhodanien.
