= Michał Szyba =

Polish handball player (born 1988)

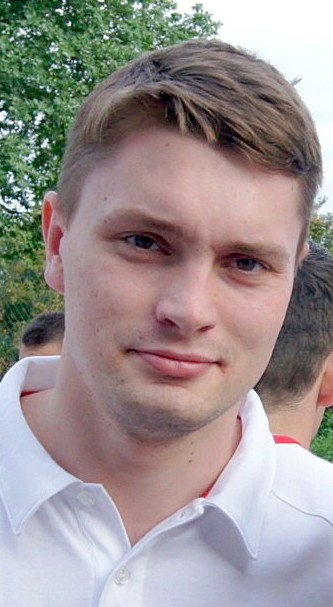

Personal information
- Nationality: Polish
- Born: 18 March 1988 (age 38) Lublin, Poland
- Height: 1.96 m (6 ft 5 in)

Sport
- Sport: Handball
- Position: Right back

Senior clubs
- Years: Team
- 2004–2014: KS Azoty-Puławy
- 2014–2016: RK Gorenje Velenje
- 2016–2018: Kadetten Schaffhausen
- 2018−2019: Cesson Rennes MHB
- 2019–2023: KS Azoty-Puławy
National team
Years	Team	Apps	(Gls)
2013–2017	Poland	80	(105)
Medal record
World Championship
Bronze medal – third place	2015 Qatar

Michał Szyba (born 18 March 1988) is a Polish retired handball player.

He is a bronze medalist of the 2015 World Championship.

== Career ==
=== National team ===
He debuted on the national team on 4 June 2013 in a friendly match against Sweden (27:29).

On 1 February 2015 Poland won the bronze medal of the 2015 World Championship. They won bronze medal match (29:28) against Spain. In the match for the bronze medal, he threw the goal which gave a draw and led to overtime which the Poles won.

He also participated at the 2016 Summer Olympics in Rio de Janeiro, in the men's handball tournament.

== Sporting achievements ==
=== National team ===
==== World Championship ====
- 2015 Qatar

=== State awards ===
- 2015 Silver Cross of Merit
