= Bartosz Jurecki =

Polish handball player and coach (born 1979)

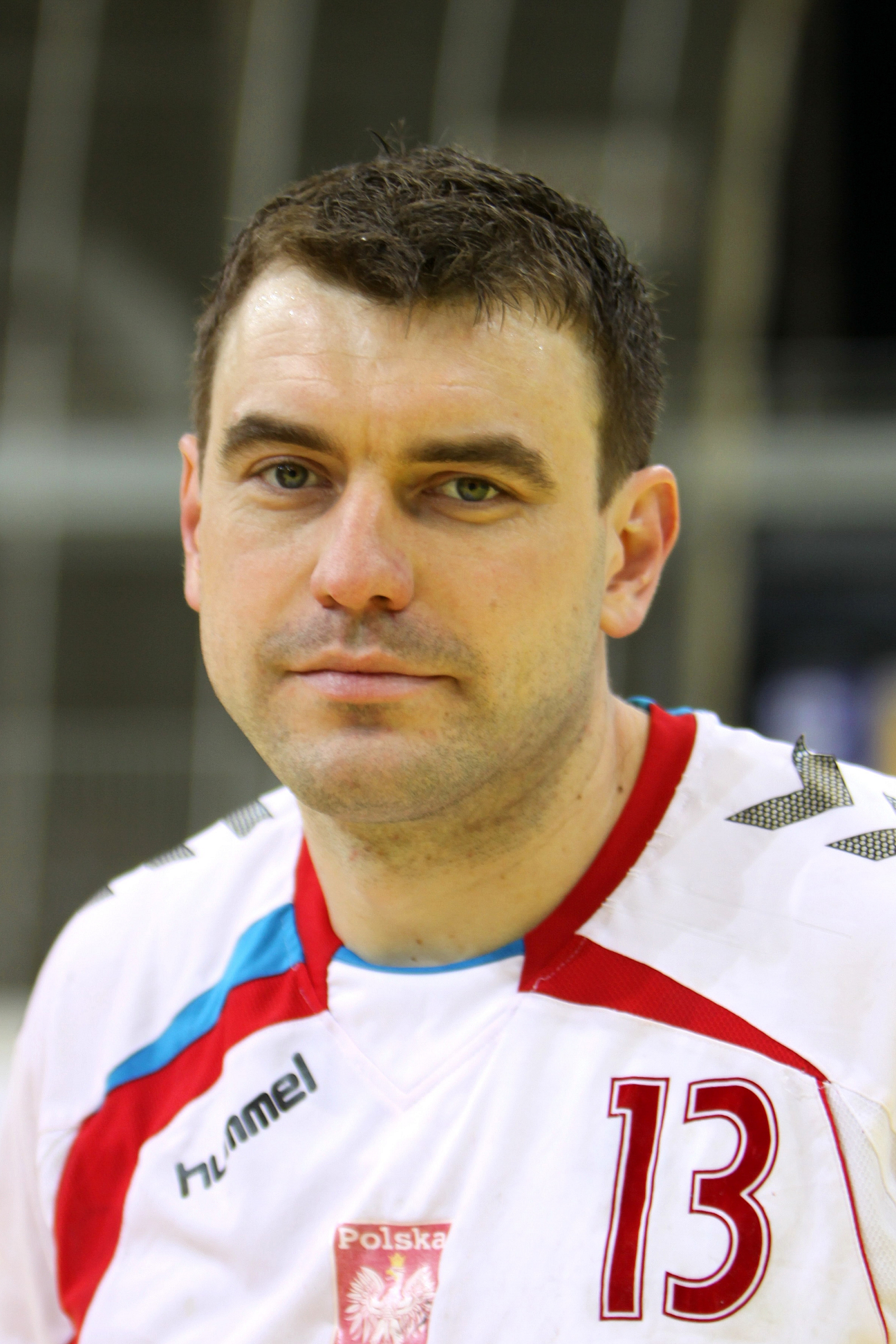

Personal information
- Nationality: Polish
- Born: 31 January 1979 (age 47) Kościan, Poland
- Height: 1.92 m (6 ft 4 in)

Sport
- Sport: Handball
- Position: Pivot
- Current club: Piotrkowianin Piotrków Trybunalski (manager)

Senior clubs
- Years: Team
- –2001: Tęcza Kościan
- 2001–2002: Olimpia Piekary Śląskie
- 2002–2006: SPR Chrobry Głogów
- 2006–2015: SC Magdeburg
- 2015–2016: SPR Chrobry Głogów
- 2016–2018: KS Azoty-Puławy
National team
Years	Team	Apps	(Gls)
2004–2016	Poland	237	(732)

Teams managed
- 2018–2019: KS Azoty-Puławy
- 2019–2023: Piotrkowianin Piotrków Trybunalski
- 2020–2023: Poland (assistant coach)
- 2023: Poland (caretaker)
- 2023–: Gwardia Opole
- 2024–: Poland u21
Medal record
World Championship
Silver medal – second place	2007 Germany
Bronze medal – third place	2009 Croatia
Bronze medal – third place	2015 Qatar

Bartosz Jurecki (born 31 January 1979) is a former Polish handball player who is currently the manager of Piotrkowianin Piotrków Trybunalski.

== Career ==
He won silver in the 2007 World Men's Handball Championship and bronze in 2009. He was also a member of the Polish national team in the 2008 Summer Olympic Games, where Poland finished fifth and in the 2016 Summer Olympics where Poland took fourth place.

== State awards ==
- 2007 Gold Cross of Merit
- 2015 Knight's Cross of Polonia Restituta

== Private life ==
His younger brother Michał Jurecki is also a handball player.

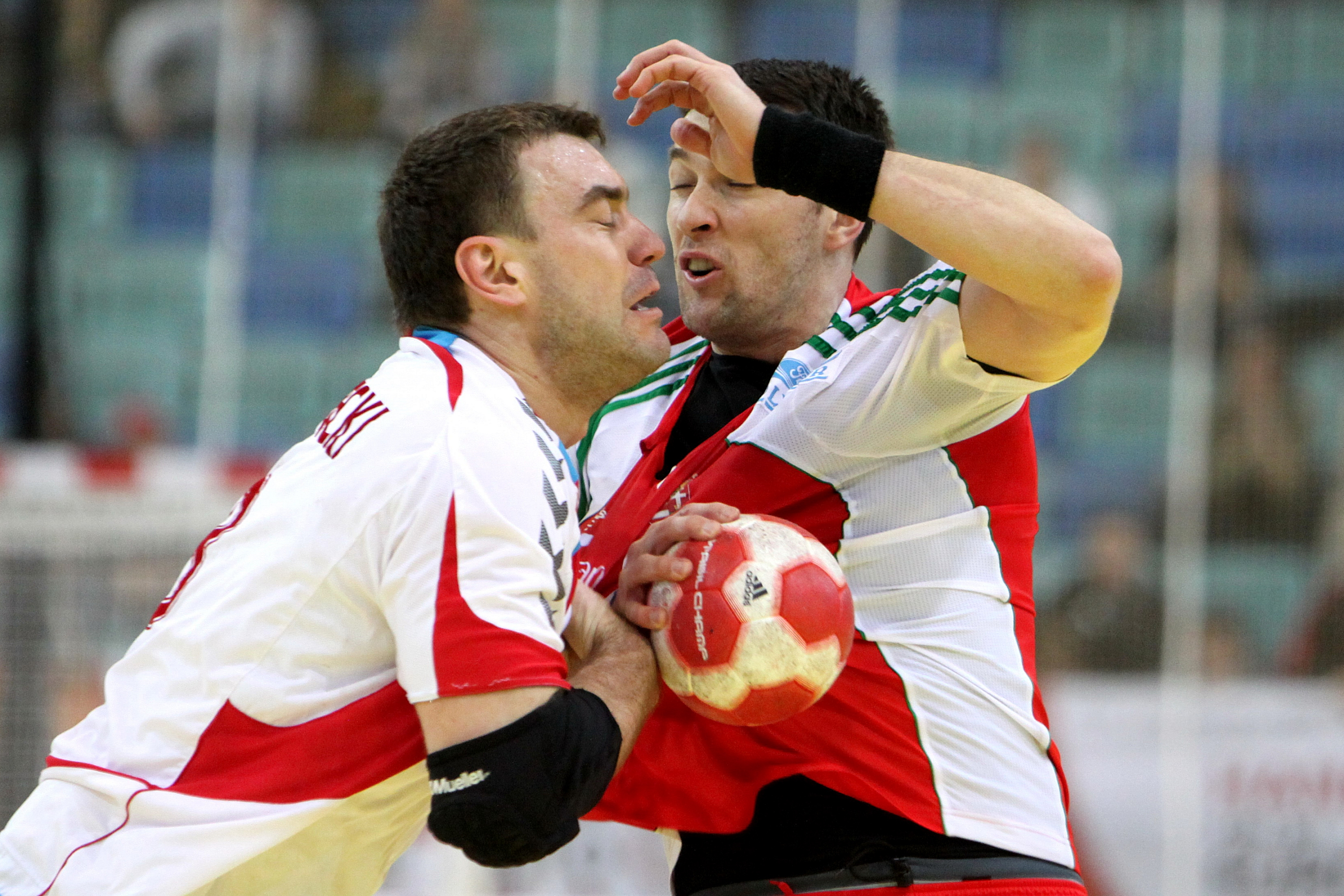
Bartosz Jurecki (left) blocks Ferenc Ilyés
