= Božidar Leković =

Montenegrin handball player (born 1991)

Personal information
- Nationality: Montenegrin
- Born: 4 January 1991 (age 35) Bar, Montenegro
- Height: 2.02 m (6 ft 8 in)

Sport
- Sport: Handball
- Position: Left back
- Current club: free agent

Senior clubs
- Years: Team
- 20??-2013: RK Mornar Bar
- 2013-2014: RK Metaloplastika Šabac
- 2014-2015: Olympiakos SFP
- 2015-2017: HC Farul Constanta
- 2017-2018: RK Izviđač Ljubuški
- 2018-2019: Pallamano Trieste
- 2019: Al Arabi Kuwait
- 2019-2020: Maccabi Dimona
- 2020-2021: RK Slavija
- 2021-2022: Sloga Doboj
- 2022-2023: RK Metalac
- 2023-2024: RK Šamot 65
- 2024-2025: Prilep
National team
Years	Team	Apps	(Gls)
–	Montenegro	8	(0)

Božidar Leković (born 4 January 1991) is a Montenegrin handball player who plays for Serbian team RK Metalac and the Montenegrin national team.
