= Vadim Bogdanov =

Russian handball player

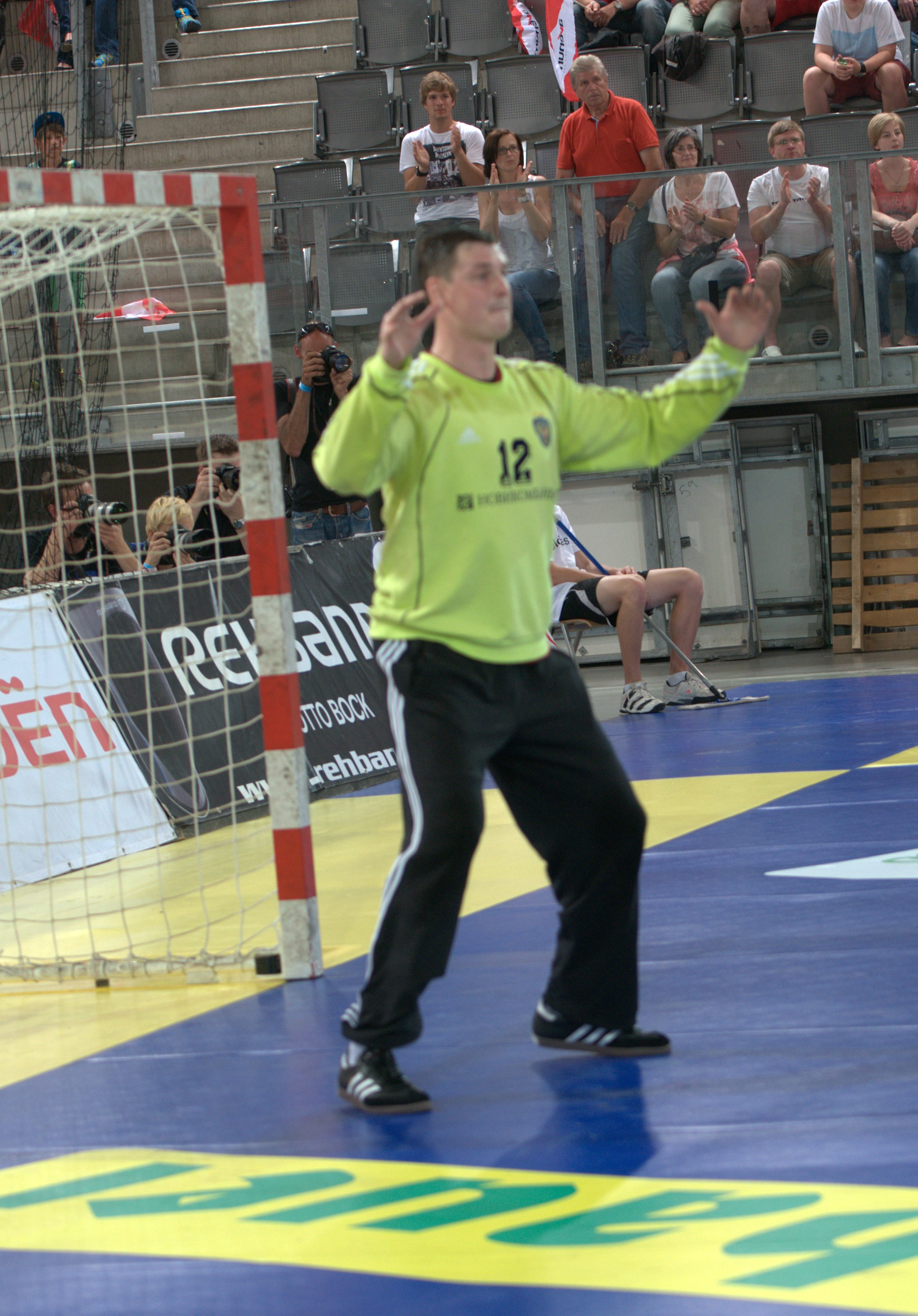

Personal information
- Nationality: Russian
- Born: 26 March 1986 (age 40) Leningrad, Russian SFSR, Soviet Union
- Height: 1.97 m (6 ft 6 in)

Sport
- Sport: Handball
- Position: Goalkeeper
- Current club: HBC CSKA Moscow
- Number: 1

Senior clubs
- Years: Team
- 2007–2010: Chekhovskiye Medvedi
- 2010–2012: Saint Petersburg HC
- 2012–2014: Dinamo Minsk
- 2014–2023: KS Azoty-Puławy
- 2023–: HBC CSKA Moscow
National team
Years	Team	Apps	(Gls)
2008–	Russia	84	(0)

Vadim Andreyevich Bogdanov (Russian: Вадим Андреевич Богданов; born 26 March 1986) is a Russian handball player for HBC CSKA Moscow and the Russian national team.
