= Piotr Masłowski (handball player) =

Polish handball player (born 1988)

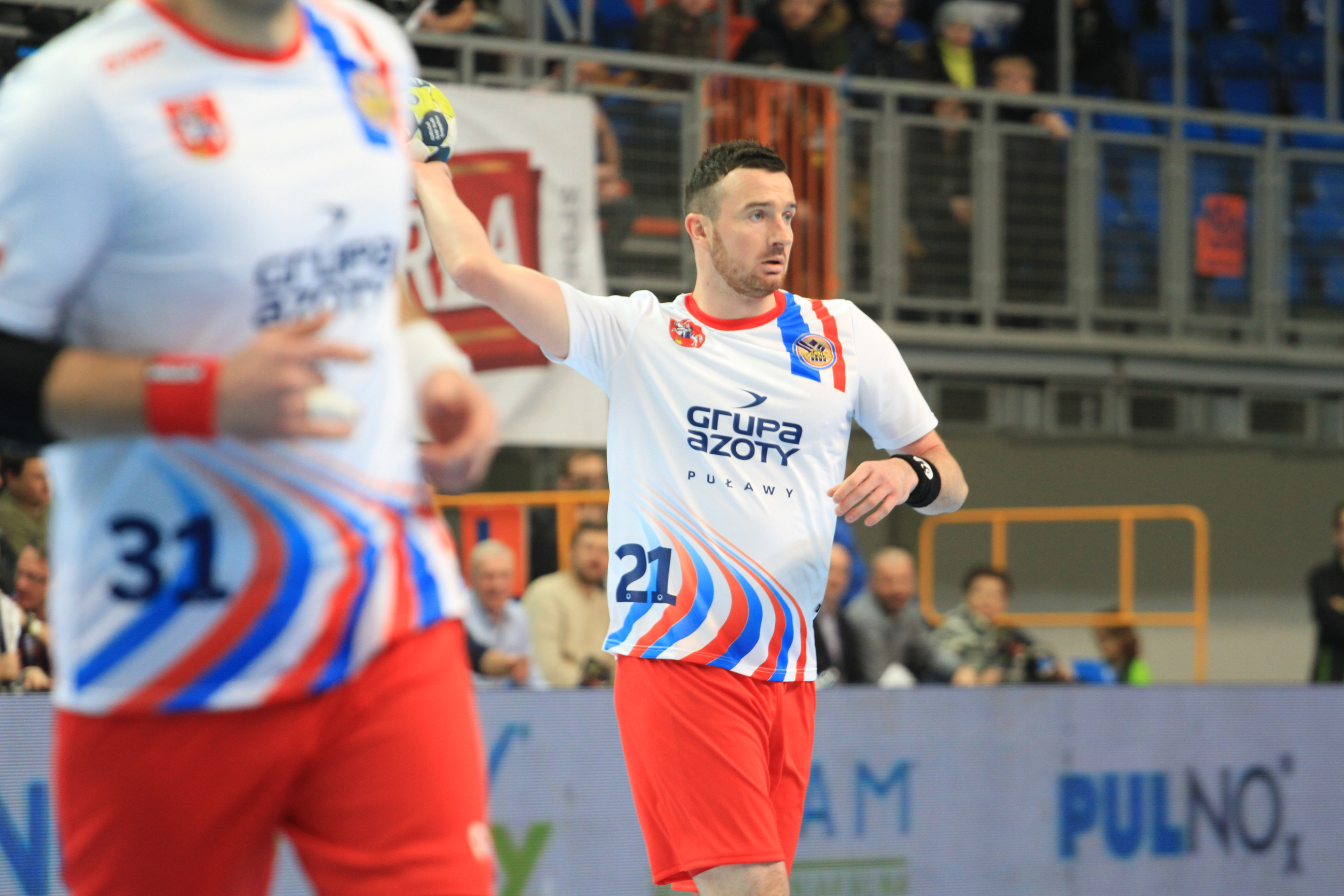

Personal information
- Nationality: Polish
- Born: 20 February 1988 (age 38) Płock, Poland
- Height: 1.92 m (6 ft 4 in)

Sport
- Sport: Handball
- Position: Centre back
- Current club: Atomix-haacht
- Number: 21
National team
| Years | Team | Apps | (Gls) |
| 2013–2019 | Poland | 34 | (25) |
Medal record
World Championship
| Bronze medal – third place | 2015 Qatar |

Piotr Masłowski (born 20 February 1988) is a Polish handball player for Atomix-haacht.

== Sporting achievements ==
=== State awards ===
- 2015 Silver Cross of Merit
