= Przemysław Krajewski =

Polish handball player (born 1987)

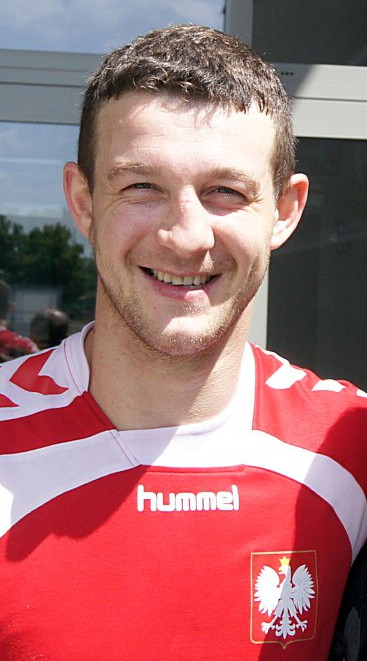

Personal information
- Nationality: Polish
- Born: 20 January 1987 (age 39) Ciechanów, Poland
- Height: 1.84 m (6 ft 0 in)

Sport
- Sport: Handball
- Position: Left wing
- Current club: Wisła Płock
- Number: 26

Youth career
- Years: Team
- 1997–2002: Czarni Regimin

Senior clubs
- Years: Team
- 2002–2009: Jurand Ciechanów
- 2009–2012: MKS Nielba Wągrowiec
- 2012–2017: KS Azoty-Puławy
- 2017–: Wisła Płock
National team
| Years | Team | Apps | (Gls) |
| 2012–2023 | Poland | 128 | (293) |
Medal record
World Championship
| Bronze medal – third place | 2015 Qatar |

Przemysław Krajewski (born 20 January 1987) is a Polish handball player for Wisła Płock.

He was a bronze medalist of the 2015 World Championship.

== Career ==
=== National team ===
On 1 February 2015, Poland, including Krajewski, won the bronze medal of the 2015 World Championship. In the winning bronze medal match (29:28) Poland beat Spain in extra time. He also participated at the 2016 Summer Olympics in Rio de Janeiro, in the men's handball tournament.

== Sporting achievements ==
=== State awards ===
- 2015 Silver Cross of Merit
