= 2018–19 BENE-League Handball =

2018–19 BENE-League season
- League: BENE-League
- Sport: Handball
- Duration: September 2018–13 March 2019
- Games: 80
- Teams: 12; Belgium (6 team); Netherlands (6 team)

Regular season
- Top scorer: (Netherlands) Bart Köhlen (144 goals)

Final Four
- Finals champions: (Belgium) Achilles Bocholt
- Runners-up: (Belgium) HC Visé BM

BENE-League seasons
- 2017–18 2019–20

The BENE-League Handball 2018-19 was the sixth edition of the multi-national handball competition between Belgium and the Netherlands.

Achilles Bocholt were defending champions.

== Clubs ==
Country	Team	City	Venue
Belgium	Achilles Bocholt	Bocholt	Sportcomplex De Damburg
Belgium	Hubo Initia Hasselt	Hasselt	Sporthal Alverberg
Belgium	KV Sasja HC	Hoboken	Sporthal Sorghvliedt
Belgium	Sporting NeLo	Neerpelt	Dommelhof
Belgium	Handbal Tongeren	Tongeren	Eburons Dôme
Belgium	HC Visé BM	Visé	Hall Omnisports de Visé
Netherlands	Green Park Handbal Aalsmeer	Aalsmeer	Sporthal De Bloemhof
Netherlands	Herpertz/Bevo HC	Panningen	SportArena De Heuf
Netherlands	JD Techniek/Hurry-Up	Zwartemeer	Succes Holidayparcs Arena
Netherlands	OCI Nitrogen-LIONS	Sittard-Geleen	Stadssporthal Sittard
Netherlands	Wematrans/Quintus	Kwintsheul	Eekhout Hal
Netherlands	KRAS/Volendam	Volendam	Sporthal de Opperdam

Location of teams in 2019–20 BENE-League (Belgium)
Location of teams in 2019–20 BENE-League (Netherlands)

== Rangking ==
Pos	Team	Pld	W	D	L	GF	GA	GD	Pts	Opmerking
1	(Belgium) Achilles Bocholt	22	19	2	1	738	635	+103	40	Qualified for the Final4
2	(Belgium) HC Visé BM	22	17	2	3	657	597	+60	36	Qualified for the Final4
3	(Netherlands) OCI Nitrogen-LIONS	22	14	1	7	647	548	+99	29	Qualified for the Final4
4	(Netherlands) Green Park Handbal Aalsmeer	22	13	2	7	657	606	+51	28	Qualified for the Final4
5	(Netherlands) Herpertz/Bevo HC	22	12	3	7	674	628	+46	27	
6	(Netherlands) KRAS/Volendam	22	11	2	9	627	596	+31	24	
7	(Belgium) Sporting NeLo	22	10	1	11	609	602	+7	21	
8	(Netherlands) JD Techniek/Hurry-Up	22	8	1	13	639	651	−12	17	Promotion/relegation matches Netherlands
9	(Belgium) Handbal Tongeren	22	7	2	13	584	603	−19	16	
10	(Belgium) Hubo Initia Hasselt	22	7	2	13	606	656	−50	16	Promotion/relegation matches Belgium
11	(Belgium) KV Sasja HC	22	3	1	18	559	689	−130	7	Promotion/relegation matches Belgium
12	(Netherlands) Wematrans/Quintus	22	1	1	20	533	719	−186	3	Relegated to Dutch Eredivisie

Source: NHV Uitslagen/standen

Home \ Away	AAL	BEV	BOC	HAS	HUR	LIO	NEL	QUI	SAS	TON	VIS	VOL
Green Park/Aalsmeer		25–31	31–33	35–26	33–30	28–24	31–27	37–23	28–21	33–23	35–31	35–26
Herpertz/Bevo HC	24–24		29–36	31–28	30–31	31–32	36–26	27–23	37–22	35–24	30–33	34–29
Achilles Bocholt	37–34	29–33		33–24	32–29	31–31	38–32	34–22	39–27	24–23	33–31	31–30
Hubo Initia Hasselt	26–26	30–29	28–42		23–26	21–27	25–24	25–24	29–25	26–26	32–35	24–31
JD Techniek/Hurry-Up	31–32	38–26	28–35	30–33		30–27	24–27	29–30	37–27	27–27	27–28	28–23
OCI Nitrogen-LIONS	19–20	34–17	30–34	30–24	38–26		24–20	38–21	36–26	20–21	27–28	32–27
Sporting NeLo	37–26	27–34	31–36	39–37	33–24	15–25		37–23	34–17	24–23	25–25	19–21
Wematrans/Quintus	22–30	28–41	29–33	25–37	24–33	27–36	29–30		24–24	22–27	21–23	21–35
KV Sasja HC	30–29	25–34	31–35	32–26	27–31	26–35	23–26	30–21		22–32	26–29	23–30
Handbal Tongeren	35–41	27–28	30–38	22–29	30–22	25–29	23–28	33–19	30–27		26–31	26–25
HC Visé BM	31–26	29–29	27–30	32–30	34–27	24–23	31–23	37–26	33–21	25–24		28–25
KRAS/Volendam	19–18	28–28	25–25	32–23	32–31	26–30	27–25	43–29	34–27	28–27	31–32	

Source: NHV BENE-League Heren Regulier Uitslagen
Legend: Blue = home team win; Yellow = draw; Red = away team win.

== Final Four ==
=== Semifinals ===
30 March 2019; 13:30 CEST (UTC+02:00)	Achilles Bocholt (Belgium)	35–28	(Netherlands) Green Park Handbal Aalsmeer	Lotto Arena, Antwerp

30 March 2019; 16:30 CEST (UTC+02:00)	HC Visé BM (Belgium)	42–39 (ET)	(Netherlands) OCI-Nitrogen-LIONS	Lotto Arena, Antwerp

=== Match for third place ===
31 March 2019; 13:30 CEST (UTC+02:00)	Green Park Handbal Aalsmeer (Netherlands)	22–28	(Netherlands) OCI-Nitrogen-LIONS	Lotto Arena, Antwerp

=== Final ===
31 March 2019; 16:00 CEST (UTC+02:00)	Achilles Bocholt (Belgium)	30–27	(Belgium) HC Visé BM	Lotto Arena, Antwerp

== Awards ==
- Goalkeeper: Rudi Schenk (NED)
- Right wing: Sérgio Rola (POR)
- Right back: Serge Spooren (BEL)
- Centre back: Vaidas Trainavicius (LTU)
- Left back: Quinten Colman (BEL)
- Left wing: Damian Kedziora (BEL)
- Pivot: Yves Vancosen (BEL)
