= 2020–21 BENE-League Handball =

2020–21 BENE-League season
- League: BENE-League
- Sport: Handball
- Duration: 3 September 2020–20 March 2020
- Games: 136
- Teams: 11; Belgium (6 team); Netherlands (5 team)
- TV partner: handbalnl.tv

Regular season

Final Four

BENE-League seasons
- 2019–20 2021–22

The BENE-League Handball 2020-21 was the sixth edition of the multi-national handball competition between Belgium and the Netherlands.

Achilles Bocholt were defending champions.

After the early ending of the BENE-League competition due to the COVID-19 pandemic, has the Dutch team of Handbal Houten has withdrawn from the BENE-League season 2020/2021. This has made a ticket available for the Dutch team. The top 3 of the Dutch Eredivisie (Wematrans/Quintus, Oosting/E&O and Anytime Fitness/BFC) have been asked to be promoted to the BENE-League. The three clubs refused this. The committee of the BENE-League have decide the competition play what 11 teams.

== Clubs ==
Country	Team	City	Venue
Belgium	Sezoens Achilles Bocholt	Bocholt	Sportcomplex De Damburg
Belgium	HC AtomiX	Haacht	Sporthal Den Dijk
Belgium	Hubo Initia Hasselt	Hasselt	Sporthal Alverberg
Belgium	Sporting Pelt	Neerpelt	Dommelhof
Belgium	Handbal Tongeren	Tongeren	Eburons Dôme
Belgium	HC Visé BM	Visé	Hall Omnisports de Visé
Netherlands	Green Park Handbal Aalsmeer	Aalsmeer	Sporthal De Bloemhof
Netherlands	Herpertz Bevo HC	Panningen	SportArena De Heuf
Netherlands	JD Techniek/Hurry-Up	Zwartemeer	Succes Holidayparcs Arena
Netherlands	KEMBIT-LIONS	Sittard-Geleen	Stadssporthal Sittard
Netherlands	KRAS/Volendam	Volendam	Sporthal de Opperdam

Location of teams in 2019–20 BENE-League (Belgium)

Location of teams in 2019–20 BENE-League (Netherlands)

== Rangking ==
Pos	Team	Pld	W	D	L	GF	GA	GD	Pts	Opmerking
1	(Belgium) Sezoens Achilles Bocholt	1	1	0	0	28	23	+5	2	~~Qualified for the Final4~~
2	(Belgium) HC AtomiX	1	1	0	0	34	30	+4	2	~~Qualified for the Final4~~
3	(Netherlands) Green Park Handbal Aalsmeer	0	0	0	0	0	0	0	0	~~Qualified for the Final4~~
4	(Netherlands) Herpertz Bevo HC	0	0	0	0	0	0	0	0	~~Qualified for the Final4~~
5	(Netherlands) JD Techniek/Hurry-Up	0	0	0	0	0	0	0	0	
6	(Belgium) Sporting Pelt	0	0	0	0	0	0	0	0	
7	(Netherlands) KEMBIT-LIONS	0	0	0	0	0	0	0	0	
8	(Belgium) HC Visé BM	0	0	0	0	0	0	0	0	
9	(Netherlands) KRAS/Volendam	0	0	0	0	0	0	0	0	
10	(Belgium) Handbal Tongeren	1	0	0	1	30	34	−4	0	
11	(Belgium) Hubo Initia Hasselt	1	0	0	1	23	28	−5	0	

Source: NHV Uitslagen/standen

Home \ Away	AAL	ATO	BEV	BOC	HAS	HUR	LIO	PEL	TON	VIS	VOL
Green Park Handbal Aalsmeer	—										
HC AtomiX		—							34–30		
Herpertz Bevo HC			—								
Sezoens Achilles Bocholt				—							
Hubo Initia Hasselt				23–28	—						
JD Techniek/Hurry-Up						—					
KEMBIT-LIONS							—				
Sporting Pelt								—			
Handbal Tongeren									—		
HC Visé BM										—	
KRAS/Volendam											—

Source: NHV Uitslagen/standen
Legend: Blue = home team win; Yellow = draw; Red = away team win.

== Final Four ==
=== Semifinals ===
No. 1	v	No. 4

No. 2	v	No. 3

=== Match for third place ===
Loser No.1/No.4	v	Loser No.2/No.3

=== Final ===
Winner No.1/No.4	v	Winner No.2/No.3
