= 2019–20 BENE-League Handball =

2019–20 BENE-League season
- League: BENE-League
- Sport: Handball
- Duration: 3 September 2019–20 March 2020
- Games: 136
- Teams: 12; Belgium (6 team); Netherlands (6 team)
- TV partner: handbalnl.tv

Regular season
- Season champions: (Belgium) Achilles Bocholt
- Top scorer: (Netherlands) Tommie Falke (150 goals)

Final Four
- Finals champions: (Belgium) Achilles Bocholt
- Runners-up: (Netherlands) KEMBIT-LIONS

BENE-League seasons
- 2018–19 2020–21

The BENE-League Handball 2019-20 was the sixth edition of the international handball competition between Belgium and the Netherlands.

Achilles Bocholt were defending champions.

Final four tournament was held at Maaspoort in 's-Hertogenbosch, the Netherlands, Due to the COVID-19 pandemic, the final four was not held. the final ranking of the competition is the final ranking of the regular competition.

== Clubs ==
Country	Team	City	Venue
Belgium	Achilles Bocholt	Bocholt	Sportcomplex De Damburg
Belgium	HC AtomiX	Haacht	Sporthal Den Dijk
Belgium	Hubo Initia Hasselt	Hasselt	Sporthal Alverberg
Belgium	Sporting Pelt	Neerpelt	Dommelhof
Belgium	Handbal Tongeren	Tongeren	Eburons Dôme
Belgium	HC Visé BM	Visé	Hall Omnisports de Visé
Netherlands	Green Park Handbal Aalsmeer	Aalsmeer	Sporthal De Bloemhof
Netherlands	Herpertz Bevo HC	Panningen	SportArena De Heuf
Netherlands	The Dome/Handbal Houten	Houten	Sportcentrum The Dome
Netherlands	JD Techniek/Hurry-Up	Zwartemeer	Succes Holidayparcs Arena
Netherlands	KEMBIT-LIONS	Sittard-Geleen	Stadssporthal Sittard
Netherlands	KRAS/Volendam	Volendam	Sporthal de Opperdam

Location of teams in 2019–20 BENE-League (Belgium)

Location of teams in 2019–20 BENE-League (Netherlands)

== Rangking ==
Pos	Team	Pld	W	D	L	GF	GA	GD	Pts	Opmerking
1	(Belgium) Achilles Bocholt	22	20	1	1	737	569	+168	41	~~Qualified for the Final4~~
2	(Netherlands) KEMBIT-LIONS	22	15	2	5	690	604	+86	32	~~Qualified for the Final4~~
3	(Netherlands) Herpertz Bevo HC	22	15	2	5	659	605	+54	32	~~Qualified for the Final4~~
4	(Belgium) HC Visé BM	22	12	5	5	674	611	+63	29	~~Qualified for the Final4~~
5	(Belgium) Sporting Pelt	22	14	1	7	673	624	+49	29	
6	(Belgium) Handbal Tongeren	22	9	2	11	648	668	−20	20	
7	(Netherlands) JD Techniek/Hurry-Up	22	9	2	11	613	639	−26	20	
8	(Netherlands) Green Park Handbal Aalsmeer	22	9	1	12	639	646	−7	19	
9	(Belgium) Hubo Initia Hasselt	22	7	2	13	600	632	−32	16	~~Promotion/relegation matches Belgium~~
10	(Netherlands) KRAS/Volendam	22	7	0	15	610	638	−28	14	~~Promotion/relegation matches Netherlands~~
11	(Netherlands) The Dome/Handbal Houten	22	3	0	19	583	735	−152	6	~~Promotion/relegation matches Netherlands~~
12	(Belgium) HC AtomiX	22	3	0	19	573	728	−155	6	~~Promotion/relegation matches Belgium~~

Source: NHV Uitslagen/standen

Home \ Away	AAL	ATO	BEV	BOC	HAS	HOU	HUR	LIO	PEL	TON	VIS	VOL
Green Park Handbal Aalsmeer		27–20	25–30	23–30	24–34	24–28	33–29	26–30	34–29	34–22	29–29	34–29
HC AtomiX	26–32		26–27	24–37	30–24	30–23	26–27	17–40	26–38	23–33	25–33	30–39
Herpertz Bevo HC	33–28	41–27		30–30	32–27	37–21	32–26	26–35	28–29	30–29	28–31	28–26
Achilles Bocholt	37–32	42–25	19–22		30–21	37–21	37–32	30–22	36–26	33–27	40–32	27–26
Hubo Initia Hasselt	26–23	37–30	27–29	30–37		30–28	26–25	30–31	25–25	25–27	24–27	34–29
The Dome/Handbal Houten	26–37	25–30	27–28	23–36	28–31		26–38	25–33	38–37	31–36	27–34	32–27
JD Techniek/Hurry-Up	32–35	24–23	27–33	25–38	27–27	37–29		30–29	30–23	30–31	29–29	27–24
KEMBIT-LIONS	36–29	37–27	29–29	26–35	27–25	36–22	33–19		30–27	32–26	34–34	28–27
Sporting Pelt	31–29	36–22	31–29	24–25	34–30	37–30	27–19	28–30		35–29	24–20	31–27
Handbal Tongeren	29–28	38–24	26–29	25–36	31–22	32–28	31–29	28–35	35–42		35–35	27–28
HC Visé BM	32–20	31–30	31–29	25–29	29–20	40–21	27–29	33–27	31–36	28–28		35–22
KRAS/Volendam	28–33	37–32	28–29	28–36	29–25	28–24	20–22	31–30	21–23	31–23	25–28	

Source: NHV Uitslagen/standen
Legend: Blue = home team win; Yellow = draw; Red = away team win.

== Final Four ==
=== Semifinals ===
14 March 2020; 15:00 CEST (UTC+02:00)	Achilles Bocholt (Belgium)	v	(Belgium) HC Visé BM	Maaspoort, s'-Hertogebosch

14 March 2020; 17:30 CEST (UTC+02:00)	KEMBIT-LIONS (Netherlands)	v	(Netherlands) Herpertz Bevo HC	Maaspoort, s'-Hertogebosch

=== Match for third place ===
15 March 2020; CEST (UTC+02:00)	Loser BOC/VIS	v	Loser LIO/BEV	Maaspoort, s'-Hertogebosch

=== Final ===
15 March 2020; 16:00 CEST (UTC+02:00)	Winner BOC/VIS	v	Winner LIO/BEV	Maaspoort, s'-Hertogebosch

== Awards ==
The all-star team was announced on 6 September 2020.

- Goalkeeper: Clem Leroy (BEL)
- Right wing: Bart Köhlen (NED)
- Right back: Serge Spooren (BEL)
- Centre back: Dario Polman (NED)
- Left back: João Jacob Ramos (POR)
- Left wing: Tommie Falke (NED)
- Pivot: Yves Vancosen (BEL)
