= 2021–22 BENE-League Handball =

2021–22 BENE-League season
- League: BENE-League
- Sport: Handball
- Duration: 4 September 2021–27 March 2022
- Games: 124
- Teams: 12; Belgium (6 team); Netherlands (6 team)
- TV partner: eyecons.com

Regular season
- Season champions: KEMBIT-LIONS
- Top scorer: (Belgium) Serge Spooren (154)

Final Four
- Finals champions: KEMBIT-LIONS
- Runners-up: Sezoens Achilles Bocholt
- Finals MVP: (Netherlands) Ids Eussen

BENE-League seasons
- 2020–21 2022–23

The BENE-League Handball 2020-21 was the sixth edition of the multi-national handball competition between Belgium and the Netherlands.

KEMBIT-LIONS won for the second time the BENE-League.

== Clubs ==
Country	Team	City	Venue
Belgium	Sezoens Achilles Bocholt	Bocholt	Sportcomplex De Damburg
Belgium	HC AtomiX	Haacht	Sporthal Den Dijk
Belgium	Hubo Initia Hasselt	Hasselt	Sporthal Alverberg
Belgium	Sporting Pelt	Neerpelt	Dommelhof
Belgium	Handbal Tongeren	Tongeren	Eburons Dôme
Belgium	HC Visé BM	Visé	Hall Omnisports de Visé
Netherlands	Green Park Handbal Aalsmeer	Aalsmeer	Sporthal De Bloemhof
Netherlands	Herpertz/Bevo HC	Panningen	SportArena De Heuf
Netherlands	JD Techniek/Hurry-Up	Zwartemeer	Succes Holidayparcs Arena
Netherlands	KEMBIT-LIONS	Sittard-Geleen	Stadssporthal Sittard
Netherlands	Quintus	Kwintsheul	Eekhout hal
Netherlands	KRAS/Volendam	Volendam	Sporthal de Opperdam

Location of teams in 2021–22 BENE-League (Belgium)

Location of teams in 2021–22 BENE-League (Netherlands)

== Regular season ==
=== Standings ===
Pos	Team	Pld	W	D	L	GF	GA	GD	Pts	Qualification
1	(Belgium) Sezoens Achilles Bocholt	22	18	1	3	733	577	+156	37	Qualified for Final4
2	(Netherlands) KEMBIT-LIONS	22	17	2	3	701	606	+95	36	Qualified for Final4
3	(Netherlands) Green Park Handbal Aalsmeer	22	16	1	5	698	608	+90	33	Qualified for Final4
4	(Belgium) Sporting Pelt	22	15	1	6	697	611	+86	31	Qualified for Final4
5	(Netherlands) KRAS/Volendam	22	13	3	6	657	634	+23	29	
6	(Belgium) HC Visé BM	22	9	5	8	651	628	+23	23	
7	(Netherlands) Herpertz/Bevo HC	22	8	3	11	676	656	+20	19	
8	(Netherlands) JD Techniek/Hurry-Up	22	8	3	11	652	633	+19	19	
9	(Belgium) Handbal Tongeren	22	8	2	12	641	660	−19	18	
10	(Belgium) Hubo Initia Hasselt	22	4	0	18	526	681	−155	8	
11	(Netherlands) Quintus	22	3	0	19	554	710	−156	6	
12	(Belgium) HC AtomiX	22	2	1	19	594	776	−182	5	

Source: NHV Standing

=== Results ===
Home \ Away	AAL	ATO	BEV	BOC	HAS	HUR	LIO	PEL	QUI	TON	VIS	VOL
Green Park Handbal Aalsmeer (Netherlands)		46–26	32–26	31–30	39–16	30–26	28–28	29–34	40–24	35–27	30–28	27–28
HC AtomiX (Belgium)	23–31		24–42	19–31	24–31	25–41	36–39	30–34	29–32	32–35	33–33	28–32
Herpertz/Bevo HC (Netherlands)	29–32	39–27		27–27	32–23	34–30	31–35	29–34	33–25	30–30	33–35	35–35
Sezoens Achilles Bocholt (Belgium)	34–27	36–23	37–26		35–16	36–25	31–34	37–28	39–23	29–25	31–24	35–31
Hubo Initia Hasselt (Belgium)	31–34	27–32	20–32	29–36		22–31	24–31	22–40	32–27	32–30	22–28	30–31
JD Techniek/Hurry-Up (Netherlands)	22–25	30–25	38–35	32–33	27–20		31–27	26–28	32–22	27–27	30–30	34–39
KEMBIT-LIONS (Netherlands)	35–28	42–20	32–21	28–36	24–19	31–30		36–29	32–23	31–27	31–30	39–28
Sporting Pelt (Belgium)	31–28	37–30	24–18	27–31	35–18	26–26	25–28		43–23	30–28	39–29	33–28
Quintus (Netherlands)	29–34	29–22	30–37	23–35	20–28	26–33	26–33	24–25		26–34	21–24	22–35
Handbal Tongeren (Belgium)	31–34	37–25	31–30	23–32	28–21	33–30	26–29	25–34	32–35		21–28	27–31
HC Visé BM (Belgium)	24–31	40–28	24–28	23–30	34–23	36–30	28–28	34–30	33–21	34–36		30–30
KRAS/Volendam (Netherlands)	26–27	32–33	31–29	33–32	31–20	23–21	29–28	32–31	25–23	25–28	22–22	

Source: NHV Results
Legend: Blue = home team win; Yellow = draw; Red = away team win.

== Final Four ==
=== Semifinals ===
Sezoens Achilles Bocholt	29 – 24	Sporting Pelt

KEMBIT-LIONS	37 – 36 (a.e.t.)	Green Park Handbal Aalsmeer

=== Final ===
Sezoens Achilles Bocholt	22 – 29	KEMBIT-LIONS
