= Super Handball League Men =

BENE-League
- Current season, competition or edition: 2024–25 BENE-League Handball
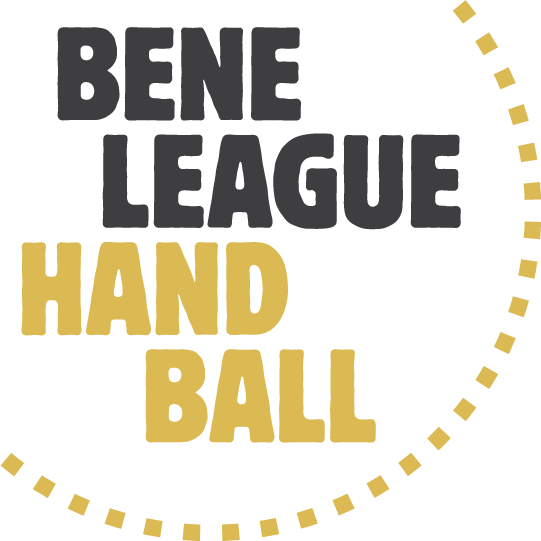
- Sport: Handball
- Founded: 2008
- No. of teams: 11
- Country: Belgium; Netherlands; Luxembourg (former)
- Confederation: EHF
- Most recent champion: KEMBIT-LIONS
- Most titles: Achilles Bocholt (5 titles)
- Level on pyramid: 1
- Website: Website

The Super Handball League Men is a multinational handball competition for men's teams from Belgium and the Netherlands, which started in January 2008 under the name BENE-LIGA. Between 2010 and 2014, Luxembourg teams also participated in the tournament that was then called Benelux League.

== History ==
The idea of setting up a collaboration between the Belgian and Dutch top clubs dates back to the 1980s. However, as in many other sports, it was mainly talked about. However, in 2006 it all became more concrete. A system was devised to better frame the friendly matches from the preparation period, and a knock-out system was set up: quarter-finals in round-trip matches between the top 4 from Belgium and the Netherlands, and the winners would compete in a Final 4. At the end of 2007 it was announced that eight teams from the Netherlands and Belgium would compete against each other. The goal was to start a full Bene Liga competition in 2010 with more teams from the Low Countries.

The first edition of the Bene Liga was played in 2008 as a kind of cup formula. On the Belgian side, the first was kicked off by Initia Hasselt, Tongeren, Neerpelt and KV Sasja HC. Volendam, Aalsmeer, Hellas and Bevo HC from the Netherlands took part. The start of the BENE-Liga was, symbolically, announced in Baarle-Hertog. Evert ten Napel, a well-known Dutch sports reporter led the press conference. In the first edition of the BENE-Liga, KV Sasja became champion.

== 2023–24 season ==
Below is the list of clubs that are members of the 2023–24 BENE-League Handball season.

Country	Team	City	Venue
Belgium	Sezoens Achilles Bocholt	Bocholt	Sportcomplex De Damburg
Belgium	KTSV Eupen	Eupen	Sportcentrum Eupen
Belgium	Filou Izegem	Izegem	Sporthal De Krekel
Belgium	Hubo Handbal	Hasselt, Tongeren	Sporthal Alverberg (Hasselt), Eburons Dôme (Tongeren)
Belgium	Sporting Pelt	Neerpelt	Dommelhof
Belgium	HC Visé BM	Visé	Hall Omnisports de Visé
Netherlands	Green Park/Aalsmeer	Aalsmeer	Sporthal De Bloemhof
Netherlands	Herpertz/BEVO HC	Panningen	SportArena De Heuf
Netherlands	Handbal Houten	Houten	Sportcentrum The Dome
Netherlands	Drenth Groep/Hurry Up	Zwartemeer	Succes Holidayparcs Arena
Netherlands	KEMBIT-LIONS	Sittard-Geleen	Stadssporthal Sittard
Netherlands	KRAS/Volendam	Volendam	Sporthal de Opperdam

Below is the list of winners, finalists and other participants of Final Four BENE-League tournaments.

Year	Host	Final			Match for third place		
Year	Host	Champion	Score	Second Place	Third Place	Score	Fourth Place
2008; Details	Lommel	(Belgium); KV Sasja HC	24-31	(Netherlands); Eurotech/Bevo HC	(Belgium); Initia Hasselt	31–29	(Belgium); United HC Tongeren
2008–09; Details	Tongeren	(Netherlands); FIQAS/Aalsmeer	33-27	(Netherlands); KRAS/Volendam	(Belgium); Initia Hasselt	29-27	(Belgium); KV Sasja HC
2009–10; Details	Luxembourg City	(Netherlands); KRAS/Volendam	33-30	(Belgium); Achilles Bocholt	(Netherlands); Pals groep/E&O	34-33	(Belgium); United HC Tongeren
2010–11; Details	Hoboken	(Netherlands); KRAS/Volendam	32-29	(Luxembourg); HC Berchem	(Belgium); United HC Tongeren	32-22	(Belgium); Initia Hasselt
2011–12; Details	Volendam	(Netherlands); KRAS/Volendam	30-24	(Belgium); Initia Hasselt	(Belgium); United HC Tongeren	33-23	(Netherlands); OCI-LIONS
2012–13; Details	Houthalen-Helchteren	(Belgium); Achilles Bocholt	35-29	(Netherlands); KRAS/Volendam	(Belgium); Initia Hasselt	30-29	(Netherlands); Kremer/Hurry-Up
2013–14; Details	Differdange	(Belgium); Initia Hasselt	31-18	(Netherlands); OCI-LIONS	(Belgium); HC Achilles Bocholt	31-28	(Netherlands); KRAS/Volendam
2014–15; Details	Hasselt	(Netherlands); OCI-LIONS	27-25	(Netherlands); Targos Bevo HC	(Belgium); United HC Tongeren	24–22	(Belgium); Hubo I. Hasselt
2015–16; Details	Sittard	(Belgium); Hubo I. Hasselt	35-34	(Netherlands); OCI-LIONS	(Netherlands); Targos Bevo HC	32-22	(Belgium); QubiQ A. Bocholt
2016–17; Details	Hasselt	(Belgium); Achilles Bocholt	38-37	(Netherlands); OCI-LIONS	(Belgium); Callant Tongeren	32-22	(Belgium); Hubo I. Hasselt
2017–18; Details	's-Hertogenbosch	(Belgium); Achilles Bocholt	34-31	(Netherlands); OCI-LIONS	(Netherlands); FIQAS/Aalsmeer	29-28	(Belgium); Hubo I. Hasselt
2018–19; Details	Antwerp	(Belgium); Achilles Bocholt	35-34	(Belgium); HC Visé BM	(Netherlands); OCI-LIONS	32-22	(Netherlands); Green Park/Aalsmeer
2019–20; Details	~~'s-Hertogenbosch~~	(Belgium); Achilles Bocholt		(Netherlands); KEMBIT-LIONS	(Netherlands); Herpertz Bevo HC		(Belgium); HC Visé BM
2020–21; Details		Season canceled					
2021–22; Details	's-Hertogenbosch	(Netherlands); KEMBIT-LIONS	29-22	(Belgium); Sezoens Achilles Bocholt	Match for third place between Sporting Pelt and Green Park/Aalsmeer has not played.		
2022–23; Details	Bocholt	(Belgium); Sezoens Achilles Bocholt	37-30	(Netherlands); KEMBIT-LIONS	Match for third place between Sporting Pelt and Green Park/Aalsmeer has not played.		

=== Hosts ===
Year	Final four host	Hall	Date
2008	(Belgium) Lommel	Sportcentrum de Soeverein	30 Juny–1 July 2008
2008–09	(Belgium) Tongeren	Eburons Dôme	30-31 May 2009
2009–10	Luxembourg City	Coque Sport Cente	20-21 February 2010
2010–11	(Belgium) Hoboken	Sporthal Sport VIII	26-27 February 2011
2011–12	(Netherlands) Volendam	Sporthal de Opperdam	3-4 March 2012
2012–13	(Belgium) Houthalen-Helchteren	Sportpark Lakerveld	?
2013–14	(Luxembourg) Differdange	Differdange Sports Center	?
2014–15	(Belgium) Hasselt	Sporthal de Alverberg	7-8 February 2015
2015–16	(Netherlands) Sittard	Topsporthal Fitland XL Sittard	6-7 February 2016
2016–17	(Belgium) Hasselt	Sporthal de Alverberg	25-26 February 2017
2017–19	(Netherlands) 's-Hertogenbosch	Maaspoort	17-18 March 2018
2018–19	(Netherlands) Antwerp	Lotto Arena	30-31 March 2019
2019–20	(Netherlands) 's-Hertogenbosch	Maaspoort	~~14-15 March 2020~~
2019–20	Season canceled		
2021–22	(Netherlands) 's-Hertogenbosch	Maaspoort	26-27 March 2022
2022–23	(Belgium) Bocholt	Sportcomplex De Damburg	18 March 2023

== Records and statistics ==
=== By club ===
Club	Won	Runner-up	Years won	Years runner-up
(Belgium) Bocholt	5	2	2013, 2017, 2018, 2019, 2020	2010, 2022
(Netherlands) Volendam	3	2	2010, 2011, 2012	2009, 2013
(Belgium) Hasselt	2	1	2014, 2016	2012
(Netherlands) Limburg Lions	2	5	2015, 2022	2014, 2016, 2017, 2018, 2020
(Netherlands) Aalsmeer	1	0	2009	
(Belgium) Sasja	1	0	2008	
(Netherlands) Bevo HC	0	2		2008, 2014
(Luxembourg) Berchem	0	1		2011
(Belgium) HC Visé BM	0	1		2019

=== By country ===
Club / Nation	Won	Runner-up	Finals
Belgium	8	4	11
Netherlands	6	9	14
Luxembourg	0	1	1
Total	13	13	26
