= Tatabánya KC in European handball =

Hungarian handball club

Tatabánya KC is a Hungarian handball club, based in Tatabánya, Hungary.

== European record ==
As of 15 October 2019:

Competition	Seasons	Year(s) in the competition
EHF Champions League (Champions Cup)	3x	1979/80, 1980/81, 1985/86
EHF Cup (IHF Cup)	16x	1981/82, 1982/83, 1983/84, 1989/90, 2004/05, 2005/06, 2010/11, 2011/12, 2012/13, 2013/14, 2014/15, 2015/16, 2016/17, 2017/18, 2018/19, 2019/20
EHF Cup Winners' Cup (defunct)	1x	1978/79
Source: kézitörténelem.hu	20 seasons	

== EHF-organised seasonal competitions ==
Tatabánya score listed first. As of 15 October 2019.

=== European Cup ===
Season	Round	Club	Home	Away	Aggregate
1979–80	Second round	(West Germany) TuS Hofweier	19-14	16-19	35–33
1979–80	Quarter-finals	(Czechoslovakia) Dukla Prague	19-18	21-23	40–41
1980–81	First round	(Turkey) Beşiktaş J.K.	49-16	41-28	90–44
1980–81	Second round	(Iceland) Víkingur Reykjavík	23-22	20-21	43–43 (a)
1985–86	First round	(Greece) A.C. Ionikos	36-11	41-20	77–31
1985–86	Second round	(Czechoslovakia) Dukla Prague	24-24	23-29	47–53

=== EHF Cup ===
Season	Round	Club	Home	Away	Aggregate
1981–82	Round of 16	(East Germany) SC Leipzig	30-23	20-27	50–50 (a)
1982–83	Round of 16	(Switzerland) RTV Basel	32-30	27-22	59–52
1982–83	Quarter-finals	(Soviet Union) IL Zaporizhia	26-26	18-29	44–55
1983–84	Round of 16	(Sweden) Ystads IF	32-18	21-28	53–46
1983–84	Quarter-finals	(Iceland) FH	35-27	20-19	55–46
1983–84	Semi-finals	(West Germany) TV Großwallstadt	23-22	20-22	43–44
1989–90	First round	(Czechoslovakia) Dukla Prague	22-20	25-38	47–58
2004–05	Second round	(Luxembourg) HB Esch	38-20	34-30	72–50
2004–05	Third round	(France) US Dunkerque HB	31-27	23-36	54–63
2005–06	Second round	(Belarus) SKA Minsk	33-22	36-30	69–52
2005–06	Third round	(Switzerland) Wacker Thun	30-27	31-37	61–64
2010–11	Third round	(Bosnia and Herzegovina) RK Borac m:tel Banja Luka	29-21	25-23	54–44
2010–11	Round of 16	(Spain) Naturhouse La Rioja	30-25	26-39	56–64
2011–12	Second round	(Greece) A.C. PAOK	29-25	27-23	56–48
2011–12	Third round	(Germany) Frisch Auf Göppingen	26-28	25-34	51–62
2012–13	Second round	(Norway) Elverum Håndball	23-27	23-32	46–59
2013–14	First qualifying round	(Belgium) Achilles Bocholt	30-22	35-30	65–52
2013–14	Second qualifying round	(Sweden) Lugi HF	20-24	27-27	47–51
2014–15	Second qualifying round	(Luxembourg) Handball Esch	25-25	25-24	50–49
2014–15	Third qualifying round	(Russia) St. Petersburg HC	23-22	24-32	47–53
2015–16	Third qualifying round	(Sweden) Ystads IF	20-31	28-28	48–59
2016–17	Third qualifying round	(Israel) Maccabi Srugo Rishon LeZion	35-23	28-26	63–49
2016–17	Group stage (Group C)	(Denmark) KIF Kolding København	28-26	29-26	2nd
2016–17	Group stage (Group C)	(Germany) SC Magdeburg	28-31	25-30	2nd
2016–17	Group stage (Group C)	(Israel) Maccabi Castro Tel Aviv	27-24	24-20	2nd
2016–17	Quarter-finals	(Germany) Füchse Berlin	25-30	22-28	47–58
2017–18	Third qualifying round	(France) Chambéry Savoie Mont-Blanc HB	25-24	21-23	46–47
2018–19	Third qualifying round	(Netherlands) OCI-Lions	31-18	27-27	58–45
2018–19	Group stage (Group B)	(Germany) TSV Hannover-Burgdorf	28-25	27-27	1st
2018–19	Group stage (Group B)	(North Macedonia) Eurofarm Rabotnik	30-27	31-21	1st
2018–19	Group stage (Group B)	(Croatia) Nexe Našice	27-28	29-26	1st
2018–19	Quarter-finals	(Denmark) TTH Holstebro	26-23	24-29	50–52
2019–20	Third qualifying round	(Ukraine) ZTR Zaporizhia	27-24	26-27	53–51
2019–20	Group stage (Group D)	(France) PAUC Handball	24-24	22-26	
2019–20	Group stage (Group D)	(Germany) Füchse Berlin	-	27-27	
2019–20	Group stage (Group D)	(Spain) BM Logroño La Rioja	26-25		
2020–21	Group stage (Group D)	(North Macedonia) HC Eurofarm Pelister	21–24	19–21	6th
2020–21	Group stage (Group D)	(Germany) Rhein-Neckar Löwen	26–32	30–37	6th
2020–21	Group stage (Group D)	(Slovenia) RK Trimo Trebnje	26–28	28–32	6th
2020–21	Group stage (Group D)	(Switzerland) Kadetten Schaffhausen	30–32	23–27	6th
2020–21	Group stage (Group D)	(Denmark) GOG	32–35	28–30	6th
2021–22	Group stage (Group D)	(Greece) AEK Athens HC	25–24	26–34	6th
2021–22	Group stage (Group D)	(Portugal) Sporting CP	23–37	26–34	6th
2021–22	Group stage (Group D)	(Switzerland) Kadetten Schaffhausen	31–23	26–32	6th
2021–22	Group stage (Group D)	(North Macedonia) HC Eurofarm Pelister	25–21	20–33	6th
2021–22	Group stage (Group D)	(France) USAM Nîmes Gard	30–38	22–24	6th
Did not participate in European competition in 2022–23
2023–24	Group stage (Group H)	(Romania) CSM Constanța	24–29	25–28	3rd
2023–24	Group stage (Group H)	(Poland) KGHM Chrobry Głogów	37–24	30–25	3rd
2023–24	Group stage (Group H)	(Portugal) Sporting CP	31–29	28–36	3rd
2024–25	Group stage (Group G)	(Czech Republic) HCB Karviná	28–27	31–31	2nd
2024–25	Group stage (Group G)	(Croatia) MRK Sesvete	28–25	31–27	2nd
2024–25	Group stage (Group G)	(Germany) SG Flensburg-Handewitt	29–39	27–44	2nd
2024–25	Main round (Group IV)	(France) Fenix Toulouse Handball	31–33	28–35	4th
2024–25	Main round (Group IV)	(Germany) VfL Gummersbach	29–44	27–33	4th
2025–26; Finalist	Round 2	(Norway) Nærbø IL	33–27	30–32	63–59
2025–26; Finalist	Round 3	(Switzerland) HSC Suhr Aarau	40–33	27–25	67–58
2025–26; Finalist	Last 16	(Norway) Runar Sandefjord	35–33	36–31	71–64
2025–26; Finalist	Quarter-finals	(Turkey) Nilüfer Belediyespor	31–31	37–35	68–66
2025–26; Finalist	Semi-finals	(Bosnia and Herzegovina) RK Izviđač	37–34	31–33	68–67
2025–26; Finalist	Final	(North Macedonia) GRK Ohrid	28–29	25–31	53–60

=== Cup Winners' Cup ===
From the 2012–13 season, the men's competition was merged with the EHF Cup.

Season	Round	Club	Home	Away	Aggregate
1978–79	Round of 16	(France) Saint Martin d'Heres	33-17	22-22	55–39
1978–79	Quarter-finals	(Iceland) Víkingur Reykjavík	wo.		
1978–79	Semi-finals	(West Germany) VfL Gummersbach	21-21	10-18	31–39
