= Belgium men's national handball team =

Belgium

Information
- Nickname: The Red Wolves
- Association: Royal Belgian Handball Federation (URBH)
- Coach: Yérime Sylla
- Assistant coach: Kevin Jacobs
- Captain: Serge Spooren

Colours
1st	2nd

Results

World Championship
- Appearances: 1 (First in 2023)
- Best result: 21st (2023)
- Last updated on Unknown.

The Belgium national handball team is the national team of Belgium. It is governed by the Royal Belgian Handball Federation and takes part in international handball competitions.

== World Championship record ==
- 2023 – 21st place

== Current squad ==
Squad for the 2023 World Men's Handball Championship.

Head coach: Yérime Sylla

No.	Pos.	Name	Date of birth (age)	Height	App.	Goals	Club
1	GK	Jef Lettens	12 August 1990 (age 36)	1.93 m	73	0	(France) Fenix Toulouse Handball
6	RW	Pierre Brixhe	28 January 1998 (age 28)	1.80 m	10	30	(Belgium) HC Visé BM
9	RB	Kobe Serras	1 April 2001 (age 25)	1.83 m	22	32	(Netherlands) Bevo HC
10	RB	Raphael Kötters	21 January 2001 (age 25)	1.94 m	15	22	(France) Istres Provence Handball
11	CB	Tom Robyns	14 May 1991 (age 35)	1.82 m	78	162	(France) Saran Loiret Handball
13	LW	Nick Braun	26 July 2000 (age 26)	1.81 m	15	30	(Germany) HSG Krefeld
14	RB	Serge Spooren	22 November 1993 (age 32)	1.89 m	37	76	(Belgium) HC Achilles Bocholt
15	LB	Quinten Colman	15 October 1996 (age 29)	1.90 m	22	33	(France) Dijon Métropole Handball
22	P	Yves Vancosen	22 May 1991 (age 35)	1.90 m	41	69	(Belgium) HC Visé BM
23	CB	Bartosz Kedziora	21 December 1990 (age 35)	1.89 m	28	59	(Belgium) KTSV Eupen
24	P	Simon Ooms	18 April 1994 (age 32)	2.00 m	41	85	(France) US Ivry Handball
26	LB	Sébastien Danesi	26 July 2000 (age 26)	1.87 m	12	25	(Belgium) HC Visé BM
29	LW	Yannick Glorieux	15 January 1996 (age 30)	1.84 m	8	38	(France) Villeurbanne Handball
30	RW	Ilyas D'hanis	17 January 1996 (age 30)	1.88 m	16	23	(Belgium) HC Achilles Bocholt
34	CB	Arber Qerimi	22 November 1990 (age 35)	1.80 m	59	120	(Belgium) Hubo Handbal
41	GK	Arthur Vanhove	8 December 2001 (age 24)	1.95 m	10	0	(Belgium) Hubo Handbal
42	P	Joris Gillé	19 April 1996 (age 30)	1.95 m	14	22	(Netherlands) Bevo HC
44	LB	Jeroen De Beule	2 March 1991 (age 35)	1.87 m	73	159	(Belgium) HC Achilles Bocholt
60	CB	Robbe Spooren	10 April 2001 (age 25)	1.80 m	6	2	(Belgium) Sporting Pelt
80	LB	Louis Delpire	7 December 1998 (age 27)	1.94 m	12	12	(Belgium) Sporting Pelt
