= Royal Belgian Handball Federation =

Governing body of handball in Belgium

Royal Belgian Handball Federation Dutch: Koninklijke Belgische Handbalbond French: Union Royale Belge de Handball German: Königlicher Belgischer Handballverband KBHB, URBH
- IOC nation: Kingdom of Belgium (BEL)
- Sport: Handball
- Other sports: Beach handball; Wheelchair Handball
- Official website: www.handball.be

HISTORY
- Year of formation: 1956; 70 years ago

AFFILIATIONS
- International federation: International Handball Federation (IHF)
- IHF member since: 1946
- Continental association: European Handball Federation
- National Olympic Committee: Belgian Olympic and Interfederal Committee

GOVERNING BODY
- President: Mr. Jean-François Hannosset (Belgium)

HEADQUARTERS
- Address: Dorpsstraat 74, Halen
- Country: Belgium
- Secretary General: Mr. Dries Boulet (Belgium)

The Royal Belgian Handball Federation (RBHF) (Dutch: Koninklijke Belgische Handbalbond (KBHB), French: Union Royale Belge de Handball (URBH), German: Königlicher Belgischer Handballverband (KBHV)) is the governing body of handball and beach handball in Kingdom of Belgium. Founded in 1956, the RBHF is affiliated to the International Handball Federation and European Handball Federation. RBHF is also affiliated to the Belgian Olympic and Interfederal Committee. It is based in Ans and Halen.

== URBH Competitions ==
- BENE-League Handball
- Belgian Men's 1st Division
- Belgian Women's 1st Division

== National teams ==
- Belgium men's national handball team
- Belgium men's national junior handball team
- Belgium men's national youth handball team
- Belgium women's national handball team
- Belgium women's national junior handball team
- Belgium women's national youth handball team
