= Belgian First Division (men's handball) =

- Current season, competition or edition: 2026–27 Belgian Eerste Klasse
- Sport: Handball
- Founded: 1957
- Organising body: Royal Belgian Handball Federation
- No. of teams: 12
- Country: Belgium
- Confederation: EHF
- Most recent champion: Sporting Pelt (2025-26)
- Most titles: Initia Hasselt (13 titles)
- Level on pyramid: 1
- Relegation to: Division 2
- International cups: Champions League; Cup Winners' Cup; EHF Cup

The Belgian Eerste Klasse (Dutch) or Division 1 (French) is the name of the professional handball league of Belgium.

== Competition format ==
The season begins with a tournament between the six teams who don't participate at the BeNe League. The first two teams join the teams from the BeNe League and they are separated in two play-off groups while the four others teams from the opening tournament participate to the play-down.

== 2016/17 Season participants ==
The following 12 clubs compete in the Eerste Klasse during the 2016–17 season.

Team	City	Arena	Notes
Hubo Initia HC Hasselt	Hasselt	Sporthal Alverberg	Club playing in BeNe League
Callant Tongeren	Tongeren	Eburons Dôme Tongeren	Club playing in BeNe League
Sezoens Achilles Bocholt	Bocholt	Sportcomplex De Damburg	Club playing in BeNe League
HC Visé BM	Visé	Visé Omnisports Hall	Club playing in BeNe League
Sporting Neerpelt-Lommel	Neerpelt-Lommel	Sportcentrum Dommelhof	Club playing in BeNe League
KV Sasja HC	Antwerp	Sportcomplex Sorghvliedt	Club playing in BeNe League
Olse Merksem HC	Antwerp	Sportcentrum De Rode Loop	
EHC Tournai	Tournai	C.E.T Sports Hall	
HC Eynatten-Raeren	Raeren	Sporthalle Eynatten	
Kreasa HB Houthalen	Houthalen-Helchteren	Sporthal Lakerveld	
VOO RHC Grâce-Hollogne	Grâce-Hollogne	Grâce-Hollogne Omnisports Hall	
HC Visé BM II	Visé	Visé Omnisports Hall	

== Eerste Klasse Champions ==
- 1958 : Olympic Club Flémallois
- 1959 : Olympic Club Flémallois (2)
- 1960 : Olympic Club Flémallois (3)
- 1961 : Olympic Club Flémallois (4)
- 1962 : Olympic Club Flémallois (5)
- 1963 : Olympic Club Flémallois (6)
- 1964 : Olympic Club Flémallois (7)
- 1965 : ROC Flémalle (8)
- 1966 : CH Schaerbeek Brussels
- 1967 : Progrès HC Seraing
- 1968 : KV Sasja HC
- 1969 : ROC Flémalle (9)
- 1970 : ROC Flémalle (10)
- 1971 : HC Inter Herstal
- 1972 : SK Avanti Lebbeke
- 1973 : SK Avanti Lebbeke (2)
- 1974 : KV Sasja HC (2)
- 1975 : KV Sasja HC (3)
- 1976 : ROC Flémalle (11)
- 1977 : Progrès HC Seraing (2)
- 1978 : Sporting Neerpelt
- 1979 : Yellow Red KV Mechelen
- 1980 : Sporting Neerpelt (2)
- 1981 : Sporting Neerpelt (3)
- 1982 : Sporting Neerpelt (4)
- 1983 : Sporting Neerpelt (5)
- 1984 : Initia HC Hasselt
- 1985 : Initia HC Hasselt (2)
- 1986 : Initia HC Hasselt (3)
- 1987 : Sporting Neerpelt (6)
- 1988 : Sporting Neerpelt (7)
- 1989 : Sporting Neerpelt (8)
- 1990 : Sporting Neerpelt (9)
- 1991 : Handball Club Herstal
- 1992 : Olse Merksem HC
- 1993 : Initia HC Hasselt (4)
- 1994 : Initia HC Hasselt (5)
- 1995 : Initia HC Hasselt (6)
- 1996 : Initia HC Hasselt (7)
- 1997 : Initia HC Hasselt (8)
- 1998 : Initia HC Hasselt (9)
- 1999 : Initia HC Hasselt (10)
- 2000 : Handball Club Eynatten
- 2001 : Handball Club Eynatten (2)
- 2002 : Handball Club Eynatten (3)
- 2003 : HC Elckerlyc Tongeren
- 2004 : Sporting Neerpelt (10)
- 2005 : HC Elckerlyc Tongeren (2)
- 2006 : KV Sasja HC (4)
- 2007 : KV Sasja HC (5)
- 2008 : KV Sasja HC (6)
- 2009 : United HC Tongeren (3)
- 2010 : United HC Tongeren (4)
- 2011 : Initia HC Hasselt (11)
- 2012 : United HC Tongeren (5)
- 2013 : Initia HC Hasselt (12)
- 2014 : Initia HC Hasselt (13)
- 2015 : United HC Tongeren (6)
- 2016 : HC Achilles Bocholt
- 2017 : HC Achilles Bocholt (2)
- 2018 : HC Achilles Bocholt (3)
- 2019 : HC Achilles Bocholt (4)
- 2022 : HC Visé BM
- 2023 : HC Achilles Bocholt (5)
- 2024 : Sporting Pelt (11)
- 2025 : HC Visé BM (2)
- 2026 : Sporting Pelt (12)

	Club	Titles	Year
1.	Initia HC Hasselt	13	1984, 1985, 1986, 1993, 1994, 1995, 1996, 1997, 1998, 1999, 2011, 2013, 2014
2.	Sporting Pelt	12	1978, 1980, 1981, 1982, 1983, 1987, 1988, 1989, 1990, 2004, 2024, 2026
3.	ROC Flémalle	11	1958, 1959, 1960, 1961, 1962, 1963, 1964, 1965, 1969, 1970, 1976
4.	KV Sasja HC	6	1968, 1974, 1975, 2006, 2007, 2008
	Callant Tongeren	6	2003, 2005, 2009, 2010, 2012, 2015
6.	HC Achilles Bocholt	5	2016, 2017, 2018, 2019, 2023
7.	HC Eynatten-Raeren	3	2000, 2001, 2002
8.	SK Avanti Lebbeke	2	1972, 1973
	Progrès HC Seraing	2	1967, 1977
	HC Visé BM	2	2022, 2025
12.	CH Schaerbeek Brussels	1	1966
	Handball Club Inter Herstal	1	1971
	Yellow Red KV Mechelen	1	1979
	Handball Club Herstal	1	1991
	Olse Merksem HC	1	1992

== EHF coefficient ranking ==
For season 2017/2018, see footnote

- 19. (27) (Czech Republic) Extraliga (14.67)
- 20. (19) (Slovakia) Extraliga (11.67)
- 21. (24) (Belgium) Eerste Klasse (11.25)
- 21. (22) (Finland) SM-liiga (11.25)
- 23. (32) (Netherlands) Lotto Eredivisie (10.78)
