= 2011–12 EHF Cup =

Tournament details
- Dates: 3 September 2011-24 May 2012
- Teams: 52

Final positions
- Champions: (Germany) Frisch Auf Göppingen
- Runners-up: (France) Dunkerque HB

Tournament statistics
- Top scorer: (France) Baptiste Butto (57)

The 2011–12 EHF Cup was the 31st edition of the EHF Cup. Frisch Auf Göppingen, who were the defending champions, and won the title for the second consecutive season, beating Dunkerque HB in the final.

== Knockout stage ==
=== Round 1 ===
Team 1	Agg.	Team 2	1st leg	2nd leg
HB Dudelange (Luxembourg)	59–65	(Belgium) Initia Hasselt	30–38	29–27
HC Olimpus-85-USEFS (Moldova)	44–73	(Netherlands) OCI-Lions	20–37	24–36
Latsia Kentriki Asfalistiki (Cyprus)	42–67	(Faroe Islands) Neistin	17–30	25–37
KH Kastrioti (Kosovo)	52–65	(Montenegro) RK Sutjeska Nikšić	25–35	27–30

=== Round 2 ===
Team 1	Agg.	Team 2	1st leg	2nd leg
SKIF Krasnodar (Russia)	62–48	(Cyprus) ASS Spes	37–17	25–31
Eskilstuna Guif (Sweden)	72–63	(Belarus) SKA Minsk	39–30	33–33
Neistin (Faroe Islands)	37–65	(Portugal) Madeira SAD	20–34	17–31
HC Dinamo Poltava (Ukraine)	60–44	(Turkey) Izmir BSB SK	29–22	31–22
Margareten Fivers (Austria)	62–65	(Romania) HC Odorheiu Secuiesc	32–28	30–37
AEK Athens (Greece)	49–53	(Netherlands) OCI-Lions	25–27	24–26
KRAS/Volendam (Netherlands)	42–57	(France) HBC Nantes	21–31	21–26
Põlva Serviti (Estonia)	42–49	(Austria) Bregenz Handball	23–26	19–23
Nordsjælland Håndbold (Denmark)	58–49	(Czech Republic) HC Dukla Praha	31–24	27–25
Balatonfüredi KSE (Hungary)	56–46	(Luxembourg) HC Berchem	25–23	31–23
Cuatro Rayas Valladolid (Spain)	63–53	(Norway) Elverum Håndball	38–29	25–24
Initia Hasselt (Belgium)	56–56	(Iceland) Fimleikafélag Hafnarfjarðar	28–29	28–27
RK Crvena zvezda (Serbia)	46–45	(Montenegro) RK Mojkovac	23–21	23–24
RK Vardar (North Macedonia)	53–54	(Bosnia and Herzegovina) RK Izviđač	27–25	26–29
RK Sutjeska Nikšić (Montenegro)	46–59	(Croatia) RK Nexe Našice	21–29	25–30
PAOK HC (Greece)	48–56	(Hungary) Tatabánya Carbonex KC	23–27	25–29

=== Round 3 ===
Team 1	Agg.	Team 2	1st leg	2nd leg
Nordsjælland Håndbold (Denmark)	57–56	(Russia) Sungul Snezhinsk	37–33	20–23
HBC Nantes (France)	65–66	(Belarus) Dinamo Minsk	28–32	37–34
Madeira SAD (Portugal)	43–51	(Slovakia) Tatran Prešov	24–24	19–27
Pfadi Winterthur (Switzerland)	52–53	(Sweden) Eskilstuna Guif	35–27	17–26
Skjern Håndbold (Denmark)	54–47	(Ukraine) HC Dinamo Poltava	33–21	21–26
RK Crvena zvezda (Serbia)	49–56	(Portugal) FC Porto Vitalis	28–25	21–31
SKIF Krasnodar (Russia)	56–58	(Israel) Maccabi Srugo Rishon Lezion	27–23	29–35
RK Nexe Našice (Croatia)	60–48	(Turkey) Besiktas JK	31–19	29–29
Dunkerque Handball Grand Littoral (France)	56–48	(Hungary) Balatonfüredi KSE	30–21	26–27
Tatabánya Carbonex KC (Hungary)	51–62	(Germany) Frisch Auf Göppingen	26–28	25–34
Bregenz Handball (Austria)	51–60	(Spain) Fraikin BM. Granollers	26–27	25–33
HC Odorheiu Secuiesc (Romania)	72–61	(Norway) Haslum HK	39–28	33–33
SC Magdeburg (Germany)	76–51	(Bosnia and Herzegovina) RK Izviđač	48–24	28–27
Fimleikafélag Hafnarfjarðar (Iceland)	46–64	(France) Saint-Raphaël Var Handball	20–29	26–35
Rhein-Neckar Löwen (Germany)	80–57	(Netherlands) OCI-Lions	42–30	38–27
RK Gorenje Velenje (Slovenia)	60–58	(Spain) Cuatro Rayas Valladolid	33–23	27–35

=== Round 4 ===
Team 1	Agg.	Team 2	1st leg	2nd leg
FC Porto Vitalis (Portugal)	52–55	(France) Saint-Raphaël Var Handball	28–26	24–29
Dinamo Minsk (Belarus)	60–54	(Spain) Fraikin BM. Granollers	35–27	25–27
Tatran Prešov (Slovakia)	59–43	(Denmark) Nordsjælland Håndbold	30–20	29–23
Eskilstuna Guif (Sweden)	70–74	(Germany) Rhein-Neckar Löwen	34–35	36–39
Skjern Håndbold (Denmark)	46–48	(France) Dunkerque Handball Grand Littoral	28–24	18–24
SC Magdeburg (Germany)	54–53	(Croatia) RK Nexe Našice	33–31	21–22
RK Gorenje Velenje (Slovenia)	72–54	(Israel) Maccabi Srugo Rishon Lezion	40–24	32–30
Frisch Auf Göppingen (Germany)	58–50	(Romania) HC Odorheiu Secuiesc	31–20	27–30

=== Quarterfinals ===
Team 1	Agg.	Team 2	1st leg	2nd leg
Dinamo Minsk (Belarus)	54–57	(Germany) Frisch Auf Göppingen	27–23	27–34
RK Gorenje Velenje (Slovenia)	54–57	(Germany) Rhein-Neckar Löwen	25–27	29–30
Tatran Prešov (Slovakia)	51–55	(Germany) SC Magdeburg	29–29	22–26
Saint-Raphaël Var Handball (France)	60–64	(France) Dunkerque Handball Grand Littoral	23–31	37–33

=== Semifinals ===
Team 1	Agg.	Team 2	1st leg	2nd leg
Rhein-Neckar Löwen (Germany)	62–65	(Germany) Frisch Auf Göppingen	33–32	29–33
SC Magdeburg (Germany)	47–48	(France) Dunkerque Handball Grand Littoral	25–30	22–18

=== Finals ===
Team 1	Agg.	Team 2	1st leg	2nd leg
Dunkerque Handball Grand Littoral (France)	54–60	(Germany) Frisch Auf Göppingen	26–26	28–34
