= Bocholt =

Bocholt may refer to:

- Bocholt, Germany, a city in the state of North Rhine-Westphalia
- Bocholt, Belgium, a municipality in the province of Limburg
