= Pim Rietbroek =

Dutch handball player (born 1942)

Personal information
- Nationality: Dutch
- Born: 2 April 1942 (age 84) Geleen, Netherlands
- Height: 1.80 m (5 ft 11 in)

Sport
- Sport: Handball

Senior clubs
- Years: Team
- –: Sittardia
- –: Vlug en Lenig
National team
Years	Team	Apps
1981–2001	Netherlands	1

Teams managed
- 1970–1974: Vlug en Lenig
- 1976–1985: Vlug en Lenig
- 1986–1988: Herstal
- 1988–1989: Sasja
- 1989–1994: Vlug en Lenig
- 1995–1997: Vlug en Lenig
- 1999–2003: Eynatten
- 2003–2005: Vlug en Lenig
- 2005–2007: Netherlands
- 2007–2011: BTB Aken
- 2011–2012: Eynatten
- 2012–2014: Achilles Bocholt

Pim Rietbroek (born 2 April 1942) is a Dutch retired handball player. As a player, he collected one cap for the Netherlands men's national handball team. After his playing career, he was active as a coach at various clubs and was national coach of the Dutch men's team.

== Career ==
As a player, he played mostly for Vlug en Lenig in the 1970s.

In 1997 he became player and coach of Vlug en Lenig, coaching it until 1975. He returned in 1976 and coached it until 1985, when he decided to take a respite from coaching. In this period he won three national titles and one Dutch cup with Vlug en Lenig. In 1999 Rietbroek became coach of Eynatten. During his time with the Belgian club he won the national title in 2000, 2001 and 2002 and the cup in 2000. In 2003 he left Eynatten to become again coach of V&L, coaching it until 2005. He then became coach of the Netherlands men's national handball team together with Harry Weerman. He coached the national team until 2007 because due to financial reasons at the NHV, he could no longer continue as national coach.
