= Belgian First Division (women's handball) =

The Handbal Eerste Klasse Nationale Vrouwen is the premier category of the Belgian women's handball national league. Established in 1964, it is currently contested by ten teams. The champion is currently granted a spot in the EHF Cup.

Fémina Visé and Initia Hasselt are the championship's most successful clubs with thirteen and twelve titles respectively as of 2025. Initia won ten titles in a row between 1986 and 1996 - and two more in 2015 and 2016 - while Fémina has been the competition's leading team since 1997.

== List of champions ==
- 1964 (Antwerp Province) Uilenspiegel Antwerpen
- 1965 (East Flanders) EV Aalst
- 1966 (East Flanders) EV Aalst (2)
- 1967 (East Flanders) Aalst Sportief
- 1968 (East Flanders) Aalst Sportief (2)
- 1969 not held
- 1970 not held
- 1971 not held
- 1972 (Antwerp Province) Uilenspiegel Antwerpen (2)
- 1973 (Limburg (Belgium)) United Tongeren
- 1974 (East Flanders) Avanti Lebbeke
- 1975 (East Flanders) Aalst Sportief (3)
- 1976 (East Flanders) Avanti Lebbeke (2)
- 1977 (East Flanders) Avanti Lebbeke (3)
- 1978 (Antwerp Province) Uilenspiegel Antwerpen (3)
- 1979 (Antwerp Province) Uilenspiegel Antwerpen (4)
- 1980 (Limburg (Belgium)) United Tongeren (2)
- 1981 (Antwerp Province) Uilenspiegel Wilrijk
- 1982 (Limburg (Belgium)) United Tongeren (3)
- 1983 (East Flanders) Avanti Lebbeke (4)
- 1984 (East Flanders) Avanti Lebbeke (5)
- 1985 (Antwerp Province) Sasja Hoboken
- 1986 (Limburg (Belgium)) United Tongeren (4)
- 1987 (Limburg (Belgium)) Initia Hasselt
- 1988 (Limburg (Belgium)) Initia Hasselt (2)
- 1989 (Limburg (Belgium)) Initia Hasselt (3)
- 1990 (Limburg (Belgium)) Initia Hasselt (4)
- 1991 (Limburg (Belgium)) Initia Hasselt (5)
- 1992 (Limburg (Belgium)) Initia Hasselt (6)
- 1993 (Limburg (Belgium)) Initia Hasselt (7)
- 1994 (Limburg (Belgium)) Initia Hasselt (8)
- 1995 (Limburg (Belgium)) Initia Hasselt (9)
- 1996 (Limburg (Belgium)) Initia Hasselt (10)
- 1997 (Liège Province) Fémina Visé
- 1998 (Liège Province) Fémina Visé (2)
- 1999 (Liège Province) Fémina Visé (3)
- 2000 (Liège Province) Fémina Visé (4)
- 2001 (Liège Province) Fémina Visé (5)
- 2002 (Limburg (Belgium)) DHC Meeuwen
- 2003 (Limburg (Belgium)) DHC Meeuwen (2)
- 2004 (Liège Province) Fémina Visé (6)
- 2005 (Antwerp Province) DHW Antwerpen (5)
- 2006 (Limburg (Belgium)) Juventus Melveren
- 2007 (Liège Province) Fémina Visé (7)
- 2008 (Liège Province) Fémina Visé (8)
- 2009 (Liège Province) Fémina Visé (9)
- 2010 (Liège Province) Fémina Visé (10)
- 2011 (Antwerp Province) DHW Antwerpen (6)
- 2012 (Liège Province) Fémina Visé (11)
- 2013 (Antwerp Province) DHW Antwerpen (7)
- 2014 (Liège Province) Fémina Visé (12)
- 2015 (Limburg (Belgium)) Initia Hasselt (11)
- 2016 (Limburg (Belgium)) Initia Hasselt (12)
- 2017 (Limburg (Belgium)) HB Sint-Truiden
- 2018 (Limburg (Belgium)) HB Sint-Truiden (2)
- 2019 (Limburg (Belgium)) Achilles Bocholt
- 2020 No Champion
- 2021 No Champion
- 2022 (Liège Province) Fémina Visé (11)
- 2023 (Limburg (Belgium)) HB Sint-Truiden (4)
- 2024 (Limburg (Belgium)) HB Sint-Truiden (5)
- 2025 (Limburg (Belgium)) HB Sint-Truiden (6)
- 2025 (Limburg (Belgium)) Hubo Handbal (1)

== 2011-12 teams ==
- (Antwerp Province) DHW Antwerpen
- (Limburg (Belgium)) Achilles Bocholt
- (Liège Province) HC Eynatten-Raeren
- (Liège Province) Fémina Visé
- (Limburg (Belgium)) Initia Hasselt
- (Limburg (Belgium)) DHC Meeuwen
- (West Flanders) DHT Middelkerke-Izegem
- (Antwerp Province) Rhino Turnhout
- (Limburg (Belgium)) HB Sint-Truiden
- (East Flanders) DHC Waasmunster
