= Eredivisie (men's handball) =

- Current season, competition or edition: 2025–26 Eredivisie (men's handball)
- Sport: Handball
- Founded: 1954
- No. of teams: 16 (+6)
- Country: Netherlands
- Confederation: EHF
- Most recent champion: Beekse Fusie Club (2023-24)
- Most titles: Sittardia (18 titles)
- Relegation to: Eerste divisie
- International cups: European League; European Cup
- Website: Official website

The Nederlandse Handbal Eredivisie is the top Dutch professional handball league. The winners of the Eredivisie are recognised as the Dutch handball champions.

== Competition format ==
In the first phase of the season, the top 6 teams of the previous season participate in the BENE-League competition. They are joined by the top 6 teams from Belgium. At the same time, the remaining 12 teams, participate in a national competition. In the second phase, the 4 best ranking Dutch teams of the BENE-League, who automatically qualified for next season's BENE-League, compete in a 2-round system for the national title. The first round is a full competition among those 4. In the second round the 2 teams which ended on top, decide in a best-of-three who wins the title. In the final ranking, these teams end up on ranks 1 to 4. The 2 lowest ranking Dutch teams of the BENE-League, together with the 2 best ranking teams of the national competition, compete in full competition, for 2 spots in next season's BENE-League. In the final ranking, these teams end up on ranks 5 to 8. The teams which ended 3 to 10 in the national competition play a 3-round system to decide their final ranking (ranks 9 to 16). Something like a knock-out system with the major difference that losing a match doesn't mean you get eliminated but you continue for the lower ranks, where winning means you continue for the better ranks. So the teams winning in the first round continue for the final ranks 9 to 12 and those losing for the ranks 13 to 16. The same principle is repeated in the second round and final ranks are decided in the third round. Last but not least, the 2 teams who ended at the bottom of the national competition, together with 4-period winners of the Eerste Divisie compete in a 2-round system for 1 spot in next season's Eredivisie. In the first round, the 6 teams are split into 2 groups of 3 in such a way that the 2 Eredivisie teams are never in the same group. In each group, the 3 teams play a full competition. The winners of both groups decide in a best-of-two who plays next season in the Eredivisie. The final spot in the Eredivisie is taken by the champions of the Eerste Divisie.

== 2020–21 season ==
The following 16 clubs compete in the Eredivisie during the 2020–21 season.

Team	City	Arena	Notes
Green Park/Aalsmeer	Aalsmeer	Sporthal De Bloemhof	Club playing in BENE-League
Herpertz Bevo HC	Panningen	SportArena De Heuf	Club playing in BENE-League
JD Techniek/Hurry-Up	Zwartemeer	Succes Holidayparcs Arena	Club playing in BENE-League
Quintus	Kwintsheul	Eekhout Hal	Club playing in BENE-League
KEMBIT-LIONS	Sittard-Geleen	Stadssporthal Sittard	Club playing in BENE-League
KRAS/Volendam	Volendam	Sporthal de Opperdam	Club playing in BENE-League
Green Park/Aalsmeer II	Aalsmeer	Sporthal De Bloemhof	
Herpertz Bevo HC II	Panningen	SportArena De Heuf	
BFC	Beek	Sportlandgoed De Haamen	
DFS Arnhem	Arnhem	Rijkerswoerd	
Dynamico	Oss	Sporthal Rusheuvel	
Oosting/E&O	Emmen	Sporthal Angelslo	
EHC	Leidschendam-Voorburg	European Sports Dome	
Feyenoord	Rotterdam	Wielewaal	
GHV	Goirle	Sporthal De Wissel	
Havas	Almere	Sporthal Stedenwijk	
IMTO Benelux/Hellas	The Hague	Hellashal	
The Dome/Handbal Houten	Houten	Sportcentrum The Dome	
V&L-Sittardia Combibatie	Sittard-Geleen	LACO Glanerbrook	
RED-RAG/Tachos	Waalwijk	Topsporthal De Slagen	
KRAS/Volendam II	Volendam	Sporthal De Opperdam	
WHC-Herclues	The Hague	Loosduinen	

== Eredivisie previous champions ==
- 1954 : Aalsmeer
- 1955 : PSV Handbal
- 1956 : Olympia Hengelo
- 1957 : Olympia Hengelo (2)
- 1958 : Olympia Hengelo (3)
- 1959: Aalsmeer (2)
- 1960 : NILOC Amsterdam
- 1961 : NILOC Amsterdam (2)
- 1962 : Operatie '55
- 1963 : Operatie '55 (2)
- 1964 : Operatie '55 (3)
- 1965 : Operatie '55 (4)
- 1966 : Sittardia
- 1967 : ESCA Arnhem
- 1968 : Sittardia (2)
- 1969 : Sittardia (3)
- 1970 : Sittardia (4)
- 1971 : Sittardia (5)
- 1972 : Sittardia (6)
- 1973 : Sittardia (7)
- 1974 : Sittardia (8)
- 1975 : Sittardia (9)
- 1976 : Sittardia (10)
- 1977 : Sittardia (11)
- 1978 : Duyvestein/Hermes
- 1979 : Sittardia (12)
- 1980 : NCR/Blauw-Wit
- 1981 : NCR/Blauw-Wit (2)
- 1982 : Vlug en Lenig
- 1983 : Vlug en Lenig (2)
- 1984 : Vlug en Lenig (3)
- 1985 : Aalsmeer (3)
- 1986 : Herschi/V&L (4)
- 1987 : Sittardia (13)
- 1988 : Kwantum/Blauw-Wit (3)
- 1989 : HAKA/E&O
- 1990 : VGZ/Sittardia (14)
- 1991 : HAKA/E&O (2)
- 1992 : HAKA/E&O (3)
- 1993 : VGZ/Sittardia (15)
- 1994 : VGZ/Sittardia (16)
- 1995 : Thrifty/Aalsmeer (4)
- 1996 : ANOVA/E&O (4)
- 1997 : Horn/Sittardia (17)
- 1998 : ANOVA/E&O (5)
- 1999 : Horn/Sittardia (18)
- 2000 : ShowBizCity/Aalsmeer (5)
- 2001 : ShowBizCity/Aalsmeer (6)
- 2002 : Wealer/V&L (5)
- 2003 : FIQAS/Aalsmeer (7)
- 2004 : FIQAS/Aalsmeer (8)
- 2005 : KRAS/Volendam
- 2006 : KRAS/Volendam (2)
- 2007 : KRAS/Volendam (3)
- 2008 : Hellas Den Haag
- 2009 : FIQAS/Aalsmeer (9)
- 2010 : KRAS/Volendam (4)
- 2011 : KRAS/Volendam (5)
- 2012 : KRAS/Volendam (6)
- 2013 : KRAS/Volendam (7)
- 2014 : Eurotech/Bevo HC
- 2015 : OCI-LIONS
- 2016 : OCI-LIONS (2)
- 2017 : OCI-LIONS (3)
- 2018 : FIQAS/Aalsmeer (10)
- 2019 : Green Park/Aalsmeer (11)
- 2020 : No champion
- 2021: Green Park/Aalsmeer (12)
- 2022: Green Park/Aalsmeer (13)
- 2023 : KEMBIT-LIONS (4)
- 2024 : Beekse Fusie Club

	Club	Titles	Year
1.	Sittardia	18	1966, 1968, 1969, 1970, 1971, 1972, 1973, 1974, 1975, 1976, 1977, 1979, 1987, 1990, 1993, 1994, 1997, 1999
2.	Aalsmeer	13	1954, 1959, 1985, 1995, 2000, 2001, 2003, 2004, 2009, 2018, 2019, 2021, 2022
3.	Volendam	7	2005, 2006, 2007, 2010, 2011, 2012, 2013
4.	E&O	5	1989, 1991, 1992, 1996, 1998
	Vlug en Lenig	5	1982, 1983, 1984, 1986, 2002
6.	Operatie '55	4	1962, 1963, 1964, 1965
	Limburg Lions	4	2015, 2016, 2017, 2023
7.	Olympia Hengelo	3	1956, 1957, 1958
	Blauw-Wit Neerbeek	3	1980, 1981, 1988
10.	NILOC Amsterdam	2	1960, 1961
11.	PSV Handbal	1	1955
	ESCA Arnhem	1	1967
	Hermes Den Haag	1	1978
	Hellas Den Haag	1	2008
	Bevo HC	1	2014
	Beekse Fusie Club	1	2024

== EHF coefficient ranking ==
For season 2017/2018, see footnote

- 24. (23) (Belgium) Eerste Nationele
- 25. (28) (Luxembourg) Sales Lentz League
- 26. (32) (Netherlands) Eredivisie
- 27. (26) (Czech Republic) Extraliga
- 28. (22) (Greece) Handball Premier
