= Lambers =

Lambers is a surname. Notable people with the surname include:

- Jeroen Lambers (born 1980), Dutch footballer
- Ineke Lambers-Hacquebard (1946–2014), Dutch politician
- Paul Ronald Lambers (1942–1970), American army soldier and Medal of Honor recipient

== See also ==
- Lambert (name)
