= Helden, Limburg =

Helden Helje
- Village
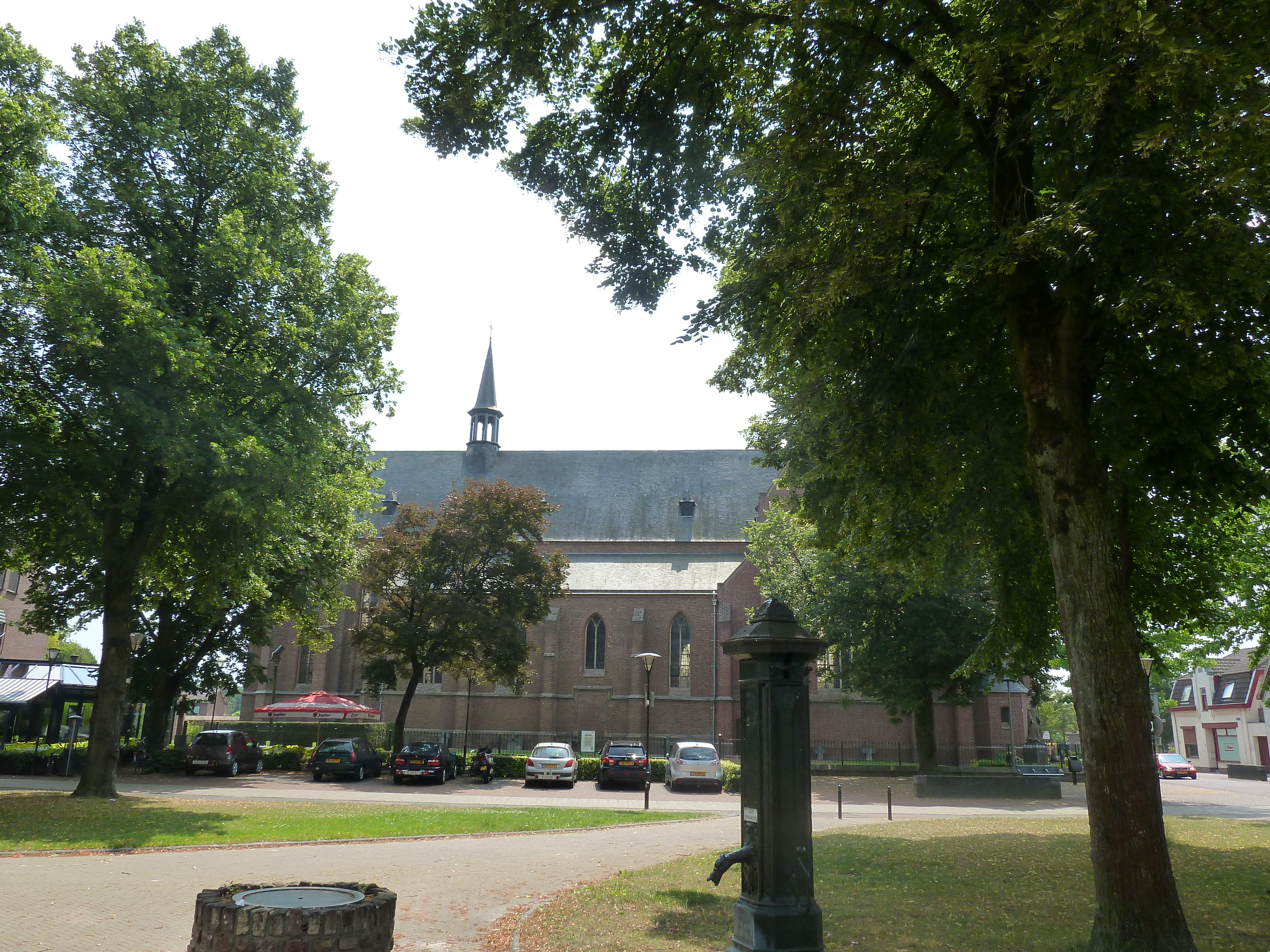
- St Lambertus Church and the village pump

- Flag Coat of arms

- Location in the Netherlands Location in the province of Limburg in the Netherlands
- Coordinates: 51°19′12″N 5°59′59″E
- Country: Netherlands
- Province: Limburg
- Municipality: Peel en Maas

Area
  - Total: 6.90 km^{2} (2.66 sq mi)
- Elevation: 33 m (108 ft)

Population (2021)
  - Total: 6,265
  - Density: 908/km^{2} (2,350/sq mi)
- Time zone: UTC+1 (CET)
  - Summer (DST): UTC+2 (CEST)
- Postal code: 5980-5981, 5984-5988
- Dialing code: 077

Helden (Dutch pronunciation: [ˈɦɛldə(n)]; Limburgish: Helje) is a village located in the province of Limburg in southeastern Netherlands. The village dates back to the tenth century at least, and a local variation of Limburgish is still spoken by some of the population.

Helden and twin city Panningen previously belonged to the Helden municipality, but in 2010 they joined other municipalities to form the new municipality of Peel en Maas.

== History ==
The village was first mentioned in 1144 as "apud Helden", and means "hill". Until 1279, it was part of the County of Kessel.

In 1674, it was sold to Gelderland as an independent heerlijkheid, which before 1800 was the lowest administrative and judicial unit in rural areas in these parts.

After the occupation by Gelderland, Helden was sold to Prussia. Under Prussia, Helden developed a small industry.

Only after the Napoleonic wars of 1814 did Helden belong to the Kingdom of the Netherlands. But not for long, as Belgium's Independence changed Helden with a large part of Limburg going to the state of Belgium.

The Catholic St Lambertus Church is a three-aisled basilica-like church. The nave and choir date from the 15th century. The church was restored after a fire in 1885. In 1944, the tower which probably dated from the 14th century was blown up. The church was restored from 1952 to 1953, and a more modest tower was added.

Helden was home to 341 people in 1840. It was an independent municipality, however the town hall was located in Panningen. In 2010, it was merged into Peel en Maas.
