= Tim Remer =

Dutch handball player (born 1985)

Personal information
- Nationality: Dutch
- Born: 29 July 1985 (age 41) Rotterdam, Netherlands
- Height: 1.96 m (6 ft 5 in)

Sport
- Sport: Handball
- Position: Left wing
- Current club: TuS Haren
- Number: 85

Youth career
- Years: Team
- 2000–2001: HVOS
- 2001–2002: SV Atomium ‘61
- 2002–2003: Van der Voort/Quintus

Senior clubs
- Years: Team
- 2003–2004: E&O Emmen
- 2004–2006: TV Emsdetten
- 2006–2018: TuS Nettelstedt-Lübbecke
- 2018–2022: HV Hurry-Up
National team
Years	Team	Apps	(Gls)
2003-2020	Netherlands	95	(228)

Teams managed
- 2020–2022: Navique/SVBO

Tim Remer (born 29 July 1985) is a Dutch retired handball player. He does however still play amateur handball at TuS Haren in the German lower divisions.

He represented the Netherlands at the 2020 European Men's Handball Championship.
