= Avanti Lebbeke =

Belgian handball club

Avanti Lebbeke was a Belgian handball club from Lebbeke. It was one of the leading Belgian clubs through the 1970s and the first half of the 1980s, winning twice the male championship and three times the national cup in addition to five female championships. Both teams took part in IHF international competitions.

== Titles ==
- Men
  - First Division
    - 1972, 1973
  - Belgian Cup
    - 1972, 1979, 1985
- Women
  - First Division
    - 1974, 1976, 1977, 1983, 1984
  - cup:
    - 1972
