= Samir Benghanem =

Dutch handball player (born 1993)

Personal information
- Nationality: Dutch
- Born: 10 December 1993 (age 32) The Hague, Netherlands
- Height: 1.95 m (6 ft 5 in)

Sport
- Sport: Handball
- Position: Pivot
- Current club: HV Aalsmeer
- Number: 13

Senior clubs
- Years: Team
- -2014: HV Hellas
- 2014-: HV Aalsmeer
National team
| Years | Team | Apps | (Gls) |
| 2013- | Netherlands | 62 | (117) |
- Updated on 8 January 2024

Samir Benghanem (born 10 December 1993) is a Dutch handball player for HV Aalsmeer and the Dutch national team.

He represented the Netherlands at the 2020, 2022 and 2024 European Championships.
