= Jeroen Lambers =

Dutch footballer

Personal information
- Date of birth: October 20, 1980 (age 46)
- Place of birth: Zwartemeer, Netherlands
- Height: 1.90 m (6 ft 3 in)
- Position: Goalkeeper

Senior career*
Years	Team	Apps	(Gls)
2003–2006	Groningen	8	(0)
2006–2007	Falkirk	9	(0)
2007–2010	Veendam	14	(0)
2010–2013	WKE		
- * Club domestic league appearances and goals

Jeroen Lambers (born 20 October 1980) is a Dutch former professional footballer who played as a goalkeeper.

== Career ==
Lambers began playing football with Groningen after being scouted as a 17-year-old at his local club VV Zwartermeer. After seven years as a reserve goalkeeper in Groningen, Lambers had a successful trial with Falkirk and signed for the Scottish Premier League club in 2006.

Lambers returned to the Netherlands in 2007 after losing his starting spot in Falkirk to Kasper Schmeichel. Instead, he signed with Veendam where he was mostly a backup to Barry Ditewig. After playing some years in the lower leagues for WKE and VV Zwartemeer, he retired from football 2016 due to a bacterial infection in his knee.
