= HC Visé BM =

Belgian handball club

- Full name: Handball Club Visé Basse-Meuse
- Nickname: Les Mosans
- Short name: HC Visé
- Founded: 1954; 72 years ago
- Arena: Hall omnisports de Visé, Visé
- Capacity: 600
- President: Arthur Hoge
- Head coach: Thomas Cauwenberghs
- League: Belgian First Division, BENE-League
- Club colours
Home	Away

HC Visé BM is a men's handball club from Visé, Belgium, that plays in the Belgian First Division and in the BENE-League.

Location of HC Visé BM

== History ==
The association was founded in 1954 under the name Amicale Visé. In 1988, the name of the club was changed to Handball Club Visé Basse-Meuse. The team reached the Belgian First Division in the 2000/2001 season. In 2014, they reached the final of the Belgian Cup, where they lost against Initia HC Hasselt 32-27, but since Initia HC Hasselt managed to win the league title, the club was able to participate in the international cup for the first time in the 2014/15 season, the EHF Challenge Cup. In 2019, the team took second place in the BENE-League. In 2021/22, the club won the national championship for the first time.

== Crest, colours, supporters ==
=== Naming history ===
Name	Period
Amicale Visé	1954–1988
HC Visé BM	1988–present

=== Kits ===
HOME

2018–19

AWAY
2018–19	2019–23

== Team ==
=== Current squad ===
Squad for the 2023–24 season

HC Visé BM

Goalkeepers

- 1 (Romania) Claudiu Rotarescu
- 16 (Belgium) Nicholas Plessers
- 21 (Belgium) Corentin Delatte
- 81 (Belgium) Romain Delbouille

Left Wingers

- 7 (Belgium) Julien Devisch
- 19 (Belgium) Jules Kieffer-Heuls
- 41 (Belgium) Julien Seleck

Right Wingers

- 4 (Belgium) Pierre Brixhe
- 5 (Belgium) Pierre-Loup Maes

Line Players

- 11 (Belgium) Romain Destexhe
- 22 (Belgium) Yves Vancosen (c)
- 65 (Belgium) Sacha Visentin

Left Backs

- 18 (France) Camille N'Guema-Mantion
- 47 (Belgium) Charles Moonen
- 99 (Belgium) (Bosnia and Herzegovina) Hamza Hadžić

Central Backs

- 9 (France) Jules Ranc
- 14 (Belgium) Martin Massat
- 17 (Netherlands) Florent Bourget
- 66 (Belgium) Adrien Amormino

Right Backs

- 23 (Belgium) Auguste Boyon
- 59 (France) (Senegal) Vincent Bello

=== Technical staff ===
- Head coach: (Belgium) Thomas Cauwenberghs

=== Transfers ===
Transfers for the 2026–27 season

Joining

Leaving

- (Belgium) Victor Regnier (CB) to (France) Handball Hazebrouck 71

=== Transfer History ===
Transfers for the 2023–24 season

Joining

- (Netherlands) Florent Bourget (CB) from (Greece) Olympiacos
- (Belgium) Julien Devisch (LW) from (Belgium) Initia HC Hasselt

Leaving

- (Belgium) Sébastien Danesi (LB) to (France) Grand Besançon DH

== Accomplishments ==
- Belgian First Division:
  - Winners (1) : 2022
  - Runner-Up (1) : 2019
- BENE-League:
  - Runner-Up (1) : 2019
- Belgian Handball Cup:
  - Runner-Up (3) : 2014, 2018, 2021

== EHF ranking ==
As of 26/10/2023

Rank	Team	Points
82	(Greece) Olympiacos	62
83	(Italy) SSV Brixen Handball	62
84	(Norway) Drammen HK	61
85	(Belgium) HC Visé BM	60
86	(Luxembourg) Handball Esch	59
87	(Kosovo) KH Besa Famgas	59
88	(Romania) AHC Potaissa Turda	58

== Former club members ==
=== Notable former players ===
- (Belgium) Christophe Bourlet (2013-2014)
- (Belgium) Pierre Brixhe (2014-)
- (Belgium) Sébastien Danesi (2018-2021, 2022-2023)
- (Belgium) Max Fortemps (1992-2004)
- (Belgium) Florian Glesner (2014-2019)
- (Belgium) (Poland) Bartosz Kedziora (2019-2022)
- (Netherlands) Florent Bourget (2023-)
- (Netherlands) Rudi Schenk (2019-2020)

=== Former coaches ===
Seasons	Coach	Country
2010–2014	Davor Peric	(Belgium)
2014–2018	Predrag Dosen	(Serbia)
2018–2022	Korneel Douven	(Belgium)
2022–	Thomas Cauwenberghs	(Belgium)
