= HV Aalsmeer =

Dutch handball club

- Full name: Handbalvereniging Aalsmeer
- Founded: July 9, 1930; 96 years ago
- Arena: Sporthal Bloemhof
- Capacity: 1450
- Head coach: Wai Wong
- League: NHV Eredivisie, BENE-League
- 2024-2025: 3rd
| Home | Away |

HV Aalsmeer, also known as HV Greenpark Tigers Aalsmeer due to sponsorship reasons, is a men's handball club from Aalsmeer, Netherlands, that plays in the NHV Eredivisie and BENE-League.

The men's team of HV Aalsmeer was able to the national championship 12 times. The most recent was in 2022.

== Titles ==
- BENE-League :
  - Winners (1) : 2009, 2017
- NHV Eredivisie :
  - Winners (12) : 1954, 1985, 1995, 2000, 2001, 2003, 2004, 2009, 2018, 2019, 2021, 2022
- Dutch Cup :
  - Winners (6) : 1987, 1989, 1998, 2000, 2004, 2008

== Team ==
=== Current squad ===
Squad for the 2018-2019 season

Goalkeepers

- (Romania) Gabriel Birjovanu
- (Netherlands) Marco Verbeij

Wingers
RW

- (Netherlands) Robin Boomhouwer
- (Netherlands) Micheal Kampsteeg

LW

- (Netherlands) Nils Dekker
- (Netherlands) Quinten Ouderland

Line players

- (Netherlands) Samir Benghanem

Back players
LB

- (Netherlands) Tim Bottinga
- (Netherlands) Remco Van Dam

CB

- (Netherlands) Erik Blaauw
- (Lithuania) Vaidas Trainavicius

RB

- (Netherlands) Jim Castien
- (Netherlands) Rob Jansen
- (Netherlands) Marwin Van Offeren
