= Hurry-Up (handball club) =

Dutch handball club

- Full name: JD Techniek/Hurry-Up
- Founded: June 24, 1954; 72 years ago
- Arena: Techniekplein Emmen Arena
- Capacity: 800
- Head coach: Joop Fiege
- League: Dutch Handball League
- 2024-2025: 12th
Home	Away

JD Techniek/Hurry-Up is a men's handball club from Zwartemeer, Netherlands, that plays in the NHV Eredivisie. They have won the Dutch championship twice in 2014-15 and 2015-16.

== Naming History ==
- 2006/07 Huizenplaats.nl/Hurry-Up
- 2007/08 - 2009/10 Mannak/Hurry-up
- 2010/11 - 2012/13 Kremer/Hurry-Up
- 2013/14 - 2017/18 JMS/Hurry-Up
- 2018/19 - 2021/22 JD Techniek/Hurry-Up
- 2022/23 - 2023/24 Drenth Groep/Hurry-Up
- 2024/25 - today JD Techniek/Hurry-Up

== Crest, colours, supporters ==
=== Kits ===
HOME
2017–18	2020–21

== Honours ==
- Dutch Cup 2010/2011
- EHF Challenge Cup semi-final 2016/2017

== European record ==
Season	Competition	Round	Club	1st leg	2nd leg	Aggregate
2016–17	Challenge Cup	R3	(Turkey) Göztepe S.K.	20–22	28–25	48–47
2016–17	Challenge Cup	1/8	(Slovakia) MSK Povazska Bystrica	19–30	32–19	51–49
2016–17	Challenge Cup	QF	(Slovakia) HKM Sala	28–24	38–32	66–56
2016–17	Challenge Cup	SF	(Portugal) Sporting CP	27–32	14–37	41–69

== Team ==
=== Current squad ===
Squad for the 2016–17 season

Goalkeepers

- (Denmark) Thomas Aagaard
- (Netherlands) Wouter Greevink
- (Netherlands) Sven Hemmes
- (Netherlands) Manuel Kremer

Wingers
RW

- (Germany) Tobias Marx
- (Netherlands) Bart Mik

LW

- (Netherlands) Thies Berendsen
- (Netherlands) Tommie Falke

Line players

- (Bosnia and Herzegovina) Almir Balas
- (Netherlands) Sjoerd Boonstra
- (Netherlands) Rick Hollander

Back players
LB

- (Lithuania) Tomas Bernatavicius
- (Netherlands) Ruben Fiege
- (Netherlands) Loek Hageman
- (Germany) Joel Heusmann
- (Netherlands) Aron Kieviet

CB

- (Lithuania) Vaidas Trainavicius

RB

- (Netherlands) Ronald Suelmann
- (Greece) Dimitrios Katsikis

=== Transfers ===
Transfers for the 2026–27 season

Joining

- (Czech Republic) Adam Řeháček (GK) from (Portugal) Póvoa AC

Leaving

- (Portugal) Gonçalo Moreira Grácio (LW) to (Portugal) ABC Braga
- (Netherlands) Emiel Hoogland (CB) to (Germany) HSG Nordhorn-Lingen

=== Transfer History ===
Transfers for the 2025–26 season

Joining

- (Germany) Fynn Lügering (LB) from (Germany) HSG Nordhorn-Lingen

Leaving

- (Netherlands) Jorick Pol (GK) to (Germany) TVB Stuttgart

== List of coaches ==
- –2010: NED Peter Janssen
- 2010–2012: NED Joop Fiege
- 2012–2013: NED Rob Fiege
- 2013: NED Lars Hoogeveen (a.i.)
- 2013–2014: NED Peter Janssen
- 2014–2016: NED Joop Fiege
- 2016–2018: NED Martin Vlijm
- 2018–2019: NED Manuël Kremer & NED Tim Remer
- 2019–2023: NED Joop Fiege
- 2023–heden: NED Sven Hemmes
