= KV Sasja HC Hoboken =

Belgian handball club

- Full name: Koninklijke Vereniging Sport Afdelingen Syndicale Jeugd Antwerpen Handbal Club Hoboken
- Founded: 1958
- Arena: Sportcomplex Sorghvliedt
- Capacity: 950
- President: Jan de Meyer
- Head coach: Alex Jacobs
- League: Belgian First Division, BeNe League
- 2015-16: 4th

KV Sasja HC Hoboken is a Belgian handball team from Hoboken, Antwerp. They compete in Belgian liga 1 and the BeNe League.

== Accomplishments ==
- BeNe League:
  - Winners (1) : 2008
- Belgian First Division:
  - Winners (6) : 1968, 1974, 1975, 2006, 2007, 2008
- Belgian Cup:
  - Winners (6) : 1971, 1973, 1977, 1981, 1982, 2007
  - Runner-Up (9) : 1967, 1975, 1980, 1984, 1987, 1988, 1995, 2011, 2017

== Team ==
=== Current squad ===
Squad for the 2016–17 season

Goalkeepers

- (Belgium) Sam Theyssens

Wingers
RW
LW
Line

- (Belgium) Nemanja Kostic

Back players
LB
CB

- (Belgium) Kevin Jacobs
- (Belgium) Hans Lamberigts
- (Belgium) Jasper Roelants
