= Bevo HC =

Dutch handball club

- Full name: Bevo Heldia Combinatie
- Founded: 1969
- Arena: De Heuf
- Capacity: 1000
- Head coach: Men: Bartosz Konitz; Women: Daniëlle Horsten
- League: Men: BENE-League; Woman: Tweede divisie B
- 2024-2025: 10th (men))
Home	Away

Bevo HC is a Dutch handball club from Panningen, Limburg. The club was founded on 1 July 1987 after the merger of BEVO and Heldia. The men's team competes in the BENE-League in the season 2019-2020. The woman's team competes in eredivisie in the season 2019-2020.

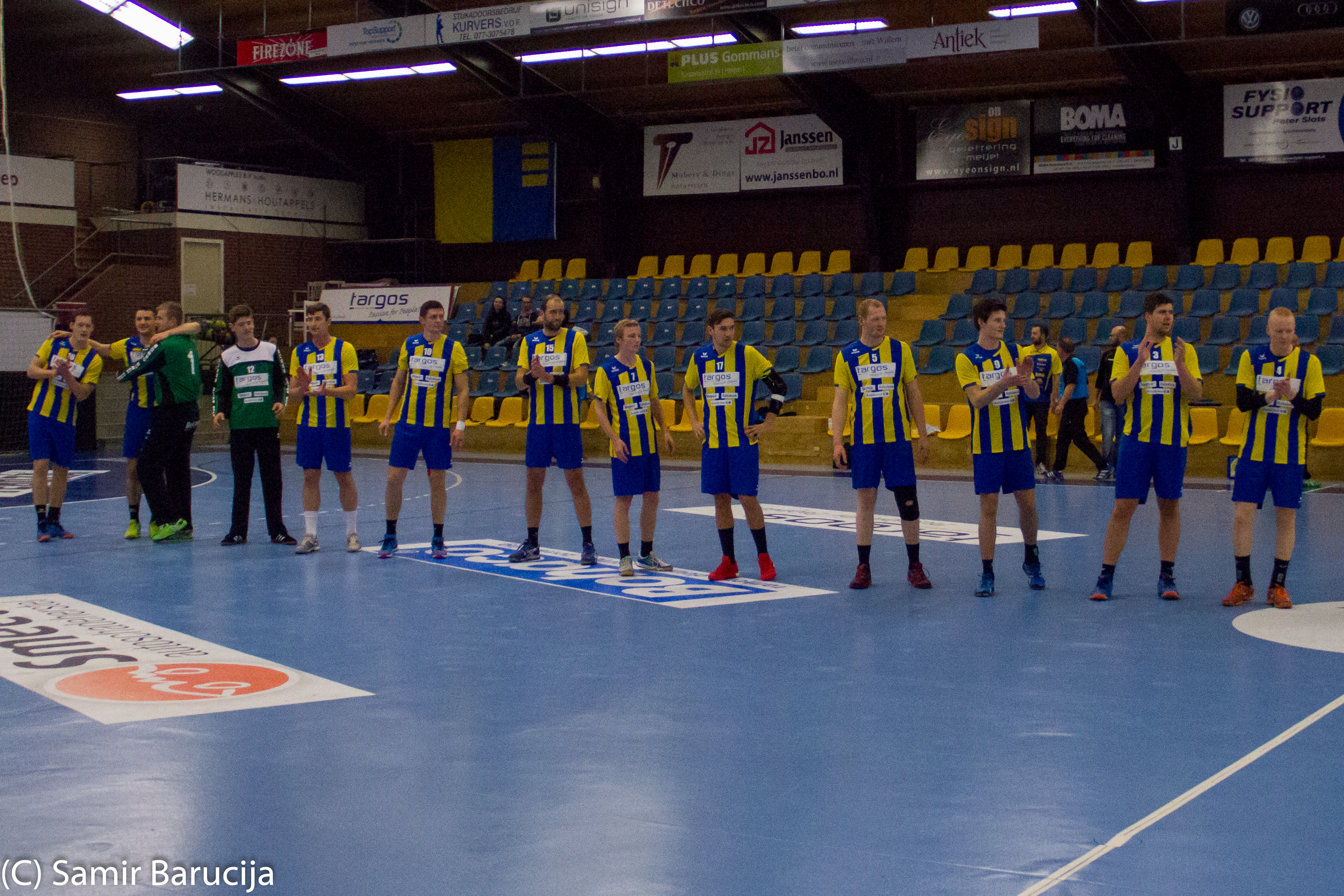
Men's team of Bevo HC in De Heuf in 2015

== Crest, colours, supporters ==
=== Kits ===
HOME
2015–18	2018–20

== Accomplishments ==
=== Men ===
- NHV Eredivisie:
  - Winners (1) : 2014
  - Runner-Up (3) : 2004, 2009, 2016
- Dutch Handball Cup:
  - Winners (1) : 2018
  - Runner-Up (5) : 2001, 2004, 2005, 2007, 2008
- Dutch Supercup:
  - Winners (3) : 2004, 2007, 2014
  - Runner-Up (1) : 2018
