= Limburg Lions =

Dutch handball team

- Full name: Limburg Lions
- Founded: June 30, 2008; 17 years ago
- Arena: Stadssporthal, Sittard
- Head coach: Christoph Jauernik
- League: Eredivisie; BENE-League
- Club colours
Home	Away

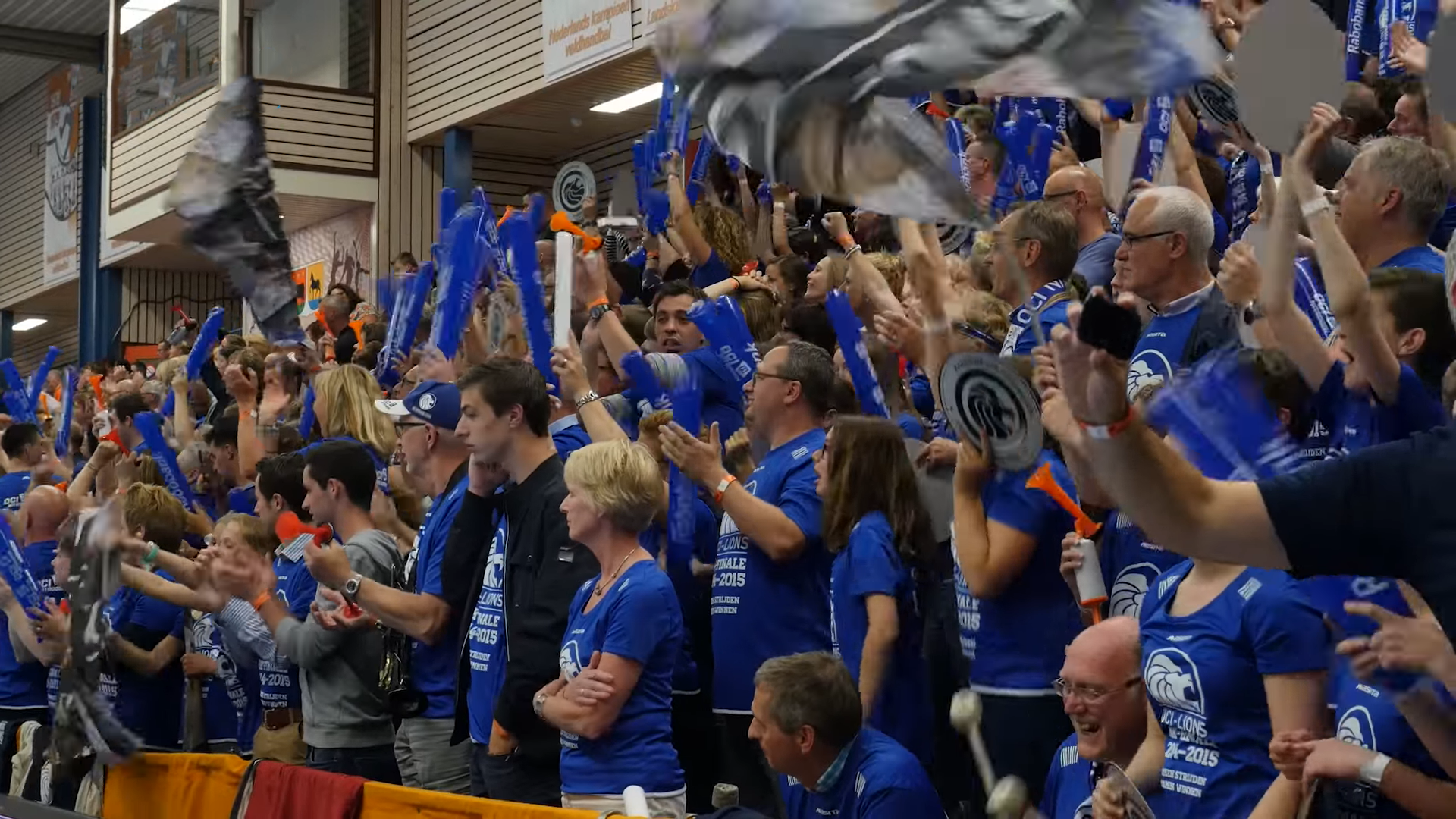
Limburg Lions' supporters during the Best-of-Three final 2015 against Volendam

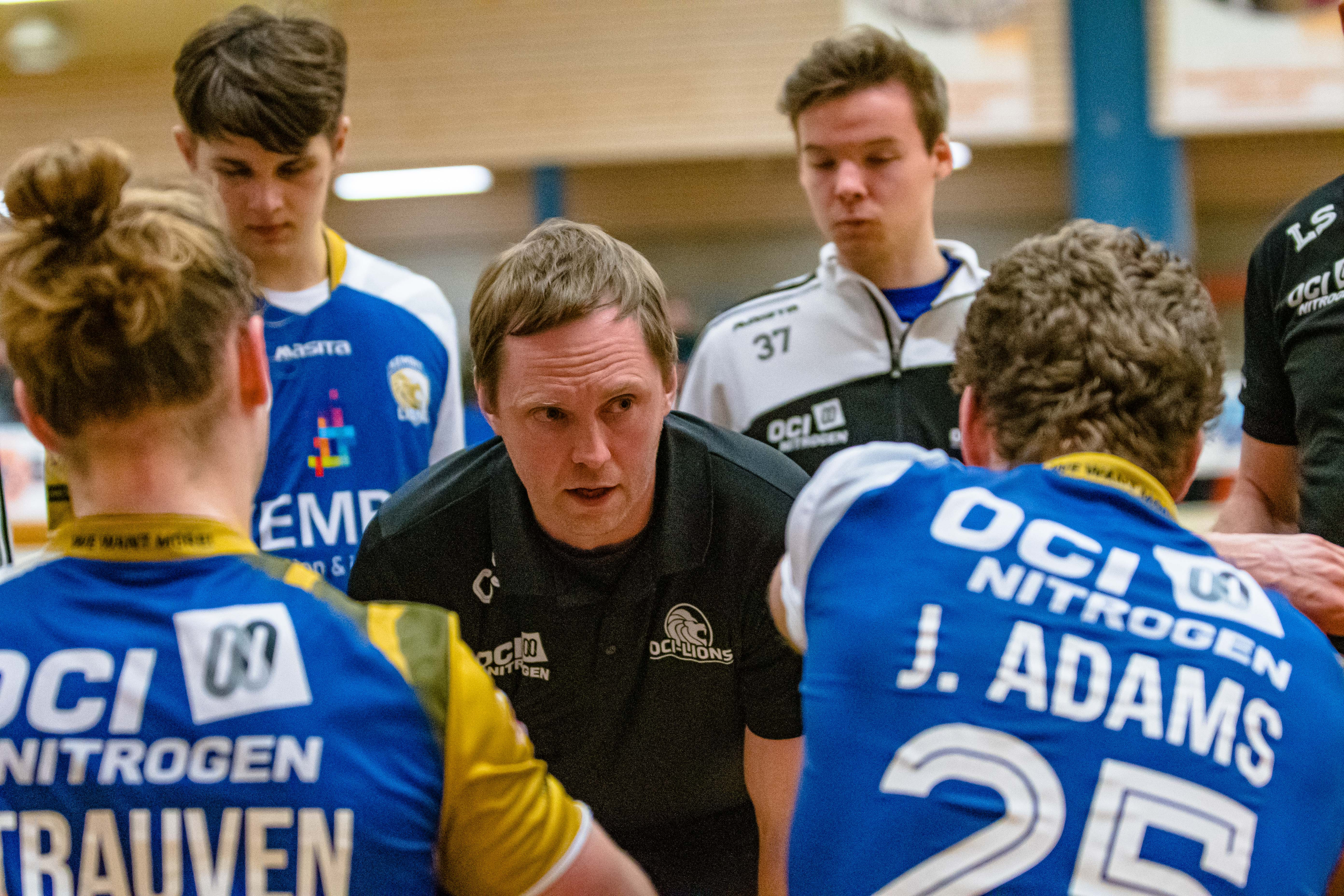
Christoph Jauernik; headcoach of Limburg Lions since 2019

Limburg Lions is a handball team from Sittard-Geleen, Limburg. The club was founded in 2008 by a merger of the men's teams of HV Sittardia from Sittard, V&L from Geleen and HV BFC from Beek. The Lions took the place of HV Sittardia in the NHV Eredivisie after the merger. The first team plays its home games at Stadssporthal (Sittard).

Limburg Lions also has a second team, which plays in the Dutch premier division, and an A-youth team, which plays in the national A-youth division.

The first team won the national championship and the Cup of the Netherlands three years in a row between 2015 and 2017. It has also won twice the Dutch Supercup and once the BENE League.

In 2016, the management of BFC decided to take no longer part in the collabation.

== Accomplishments ==
- Eredivisie:
  - Winners (3) : 2015, 2016, 2017
  - Runner-Up (5) : 2011, 2012, 2013, 2014, 2018
- BENE-League:
  - Winners (2) : 2015, 2022
  - Runner-Up (4) : 2016, 2017, 2018, 2020
- Dutch Handball Cup:
  - Winners (3) : 2015, 2016, 2017
  - Runner-Up (3) : 2013, 2014, 2019
- Dutch Supercup:
  - Winners (3) : 2016
  - Runner-Up (3) : 2015, 2017

== Team ==
=== Current squad ===
Squad for the 2025–26 season

Goalkeepers
Left Wingers
Right Wingers
Line players

Left Backs
Central Backs
Right Backs

=== Transfers ===
Transfers for the 2025–26 season

Joining

Leaving

- (Belgium) (Germany) Nick Braun (LW) to (Germany) HSG Krefeld
- (Netherlands) Jelte Hiemstra (LB) to (Austria) Handball Tirol

== Former players ==
- Lambert Schuurs (2008–2009)
- Iso Sluijters (2012–2013)
- Luc Steins (2012–2016)
