= Zwartemeer =

- Village
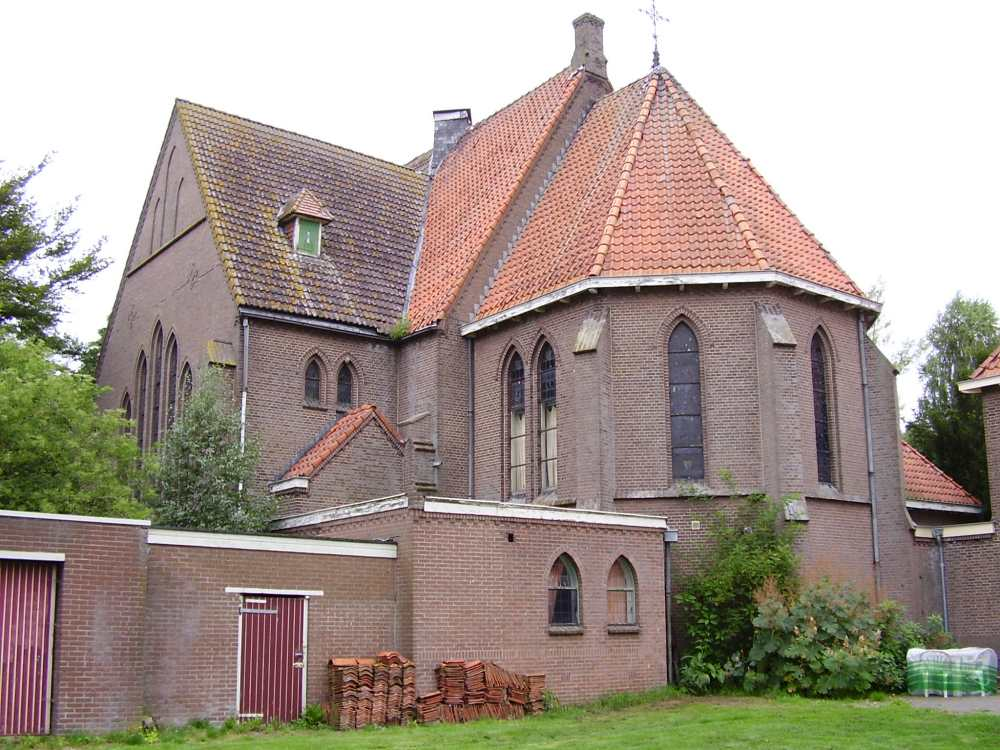
- Church in Zwartemeer

- Location in province of Drenthe in the Netherlands Zwartemeer (Netherlands)
- Coordinates: 52.7212°N 7.0390°E
- Country: Netherlands
- Province: Drenthe
- Municipality: Emmen
- Established: 1871

Area
  - Total: 16.08 km^{2} (6.21 sq mi)
- Elevation: 17 m (56 ft)

Population (2021)
  - Total: 3,025
  - Density: 188.1/km^{2} (487.2/sq mi)
- Demonym: Zwartemeerder
- Time zone: UTC+1 (CET)
  - Summer (DST): UTC+2 (CEST)
- Postal code: 7894
- Dialing code: 0591

Zwartemeer (Dutch pronunciation: [ˈzʋɑrtəˌmeːr]) is a village in the Netherlands and it is part of the Emmen municipality in Drenthe. It is located on the border with Germany.

== History ==
Zwartemeer is a linear settlement along a canal which was established in 1871 as a buckwheat settlement. It was named after the black water of the moor lake which was the source of the Runde River. The colonist were mainly from Twente and Germany and were mainly Catholic. In 1932, it was home to 2,419 people. Since 1974, a carnival is organised in Zwartemeer hosted by the carnivalsassociation of Zwartemeer CV de Veentrappers which attracts large crowds.

== Sports ==
HV Hurry-Up is a men's handball club from Zwartemeer.
Voetbalvereniging Zwartemeerse Boys is a football club from Zwartemeer.

== Notable people ==
- Jeroen Lambers (born 1980), footballer
  Roelof Bruins was Raised not born in Zwartemeer, Racing driver
  Joep Ermans winnaar Drents regionaal schaftkeetkampioenschap 2019

== Gallery ==
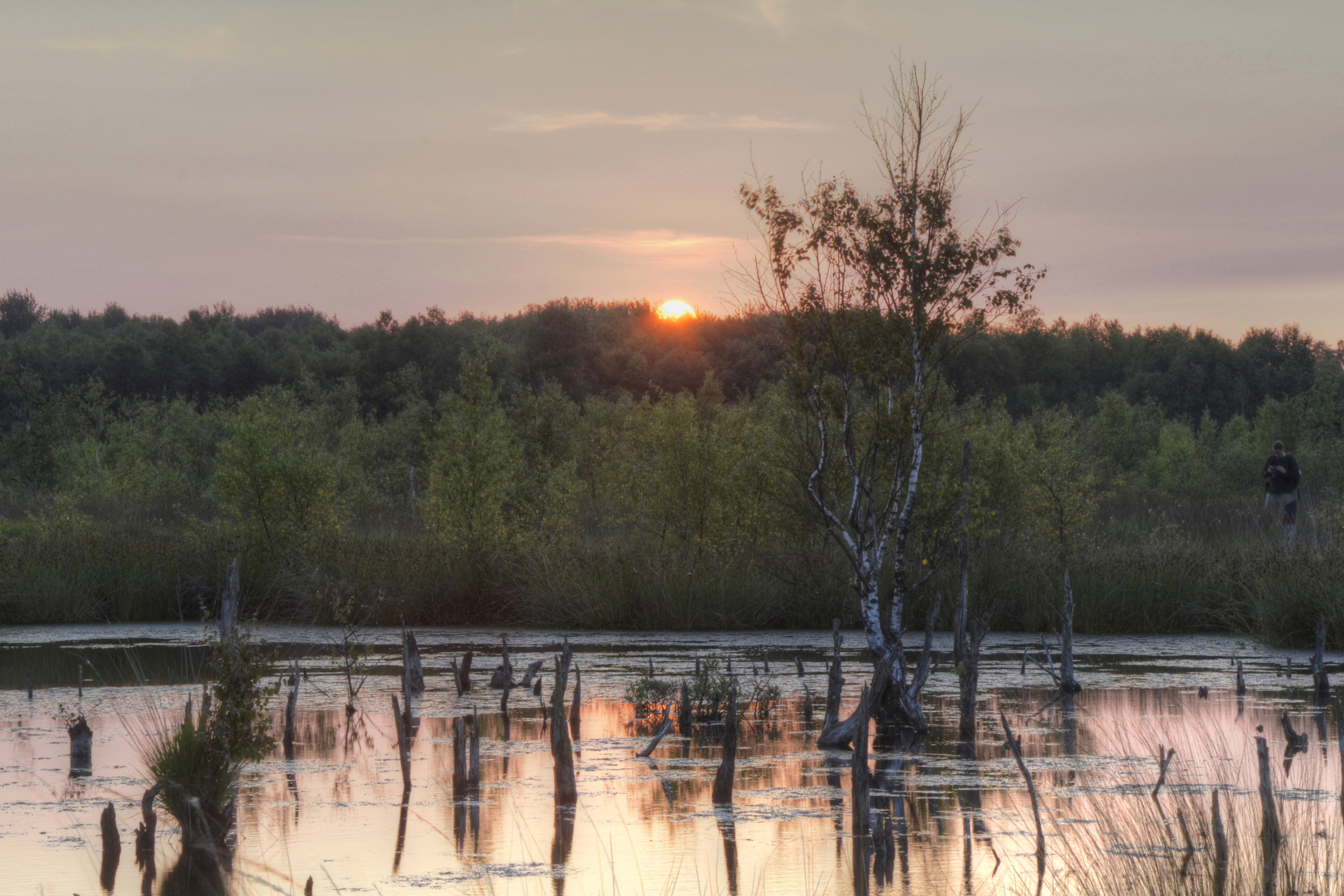
Sunset on the moor

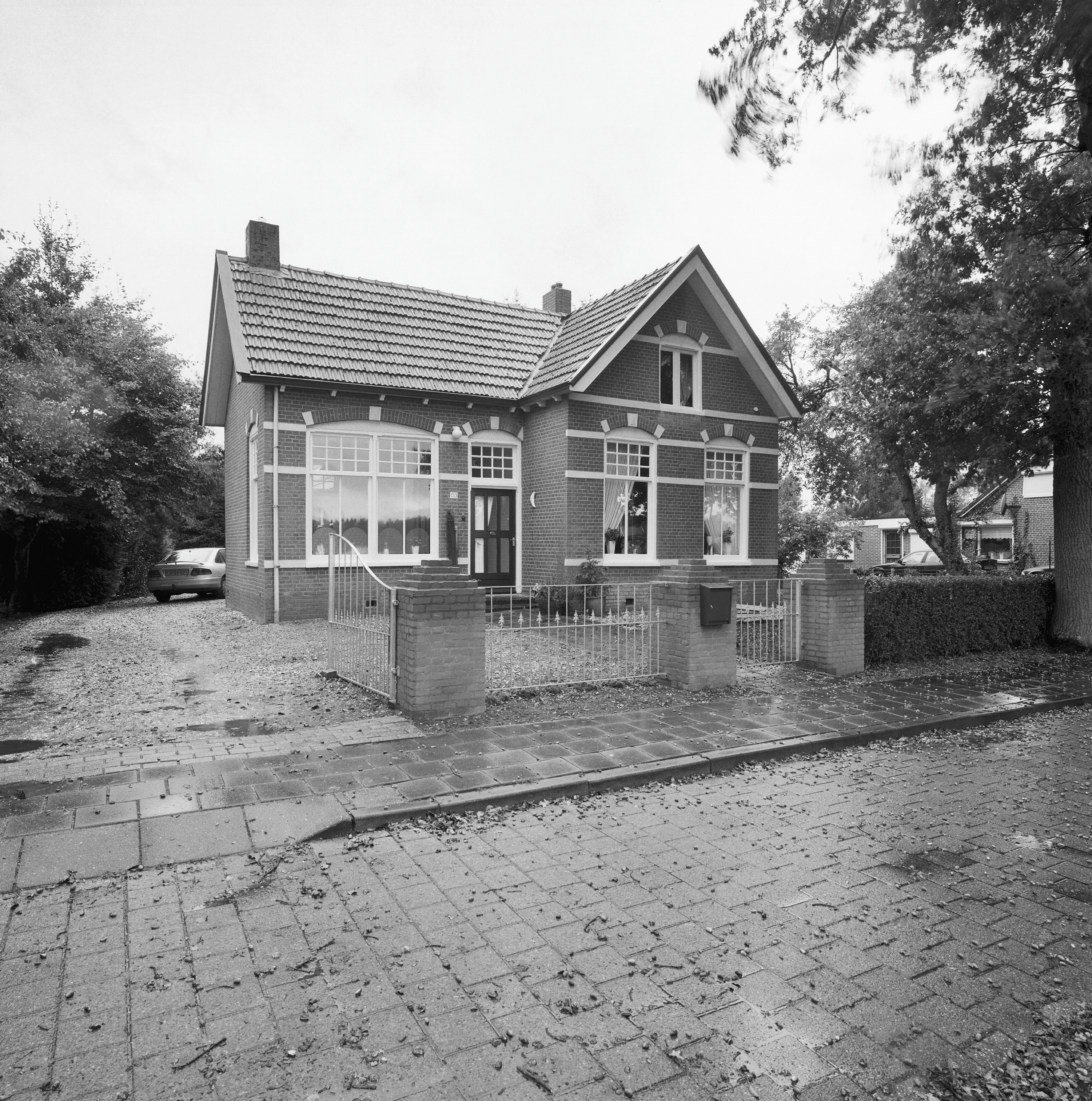
Former border house

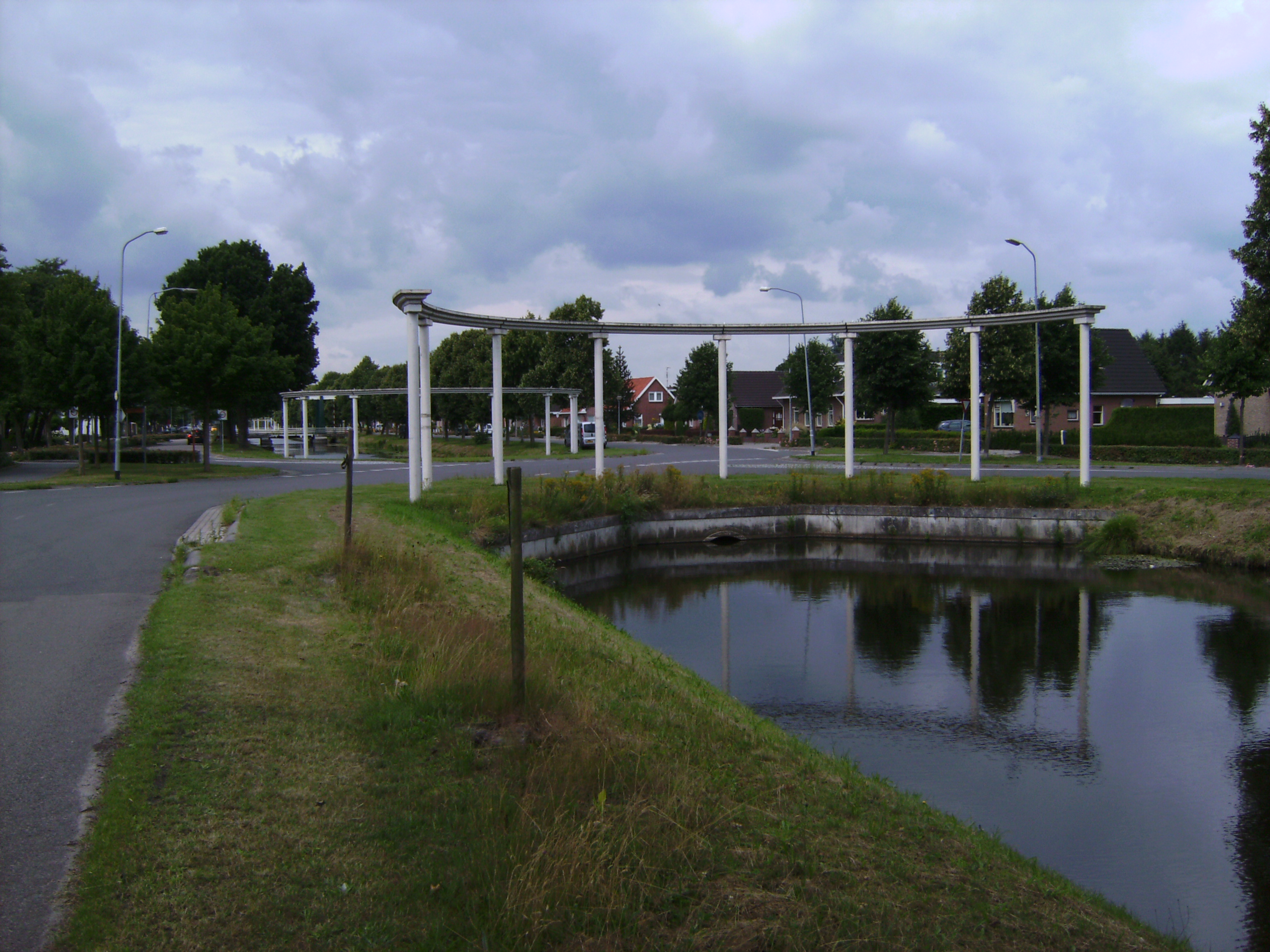
Art in Zwartemeer
