= Panningen =

Panningen Kepèl
- Town
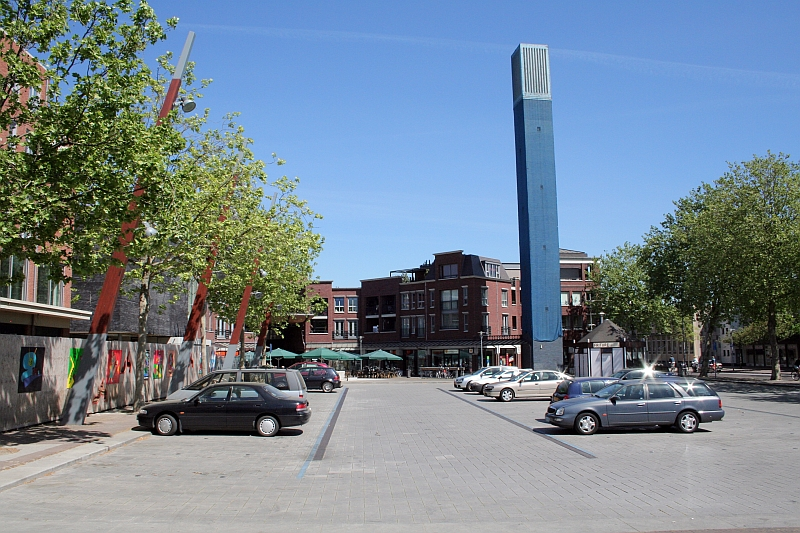

- Location in the Netherlands Location in the province of Limburg in the Netherlands
- Coordinates: 51°19′39″N 5°58′54″E
- Country: Netherlands
- Province: Limburg
- Municipality: Peel en Maas

Area
  - Total: 45.83 km^{2} (17.70 sq mi)
- Elevation: 34 m (112 ft)

Population (2021)
  - Total: 6,910
  - Density: 151/km^{2} (391/sq mi)
- Time zone: UTC+1 (CET)
  - Summer (DST): UTC+2 (CEST)
- Postal code: 5981
- Dialing code: 077

Panningen (Dutch: [ˈpɑnɪŋə(n)]; Limburgish: Kepèl) is a Dutch town with a population of 7,618 inhabitants (2020) and is the biggest settlement of the municipality Peel en Maas. It is centrally located between the cities of Roermond, Weert and Venlo in the north of the Dutch province Limburg. Before the 2010 municipal redivision, when Panningen became a part of the newly formed municipality of Peel en Maas, it was part of Helden. Together with Helden, Panningen forms a double core, the double core Helden-Panningen has 13,863 inhabitants (2020). Its nearest city, Venlo, lies about 13 km eastwards.

The built-up area of the town is 3.38 km², and contains 4,523 residences.

== Sports ==
The local handball team Bevo HC has won the Dutch Championship once, in 2014.

== Education ==
Bouwens van der Boijecollege is a public highschool in this town.

== Gallery ==
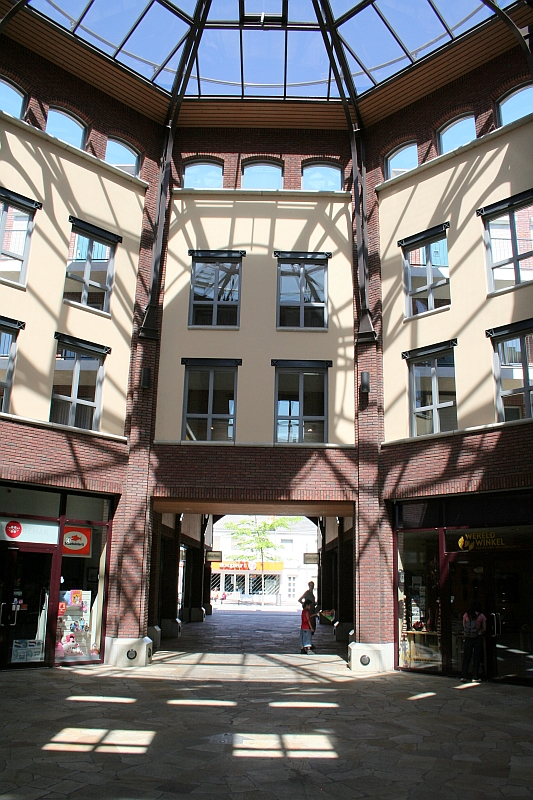
Shopping mall De Pit

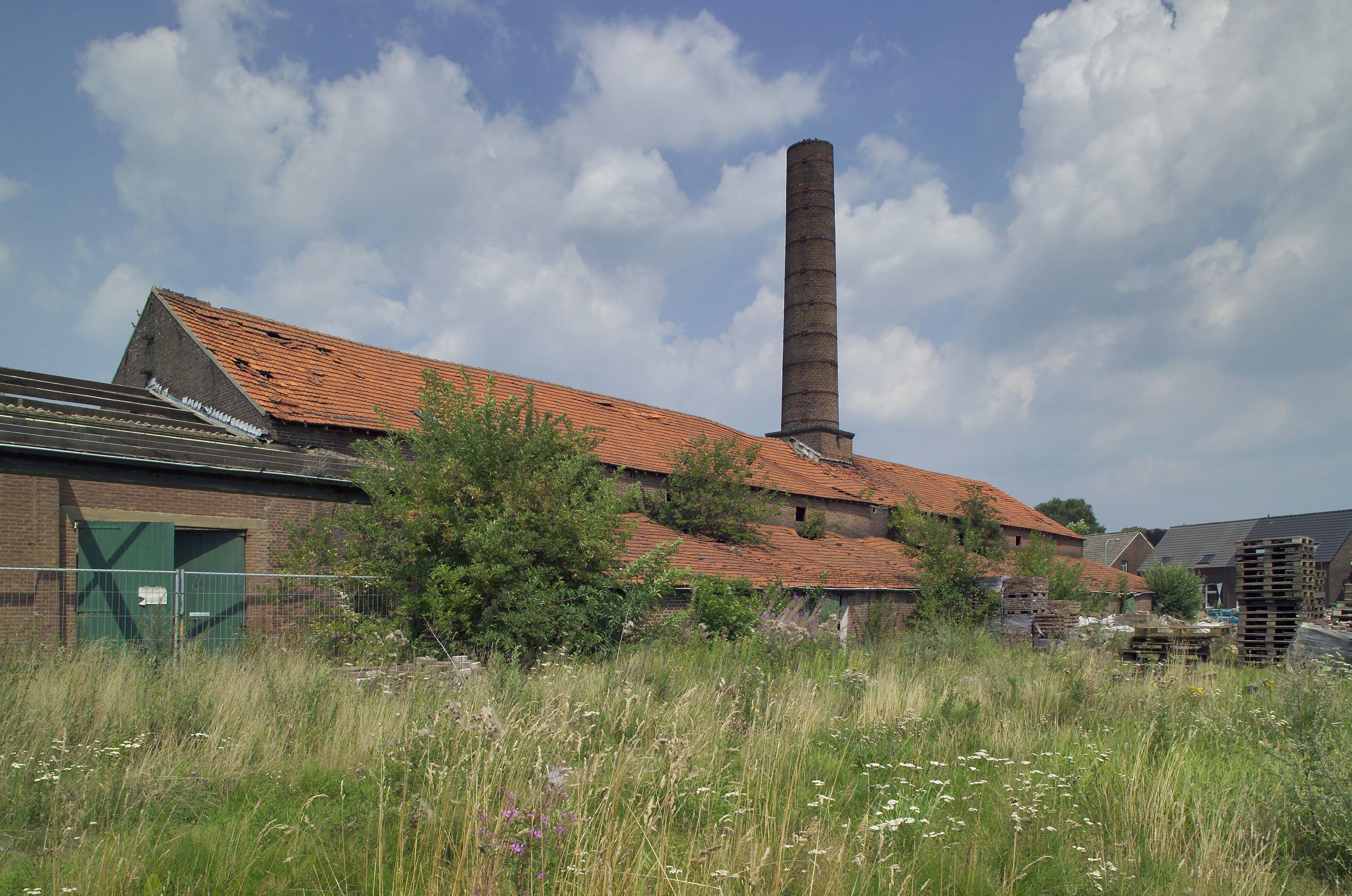
Brick works
