= Initia HC Hasselt =

Belgian handball club

Initia Hasselt
- Full name: Hubo Initia handbal Club Hasselt
- Founded: 1971
- Arena: Sporthal Alverberg
- Capacity: 1,730
- President: Luc Tack
- League: Belgian First Division
- 2013–14: 1st
Home	Away

Initia Hasselt is a handball club from Hasselt, Belgium. They currently compete in the Belgian First Division, and is the most accomplished team in Belgium with 10 Women's championships and 13 men's championships. The club was founded in 1971, while the women's team was fofunded in 1976.

== Titles ==
=== Women's team ===
- Belgian First Division: (10) 1987, 1988, 1989, 1990, 1991, 1992, 1993, 1994, 1995, 1996
- Belgian Cup: (11) 1982, 1983, 1986, 1987, 1989, 1990, 1991, 1992, 1993, 1996, 2011

=== Men's Team ===
- Belgian First Division: (13) 1984, 1985, 1986, 1993, 1994, 1995, 1996, 1997, 1998, 1999, 2011, 2013, 2014
- Belgian Second Division: 1979
- Belgian Cup: (10): 1984, 1990, 1991, 1995, 1998, 1999, 2003, 2010, 2012, 2014
- BENE-League: (2): 2014, 2016

== Crest, colours, supporters ==
=== Kits ===
HOME
2018–19; 2021-	2019–20

== Team ==
=== Current squad ===
Squad for the 2025–26 season

Goalkeepers
Left Wingers
Right Wingers

- (France) Valentin Bzdynga

Line players

Left Backs

- (Belgium) Sébastien Danesi
- (France) Mathis Mougin

Central Backs
Right Backs

=== Transfers ===
Transfers for the 2026–27 season

Joining

Leaving

- (France) Valentin Bzdynga (RW) to (France) US Ivry Handball

=== Transfer History ===
Transfers for the 2025–26 season

Joining

- (France) Valentin Bzdynga (RW) from (France) C' Chartres MHB
- (France) Mathis Mougin (LB) from (France) Grand Besançon Doubs Handball
- (Belgium) Sébastien Danesi (LB) from (France) Grand Besançon Doubs Handball

Leaving
