= RKHV Volendam =

Dutch handball club

Handbal Volendam
- Full name: Rooms Katholieke Handbalvereniging Volendam
- Founded: January 12, 1963; 63 years ago
- Arena: Sporthal Opperdam
- Capacity: 1,200
- Head coach: Geert Hinskens
- League: NHV Eredivisie
- 2024-25: 7th
Home	Away

RKHV Volendam or KRAS/Volendam (sponsor name) is a Dutch handball team located in Volendam. Their home matches are played at the Sporthal Opperdam. They compete in NHV Eredivisie and Beneliga.

== Accomplishments ==
- NHV Eredivisie:
  - Winners (7) : 2005, 2006, 2007, 2010, 2011, 2012, 2013
  - Runner-Up (2) : 2008, 2015
- Beneliga - Benelux Liga - BENE-League:
  - Winners (3) : 2010, 2011, 2012
  - Runner-Up (2) : 2009, 2013
- Dutch Handball Cup:
  - Winners (8) : 2006, 2007, 2008, 2009, 2010, 2012, 2013, 2014

== European record ==
Season	Competition	Round	Club	1st leg	2nd leg	Aggregate
2016–17	EHF Cup	R1	(France) Chambéry Savoie Handball	23–31	16–36	39–67
2017–18	EHF Cup	R1	(North Macedonia) HC Ohrid 2013	24–24	23–24	47–48
2018–19	EHF Challenge Cup	R3	(Russia) Dinamo Viktor Stavropol	32–32	24–28	56–60
2019–20	EHF Cup	R1	(Croatia) RK Poreč	23–29	28–31	51–60
2022–23	EHF European Cup	R2	(Switzerland) Wacker Thun	27–31	25–23	52–54
2023–24	EHF European Cup	R2	(Serbia) HC Dinamo	33–30	36–41	69–71
2024–25	EHF European Cup	R2	(Austria) Förthof UHK Krems	26–29	33–35	59–64
2025–26	EHF European Cup	R2	(Italy) Cassano Magnago HC	28–29	29–29	57–58
2026–27	EHF European Cup	R2	(Austria) Förthof UHK Krems	26–28	27–24	53–52
2026–27	EHF European Cup	R3	(Switzerland) BSV Bern	–	–	–

== Team ==
=== Current squad ===
Squad for the 2021-2022 season

Trainers

- (United States) Mark Ortega - Trainer
- (Netherlands) Christian Albers - 2nd Trainer

Goalkeepers

- (Netherlands) Rob Goudriaan
- (Netherlands) Dennis Schellekens
- (Netherlands) Michiel Van Gils

Wingers
RW

- (Netherlands) Robin Natgegaal
- (Netherlands) Marc Kok
- (Sweden) Filip Pettersson

LW

- (Netherlands) Jordy Baijens
- (Netherlands) Leon Geus

Line players

- (United States) Alex Binderis
- (Netherlands) Evert Kooijman
- (Netherlands) Jeroen Roefs

Back players
LB

- (Netherlands) Jelmer De Vries
- (United States) Aboubakar Fofana
- (Ukraine) Stefan Van Gils
- (Netherlands) Tim Roefs

CB

- (Netherlands) Florent Bourget
- (Netherlands) Wessel Blokzijl

RB

- (Netherlands) Marnix Roos
- (Sweden) Zlatko Pavicevic

=== Transfers ===
Transfers for the 2025–26 season

Joining

Leaving

- (Algeria) (France) Nassim Bellahcene (RB) to (Spain) Balonmano Burgos
