= HC Achilles Bocholt =

Belgian handball club

Sezoens Achilles Bocholt
- Full name: Handbalclub Sezoens Achilles Bocholt
- Nickname(s): Les Campinois
- Short name: Bocholt
- Founded: 1986; 39 years ago
- Arena: Sportcomplex De Damburg, Bocholt
- Capacity: 1,539
- President: Pascal Derkoningen
- Head coach: Luc Boiten
- League: Belgian First Division, BENE-League
- Club colours
Home	Away

HC Achilles Bocholt is a men's handball club from Bocholt, Belgium, that plays in the Belgian First Division and in the BENE-League.

Location of HC Achilles Bocholt

== History ==
Achilles Bocholt was founded in the summer of 1986 by about fifteen young people. After a year of training, the first team was formed in 1987. In the 2003/2004 season, the team won the second division, making it the first time in its history to get into the Belgian First Division. They were allowed to compete in an international cup for the first time in the 2013/14 season, in the EHF Cup. Here, the Hungarian Tatabánya KC was able to win both in Tatabánya (30-22) and in Bocholt (35-30), so the team was eliminated in the first round. During its history, 5 national championships (in 2016, 2017, 2018, 2019 and 2023), 7 Belgian Cups (in 2013, 2015, 2017, 2019, 2021, 2022 and 2023) and won 6 BENE-League (in 2013, 2017, 2018, 2019, 2020 and 2023). The colors of the club have changed many times over the years: green and white from 1987-1992, blue-white from 1992-2003, green-black from 2003-2020, and blue-black from 2020.

== Crest, colours, supporters ==
=== Naming history ===
Name	Period
Handbal Achilles Bocholt	1987–1992
Handbal Sezoens Bocholt	1992–2005
Handbal Achilles Bocholt	2005–2014
QubiQ Achilles Bocholt	2014–2020
Handbal Achilles Bocholt	2020–2022
Sezoens Achilles Bocholt	2022–present

=== Kit manufacturers ===
Period	Kit manufacturer
2014	(United States) Nike
2014 - 2017	(Germany) Jako
2017 - present	(Germany) Kempa

=== Kits ===
HOME
2013–14	2015–17	2017–18	2019–20	2020–24

AWAY
2015–17	2019–20	2022–24

== Team ==
=== Current squad ===
Squad for the 2023–24 season

Sezoens Achilles Bocholt

Goalkeepers

- 1 (Belgium) Clem Leroy
- 12 (Belgium) Stef Gijbels
- 16 (Belgium) Oracha Van Bommel
- 27 (Belgium) Wesley Snoeks

Left Wingers

- 6 (Belgium) Tristan Tielen
- 18 (Belgium) Thomas Driesen
- 22 (Belgium) Mattias Van Criekinge

Right Wingers

- 11 (Belgium) Elias Koninkx
- 30 (Belgium) Ilyas D'Hanis
- 47 (Serbia) Aleksa Кljajić

Line Players

- 8 (Belgium) Stef Jaeken
- 17 (Belgium) Joren Lamers
- 24 (Netherlands) Tim Claessens

Left Backs

- 5 (Belgium) Michiel Lamers
- 19 (Netherlands) Odirin Jerry
- 20 (Belgium) Ruben Roelants
- 44 (Belgium) Jeroen De Beule

Central Backs

- 7 (Belgium) Wout Winters
- 21 (Belgium) Jorn Ceyssens
- 25 (Belgium) Lennert Ceyssens
- 31 (Belgium) Pieter Strauven

Right Backs

- 14 (Belgium) Serge Spooren
- 99 (Belgium) Lennert Doms

=== Technical staff ===
- Head coach: (Belgium) Luc Boiten
- Assistant coach: (Belgium) Roel Valkenborgh
- Goalkeeping coach: (Netherlands) Johannes Last
- Physiotherapist: (Belgium) Patrick Maas

=== Transfers ===
Transfers for the 2023–24 season

Joining

- (Serbia) Aleksa Кljajić (RW) from (Serbia) RK Vojvodina

Leaving

- (Belgium) Roel Valkenborgh (LB) (retires)

== Previous squads ==
2018–2019 Team
Shirt No	Nationality	Player	Birth Date	Position
1	Netherlands	Björn Alberts	3 August 1978 (age 47)	Goalkeeper
4	Belgium	Brecht Wertelaers	23 July 1990 (age 35)	Right Winger
5	Belgium	Michiel Lamers	15 August 1998 (age 27)	Left Back
7	Belgium	Wout Winters	26 August 1994 (age 31)	Central Back
8	Netherlands	Evert Kooijman	28 January 1996 (age 29)	Line Player
10	Netherlands	Jordi Cremers	6 March 1990 (age 35)	Line Player
11	Belgium	Elias Koninkx	22 May 1998 (age 27)	Right Winger
12	Belgium	Stef Gijbels	23 July 1996 (age 29)	Goalkeeper
15	Belgium	Roel Valkenborgh	15 November 1988 (age 36)	Left Back
16	Belgium	Clem Leroy	27 August 1997 (age 28)	Goalkeeper
17	Belgium	Joren Lamers	19 January 1996 (age 29)	Line Player
18	Belgium	Thomas Driesen	3 September 1995 (age 30)	Left Winger
20	Belgium	Ruben Roelants	20 August 1990 (age 35)	Left Back
22	Belgium	Serge Spooren	22 November 1993 (age 31)	Right Back
24	BelgiumPoland	Damian Kedziora	18 May 1987 (age 38)	Left Winger
28	Netherlands	Martijn Meijer	28 November 1991 (age 33)	Right Back
44	BelgiumPoland	Bartosz Kedziora	31 December 1990 (age 34)	Central Back

2016–2017 Team
Shirt No	Nationality	Player	Birth Date	Position
1	Netherlands	Björn Alberts	3 August 1978 (age 47)	Goalkeeper
3	Belgium	Brecht Lamers	1 June 1994 (age 31)	Left Back
4	Belgium	Brecht Wertelaers	23 July 1990 (age 35)	Right Winger
5	Slovenia	Nejc Zmavc	6 September 1990 (age 35)	Line Player
7	Belgium	Wout Winters	26 August 1994 (age 31)	Central Back
10	Netherlands	Jordi Cremers	6 March 1990 (age 35)	Line Player
11	Belgium	Elias Koninkx	22 May 1998 (age 27)	Right Winger
12	Belgium	Stef Gijbels	23 July 1996 (age 29)	Goalkeeper
14	Netherlands	Andreas Kittel	12 February 1985 (age 40)	Right Winger
15	Belgium	Roel Valkenborgh	15 November 1988 (age 36)	Left Back
16	Belgium	Clem Leroy	27 August 1997 (age 28)	Goalkeeper
17	Belgium	Joren Lamers	19 January 1996 (age 29)	Line Player
22	Belgium	Serge Spooren	22 November 1993 (age 31)	Right Back
24	BelgiumPoland	Damian Kedziora	18 May 1987 (age 38)	Left Winger
34	Slovenia	Miha Pučnik	1 February 1988 (age 37)	Left Back
44	BelgiumPoland	Bartosz Kedziora	31 December 1990 (age 34)	Central Back

== Accomplishments ==
- Belgian First Division:
  - Winners (5) : 2016, 2017, 2018, 2019, 2023
  - Runner-Up (3) : 2010, 2013, 2014
- BENE-League:
  - Winners (7) : 2013, 2017, 2018, 2019, 2020, 2023, 2025
  - Runner-Up (2) : 2010, 2022
- Belgian Handball Cup:
  - Winners (8) : 2013, 2015, 2017, 2019, 2021, 2022, 2023, 2025

== EHF ranking ==
As of 26/10/2023

Rank	Team	Points
124	(Portugal) Belenenses	36
125	(North Macedonia) HC Butel Skopje	36
126	(Czech Republic) SKKP Handball Brno	36
127	(Belgium) Achilles Bocholt	36
128	(Greece) A.C. PAOK	36
129	(France) Saint-Raphaël Var Handball	36
130	(Switzerland) GC Amicitia Zürich	36

== Former club members ==
=== Notable former players ===
- (Belgium) Quinten Colman (2019-2021)
- (Belgium) Jeroen De Beule (2021-)
- (Belgium) Yannick Glorieux (2020-2022)
- (Belgium) (Poland) Bartosz Kedziora (2010-2019)
- (Belgium) Serge Spooren (2016-)
- (Belgium) Roel Valkenborgh (2013-2023)
- (Netherlands) Björn Alberts (2012-2020)
- (Netherlands) Tim Claessens (2020-)
- (Netherlands) Evert Kooijman (2017-2021)
- (Netherlands) Martijn Meijer (2018-2020)
- (Netherlands) Maik Onink (2008-2014)
- (Netherlands) Rutger Sanders (2005-2006)
- (Netherlands) Léon van Schie (2014-2016)
- (Netherlands) Arjan Versteijnen (2020-2022)

=== Former coaches ===
Seasons	Coach	Country
1988–1992	Nel Kremers	(Netherlands)
1992–1993	Patrick Coppens	(Belgium)
1993	Frans Van Keulen	(Netherlands)
1993–1994	Cor Borghmans	(Netherlands)
1994–1998	Ryszard Wilanowski	(Poland)
1998–2000	Tinus Hulsbosch	(Belgium)
2000–2002	Philippe Spooren	(Belgium)
2002–2003	Cor Borghmans	(Netherlands)
2003–2004	Dominiek Brinkmans	(Netherlands)
2004–2006	Ryszard Wilanowski	(Poland)
2006	Dieter Lennartz	(Germany)
2006–2010	Gabrie Rietbroek	(Netherlands)
2010	Harold Nusser	(Netherlands)
2010–2011	Gabrie Rietbroek	(Netherlands)
2011–2012	Robin Gielen	(Belgium)
2012	Stan Backus	(Netherlands)
2012–2014	Pim Rietbroek	(Netherlands)
2014	Stan Backus	(Netherlands)
2014–2022	Bart Lenders	(Belgium)
2022–	Luc Boiten	(Belgium)
