= Bocholt, Belgium =

Bocholt
- Municipality
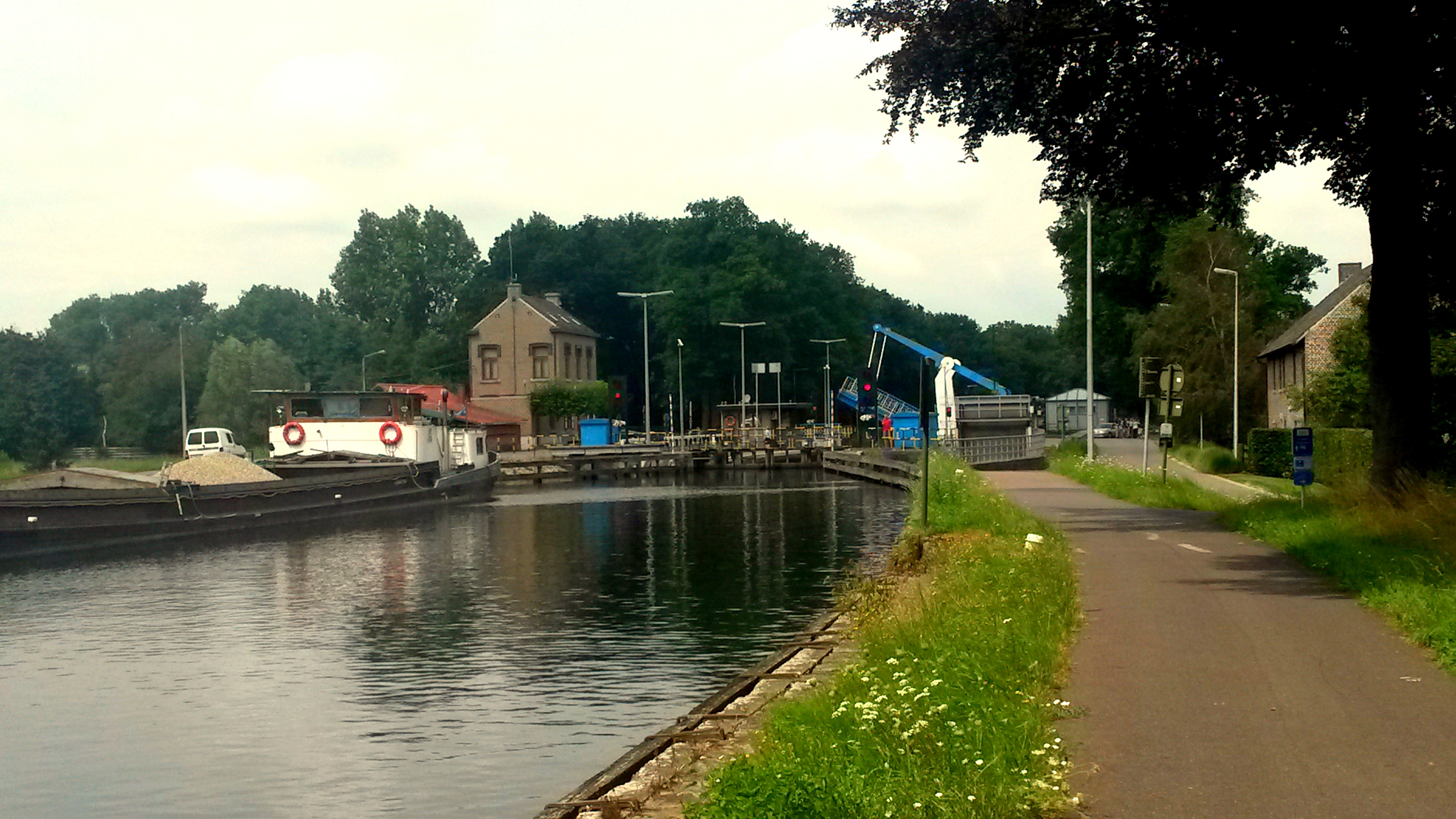
- Bridge and lock on the Zuid-Willemsvaart in Lozen, Bocholt.

- Flag Coat of arms

- Location of Bocholt in Limburg
- Interactive map of Bocholt
- Location in Belgium
- Coordinates: 51°10′N 05°35′E
- Country: Belgium
- Community: Flemish Community
- Region: Flemish Region
- Province: Limburg
- Arrondissement: Maaseik

Government
  - Mayor: Stijn Van Baelen (VIA)
  - Governing parties: VIA (CD&V), Nieuwe Unie

Area
  - Total: 59.29 km^{2} (22.89 sq mi)

Population (2018-01-01)
  - Total: 13,085
  - Density: 220.7/km^{2} (571.6/sq mi)
- Postal codes: 3950
- NIS code: 72003
- Area codes: 089
- Website: www.bocholt.be

Bocholt (Dutch pronunciation: [ˈbɔxɔlt]; Limburgish: Bóggetj [ˈboɣətʃ]) is a municipality located in the Belgian province of Limburg.

== Geography ==
Bocholt municipality is centered on Bocholt village. The municipality also includes the parishes of Kaulille, Reppel and Lozen. On 1 January 2021, Bocholt had a total population of 13,144. The total area is 59.34 km^{2} which gives a population density of 208 inhabitants per km^{2}.

== Economy ==
The big brewery Martens brewery was established in 1758. It is however safe to assume that its expansion dates from after the company started to brew Pilsner beer, which has a longer shelf life. This happened in 1923. The relatively unknown Martens Brewery has the second highest production capacity in Belgium at 360 million litres per year. It is known to produce beer for several large supermarkets chains like Aldi and Colruyt.

== Sports ==
The town is home to Achilles Bocholt handball club and football club Bocholt VV.

== History ==
The town is known for a historical event in 1910. In order to enlarge the village church, the church tower was lifted off its foudantion and moved 9,40 metres. The Italian conctracter Alberto Morglia and the American engineer Henry Weiss led the project between April and September 1910.

The Priory of Our Lady of Klaarland of the Trappistins moved to Bocholt in 1975.
