= Roel Rothkrans =

Dutch handball player (born 1979)

Personal information
- Nationality: Dutch
- Born: 31 January 1979 (age 47) Geleen, Netherlands
- Height: 1.98 m (6 ft 6 in)

Sport
- Sport: Handball
- Position: Left back

Senior clubs
- Years: Team
- 1995–2001: Vlug en Lenig
- 2001–2005: Beekse Fusie Club
- 2005–2008: Vlug en Lenig
National team
Years	Team	Apps
?–?	Netherlands	10

Teams managed
- 2008–2012: Vlug en Lenig (men, second team)
- 2016: Vlug en Lenig (women, assistant)

Roel Rothkrans (born 31 January 1979) is a Dutch retired handball player.

== Career ==
He went through the youth academy of Vlug en Lenig and was part of the first team from 1995 to 2001. In 2001 he moved to BFC where he played until 2005. After this he returned to Vlug en Lenig where he ended his playing career in 2008.

After his career as a player, he became a coach and trained the second men's team of Vlug en Lenig from 2008, coming out in the 2nd Division. After the championship in this class with this team (2012), he stopped as an active trainer for a number of years. In 2016 he again became assistant coach of the women's team of Vlug en Lenig, succeeding Nick Onink.
