= Maurice Canton =

Dutch handball coach

Personal information
- Nationality: Dutch
- Born: 3 August 1966 (age 60) Netherlands

Sport
- Sport: Handball
- Current club: BFC

Youth career
- Years: Team
- 1976–1984: Sittardia

Teams managed
- Years: Team
- –2001: Sittardia 2
- 2001–2002: BFC
- 2004–2007: Sittardia
- 2007–2009: Volendam
- 2009–2013: Limburg Lions 2
- 2013–2014: Limburg Lions
- 2016–2017: HC Tongeren
- 2019–: BFC

Maurice Canton is a Dutch handball coach. Since 2019, Canton has been the head coach of the men's team of HV BFC.

== Biography ==
Canton was a handball player when he was young, but quit at the age of eighteen. Some time later, he started coaching teams. He coached youth teams at clubs like SVM, HV Blauw-Wit and HV Sittardia.

In 2001, he became the head coach of the men's team of HV BFC, which played in the highest league in the Netherlands. Without any success, Canton quit after one year. A few years later, Canton became the trainer of the men's team of HV Sittardia, along with Jörg Bohrmann. In 2006, when Jörg Bohrmann left HV Sittardia, Canton was the sole head coach of HV Sittardia. In 2007, Canton was able to reach the finals of the Dutch league, but lost the final to Volendam. After that, he left HV Sittardia and became head coach of the men's team of Volendam. Lambert Schuurs, who had just retired as an active handball player, became the new head coach of HV Sittardia.

At Volendam, he was able to win the Dutch cup (2008 and 2009) and the Dutch Super Cup (2009). After two years in Volendam, he came back to Limburg to coach the second team of the Limburg Lions and aid the first team of the Lions as assistant coach. In 2012, he was able to win the Dutch Eerste Divisie, but could not be promoted to the Eredivisie because the first team already playing in that league. After Gabrie Rietbroek left the Lions, Canton became their head coach. Within a year, Canton was fired as head coach of the Lions. He stayed with the Lions as technical manager until 2016.

In 2016, Canton started to coach the men's team of HC Tongeren, but was fired after a little more than a year. In 2019, Canton started to coach the men's team of Beekse Fusie Club.

== Achievements ==
=== As coach ===
- Dutch cup: 2008, 2009
- Dutch Super Cup: 2009
- Dutch Eerste Divisie: 2012
