= HV Blauw-Wit (Neerbeek) =

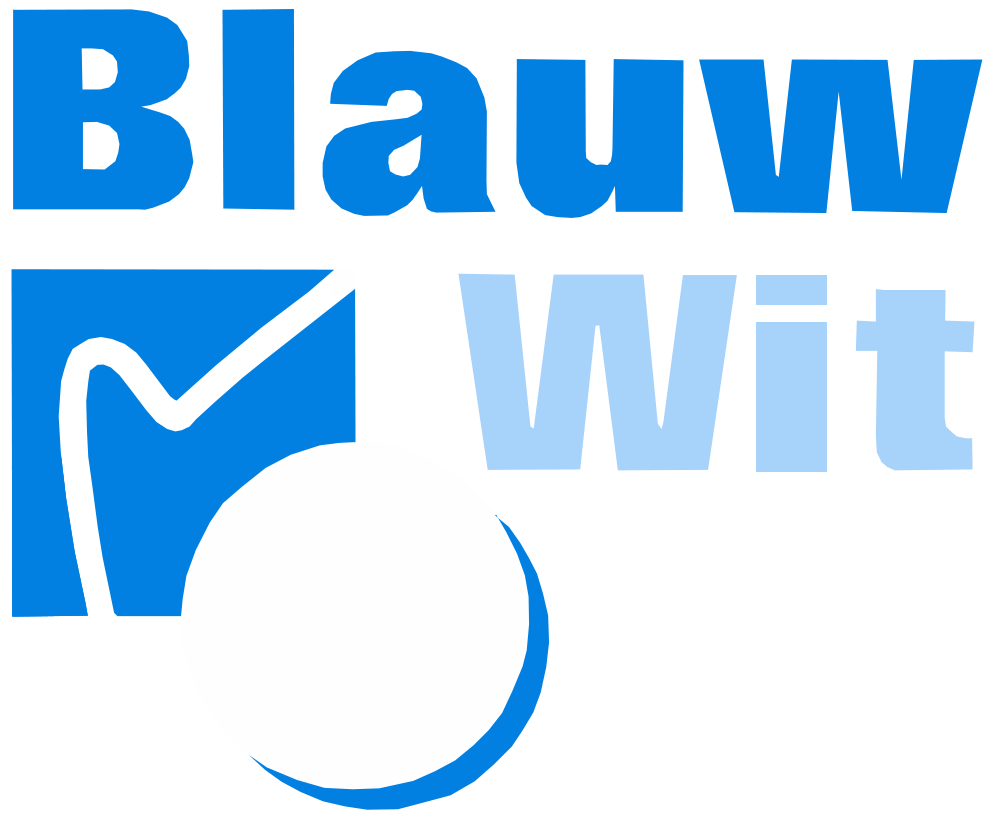
- Full name: Handbalvereniging Blauw-Wit Neerbeek
- Short name: Blauw-Wit
- Founded: 23 April 1957
- Dissolved: 1 July 1998
- Arena: De Haamen
- Club colours
Home	Away

Blauw-Wit was a handball club from Neerbeek, Limburg. Blauw-Wit played together with its rival HV Caesar in sports hall De Haamen. The men's team of Blauw-Wit won three national titles, two times the national cup and one time the Super Cup. In 1998, Blauw-Wit merged with Caesar and became Beeker Fusie Club.

== History ==
Blauw-Wit was founded in April 1957 in Neerbeek. In the fifties and sixties, the club led a fairly quiet existence, although the number of members of both the men's and women's teams grew steadily. In 1978, the men's team promoted to the Eredivisie. The team managed to win the national title in 1980 and 1981, at the expense of renowned teams such as Sittardia and Hermes. From that moment on, the club played at the highest national handball level.

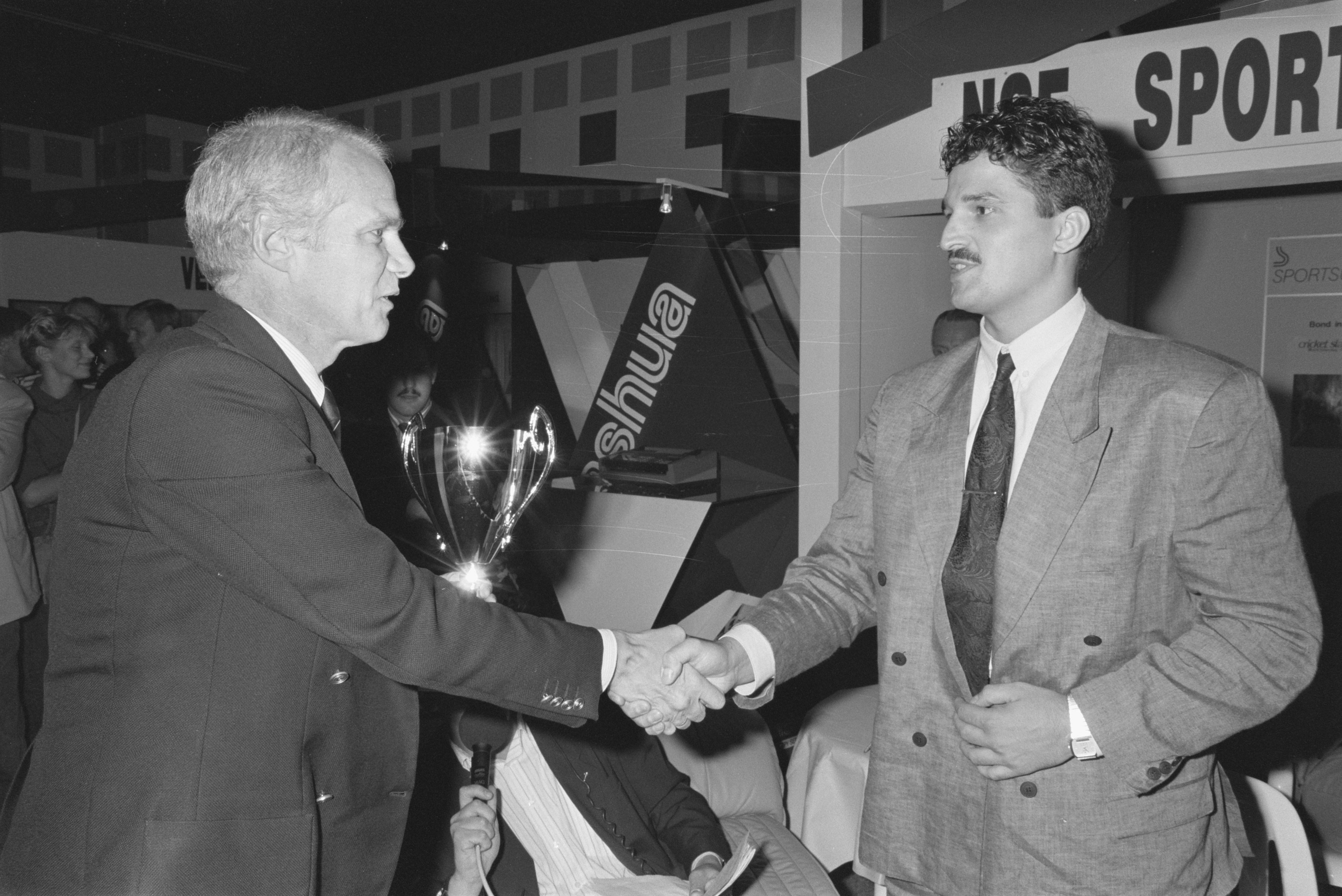
Jacques Josten (right) receives the prize for Dutch handball player of the year 1988 from the Federal President of the NHV (Luub Hafkamp, left).

In 1981, Leon Frissen became the club's president, succeeding Pim Vrancken, and he led the club into the next level of professionalisation. In 1984, Guus Cantelberg joined the men's team as coach. Together with Jacques Josten as the most striking player, along with other key players like Raymond Steijvers, Ronald Habraken, Arthur Huntjens and Paul Coenen, the group was able to win the national cup in 1986 and to the national championship in 1988.

In 1991, Guus Cantelberg and experienced players left Blauw-Wit, so it was decided to build a young team, led by goalkeeper Jacques Josten and player Raymond Steijvers. This new team contained players like Marcel Eurelings, Remco Jongen, Harold Nusser and Claus Veerman. At the end of the 1992/1993 season under the guidance of coach Peter Verjans, the team was able to reach and win the cup final.

Again the team was rejuvenated and under the leadership of coach Paul Coenen, a relatively inexperienced team managed to capture the Super Cup at the start of the 1993/1994 season against the much stronger and later national champion Sittardia. From the 1995/1996 season, the men of Blauw Wit were once again under the control of coach Guus Cantelberg. This season the team was not able to play in the play-offs. The season 1996/1997 became a turbulent season in which things changed in an organizational sense. The appointment of a technical coordinator (Guus Cantelberg) and attracting two foreign players (Johan Lindahl and Frode Carlsson).

In 1997, HV Blauw-Wit and HV Caesar were planning to merge and form one handball club in Beek. On 16 April 1998, at a special meeting of members, it was decided by a majority vote to merge the two clubs. The merger was completed on 1 July 1998, and the two handball clubs continued as Beeker Fusie Club.

== Accomplishments ==
=== Men ===
- NHV Eredivisie:
  - Winners (3) : 1980, 1981, 1988
  - Runner-Up (3) : 1978, 1979, 1982
- Dutch Handball Cup:
  - Winners (2) : 1986, 1993
  - Runner-Up (2) : 1979, 1982
- Dutch Supercup:
  - Winners (1) : 1993

== Trivia ==
- The club name Blauw-Wit stands for the colours blue and white in Dutch (translated as Blue-White).
