= Jorn Smits =

Dutch handball player (born 1992)

Personal information
- Nationality: Dutch
- Born: 3 September 1992 (age 34) Geleen, Netherlands
- Height: 1.92 m (6 ft 4 in)

Sport
- Sport: Handball
- Position: Left back

Youth career
- Years: Team
- 2001–2007: Vlug en Lenig

Senior clubs
- Years: Team
- 2007–2009: Vlug en Lenig
- 2009–2011: Limburg Lions
- 2011–2012: Skanderborg Håndbold
- 2012–2016: Volendam
- 2016–2018: Randers HK
- 2018–2020: TV Emsdetten
- 2020–2021: Volendam
- 2021: TTH Holstebro
- 2021–2024: Lemvig-Thyborøn Håndbold
- 2024-: GC Amicitia Zürich
National team
Years	Team	Apps	(Gls)
2012–	Netherlands	61	(85)
- Updated on 8 August 2024

Jorn Smits (born 3 September 1992) is a Dutch handball player for GC Amicitia Zürich and the Dutch national team.

== Career ==
Initially, Smits first practiced football at the age of 6, but his cousin asked him to participate in handball training during the winter break. He then started to play handball at V&L in Geleen. At the age of 15, Smits made his debut in the first team of V&L in the Eredivisie. Some time later, he also played in the first team of Limburg Lions led by Aleksandr Rymanov. In 2011, he went to Skanderborg Håndbold in Denmark. Smits made his debut for the national team on 5 June 2012 against Belgium.

In 2012, Smits returned to the Netherlands to play for Volendam. He grew to captain the team and became a fixture in the national team. During the time that Smits played at Volendam, the club won the national championship once, the national cup twice and the Dutch Supercup once.

In 2016 Smits moved to Danish side Randers HK and two years later he went to Germany to play for TV Emsdetten. In Germany, Smits had little playing time in Germany and in February 2020 he rejoined Volendam.

In January 2021, Smits returned to Denmark to play for TTH Holstebro with his brother.

== Personal life ==
His parents, Gino Smits and Cecile Leenen, played handball at high level. His brother Kay Smits and sister Inger Smits also play handball at a high level.
