= Schuurs =

Schuurs is a Dutch surname. Notable people with the surname include:

- Demi Schuurs (born 1993), Dutch tennis player
- Lambert Schuurs (born 1962), Dutch handball coach and long-distance runner
- Perr Schuurs (born 1999), Dutch footballer
