= Iso Sluijters =

Dutch handball player (born 1990)

Personal information
- Nationality: Dutch
- Born: 24 July 1990 (age 36) Eindhoven, Netherlands
- Height: 1.92 m (6 ft 4 in)

Sport
- Sport: Handball
- Position: Right back
- Current club: GC Amicitia Zürich
- Number: 11

Senior clubs
- Years: Team
- 2007–2008: BFC
- 2008–2010: E&O
- 2010–2011: BM Alcobendas
- 2011: HC Erlangen
- 2011–2012: SDC San Antonio
- 2012–2013: Limburg Lions
- 2013–2014: Elverum Håndball
- 2014–2016: TV Emsdetten
- 2016–2021: NMC Górnik Zabrze
- 2021–2025: GC Amicitia Zürich
National team
Years	Team	Apps	(Gls)
2009–	Netherlands	104	(191)
- Updated on 22 August 2026

Iso Sluijters (born 24 July 1990) is a Dutch handball player for GC Amicitia Zürich and the Dutch national team.

He represented the Netherlands at the 2020 European Men's Handball Championship.
