= Inger Smits =

Dutch handball player (born 1994)

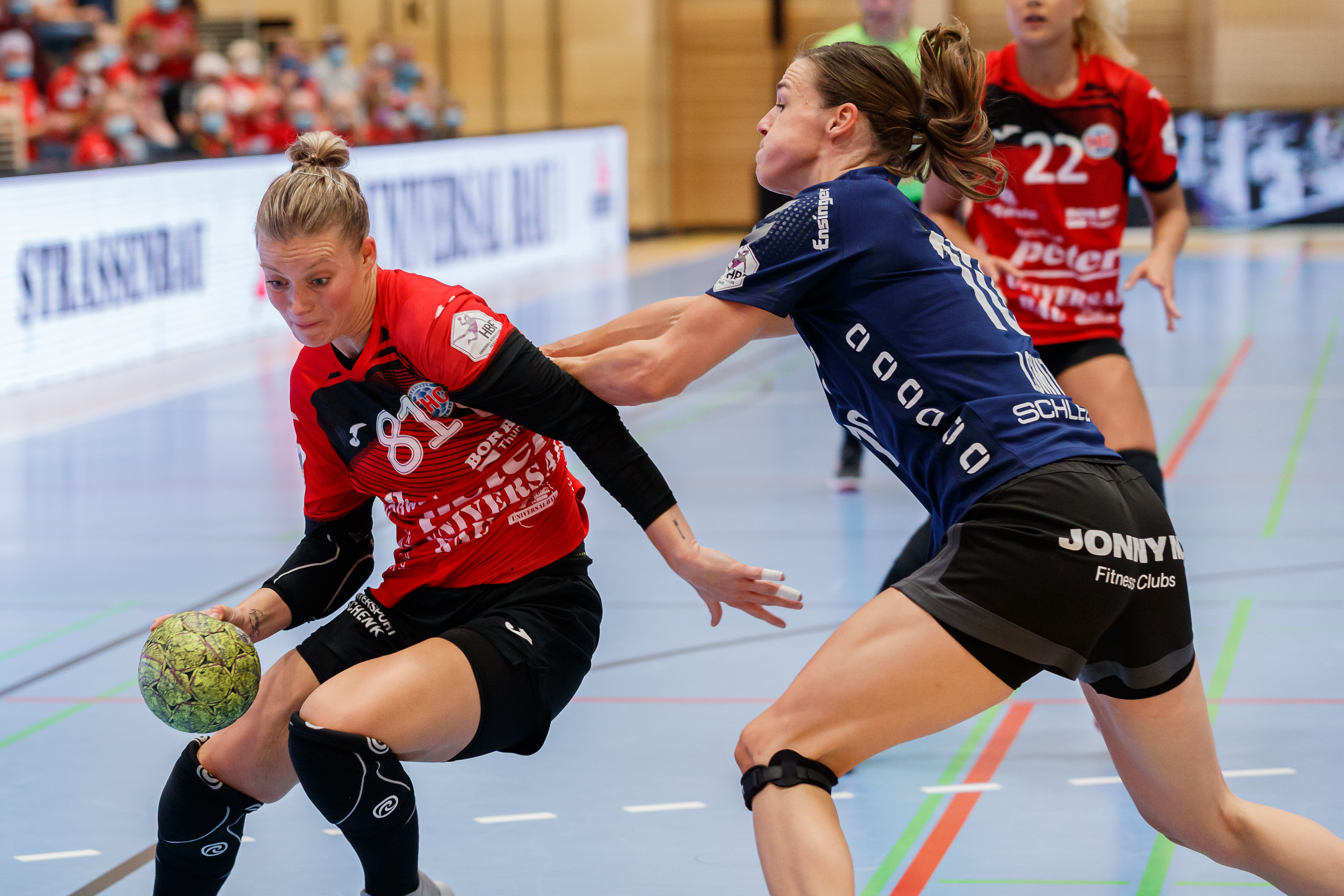
- Inger Smits (right) in a 2021 Handball-Bundesliga game

Personal information
- Nationality: Dutch
- Born: 17 September 1994 (age 32) Geleen, Netherlands
- Height: 1.79 m (5 ft 10 in)

Sport
- Sport: Handball
- Position: Centre back
- Current club: SCM Râmnicu Vâlcea
- Number: 10

Senior clubs
- Years: Team
- –2011: V&L
- 2011–2013: HandbaL Venlo
- 2013–2015: SV Dalfsen Handbal
- 2015–2017: VfL Oldenburg
- 2017–2019: TTH Holstebro
- 2019–2021: Borussia Dortmund
- 2021–2024: SG BBM Bietigheim
- 2024–2026: CSM București
- 2026-: SCM Râmnicu Vâlcea
National team
Years	Team	Apps	(Gls)
2013–	Netherlands	116	(204)
Medal record
World Championship
Gold medal – first place	2019 Japan
European Championship
Bronze medal – third place	2018 France
- Updated on 1 November 2024

Inger Smits (born 17 September 1994) is a Dutch handball player for Romanian club SCM Râmnicu Vâlcea and the Dutch national team.

She was a part the Netherlands team that won the 2019 World Women's Handball Championship; the first title in the country's history.

== Career ==
Smits started playing handball at her hometown club V&L. In 2011 she joined HandbaL Venlo, where she played for two years before moving to SV Dalfsen. Here she won the Dutch championship in 2014 and 2015 and the Dutch cup and Supercup in 2015.

In 2015 she joined VfL Oldenburg. Two years later she joined Danish side Team Tvis Holstebro. Two years later she returned to Germany when she joined Borussia Dortmund. Here she won the German championship in 2021.

In the summer of 2021 she joined league rivals SG BBM Bietigheim. Here she won the 2021, 2022 and 2023 DHB-Supercup, the 2022, 2023 and 2024 German championship, the 2022 European League and the 2023 DHB-Pokal.

In 2024 she joined Romanian CSM București, where she played for two seasons before joining Romanian rivals, SCM Râmnicu Vâlcea.

=== National team ===
Smits played 37 games for the Dutch youth team.

At the 2018 European Championship she won bronze medals, although she only played in the last match, the third place playoff.

At the 2019 World Championship in Japan she won gold medals with the Dutch team, beating Spain in the final 30:29 She was however injured during the first round and was replaced by Delaila Amega.

At the 2020 Olympics she also represented the Dutch team.

At the 2023 World Championship she and the Netherlands finished 5th. She scored 8 goals during the tournament.

== Private life ==
Her father Gino Smits and mother Cecile Leenen were also handball players. Her brothers Kay and Jorn are also international handball players.

== Achievements ==
- EHF European League:
  - Winner: 2022
- German Bundesliga:
  - Winner: 2021, 2022, 2023, 2024
- DHB Supercup:
  - Winner: 2021, 2022, 2023
- DHB-Pokal:
  - Winner: 2022, 2023
- Dutch Eredivisie
  - Winner: 2014, 2015
- NHV Cup
  - Winner: 2014, 2015
- Dutch Supercup
  - Winner: 2014, 2015
