= GC Amicitia Zürich (men's handball) =

Defunct Swiss handball club

- Full name: Grasshopper Club Amicitia Zürich
- Short name: GCA
- Founded: August 23, 2010; 16 years ago
- Dissolved: June 30, 2025; 16 months ago
- Arena: Saalsporthalle, Zürich
- Capacity: 2,500
- President: Philip Hohl
- Head coach: Werner Bösch
- League: Swiss Handball League
- Club colours
Home	Away

GC Amicitia Zürich was a Swiss team handball club from Zürich, that played in the Swiss Handball League.

Location of GC Amicitia Zürich

== History ==
The club was founded on August 23, 2010, by the merger of the handball clubs ZMC Amicitia Zürich and Grasshopper Club Zürich. The name Amicitia is of Latin origin and means friendship. The team won the Swiss Cup in 2022 after defeating Pfadi Winterthur 30:28 after extra time in the final. The team lost 32-25 to the Kadetten Schaffhausen team in the 2022 Super Cup final.

The club has filed for bankruptcy on June 25, 2025, and was confirmed bankrupt on June 30, 2025.

== Crest, colours, supporters ==
=== Kits ===
HOME

2011–15

AWAY
2011–13	2013–14

== Sports Hall information ==
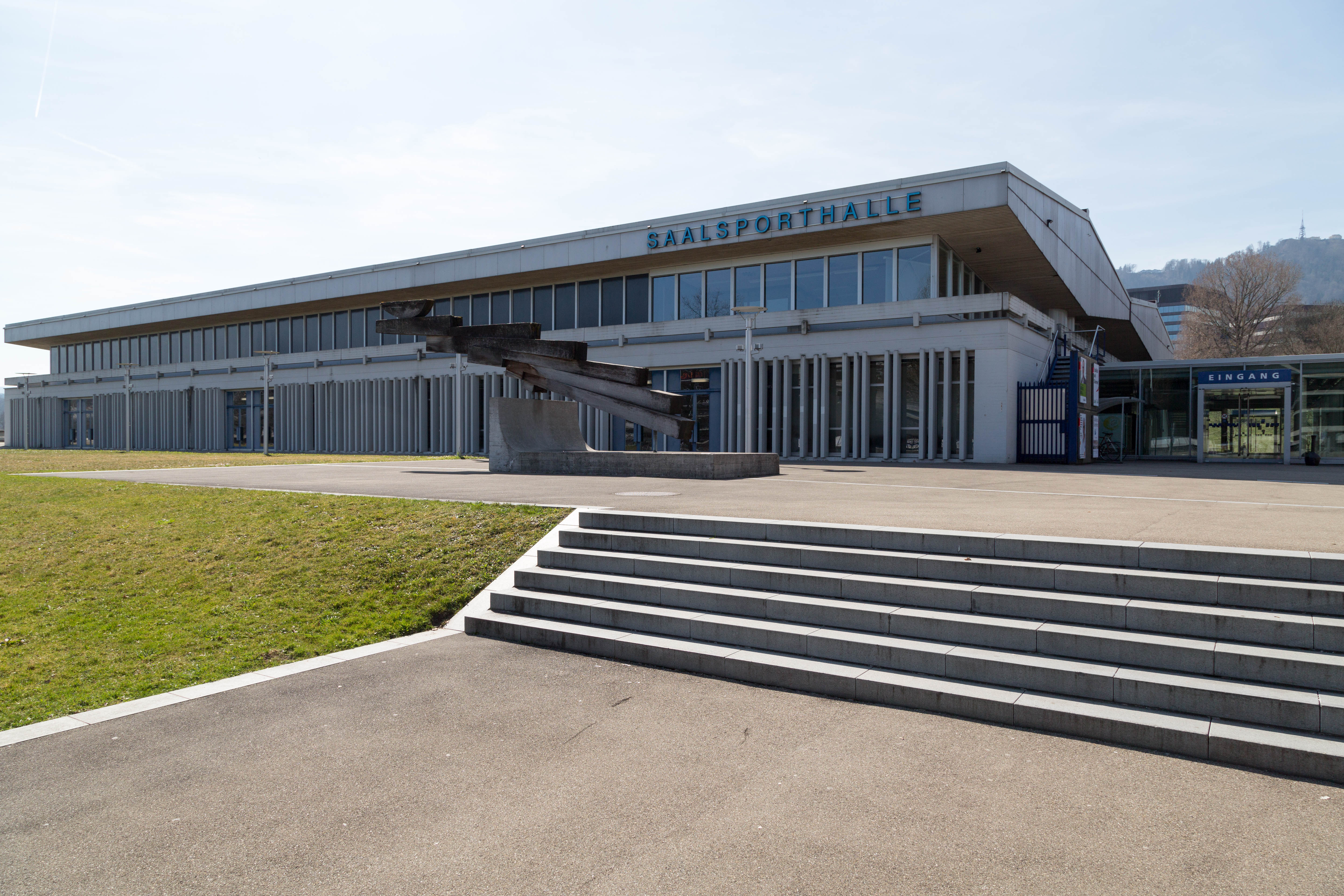
Home hall: Saalsporthalle

- Arena: - Saalsporthalle
- City: - Zürich
- Capacity: - 2500
- Address: - Giesshübelstrasse 41, 8045 Zürich, Switzerland

== Management ==
Position	Name
President	(Switzerland) Philip Hohl
Vice President	(Switzerland) Walter Müller
Sports Director	(Hungary) Gábor Vass

== Team ==
=== Current squad ===
Squad for the 2024–25 season

GC Amicitia Zürich

Goalkeepers

- 1 (Germany) Arne Fuchs
- 16 (Belarus) Viachaslau Saldatsenka
- 31 (Switzerland) Tim Müller

Left Wingers

- 15 (Switzerland) Gion Hayer
- 22 (Switzerland) Noah Grau

Right Wingers

- 5 (Switzerland) Lukas Osterwalder
- 9 (North Macedonia) Martin Popovski
- 24 (Czech Republic) David Poloz

Line Players

- 4 (Serbia) Igor Čagalj
- 21 (Switzerland) Marc Bader
- 23 (Kosovo) Luigj Quni

Central Backs

- 13 (Czech Republic) David Flajsar
- 17 (Switzerland) Jann Bamert
- 32 (Switzerland) Flurin Platz
- 87 (Slovenia) Janus Lapajne

Left Backs

- 7 (Switzerland) Yann Thümena
- 27 (Netherlands) Jorn Smits

Right Backs

- 11 (Netherlands) Iso Sluijters

=== Technical staff ===
- Head coach: (Austria) Werner Bösch
- Assistant coach: (Switzerland) Simon Schild
- Goalkeeping coach: (Switzerland) Tobias Wipf
- Physiotherapist: (Netherlands) Marc van Welie
- Physiotherapist: (Greece) Dimitrios Zacharakis
- Club doctor: (Switzerland) Andreas Platz

=== Transfers ===
Transfers for the 2026–27 season

Joining

- (Germany) Sven Ehrig (RW) from (Denmark) TTH Holstebro

Leaving

- (Czech Republic) David Poloz (RW) to (Czech Republic) Talent Plzeň
- (Germany) Arne Fuchs (GK) to (Austria) SC Ferlach

=== Transfer history ===
Transfers for the 2025–26 season

Joining

Leaving

- (North Macedonia) Martin Popovski (RW) to (Switzerland) HSC Suhr Aarau
- (Belarus) Viachaslau Saldatsenka (GK) to (Serbia) RK Vojvodina
- (Sweden) Markus Stegefelt (LB) to (Romania) CSM București
- (Slovenia) Janus Lapajne (CB) to (Kuwait) Kazma SC
- (Switzerland) Marc Bader (LP) to (Switzerland) HC Kriens-Luzern

Transfers for the 2024–25 season

Joining

- (Netherlands) Jorn Smits (LB) from (Denmark) Lemvig-Thyborøn Håndbold
- (Germany) Arne Fuchs (GK) from (Germany) TUSEM Essen
- (Czech Republic) David Flajsar (CB) from (Czech Republic) TJ Sokol Nové Veselí
- (Switzerland) Noah Grau (LW) from (Switzerland) TV Endingen
- (Sweden) Markus Stegefelt (LB) from (Sweden) IF Hallby

Leaving

- (Croatia) Ante Kaleb (CB)
- (Poland) Paul Bar (GK)
- (Switzerland) Roman Bachmann (GK)
- (Switzerland) Adrian Blättler (LW)
- (Switzerland) Mael Tobler-Larocque (LB)
- (Switzerland) Filip Maros (CB)

== Accomplishments ==
- Swiss Handball Cup:
  - Gold: 2022
- Swiss SuperCup:
  - Silver: 2022

== EHF ranking ==
As of 5/12/2025

Rank	Team	Points
129	(Poland) Ostrów Wielkopolski	34
130	(Bosnia and Herzegovina) RK Sloga	33
131	(Switzerland) HSC Suhr Aarau	32
132	(Switzerland) GC Amicitia Zürich	32
133	(Lithuania) Granitas-Karys Kaunas	31
134	(Netherlands) HV. KRAS/Volendam	31
135	(Turkey) Beykoz BLD SK	31

== Former club members ==
=== Notable former players ===
==== Goalkeepers ====
- (Switzerland) Flavio Wick (2015–2017)
- (Austria) (Serbia) Nikola Marinovic (2019–2022)
- (Belarus) Viachaslau Saldatsenka (2022–)

==== Right wingers ====
- (Switzerland) Severin Ramseier (2011–2012, 2014–2016)
- (Czech Republic) David Poloz (2021–2026)
- (North Macedonia) Martin Popovski (2020–)

==== Left wingers ====
- (Switzerland) Adrian Blättler (2021–2024)

==== Line players ====
- (Switzerland) Lukas Laube (2022–2023)
- (Switzerland) Iwan Ursic (2013–2014)
- (Israel) Tomer Bodenheimer (2021–2022)
- (Kosovo) Luigj Quni (2020–)
- (North Macedonia) Filip Arsenovski (2023)

==== Left backs ====
- (Switzerland) Luka Maros (2011–2013)
- (Belarus) Hleb Harbuz (2022–2023)
- (Belarus) Anton Prakapenia (2021–2022)
- (Canada) (Germany) Tim Sartisson (2017–2020)
- (Croatia) Goran Bogunović (2013–2014)
- (Croatia) Marko Matić (2020–2021)
- (Iceland) Ólafur Guðmundsson (2022–2023)
- (Montenegro) Stevan Vujović (2015)
- (Netherlands) Jorn Smits (2024–)

==== Central backs ====
- (Switzerland) Albin Alili (2018–2021)
- (Switzerland) (Tunisia) Mehdi Ben Romdhane (2021–2022)
- (Croatia) Ante Kaleb (2023–2024)
- (Czech Republic) Jakub Szymanski (2019–2021)
- (Denmark) Matias Helt Jepsen (2015–2017)
- (Hungary) Gábor Császár (2021–2022)

==== Right backs ====
- (Cuba) Jorge Pabán (2020–2021)
- (Czech Republic) Tomáš Řezníček (2020–2022)
- (Netherlands) Iso Sluijters (2021–2025)
