= Esther Schop =

Dutch handball player (born 1990)

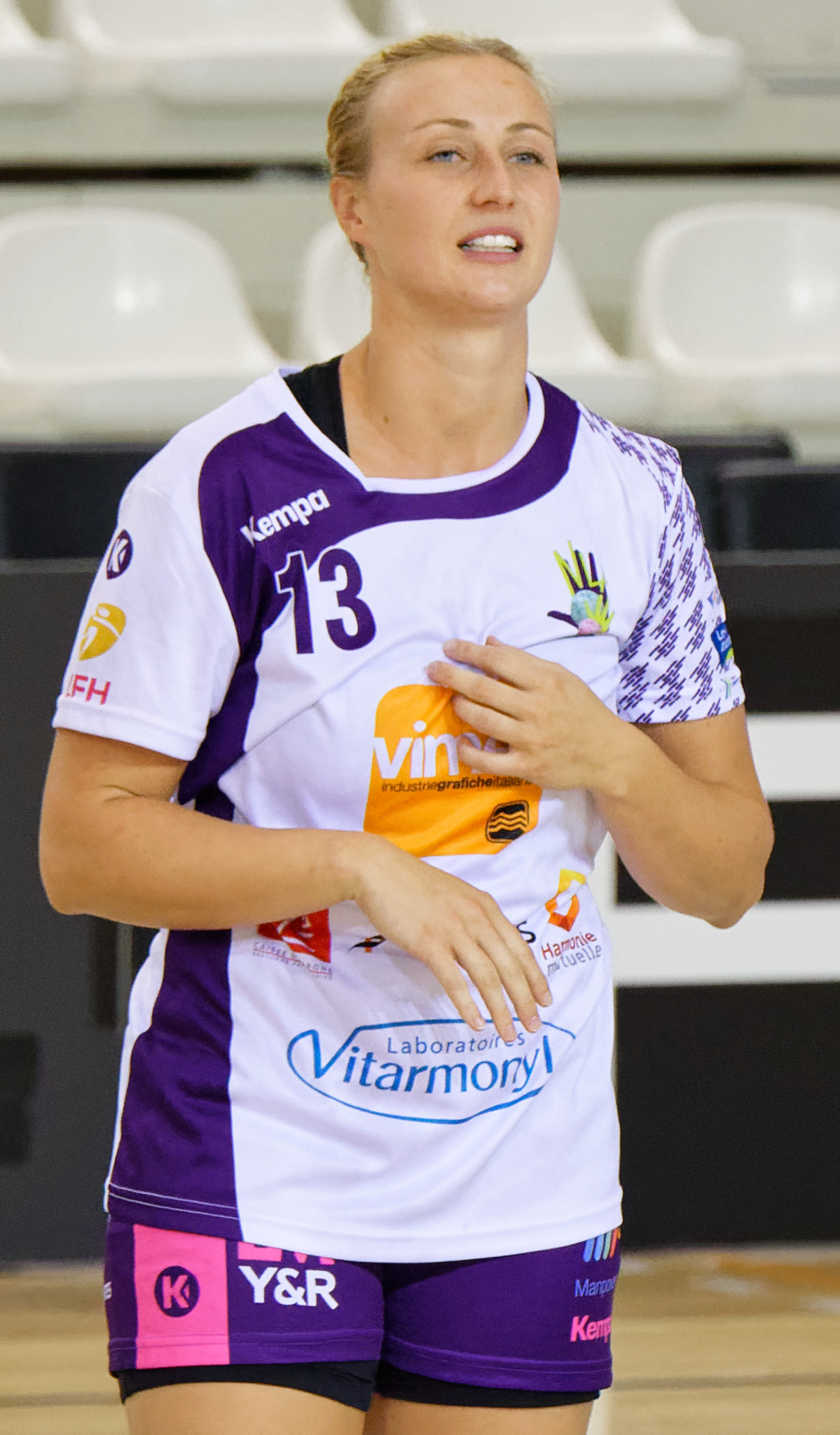

Personal information
- Nationality: Dutch
- Born: 22 January 1990 (age 36) Alkmaar, Netherlands
- Height: 1.76 m (5 ft 9 in)

Sport
- Sport: Handball
- Position: Pivot
- Number: 2

Senior clubs
- Years: Team
- 2008-2010: Westfriesland SEW
- 2010-2011: Emmen & Omstrek Handball
- 2011-2015: SV Dalfsen Handbal
- 2015-2017: Nantes Loire Atlantique Handball
- 2017-2018: Le Havre AC
National team
Years	Team	Apps	(Gls)
2009-2017	Netherlands	27	(16)

Esther Schop (born 22 January 1990) is a former Dutch handball player, who last played for Le Havre until 2018 and the Dutch national team.
