= Tess Lieder =

Dutch handball player (born 1993)

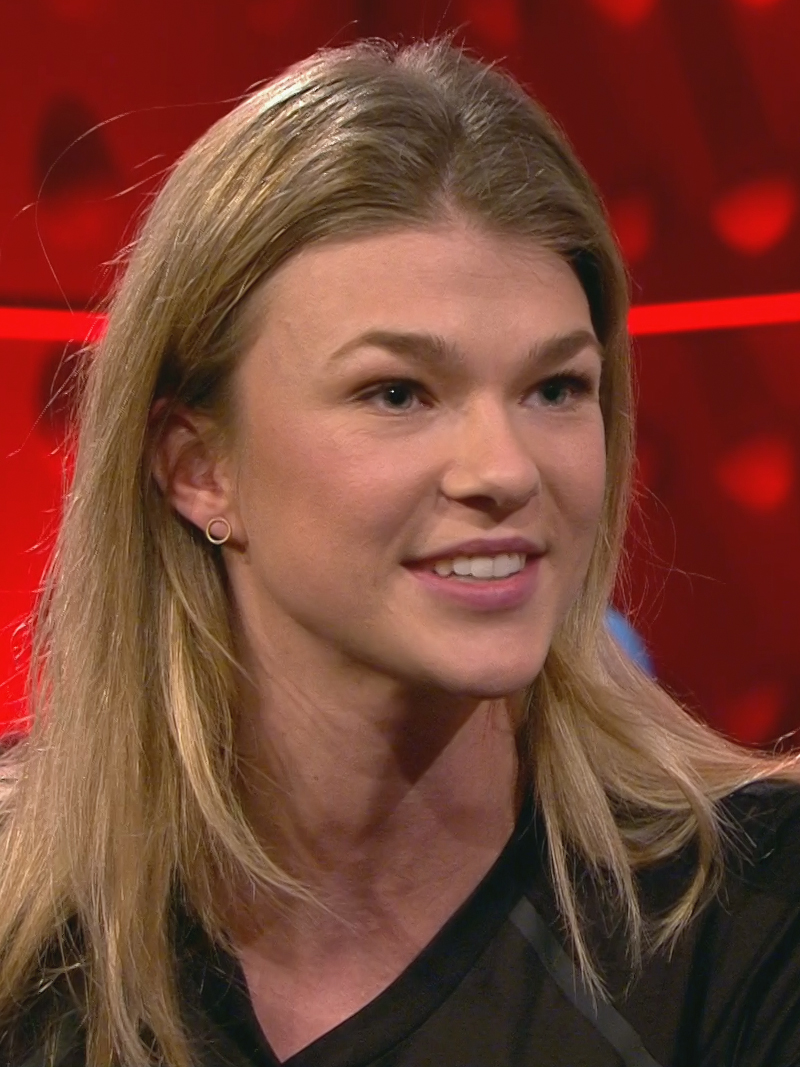
- Tess Wester (2018)

Personal information
- Nationality: Dutch
- Born: 19 May 1993 (age 33) Heerhugowaard, Netherlands
- Height: 1.78 m (5 ft 10 in)

Sport
- Sport: Handball
- Position: Goalkeeper

Youth career
- Years: Team
- 1999–2007: Hugo Girls
- 2007–2008: VZV
- 2008–2011: HandbalAcademie

Senior clubs
- Years: Team
- 2008–2010: VOC Amsterdam
- 2010–2011: E&O Emmen
- 2011–2015: VfL Oldenburg
- 2015–2018: SG BBM Bietigheim
- 2018–2021: Odense Håndbold
- 2021–2022: CSM București
- 2023–2025: Borussia Dortmund Handball
National team
| Years | Team | Apps | (Gls) |
| 2012–2024 | Netherlands | 144 | (12) |
Medal record
Representing the Netherlands
World Championship
| Gold medal – first place | 2019 Japan |
| Silver medal – second place | 2015 Denmark |
| Bronze medal – third place | 2017 Germany |
European Championship
| Silver medal – second place | 2016 Sweden |
| Bronze medal – third place | 2018 France |
Youth World Championship
| Bronze medal – third place | 2010 Dominican Republic |
Junior European Championship
| Silver medal – second place | 2011 Netherlands |

Tess Lieder (née Wester, born 19 May 1993) is a Dutch retired handballer for the Dutch national team.

A full international with the Dutch national team since 2012, she was a part the Netherlands team that won the 2019 World Women's Handball Championship; the first title in the country's history. She was also on the team that won the silver medal in the 2015 World Women's Handball Championship with the Dutch team and became the goalkeeper with the highest percentage of saves in the tournament. Wester also reached fourth place with the Dutch team in the 2016 Summer Olympics.

== Career ==
Wester started her career in 1999 at Hugo Girls, at the age of 5–6. In her youth career she also played for VZV and HandbalAcademie.

She played in the EHF Champions League with VOC Amsterdam in the 2008–09 season. Wester played in E&O Emmen from 2010 until 2011.

In 2011, she was signed for German club VfL Oldenburg, playing in the club until 2015 winning the German Cup in 2012. Wester was signed for Bundesliga club SG BBM Bietigheim. She won Bundesliga title with them and played in Champions League.

In 2018 she decided to take a step forward in her career and signed a contract with the ambitious Danish team, Odense Håndbold. Here she won the Danish championship in 2021, the first national title in club history.

After her contract with Odense expired in 2021, she signed for Romanian club CSM București. She explained her decision was influenced by the fact that "CSM is a top team where expectations are high. That suits me well." as well as "This club not only wants to win the Champions League, but also has the experience to do so. ... I want to feel that trigger."

On the 21st of April 2022 it was announced that she informed her club, CSM about leaving at the end of the season with the intention of moving closer to her homeland. At the beginning of May 2022 she announced her pregnancy via Instagram.

In April 2025 she announced her intention to retire after the 2024–25 season to get more time with her family.

== International career ==
Wester played for the first time with the Dutch team in a friendly match against Romania on 2 October 2012.

She played in the 2015 World Women's Handball Championship with the Dutch team, achieving the final of the tournament, but losing against Norway 23–31. This was the first time, Netherlands won a medal at a major international tournament.

She was called up to represent in the Dutch handball team in the 2016 Summer Olympics, achieving the fourth place after losing in the semi-finals against France 23–24, and in the bronze medal match against Norway 26–36.

In 2019 she was a part of the Dutch team that won gold medals at the 2019 World Championship for the first time ever. In the final she was involved in a controversial penalty, when Ainhoa Hernandez illegally blocked Lieders' pass to start a counter with seconds remaining and the score being 29-29. Dutch teammate Lois Abbingh would go on to convert the penalty, which won them the game.

== Honours ==
Club competitions

- Romanian Cup:
  - Winner: 2022
- Romanian Supercup:
  - Finalist: 2021
- Damehåndboldligaen:
  - Winner: 2021
- Bundesliga:
  - Winner: 2017
- German Cup:
  - Winner: 2012

National team

- Youth World Championship:
  - Bronze Medalist: 2010
- Junior European Championship:
  - Silver Medalist: 2011
- World Championship:
  - Gold Medalist: 2019
  - Silver Medalist: 2015
  - Bronze Medalist: 2017
- European Championship:
  - Silver Medalist: 2016
  - Bronze Medalist: 2018

== Individual awards ==
- All-Star team Best Goalkeeper of the World Championship: 2015, 2019

== Personal life ==
She is married to Dutch footballer Mart Lieder. In May 2022 it was announced that she is expecting her first child. She gave birth to a girl, Flo on 18 November 2022.
