= Viachaslau Saldatsenka =

Belarusian handball player

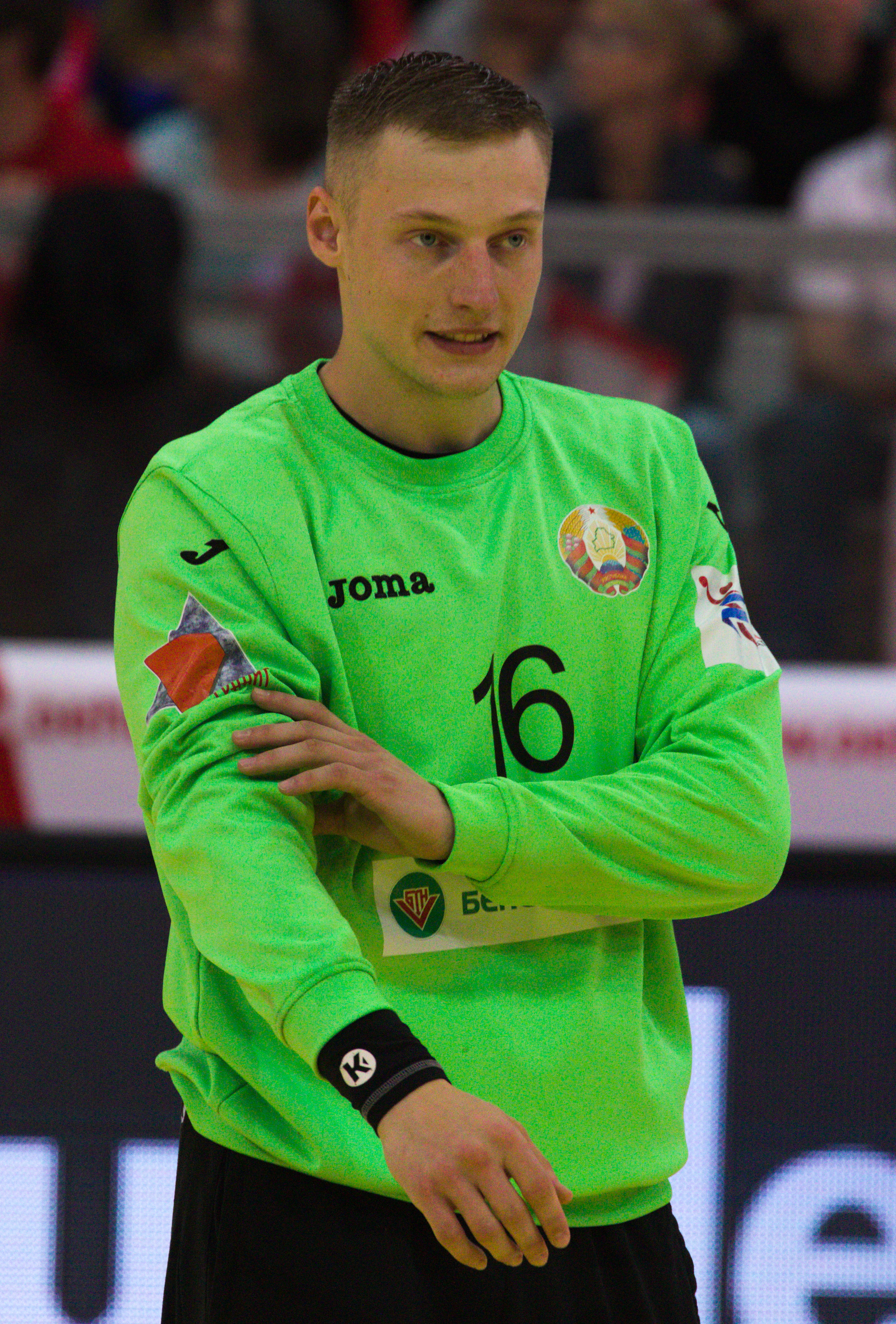

Personal information
- Nationality: Belarusian
- Born: 23 July 1994 (age 32) Orsha, Belarus
- Height: 1.89 m (6 ft 2 in)

Sport
- Sport: Handball
- Position: Goalkeeper
- Current club: SKA Minsk
- Number: 16

Senior clubs
- Years: Team
- 2012–2017: SKA Minsk
- 2017: HBW Balingen-Weilstetten
- 2017–2018: HC Odorheiu Secuiesc
- 2018: SKA Minsk
- 2018–2019: HC Dobrogea Sud
- 2019–2021: CSM Bacău
- 2021–2022: HC Meshkov Brest
- 2022–2025: GC Amicitia Zürich
- 2025–2026: RK Vojvodina
- 2026–present: SKA Minsk
National team
Years	Team	Apps	(Gls)
2013–	Belarus	73	(1)

Viachaslau Saldatsenka (born 23 July 1994) is a Belarusian handball player for SKA Minsk. He also represents the Belarusian national team.

He competed at the 2016 European Men's Handball Championship.
