= HV E&O =

Dutch handball club

- Full name: Handbalvereniging Emmen & Omstreken
- Short name: E&O
- Founded: October 18, 1933; 92 years ago
- Arena: Oosting Arena ׂ
- Capacity: 2,500
- Head coach: Jan Gerald Mulder (men's team)
- League: Eresdivisie (men's team); Second division (women's team)
- Club colours
| Home | Away |

Handbalvereniging Emmen & Omstreken, normally called HV E&O or just E&O is a dutch handball club from Emmen, Netherlands. The men's team plays in the Eresdivisie.

The club was founded on 18 October 1933, and have won the Dutch Men's Championship 6 times.

== Titles ==
=== Men's team ===
- Dutch Championship (5): 1989, 1991, 1992, 1996, 1998
- Dutch Cup (6): 1988, 1992, 1996, 1999, 2002, 2003
- Dutch Supercup (2): 1991, 2002

=== Women's team ===
- Second division (2): 1995, 2003

== Notable former players ==
- (Netherlands) Lois Abbingh (2006-2010)
- (Netherlands) Merel Freriks (2010-2017)
- (Netherlands) Esther Schop (2010-2011)
- (Netherlands) Tess Wester (2010-2011)
- (Iceland) Þórey Rósa Stefánsdóttir (2009-2011)
- (Netherlands) Anouk Nieuwenweg (-2015)

== List of coaches ==
=== Men's team ===
- 1978–1981: (Netherlands) George van Noesel
- 1981–1992: (Netherlands) Harry Weerman
- 1992: (Netherlands) John Ettekoven
- 1992: (Netherlands) Jan Osinga (a.i.)
- 1993: (Czech Republic) Ján Kecskeméthy
- 1993–1996: (Netherlands) Henk Groener
- 1996–1997: (Poland) Ryszard Malag
- 1997–1998: (Netherlands) Joop Fiege
- 1998–2003: (Netherlands) Peter Portengen
- 2003–2004: (Netherlands) Joop Fiege
- 2004–2005: (Netherlands) Harry Weerman
- 2005–2008: (Netherlands) Paul van Gestel
- 2008–2010: (Netherlands) Peter Portengen
- 2010–2012: (Netherlands) Arthur Langedijk
- 2012–2013: (Netherlands) Joop Fiege
- 2013–2014: (Netherlands) Erik Huizing & (Netherlands) Jan Gerald Mulder
- 2014–2017: (Netherlands) Edwin Kippers
- 2017–2018: (Netherlands) Joop Fiege
- 2018–2020: (Netherlands) Freek Gielen
- 2020–2021: (Netherlands) Annelies Smeets
- 2021–2022: (Denmark) Henrik Bergholt
- 2022–2023: (Netherlands) Harry Weerman
- 2023–2024: (Netherlands) Martin de Hoop
- 2024–: (Netherlands) Jan Gerald Mulder

=== Women's team ===
- 1992–1997: (Netherlands) Harry Weerman
- 1997–2007: Unknown
- 2007–2010: (Netherlands) Joop Fiege
- 2010–2011: Unknown
- –2011: (Netherlands) Henk Jan Ottens
- 2011–2013: (Netherlands) Diana Woudstra
- 2013–2014: (Netherlands) Edwin Kippers
- 2014–2015: (Netherlands) Harry Weerman & (Netherlands) Saskia Lamberts
- 2015–2017: (Netherlands) Mike van Rooden
- 2017–2018: (Netherlands) Frank van der Zanden & (Netherlands) Vincent Mooi
- 2018–2020: (Netherlands) Henk Smeenge
- 2020–2021: (Netherlands) Mart Aalderink
- 2021–2022: (Netherlands) Jan Gerald Mulder
- 2022–2023: (Denmark) Henrik Bergholt
- 2023–: (Netherlands) Jan Gerald Mulder
