= Kay Smits =

Dutch handball player (born 1997)

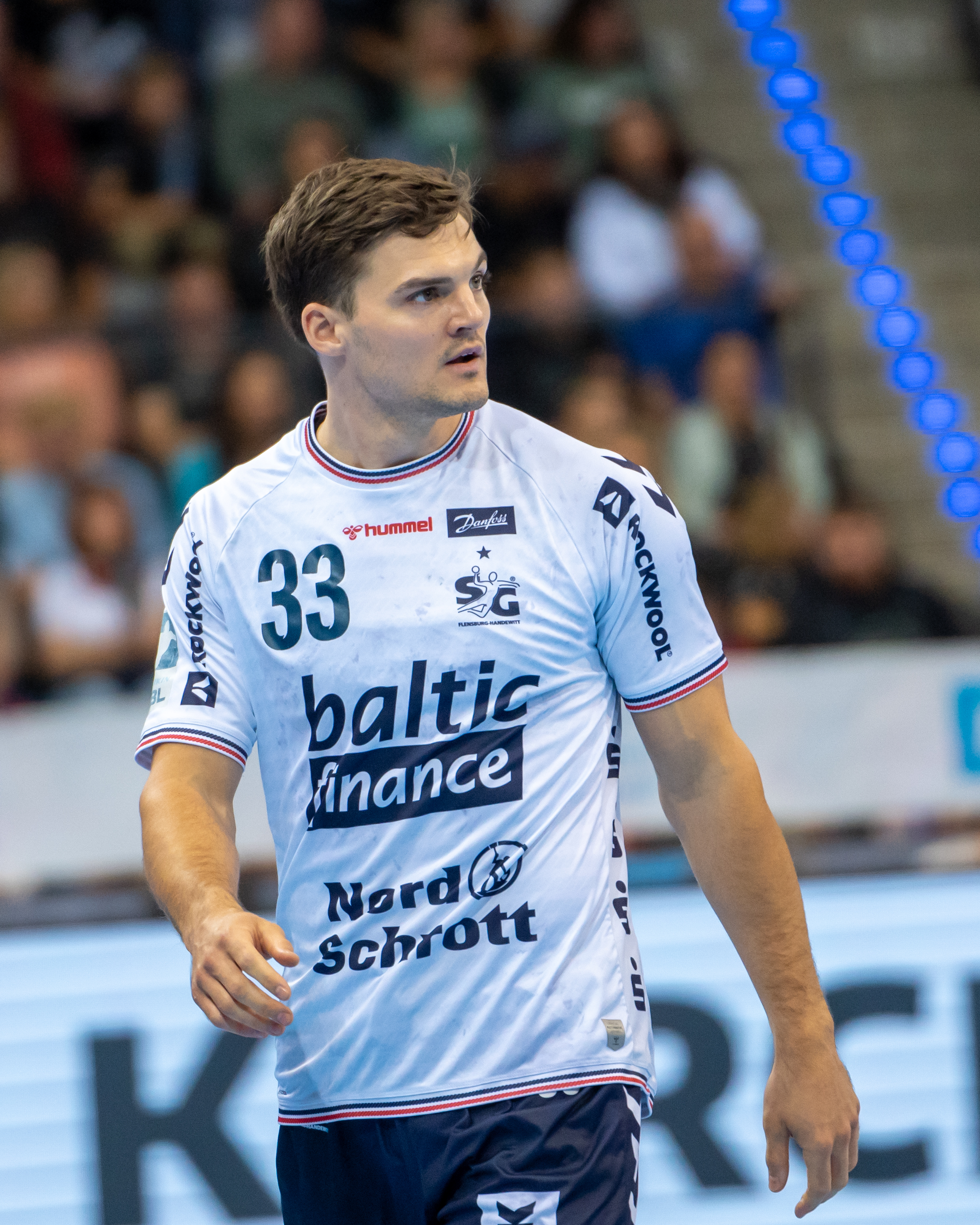

Personal information
- Full name: Kay Kirsten Evert Smits
- Nationality: Dutch
- Born: 31 March 1997 (age 29) Geleen, Netherlands
- Height: 1.86 m (6 ft 1 in)

Sport
- Sport: Handball
- Position: Right back
- Current club: SG Flensburg-Handewitt
- Number: 33

Senior clubs
- Years: Team
- 2014–2016: Limburg Lions
- 2016–2018: Wilhelmshavener HV
- 2018–2021: TTH Holstebro
- 2020: → SC Magdeburg (loan)
- 2021–2023: SC Magdeburg
- 2023–: SG Flensburg-Handewitt
National team
Years	Team	Apps	(Gls)
2016–	Netherlands	80	(368)

Kay Kirsten Evert Smits (born 31 March 1997) is a Dutch handball player for SG Flensburg-Handewitt and the Dutch national team.

He is the first ever men's player of the Netherlands to win the EHF Champions League, Europe's most important club competition with SC Magdeburg in 2022/2023.

He represented the Netherlands at the 2022 and 2020 European Men's Handball Championship and the 2023 World Men's Handball Championship. Smits had to withdraw for the 2024 EHF Euro's due to inflammation of his heart muscle.

He missed the 2026 European Men's Handball Championship due to heart complications.

Although Kay Smits is still an active player, he is already considered as the best Dutch right back ever. His father Gino Smits, sister Inger and brother Jorn are also international handball players for the Netherlands.

== Honours ==
- EHF Champions League:
  - Gold: 2023
- Handball-Bundesliga:
  - Gold: 2022
- DHB-Pokal:
  - Silver: 2022, 2023
- EHF European League:
  - Silver: 2022
- IHF Super Globe:
  - Gold: 2021, 2022
- Dutch Championship:
  - Gold: 2015, 2016
- Dutch Handball Cup:
  - Gold: 2015, 2016
- BENE-League:
  - Gold: 2015
