= Gerrie Eijlers =

Dutch handball player (born 1980)

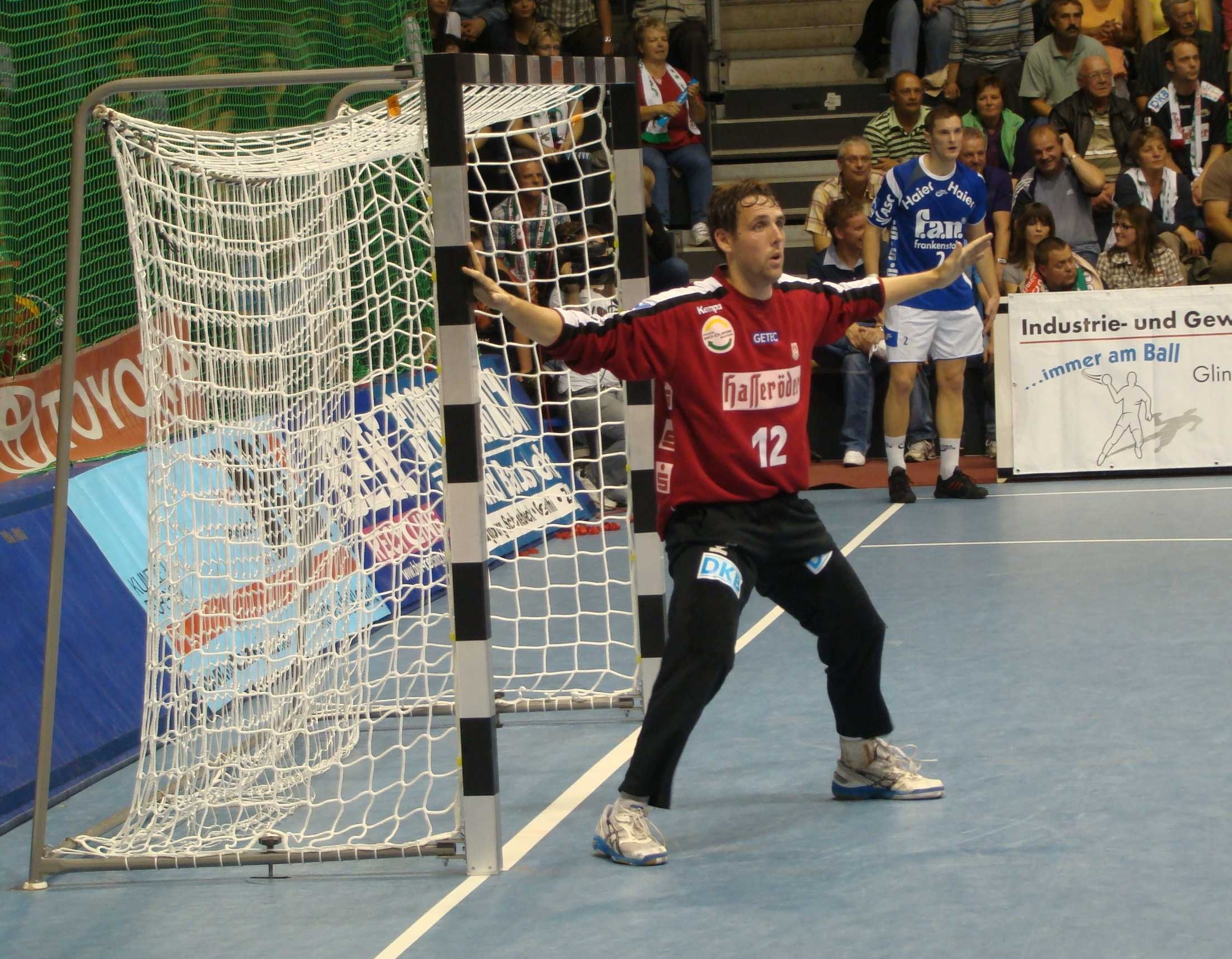

Personal information
- Nationality: Dutch
- Born: 9 May 1980 (age 46) Amsterdam, Netherlands
- Height: 1.93 m (6 ft 4 in)

Sport
- Sport: Handball
- Position: Goalkeeper

Senior clubs
- Years: Team
- 1986-2003: HV KRAS/Volendam
- 2003-2006: SG Solingen
- 2006-2008: TUSEM Essen
- 2008-2009: HBW Balingen-Weilstetten
- 2009-2014: SC Magdeburg
- 2014-2017: GWD Minden
- 2017-2020: HV KRAS/Volendam
National team
Years	Team	Apps	(Gls)
1998-2022	Netherlands	121	(4)

Gerrie Eijlers (born 9 May 1980) is a Dutch retired handball player and handball coach. He retired in 2020.

He represented the Netherlands at the 2020 European Men's Handball Championship.

After his playing career he has been a goalkeeping coach at the Dutch national team. At the 2022 European Men's Handball Championship he decided to shortly unretire to fill in as a backup goalkeeper for the Dutch national team when Dennis Schellekens tested positive for COVID-19. He did however test positive himself later, and did thus not get to play.
