= Matthias Rex Dorgelo =

Dutch-Danish handball player (born 2002)

Matthias Rex
Personal information
- Full name: Matthias René Rex Dorgelo
- Nationality: Dutch/Danish
- Born: 31 October 2002 (age 23) Odense, Denmark
- Height: 2.00 m (6 ft 7 in)

Sport
- Sport: Handball
- Position: Goalkeeper
- Current club: SønderjyskE Håndbold
- Number: 1

Senior clubs
- Years: Team
- 2019–2024: GOG Håndbold
- 2024–: SønderjyskE Håndbold
National team
Years	Team	Apps	(Gls)
2024–	Netherlands	9	(1)

Matthias René Rex Dorgelo (born 31 October 2002) is a Dutch-Danish handball player who plays for SønderjyskE Håndbold and the Dutch national team. He represented Denmark at the U21-level.

He started his career at GOG Håndbold, where he signed a professional contract at the age of 19. Here he was the second choice goalkeeper behind Tobias Thulin. He won both the Danish championship and Danish Cup with the club. In 2024 he joined league rivals SønderjyskE Håndbold in order to become the first choice goalkeeper.

In 2025 he represented the Netherlands at the 2025 World Championship in Denmark, Norway and Croatia.

== Private life ==
Rex was born in Denmark, but grew up in Norway, where he lived for 17 years. He moved back to Denmark to pursue a handball career.
