= Neerbeek =

Neerbeek Nirbik
- Village
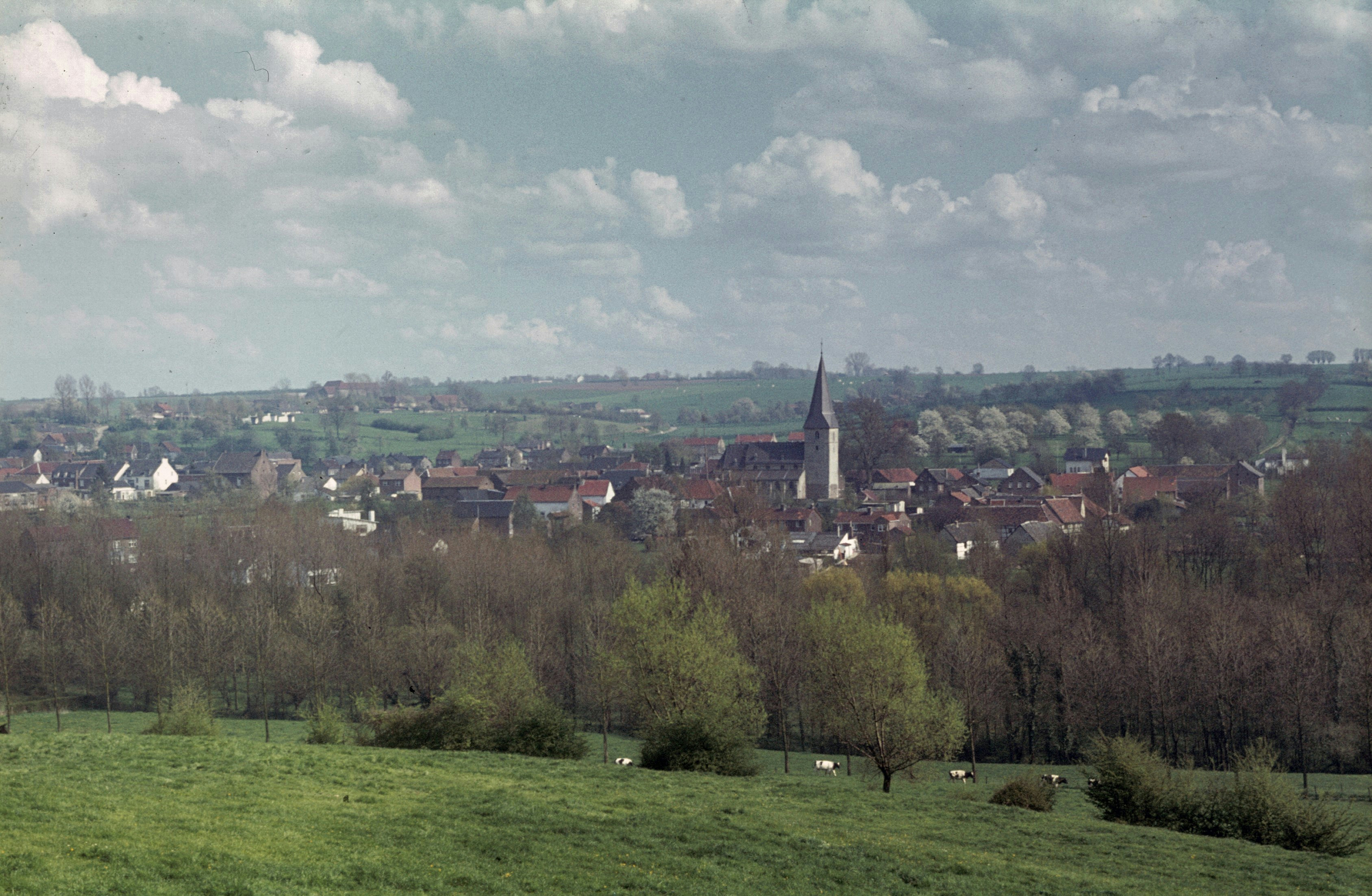
- View on Neerbeek

- Location in the Netherlands Location in the province of Limburg in the Netherlands
- Coordinates: 50°57′2″N 5°48′55″E
- Country: Netherlands
- Province: Limburg
- Municipality: Beek

Area
  - Total: 1.23 km^{2} (0.47 sq mi)
- Elevation: 84 m (276 ft)

Population (2021)
  - Total: 2,370
  - Density: 1,930/km^{2} (4,990/sq mi)
- Time zone: UTC+1 (CET)
  - Summer (DST): UTC+2 (CEST)
- Postal code: 6191
- Dialing code: 046

Neerbeek is a village in the Dutch province of Limburg. It is located in the municipality of Beek. The village has a population of around 2,400 people. The village used to split between the Dutch Republic and the Spanish Netherlands.

== History ==
The village was first mentioned in 1225 as Nederbeke, and means "lower lying brook". Neder (lower) has been added to distinguish from Beek, and the brook refers to the Keutelbeek.

Neerbeek is a village which developed in the Middle Ages along the Keutelbeek. In 1505, the hamlet was burnt down by the troops of the Duchy of Guelders. In 1661, Neerbeek was split in a part belonging to Beek, Dutch Republic and a part belonging to Geleen, Spanish Netherlands. The parts were often referred to a Dutch Neerbeek and Spanish Neerbeek.

Neerbeek was home to 516 people in 1840. It started to developed after the Staatsmijn Maurits, a coal mine, was opened in Geleen in 1925. The Catholic St Callistus Church is a single aisled church which was built between 1932 and 1933. In 1965, the former Spanish Neerbeek was annexed by Geleen and became a neighbourhood. Many of the houses were torn down to create Geleen-Zuid.

== Facilities ==
The Prins Mauritslaan - Rijksweg-Zuid is the main connection between Geleen and Neerbeek. Due to its geographical location, Neerbeek makes more use of the facilities at Geleen than those at Beek.

There are several cafes and restaurants located in Neerbeek. Furthermore, there is a primary school.

In 1957, a handball club was founded in Neerbeek, called Blauw-Wit. The club had a rich history, it won three times the national championship, twice the national cup and once the Super Cup. In 1998, Blauw-Wit merged with HV Caesar from Beek to become Beekse Fusie Club.

There also is an amateur football club called RKVV Neerbeek, which was founded in 1978.

== Gallery ==
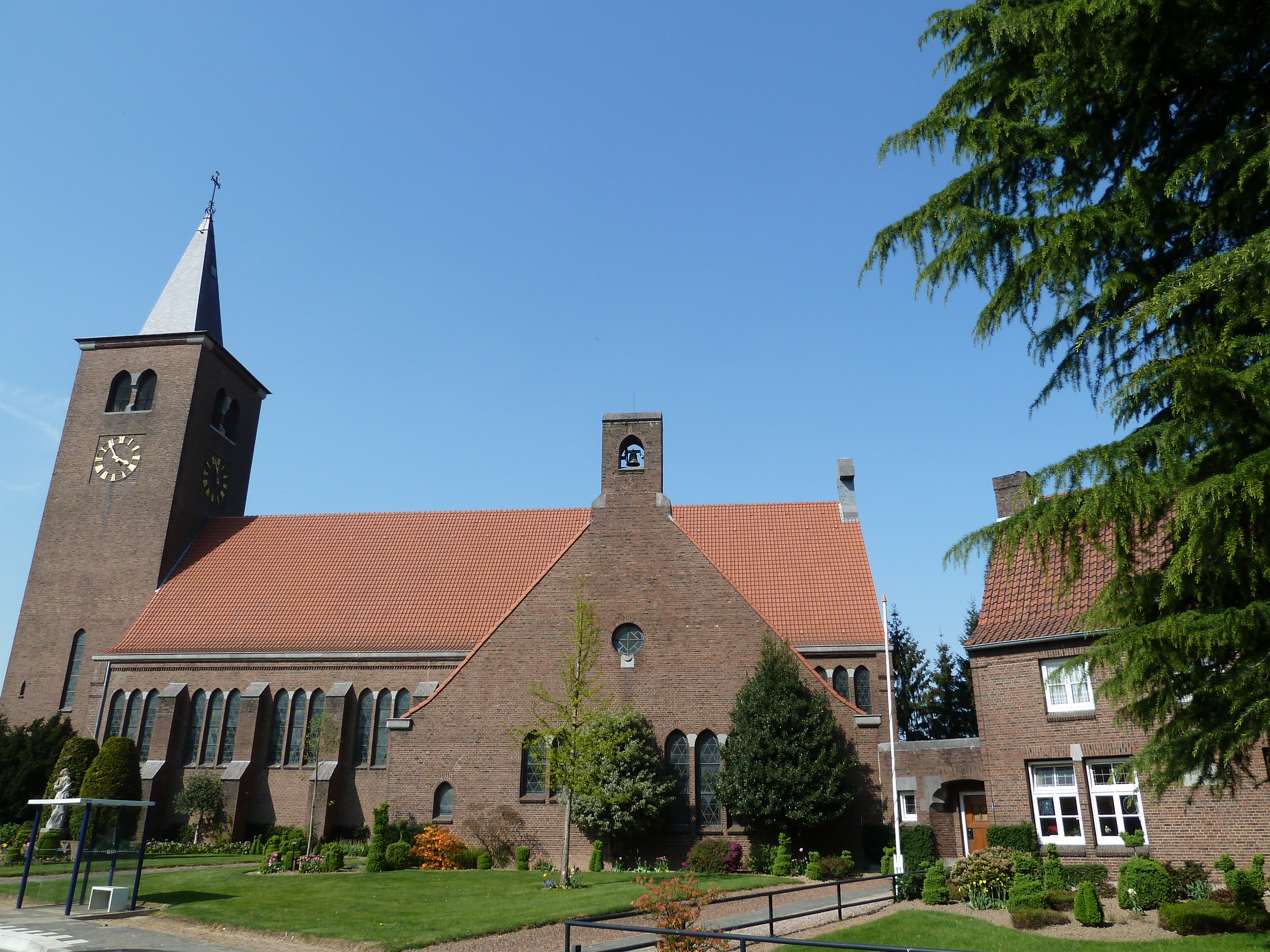
St Callistus Church

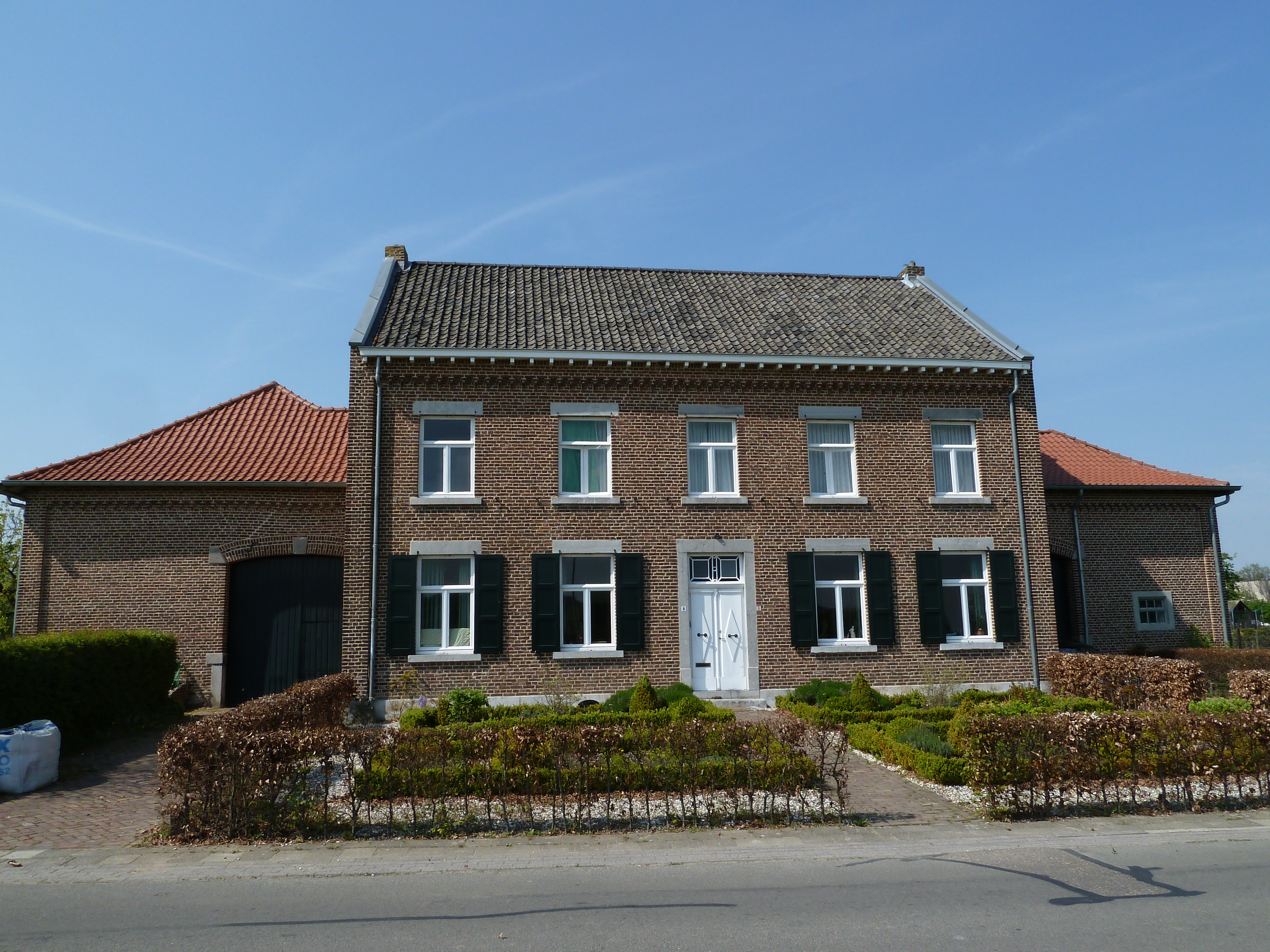
Farm in Neerbeek

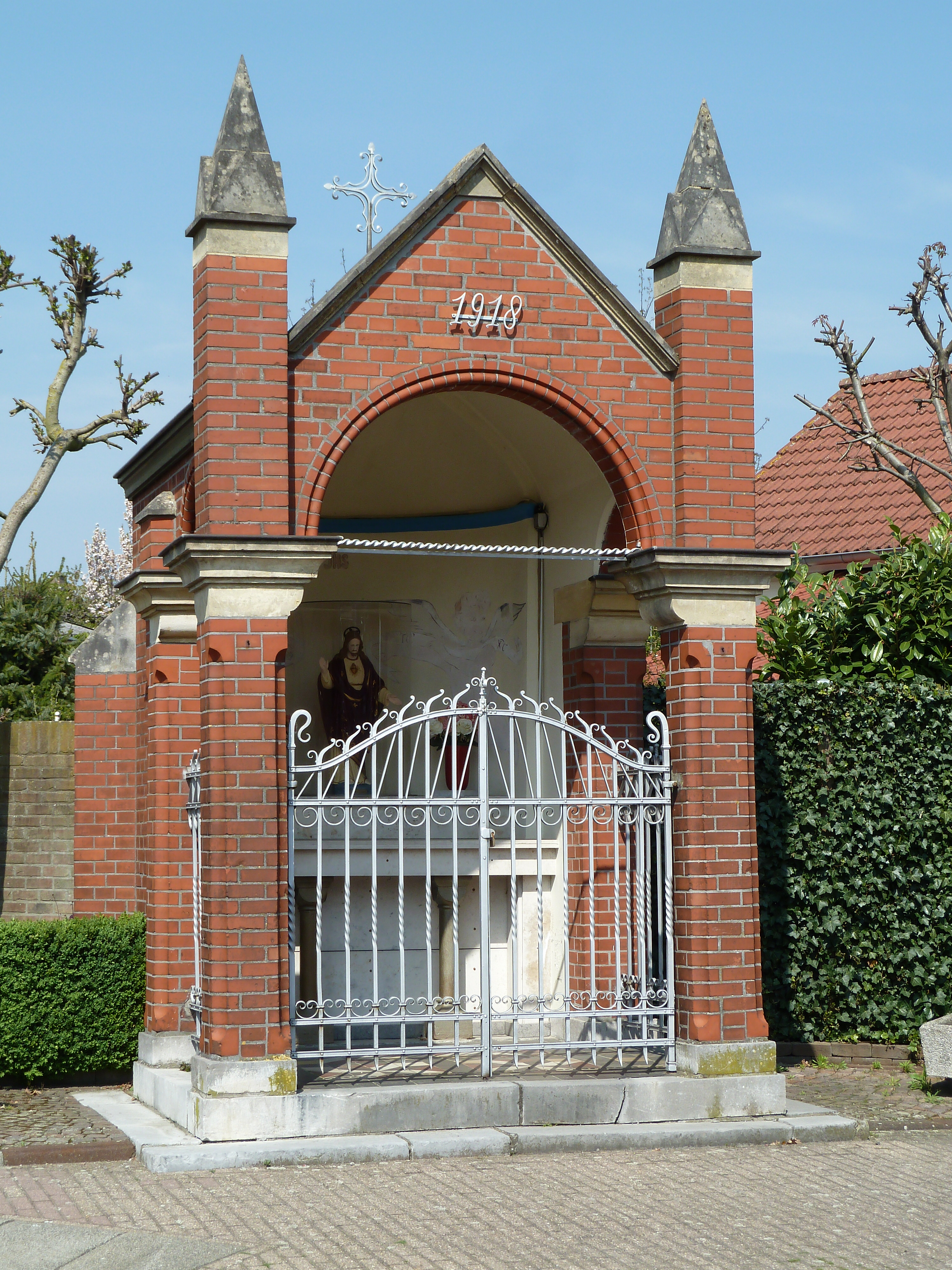
Chapel in Neerbeek

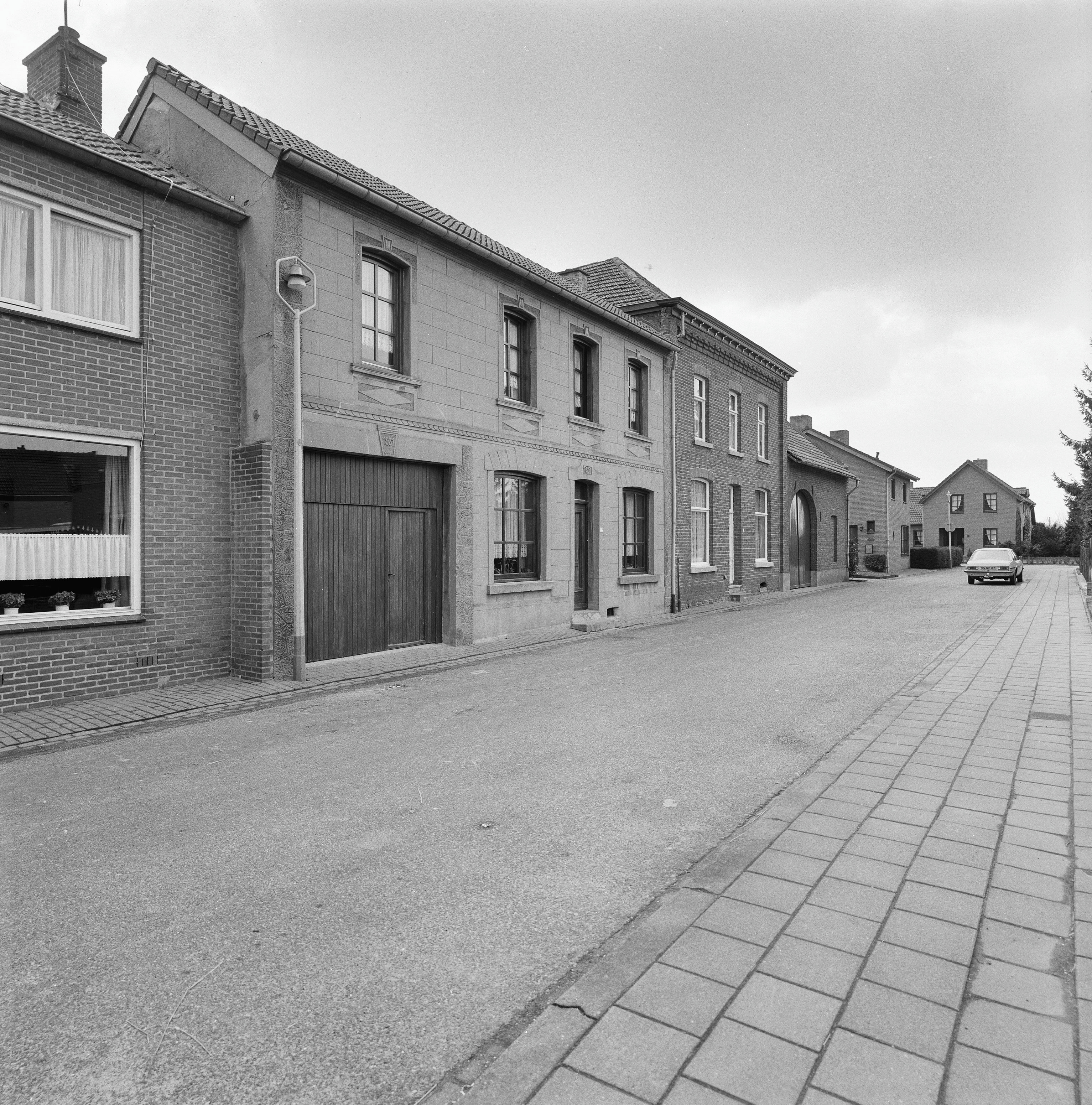
Street in Neerbeek (1992)
