= Henk Groener =

Dutch handball coach (born 1960)

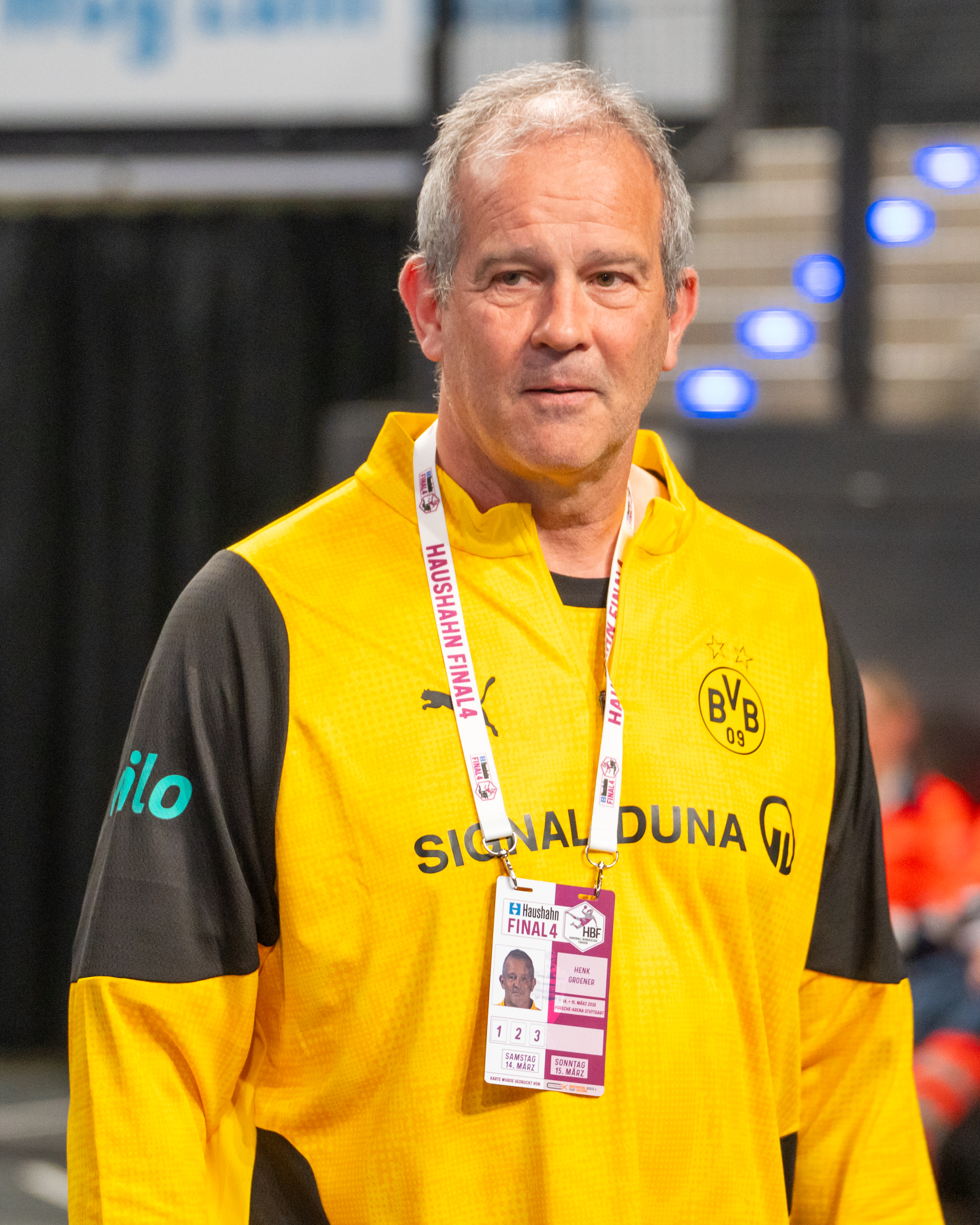
- Groener in 2026

Personal information
- Full name: Hendrikus Franciscus Groener
- Nationality: Dutch
- Born: 29 September 1960 (age 66) Leersum, Netherlands

Sport
- Sport: Handball
- Position: Right back

Senior clubs
- Years: Team
- 1980–1987: Swift Arnhem
- 1987–1989: TV Emsdetten
- 1989–1990: Wacker Thun
- 1990–1991: TV Aldekerk
- 1991–1993: Swift Arnhem
National team
Years	Team	Apps	(Gls)
1983–1993	Netherlands	208	(519)

Teams managed
- 1993–1996: HV E&O
- 1996–2002: TV Emsdetten
- 2002–2005: Netherlands
- 2006–2007: SG HBR Ludwigsburg
- 2009–2016: Netherlands (women)
- 2018–2022: Germany (women)
- 2022–: Borussia Dortmund
Medal record
Coach for women's handball
Representing Netherlands
World Championship
Silver medal – second place	2015 Denmark

Hendrikus Franciscus Groener, commonly known as Henk Groener (born 29 September 1960) is a Dutch handball coach, and former handball player. He is the current head coach of Borussia Dortmund Handball, since November 2022.

== Career ==
He played 208 games with the Dutch national team, scoring 519 goals.

From 2002 to 2006 he coached the Dutch national men's team, and since 2009 he has coached the Dutch women's team. With this team he qualified for the 2011, 2013 and 2015 World Women's Handball Championships. The Dutch team also qualified for the 2016 Olympic Games where they finished 4th. After this tournament, Groener left the team.

On 1 January 2018 he took over the German women's national team.

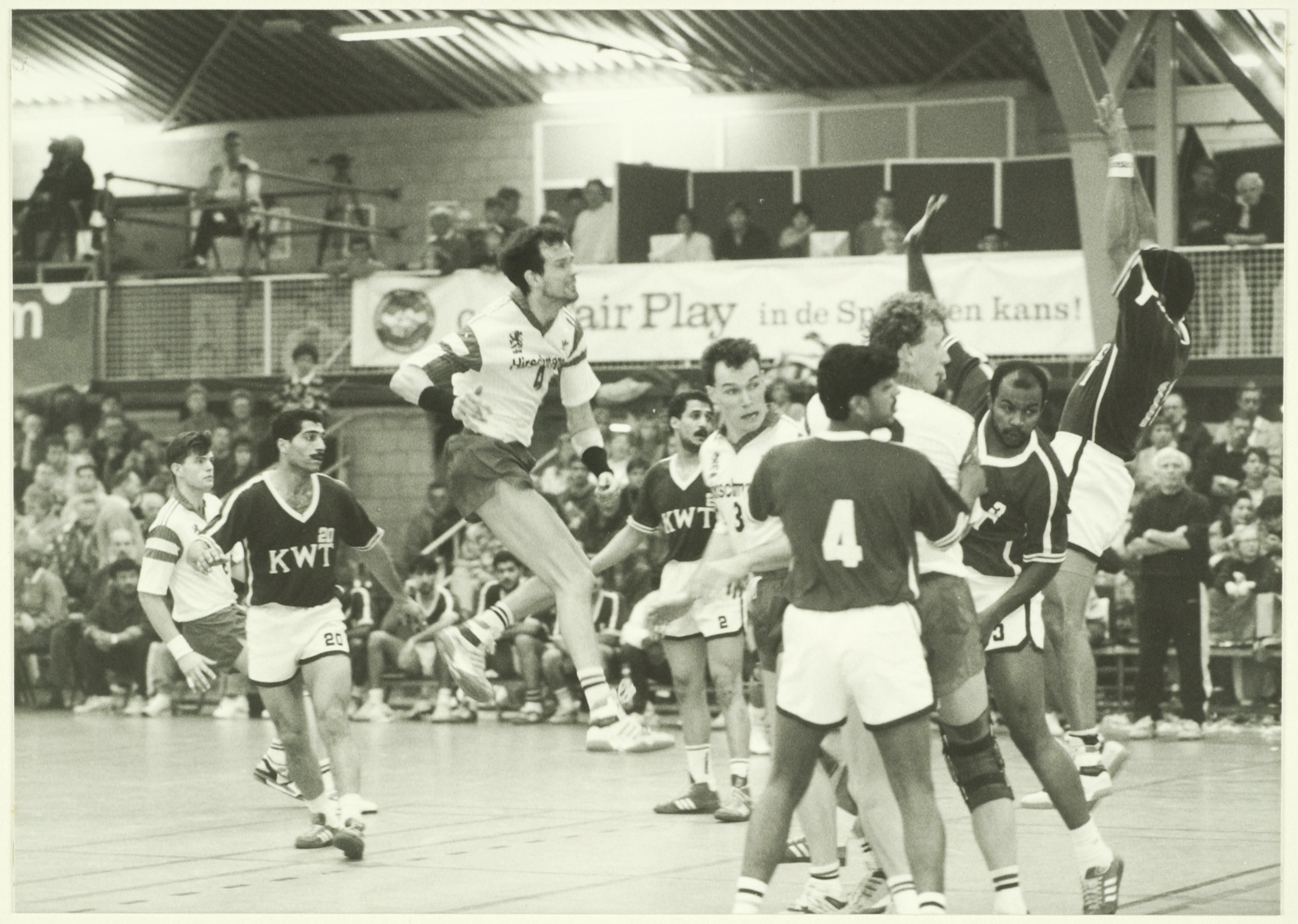
Groener after a shoot with Netherlands against Kuwait, in 1991.
