= Lambert Schuurs =

Dutch handball player and runner (born 1962)

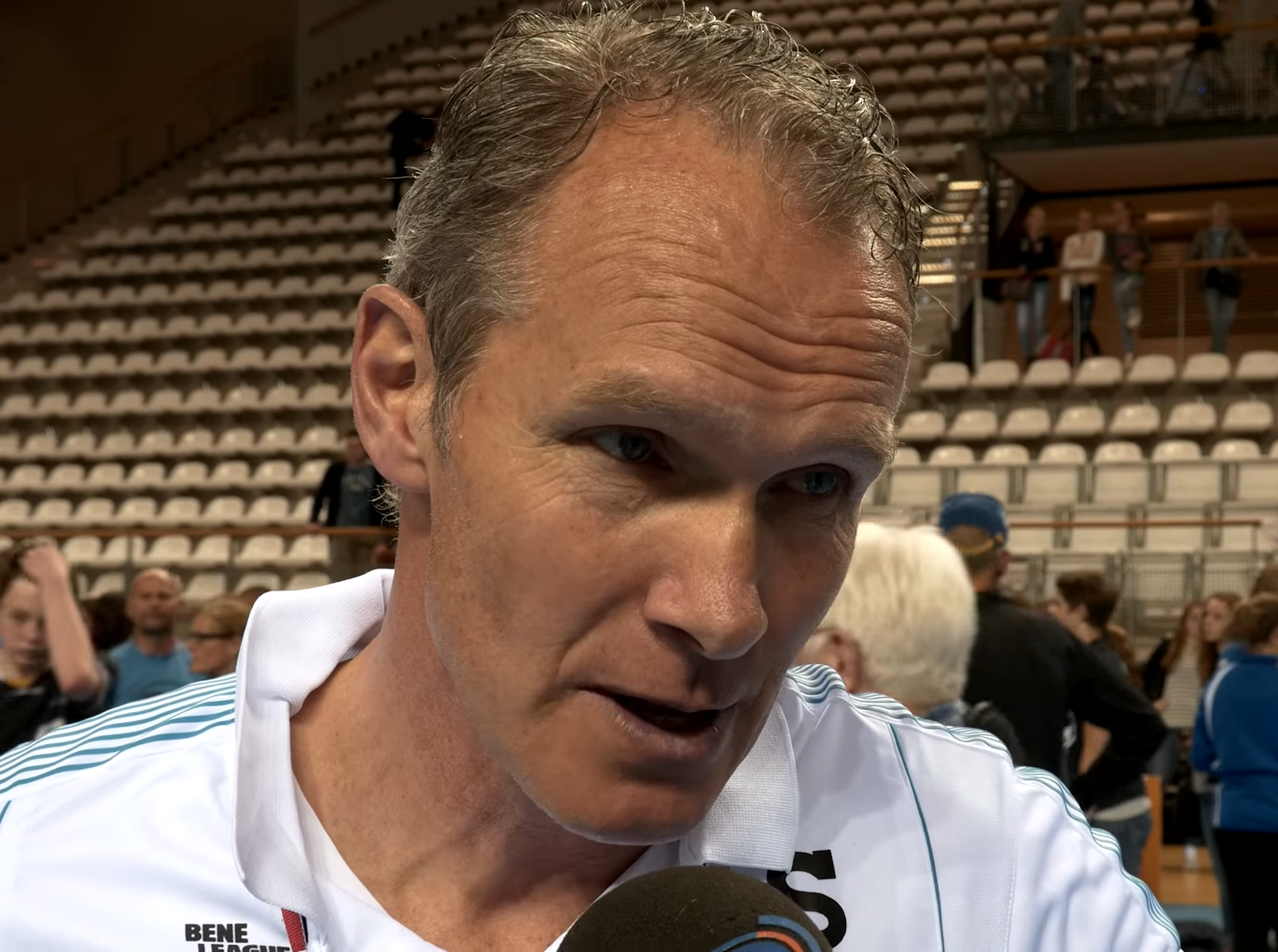
- Schuurs in 2015

Personal information
- Nationality: Dutch
- Born: 15 October 1962 (age 64) Sittard, Netherlands
- Height: 1.92 m (6 ft 4 in)

Sport
- Sport: Handball
- Position: Pivot
- Current club: Limburg Lions (assistant manager)

Youth career
- Years: Team
- –: Sittardia

Senior clubs
- Years: Team
- 1978–2000: Sittardia
- 2001: Neerpelt
- 2001–2006: BFC
- 2006–2007: Sittardia
- 2008–2009: Limburg Lions
National team
Years	Team	Apps
1981–2001	Netherlands	312

Lambert Schuurs (born 15 October 1962) is a Dutch retired handball player and ultra-long distance runner. He is the Netherlands' record international player with 312 caps.

== Career ==
=== Handball ===
Schuurs made his debut for the senior team of hometown handball club Sittardia in 1978 and played the majority of his career for them. After being demoted to the reserves team in 2000, he moved abroad to play for Neerpelt in Belgium and joined BFC a few months later.

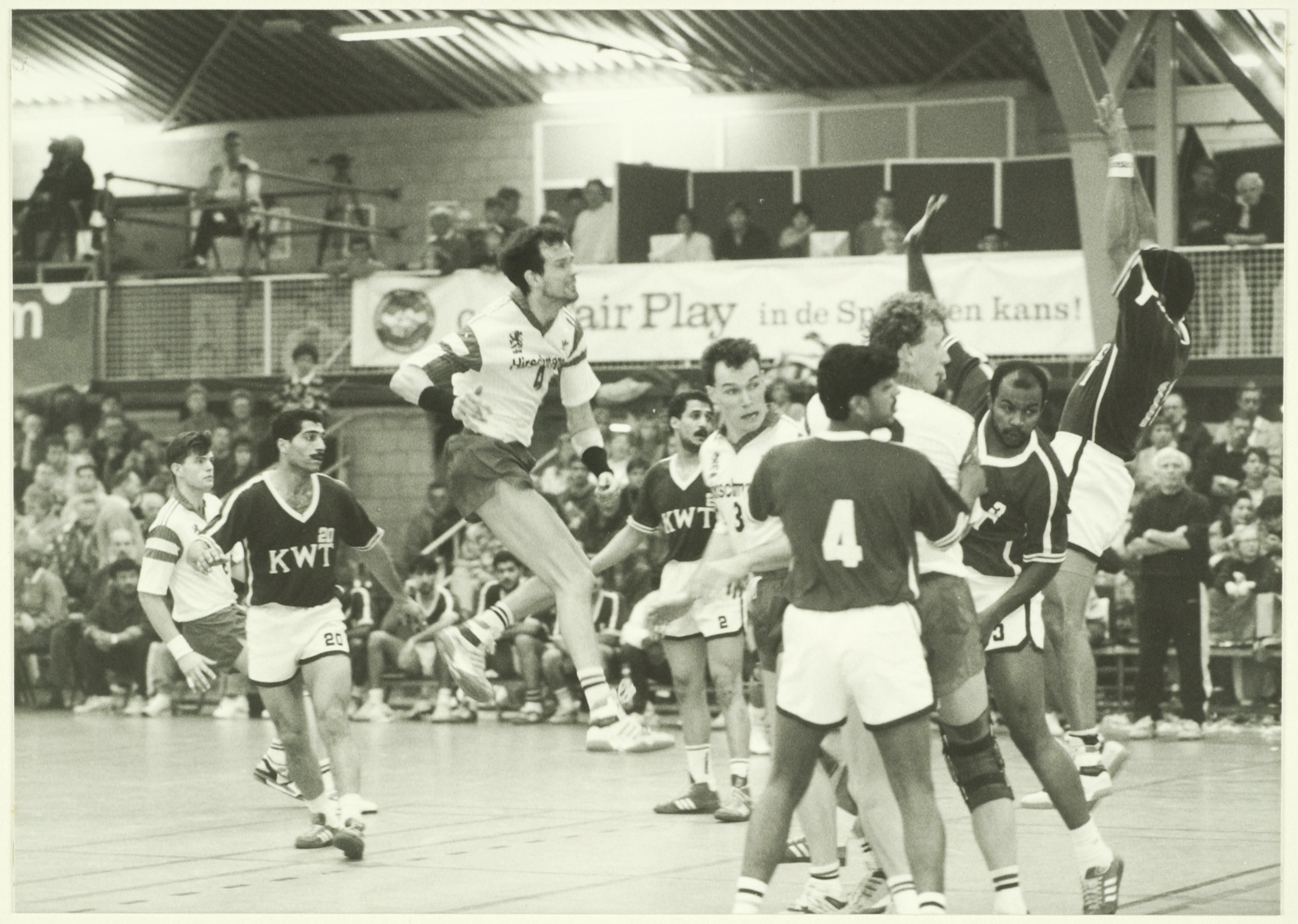
Groener after a shoot with Netherlands against Kuwait, in 1991. Schuurs stands close to the goal perimeter

He later became player/manager at Limburg Lions.

=== Running ===
In 2001, Schuurs finished 5th and best Dutch runner in the 50 kilometer Dead Sea Ultramarathon. He also became third in the Himalaya Run and finished earlier than renowned marathon runner Gerard Nijboer in the Jungfrau Marathon.

== Personal life ==
Schuurs is married to Monique and they live in Nieuwstadt and have three children. His daughter Demi is a professional tennis player and his son Perr is a professional football player.
