= Beekse Fusie Club =

Dutch handball club

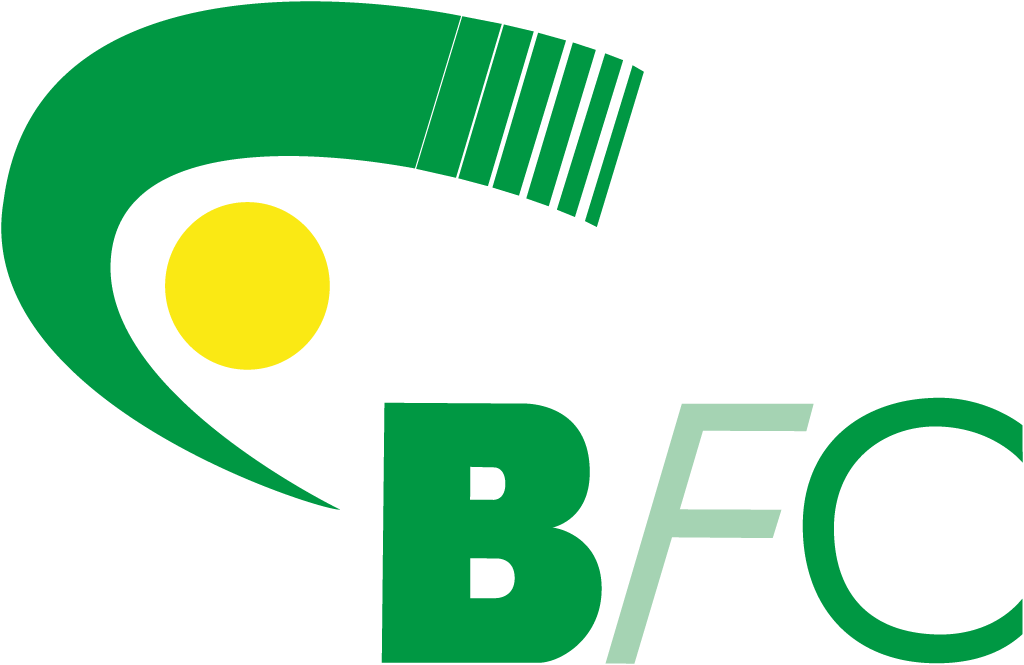
- Full name: Beekse Fusie Club
- Short name: BFC
- Founded: 1 July 1998
- Arena: De Haamen
- Capacity: 850
- Head coach: Men: Richard Curfs; Woman: Irina Pusic
- League: Men: Eredivisie; Woman: Eerste divisie
- Club colours
Home	Away

BFC is a handball club from Beek, Limburg. The club was founded in 1998 by a merger of HV Blauw-Wit from Neerbeek and HV Caesar from Beek.

Since its foundation in 1998, neither the men's nor the woman's team won the championship or the national cup. The women's team was able to reach the finals of the national cup in 2006 but lost to Quintus. Because the team reached the finals of the national cup, they were allowed to enter the EHF Cup Winners' Cup, but were knocked out of the tournament after the first round.

In 2008, BFC co-operated with V&L and HV Sittardia to form a stronger men's team. The project was called Tophandbal Zuid-Limburg and two new teams were formed: Limburg Lions and Limburg Wild Dogs (later turned into the second team of Limburg Lions). In 2016, the management of BFC decided to take no longer part in the collaboration.

In the 2023-24 season the club won the Eredivisie for the first time in club history.

== Accomplishments ==
=== Women ===
- Dutch Handball Cup:
  - Runner-Up (1) : 2006

=== Men ===
- Eredivisie
  - Winner (1) : 2023-24

== European record ==
Season	Competition	Round	Club	1st leg	2nd leg	Aggregate
2006-07	EHF Cup Winners' Cup	R2	(Spain) BM Bera Bera	42-17	32-16	74-33

== Former players ==
- Lambert Schuurs (2001-2006)
- Iso Sluijters (2007-2008)
- Larissa Nüsser (until 2014)
