= Beek =

Beek Baek
- Municipality
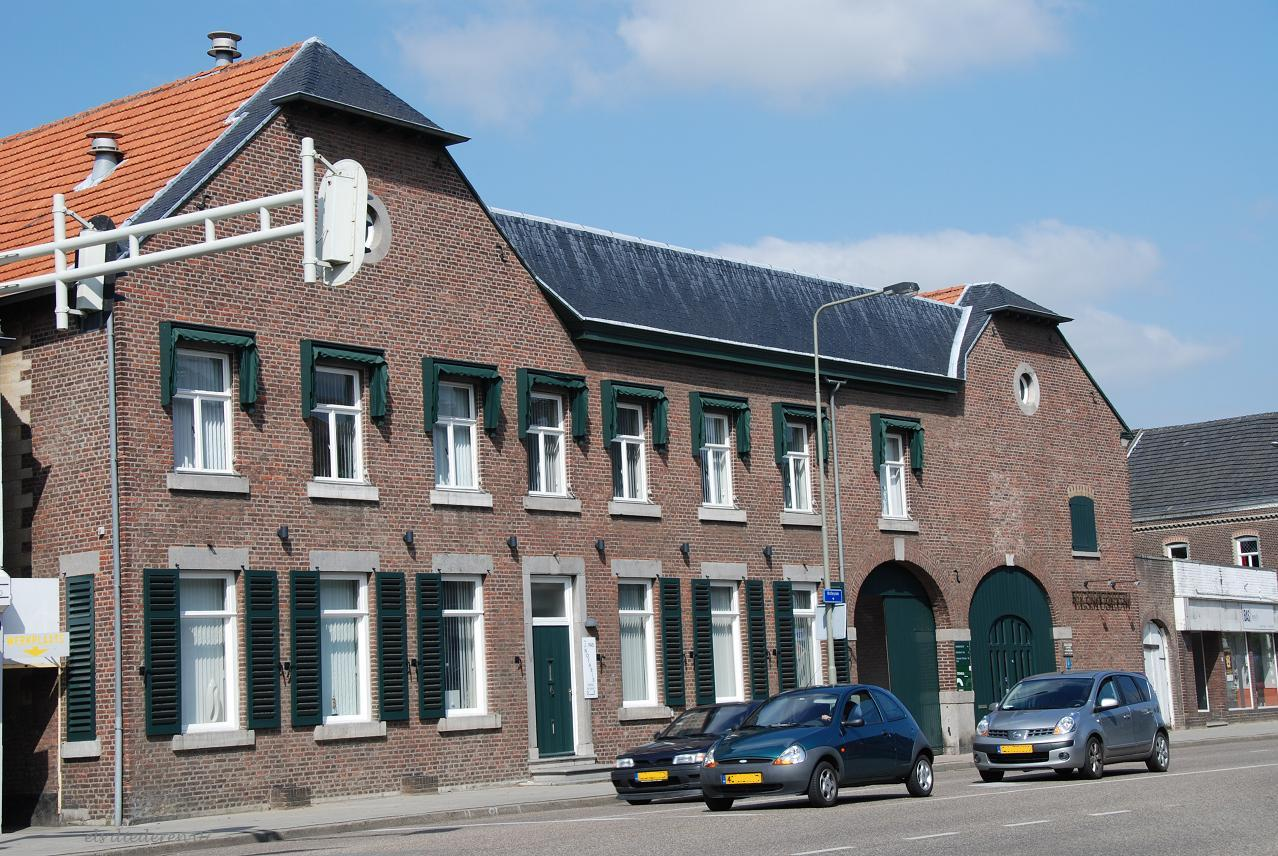
- Elsmuseum in Beek

- Flag Coat of arms

- Location in Limburg
- Coordinates: 50°56′N 5°48′E
- Country: Netherlands
- Province: Limburg

Government
  - Body: Municipal council
  - Mayor: Christine van Basten-Bodin (D66)

Area
  - Total: 21.03 km^{2} (8.12 sq mi)
  - Land: 21.03 km^{2} (8.12 sq mi)
  - Water: 0.00 km^{2} (0 sq mi)
- Elevation: 81 m (266 ft)

Population (January 2021)
  - Total: 15,875
  - Density: 755/km^{2} (1,960/sq mi)
- Demonym: Bekenaar
- Time zone: UTC+1 (CET)
  - Summer (DST): UTC+2 (CEST)
- Postcode: 6176, 6190–6199
- Area code: 046
- Website: www.gemeentebeek.nl

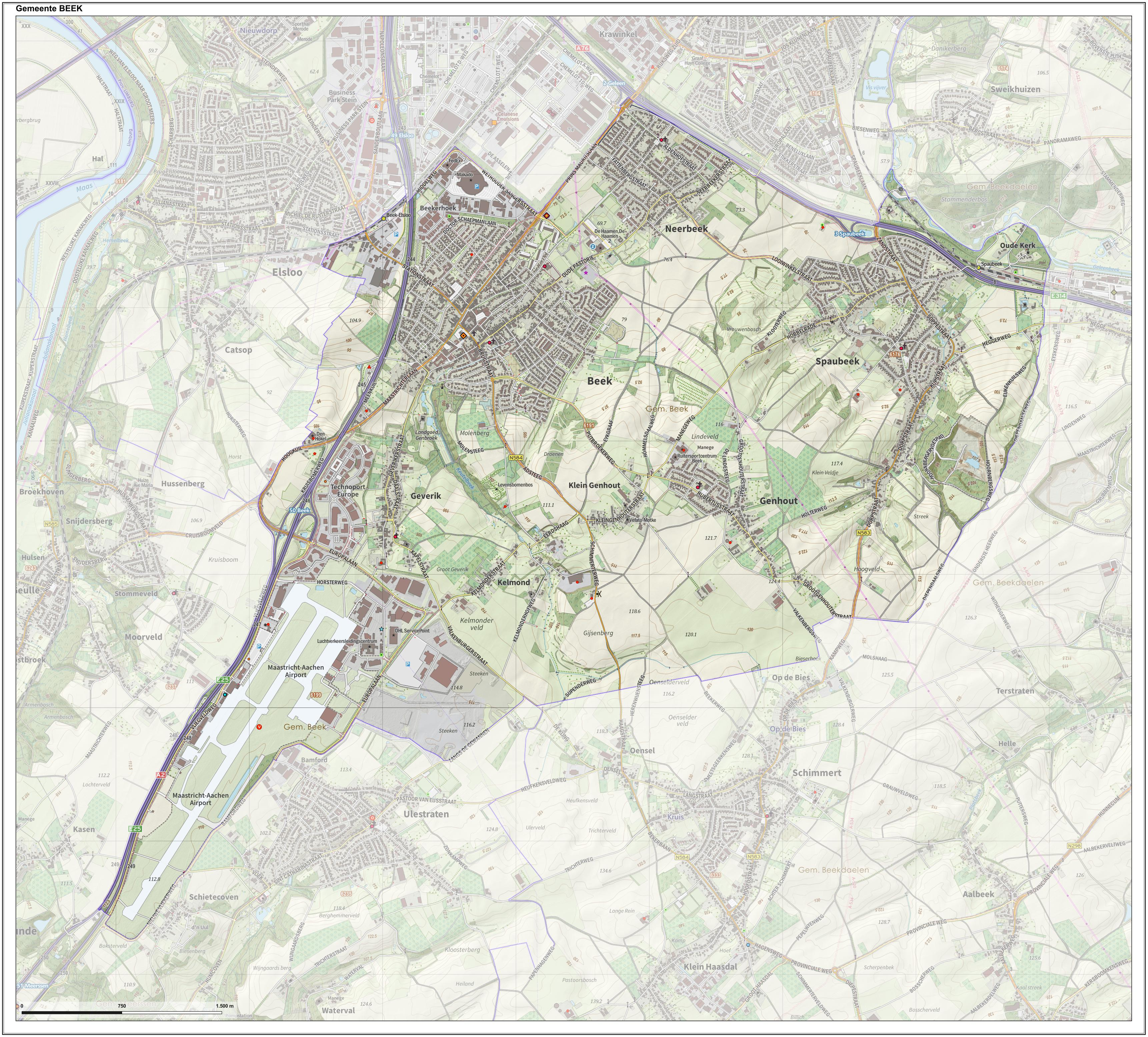
Topographic map of Beek, June 2015

Beek (Dutch: [ˈbeːk]; Limburgish: Baek [ˈbɛːk]) is a town and municipality in the southeastern Netherlands, in the province of Limburg. As of 2012, Beek has a population of about 16,400, of which about 8,800 live in the town of Beek.

The municipality of Beek makes part of the region of South Limburg and lies between the city of Geleen in the north and Maastricht in the south, and lies furthermore southeast of interchange Kerensheide and the chemical industries of Chemelot. It has a slightly hilly landscape with altitudes differing between 70 and 120 metres (230 and 390 ft) above sea level, and has two small forests: Kelmonderbos between Beek and Kelmond, and Spaubekerbos near Spaubeek. The Keutelbeek flows through and has its source in the municipality of Beek.

== Population centres ==
Settlements in the municipality of Beek (population within brackets on 1 January 2005).

Town:

- Beek (8,770)

| Villages: Genhout (1,320); Groot Genhout; Klein Genhout; Geverik (430); Neerbeek (2,580); Spaubeek (3,720) | Hamlets: Hobbelrade; Hoeve; Kelmond (170); Looiwinkel; Maastricht Aachen Airport (business park); Oude Kerk |

== History ==
In 1982, Spaubeek merged with Beek and the municipality got his current size. In 2005, an archaeological site was found between Beek and Neerbeek, consisting of the remainings of a settlement from 5,000 BC. Because of this, Beek is considered the eldest village in the Netherlands.

== Buildings ==
Noteworthy buildings:

- Sint-Hubertusmolen, (Mill of Saint Hubertus) in Klein Genhout, dated 1801-1802
- Sint-Hubertuskerk, (Church of Saint Hubertus) in Groot Genhout, by architect Alphons Boosten
- Kasteel Genbroek, a castle near Geverik

== Transportation ==
The municipality of Beek is surrounded by A2 motorway (Amsterdam-Belgian border) in the west and A76 motorway (Belgian border-German border) in the north.

The municipality has two railway stations:

- Beek-Elsloo railway station in the west
- Spaubeek railway station in the east

Beek also contains an airport:

- Maastricht Aachen Airport in the south

== Economy ==
When KLM exel operated, its head office was on the grounds of Maastricht Aachen Airport in Beek. When V Bird operated, its head office was on the grounds of the airport.

== Politics ==
The municipal council of Beek has 17 seats.

Municipal council seats
| Party | 2010 | 2014 | 2018 | 2022 | 2026 |
| CDA | 4 | 4 | 5 | 6 | 6 |
| Progressive Beek | 4 | 4 | 4 | 4 | 4 |
| BBB-NDB / Beek Lokaal | 7 | 6 | 5 | 4 | 3 |
| Interest of Beek | - | - | - | 2 | 3 |
| VVD | 2 | 1 | 2 | 1 | 1 |
| Senior Interest Beek | - | 2 | 1 | 0 | - |
| Total | 17 | 17 | 17 | 17 | 17 |

The executive board consists of four persons: Mayor:

- Christine van Basten-Boddin, (D66) 2016 - current

Aldermen:

- Ralph Diederen (CDA)
- Marcel Meurkens (BBB-NDB)
- Rob Schwillens (CDA)

== Notable people ==
- Pyke Koch (1901–1991), a Dutch artist who painted in a magic realist manner
- Léon Frissen (born 1950), a Dutch politician, former Queen's Commissioner of the province of Limburg
- Marc Borghans (born 1960), a Dutch runner
- Frans Weekers (born 1967), a Dutch politician and lawyer, Mayor of Beek 2015 to 2016
- Ralf Krewinkel (born 1974), a Dutch politician, Mayor of Beek 2011 to 2015
- Esther de Lange (born 1975), a Dutch politician, Member of the European Parliament since 2007
- Vivianne Heijnen (born 1982), a Dutch politician, Minister for the Environment
- Maud Welzen (born 1993), a Dutch model

== Gallery ==
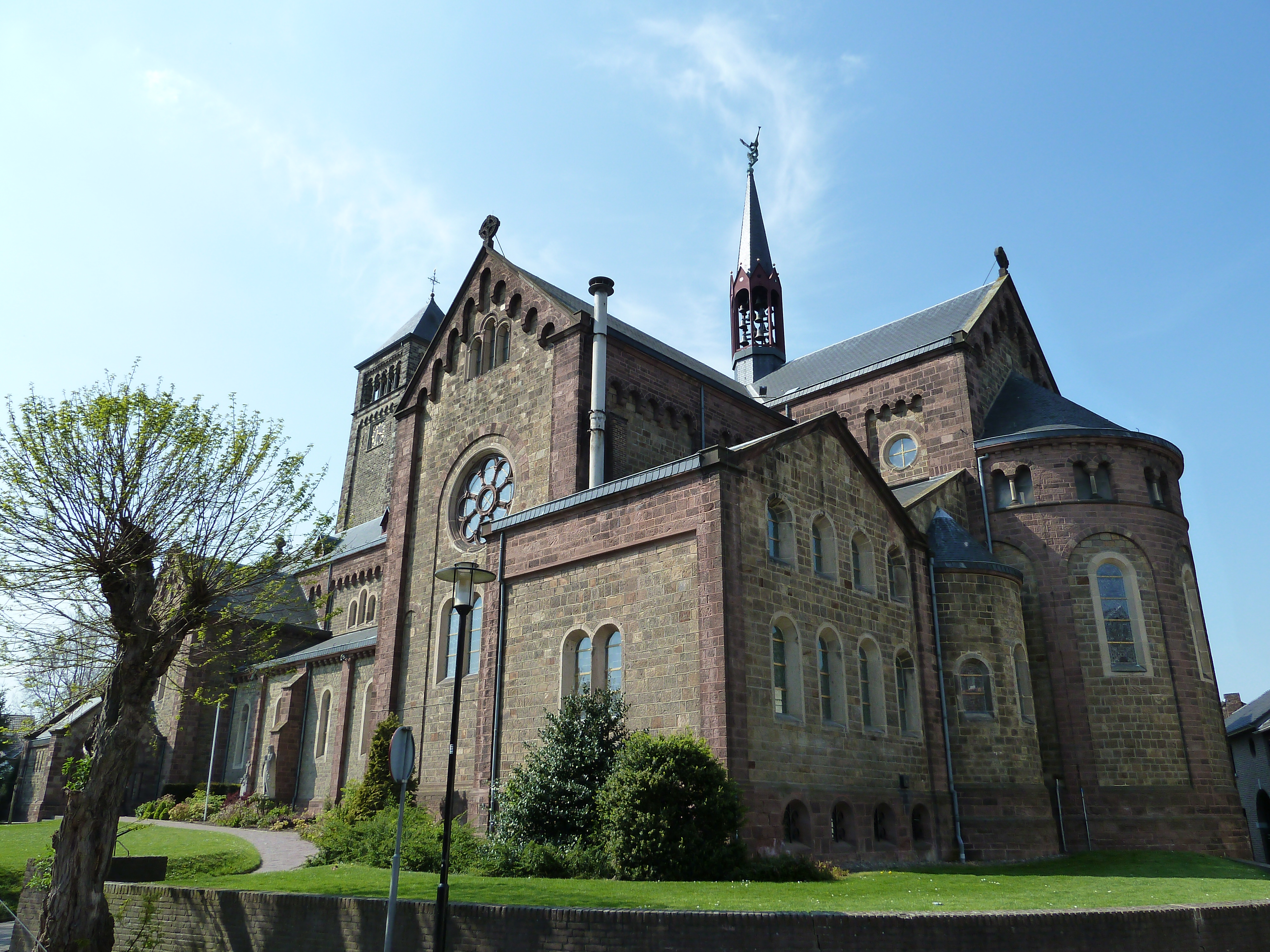
Beek, Sint-Martinuskerk

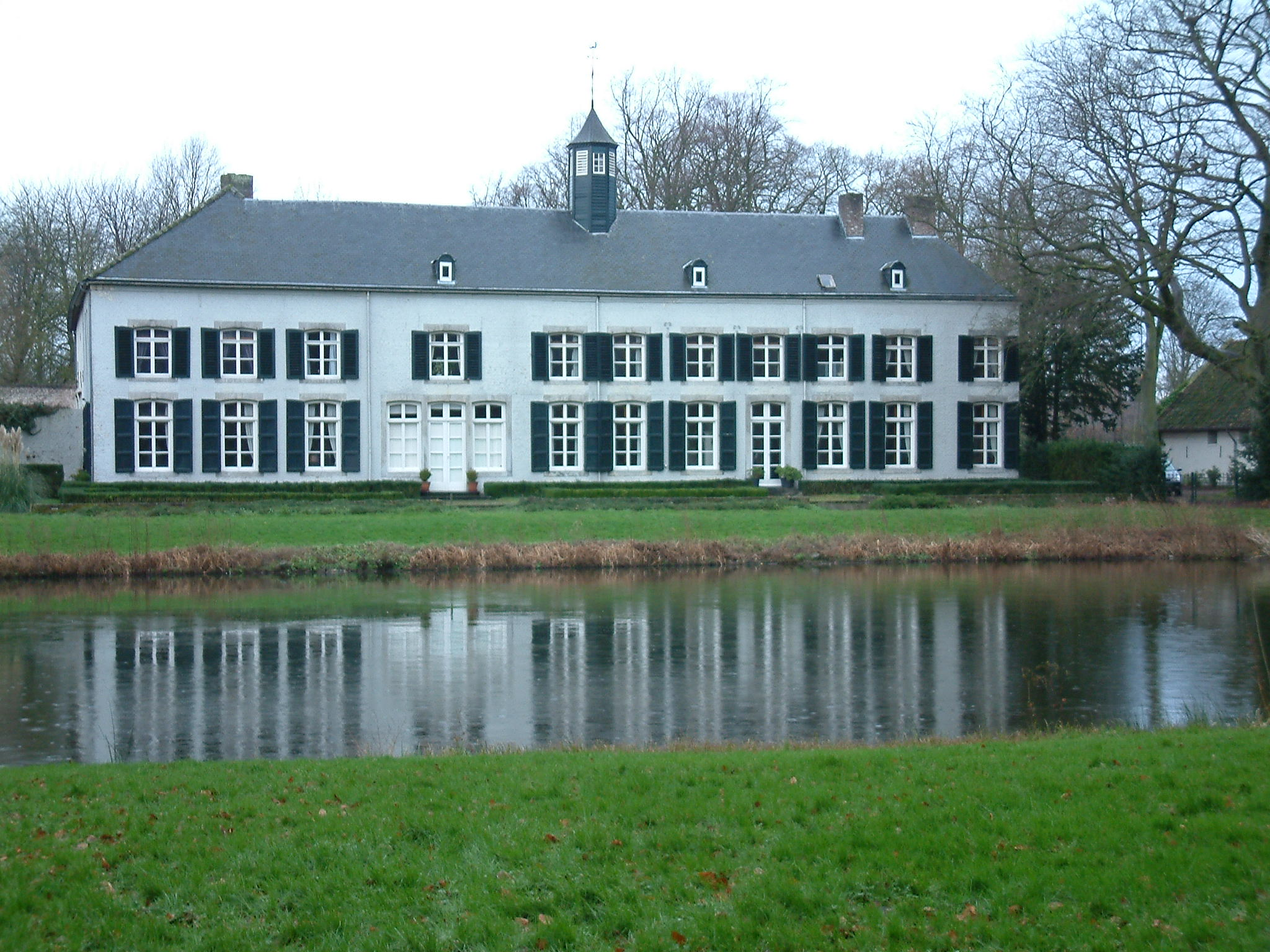
Kasteel Genbroek-oostvleugel

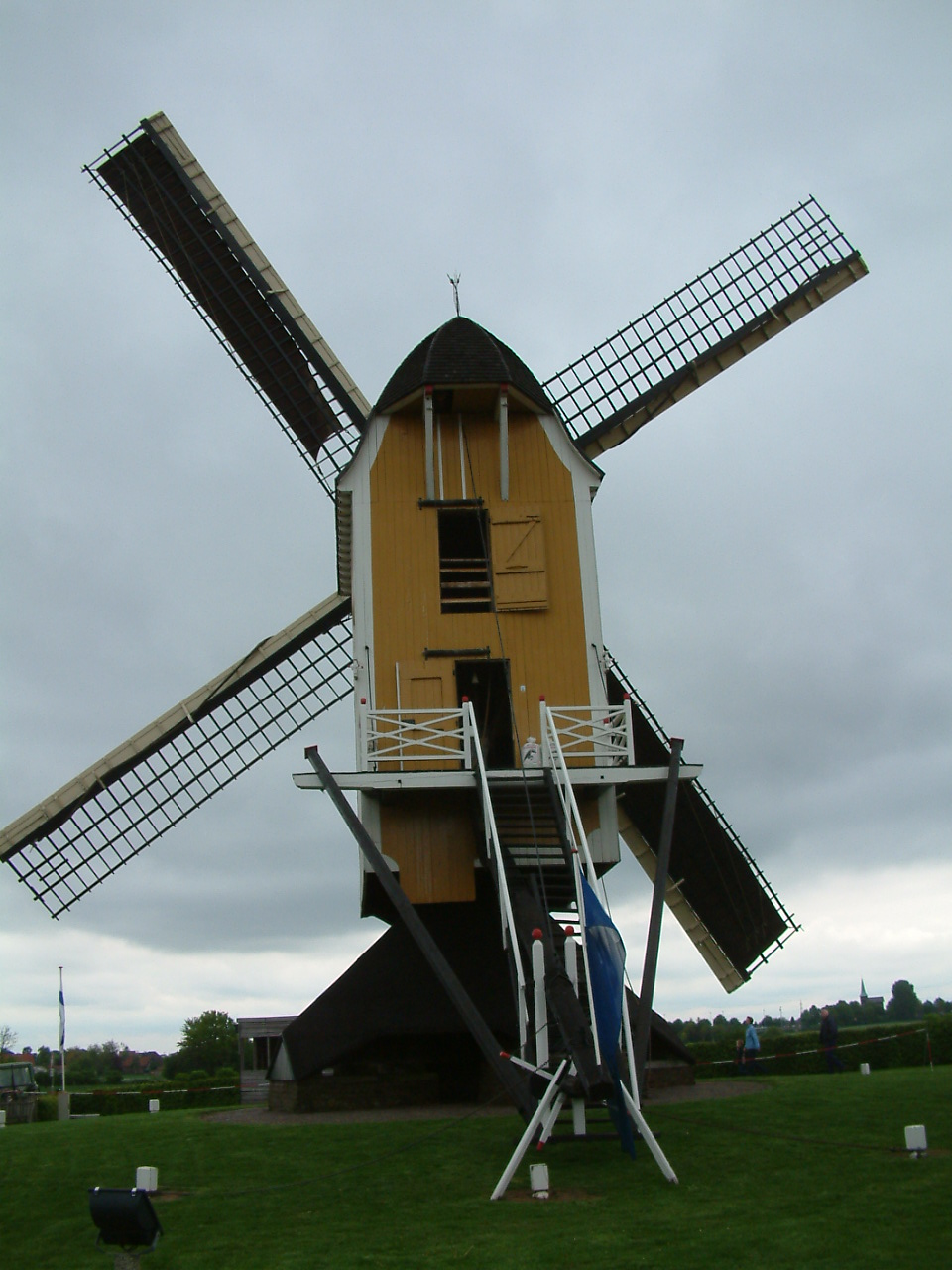
St. Hubertus molen te Genhout

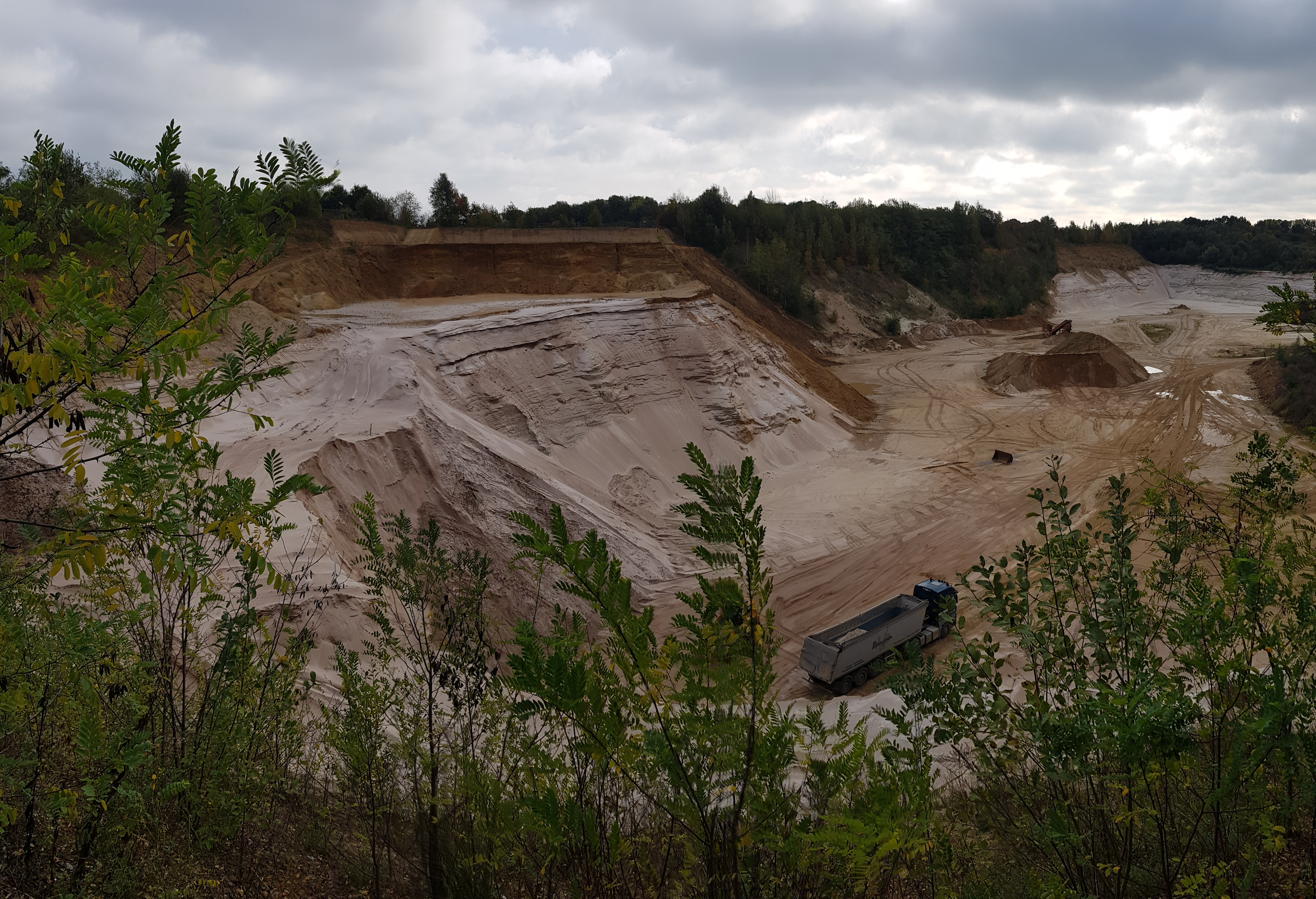
Spaubeek-Groeve Quarry, Spaubeek
