= Netherlands Handball Association =

Sports governing body in the Netherlands

Netherlands Handball Association Dutch: Nederlands Handbal Verbond NHV
- IOC nation: Netherlands (NED)
- Sport: Handball
- Other sports: Beach Handball; Wheelchair Handball
- Official website: www.handbal.nl

HISTORY
- Year of formation: 1935; 91 years ago

DEMOGRAPHICS
- Membership size: 49,379 (as of 2015)

AFFILIATIONS
- International federation: International Handball Federation (IHF)
- IHF member since: 1946; 80 years ago
- Continental association: European Handball Federation
- National Olympic Committee: Dutch Olympic Committee and Sports Federation

GOVERNING BODY
- President: Mr. Tjark de Lange (Netherlands)

HEADQUARTERS
- Address: Pastoor Bruggemanlaan 33, Oosterbeek, Renkum, Gelderland
- Country: Netherlands
- Secretary General: Mr. Bernard Bullens (Netherlands)

FINANCE
- Sponsors: Staatsloterij; TeamNL; Stanno; Odido; DHL; NH Hotel Group; Mizuno

The Netherlands Handball Association (Dutch: Nederlands Handbal Verbond) (NHV) is the national Handball association in Netherlands. NHV organizes team handball within Dutch and represents the Dutch handball internationally. The Association is a member of the International Handball Federation (IHF) and European Handball Federation (EHF).

== Leagues ==
=== Men ===
- BENE-League Handball (along with Belgium)
- NHV Eredivisie
- Eerste Divisie
- Tweede Divisie
- Hoofdklasse

=== Women ===
- NHV Eredivisie
- Eerste Divisie
- Tweede Divisie
- Hoofdklasse

=== national cups ===
- NHV Cup
- Super Cup

== International ==
- Golden League
