= Netherlands men's national handball team =

Netherlands

Information
- Nickname: Golden Boys
- Association: Netherlands Handball Association
- Coach: Staffan Olsson
- Assistant coach: Gerrie Eijlers; Wong Wai
- Most caps: Lambert Schuurs (312)

Colours
1st	2nd

Results

World Championship
- Appearances: 3 (First in 1961)
- Best result: 11th (1961)

European Championship
- Appearances: 4 (First in 2020)
- Best result: 10th (2022)
- Last updated on 28 December 2023.

The Netherlands national handball team is the national handball team of Netherlands and is controlled by the Netherlands Handball Association.

Unlike the very successful women's team, The Netherlands men's team qualified just twice for the World Championships (1961, 2025). For the 2023 World Men's Handball Championship The Netherlands received a wildcard and reached the Main Round finishing 14th overall. The team improved this result in the 2025 event to a 12th place in the final ranking.

The current squad led by starplayers Luc Steins and Kay Smits is steadily closing the gap with the leading European teams by qualifying four consecutive times for the European Championships (2020, 2022, 2024 and 2026). In only their second ever appearance at EHF EURO 2022 the Dutch men's team won three matches and drew one. The Dutch did qualify for the Main Round as well and finished as 10th overall.

== Competitive record ==
=== World Championship ===
World Championship record
Year	Round	Position	GP	W	D	L	GS	GA
(Nazi Germany) 1938	did not qualify							
(Sweden) 1954	did not qualify							
(East Germany) 1958	did not qualify							
(West Germany) 1961	Preliminary round	11	2	0	0	2	18	54
(Czechoslovakia) 1964	did not qualify							
(Sweden) 1967	did not qualify							
(France) 1970	did not qualify							
(East Germany) 1974	did not qualify							
(Denmark) 1978	did not qualify							
(West Germany) 1982	did not qualify							
(Switzerland) 1986	did not qualify							
(Czechoslovakia) 1990	did not qualify							
(Sweden) 1993	did not qualify							
(Iceland) 1995	did not qualify							
(Japan) 1997	did not qualify							
(Egypt) 1999	did not qualify							
(France) 2001	did not qualify							
(Portugal) 2003	did not qualify							
(Tunisia) 2005	did not qualify							
(Germany) 2007	did not qualify							
(Croatia) 2009	did not qualify							
(Sweden) 2011	did not qualify							
(Spain) 2013	did not qualify							
(Qatar) 2015	did not qualify							
(France) 2017	did not qualify							
(Denmark) / (Germany) 2019	did not qualify							
(Egypt) 2021	did not qualify							
(Poland) / (Sweden) 2023	Main round	14	6	3	0	3	177	165
(Croatia) / (Denmark) / (Norway) 2025	Main round	12	6	3	1	2	212	200
(Germany) 2027	Did not qualify							
(France) / (Germany) 2029	Future events							
(Denmark) / (Iceland) / (Norway) 2031	Future events							
Total	3/32	–	14	6	1	7	407	419

=== European Championship ===
European Championship record
Year	Round	Position	GP	W	D	L	GF	GA
(Portugal) 1994	did not qualify							
(Spain) 1996	did not qualify							
(Italy) 1998	did not qualify							
(Croatia) 2000	did not qualify							
(Sweden) 2002	did not qualify							
(Slovenia) 2004	did not qualify							
(Switzerland) 2006	did not qualify							
(Norway) 2008	did not qualify							
(Austria) 2010	did not qualify							
(Serbia) 2012	did not qualify							
(Denmark) 2014	did not qualify							
(Poland) 2016	did not qualify							
(Croatia) 2018	did not qualify							
(Austria) / (Norway) / (Sweden) 2020	Preliminary round	17th	3	1	0	2	80	94
(Hungary) / (Slovakia) 2022	Main round	10th	7	3	1	3	200	215
(Germany) 2024	Main round	12th	7	2	1	4	224	222
(Denmark) / (Norway) / (Sweden) 2026	Preliminary round	15th	3	1	0	2	91	97
(Portugal) / (Spain) / (Switzerland) 2028	Future events							
(Czech Republic) (Denmark) (Poland) 2030	Future events							
(France) (Germany) 2032	Future events							
Total	4/20	–	20	7	2	11	595	628

== Team ==
=== Current squad ===
Squad for the 2026 European Men's Handball Championship.

Head coach: Staffan Olsson

No.	Pos.	Name	Date of birth (age)	Height	App.	Goals	Club
3	CB	Ivar Stavast	13 January 1998 (age 28)	1.91 m	67	118	(Germany) HC Elbflorenz
5	LW	Rutger ten Velde	5 March 1997 (age 29)	1.78 m	89	351	(Germany) Frisch Auf Göppingen
11	GK	Jorick Pol	26 February 2004 (age 22)	1.99 m	13	0	(Germany) TVB Stuttgart
12	GK	Matthias Dorgelo	31 October 2002 (age 23)	2.00 m	16	2	(Denmark) SønderjyskE Herrehåndbold
14	RW	Bobby Schagen	13 January 1990 (age 36)	1.90 m	150	452	(Germany) TBV Lemgo
15	P	Lars Kooij	11 August 2000 (age 26)	1.99 m	41	96	(Germany) Bergischer HC
17	LW	Kaj Geenen	6 May 2003 (age 23)	1.86 m	37	40	(Germany) HSV Hamburg
20	RB	Niels Versteijnen	3 February 2000 (age 26)	2.00 m	67	185	(Germany) TBV Lemgo
21	P	Martijn Kleijkers	22 February 2001 (age 25)	1.88 m	24	36	(Belgium) Sporting Neerpelt
22	CB	Luc Steins	22 March 1995 (age 31)	1.73 m	127	370	(France) Paris Saint-Germain
24	P	Driek Manders	29 November 2004 (age 21)	1.97 m	5	6	(Netherlands) HC Bevo
25	LB	Destin van Dijk	2 November 2001 (age 24)	2.02 m	9	1	(Hungary) Szigetszentmiklósi KSK
26	LB	Bram van de Vreede	16 April 2007 (age 19)	1.98 m	5	2	(Germany) ASV Hamm-Westfalen
27	RW	Alec Smit	15 May 1999 (age 27)	1.82 m	67	84	(Denmark) Aalborg Håndbold
29	RB	Marek Skwarczynski	22 July 2006 (age 20)	1.92 m	2	0	(Germany) ATSV Habenhausen
34	RB	Tom Jansen	18 June 1998 (age 28)	1.99 m	34	52	(Germany) TuS Ferndorf
77	LB	Dani Baijens	5 May 1998 (age 28)	1.82 m	102	320	(Germany) Rhein-Neckar Löwen
97	LB	Reinier Taboada	2 June 1997 (age 29)	1.92 m	5	11	(Portugal) Benfica
