= Vlug en Lenig =

Dutch handball club

- Full name: Omni-Sportvereniging Vlug en Lenig
- Short name: V&L
- Founded: September 1, 1949; 76 years ago
- Arena: Glanerbrook, Geleen
- Capacity: 2500
- League: Women: Eredivisie; Men: Eerste Klasse
- Club colours
Home	Away

Vlug en Lenig is a Dutch handball club in Geleen. The club was founded on 1 September 1949.

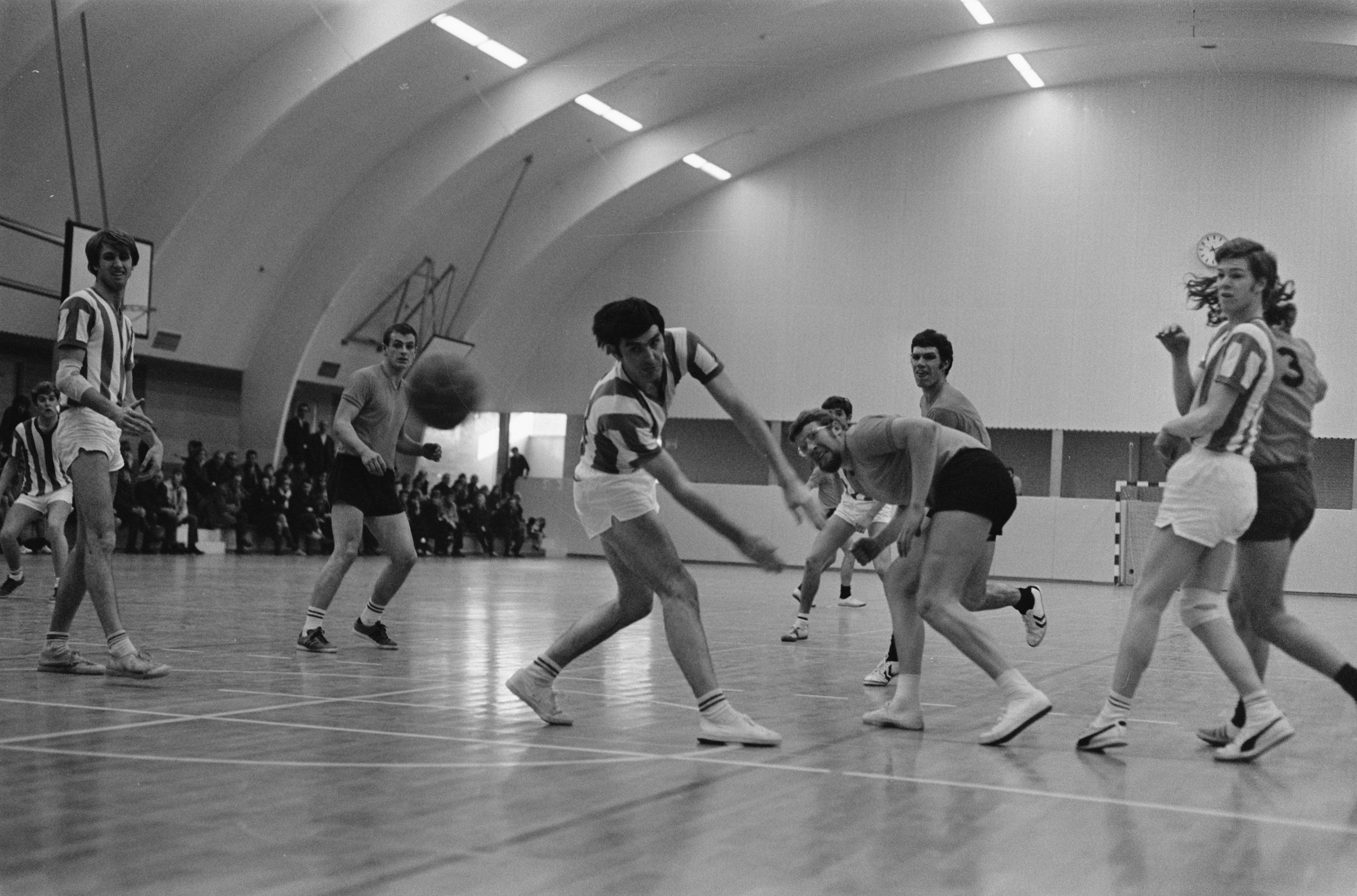
Niloc against V&L in 1970

The men's team of V&L won the Dutch National Championship in 1982, 1983, 1984, 1986 and 2002. The club has participated in European club team tournaments several times. It has also won the national cup three times, in 1983, 1985 and 1994.

In 2008, V&L co-operated with HV Sittardia and HV BFC to form a stronger men's team. The project was called Tophandbal Zuid-Limburg and two team were formed: Limburg Lions and Limburg Wild Dogs (later turned into the second team of Limburg Lions). In 2016, the management of BFC decided to take no longer part in the collabation.

Also the woman's team of V&L has been successful, they won the Dutch National Championship in 1987 and 1990. In 2010, the woman's team promoted back to the eredivisie after one year of absence, where they have been a stable factor since.

== Accomplishments ==
=== Men ===
- NHV Eredivisie:
  - Winners (5) : 1982, 1983, 1984, 1986, 2002
  - Runner-Up (7) : 1968, 1970, 1985, 1989, 1991, 1996, 1998
- Dutch Handball Cup:
  - Winners (3) : 1983, 1985, 1994
  - Runner-Up (8) : 1980, 1981, 1988, 1989, 1990, 1995, 1998, 2003
- Dutch Supercup:
  - Runner-Up (2) : 1994, 2002

=== Woman ===
- NHV Eredivisie:
  - Winners (2) : 1987, 1990
  - Runner-Up (3) : 2004, 2005, 2007
- Dutch Handball Cup:
  - Runner-Up (7) : 1986, 1988, 1991, 1992, 1993, 2004, 2008
- Dutch Supercup:
  - Runner-Up (2) : 1992, 1993
