= Gottfried Huyn von Geleen =

Dutch professional soldier in the Bavarian and Imperial armies

Gottfried Huyn van Geleen
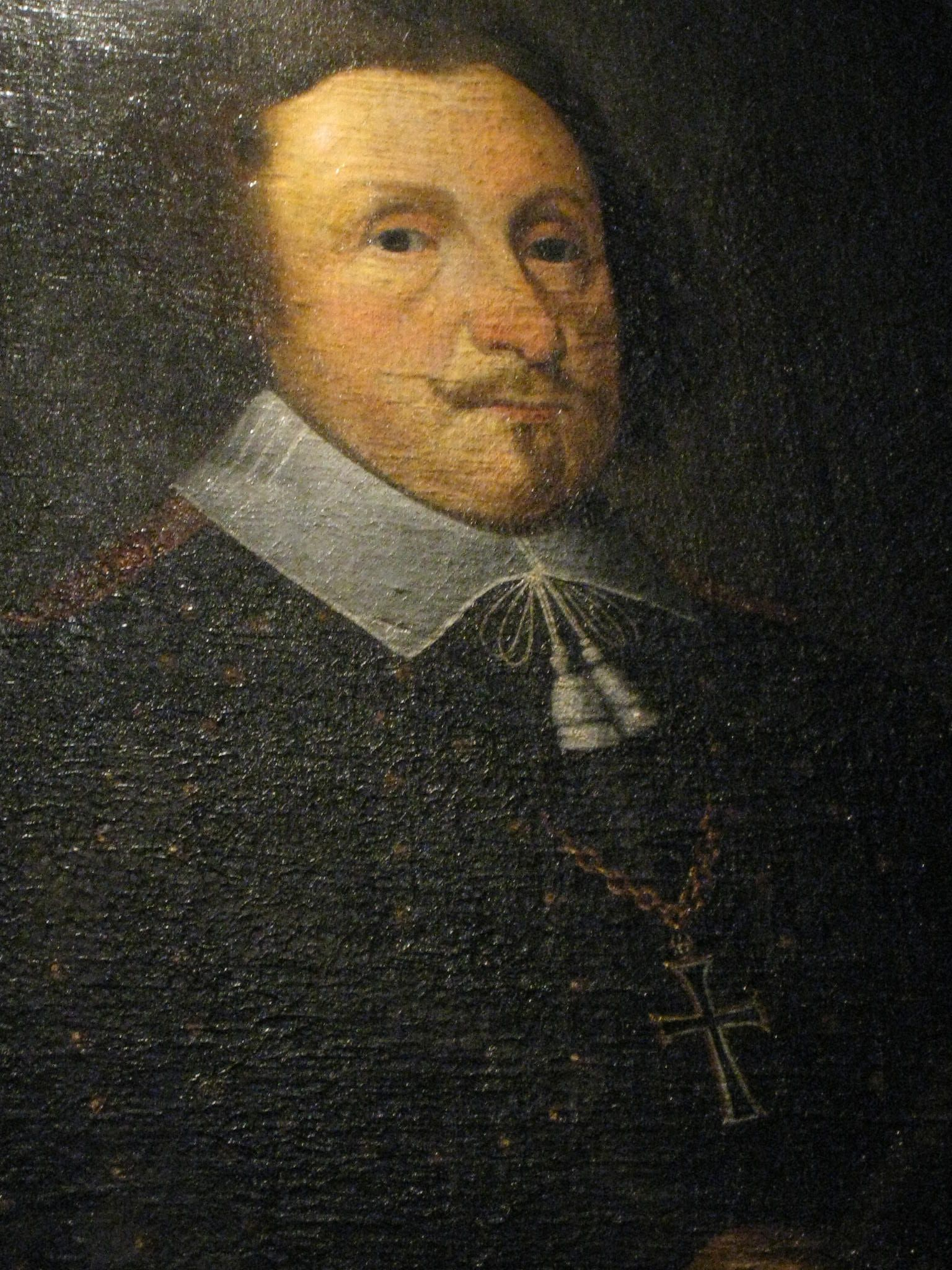
- Gottfried Huyn van Geleen
- Born: c. 1595; Jansgeleen Castle, Limburg
- Died: 27 August 1657; Maastricht
- Military career
- Allegiance: Habsburg monarchy Electorate of Bavaria
- Rank: Generalfeldmarschall
- Conflicts: Thirty Years' War; Siege of Magdeburg; Breitenfeld; Oldendorf; Siege of Bingen; Siege of Friedberg; Nördlingen (POW); Bavarian campaign

Gottfried Huyn van Geleen, (Note: Officially Godefridus Comes ab Huyn Baro de Geleen) (c. 1595 to 27 August 1657) was a professional soldier from Maastricht who served in the Bavarian and Imperial armies during the Thirty Years' War. He was created Baron Geleen in February 1654.

== Personal details ==
Gottfried Huyn van Geleen was born around 1595 in Jansgeleen Castle, near Schimmert in the Dutch province of Limburg. He was the younger of two children born to Arnold van Huyn (c. 1555-1638), and Margaretha van Bocholtz (c. 1575-1634). His elder sister Alexandrine (1594-1654) married Alexander von Velen, an Imperial Fieldmarshall.

Geleen himself is not recorded as having married or left surviving children. His estate and titles passed to his nephew when he died in 1657.

== Career ==
When the Eighty Years' War broke out in 1568, Arnold van Huyn remained loyal to Spain, and was appointed Governor of Limburg and Maastricht in opposition to the candidate nominated by the Dutch Republic. Geleen followed his father, and like a number of contemporaries from the region, including von Bronckhorst-Gronsfeld and Jan van der Croon, opted for Imperial service. His military career apparently started in 1615 with Spanish forces in Italy, but when the Thirty Years' War began in 1618, he was captain in a Bavarian infantry regiment. In that capacity, he served in the Catholic League army led by Tilly which put down the Bohemian Revolt on behalf of Emperor Ferdinand.

He continued to serve under Tilly over the next few years, primarily in Lower Saxony against the Danes, who entered the war against the emperor in 1625. At some point during this period, he was captured near Elze and held in Holstein for over a year before being released. Now colonel of his regiment, following Swedish intervention in the Thirty Years' War in 1630, he was appointed commander of the garrison of Hamelin, and took part in the Siege of Magdeburg. He was also present at Breitenfeld in September 1631, a serious defeat from which he managed to escape.

Key locations in article (dark green = modern Germany)

Despite this setback, Geleen spent 1632 successfully preventing the Duke of Brunswick, a Swedish ally, from retaking his capital, Wolfenbüttel. In March 1633, Brunswick besieged Hamelin, and in July, Geleen left the town with his cavalry to link up with a relief army led by Lothar von Bönninghausen. On 8 July, he commanded the Imperial centre at the Battle of Oldendorf, where they were defeated by Brunswick.

In 1636, Geleen was promoted major-general. He fought in with the Imperial and Bavarian armies under Hatzfeld and Count of Götz against Sweden and helped in the campaign that drove the Swedes under the command of Johan Banér back to the Baltic.

In 1639, after unification with the Bavarians under Franz von Mercy, the Emperor transferred the command on the Rhine to Geleen. He crossed the Rhine near Speyer in October that year, but soon had to recross in order to drive the enemy from the Rheingau. In September 1640, after he had besieged and occupied Bingen, he combined his force of 4,000 infantry and 2,000 cavalry with the imperial army under Leopold Wilhelm at Fritzlar, but detached his force from the main army, to besiege Friedberg, and then wintered in the bishoprics of Würzburg and Bamberg to guard them against an intended invasion of the Swedes.

In early 1641, he helped to drive Banér from the Upper Palatinate and then marched to the Rhine in April, where he spent the next year in Cologne under Hatzfeld on an indecisive campaign against Guébriant. Soon after leaving the army, Geleen was retired as Province Commander (Landcomthur) of the Teutonic Order in the Bailiwick of Alden Biesen. But in 1644 he was called out of retirement by the Emperor on the advice of the Westphalian Circle.

Geleen and his troops joined Mercy at Aschaffenburg and followed him into Swabia. There Geleen commanded the right wing at the disastrous battle of Allerheim (Second Battle of Nördlingen). Mercy was killed and Geleen was captured, but after a short captivity Geleen was exchanged for the French General Gramont and then took command of the Bavarian army.

In 1646, Geleen, under the command of Leopold Wilhelm, took part in the campaign against Turenne and Wrangel, and in March of the following year, after the elector of Bavaria concluded ceasefire, he resigned from his command. He died in 1657 at Maastricht or Castle Alden Biesen; his lineage became extinct with the death of his nephew.

== Sources ==
- Blok, P.C; Molhuysen, P.J; Kosman, K.R, eds. (1927). Nieuw Nederlandsch biografisch woordenboek, Volume VII (in Dutch). A.W.Suthoffs.
- Guthrie, William P (2003). The later Thirty Years War: from the Battle of Wittstock to the Treaty of Westphalia. Greenwood Publishing Group. ISBN 0-313-32408-5.
- Heilmann, Johann von, ed. (1868). Kriegsgeschichte von Bayern, Franken, Pfalz und Schwaben: von 1506 - 1651 (in German). München. pp. 1112–1115.
- Landmann, Carl von (1878). "Geleen und Amsterad, Gottfried Huyn Graf von". Allgemeine Deutsche Biographie (ADB) (in German). Vol. 8. Duncker & Humblot. p. 534.
- Schmidt-Brentano, Antonio (2022). Die kaiserlichen Generale 1618 – 1655; Ein biographisches Lexikon (PDF) (in German). Österreichisches Staatsarchiv. pp. 186–190.
- Stèphani, Jean Pierre R. (1877), Mémoires pour servir à l'histoire monastique du pays de Liége, publ. par J. Alexandre. 2 tom ... (in French), p. 277
- Wilson, Peter H. (2009). Europe's Tragedy: A History of the Thirty Years War. Allen Lane. ISBN 978-0-7139-9592-3.
