= Spaubeek =

Spaubeek Sjpaubik / Sjpawbik
- Village
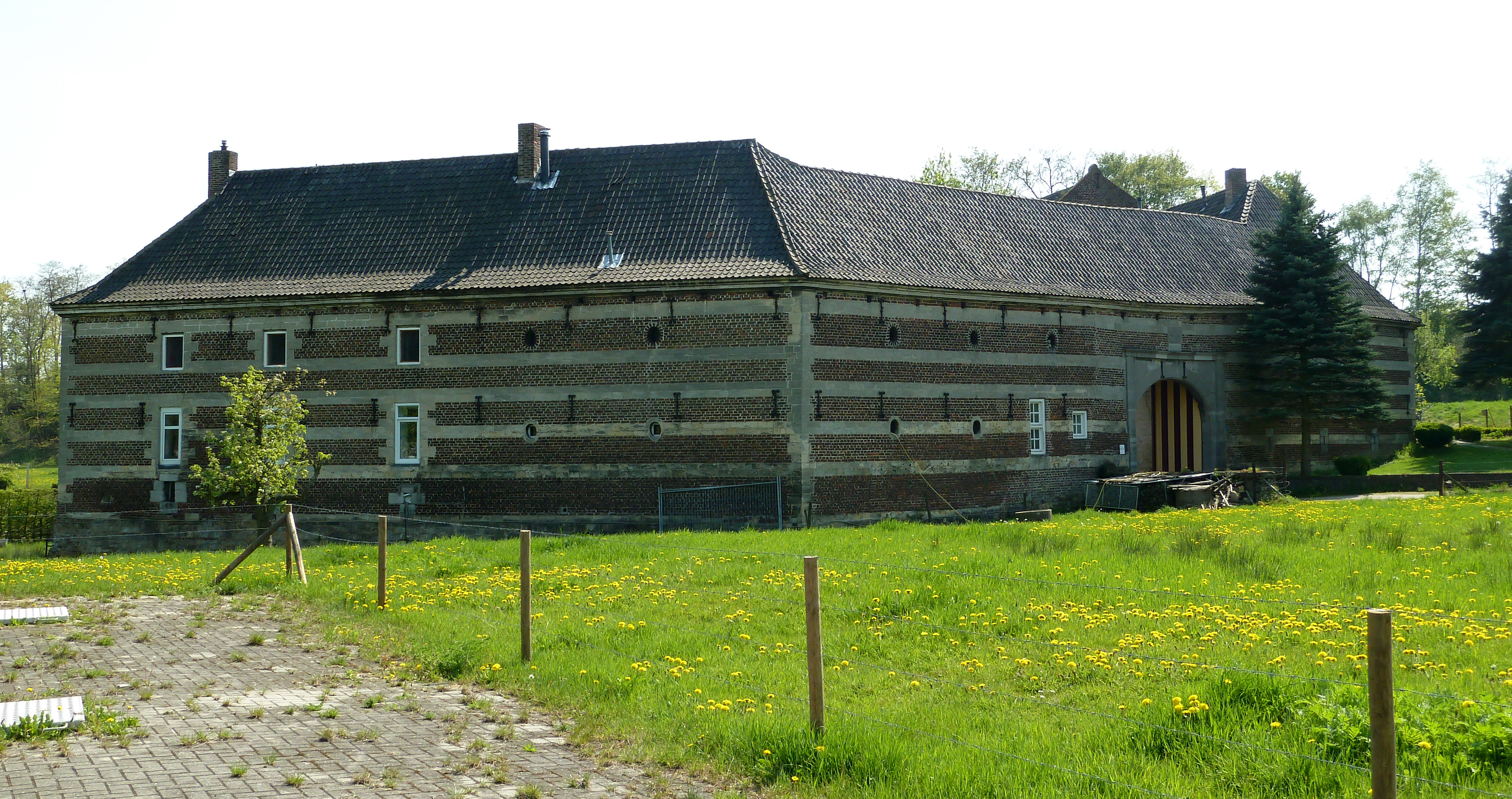
- Jansgeleen Castle

- Flag Coat of arms

- Location in the Netherlands Location in the province of Limburg in the Netherlands
- Coordinates: 50°56′16″N 5°50′29″E
- Country: Netherlands
- Province: Limburg
- Municipality: Beek

Area
  - Total: 5.36 km^{2} (2.07 sq mi)
- Elevation: 93 m (305 ft)

Population (2021)
  - Total: 3,345
  - Density: 624/km^{2} (1,620/sq mi)
- Time zone: UTC+1 (CET)
  - Summer (DST): UTC+2 (CEST)
- Postal code: 6176
- Dialing code: 046

Spaubeek is a village in the Dutch province of Limburg. It is located in the municipality of Beek, about 3 km south of the town of Geleen. Spaubeek was a separate municipality until 1982, when it was merged with Beek.

== History ==
The village was first mentioned in 1175 as Spaltbeke, and means "valley with a brook". Spaubeek is a village which developed in the Middle Ages along the northern bank of Geleenbeek. Three linear settlements later appeared on the southern bank. In 1557, Jansgeleen Castle became the seat for the heerlijkheid Geleen en Spaubeek.

The Catholic St Laurentius Church is a three-aisled basilica-like church made out of sandstone which was constructed in 1925 and 1926 as a replacement of the 1837 church.

Huis Ten Dijken is an estate from the 17th century. The U-shaped residential area surrounded by a moat with an attached L-shaped office building. It was enlarged and modified several times during its history.

Spaubeek was home to 222 people in 1840. In 1896, a railway station opened on the Sittard to Herzogenrath (Germany) railway line. The railway line physically separated the northern settlement from the southern settlement. The A76 later increased the separation. Between 1 November 1875 and c. 1880, there was an early station of the Poor Handmaids of Jesus Christ for medical aid to the population.

Spaubeek was an independent municipality until 1982. The main part was merged into Beek. A smaller part was added to the municipality of Geleen.

== Jansgeleen Castle ==
The history of Spaubeek was closely connected to that of the Jansgeleen Castle, nowadays called Sint Jansgeleen. This castle, built as House Spaubeek at a bench in the small Geleen river in the 13th century, was the first seat of the former County of Geleen in the 16th century. It got its name Heer Jansgelene after one of the former owners, Lord Jan Rode van Opsinnich in the 15th century, but was later erroneously renamed as Sint Jansgeleen after St. John the Baptist.

The castle, already in a bad shape at the end of the 19th century, and further damaged by the mine galleries of the nearby big Maurits mine at Geleen in the 1920s, was finally demolished in the 1930s. Only the buildings of the water mill (Jansmolen, hence Sint Jansmolen) and the forecourt (16th century) have remained, now both provincial monuments.

== People from Spaubeek ==
- Dennis Dengering, football player
- Vivianne Heijnen, politician
- Robin Piso, musician

== Gallery ==
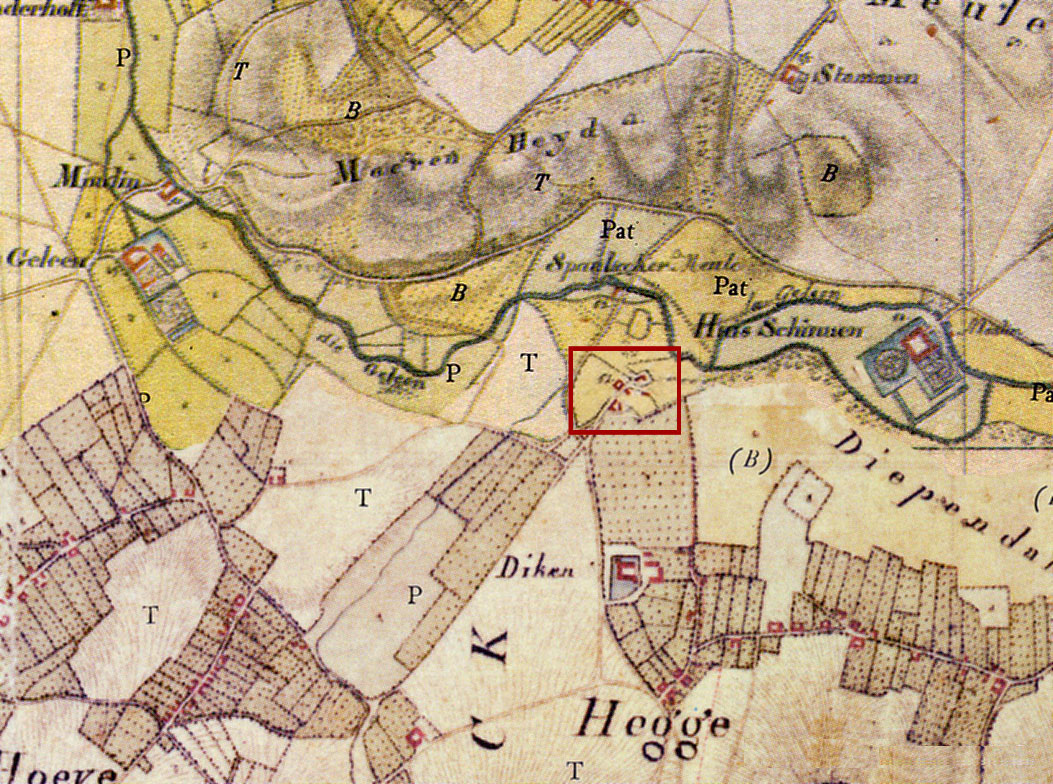
The old centre of Spaubeek (framed in red) on a map by Tranchot and Von Müffling from 1803

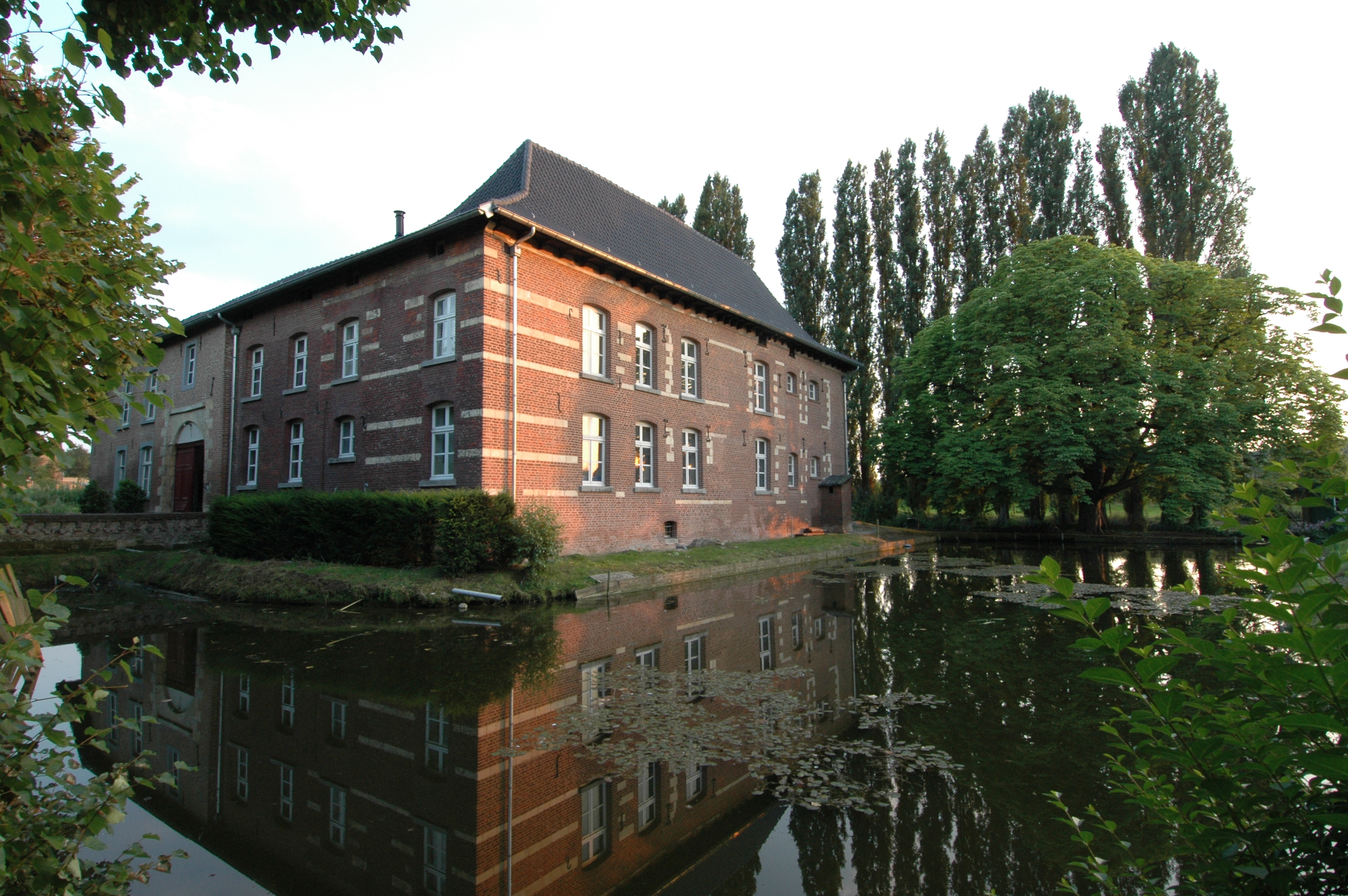
Huis ten Dijcken

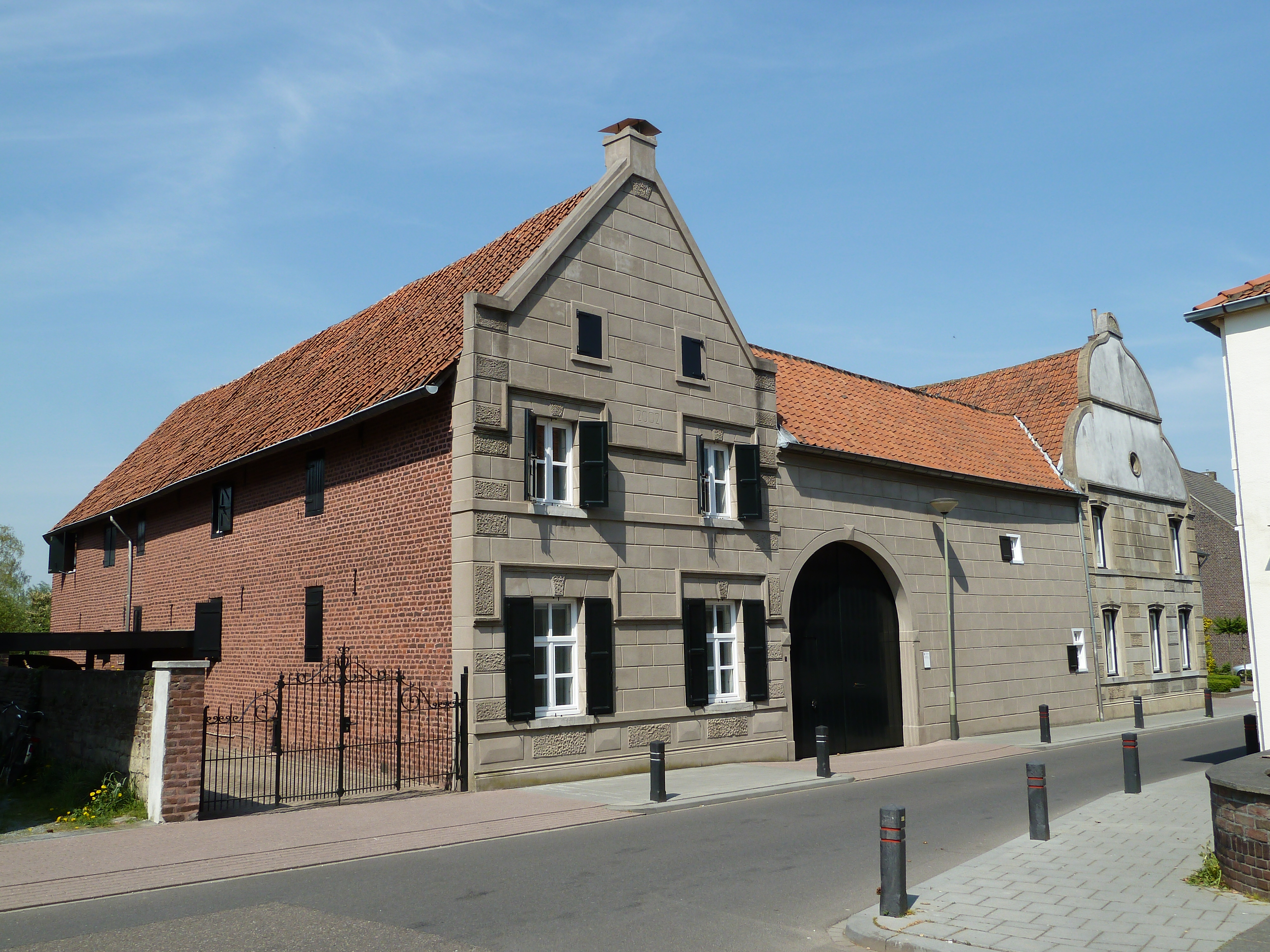
Building in Spaubeek

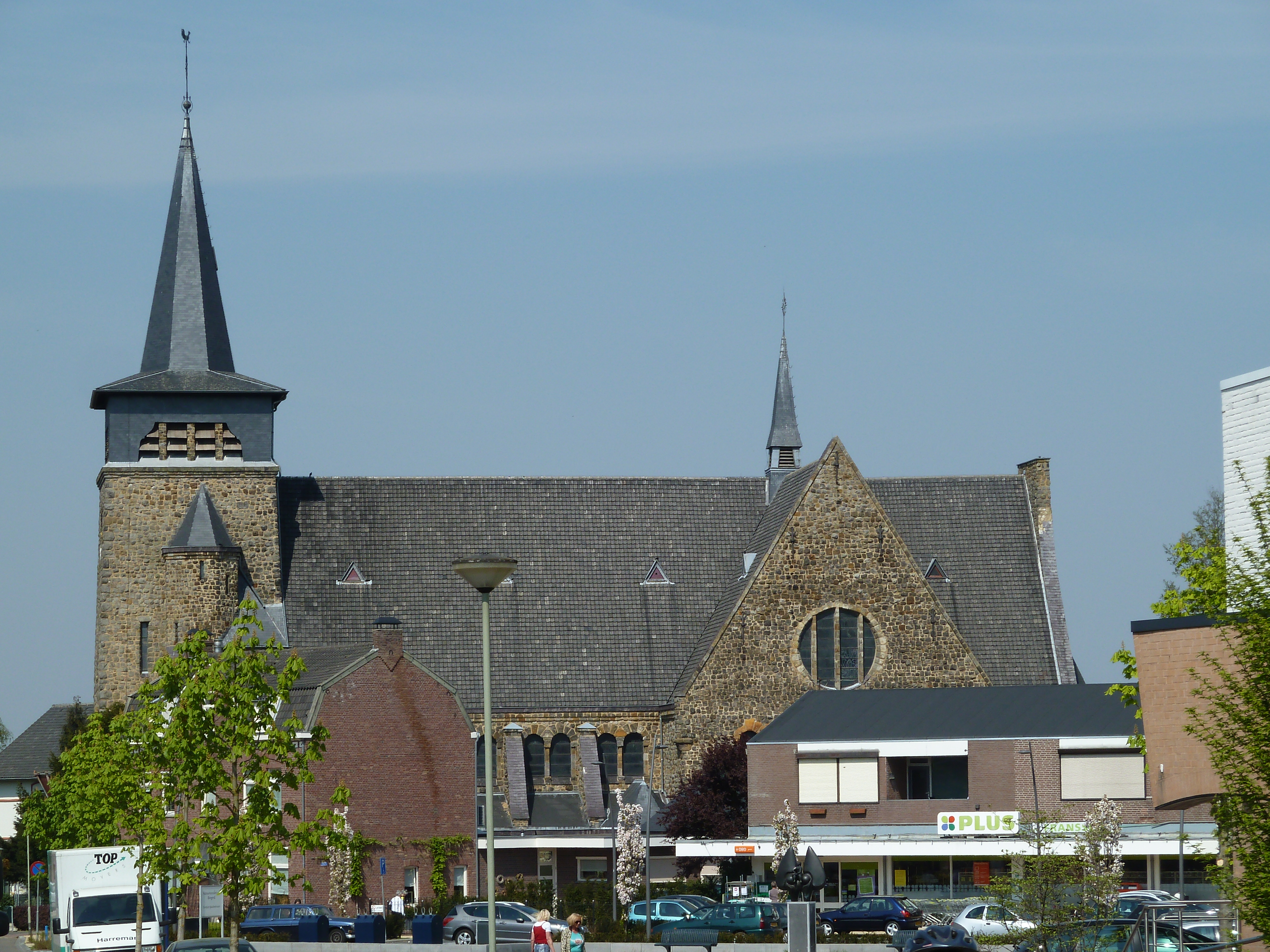
St Laurentius Church
