= Jansgeleen Castle =

- Spaubeek, the Netherlands
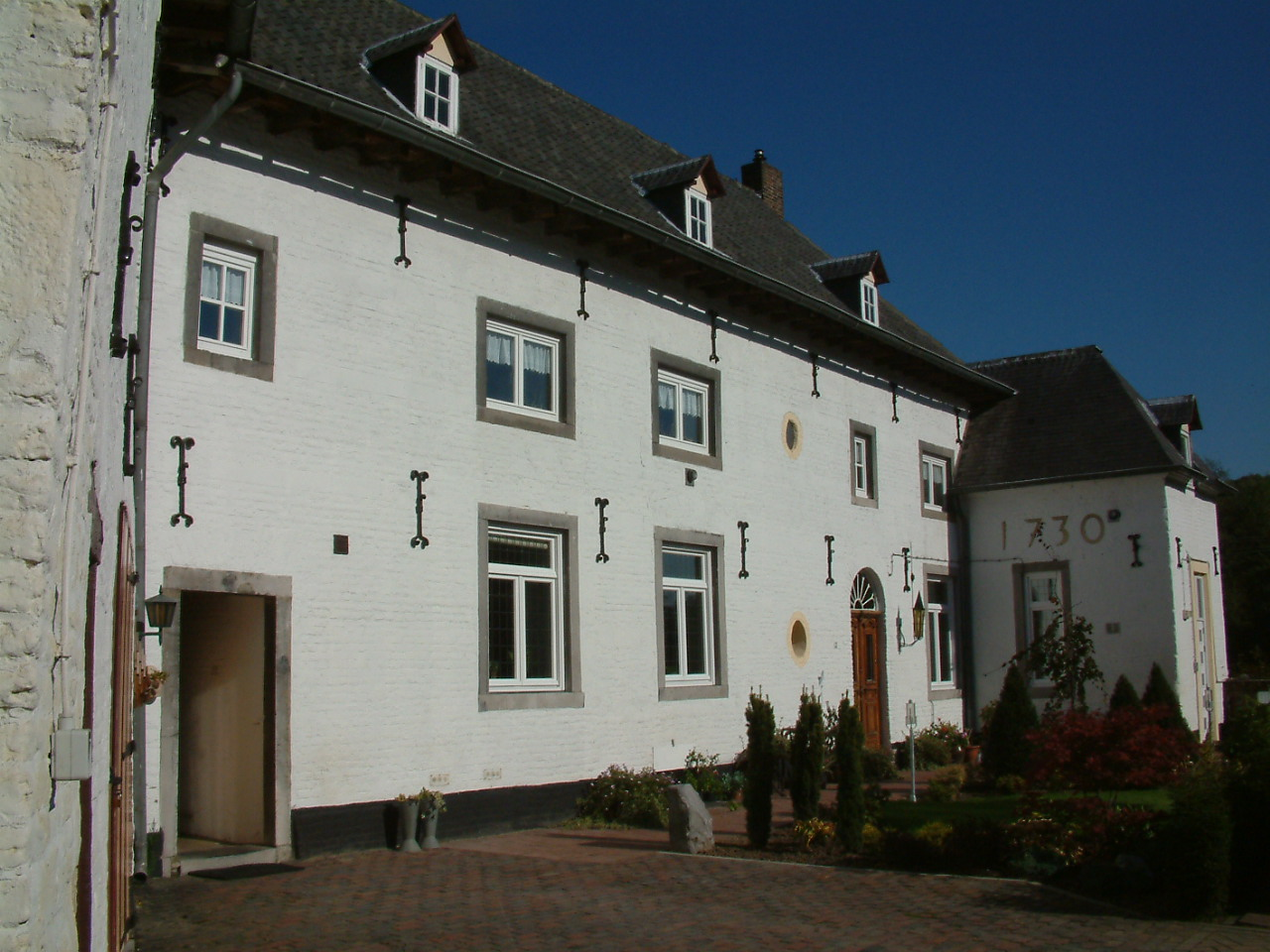
- Jansgeleen Castle, forecourt

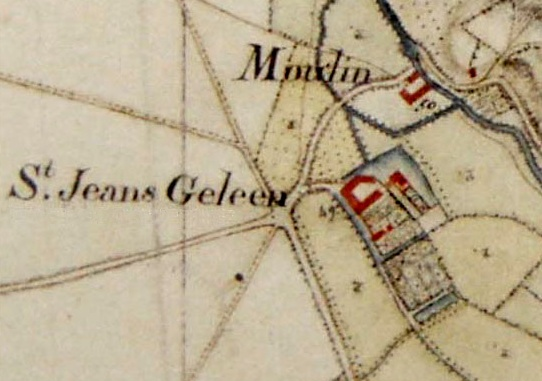
- Detail of a map by Tranchot and Von Müffling (1803); Jansgeleen Castle and the water mill Jansmolen

Site information
- Type: Castle

Location
- the Netherlands
- Coordinates: 50°56′N 5°51′E

Site history
- Built: 1300
- Demolished: 1930 (partly)

Jansgeleen Castle, now erroneously called Sint-Jansgeleen or Sint Jansgeleen, was a medieval castle in the little village of Spaubeek, in the Dutch province of Limburg. Spaubeek is located in the municipality of Beek, about 3 km south of the town of Geleen. Spaubeek was a separate municipality until 1982, when it was merged with Beek.

The history of Spaubeek was closely connected to that of Jansgeleen Castle. This castle, built as House Spaubeek at a bench in the small Geleen river in the 13th century, was the first seat of the former County of Geleen in the 16th century. It got its name Heer Jansgelene after one of the former owners, Lord Jan Rode van Opsinnich in the 15th century, but was later erroneously renamed as Sint Jansgeleen after St. John the Baptist.

The castle, already in a bad shape at the end of the 19th century, and further damaged by the mine galleries of the nearby big Maurits mine at Geleen in the 1920s, was finally demolished in the 1930s. Only the buildings of the water mill (Jansmolen, hence Sint Jansmolen) and the forecourt (16th century) have remained, now both provincial monuments.

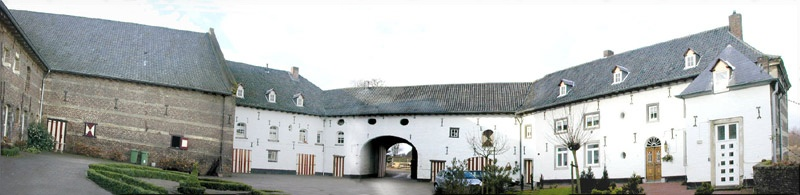
Jansgeleen Castle, forecourt. Panoramic view

== See also ==
- List of castles in the Netherlands
