= Staatsmijn Maurits =

Coal mine in Lutterade, Geleen, Limburg, Netherlands

- Location within Netherlands
- Location: Lutterade, Geleen, Limburg, Netherlands; 50°58′22″N 5°49′28″E
- Products: Coal
- Production: 96,214,000 tonnes
- Opened: 1926
- Closed: 1967
- Company: DSM

Staatsmijn Maurits was a state-owned coal mine in Geleen, Netherlands. In 1911 the Dutch Government bought the concessions "Maasvelden". In 1912 and 1913 drillings were carried out by the Internationale Bohrgesellschaft Erkelenz in the areas west of the Staatsmijn Emma and Staatsmijn Hendrik concessions. Drillings were made at the towns of Geleen-Lutterade, Krawinkel and Schinnen. Additional shallow drillings were made near Urmond.

In 1915 it was decided to position the mine at Lutterade, Geleen. Railways were constructed for connection with the railway Sittard-Maastricht. In 1916 it was decided to name this 4th State Mine "Maurits", after 17th century stadtholder Maurice of Nassau, Prince of Orange.

In 1916, construction of the shafts was begun and the mine was taken in production in 1926. In 1947 the mine was connected to the Emma Mine by a 13 km straight tunnel. In the second half of the 1940s and in the 1950s the mine was expanded, and mining reached a depth of 810 m. A third shaft was completed in 1958. At the time of completion of the third shaft, the Maurits mine was the largest two-shafts mine in the world. It was the largest coal mine in the Netherlands. When in the beginning of the 1960s the economic tide for coal mining turned, it was already anticipated to close the Maurits as one of the first mines. The mine was finally closed down in 1967. The surface facilities were afterwards demolished.

Directly adjacent to the mine site, DSM had already decades before started with cokes production and gasproduction. The "Stikstof Bindingsbedrijf" (SBB - or "nitrogen bonding plant") became the locus for the next step in the history of DSM: it became (and still is) a large chemicals company.
