= Jasper Adams (handballer) =

Dutch handball player (born 1989)

Personal information
- Born: 3 July 1989 (age 37) Geleen, Netherlands
- Height: 2.00 m (6 ft 7 in)

Sport
- Sport: Handball
- Position: Left back
- Current club: Limburg Lions
- Number: 25

Senior clubs
- Years: Team
- -2014: RKHV Volendam
- 2014-2018: TV Emsdetten
- 2018-: Limburg Lions
National team
Years	Team	Apps	(Gls)
2008-	Netherlands	107	(206)
- Updated on December 2022

Jasper Adams (born 3 July 1989) is a Dutch handball player for Limburg Lions and the Dutch national team.

He represented the Netherlands at the 2020 European Men's Handball Championship.
