= Myrthe Hilkens =

Dutch journalist, non-fiction writer and politician

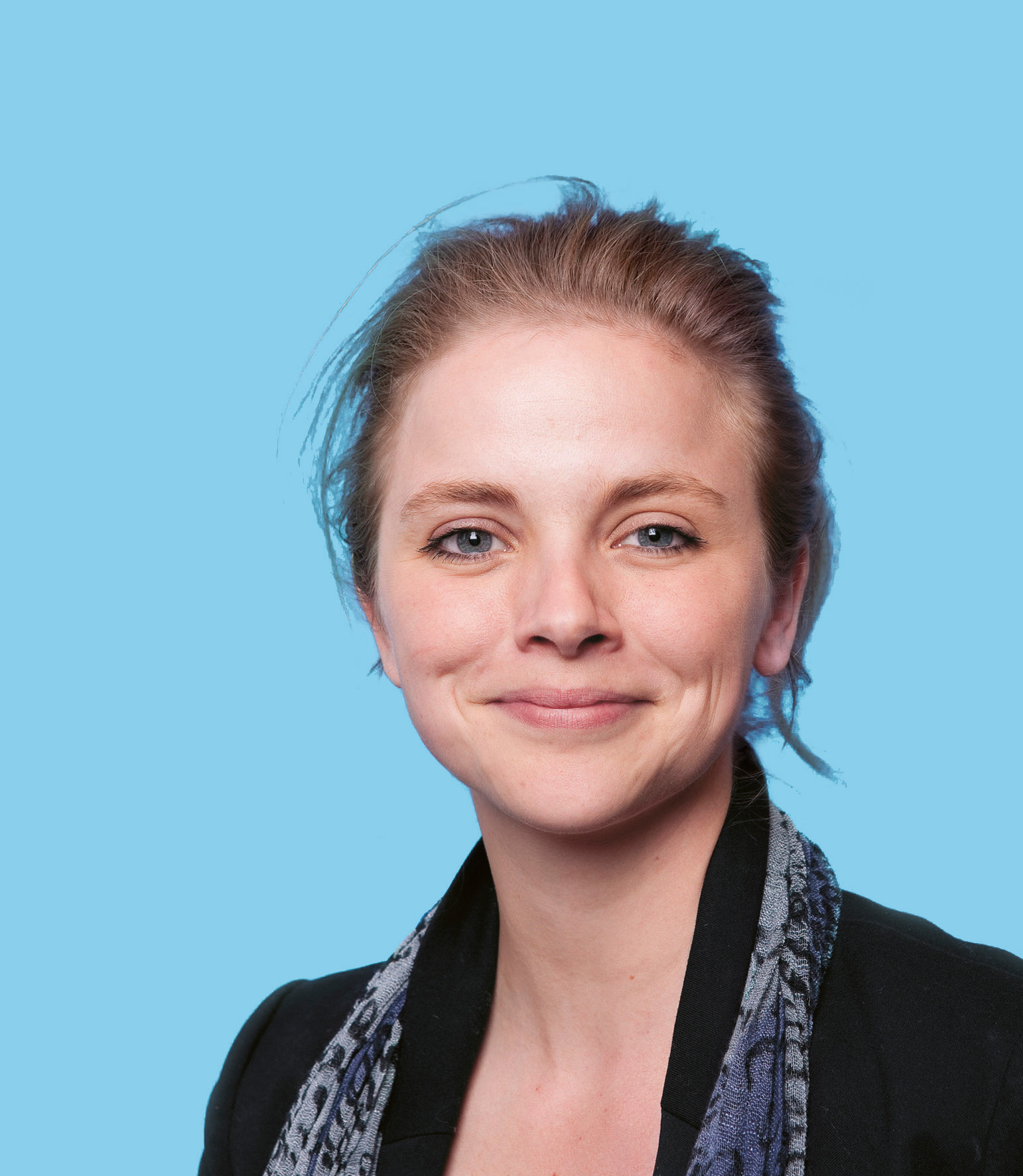

Member of the House of Representatives of the Netherlands
- In office 17 January 2012 – 29 August 2013
- Preceded by: Sharon Dijksma / Job Cohen
- Succeeded by: Roelof van Laar
- In office 12 April 2011 – 2 August 2011
- Preceded by: Nebahat Albayrak
- Succeeded by: Nebahat Albayrak

Personal details
- Born: Myrthe Hilkens; 31 January 1979 (age 47) Geleen, Netherlands
- Party: Labour Party (Partij van de Arbeid - PvdA)
- Education: Fontys Academy of Journalism (BA)
- Occupation: Journalist, non-fiction writer, politician
- Website: (in Dutch) Labour Party website

Myrthe Hilkens (born 31 January 1979 in Geleen) is a Dutch journalist, non-fiction writer, and politician. As a member of the Labour Party (Partij van de Arbeid), she was a temporary member of the House of Representatives of the Netherlands from April till August 2011, replacing Nebahat Albayrak, who was on maternity leave. As an MP, she dealt with matters of the European Union. On 17 January 2012, she became an MP once again, but she left parliament on 29 August 2013.

Hilkens grew up in Geleen, and later in Breda. She was partially raised as a Catholic, but renounced religion. She studied journalism at Fontys Academy of Journalism in Tilburg, and works as a freelance journalist and non-fiction writer. In 2003, she lived for half a year in an Israeli kibbutz.

Hilkens opposes the influence of pornography on society, and wrote a book about the subject called McSex, de pornoficatie van de samenleving (2008).
