= Geleen =

- City
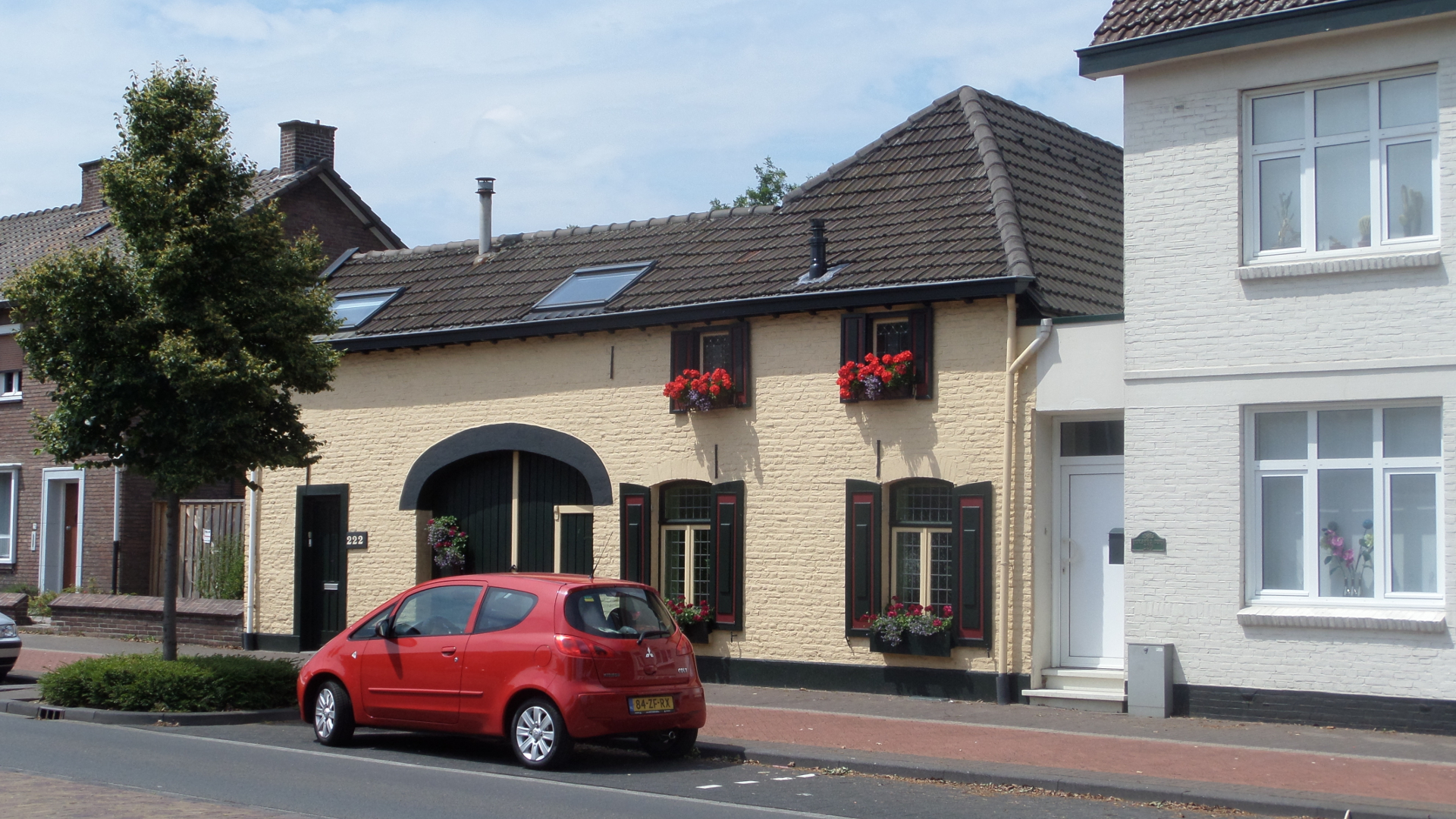
- The Krawinkel neighbourhood

- Flag Coat of arms

- Location in the Netherlands Location in the province of Limburg in the Netherlands
- Coordinates: 50°58′N 5°50′E
- Country: Netherlands
- Province: Limburg
- Municipality: Sittard-Geleen

Area
  - Total: 19.64 km^{2} (7.58 sq mi)
- Elevation: 32 m (105 ft)

Population (2021)
  - Total: 31,245
  - Density: 1,591/km^{2} (4,120/sq mi)
- Time zone: UTC+1 (CET)
  - Summer (DST): UTC+2 (CEST)
- Postal code: 6160-6167
- Dialing code: 046
- Major roads: A76, A2, N276, N294

Geleen (Dutch pronunciation: [ɣəˈleːn]; Limburgish: Gelaen [ɣəˈlɛːn]) is a city in the southern part of the province of Limburg in the Netherlands. With 31,670 inhabitants in 2020, it is part of the municipality of Sittard-Geleen. Geleen is situated along the river Geleenbeek, a right tributary to the river Meuse. The Latin name for Geleenbeek is Glana, meaning "clear river". The town centre is situated at about 60 m above sea level.

== History ==
Until the end of the 19th century, Geleen was a very small village. Its population was 2,545 in 1899. The remains of one of the oldest prehistoric farms in the Netherlands were found here. In the 20th century the exploitation of coal mines in this area (the state-owned coal mine "Maurits", the biggest in Europe, was located in Geleen) brought a fast population increase. As part of this growth, a new town hall was designed by J.TH.J. Cuypers in 1922. It was built between the older centres of Opgeleen, Krawinkel and Lutterade, as the starting point for a new centre of the mining municipality of Geleen. During the 1960s and 1970s the Dutch coal mines, which were all located in this part of the province, were closed. The state mining company DSM (privatised in 1989) remained active in Geleen, however, now purely as a chemicals producer. In July 2002, part of DSM's petrochemicals business, located on the manufacturing locations in Geleen and Gelsenkirchen (Germany) were acquired by SABIC Europe.

== Sports and events ==
- Fortuna '54 was a football club based in Geleen.
- Geleen has a professional ice hockey team called the Geleen Eaters.
- The handball club Vlug en Lenig is from Geleen.
- The pop and rock festival Pinkpop, the oldest and longest running annual dedicated pop and rock music festival in the world, also has its roots in Geleen. It was held there from 1970 until 1986. This festival was held in the Burgemeester Damen Sportpark, which includes the sports centre Glanerbrook. The nearby swimming pool was popular with the artists, who enjoyed themselves backstage.
- Geleen has an annual town fair, held one week after Whitsun).
- Stage 5 of Eneco Tour of Benelux a road bicycle racing and part of the UCI ProTour finished in Geleen on August 16, 2013.

== Places of interest ==
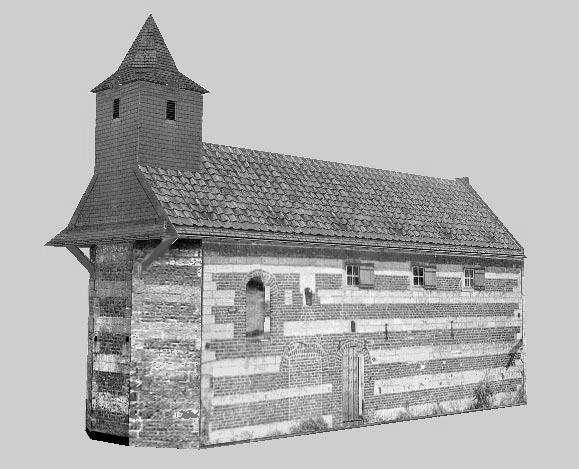
Sint-Janskluis from 1699

- Ruins of Jansgeleen Castle, with restored outer bailey and water mill (Sint-)Jansmolen, to the south-east of Geleen, on the territory of the municipality of Beek.
- Sint-Janskluis, former hermitage from 1699.
- De Biesenhof, recently restored historical farmhouse.
- Parish church of Sint Marcellinus and Petrus in Oud-Geleen. The present church was built in 1862, while its marlstone tower dates from, or possibly dates from, 1504.
- Drossaerdhuis at Geenstraat.
- Monument at Geenstraat (near train station Geleen-Lutterade) in memory of the martyr sister Aloysia, the Jewish-Catholic Louise Löwenfels.
- Main building of Staatsmijn Maurits.
- Restored former brickyard Plinthos, the present office of park De Graven, at Daniken (near train station Geleen-Oost).
- Foroxity cinema: the largest cinema in Limburg.
- Zuyderland Medical Centrum: a fairly recent hospital with modern architecture.
- Burgemeester Damen Sportpark, the location of the Pinkpop Festival from 1970 to 1986.

== Transportation ==
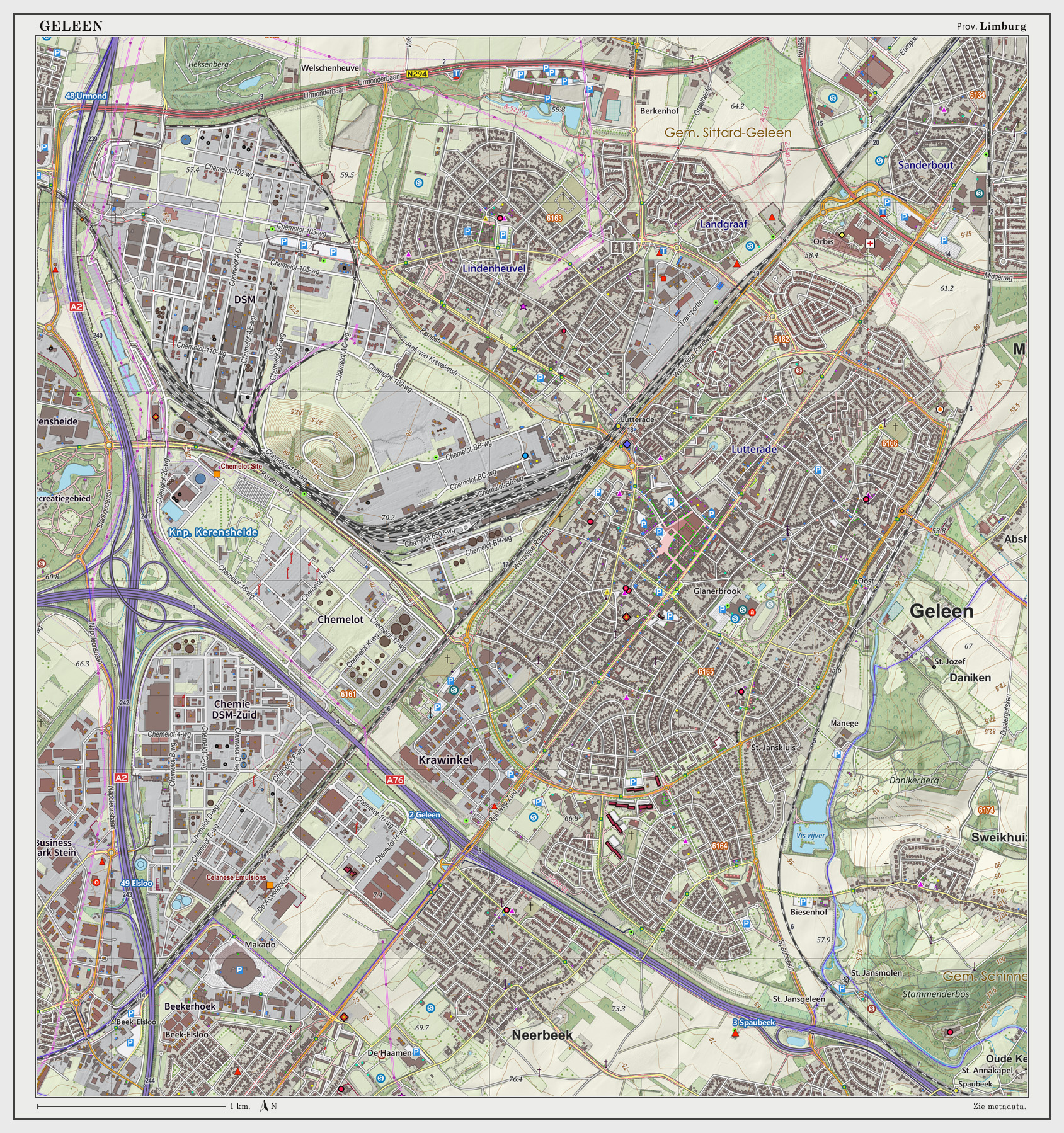
Topographic map of Geleen, March 2014

Geleen is served by two railway stations: Geleen-Lutterade, on the line Sittard-Maastricht, and Geleen Oost, on the line Sittard-Heerlen.

Geleen is also served by two motorways: A2 Amsterdam-Maastricht, exit Urmond, and A76 Antwerp-Aachen, exit Geleen.

== Notable people ==
- Jasper Adams (born 1989), Dutch handball player
- Benjamin van den Broek (born 1987), Dutch-born New Zealand footballer
- Charles of Mount Argus (1821–1893), Dutch Passionist priest and Saint
- Rick Geenen (born 1988), Dutch footballer
- Myrthe Hilkens (born 1979), Dutch journalist, non-fiction writer and politician
- Wil Jacobs (born 1960), Dutch handball player
- Pierre Kerkhoffs (1936–2021), Dutch footballer
- Paul Kusters (born 1966), Dutch cartoonist
- Paul van Loon (born 1955), Dutch children's author
- Dominick Muermans (born 1984), Dutch racing driver
- Jean Nelissen (1936–2010), Dutch sports journalist
- Maartje Paumen (born 1985), Dutch field hockey player
- Gabriëlle Popken (born 1983), Dutch politician
- Roel Rothkrans (born 1979), Dutch handball player
- Ton Raven (born 1957), Dutch politician
- Pim Rietbroek (born 1942), Dutch handball player and coach
- René Shuman (born 1967), Dutch singer
- Inger Smits (born 1994), Dutch handball player
- Jorn Smits (born 1992), Dutch handball player
- Kay Smits (born 1997), Dutch handball player
- Henk Steevens (1931–2020), Dutch cyclist

== Gallery ==
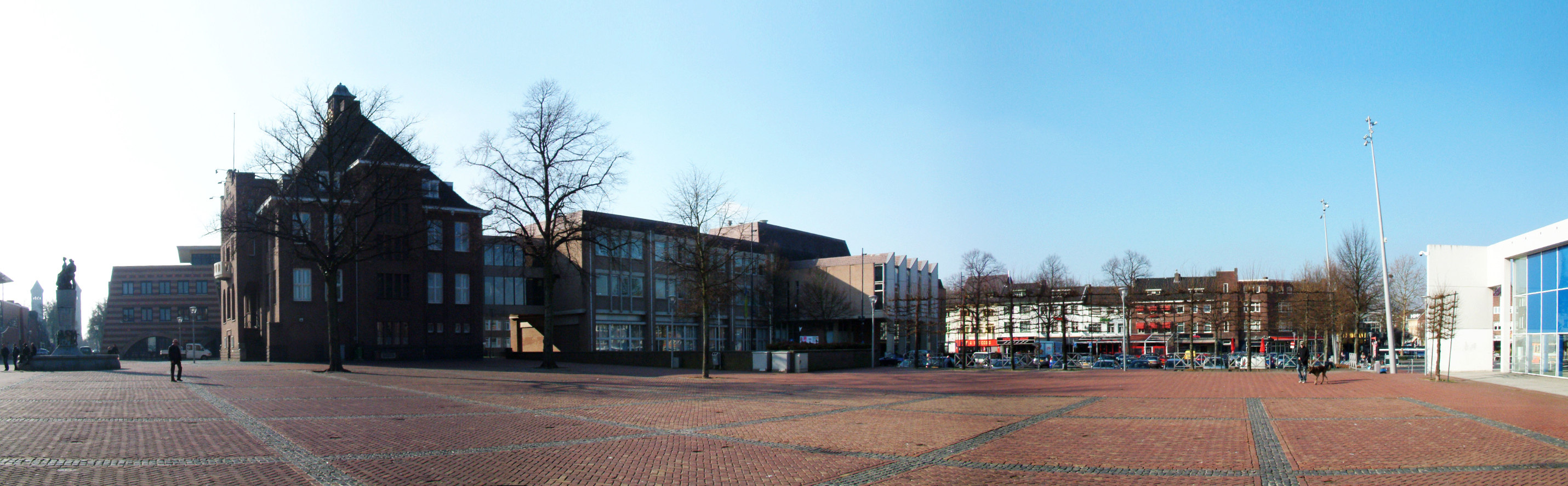
Geleen market

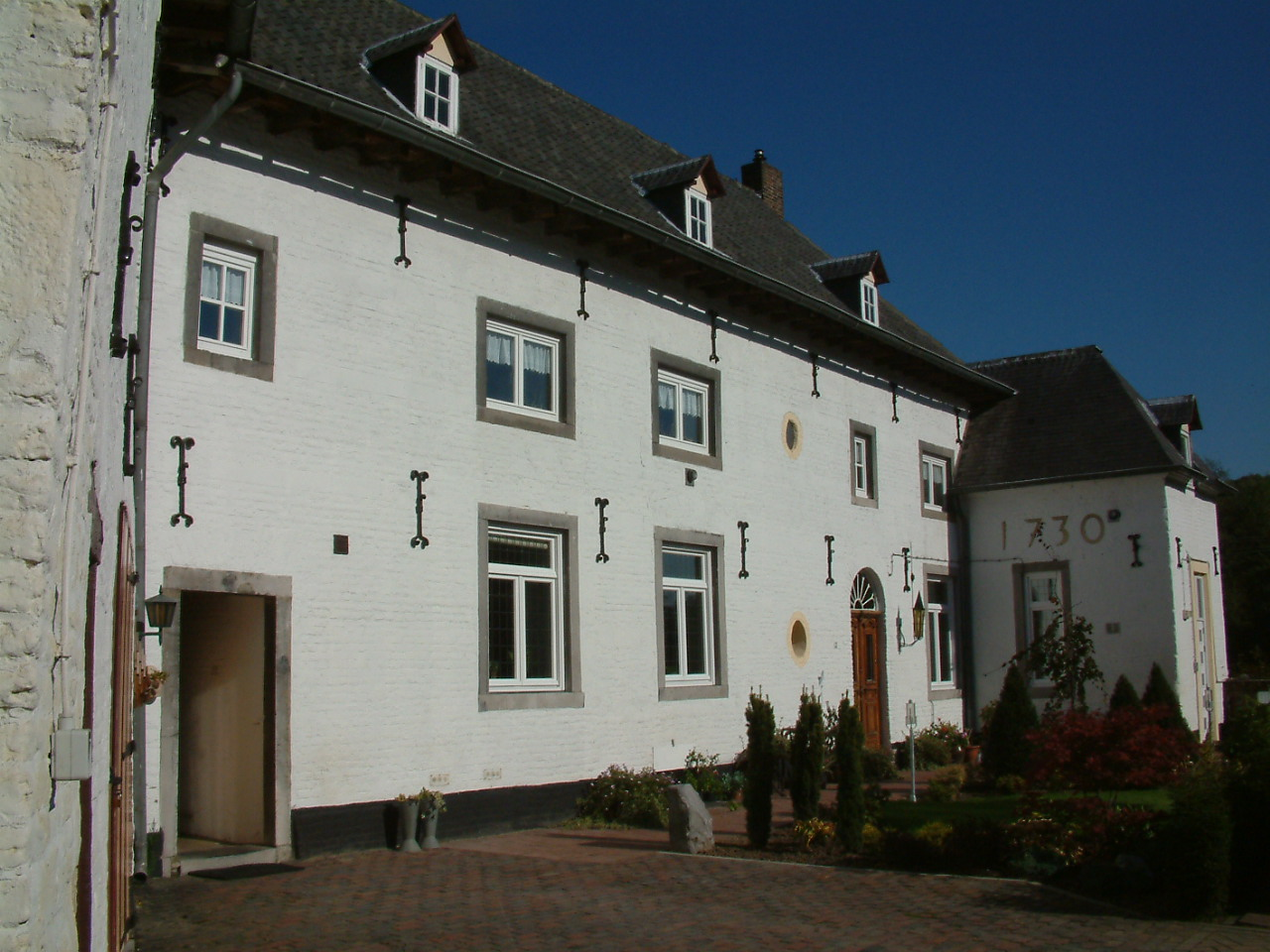
Jansgeleen Castle

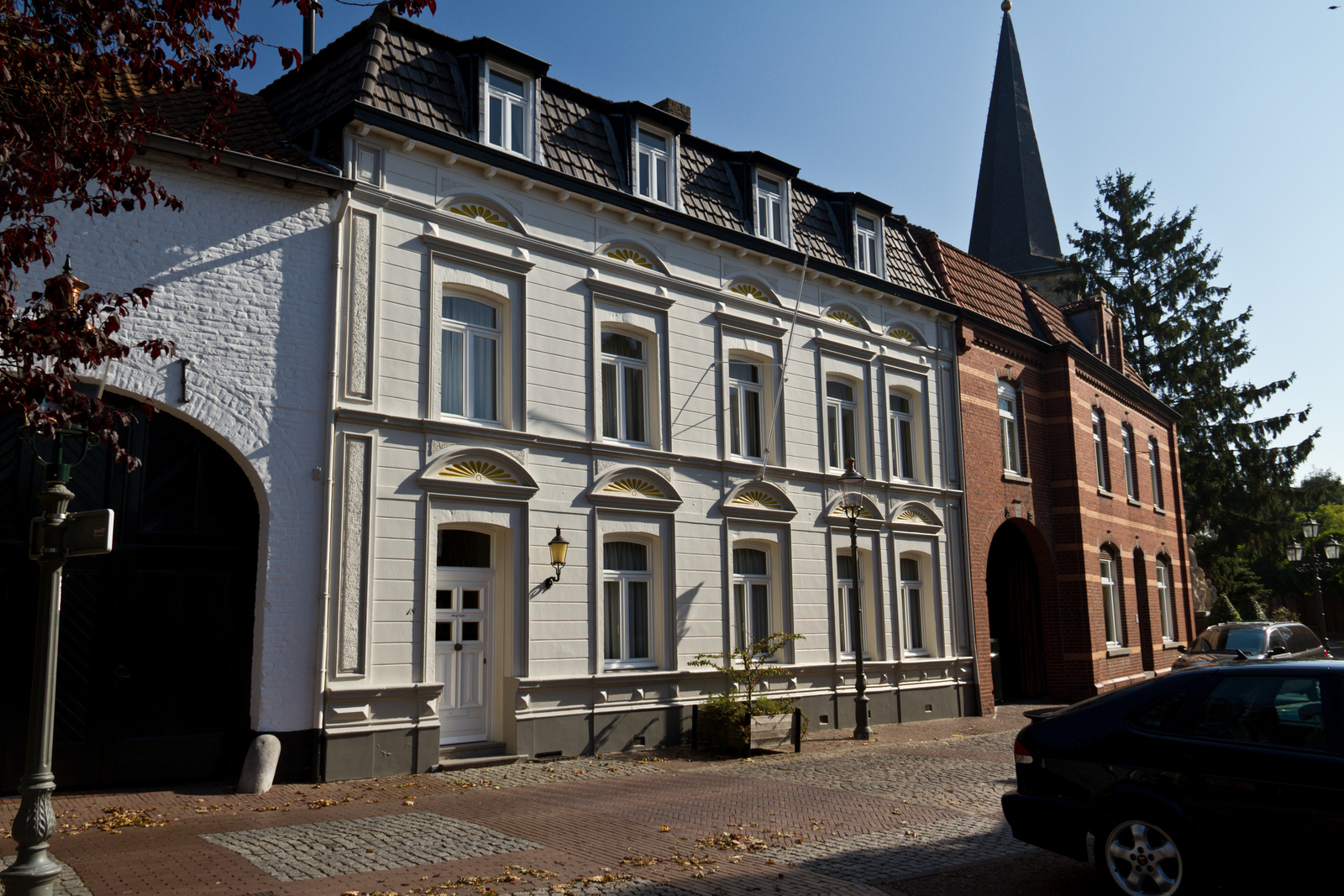
Marcelienstraat in Geleen

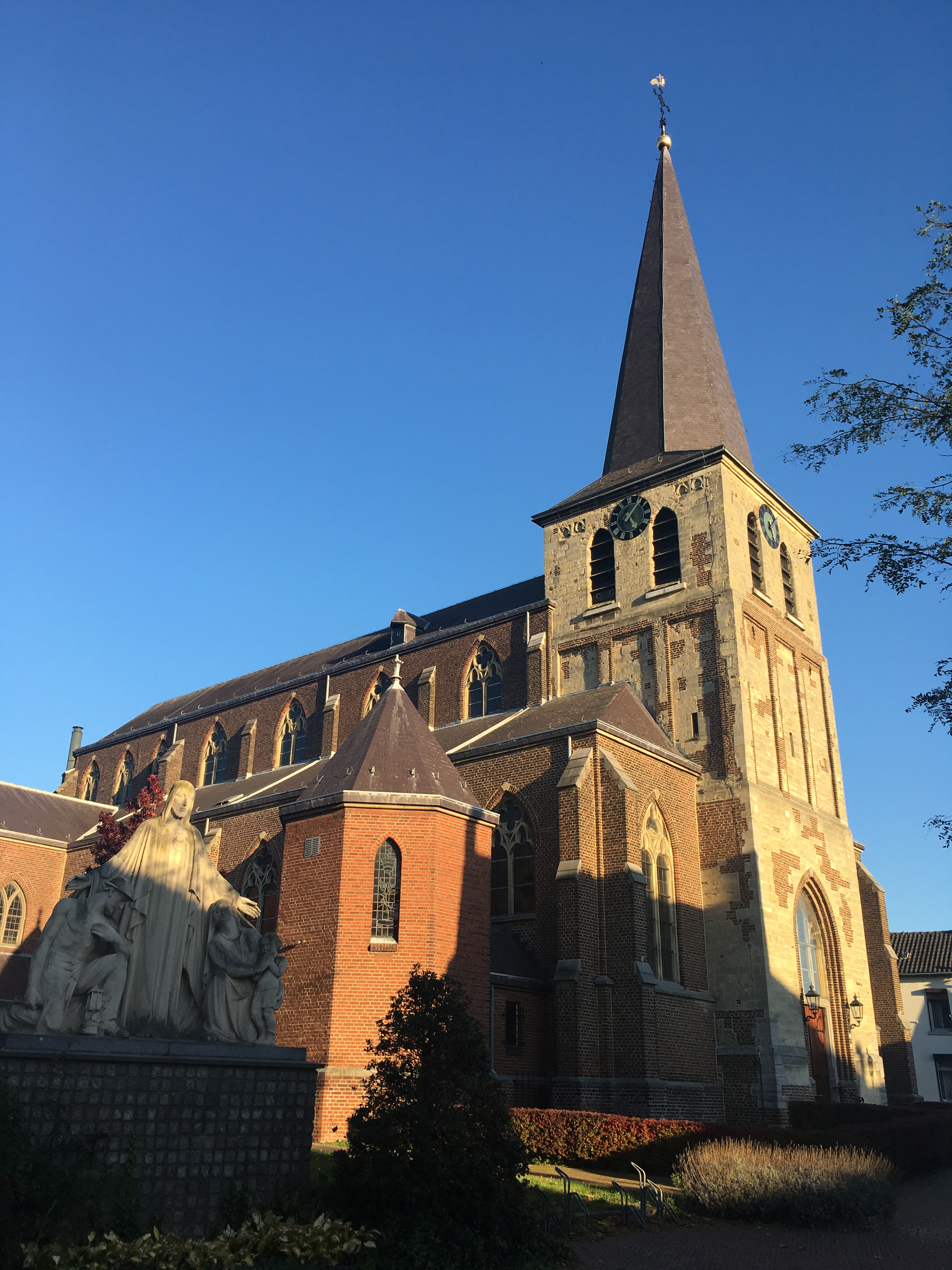
Marcellinus en Petruskerk in Oud-Geleen

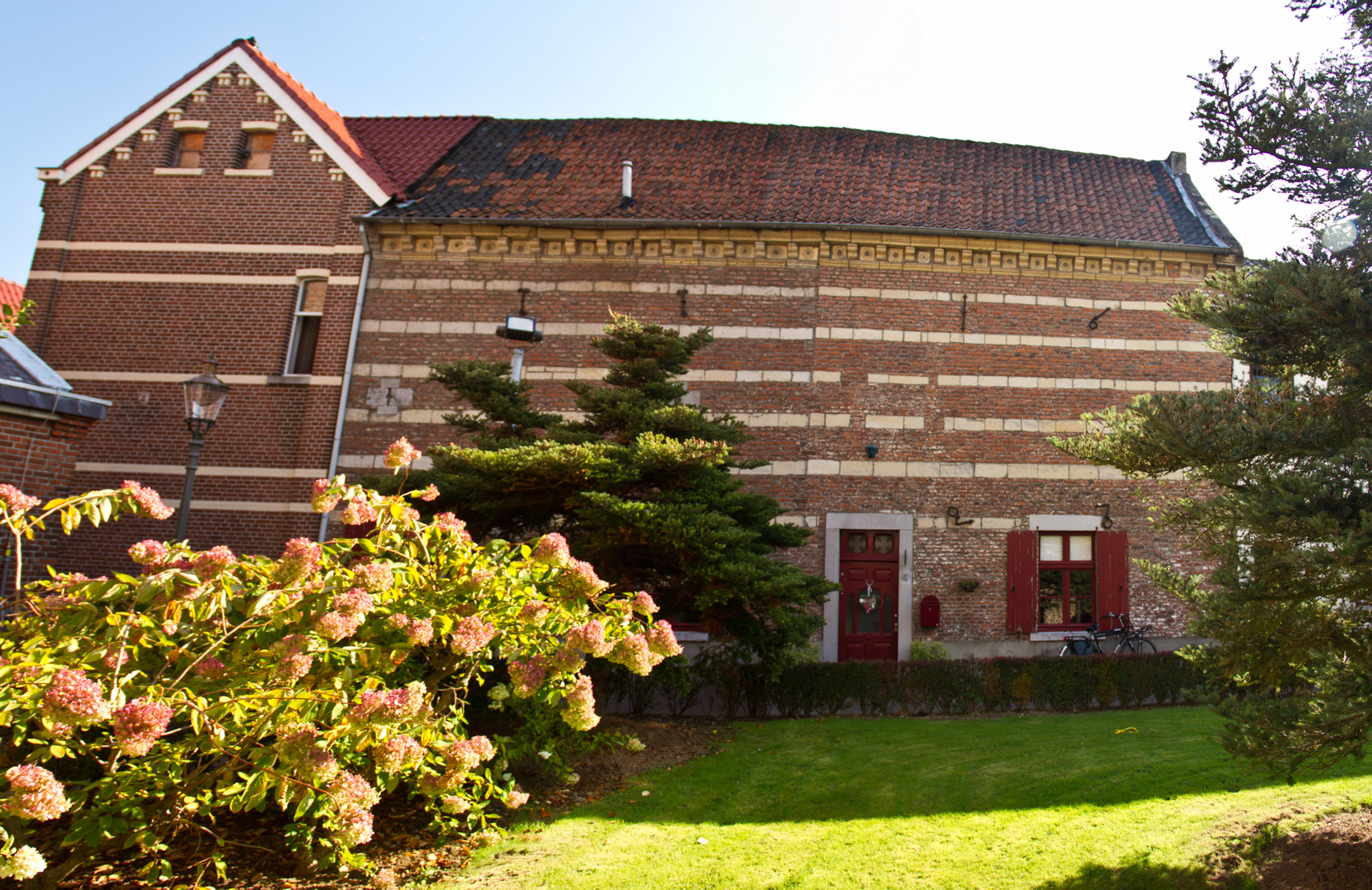
Huis Maes in Geleen

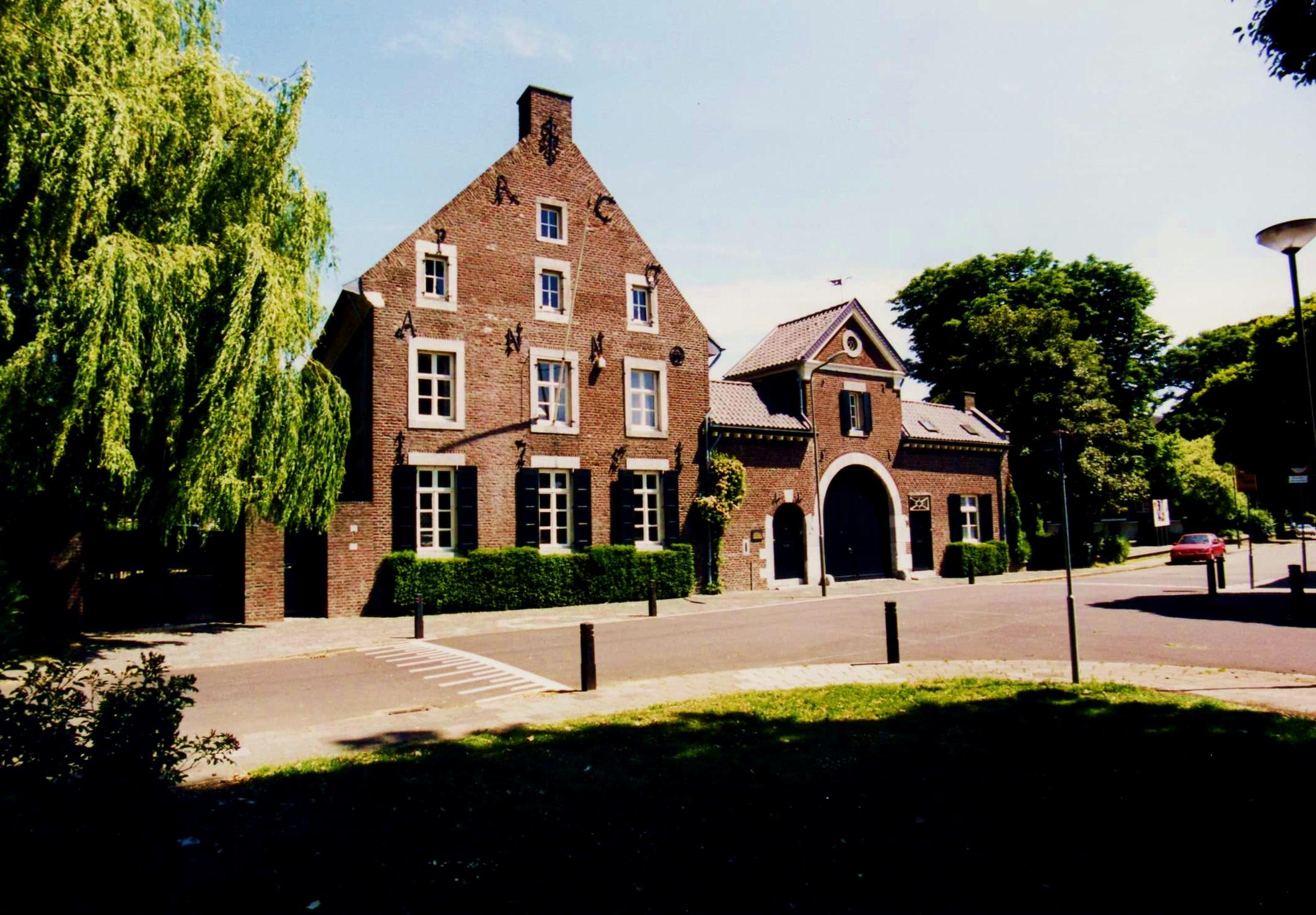
Huis Corten

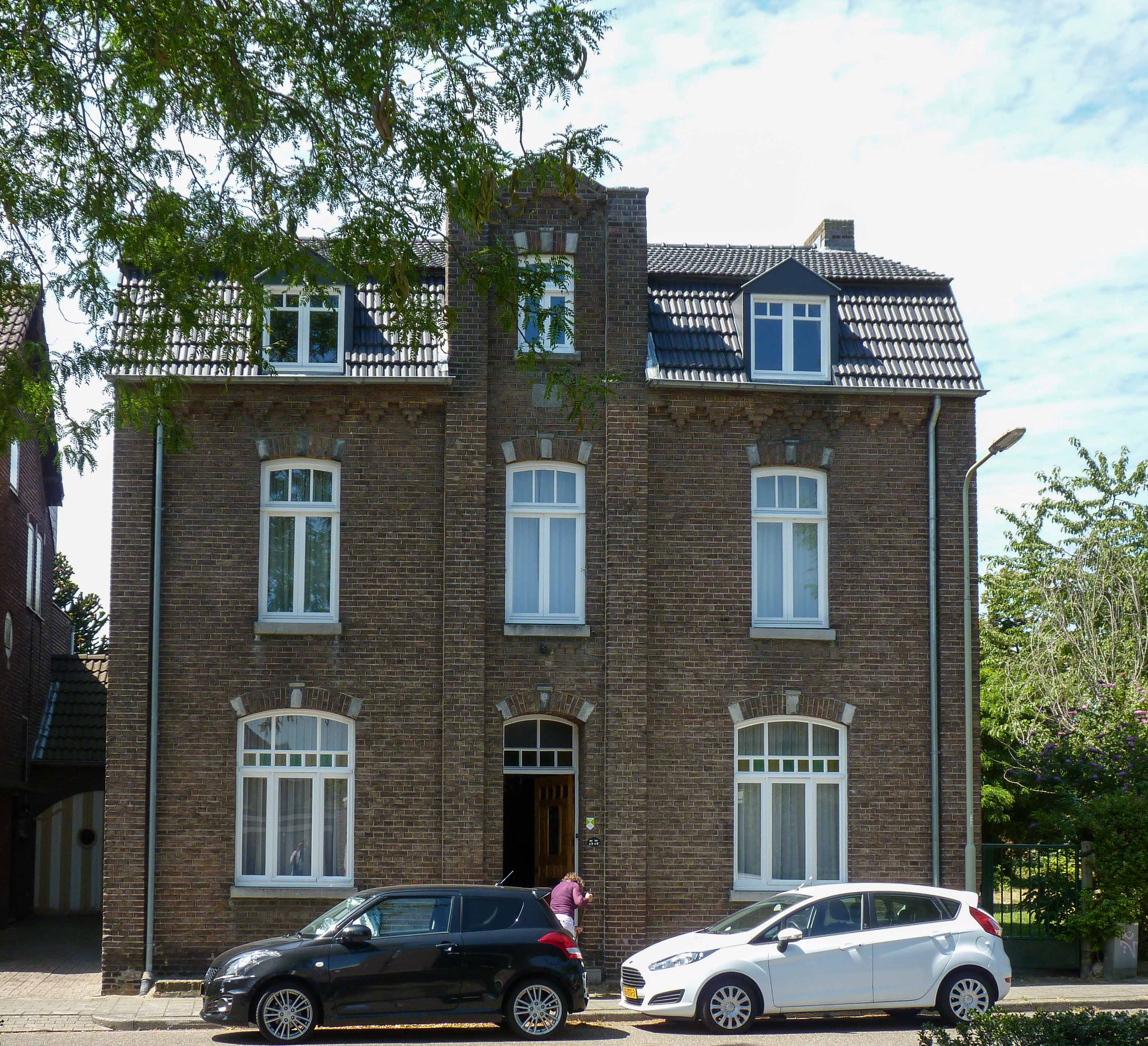
House in Geleen

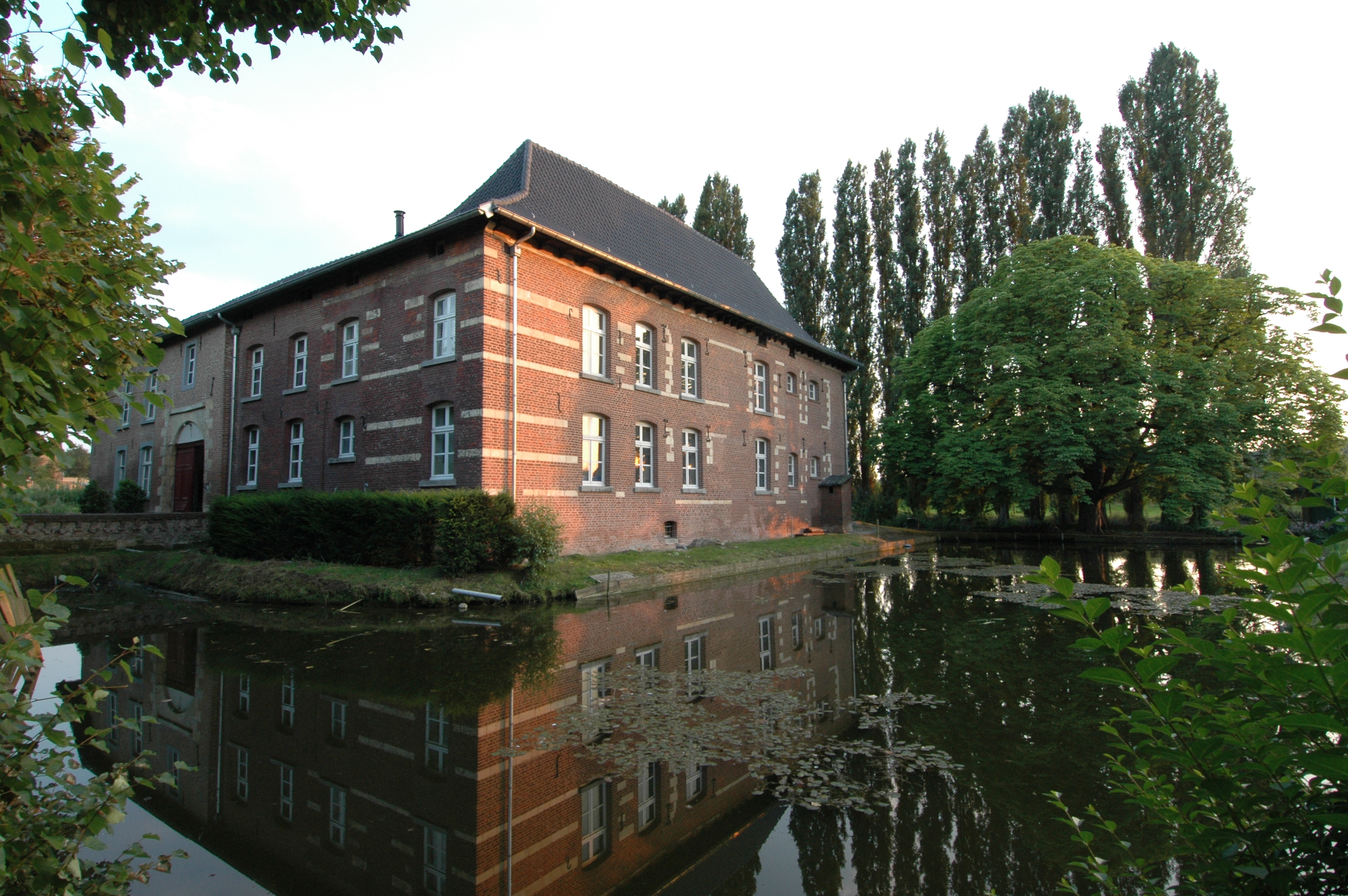
Huis ten Dijcken

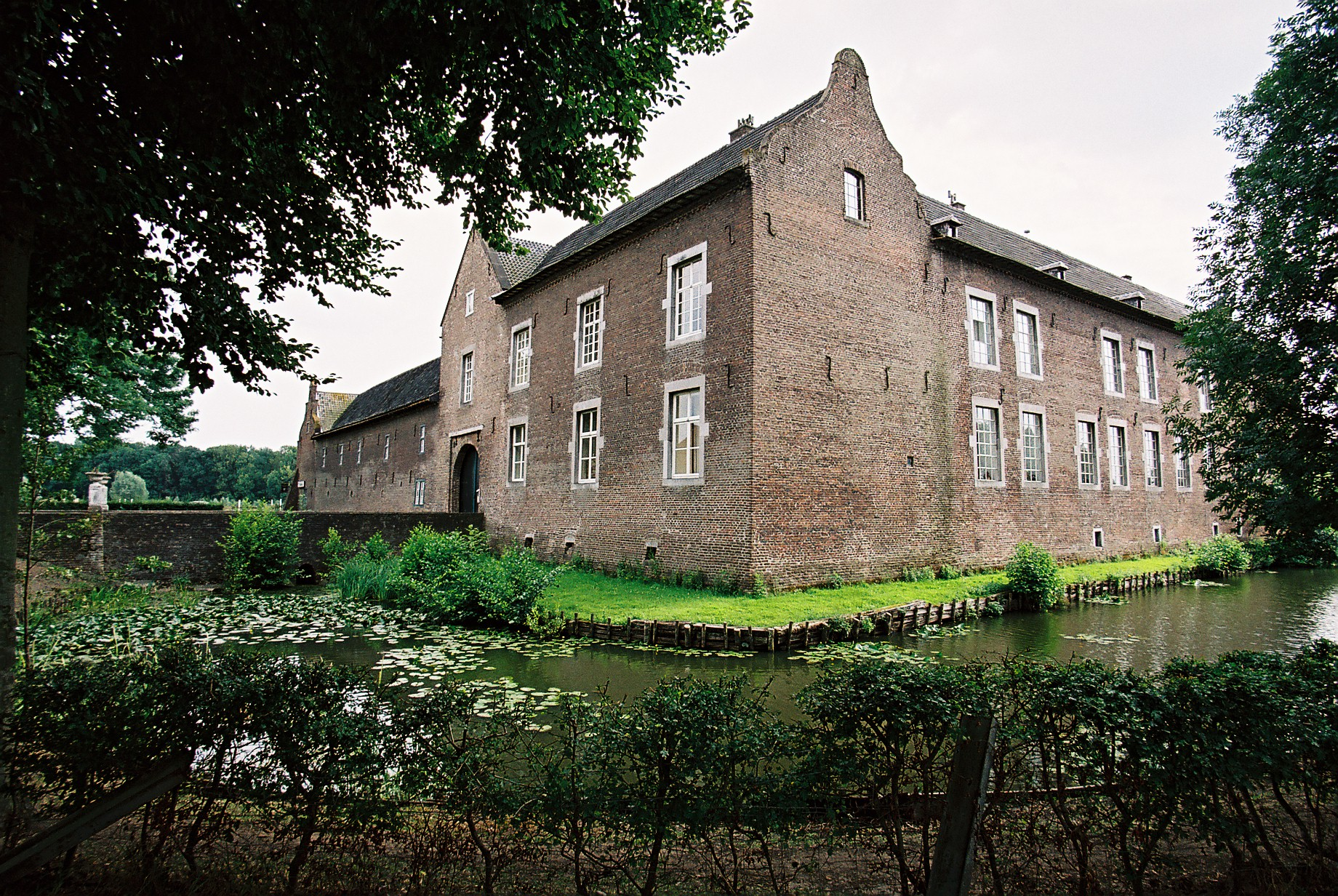
Kasteel Terborgh

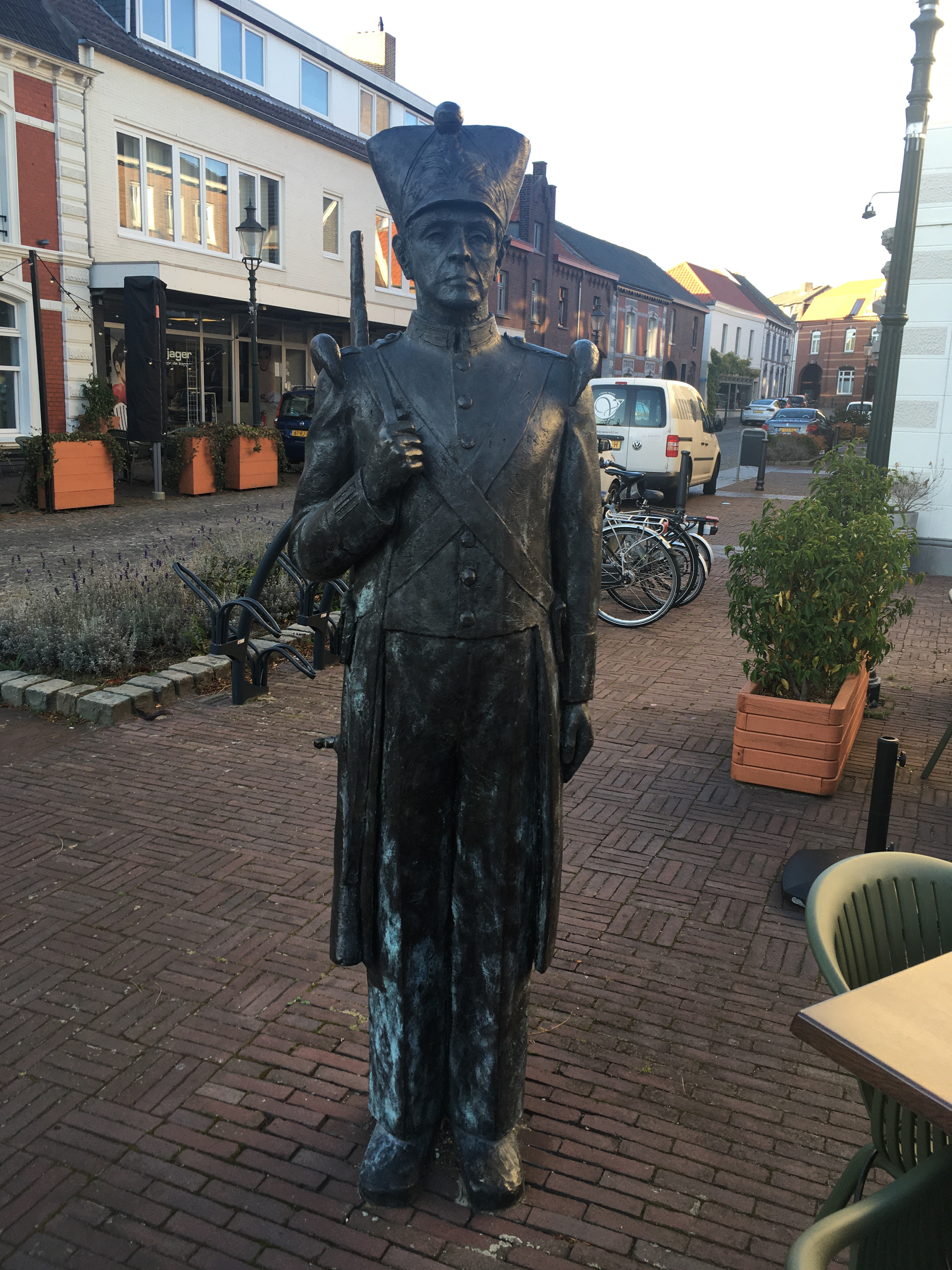
Sculpture De Sjöt
