= Burgemeester Damen Sportpark =

Burgemeester Damen Sportpark is a park located in Geleen, Netherlands. It was the location of the Pinkpop Festival from 1970 to 1986.
