= Truce of Ulm (1647) =

War treaty

The Truce of Ulm (German: Waffenstillstand von Ulm) (also known as the Treaty of Ulm) was signed in Ulm on 14 March 1647 between France, Sweden, and Bavaria. This truce was developed after France and Sweden invaded Bavaria during the Thirty Years' War. Both invading nations forced Maximilian I, Elector of Bavaria, to conclude the truce and renounce his alliance with Emperor Ferdinand III. However, Maximilian broke the truce on 14 September and returned to his alliance with Ferdinand.
