= Dennis Dengering =

Dutch professional football player

Personal information
- Full name: Dennis Dengering
- Date of birth: 6 March 1993 (age 33)
- Place of birth: Spaubeek, Netherlands
- Height: 1.79 m (5 ft 10 in)
- Position: Right back

Team information
- Current team: EHC Hoensbroek

Youth career
- VV Spaubeek
- 2013–: PSV

Senior career*
Years	Team	Apps	(Gls)
2013–2014	PSV	0	(0)
2013–2014	→ Jong PSV	17	(0)
2014–2016	Fortuna Sittard	45	(0)
2016–2020	EHC	44	(0)
2020–2021	VV Spaubeek		
2021–2022	EHC		
2022–	VV Spaubeek		

International career^{‡}
2008-2009	Netherlands U-16	5	(0)
2009	Netherlands U-17	1	(0)
2011	Netherlands U-18	3	(0)
- * Club domestic league appearances and goals as of 6 June 2016 ‡ National team caps and goals as of 23 September 2013

Dennis Dengering (born 6 March 1993) is a Dutch professional football player who last played as a right back for Fortuna Sittard in the Dutch Eerste Divisie.

== Club career ==
He made his professional debut as Jong PSV player in the second division on 24 August 2013 against De Graafschap in a 3–0 away defeat. He entered the field as a half-time substitute for Burak Kardeş. After his contract had expired mid 2014, Dengering signed a one-year deal with Eerste Divisie side Fortuna Sittard.

He was released in summer 2016 and joined amateur side EHC Hoensbroek. He later returned to childhood club Spaubeek.

== International career ==
Dengering played 5 games for the Netherlands national under-16 football team.
