= Bavarian campaign (1646–1647) =

Franco–Swedish campaign into Bavaria

- Part of the Thirty Years' War
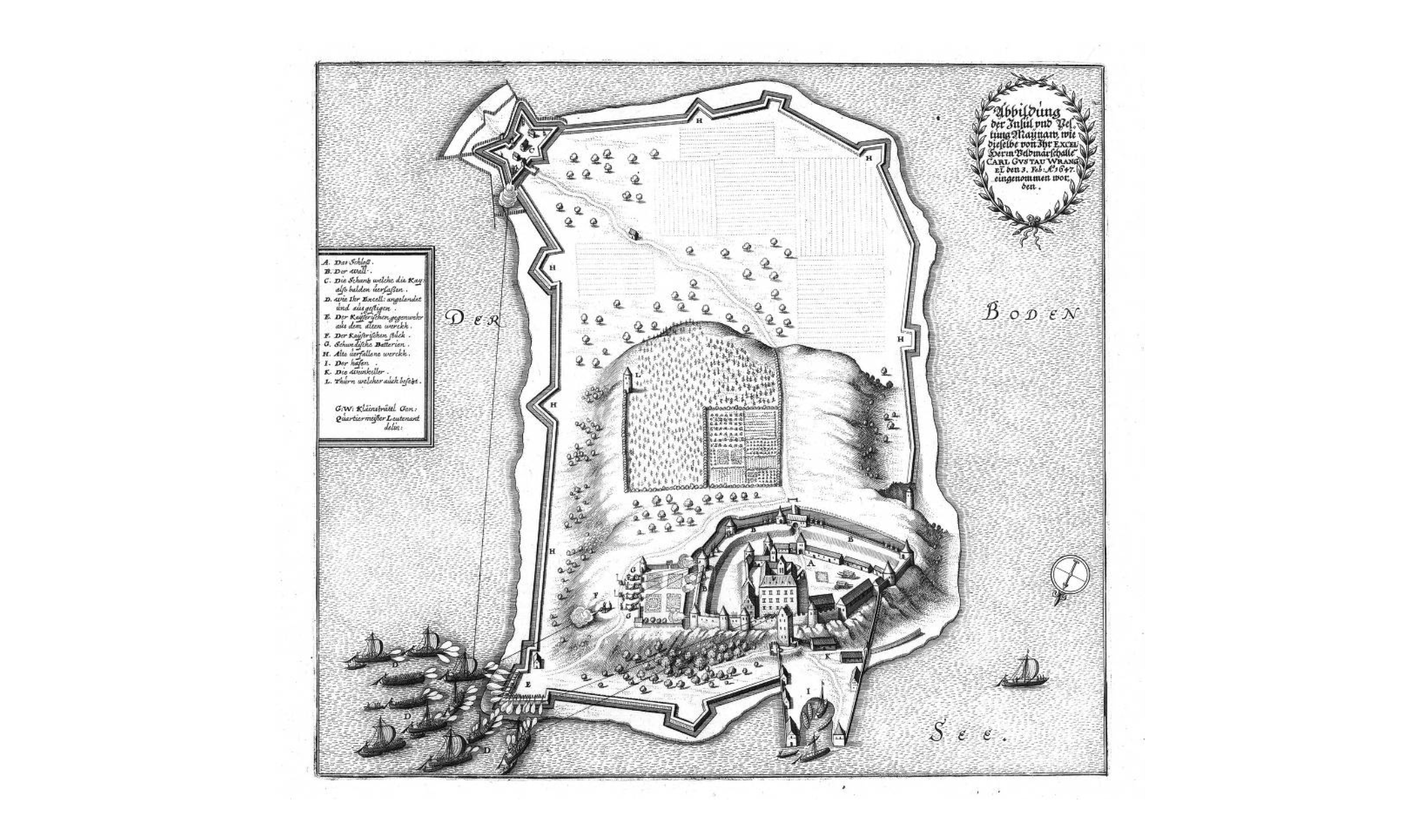
- Fortress of Mainau is captured by the Swedes in 1647
Date	October 1646 – 1647
Location	Bavaria
Result	Franco-Swedish victory, Truce of Ulm (1647)
Territorial changes	Large swathes of Bavaria are occupied

Belligerents
Swedish Empire (Kingdom of France) France	Holy Roman Empire; (Electorate of Bavaria) Bavaria

Commanders and leaders
(Swedish Empire) Carl Gustaf Wrangel (Kingdom of France) Turenne	(Holy Roman Empire) Leopold William (Electorate of Bavaria) Huyn von Geleen

Units involved
(Swedish Empire) Swedish Lake Constance fleet	(Electorate of Bavaria) Rain-am-Lech garrison (Electorate of Bavaria) Augsburg garrison (Electorate of Bavaria) Bregenz garrison (Electorate of Bavaria) Lindau garrison (Holy Roman Empire) Tyroleon force

Strength
(Swedish Empire) 15,000 infantry 8,000 cavalry 24 guns (Kingdom of France) Unknown	(Holy Roman Empire) 30,000 men (Electorate of Bavaria) 6,900 men (field army)

Casualties and losses
Unknown	13 ships captured

The Bavarian campaign (Swedish: Bayerska fälttåget; French: Campagne de Bavière) was a Franco–Swedish campaign into Bavaria in 1646 to 1647 in an attempt to remove Bavaria as an active belligerent in the ongoing Thirty Years' War.

== Background ==
In 1645, Sweden was unable to take Emperor Ferdinand III out of the war despite a distinct victory over the Imperial army at Jankau in Bohemia and a following invasion into the Emperor's hereditary lands. In January 1646, the Imperial Generalissimo Leopold William drove the Swedes entirely out of Bohemia with the help of Bavarian troops. Therefore, the Swedish command decided to unite their forces with France to attack Bavaria together as the most important of Ferdinand's remaining allies within the Empire.

In April 1646, Carl Gustaf Wrangel, the appointed successor of Lennart Torstensson as overall commander of all Swedish forces in Germany, marched into Westphalia to get closer to the French army. Torstensson had been allowed to return home, but not to retire, as several senior leaders along with Axel Oxenstierna and the Queen regularly spoke to him about German affairs. The Swedish army captured Höxter and Paderborn which they gave to their ally Hesse-Kassel. Then they moved with 15,000 infantry and 8,000 cavalry into the Landgraviate to wait for Turenne.

While Wrangel waited for the French to arrive, his position was imperiled by an approaching Imperial army of 30,000 men. At the end of June, Leopold William's Imperials supported by 6,900 Bavarians under Gottfried Huyn von Geleen set up camp at Homberg (Ohm) with the intention of preventing the conjunction of Sweden and France. Instead of risking battle, Wrangel decided to entrench his troops at Kirchhain where he received reinforcements by Hans Christoff von Königsmarck. Seeing this, the Imperial troops did not risk to storm the Swedish position and pulled back in late July when an epidemic began to rage among their horses.

== Campaign ==
On 10 August, the French and Swedish armies united undisturbed at Wetzlar. They then began their march towards Bavaria, which Wrangel had orders to thoroughly ravage, in order to force Bavaria to cease hostilities. The Imperial-Bavarian army tried to stop them with entrenchments along the Main and Nidda rivers but the Swedes and French simply bypassed the defences and moved on to the Danube via Heilbronn. Leopold William was forced to follow them on a safe road through Franconia, leaving western Bavaria defenceless.

The Franco–Swedish cooperation suffered some difficulties, but it was mostly solved by Wrangel and Turenne agreeing that they would command the united army on alternating weeks. They first took Rain-am-Lech in early October. Wrangel hoped that Augsburg would surrender to him, as they had previously surrendered to Gustavus Adolphus several years prior. However, Augsburg refused to surrender to either Wrangel or Turenne, who both had separately approached the town. Because of the refusal, the united army was forced to besiege the city. However, with news of an approaching Imperial army under the command of the Archduke Leopold William reaching both Wrangel and Turenne, they quickly decided to abandon the siege after a failed storm.

The allies pulled back into Swabia, being chased by the Imperial army. After some manoeuvers, the allies had managed to get away from the Imperials and once more invaded Bavaria, which had become defenseless. The countryside was completely destroyed all the way to Munich.

Wrangel wished to take up winter quarters deep in Bavaria, but the Frenchmen now refused to continue the campaign. Unfortunately for the Swedes, news later arrived that France had made a truce with the Bavarians, which meant that Turenne was no longer allowed to move further into Bavaria. This is due to the French concluding that the joint operation had the risk of making Sweden too powerful.

Fearing a peasants' revolt more than the Swedish army, Maximillian of Bavaria refused to arm his subjects, instead ordering a scorched earth policy which included the destruction of mills and storehouses to starve the Swedes, and coincidentally, his own subjects.

Turenne and the French army would then depart and establish winter quarters around Donau in Swabia, with Wrangel going to the lands around Lake Constance on the Swiss border, whose countryside had not been plundered yet.

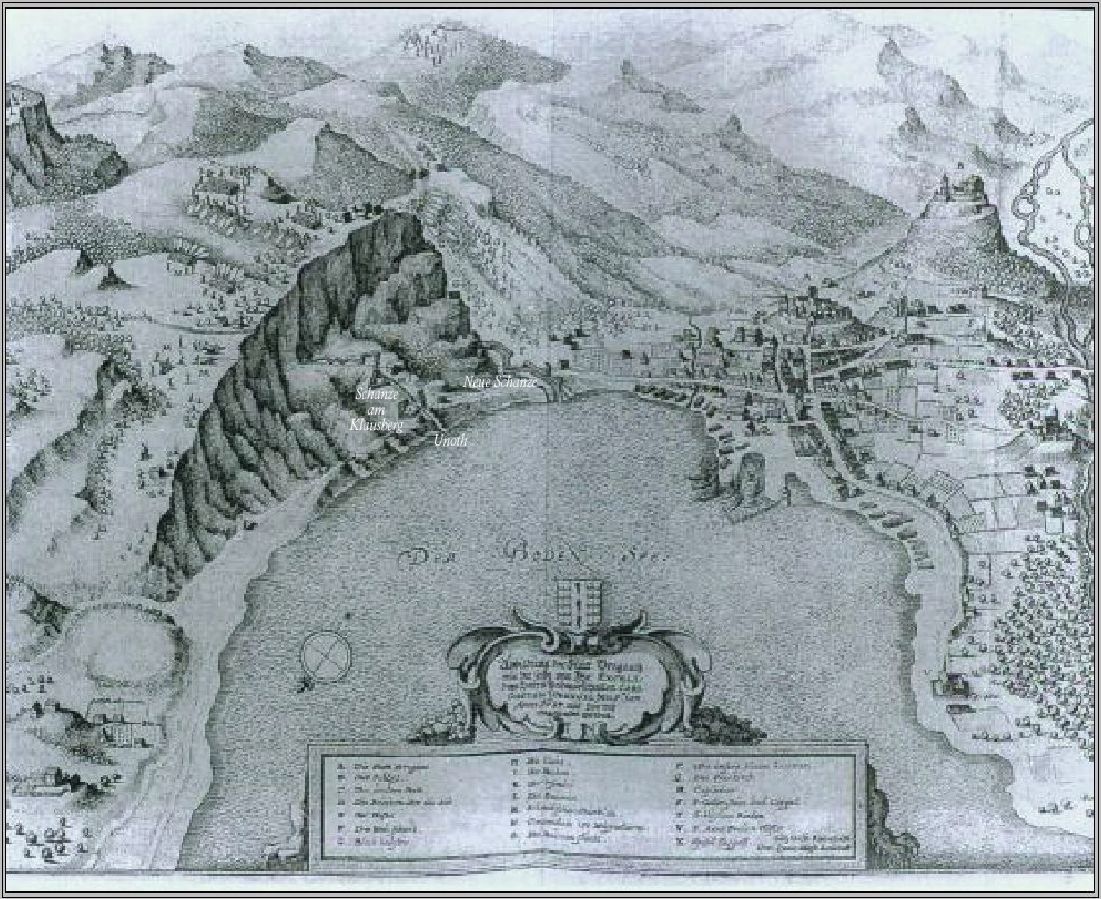
Illustration of the storming of Bregenz by the Swedes under Carl Gustav Wrangel

=== Attack on Bregenz ===
Swedish patrols had told Wrangel about the vulnerability of the city of Bregenz at the eastern end of the lake where the surrounding population had put their valuables. On January 4, Wrangel appeared outside of the pass with 8,000 men and 24 guns. The defile by the lake shore was the only viable route over the forest along the Tyrolean border. This route was blocked by three fortified gates, along with a line of palisades up towards the hillside to the east. It was maned by 2,200 Tyrolean soldiers and militia who had been shivering at their posts during heavy snowfall. The defenders kept the Swedes back until a Swedish detachment went along a mountain path and overran the palisades, turning the positions along the roads. In a panic, the defenders joined the civilian population and began fleeing.

The city fell to the Swedes, who destroyed all of the fortifications until March. The plunder taken from the city was very rich, amounting to 40 barrels of gold. The amount taken was also "more than the Swedish army had taken before." The reason for there being so many valuables is mainly because many nobles and bishops throughout upper Swabia had sought refuge in the city and took their valuables with them. Wrangel would then claim the title "Admiral of Lake Constance" which was likely a mocking retaliation for the appointment of Wallenstein as "General of the Oceanic and Baltic Seas" in 1628. However, there was some substance to the title, as Wrangel had captured 13 ships that were stationed in Bregenz, which he rearmed for operations on the Lake Constance.

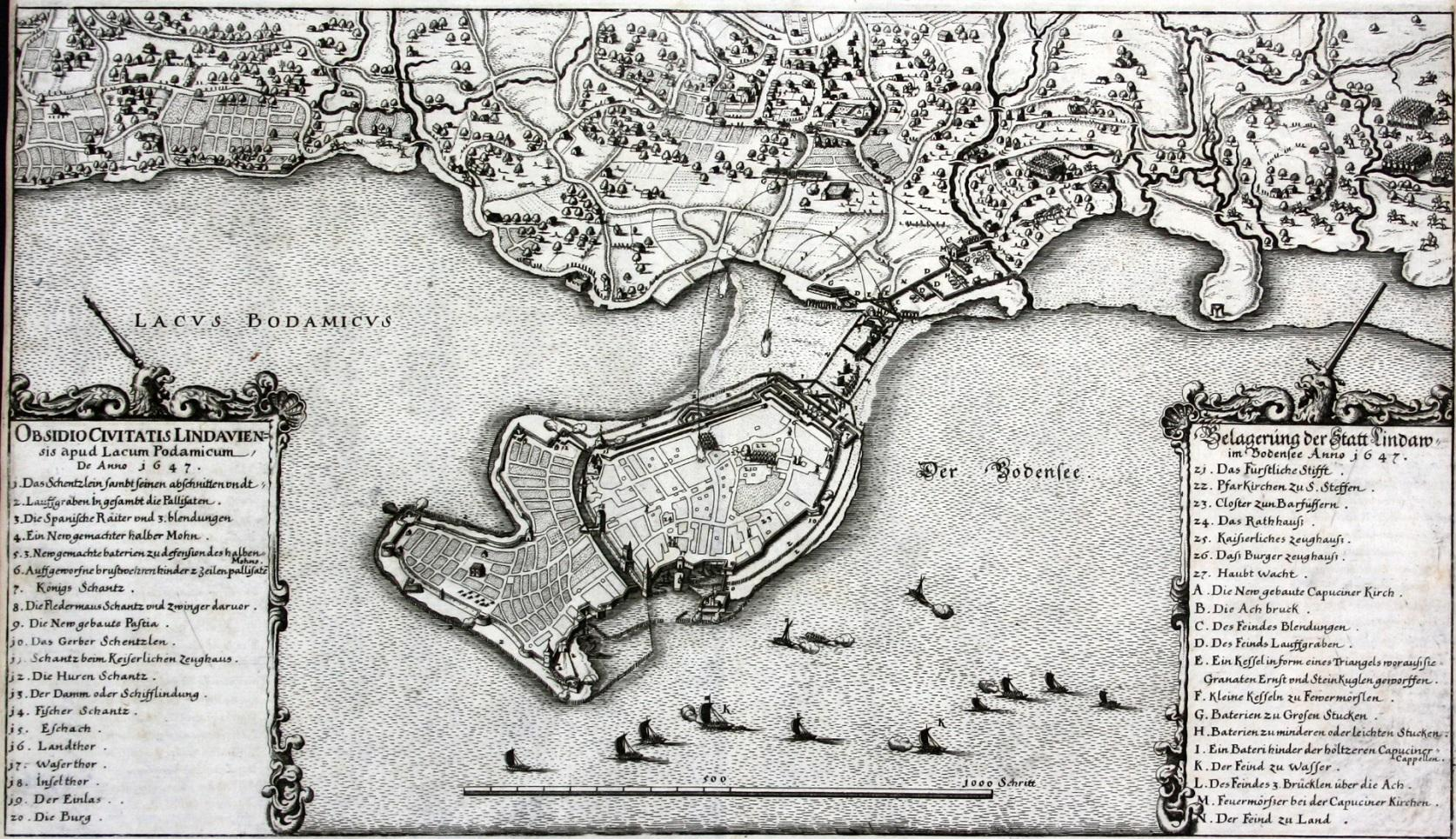
Siege of the town of Lindaw in Lake Constance in 1647 by Matthäus Merian

With this new fleet, Wrangel managed to capture the island of Mainau in February 1647. He also attempted, but ultimately failed, to capture Lindau. In opposition to the Swedish fleet on Lake Constance, Imperial vessels also sailed in it, actively engaging in fighting with the Swedes throughout 1647.

== Aftermath ==
In spring of 1647, Maximilian of Bavaria asked for a truce, and in March he signed together with the Elector of Cologne, the Truce of Ulm between him and Sweden, France, and Hesse–Kessel. Wrangel and Turenne would then suspend their operations in Bavaria.

== Works cited ==
- Essen, Michael (2020). The Lion from the North: Volume 2, The Swedish Army during the Thirty Years War 1632-48. Helion & Company. pp. 137–138. ISBN 978-1913118839.
- Lahrkamp, Helmut (1962). Jan von Werth. Sein Leben nach archivalischen Quellenzeugnissen (in German). Cologne: Verlag der Löwe.
- Rebitsch, Robert; Öhman, Jenny; Kilián, Jan (2018). "Die kaiserliche Armee von Jankau bis Zusmarshausen". 1648: Kriegsführung und Friedensverhandlungen (in German). Innsbruck University Press. ISBN 978-3-903187-13-9.
- Sundberg, Ulf (1998). Svenska krig 1521-1814 [Swedish wars 1521-1814] (in Swedish). Hjalmarson & Högberg. p. 184. ISBN 9789189660106.
