= Urmond =

- Village
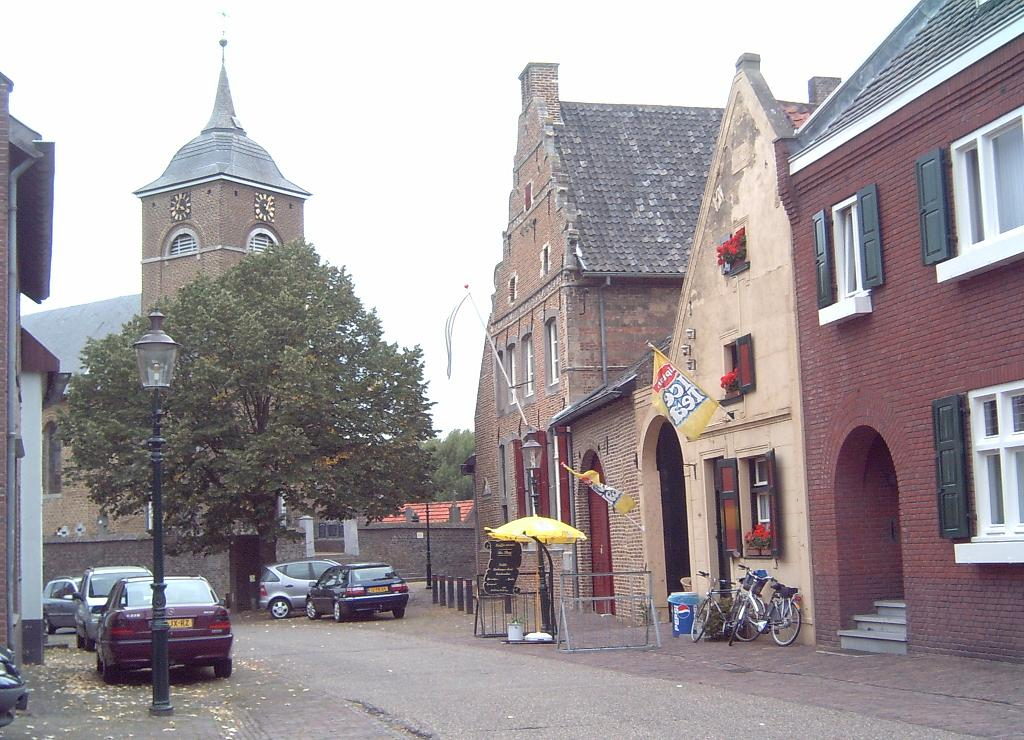
- Centre of Urmond

- Flag

- Location in the Netherlands Location in the province of Limburg in the Netherlands
- Coordinates: 50°59′26″N 5°46′16″E
- Country: Netherlands
- Province: Limburg
- Municipality: Stein

Area
  - Total: 2.87 km^{2} (1.11 sq mi)
- Elevation: 46 m (151 ft)

Population (2021)
  - Total: 3,555
  - Density: 1,240/km^{2} (3,210/sq mi)
- Time zone: UTC+1 (CET)
  - Summer (DST): UTC+2 (CEST)
- Postal code: 6129
- Dialing code: 046

Urmond is a village in the Dutch province of Limburg. It is located in the municipality of Stein.

The village was first mentioned in 1153 as Ouermunte. The current name means "mouth of the Ur", however the Ur has later moved to village. Urmond developed on the higher bank of the Maas. In 1400, it became part of the Duchy of Jülich.

The Old St Martinus Church was built between 1791 and 1793. The medieval tower was placed in 1841. The cemetery is artificially heightened. In 1695, a Dutch Reformed church was built in Urmond which is exceptional in Limburg.

Urmond was home to 600 people in 1840. Urmond was a separate municipality until 1982, when it was merged with Stein.

== Gallery ==
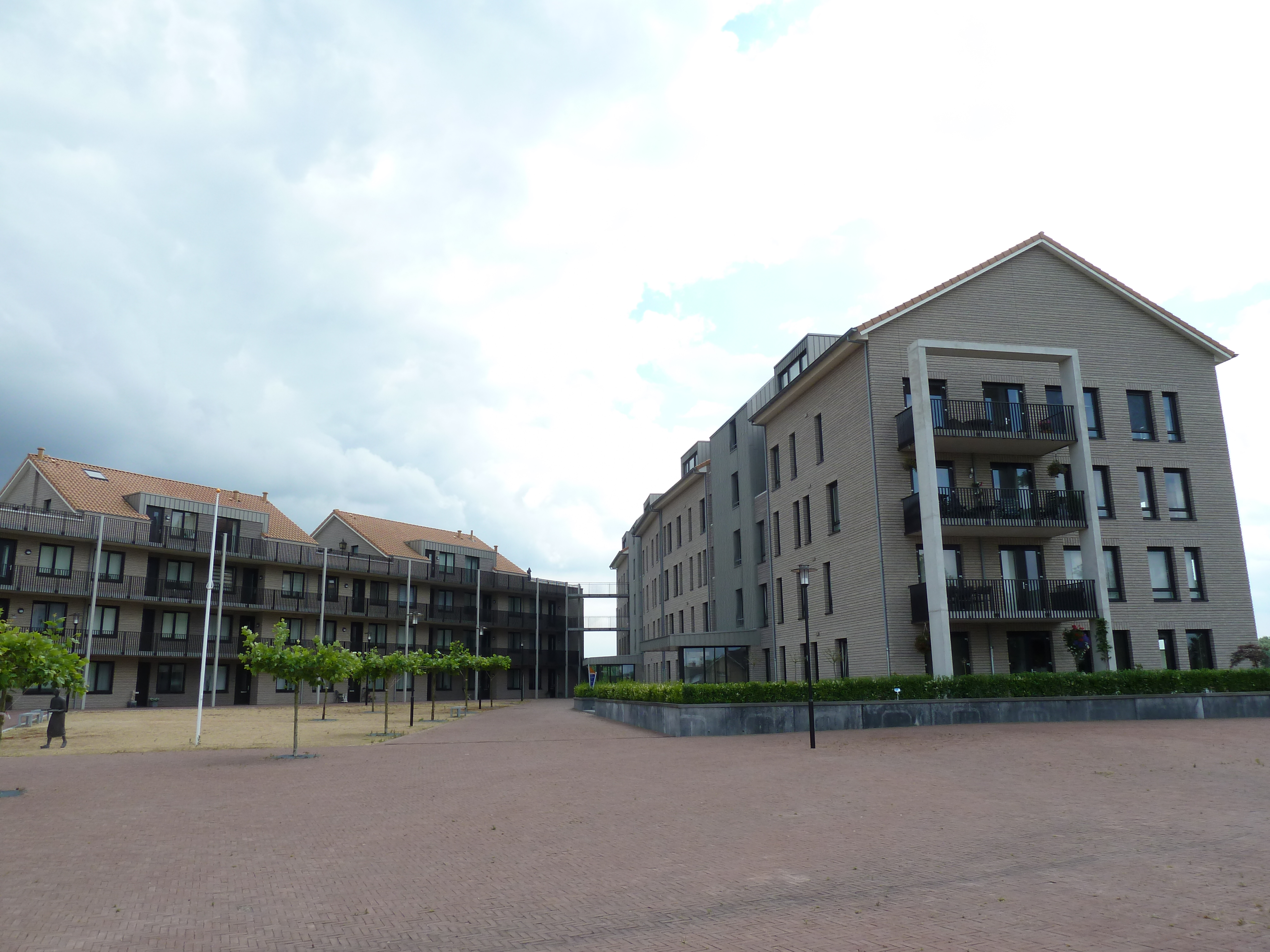
Apartment buildings

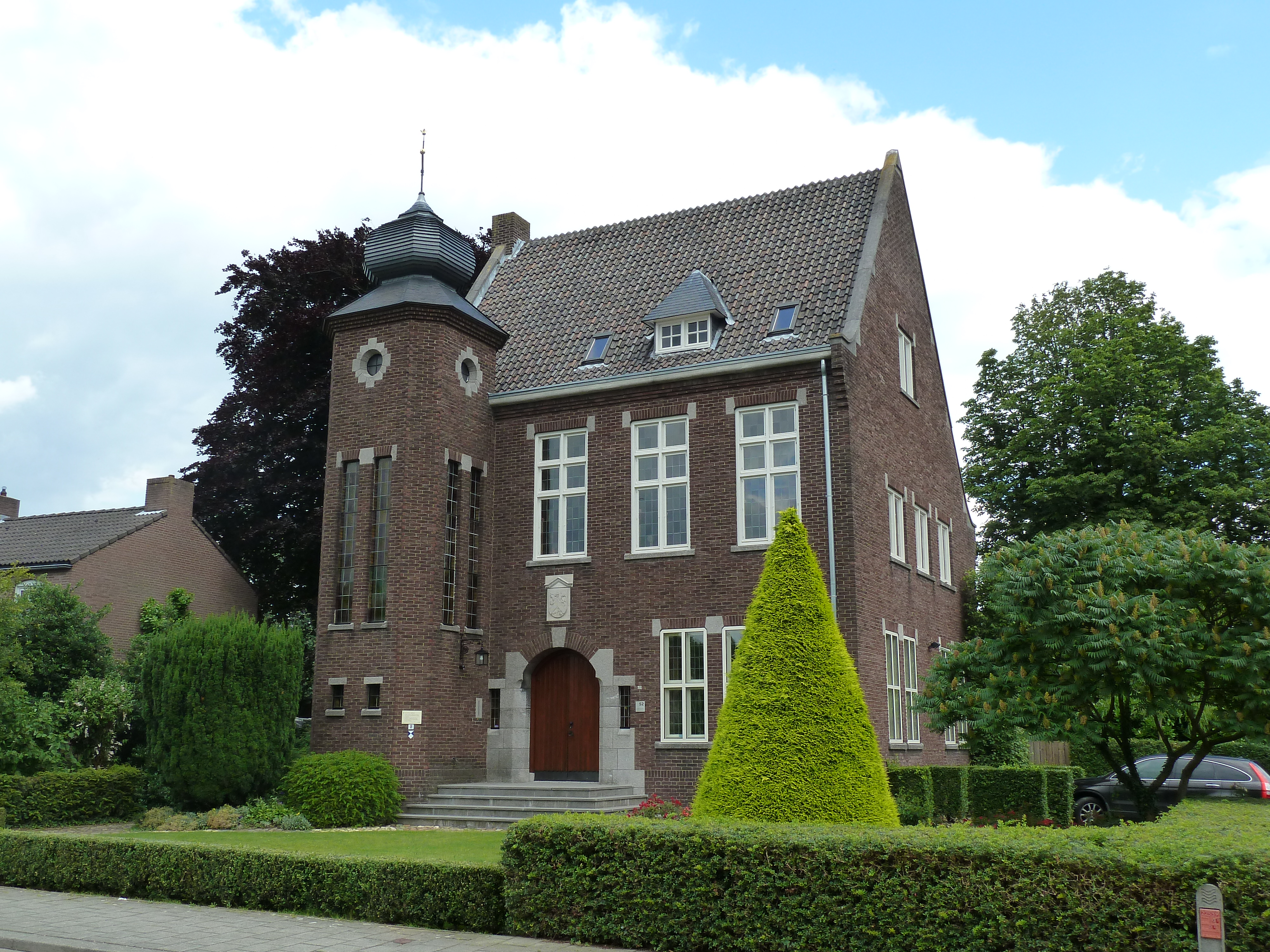
Former town hall

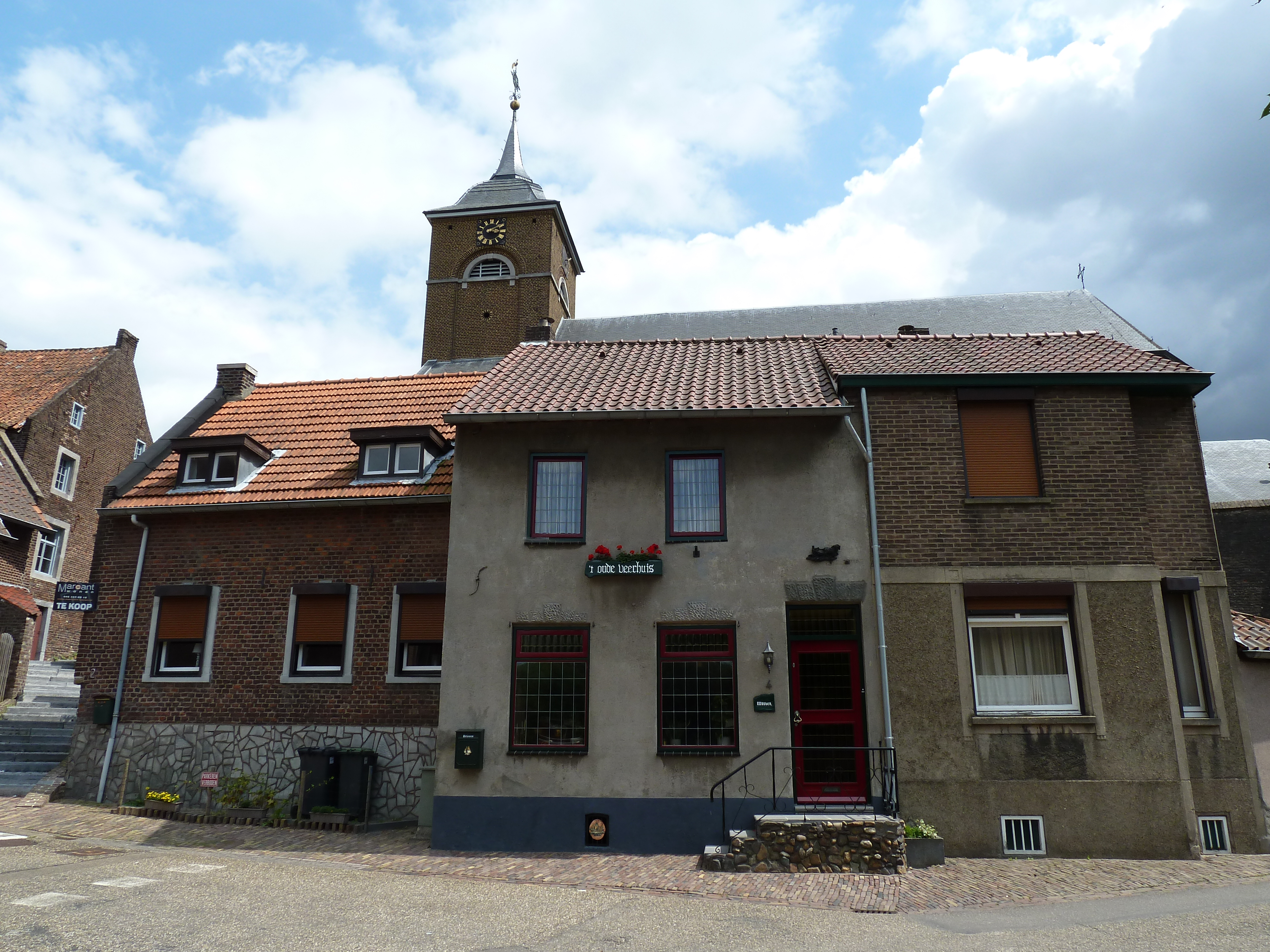
Street view

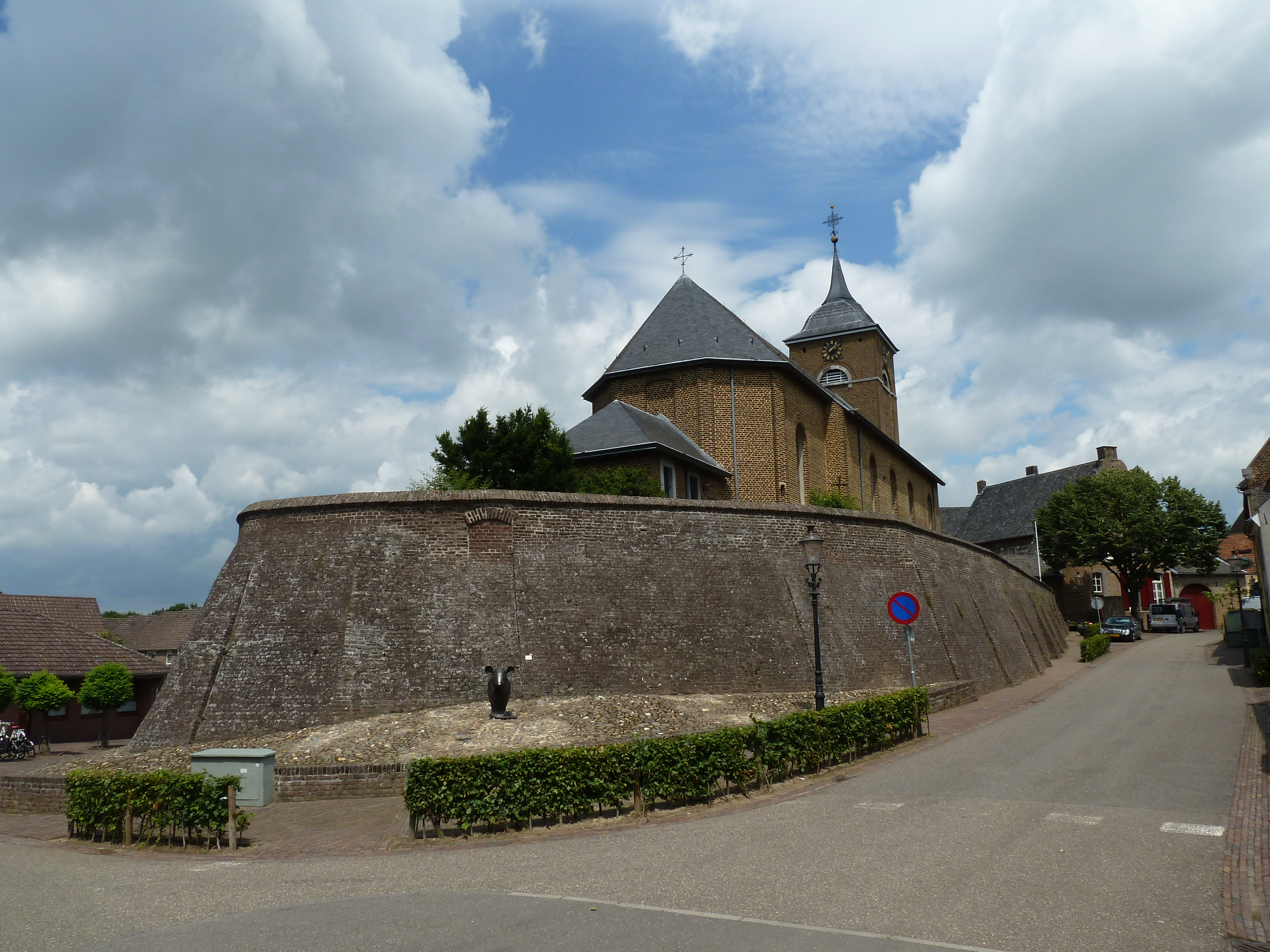
Terp Church
