= Sittard-Geleen =

Sittard-Geleen Zittert-Gelaen (Limburgish)
- Municipality
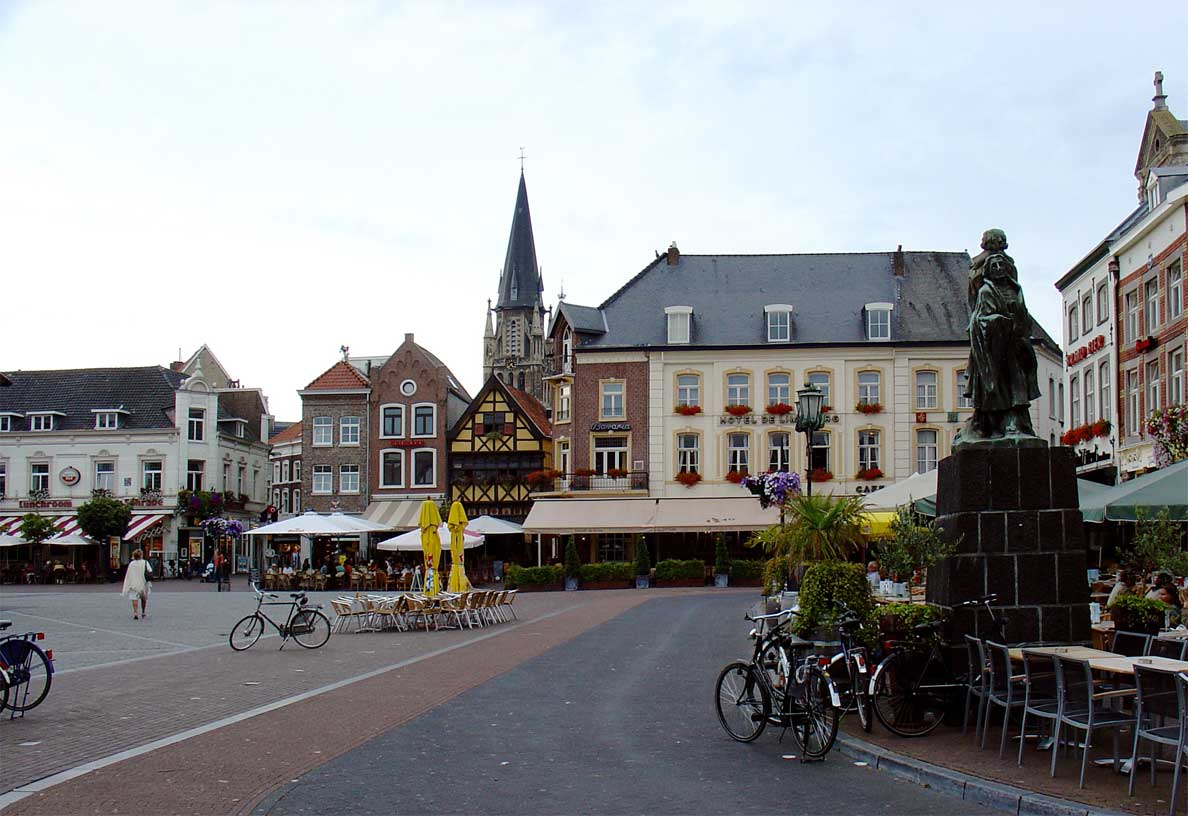
- Sittard market square

- Flag Coat of arms

- Location in Limburg
- Coordinates: 51°0′N 5°52′E
- Country: Netherlands
- Province: Limburg
- Established: 1 January 2001

Government
  - Body: Municipal council
  - Mayor: Hans Verheijen (CDA)

Area
  - Municipality: 80.58 km^{2} (31.11 sq mi)
  - Land: 79.01 km^{2} (30.51 sq mi)
  - Water: 1.57 km^{2} (0.61 sq mi)
- Elevation: 47 m (154 ft)
- Highest elevation: 100 m (330 ft)

Population (Municipality, January 2021; Urban and Metro, May 2014)
  - Municipality: 91,743
  - Density: 1,161/km^{2} (3,010/sq mi)
  - Urban: 135,255
  - Metro: 148,217
- Time zone: UTC+1 (CET)
  - Summer (DST): UTC+2 (CEST)
- Postcode: 6120–6167
- Area code: 046
- Website: www.sittard-geleen.nl

Sittard-Geleen (Dutch: [ˈsɪtɑrt xəˈleːn]; Limburgish: Zittert-Gelaen [ˈzɪtəʀt xəˈlɛːn]) (Note: In isolation, Geleen and Gelaen are pronounced [ɣəˈleːn] and [ʝəˈlɛːn], respectively.) is a municipality in the southeastern Netherlands. It was formed in 2001 from the former municipalities Sittard, Geleen and Born.

The combined municipality has approximately 92,650 inhabitants (January 2024) and is thus the third most populated municipality in Limburg (after Maastricht with 125,000 and Venlo with 103,000 inhabitants). Since February 2020, it has been governed by a coalition of CDA (Christian Democrats), GroenLinks (Green) and the local parties GOB and Stadspartij.

The highway connecting the centres of Sittard and Geleen, the Rijkswegboulevard, has been rebuilt to be a main route for cycling and walking. The provision for cyclists and pedestrians is generous and continuous. Side road junctions, or crossroads, are made 'subordinate'. The carriageways have been narrowed to one 3m lane in each direction. Parking places have been made, in small groups, at the side of the carriageways. These are made to be "not easy to use for larger vehicles," so the road centre is marked as a place for delivery vehicles to stop.

To the west, Sittard-Geleen borders on Belgium, while to the east, it borders on Germany.

== Population centres ==
Abshoven, Born, Broeksittard, Buchten, Einighausen, Geleen, Graetheide, Grevenbicht, Guttecoven, Holtum, Limbricht, Munstergeleen, Windraak, Obbicht, Papenhoven, Schipperskerk and Sittard.

=== Topography ===
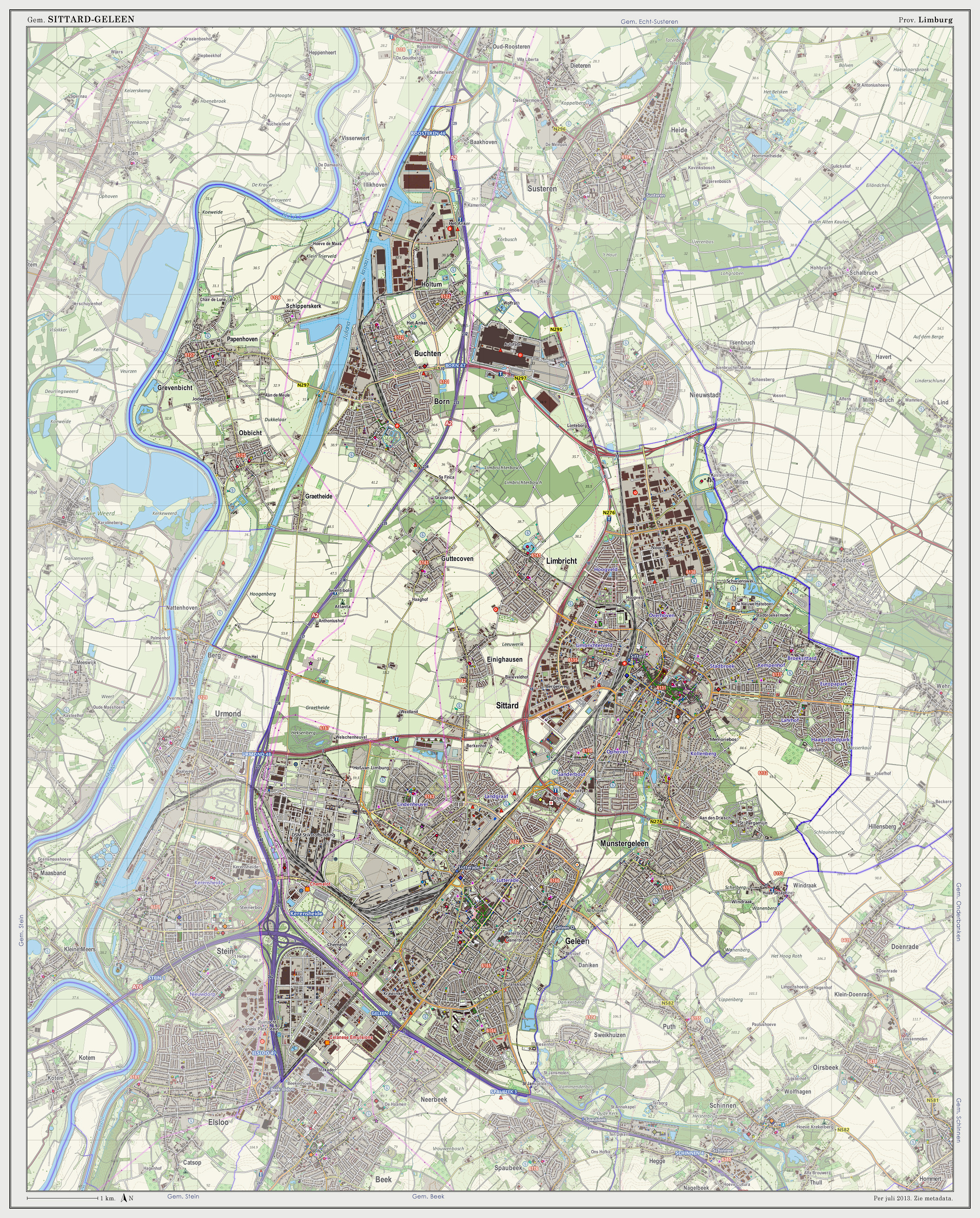

Dutch topographic map of the municipality

== Notable people ==
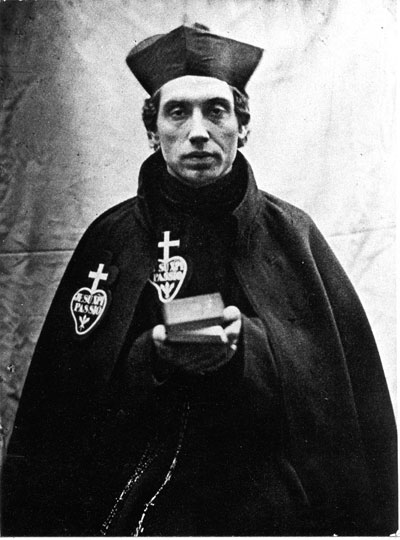
Charles Houben, 1851

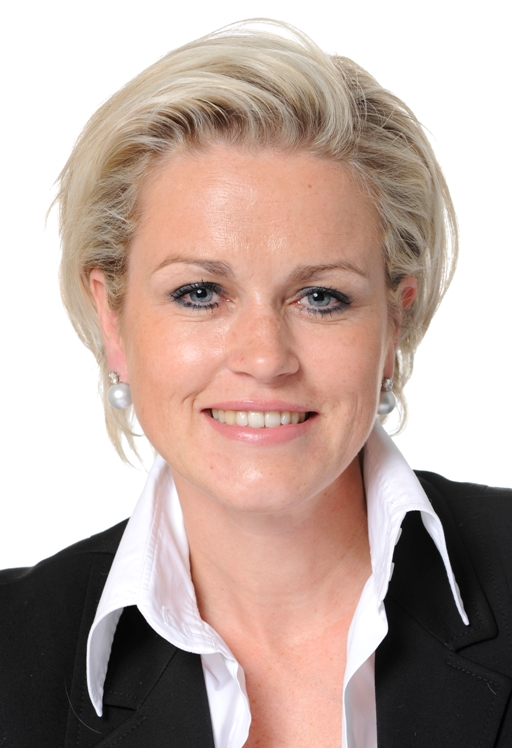
Laurence Stassen, 2009

- Saint Charles of Mount Argus (1821 in Munstergeleen – 1893) a canonized Dutch Passionist priest
- Frederic Adolph Hoefer (1850 in Sittard – 1938) a Dutch lieutenant-general, militaria collector and archivist
- Godfrid Storms (1911 in Sittard – 2003) a Dutch professor of Old and Middle English Literature
- Willy Dols (1911 in Sittard – 1944) a Dutch linguist, dialectologist and phonologist
- Toon Hermans (1916 in Sittard – 2000) a Dutch comedian, singer and writer
- Settela Steinbach (1934 in Buchten – 1944) a Dutch girl who was gassed in Auschwitz-Birkenau
- Thea Fleming (born 1942 in Sittard) a Dutch film actress
- Rein Willems (born 1945 in Geleen) President of Royal Dutch Shell 2003–2007
- Paul Derrez (born 1950 in Sittard) a visual artist, a jewelry designer, gallery owner and collector
- Jan Cremers (born 1952 in Limbricht) a former Dutch politician and sociologist
- Wim Heldens (born 1954 in Sittard) a Dutch realist painter
- Francine Houben (born 1955 in Sittard) a Dutch architect
- Mike van Diem (born 1959, grew up in Sittard) a Dutch film director
- Rineke Dijkstra (born 1959 in Sittard) a Dutch portrait photographer
- Laurence Stassen (born 1971 in Sittard) an independent politician and a former freelance TV presenter
- Myrthe Hilkens (born 1979 in Geleen) a Dutch journalist, non-fiction writer and politician
- Mo'Jones (formed 2000 in Sittard) is a funk, soul and pop band

=== Sport ===
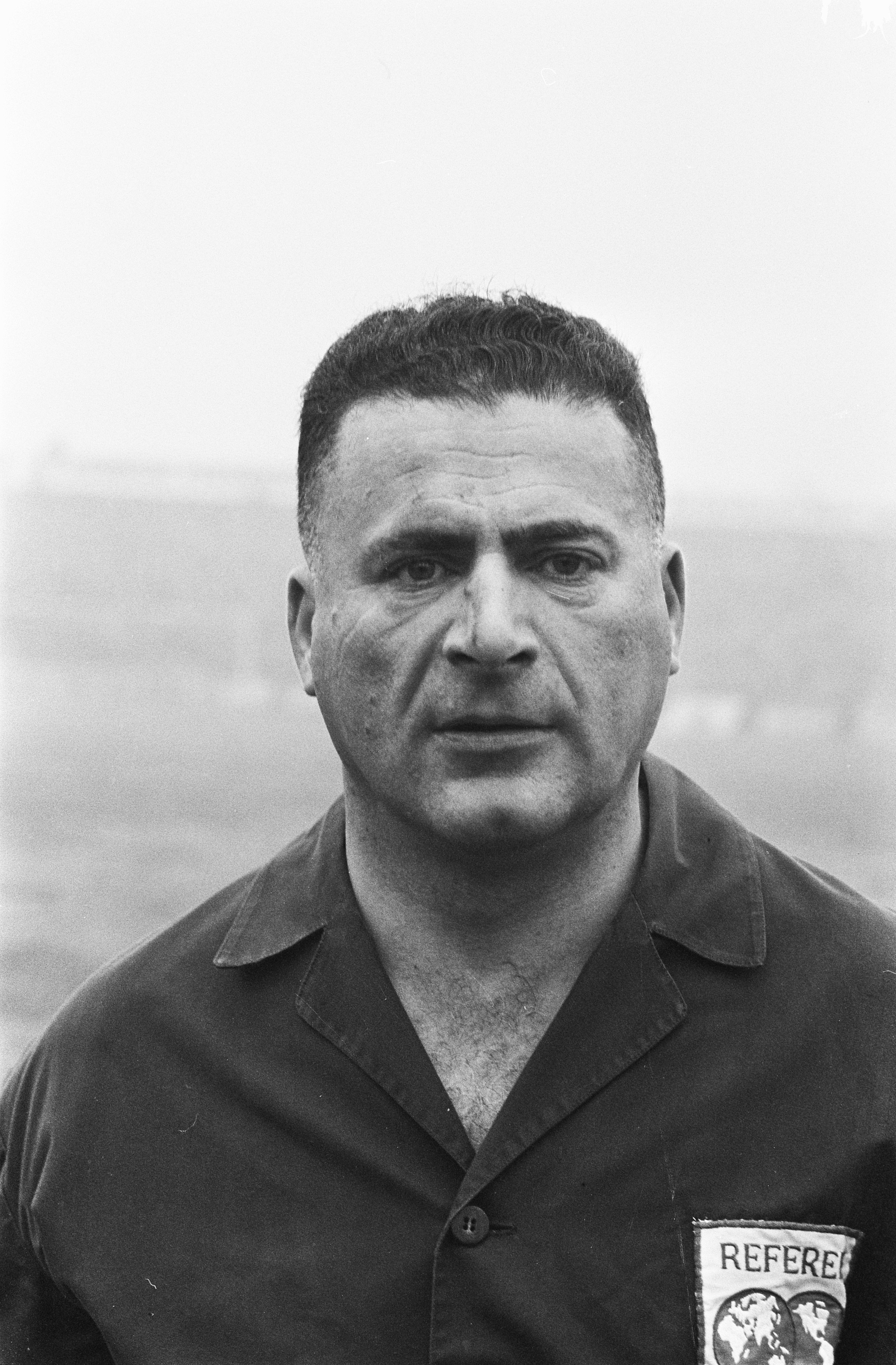
Leo Horn, 1964

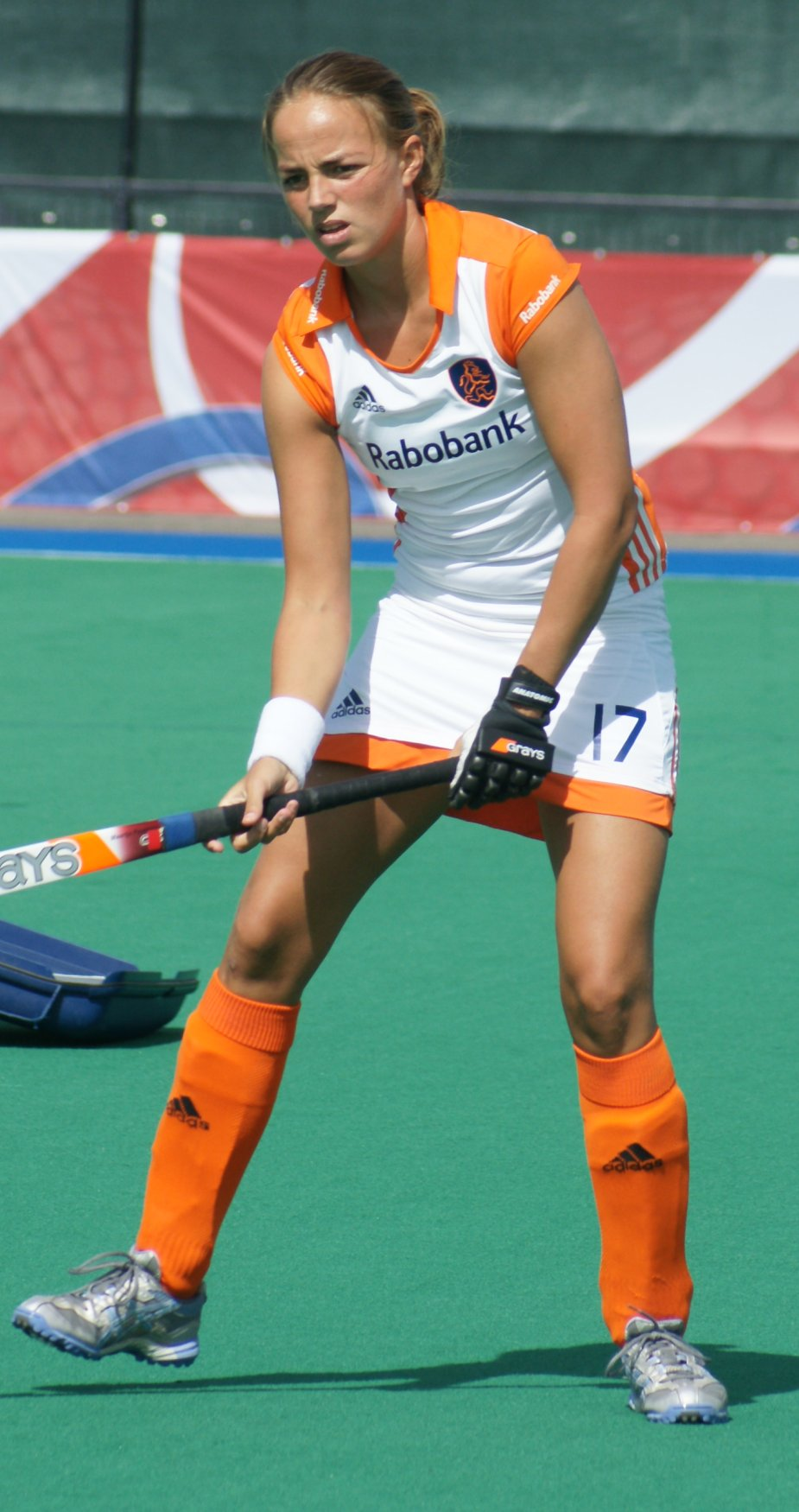
Maartje Paumen, 2009

- Leo Horn (1916 in Sittard – 1995) an international football referee, newspaper columnist, and textile manufacturer
- Jan Krekels (born 1947 in Sittard) a retired cyclist, 1968 Olympic champion in the 100 km team time trial
- Huub Stevens (born 1953 in Sittard) a football manager and former defender with 397 club caps
- Wilbert Suvrijn (born 1962 in Sittard) a retired Dutch footballer with 341 club caps
- Lambert Schuurs (born 1962 in Sittard) a retired handball player and ultra-long-distance runner
- Arnold Vanderlyde (born 1963 in Sittard) a former Dutch boxer, who participated in three Summer Olympics (1984, 1988 and 1992) and won three bronze medals
- Wil Boessen (born 1964 in Sittard) a Dutch retired football player with 397 club caps and manager
- Ton Caanen (born 1966 in Geleen) a Dutch football manager.
- Rens Blom (born 1977 in Munstergeleen) a Dutch pole vaulter, competed in the 2000 and 2004 Summer Olympics
- Maartje Paumen (born 1985 in Geleen) a former Dutch field hockey player, twice gold medallist at the 2008 and 2012 Summer Olympics, silver medallist at the 2016 Summer Olympics
- Benjamin van den Broek (born 1987 in Geleen) a New Zealand international footballer with 275 club caps
- Rob Bontje (born 1981 in Grevenbicht) a volleyball player, competed at the 2004 Olympic Games
- Sjoerd Winkens (born 1983 in Geleen) a former professional footballer with over 300 club caps
- Dominick Muermans (born 1984 in Geleen) a Dutch racing driver
- Perr Schuurs (born 1999 in Nieuwstadt) a Dutch football player

== Twin and partner cities ==
- Hasselt, Belgium
