= Marjorie Schick =

American jewelry

- 2017 photo
- Born: Marjorie Ann Krask; August 29, 1941; Taylorville, Illinois, US
- Died: December 17, 2017 (aged 76); Kansas City, Kansas, US
- Occupations: academic, jewelry artist
- Years active: 1967–2017
- Known for: bold and whimsical large-scale jewelry of wood and papier-mâché

Marjorie Schick (August 29, 1941 – December 17, 2017) was an American jewelry artist and academic who taught art for 50 years. Approaching sculptural creations, her avant-garde pieces have been widely collected. Her works form part of the permanent collections of many of the world's leading art museums, including the Hermitage Museum in Saint Petersburg, Russia; the Museum of Arts and Design in New York City; the National Museum of Modern Art in Kyoto, Japan; the Philadelphia Museum of Art in Pennsylvania; and the Victoria and Albert Museum of London.

Growing up in the Heartland of the United States, Schick was raised by her single mother, who as an art instructor nurtured her creative talent. After attending the University of Wisconsin–Madison, she completed a master's degree in fine art at Indiana University Bloomington. She then moved to Kansas, shortly thereafter beginning a lifetime association with Pittsburg State University, where she taught as an art professor.

In addition to her teaching, Schick developed a worldwide reputation as a jewelry artist, creating works which were more like body sculptures than traditional jewelry. Her conception of pieces allowed her work to be displayed on the body while simultaneously interacting with it, rather than simply being worn as an adornment. As one of the innovators who moved jewelry craftsmanship away from metals in the 1960s, she experimented with a wide variety of materials, including papier-mâché, wooden dowels, rubber, string, and canvas. Her large-scale works were typically brightly colored and represented a modernist abstract aesthetic.

== Early life ==
Marjorie Ann Krask was born on August 29, 1941, in Taylorville, Illinois, to Eleanor (née Curtin) and Edward P. Krask. Following her parents' divorce before her second birthday, she was raised by her mother, rarely seeing her father. Depending on where her mother was teaching or where she attended school, they moved frequently. At various times, they lived in Normal, Illinois; Blue Mound, Illinois; Charleston, Illinois, where Krask began first grade; Decatur, Illinois, where she finished elementary school; Longmont, Colorado, where she attended junior high; and then Evanston, Illinois, where Krask graduated from Evanston Township High School in 1959. In Longmont, her mother, who was an art instructor, introduced her to metalworking and in high school, Krask studied fashion design with Frank Tresise. She spent her summers studying at the Art Institute of Chicago, initially wanting to design clothing, before deciding to become an art instructor herself.

Enrolling in the art department at the University of Wisconsin in Madison, Krask practice taught in Watertown and studied jewelry design under Arthur Vierthaler, as part of her studies. Upon her graduation, in 1963, she married James Baldwin McDonald Schick. Together they moved to Bloomington, Indiana, to finish their studies at Indiana University. She enrolled in a Master of Fine Arts program under the tutelage of Alma Eikerman, who would become her lifelong mentor and a strong influence on her work. She was trained as a traditional metalsmith and jeweller, graduating with distinction in 1966. Near the end of her schooling, an article she read about the work of abstract sculptor, David Smith, became influential for her work. She began to conceptualize jewelry as a type of sculpture which could be worn.

== Career ==
There are five major aspects to my work: the constructed three-dimensional form, the color relationships, the definition of space, the combination of patterns, and the scale of the objects in relationship to the human figure. My goal is to create a sense of visual tension among the formal elements of each object, such as from line to plane, from color to value, from one directional force to another, or from the rhythms in the structure to the rhythms in the colors. Each object is studied and worked in totality, no part being any less important than any other.

— Marjorie Schick, 2010 artist's statement Pittsburg State University.

When the couple graduated they began their teaching careers at the University of Kansas in Lawrence, with her husband teaching in the history department while she taught art. Schick first began working in papier-mâché during the time in Lawrence, using it as a lightweight alternative to metal, allowing her to create larger pieces. At the time, the medium was unconventional, and Schick's experimentation evolved from creating frames of chicken wire, coating them in the pulp mixture and shaping them to form. While her traditional jewelry pieces were readily accepted for juried exhibits, her papier-mâché adornments were regularly rejected as too radical. In 1967, both of the Schicks were hired by Pittsburg State University, at the time known as Kansas State College at Pittsburg. In 1969, she went back to the idea of putting her body through one of the sculptures of David Smith. Instead of the flat two-dimensional pieces she had made up to that time, she molded a brass headpiece with tubes on which she welded blue-lensed glasses at eye-level. Nicknaming the piece Blue Eyes, Head Sculpture changed the focus of her work from metalwork jewelry to wearable sculpture.

=== 1970s ===
Schick became part of the Modernist era, creating works which explored abstraction through line, mass, space and volume. She took account of the difference between experiencing an object based on its presentation and the materials used, and its aesthetic significance. Her early jewelry designs were expressionistic, evoking emotions of conflict and contact. They made use of silver wire mixed with melted and pitted brass or bronze twisted into shapes. Many of them had the feel of objet trouvé artifacts. The pieces of her Cycladic Series featured polished shapes of brass and copper designed as oversized bracelets, brooches, and necklaces. For a time, she believed her metalwork was "serious art" and her experimentation with other media, far less important.

Thanks to its lightweight, pliable qualities, she experimented with papier-mâché, as a means of extending forms away from the body. It also allowed volume and color to be used in ways that traditional metalwork could not. Schick produced pieces on wire frames encapsulated with molded pulp to surround the body. Rather than creating conventional wrist or neck adornments, her large creations were designed to be displayed on the whole body, from shoulder to foot. In 1976, Schick was contacted by Mary Ann Bransby, a jewelry instructor from Kansas City's University of Missouri, to create jewelry pieces for the school's modern dance troupe. The dancers used the pieces in innovative ways, putting rings on their toes or a bracelet on their foot, which caused Schick to recognize that pieces could be reinterpreted. The group gave performances and exhibitions of the artwork at venues including the Albrecht Gallery in St. Joseph, Missouri, the Bronx Museum of the Arts, the Kansas City Art Institute, and Lindenwood College in Saint Charles, Missouri. By the end of the 1970s, Schick grew tired of papier-mâché as a medium. She took courses in ceramics and plastics and experimented with making jewelry from clay, paper, plastic, thread, and combinations of thread and paper.

=== 1980s ===
At the beginning of the 1980s, Schick began working with fiber, string and dowel rods, submitting six small pieces to an alternative media exhibit, "Jewelry Redefined: First International Exhibition of Multi-Media Non-Precious Jewellery" hosted by the British Crafts Centre in London in 1982. Receiving a letter from Paul Derrez, one of the jurors and owner of Ra Gallery in Amsterdam, she created a solo exhibit for his gallery. The show brought her international recognition and she was asked to participate in the Isetan Art Museum's International Jewellery Art Exhibition in Tokyo, where she won an award in fine arts. As her work began receiving international attention and became an influence on European jewelers, the American market began to accept her work. Her stick designs played with the illusions of negative space, with pieces of dowel riveted into pick-up sticks, spirals, and zig-zag shapes, creating a dialogue between the body and the adornment. Utilizing wood, rubber tubes and string, she created interlocking geometric shapes bordering on the outrageous and questioning the need to create mass-produced useful adornment.

Taking a sabbatical from PSU, Schick studied metalworking at Sir John Cass College of Art beginning in 1983, leading to her first solo exhibition at Derrez's gallery that same year. In 1984, she worked as the artist-in-residence of John Cass. Schick was the only American to participate in the New Jewelry Movement which swept through England and the Netherlands. At the end of the 1980s, she began to make pieces of plywood and began to focus predominantly on neckwear. However, she did continue to make wooden bracelets during this time, using dowel sticks which were painted with variegated colors. Her three-dimensional pieces were more like sculpture than traditional flat jewelry and could as easily be displayed on a wall as worn. Schick also began exploring companion pieces, making her jewelry part of paintings, so that when they were not being worn, they could be displayed as artworks. She incorporated a whimsical series of teapots into her pieces, that took on the form of bracelets, brooches, or frames around the head and neck which could be shifted and disassembled. Creating hybrid pieces which blurred the boundaries between handicrafts, ornamentation, painting and sculpture, Schick worked in-the-round, giving all sides of a work equal focus, pressing the boundaries of traditional jewelry. Conscious of the sculptural notion that pieces would be viewed from any angle, she focused not only on the front and back of a piece, but how it would appear on or off a wall, on or off the body, or from any vantage point. By 1986, she had participated in fourteen international showings at nine art museums throughout the world.

In 1987, Schick was one of the featured artists in a traveling exhibit that was shown throughout Virginia called Jewelry Now. The show also highlighted nationally known jewelers, including Jamie Bennett, Robert Ebendorf, Rebekah Laskin, Ivy Ross, Susan Sanders and Sandra Zilker. Schick continued producing pieces for performance art, such as Collar in 1988, a neck piece six inches thick and 31 inches wide. While impractical for wearing as an every day adornment, the vibrant color scheme forced the wearer and observer to imagine and redefine how one moves through space. In 1989, the School of Fine Arts Gallery of her alma mater in Indiana hosted a solo show Marjorie Schick: A Retrospective, covering the first 25 years of her career. It featured over a hundred works, displayed without the use of models or mannequins, either protruding from walls or hanging from ceilings. The display showed that the works were non-functional as simple adornments and in a unique way were "unfinished" in the absence of the body of the wearer.

=== 1990s ===
Schick returned to papier-mâché in the 1990s, using different painting techniques. Wishing to explore color, she began to work with fabric, just as painters use canvas. Disliking the flatness of the surface, she created pockets stuffed with Poly-Fil to add sculptural texture. The first piece in the series, Necklace "De la Luna/del Sol", was created in 1996 and inspired by the Peruvian archaeological sites of Huaca del Sol and Huaca de la Luna. In 1998, Schick and her husband planned a sabbatical in Mexico, with tours to Europe. She began a series of pieces related to their travels, inspired by the varied color palettes of the differing landscapes. In particular, she was interested in exploring how different colors trigger memories of places and events. Glen Brown, an art historian from Kansas State University, likened these works to "souvenir scrapbooks" in a symbolist style, which captured the personal experiences of the traveler without need for a photorealistic representation. Her work could also be considered pop-surrealism as noted by Graham Shearing in his review of the 1998 exhibition "Revelations: New Jewelry" by members of the Society of North American Goldsmiths (SNAG). Her contribution was a piece called Katella.

At times Schick used unprimed canvas to allow the light color washes to permeate the fabric, such as in the piece Brick Street, a homage to Pittsburg, Kansas. On others, she used heavy coats of gesso to build form and texture before painting the surfaces. In her work, Quetzalcoatl, completed after the Mexico trip, she used heavily gessoed fabric pouches and paint to represent the feathered snakes found in pre-Columbian sites they had visited at Chichén Itzá, Palenque and Teotihuacán. She used vivid colors and muted grays to represent the once vibrant murals completed in Maya blue and terracotta which have faded over time. In another piece, Chicago Windows, representing the Chicago skyline, Schick riveted black oak strips together to form panes around the brightly colored rectangles of plywood adorned with string to create the geometrical framework of the black background.

Another piece representative of this period was Bound Colors, a necklace with ribbons of canvas laced through wood strips creating a design reminiscent of the Aztec calendar stone interwoven with a color wheel. It was mounted on a painted plywood base, from which it could be removed for wear, allowing the aesthetic of the piece to transcend the individual components of jewelry, painting and sculpture. The large scale of her works was intentional, so that the pieces were not tucked away in a drawer, but rather had multiple uses in different interconnected interpretations. Her work was designed to encompass the body, and rather than ornamental accessories, became "three-dimensional drawings-to-wear".

=== 2000s ===
Yellow Ladderback Chair (2001)

In the 2000s, Schick began experimenting with turning everyday items into wearable art. She designed Yellow Ladderback Chair in 2001 to evoke the "experience of being in a chair". The canvas necklace, creates a symbiosis of the ornamentation with the human wearer. That year, she participated in the group showing Open Links, hosted in Bowling Green, Ohio, by the university's fine arts department, with the aim of broadening attendees' perspectives to the redefinition of what jewelry could be. Two years later, she created Tool Belt and Scarf for Sonia Delaunay inspired by Delaunay's patterned designs. The belt, made of dowels, and the scarf, made of wood blocks, mirror the futuristic motifs of the painter and are surrounded by wooden implements such as paint brushes and pans, a needle, scissors and thread, which Delaunay might have used in her work. When the piece is worn, the tools of the artist's trade float around the wearer's knees.

Schick began a series of necklaces with autobiographical themes. The numbered pieces, Necklace 1, Necklace 2, and so forth, depict representations of her life journey. She used color to represent variations in mood, such as shiny metallic paint for Necklace 21 representing the year of her marriage and the addition of blacks, grays and whites to Necklace 29, showing how much more complex her life became after the birth of her son.

In 2000, Schick was made a fellow of the American Craft Council and in 2002 was honored by Governor of Kansas, Bill Graves as the state's artist of the year. In addition to her professorship, throughout her career, Schick taught at various seminars and workshops, including Arrowmont School of Arts and Crafts, the Cleveland Institute of Art, the Haystack Mountain School of Crafts, the Penland School of Crafts in the United States and programs abroad at Middlesex Polytechnic of London, the National Museum of Art, Architecture and Design in Oslo; the Nova Scotia College of Art and Design of Halifax; and at the Silpakorn University in Bangkok.

In 2004, Tacey A. Rosolowski, a specialist in adornment art, prepared an oral history interview for the Smithsonian American Art Museum with Schick. A 40-year retrospective of the artist's work, Sculpture Transformed: The Work of Marjorie Schick, was curated by Rosolowski at Indiana University in 2007. Sixty-seven pieces of jewelry were exhibited covering the trajectory of Schick's development of themes and content, which focused on the transformative awareness of the body that one experienced while wearing her designs. Rosolowski was the principal collaborator on a book, Sculpture to Wear: The Jewelry of Marjorie Schick published as a retrospective of Schick's work by Arnoldsche Art Publishers in 2007. The book was written by ten contributors and covered the trajectory of Schick's career, assessing her innovation and impact on the development of the contemporary international jewelry aesthetic. After the book was released, a retrospective of Schick's work, by the same title began touring. The exhibit, accompanied by lectures, featured works loaned from the collections of museums, and toured throughout the United States and Europe between 2008 and 2009. Rosolowski also wrote the cover story, Sculpture for the Body for Craft Arts International′s 2008 edition featuring Schick's work.

In 2011, Schick's works were exhibited in a show at the Smithsonian American Art Museum in Washington, D. C. and in 2013, the Los Angeles County Museum of Art received 300 pieces of jewelry from the private collection of Lois Boardman which included some of Schick's designs. The works were featured in an exhibit Beyond Bling: Jewelry from the Lois Boardman Collection in 2017. In 2016, Schick stated in an interview with Art Jewelry Forum that her current work involved a series of wood shirts, whose design mimicked the styles of artists including Alexander Calder and Jim Dine. Schick retired from teaching in 2017, after having served 50 years at Pittsburg State University.

== Death and legacy ==
Schick died from complications of a stroke on December 17, 2017, at the Kansas University Medical Center in Kansas City, Kansas. Her pieces can be found in the permanent collections of many world-renowned museums, including the Hermitage Museum in Saint Petersburg, Russia; the Museum of Arts and Design in New York City; the National Gallery of Australia in Canberra; the National Museum of Art, Architecture and Design of Oslo; the National Museum of Modern Art in Kyoto, Japan; the National Museum of Modern and Contemporary Art in Seoul, South Korea; the National Museum of Scotland of Edinburgh; the Philadelphia Museum of Art in Pennsylvania; the Pinakothek der Moderne in Munich, Germany; and the Victoria and Albert Museum of London. Her teaching influenced generations of students including metalworkers Janet Lewis, whose works adorn the walls of the Pittsburg Public Library, and Sam Farmer, a 1987 recipient of the Elizabeth B. Koch Fellowship from the Kansas Cultural Trust, as well as painter Tera Reed and Native American weaver Margaret Roach Wheeler (Choctaw-Chickasaw). In 2025, a chapter about her in Lives of the Great Makers called her "pre-eminent American jewellery artist".

== Awards and honors ==
- 2000, Fellow of the American Craft Council
- 2002, Kansas State Artist of the Year
- 2004, Chosen as an interviewee for the Nanette L. Laitman Documentation Project for Craft and Decorative Arts in America
- 2006, Commendation from the State Senate of Kansas

== Selected exhibits ==
- 1983, solo debut, RA Gallery (Dutch: Galerie RA), Amsterdam
- 1985, solo show, VO Galerie, Washington, D.C.
- 1985, solo show, Helen Drutt Gallery, Philadelphia, Pennsylvania
- 1986, Jewelry, form and idea (Dutch: Sieraden, vorm en idee), Gemeentelijke Van Reekum Museum, Apeldoorn, the Netherlands
- 1987, Jewelry Now, traveling exhibition sponsored by the Virginia Commission for the Arts
- 1988, Marjorie Schick, Transition, solo exhibit, RA Gallery, Amsterdam
- 1989, Hats, Helmets and Other Headgear, Faith Nightingale Gallery, San Diego, California
- 1994, KPMG Peat Marwick Collection of American Craft: A Gift to the Renwick Gallery, Renwick Gallery of the National Museum of American Art, Smithsonian Institution, Washington, D. C.
- 1996, New Times, New Thinking: Jewellery in Europe and America, Crafts Council, London
- 1998, Brooching it Diplomatically: A Tribute to Madeleine K. Albright, Secretary of State of the United States of America, Museum Het Kruithuis, Den Bosch, the Netherlands opening. The event, featuring 61 artists toured from the opening through 2000 throughout the world, including venues in Estonia, Finland, the Netherlands and at various galleries in the United States from Hawaii to New York and Philadelphia.
- 1998, Jewelry Moves, National Museum of Scotland, Edinburgh
- 1998, Marjorie Schick, A Sense of Place, solo exhibit, RA Gallery, Amsterdam
- 1998, Time, Color Place, Mobilia Gallery, Cambridge, Massachusetts
- 2001, Masquerade, 25 years Galerie Ra, Amsterdam
- 2002, Zero Karat, the Donna Schneier Gift to the American Craft Museum, Museum of Arts and Design, Manhattan
- 2004, HOUdT van sieraden, Galerie Lous Martin, Delft, The Netherlands
- 2004, Treasures from the Vault: Contemporary Jewelry from the Permanent Collection, Museum of Arts and Design, Manhattan
- 2005, Schmuck 2005, International Crafts Fair, Munich
- 2005, 100 Brooches, Velvet da Vinci Gallery, San Francisco, California
- 2006, Challenging the Chatelaine, Design Museum, Helsinki
- 2006, Radiant—30 Years Ra Gallery, Amsterdam
- 2006, Preziosa 2006: No body decoration, Villa Bottini, Lucca, Italy
- 2007, Ornament as Art: Avant-Garde Jewelry from the Helen Williams Drutt Collection, Museum of Fine Arts, Houston, Texas. Following the opening the show toured throughout the United States until 2009.
- 2007, Sculpture Transformed: The Work of Marjorie Schick, solo show, Museum of Craft and Design, San Francisco, California. After the opening exhibit, the tour which ran through 2009 included venues at the Indiana University Art Museum at Bloomington, Indiana; the Marianna Kistler Beach Museum of Art in Manhattan, Kansas; the Fuller Craft Museum of Brockton, Massachusetts; and the Muskegon Museum of Art in Muskegon, Michigan.
- 2013, Dare to Wear: The Collection of Paul Derrez and Willem Hoogstede, Cultuur Onder Dak Apeldoorn (CODA), Apeldoorn, the Netherlands
- 2014, Gifts from America: 1948–2013, Hermitage Museum, Saint Petersburg, Russia
- 2016, Beyond Bling: contemporary jewelry from the Lois Boardman Collection, Los Angeles County Museum of Art (LACMA), Los Angeles, California
- 2017, Medusa, Bijoux et tabous, Musée d'Art Moderne de la Ville de Paris, Paris, France
