= Leo Ehlen =

Dutch footballer (1953–2016)

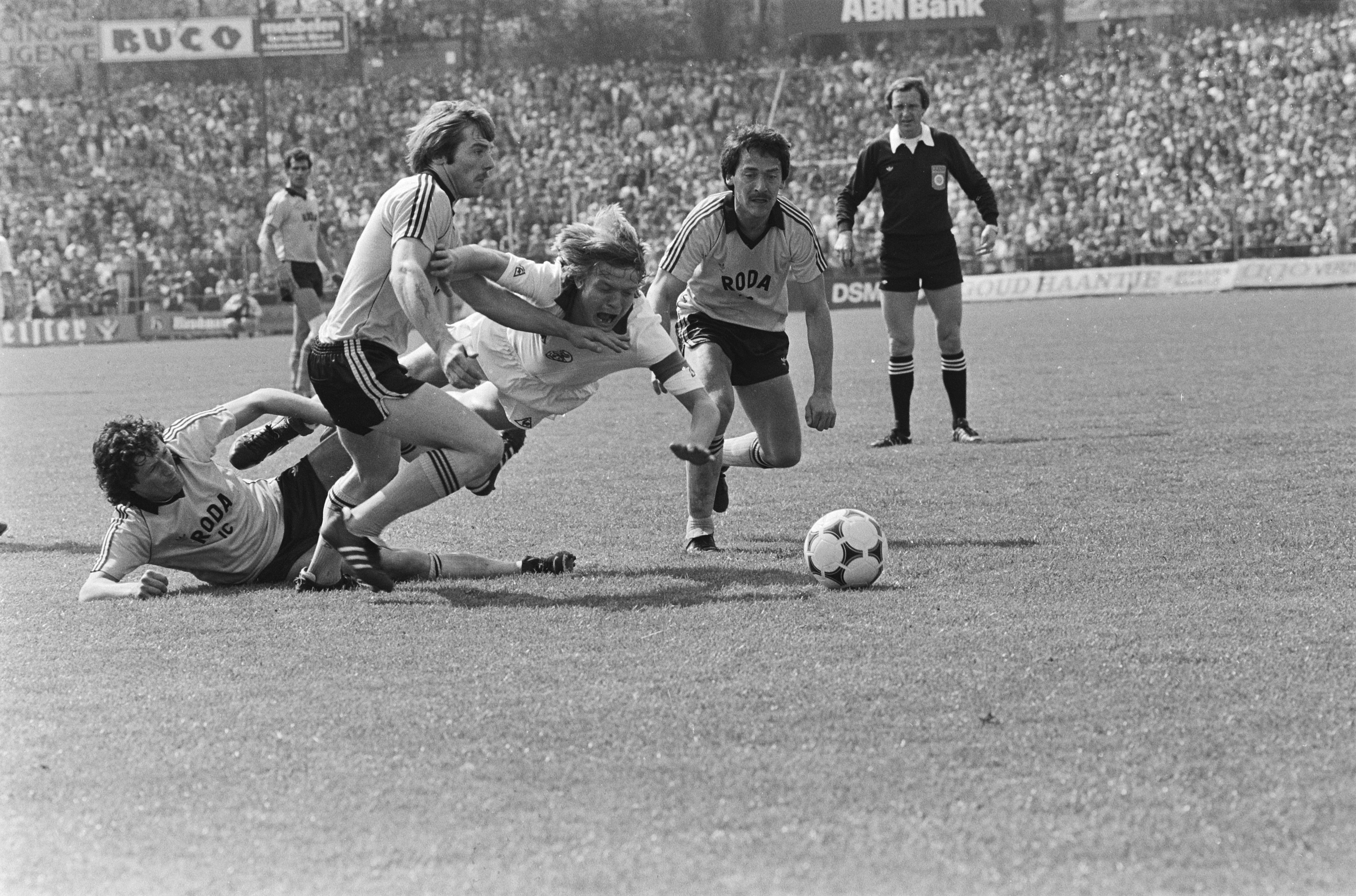
- Ehlen (left) tripping Ajax' Søren Lerby in May 1982

Personal information
- Full name: Petrus Leonardus Ehlen
- Date of birth: 20 May 1953
- Place of birth: Broeksittard, Netherlands
- Date of death: 10 February 2016 (aged 62)
- Place of death: Sittard, Netherlands
- Position: Defender

Youth career
- Almania

Senior career*
Years	Team	Apps	(Gls)
1974–1975	Fortuna SC	28	(0)
1975–1984	Roda JC	232	(5)
1984–1985	Waterschei	14	(0)
Total		274	(5)
- * Club domestic league appearances and goals

Leo Ehlen (20 May 1953 – 10 February 2016) was a Dutch football player.

== Club career ==
A tough-tackling defender or defensive midfielder, Ehlen started his professional career with Eerste Divisie side Fortuna SC and joined Roda JC in 1975, where he played alongside Dick Nanninga, Pierre Vermeulen and Theo de Jong. Nicknamed the Neeskens of Roda after Holland hard man Johan Neeskens, Ehlen scored 6 goals in 233 official matches for the club and left them after nine years for a spell with Belgian side Waterschei.

He later played for amateur team EHC.

== Personal life and death ==
After retiring, Ehlen owned bar ’t Huikske in Broeksittard, where he grew up around the corner. His father Nol was a Limburgian cyclist.

He died in February 2016, aged 62. He had suffered from a kidney disease. He was survived by his wife and son. A minute silence was observed in his memory before kick-off of Roda's home game against FC Twente three days later.
