= Margaret Roach Wheeler =

Native American textile artist and designer

- Born: Margaret Roach; 1943 (age 82–83); South Dakota
- Citizenship: Chickasaw Nation, American
- Movement: Southeastern Woodlands Native art
- Spouse: Glenn Wheeler
- Website: margaretroachwheeler.com

Margaret Roach Wheeler (born 1943) is a Chickasaw/Choctaw textile artist and Native American fashion designer. Her work has been widely recognized for her scholarship in researching precontact designs and techniques of the Indigenous peoples of the Southeastern Woodlands and incorporating design elements into her woven garments.

Her work has been featured in numerous collections including the Smithsonian's National Museum of the American Indian, where she has also served as a visiting artist and received a research fellowship. She was inducted into the Chickasaw Nation Hall of Fame in 2010 and was honored by the State of Oklahoma with the Governor's Arts Award in 2018 for her unique contributions to art. She is the founder of Mahota Textiles.

== Early life ==
Margaret Roach was born in 1943 in South Dakota to Rubey (née Massey) and Diamond Roach. Her Chickasaw mother grew up in Tishomingo, Oklahoma, after her great-grandmother, Nancy Mahota (also named Emahota) had walked the Trail of Tears from her ancestral homelands in the area between Holly Springs and Oxford, Mississippi. Her Choctaw father worked for the Bureau of Indian Affairs (BIA) as a teacher and the family moved often, living in "North Carolina, Arizona, South Dakota, Washington state and Montana" at different times. She had two older siblings, Lawanda and Robert. Among the various tribes with whom they lived, Roach enjoyed the rich cultural exposure and was encouraged to pursue her interest in painting. As a child, Roach watched her mother and grandmother use various fibers in their knitted and crocheted, embroidered, and sewed works.

By the time Wheeler entered high school, her family lived in Tahlequah, Oklahoma. After completing high school, Roach married in 1960 with Glen Wheeler, a classmate. Subsequently, the couple had two children, Kristine and Wade. Like her father, Glen was a teacher for the BIA and the family first lived on the Navajo Nation and then relocated to Joplin, Missouri, when he was posted at the Seneca Indian School. Up to that time, Wheeler had remained at home and raised their children, but she decided to go to college, pursuing a degree in education with a goal to teach sculpture. She enrolled at Missouri Southern State College in Joplin and earned a bachelor's degree in 1975.

== Teaching career ==
After completing her studies, Roach began her career teaching. Between 1975 and 1984, she taught batik, jewelry design, paper making, and weaving, at Parkwood High School. During her time there, she enrolled in a master's degree program at Pittsburg State University studying with Marjorie Schick and received a master's degree in fiber arts in 1978. Though Schick was primarily known for oversized jewelry bordering on body sculpture, her influence led Wheeler into using textiles as wall art and later into fashion design. While preparing some of her wall hangings for an exhibit, Wheeler decided to weave her dress for the event and soon was weaving articles with Native American motifs that looked like buckskin or fabric with beadwork.

== Art career ==
Hiring a firm to analyze the market and design a business plan in 1981, the consultant told Wheeler the business would likely be unsuccessful. Ignoring the advice, she left her teaching job and opened Mahota Handwovens, named after her maternal great-great-grandmother. She conducted her own study with museums that were known for promoting Indigenous art. When she consulted with Tulsa's Gilcrease Museum, curators asked her to design 20 garments for a fashion show. Wheeler combines her fine arts training with classical weaving techniques to make garments that are "an expressive cultural art form."

Wheeler viewed clothing as wearable art, merging function with display, as she considered that the body was simply a canvas upon which art could be seen. As her childhood had been spent among numerous Indigenous groups, Wheeler's woven goods tend to merge design elements and motifs from many Native cultures.

Interested in history, Wheeler researches in museum and archaeological collections, to discover historic techniques used before and after European colonization. Her interest includes discovery of diverse materials, such as hides, feathers, beadwork, ribbonwork, bison fur, and others that she adds to woven fabrics, using natural fibers. She does not use actual beads or feathers in her designs but weaves various fibers to mimic other materials. Her craftsmanship has won awards at the Santa Fe Market and earned her a Smithsonian Fellowship, in 2000, where she served as a visiting artist for the National Museum of the American Indian. She has also worked as an adjunct professor at Southwest Missouri State University and conducts lectures at various universities on textile arts. In 2009, she branched into costume design, working with composer Jerod Tate and poet Linda Hogan on the production Lowak Shoppala (Fire and Light). Using dancers from Cara Crawford Dance Studio and members of the Chickasaw Children's Choir, Chickasaw Dance Troupe, Chickasaw Hymn Singers and Oklahoma Youth Orchestra, the multi-media production was a celebration of Chickasaw culture. Wheeler has exhibited internationally and conducted weaving workshops throughout the United States. In 2010, she taught courses in Devon and Reading, England, having previously taught twice in England.

== Exhibitions ==
In 1985, Wheeler exhibited at the Gilcrease Museum, and then in 1986 and 1987, she participated in the Red Earth Festival fashion show. She also participated in 1986 in the Talking Threads: Contemporary Native American Fashions exhibition held at the Wheelwright Museum of the American Indian in Santa Fe. In 1988, she participated in the Handweavers Guild of America international fashion show, known as Convergence. The biannual exhibit occurs at the end of a conference to teach weaving techniques and ends with a juried selection of works. She was the only Native American artist who participated and her work was selected for the fashion show. Wheeler continued her participation in the event through the late 1990s, but also began exhibiting at the Santa Fe Indian Market.

Wheeler has participated in group exhibitions at the Heard Museum, Museum of Indian Arts and Culture, Institute of American Indian Arts, the Museum of Arts and Design, and the National Museum of the American Indian. During Native Fashion Now at NMAI's George Gustav Heye Center in Manhattam, she was also chosen as one of four Native American fashion designers chosen to speak on textile arts.

== Awards and honors ==
She has won numerous awards and honors throughout her career, including Best of Class in the weaving and textiles category at the 2009 annual Heard Museum Guild Indian Fair and Market, as well as first in 3-D division in the 2008 and 2010 Southeastern Art Show and Market (SEASAM) competition hosted by the Chickasaw Nation in Tishomingo, Oklahoma. She was inducted into the Chickasaw Nation Hall of Fame in 2010. In 2018, she was given a Governor's Arts Award from the State of Oklahoma for her unique contributions to the arts. She received the 2020 Chickasaw Nation Dynamic Woman of the Year award, which recognizes a Chickasaw woman who has made great accomplishments in her career field and contributed towards the preservation and perpetuation of Chickasaw culture. In 2026, she was named a United States Artists (USA) Fellow.
