= Abshoven =

Abshoven Abshaove (Limburgish)
- Hamlet
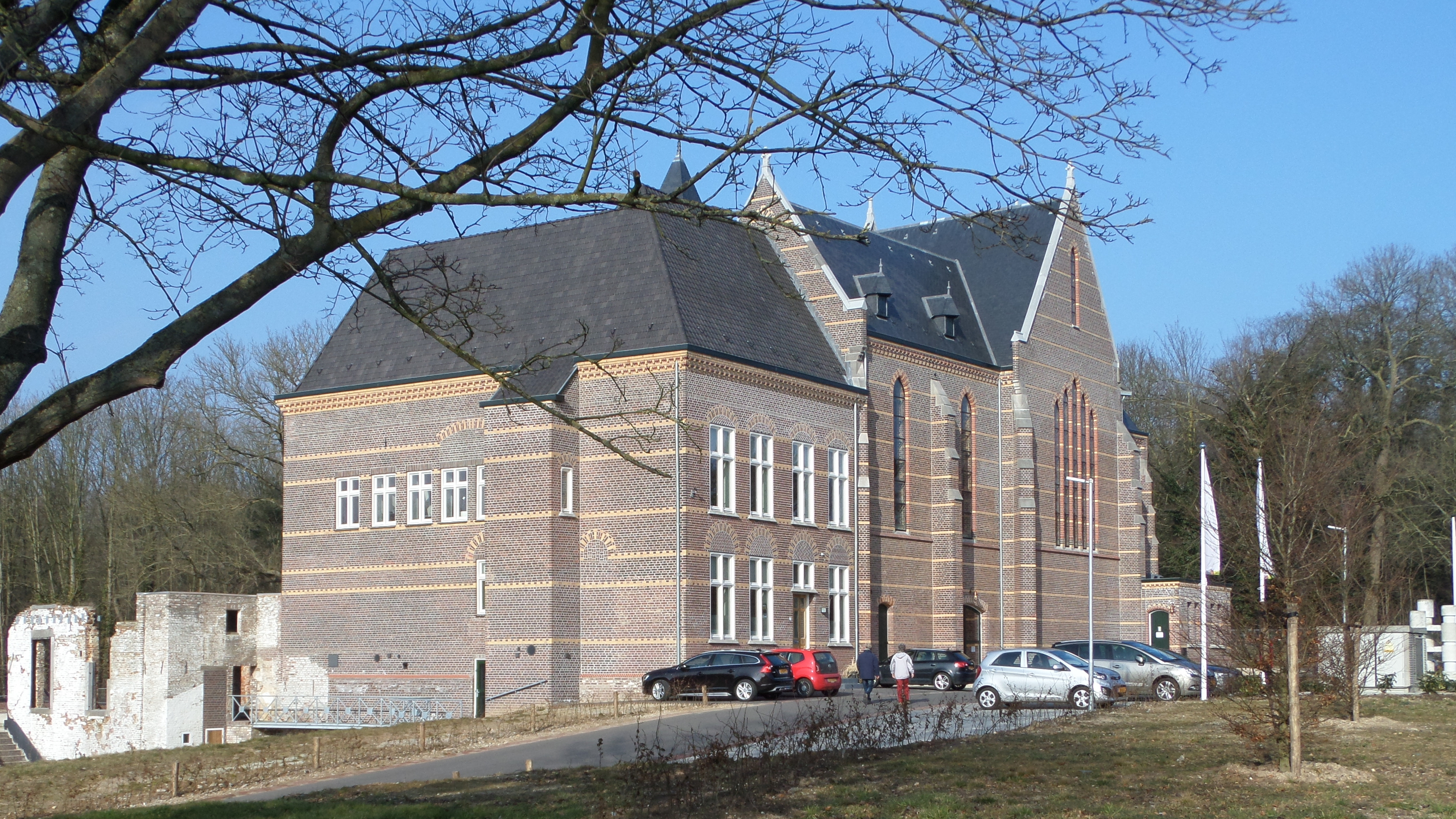
- Abshoven monastery

- Location in the Netherlands Location in the province of Limburg in the Netherlands
- Coordinates: 50°58′N 5°51′E
- Country: Netherlands
- Province: Limburg
- Municipality: Sittard-Geleen
- Village: Munstergeleen
- Elevation: 60 m (200 ft)

Population
  - Total: c. 100
- Time zone: UTC+1 (CET)
  - Summer (DST): UTC+2 (CEST)
- Postcode: 6151
- Area code: 046

Abshoven (Dutch: [ˈɑpsˌɦoːvə(n)]; Limburgish: Abshaove) is a hamlet in the municipality of Sittard-Geleen in the province of Limburg in the Netherlands. It is located to the south of Munstergeleen and to the east of Geleen. The hamlet has approximately forty houses and is located on the Abshoven and Beekstraat roads. The hamlet is dominated by the remains of the Abshoven monastery.

== Gallery ==
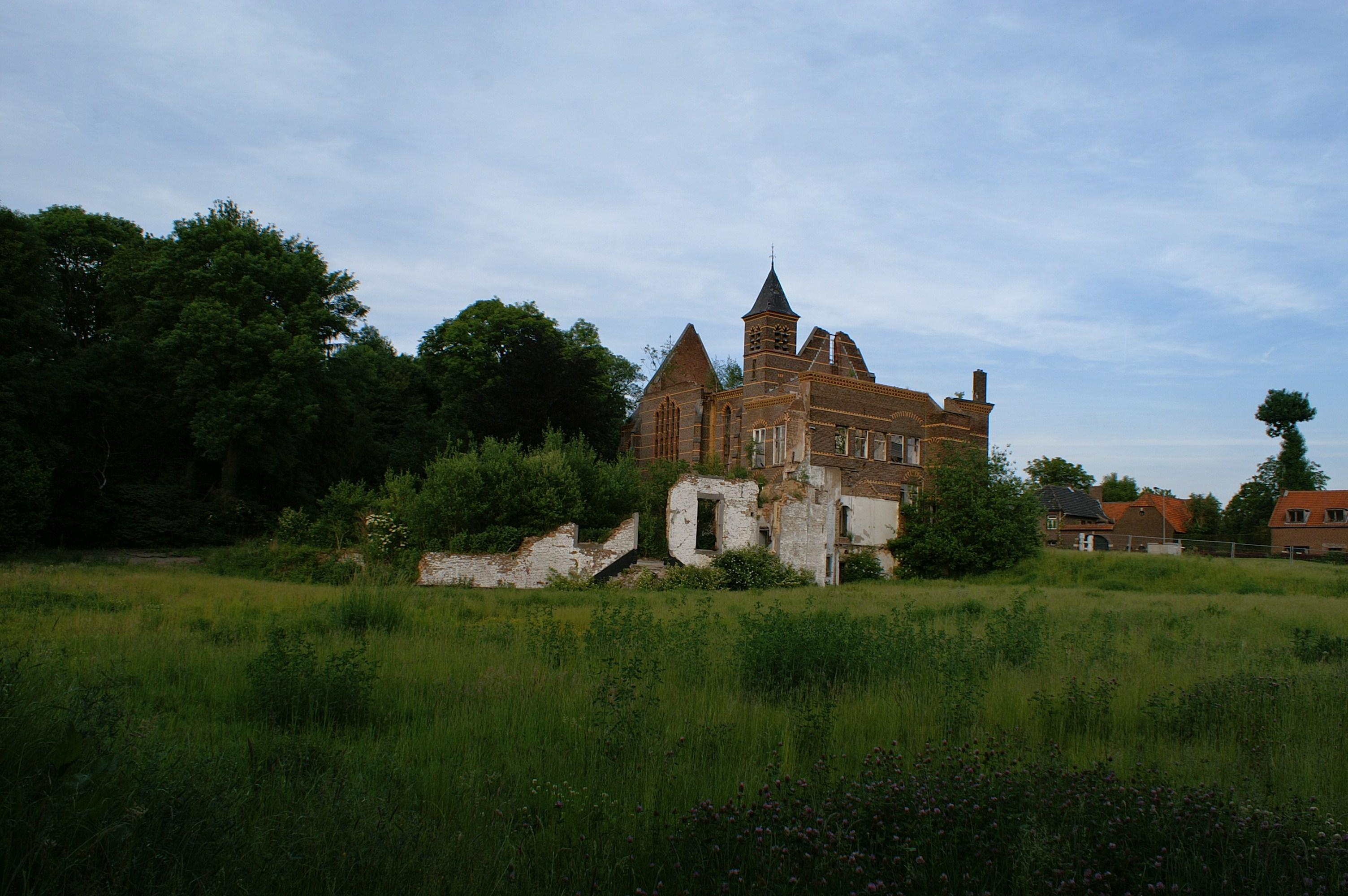
Monastery ruins before restoration

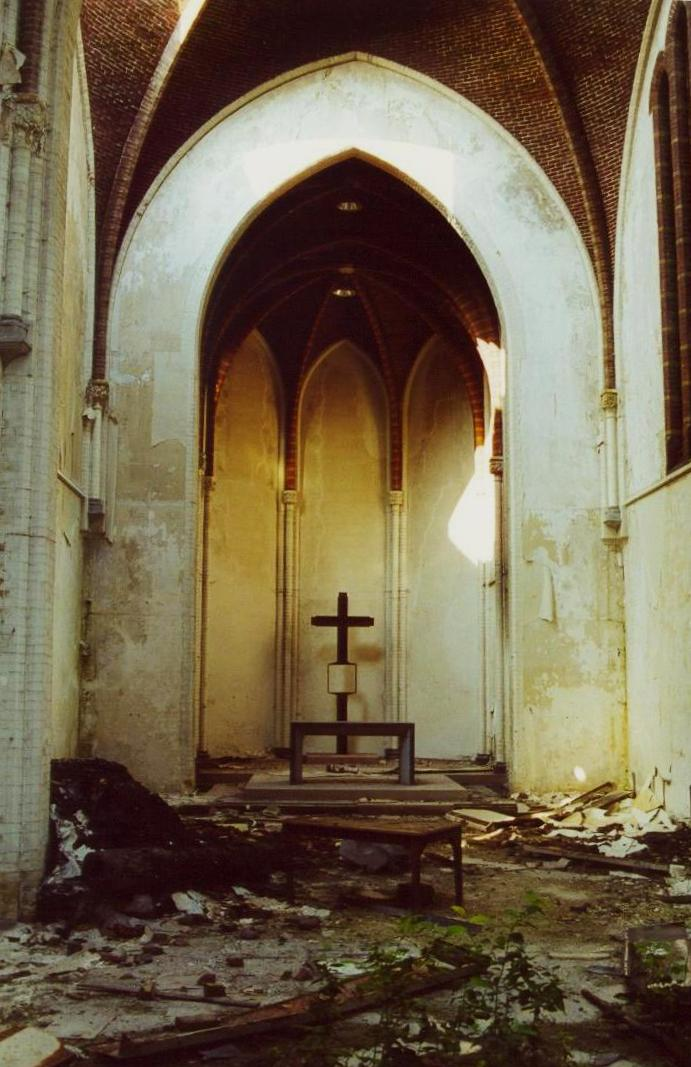
Neo-Gothic chapel in ruins

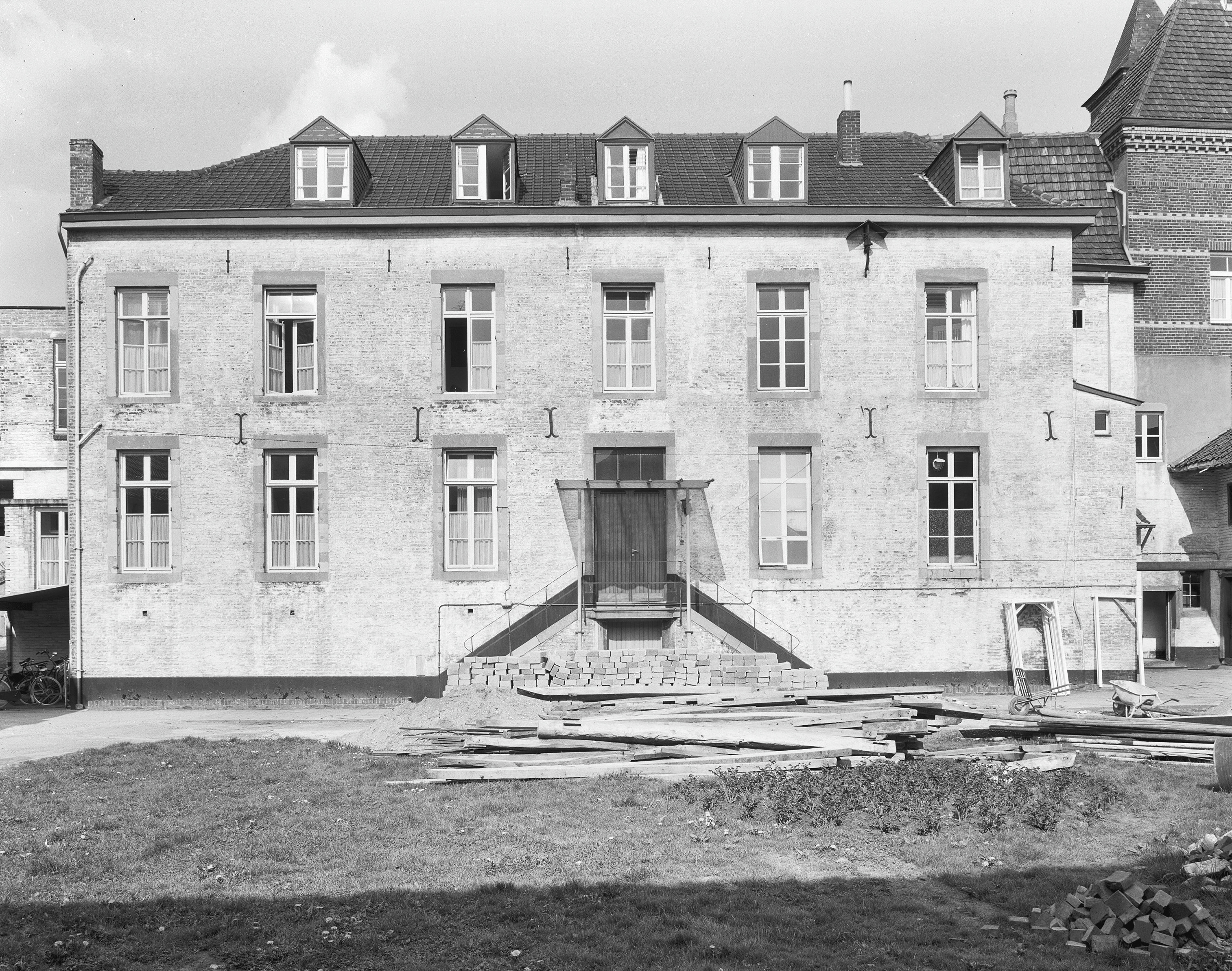
Mansion in 1966
