= Munstergeleen =

- Village
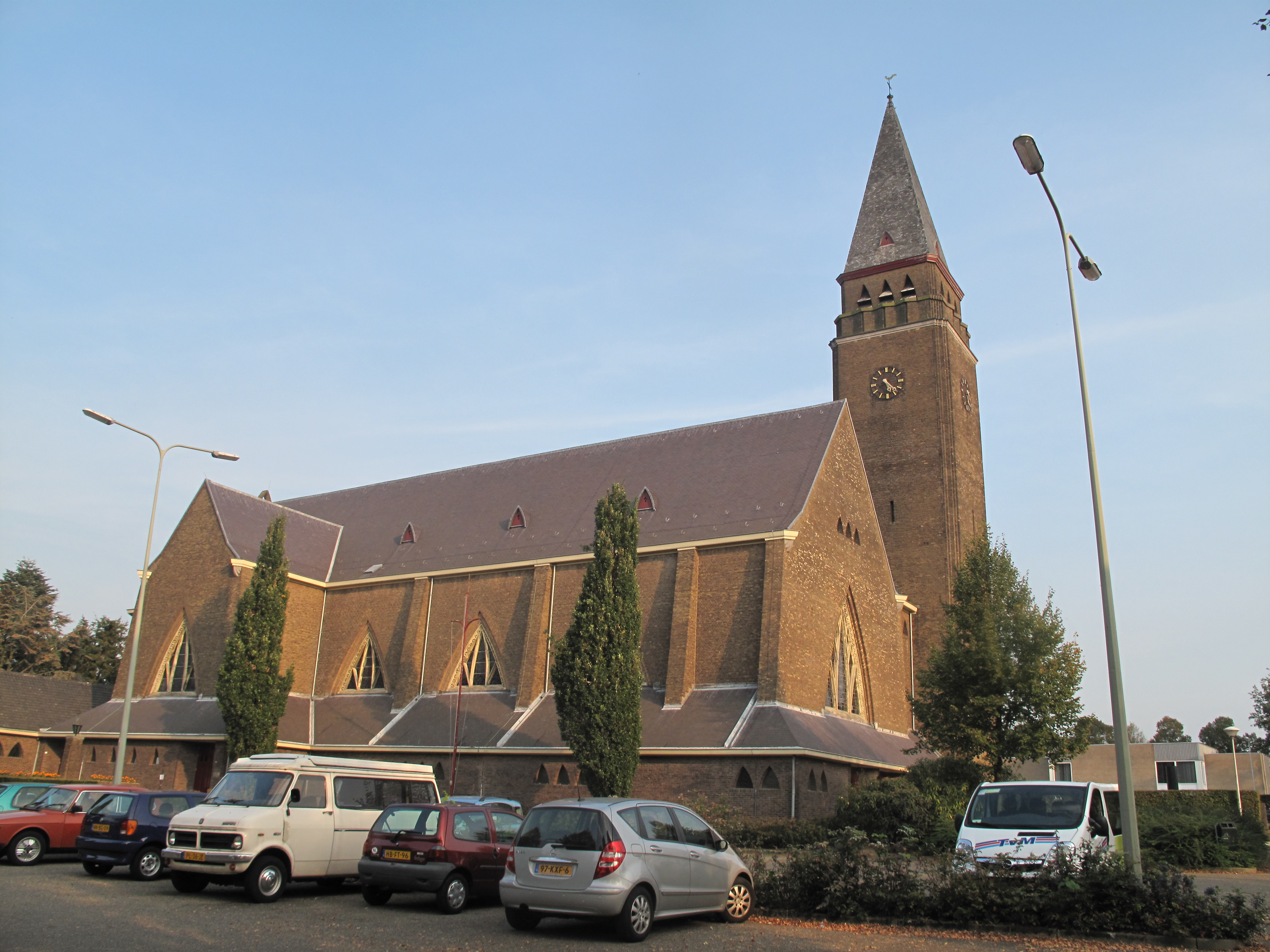
- St Pancratius Church

- Location in the Netherlands Location in the province of Limburg in the Netherlands
- Coordinates: 50°58′29″N 5°52′0″E
- Country: Netherlands
- Province: Limburg
- Municipality: Sittard-Geleen

Area
  - Total: 4.65 km^{2} (1.80 sq mi)
- Elevation: 58 m (190 ft)

Population (2021)
  - Total: 4,610
  - Density: 991/km^{2} (2,570/sq mi)
- Time zone: UTC+1 (CET)
  - Summer (DST): UTC+2 (CEST)
- Postal code: 6151
- Dialing code: 046

Munstergeleen (Dutch pronunciation: [ˈmʏnstərɣəˌleːn]; Limburgish: Munstergelaen [ˈmʏnstəʀɣəˌlɛːn]) is a village in the Dutch province of Limburg. It is located in the municipality of Sittard-Geleen, and it lies in the Western Mine Region (Westelijke Mijnstreek in Dutch).

== History ==
No one knows exactly how Munstergeleen was named. However, it is near the city of Geleen and the Dutch word munster can refer to a monastery. In the second half of the 12th century Munstergeleen was home to a Roman Catholic institution (called a proosdij in Dutch) that was commonly associated with a monastery. Evidence for Munstergeleen's early existence is provided by an explicit mention of Munstergeleen in the records of Cloister of St. Gerlach, in Houthem, Netherlands, in the year 1202. The context of the records makes it clear that Munstergeleen had already existed for some time by the beginning of the 13th century.

Munstergeleen was a separate municipality until 1982, when it was merged with Sittard.

During the time that it was a separate municipality, Munstergeleen had its own flag consisting of two equally wide stripes of blue and red and a yellow hoist-triangle along the left-hand edge. A white sword symbolizing Saint Pancratius is centered on the blue stripe, a white pair of pliers symbolizing Saint Apollonia is on the red stripe, and a black snakehead cross from the Sittard Coat of Arms is in the yellow hoist-triangle. This flag is depicted at the "Flags of the World" website.

== Churches ==
Since the majority of people in the province of Limburg are Roman Catholics, it's not surprising that both houses of worship in Munstergeleen are Roman Catholic. The primary Roman Catholic church in Munstergeleen is Pancratiuskerk (Pancratius Church) and was built in 1924–25. The church was designed by Nico Ramakers and contains leaded-glass windows by Jacques Verheyen.

Roman Catholic masses are also performed in the Pater Karelkapel (Father Karel Chapel, i.e., Saint Charles of Mount Argus). This chapel was established in 1954, in the barn associated with a half-timbered double watermill. The first of the watermills was built in 1287 on Geleenbeek (Geleen Creek) and the buildings were substantially rebuilt in 1797. Father Karel Houben's birthplace is located in this watermill complex.

Munstergeleen includes the hamlet called Abshoven, which was named for a monastery that was built starting in 1716. This monastery burned in 1995 and has recently been restored as a restaurant.

== Environment ==
The modern-day Munstergeleen is bordered by farmland on the northeast, east and south; and by the city of Sittard/Geleen in the northwest and west. This village occupies 1.8 square miles (4.64 square kilometers) of land area.

A nature preserve called Heemtuin Munstergeleen (meaning "Munstergeleen's garden of native flora" in Dutch) is a popular place to walk along well-marked paths through the forest and adjacent farmlands. The Heemtuin is home to at least 500 different kinds of plants as well as a farmer's herb garden. The Pieterpad, the most well-known walking path in The Netherlands, runs through the farmlands just outside Munstergeleen.

Munstergeleen is almost rural in character; the Dutch Central Bureau of Statistics rates Munstergeleen as a 4 on a scale of 1 to 5, where 1 is completely urban and 5 is completely rural.

== Economy ==
With exceptions such as the Jan Theelen Recording Studio, Munstergeleen does not have much industry of its own and is known as a quiet bedroom community. Residents of Munstergeleen work (for example) in chemical plants such as those operated by DSM and SABIC in Geleen, the Zuyderland Medical Center in Geleen, the NATO installation in Brunssum, the US Army installation in Schinnen, and the NedCar auto manufacturing plant in Born.

== Statistics ==
Of the 5090 inhabitants of Munstergeleen, 26% are 25 years of age or younger, 55% are between 25 and 65, and 19% are over 65.

14% of Munstergeleen's residents are considered to be immigrants, but this percentage is smaller than the immigrant population of the municipality of Sittard-Geleen, the province of Limburg, or the Netherlands as a whole. Also, Munstergeleen's immigrants are more likely to be of western than non-western origin, to a greater degree than the immigrant population of these larger groups. These differences are illustrated in the table below, from the Dutch Central Bureau of Statistics.

Immigrant Type	Munstergeleen (%)	Sittard-Geleen (%)	Limburg (%)	The Netherlands (%)
Western	12	16	14	9
Non-western	2	6	6	11

The housing stock in Munstergeleen is usually worth more, on average, than the residential real estate in the municipality and the province. The following table shows a comparison of values for 2006 and 2007, also from the Dutch Central Bureau of Statistics. Note that these are the latest dates for which the Central Bureau of Statistics splits out Munstergeleen separately, and thus these statistics should be considered illustrative only.

	2006 (Median price, 1000s Euros)	2007 (Median price, 1000s Euros)
Munstergeleen	207	213
Sittard-Geleen	165	178
Limburg	180	195
The Netherlands	201	217

== Community activities ==
A civic center called "Gemeenschaphuis 'Trefpunt Munstergeleen," which translates to "Munstergeleen Municipal Hall Meeting Point," was built in 1981. The large rooms in this facility are used frequently by community groups or are rented by individual Munstergeleen residents for activities, meetings and parties. Examples of community groups are listed below.

=== The arts ===
- Fanfare Juliana Munstergeleen (Marching band Juliana Munstergeleen) is an organization that includes a marching band, drum corps, and youth marching band; and that encourages music education at the local primary school. It was formed in 1908.
- Munsterglaner, a Brass-band/Amusement-band mix that performs at local festivities and among typical Czech bands at festivities outside Munstergeleen, was formed in 1951.
- Schildersclub Munstergeleen (Munstergeleen Painting Club) has been in existence since 1992.
- Toneelgroep Pancratius (Pancratius Theater Group) was formed in 1928.
- Zaate Hermenie Bôntj & Blauw (Drunken Marching Band "Black & Blue", Dutch idiom, literally: "colorful and blue") was formed in 1990 for the purpose of playing traditional Limburgish music.

=== Scouting ===
- Scoutinggroep Munstergeleen (Munstergeleen Scout Group) has seven programs for boys and girls from ages 5 and up.

=== Special Interest Groups ===
- De Edelzanger Munstergeleen (The Noble singer Munstergeleen), a birdwatching group, began in 1959.
- Institute Voor Natuurbeschermingseducatie (IVN) Munstergeleen (Institution For Education on environmental protection Munstergeleen) is Munstergeleen's chapter of the IVN.
- Oldtimerclub Munstergeleen was formed in 1998 for collecting and riding antique motorized bicycles.
- Zij Actief Limburg (She Active Limburg) is a province-wide women's service club with a chapter in Munstergeleen.

=== Sports ===
- Badminton Vereniging Munstergeleen (Munstergeleen Badminton Association)
- Boksclub de Amateur (Boxing Club "The Amateur")
- Dartvereniging Bullseye (Bullseye Darts Association)
- Handbalvereniging Sport Vereniging Munstergeleen (Munstergeleen Handball Association)
- Sportsociëteit Reuvers (Reuvers Sports Society; for fitness, swimming, and saunas)
- Tennisclub Munstergeleen (Munstergeleen Tennis Club)
- Voetbalvereniging Sport Vereniging Munstergeleen (Munstergeleen Soccer Association)

=== Carnival ===
- Vastelaoves Vereniging de Haverbüle (Carnival Association "the Oatsacks"), an association organizing festivities around the Carnival season (Limburgish: Vastelaovestied).

== Born in Munstergeleen ==
Munstergeleen was the birthplace of Olympic pole vaulter Rens Blom (1977-), as well as Saint Charles of Mount Argus (1821–1893).

== Famous inhabitants ==
American singer George McCrae lives one part of the year with his wife in Munstergeleen.

== Photos ==
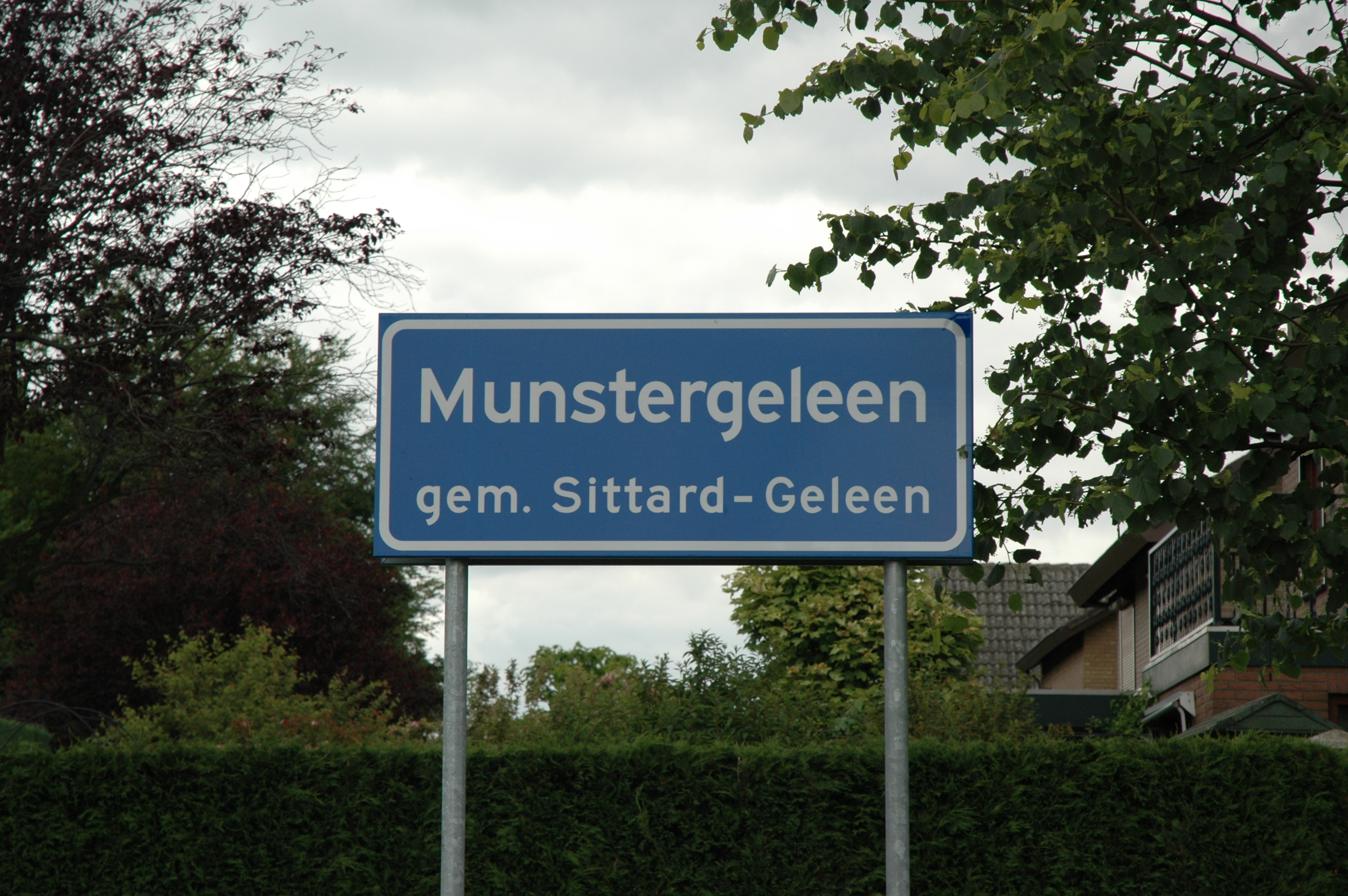
Entering Munstergeleen

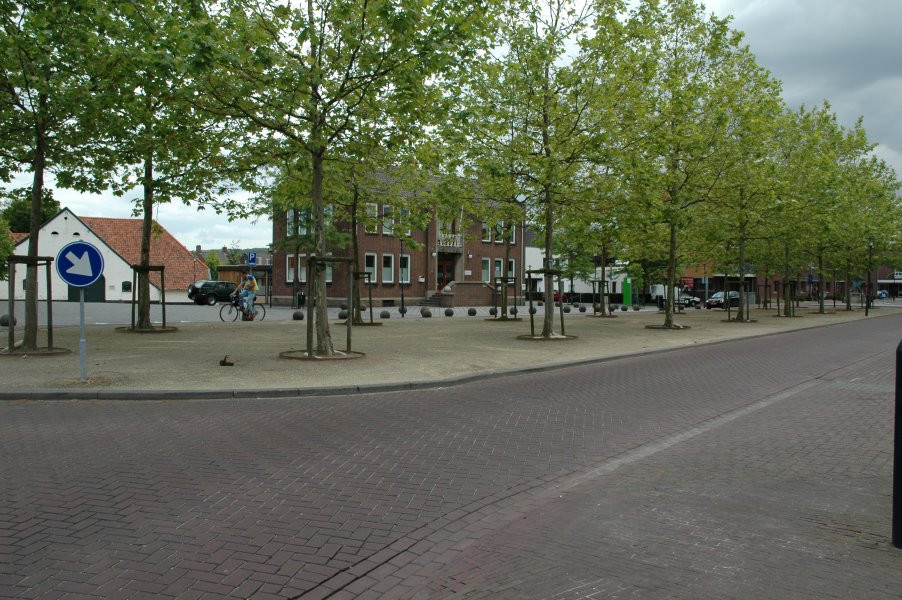
Former City Hall

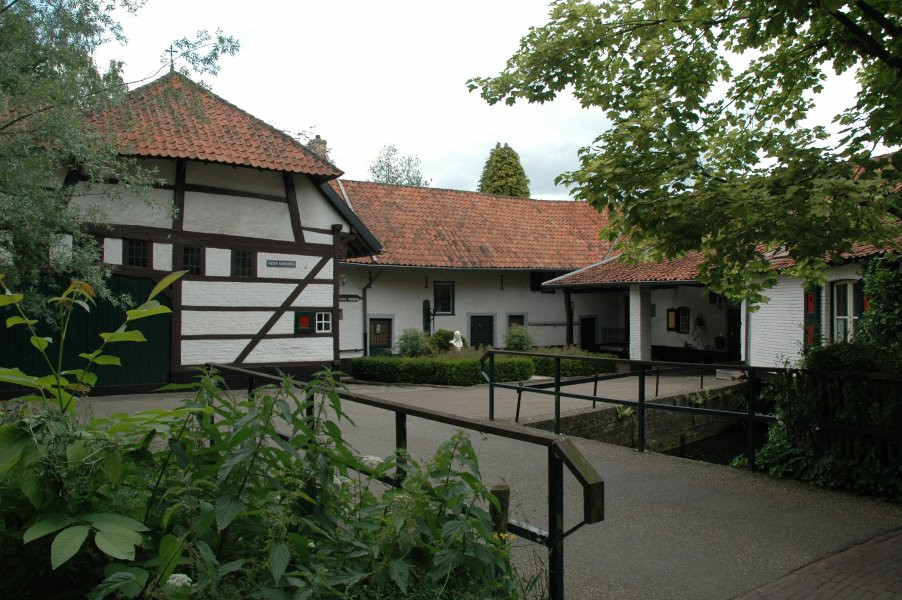
Father Karel Chapel and Birthplace

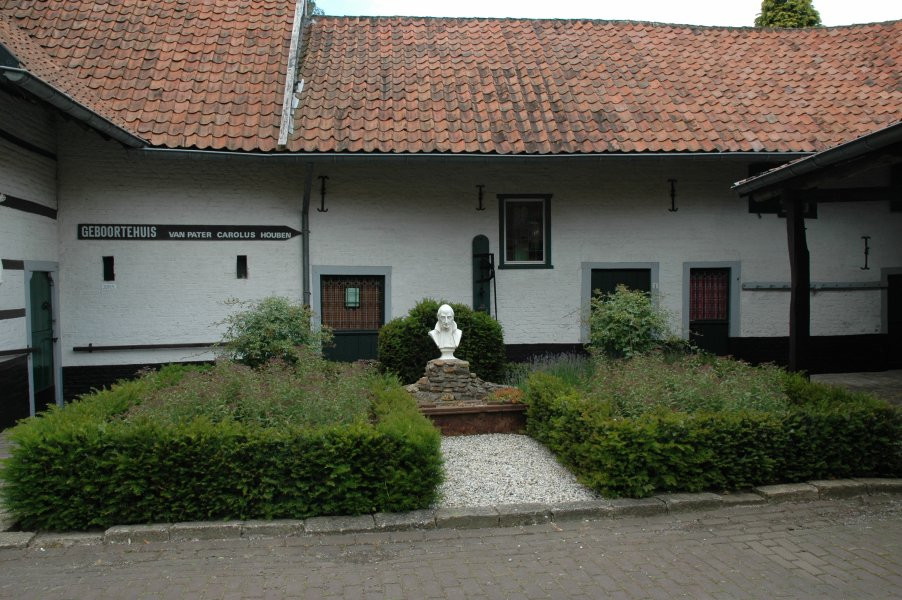
Father Karel Sculpture

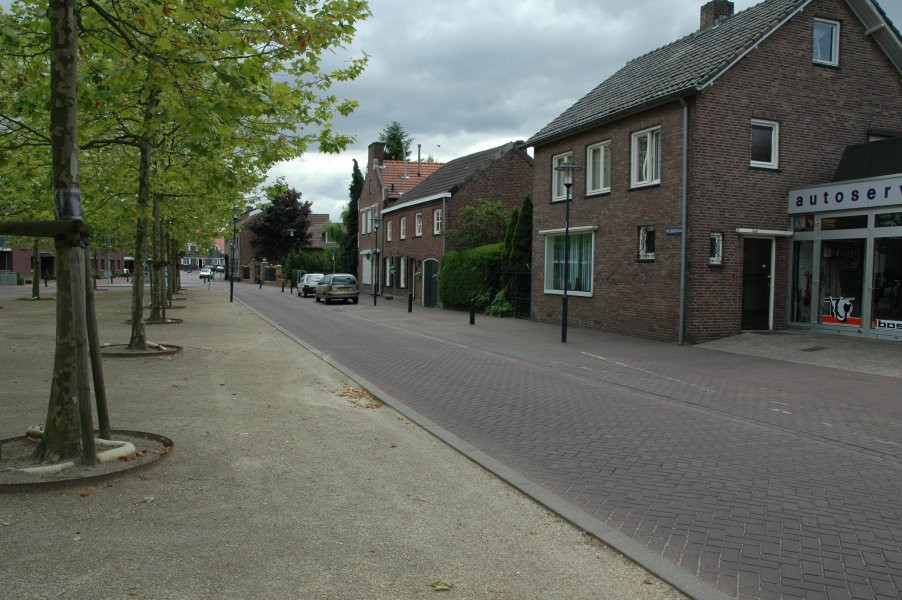
Peter Street

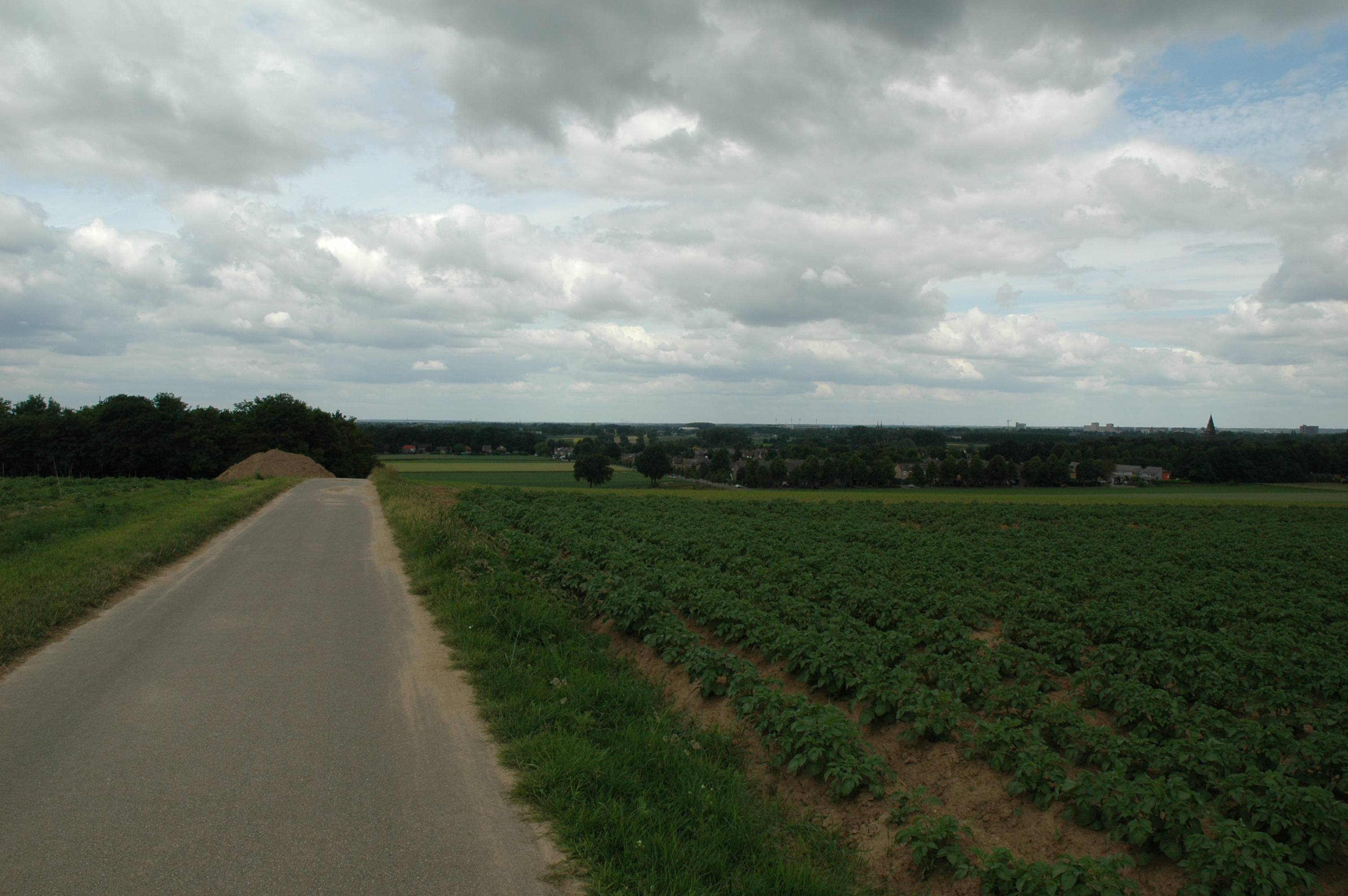
Farmlands outside Munstergeleen
