= Limbricht =

- Village
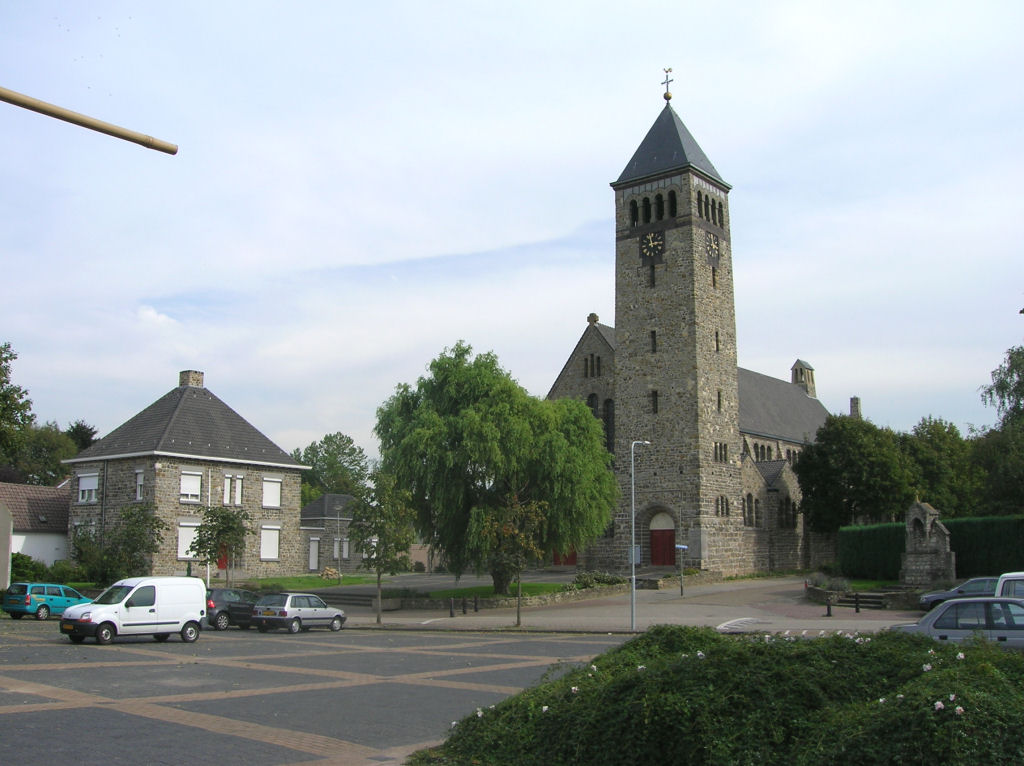
- Nieuwe Sint-Salviuskerk

- Location in the Netherlands Location in the province of Limburg in the Netherlands
- Coordinates: 51.0117°N 5.8369°E
- Country: Netherlands
- Province: Limburg
- Municipality: Sittard-Geleen

Area
  - Total: 2.91 km^{2} (1.12 sq mi)
- Elevation: 46 m (151 ft)

Population (2026)
  - Total: 2,563
  - Density: 881/km^{2} (2,280/sq mi)
- Time zone: UTC+1 (CET)
  - Summer (DST): UTC+2 (CEST)
- Postal code: 6140-6141
- Dialing code: 046
- Major roads: N276

Limbricht (Dutch pronunciation: [ˈlɪmbrɪxt]; Limburgish: Lömmerig [ˈlœməʀɪx] locally spelled Lömmerich) is a village in the Dutch province of Limburg. Part of the municipality of Sittard-Geleen, it is about three kilometres northwest of Sittard.

The village was first mentioned in 1224 as de Lumburg. The etymology is unclear. Limbricht developed in the Middle Ages to the south of the motte-and-bailey castle Lemborgh. In the 20th century, it developed as a mining town.

Limbricht Castle possibly dates from the 10th century. The current castle dates from around 1630 and is built in a mannerist style. The eastern wing was destroyed during World War II, but rebuilt between 1968 and 1978.

Limbricht was home to 554 people in 1840. was a separate municipality until 1982, when it was merged with Sittard.

== Gallery ==
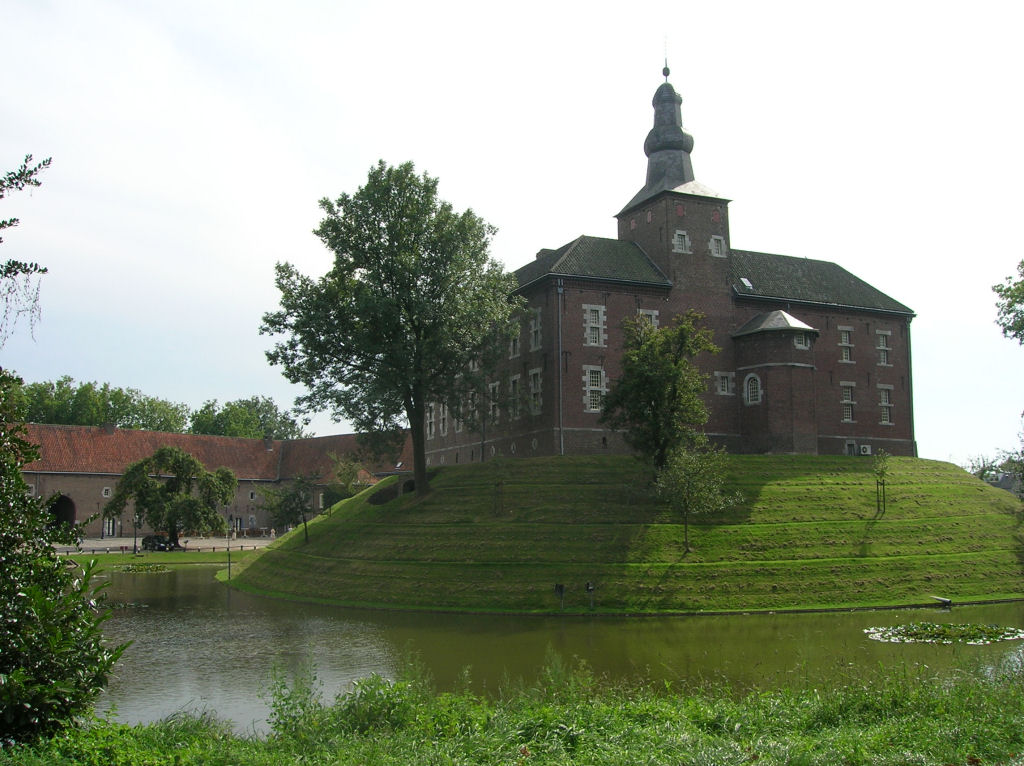
Limbricht castle
