= Broeksittard =

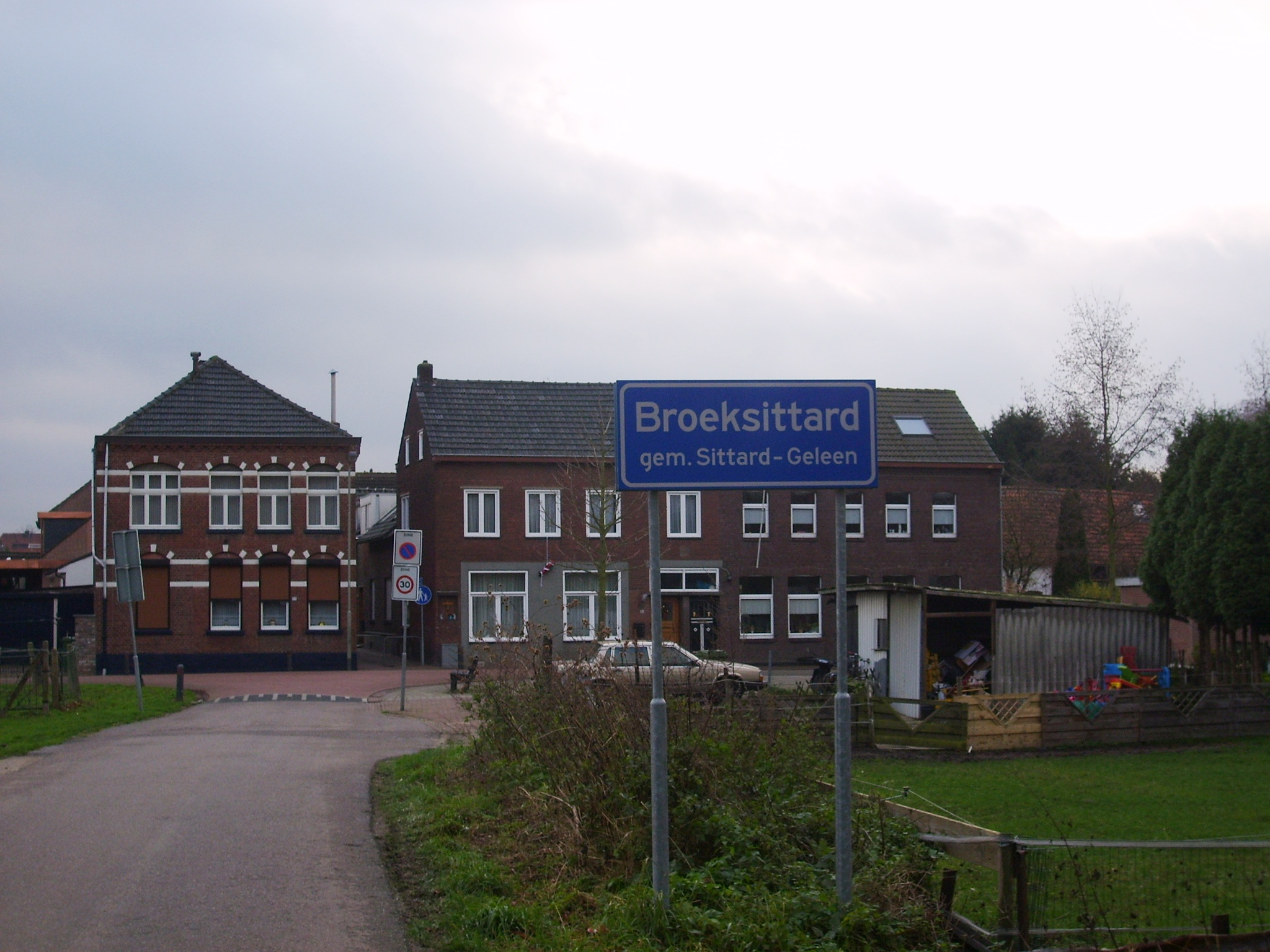

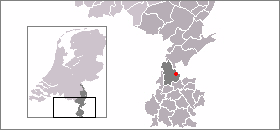
- Coordinates: 51°00′10″N 5°53′40″E
- Country: Netherlands
- Province: Limburg
- Municipality: Sittard-Geleen

Population (1 January 2005)
  - Total: 1,690
- Postal code: 6137 (Sittard)
- Dialling code: 046

Broeksittard (Dutch pronunciation: [ˈbrukˌsɪtɑrt]; Limburgish: Broukzittert [ˈbʀɔwkˌsɪtəʀt]) is a former village in the Dutch province of Limburg. It is now a neighbourhood of the town Sittard, and part of the municipality of Sittard-Geleen. It has partly kept its village character.

Broeksittard was a separate municipality between 1817 and 1942, when it was merged with Sittard by the German occupier.

From 24 March to 28 March 1543 Broeksittard was almost completely destroyed during the battle for the Kemperkoul. This battle was fought between Duke Wilhelm of Jülich-Cleves-Berg and Emperor Charles V. The battle was won by Wilhelm and left over 4000 soldiers and 900 horses dead. Infuriated by his loss Charles gave permission to all his remaining soldiers to plunder the area resulting in mass rapes, murder, theft and devastation in the rest of the Gulik country.
