= Charles of Mount Argus =

Dutch Passionist priest

Saint Charles Houben of St Andrew CP
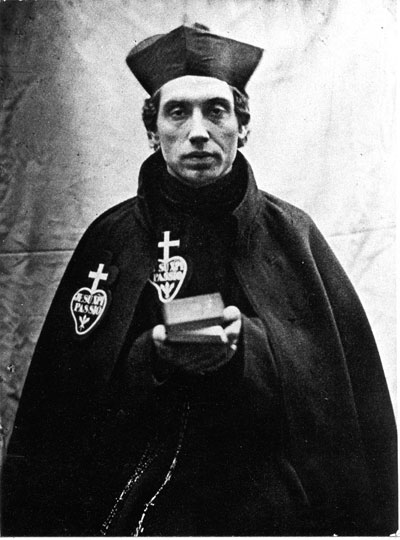
- Father Charles of St Andrew wearing the Passionist habit (1851)
- Born: 11 December 1821; Munstergeleen, Limburg, United Kingdom of the Netherlands
- Died: 5 January 1893 (aged 71); St Paul's Retreat, Mount Argus, Harold's Cross, Dublin
- Venerated in: Roman Catholic Church
- Beatified: 16 October 1988, Saint Peter's Basilica by Pope John Paul II
- Canonized: 3 June 2007, Saint Peter's Basilica by Pope Benedict XVI
- Major shrine: St Paul's Retreat, Mount Argus, Harold's Cross, Dublin 6W, Ireland
- Feast: 5 January
- Attributes: Passionist habit, crucifix, breviary, biretta

Charles of Mount Argus (11 December 1821 – 5 January 1893) was a Dutch Passionist priest who served in 19th-century Ireland. He gained a reputation for his compassion for the sick and those in need of guidance. His reputation for healings and miracles was so great at the time that a reference is made to him in the famous novel Ulysses by James Joyce. He has been canonized by the Catholic Church. His feast day is 5 January.

== Life ==
Born Joannes Andreas Houben on 11 December 1821 in the village of Munstergeleen in the Province of Limburg in the Kingdom of the Netherlands, to Peter Joseph Houben and his wife, Johanna Elizabeth Luyten. He was named after his maternal uncle and godfather, but to the family, he was known as Andrew. His father was a miller by trade. As a boy, Andrew attended the village primary school. One of 11 children in a poor family, he was a slow learner in his youth. To those outside his family he seemed quiet and extremely shy. A slow learner, for ten years he walked the two miles to a secondary school at nearby town of Sittard.

When Houben was 19 years old he was enrolled for military service in the First Infantry Regiment of the Netherlands. During his time as a soldier, there was a disturbance in the town; the army were called out and ordered to fire. Afraid that he might hit someone, Andrew pointed his rifle the wrong way and narrowly missed shooting his superior officer. On 18 February 1845 his period as a reserve in the army came to an end and he was formally discharged.

== Passionist ==
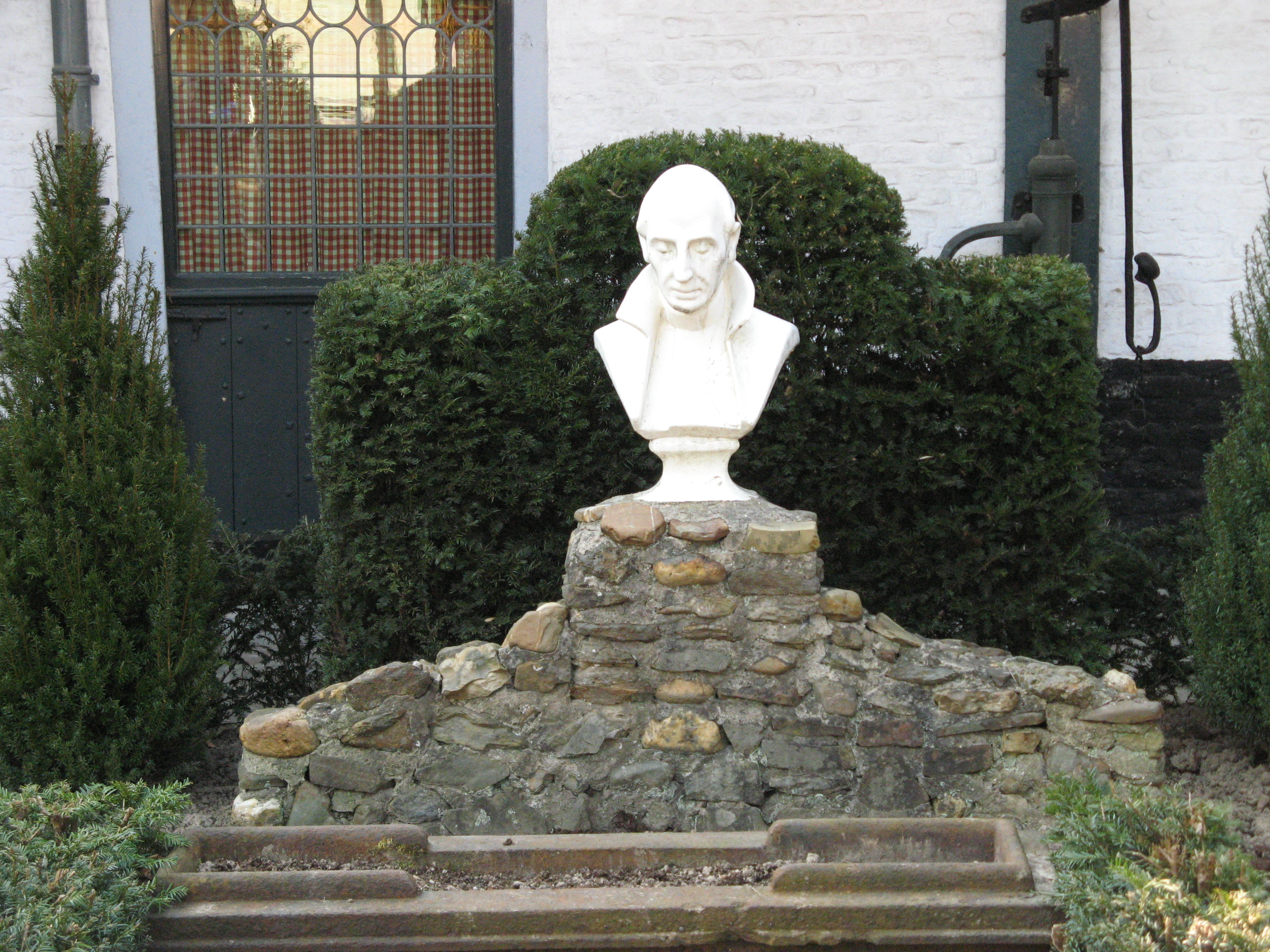
Bust of St. Charles in Munstergeleen

Feeling called to religious life, in 1845 Houben was admitted to the novitiate of the Passionists, who had recently arrived in Belgium, in the village of Ere, near Tournai. He professed his religious vows the following year and was given the religious habit and the religious name Charles of St. Andrew. It was during this time that Charles met Dominic Barberi and was among the group of students who were chosen to accompany him to the boat shortly before his death at Reading in August 1849. His father died in 1850, just before Charles' ordination as a priest. The family were so poor they could not afford to go to his ordination because of the expenses of the funeral. Even happy days were lonely days. He was sent to serve in England in 1852. He was appointed assistant novice master in the Passionist retreat of St. Wilfred at Cotton Hall and ministered to neighbouring areas, including Cheadle, Staffordshire. Serving there, Charles first came in contact with the Irish who were moving to England in the wake of the devastating famine taking place there.

Following the death of Paul Mary Packenham, the first rector of Mount Argus, at the request of Ignatius Spencer, Charles was transferred to Ireland in July 1857 to the newly founded retreat of Blessed Paul at Mount Argus, in Harold's Cross, Dublin. Traditionally Passionists are supposed to conduct missions and retreats and, through preaching, spread devotion to the Passion of Christ. Charles was not a good preacher. He never really mastered the English language, but it was in the confessional and in comforting the sick that he excelled, and he became fond of the Irish people.

== Healer ==
It was Charles' gift of healing the sick which is most clearly remembered. Another member of the Passionist community in Dublin, Sebastian Keens, CP, told of a 12-year-old boy who had lost the use of his leg and was brought to him. Without delay, he called Charles and shortly afterwards found the boy walking up and down in front of the house completely cured. He became so popular with the people that the diocesan authorities, as well as the medical profession, grew suspicious of him. Some medical doctors complained to Cardinal Cullen, the Archbishop of Dublin, that he discouraged people from going to the doctor, a claim later retracted. Unscrupulous persons took holy water blessed by Charles and unbeknownst to him began to sell it throughout Ireland. In order to discourage this practice, Charles was transferred back to England in 1866 to serve at the Retreat of St Anne at Sutton in St Helens, Merseyside and remained there for eight years while also serving at St Saviour's Retreat, Broadway.

Charles returned to Dublin in 1874. A trap in which he was travelling overturned near St Clare's Convent at Harold's Cross, causing a fracture which never set right. He remained in Dublin until his death which took place at dawn on 5 January 1893.

== Veneration ==
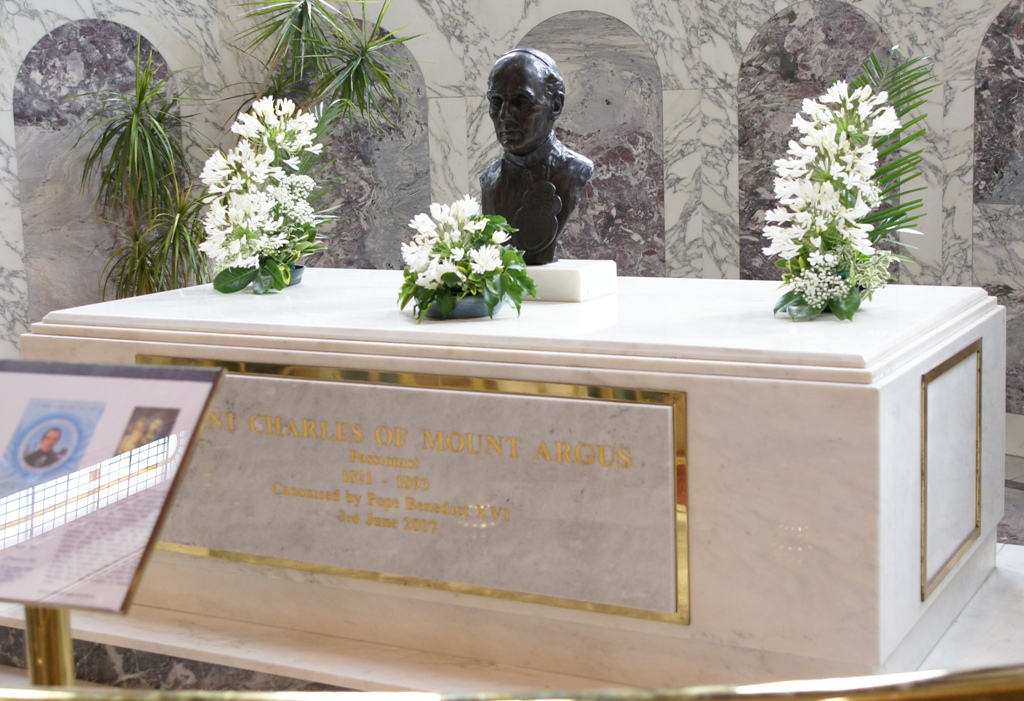
The tomb of Father Charles in Mount Argus Church, Dublin

At his funeral, attended by people from all over Ireland, there was definite proof of the popular devotion that had surrounded him throughout his life. The Superior of the monastery wrote to his family: "The people have already declared him a saint."

Charles' writings were approved by theologians on 9 May 1934, and the cause for his beatification was formally opened on 13 November 1935, granting him the title of Servant of God. After the declaration of a miracle attributed to his intercession, on 16 October 1988, Pope John Paul II beatified Charles. The miracle that led to his canonization was the healing of Adolf Dormans of Munstergeleen, Charles' birthplace, who was cured of "perforated, gangrenous appendicitis with generalized peritonitis that was multi-organically compromising" and which cure was "not scientifically explainable". The theologian consultors and the Ordinary Congregation of Cardinals and Bishops gave their unanimous approval of the claimed supernatural aspect of the said alleged healing. Charles was canonized on 3 June 2007 by Pope Benedict XVI.

From December 2021 to January 2023, a special holy year has been given recognition by Pope Francis to commemorate the bicentenary of the birth of Charles. The Apostolic Penitentiary has granted the possibility of gaining a plenary indulgence to those faithful who visit the tomb and shrine of St Charles at Mount Argus or the place of his birth at Munstergeleen in the Netherlands.

== See also ==
- List of Catholic saints
