= Paul Derrez =

Paul Derrez (born 20 February 1950) is an Amsterdam-based visual artist. He has established himself as a jewelry designer, gallery owner and collector. He has worked as a teacher in the arts education sector and as an author. Derrez was a founder and for six years a board member of the Dutch Association of jewelry designers and makers ("Vereniging van Edelsmeden en Sieraadontwerpers").

== Life ==
Paul Derrez was born in Sittard, a small former mining town a short distance to the north of Maastricht in Limburg. His parents ran a jewelry shop in Sittard.

He attended the Academy for Industrial Design in Eindhoven between 1968 and 1970, and the School of Arts (as it is now known) in Utrecht from 1970 till 1972. He then studied for his degree between 1972 and 1975 at the Vocational Academy ("Vakschool") at nearby Schoonhoven. The expectation had been that he would take over his family's business in Sittard. However, after an internship at the "Galerie Sieraad" (jewelry gallery) in Amsterdam he decided to settle permanently in that city. A crucial factor in this decision was his friendship with Willem Hoogstede.

Q: How conscious were you of your role as missionary and history-maker when you started in Amsterdam?

"When I became part of the Dutch jewelry scene, in about 1975, there was a feeling of starting a new era for jewelry. We thought a total break with history and conventions was necessary. To gain new possibilities, we needed to experiment in many directions: in concepts, in designs, in materials, in relation to the body, in genders. We called the results experimental jewelry.... But revolutions run the risk of developing new conventions and restrictions. To avoid this trap, new orientation and research in many directions was necessary.... I don't use the word “experiment” anymore as it points too much to “finding” something new. I now prefer the word “research” for developing new ideas.”

Paul Derrez, interviewed by Benjamin Lignel in 2016

In 1975 he launched himself as a freelance gold/silversmith working in the basement in the house where he was living in the city centre. He produced several much admired silver pieces ("wisselring" & "wisselarmband"). In 1975 the Sieraad Gallery where he had been working closed down. It had been the first gallery in Amsterdam specialising in jewelry. A year later, in 1976, Derrez set up the Ra Gallery which in some ways took on the mantle of the Sieraad. The new gallery was named after the ancient Egyptian sun god. It provided a showcase for Dutch silversmiths and jewelry designers and, from 1978, also welcomed the work of international artists. In 1980 Derrez became the first winner of the (subsequently biennial) Françoise van den Bosch Prize for stimulating international interest in jewelry. The cash element of the prize was worth 4,000 Guilders.

Q: If you had to write a letter of advice to your younger self, what would your recommendations be??

"How to survive is partly a matter of choice: ... Living cheap. Building an enthusiastic team around you .... to make running the gallery smooth, efficient, and therefore cheaper. For a while I was teaching, and this brought in some money. But it also distracted from gallery duties. Partly it's a matter of luck. My husband Willem had a steady job and housed and fed me when I was broke. .... But the gallery is always dependent on sales. A few years ago there was the crisis, and people stopped spending money. I had to let go of my employees, but the gallery survived. Now the economy and mood are positive again, and Ra is alive and kicking.”

Paul Derrez, interviewed by Benjamin Lignel in 2016

The 1980s were a decade of rapid internationalisation in the jewelry business. In 1984 Derrez was a co-organiser of the Australian "Cross Currents" exhibition, featuring pieces from Australia, Britain, Germany and the Netherlands. Several more exhibitions followed to which Derrez contributed as conservator or organiser.

He started working with cork in 1985, producing necklaces as well as bowls and other utensils. In 1986 an exhibition was opened at Sittard using the jewelry collection of Paul Derrez and his friend Willem Hoogstede. It remained on display for ten years. Around 2000 he spent three months as artist in residence at the "Objects-studio" in Sydney, Australia. In 2005 he produced his "Condoommonstrans", wishing to present the piece at an exhibition in Legnica (Poland). However, the centrality of a condom in the design and the surrounding "halo of hearts and spermatozoids" made the design controversial, and he withdrew his design from the exhibition in order to "avoid a riot". The "Condoommonstrans" is now preserved in the "church-critical collection" at the Museum Catharijneconvent in Utrecht.

On 1 November 2015 an exhibition opened featuring approximately 100 Derrez pieces at the CODA (culture centre) in Apeldoorn in celebration of the artist's forty years as a designer and pioneer in the world of jewelry.

Derrez was a board member of the Dutch Association of jewelry designers and makers ("Vereniging van Edelsmeden en Sieraadontwerpers") between 1976 and 1981, serving during the latter part of the part of that period as chairman. Between 1991 and 2000 he chaired the Françoise van den Bosch Foundation

For some years, starting in 1995, he taught at the Arts Academy in Maastricht. In addition, from 2008 till 2010 he lectured at the Gerrit Rietveld Academie in Amsterdam-Zuid.

== Work ==
The early work of Derrez has a gender-neutral character. It is marked by clear shapes and the use of silver and acrylate. Midway through the 1990s his output acquired a homo-erotic character. The jewelry series "Risky business" includes references to leather straps. Derrez insists that jewelry should not always be harmonious: often it is more exciting when pieces also highlight discrepancies and rougher elements. When, in 1993, he was invited to make male jewelry for fashion shows, as a self-aware homosexual himself, he took inspiration from subcultures, fetishism and "adult toys". He himself likes to wear jewelry from his "Tools and Toys" series. For this series he used materials from the estate of Françoise van den Bosch and it is therefore sometimes referred to as his "aristocratic aluminium" ("adellijk aluminium") collection.

During the present century the focus of his work has increasingly been on silverware: spoons, bowls, jugs and containers, occasionally with a humorous or provocative character, as in the case of his "Conversation bowl".

In 2012 Derrez started applying so-called "confetti" on some of his jewelry and tableware. This involved applying dots of transparent acrylate, often tinted in bright or fluorescent colours. Later he applied a similar decorative effect "monumentally", at the CODA (culture centre) in Apeldoorn and at his own gallery.

== Personal ==
Paul Derrez married his longstanding partner, Willem Hoogstede, in 2006.
